= List of previous Days of Our Lives cast members =

This is a list of previous cast members from Days of Our Lives, an American soap opera on the NBC network.

== Previous cast members ==
Previous Days of Our Lives cast members
Actor	Character	Duration
Ian Abercrombie	Lawyer	1997
Ian Abercrombie	Mr Simkins	1998
Ian Abercrombie	Jeweller	2002
Ian Abercrombie	Hotel manager	2002
James Acheson	Jack Deveraux	1987
Jensen Ackles	Eric Brady	1997–2000
Marla Adams	Claire McIntyre	1999
Joseph Adams	Jack Deveraux	1987
Deborah Adair	Kate Roberts	1993–1995
Lucas Adams	Tripp Johnson	2017–2024
Antony Alda	Johnny Corelli	1990–1991
Robert Alda	Stuart Whyland	1981–82
Rhonda Aldrich	Kayla Brady	1989
Sarah Aldrich	Jill Stevens	1996–97
Denise Alexander	Susan Martin	1966–73
Victor Alfieri	Franco Kelly	1996–98
Jed Allan	Don Craig	1971–85
Alisa Allapach	Annabelle	2016
Jeremy Allen	Jeremy Horton	1989
Krista Allen	Billie Reed	1996–99
Brandon Amber	Andrew Donovan	1988–89
Hiro Ambrosino	Tori Narita	2015
John Amour	Mike Horton	1971–73
Deke Anderson	Eddie Reed	1989
Dion Anderson	Dr. Miller	2000-2003
Pamela Anderson	Cindy	1992
Brian Andrews	Mike Horton	1970
Réal Andrews	Hal Michaels	2016–17
Tina Andrews	Valerie Grant	1975–77
John Aniston	Eric Richards	1969–70
John Aniston	Victor Kiriakis	1985–2022
Frank Annese	Barry Reid	1984–85
John Aprea	Dr. Bryce	1999
John Aprea	Arthur	2012
Ronit Aranoff	Sami Brady	1984
Melissa Archer	Serena Mason	2014–15, 2017
Adrian Arnold	Max Brady	1987
Lindsay Arnold	Allie Horton	2020–23
Rod Arrants	Richard Cates	1985
Berlyn and Brooklyn Baca	Sydney DiMera	2014
Camila Banus	Gabi Hernandez	2010–23
Brandon Barash	Stefan DiMera	2019–20, 2022–24
Brandon Barash	Jake Lambert	2020–23
Brandon Barash	Johnny DiMera	2022
Andrea Barber	Carrie Brady	1982–86
Ron Barker	Chief Tarrington	1987–92
Julian Barnes	Dr Goddard	1992
Julian Barnes	Harold	2009–18
Eileen Barnett	Brooke Hamilton	1978–80
Samantha Barrows	Noelle Curtis	1984–89
Patricia Barry	Addie Horton	1971–74
Chad Barstad	David Banning	1967–1970
William H. Bassett	Scott Blake	1968
William H. Bassett	Jerry Barnes	1969
William H. Bassett	Dr. Walter Griffin	1977-78
William H. Bassett	Det. Weston	1983
William H. Bassett	Jack Lane	1985
William H. Bassett	Government Official	1988
Jeanne Bates	Anne Peters	1972–75
Matt Battaglia	J.L. King	1997
Jaime Lyn Bauer	Laura Horton	1993–99, 2003, 2010, 2013, 2016, 2018, 2021
Trey Baxter	EJ DiMera	2018
Michael Bays	Julio Ramirez	1988–89
Brigid Bazlen	Mary Anderson	1972
Terrence Beasor	Ernesto Toscano	1989
Rory Beauregard	Eric Brady	1984−85
Jim Beaver	Father Tim Jansen	1996–2002
Barbara Beckley	Caroline Brady	1984–85
Fred Beir	Larry Atwood	1977–78
Nick Benedict	Curtis Reed	1993–95, 1997, 1999–2001
Brenda Benet	Lee DuMonde	1979–82
Fran Bennett	Judge Ross	2002
Ashley Benson	Abigail Deveraux	2004–07
Robert Benvenisti	Kevin Lambert	2001–02, 2007
Blake Berris	Nick Fallon	2006–09, 2012–14, 2021, 2023
Blake Berris	Everett Lynch	2023–24
Richard Biggs	Marcus Hunter	1987–94
Brandon and Eric Billings	Brady Black	1994–99
Dick Billingsley	Scotty Banning	1981–83
Len Birman	Judge Milton Bartlett	1992
Matthew Bischof	DJ Craig	1980
Joy Bisco	Gabby	2007
Nadia Bjorlin	Chloe Lane	1999–2005, 2007–11, 2013, 2015–23
Steve Blackwood	Bart Biederbecke	1997–2005, 2007
Daphne Bloomer	Eugenia Willens	2002–06
Kwesi Boakye	Artemis	2007
Riley Bodenstab	Cole Hines	2013–2015
Alisha Boe	Daphne	2014–15
Andrea Bogart	Margo Harrison	2002
Alexander Elijah Bond	Thomas DiMera	2026
Jay Bontatibus	Rob McCullough	2008
Carla Borelli	Mary Anderson	1975
Roscoe Born	Trent Robbins	2008
Joseph Bottoms	Cal Winters	1991
Matthew Bowman	Melissa Horton	1971
Tanya Boyd	Celeste Perrault	1994–2007
Stewart Bradley	Lieutenant Danton	1967–71, 1973, 1977–79, 1981
Vanessa Branch	Giselle Van Hopper	2014
Kyle Brandt	Philip Kiriakis	2003–06
Tamara Braun	Ava Vitali	2008, 2015–2016, 2020–2025
Tamara Braun	Taylor Walker	2011
Tracey E. Bregman	Donna Temple Craig	1978–80
Ryan Brennan	Max Brady	1987–88, 1990–92
Betty Bridges	Susan	1986
Fabrizio Brienza	Santo DiMera	2012
Lisa Brinegar	Sarah Horton	1985–89
Don Briscoe	Tony Merritt	1966
Stanley Brock	Howie Hoffstedder	1983–86
Elaine Bromka	Stella Lombard	1992
Aimee Brooks	Sarah Horton	1990–91
Darin Brooks	Max Brady	2005–10
J. Cynthia Brooks	Taylor McCall	1992–93
Jason Brooks	Peter Blake	1993–98
Jason Brooks	Daniel Scott	1996
Stephen Brooks	Joshua Fallon	1980–81
Shellye Broughton	Lexie Carver	1993
Sydney Brower	Arianna Horton	2019–20
Alli Brown	Sarah Horton	1991
Lew Brown	Shawn Brady	1984–85
Peter Brown	Greg Peters	1972–79
Roger Aaron Brown	Danny Grant	1981–86
Sarah Joy Brown	Madison James	2011–12
Robert Brubaker	John Martin	1966–71
Alexander Bruszt	Fynn Thompson	2015–16
Ian Buchanan	Lord Sheraton	2001
Ian Buchanan	Ian McAllister	2012
Tara Buckman	Norma Kirkland	1984–85
Brooke Bundy	Rebecca North	1975–77
Lauren Bundy	Sami Brady	1984−85
Richard Burgi	Phillip Collier	1992–93
Annie Burgstede	Willow Stark	2006–07
Molly Burnett	Melanie Jonas	2008–12, 2014–16
Bonnie Burroughs	Gretchen Lindquist	1991
Steve Burton	Harris Michaels	1988, 2023–24
Brandon Butler	Zack Brady	2025
Chelsea Butler	Belle Black	1998–1999
Sarah G. Buxton	Crystal Galore	2004
Ruth Buzzi	Leticia Bradford	1983
Lorenzo Caccialanza	Nico	1988–91, 1999–2000, 2002–03, 2005–06
Kurt Caceres	Guillermo	2016
Adam Caine	Edmund Crumb	1998, 2023
Al Calderon	Javi Hernandez	2024–2026
John Callahan	Tyler Malone	1983
John Callahan	Artie Doyle	1989
John Callahan	Richard Baker	2008–10
Stephanie Cameron	Jennifer Horton	1995–98
Joseph Campanella	Harper Deveraux	1987–88, 1990–92
Robert Eliot Canko	Andrew Donovan	1986–88
Sandra Canning	Grace Jeffries	1990
Michael Cardelle	Kyle Southern	2015
Macdonald Carey	Tom Horton	1965–94
Ismael 'East' Carlo	Alessandro Chavez	2007
Shawn and Taylor Carpenter	Will Horton	1995–2002
Paul Carr	Bill Horton	1965–66
Jody Carter	Caroline Brady	1983–84
Noel Bennett Castle	Shawn-Douglas Brady	1987
Matt Cedeño	Brandon Walker	1999–2005
Beth Chamberlin	Nancy Trent	1993
Patrice Chanel	Gail Carson	1989
Judith Chapman	Anjelica Deveraux	1989–91, 2018
Judith Chapman	Diana Colville	2019
Crystal Chappell	Carly Manning	1990–93, 2009–11
Ariana Chase	Kimberly Brady	1992–93
Maree Cheatham	Marie Horton	1965–68, 1970–71, 1973, 1994, 1996, 2010, 2024–2025
Laura Kai Chen	Melinda Trask	2013, 2016–2019
Shawn Christian	Daniel Jonas	2008–17, 2020
Cary Christopher	Thomas DiMera	2020–2026
Eric Christmas	Father Francis Baker	1995–96
Tyler Christopher	Signore Christofero	2001
Tyler Christopher	Stefan DiMera	2017–2019
William Christopher	Father Tobias	2012
Max and Sam Christy	Zack Brady	2001
Zach Chyz	Tom Horton	2024
Jamie Chung	Cordy Han	2007
Charles Cioffi	Ernesto Toscano	1990
Christie Clark	Carrie Brady	1986–1999, 2005–2006, 2010–2012, 2017–2019, 2025
Jeffrey Clark	Jeremy Horton	1989
John Clarke	Mickey Horton	1965–2004
Melinda Clarke	Faith Taylor	1989–90
Robert Clary	Robert LeClair	1972–73, 1975–83, 1986–87
Tamara Clatterbuck	Barb Reiber	2001–02
Clive Clerk	David Martin	1966–67
Annalisa Cochrane	Alyssa Trout	2017
Jack Coleman	Jake Kositchek	1981–82
Douglas Coler	Dr Piccard	1996–2000
Kim Coles	Whitley King	2023, 2025
Richard A. Colla	Tony Merritt	1965–66
Mark Collier	Liam Frasier	2013–14
Jolina Collins	Jasmine	1984–85
Mark Colson	Gabriel	1994–95, 2021
Corinne Conley	Phyllis Anderson	1973–82
Darlene Conley	Edith Baker	1983
Kathy Connell	Bonnie Lockhart	2000–02
Jason Cook	Shawn-Douglas Brady	1999–2006, 2015
Lawrence Cook	Paul Grant	1975–76
John Corbett	Hospital Administrator	1995–96
Amanda Corday	Karin	2013
Megan Corletto	Abigail Deveraux	2001–03
Daniel Cosgrove	Aiden Jennings	2014–16
Paul Coufos	Mike Horton	1981–82
Brendan Coughlin	Tad "T" Stevens	2009–2015
Barbara Crampton	Trista Evans	1983–1984
Ellen Crawford	Mother Superior	2022
Nikki Crawford	Lexie Carver	2026
Roark Critchlow	Mike Horton	1994–99, 2010, 2022, 2025
Denise Crosby	Lisa Davis	1980
Jason Culp	Jerry Pulaski	1989
Rusty Cundieff	Theo Carver	1985
Sonia Curtis	Nancy Pearson	1985–86
Robert Cuthill	Colin Murphy	2001
Barry Cutler	Logan "Parrot Man" Michaels	1995–1996
Stuart Damon	Jim Ford	2010
Linda Dano	Vivian Alamain	2021
Patrika Darbo	Nancy Wesley	1998–2005, 2013, 2016–17, 2019, 2022, 2024
Bryan Dattilo	Lucas Horton	1993–2010, 2012–2024
Brant Daugherty	Brian	2012–2013
Marty Davich	Marty	1977–1993
Eileen Davidson	Kristen DiMera	1993–98, 2012–15, 2017, 2021
Eileen Davidson	Marlena Evans	1995, 2021
Eileen Davidson	Susan Banks	1996–98, 2014, 2017, 2021
Eileen Davidson	Sister Mary Moira Banks	1997–98, 2017
Eileen Davidson	Thomas Banks	1997, 2023
Eileen Davidson	Penelope Kent	1998
Lane Davies	Evan Whyland	1981–82
Brian Davila	Andrew Donovan	1991–92
Billy Davis Jr.	Billy	2019–20
Jesse Davis	Eric Brady	1985–86
Jessica Davis	Sami Brady	1985–86
John de Lancie	Eugene Bradford	1982–86, 1989–90
John de Lancie	André DiMera	1983
Floy Dean	Laura Horton	1966
Max Decker	Max	2010
Max Decker	Zig	2011
Dick DeCoit	Mike Horton	1973
Casey Deidrick	Chad DiMera	2009–13
Diane Delano	Olga	1994–97
Diane Delano	Hilda Van Beno	2008-2009
Pat Delany	Rachel Blake	1995–96
Alma Delfina	Adriana Hernandez	2016
Jack De Mave	Dr. Gregory Eldrige	1998
Andy Demetrio	Milos	2017
Jack Denbo	Jack Clayton	1974–77
Kassie DePaiva	Eve Donovan	2014–20, 2023
Robb Derringer	Scooter Nelson	2017
Francis DeSales	Dr. Jim Spencer	1965-71
Francis DeSales	Rusty Lincoln	1965-71
Alan Dexter	Frank Ferguson	1965–66
Don Diamont	Carlo Forenza	1984
Charles Dierkop	Rocko	1984
Michael Dietz	Jeffrey Russell	2025
Bradford Dillman	J.J.	1973
Susan Diol	Emmy Borden	1990–91
Kevin Dobson	Mickey Horton	2008
Charla Doherty	Julie Olson	1965–66
Trent Dolan	Allen Hamlin	1980
Trent Dolan	Private Detective Steel	1988
Trent Dolan	Commissioner Samuels	1992
Elinor Donahue	Kate Honeycutt	1984–86
Trevor Donovan	Jeremy Horton	2007
Burt Douglas	Jim Fisk	1965–66
Jason Downs	Rhodes	2021
Frederic Downs	Hank Wilson	1973–80
Mark Drexler	Roger Lombard	1992
Denice Duff	Wendy Taylor	2015, 2018
Catherine Dunn	Julie Olson	1967
Conrad Dunn (aka George Jenesky)	Nick Corelli	1981–84, 1986–91
Ximena Duque	Blanca	2016
Isabel Durant	Claire Brady	2020–21
Kim Durso	Melissa Horton	1975–76
Marj Dusay	Vivian Alamain	1992–93
Steve Eastin	Alfred Jericho	1989–90
Michael Easton	Tanner Scofield	1991–92
Jane Elliot	Anjelica Deveraux	1987–89
Dexter & Jaxton Ellis	David	2019
Katherine Ellis	Taylor Walker	1998–99
John Enos III	Radio Broadcaster	2008
John Enos III	Roger Fisher	2017–18
Stephanie Erb	Mona	2001
Rob Estes	Glenn Gallagher	1986–87
Wesley Eure	Mike Horton	1974–81
Delaney and Parker Evans	Henry Horton	2020
Joseph Trent Everett	Melissa Horton	1971
Morgan Fairchild	Anjelica Deveraux	2017
Kavi Faquir	Theo Carver	2006–07
Mike Farrell	Scott Banning	1968–70
Frank Fata	Stefano DiMera	1991
Farah Fath	Mimi Lockhart	1999–2007, 2018
Melinda O. Fee	Mary Anderson	1981–82
Doren Fein	Mimi Lockhart	1999
Catherine Ferrar	Julie Olson	1967–68
Ayda Field	Angela Moroni	2000–01
Brianna and Chalice Fischette	Belle Black	1993–95
Brenden and Dillon Fisher	John Thomas Reiber	2000
Frances Fisher	Gladys	2011
Susan Flannery	Laura Horton	1966–75
Sara Fletcher	Jill	2016
Sara Fletcher	Ava Vitali	2017
Matthew Florida	Ford Decker	2007
Billy Flynn	Chad DiMera	2014–2026
Alina Foley	Claire Brady	2008
Michael Forest	Corley Maxwell	1979
Michael Forest	Walker Coleman	1987
Michael Forest	Dr. Remy	1990
Holgie Forrester	Caroline Brady	2019
Rosemary Forsyth	Laura Horton	1976–80
Bren Foster	Quinn Hudson	2011–12
Kingston Foster	Arianna Horton	2019
Jayna & Kinsley Fox	Henry Horton	2020
Vivica A. Fox	Carmen Silva	1988
Don Frabotta	Dave	1974–93, 2000–04
Angelique Francis	Lexie Carver	1989–90, 1992
Genie Francis	Diana Colville	1987–89
Mary Frann	Amanda Howard Peters	1974–79
Garrett and Spencer Fraye	Zack Brady	2001–06
John Gabriel	Peter LeGrand	2002
Holly Gagnier	Ivy Selejko Jannings	1985–87
Gina Gallego	Jane Smith	2010–11
Joseph Gallison	Neil Curtis	1974–91
Winnie Gardner	Daisy Hawkins	1983
Joy Garrett	Jo Johnson	1987–93
Justin Gaston	Ben Weston	2014
Bennye Gatteys	Susan Hunter Martin	1973–76
Dan Gauthier	Peter Blake	2025–2026
Autumn Gendron	Charlotte DiMera	2021–2026
Gil Gerard	Major Dodd	1997
Jason Gerhardt	Eric Brady	2023
Christopher Gerse	Will Horton	2003–08
Donald Gibb	Leader	1998
Marla Gibbs	Olivia Price	2021–2022
Jody Gibson	Sunny Chandler	1984
Ella and Anna Gietzen	Allie Horton	2009
Kathie Lee Gifford	Nurse Callahan	1978
Dick Gitting	Bob Anderson	1978
Regina Gleason	Kitty Horton	1967–69
Cyndi James Gossett	Lexie Carver	1987–89
Victoria Grace	Wendy Shin	2022–2024
Andoni Gracia	Mateo	2016, 2018
Coleen Gray	Diane Hunter	1966–67
Staci Greason	Isabella Toscano	1989–92, 1995, 2000, 2002–03, 2010
Staci Greason	Marlena Evans	1995
Brian Lane Green	Alan Brand	1987–88
Jeff Griggs	Jude St. Clair	1995–96
Scott Groff	Shawn-Douglas Brady	1990–95
Clyde and Nash Gunderson	Henry Horton	2021–22
Amanda and Jessica Gunnarson	Stephanie Johnson	1990–92
Richard Guthrie	David Banning	1975–80
Ivan G'Vera	Ivan Marais	1991–2000, 2011, 2020–21
Andrea Hall	Samantha Evans	1977–80, 1982
Andrea Hall	Hattie Adams	2000–01
Tom Hallick	Maxwell Hathaway	1984
Bradley Hallock	Eric Brady	1986–92
Alice Halsey	Rachel Black	2025–2026
Lynn Hamilton	Rita Carver	1987
James Hampton	Saul Taylor	1989
Hyrum Hansen	Chase Jennings	2014
Mark Hapka	Johnny DiMera	2007–08
Mark Hapka	Nathan Horton	2009–11
Lindsay Hartley	Arianna Hernandez	2009–10
Jade Harlow	Sheryl Connors	2014
Dianne Harper	Leslie James	1979–80
Amyrh Harris	Theo Carver	2007
Nadia and Talia Hartounian	Sydney DiMera	2013–14
Alan Haufrect	Rudy	1988
Alan Haufrect	Dr Dorman	1993–94
Gabrielle Haugh	Jade Michaels	2017
Scotty Hauser	Eric Brady	1997
Scotty Hauser	Jimmy	2000
Bill Hayes	Doug Williams	1970–1984, 1986–1987, 1993–1996, 1999–2024
Bill Hayes	Byron Carmichael	1979
Rick Hearst	Scotty Banning	1989–90
Wayne Heffley	Vern Scofield	1988–93, 2002–03, 2006
Brian Heidik	Tim Rollins	1992–93
Shelley Hennig	Stephanie Johnson	2007–11, 2017
Zak Henri	Henry	2015–16
Stephen Anthony Henry	Luke	1986–88
Lynn Herring	Lisanne Gardner	1992
Darby Hinton	Ian Griffith	1985–86
Remington Hoffman	Li Shin	2020–2024
Robert Hogan	Will Austin	1969
Robert Hogan	Scott Banning	1970–71
Drake Hogestyn	John Black	1986–2009, 2011–2024
Drake Hogestyn	Marlena Evans	2021
Victor Holchak	Jim Phillips	1971–1976
Ashlee Holland	Crystal Miller	2007–2008
Anne Marie Howard	Kimberly Brady	1990–91
Lisa Howard	April Ramirez	1988–91
Cady Huffman	Calista Lockhart	2021
Billy Hufsey	Emilio Ramirez	1988–91
Rif Hutton	False Newscaster	1990
Ron Husmann	Tony Merritt	1966–67
Adam Huss	Patron	2002
Patricia Huston	Addie Horton Olson	1965–66
Brody Hutzler	Patrick Lockhart	2004–07
John Ingle	Mickey Horton	2004–06
Vincent Irizarry	Deimos Kiriakis	2016–17, 2021
Stan Ivar	Daniel Scott	1994–96
Greg Jackson	Jeremiah	2014–15
Roy Jackson	Tim Myers	2009–11
Jill Jacobson	Nurse Nancy	1995
Lisa Jay	Lauren Chaffee	2006–07
Barry Jenner	Matt MacKenzie	1985
Kenneth Jezek	Lars Englund	1986–87
Patti Johns	J.J. Bagwood	1989–90
Cameron Johnson	Theo Carver	2020–2023
Chase and Tyler Johnson	Theo Carver	2003–04
Jay Kenneth Johnson	Philip Kiriakis	1999–2002, 2007–11, 2020–21
Jamison Jones	Kip	2010
Dot-Marie Jones	Chille	2016
Renée Jones	Nikki Wade	1982–83
Renée Jones	Lexie Carver	1993–2012
Shirley Jones	Colleen Brady	2008
S. Marc Jordan	Eli Jacobs	1986–87, 1989
Vivian Jovanni	Ciara Brady	2015–17
Bill Joyce	Kellam Chandler	1980–81
Jacee Jule	Patty	1997–2004
Connor Kalopsis	Chase Jennings	2014–15
Stanley Kamel	Eric Peters	1972–76
Holly Kaplan	Brenda	2000–03
Valerie Karasek	Serena Colville	1987–88
Michael Kearns	Hank	1985
Olivia Rose Keegan	Claire Brady	2015–20
Paul Keenan	Todd Chandler	1980–81
Robert Kelker-Kelly	Bo Brady	1992–95
Brock Kelly	Josh	2005–06
Brock Kelly	Evan Frears	2019–22
Susan Keller	Mary Anderson	1980
Harris Kendall	Marie	1993–2003
Lucas Kerr	Clint	2015
Paul Kersey	Alan Harris	1993–95
Paige and Ryanne Kettner	Abigail Deveraux	1994–98, 2000–01
Andre Khabbazi	Henry Shah	2017–18
Madelyn Kientz	Sophia Choi	2024–25
Rachel Kimsey	Meredith Hudson	2009
Sally Kirkland	Tracey Simpson	1999
Tracy Kolis	Rebecca Downey	1989–90
Yvonna Kopacz	Wendy Reardon	1996–97
Alla Korot	Janet Bernard	2016
Pamela Kosh	Lavinia Peach	1986–87, 1991–92
Katie Krell	Sarah Horton	1982–83
Elle and Ithaca Kremer	Allie Horton	2007–08
Wortham Krimmer	Cal Winters	1989–90
Ron Kuhlman	Jimmy Porterfield	1984–85
Mila Kunis	Hope Williams	1994
Aaron and Griffin Kunitz	Johnny DiMera	2009–14
James Lancaster	Father Tim Jansen	2003–06, 2008
Clayton Landey	Gregory Lacost	1990–92
Jennifer Landon	Hillary Nelson	2017
Shauna Lane-Block	Sarah Horton	1989
Adrienne La Russa	Brooke Hamilton	1975–77
James Lastovic	Joey Johnson	2015–17, 2020
Veronica Lauren	Cynthia Austin	2001–02, 2007
Ron Leath	Henderson	1987–2004, 2008–17
Jennifer Lee	Lexie Carver	2021
Stuart Lee	Mike Horton	1973
Sung Hi Lee	Sophie	2005
Alicia Leigh Willis	Debra Frazier	2014
Roberta Leighton	Ginger Dawson	1991–92
Michael Leon	Pete Jannings	1983–86
Floyd Levine	Lou Stanley	1985
Ketty Lester	Helen Grant	1975–77
Philip Levien	Mitch Kauffman	1986–87
Colin Lewis	Sarah Horton	1981
Thyme Lewis	Jonah Carver	1993–97
Alyssa and Lauren Libby	John Thomas Reiber	2000–01
Jen Lilley	Theresa Donovan	2013–2016, 2018, 2023
Lisa Linde	Ali McIntyre	1998–99
Heather Lindell	Jan Spears	2004–05, 2020–22
Jon Lindstrom	Jack Deveraux	2020
Joyce Little	Vanessa Walker	1988
Natalia Livingston	Taylor Walker	2011
Paul Logan	Glen Reiber	2001–02, 2005
Cody Longo	Nicholas Alamain	2011
Gloria Loring	Liz Chandler	1980–1986, 2024
Michael Lowry	Dr Snyder	2021
Alex and Max Lucero	Brady Black	1992–94
William Lucking	Harry Chaney	1981
James Luisi	Duke Johnson	1987, 1990–92
James Luisi	Earl Johnson	1989
Leslie Lunceford	Kristen DiMera	1996
Jim Lunsford	Benjy Hawk	2006–07
John Lupton	Tommy Horton	1967–73, 1975–80
Meredith Scott Lynn	Anne Milbauer	2012–17
Debbie Lytton	Melissa Horton	1977–80, 1982
Ernesto Macias	Ernesto Toscano	1990
Peter MacLean	Shawn Brady	1989–90
Elizabeth MacRae	Barbara Randolph	1976
Elizabeth MacRae	Phyllis Anderson	1977
Tanner Maguire	Shawn Brady	2007
Matthew Mahaney	Kurt Schwengel	1999–2000
Robert Mailhouse	Brian Scofield	1990–92
Christina Maisano	Noelle Curtis	1983
Edward Mallory	Bill Horton	1966–80, 1991–93
Harlow & Scarlett Mallory	Holly Jonas	2018–20
Robert Mandan	Steven "Jonesy" Jones	1997–98
Stephen Manley	Billy Barton	1977–78
Jamie Martin Mann	Tate Black	2023–2024
Mike Manning	Charlie Dale	2020–2022
Kate Mansi	Abigail Deveraux	2011–2016, 2018–2020
Scott Marlowe	Eric Brady	1984
Piter Marek	Henry Shah	2019
Gilles Marini	Ted Laurent	2018–2019
Lynne Marta	Charlene Higgins	1983
Lynne Marta	Zantra	1993
Lynne Marta	Fortune Teller	2003
Anne-Marie Martin	Gwen Davies	1982–85
John H. Martin	Bill Horton	2010
Millicent Martin	Lili Faversham	1998–2001
A Martinez	Eduardo Hernandez	2015–17, 2020
Gregg Marx	David Banning	1981–83
Joseph Mascolo	Dr Tufano	1967
Joseph Mascolo	Stefano DiMera	1982–85, 1988, 1993–2001, 2006–16
Joseph Mascolo	Stefano imposter	1996
Joseph Mascolo	Shane Donovan	2017
Margaret Mason	Linda Phillips Anderson	1970–72, 1975–80, 1982
Gabriella Massari	Jeannie Donovan	1992
Andrew Hyatt Masset	Larry Welch	1983–85, 2002–03, 2016
Braden Matthews	Travis Malloy	1997
Brian Matthews	Brother Francis	1985–86
Robin Mattson	Lee Michaels	2010–11
Melonie Mazman	Tess Jannings	1984
Diane McBain	Foxy Humdinger	1982–84
Peggy McCay	Caroline Brady	1983, 1985–2016
Cady McClain	Jennifer Horton	2020–2024
Cady McClain	Laura Horton	2021
Jonathon McClendon	Chase Jennings	2015–16
Brianna and Brittany McConnell	Belle Black	1995–98
Marilyn McCoo	Tamara Price	1986–87, 2019–20
Kristi McDaniel	Sarah	1995–96
Ryan MacDonald	Scott Banning	1971–73
Marilyn McIntyre	Jo Johnson	1993, 2002–03, 2006
David McLean	Craig Merritt	1965–67
Allyn Ann McLerie	Rhea Edwards	1973
Thia Megia	Haley Chen	2018–20
Justin Melvey	Colin Murphy	2001–04
Rachel Melvin	Chelsea Brady	2005–2009, 2023
Ashlyn and Kaylyn Messick	Belle Black	1998
Peyton Meyer	Doug Williams III	2024–2025
Tracy Middendorf	Carrie Brady	1992
Marci Miller	Abigail Deveraux	2016–18, 2020–23
Marci Miller	Jennifer Horton	2021
Mark Miller	J.R. Barnett	1975–76
Eric Mills	Matt Burns	1985–86
Dani Minnick	Rebecca Downey	1993
Karen Moncrieff	Gabrielle Pascal	1987–88
Emily Montague	Abigail Deveraux	2007
Deborah Moore	Danielle Stevens	1992
Camilla More	Gillian Forrester	1986–87
Camilla More	Grace Forrester	1987–88
Carey More	Grace Forrester	1987
Shelley Taylor Morgan	Anjelica Deveraux	1989
Julianne Morris	Greta Von Amberg	1998–2002
Gregory Mortensen	Paul Stewart	1986
Patrick Muldoon	Austin Reed	1992–95, 2011–12
Mandy Musgrave	Chelsea Brady	2004–05
Steve Nave	Ed	1983–88
Wolf Muser	Dr. Hochman	2016
Herbert Nelson	Phil Peters	1972–75
Meghan and Michael Nelson	Abigail Deveraux	1992–94
Jasper Newman	Colin Bedford	2023
Yvette Nipar	Sasha Roberts	1987
Martha Nix	Janice Barnes	1975–78
Heather North	Sandy Horton	1967–71
Wayne Northrop	Roman Brady	1981–84, 1991–94
Wayne Northrop	André DiMera	1983
Wayne Northrop	Alex North	2005–06
True O'Brien	Paige Larson	2014–15, 2017, 2020
Michael O'Connor	Dimitri	1991–92
Collin O'Donnell	Shawn-Douglas Brady	1995–99
Michael O'Neil	Father Tim Jansen	1996
Kate Orsini	Gate attendant	2008
Kate Orsini	French cop	2012
Jenna Ortega	Hayley	2013
Terry O'Sullivan	Richard Hunter	1966–67
Alyshia Ochse	Sara	2009
Alyshia Ochse	Zoey Burge	2020
John Oliver	Devlin St. John	2026
Susan Oliver	Laura Horton	1975–1976
Heather Lauren Olson	Billie Reed	1994
Heather Lauren Olson	Jan Spears	1999–2004
Jack Ong	Dr Wu	1993
Rhasaan Orange	Tek Kramer	2003–07
Kristina Osterhout	Hope Brady	1974
Nathan Owens	Cameron Davis	2012–13
Justin Page	Andrew Donovan	1989
Allison Paige	Bev Walters	2013–15
Scott Palmer	Joshua Fallon	1981–82
Frank Parker	Shawn Brady	1983–2008
Miriam Parrish	Jamie Caldwell	1993–96
Nancy Parsons	Mary Brooke	1996
Robert Parucha	Eddie Reed	1988–89
Marcus Patrick	Jett Carver	2007
Dylan Patton	Will Horton	2009–10
Patsy Pease	Kimberly Brady	1984–92, 1994, 1996–98, 2002–04, 2008, 2010, 2013–16
Austin Peck	Austin Reed	1995–2002, 2005–06, 2017
J. Eddie Peck	Howard 'Hawk' Hawkins	1991–92
Nia Peeples	Mallory	1983
Jerry Penacoli	Miles Malloy	2000, 2013–14
Charlotte and Stella Penfield	Allie Horton	2008
Joe Penny	Martino Vitali	2008
Sydney Penny	Dr Norman	2011
Jennifer Peterson	Jennifer Horton	1977–79
Kyler Pettis	Theo Carver	2015–18
Jay Pickett	Chip Lakin	1991–92
Bradley Michael Pierce	Andrew Donovan	1990–91
Emily and Alicia Pillatzke	Theresa Donovan	1991–92
Daniel Pilon	Gavin Newirth	1992
Julie Pinson	Billie Reed	2004–08
Victoria Platt	Amanda Raynor	2020–21
Larry Poindexter	Ben Welch	1984
Larry Poindexter	Father Louis	2014
Robert Poynton	John Black	1985–86
Elaine Princi	Kate Winograd	1977–79
Elaine Princi	Linda Phillips Anderson	1984–85
Avalon, Dillon and Vincent Ragone	EJ DiMera	1997–98
Charity Rahmer	Belle Black	2004
Natalie Ramsey	Jan Spears	1999
Wes Ramsey	Owen Kent	2009, 2026
Terrell Ransom, Jr.	Theo Carver	2008–15
Terrell Ransom, Jr.	Jerry Prentiss	2023
James Read	Clyde Weston	2014–24
Marie-Alise Recasner	Lynn Burke	1994–98
Quinn Redeker	Alex Marshall	1979–87
Jacob and Micah Reeves	JJ Deveraux	2004–06
Scott Reeves	Jake Hogansen	1988
Mick Regan	Nick	1986
Frances Reid	Alice Horton	1965–2007
Tara Reid	Ashley	1995
Randy Reinholz	Adam Scott	1989
Kristen Renton	Morgan Hollingsworth	2007–08
Marissa Reyes	Arianna Horton	2025–2026
Tony Rhodes	Jesse Lombard	1992
Michael Rhoton	Max Brady	1986–87
Madlyn Rhue	Daphne DiMera	1982–84
Kyle Richards	Casey McGraw	2013
Hal Riddle	Max	1971–75
Robin Riker	Bonnie Lockhart	2000
LeAnn Rimes	Madison	1998
Lisa Rinna	Billie Reed	1992–1995, 2002–2003, 2012–2013, 2018
Jacob and Joshua Rips	Zack Brady	2000–2002
Michael Roark	Jeremy Horton	2025–2026
Richard Roat	Conrad Hutton	1985
Richard Roat	Professor Henry Moore	1991
DeAnna Robbins	Diane Parker	1984–1985
Bumper Robinson	Jonah Carver	1987–88, 1990–91
Jay Robinson	Monty Dolan	1988–89
Gabriela Rodriguez	Gabi Hernandez	2009–10
Francesco Romano	Roberto Barelli	1998–2001
Robert Romanus	Speed Selejko	1983–85
Campbell and Carolyn Rose	Allie Horton	2009–14
Shayna Rose	Stephanie Johnson	2006–07
Charlotte Ross	Eve Donovan	1987–91
Franc Ross	Duck	2007
Paige Rowland	Debra Thomas	1997
Pamela Roylance	Sandy Horton	1983–84
Reed Rudy	Max II	1997–98
Derya Ruggles	Robin Jacobs	1985–87, 1989
Sky Rumph	Andrew Donovan	1989–90
Fran Ryan	Rosie Carlson	1976–79
Natasha Ryan	Hope Brady	1975–80
Christopher Saavedra	Frankie Brady	1990
Michael Sabatino	Lawrence Alamain	1990–93, 2009–11
Pat Sajak	Kevin Hathaway	1983
Philece Sampler	Renée DuMonde	1981–84
Francisco San Martín	Javier Rodriguez	2010
Francisco San Martín	Dario Hernandez	2011
Lanna Saunders	Marie Horton	1979–85
Rick Scarry	The Funeral Director	2009
Eric Schiff	Kevin Cates	1985
Stephen Schnetzer	Steven Olson	1978–1980, 2024–2025
Colin and Kyle Schroeder	Tate Black	2018
Camilla Scott	Melissa Horton	1990–91
James Scott	E.J. DiMera	2006–14
James Scott	Santo DiMera	2007–08
Jean Bruce Scott	Jessica Blake	1980–82, 2012
Ryan Scott	Harold Wentworth	2001–03
Jocelyn Seagrave	Tanya Hampstead	1994
Paige Searcy	Jade Michaels	2016–17
Anthony Seaward	Sarah Horton	1981–82
Noah Segan	Conner Lockhart	2007
Jessica Serfaty	Sloan Petersen	2022–24
Aketra Sevillian	Talia Hunter	2023
Scott Shilstone	Zack Brady	2016
Scott Shilstone	Wyatt	2017–2018
Davide Shiavone	Stefano DiMera	2007
Geno Silva	Domingo Salazar	1991
Hannah Taylor Simmons	Jeannie Donovan	1990–1991
Freddie Smith	Sonny Kiriakis	2011–2020
Martha Smith	Sandy Horton	1982
Michael Dwight Smith	Scott Banning	1975–78
Sydney K. Smith	Alice Horton	2024
Norman Snow	Duke Rupert Harriman	1998–2000
Diane Sommerfield	Valerie Grant	1981–82
Louise Sorel	Vivian Alamain	1992–2000, 2009–2011, 2017–2018, 2020, 2023–2026
Arleen Sorkin	Calliope Jones	1984–90, 1992, 2001, 2006, 2010
Aaron D. Spears	Lt. Raines	2016–17
Kevin Spirtas	Craig Wesley	1997–2003, 2005, 2009, 2022
Taylor Spreitler	Mia McCormick	2009–10
Jerry Springer	Pete	2007
Nick Stabile	Dean Hartman	2009
Barbara Stanger	Mary Anderson	1976–80
Chrishell Stause	Jordan Ridgeway	2013–2015, 2019–2021
Chrishell Stause	Nick Fallon	2023
Richard Steinmetz	Robert Smails	2021
Nancy Stephens	Mary Anderson	1975
Maren Stephenson	Jennifer Horton	1976–77
Kaye Stevens	Jeri Clayton	1974–79
K. T. Stevens	Helen Martin	1966–67, 1969
Charles C. Stevenson Jr.	Gerard	2004
Catherine Mary Stewart	Kayla Brady	1982–83
Tanner Stine	Joey Johnson	2022–2023
David St. James	Tony Love	1992
Amy Stock	Britta Englund	1986
Jalen Stokes	Demarquette	2007
Christopher Stone	Bill Horton	1987–88, 1994
Larry Storch	Older French Man	1996
Elizabeth Storm	Janice Barnes	1987–88
Kirsten Storms	Belle Black	1999–2004
Robin Strasser	Vivian Alamain	2019
Paul Strickland	Chuck	1990–99
Rhonda Stubbins White	Lady Vi	2000
Shannon Sturges	Molly Brinker	1991–92
Mark Tapscott	Bob Anderson	1972–80
Tammy Tavares	Karen Bader	1995–96, 1998–2003, 2005–06
Tammy Taylor	Hope Williams Brady	1981–82
Michael Teh	Vincent Belman	2020–21
Felisha Terrell	Arianna Hernandez	2009
Brynn Thayer	Susan Banks	2011
Kelly Thiebaud	Alicia	2011
Kelly Thiebaud	Zoey Burge	2020
Serena Scott Thomas	Fiona Cook	2024
Gordon Thomson	Walter Kent	2009
Alexis Thorpe	Cassie Brady	2002–05
Angelo Tiffe	Angelo Vitali	2008, 2017, 2021
Zach Tinker	Sonny Kiriakis	2022–2024
Beverly Todd	Celeste Perrault	2012
Tammy Townsend	Wendy Reardon	1994–96
Ty Treadway	Ben Walters	2010–11
Alexander Trumble	Jeff	2018
Lisa Trusel	Melissa Horton	1983–88, 1994, 1996, 2002, 2010
Jessica Tuck	Madeline Peterson Woods	2010
Tamara Tunie	Judge Weston	2011
Donnell Turner	Aiden Williams	2009–10
Shannon Tweed	Savannah Wilder	1985–86
Brandon Tyler	Philip Kiriakis	1999
Hunter Tylo	Marina Toscano	1989–90
Harper & Sydnee Udell	Arianna Horton	2013–19
William Utay	Wilhelm Rolf	1997–2003, 2007–08, 2017–21
Darrell Thomas Utley	Benjy Hawk	1988–90
Mark Valley	Jack Deveraux	1994–97
Joan Van Ark	Janie Whitney	1970
Dick Van Dyke	Timothy Robicheaux	2023
Peter Van Norden	Pawnbroker	2004
Greg Vaughan	Eric Brady	2012–2025
Jordi Vilasuso	Dario Hernandez	2016–17
Richard Voigts	Mickey Horton	2004
Aaron Van Wagner	Jason Welles	1999–2002, 2007
Eddie Velez	Paul Mendez	2001–03
Glen Vincent	John Black	1985
Erik von Detten	Nicholas Alamain	1992–93
Caitlin Wachs	Jeannie Donovan	1992
Christina Wagoner	Sami Brady	1990–92
Casey Wallace	Kimberly Brady	1992
David Wallace	Todd Chandler	1985–86
Denise Wanner	Adrienne Johnson Kiriakis	1986
Gillian Iliana Waters	Cassandra "China Lee" Arvin	2007
Gregory Wagrowski	Jake Sellers	1985–87
Billy Warlock	Frankie Brady	1986–88, 1990–91, 2005–06
Tionne Watkins	Sheila Watkins	2016–20
Precious Way	Chanel Dupree	2021
Patty Weaver	Trish Clayton Banning	1974–82
Kimberly Weber	Hope Williams	1974–75
Diana Webster	Lavinia Peach	1985–86
Victor Webster	Nicholas Alamain	1999–2000
Carl Weintraub	Vincent Moroni	2000–02
Darian Weiss	Will Roberts	2002–03
Michael T. Weiss	Mike Horton	1985–90
Dan Wells	Sami Brady	2005, 2021
Craig Welzbacher	Myron	2016–17
Anna Werner	Eliana	1996–2003
Sean Whalen	Ted	2014
Betty White	Nurse	1988
Betty White	Teacher	1988
Olivia and Ava White	Claire Kiriakis	2006–07
Anne Whitfield	Barbara Harris	1965-66
Nancy Wickwire	Phyllis Anderson	1972–73
Steve Wilder	Jack Deveraux	1997–98
Valerie Wildman	Fay Walker	1999–2003, 2009–11
Brett Williams	Todd Chandler	1980
Jeffrey Williams	David Banning	1970–73
Lisa Williams	Lisa	1992–2004, 2006–07
Guy Wilson	Will Horton	2014–15
Marie Wilson	Bree Tjaden	2014–15
Marie Wilson	Summer Townsend	2016, 2020
Miranda Wilson	Megan Hathaway	1984–85, 2023
Jane Windsor	Emma Donovan Marshall	1985–87
Eric Winter	Rex Brady	2002–05
Ray Wise	Hal Rummley	1982–83
Howard Witt	Joe Burke	1980
Karin Wolfe	Mary Anderson	1972–75
Austin Wolff	Conner Lockhart	1999
Robert S. Woods	Paul Stewart	1986–87
Katherine Woodville	Marie Horton	1977
Morgan Woodward	Philip Colville	1987–88
Aloma Wright	Jillian	2007
Aloma Wright	Maxine Landis	2008–15
Schuyler Yancey	Cameron Davis	2010–12
Amy Yasbeck	Olivia Reed	1986–87
Merritt Yohnka	Joey	1984–90
Francine York	Lorraine Farr Temple	1978
Shelby Young	Kinsey	2009–11
Paul Zachary	Shawn-Douglas Brady	1990
Suzanne Zenor	Margo Horton	1977–80, 1986
Arianne Zucker	Nicole Walker	1998–2006, 2008–2024
Arianne Zucker	Helena Tasso	2016
Arianne Zucker	Kristen DiMera	2019

== See also ==
- List of Days of Our Lives cast members
