= Max Brady =

- Days of our Lives character
- Darin Brooks as Max Brady
- Portrayed by: Michael Rhoton (1986–1987); Adrian Arnold (1987); Ryan Brennan (1987–1992); Darin Brooks (2005–2010)
- Duration: 1986–1988; 1990–1992; 2005–2010
- First appearance: July 25, 1986
- Last appearance: March 16, 2010
- Created by: Sheri Anderson, Thom Racina and Leah Laiman
- Introduced by: Betty Corday, Ken Corday and Al Rabin
In-universe information
- Other names: Maxwell Becker; Maxwell Brady
- Occupation: Bartender; Pub manager; Bar manager; Airline Investor; Garage owner; Racecar Driver; Doctor
- Family: Brady
- Father: Trent Robbins
- Adoptive parents: Shawn Brady; Caroline Brady
- Brothers: Roman Brady (adoptive); Frankie Brady (adoptive)
- Sisters: Kimberly Brady (adoptive); Kayla Brady (adoptive)
- Half-brothers: Bo Brady (adoptive)
- Half-sisters: Melanie Jonas (adoptive)
- Children: Isaac Brady
- Grandfathers: Peter Brady (adoptive)
- Uncles: Eric Brady (adoptive)
- Aunts: Colleen Brady (adoptive); Molly Brady (adoptive)
- Nephews: Eric Brady (adoptive); Rex Brady (adoptive); Andrew Donovan (adoptive); Joey Johnson (adoptive); Shawn-Douglas Brady (adoptive); Zack Brady (adoptive)
- Nieces: Carrie Brady (adoptive); Sami Brady (adoptive); Cassie Brady (adoptive); Theresa Donovan (adoptive); Stephanie Johnson (adoptive); Chelsea Brady (adoptive); Ciara Brady (adoptive)
- First cousins: Ryan Brady (adoptive); Colin Murphy (adoptive)

Max Brady is a fictional character on the soap opera Days of Our Lives, and was portrayed by Darin Brooks from June 21, 2005, to July 7, 2009, and March 15 and 16, 2010. In November 2012, Brooks hinted on social media that he was possibly contemplating reprising the role of Max Brady in the near future; however, he ultimately did not return.

== Storylines ==
Max is given away by his father Trent Becker at an early age. He is taken under the protective wing of Frankie Donner, now Frankie Brady (Billy Warlock). Frankie and Max make their way to Salem. They are taken in by kindhearted Steven Johnson and his wife Kayla Brady Johnson. Frankie and Max are legally adopted by Kayla's parents Shawn and Caroline Brady (Peggy McCay). The boys gain brothers Roman and Bo Brady and sisters Kimberly and Kayla Brady. Shortly thereafter, both boys leave town.

In mid-2005, more than a decade later, Jennifer Horton Deveraux (Melissa Reeves) runs into Max at the racetrack and renews ties with both him and Frankie. Once back in Salem, Max is immediately drawn to Chelsea Brady, his adoptive niece. When Chelsea is blamed for the accidental death of Zack Brady, Max stands by her side and keeps her dark secret for as long as possible. Max eventually breaks up with Chelsea, feeling she is too immature for him. He briefly dates fellow race car driver Stephanie Johnson, who also happens to be his adoptive niece.

Max then briefly dates his nephew Shawn-Douglas' soon-to-be-ex-wife Mimi Lockhart. During that same time, Max employs Abigail Deveraux (Ashley Benson), Steve's niece, at his garage. Since his brother Frankie is engaged to Abigail's mother Jennifer, she is expected to be his future step-niece. When Mimi experiences a variety of personal and family difficulties, he tries to stand by her, but ultimately confides in Abigail that he finds it difficult and does not know what to do with his life. Abigail admits she is jealous of his relationship with Mimi and that she has had a crush on him for a long time. When Mimi leaves town soon thereafter, Max and Abigail date until she leaves Salem as well.

Jeremy Horton, Jennifer's nephew, convinces Max to become his financial officer for Touch the Sky Airlines and also to join his side business of smuggling of what he believes to be designer clothes. It is eventually revealed that the airline and clothes smuggling were both fronts for a human trafficking ring, and Max loses his garage in the subsequent investigation.

Max then renews his relationship with Stephanie, and supports her as she deals with her rape at the hands of Ford Decker. Later, Max's actions cause confusion and he is alienated by his friends. It seems he is trying to interfere with Nick Fallon's proposal for a grant to develop green energy, but in actuality he ends up correcting errors in a way that demonstrates a significant competence in mathematics and science. Max's biological father reemerges as Trent Robbins, the dean of the physics department at Salem University, as well as his half-sister Melanie Layton. Max is a suspect in Trent's death, but it turns out that Nick killed Trent so he could be with Melanie, Trent's daughter.

Due to the confusion of Trent's impact on Max, Stephanie begins to have trust issues with Max. Though she stands by his side, she does not like Max's newly-found sister, Melanie. Melanie is a troublemaker and Stephanie thinks she was just trying to break her and Max up. Stephanie and Max eventually end their relationship due to Melanie and trust issues. After the breakup, Max starts talking to Chelsea a lot about his feelings since she is Stephanie's best friend. They start spending a lot of time together and talking a lot more than normal. Both make it very clear that they are just friends, although there are signs of attraction everywhere. On New Year's Eve, Max is Chelsea's date to the big party at Chez Rouge. At midnight, they share a kiss and Chelsea runs away embarrassed, but they get back together shortly after.

Chelsea leaves for London to help her mom recover after an accident. She is gone for a while and on June 7, 2009, Chelsea returns to Salem to inform everybody that Billie is doing better. She asks Max to move to London with her and he accepts. The Bradys later hear that Chelsea and Max are planning to tie the knot. The two lovebirds soon flee to London together to assist Billie in her job.

On March 15, 2010, Max returns to Salem for a few hours on his way to a medical convention in San Diego, where he first surprises Caroline. She tells him what has been going on with Melanie. He then goes to visit Melanie at the hospital, where he tries to convince her to give Carly Manning — her biological mother — a chance. Melanie states that although Trent is not really her father, and that Daniel Jonas is, the two will always be brother and sister no matter what.

In September 2023, it was revealed at the funeral of Chelsea's grandfather, Victor Kiriakis, that Max and Chelsea have become parents to a baby boy, they have named Issac, after his late uncle, Zack Brady.

== Reception ==
In 2023, Amanda Lynne from The List wrote that Max might be "a bit of a mystery to fans". Lynne also reported on how fans "wondered" for many years where Max and Frankie were following their departure, and also that long-time viewers were surprised when Max returned in 2005. Lynne called the initial relationship between Max and Chelsea "rocky" and wrote that despite his exit, Max "continues to be an important member of the Brady family, and viewers would likely be open to seeing Max return to the show in the future".
