= Kayla Brady =

Kayla Brady Johnson
- Days of Our Lives character
- Mary Beth Evans as Kayla Brady
- Portrayed by: Catherine Mary Stewart (1982–1983); Mary Beth Evans (1986–present); Rhonda Aldrich (1989)
- Duration: 1982–1983; 1986–1992; 2006–present
- First appearance: January 18, 1982
- Created by: Pat Falken Smith
- Introduced by: Betty Corday and Al Rabin
- Spin-off appearances: Days of Our Lives: Beyond Salem (2022)
In-universe information
- Other names: Kayla Deveraux; Kayla Johnson; Kayla Caroline Brady
- Occupation: Doctor
- Family: Brady
- Parents: Shawn Brady; Caroline Brady
- Brothers: Roman Brady; Frankie Brady (adoptive); Max Brady (adoptive)
- Sisters: Kimberly Brady
- Half-brothers: Bo Brady
- Spouse: Jack Deveraux (1987–1988); Steve Johnson (1988–1989, 1990–2012, 2017–2020, 2021–present)
- Sons: Joey Johnson
- Daughters: Stephanie Johnson
- Stepsons: Tripp Dalton
- Grandfathers: Peter Brady
- Uncles: Eric Brady
- Aunts: Colleen Brady; Molly Brady
- Nephews: Eric Brady; Rex Brady; Andrew Donovan; Shawn-Douglas Brady; Zack Brady; Isaac Brady (adoptive)
- Nieces: Carrie Brady; Sami Brady; Cassie Brady; Theresa Donovan; Chelsea Brady; Ciara Brady
- First cousins: Ryan Brady; Colin Murphy

Kayla Brady Johnson is a fictional character from Days of Our Lives, a soap opera on the NBC network. She made her first appearance in 1982. Kayla was created by Pat Falken Smith as one of the original members of the Brady family. She is known for her popular pairing with Steve Johnson. This relationship gave the couple the title of a famous super couple. Kayla was described as being the "good" girl of the serial. During her time on Days of our Lives, Kayla was extremely well received by television critics. Kayla Brady Johnson is one of the six Brady children. She is the daughter of the late Shawn Brady and Caroline Brady. She is the sister of Roman and Kimberly Brady, the half-sister of Bo Brady, and the sister of adopted brothers Frankie and Max Brady. She has been married five times, once to Jack Deveraux and four times to Steve Johnson. Steve and Kayla have two children, a daughter, Stephanie, and a son, Joey. After being written out of the soap in 2009, Mary Beth Evans returned to Days of Our Lives for a short-stint on June 18, 2010, and then again on recurring status starting in December 2011. She was upgraded to regular status in 2015.

== Casting ==
The role was originated on January 18, 1982, by actress Catherine Mary Stewart who played the role until December 14, 1983. The role was recast in 1986, with actress Mary Beth Evans taking on the role. Evans is most recognizable in the role as Kayla. She played the role from May 23, 1986, to May 26, 1992. Evans returned to play Kayla on June 12, 2006. She announced her departure from the soap on February 17, 2009. Evans said that she was not surprised that she and Nichols were written out but expressed disappointment, telling Digital Spy, "I thought that Stephen and I brought value to the show and I certainly know there was a fan base. I thought we brought things to the canvas that other people didn't but it just didn't seem to matter."

Evans returned to play Kayla in a recurring capacity from June 18 to 29, 2010 and September 23, 2010 to February 15, 2011. In December 2011, Evans began appearing on a regular basis in a recurring capacity. In May 2015, Evans announced she had been put back on contract with Days of Our Lives.

== Storylines ==
=== 1982–83, 1986–92 ===
Kayla is first introduced to the show in 1982 as Roman Brady's younger sister and a nurse who works at University Hospital. Kayla shares a past relationship with Mike Horton, and also dates David Banning. She is involved with Chris Kositchek and loses her virginity to him. Kayla leaves in 1983 when Chris cannot commit to her.

Kayla returns to Salem in 1986 with Mary Beth Evans in the role after Steve Johnson is hired to scare her away from Cleveland. Accepting a job offer from Tom Horton, Kayla establishes a low income clinic on the riverfront and continues to cross paths with Steve. The two help orphans Max and Frankie find a home with Kayla's parents, and later go on the run together when Steve's former paramour Britta Englund is killed. When Orpheus kidnaps Marlena, the "Three Knives" tattoos shared by Steve, Bo, and Britta, become an important clue in the story, with Steve and Kayla traveling to Stockholm to help Roman unravel the mystery.

In 1987, Kayla helps Adrienne Johnson find work at the Emergency Center, not knowing she is actually Steve's long lost sister. Steve and Kayla are torn apart when Steve tries to take the fall for a traumatized Adrienne's killing of their abusive father, Duke, but her memories of the incident return before he could be sentenced.

Later in the year, Kayla goes on the run with Steve when he is framed for the shooting of Senator Harper Deveraux. After returning to Salem, Steve and Kayla finally make love for the first time. After Steve is cleared, Harper hires Kayla to be his son Jack's nurse. An old friend of Kayla's, Jack falls in love with her. Steve knows how happy Kayla makes a dying Jack, who is secretly another sibling whom Jo Johnson had placed up for adoption. Devastated by Steve's rejection, Kayla marries Jack in the hopes it would help his health. Led to believe that Kayla knows the secret of Jack's past, Harper begins poisoning her. Steve rescues her when she is near death. Though the two are reunited, they agree not to tell Jack until after his election to the town council. However, Jack discovers the affair the night of the election and rapes Kayla in a fit of rage. Kayla charges Jack with rape, but thanks to a plea deal, Jack receives only a slap on the wrist, even after Kayla confronts him on the stand.

Kayla loses her hearing during an attack at the loft, and cannot remember her attacker's face. Steve learns sign language to communicate with her, and Kim works with her to help her memory. During this period, Jack finally grants her the divorce, but Kayla isn't sure if she can marry Steve without her hearing. Kayla finally remembers Harper was the man who attacked her, just before being taken hostage by him at the loft. After that experience, Kayla undergoes a risky surgery to restore her hearing and agrees to marry Steve.

After their marriage, Steve and Kayla almost adopt a young deaf boy named Benji, who is eventually found to be Stefano DiMera's son. Later, Steve helps Nick Corelli hide from the police. Nick gifts Steve and Kayla with a mansion for their trouble. In an old trunk in the mansion's attic, Steve and Kayla find an old civil war diary and spend time reliving the love story of Emily and Gideon. Later, while helping Marcus search for his own past in Charleston, SC, they visit significant sites in the diary. Marcus' search for his past leads to an involvement with a corrupt preacher. Steve agrees to undergo plastic surgery to fix his eye, in order to infiltrate the preacher's camp for the ISA as Daniel Lucas.

After the ISA operation ends with the appearance of Shane's death, life is upended for Steve and Kayla yet again when Marina Toscano appears, claiming to be Steve's presumed dead first wife. Knowing she is pregnant but not yet having told Steve, Kayla encourages Steve to help Marina, in hopes the old entanglements can be resolved. Marina and Steve travel to Italy to retrieve the key, where Kayla catches them in an apparently compromising situation. Steve's eye socket is damaged again in a fight, and he decides to start wearing the patch again. Back in Salem, Steve works to regain Kayla's trust, and is shocked to learn from Jack she is pregnant. Kayla and Marina argue in her hotel room, where Marina is later found dead.

Kayla is kidnapped by Victor Kiriakis, and released in exchange for the key. Steve and Kayla plan another wedding, as their marriage had been invalidated by the reappearance of Marina, but Kayla is arrested during the ceremony for her murder. Kayla gives birth to Stephanie Johnson after going into labor on the witness stand. Convicted of murder, Kayla is sent to prison. At first she tries to keep Stephanie with her, but then decides prison was no place for a baby. Sheila the nanny, who had become obsessed with the baby, kidnaps Stephanie and takes her to Australia. Upon hearing of Stephanie's kidnapping, Kayla escapes from prison, and she and Steve follow Sheila to Australia where they manage to get their baby back. After word came that Kayla had been cleared of Marina's murder, they return to Salem, where they are finally legally married.

In the fall of 1990, Steve decides to become a police officer. He is injured in a boat explosion, rigged by Lawrence Alamain and meant for Bo. Steve begins to recover, but is "killed" when Lawrence has his IV poisoned. Kayla moves in with Shane Donovan for protection, and the two eventually begin a relationship. Things become complicated when Kim returns to town in 1991 to find her sister and ex-husband living together, and circumstances lead her to become involved with Lawrence Alamain.

Shane is paralyzed in the line of duty. At first he refuses to have the surgery to regain the use of his legs, but Kayla helps him recover as their relationship deepens. However, Kayla decides to move to Los Angeles in the spring of 1992 to start a new life for her and her daughter.

=== 2006— ===
In 2006, Kayla, now a doctor, returns to Salem for Frankie and Jennifer's wedding, having completed medical school in Los Angeles. She had been planning to go to Africa with Doctors Without Borders, but is shocked when Steve appears at the church. He doesn't remember his past, and she is devastated to think he doesn't know who she is and to watch him take up with Billie Reed. A series of events, including their daughter's race car crash and a stay in quarantine after being exposed to a toxin at the hospital, help slowly bring them back together. Eventually, a trip to a cabin where they once hid out together on the run sparks Steve's memory to return in its entirety, and the two are reunited.

In 2007, Benji DiMera (who's forced by EJ) returns to Salem with a tarot card that turns Steve into a DiMera soldier. It turns out Stefano and EJ had tortured him during his missing years. Due to Steve's programming, Kayla is forced into removing John Black's kidney so an ailing Stefano can have it. Steve is committed to the mental hospital, and Kayla works to help him recover, despite his resistance. When his programming is again activated by EJ in order to have him kill Bo on Tinda Lau, Kayla is finally able to break through to him, and they spend some time on the island recovering.

Back in Salem, Steve and Kayla begin to discuss the idea of having another baby. When Philip Kiriakis' son Tyler is abandoned anonymously at the hospital by Philip and Mimi's surrogate, Kayla and Steve take him in and care for him as Pocket. After Steve takes Stefano hostage in retaliation for Benji's murder when the vendetta heats up, social services take Pocket away when he becomes ill. Steve and Kayla are accused of poisoning him by Philip, but it turns out to be a rare genetic disorder. Steve and Kayla and Philip all decide it was in his best interest to go live with another foster family.

In 2008, Kayla and Steve support Stephanie after it is revealed she was raped by Ford Decker. They travel to Ireland to help Shawn meet with the sister he had thought was dead. While there, Kayla learns she is pregnant. Kayla and Steve are both caught in the plane crash on the way back to Salem, which kills her father Shawn Brady and is later found to be the work of a deranged Ava Vitali. Kayla aids Daniel and Lexie in treating Bo's pancreas condition. Under all these stresses, she begins to have problems with her pregnancy, which leads Steve to keep the information about his ex-girlfriend Ava from her. Ava mistakenly kidnaps Hope thinking she is Kayla, but Steve, Kayla, and Bo soon follow to rescue Hope. Kayla discovers the pills Ava had been taking kept Ava from ever becoming sane. Afterward, Ava leaves Steve and Kayla alone, though she fled the country rather than pay for her crimes.

Stressed, and with an already troubled pregnancy, Kayla goes into premature labor. Joseph Johnson is delivered at 26 weeks. After stabilizing, he is briefly kidnapped in the late summer of 2008 by Stefano DiMera. In early 2009, Kayla is accidentally shot by Hope at University Hospital, a situation Bo has foreseen in his psychic visions. Though the bullet penetrates the sac around the heart, Kayla recovers after surgery. Offscreen, Kayla and Steve decide to leave Salem to run a clinic in a remote part of the world. They take their infant son with them, and relay their decision and details of their situation to their daughter Stephanie in a letter, in April 2009.

In June 2010, Kayla briefly returns along with several other Brady and Horton family members to pay respects to Alice Horton after she took ill. Kayla returned once again in December 2011 to assist Caroline in running the Brady Pub. She further confesses she and Steve were experiencing issues, and he was back in the ISA. She confessed that while he was the man she loved, he was not the man she wanted to be with.

== Cultural impact and reception ==
In the mid 1980s, the baby name "Kayla" jumped from the roughly 900th most popular girl's name, to around the top 10, where it has remained ever since. This is widely attributed to Kayla Brady's arrival on the show, with which it coincides.

In 2020, Charlie Mason from Soaps She Knows placed Kayla at #30 on their list of the 35 most memorable characters from Days of Our Lives, saying that "See that butter-would’t-melt-in-my-mouth expression Mary Beth Evans’ Salem sweetheart is wearing here? She's the rare individual who can get away with it because — and this has been scientifically tested — butter really wouldn't melt in her mouth."
