= Isabella Toscano =

- Days of our Lives character
- Portrayed by: Staci Greason
- Duration: 1989–92, 1995, 2000, 2002–03, 2010
- First appearance: October 16, 1989
- Last appearance: November 19, 2010
- Created by: Anne Howard Bailey
- Introduced by: Ken Corday and Shelley Curtis
- Spin-off appearances: Days of Our Lives: One Stormy Night (1992)
In-universe information
- Other names: Isabella Beatrice Toscano; Isabella Black; Izzy-Bee (John's nickname for her)
- Occupation: Private investigator
- Family: Kiriakis
- Father: Victor Kiriakis
- Mother: Loretta Toscano
- Stepfather: Ernesto Toscano
- Stepmother: Carly Manning
- Half-brothers: Bo Brady; Xander Kiriakis; Philip Kiriakis
- Half-sisters: Marina Toscano
- Spouse: John Black (1992)
- Sons: Brady Black
- Grandsons: Tate Black
- Granddaughters: Rachel Black
- Grandfathers: Yurgos Kiriakis
- Grandmothers: Sophie Kiriakis
- Uncles: Alexander Kiriakis; Titus Kiriakis; Deimos Kiriakis
- Nephews: Shawn-Douglas Brady; Zack Brady; Tyler Kiriakis
- Nieces: Chelsea Brady; Ciara Brady; Victoria Kiriakis
- First cousins: Justin Kiriakis

Isabella Toscano is a fictional character from the NBC soap opera Days of Our Lives. The character first appeared on a recurring basis on October 16, 1989, and was portrayed by actress Staci Greason. Greason was put on contract in December 1989. Greason left the show in October 1992, after Isabella died from pancreatic cancer. Greason reappeared as Isabella's ghost in 1995, 2000, 2002, 2003, and most recently in November 2010.

== Storylines ==
Isabella was born on July 27, 1960, to Loretta Toscano and Ernesto Toscano. She had an older sister, Marina Theresa Toscano. In 1989, Isabella was introduced as an inmate at an asylum. Isabella's sister, Marina (Hunter Tylo) was keeping her locked up against her will. She escaped with the help of Jack Deveraux and she hid in his loft. Together, Jack and Isabella discovered the Toscano family treasure and her mother, Loretta's diary—which Marina had been looking for.

When Marina's dead body was discovered, Steve's wife, Kayla Brady was convicted in her murder. Unwilling to believe Kayla was guilty, Isabella teamed up with Kayla's brother, Roman Brady. In a surprising turn of events, Isabella and Roman discovered Isabella killed Marina, then blocked the deed from her memory. With this new evidence, Kayla was released and Isabella cleared on the grounds of self-defense.

In the summer of 1990, Isabella became a key figure in the infamous Cruise of Deception storyline when Ernesto Toscano, also seeking his late wife Loretta's diary, invited Salem's most prominent members aboard his yacht. Jack returned some of the diary's pages he had stole. Isabella discovered her biological father was not Ernesto but Victor Kiriakis. A furious Ernesto then kidnapped Isabella, taking her to a nearby island. Just before Ernesto succeeded in poisoning Isabella as he had her mother after he discovered Loretta's affair with Victor, Roman rescued Isabella. In the mayhem, Ernesto and Hope Brady were killed.

Returning to Salem, Isabella began a private investigation agency with her new-found brother, Bo Brady, and her relationship with Roman deepened. The couple become engaged and made plans to move in together when Roman's presumed-dead wife, Marlena, returned to Salem. A devastated Isabella assured Roman she would not stand in the way of rebuilding his marriage with Marlena. However, she began to truly despair when she discovered she was pregnant with Roman's baby.

Things came to a head when Roman and Marlena were confronted by a man claiming to be the "real" Roman Brady. Roman's mother, Caroline Brady, confirmed the latter's claim. Salemites were stunned to learn the man that they called Roman for six years was an impostor. Devastated, the false Roman reverted to using his old name, John Black, and began a desperate search into his real identity. He also reunited with Isabella after she told him she was having their child. On May 19, 1992, during the couple's marriage ceremony, Isabella went into labor; she quickly gave birth to Brady Victor Black and named him in honor of the Brady family and Isabella's father.

The Black family's happiness was short-lived when Dr. Carly Manning informed Isabella her back pain was the result of advanced pancreatic cancer. Telling John she wanted to die in her "real" home, John and Isabella went to Venice where she quietly died in John's arms on October 16, 1992.

In 1993, Marlena and Roman Brady named their newborn daughter Isabella, nicknamed Belle for short. In a not-unusual daytime plot twist, Marlena discovered that John was the father of Belle, not Roman. Isabella's ghost made several guest appearances: in 1995, as part of Satan's plot, and in 2000, while attempting to save Eric Brady. Later that year, Isabella appeared to John as her former husband prayed for guidance, unsure as how he could best help their angry, now college-age son, Brady. In 2002 and 2003, a ghostly Isabella again appeared to a now calmer Brady, who was struggling with his feelings for Chloe Lane. She also appeared to Brady on several occasions in 2010 while Brady had Vivian Alamain buried alive inside a sarcophagus. Brady and Kristen DiMera later name their ddaughter Rachel Isabella DiMera Black, named after their mothers.
