= Xander Kiriakis =

Fictional character from Days of Our Lives

- Days of Our Lives character
- Portrayed by: Paul Telfer
- Duration: 2015–present
- First appearance: March 24, 2015
- Created by: Gary Tomlin and Christopher Whitesell
- Introduced by: Ken Corday, Lisa de Cazotte and Greg Meng
- Spin-off appearances: Days of Our Lives: A Very Salem Christmas (2021)
In-universe information
- Other names: Alexander Kiriakis; Alexandros Kiriakis; Xander Cook
- Occupation: Executive at Titan Industries; Diamond smuggler Owner of Randall Lewis' Pharmacy Company
- Father: Victor Kiriakis
- Mother: Fiona Cook
- Stepfather: Titus Kiriakis
- Half-brothers: Bo Brady; Philip Kiriakis
- Half-sisters: Isabella Toscano
- Spouse: Nicole Walker (2018–2019); Chanel Dupree (2021); Sarah Horton (2022–2023, 2024–2026)
- Daughters: Victoria Kiriakis
- Grandparents: Yurgos Kiriakis; Sophie Kiriakis
- Uncles: Titus Kiriakis; Alexander Kiriakis; Deimos Kiriakis
- Aunts: Maisie Cook (maternal)
- Nieces and nephews: Brady Black; Shawn-Douglas Brady; Chelsea Brady; Zack Brady; Ciara Brady; Tyler Kiriakis
- First cousins: Justin Kiriakis
- Other relatives: Alex Kiriakis; Victor Kiriakis II (adoptive); Joey Kiriakis (adoptive); Sonny Kiriakis; Claire Brady; Tate Black; Rachel Black; Isaac Brady; Bo Brady-Weston; Addie Weston

Xander Kiriakis is a fictional character from Days of Our Lives, an American soap opera on Peacock. The character, created by Gary Tomlin and Christopher Whitesell, is portrayed by Paul Telfer.

Introduced in 2015 as the nephew of tycoon Victor Kiriakis who grew up in Scotland with his mother Fiona, Xander is a member of the Kiriakis family. Telfer's performance has been met with critical acclaim, having garnered him a Daytime Emmy Award nomination for Outstanding Supporting Actor in a Drama Series in 2020.

== Casting ==
In 2015, Paul Telfer joined the cast of Days of Our Lives as Xander Cook, the nephew of Victor Kiriakis. He made his first on screen appearance on March 24, 2015. Before debuting as Xander, he played Victor's henchman, Damon for six episodes, and was hired to be a potential one-week stand-in for James Scott, who played EJ DiMera.

In April 2019, it was revealed Telfer would return as Xander in a regular capacity; he returned during the final moments of the April 29 episode.

== Storylines ==
Xander first showed up in Salem in March 2015. As the head of an international blood diamond smuggling ring, he compelled his friend and lover, Serena Mason through threats, to steal the diamonds from the elephant statue that she and Eric Brady bought from Africa few years ago. Xander met with his uncle Victor Kiriakis where it was revealed that he has been doing criminal operations for him in Cyprus and Cuba in addition to money laundering for the Kiriakis family. As a cover for his criminal activities, Xander owns a European pharmaceutical company that supplies various charities around the world.

He met Nicole Walker and fell for her right away, she pretended to show interest in him and used Xander to make her ex-boyfriend Daniel Jonas jealous then started dating Daniel again and wanted nothing to do with Xander. Nicole also uncovered Xander's history with Serena and Eric, including his criminal records. Xander continued pursuing Nicole even after being warned by Victor not to.

At Titan, Xander tracked down Nicole for betraying him, locking her up to die in the furnace room along with her lover Eric, who came to save her. He and his female accomplice destroyed all the evidence before leaving. As Xander was preparing to abscond, he was kidnapped by Victor's henchmen on Victor's order for not following the orders and putting their business in jeopardy by bringing their criminal activities to attention. Xander explained his devotion and was let go, but only to be stripped of his privileges and wealthy lifestyle. He worked as a gardener at the Kiriakis mansion briefly as part of the punishment where he was seduced by Theresa Donovan who falsely accused him of rape when Brady walked in on them. Xander was arrested by the police on charges of attempted rape and assault.

In September 2016, Xander was seen serving his time in prison with Clyde Weston and Orpheus. Xander wanted revenge on Theresa and Nicole. As the trio are being transported with other prisoners, the three escape, and Xander heads straight for Theresa's to confront her about her false accusations. Theresa apologized but blamed Victor. He started to strangle Theresa but escaped when Brady showed up. Xander, Clyde, and Orpheus regrouped at a shack on the pier. The trio went to Johnson's house and held Kayla Brady and Joey Johnson hostage. Steve Johnson comes home and gets shot. The three criminals parted ways, Xander found Nicole at Daniel's grave and held her at gunpoint.

In April 2017, Xander followed Nicole and Brady to Canada, ultimately shooting Brady and kidnapping both Nicole and Holly. By 2018, Xander was in Mexico selling blood diamonds to drug lord Mateo, who was holding his ex-girlfriend Theresa hostage. Xander assisted Theresa in escaping and returning to Salem under the condition that she would help him return to the good graces of Victor. Xander's return to Salem was short-lived when he ultimately leaves town. Months later, in October, Xander blackmailed Nicole into marrying him using a recording of her confession to killing Deimos. Nicole and Xander live with her daughter Holly in Chicago at Sarah Horton (Linsey Godfrey)'s apartment. A fire breaks out at the secret facility in Nashville where Xander is working with Kristen DiMera and Dr. Rolf on experiments that bring the dead back to life. Xander is presumed dead.

He returned to Salem in January 2019, working with Eve Donovan to bring Jack Deveraux back in Salem in return for the thumb drive. Xander shows his uncle Victor the flash drive containing secret internal documents that could ruin DiMera Enterprises, Titan's largest business rival, in return for him being the new CEO of Titan. Victor offers him money, which he turns down, demanding power and respect instead. Xander finds Sarah Horton in the Kiriakis mansion conversing with Sonny Kiriakis and interrupts them by eating Sarah's muffin and flirts with her, she turns down his hard pass and goes to meet her friend. Eric attacks Xander after learning that he's alive. Eli Grant shows up and arrests Xander for shooting Marlena Evans but is released after the security footage is revealed to have been deleted by himself who had impersonated John Black. He finds Sarah Horton drinking heavily heartbroken over her previous relationship with Rex Brady and being rejected by Eric. Xander and Sarah have sex. Afterwards, he blackmails Eve Donovan after stealing Dr Wolf's diary from her. He returns again in April after abducting Nicole's daughter Holly, per the instruction of Ted Laurent (Gilles Marini). He accepts an executive position job at Titan Industries, which Brady offers him in return that he hands over the recording and divorces Nicole. It is later revealed that he and Nicole are secretly working together and that Nicole is actually Kristen, wearing Nicole's mask. He bonds well with Maggie Horton after he catches her drinking and opens up to her about the pain he went through as a kid when losing his parents, he stays with her until they both fall asleep on the sofa. He hands over Dr. Rolf's diary to Maggie in Sarah's presence to save Will's life. He then holds Ted Laurent hostage upon Kristen's orders and later on confesses the truth about Holly being alive to Eric, Sarah, and Maggie. In 2019, after helping Sarah give birth to her child at the scene of a car accident, he and Victor witnessed baby Micky die shortly after in the hospital from injuries sustained in the accident. At Victor's request, he orchestrates a switch for Sarah's baby with Brady's daughter with Kristen DiMera (Stacy Haiduk). In early 2020, Xander asks Sarah to marry him. Just before the wedding, she finds out the truth about Xander's lies and dumps him. He saves Maggie's life when she tries to commit suicide in prison and reveals the truth to her about Orpheus being the one who caused the accident (versus Maggie). Later, upon Brady's insistence, Victor fires Xander, leaving him jobless. Xander eventually regains Sarah's love and is re-given the Titan CEO job by Victor. That same day, Phillip, Victor's estranged son, arrives and demands the CEO job to restore the father/son relationship.

In the fall of 2023, it was revealed that Victor's long lost son is actually Xander, who was raised by his uncle Titus and his wife as his son and Victor's will was tampered by Brady's ex-wife, Theresa Donovan and his longtime friend and rival, Konstantin Meleounis (John Kapelos), who is bitter, because Victor left him out of the will.

== Reception ==
In 2020, Candace Young from Soaps She Knows put Xander on her list of the hottest soap opera villains, writing that "Xander has done some seriously heinous things, but falling in love took some of the edge off. Now he's firmly in the bad boy with a heart category. With an alter-ego named El Erotico and a chest and six-pack to die for, it was no wonder Sarah climbed into his lap and took him to bed."
