= Paul Telfer (actor) =

Scottish actor

- Born: Paisley, Renfrewshire, Scotland
- Occupation: Actor
- Years active: 2002–present
- Spouse: Carmen Cusack (m. 2012)

Paul Telfer is a Scottish actor. He plays Xander Kiriakis on the NBC/Peacock soap opera Days of Our Lives, for which he won the 2025 Daytime Emmy Award for Outstanding Lead Actor in a Drama Series.

== Career ==
He appeared in the titular role of the 2005 TV miniseries Hercules. In 2007, Telfer appeared in five episodes of the second series of the BBC drama Hotel Babylon (as Luke), and in three episodes of the TV series NCIS,, as Marine Corporal Damon Werth: "Corporal Punishment", "Outlaws and In-laws" and "Jack Knife." He also played Alexander in The Vampire Diaries as one of the original five vampire hunters, in Season 4 of the show (which aired in 2012). this role was a guest appearance.

In January 2015, Telfer was cast on Days of Our Lives as Damon, a hitman hired by Victor Kiriakis; soon after, he was cast in the role of Xander Kiriakis. In April 2019, it was revealed that Paul had returned to the show, signing contract. In late 2019, he guest starred in an episode of Agents of S.H.I.E.L.D. as Viro.

== Personal life ==
Telfer graduated with First Class honours in Film Studies. He is married to Broadway actress Carmen Cusack.

== Filmography ==
List of film performances
Year	Title	Role	Notes
2008	Miss Conception	Luca	
2010	Young Alexander the Great	Hephaestion	
2011	Son of Morning	Glenn	
2018	California No	Jacko	
2019	The Thin Line	Tone Jimenez	Post-production
2019	Star Trek First Frontier	Commander McCain	Post-production
2019	Green Rush	Ticker	Post-production
2021	Days of Our Lives: A Very Salem Christmas	Xander Kiriakis	Peacock Original Movie

List of television performances
Year	Title	Role	Notes
2002	Is Harry on the Boat?	Matt	Episode 1.03
2004	Spartacus	Gannicus	
2004	Mile High	Rory	Episode 1.01
2005	Hercules	Hercules	
2007	Hotel Babylon	Luke	5 episodes
2007–2010	NCIS	Damon Werth	3 episodes
2012–2013	The Vampire Diaries	Alexander	3 episodes
2012	Co-op of the Damned	Zombie Bill	Episode: "Braaaaiinnsss..."
2013	Body of Proof	Tanner Brennan	Episode: "Dark City"
2014	CSI: Crime Scene Investigation	Lex	Episode: "Love for Sale"
2014	Cosmos: A Space-Time Odyssey	Angry Scholar #2	Episode: "Standing Up in the Milky Way"
2015	Days of Our Lives	Damon	6 episodes
2015–present	Days of Our Lives	Xander Kiriakis	Regular role
2015	Once Upon a Time	Lord Macintosh	Episode: "The Bear and the Bow"; Episode: "The Bear King"
2019	Agents of S.H.I.E.L.D.	Viro	Episode: "Window of Opportunity"

Video Games
Year	Title	Role	Notes
2014	Call of Duty: Advanced Warfare	Will Irons	Voice and likeness
2014	Sunset Overdrive		Voice

== Awards and nominations ==
List of acting awards and nominations
Year	Award	Category	Nominated work	Result	Ref.
2020	Daytime Emmy Award	Outstanding Supporting Actor in a Drama Series	Days of Our Lives	Nominated	
2025	Daytime Emmy Award	Outstanding Lead Actor in a Drama Series	Days of Our Lives	Won	
