= Santo DiMera =

- Days of Our Lives character
- Portrayed by: James Scott (2007–2008); Fabrizio Brienza (2012)
- Duration: 2007–2008, 2012
- First appearance: July 9, 2007
- Last appearance: May 8, 2012
- Created by: Hogan Sheffer
In-universe information
- Occupation: Salesman businessman
- Family: DiMera
- Father: Gino DiMera
- Brothers: 6 unnamed brothers
- Wife: Signora DiMera
- Sons: 6 unnamed sons Stefano DiMera; Ryan Brady
- Grandsons: André DiMera; Peter Blake (adoptive); Benjy Hawk; EJ DiMera; Chad DiMera; Stefan DiMera; Jake Lambert; Tony DiMera (legal)
- Granddaughters: Kristen DiMera (adoptive); Renée DuMonde; Megan Hathaway; Lexie Carver
- Other relatives: Steven Hawk; Dimitri Von Leuschner; Johnny DiMera; Sydney DiMera; Thomas DiMera; Theo Carver; Charlotte DiMera; Rachel Black (adoptive)

Santo DiMera is a fictional character on the soap opera Days of Our Lives. He was portrayed by James Scott from July 9, 2007 to September 28, 2007. Scott reprised the role on August 20, 2008, as a figment of John's imagination. The titular character was the father of Stefano DiMera and established the wealth and power of the DiMera family.

== Storylines ==
The character Santo is a traveling salesman and the father of crime lord Stefano DiMera. Victor Kiriakis described Santo as "brilliant, wealthy, charming and utterly crooked" with "operations all over the world". While doing business in Galway, Ireland, he became involved with a novice nun, Colleen Brady. Even though he was married and had a son at their first meeting, he is drawn to Colleen and chooses to pursue her. Santo and Colleen share letters and begin a relationship after Santo's wife allegedly dies. Their relationship is the reason the DiMeras start the Brady–DiMera feud.

According to Stefano, Colleen dies horribly by leaping to her death from a cliff overlooking the ocean (foreshadowing similar future scenes involving members of her family), and Santo blames the Bradys, but it is a simple truth that drove Colleen to her death. Santo's wife never died and Colleen, who had been intimate with Santo, was about to marry him when she learns the truth through her younger brother Shawn Brady, who was inadvertently tipped off by a young Stefano while they were playing together. Santo vows revenge against the Bradys for losing whom he now considers the love of his life, and a vendetta begins. Though occurring (off-screen) through occasional commentary from other Brady family members, viewers learn that the feud is particularly painful, vicious, and occasionally violent. In later years, Shawn goes to great lengths—including having his step-son Bo roughed up and briefly held captive in Ireland—to keep the feud's origins a secret.

Years later, in a letter written to Stefano in Rome from his deathbed in New Orleans, Santo tells him the Bradys are living in the American city of Salem and orders his son to come to America and continue the family vendetta, a move that proves beneficial to DiMera Enterprises. The governor of the unnamed state in which Salem is located, who happened to be the father of Stefano's ex-daughter-in-law Liz Chandler, had been bragging that, at the time, Salem had been free of the scourge of organized crime, which gave the DiMeras a "clean slate" from which to operate.

Stefano dutifully picks up Santo's mantle, and uses it to his own advantage, carrying out the vendetta and amassing great wealth in the process. Various letters among DiMera family members reveal that the key to ending the vendetta is contained in a portfolio that was left in Colleen's church in Galway, St. Malachy's. The sole condition to the vendetta's end is that his grandson EJ DiMera and Sami Brady must be married because EJ and Sami are identical lookalikes to Colleen and Santo, and therefore acceptable proxies to whom Santo considers soulmates.

In February 2008, Colleen is found alive and it is revealed she left Santo, faked her death, and went into hiding in a convent in South America where she had his son, Ryan Brady – then believed to be John Black – and gave him up for adoption. In August 2008, Santo appears as a vision to John, telling him not to let what Stefano did to him alienate him from the people he loves.

In the summer of 2012, the DiMera family begins to fall apart as Stefano's wife Kate Roberts has an affair with Ian McAllister, Stefano reveals that he isn't EJ's real father and disinherits him, and Lexie Carver dies from a brain tumor which is an after effect of André DiMera holding her captive in a tunnel years prior. In June 2012, Stefano appears to have been murdered, and EJ is arrested for the crime. After he is released, EJ is kidnapped by Ian, who reveals that Stefano is alive and the man who died was a lookalike. Ian's mother, Yvette, was an employee and lover of Santo's. Santo was also Ian's father figure. According to Ian, Santo intended for Yvette to inherit half of his fortune, and Ian arrived to collect the money on Santo’s behalf. Ian also reveals that he wanted to take everything away from Stefano and forged the letter from Alice Horton to Stefano saying that EJ wasn't Stefano's son when he was. EJ punches Ian, causing him to lose consciousness, and calls the police, who subsequently haul Ian off to a mental institution.

It is later revealed that John’s identity was not that of Ryan Brady’s. John was a baby at the orphanage where Ryan was born, with the latter dying shortly after birth. With the caretakers at the orphanage being unwilling to break the bad news to Colleen, they replaced Ryan with John. Colleen raised John as her own until she was no longer able to, and he was adopted by Leopold and Philomena Alamain. Philomena was the sister of Daphne DiMera, Stefano's future common-law wife and biological mother of Leopold and Philomena's other son, Lawrence Alamain. John's parents were eventually revealed to be Maude and Tim Robicheaux (a.k.a. Yo Ling).
