= Joey Johnson (Days of Our Lives) =

Fictional character

- Days of Our Lives character
- Tanner Stine as Joey Johnson
- Portrayed by: Brody and Jonas (2008–2009); Jadon Wells (2012–2014); James Lastovic (2015–2020); Tanner Stine (2022–2023)
- Duration: 2008–2009; 2012–2017; 2020; 2022–2023
- First appearance: May 16, 2008
- Last appearance: March 1, 2023
- Created by: Hogan Sheffer and Meg Kelly
- Introduced by: Ken Corday and Edward J. Scott (2008); Corday, Lisa de Cazotte and Greg Meng (2012); Corday, Meng and Albert Alarr (2015); Corday and Alarr (2020)
- Spin-off appearances: Days of Our Lives: Beyond Salem (2022)
- James Lastovic as Joey Johnson
In-universe information
- Occupation: Student; Waiter
- Family: Johnson; Brady
- Parents: Steve Johnson; Kayla Brady
- Sisters: Stephanie Johnson
- Half-brothers: Tripp Dalton
- Grandparents: Duke Johnson; Jo Johnson; Shawn Brady; Caroline Brady
- Aunts and uncles: Jack Deveraux; Adrienne Johnson; Roman Brady; Bo Brady; Kimberly Brady; Frankie Brady (adoptive); Max Brady (adoptive)
- First cousins: Carrie Brady; Sami Brady; Eric Brady; Rex Brady; Cassie Brady; Andrew Donovan IV; Theresa Donovan; Gwen Rizczech; Abigail Deveraux; JJ Deveraux; Joey Kiriakis (adoptive); Victor Kiriakis II (adoptive); Sonny Kiriakis; Shawn-Douglas Brady; Chelsea Brady; Zack Brady; Ciara Brady

Joey Johnson is a fictional character from Days of Our Lives, an American soap opera aired on the NBC network, presently portrayed by Tanner Stine. Introduced in 2008, Joey was created by head writers Hogan Sheffer and Meg Kelly as the youngest child of supercouple, Steve "Patch" Johnson and Kayla Brady (Stephen Nichols and Mary Beth Evans). The role was played by siblings Brody and Jonas until the character was written out in 2009. Child actor Jadon Wells appeared in the role of Joey on a recurring basis from 2012 to 2014. In 2015, the character was rapidly aged to 16 when James Lastovic was cast in to play the role. Joey returns having skipped out on boarding school suffering from abandonment issues. It is later revealed that Joey had secretly been conspiring with Ava Vitali (Tamara Braun) to orchestrate Patch and Kayla's reunion. Unbeknownst to Joey, Ava is his father's ex-lover and Ava has caused quite a bit of trouble for Kayla and the rest of the Brady family.

== Storylines ==
=== 2008–2014 ===
In February 2008, the Brady family travels to Ireland to reunite patriarch Shawn Brady (Frank Parker) with his dying sister Colleen Brady (Shirley Jones). During their trip, Kayla and Steve learn she is pregnant. On their way back to Salem, the family is involved in a plane crash that kills Shawn. It is later revealed that, Steve's deranged ex-lover Ava Vitali (Tamara Braun) is responsible for the accident. Meanwhile, Kayla is trying to save her brother Bo's life (Peter Reckell) and the stress causes pregnancy complications. Kayla goes into premature labor and gives birth to her baby boy at 26 weeks. She names him Joe after his paternal grandmother, Jo Johnson. Joe grows stronger only to be kidnapped in the summer of 2008 by Stefano DiMera (Joseph Mascolo). Joe leaves town in early 2009 with his parents. Though off screen, Joe comes back to town in 2011 when his parents separate and later divorce. Joe (Jadon Wells) first appears onscreen in late 2012 during the Christmas episodes. The character is limited to special appearances during Christmas episodes and is last seen in December 2014 during a Christmas party.

=== 2015–2017 ===
In August 2015, a now 16 year old, Joe, also known as Joey returns to Salem with Steve. Joey had left boarding school and found his father in New York City. Joey acts out because he resents Steve for abandoning the family. When Steve leaves town to find Joey's uncle Bo, Joey stows away on the plane. After the two have a heart to heart, where Steve recounts the story of how he and Kayla fell in love, Joey returns home. However, Joey continues causing trouble when he sabotages the electricity in the library at Salem High. Joey bonds with Theo Carver (Kyler Pettis) during Salem's bicentennial celebration and he ends up collapsing outside. Theo gets help and Joey is rushed to the hospital. Steve makes it back in time to see Joey in the hospital and Kayla reveals that there a drugs in his system. However, Joey denies ever taking drugs. While he recovers and gets released from the hospital, it is later revealed that Joey is working with Ava Vitali (Tamara Braun) to orchestrate his parents' reunion—unaware of her past. After his parents reunite, Steve and Kayla discover Ava's back in Salem and assume Joey has been working with her, but he denies it. Joey later admits to Ava that he is in love with her and he kisses her but Ava rejects him and reveals that she is dying. Kayla finds them together and demands that he stay away from her. Joey confides in Steve about his feelings for Ava and is shocked to learn Ava's past and that she may have given birth to Steve's son. Ava later kidnaps Kayla forcing Steve to cooperate with her in exchange for her release and Joey walks on them as they are about to make love. Ava forces Steve to leave town with her and gives Joey Kayla's location to free her. Though they are reunited as a family, Steve's betrayal leaves Joey bitter and angry.

== Development ==
=== Creation and casting ===
On November 24, 2012, Mary Beth Evans announced that child actor Jadon Wells would make his debut in the role of Joey in December 2012. Wells is the real life son of actor Dan Wells who had previously appeared on the series as Stan, the male alter ego of Sami Brady (Alison Sweeney). Jadon's appearances were limited to special Christmas episodes and he last appeared in December 2014.

In March 2015, it was reported that Days of Our Lives had released two casting notices — one of which was for the contract role of the 16 year old Joey. In April 2015, talent agency John Robert Powers San Diego announced that James Lastovic had been cast in the role of Joey Johnson with a two-year contract. Five months prior, Lastovic had quit his day job to do a play for $25 a week. "I had money saved up from the one commercial that I had done and thought I could use the money from that to do the play." However, the play lasted longer than expected and Lastovic ran out of money. "I was so broke that I looked forward to the dinner scene" so he could eat. Fortunately, Lastovic booked Days as the play ended. Lastovic had actually auditioned for the series three years prior. While he wasn't sure for what role he auditioned for Lastovic revealed, "I had the same exact sides when I read for Joey!" Lastovic filmed his first scenes in March 2015 and made his debut on August 28, 2015. During the audition process, Lastovic watched a few episodes of the series to prepare. Casting director Marnie Saitta later informed the young actor that he'd be working with two "adored" veterans in Mary Beth Evans (Kayla) and Stephen Nichols (Patch). "I looked them up online and found some of their scenes from the 1980s. I saw how good they were and I was instantly excited to get to work with them" Lastovic revealed. After he booked the role, Lastovic admitted that he got hooked on the show when he went back to watch Patch and Kayla's love story.

=== Teen years (2015–2017) ===
Stephen Nichols on Joey

He’s very resentful. He doesn’t want to address his father’s absence. He’s just kind of silent and stoic about the whole thing. It’s hard to get two words out of the kid.

— Michael Logan, TV Insider

The production team wanted to establish a teenage set in time for the show's 50th anniversary and Lastovic's casting was just the first in a slew of castings. Executive producer Ken Corday said "Joey will be giving Patch the 'rebel' a little of his own medicine!" Lastovic was very nervous about playing such an important role but Mary Beth Evans invited him over to her home and greeted him with freshly baked cookies. "Seeing Mary Beth holding that plate of cookies, I immediately felt that motherly connection." He credited Evans and Stephen Nichols for making him comfortable. Lastovic also founded a mentor in costar Casey Moss who had joined the series two years prior in the similar role of troubled teenager JJ Deveraux—Joey's cousin. "I think he could see a little bit of himself in me" Lastovic said. Lastovic later admitted that his nerves worked well for his first scenes as Joey had recently run away from boarding school -- "he was supposed to be nervous." So much is changing Joey at the time of his return. "He's just beginning to experience all these new emotions, so he's feeling a little lost." Joey's needing his parents helps bring Patch and Kayla back together after years of estrangement. A promo for the show's 50th anniversary in November 2015 revealed that Joey is secretly conspiring with his father's ex-lover and family rival Ava Vitali (Tamara Braun) to help reunite his parents.

=== Departure ===
In March 2017, after a cryptic tweet by Lastovic's mother, Lucienne, it was rumored that the actor's contract with the series had not been renewed. On Wednesday, August 16, the rumors were proven through by Lastovic himself in an Instagram post, he last aired on August 22 when the character going to prison for Ava's murder.

=== Return and second departure ===
In November 2020, it was revealed in a Christmas promo for the show, that Lastovic will be returning as Joey, Lastovic made his return on December 10, 2020, and made an unannounced exit on December 24, 2020.

=== Second return ===
In June 2022, it was announced Tanner Stein had been cast in the role of Joey and would appear in the second season of Days of Our Lives: Beyond Salem in July of the same year, and will later begin appearing in a recurring capacity on Days of Our Lives.

== Reception ==
Omar White-Nobles of TVSource Magazine praised the decision to age Joey along with the other characters in time for the show's 50th anniversary. "I may be 29, but I'm a fan of the multi-generational aspect of the continuing narrative." Lastovic's debut was "highly anticipated" as it coincided with the onscreen return of Stephen Nichols as Patch. Soap Opera Digest included the actor in its list of the "Hottest Newcomers" for the year 2015. Daytime Confidential also listed Lastovic as number five on their own list of the "Top 20 Soap Opera Newcomers of 2015." The blog praised Lastovic for his portrayal and said Joey's habit of acting out and causing grief for his mother "helps to further ground the Johnsons as Salem's relatable, working central family." Omar Nobles said Joey return provided Kayla with "a greater purpose and more attention in just a few short weeks than the four years since she returned to the show." He continued, "That's smart planning. That's smart creative." The website also praised Lastovic as being one of the strongest of the new younger actors.
