= Frank Parker (actor) =

American television actor

- Frank Parker in The Hardy Boys Nancy Drew Mysteries 1977
- Born: Frank Russell Parker; July 1, 1939
- Died: September 16, 2018 (aged 79); Vacaville, California, U.S.
- Occupation: Actor
- Years active: 1953–2008
- Children: 3 (1 deceased)

Frank Russell Parker (July 1, 1939 – September 16, 2018) was an American television actor.

== Career ==
Parker was best known as Shawn Brady, husband to Caroline (Peggy McCay) on Days of Our Lives. He portrayed the character semi-regularly from 1983 to 2008, when he started having health issues and made the decision to leave. In order to write Parker's character out of the show, Days of Our Lives writers had Shawn die in February 2008 after giving up his oxygen mask to save his son, Bo (Peter Reckell), on a sabotaged airplane that was going down. Parker subsequently retired from acting the following month. He also had some small roles in Never Too Young, The Young and the Restless and General Hospital.

Other acting credits include multiple episodes of Lost in Space, Hogan's Heroes, Battlestar Galactica, CHiPs, and Quincy, M.E.

== Personal life ==
He had three daughters: Candace and twins Lindsay and Danielle. His daughter Candace died in a car accident in 1998. He resided in Vacaville, California. On September 16, 2018, Parker died in Vacaville, California, from complications of Parkinson's Disease and dementia.

== Filmography ==
Year	Title	Role	Notes
1966	The Glass Bottom Boat	Engineer	Uncredited
1968	Stay Away, Joe	Deputy Sheriff Hank Matson	
1969	The Trouble with Girls	Iceman	
1972	Second Chance	Hardin	ABC Movie of the Week
1973	This Is a Hijack	Wyatt	
1973	The Naked Ape	College Professor	
1973	Pets	Dan Daubrey	
1974	Little House on the Prairie	Sean Hearn	“If I Should Wake Before I Die” Season 1, Episode 6 (Credited as Brett Parker)
1976	Midway	Deke	Uncredited
1979	The Concorde ... Airport '79	Technician #2	
1983-2008	Days of Our Lives	Shawn Brady	898 episodes, Contract role, (final appearance)
