= Patsy Pease =

American actress

- Occupation: Actress
- Years active: 1971-present

Patsy Pease is an American actress. She is most known for her role as Kimberly Brady on the soap opera Days of Our Lives.

== Career ==
Pease's first soap opera role was as waitress Cissie Mitchell Sentell on the soap opera Search for Tomorrow, a role she played from 1978 until 1980.

In 1984, Pease debuted as Kimberly Brady on the NBC daytime soap opera Days of Our Lives. Her character was part of a popular supercouple in her love affair and eventual marriage to Shane Donovan (played by Charles Shaughnessy). Pease was on contract with Days Of Our Lives until 1992 and again from 1996 to 1998. In 1990 she took maternity leave, returning from late 1991 to December 1992 after her child was born. Pease has reprised the role in guest appearances multiple times since.

In 2015, Pease joined the cast of the soap opera web series The Bay in the role of Lola Baker. In 2016, she was nominated for an Indie Series Award for Best Guest Actress in a Drama, and a Daytime Emmy Award for Outstanding Actress in a Digital Daytime Drama Series for the role.

== Personal life ==
When Pease returned to Days of our Lives in 1991, she went public with her own story; her mother was schizophrenic and abused her and her two siblings for years.

== Television and film roles ==
- 1978–84: Search for Tomorrow as Cissie Mitchell Sentell
- 1980: He Knows You're Alone as Joyce
- 1983: Trapper John, M.D. as Anita (1 episode)
- 1983: Remington Steele as Sherry Webster (1 episode)
- 1983: Space Raiders as Amanda
- 1984–2016: Days of Our Lives as Kimberly Brady (Contract: 1984–92, 1996-98. Guest returns: 1994, 1999, 2002–04, 2008, 2010, 2013–16, 2018)
- 1992: Silk Stalkings as Jackie Stonewell (1 episode)
- 1994: Hardball as Gloria (1 episode)
- 1995: Improper Conduct as Jo Ann
- 1997: Total Reality as Leader
- 1996: The Young and the Restless as Patricia Fennell
- 1999: Two Shades of Blue as Gwen Reynolds
- 2003: Drop Dead Gorgeous as Mrs. Barris
- 2015: The Bay as Lola Baker
