= Michael Kearns =

Michael Kearns may refer to:

- Michael Kearns (actor) (1950–2026), American actor, writer and director
- Michael Kearns (computer scientist), American computer scientist
- Michael P. Kearns (born 1969), American politician
- Mike Kearns (1929–2009), American basketball player
- Mick Kearns (footballer, born 1938), English footballer
- Mick Kearns (footballer, born 1950), Irish footballer

== See also ==
- Mickey Kearins (born 1943), Gaelic football player
