= Robert Kelker-Kelly =

American actor (1964–2026)

- Born: April 18, 1964; Wichita, Kansas, U.S.
- Died: October 3, 2026 (aged 62); St. Peters, Missouri, U.S.
- Education: University of Kansas (attended)
- Occupations: Actor; pilot
- Years active: 1987–2026
- Known for: Bo Brady – Days of Our Lives; Sam Fowler – Another World; Stavros Cassadine – General Hospital
- Spouses: Linda Rattner (m. 1988; div. 1992); Miriam Parrish (m. 1997; div. 2013); Allison Kelly (m. 2022–2026)
- Children: 1

Robert Kelker-Kelly (April 18, 1964 – October 3, 2026) was an American soap opera actor and professional aircraft pilot, known for playing Bo Brady on the NBC soap opera Days of Our Lives from 1992 to 1995. He was also known for his portrayals of Sam Fowler (originating the role) from 1987 to 1990 and Dr. Shane Roberts from 1996 to 1998 on Another World, and for the role of Stavros Cassadine on General Hospital from 2001 to 2003 and 2013 to 2014.

== Early life and education ==
Kelker-Kelly was born to Jonetta Kelker, a nurse, and Robert Kelly, a pathologist. He had three sisters. His parents divorced when he was seven years old, and he moved in with his father. Kelker-Kelly moved back with his mother at the age of eleven, when his father remarried; his father died three months later from a heart attack, at the age of 42.

He attended Wichita Collegiate School in Wichita, Kansas, from 1977 to 1980, where he was active in the theatre and had major roles in several plays, including Rusty in Guys and Dolls, Bill Sikes in Oliver! and Sir Lionel in Camelot. He briefly attended the University of Kansas but decided to forgo college in favor of pursuing his acting career.

== Career ==
Kelker-Kelly made his acting debut in 1987 as Sam Fowler on the soap opera Another World, a role he originally played from 1987 to 1990. The character of Sam was involved in a front-burner story with socialite Amanda Cory.

In 1992, Kelker-Kelly was chosen to portray Bo Brady, an established role on Days of Our Lives that was being vacated by the creator of the role, actor Peter Reckell. Although Kelker-Kelly was a recast, fans accepted his portrayal of Bo. The character's pairing with Hope Brady (Kristian Alfonso) and reformed bad girl Billie Reed (Lisa Rinna) was a popular storyline and garnered Kelker-Kelly his widest audience. Reckell returned to the role in August 1995. In 1996 he returned to Another World playing a new role, that of professional race car driver Bobby Reno, who was later discovered to actually be Dr. Shane Roberts. He played the role until 1998.

In 1997, Kelker-Kelly moved away from Los Angeles and largely stepped away from acting. He earned a certification in Airframe and Powerplant mechanics (A&P). From 2002 to 2003 he was an acting teacher at the Pioneer Valley Performing Arts Charter Public School in South Hadley, Massachusetts. He later earned a pilot license and became a professional pilot and flight instructor in the St. Peters, Missouri, area, and was certified to fly the GIV, LR60, LR45, CE560 and CE500.

Kelker-Kelly portrayed Stavros Cassadine on General Hospital in 2001, with guest spots in 2002, 2003, 2013 and 2014.

== Personal life and death ==
In 1988, Kelker-Kelly married Linda Rattner; the couple divorced in 1992. He then began dating actress Miriam Parrish, whom he married in 1997 and had a daughter with. They divorced in 2013. He married Allison Kelly in 2022, whom he remained married to until his death.

On October 3, 2026, Kelker-Kelly was found unresponsive at his home in St. Peters, Missouri, after reportedly complaining of chest pain and was subsequently pronounced dead. He was 62. On October 30, it was revealed that he died from coronary artery disease.

== Select filmography ==
- 2001–03, 2013–14: General Hospital as Stavros Cassadine
- 1999: Rescue 77 (episode "Career Day"; 1999)
- 1996: Dream for an Insomniac as Trent
- 1995: Maybe This Time (episode "Julia's Day Off; 1995)
- 1995: Touched by an Angel as Matt Duncan
- 1992–95: Days of Our Lives as Bo Brady
- 1987–90: Another World as Sam Fowler
- 1996–98: Another World as Shane Roberts / Bobby Reno
- 1992: Jack's Place (episode "I See Cupid, I See France"; 1992)
