= Frankie Brady =

- Days of Our Lives character
- Portrayed by: Billy Warlock
- Duration: 1986–88; 1990–91; 2005–06
- First appearance: July 25, 1986
- Last appearance: November 24, 2006
- Created by: Sheri Anderson, Thom Racina and Leah Laiman
- Introduced by: Betty Corday, Ken Corday and Al Rabin
In-universe information
- Other names: François Von Leuschner; Frankie Donner
- Occupation: Lawyer; Relief worker in Africa; Teen crisis hotline worker
- Family: Brady
- Father: Henri Von Leuschner
- Adoptive parents: Shawn Brady; Caroline Brady
- Brothers: Roman Brady (adoptive); Max Brady (adoptive)
- Sisters: Carly Manning; Kimberly Brady (adoptive); Kayla Brady (adoptive)
- Half-brothers: Bo Brady (adoptive)
- Spouse: Eve Donovan (Note: Eve revealed during a conversation with Paige, in 2014, that she and Frankie were once married outside of Salem.); Jennifer Horton (2006)
- Grandfathers: Peter Brady (adoptive)
- Uncles: Eric Brady (adoptive)
- Aunts: Colleen Brady (adoptive); Molly Brady (adoptive)
- Nephews: Nicholas Alamain; Eric Brady (adoptive); Rex Brady (adoptive); Andrew Donovan (adoptive); Joey Johnson (adoptive); Shawn-Douglas Brady (adoptive); Zack Brady (adoptive); Isaac Brady (adoptive)
- Nieces: Melanie Jonas; Carrie Brady Reed (adoptive); Sami Brady (adoptive); Cassie Brady (adoptive); Theresa Donovan (adoptive); Stephanie Johnson (adoptive); Chelsea Brady (adoptive); Ciara Brady (adoptive)
- First cousins: Ryan Brady (adoptive); Colin Murphy (adoptive); Dimitri Von Leuschner

Frankie Brady is a fictional character on the American soap opera Days of Our Lives. The role of Frankie was played by veteran Emmy Award-winning actor Billy Warlock from July 25, 1986 to October 5, 1988, from November 2, 1990 to July 12, 1991 and from June 26, 2005 to November 24, 2006. Christopher Saavedra played the character in a flashback sequence in 1990.

Frankie and his younger "brother" Max are adopted by the Brady clan in the mid-1980s. Frankie later becomes a lawyer, living in Washington D.C.

== Storylines ==
=== 1986–88 ===
Frankie and another boy whom he claims is his younger brother Max first appear in Salem in 1986 as a homeless teenager and child. Shawn and Caroline Brady take them in, and Steve Johnson became a mentor to Frankie. Soon afterward, Frankie meets Jennifer Horton, and although he has feelings for her, he assumes she is unavailable to him because of his background and because she is dating the high school jock Glenn Gallagher.

Toward the middle of the school year, Glenn goes undercover to help the police department capture the person responsible for giving the children drugs; Frankie was accused of being the dealer by their peers and harassed accordingly, until Glenn's anonymity is revealed upon learning his football coach is the drug dealer. Throughout the remainder of the school year, Jennifer and Frankie became close friends, which puts a strain on her relationship with Glenn. Max is shot during the course of the drug dealing sting, causing a strain between Jennifer, Frankie and Glenn. When the Salem High kids travel out of town on Spring Break, Jennifer breaks up with Glenn. Glenn and their peers harass Jennifer and Frankie, who leave the trip early. While on their way back to Salem, Frankie videotapes Jennifer in a convenience store when the cashier is shot and killed in the background. Although they initially escape, Frankie and Jennifer are soon caught by the shooter but they escape again and provide the police department with the videocassette.

In June 1987, Frankie graduates from Salem High School. Not long afterward, Shawn and Caroline legally adopt him and Max. By then, Frankie and Jennifer are becoming close. After they help their friend Sasha Roberts, Frankie and Jennifer admit their feelings for each other and start their relationship.

In September 1987 Jennifer's father Bill Horton returns to Salem with news that Jennifer's mother Laura Horton is in a mental hospital. Fearing she will inherit her mother's illness, Jennifer breaks up with Frankie without explanation. Frankie begins volunteering at the college's teenage help line run by Paula Carson. During this time, Frankie often receives phone calls from a girl who calls herself "Emily," who is really Eve Donovan, which Frankie later discovers. Frankie continues to reach out to Eve, even though at the time her main intentions are to invoke pity from him.

Jennifer overcomes her fears of becoming ill after Frankie has sex with Paula Carson after she reveals her husband had committed suicide. After he and Jennifer reconcile, Frankie and Paula agreed to keep their one-night stand a secret. Eve learned of this, and attempts to break Frankie and Jennifer up by writing an anonymous article in the paper; although Eve does not expose Frankie, she exposes Paula, and Frankie admits to Jennifer he had slept with Paula. Jennifer breaks up with him again, but later forgives him and they resume their relationship.

During mid-1988 a mysterious man comes to town, leading Frankie to tell Jennifer Max is not his biological brother and that the "mystery man" was Max's abusive father, Trent. Frankie leaves town with Max; Jennifer, not knowing whom Trent is, develops a friendship with him. After Frankie and Max are involved in a car accident, Trent's identity is exposed but he chooses not to pursue the custody of Max, and leaves town. Frankie leaves Salem in September 1988 after he is accepted into Columbia University.

=== 1990–91 ===
Frankie is reintroduced in November 1990 as François Von Leuschner, the biological brother of Katerina Von Leuschner, better known as Carly Manning, Jennifer's old friend from boarding school. It is revealed Frankie had first come to Salem in 1986 per Carly's request to look out for Jennifer and left in 1988 because Jennifer was falling in love with him. At the time of his 1990 return, Jennifer and Frankie are kidnapped by Lawrence Alamain, who forces Jennifer to marry him and subsequently rapes her. Frankie's true identity is revealed to Jennifer after the kidnap victims escape. Jennifer is angry but soon forgives Frankie and allows him to move in with her. Frankie continues to prove his devotion to Jennifer by giving up his Von Leuschner inheritance to Lawrence. In exchange, Lawrence agrees to divorce Jennifer. Frankie is also the first person Jennifer tells about the rape. He promises Jennifer he will always be her friend.

Frankie and Jennifer's friendship is a significant aversion to Eve Donovan, who still has feelings for him. Frankie will not allow himself to feel sorry for her as he had in the past. Frankie continues to reach out to Eve on the conditions she will not harass Jennifer nor try to invoke sympathy from him. After Eve is accused of killing Nick Corelli, she, Jennifer, Frankie and Jack take a train trip in an attempt to recover the murder weapon and prove her innocence, and Frankie and Eve began to develop as a couple. Frankie leaves Salem with Eve in July 1991 to live in Africa.

=== 2005–06 ===
Frankie returns to Salem in mid-2005 without Eve, keeping an eye on his supposed younger brother Max. He and Max soon move into an apartment at Jack and Jennifer's property (recently vacated by Patrick Lockhart); Frankie is not over Jennifer. Frankie finds a letter written by Jennifer 20 years ago saying she loves him very much when they were teenagers. Jennifer tries to explain the letter and they both cry and push that into the back of their minds.

Frankie is concerned about Max's romantic involvement with their niece Chelsea but his storyline becomes centered around his close friend Jack Deveraux when he learns Jack was dying and wants him to look after Jennifer when he dies. Frankie agrees and stays to keep trying to persuade Jack to tell Jennifer about his fatal illness. Jack insisted he wants to kept it quiet to save his family the slow angst of watching him die.

During early 2005, Jack disappears and is assumed dead after his car is found crashed and abandoned near a river, but Jack's body is not found. Frankie is divided over keeping Jack's promise and letting Jennifer deal with his death alone; he decided on the latter and plans to leave town. Frankie falls on some ice, resulting in a broken leg and he remains in Salem. Frankie and Jennifer mourn Jack together, growing closer over the next few months.

In mid-2006, Jen and Frankie are about to get married. Jack disappeared because he had gone to a private hospital to die on his own. Jack is not dead yet; he found his long-lost brother Steve, who was also thought to be dead. Steve has no memory of being Jack's brother. Jack and Steve return to Salem together, and Jack stumbles into Jennifer's and Frankie's wedding.

Over the next few months, Jennifer, Jack, and Frankie live together. Frankie uses his connections to try to find a cure for Jack. Jennifer angsts over her old feelings for Jack and her new commitment to Frankie.

Jack's illness is completely cured. Jack and Jennifer go on a reporting assignment, and are kidnapped; they escape and rediscover their feelings for each other. After returning to Salem, Jack and Jennifer are in the hospital for the last time - Jack is cleared to go home. Jennifer has chosen to stay with Jack, and they have a tearful parting with Frankie, who is understanding.

In September 2006, Jack and Jennifer accept a job in London, England. Frankie stays in Salem to help with some court cases, leaving on Thanksgiving night 2006 to work at a firm in Washington, D.C.

== Reception ==
Vani Kambali from Sportskeeda wrote that Frankie is a character who "stands out as a memorable presence". Kambali believed Frankie had an "eventful tenure" during his time on the soap and the fact that he returned several times meant that fans both loved and missed the character. Kambali also wrote, "While he failed to find love in Jen, his fans surely loved his presence on as well as off screen".
