= Shawn Brady =

- Days of Our Lives character
- Frank Parker as Shawn Brady
- Portrayed by: Frank Parker (1983–1984, 1985–1989, 1990–2008); Lew Brown (1984–1985); Peter MacLean (1989–1990); Tanner Maguire (2007, flashbacks)
- Duration: 1983–2008
- First appearance: February 7, 1983
- Last appearance: February 21, 2008
- Created by: Margaret DePriest; Sheri Anderson
- Introduced by: Betty Corday; Al Rabin
In-universe information
- Occupation: Co-Owner of the Brady Pub; Co-Owner of the Brady Fishmarket; Co-Owner of the Brady Junkyard; Fisherman
- Parents: Pete Brady
- Siblings: Colleen Brady; Eric Brady; Molly Brady Murphy
- Spouse: Caroline Brady (1948–2008)
- Sons: Roman Brady; Bo Brady (legal)
- Daughters: Kimberly Brady; Kayla Brady
- Adoptive sons: Frankie Brady (adoptive); Max Brady (adoptive)
- Grandsons: Eric Brady; Shawn-Douglas Brady (legal); Rex Brady; Andrew Donovan IV; Zack Brady (legal); Joey Johnson; Isaac Brady (adoptive)
- Granddaughters: Carrie Brady; Sami Brady; Cassie Brady; Theresa Donovan; Stephanie Johnson; Chelsea Brady (legal); Ciara Brady (legal)
- Grandparents: Patrick Brady; Nora Brady
- Nephews: Ryan Brady; Colin Murphy
- Other relatives: Will Horton; Claire Brady (legal); Allie Horton; Tate Black; Noah Reed; Emily Lockhart; Arianna Horton; Mackenzie Horton; Henry Horton; Beauregard "Bo" Brady-Weston (legal); Isaac Brady (legal)

Shawn Brady is a fictional character from the American soap opera Days of Our Lives and the patriarch of the Brady family. He has been portrayed by Lew Brown (1984 to 1985), Peter MacLean (1989 to 1990), and most notably by Frank Parker (1983 to 1984, 1985 to 1989, 1990 to 2008).

== Casting ==
Shawn Brady was primarily portrayed by Frank Parker from 1983 to 2008, when he retired as his health was reportedly declining. Shawn was subsequently killed-off in a plane crash which was sabotaged. The role was also portrayed by Lew Brown and Peter MacLean. The character has also been referred to as "Grandpa Shawn" in the soap itself and the media.

== Storylines ==
Tanner Maguire as the younger Shawn Brady.

An Irish immigrant, Shawn moves to Salem from his native Galway at an undetermined time. In the early stages of the "Brady-DiMera Feud Resolution" storyline in the early-2000s, it is revealed that Shawn has maintained sporadic contact with family and friends in Ireland throughout the years. Including the "rougher" element of their hometown, who regard Shawn with a great degree of respect and refer to him only as, "Himself" (and who Shawn directs to "rough up" and detain Bo Brady when he was getting a little too curious about past events in Ireland). There are initial hints that Shawn may have had some underworld dealings of his own in his youth and was possibly involved directly in some of the early battles of the feud with the DiMera family, but this is later dropped.

Shawn is the husband of Caroline Brady and father of three biological children Roman Brady, Kimberly Brady and Kayla Brady Johnson and their two adopted children Frankie Brady and Max Brady. In the 1980s, Shawn is shocked to learn that Greek tycoon Victor Kiriakis is the father of his and Caroline's youngest child, Bo Brady, the product of an affair that Caroline had with Victor years earlier. Shawn had been under the assumption that he was Bo's biological father. Shawn also has many grandchildren and great-grandchildren. Shawn and Caroline also have a spot in their hearts for John Black, whom they are tricked into believing is their son Roman for several years until the real Roman returns to town. Originally the owner of the Brady Fish Market, after their business is destroyed and Shawn suffers a massive heart attack, he and Caroline re-open the Fish Market as the Brady Pub, often employing many of their family and friends. Over the years the pub has functioned as a second home for some of their grandchildren and great-grandchildren, and their first great-grandson, Will, spent a great deal of time there while he was growing up.

The son of Peter Brady, and the grandson of Patrick Aloysius and Nora Molly Brady, Shawn has a brother Eric and two sisters, Molly and Colleen. Shawn is devastated when he learns that his brother Eric molested his daughter Kimberly when she was a child, which results in her later developing multiple personality disorder. Molly marries a man with the surname Murphy and has one known child, Colin, who turns out to be working for the DiMeras. In the summer of 2007, it is revealed that Shawn also has an older sister Colleen, who had a relationship with Stefano's father Santo DiMera, and that may have been the start of the Brady – DiMera family feud. Colleen is presumed to have died in a horrible manner at a young age, falling or jumping from a cliff in Galway. Shawn maintains that she was killed by a DiMera, while Santo's son, Stefano, blames Shawn Brady. In reality both could be blamed. Stefano told Shawn that his mother was not dead and his father was still married and on the day of Colleen and Santo's wedding, Shawn told Colleen. Her death is said to have sparked the Brady/DiMera feud that has been going on since Santo's death in the 1980s. In January 2008, Colleen is found not to have killed herself. She has faked her death and left Ireland for South America. She dies days after she and Shawn reunite. Shawn dies after giving up his oxygen mask to save his son, Bo, on a sabotaged airplane that is going down.

== Reception ==
Erik Pedersen from Deadline opined that Shawn had been given a "hero's exit". Soaps.com placed the plane crash that killed Shawn on their list of their top ten dramatic disasters to occur in American soap operas. Violette DeSantis from Soaps She Knows wrote that Shawn had been a "major fixture" in the soap.
