= Kimberly Brady =

Fictional character on the television soap opera, Days of Our Lives

- Days of Our Lives character
- Portrayed by: Patsy Pease (1984–1992, 1994–2016); Anne Marie Howard (1990–1991); Casey Wallace (1992); Ariana Chase (1992–1993)
- Duration: 1984–1994; 1996–1998; 2002–2004; 2008; 2010; 2013–2016
- First appearance: July 24, 1984
- Last appearance: November 28, 2016
- Created by: Margaret DePriest and Sheri Anderson
- Introduced by: Betty Corday and Al Rabin (1984); Ken Corday and Tom Langan (1996); Ken Corday and Stephen Wyman (2002); Ken Corday, Lisa de Cazotte and Greg Meng (2013)
In-universe information
- Other names: Lacey, Claire (alternate personalities); Kimberly Donovan
- Occupation: Therapist; Radio Therapist; ISA Agent; Photographer; Prostitute
- Father: Shawn Brady
- Mother: Caroline Brady
- Brothers: Roman Brady; Frankie Brady (adoptive); Max Brady (adoptive)
- Sisters: Kayla Brady
- Half-brothers: Bo Brady
- Spouse: Shane Donovan (1987–1990, 2010–present)
- Sons: Andrew Donovan
- Daughters: Theresa Donovan
- Stepdaughters: Eve Donovan
- Grandsons: Tate Black
- Grandfathers: Peter Brady
- Uncles: Eric Brady I
- Aunts: Molly Brady; Colleen Brady
- Nephews: Eric Brady; Rex Brady; Joey Johnson; Shawn-Douglas Brady; Zack Brady; Isaac Brady (adoptive)
- Nieces: Carrie Brady; Sami Brady; Cassie Brady; Chelsea Brady; Ciara Brady; Stephanie Johnson
- First cousins: Colin Murphy; Ryan Brady

Kimberly Brady is a fictional character on the television soap opera, Days of Our Lives. Originated by Patsy Pease in July 1984, she is most recognizable for the role. Her initial run lasted until March 1990, but she returned twice from 1991 to 1992, with Anne Marie Howard portraying Kim in the interims. Ariana Chase played the role from December 1992 to June 1993 . Pease returned to the role in 1994, and continued to make appearances until 2016. Casey Wallace played Kimberly in flashback sequences in 1992.

== Casting ==
Patsy Pease originated the role of Shawn and Caroline Brady's eldest daughter on July 24, 1984, remaining until her first departure on March 12, 1990, when Anne Marie Howard stepped in temporarily from March 13 to August 13, 1990, and again briefly from July 17 to August 14, 1991. Pease returned for stints from December 21, 1991 to January 22, 1992, and July 14 to December 22, 1992, until Ariana Chase took over full-time from December 29, 1992, to June 25, 1993. Pease again returned to the role of Kim (and has remained the character's only portrayer since) with stints lasting from June 28 to July 4, 1994, November 1, 1996 to September 23, 1998, 1999, May 30 to June 3, 2002, November 20, 2003, to January 16, 2004, February 27 and 28, 2008, June 24 to July 5, 2010, November 18 to 20, 2013, December 2014, and May 22 to 29, 2015. She last appeared on November 28, 2016. Casey Wallace played the character for newly created flashbacks in 1992.

== Storylines ==
The second-born child of Shawn and Caroline Brady, Kimberly returns to Salem in 1984 after leaving five years earlier for reasons that were unclear to the rest of the Brady family. It was revealed that Kim has been working in Europe as a high class prostitute and sometimes photographer after fleeing Salem to escape years of sexual abuse by her uncle, Eric (Shawn's brother). Shane Donovan was assigned by the ISA to spy on Kimberly as she had incidentally taken photographs of Stefano DiMera's secret island in the Caribbean. Shane invited Kim to go to England to Donovan Manor where they declared their love for one another, during which time, Kim began to experience attacks of temporary blindness. While in England, they were shocked to find Shane's supposedly dead wife, Emma, alive. She had been brainwashed by the Dragon to kill Bo and Hope. Return to Salem alone to get on with her life, Kimberly soon goes blind.

Shane and Emma arrive in Salem, and Shane is shocked to learn Kim is blind. He once again declares his love for her, but Kim backs away from the now-married Shane. Victor Kiriakis befriends Kimberly, though Caroline does not approve as she is afraid that Victor has ulterior motives. Kimberly receives news from Neil Curtis that the disease that caused her blindness is in remission. Still being blind however, Neil explains the cause is now emotional. Devastating Kimberly, Victor uses this to his advantage, inviting Kim to live with him which greatly angers Shane, as he is now investigating Victor for the ISA. Once Kim regains her eyesight, she realises Victor is heavily involved in crime and agrees to help Shane bring him down, resuming their relationship.

In 1985, Kimberly came into possession of a roll of film that contained some prints to the location of a treasure that Victor and Stefano were after, which again would come into play years down the road. In Miami, Bo, Hope, Kim and Shane were all out to destroy Victor's plan. Shane had been imprisoned by Victor, but Kimberly slept with Victor in order to spare Shane's life. Shane escaped, and managed to free Bo and Hope who were trapped with an explosive that was meant to kill them. Later Victor, Savannah Wilder, and Steve Johnson were arrested for their crime. They were all freed when Victor blackmailed Larry Welch into taking the fall for everything. Victor knew Larry killed Megan and used it against him.

In 1986 Kimberly hid the fact that she thought her child was Victor's. It was also at this time that Kim discovered that her mother Caroline Brady had an affair with Victor years earlier and thought that Victor may be her biological father. However it was later revealed that Bo was Victor's son. One day Shane heard Kimberly talking about her fears and quickly broke off their engagement. Later when tests were done to determine the father, Emma Donovan Marshall switched the results, so everyone believed that Victor was the father. During a trip to West Virginia, in hopes of reuniting, Kimberly went into labor in a remote cabin in the woods. Shane delivered the baby, and he pledged his love for Kimberly and the child. They planned to marry even though they believed Victor was Andrew's father. The news infuriated Emma, who tricked Kimberly into signing adoption papers.

in 2023, offscreen, Kimberly treats Harris Michaels at an ISA facility in Frederick, Maryland in order to help Hope find Megan Hathaway and bring her to justice.

== See also ==
- Supercouple
