= Thom Racina =

American screen writer and novelist

Thom Racina is an American television writer and novelist.

== Personal ==
He comes from Kenosha, Wisconsin, and went to school in Albuquerque and Chicago, where he got a MFA in Theatre Arts and Directing.

== Positions held ==
Another World

- Breakdown Writer: 1988
- Script Writer: 1987

Dangerous Women

- Head Writer: 1991

Days of Our Lives

- Co-Head Writer: September 24, 1984 - November 18, 1986; 1994-1995, April 2004-December 2005 (with James E. Reilly)

Jam Bay

- Head Writer: 1994

Family

- Writer: 1978

Family Passions

- Head Writer: 1993 - 1994

Friends and Lovers

- Head Writer: 1994

General Hospital

- Co-Head Writer: 1981 - 1984

Generations

- Co-Head Writer: 1989 - 1991

Santa Barbara

- Breakdown Writer: February 1992 - January 15, 1993
- Co-Head Writer: 1991 - January 1992

Search for Tomorrow

- Script Writer: 1980

The Young and the Restless (hired by Maria Arena Bell fired by Barbara Bloom)

- Script Writer: August 1, 2008 - October 20, 2008

One Life to Live (hired by Prospect Park)

- Head Writer: April 29 - August 19, 2013

== Novels ==
- Kojak: In San Francisco (1976)
- The Great Los Angeles Blizzard (1977); became the basis for the "Ice Princess" story on the American soap opera General Hospital
- Lifeguard (1978)
- Blizzard (1979)
- Nine to Five (1980)
- Tomcat (1981)
- Snow Angel (1996)
- Hidden Agenda (1997)
- Secret Weekend (1999)
- The Madman's Diary (2001)
- Never Forget (2002)
- Deadly Games (2003)
- Deep Freeze (2005)
- Guardian Angel (with Terri Lee Ryan)

== Awards and nominations ==
Daytime Emmy Awards NOMINATIONS

- (1985 & 1987; Best Writing; Days of Our Lives)
- (1983 & 1984; Best Writing; General Hospital)

Writers Guild of America Award NOMINATIONS

- (For 1992 season; Santa Barbara)
- (For 1987 season; Days of Our Lives)

== Head writing tenures ==
Preceded by Pat Falken Smith; Margaret DePriest	Head Writer of General Hospital (with Leah Laiman); September 1981 – March 1982	Succeeded by John William Corrington; Joyce Hooper Corrington
Preceded by Margaret DePriest; Sheri Anderson	Head Writer of Days of Our Lives (with Margaret DePriest: September 24–October 25, 1984) (with Sheri Anderson: September 24, 1984 – November 10, 1986) (with Leah Laiman: December 3, 1984 – November 18, 1986); September 24, 1984 – November 18, 1986	Succeeded by Leah Laiman
Preceded by none	Head Writer of Generations (with Sally Sussman Morina); March 27, 1989 – January 25, 1991	Succeeded by Show canceled
Preceded by Ron Carlivati	Head Writer of One Life to Live (with Susan Bedsow Horgan: April 29–July 15, 2013) (with Jessica Klein: July 1–August 19, 2013); April 29–August 19, 2013	Succeeded by Show canceled
