= Caroline Brady =

- Days of Our Lives character
- Peggy McCay as Caroline Brady
- Portrayed by: Peggy McCay (1983, 1985–2016); Jody Carter (1983–84); Barbara Beckley (1984–85); Holgie Forrester (2019)
- Duration: 1983–2016, 2019
- First appearance: February 7, 1983
- Last appearance: June 19, 2019
- Created by: Margaret DePriest and Sheri Anderson
- Introduced by: Betty Corday and Al Rabin
In-universe information
- Occupation: Owner of the Brady Pub; Former Co-Owner of the Brady Junkyard; Former Co-Owner of the Brady Fishmarket
- Spouse: Shawn Brady (1948–2008)
- Sons: Roman Brady; Bo Brady
- Daughters: Kimberly Brady; Kayla Johnson
- Adoptive sons: Frankie Brady; Max Brady
- Grandsons: Eric Brady; Shawn-Douglas Brady; Rex Brady; Andrew Donovan; Zack Brady; Joey Johnson; Isaac Brady
- Granddaughters: Carrie Reed; Sami Brady; Cassie Brady; Theresa Donovan; Stephanie Johnson; Chelsea Brady; Ciara Brady
- Other relatives: Will Horton; Claire Brady; Johnny DiMera; Allie Horton; Sydney DiMera; Arianna Horton; Tate Black; Noah Reed; Emily Lockhart; Mackenzie Horton; Bo Weston; Issac Brady; Addie Weston

Caroline Brady is a fictional character from the NBC soap opera Days of Our Lives, a long-running serial drama about working class life in the fictional United States town of Salem. Matriarch of the series' Brady family, the character has been continually featured since her debut. Created by writer Margaret DePriest, the role was originated by actress Peggy McCay on February 7, 1983. Jody Carter stepped into the role briefly in 1984, followed by Barbara Beckley from 1984 to 1985. McCay returned to portray Caroline from July 17, 1985, to December 5, 2003, when the character was seemingly murdered by a serial killer. McCay returned in 2004 when Caroline was found alive. She played Caroline for another 12 years; last appearing in August 2016.

McCay was nominated for the Daytime Emmy Award for Outstanding Lead Actress in a Drama Series for the role in 1986, 1987, 2013 and 2015. Actor Peter Reckell, who has played Caroline's son Bo Brady on and off since 1983, named the scenes of Caroline's 2003 death as among his top five storylines. McCay's final appearance was on August 24, 2016. She died on October 7, 2018.

== Background ==
Caroline Brady is one of the early characters introduced by Betty Corday and Margaret DePriest. The show was slowly starting to introduce a new family to the canvas, the Brady family, and needed a matriarch. As such, Caroline's children are Roman, Kimberly, and Kayla Brady (with Shawn), Bo Brady (with Victor Kiriakis), and adopted children Frankie Brady and Max Brady. She also has a special place in her heart for John Black, whom she once believed was Roman. Over time, the Brady family cemented their place as the second core family on the show.

Caroline's storylines focus on family troubles. She is portrayed as a stoic, opinionated battle-axe—a family-oriented woman. Caroline's marriage to Shawn Brady was central to the character, until his onscreen death in 2008. A famous episode in 1986 included Bo discovering that his mother's ex-lover, Victor Kiriakis, was his father. Peggy McCay announced Caroline's retirement from the serial in 2003, and the character was killed off in a "whodunnit?" murder storyline, with McCay exiting the series in 2003 but, returning the following year when Caroline turned up alive. McCay again left the role on October 30, 2012, but announced she would return in late November. On June 19, 2019, Caroline appeared in her great-grandson Will's near-death experience, telling him that it's not the right time for him to die. Since actress Peggy McCay died October 7, 2018, Caroline's appearance was accomplished with the use of bright light, a blurred lens, and a stand-in. As Will regains consciousness, Roman calls Kimberly and Caroline to tell them the good news and finds out from Kimberly that Caroline has died peacefully in her sleep.

== Storylines ==
Caroline and her husband Shawn Brady, the parents of Roman, Bo, Kimberly and Kayla Brady, arrive in Salem on February 7, 1983 (their estranged daughter Kimberly comes to town later in 1984). Crime lord Victor Kiriakis appears in 1985 and pursues old flame Caroline. She refuses him, and a vindictive Victor becomes romantically involved with Kimberly and opens a business to compete with the Brady Fishmarket. Police officer Bo hopes to arrest Victor for his many crimes. When he nearly shoots Victor, Caroline suddenly reveals that Bo is Victor's son, the product of a secret affair. Though Bo hates Victor, he agrees to allow Victor into his life as a means to protect Caroline from him. Seeing how tormented Bo is by the truth, Victor eventually pretends to have had a vasectomy in the past so that Bo can believe that Shawn is actually his father.

Caroline and Shawn adopt orphaned brothers Frankie and Max around 1987. Kayla is wrongly arrested for the murder of Marina Toscano in 1989, and Caroline makes a false confession in order to save her. Kayla is convicted anyway and gives birth to her daughter Stephanie in prison in 1990, though she is ultimately exonerated. That year Shawn and Caroline also meet Dr. Carly Manning, who soon becomes involved with Bo after the presumed death of his wife Hope. Kayla's husband Steve Johnson is also presumed dead in 1990; Caroline is furious when Kayla becomes involved with Kim's ex Shane Donovan, and when Kim romances the sinister Lawrence Alamain. In 1993, Vivian Alamain attempts to kill a sedated Caroline as part of her plan to frame Carly for a series of murders, but Carly walks in before Caroline is harmed.

Caroline has a heart attack in 1994 after Roman's young daughter Sami reveals that she is pregnant by her half-sister Carrie Brady's fiancé at their wedding. At the same time, it is revealed that Roman's daughter Belle is actually the product of an affair between his wife Marlena and John Black. In Winter 2003, several Salem residents are murdered by the Salem Stalker, and Caroline herself is poisoned and dies in church on December 5, 2003. Marlena is revealed to be the serial killer and murders a few other people before being killed herself. After her burial, Marlena awakens in Melaswen, a copy of Salem built on a remote tropical island by the villainous Tony DiMera. Caroline and all of Marlena's "victims" are alive and living there as captives, Tony having faked their deaths and manipulated a drugged Marlena. As everyone tries to escape, Tony initiates a volcanic eruption that itself causes a tsunami to strike the island. Some people are saved, but Caroline and Victor are among those presumed dead. They later appear as captives at a European castle, and are rescued in August 2005; in 2007 it is revealed that Tony's cousin André DiMera had been impersonating him during that time.

Caroline is devastated in 2008 when Shawn dies; he had given Bo his oxygen mask as their sabotaged plane was going down. Caroline continues running the Brady Pub with the help of her returned son Max, who learns that his biological father is Salem University Dean Trent Robbins. Max is soon furious with the unsavory Trent, whom Caroline warns away from Max. After several confrontations with Trent, Caroline sees him while visiting Shawn's grave; having been stabbed, he stumbles toward her and dies, and Caroline is arrested for his murder. She is later exonerated when Nick Fallon is revealed to be the murderer.

In 2010, Caroline switches the pregnancy results of the real father of Chloe's baby. On November 11, 2010, Chloe gives birth to Philip's son Parker Jonas, whom Chloe names after Daniel's mother's maiden name. Chloe and Philip are still unaware that he is the real father, since Caroline switched the pregnancy results. Although years later Chloe does find out that Daniel is the father after an getting a reliable paternity test is done outside of Salem.

In October 2012 Caroline starts having memory lapses, these increase over time with Caroline calling Bo 'Shawn' and 'Roman' and referring to Victor as 'My Shawn.' Bo is concerned by this and Caroline sees Kayla and they are all concerned that it could be the early stages of Alzheimer's disease. Caroline returned from her treatment on November 29, 2012. Caroline eventually goes to live with her daughter Kimberly.

Caroline became a great-great-grandmother to Arianna Grace; her great-grandson Will's daughter. On June 19, 2019, Will sees his great-grandmother Caroline in a near-death experience event while succumbing to a brain tumor. Her apparition tells him to go back and that it's not his time to die. As Will awakens, Kimberly tells Roman over the phone that their mother Caroline has died in her sleep. On June 20, The Brady family holds a wake for her at The Brady Pub.
