= Bo Brady =

Fictional character from Days of Our Lives

- Days of Our Lives character
- Peter Reckell as Bo Brady
- Portrayed by: Peter Reckell (1983–1992, 1995–present); Robert Kelker-Kelly (1992–1995)
- Duration: 1983–1987; 1990–2012; 2015–2016; 2022–present
- First appearance: May 3, 1983
- Created by: Margaret DePriest and Sheri Anderson
- Introduced by: Betty Corday and Al Rabin (1983); Ken Corday and Al Rabin (1990); Ken Corday, Albert Alarr and Greg Meng (2015); Ken Corday and Albert Alarr (2022)
- Spin-off appearances: Days of Our Lives: One Stormy Night (1992); Days of Our Lives: Night Sins (1993); Days of Our Lives: Beyond Salem (2022)
In-universe information
- Other names: Beauregard Aurelius Brady; Shane Donovan
- Occupation: Police detective; Bounty hunter; Merchant marine
- Father: Victor Kiriakis
- Mother: Caroline Brady
- Stepfather: Shawn Brady
- Stepmother: Maggie Horton
- Half-brothers: Roman Brady; Frankie Brady (adoptive); Max Brady (adoptive); Xander Kiriakis; Philip Kiriakis
- Half-sisters: Kimberly Brady; Kayla Brady; Isabella Toscano
- Wife: Hope Williams Brady (1985–1995, 2000–2012, 2013–2014); Carly Manning (1991–1992); Billie Reed (1995, 1997–1998)
- Sons: Shawn-Douglas Brady; Zack Brady
- Daughters: Chelsea Brady; Ciara Brady
- Grandchildren: Claire Brady; Bo Brady-Weston; Isaac Brady; Addie Weston
- Grandparents: Peter Brady (legal); Yurgos Kiriakis; Sophie Kiriakis
- Aunts and uncles: Eric Brady (legal); Colleen Brady (legal); Molly Brady (legal); Alexander Kiriakis; Titus Kiriakis; Deimos Kiriakis
- Nephews: Eric Brady; Rex Brady; Andrew Donovan; Joey Johnson; Brady Black; Tyler Kiriakis; Isaac Brady (adoptive)
- Nieces: Carrie Brady; Sami Brady; Cassie Brady; Theresa Donovan; Stephanie Johnson; Victoria Kiriakis
- First cousins: Justin Kiriakis; Ryan Brady (legal); Colin Murphy (legal)
- Other relatives: Will Horton; Allie Horton; Johnny DiMera; Sydney DiMera; Tate Black; Rachel Black; Sonny Kiriakis; Emily Lockhart

Bo Brady is a fictional character from the NBC daytime soap opera Days of Our Lives. The role has been most notably portrayed by Peter Reckell, who originated the role on May 3, 1983.

== Creation and casting ==
Created under head-writer Margaret DePriest, the role was originated by Peter Reckell on May 3, 1983. Rebellious blue-collar Bo was paired with more upper-class Hope Williams (Kristian Alfonso), forming one of the show's first and most popular supercouples. Reckell left the show alongside Alfonso on April 20, 1987. Reckell returned from April 19, 1990, to January 17, 1992, until Robert Kelker-Kelly stepped into the role from March 13, 1992, to July 24, 1995. Reckell returned to portray Bo on August 1, 1995. Tom Cruise auditioned for the role.

In June 2012, after much speculation, it was confirmed that Reckell would once again exit the soap. Reckell filmed his final scenes for Days of our Lives on July 24, 2012, last airing on October 30. On March 18, 2015, it was announced that Reckell had signed a deal to return for the show's fiftieth anniversary, airing on August 28, 2015. In May 2016, it was announced that Reckell would return for a special episode centered around Hope, airing on June 7 and 8, 2016.

== Storylines ==
Bo was born on November 5, 1963 and is the only son of Caroline Brady (Peggy McCay) and Victor Kiriakis (John Aniston). However, Bo is raised as the youngest child of Caroline and her husband Shawn Brady (Frank Parker) until his paternity reveal in 1985. Bo returned to Salem in 1983 and married Hope Williams (Kristian Alfonso) shortly after. The couple later welcomed their son, Shawn-Douglas Brady. Bo later became a detective at the Salem Police Department. In 2000, Bo and Hope welcomed another son, Zack. During the Salem Stalker storyline, Bo loses his mother and older brother Roman (Josh Taylor). He rejoined the police force to help solve the case and was forced to arrest his former sister-in-law, Dr. Marlena Evans (Deidre Hall). All the victims were discovered on a mysterious island and Bo was on the rescue team. He was also reunited with his ex-wife, Billie Reed (Julie Pinson). On New Year's Day in 2006, Zack was hit by a car driven by Bo and Billie's daughter, Chelsea (Rachel Melvin). To protect Chelsea, Bo hid the truth believing it would destroy his family. In 2008, Chelsea saved Bo's life by donating part of her pancreas when he began failing. Bo suffered a concussion and temporarily experienced psychic visions. In 2012, Bo quit the force after budget cuts and accompanied Caroline to California for Alzheimer's treatment. Caroline eventually returns, but Bo decides to go sailing as it was a lifelong dream of his. Hope and their daughter went sailing with him for a brief vacation however all the boat scenes only include Hope and Ciara in the cabin by themselves.

In late 2013-early 2014, Hope revealed that Bo went to Europe to continue investigating the DiMeras on his own. However, as time went on and his investigation took on a wider scope (ostensibly as part of a larger ISA mission), so did his absence from home, and Hope.

In March 2014, John Black delivered a message to Hope that Bo's investigation had branched off into a larger, more powerful, and more dangerous criminal organization than even the DiMeras, and is working deep undercover in Europe to bring them down, and may not be back for another year or more. Bo's situation even precluded him from contacting friends and family, and a letter to Hope was the last known contact any Salemite had with him.

Beginning September 2015, Bo was seen being held captive and tortured in a dirty prison, later revealed to be in Mexico. When Steve, with John's help, began to track him down, he was moved to an equally filthy hospital-looking facility. Steve, John, and Victor uncover that Bo was working with Victor to help Dr. Salinas find a cure for Caroline's Alzheimer's-type condition. This may have also been at the same time that he was involved in an investigation that may or may not have involved the ISA which had taken him to northern Europe. He was then lured by a Britta Englund-lookalike to Mexico. In November 2015, Bo started to blackout and experienced headaches. Thanks to his sister, Kayla, he underwent testing and was diagnosed with an inoperable terminal brain tumor. In the location of their first kiss, Bo tells Hope of his condition. Bo and Hope passionately repeat their wedding vows to each other as Bo becomes extremely pale and weak. Hope told Bo that his nephew Will was murdered last month, at which he was devastated. Then Bo lost consciousness and died in Hope's arms, while snow started to fall on them.

In 2022, it is revealed that Bo had been resurrected by Megan Hathaway. He is brainwashed into being her henchmen and attempted to make him love her but his willpower was still strong. He forsakes his former life, that he doesn't remember, and embraces his heritage as a Kiriakis and attempts to follow in Victor's dark footsteps. Steve and Kayla fail to reach him but when he encounters Hope, his feelings for her start to resurface. He tries to shoot her off a cliffside, but eventually she gets him to remember her, calling her "Fancy Face". However, Bo is shot by Shawn, believing his mother was in danger. Bo lives but remains in a coma.

In 2025, he becomes septic, but he is given a miracle drug to cure him thanks to Steve, Shawn, and John Black who dies from his wounds on this mission. When he wakes up, he learns of the deaths of Victor, Doug, and John, saddening him. However, he meets his grandchildren through Ciara, Bo and Addie, which lifts his spirits as well as reassuring Shawn that what happened on the cliff was no one's fault but Megan's. After saying a few words at John's memorial and reminiscing with around Salem, the couple leave for another chapter in their new life.

== Reception ==
In 2020, Charlie Mason from Soaps She Knows placed Bo as third place on the list of the 35 most memorable characters from Days of Our Lives, saying "To this day, we can’t hear “Holding Out for a Hero” without thinking of the iconic anti-hero that Peter Reckell created. And don’t even get us started on what happens when we hear “Tonight I Celebrate My Love for You"" Mason also placed Bo 24th on his ranked list of Soaps' 40 Most Iconic Characters of All Time, writing, "Until Peter Reckell rode onto the screen in the 1980s, we had no idea that Hope Williams' true love was going to turn out to be the hero for whom we were holding out".
