= Victor Kiriakis =

Fictional character on NBC's Days of Our Lives

- Days of our Lives character
- Portrayed by: John Aniston; Paul Michael Nieman (2024)
- Duration: 1985–2022
- First appearance: July 19, 1985
- Last appearance: December 26, 2022 as portrayed by Aniston, June 2024 in a flashback to summer 2023 as portrayed by another actor
- Created by: Sheri Anderson, Thom Racina and Leah Laiman
- Introduced by: Betty Corday, Ken Corday and Al Rabin
- Spin-off appearances: Days of Our Lives: Night Sins (1993)
In-universe information
- Occupation: Crime boss; Businessman; Drug lord
- Family: Kiriakis
- Parents: Yurgos Kiriakis; Sophie Kiriakis
- Brothers: Alexander Kiriakis; Titus Kiriakis
- Half-brothers: Deimos Kiriakis
- Wife: Carly Manning (1991); Kate Roberts (1993–1995) (Note: Victor and Kate were originally married on September 8, 1993. The marriage was proven to be invalid in March 1994 when it was revealed that Kate was still married to Curtis Reed when they married. They married in 1995 again but because on January 19, 1995, Vivian Alamain tricked Victor into marriage during the rehearsal dinner, this marriage was also invalid); Vivian Alamain (1995–1997, 2010–2023); Nicole Walker (2002–2008) (Note: After their divorce on August 5, 2008, Victor and Nicole's marriage was deemed invalid when it was revealed that she was still legally married to Trent Robbins); Maggie Horton (2011–2023) (Note: After Victor's funeral, Vivian claimed her divorce from Victor was never finalized, with Justin Kiriakis verifying her claims during the September 11, 2023, episode.)
- Sons: Bo Brady; Xander Kiriakis; Philip Kiriakis
- Daughters: Isabella Toscano
- Stepsons: Lucas Horton (1993–1995); Daniel Jonas (2011–16)
- Stepdaughters: Melissa Horton; Sarah Horton; Summer Townsend
- Grandsons: Shawn-Douglas Brady; Brady Black; Zack Brady; Tyler Wilkins
- Granddaughters: Chelsea Brady; Ciara Brady; Victoria Kiriakis
- Grandparents: Demetrius Kiriakis; Antonia Kiriakis
- Aunts and uncles: Aristotle Kiriakis; Athena Kiriakis
- Nephews: Justin Kiriakis
- Other relatives: Claire Brady; Issac Brady; Bo Weston; Addie Weston

Victor Kiriakis is a fictional character on NBC's Days of Our Lives. The role was portrayed by John Aniston from 1985 until his death in 2022, with a storyline-driven absence in 2004 when his character was "killed off" but found alive on the island of Melaswen. Aniston received a Daytime Emmy Award for Outstanding Supporting Actor in a Drama Series nomination in 2017 for his portrayal of Victor.

== Storylines ==
Victor was born in Nafplion, Greece, and emigrated to the United States with his family as a child. He grew up and spent most of his childhood in rather modest circumstances in Salem, but then returned to Greece with his family as a young man, where he apparently made his fortune on both legitimate and illegitimate fronts. Victor came to Salem in 1985 as an old friend of the Brady clan. As time went on, it was revealed that he was not only a former paramour of Brady matriarch Caroline, and the biological father of Bo Brady, but that he was involved in various underhanded dealings around town.

Initially a quiet sponsor of a local drugs-and-prostitution ring, it was eventually fleshed out that Victor was a full-fledged mobster, with underworld connections in Greece and Italy as well as throughout the US, partnerships and rivalries with other villains (including the nefarious Stefano DiMera), and was the subject of various investigations by the local police and a fictional crime-fighting spy agency called the International Security Alliance (ISA). Victor's organization engaged in many schemes and plots all over the world during the late 80s and early 90s, including selling military secrets to the Soviets, hiding stolen Treasury bonds in Stockholm, Sweden, and stealing a computer disk from the U.S. government that turned out to be made of an indestructible material with various potential military applications. It was during this heyday that even the music played at the beginning of Victor's scenes resembled the main theme of The Godfather.

Notably, Victor was the man most responsible for bringing the amnesiac John Black to Salem in 1986, having "outbid" corrupt ISA chief George Nickerson for Black, who was "offered up" by the DiMera organization under the guise of possibly being the believed-dead Roman Brady. Victor also was part of the game called "The Purse, The Power, and The Pawn" in which he, Nickerson and Ileya Petrov; who had taken over the presumed dead Stefano Dimera's criminal enterprise, fought to get money and ultimately the biggest prize of them all; the Pawn, aka John Black. Victor had Petrov killed in 1986 outside a cabin. But, in 2016 it came to light that somehow Petrov had moved to the United States in 1987 and worked for an academy that trained assassins which is where John Black was originally trained before having his memory wiped. Though, technically he was trained before that time. The writers changed the storyline. Victor worked to help restore Black's memory and learn his true identity, until Black escaped. (Victor eventually became aware that Black wasn't the real Roman Brady, and was upset that he had been tricked by Stefano DiMera. Information contained in files in his possession ultimately led to the return of the real Roman, the "Tale of Two Romans" saga, and the surrounding Mexican caper involving the location of an ancient and mysterious Mayan treasure.)

Victor is the father of Isabella Toscano. Eventually, Victor "semi-retired"; in an effort to win the love and respect of his children, he eventually renounced his evil ways and became a legitimate, albeit still ruthless, businessman. However, occasionally Victor will use some of his old underworld connections to help his family and friends out of a jam. The Kiriakis name still commands considerable respect (and fear) in the underworld; few criminals of standing would knowingly or willingly cross Victor Kiriakis (at least without the protection of the DiMeras or some other powerful organization.) At one point, his son Philip, young and irresponsible (probably because he grew up pampered due to his father's wealth,) foolishly became indebted through illegal gambling to a criminal gang, who injured him in a ritualistic manner as a warning to him to pay up. Victor recognized the injury from his old criminal dealings, and, as well as punishing his son Philip, warned the gang's head (who had not realized that his gang was harassing the son of Victor Kiriakis) both verbally and with violent retributory attacks to renounce Philip's indebtedness, blowing up the home of the mob boss by Niko, one of Victor's former bodyguards, after they made sure the home was empty. Even before Victor began his attacks, the man was extremely respectful merely at the realization that he was speaking with Victor Kiriakis, and very frightened and apologetic when he realized that he may have harassed his son. In more recent years, it's been slowly revealed that Victor and the Kiriakis organization still maintains a very strong hand in the underworld, with deals and rivalries with the DiMera family and other criminals.

Victor was briefly married to Nicole Walker, who had saved his life when Kate Roberts was trying to have him killed during Greta's coronation. Nicole had an affair with Colin Murphy and Victor wanted a divorce. In February 2004, Nicole got Jan Spears to kill Victor by electrocuting him in his bathtub. Victor survived the attempt on his life and was held prisoner by Andre DiMera with other victims of the Salem Serial Killer. While on Melaswen, Victor kept a low profile and reconnected with his former love, Caroline Brady. Nicole was stunned when Victor returned to Salem in August 2005 and he made it his mission to get revenge.

When Phillip went missing in action during his second tour, Victor reverted to his old ways and was disowned by both his son Bo, and grandson Shawn, because he attempted to take Shawn's daughter Claire for Philip (who had raised Claire since birth, believing the child to be legally his). Victor won Philip custody, but Claire was taken out of the country by Belle and Shawn. Philip eventually found them on the island of Tinda Lau, near Australia. After surviving a typhoon in the Pacific, Philip agreed to drop the pursuit of custody if Belle and Shawn would allow him to be a part of Claire's life, to which they were okay with. This disappointed Victor, but he has since learned to accept it.

After a brief absence from Salem, Victor made a dramatic return during John Black's funeral, with an extremely moving eulogy to a man who was once his bitter enemy, but eventually became a beloved friend and trusted member of his family and inner circle. Victor made attempts to amend his relationship with Bo. Victor's relationship with Bo rebounded in early 2008 following the death of Shawn Sr. Victor's was there for Caroline and helped support her through her grief. Victor also took an active role in helping Bo overcome his illness by bringing his godson Dr. Daniel Jonas to Salem.

Victor suffered from a stroke and was incapacitated at University Hospital under the care of Dr. Daniel Jonas. Somehow, Victor was aware that Bo had received evidence that would possibly implicate Philip in the disappearance of Paul Hollingsworth. Recovering in the hospital from his stroke, Victor commiserated with Kate and expressed his fear that the worst may be yet to come for Philip.

On December 22, 2008, Victor asked his grandson Brady Black to be the Vice CEO of Titan Industries. Brady and Arianna found he was once the drug lord before selling his business to EJ DiMera. When Vivian Alamain returns to town, Victor begins dating her once again, and marries her to protect his ex-wife Carly Manning from her wrath.

In late 2010 Victor befriends and soon develops feelings for Maggie Horton. While still married to Vivian Alamain, Victor begins to woo the recently widowed Maggie. Vivian is furious, and plots to bury Maggie alive out of jealousy. By chance, it is Vivian who is entombed, and after escaping, traps Maggie. Victor helps save her, but Maggie learns that Victor knew that Vivian had been in the casket and had done nothing. Freed due to lack of evidence against her, Vivian realizes that Victor loves Maggie and not her, and divorces Victor. Maggie and Victor are officially a couple as of March 2011, and have shared one long-awaited on-screen kiss. Victor and Maggie are married as of November 2011.

Victor's character has finally developed into that of a rather crusty "elder statesman" of Salem, maintaining his position as the head of Titan Industries and the mighty Kiriakis family, but delegating more of the "heavy lifting" on both the legitimate and "shadier" fronts to other, younger family members and associates. Victor's scenes have become fan favorites of late due to his biting sarcasm and witty one-liners, and his general desire to see family and friends safe and happy as he rounds out his twilight years. In April 2014, Victor hosted his grandnephew Sonny's wedding to Will Horton.

While Victor remained happily married to Maggie, his life took a dramatic turn when his much younger brother Deimos showed up in early 2016, blaming him for his imprisonment many years before Victor settled in Salem. Deimos vowed to steal everything that Victor held near and dear, and even arranged for Maggie to have an accident which led her to break her back and become crippled once again. Maggie struggled for many months to regain the use of her legs, dealing with severe depression as a result, but with patience from Victor, was able once again to walk. Victor was shocked also during this time by the sudden murder of his arch-enemy Stefano DiMera by his daughter-in-law, Hope Brady.

In August 2023, Victor is killed off screen due to his plane crashing into the Mediterranean Sea.

In the fall of 2023, it was revealed that Victor's long lost son is actually Xander Kiriakis, who was raised by Victor's brother Titus and his wife as their son, and that Victor's will was altered by Brady's ex-wife, Theresa Donovan and his longtime friend and lawyer, Konstantin Meleounis (John Kapelos), who is bitter because Victor left him out of the will.

In June 2024, Victor appears in Konstantin's flashback to summer 2023, through an unseen actor, of his and Victor's last meeting where he watched Victor draft a new will. It is also revealed Konstantin sabotaged his plane which led to his death.

== Reception ==
In 2020, Charlie Mason from Soaps She Knows placed Victor #25 on their list of the 35 most memorable characters from Days of Our Lives, commenting "Cut from the same expensive cloth as The Young and the Restless's Victor Newman and General Hospital's Edward Quartermaine, John Aniston's formidable Kiriakis patriarch is a millionaire misanthrope for the ages."
