= Steve Johnson and Kayla Brady =

Fictional couple in the soap opera Days of Our Lives

Steve and Kayla
- Stephen Nichols and Mary Beth Evans as Steve and Kayla
- Duration: 1986–90, 2006–09, 2015–
- Introduced by: Betty Corday; Ken Corday; Al Rabin
In-universe information
- Other names: Stayla & Payla
- Family: Brady; Johnson
- Spouse: 1988–89, 1990–2012, 2017–
- Children: Stephanie Johnson; Joey Johnson

Steve "Patch" Earl Johnson and Dr. Kayla Caroline Brady are a supercouple on the American soap opera Days of Our Lives. Steve is portrayed by Stephen Nichols and Kayla is portrayed by Mary Beth Evans. On internet message boards, the couple is often referred to by the portmanteau "Stayla" (for Steve and Kayla). The couple was initially popular from 1986 through 1990 until the "death" of Steve. Both characters have since returned: after being presumed dead for 16 years, Steve returned to the show on June 9, 2006, and Kayla returned on June 12, 2006, before both departed again in February 2009. Kayla returned in December 2011. In August 2015, Steve returned to Salem, and the couple reunited soon after.

== Storyline ==
=== 1986-1990 ===
Steve Johnson was a former Merchant Marine who came to Salem working as a mercenary. He had a vendetta against his former best friend, Bo Brady (Kayla's brother) who had gouged out his eye during a fight long ago. His bad boy image and criminal actions were no match for the beautiful good girl, Kayla Brady. One night, he rescued her from a street gang and left a note with his number on her car, and eventually, the two fell in love.

Kayla pushed Steve away, but he was undeterred. He kept trying to convince her that they were meant to be together. Kayla's family were opposed to the pairing, most especially Bo Brady, who believed Steve to be dangerous. Steve received an incredible shock when his sister came to town. Adrienne had been born after Steve's mother had brought Steve and baby Billy to an orphanage. Steve had been 5, Billy had been a young baby. Jo Johnson (Steve's mother) was afraid her husband Duke would kill the children (or vice versa) due to Duke's extremely violent nature. Steve wanted nothing to do with Adrienne or Jo, but deep down, he was yearning for the mother he had loved and hoped to see again.

Duke ended up raping his virgin daughter, Adrienne, when she refused to tell him where to find her mother. She shot him in self-defense when he staggered over to her to do it again, and then she blocked out the memory of the rape and the killing. Steve tried to take the blame and developed a strong protectiveness towards his sister. Adrienne remembered what had happened just in time, during the trial, and Steve was exonerated. He started to push Kayla even further away, blaming her at first for not letting him kill Duke when he had had a chance (before the rape) and then fearing that he would be just like Duke, after his mother angrily told her children that Duke hadn't always been so bad when they confronted her on her decision to ever hook up with a man like him. She told Steve that Steve reminded her of Duke in many ways, not realizing how painful those words would be.

Then an acquaintance of Kayla's, Jack, shows up. Jack is madly in love with Kayla but Kayla does not return the feelings. Jack pursues Kayla, hoping to eventually win her over. The Deveraux Family hires Kayla to be Jack's private nurse when he is diagnosed with Hodgkin's Disease and quite ill. Steve learns the truth that Jack is his own brother, Billy. When he did, he shunned Kayla, hoping she would end up with Jack so his brother would have someone special with whom to spend his seemingly final days. Believing Steve was no longer interested in her, Kayla accepted a marriage proposal from Jack.

Jack (now played by Matthew Ashford) recovered, but Kayla rebuffed every one of his attempts to consummate the marriage, unable to let her love for Steve go. Jack assumed Kayla was just nervous because they didn't know each other all that well. He knew she didn't love him, suspected that there were still feelings between Steve and Kayla, but he still remained hopeful that she would someday love him.

Months later, Steve discovered Kayla was being poisoned. Suspecting it to be someone in the Deveraux house, and heartbroken that it could be his baby brother, he kidnapped her and the two *almost had sex. They carried on their affair in secret. Kayla wanted to get out of her marriage, but Jo and Steve begged her to wait until Jack's political election had passed. On New Year's Eve/Day, Jack planned a romantic evening for them, and Kayla feigned illness so she and Steve could be together that night. A photographer snapped pictures of them kissing on New Year's Eve, while at the same time, a disconsolate Jack was searching for his wife at a party to do the new years countdown together. Worried what they were doing was wrong, the two said a heartfelt goodbye, something they would do over and over again.

A few weeks later, Jack won the political election and an unscrupulous reporter gave him the compromising pictures, intending to blackmail him. Enraged by her behavior and believing that Kayla and Steve had deliberately set out to hurt him, Jack confronted Kayla, and angrily raped her. Steve discovered this, fought his brother, and nearly killed him when Jack fell off the roof where they were fighting. In the aftermath, as Jack suffered from failing kidneys, Steve donated one of his own to save his brother's life. Jack resented - and even harassed - Steve and Kayla, but the revelation that he was Steve's brother and that his own father Harper had been a serial killer (who had tried to poison Kayla) would change his life, eventually for the better.

Steve saved Kayla from Harper once more, but Kayla ended up losing her ability to speak following surgery to repair her hearing. When Jack discovered that Kayla was deaf and that part of the reason she was deaf was the stresses in her life, including his own violent behavior, he sadly granted her a divorce.

Steve learned to use sign language to communicate with her. Kayla's speech returned on her wedding day when she said "I do" to marrying Steve.

A couple of years later, Steve's supposedly dead wife, Marina, resurfaced. She wanted to get back together with Steve, but instead asked for his help in finding a special key. A pregnant Kayla thought it was the best thing to do in the hopes Marina would grant Steve a divorce so they could truly be married. Marina had every intent of rekindling things with Steve, but Jack, who was now well on his way to reforming did his level best to bring Steve and Kayla back together, despite Steve and Kayla's insistence that he stay away from them.

After going all the way to Italy and back, Marina ended up dead and Kayla was accused of the murder. Due to doctored videotape evidence, Kayla was sentenced to prison for ten years. She gave birth to a daughter, Stephanie, who Steve would raise while Kayla was in prison. However, a deranged nanny kidnapped Stephanie. Kayla escaped prison and she and Steve followed the kidnapper to Australia where, along with Bo and Hope, they were able to recover their baby. Now a newspaper man, Jack Deveraux worked with Jennifer Horton (his employee and future wife) to help push public opinion Kayla's way and help find out who really killed Marina. The evidence against Kayla was soon discovered to be a fraud when Isabella, Marina's sister, remembered that she had killed her sister during a violent altercation and Kayla was allowed to return to Salem, a free woman.

Steve and Kayla were married again in 1990, this time with Jack Deveraux as best man. The incident with Marina had changed his relationship with Steve and Kayla and Steve was tentatively trying to welcome his brother into his life. Kayla, while always uncomfortable around Jack, tried to make peace with their past and allow the relationship to grow between the brothers.

Tragedy would strike, however, when Steve was caught in an explosion aboard Bo Brady's boat. It was no accident; the explosion was meant to kill Bo and was planned by the evil oil baron Lawrence Alamain. Steve survived the blast, but because he thought Steve had evidence against him, Lawrence had Steve's IV poisoned. With a grief-stricken Kayla at his side, Steve died. However, an empty coffin was buried in his grave.

=== Sixteen years later ===
Presumed dead after his car went into a river, Jack Deveraux was on his deathbed in a hospice. He was awaiting death, and refusing to let his wife Jennifer, daughter Abigail and mother Jo know he was still alive, hoping to spare them the agony of losing him (yet again, as he has 'died' more than once). A caring orderly tried to see if he wanted anything to eat or drink and a delirious Jack was shocked to see that it was his brother Steve Johnson! Jack could not believe his eyes.

Steve believed himself to be a man by the name of Nick Stockton, but a DNA test proved otherwise. Intrigued by the possibilities, and driven by his brother's earnest pleadings that he return home, he convinced Jack to return home as well.

On the day of Jennifer's wedding to Frankie Brady, Steve and Jack arrived. Everyone was shocked when Jack interrupted the ceremony. Meanwhile, overwhelmed by the pain of returning to Salem where she had enjoyed such a short time of joy with Steve, Kayla was crying at Steve's graveside at the cemetery at the church, unable to sit through the wedding without breaking down.

Suddenly, Steve approached her from behind, asking her if she was okay. The shock of seeing her long lost love caused Kayla to faint, but when she awoke, her wildest dreams were confirmed: Steve has returned.

Kayla was overjoyed and has tried not to pressure Steve, who is clearly suffering from amnesia. He has shared the memories he does have, but continually tells Kayla he has no memory of her. Kayla and Steve have spent a lot of time together trying to stir up memories, she explained to him why the sky was blue and the meaning of e=mc2, but upon a visit to Cincinnati, Ohio - Nick Stockton's old stomping grounds - it appeared as though Steve was giving up on those missing memories and on Kayla. She returned to Salem, and Steve would almost immediately follow her. Steve's daughter Stephanie also proved to be a great draw for him, as the young woman joyfully welcomed her thought-dead father into her life.

Steve began to push Kayla away again, trying instead to make a love connection with Billie Reed whom he thought to be more like himself than the classy Dr. Kayla Brady. At the same time, his brother Jack made a complete recovery and left with wife and son to head up the London Spectator news office. Jack begged his brother to give his love with Kayla a chance, telling him that Kayla and Steve were meant to be together, which was full circle from the times he tried to tear them apart. Having no memories of his darker past with his brother, Steve was moved and affected by the younger man's words and outpouring of brotherly affection, but he still could not make the move towards a life with Kayla.

His daughter roundly scolded him for bringing Billie with him to watch her race (she races cars) and Steve blamed himself when Stephanie was critically injured during the race. Tearfully at her bedside, he had a flashback to holding her as a baby. He still doesn't remember Kayla, but now he remembers Stephanie and he's terrified of how much it hurts to love her, especially as she lies near deaths door.

Steve and Kayla were poisoned by a biotoxin a month later, in November 2006. Steve recovered, but Kayla, hovering near death, fell into a coma. Steve pretended to get his memory back (with the help of notes of his history with Kayla, provided by Bo and Hope) to give her the will to carry on; it worked, and Kayla woke up, weak but responsive. Before John and Marlena could get back from Canada with the antidote for Kayla, she flatlined, and Steve became hysterical; he lifted her up and gave her a long kiss, and miraculously, her heart started to beat again. John and Marlena got to the hospital, the antidote was administered, and Kayla began to recover.

After Kayla was released from the hospital, Steve remained by her side, but was distant; because of her fragile, still-recovering state, he was hesitant to tell her that his memory had not really returned. However, Kayla suspected the truth, as he was distant. To find out for certain, she asked Steve to take a trip with her to the bungalow where they had hid from Victor Kiriakis nearly two decades earlier; she wanted to 'test' his memory there. Steve, not knowing that Kayla suspected the truth, reluctantly agreed.

Once at the bungalow, Steve decided to tell Kayla the truth: his memory did not return— and he remembered a life with a separate family, a different wife and daughter. However, he cared about Kayla and he was just determined to keep Kayla alive, and wanted to give her the will to live. Heartbroken but strong, Kayla surprised Steve by telling him that she had already known that this was the case. She excused herself, going to another room to silently cry. Steve promptly fell asleep on the bed, and began to have flashes of memories and dreams of Kayla. Waking up in the middle of a dream, he thought that he and Kayla were on the run from Victor Kiriakis, something that had happened nearly 20 years prior. Entering the room Kayla was in, he frantically vowed to protect her, as Kayla, shocked, didn't understand what was going on. The flashes of memory became more intense, and Steve, with Kayla holding on to him in an attempt to snap him out of his erratic state, fell; catching his breath, he realized Kayla could be the love of his life, his memory had returned, telling Kayla tearfully, "I remember loving you!"

Kayla was skeptical, but Steve, at first, was oblivious; he was so overjoyed at having his memory back, trying to tell her every memory at once. He soon noticed that she was crying, and was shocked, asking her what was wrong. Kayla replied that she didn't know if she could believe that he had really gotten his memory back, especially not after how he had previously pretended to remember her. Horrified, Steve grabbed her and assured her that he, Steven Earl Johnson, her "one-eyed tomcat" was indeed back. Overcome, Kayla ran out of the bungalow, crying, with Steve chasing her. Coming back, she nearly fainted—still recovering from the biotoxin poisoning—and he caught her, holding her close and assuring her that everything would be fine.

After more desperate pleas from Steve to believe in him, and after he signed 'courage' to her as he did on their wedding day, Kayla relented; they reunited passionately.

Over the next year, 2007, Steve and Kayla would overcome the consequences of Steve's brainwashing by Stefano DiMera, who had used him as a pawn. Kayla deprogrammed him after several months of pain and terror.

That summer, Steve would act as a go-between for the DiMera family and the Bradys, as he attempted to discover what the DiMeras were up to by infiltrating their mansion as an undercover agent. Also around this time, Kayla began thinking about adopting a child so she and Steve could experience raising one together. Kayla was working at the hospital when she discovered an abandoned baby boy there, and instantly fell in love with him. With some convincing, Steve agreed that they would become the foster parents of the baby boy, nicknamed "Pocket" by Kayla. After a couple of months, however, Pocket began getting sick, and had to be hospitalized. During this time, Philip Kiriakis discovered he had a son, an in-vitro baby with Mimi Lockhart. Steve, Kayla, and Philip all learned that Pocket was really Philip and Mimi's son, whose real name was Tyler, and who had been abandoned by the surrogate who gave birth to him. In the end, a young couple who had been caring for the baby after he was taken away from Steve and Kayla expressed a desire to adopt him, and Steve and Kayla, though heartbroken to lose the little boy, agreed that the child would be well off with the adoptive parents, as did Philip.

Steve and Kayla then had to deal with the rape of their daughter, Stephanie, by Ford Decker, who afterwards died in an accidental fall.

In February 2008, Kayla learned that she was pregnant with the couple's second child.

On May 16, 2008, in an emotionally charged episode, Kayla gave birth to her and Steve's baby boy, who arrived three months prematurely, and was not breathing at birth; he was immediately transported to the NICU of Salem University Hospital. Devastated yet hopeful, his parents are now dealing with the aftermath. The baby boy has been named Joseph, to be known as 'Joe' Johnson.

=== Impact ===
Steve and Kayla were part of a growing "supercouple" phenomenon on Days of our Lives, largely starting after Luke Spencer and Laura Webber from General Hospital took the daytime world by storm and enthralled viewers with their adventurous and romantic storylines. Steve and Kayla were a classic good girl/bad boy story, with Steve battling his inner demons, stemming from the resentment he felt at being left to live in an orphanage, his abusive parents, and his general disdain for any type of romantic relationship. In contrast, Kayla had been raised in a happy, content family, and grew up with loving parents and siblings. At times, Steve felt it impossible for them to really have anything in common. However, the show stuck by the couple and their pairing was and remains one of the most successful partnerships in DAYS history. They were ranked number 19 on the We Love Soaps list of 50 greatest soap opera couples of all time.

In addition to being popular with viewers, Steve and Kayla were also featured regularly in soap opera magazines, appearing on numerous Soap Opera Digest covers, and also appearing in the now-defunct magazines Daytime Television and Soap Opera Update. Their wedding in 1988, occurring over the course of two episodes, caused Days of Our Lives to go to number one in the ratings, something that had not happened for 14 years. They were honored with many accolades, including an honor bestowed by Soap Opera Digest, Favorite Couple, in 1989. Stephen Nichols has also received Best Actor honors from Soap Opera Digest. In the Best & Worst 1988 issue, they were singled out as having the best wedding. Nichols was also nominated for a Daytime Emmy in 1988.

Many fellow actors and co-stars have praised the magic of their partnership, with one writer from Soap Opera Update quoting that "There was Bogie and Bacall, Tracy and Hepburn, and Scarlett and Rhett. Then there was Patch and Kayla."

== Analysis ==
In the book No End to Her, Martha Nochimson notes that the Patch/Kayla storyline reverses the usual male-focused narrative of the Beauty and the Beast story:

The Beast in fact goes through some specific change, the root of which is Persephone's transformative encounter with Hades, not Oedipus's destructive encounter with his mother. In Kayla's version of the tale, the symbolic change is a change in his name. Patch drops his nickname, which emphasizes his mutilation, and resumes his birthname, Steve Johnson. Steve's resumption of his original name suggests that he no longer feels alien to the human community because of his missing eye -- rather an interesting reversal on the Freudian relationship between the love of women and mutilation. Kayla helps Steve to a sense of his wholeness by creating her own strong feminine identity through a series of encounters with the Oedipal dyad, beginning with her intervention in the Patch-Kiriakis alliance.

== See also ==
- List of supercouples
