= Abigail Deveraux =

Fictional character

- Days of Our Lives character
- Marci Miller as Abigail Deveraux
- Portrayed by: Meghan and Michael Nelson (1992–1994); Paige and Ryanne Kettner (1994–2001); Megan Corletto (2001–2003); Jillian Clare (2003–2004); Ashley Benson (2004–2007); Emily Montague (2007); Kate Mansi (2011–2016, 2018–2020); Marci Miller (2016–2018, 2020–2022)
- Duration: 1992–1998; 2000–2007; 2011–2022
- First appearance: October 19, 1992
- Last appearance: December 23, 2022
- Created by: Sheri Anderson
- Introduced by: Ken Corday and Tom Langan (1992, 2000); Ken Corday and Gary Tomlin (2011); Ken Corday, Albert Alarr and Greg Meng (2016)
- Spin-off appearances: Chad and Abby in Paris (2019)
In-universe information
- Other names: Abigail DiMera; Abigail Hernandez; Abigail Johanna Deveraux; Gabby and Dr. Laura (alternate personalities)
- Occupation: Head of Public Relations for DiMera Enterprises; Police Department receptionist (2017); Public Relations assistant; Model; Student assistant; Medical intern; Waitress
- Father: Jack Deveraux
- Mother: Jennifer Horton
- Brothers: JJ Deveraux
- Half-sisters: Gwen Rizczech
- Spouse: Chad DiMera (2016–2022) (Note: Abigail and Chad DiMera were married three times: 2016–2017, 2017–2018, and 2019–2022.); Dario Hernandez (2017); Stefan DiMera (2018)
- Children: Thomas DiMera; Charlotte DiMera
- Grandparents: Duke Johnson; Jo Johnson; Harper Deveraux (adoptive); Camille Deveraux (adoptive); Bill Horton; Laura Horton
- Aunts and uncles: Steve Johnson; Adrienne Johnson Kiriakis; Mike Horton; Lucas Horton
- First cousins: Jeremy Horton; Stephanie Johnson; Will Horton; Sonny Kiriakis; Allie Horton; Joey Johnson; Tripp Dalton; Joey Kiriakis (adoptive); Victor Kiriakis II (adoptive)
- Other relatives: Tom Horton; Alice Horton

Abigail Deveraux is a fictional character from Days of Our Lives, an American soap opera on the NBC network. Abigail was created by scriptwriter Sheri Anderson and executive producer Ken Corday. Abigail's storylines often focus on young love and budding romances. She is a member of the high class, core family, the Hortons. She is also the daughter of popular super couple Jack Deveraux and Jennifer Horton. Abigail was often titularized as the show's younger leading heroine when the character was portrayed by Ashley Benson, and is known for her popular fan pairing with Max Brady, which spanned from 2005 to 2007, when her character left for the United Kingdom to be with her parents. The character returned to the series in March 2011, then portrayed by Kate Mansi, but departed in June 2016. Marci Miller stepped into the role from November 2016 to November 2018. Following Miller's exit, Mansi returned to the role from November 2018 to February 2019. Mansi then appeared as Abigail that August in the spin-off, Chad and Abby in Paris, and then on the main show from November 2019 to May 2020. In September 2020, Miller returned to the role, until Abigail was killed off in July 2022.

Both Mansi and Miller's performances have been met with favorable reception from audiences and critics. Mansi won the Daytime Emmy Award for Outstanding Supporting Actress in a Drama Series for her portrayal of Abigail in 2017, and received a nomination in the Outstanding Guest Performer in a Drama Series category in 2019. Miller's portrayal later earned her three Daytime Emmy Award nominations for Outstanding Lead Actress in a Drama Series in 2018, 2019 and 2022.

== Casting ==
The faces of Abigail Deveraux
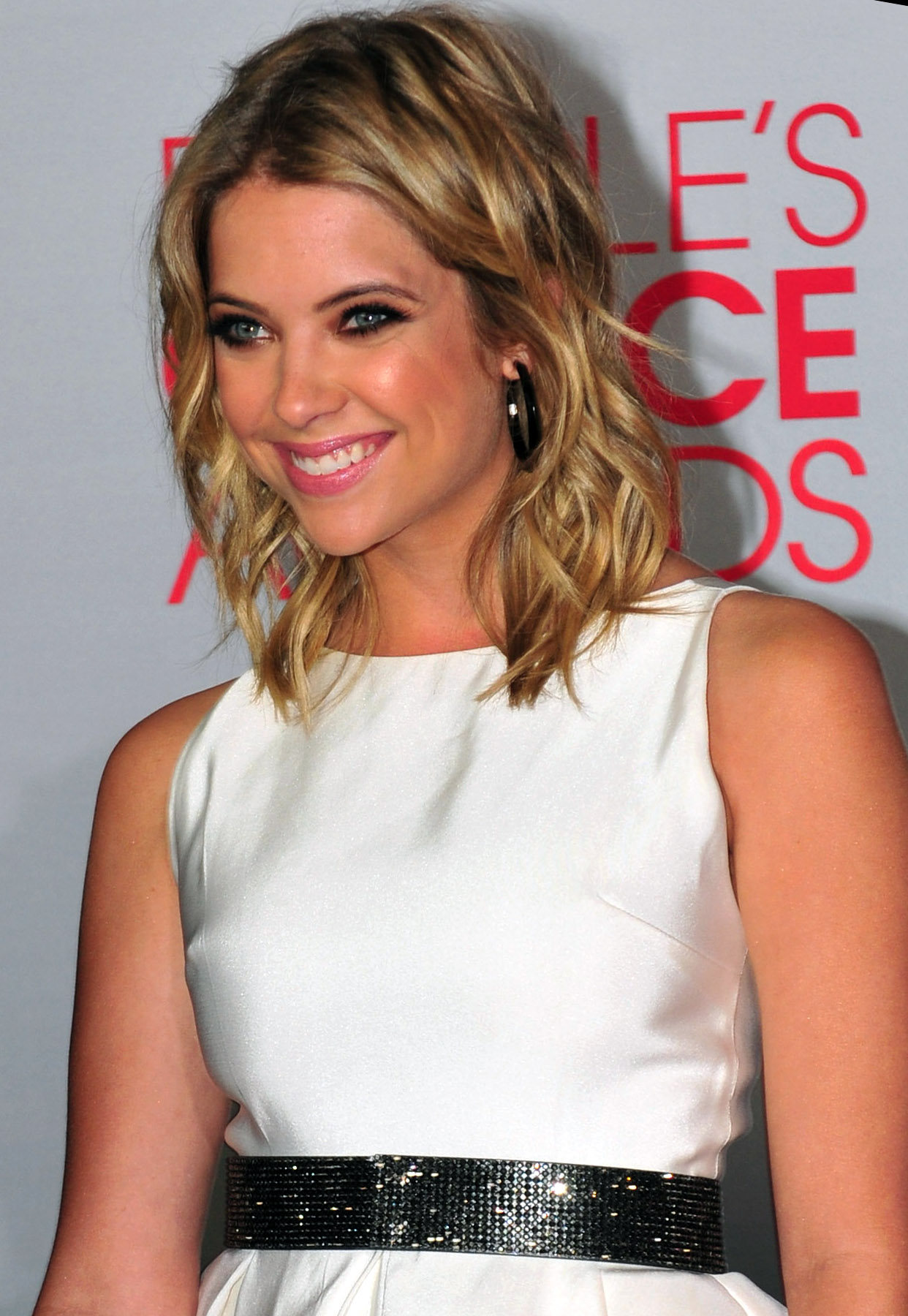
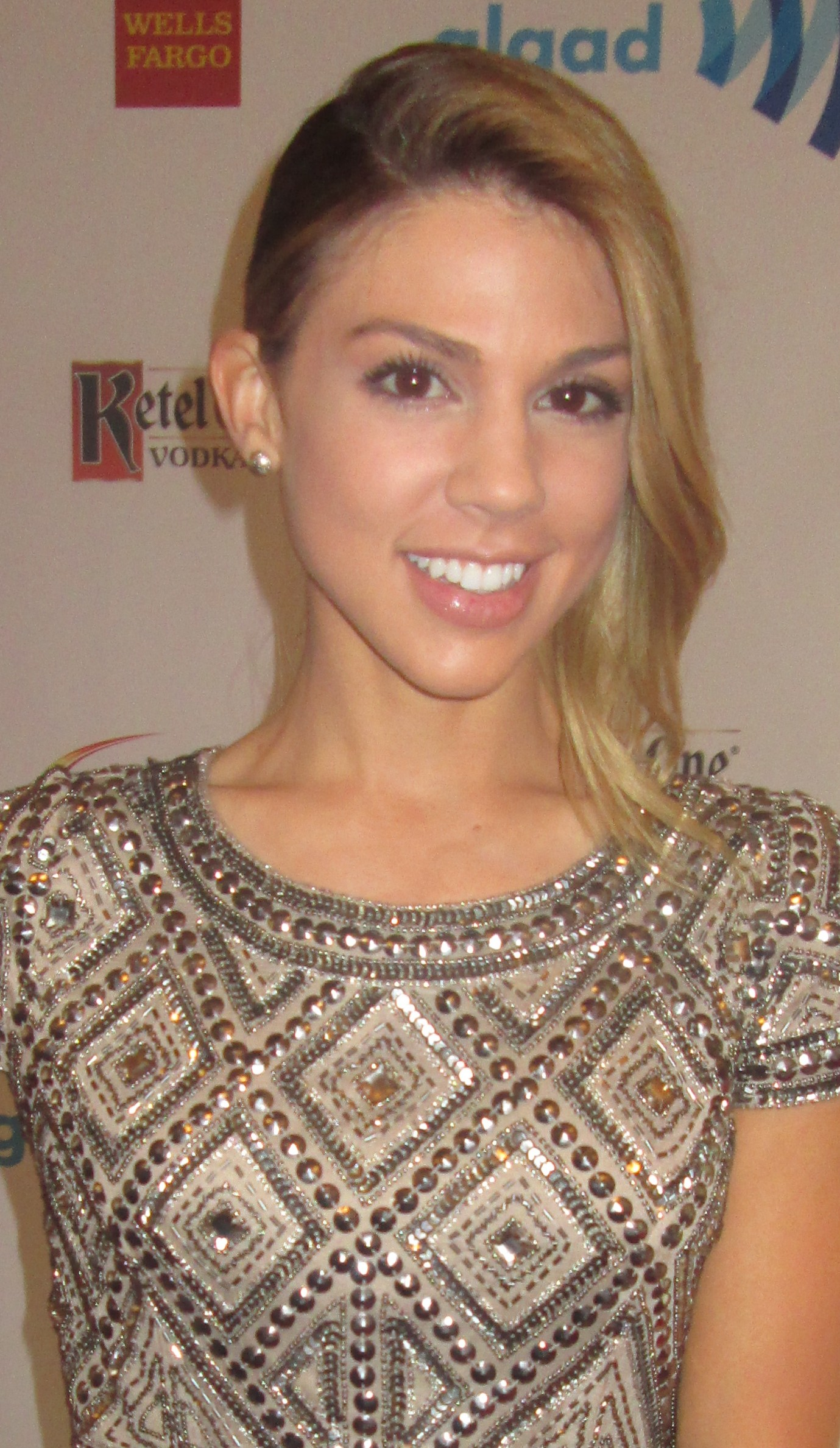
Actress Ashley Benson (left) was cast as Abigail in 2004 and departed the role in 2007. Kate Mansi (right) was cast as Benson's successor in the role of Abigail from 2011 to 2016; she reprised the role from 2018 to 2020.

The role was originated by Meghan and Michael Nelson on October 19, 1992, who shared the role until December 8, 1994. Paige and Ryanne Kettner took over on December 20, 1994, until June 5, 1998, however they returned on October 13, 2000, and last appeared on January 2, 2001. Megan Corletto portrayed the role of Abigail from January 31, 2001, and remained until May 27, 2003. She was replaced by Jillian Clare from August 28, 2003, to June 24, 2004.

On October 31, 2004, it was announced that the character would be recast and rapidly aged to a teenager with fifteen-year-old actress Ashley Benson signed on to appear as Abby, she first appeared on November 12, 2004. Benson remained with the show for three years until her departure from the soap on May 2, 2007. Actress Emily Montague briefly played Abby for three episodes from April 2 to 4, 2007.

In December 2010, it was reported that the character of Abby would be brought back to the canvas with newcomer Kate Mansi assuming the role. Mansi first aired on March 2, 2011.

In January 2016, it was revealed that Mansi would exit the show; she last appeared on June 24, 2016. In June 2016, Soap Opera Digest broke the news that newcomer Marci Miller had been cast as Abigail. In the November 14, 2016, issue of Soap Opera Digest, it was confirmed that Miller would make her first appearance as Abigail on November 10, 2016.

In May 2018, Daytime Confidential reported that Miller would depart the serial. Soap Opera Digest later announced Miller's exiting, citing her decision to not renew her deal with the soap, and announced that Mansi would reprise the role for a "short-term" period of time. Miller made her final appearance on November 19, 2018. Mansi made her return in the role during the November 29, 2018, episode. Mansi departed on February 21, 2019. Mansi then appeared as Abigail in the spin-off, Chad and Abby in Paris.

On May 5, 2019, it was announced that Mansi would again reprise the role of Abigail on the main show. Mansi returned on November 11, 2019, and exited on May 27, 2020. The following month, it was announced that Miller would reprise the role; she returned during the September 4, 2020, episode. Miller took maternity leave for several months in 2021.

== Development ==
In January 2011, Soap Opera Digest reported that Abigail would be Chad DiMera's new love interest. Deidrick said he immediately connected to Mansi during her screen test. Throughout the spring of 2011, the head writers teased a relationship between the two, however Abigail was "turned off" because Chad is a DiMera, before realizing he isn't like his family. In an interview with TV Source Magazine from 2011, Mansi compared Chad and Abigail's dynamic to Romeo and Juliet. The duo shared an "instant attraction" but she distances herself because he is a DiMera knowing her mother Jennifer Horton (Melissa Reeves) does not approve. Mansi revealed that Stefano and Kate would also interfere in the romance forcing Chad and Abigail to "fight for their relationship," which makes them stronger. The onscreen pairing of Chad and Abigail became very popular among fans and garnered the squish name, "Chabby". Jamey Giddens enjoyed Abigail and Chad's new dynamic displayed in their snooping around Cameron. Giddens said that while he wasn't a fan of their initial romance, "Abby and Chad's scenes were fun, and made me wish I could see more."

== Storylines ==
=== 1992–1998, 2000–2007 ===
Introduced in 1992, Abigail Johanna Deveraux is the oldest child of supercouple Jack Deveraux (Matthew Ashford) and Jennifer Horton (Melissa Reeves). She is born in the Horton cabin, with her own father delivering her. While her parents' car went off the road Jennifer goes into labor. She is named after Alice Horton's mother Abigail Johanna.

When Abby is 8 months old, she comes down with aplastic anemia as the result of polluted well water. A bone marrow donation from Austin Reed saves her life. Her father then discovers that he is responsible for the toxic dumping which had happened years earlier when his own father used him to sign papers. Jack is traumatized with guilt and leaves town because he thought Jennifer and Abby would be better off without him. Years later, he returns and the entire Deveraux family goes to live in Africa for a few years.

Abby's international upbringing also includes Ireland, where she and her mother live before returning to Salem in 2000. When her father returns to town, Abby hopes her estranged parents will reunite, but her mom has other ideas. Eventually her parents make their way back to each other and remarry. When Jack was hit on the head by the Salem Stalker, he was rendered brain dead. Jennifer made the heart-wrenching decision to turn off his life support. It was a decision that Abby couldn't forgive her for.

After Jack's death, Jennifer finds out she was pregnant. Months later, she starts receiving messages from Jack via her cell phone. This leads her to the island Melaswen where all the presumed dead victims of the Salem Stalker are. While on the island, Jennifer gives birth to Jack, Jr., Abby's brother. Jack, Jennifer and their newborn son are briefly reunited until Jack is presumed dead once again by drowning while trying to escape. In reality, he has been kidnapped again.

Months later, Jack makes his way back to Salem. The Deveraux family are finally reunited on Abby's 16th birthday. Abby begins spending a lot of time with her best friend Chelsea Benson, who starts dating Max Brady. Abby begins dating a guy named Josh. Jack gets trapped behind a door and has to watch them kissing.

Sadly, Jack becomes terminally ill shortly after his return but dies when his car crashes into a river and his body is never found. Jennifer and Frankie Brady begin seeing each other which upsets Abby, especially when she walks in on them making love in her parents' room. Abby even begins considering sleeping with Josh, even though she had always planned to wait until marriage. At a Pier Party with Chelsea and Max, Josh asks Abby to be exclusive and Abby tells Chelsea she is going to sleep with him first and then decide, but when things start to get hot, Abby gets a phone call and has to go. Little did both girls know that pictures of them kissing their boyfriends were taken by website owners and posted online which Frankie and Jennifer end up finding. Josh goes off screen later when Abby develops feelings for Max and his disappearance is never explained.

In 2006, during Jennifer's wedding to Frankie, Jack returns from being presumed dead with his presumed-dead amnesiac brother, Steve Johnson. After receiving a successful experimental treatment for his illness, Jack is finally cured and able to return to his life. Jack, Jennifer and Jack, Jr. soon leave for London to run the Spectator newspaper office. Abigail remains in Salem at the university studying business.

Abby soon begins working as an assistant at Max's garage, helping with paperwork and generally keeping the garage in order. Abby soon develops a crush on Max and begins displaying jealous feelings towards Max's relationship with Mimi Lockhart. When Mimi leaves town, Max is available again. Max soon admits his crush on Abby, and the two start dating, but only briefly. Abby's aunt, Maggie Horton, and Jack push her to not go out with Max. When Max tells Abby that he wants to stay friends and not pursue a relationship with her, she gets in a fight with him and leaves Salem to spend the summer with her family in London and doesn't return.

=== 2011–2022 ===
In March 2011, Abigail surprises her mother when she returns to Salem and expresses her dismay for her father Jack's absence. She tries to talk Jennifer into moving on without Jack and encourages her to pursue a relationship with Dr. Daniel Jonas, the surgeon who saved her life. Abby is instantly attracted to Stefano DiMera's youngest son Chad DiMera and realizes she should keep her distance. Chad comforts Abby when she learns that her mother is divorcing her father and admits she wishes her parents were still together. They soon begin dating, but Chad's step-mother, Kate DiMera starts plotting to break them up, but that plan quickly falls apart when Chad gets shot and 'disowns' his heritage.

In September 2011, Jack returns to Salem. It turns out he was secretly on an assignment as a reporter in Afghanistan and was taken hostage for over a year. Abby reacts in extreme anger when her father returns, after learning he lied again, and has a brief estrangement from him but eventually they reconcile. Later, Abby's relationship with Chad falls apart when he develops feelings for her best friend, Melanie Jonas and Abby secretly develops feelings for a married man, Austin Reed. One drunken night Austin and Abby kiss and when Austin wakes in the morning he is full of regret, thinking that he had slept with Abigail. He tries to cover it up to keep it from his wife Carrie Brady. What he doesn't know is that he and Abby never actually slept together, but Abby lets him think that to try to keep him. Austin continues to push her away in an attempt to rekindle his failing marriage. Realizing how much she is hurting Austin, Abigail comes clean revealing that she lied about sleeping with him. Abigail then begins to build a connection with Lexie Carver's half-brother, Cameron Davis, a doctor at the University of Salem. The two begin a flirtation that soon turns to a relationship. Her relationship with her father improves as well. He works with Marlena Evans and a support group to recover from PTSD and so, Jack eventually manages to open up to Abigail about it and she soon forgives him. After Jack dies, Abigail begins to fall apart, asking Cameron to sleep with her, though she would always turn him down. Due to Abby's grief and mixed feelings, Cameron breaks up with her and starts seeing other girls, much to Abby's chagrin.

Later, Abby begins bonding with Chad again, and their feelings are rekindled. They spend New Year's Eve together and, ironically, a year after they break up, they end up sharing a few kisses, and decide to get closer. Abby also becomes Gabi Hernandez's maid-of-honor in her wedding to Abby's cousin, Nick Fallon. When Chad ruins the wedding (which he attends as Abby's date) by revealing that Nick is not the father of Will Horton's baby Arianna, Abigail then tells Chad she is done with him. They then reconcile and on September 17, Chad and Abigail make love for the first time, resulting in Abigail no longer being a virgin. After Chad leaves town with Stefano to recover from the shooting, Abigail begins having sex with Chad's older brother EJ DiMera. She then has a pregnancy scare which turns out to be a stomach bug. Abigail is mentioned by Will to be one of Arianna's godparents, along with Sonny Kiriakis. After Sami Brady learns of Abigail's affair with EJ, Sami plots revenge on both of them and continues to torture Abigail. In September 2014, Chad returns to Salem and immediately places anger towards Abigail over her affair with EJ. In June 2015, Abigail sleeps with Chad, despite being in a committed relationship with Ben. Later, believing herself to be pregnant due to morning sickness, she takes an at-home pregnancy test, which returns a positive result. As she has just slept with Chad, she is unsure if the father is Chad or Ben. She gets Kayla to secretly perform a paternity test, which reveals that Ben is the father after Ben's father Clyde Weston threatens the paternity doctor. When Chad is accused of murdering Serena Mason and Paige Larson Abigail sticks up for him even though Ben believes Chad is the killer because Chad has no memory of the nights the girls were murdered. Abigail's cousin Will Horton is murdered and Abigail still believes Chad is innocent. It is soon revealed that Ben is the killer and before leaving for Hope Williams Brady's wedding to Aiden Jennings, Abigail realizes the truth. She tries to get Ben to call an anonymous hotline or talk to Marlena Evans, but Ben, psychotically jealous, takes Abigail to a cabin in the middle of nowhere. Abigail's mother tries to contact her and realizing that he left Abigail's phone at the apartment, Ben goes back to get it. While he's gone, Abigail picks the handcuff she's locked to and tries to escape, but Ben arrives just as she's leaving. He locks her up once again and leaves for a second time to get some things. While he's gone, Abigail has labor pains but they soon wear off. Upon his return, he tells Abigail to call Chad and tell him she's done with him; she does so and, instantly realizing something is wrong, Chad tells Abigail to say goodbye and hang up immediately to signal if something is wrong and she does exactly so. Abigail goes into early labor and gives birth to her son with the help of a midwife, but Ben kills the midwife after the birth. Chad arrives and Ben ties them to the bed and sets it on fire before leaving with the baby. However, they escape and Ben is found and arrested. Eventually, Ben is put in jail and Abigail is reunited with her son after JJ and Chad find him abandoned in a motel. She renames her son Thomas Jack Deveraux. Afterward, Abigail and Chad start to plan a future together. After being brainwashed to do his family's bidding, Chad cruelly breaks up with Abigail. After Thomas gets sick, it's revealed that Chad is his father, not Ben. In March 2016, Abigail marries Chad in a ceremony hosted at the DiMera mansion.

At this time, Abigail begins to believe she is seeing hallucinations of Ben; in an attempt to confront her fears, she sets traps to see if she can catch him. When confronted by Ben, Abigail begins to question her own sanity and in a stint of absent-mindedness, she ties up and tortures Ben. As a result, Chad commits her Shady Hills psych ward; while there, she continues to be threatened by hallucinations of Ben. Becoming overwhelmed, she withdraws herself from her family, and event breaks out of Shady Hills. Soon after, it is revealed that while on the run, Abigail died in a plane wreck.

In November 2016, Abigail returns to Salem and is spying on her loved ones, including Chad. After sneaking into the DiMera mansion to return Thomas' teddy bear, she is approached by Andre, who reveals that he helped Abigail leave Salem and teamed up with Laura to help keep her safe and that she had returned to Salem against their suggestion. At first, she wasn't going to reveal herself to Chad, who had developed feelings for her best friend Gabi Hernandez. Abigail and Chad reconcile, however, but shortly thereafter Chad and Gabi are locked in a meat locker by Deimos Kiriakis and Chad tells Gabi he loves her. Abigail, with the help of Gabi's brother Dario Hernandez, who has developed feelings for Abigail himself, rescues them. Chad tells Abigail that he still has feelings for Gabi, but that he loves her and Thomas and wants to keep his marriage and family. He eventually decides he must remove Gabi from his life entirely. The day that Chad decides to tell Gabi this, Deimos kidnaps Abigail and Gabi and poisons them both and gives Chad only enough antidote to save one of the women, forcing him to choose which woman would live and which would die. Chad, however, gives half of the antidote to each one, saving both of their lives, however, Gabi remains in a coma.

Abby later realizes that Chad and Gabi used to play baseball together, and believes that Chad only saved her first because he knew that Gabi would catch the vial. She breaks up with Chad and marries Dario after he lies to her about the need to marry, so he won't be deported. Abby finds out that Dario is stealing money from DiMera Enterprises, and wants to leave him, but Dario blackmails Abby into staying married to him by showing her a photo that implicates Chad in Deimos' murder. Abby turns to Andrè for help, and he has Theo steal Dario's laptop, so he can delete the photo.

Dario forces Abby to leave town with him, but Chad goes to confront them, and Abby is hit by car aimed for Dario when she pushes Chad out of the way. Chad and Abby reconcile and plan to remarry in a double wedding with Sonny and Paul, but they're interrupted by Ben, who announces that Will is alive. Chad and Abby later remarry in a private ceremony with Andrè and Jennifer in attendance. Abby realizes Andrè has feelings for Kate and encourages him to come clean to her. Chad and Abby's New Year's Eve party is crashed by Vivian Alamain and her long-lost son with Stefano, Stefan. Stefan seizes control of DiMera by getting the board to appoint him as CEO, and Abby conspires with Chad to have him removed, but Stefan develops a crush on Abby.

Abby finds Andrè's dead body after learning from Gabi that Andrè stole her company from her. Security footage shows a woman that resembles Gabi from the back is seen leaving Andrè's office with the lid to the murder weapon. Abby has a hard time dealing with Andrè's death and Stefan discovers Abby has dissociative identity disorder after meeting Abby's alter, Gabby. Gabby later tries to attack Vivian with a fire poker, and Stefan convinces her to give him her coat and the lid. After Stefan helps Gabby come to terms with the fact that she isn't the real Gabi Hernandez, another alter, named Dr. Laura, emerged. Dr. Laura tells Stefan that Abby killed Andrè.

In September 2020, Abigail returns to Salem until she was later killed off in 2022.

== Reception ==
In 2020, Charlie Mason from Soaps She Knows placed Abigail at #21 on their list of the 35 most memorable characters from Days of Our Lives, saying that "Even if it hadn't been for that whole murdering-André thing, Kate Mansi and Marci Miller's character was always bound to develop a split personality: She is, after all, the offspring of a saint (No. 27 [Jennifer]) and, however repentant, a born sinner (No. 29 [Jack])."

== See also ==
- Supercouple
