= Jack Deveraux =

Fictional character from the soap opera Days of Our Lives

- Days of Our Lives character
- Matthew Ashford as Jack Deveraux
- Portrayed by: Joseph Adams (1987); James Acheson (1987); Matthew Ashford (1987–1993, 2001–present); Mark Valley (1994–1997); Steve Wilder (1997–1998); Jon Lindstrom (2020)
- Duration: 1987–1998; 2001–2007; 2011–2012; 2016–present
- First appearance: April 10, 1987
- Created by: Leah Laiman
- Introduced by: Betty Corday, Ken Corday and Al Rabin
- Spin-off appearances: Days of Our Lives: One Stormy Night (1992); Days of Our Lives: Night Sins (1993); Chad and Abby in Paris (2019)
In-universe information
- Other names: William Earl Johnson; Clark; Jack Harcourt Deveraux
- Occupation: Journalism professor; Journalist; Television personality; Newspaper owner; Politician Mayor of Salem
- Parents: Duke Johnson; Jo Johnson
- Adoptive parents: Harper Deveraux; Camilla Deveraux
- Brothers: Steve Johnson
- Sisters: Adrienne Johnson Kiriakis
- Wife: Kayla Brady (1987–1988); Eve Donovan (1991, 2019); Jennifer Horton (1991–1993, 2003–2011, 2019–present)
- Children: Gwen Rizczech; Abigail Deveraux; JJ Deveraux
- Grandsons: Thomas DiMera
- Granddaughters: Charlotte DiMera
- Uncles: Earl Duke Johnson
- Nieces and nephews: Stephanie Johnson; Joey Johnson; Tripp Dalton; Victor Kiriakis II (adoptive); Joey Kiriakis (adoptive); Sonny Kiriakis

Jack Deveraux is a fictional character from Days of Our Lives, an American soap opera on the NBC network, most famously played by Matthew Ashford since 1987. He is a member of the Johnson family and first appeared in 1987. Ashford is the third actor to play in the role, and appeared regularly from 1987 through 1993 and from 2001 to 2006, with a few minor breaks in between, in addition to a small guest stint in 2007. In September 2011, after a four-year absence, the character returned to reconnect with his estranged family. His return was short-lived when it was announced that Ashford had been let go, last appearing on August 15, 2012, when the character was killed off in an elevator shaft. From 2016 to 2017, Ashford reprised the role for several guest-appearances; he returned full-time on December 28, 2018. The character has also been portrayed for lesser stints by Mark Valley, Steve Wilder, and Jon Lindstrom.

Many of his storylines have included his relationship with Jennifer Horton, which has made up one of the soap's most popular supercouples. They have two children together, Abigail Deveraux and JJ Deveraux, in addition to a grandson, Thomas DiMera and a granddaughter Charlotte DiMera, through Abigail. He recently discovered to have another daughter, Gwen Rizczech. One of the character's well known plots have been his fake deaths which occurred between 2003 and 2012, where he was presumed dead four times.

== Casting ==
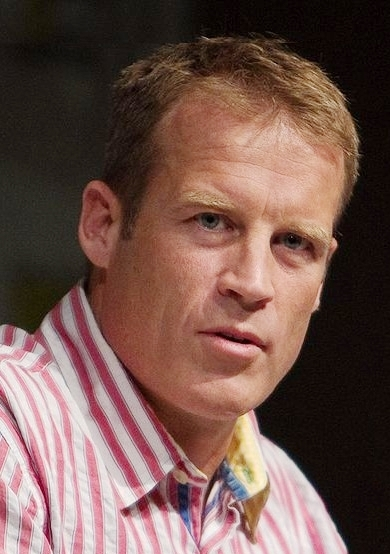
Mark Valley portrayed the role of Jack from 1994 to 1997.

At the character's inception in 1987, the role was played by Joseph Adams from April 10 to July 17, by James Acheson from July 21 to October 26, and by Matthew Ashford from October 30 onward. Ashford went on to play the role through October 29, 1993, reappearing from February 5, 2001, to October 27, 2003, and June 22, 2004, until September 21, 2006, with a guest appearance on April 2–4, 2007, and again from September 23, 2011, until August 15, 2012. Ashford later took a brief absence from the series from October 2003 to June 2004 where he would appear as a special guest star on One Life to Live.

Ashford was nominated for an Emmy for Outstanding Supporting Actor in 2012. During Ashford's absence, the role of Jack was played by Mark Valley from October 28, 1994, until September 26, 1997, and by Steve Wilder from September 26, 1997, through June 5, 1998.

On November 30, 2015, it was announced that Ashford would briefly return to the soap; he appeared on May 24, 2016. Ashford also briefly appeared on June 20, 2016, August 5, 2016, and August 23, 2016. He made another on-off appearance on December 21, 2017. Ashford returned full-time at the conclusion of the December 28, 2018, episode.

On December 30, 2020, Jon Lindstrom stepped in as Ashford's body double for scenes with Cady McClain's Jennifer. At the time, Lindstrom was married to McClain in real life.

== Characterization ==
Jack Deveraux, one half of Jack and Jennifer, is an anti-hero who can be both charming and manipulative. He entered the story as a villain who wedged himself between another supercouple, Steve Johnson and Kayla Brady. Jack later became a core main character in the Days mythos through his passion, sense of humor, redemption, and love for heroine Jennifer Horton.

The character has been a frequent winner of Soap Opera Digest Awards including Outstanding Villain, Outstanding Comic Performance, and multiple wins with Jennifer: Best Love Story, Outstanding Supercouple, and Best Wedding. Ashford was also nominated for an Emmy for Outstanding Supporting Actor in 2012.

== Storylines ==
=== 1987-1988 ===
When Jack came to Salem, he was hoping to reconnect with Kayla Brady, the woman he'd met a couple of years prior in Hawaii and couldn't get out of his mind. He had Hodgkin's disease, but he was in denial about its severity, and actually tried to hide the symptoms plaguing him. However, that couldn't last long. Once he was hospitalized because he was no longer in remission, his father, wealthy Senator Harper Deveraux, hired Kayla to be Jack's nurse. Jack let Kayla know he loved her, and he told her that her love gave him the will to live. Thus, when Steve "Patch" Johnson rejected Kayla, he pushed her towards Jack (his birth brother Billy, unbeknownst to Jack), and she agreed to marry him. Sure enough, Jack went into remission and recuperated fully.

Jack and Kayla's marriage was doomed from the start. Almost immediately, Harper began poisoning Kayla because he mistakenly thought she knew Jack was adopted. Steve discovered Kayla was ill, and he kidnapped her to get her out of danger. As he nursed her back to health, they resumed their relationship. Kayla wanted to divorce Jack right away. However, Steve convinced Kayla that since Jack was running for assemblyman, she should wait until after his election to break the news. Kayla therefore reluctantly returned to Jack and played the loving wife even as she avoided his bed. Before her kidnapping, their marriage had remained unconsummated due to first his illness, then hers. Now that she was back, Kayla meant to keep their marriage chaste until the divorce. Unaware of her plans, Jack accepted her nightly excuses that she was not yet ready to have sex, believing she just needed time. Meanwhile, Kayla was seeing Steve secretly at every opportunity.

On the night of Jack's election to assemblyman, a reporter handed Jack compromising photos of Steve and Kayla, hoping to blackmail him; finally, Jack realized Kayla was having an affair. He returned to the loft and raped her. A confrontation between Jack and Steve on the roof of Kayla's loft resulted in Jack falling multiple stories, and Jack's near-fatal injuries resulted in him needing a new kidney. Unfortunately, the best viable donor was his brother Steve. His mother Jo asked him to donate in order to save "Billy's" life, but Steve was conflicted; he finally came to the decision to donate after visiting Jack in the hospital and remembering the promise he'd made as a child to protect his little brother. After Jack recovered, Kayla pressed charges, but in the end, Jack pled guilty to the lesser charge of assault. She then filed for divorce.

Jack had been turning to Melissa Horton; she'd always had a crush on him, and Jack had no idea that Harper had tried to frame her for poisoning Kayla. He found out from Melissa, to his shock and horror, that he was adopted. He was furious at Harper, whom he temporarily turned his back on; after all those years talking about the importance of "Deveraux blood," Harper had actually been sterile. To add insult to injury, he discovered that his birth family was the Johnsons: Jo, whom he'd known as the kindly maid; Adrienne; and Steve, Jack's greatest enemy (in his mind). He initially rejected his birth identity as "William Earl Johnson" whole-heartedly, and told Jo and the Johnsons he wanted nothing to do with his birth family. It was a long, slow, painful process for him to accept his "new" family, but he eventually did.

After Harper was arrested for being the serial killer known as The Riverfront Knifer, Jack ran for Harper's now-vacant senate seat against Mickey Horton. Jack's romance with Mickey's daughter Melissa had progressed physically, but he didn't really love her as more than a friend. Still, he proposed to her because marrying her would be politically useful. After discovering his motives, Melissa left him at the altar in spectacular fashion the day before the election.

With only a few people left willing to give Jack the time of day (essentially Jo, Adrienne, and his stepmother Anjelica), Jack reconciled with Harper. Harper manipulated Jack into helping him break out of prison by pretending he was being beaten by fellow inmates. Jack enlisted Victor Kiriakis' help; he had no idea how to pull off an operation like that. Kiriakis hired some goons who turned out to be less than effective. The plan went bad when Harper was shot, and his goons kidnapped Kayla to tend to a wounded Harper while they attempted to get him out of the country. Steve saved her, and Jack's father went back to jail.

=== 1989-1991 ===
Adrift and depressed, Jack bought 51% of the newspaper The Spectator in order to stop them from running a humiliating expose about his failed campaign against Mickey Horton. While initially the purchase was a move borne out of desperation, he threw himself into running it, much to the chagrin of his partner and the original owner Diana Colville. She was constantly pushing back. He eventually attempted to blackmail her into selling him her 49% of the paper, but she entrusted it to editor Vern Scofield instead. In time, Jack earned ownership of the paper honestly.

It was at The Spectator that Jack met college journalism student Jennifer Horton. She soon became his protege, but her compassionate perspective would often temper his cynicism when they were working together. She was one of the only people who believed that he wanted to change and who was willing to not only give him a chance, but to help him. The more they were together, the more their connection intensified. Jennifer decided to aggressively pursue a relationship with him. Although Jack had fallen deeply in love with her, he resisted her advances, viewing himself as unworthy.

Jennifer’s ex-boyfriend Emilio Ramirez returned to town, determined to win her back. Emilio was aided by Melissa Horton, who returned shortly after he did. She still loathed Jack and didn't believe he had changed his ways, so she did her best to push Jennifer towards Emilio. Instead of fighting for Jennifer, Jack denied his feelings and pushed her away, convinced he would be toxic for her.

Still, even as Jack claimed he was not interested in Jennifer, his actions spoke for him; he couldn’t stop himself from interfering in her relationship with Emilio or from responding to her. He even went so far as to kidnap Jennifer on her wedding day to Emilio. He took her to a cabin outside of town in a fire engine; there, she expected him to declare his love. Instead, he told her he'd simply brought her out there so she could rethink her decision. Jennifer was infuriated, but Jack wasn't ready to be honest about his feelings yet.

Another major plotline involved the Toscanos. Steve’s ex-wife Marina Toscano was driving a wedge between Steve and Kayla by blackmailing Steve into helping her find the key to her family’s “treasure.” Jack was desperate to help Steve and Kayla in any way he could because now that he was interested in changing, he knew that he had to do something to make amends for his biggest sin: raping Kayla. He discovered that Marina had a sister named Isabella stashed in Bayview Sanitarium who was actually quite sane, and he broke her out. After finding the key to the treasure with Jennifer and helping rescue Kayla, he quietly figured out the treasure's location alone and discovered that the "treasure" was the diary of Isabella's mother. Its immense value came from the fact that it contained the secret to Isabella's paternity: her father was not Ernesto Toscano, whom she believed to be dead, but Victor Kiriakis, a man she was raised to hate. Before giving Isabella the diary, Jack removed the pages detailing the secret.

Meanwhile, the actually very much alive Ernesto Toscano was planning a "cruise of deception" to get revenge on his enemies in secret. He wanted the incriminating pages of that diary badly, and he discovered they were in Jack's possession. He invited both Jack and Jennifer on the cruise. Still, Jack refused to reveal the secret, remembering how traumatic it had been when he'd been told Harper wasn't his father. Ernesto revealed himself to Isabella on the cruise, kidnapped her, and blew up the ship with Jack, Jennifer, and several other Salemites on board. The shipwrecked passengers found their way to an island, where Jack and Jennifer had sex for the first time.

While Jack and Jennifer were now officially in a relationship, Jack was still held back by fears about his adequacy that would be vividly manifested by visions of his two infamous fathers, Duke Johnson and Harper Deveraux. Then, less than a month after Jack returned from the island, Harper Deveraux in the flesh escaped from jail with one goal: kill Steve Johnson. In his sick mind, Steve was to blame for destroying the Deveraux family. Harper took up a sniper position in the bell tower of the church where Steve and Kayla were getting married for the second time. Jack ran up into the bell tower to foil Harper's plan. However, as he wrestled with Harper for his gun, Harper fell to his death. This caused a huge rift in Jack's relationship with Jennifer as he now considered himself a "killer" and unworthy of her once again. He broke up with her.

While Jack was working through his trauma with a psychiatrist, Jennifer discovered that her old friend from boarding school Katerina Von Leuschner was in town, now calling herself Dr. Carly Manning. Her family had arranged for her to marry a man named Lawrence Alamain. Carly didn’t want to marry him, and she'd come to Salem to hide. Jennifer volunteered to pose as Katerina for the engagement period. She traveled to New York and underwent an elaborate charade. She told no one, but Jack realized what she was doing and he chased her down to convince her to give up the pretense. Unfortunately, she’d become enmeshed in something much deeper and darker than she'd imagined. As Jack was attempting to extricate her from the situation, he was notified that Steve had been seriously injured in an explosion. He returned to Salem only to witness his brother die, killed on Lawrence's orders (unbeknownst to Jack).

While Jack was in Salem, Jennifer was taken to Alamania and discovered, to her horror, that Lawrence was holding her childhood sweetheart and the Brady's adoptive son Frankie Brady prisoner. It seems he was actually Katerina's brother, François. Lawrence threatened Frankie to force Jennifer to marry him. After Steve's death, Jack finally had clarity about what he needed. He was relentless in his pursuit of Jennifer, following her to Alamania and then confronting her about her feelings. However, he found her adamantly set on marrying Lawrence. While he had no idea she was protecting Frankie, he knew something was very wrong and that she didn't really want to marry Lawrence. When he attempted to physically interrupt her wedding to Lawrence, Lawrence's goons knocked him out and put him in a cell next to Frankie. Sadly, while Jack was trapped in a cell and unable to help, Lawrence raped Jennifer on their wedding night. Jack eventually escaped and convinced Jennifer to repudiate Lawrence with the help of several other Salemites who had come to rescue them. Furious, Lawrence blew up his villa with them inside. They were only able to escape with the help of Lawrence's father Leopold, who lost his own life in the process.

Once back in Salem, Jack proposed to Jennifer, and she accepted. However, she was pulling away from him. She was uncomfortable with physical affection because of her trauma from the rape, but she pretended nothing was wrong. When Jack surprised her with an aggressive kiss, she had a flashback to Lawrence, slapped Jack, and called him a rapist. Appalled and convinced Jennifer could never truly love him, he immediately ended their engagement and said they were over for good.

Jack was also dealing with Lawrence’s attempt to buy Diana Colville’s shares of “The Spectator” and ruin him professionally. Diana told Jack she’d sell to Lawrence unless Jack could outbid him and while Jack was wealthy, he didn’t have millions of dollars in cash at the ready.

Eve Donovan approached Jack with an offer. Her former pimp Nick Corelli had recently been murdered, and he had left $10 million to Eve on the condition that she marry for love. Eve told Jack that if he married her, she’d split the money with him. Desperate, Jack agreed. He and Eve tied the knot and did their best to pretend they were madly in love.

Then, Eve was accused of Nick's murder, putting a kink in their plans to get the money. Jack agreed to help her clear her name by finding the real murderer's gun, which they believed was on a Wild West theme train. Jennifer and Frankie decided to accompany them; at this point, Frankie and Eve were developing feelings for each other, and Jack had no desire to stand in their way since he and Eve felt nothing but contempt for each other. Jack and Jennifer were forced to share a cabin on the train, and they became closer and closer both physically and emotionally. Finally, Jennifer admitted to Jack that she'd pushed him away because Lawrence had raped her. Jack had a hard time dealing with it at first, but before the train left the station the next day, he had gotten her a jade plant to symbolize their growing love. When the train derailed and they were forced to fight for their lives together, he told her once again that he loved her. After they got back to Salem, Jack supported Jennifer in her efforts to press charges against Lawrence. Lawrence was convicted and sent to prison.

Jack and Jennifer married in a stadium because Jack accidentally invited everyone in town when he proposed on the TV news after Jennifer's trial. While Jack dreamed that they were married in a wild west show, their actual wedding was traditional. They honeymooned at Universal Studios in Los Angeles, California. There, they met a con man named Hawk. Along with his partner Desiree, a fake psychic, Hawk won Jennifer's trust and insinuated himself into their lives, hoping to take them for every cent they had. Hawk faked a back injury at their penthouse and moved in with them, then worked to convince Jack that he could make millions through insider trading.

Hawk convinced Jack to "sell" all of his stocks and assets to "investment brokers" who were really Hawk's fellow con men. Then, before Jack could think, Hawk set up fake FBI agents to "raid" the place and demand all of the cash Hawk had convinced Jack to bring, telling him he was wanted for illegal trading. Jack fled, and Hawk now had Jack's entire fortune.

Hawk then went back to Salem to get Jack's wife, too. Hawk moved in on her while Jack stayed away, positive he was being hunted by the FBI. Jack returned at Christmas, unable to endure any more time away from his wife, only to discover her with Hawk. Hawk was ultimately exposed as a con man, but Jack and Jennifer were never able to recover any of the money. They were broke.

=== 1992-1993 ===
Accustomed to wealth, Jack despised living in poverty; he was desperate to get back on top. After suffering a series of humiliating setbacks and discovering Jennifer was pregnant, he finally took a job as a low-level reporter at the paper he used to own. Still, he could barely make ends meet. His anxiety became so intense that he physically manifested symptoms of his Hodgkin's Disease recurring and for a time, he believed he was dying.

Then, Jack and Jennifer were evicted because they could not make rent. Jennifer’s father Bill gave them a house. In its attic, Jack found a journal. He turned it into a novel, but was unable to get a publisher interested. When it got into the hands of Titan Publishing's Kate Roberts, she recognized it as the story of her own life taken from her own journal, and she refused to return it.

Jack found a windfall in an abandoned barn and he spent it to buy The Spectator back. However, that money had actually been left there by Billie Reed, who had been holding it for a crime boss. Once she realized Jack was the one who'd found the money and that he no longer had it, she shamed him into helping her attempt to win the money back gambling. Of course, that backfired horribly when the police busted Billie's high-stakes game.

Out of options, he sold The Spectator to a mystery buyer. The buyer was revealed to be Kate. She was happy to keep Jack on as an editor. She liked Jack... a lot. In fact, she tried very hard to seduce him, but he wasn't interested. Then, she married Victor Kiriakis and The Spectator became the property of a crime boss. Jack was disgusted. He thought about quitting, but he needed the job for the insurance because his daughter Abigail had recently been diagnosed with aplastic anemia.

Jack heard that Victor was keeping a secret about a place called "Lot 5," and he became obsessed with finding out what it was. His efforts got him fired. He lost his insurance, but he lost a great deal more than that when Victor told him what he'd been hiding. Victor revealed that he and Harper had once owned the plant that dumped the toxic waste on Lot 5. However, when Victor had found out about the dumping, he'd pulled out; at that point, Harper had replaced him with Jack. Jack had only served as a nominal president, someone to sign the papers Harper put in front of him. (Victor gave the date as 1975, making Jack 13.) But Jack had signed whatever Harper told him to sign without even reading the documents, and thus Victor had papers showing that Jack himself had approved the toxic dumping of the waste. While that was bad, what was truly terrible for Jack personally was that the doctors believed Abby's condition was a result of the toxic waste. Jack was aghast at this revelation, absolutely shattered. He decided his family would be better off without him, and he left Salem.

=== 1994-1998 ===
At first, Jack was determined to stay away. He even sent Jennifer divorce papers. He kept completely incommunicado. However, after a year, he couldn't bear to stay away any longer. Before returning, though, he went to a mental health wellness resort facility called "The Meadows" in order to do some self-improvement. The patients there went by aliases; Jack chose "Clark." A woman there called "Monica" was assigned to Jack as his "buddy." They connected intensely through therapy and one night, after Jennifer harshly rejected Jack, he turned to "Monica" for comfort. They had a one night stand. Later, Jack would discover, to his horror, that "Monica" was Jennifer's mother Laura Horton! To make matters worse, Laura began nourishing an unrequited love for "Clark" that took years to fade.

When Jack returned to Salem, he found Jennifer with Peter Blake. Peter Blake was the adopted son of Stefano DiMera. While Stefano was an infamous criminal, Peter assured Jennifer that he was different. However, Peter was much more like Stefano than he appeared to be on the surface. When Laura tried to interfere with his relationship with Jennifer, he gaslighted her so badly she almost killed herself; later, he murdered a "business associate" who'd become a liability. While Peter temporarily tried to clean up his act for Jennifer, he fell back into his old ways whenever the heat was on. Still, Peter was able to hide his true self long enough to romance Jennifer, and she accepted his marriage proposal in 1995 despite Jack's best efforts to get between them.

Peter and Jennifer decided to marry at Aremid, Peter's childhood home which had been vacant for 20 years. Jack believed he could uncover damaging secrets there, but all he found was the "Lady in White." (Later, she was revealed to be Peter's presumed dead mother Rachel Blake.) After two years of tireless investigation, Jack was finally able to prove to Jennifer that Peter was a criminal when he got evidence of Peter's dirty dealings from a former co-conspirator, Daniel Scott.

Peter denied everything. However, seeing that Jennifer did not believe his lies, he became desperate. Peter decided to kidnap Jennifer and Abby and take them to one of Stefano's private islands. He broke into Jennifer's house, fully intending to spirit her and Abby away. After figuring out Peter's plan, Jack caught Peter going up the stairs to Jennifer's bedroom. Jack pulled a gun on Peter and demanded that he stop. Peter charged Jack and in the struggle over the gun, Jack accidentally shot Peter. Peter was rushed to the hospital and the next day, he was declared dead.

Jack was arrested for murder. He pleaded guilty to involuntary manslaughter to spare his family the pain of a jury trial. Thanks to Stefano's blackmail of the judge, Jack was convicted of murder and given a sentence of life without the possibility of parole.

All this time, Peter was actually alive. Stefano had faked Peter's death in order to keep him out of jail and to get revenge on Jack. Nobody knew Peter was alive but the DiMeras and Laura, who'd stumbled across Peter at his "funeral." Her short-term memory was promptly erased via laser, and its eventual return was of little help to Jack due to her history of mental illness.

Jack spent over nine months in jail. Then, one of Stefano's henchmen, Travis Malloy, kidnapped Jennifer hoping for a big payday from Peter. When Jack heard that Jennifer had been kidnapped, he escaped from prison to search for her himself. He tracked Jennifer to Travis’ mountain cabin and rescued her, but as the two men struggled on the cliffside, Travis fell to his death. Jack and Jennifer were reunited, but Jack was still a fugitive. They went on the run with Abby until they could find Peter and prove Jack's innocence.

Unfortunately, while on Stefano's island recuperating, Peter had been bitten by an infected mosquito and contracted “jungle madness.” When he arrived back in the United States and got on Jennifer and Jack's trail, he was in the throes of the disease.

Jack, Jennifer, and Abby took jobs with the circus while they were on the run. The cover was effective for a time, but eventually, Peter caught up with them. He tipped the FBI off to Jack's whereabouts, ensuring Jack was hauled off to jail. Then, he went after Jennifer, almost strangling her during an attack of his disease. As she fled him in a car, she had a wreck. With the help of her new friends at the circus, she faked her death to escape his relentless pursuit. The circus owner was supposed to let her family and friends know that she was alive. However, before he could, Peter beat the man into a coma. Jennifer went into hiding, completely unaware that everyone thought she was dead. Knowing Peter would come to her "funeral", Jennifer used tricks leaned at the circus to appear as an "angel" and tell the machine-gun wielding madman to turn himself in. Stunned, he did so. Jennifer and Jack were joyfully reunited later that evening.

Peter was taken into custody and given the antidote for his jungle madness by Stefano. Jack was finally exonerated, and he proposed to Jennifer the next day. However, their wedding plans were put on hold when Laura was falsely accused of murdering Kristen. After Laura was cleared, Jack and Jennifer abruptly decided to take Abby and visit Jennifer's father in Africa “for the summer.” That visit lasted for over two years.

=== 2000-2006 ===
Jack never lost his desire to reestablish himself financially, and while in Africa, he often sought business opportunities that took him away from Jennifer and Abby for long periods. Jennifer resented his long absences and started to have feelings for a charming Irishman named Colin Murphy who was doing volunteer work with her father Bill. When Colin left for home, Jennifer decided to take Abby and follow him. However, Colin was engaged to someone else. A disappointed Jennifer returned to Salem.

Jack followed her to Salem, determined to win back his family. Jennifer was initially hostile to him, but he eventually won her over. On Valentine’s Day 2003, Jennifer proposed to Jack and they remarried on a special episode of their talk show “In the House.”

Just when they were about to settle down, Jack was apparently murdered by a serial killer known as the Salem Stalker. Jennifer mourned him for months, although she drew some comfort from the fact that she was pregnant with his son. However, Jack and all of the other “murder victims” were actually alive and well on a remote island called Melaswen. The Stalker was Tony (actually Andre) DiMera, and he'd faked Jack's death.

Jennifer realized Jack was alive, flew to the island, and crash landed in the jungle. She arrived just in time for the birth of Jack Jr. aka JJ Deveraux. Unfortunately, as they attempted to escape the island, a tsunami wave claimed Jack.

Jennifer mourned Jack all over again. However, he was not actually dead this time either. He was being held prisoner in DiMera's European castle. He spent months there. After numerous failed attempts, Jack eventually escaped with fellow prisoners Cassie Brady, Marlena Evans and Roman Brady.

After returning, Jack started suffering from severe pain; he was diagnosed with an ultra-rare blood disease that would kill him in a few months. To spare his family, he decided to fake his death yet again, this time when his car skidded off a bridge into a river – but not before he’d pushed Jennifer towards her old flame Frankie Brady to make sure someone would be there to take his place.

While he was dying in hospice care miles away from Salem, Jack met an amnesiac nurse who turned out to be his “dead” brother Steve. Steve told Jack that he'd go back to Salem if Jack went, too. Jack reluctantly agreed. Jack and Steve arrived in Salem just in time to interrupt Frankie and Jennifer's wedding. When Jack tried to leave again, they begged him to stay. Frankie found an experimental drug trial online, and Jack was cured.

At that point, The Spectator asked Jack and Jennifer to head up its London bureau. They left for the UK in September 2006, JJ in tow.

=== 2010-2012 ===
When Alice Horton died in 2010, Jennifer came back to Salem for the funeral without Jack. She told everyone he was on a "walkabout" in Australia "finding himself.” She was furious and considering divorce.

Jack returned to Salem in 2011, looking ragged and worn. He told Jennifer that the "walkabout" had been a cover story. The reality: Jack had followed a top secret lead on a drug trafficking ring to Afghanistan. Once he'd arrived there, the traffickers had captured him and kept him prisoner in a cave for a year, brutally torturing him.

Jack was shocked to come back to Salem only to find his wife in the arms of another man. Jennifer had completed the divorce proceedings without him, and she'd moved on with Dr. Daniel Jonas.

At first Jennifer was cold, but once she realized what Jack had suffered, she softened towards him. Still, she stopped short of taking him back. Her connection to Jack hadn't gone away, but she was torn as she had come to love Daniel as well. She simply could not make up her mind. The "holding pattern" was becoming unbearable for Jack, and he was considering walking away despite the fact that he loved Jennifer desperately. At that moment, Daniel stepped aside instead.

This led to Jack and Jennifer reconciling and getting engaged. Jack took a job teaching journalism at Salem University, and it looked like he was ready to settle down in Salem once again with his family intact.

It was not to be. At a gala, Abby became trapped in an elevator when a massive explosion rocked the building. Jack got her out of the elevator, but when he rescued her, he became trapped inside himself seconds before the cable holding it broke. The elevator plummeted down the shaft, and he reportedly died instantly. The Deveraux family mourned Jack yet again.

=== 2018-present ===
Six years after his supposed death, Jack returned to Salem with Eve Donovan at his side during a New Year's Eve Gala celebrating the Horton Center. He had amnesia and didn't remember anyone or anything about Salem. He'd been rescued by the DiMeras and healed by Dr. Rolf. Eve was able to manipulate him readily while he had amnesia. He became an unscrupulous politician and won the position of mayor, but at the cost of alienating all of his friends and family, especially his son JJ. Eve was even able to manipulate Jack into marrying her, although he walked out on her when he found her destroying the serum and journal that would bring back his memory. He was able to regain his memory via a thump on the head he received while rescuing Jennifer from her stalker.

Not long after Jack regained his memory, he and Jennifer were married once more. However, tragedy struck on the night of their wedding. Jennifer was pushed from a balcony by a mind-controlled Hope and went into a coma due to her injuries. Jennifer was in the coma for an entire year.

In 2021, Jack discovered that he had another daughter named Gwendolyn "Gwen" Rizczech from a one night stand with a waitress named Tiffany Rizczech. It had happened years before he came to Salem. Gwen despised Jack for abandoning her as a child. She also despised her younger sister Abigail for getting all the attention that she felt should have been hers. She came to town with an agenda: destroy the Deverauxs. She did a whole lot of damage before discovering Jack didn't even know about her existence prior to her arrival in Salem because Jack's mother in-law, Laura Horton, had been paying Tiffany to stay away in order to preserve her daughter Jennifer's marriage to Jack.

After realizing that Jack had not actually abandoned her, Gwen tried to rebuild a relationship with him. Unfortunately, her anger at Abby and malicious acts kept getting in the way, one of which was to "accidentally" kill Laura. Still, Jack forgave his daughter again and again, and they were on good terms when he and Jennifer left for Boston in 2022 to nurture a small newspaper there.

In 2022, Jack experienced the worst horror imaginable for a father when his daughter Abigail was brutally murdered by Clyde Weston. Jennifer also fell apart, relapsing into her prescription drug addiction and accidentally hitting Gwen with her car. At the time, Gwen agreed not to say anything. However, when Jack angered Gwen by threatening to disown her if she didn't testify against Xander, Gwen blackmailed him into giving her The Spectator by saying she would report Jennifer's hit and run to the police if he didn't sign it over. Desperate to protect Jennifer, he signed it over despite Jennifer's protests. Before leaving for Boston, he told Gwen he loved her, but he needed to get some distance from her.

For a few months in 2024, Jack was led to believe that Abby might actually be alive when Cat Greene was forced to impersonate her by Clyde Weston; they'd faked a DNA test that supposedly "proved" her identity. His heart was broken all over again when it was revealed to be a hoax.

Jack and Jennifer currently reside in Boston. They visit Salem on a recurring basis.

== Reception ==
In 2020, Charlie Mason from Soaps She Knows placed Jack 29th on his list of the 35 most memorable characters from Days of Our Lives, writing that "To Matthew Ashford's credit, he managed to turn the villain who raped [Kayla] into not only a beloved comic-relief character but a well-intentioned hero who became so popular, he was allowed to cheat death. Repeatedly." Mason also called Jack a "born sinner" despite being "however repentant".
