= Melissa Reeves =

American actress (born 1967)

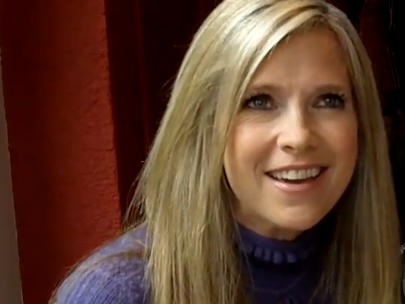
- Reeves in 2010
- Born: Melissa Brennan; March 14, 1967 (age 59); Eatontown, New Jersey, U.S.
- Occupation: Actress
- Years active: 1983–present
- Spouse: Scott Reeves (m. 1990)
- Children: 2

Melissa Reeves (née Brennan; born March 14, 1967) is an American actress. She is known for playing Jennifer Horton on the NBC Daytime soap opera Days of Our Lives (1985–1995, 2000–2006, 2010–2022, 2024–present). She has been nominated for two Daytime Emmy Awards for her work on Days of Our Lives. She has also won four Soap Opera Digest Awards.

== Early life ==
Reeves was born in Eatontown, New Jersey and raised in Red Bank. Her maiden name is Melissa Brennan. Her father was a Disc jockey for a radio station in Asbury Park, where he met musicians like Bruce Springsteen. She has one sibling, a brother.

At the age of thirteen, she started taking the bus and train to New York to attend dance classes, studying with Phil Black. Reeves wanted to become a dancer on Broadway. She also studied at the Lee Strasberg Theatre and Film Institute in Manhattan.

== Career ==
=== 1983-1985: Santa Barbara ===
In the early 1980s, Reeves (then known as Melissa Brennan) began acting in television commercials to help pay for her dance classes. She worked as an extra on the NBC soap opera Another World. She appeared in the afterschool special The Lakeside High Experiment. She also appeared in the film Somewhere, Tomorrow (1983), co-starring with Sarah Jessica Parker.

Reeves moved to Los Angeles in 1984, when she was cast as Jade Perkins on the NBC soap opera Santa Barbara. She was seventeen years old at the time. She became emancipated from her parents and finished high school with a GED. Reeves was dismissed from her role on Santa Barbara after nine months. The character of Jade went out on a date and was never seen again. Reeves received two Young Artist Award nominations for her work on Santa Barbara.

=== 1985-1992: Days of Our Lives ===
In 1985, she guest starred on Hotel and Highway to Heaven. A month after leaving Santa Barbara, Reeves was cast as Jennifer Horton on the NBC soap opera Days of Our Lives. She auditioned with Michael T. Weiss, who played Mike Horton. The role had previously been played by child actress Jennifer Peterson in 1978. Reeves received two Young Artist Award nominations for her work on Days of Our Lives.

Reeves played Heather in the thriller film Summer Camp Nightmare (1987). She guest starred on The Hitchhiker.

During her early years on Days of Our Lives, Reeves was involved in teen storylines. In 1990, the character of Jennifer was given an adult storyline when she was paired romantically with Jack Deveraux (Matthew Ashford). In 1991, Reeves and Ashford won a Soap Opera Digest Award for Outstanding Super Couple: Daytime. In 1992, they won Soap Opera Digest Awards for Best Love Story and Best Wedding. In 1992, Reeves was nominated for a Daytime Emmy Award for Outstanding Younger Actress in a Drama Series.

=== 1992-1999: Leaving Days ===
Reeves played Jennifer Horton Deveraux in the Days of Our Lives television film One Stormy Night (1992). She also played Jennifer in the Days of Our Lives television film, Night Sins (1993). In 1994, she won a Soap Opera Digest Award for Hottest Female Star. She played Jennifer in the Days of Our Lives television film Winter Heat (1994).

In November 1995, Reeves abruptly left Days of Our Lives. Rumors began to circulate when she didn't attend the 30th anniversary party for Days. In a statement, Reeves said, "I'm at a point in my life where I need to spend more time with my husband Scott, and our daughter." Soap Opera Digest reported that Reeves leaving Days disrupted plans for a spinoff involving her character, Jennifer. Reeves' final airdate was December 15, 1995. The role was recast with Stephanie Cameron, who began airing on December 19. Kimberley Simms, Jessica Tuck, and Karen Witter had reportedly been considered to replace Reeves. Corday Productions and Sony Entertainment sued Reeves for breach of contract. The lawsuit was settled out of court with Reeves paying an unspecified sum, which Days Executive Producer Ken Corday donated to pediatric HIV/AIDS research.

In 1999, Reeves and her husband, Scott Reeves, co-starred in the ABC television film Half a Dozen Babies. The movie was based on the true story of the Dilley sextuplets, with the Reeves playing their parents.

=== 2000-present ===
In 2000, Reeves returned to Days of Our Lives, playing the role of Jennifer Horton. Her first airdate was October 6, 2000. In November 2000, she played Jennifer in the television film Days of Our Lives' 35th Anniversary. She decided to leave the show again in 2006. Reeves was unhappy with her storyline and she wanted to move to Nashville, Tennessee, where her husband works as a country musician. Her last airdate was September 21, 2006.

In 2010, Reeves returned to Days of Our Lives for a short-term visit when the character of Alice Horton died. She aired from June 10, 2010 to July 9, 2010. It was announced in July 2010 that she had signed a long-term contract with the show. She began airing again on November 12, 2010. In 2016, Reeves was nominated for a Daytime Emmy Award for Outstanding Supporting Actress in a Drama Series. In 2017, she co-starred with her husband, Scott Reeves, in the film Where the Fast Lane Ends.

On September 15, 2020, it was announced that Reeves had opted not to return to the role when filming began again after a hiatus brought on by the COVID-19 pandemic. The role of Jennifer was recast with Cady McClain. This followed criticism Reeves received from some fans, as well as her co-stars Lamon Archey and Linsey Godfrey, for 'liking' social media posts by conservative commentator Candace Owens which denounced the Black Lives Matter movement. Reeves had previously drawn criticism in 2012 for expressing support for fast-food chain Chick-fil-A during a controversy over its chief operating officer declaring the chain's stance against same-sex marriage.

Reeves has made return appearances to Days of Our Lives in 2021 and 2024.

== Personal life ==
She met actor Scott Reeves when he briefly played the role of Jake on Days of Our Lives. They became engaged on April 1, 1989 in Vancouver, where he was filming Friday the 13th Part VIII: Jason Takes Manhattan. Shortly before their wedding, Scott underwent surgery to have an abscess removed from his brain. They were married on March 23, 1990 at Lake Manor Chapel in Chatsworth, California. The Reeves are Christians. They have a daughter, born in 1992, and a son, born in 1997.

== Filmography ==
=== Film ===
Year	Title	Role	Notes
1983	Somewhere, Tomorrow	Georgina	Credited as Missy Brennen
1987	Summer Camp Nightmare	Heather	Credited as Melissa Brennan
2001	Basic Training	Shannon	Short film
2017	Where the Fast Lane Ends	Rachel Morgan	

=== Television ===
Year	Title	Role	Notes
1984–1985	Santa Barbara	Jade Perkins	Contract role Credited as Melissa Brennan 92 episodes
1985	Hotel	Jenny	Episode: "Wins and Losses" Credited as Melissa Brennan
1985	Highway to Heaven	Cathy	Episode: "A Song for Jason: Part One" Credited as Melissa Brennan
1985–1995, 2000–2006, 2010–2020; Guest/Recurring: 2021-2022, 2024–present	Days of Our Lives	Jennifer Horton	Contract role
1987	The Hitchhiker	Denise O'Mell	Episode: "Homebodies" Credited as Melissa Brennan
1992	Days of our Lives: One Stormy Night	Jennifer Horton	Television film
1993	Days of our Lives: Night Sins	Jennifer Horton	Television film
1994	Days of our Lives: Winter Heat	Jennifer Horton	Television film
1999	Half a Dozen Babies	Becki Dilley	Television film
2000	Days of Our Lives' 35th Anniversary	Jennifer Horton	Television film

== Awards and nominations ==
Year	Award	Category	Title	Result	Ref.
1983–1984	Young Artist Award	Best Young Actress in a Daytime or Nighttime Television Series	Santa Barbara	Nominated	
1984–1985	Young Artist Award	Best Young Actress in a Daytime or Nighttime Television Series	Santa Barbara	Nominated	
1985–1986	Young Artist Award	Exceptional Performance by a Young Actor in a Daytime Series	Days of Our Lives	Nominated	
1986–1987	Young Artist Award	Best Young Actress Starring in a Television Drama Series	Days of Our Lives	Nominated	
1991	Soap Opera Digest Award	Favorite Daytime Super Couple (shared with Matthew Ashford)	Days of Our Lives	Won	
1992	Soap Opera Digest Award	Best Daytime Wedding (shared with Matthew Ashford)	Days of Our Lives	Won	
1992	Soap Opera Digest Award	Best Love Story Daytime or Primetime (shared with Matthew Ashford)	Days of Our Lives	Won	
1992	Daytime Emmy Award	Outstanding Younger Actress in a Drama Series	Days of Our Lives	Nominated	
1994	Soap Opera Digest Award	Hottest Female Star	Days of Our Lives	Won	
2016	Daytime Emmy Award	Outstanding Supporting Actress in a Drama Series	Days of Our Lives	Nominated	

== See also ==
- Days of Our Lives
- Jack Deveraux and Jennifer Horton
