= Half a Dozen Babies =

1999 American television film

- Starring: Scott Reeves; Melissa Reeves
- Composer: Eric Allaman
- Country of origin: United States
- Original language: English

Production
- Running time: 89 minutes
- Production company: Carlton America

Original release
- Network: ABC
- Release: 1999

Half a Dozen Babies (also known as Life's Little Struggles) is a 1999 ABC television film. It stars Scott and Melissa Reeves.

== Plot ==
A young couple have been struggling to have a baby for years, unsuccessfully. Then, suddenly, one day, they find out that they are having sextuplets. The movie is based on the true story of Keith and Becki Dilley and the Dilley sextuplets, born in 1993.

== Cast ==
- Scott Reeves as Keith Dilley
- Melissa Reeves as Becki Dilley
- Judith Ivey as Doris Stauffer
- Teri Garr as Lee Dilley
- Kate McNeill as Becki's Doctor
