= Dilley sextuplets =

American sextuplets

Dilley Sextuplets
- Born: May 25, 1993 (age 33); Indianapolis, Indiana, United States
- Other name: Dilley siblings

The Dilley sextuplets (born May 25, 1993) are North America's first set of surviving sextuplets, born to Becki and Keith Dilley in Indianapolis, Indiana, United States. They are, in birth order:

Baby Order	Time of Birth	Sex	Birth Weight	Name
A	5:28 PM	Girl	2 lbs 6 oz	Brenna Rose
B	5:28 PM	Boy	2 lbs 13 oz	Julian Emerson
C	5:29 PM	Boy	2 lbs 11 oz	Quinn Everett
D	5:30 PM	Girl	2 lbs 7 oz	Claire Diane
E	5:30 PM	Boy	2 lbs 13 oz	Ian Michael
F	5:32 PM	Boy	2 lbs 2 oz	Adrian Reed

== Biography ==
The siblings were the first surviving sextuplets to be born in the USA.

The parents of the sextuplets, Becki and Keith Dilley, met as co-workers at a Wendy's restaurant in Indiana. They married and attempted to conceive for 5 years without results. Following consultation with a doctor, they were told they had little chance of conceiving naturally. Following several more years of trying to conceive, they underwent fertility treatment using the drug Pergonal. The sextuplets were conceived as a result of this.

Throughout the pregnancy, all ultrasounds showed five babies. After five had been delivered the doctor reached in to retrieve the placenta and grabbed a foot instead, and said, "There's a sixth baby." Everyone initially thought she was kidding, but she wasn't. The sixth was hiding behind the mother's spleen.

The Dilley children have appeared on a few television segments, but say that they don't want to live life "under a microscope".

From 1997 to 2011 the family lived in Northeastern Indiana.

Professional achievements (2019–present):

As of May 2019, Julian Dilley - the second-born in the sextuplets - graduated from Indiana University School of Medicine and began an orthopedic surgery residency, becoming the first physician in the family and pursuing a research track during his sixth year of training. Other siblings have also followed health‑related careers: Ian is practicing as a pharmacist; Claire works as a nurse. Brenna works in human services, and Adrian and Quinn are in military service.

Milestone birthdays and public reflections:

In February 2023, media profiles commemorated the sextuplets' approaching 30th birthday, highlighting their continued close-knit relationships and reflections on growing up as America's first surviving sextuplets.

== Popular culture ==
- Appearance on Food Network's Last Cake Standing S8:E10: 'Sweet Sixteen Sextuplets.' Episode aired Apr 2009.
- Appearance on Rachel Ray S2.E33: 'The Dilley Sextuplets.' Episode aired Oct 24, 2007.
- Appearance on Good Morning America with Diane Sawyer. Episode aired Nov 28, 2007.
- In mid-2000s, the sextuplets appeared in television commercials for Campbell's 'Make It Campbell's Instead' ad campaign.
- Primetime Special Edition: 'Baby, Oh Baby: The Six-pack Turns Nine.' Episode aired May 25, 2002.
- Primetime Special Edition: 'Dilley Six Pack's Happy New Year.' Episode aired Dec 22, 2002.
- Throughout the early 2000s, the sextuplets appeared in television commercials for Meijer.
- 20/20 episode titled 'Dilley Sextuplets.' Episode aired May 26, 1999.
- An American film telling the story of the sextuplets' parents prior, and a few years after their births, called Half a Dozen Babies featuring real-life husband and wife Scott Reeves and Melissa Reeves was made in 1999 for ABC.
