= Jack Deveraux and Jennifer Horton =

Jack and Jennifer
- Matthew Ashford and Melissa Reeves as Jack and Jennifer
- Duration: 1989–2012, 2019–
- Introduced by: Ken Corday and Al Rabin
In-universe information
- Other names: JnJ
- Family: Deveraux, Horton, Johnson,
- Spouse: 1991–93, 2003–11, 2019–
- Children: Abigail Deveraux; Jack "JJ" Deveraux Jr.
- Grandchildren: Thomas DiMera; Charlotte DiMera

Jack Harcourt Deveraux and Jennifer Rose Horton are fictional characters and a supercouple from the NBC daytime drama Days of Our Lives, whose history spans from 1989 until 2012. The two have been portrayed by more than one actor/actress since their inception, but were originally, most recently, and most famously portrayed by Matthew Ashford and Melissa Reeves. Fans have nicknamed the couple "J&J" or JnJ" (for Jack and Jennifer) on internet message boards. For their portrayal of Jack and Jennifer's romance, Ashford and Reeves won Soap Opera Digest Awards for Favorite Supercouple in 1991 and Best Love Story in 1992.

== Storylines ==
=== Backstory ===
Jack Deveraux was the adopted son of Harper Deveraux. Harper was a U.S. Senator, and Jack was an aspiring politician, but it was revealed that Harper was a sociopathic killer. At one point, Jack was a suspect for the killings in town, and it seemed that his father was actually trying to frame him.

Unbeknownst to Jack, he was really Billy Johnson, Jo Johnson's son and Steve Johnson's baby brother. Jo had given up her boys for adoption when she feared that her abusive husband Duke would kill them. Young Steve Johnson watched helplessly as his baby brother Billy was adopted and taken from him.

Jack was raised in the lap of luxury, but he was not given a very compassionate upbringing. When he came to town, he tried to woo Kayla Brady and when Steve found out Jack was really his brother and that Jack was dying from Hodgkin's disease, he pushed Kayla away and encouraged her to marry dying Jack. Jack recovered, and Kayla was unable to consummate their marriage. Jack felt that Kayla just needed time to get to love him, and he tried to be patient. Kayla became sick when Harper began poisoning her, and Steve saved her life. Steve told Kayla why he had pushed her away and then the two began an affair, with plans to end her marriage to Jack after his election. Jack found out about the affair and was enraged by Kayla's constant rebuffs and promises that she would one day be ready. When he was rebuffed again, he showed her the pictures and then he raped her in a violent rage.

In the ensuing months, he descended full-time into his anger and let it shape and define him. Desperate to please his father (who was a sociopathic misogynist), Jack tried to be Harper's son and he worked hard at bringing down the people who had scorned him: Kayla and Steve. He tried to warn Steve away from his wife by having him beat up. Eventually Steve and Jack fought on the rooftop of the loft where Jack had lived with Kayla. Jack fell and almost died, but Steve gave his baby brother a kidney, saving the younger man's life.

Eventually Jack found out he was Steve's brother, and he was angry and bitter. He gave Kayla a divorce but still maintained that he was provoked into his attack on her, and refused to call it rape. He plea-bargained to domestic assault when she took him to court, and he continued to harass her whenever he saw her. He claimed he had been railroaded into that plea-bargain.

Meanwhile, Melissa Horton, his assistant and Jennifer Horton's cousin, was in love with him. He was encouraged by his stepmother Angelica to use Melissa's feelings for him to try to secure Harper's Senate seat, left empty by Harper's conviction for murder. The other candidate was Melissa's adoptive father, Mickey Horton, and Angelica felt that Melissa's support of Jack would lend strength to his campaign.

Melissa saw Jack making romantic plans with another woman on the day of their wedding, and she left him at the altar. Jack's career aspirations as a politician were in shambles, and he spent a great deal of time and energy trying to destroy Mickey Horton's reputation, as well as that of Mickey's nephew and Jennifer's brother: Dr. Mike Horton. Having completely alienated his biological family as well as the Hortons and Bradys, Jack was mostly a social pariah.

=== 1989–90 ===
Desperate to keep "The Spectator" from printing an exposé on his dirty dealings as a politician, Jack purchased a controlling share and changed his destiny. He abandoned his political goals and became a newspaperman. At first, Jack's involvement in the paper was purely intended to squelch the truth, but soon he became caught up in the actual business of reporting the truth.

Jennifer was young and fairly inexperienced in the ways of life. Although she had had many puppy-love romances, Jennifer had yet to consummate them, waiting for the "right guy". Jennifer began a college internship for Jack as a cub-reporter. Her initial feelings towards Jack were unfavorable due to his treatment of Kayla and Melissa, but Jennifer soon learned that her boss had a different side to him.

Jennifer refused to let Jack make excuses for the terrible things he had done, and she called him on the carpet whenever he tried to use his newspaper to gratuitously hurt people he didn't care for. She also gently pushed him to try to get closer to his family.

Jennifer was dating Emilio Ramirez, a former gang member who had also had some negative dealings with Jack during the days when Jack was actively tormenting Steve and Kayla.

Jack started to develop feelings for Jennifer and started half-heartedly pursuing her while trying to throw monkey-wrenches into her relationship with Emilio, who he deemed to be a deadbeat and not good enough for her. Jennifer didn't seem to return those feelings at first, but began to see that Jack wasn't someone she needed to fear and the two formed an odd friendship. Emilio left town after a skirmish involving Adrienne (Jack and Steve's younger sister) and her ex-husband Justin. Emilio, who had had sex with Adrienne, had tampered with Justin's car, and although he wasn't sent to jail, Jennifer could not be with someone who would do something like that.

Jennifer wanted to foster a baby girl named Hannah after Hannah's mom was convicted of robbery and sent to jail for three years. Ironically, Hannah's mother had committed the crime so that she would have the shelter of prison when giving birth. Jack, who himself felt he had been abandoned by his mother Jo, refused to write an editorial supporting Hannah being with her mother in jail.

Jennifer was then injured in the pursuit of a story for the Spectator, and a frantic Jack realized that he was in love with her. He concocted a plan to fake marriage with Jennifer so that Jennifer and he could spend more time together in a more intimate setting. At first, Jennifer was very wary of the idea and point-blank brought up the fact that his track record was lousy and he was very difficult to trust. In the end, she agreed to the plan, but the foster agency refused to give a baby to a man who had assaulted his ex-wife.

Jack was hurt by this, but Jennifer was honest with him about how his past made it hard to trust him. Jennifer decided to move into the apartment Jack had rented out to fool the social worker, and with some behind-the-scenes maneuvering by the still-tricky Jack, she ended up fostering the baby for a short while.

Jack was adorably endearing helping feed and care for the very young child, and seeing him with the baby made Jennifer develop warmer feelings towards him. Jennifer lost custody when Sally's parents decided to take custody of their granddaughter. Jennifer was furious with Jack for failing to warn her about this when he had known it was happening, but in the end, she turned to him for comfort when she realized he just didn't know how to tell her.

Emilio came back to town, and Jennifer ended up getting involved with him again, but by now, Jack was always on her mind. She did not yet realize she loved Jack, but she verbally and emotionally sparred with him in a way that gave off super-couple sparks. Jack continued to try to move in on Jennifer, but refused to admit that was what he was doing.

Jennifer's constant urging that he do the right thing ended up having a huge effect on Jack. The newspaper business was also a very good influence on him, and before he knew it, he found himself wanting to do good things for the sake of doing them, and not for the sake of being thought a hero. He tried to subtly get closer to Steve, Adrienne and Jo; Steve was very leery of the purported change.

Steve's presumed-dead wife Marina came to town and blackmailed Steve to help her find a key. Intrigued by this, Jack started to try to snoop around, and Steve kept warning him to keep out of it. Eventually, Jack struck up a friendship with Marina's very kind sister Isabella, whom she had been keeping locked up in a sanitarium. Jack helped Isabella escape, and the two struck up a genuine friendship. At this time, Isabella's blind acceptance of him, as well as the other good influences in his life, had pushed Jack into becoming the kind of person who took responsibilities for the things he had done. Jack began to feel that he was a terrible person who didn't deserve a woman like Jennifer. He was terrified he would end up hurting her like he had hurt Kayla, or the way Harper had hurt all the women he had attacked, or even the way Duke had hurt his mother and sister.

As Jack began to realize the depth of how bad his past actions were, he frantically sought to push Jennifer away. Jo Johnson and Isabella Toscano both tried to get him to see that he and Jennifer made sense. Jennifer had fallen in love with Jack by now, and she was finally admitting it to herself. Although initially against the match, her grandmother was also starting to see the magic between the two.

Jack ended up finding the missing key and helping Steve find Kayla, who had been kidnapped by Victor Kiriakis (who also wanted the key, since he had been searching for it for years) this finally brought Jack together with Steve, and although his relationship with his family was still on shaky legs, Jack was asked to be Steve's best man at his remarriage to Kayla, who was also struggling to accept the reformed Jack. During the Key incident, Jack had tried hard to persuade Kayla not to leave Steve, and Kayla had finally realized that Jack really did want to help bring Steve and Kayla together.

Jack discovered that the treasure behind the key was Isabella's mother's diary. The diary revealed that Isabella was Victor Kiriakis's daughter, and that Isabella's father, Ernesto, had killed Isabella's mother. Frantic to protect Isabella from this harsh and terrible truth, he ripped out the truth-revealing pages and gave her the rest of the diary.

Jennifer tried to force Jack into declaring himself by getting engaged to Emilio, but Jack held steady. Jennifer tried on numerous occasions to seduce him, but Jack tried very hard to resist her, believing firmly he did not deserve Jennifer.

Harper contacted Jack in an effort to get Jack's help in convincing the parole board that he should go free. Jennifer and Jack shared a very passionate set of kisses when Jennifer tearfully begged Jack to start seeing himself as a good man. Jack was convinced that he was just like Harper and that he owed to Harper, as his son, to help him.

Jennifer desperately wanted Harper to leave Jack alone, because Jack was doing so well at travelling a redemptive path. Jennifer felt Harper was a toxic weight around Jack's neck. Furious that a "little girl" presumed to tell him what to do, Harper told a frightened Jack that he would kill Jennifer if she continued this behavior. Although Harper was in jail, Jack knew that his adoptive father would find a way to make it happen, so he pushed Jennifer away by firing her.

Jennifer was quickly hired by WATB, a television station, and ended up becoming an anchorwoman.

When Jennifer was set to marry Emilio, Jack kidnapped her on her wedding day so that she would have time to think about her future, and he confessed his true feelings. Of course, Jennifer was asleep during his heartfelt speech. They ended up on a ledge together after Jennifer ran off when she realized he was faking a news report of dangerous bears in the area. Jack finally appeared to be giving into Jennifer, and the two were gently kissing on the ledge when Melissa and Emilio came and rescued them.

Jennifer was furious at Jack for pushing her away yet again, and she told him that she would marry Emilio. Emilio decided to delay the wedding, and he was developing feelings for his singing partner, Melissa, who returned those feelings. Neither Emilio nor Melissa were ready to admit those feelings to themselves or each other.

Jack and Jennifer ended up on a cruise together in the name of work. The cruise was secretly being orchestrated by Isabella's presumed-dead alleged father, Ernesto. Ernesto set the whole thing up so he could kill everyone involved with Isabella. Ernesto wanted Isabella dead for accidentally killing Marina. Ernesto had already poisoned and killed Isabella's mother long ago.

During the "Cruise of Deception" arc, Jack and Jennifer finally had sex on a remote island after being shipwrecked.

=== 1991–98 ===
When they got back home, Jack was still nervous about one day hurting Jennifer. He was getting used to the idea of them as a couple when he ended up killing Harper accidentally when he tried to stop Harper from shooting Steve on Steve's wedding to Kayla (Jack had been best man when Steve tried to marry Kayla after the Marina incident nullified Steve's marriage to Kayla) but the wedding was interrupted when Kayla was wrongly arrested for Marina's murder. The real killer was Isabella who had killed her sister accidentally and then blocked it from her mind.

After killing Harper, Jack was hammered by the press about his dark and dangerous past. It brought back all of his fears and self-loathing and despite counsel from Steve and Jennifer's persistent love, he pushed her away yet again, this time making her feel so hopeless that she embarked to New York on an adventure to try to protect her boarding-school best friend Katarina from an arranged marriage to Lawrence Alamain.

Jack tried to rush to New York to protect her and although the two declared their love and reunited, she refused to give up her subterfuge. In the meantime, Steve was "killed" by a bomb meant for Bo Brady, all evidence pointed to Lawrence as being behind Steve's death, because Lawrence had a vendetta against Bo from years ago when Bo helped Katarina (aka Carly Manning) get away from him when he and Katarina fought when she found out his true identity. He had tried to fool her into thinking he was someone else so that she would fall in love and marry him. Bo's interference destroyed his plans and he wanted revenge.

Jack rushed back to Salem when he found out Steve had been hurt and he spent hours at the hospital with Kayla and his mother and sister. As he grew closer to his family and began to build a better relationship to Kayla, Steve took a turn for the worse, and died. Jack then realized that you could not push the ones you loved away, as you might not ever get a chance to tell them how you really feel.

During this time, Lawrence forced Jennifer to go through the wedding by kidnapping her and her grandmother and making them go to his country. Jack flew to Lawrence's home country and he tried once again to rescue Jennifer, but he was hit on the head prior to the wedding and while he was incarcerated, Jennifer was raped by Lawrence Alamain.

Meanwhile, Frankie Brady was also being held prisoner by Lawrence as bait. He was really Katarina's brother Francoise.

Traumatized by the rape, Jennifer flinched whenever Jack tried to get close after they got back to Salem. Remembering how and why Kayla always rejected his advances, Jack began to suspect Jennifer and Frankie of having an affair when Jennifer begged Frankie to move in with her after rejecting Jack's offer to live together. Jennifer then turned down Jack's proposal, but when he came back as Santa Claus, she relented, feeling some of the old love for him. Jennifer was reeling from the rape and was having trouble dealing with the fact that Jack himself had committed rape. She was unable to tell Jack, and the misunderstandings began to mount. Every time Jennifer flinched, Jack was reminded of what went on when he was married to Kayla and begged Jennifer to tell him if she wanted out of the relationship. Jennifer refused to acknowledge that anything was wrong, and their relationship was temporarily derailed when Jennifer slapped Jack and called him a rapist when he tried to force her to kiss him to remind her of the passion between them. The kiss triggered a flashback of what happened with Lawrence, but a heartbroken Jack thought that Jennifer had finally come to her senses and begun to see that he really was a dangerous man.

Jennifer begged him to forgive her, but he was deeply hurt and ended the engagement. He ended up marrying Eve Donovan so that they could both inherit Nick Corelli's fortune. Jack needed the money to stop Lawrence (who had followed them all to Salem) from buying Diana Colville's half of the Spectator.

Jack married Eve (in name only) after seeing Jennifer and Frankie at the midtown motel. Jennifer was there to meet a source, but seeing Frankie holding a tearful Jennifer after Frankie insisted Jennifer tell him what was wrong with her, he got the wrong idea.

Jack and Jennifer were thrown together in another adventure when they were forced to share a train cabin during the Train arc where they were trying to find the murder weapon used to kill Nick Corelli. Eve was accused of killing Nick and Jack and Jennifer were trying to prove her innocence. Eve and Frankie were developing into a couple, and Jack continued to pretend he had no feelings for Jennifer left.

After a lot of hurt and misunderstandings, Jennifer finally confessed to Jack what had happened. The revelation caused him a great deal of anguish—not only because the woman he loved had been suffering so much, but because he felt that he was no better than the man who had done it to her. Jennifer finally convinced him to at least try to give their relationship a chance.

Jennifer pressed charges against Lawrence and Jack stood by her side, gaining new insight as to how he had made Kayla feel during their own trial for his rape of her. The experience brought Jack and Jennifer even closer together, aided surprisingly by Kayla who urged Jack not to let his own past prevent him from being there for Jennifer. Kayla and Shane worked with Jack and Jennifer to bring Lawrence down, and Jack admitted on the witness stand that what he had done to Kayla had truly been rape. Unlike Jack, Lawrence was convicted of marital rape and served a few years of jail time.

Jack proposed to Jennifer as soon as the trial was over and the couple finally got married in 1991. The ceremony took on a Wild West theme and the newlyweds honeymooned in Hollywood, California. They had sex on the set of a game show, conceiving their daughter Abigail. Soon after, Jack felt sure he was having a relapse of Hodgkin's Disease and set on a mission to find Jennifer a suitable new husband. Nevermind the fact that Jack was in perfect health. However, Abby developed a plastic anemia her doctors suspected the cause was environmental as many children from the same area had contracted it. In an attempt to get revenge on Victor for taking the Spectator Jack investigates him and finds out Victor is cleaning up illegally dumped toxic waste and threatens to go public with the information, Jennifer is on the same trail but because she's trying to find out what made Abby so ill. Victor faces off with Jack about the dumping only for him to drop the bomb that the business partner he was cleaning up after was Harper but that the documents approving the dumping were all signed by Jack. After finding out the truth Jack confesses his involvement to Jennifer and wrought with guilt, Jack leaves Salem leaving Jennifer alone to raise their daughter. While away Jack goes to a wellness centre called the meadows to work through some of his issues and guilt, each patient there had assumed a fake name to protect their privacy Jack was known as Clark (as in Kent), He meets and has a sexual relationship with another patient known as Monica, after feeling stable enough go back to Jennifer and Abby Jack is shocked to discover he'd been having sex with Jennifer's mother Laura who'd also gone to the meadows to recover.

Soon, smooth-talking Peter Blake entered the picture and Jennifer's heart. Peter and Jennifer married at Aremid in 1995, despite Jack's return to Salem. Jennifer didn't realize that Peter (Stefano DiMera's adopted son) had conspired to make Jennifer's mom look crazy, when Jennifer found out about Peter's shady past, she served him with divorce papers, but she refused to take Jack back, Jack suspected that Peter planned to kidnap Jennifer and Abby, and he was right, the two men struggled and Peter was presumed killed, after one glorious Christmas with Jennifer and Abby, Jack was sent to prison for Peter's murder, Jack later escaped to find Jennifer, after an alive Peter kidnapped her. When all was said and done Peter was in jail and Jack and Jennifer were back together and living in Africa with Abby.

=== 2000–07 ===
In Africa, Jennifer didn't exactly find the devoted husband and father she was hoping Jack had become. Jack, who had lost his paper and his fortune, became obsessed with the idea of making his money back and began to get himself involved in get-rich-quick schemes, many of which Jennifer found impractical and shady. To make matters worse, these business ventures would often cause Jack to disappear, sometimes for weeks at a time, without so much as a phonecall to Jennifer. Eventually deciding nothing had changed, Jennifer packed up her stuff and left with Abby one day while Jack was gone, without telling him they were going (which was first to Ireland and eventually back to Salem.)

On a tip from Jennifer's grandmother Alice Horton, Jack learned that Jennifer was to be in Paris for coronation of Princess Greta Von Amburg. Jack, who was in Italy in the time, managed to get to Paris before Jen could, and ambushed her at the coronation. There they had it out, Jennifer blasted Jack for his antics in Africa and for his stubborn refusal to grow up and begin shouldering the responsibilities expected of him as a husband, father and man while Jack expressed his outrage and Jennifer's just skulking off with their daughter without so much as a word. Eventually, after tempers calmed and they were able to discuss the problems rationally, they agreed to return to Salem where they would attempt to work out a custody agreement of Abby. Jack, however, had much more in mind. In his latest attempt to win Jennifer back, he suggested the three of them all move in together under one roof, as neither of them had a place to stay, and the stability would be good for Abigail. Jennifer protested the idea, but was goaded into when Jack suggested that if he was able to put Abby before their personal differences, she should as well. While the arrangement was initially confrontational at best, with Jack and Jennifer constantly verbally sparring with each other, eventually after Jack managed to rescue Jennifer after her car went over a bridge and comforted her after she thought the same car accident had killed the infant son of her cousin, Jennifer began to entertain the idea that perhaps Jack was really, finally, changing into the kind of man she thought he was when they were married.

Meanwhile, Jack used the attractive Princess Greta Von Amburg, with whom he struck up a friendship for purposes of his scheme to win Jennifer back, to make Jennifer jealous, which Jennifer saw immediately through. However, when Jennifer began to date the sensitive and romantic Brandon Walker, Jack was determined to continue, especially after he interpreted it as working. The plan hit a snag when Greta developed real feelings for Jack. As his heart belonged to only Jennifer, Jack tried to let her down gently, but when Greta (who had recently been dumped twice for other women) realized she was being rebuffed again, she began crying. Wanting to spare her feelings, Jack told her was gay and thus just wasn't attracted to any woman. After a few complicated (and hectic for Jack) months of trying to make Jennifer think Greta and he are involved while trying to make Greta think he's gay, eventually the truth came out to Jennifer. Jennifer was livid at Jack for playing both her and Greta for fools, and plotted to seduce Jack in the shower in an effort to catch him in his own lie. Jennifer's scheme, however, does not go according to plan as Jennifer finds herself unable to resist Jack as well. When Jack, guilty at this all this happening as a result of his deceptions, stops the interlude just short of sex, Jennifer finds herself surprisingly disappointed and very confused as to how she feels.

Not long after this, Greta finds out Jack's straight and leaves town, and Jack is now left distraction free in his, now more honest, pursuit of Jennifer. The relationship between Jennifer and Brandon eventually fizzles and Jennifer begins dating Colin Murphy a mysterious Irish man she met in Africa who she had originally gone to Ireland to meet. Briefly, Jack dated Billie Reed which made Jennifer jealous, although she refused to admit it. Jack comforted Jennifer when her cousin Hope was suspected dead which lead to a passionate embrace. But Jennifer pushed him away once again. Hurt and angry by her mixed signals and her feelings for Colin, Jack eventually put distance between them. Jennifer soon realized Colin was a con artist and that she truly loved Jack. She told Jack she wanted to get back together. He was hesitant but agreed to spend Christmas with her and Abby where they finally declared their love for one another. Colin was not happy with Jack and Jennifer getting cozy again. Jennifer overheard him threaten Jack's life. To prevent this from happening, she distracted Colin by having sex with him. Jennifer was sick with guilt when Colin told a heartbroken Jack. That same evening, Colin was murdered. Both Jack and Jennifer suspected each other (for the obvious reasons) and Jack even turned himself in to deflect suspicion off of Jennifer. Eventually the murderer turned out to be neither of them. Jennifer was dismayed once again when she suspected she was pregnant with Colin's baby. After she told Jack, he told her he would stick by her side no matter what. Thankfully, she was not and on Valentine's Day, Jennifer proposed to Jack. In May 2003, they finally remarried.

In October 2003, Jack began working with police officer Abe Carver, leading to both men supposedly being murdered by the Salem Stalker (Marlena Evans). Jennifer was forced to disconnect a brain dead Jack's life support, but she was comforted by the fact that she was now pregnant with Jack's second child.

In May 2004, it was revealed that Jack and all of Marlena's victims were alive and being held on a tropical island by Tony Dimera, who had faked all of the murders. Jennifer eventually found her way to the island, and gave birth to a son named Jack Patrick. While escaping Tony's island, Jack was again presumed dead after a tsunami, but was again Tony's prisoner in a castle, including Cassie Brady who was Jack's cellmate. During this time, despite possible temptations on either side by Patrick Lockhart (a good-looking conman working for Tony who had man who had Jennifer in his sights) and Cassie for Jack, both managed to be one of the only couples (of many) dealing with fake dead spouses who stayed true to each other. In April 2005, Jack lead another escape from the castle and he Jennifer were reunited at the bedside of a minorly injured Abigail (she had been in a car accident) and Jack got to know his infant son, Jack "J.J." Deveraux Jr.

In June 2005, Jack received news that he was dying and only had about 3 months left to live due to a rare blood disease. Instead of trying to find out more about his illness, Jack worked to set Jennifer up with her old boyfriend, Frankie Brady in order to protect her from the aforementioned Patrick, who he was sure would be after her the moment Jack was gone. Jack was again presumed dead after a car accident, although his body was never found. Jack had decided to stage his death, since he didn't want his loved ones to watch him die.

In actuality, Jack was dying in a hospice outside of Salem, and had no intention of returning to Salem. Jennifer had learned of Jack's devotion to her marrying Frankie and wanting to grant his final wish had moved on with Frankie and was (fairly unenthusiastically) preparing to marry him, despite Abigail's strong objections. Jack's plans changed when one of his hospice workers turned out to be his presumed dead brother Steve Johnson. Steve had no memory of who he was and was living under the name Nick Stockton. After confirming they were brothers by a DNA test, Jack agreed to return to Salem if Steve accompanied him.

The duo returned to Salem in spring 2006 during Jennifer and Frankie's wedding ceremony, and the brothers were reunited with their widows. Jennifer's opinions were mixed because although she was elated to find out the man she loved was alive, she was as angry at him as she'd ever been for letting her think he was dead when he wasn't. Jack continued to get worse and Jennifer was unable to break away from her commitment to Frankie, despite not truly being in love with him. She felt guilty about hurting Frankie, who was representing the stability and steadiness she had always wanted and which Jack had never really provided for her, and wary about any possibility of a future with Jack who up until now had repeatedly come in and out of her life.

Frankie found on the internet a drug trial that could help Jack, and it worked leaving Jack, Jennifer and Frankie caught up in an uncomfortable triangle. Soon after, Jack and Jennifer were kidnapped when Jack was investigating the recent murder of a cop that sparks began to fly. After escaping their captors and getting lost in the woods, Jennifer vented some of her anger out at Jack, and they eventually had sex. Jack collapsed soon afterwards due to cold and hunger and still not up to his full strength after the illness. Jack recovered however, and Jack and Jennifer were reunited for what is currently the final time. Jennifer gently let Frankie know that she cared deeply about him, but Jack had always been the love of her life, and she was going to build her life with him. Finally realizing that Jennifer never would be his, a heart-broken Frankie eventually left Salem.

The couple received great news when Jack and Jennifer were both offered dream jobs in London. Wanting a fresh start, Jack and Jennifer left for Europe with J.J. while teenaged Abigail, who supported her parents move but didn't want to leave her school and friends, remained in Salem with family.

Jack returned briefly in April 2007, when Abby and he went to New York City for her spring break. Not long after that, Abby decided to spend the summer of 2007 in England with her parents.

=== 2010–12 ===
Jennifer returned briefly to Salem in June 2010 for Alice Horton's funeral. In November 2010, she moved back to Salem but without Jack. It was explained that Jack had left on a walkabout to Australia to "find himself", much to Jennifer's chagrin. Despite significant events occurring to their family - most notably Jennifer almost dying due to her heart being removed from her body in a black-market operation - Jack has remained completely silent and out of reach of communication, with only occasional blog posts and terse e-mails existing to suggest Jack is even alive. All phone calls go unanswered and no one in Salem has seen him in almost a year.

Abigail returned in February 2011. Jennifer began dating Dr. Daniel Jonas during the summer of 2011. Jack returned to Salem on September 23, 2011. Daniel was preparing to ask Jennifer to move in with him, when an eavesdropping Jack literally fell into the cake beside them, once again reuniting the supercouple. Jack later explains to Jennifer that he was not on a walkabout, but a hostage in Afghanistan while working on a story. After realizing Jack didn't purposely leave her, Jennifer is torn between the two men who adore her: 1) the father of her children with whom she has a long history (but who is unreliable) and 2) the other who she's only known a few months but has so far done no wrong.

On March 8, 2012, Jennifer and Jack state that J.J. is currently attending boarding school. Jack dies on August 15, 2012, after being trapped inside of an elevator that fell and crashed.

=== 2015 ===
Jack and Jennifer became grandparents when Abigail gave birth to a son, Thomas Jack Deveraux, who is named after Tom Horton and Jack.

=== 2018– ===
Jack and Jennifer became grandparents again when Abigail gave birth to her second child, a daughter named Charlotte.

Jack returns on New Year's Eve alive with Eve Donovan. While Jennifer is initially elated to have the love of her life back, Jack unfortunately breaks her heart and the heart's of the rest of his family by stating he has amnesia and can not remember her or anything else about his life.

Under the influence of Eve, Jack runs for mayor and wins the race, Jack marries Eve and insists that he is in love with her, although he insists he has no interest in remembering Jenifer, he does want to remember his children so he gets Dr. Rolf's serum so he can remember, Eve destroys the serum, which angers Jack so he divorces her after seeing her true colors, Jennifer and Jack go to Chicago together to find Dr. Rolf, they take him back to Salem and he recreates the serum, but when they get back to the lab the serum is destroyed, they naturally assume it was Eve that destroyed the lab, but it was Dr. Shah who destroyed the lab and ultimately kidnapped Jennifer and held her hostage, both Jack and J.J. are very worried about Jennifer, and start looking for her, Jack gets a cryptic text from Jennifer telling where she is. But when Jack and J.J. get there it's empty, not long after Jack get a call from Dr. Shah telling him to do exactly what he says, Jack rushes to the apartment where Jennifer is being help captive, Jack and Dr. Shah fight and they both get knocked out, Jennifer rushes to Jack and asks him if he's okay, Jack looks at Jennifer as he's remembering their life together. He looks at Jennifer and says "I remember".

== See also ==
- List of supercouples
