= Jennifer Horton =

Fictional character

- Days of Our Lives character
- Melissa Reeves as Jennifer Horton
- Portrayed by: Maren Stephenson (1976–1977); Jennifer Peterson (1977–1979); Melissa Reeves (1985–1995, 2000–2022, 2024–present); Stephanie Cameron (1995–1998); Cady McClain (2020–2024)
- Duration: 1976–1979; 1985–1998; 2000–2006; 2010–present
- First appearance: February 6, 1976
- Created by: Pat Falken Smith
- Introduced by: Betty Corday (1976); Betty Corday and Al Rabin (1985); Ken Corday and Tom Langan (2000); Ken Corday and Gary Tomlin (2010); Ken Corday and Albert Alarr (2020); Ken Corday and Janet Spellman-Drucker (2024)
- Spin-off appearances: Days of Our Lives: One Stormy Night (1992); Days of Our Lives: Night Sins (1993); Days of Our Lives: Winter Heat (1994)
- Stephanie Cameron as Jennifer Horton
In-universe information
- Other names: Jennifer Alamain; Jennifer Deveraux; Jennifer Blake; Jennifer Rose Horton
- Occupation: Co-owner and editor-in-chief of The Salem Spectator; Former Director of Communications for Salem U Hospital; Former Publicist for Abe Carver's mayoral campaign Former Public relations officer at Salem U Hospital; Former Reporter; Former Talk show host Former Waitress in Ireland; Former Jail guard (with Hope Brady's credentials); Former Knife thrower's assistant Former Newspaper columnist
- Family: Horton
- Parents: Bill Horton; Laura Horton
- Brothers: Mike Horton
- Half-brothers: Lucas Horton
- Husband: Lawrence Alamain (1990–1991); Jack Deveraux (1991–1993, 2003–2011, 2019–present); Peter Blake (1995–1996); Frankie Brady (2006)
- Children: Abigail Deveraux; JJ Deveraux
- Stepdaughters: Gwen Rizczech
- Grandsons: Thomas DiMera
- Granddaughters: Charlotte DiMera
- Grandfathers: Tom Horton; James Spencer
- Grandmothers: Alice Horton; Carrie Spencer
- Uncles: Tom Horton, Jr. Mickey Horton
- Aunts: Addie Horton; Marie Horton
- Nephews: Jeremy Horton; Will Horton
- Nieces: Allie Horton
- First cousins: Julie Olson Williams; Steven Olson; Sandy Horton; Hope Williams Brady; Melissa Horton (adoptive); Sarah Horton (legal)

Jennifer Horton is a fictional character from the Peacock soap opera Days of Our Lives, played by actress Melissa Reeves. Jennifer was created by scriptwriter Pat Falken Smith, and executive producer Betty Corday. The role has also been portrayed by Maren Stephenson, Jennifer Peterson, Stephanie Cameron, Cady McClain and Marci Miller.

Jennifer's storylines often focus on love and romance. The daughter of Bill and Laura Horton, she is a member of the original core family, the Hortons. Despite beginning as a rebellious teenager, she has transformed into a true soap heroine. Jennifer is known for her popular pairing with Jack Deveraux, most notably portrayed by Matthew Ashford. The pairing of Jack and Jennifer, known as "J&J" to soap fans, has become one of the soaps' most infamous supercouples. McClain's performance in the role earned her the Daytime Emmy Award for Outstanding Guest Performer in a Drama Series in 2021.

== Development ==
=== Background ===
Jennifer Horton is one of the earliest characters to be invented by executive producer Betty Corday, and scriptwriter Pat Falken Smith. The character was brought on as part of the soap's core family, the Hortons. She is the daughter of established characters Bill and Laura Horton, and the mother of Abigail and JJ Deveraux

=== Casting ===
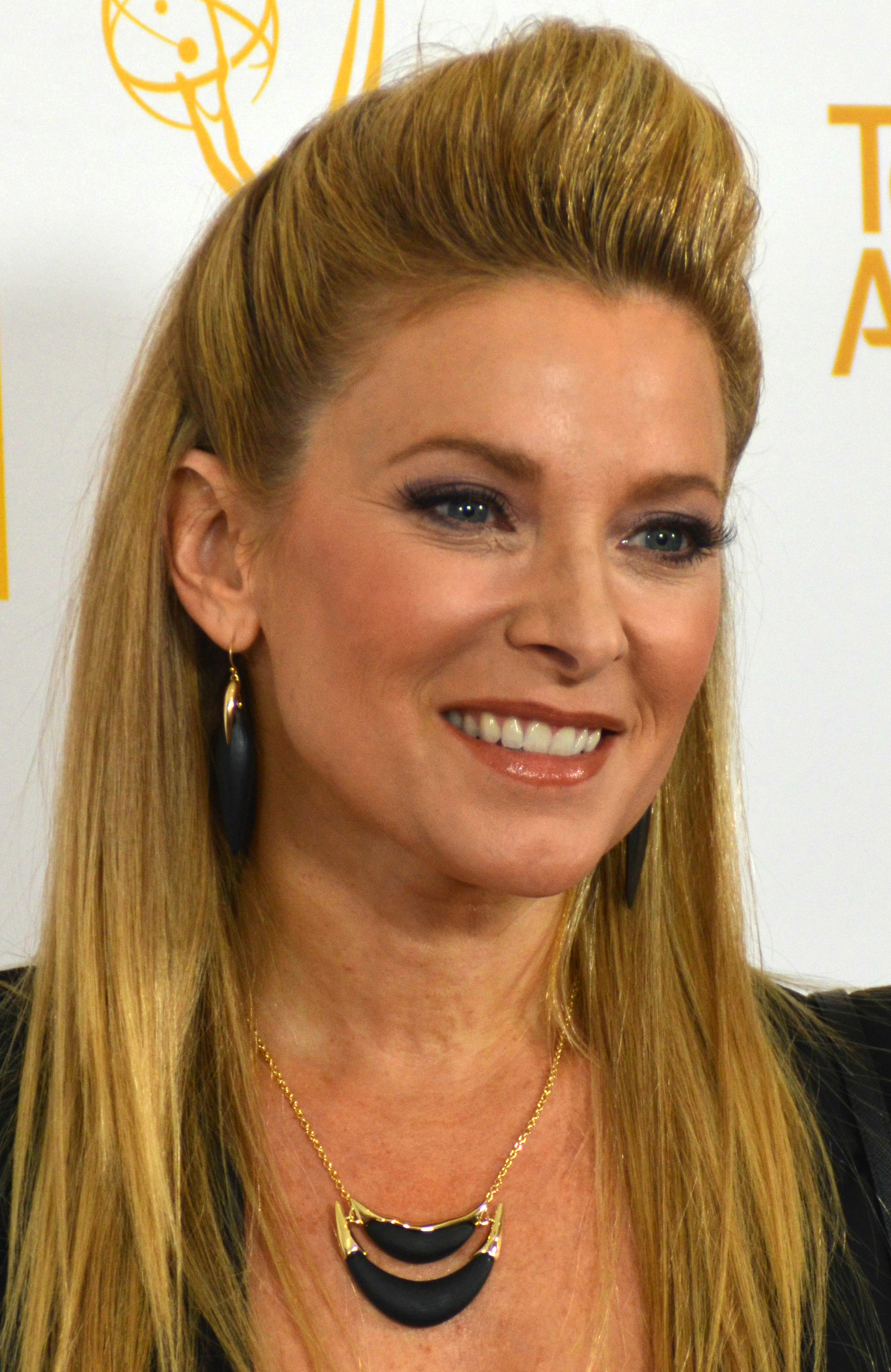
Actress Cady McClain was cast as Jennifer in 2020.

As Jennifer is introduced on February 9, 1976, the role was originated by child actress Maren Stephenson until August 8, 1977. For storyline purposes, the role is briefly taken over by Jennifer Peterson from December 1, 1977, to July 4, 1979, until the character was written out of the show when her mother, Laura Horton, was in a psychiatric facility, thus and would not be able to care for her.

On October 9, 1985, the character was re-introduced with Santa Barbara actress Melissa Reeves in the role. She proved to be a fan favorite and younger leading heroine. Her relationship with Jack Deveraux prompted the couple to be pronounced a supercouple for the daytime drama. Reeves stayed with the serial until she abruptly quit on December 15, 1995, at the insistence of her husband, Scott Reeves. To replace Reeves, the show brought on Stephanie Cameron as Jennifer on December 18, 1995. Cameron portrayed the character until she was written off the show on June 5, 1998.

In early 2000, rumors started swirling that Melissa Reeves would be returning to the show, due to the series crumbling to fill the void left by the departures of front-burner cast members Vivian Alamain, played by Louise Sorel and Eric Brady, played by Jensen Ackles. Her return was officially announced in April 2000. Reeves returned to work and began airing shortly after on October 6. After six years on the serial, Reeves departed again on September 21, 2006, to spend time with her family. The show's matriarch, Frances Reid who played Alice Horton died of old age on February 3, 2010. Reeves was invited back for her onscreen tribute on June 10 of that same year. Reeves remained in a recurring guest star role until July 6. It was announced later that month that Reeves would return permanently in the role beginning on November 12.

In September 2020, it was announced Cady McClain had been temporarily cast in the role, replacing Reeves—who opted not to commute from Tennessee to California—due to the on-going COVID-19 pandemic in the United States. Reeves last appeared on October 13, with McClain debuting on October 20. On February 2, 2021, Marci Miller briefly portrayed Jennifer in newly-created flashbacks. McClain exited the role on February 17. She briefly reappeared on April 30 of that year. Later that in year, it was announced that Reeves would be returning, and she returned on December 24, 2021.

In April 2024, it was announced Reeves would reprise the role; her return debuted on November 28.

== Storylines ==
=== 1976–2006 ===
Jennifer Rose Horton is born during a snowstorm in 1976. In 1979, her mother's mental state deteriorates and she puts little Jennifer Rose in danger by putting her on a bus alone. In 1985, Jennifer returns to Salem as a teenager in deep trouble who dressed in a style similar to Madonna at the time. She has become a rebellious runaway, is a compulsive liar, and is being stalked by a rapist. Her brother Mike Horton comes to her rescue. By the following year she gives up on her runaway lifestyle and moves back in with her grandparents, Tom and Alice Horton. During the summer of 1986, she begins a non-intimate romance with a high school classmate Glenn Gallagher. However, Jennifer inadvertently exposes Glenn's plan to uncover his coach's drug dealing. Jennifer trails Glenn to the park and finds the coach holding a gun to Glenn's head. Jennifer then enlists the help of classmate Frankie Brady. Later, when on a class trip, Jennifer and Frankie discover they have feelings for one another. Jennifer rejects Glenn's pressure to have sex and turns to Frankie. Together, Jennifer and Frankie foil a robbery attempt and help bust a prostitution ring. In 1987, Jennifer's father Bill returns to Salem and tries running Jennifer's life. Jennifer rebels by becoming engaged to Frankie; however, she breaks the engagement when she learns of her mother and grandmother's mental problems, thinking she'd develop the same problems and pass them on to her own children. They reunite briefly, but Eve Donovan (who has a crush on Frankie) spills the beans about an affair Frankie had while separated from Jennifer.

In 1989, Jennifer becomes an intern reporter at the Salem Spectator, working under the tutelage of publisher Jack Deveraux. She befriends Sally, a pregnant homeless girl who gets herself arrested so she won't have her baby on the streets. But the officials won't let Sally keep her baby once it was born. Jack pretends to be Jennifer's husband, and they offer the child Hannah a foster home. Jack soon falls in love with Jennifer, but Emilio soon comes to town. Although Emilio pulls away from Jennifer when she is threatened by the gang Emilio once belonged to, Jennifer soon finds herself torn between Emilio and Jack. When Jack hides his feelings for Jennifer, she then becomes engaged to Emilio. Desperate to keep Jennifer from marrying Emilio, Jack kidnaps her on her wedding day. When Jennifer escapes, she falls off a cliff and was knocked unconscious. Jack finally pours his heart out to her. Later, Jack becomes insecure about his feelings for Jennifer, so she returns to Emilio. During the Cruise Of Deception, however, Jack saves Jennifer's life, and they make love for the first time. Later, Lawrence Alamain comes to town. Jennifer believes that Lawrence thinks she is Katerina, the heiress to the Von Leuschner fortune, due to a confusion going back to when the real heiress (Carly Manning) and Jennifer were teenagers and they had switched dates. After a hurried wedding, Lawrence rapes Jennifer, admitting that he knew her real identity all along. Jack arrives to rescue Jennifer. Jack and Jennifer became engaged, but he calls off the wedding because he feels alienated from her. Jennifer is still unable to handle intimacy and is too ashamed to tell Jack that Lawrence raped her. Jack then marries Eve to help her get her hands on her $10 million inheritance. After Jennifer finally tells Jack the truth, she presses rape charges against Lawrence. Kimberly and Jack are able to record him confessing to the rape, and Lawrence is then sent to jail. Eve reluctantly grants Jack a divorce, and Jack and Jennifer are married. Soon after, a swindler named Hawk soon cheats them out of their money. He is caught, but the couple remains penniless. Jennifer then learns she is pregnant, but Jack's joy is not great. He thinks he is suffering a relapse of Hodgkin's disease. Though he is not ill, Jennifer goes to New York to do a TV show with Calliope. Jennifer gives birth later that year to a daughter, Abigail Johanna.

The following year, Abigail is diagnosed with aplastic anemia. Jennifer teams up with Austin Reed to find the environmental cause of Abigail's illness. It is soon revealed that Jack was the one who had allowed the toxic waste dumping and was responsible for Abigail's illness. Overwhelmed with guilt, Jack leaves Salem and Jennifer behind. Jennifer begins dating Peter Blake after Jack is gone. Peter is involved with drug trafficking at the time. Jack returns to Salem and spies on his ex-wife and her current love. Jennifer begins to try to find a man named Clark, who her mom had feelings for. It turns out that Clark is actually Jack. Jennifer is devastated and goes through with her marriage to Peter. Jack tries continuously to prove that Peter is devious but to no avail. A year later, Jennifer and Peter separate when she finds out he lied to her. Jack catches Peter with a syringe meant for Jennifer so that Peter can drug her and then take her and Abigail out of the country. Jack ends up shooting Peter, and it looks like Peter has died after Stefano switches Peter's alive body with the dead body of an old associate wearing a Peter mask. Jack is sentenced to serving life in prison for the death of Peter, and Jennifer vows her eternal love for Jack every day. Jack breaks out of jail and takes Jen with him to evade police. They all are on the run for a while, until they join up with a circus. Jack becomes a laborer and Jen the assistant with Abby. Eventually, Jack and Jennifer flee for Africa. While in Africa, Jennifer and Jack experience some problems with their relationship, especially when Jennifer falls for a young man named Colin Murphy.

Jennifer flees to Ireland with Abby, where she ends up getting herself in trouble, and then has to come back to Salem with Bo. Jack soon follows her, and the two move in together so they can look after Abigail. Jennifer initially pushes Jack away and concentrates on relationships, first with Brandon then Colin, but she and Jack cannot resist that certain something that has always been between them. They are remarried, much to the delight of Abby. Jack and Jennifer are just beginning to enjoy their married life together again and hosting "In the House," a show that was a wedding gifts from Jennifer's father Bill to her and Jack. Jack is struck down in an alley behind Salem Place by the Salem Stalker, and Jennifer is forced to make the choice of taking him off life support and donating his organs. Abby is unable to forgive her mother until Jennifer realizes she is pregnant, but tragedy strikes again when Jennifer learns that her baby will have serious mental and physical deformities, and Lexie advises her to terminate. Desperate to hold on to the last part of Jack she would ever have, Jennifer refuses to terminate her pregnancy. With the help of her new tenant and friend, Patrick Lockhart, Jennifer begins looking forward to a new life with Abby and the baby. When she is nearly full term, Jennifer gets a message on her computer, supposedly from Jack, and takes off to find him. She is picked up by a pilot who was to take her to the island of Melaswen. Unfortunately, the plane crashes, and Jennifer ends up in the jungle. She is thrilled when she reunited with Jack, and together the two begin planning a future for Jack Patrick Jr. (who is delivered by Patrick), but when they try to return to Salem, Jack is presumed dead on the return voyage. Jennifer tries to move on with her life, but finds it difficult because Abby can't forgive Jennifer for Jack's death. Jennifer is almost preparing to move on when a miracle occurs and Jack is back home for real. Together, Jack and Jennifer work on rebuilding their family, which is complete now that Abby are getting along much better with her mother. The two get a job offer for London, and Jack and Jennifer leave for London with baby Jack.

=== 2010–present ===
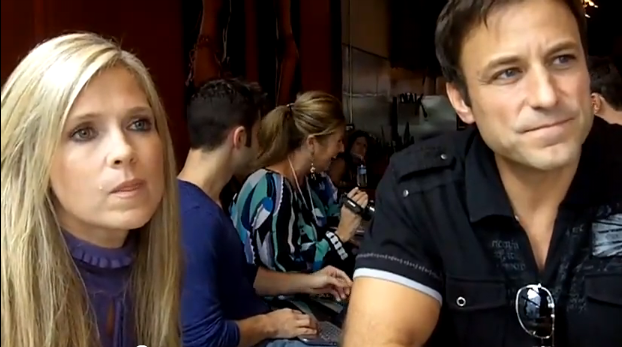
Ty Treadway has played a part in Jennifer's return storyline in 2010.

In June 2010, Jennifer returns to Salem after receiving the news that her grandmother, Alice Horton, is very ill and does not have much time left. Jennifer gets to say goodbye to her "Gram", but is distraught as one of the closest people to her and the woman that raised her died. While in Salem, Jennifer tries to provide guidance to Bo and Hope, inferring that she thinks it is best if they reconcile. She also gets to reunite with her old friend, Carly Manning, who she had not seen in years. Jennifer leaves Salem after Alice's funeral and after an altercation with Vivian Alamain, and returns to London to be with her family. She, however, returns to Salem in November of that same year to help Hope, who was in prison after confessing to the Salem Muggings.

Hope refuses to let Jennifer help her as she is determined to pay for her crimes. The women's prison that Hope is staying at, however, is trafficking human organs that came from dead inmates, and the doctor that Jennifer had been seeing at the time is helping Warden Jane and the DiMera family. After Bo helps Hope escape for the jail after being nearly beaten to death, Jennifer uses her journalism background to get a job at the prison to try and save Hope and expose the illegal scam at the prison. Warden Jane and Lee, however, discover Jennifer's true motives, and removes Jennifer's heart from her body with the intention of giving it to Dr. Walters to save a patient at the hospital. Melanie Layton and Dr. Daniel Jonas are informed of Jennifer's condition and rush to save her. Daniel ends up putting Jennifer's heart back into her chest and saves her life. This begins a flirtatious relationship between the two. Meanwhile, Jennifer's daughter Abigial, returns home to Salem to be with her mother. Without hearing a word from her husband Jack, Jennifer decides it is best if she divorces Jack and moves on with her life. After the divorce is finalized and after flirting for months, Jennifer and Daniel began to date, much to the dismay of Jennifer and Daniel's good friend, Dr. Carly Manning. In July 2011, Jennifer discovered that Carly had been using drugs and had become addicted due to her life falling apart and Jennifer being with Daniel, the man she feels she wants to love. Jennifer and Daniel end up getting Carly medical help. Carly, along with her son, Nicholas, leave Salem to go to Europe.

As Jennifer and Daniel fall deeper in love, Jack unexpectedly returns to Salem. Although Jennifer and Abby are upset at his absence, he reveals that he was held prisoner in Afghanistan while covering the opium trade there, and that a British friend he had there was killed, giving him PTSD. Wanting to support him, Jennifer gets closer to Jack, and the two realize that they still love each other. Unable to make a choice between Daniel and Jack, Daniel breaks up with Jennifer and leaves Salem. Jennifer helps Abe with his campaign for mayor, though they lose to EJ DiMera. Jennifer eventually wins Jack's heart, and the two get engaged. When Daniel returns, Jennifer asks him if they can be friends, and he tells her they can, while he begins a secret romance with Nicole Walker. When the tunnels explode underneath Salem, Jack saves Abby from being trapped in a broken elevator. The elevator, with Jack inside, plunges several stories, causing Jack to die. Distraught, Abby and Jennifer scatter his ashes off the shores of northern California. Broken, Jennifer allows a pregnant Nicole to live with her, in order to keep Daniel happy and so that Victor Kiriakis doesn't have to let her live with him. Nicole reveals her relationship with Daniel, which makes Jennifer uneasy and argumentative with Nicole. Jennifer tells Nicole that she must leave after she gives birth. After Nicole sees a close moment between Daniel and Jennifer and later loses her baby, she gets in a fight with Jennifer, ending with Nicole falling down some stairs and "miscarrying." Nicole blames Jennifer for the fall, but the truth is revealed that Nicole knew her baby died but was keeping it a secret so that Daniel would take her to Hawaii. Knowing that Daniel will love Jennifer and will never love Nicole, Nicole apologizes for her wrongdoings and leaves the duo alone. Daniel agrees to still be her friend, and he and Jennifer forgive her, not pressing charges. Daniel saves Jennifer's life after, admitting that he loves her, by removing her appendix before it bursts, with Nicole's help. Jennifer admits to Daniel, while the surgery goes on, that she loves him. She forgets afterwards, however, but is glad that Daniel's hand tremors are gone thanks to the treatment she found for him. Later, she remembers what she told him, and, with Abigail, says goodbye to her old life with Jack. Daniel and Jennifer reunite with nearly everyone's blessing, but Jennifer's half brother, Lucas Horton, doesn't approve of the reunion due to his bitter past with Daniel. On New Year's Eve, Daniel and Jennifer share a kiss and spend the night together.

Chloe Lane returns to Salem. She had previously given birth to a son, whom she had named Parker Jonas. The supposed truth came out at Parker's baptism in front of family and friends that Philip Kiriakis was Parker's father, leading to the end of the marriage between Chloe and Daniel. Having lost him, Chloe sank into a state of post partum depression and tried to commit suicide. Upon returning to Salem in January 2013, Chloe attempts to reestablish her relationship with Daniel, revealing to Daniel that Parker really is his son and that the earlier supposed DNA test results had been fake. Hoping she could get Daniel back, Chloe blackmails Jennifer into rejecting Daniel by threatening to keep Daniel from seeing Parker. Chloe goes so far as to have her mother Nancy prepare to take Parker to Brazil without telling Daniel, so Jennifer felt she had to publicly reject Daniel and leave the hospital to protect Daniel from losing access to his son while never revealing her true feelings.

After seeing a passport at Chloe's mother Nancy's place, Daniel figured out Chloe's scheme, with help from Rafe, and reconciles with Jennifer, who also got her job back at the hospital. Chloe said she repents and leaves town for treatment, leaving Parker with Daniel and Jennifer. Jennifer is delighted when JJ returns to Sale, now a teenager.

Jennifer is devastated by Daniel's death in 2016. In late 2017, Jennifer begins a relationship with Eric Brady. The two later get engaged but Eric breaks it off when he learns she knew where Nicole Walker was for a couple of months. Shortly after at a New Years party, Jack returns, but does not reconcile with Jennifer due to having amnesia and being manipulated by Eve. Eve and Jack later marry, much to Jennifer's dismay. However, when Jack recovers his memories, he divorces Eve and remarries Jennifer. Shortly after, Jennifer is pushed off a balcony by Gina Von Amberg, who is posing as Hope, so that Jennifer doesn't reveal her true identity. This puts Jennifer into a coma for a whole year, and when she wakes up, she clears Eve's name, who had been in prison for pushing her. Jennifer and Jack later support Abigail when she begins having hallucinations.

== Reception ==
The character of Jennifer has been well received by critics, with Reeves' long-running portrayal regarded as "being one of the most beloved" in the series. Reeves received several award nominations and wins for her portrayal of Jennifer. In 1995, she received a Soap Opera Digest award for Hottest Female Star. Reeves's performance has been met with critical acclaim, having garnered her Daytime Emmy Award nomination for Outstanding Younger Actress in a Drama Series in 1992 and Outstanding Supporting Actress in a Drama Series in 2016. At the 48th Daytime Emmy Awards, McClain earned an Emmy win in the category of Outstanding Guest Performer in a Drama Series for the role of Jennifer.

In 2020, Charlie Mason from Soaps She Knows placed Jennifer 27th on their list of the 35 most memorable characters from Days of Our Lives, commenting "They broke the "good girl" mold after fashioning from it Melissa Reeves' spunky, halo-clad heroine. But we can't deny we've always been more drawn to the dark side... and scamps like the one who'd be delighted to know that she beat her nemesis to come in at No. 26 [ Eve Donovan ]." Mason also referred to Jennifer as a "saint".

== See also ==
- Jack and Jennifer
- Supercouple
