= Matthew Ashford =

American actor and producer (born 1960)

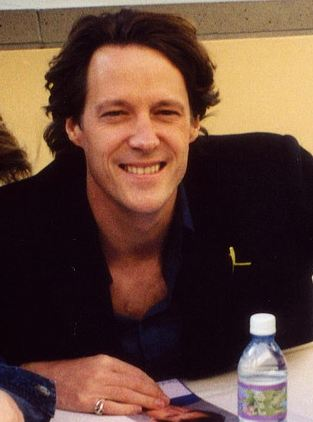
- Ashford in 2007
- Born: Matthew Nile Ashford; January 29, 1960 (age 66); Davenport, Iowa, U.S.
- Education: University of North Carolina School of the Arts (BFA)
- Occupations: Actor; producer
- Years active: 1982–present
- Spouses: Christina Saffran (m. 1987; div. 2012) Lana Buss (m. 2016)
- Children: 4

Matthew Nile Ashford (born January 29, 1960) is an American actor and producer. He is known for playing the role of Jack Deveraux on the NBC Daytime soap opera Days of Our Lives for various stints since 1987. In 2012, he was nominated for a Daytime Emmy Award for Outstanding Supporting Actor in a Drama Series for his role on Days of Our Lives. He has also won five Soap Opera Digest Awards. He stars as Steve Jensen on the web series The Bay (2010 to 2023). He is also a producer on the series, which has won multiple Daytime Emmy Awards. In 2017, he was nominated for a Daytime Emmy Award for Outstanding Supporting or Guest Actor in a Digital Daytime Drama Series for his work on The Bay. Ashford has also produced several films.

== Early life ==
Ashford was born in Davenport, Iowa. His father was a civil engineer and his mother was an executive secretary. He is the sixth of eight children, with three sisters and four brothers. Ashford is of Irish descent. His sisters got him involved in acting when they joined junior theater classes and workshops in Iowa, eventually bringing him along.

His family moved from Iowa to Fairfax, Virginia when he was thirteen years old. He attended Hayfield Secondary School, where he starred in school plays. He also acted in local theater. After graduation, he enrolled at the University of North Carolina School of the Arts in Winston-Salem, North Carolina, where he earned a Bachelor of Fine Arts degree in theater. During his college years, Ashford worked as a street performer in Myrtle Beach, South Carolina and joined the Ragamuffin Magic and Mime Company.

== Career ==
=== 1982–1986: Early work ===
After graduating from college, Ashford moved to New York City. In 1982, he was cast as Drew Ralston on One Life to Live. He stayed on the show until 1983, when the character of Drew was killed off.

Ashford was cast on The Hamptons, a 1983 summer replacement series, but he had to turn down the job because he was still under contract with One Life to Live. He joined a touring company production of The Member of the Wedding, co-starring with Esther Rolle. In 1984, Ashford was cast as Cagney McCleary on Search for Tomorrow. He played the role until the show's cancellation in December 1986.

=== 1987–1999: Days of Our Lives and General Hospital ===
In 1987, Ashford joined the cast of the NBC soap opera Days of Our Lives, playing Jack Deveraux. The part had previously been played by James Acheson. The character of Jack was initially written as a villain and raped Kayla Brady. After Ashford began playing the role, the character was redeemed. He was paired romantically with Jennifer Horton (Melissa Reeves). In 1989, Ashford won a Soap Opera Digest Award for Outstanding Villain. In 1991, he and Melissa Reeves won a Soap Opera Digest Award for Outstanding Super Couple: Daytime. In 1992, they won Soap Opera Digest Awards for Best Love Story and Best Wedding.

Ashford played Jack Deveraux in the Days of Our Lives television film One Stormy Night (1992). He guest starred on Quantum Leap. He played Jack Deveraux in another Days of Our Lives television film, Night Sins (1993). Ashford won a Soap Opera Digest Award for Outstanding Comic Performance. In September 1993, he left Days of Our Lives when the producers decided not to renew his contract. The role was recast with Mark Valley in 1994 and Steve Wilder in 1997.

Ashford was cast as Tom Hardy on General Hospital, first airing on February 17, 1995. The part had previously been played by David Wallace. Ashford won the role without an audition. He appeared in the science fiction film Species (1995). He guest starred on Burke's Law. He left General Hospital in 1997 and guest starred on Pacific Blue. Ashford played Whitey in the romantic comedy film Billy's Hollywood Screen Kiss (1998). He guest starred on Charmed and Providence. He played Ron in the action film Paper Bullets (1999).

=== 2000–2008: Days return ===
In December 2000, it was announced that Ashford would be returning to Days of Our Lives as Jack Deveraux. His first airdate was February 6, 2001. He also guest starred on Dharma & Greg in 2001. He stayed on Days of Our Lives until October 2003, when Jack was murdered by a serial killer called The Salem Stalker. In 2003, Ashford guest starred as himself on Friends.

In October 2003, it was reported that Ashford would return to One Life to Live on a recurring basis as a new character, Stephen Haver. His first airdate was December 10, 2003. Stephen, a college professor, was discovered to be a serial murderer known as the Music Box Killer. Ashford left the show when the character was killed off in February 2004. In 2004, Ashford returned to Days of Our Lives when it was revealed that The Salem Stalker's victims, including Jack, were alive and being held captive on a tropical island. Ashford left the show again on September 21, 2006.

In September 2006, he played Senator Fipp in Urinetown at the Matrix Theatre in Los Angeles. Ashford returned to Days of Our Lives for a short time in April 2007. In May 2007, Ashford played Mike in No Strings at the Freud Playhouse in Los Angeles. He co-starred with Scott Bakula. He played Father Michael in the horror film Chronicles of an Exorcism (2008). He was also one of the film's producers. In July 2008, Ashford played Frank Butler in Annie Get Your Gun at the Benedum Center in Pittsburgh. In July 2009, he played Sky Masterson in Guys and Dolls at the Wells Fargo Pavilion in Sacramento.

=== 2010–2013: The Bay ===
From February to June 2010, he played Bill Austin in the North American tour of Mamma Mia!. The final performances were cut short due to security concerns with the G20 Summit in Toronto, which was held nearby. He guest starred on 90210. He began playing the role of Steve Jensen on the web series The Bay, co-starring with his former Days of Our Lives castmate Mary Beth Evans. Ashford is also a producer on the series, which has received multiple Daytime Emmy Awards.

He appeared in the science fiction short film The Historian Paradox (2011). In April 2011, he starred as the male lead in Antony and Cleopatra at the Mesa Arts Center. He co-starred with Lana Buss.

Ashford returned to Days of Our Lives, first airing September 23, 2011. He was nominated for a Daytime Emmy Award for Outstanding Supporting Actor in a Drama Series for his work on Days. In April 2012, it was announced that he had been dismissed from his role on Days, along with three other actors. His last airdate was August 15, 2012, when Jack seemingly died when an elevator crashed with him inside.

In September 2012, Ashford played Franklin Hart Jr. in the musical 9 to 5 at the Ogunquit Playhouse in Maine. He co-starred with Sally Struthers. He appeared on the web series Outside the Box. He played Chris Valentine in the film Fuzz Track City (2012). He played Dr. Stringer in the film Bad Blood (2012). Ashford starred as Coach Loren DeJong in Winning Favor (2012), a film based on the true story of a group of friends in Iowa who became basketball players. He appeared in the television film The Good Mother (2013). Ashford and his former Days co-star Deidre Hall guest starred on the web series Dating in the Middle Ages.

=== 2015–present ===
In November 2015, it was announced that he would return to Days of Our Lives as the ghost of Jack, airing in a 2016 episode. He made another return as a ghost in December 2017. In 2017, Ashford was nominated for a Daytime Emmy Award for Outstanding Supporting or Guest Actor in a Digital Daytime Drama Series for his work on The Bay. He played Valentine in the action film The Fuzz.

In November 2018, it was announced that Ashford would be returning to Days of Our Lives as a regular cast member. Jack returned from the dead in the New Year's Eve episode. In 2020, Ashford guest starred on NCIS. He left Days of Our Lives in March 2023, but he returned on a recurring basis in 2024.

== Personal life ==
Ashford met singer-actress Christina Saffran in 1985, when he auditioned for the World Peace Festival, a production she was choreographing. They were married on June 6, 1987. They have since divorced. They have two daughters, born in 1992 and 1997.

In 1998, their youngest daughter, Emma Ashford, was diagnosed with retinoblastoma. She received chemotherapy. She is now healthy and working as an actress. Because of his daughter's illness, Ashford helped form Retinoblastoma International. He is a spokesperson for the organization.

In May 2010, while on tour in Toronto, he obtained U.S.-Canadian dual citizenship. Ashford's father was born in Canada, which made him and his siblings eligible to become Canadians without relinquishing their American citizenship.

Ashford met actress Lana Buss when they played the title roles in a stage production of Antony and Cleopatra in 2011. They were married in November 2016. They have a son, born in May 2013, and a daughter, born in December 2015.

== Filmography ==
=== Film ===
Year	Title	Role	Notes
1995	Species	Guy in Club	
1998	Billy's Hollywood Screen Kiss	Whitey	
1999	Paper Bullets	Ron	
2006	Deceit	Michael	Video
2006	Social Security Guard	Hugh	Short film
2008	Chronicles of an Exorcism	Father Michael	Also producer and writer
2011	The Historian Paradox	Thomas	Short film
2012	Fuzz Track City	Chris Valentine	
2012	Winning Favor	Coach Loren DeJong	
2012	Bad Blood	Dr. Stringer	
2012	Catch of a Lifetime	Billy Joe Crawley	Also producer
2012	Hi Mitch	Phil	Short film
2016	The Unlikely's	Brock Chapman	Also producer
2017	The Fuzz	Valentine	
2021	Blood Runs Thick	Marshall	
2022	Spirit	Pops	Also executive producer

=== Television ===
Year	Title	Role	Notes
1982–1983	One Life to Live	Drew Ralston	Contract role
1984–1986	Search for Tomorrow	Cagney McCleary	Contract role
1987–1993, 2001–2007, 2011–2012, 2016–2017, 2018–2023, 2024	Days of Our Lives	Jack Deveraux	Contract role (1987–1993, 2001–2006, 2011–2012, 2018–2023); Guest role (2007, 2016–2017, 2024)
1992	One Stormy Night	Jack Deveraux	Television film
1992	Quantum Leap	TV Husband	Episodes: "It's a Wonderful Leap – May 10, 1958" (Uncredited), "Moments to Live – May 4, 1985"
1993	Night Sins	Jack Deveraux	Television film
1995	Burke's Law	Harold 'Spider' Arthur	Episode: "Who Killed the Tennis Ace?"
1995–1997	General Hospital	Tom Hardy	Contract role
1997	Pacific Blue	Thomas Leffler; Antonio; Ted Miller; Jeff Armstrong	Episode: "Soul Mate"
1998	Charmed	Roger	Episodes: "Unaired Pilot", "Something Wicca This Way Comes"
1999	Providence	Mr. Henderson	Episode: "Home for the Holidays" Credited as Matthew N. Ashford
2001	Dharma & Greg	Trey	Episode: "Dharma Does Dallas" Credited as Matthew N. Ashford
2003	Friends	Himself	Episode: "The One with the Soap Opera Party"
2003–2004	One Life to Live	Dr. Stephen Haver	Recurring role
2010	90210	Peter Upton	Episode: "2021 Vision"
2013	The Good Mother	Peter	Television film
2016–2017	This Just In	Dr. Majishon	3 episodes
2020	NCIS	Rick Martel	Episode: "Schooled"

=== Web series ===
Year	Title	Role	Notes
2010–2023	The Bay	Steve Jensen	75 episodes Also producer
2012	Outside the Box	Dirty Harry	Episode: "Dirty Harry"
2013	Dating in the Middle Ages	Nick Hamilton; Medieval Captain	2 episodes

== Awards and nominations ==
Year	Award	Category	Title	Result	Ref.
1989	Soap Opera Digest Award	Outstanding Daytime Villain	Days of Our Lives	Won	
1991	Soap Opera Digest Award	Favorite Daytime Super Couple (shared with Melissa Reeves)	Days of Our Lives	Won	
1992	Soap Opera Digest Award	Best Daytime Wedding (shared with Melissa Reeves)	Days of Our Lives	Won	
1992	Soap Opera Digest Award	Best Love Story Daytime or Primetime (shared with Melissa Reeves)	Days of Our Lives	Won	
1993	Soap Opera Digest Award	Outstanding Comic Performance	Days of Our Lives	Won	
2012	Daytime Emmy Award	Outstanding Supporting Actor in a Drama Series	Days of Our Lives	Nominated	
2017	Daytime Emmy Award	Outstanding Supporting or Guest Actor in a Digital Daytime Drama Series	The Bay	Nominated	

== See also ==
- Days of Our Lives
- Jack Deveraux and Jennifer Horton

Preceded by David Wallace	Tom Hardy (role); 1995–97	None
