= Theo Carver =

Fictional character

- Days of Our Lives character
- Tyler Joseph Andrews as Theo Carver
- Portrayed by: Chase and Tyler Johnson (2003–2004); Kavi Faquir (2006–2007); Amyrh Harris (2007); Terrell Ransom Jr. (2008–2015); Kyler Pettis (2015–2018); Cameron Johnson (2020–2023); Tyler Joseph Andrews (2025–present); Tajh Bellow (2026)
- Duration: 2003–2004; 2006–2018; 2020–2023; 2025–present
- First appearance: May 29, 2003
- Created by: Dena Higley
- Introduced by: Ken Corday and Stephen Wyman (2003–2006); Ken Corday and Edward J. Scott (2007–2008); Ken Corday, Greg Meng, and Albert Alarr (2015); Ken Corday and Albert Alarr (2020); Ken Corday and Janet Spellman (2025); Ken Corday and Noel Maxam (2026)
- Kyler Pettis as Theo Carver

- Terrell Ransom Jr. as Theo Carver
In-universe information
- Other names: Theodore Brandon Carver
- Occupation: Businessman
- Family: DiMera
- Parents: Abe Carver; Lexie Carver
- Stepmother: Paulina Price
- Half-brothers: Brandon Walker
- Half-sisters: Lani Price (adoptive)
- Grandparents: Benjamin Carver; Rita Carver; Stefano DiMera; Celeste Perrault; Grace Brooks (adoptive)
- Uncles: André DiMera; Tony DiMera (legal); Benjy Hawk; Theo Carver; Jonah Carver; Peter Blake (adoptive); Stefan DiMera; Jake Lambert; EJ DiMera; Cameron Davis; Chad DiMera
- Aunts: Kristen DiMera (adoptive); Renée DuMonde; Megan Hathaway; Grace Jeffries (adoptive)
- Nephews: David Grant (adoptive); Carver Grant (adoptive); Trey DiMera (step)
- Nieces: Jules Grant (adoptive)
- First cousins: Dimitri Von Leuschner; Jett Carver; Steven Hawk; Johnny DiMera; Sydney DiMera; Grace Brady; Thomas DiMera; Charlotte DiMera; Rachel Black (adoptive)

Theo Carver is a fictional character from Days of Our Lives, an American soap opera on the NBC network. Created under head writer Dena Higley, Theo was born onscreen in 2003. The character was portrayed by two sets of twins and three child actors, Chase and Tyler Johnson (2003–2004), Kavi Faquir (2006–2007), Amyrh Harris (2007), Terrell Ransom Jr. from (2008-2015), Kyler Pettis (2015–2018), Cameron Johnson (2020–2023). Along with several other child characters, Theo was rapidly aged in November 2015 and Pettis stepped into the role. Pettis announced his departure from the series in 2017 and he vacated the role in 2018. After a two-year absence, Theo was recast when Johnson took over the role in 2020; he remained in the role until 2023. The character returned in September 2025, with Tyler Joseph Andrews assuming the role.

Theo is the only child of Salem's mayor Abe Carver (James Reynolds) and Doctor Lexie Carver (Renée Jones). At the time of his birth, Lexie had been having an affair with her stepson Brandon Walker (Matt Cedeño) and his paternity is in question. DNA testing ultimately confirms Abe as Theo's father and he is named after Abe's late brother Theo and Brandon. In 2008, the three-year-old Theo is diagnosed with Autism when the network partners with Autism Speaks. As a teenager, Theo struggles to accept Abe's first attempt at romance after Lexie's 2012 passing with Valerie Grant (Vanessa Williams) and he is romantically linked to his childhood best friend Ciara Brady (Vivian Jovanni) and later her niece Claire (Olivia Rose Keegan). In 2017, the unarmed Theo is shot by rookie police officer JJ Deveraux (Casey Moss) which leaves him paralyzed and leads to him being written out of the series when he relocates to South Africa for treatment.

Theo's autism diagnosis proved to be the character's most significant storyline as well as his close friendship with Ciara Brady. Ransom was beloved by fans and critics and also earned two Young Artist Award nominations for his portrayal of Theo. Pettis also became quite popular with viewers and critics for his portrayal of the autistic character. While the writing for Theo's shooting was polarizing, Pettis won the Daytime Emmy Award for Outstanding Younger Actor in a Drama Series for his portrayal of Theo in 2019.

== Casting ==
The role was originated by uncredited child actors on May 29, 2003, until August 26, 2003. The role was then shared by 7 month old twins, Chase and Tyler Johnson. The Johnsons appeared from September 8, 2003, until November 26, 2004. After a two-year absence, Theo was played by Kavi Faquir from April 14, 2006, until June 22, 2007. Amyrh Harris played the role for one episode on December 26, 2007.

Ransom stepped into the role on May 20, 2008. In a 2018 interview, Ransom simply stated "I auditioned for the role of Theo Carver and I booked it." He had recently relocated to Los Angeles with his family to jumpstart his entertainment career. Ransom quickly signed with an agent and landed the role of Theo a few months later. In 2016, Ransom explained that he was only 4 years old and Days of Our Lives was "my first real audition." Ransom also competed against a few other actors for the role. He recalled, "I had to memorize some lines. We went to the audition and I wore pyjamas because the character was wearing them in the script." On his own, Ransom was called in to read for "the writer, producer and casting director. I don’t remember ever being scared or feeling nervous. I acted out my lines for them. It went great!" Ransom later described his time as Theo as "really exciting because it was my first television role. And I basically grew up on the show. […] I always had fun on the set working, especially when I got to work with other kids." In June 2015, it was announced that Ransom's Theo would be written out as the character was SORASed. The actor made his final appearance on July 9, 2015.

In March 2015, the soap released a casting call for the character. On August 12, 2015, it was announced that Pettis, an actor and model, was hired to recast the role. Pettis had recently made a guest appearance on Showtime's Ray Donovan and also appeared in the web series, Old Dogs & New Tricks. Pettis made his debut on November 3, 2015. Some time before he booked Theo, Pettis had auditioned for an under-five role on Days of Our Lives. While he did not book the role, Pettis was invited to audition for Theo thanks to his manager staying in contact with the casting director. He got a little bit of information about the character, specifically Theo's autism to prepare for his screen test opposite Reynolds. While Pettis competed against several other actors for Theo, he had also auditioned for The Bold and the Beautiful. The producers had narrowed it down to Pettis and another actor when he booked Theo.

On October 23, 2020, it was announced that Johnson had been hired to recast the role. A representative for the series said "Cameron is excited to be making his daytime drama debut on NBC’s Days of our Lives stepping into the role of Theo." According to a statement from Ron Carlivati in Soap Opera Digest, Pettis declined to come back to the series which led to a recast. Johnson made his debut on November 6, 2020. In preparation for the role, Johnson "binged the series" to make sure he was up-to-date on current plots and "I went on the fan pages for Theo and found his backstory, so I did all my homework." When he learned of Theo's autism, Johnson explained that he "did a deep dive on autism and tried to do what I could to incorporate that because I didn't want to lose that, obviously." On his first day, Johnson said "I was completely nervous, I was out of my mind."

On September 5, 2025, it was announced Tyler Joseph Andrews was recast in the role; he made his first appear as Theo on September 9. During the October 6, 2026, episode, Tajh Bellow portrayed the role, while Andrews was unavailable.

== Development ==
=== Characterization and portrayal ===
The 2015 casting call for Theo described as a "gorgeous African-American male" who is a "high-functioning" autistic teen. Pettis later said Theo has "relatable likeness to him" that would make viewers want to know him. Though Theo definitely has a mind of his own, "I don't think Theo is much of a manipulator" Pettis said of the character. "Theo's moral compass is pretty high" the actor stated. Pettis later described Theo as the "White knight" of Salem. While his actions may not always reflect it, Theo is "always coming from a loving place." He continued that "Theo is a fully rounded character I could see a lot of myself in." Pettis said he can sympathize with Theo's "social discomfort." Similar to Lexie, Theo has a very "caring nature."

By the time Pettis stepped into the role, Theo has been living with autism for more than half his life. While Pettis keeps Theo's condition in mind, he made an effort to see "Theo as a person first" instead of some "autistic kid." This allowed Pettis portray Theo with "more humanity." Pettis described stepping into the role as a bit intimidating. "It was a scary process when I started filming because you can totally play this character so over-the-top, and get backlash for it." He further explained, "I didn’t look at Theo that way. I approached his story line, and got an understanding of autism as a social awkwardness and the social not connecting. I get that way in my day-to-day life so I make sure to pay attention, and figure out if Theo would feel that way, and play more onto that." The actor also did his own research to prepare for the role -- "I talked to people who interacted with autistic people", specifically Higley. He stated "It was challenging to step into, but it's something I look forward to as an actor and it's fun." Longtime scriptwriter and former head-writer Ryan Quan took special care in crafting dialogue for Theo. In 2016 he said "Theo is the biggest challenge because there is a great responsibility to portray his autism as honestly as honestly and accurately as possible."

=== Autism ===
Dena Higley on the story's purpose

I would love to raise up a generation of people who embrace the differentness of these kids... These kids don't sit still in class the same way, but you know what? These kids are being mainstreamed. And if you don't have a kid who has autism, you will have a kid who has an autistic kid in his classroom. I just want the sense of 'we can't pretend they're not out there anymore... Embrace the autistic kids that you're going to find in your lives now because it's a growing population and we isolate them or we love them. It's a choice, and Days of Our Lives is choosing love.

— Elizabeth Lee, SoapCentral

In June 2008, Days of Our Lives announced a partnership with Autism Speaks for a storyline in which young Theo—aged 3 -- is diagnosed with Autism. The actor's mother, Katrina Ransom explained that she wasn't aware that her son would portray an autistic character until after Terrell was hired. The plot was actually the network's idea. Executives were pitching potential storylines ideas and when the subject of autism came up, head writer Dena Higley discussed her personal experiences with her son Connor, then aged 20, who like Theo, was also diagnosed at an age 3. The network bosses were immediately sold. "I never would have pushed the story uninvited" Higley admitted of how painful it would be for her family to discuss. NBC's senior vice president Bruce Evans praised the decision and said "We are hopeful that this storyline will serve as a resource for our viewers." Alison Singer, executive vice president of communications and awareness for Autism Speaks, said the story "realistically portrays the emotional trauma every family faces when a child is diagnosed with autism." Singer also praised the show for its commitment to raising awareness about the "autism crisis." The plan was to have the story play out long term, with viewers seeing Theo and his parents deal with his condition throughout his life. To help with craft the story, the producers brought in a researcher from UCLA to help out on set. Days would become only the second soap to address the issue of autism after ABC Daytime's All My Children which introduced the character of Lily Montgomery (Leven Rambin) in 1993. However, it was the first time a soap had featured a diagnosis and the effects of said diagnosis.

Higley said "We're telling the profound and life-altering story of a child with autism from his parents' point of view." The story focuses on Abe and Lexie's struggle to accept Theo's diagnoses "and ultimately, their ability to find life-affirming hope in the midst of learning how to live day to day with this disability." In an interview on NBC's Today, Higley revealed that she used dialogue from her real conversations with her husband Mark about their son. Renée Jones (Lexie), admitted she didn't know much about the condition or "the emotional toll that it takes on a family." James Reynolds (Abe), welcomed the story seeing it as chance to "showcase" what so many families go through. Jones said it also gives those viewers who have personal experience with autism the chance "to have what they're going through validated in some way."

The producers wanted to tell the story from the diagnosis, to the reaction, and how Theo could eventually live a normal life. In story, Abe and Lexie notice Theo's lack of verbal communication and small vocabulary. Reynolds later explained, "Theo had 30 or 40 words in his vocabulary, where a child at that age should have 500 words or so." The parents also notice Theo doesn't make eye contact with them and doesn't interact with other children. The very outgoing Ransom loved to smile and interact with his cast mates, something that the character would have to keep to a minimum. However, the young actor was able to take direction very well.

By the time Kyler Pettis took over the role, Theo has been living with autism for more than half his life. While Pettis keeps Theo's condition in mind, he made an effort to see "Theo as a person first" instead of some "autistic kid." This allowed Pettis portray Theo with "more humanity." Pettis described stepping into the role as a bit intimidating. "It was a scary process when I started filming because you can totally play this character so over-the-top, and get backlash for it." He further explained, "I didn’t look at Theo that way. I approached his story line, and got an understanding of autism as a social awkwardness and the social not connecting. I get that way in my day-to-day life so I make sure to pay attention, and figure out if Theo would feel that way, and play more onto that." The actor also did his own research to prepare for the role -- "I talked to people who interacted with autistic people", specifically Higley. He stated "It was challenging to step into, but it's something I look forward to as an actor and it's fun."

=== Relationship with Abe ===
After Lexie's death, Theo's relationship with Abe becomes the most important connection in his life. According to Kyler Pettis, "Theo has gotten comfortable with that he and his dad are buddies, and it's just the two of them." Of his co-star James Reynolds, Pettis said "He has the qualities that remind me of my own dad. So, it's easy to sink into that father/son relationship." On the father-son dynamic, Reynolds described Abe as being rather "strict" and protective of Theo not only because of Theo's autism, but also because Theo is coming of age. That dynamic becomes strained when Abe reconnects with his ex-girlfriend Valerie Grant (Vanessa A. Williams) and Theo becomes very protective. Theo feels like Valerie threatens his relationship with Abe. Pettis explained that "I think not only is it about a new person coming in and intruding on what Theo and Abe have, but Theo also sees it as intruding on what [Abe] and his mom had."

That protectiveness goes into overdrive when Abe is shot in the fall of 2016 and Theo feels a responsibility to take care of Abe on his own. Theo is thinking to himself, "What am I going to do if the doctor asks me a question." According to Pettis, it's a "scary" situation for Theo, especially without any real support. Theo even goes so far as to threaten Abe's shooter, Clyde Weston (James Read) with gun. Despite ample time to pull the trigger, "this is Theo Carver we are talking about here" Pettis declared as if such a thing couldn't be in Theo's nature. "I think the idea was stronger than the action in his mind." Pettis had a lot of fun with these scenes—initially too much fun for Theo. "I came running on set, and in my mind I was in a Bad Boys movie. I was yelling at [Clyde] all confident and everything." While it was good, a director reminded Pettis that Theo wouldn't be very tough in that situation, "so I had to turn that around" Pettis explained.

=== Romances ===
Outside of his family, Theo's (Ransom) relationship with Ciara Brady (Lauren Boles) is his most significant. The two have grown up together and are best friends. In addition, their parents have always been very close. In November 2015 the teen aged Ciara (Vivian Jovanni) seems to take a romantic interest Theo (Pettis). The two attend prom together and Theo even professes his love for her. But when Ciara tells Theo she wants nothing more than friendship, he finds comfort with Ciara's niece, Claire Brady (Keegan). Ciara soon pursues Theo again and a triangle develops. Kyler Pettis described Ciara as "Theo's one true love." And though he still loves her, at the moment, "it's more as a friend" and a romance isn't imminent. At his age, Theo would welcome that sort of attention from girls and "That's when Claire comes into the picture." According to Pettis, Theo is "intimidated by Claire." Things move a bit faster for the two of them but it's "what [Theo] has been looking for" at the time. However, Pettis suspected that Theo and Ciara would eventually end up together. Pettis described the triangle as one of the most challenging aspects of his portrayal of Theo because he'd never been in a situation like that. Pettis reveled in the Theo-Ciara breakup scenes. "I felt like me and Vivian [...], who is a good friend of mine, dropped into a very real place, and it's always great to get there as an actor."

== Storylines ==
=== 2003–2018 ===
In the summer of 2002, Abe announces his plans to divorce his wife Lexie for her attempt at kidnapping a child and trying to pass it off as their own. On the rebound, Lexie sleeps with Brandon Walker (Matt Cedeño). Lexie later reveals she is pregnant and a paternity test proves Abe is the baby's father. Abe and Lexie reunite and as she gives birth to her baby on May 29, 2003, Brandon is revealed to be Abe's long lost son. Brandon's new wife and Lexie's rival Sami Brady (Alison Sweeney) later reveals that she tampered with the baby's original paternity test to make sure Abe believes he is the child's father. Fortunately, a paternity test confirms Abe as the boy's father. On June 2, Lexie and Abe officially name their son Theodore Brandon, after Brandon and Abe's late brother. In September 2003, Abe is presumed dead when he is shot on the day of Theo's christening. Fortunately, Abe is revealed to be alive in 2004 and the family is reunited. After Lexie's latest affair, in 2006, Abe wants to divorce her and sue for custody of Theo. However, Lexie is presumed dead in January 2007 before the divorce is final leaving Abe to raise Theo on his own. Fortunately, Lexie is revealed to be alive several months later. In early 2008, Lexie is appointed to the chief of staff position at the hospital. In June 2008, a 3 year old Theo (Ransom) is diagnosed with autism which puts a strain on the Carvers' marriage. Lexie later walks away from her position at the hospital to spend more time with Theo. In the fall of 2008, Abe decides to run for mayor and the parents struggle with the idea of forcing Theo to live a life in the public eye. In December 2008, Theo runs away from Lexie and gets lost. Fortunately Abe and Lexie's friend Bo Brady (Peter Reckell) tracks the boy down and brings him home. In 2009, Theo starts making progress with his condition when he acknowledges Abe and Lexie as his parents for the first time. Over the years, Theo forms bonds with his grandfather Stefano DiMera (Joseph Mascolo) and his uncles EJ (James Scott), Chad DiMera (Casey Deidrick) and Cameron Davis (Nathan Owens) as well as his cousins. He is also very close friends with Bo and Hope Williams Brady's (Kristian Alfonso) mischievous daughter Ciara (Lauren Boles). In 2012, Lexie passes away leaving Abe to raise their son alone. Theo later reveals that he has been communicating with his late mother.

In November 2015, a 16-year old Theo (Pettis) attends Hope's wedding with his father and spends most of his time with Ciara (Vivian Jovanni). During the reception, Theo is with Joey Johnson (James Lastovic) when Joey passes out. Theo initially panics, but eventually calls Lani Price (Sal Stowers) for help, and Joey is rushed to the hospital. Later, during the fireworks for the Salem bicentennial, Ciara kisses Theo. Theo bonds with Lani over baseball and is quite shocked when Abe reveals that Lani is his half-sister. He confides in Joey because he doesn't know how to react and Ciara assures him that having a sister can be a good thing and Joey later accuses Theo of having a crush on Ciara. Theo comforts Ciara when her father Bo passes away from a brain tumor.

Theo later starts receiving insulting text messages from an anonymous bully and he tries to hide it from Ciara. Lani later finds out and he swears her to secrecy. Theo then confides in Abe and Lani about his crush on Ciara. When the bullying continues, Lani lets it slip to Abe and demands answers from Theo. Theo pleads with Abe to leave it alone but questions why people are so cruel. Theo is shocked when Ciara reveals that her stepbrother Chase Jennings (Jonathon McClendon) is the one bullying him and he furiously confronts him. While Ciara likes Theo, she is torn by her loyalty to Chase. In March 2016, Theo is shocked when Ciara confesses that Chase raped her and she swears him to secrecy. Theo, Joey and Claire later abduct Chase and force him to confess so he can be arrested. Ciara and Theo later attend his Uncle Chad's (Billy Flynn) wedding to her cousin Abigail Deveraux (Kate Mansi) where Theo serves as best man. A drunken Ciara later kisses Theo after her 18th birthday party. Meanwhile, Abe is uneasy about Theo and Ciara's growing intimacy fearing he will get hurt. While they are preparing for prom, Mark McNair (Connor Weil) forcibly kisses Ciara which leads to Theo attacking him. During the prom, Mark puts on a slide show to humiliate Theo and Ciara. Theo later defends Ciara and his friends after they spray paint Mark's car for revenge and get arrested. Abe orders Theo to stay away from Ciara but he refuses. Ciara agrees with Abe and tells Theo to avoid her. However, the teens struggle to stay away from each other. As Ciara continues pushing Theo away, Claire takes an interest in him. Theo celebrates with Claire when her parents agree to support her music career and they share a kiss. But Ciara, having been rejected by a grieving Chad following Abigail's death, finds them together. Claire pushes Theo to move on and stop worrying about Ciara. However, Theo and Ciara's closeness makes Claire insecure. Theo stays at the DiMera mansion when a prison break him in danger. Theo and Ciara then console one another when Claire and Joey are abducted by the escapees, and she ask if he has feelings for Claire. When Abe is shot during a press conference, a distraught Theo pulls a gun on the shooter, Clyde Weston (James Read). However, Theo freezes up allowing Clyde to escape. Theo and Ciara console one another when Claire and Joey are kidnapped by the escaped prisoners and she inquires about his feelings for Claire. After his father is shot during a press conference, a distraught Theo pulls a gun on Abe's shooter, Clyde Weston (James Read) allowing Clyde to avoid getting arrested when Theo freezes up. Theo is unnerved by the sudden return of Abe's ex-girlfriend Doctor Valerie Grant and blames her when Abe's condition worsens after she operates. While Abe recovers, Theo distrust Valerie's suspicious behavior as she rekindles her romance with Abe. He enlist Claire's help to spy on Valerie. In the meantime, Theo and Claire make their relationship official. Snooping through Valerie's hotel room, Theo realizes she is hiding a secret. With Claire's help, Theo plants a recording device in Valerie's room on Christmas.

In 2017, Theo warms up to Val when she agrees not to tell Abe about his spying and after she councils Theo and Claire as they experience bullying due to their interracial romance. Theo later moves into an apartment with Claire and their friends. Theo and Claire's first attempt at making love is interrupted by Ciara and Theo later confides in Chad that he is nervous about losing his virginity. However, they ultimately make love for the first time in April 2017 and Theo plays matchmaker for Ciara and his Wyatt Stone (Scott Shilstone). Theo accuses Wyatt of using Ciara as Wyatt begins borrowing money from her and even convinces her to do his term paper. Theo admits that he put Wyatt up to asking Ciara out and she dumps him before leaving town. Theo and Claire are mortified when Abe and Hope confront them about a sex tape on his computer. While they deny knowledge of the recording, Theo accuses Claire of using the tape to boost her aspiring music career. However, Joey's girlfriend Jade Michaels (Gabrielle Haugh) reveals that she recorded the couple. When Theo apologizes for not trusting her, but Claire admits she hid the love letter Ciara wrote him before she left and he dumps her. In the summer, Theo goes to work for DiMera Enterprises in the IT department, at Chad's invite. When Chad is suspected of Deimos Kiriakis (Vincent Irizarry), Abigail and Theo's uncle André (Thaao Penghlis) enlist Theo's help hacking into Dario Hernandez's (Jordi Vilasuso) phone to delete an incriminating picture of Chad. Abe furiously chastises Theo for breaking the law fearing the DiMeras' crimes will put him in harm's way. When Val's son Eli Grant (Lamon Archey) suddenly arrest Abe for pedaling counterfeiting, Theo fears he'll lose his only parent. While Abe maintains his innocence, Theo worries what everyone else will think and offers him comfort. Meanwhile, Theo worries how he and Claire will can the rent without Ciara, now that Joey in prison and Claire suggest Joey's brother Tripp Dalton (Lucas Adams) share the apartment with them. Theo is initially against it as he is jealous of Claire's budding friendship with Tripp. After Tripp expresses interest in dating Claire, Theo admits that he wants her back and they resume dating. Claire later admits that Tripp pretended to like her to make Theo jealous and Theo surprisingly thanks Tripp as it forced him to face his true feelings for Claire. Despite both Claire and Tripp's insistence that they were only friends, Theo is uncomfortable to learn they are both working at the Horton Town Square. In November 2017, André's wife Kate DiMera (Lauren Koslow) enlist Theo's help in identifying a hacker at DiMera Enterprises. When Theo insists the security he set up is nearly impenetrable, Kate assumes concludes that André is the culprit. Theo doesn't want to get involved because he doesn't like keeping secrets but Kate convinces him that it's to protect the family. Though he makes progress quickly, Theo struggles with lying, specifically to Chad. When Theo tracks down the hacker to an office building, Theo offers to break-in but Kate warns against it. However, Kate changes her mind having run out of options. After Lani's birthday party, Theo sets out to break into the building but sets off the burglar alarm alerting the police. Wearing a hood, Theo is shot by Lani's cop boyfriend JJ Deveraux while trying to get away. While Theo survives emergency surgery, he falls into a coma shortly after. After nearly a month, Theo wakes up on Christmas Day only to learn he is paralyzed. While Abe and Chad struggle to forgive Kate, Theo does. While neither Theo nor Kate are charged with a crime, Abe forces Kate to fire Theo from the company. Meanwhile, a recently returned Ciara (Victoria Konefal) professes her love for him but Theo rejects her.

In January 2018, Theo reluctantly relocates to South Africa to participate in a clinical trial for rehabilitation. In the spring of 2018, Claire tries to get Theo to hack into Bella magazine's website to help Claire win the modeling contest but Theo refuses to help her cheat. After visiting with Theo, Claire returns to reveal that they have broken up after Theo learned that she rigged the contest anyway. In January 2019, Ciara visits Theo after her breakup with Ben Weston (Robert Scott Wilson).

=== 2020–present ===
Theo returns in 2020 along with JJ, to surprise Abe. Theo and JJ reveal that they are roommates and are now the best of friends. When Theo visits with Claire (Isabel Durant), and they reminisce over Ciara, they share a kiss. Claire wants to resume their relationship but Theo reveals he is seeing someone and Theo encourages Claire to pursue a potential romance with a new love interest. Theo shares a happy reunion with Lani and Eli who are expecting twins. Abe and Lani try to convince Theo to move closer to home and realize his reluctance is due to his new relationship. Theo says his goodbyes but promises to come back to visit.

In 2021, Theo returns to meet his new niece and nephew, Jules and Carver, and to attend their christening. Lani and Eli have also chosen Theo as Jules's godfather. Meanwhile, Theo confides in Lani and Claire that he has split with his girlfriend and Claire assumes it is because Theo is still carrying a torch for Ciara.

== Reception ==
=== Ransom ===
Terrell Ransom, Jr. became quite popular in the role of Theo. Lori Wilson of Soaps.com said the young actor "wasted no time capturing the hearts of Days of Our Lives viewers." Wilson herself said Ransom a "major reason" the autism story was so "compelling." In 2009, Ransom was nominated for the Young Artist Award for "Best Performance in a TV series - Recurring Young Actor." In 2015, Ransom was pre-nominated for the Daytime Emmy Award for Outstanding Younger Actor in a Drama Series.

=== Pettis ===
Michael Fairman on Pettis's Theo

Playing a young man living with autism, and who is growing up through teen angst and beyond right before the audiences’ eyes, has made Kyler Pettis’ Theo a character to root for on the NBC daytime drama series.

— Michael Fairman, On-Air On-Soaps

Omar White-Nobles of TVSource Magazine praised the decision to age Theo into his teen years just in time for the show's 50th anniversary. "I may be 29, but I'm a fan of the multi-generational aspect of the continuing narrative." Kyler Pettis' casting made quite the impression on both viewers and critics. The initial announcement led to some viewers being worried that Theo's autism would be cut out with the casting of the "pretty boy" actor but most were relieved when the writers decided to continue Theo's autism storyline. TVSource Magazine's Coryon Gray praised the actor for his "spot on" and "believable" portrayal of the autistic teenager upon his debut. Gray also hailed Pettis as one of the strongest new actors in the teen scene. Gray later said "there's no denying that Kyler Pettis' Theo has grown to become a great character with some of the most natural writing on the show." Gray raved about Pettis' portrayal of Theo when the character gets stranded in a blackout. "Props have to be given when they're deserved and I believe Kyler Pettis deserved them." He continued, "All of Theo's little ticks were brought to life after only ever being talked about on screen, never really shown." Diane Brounstein of SoapHub also praised the writing for the character and described Theo as "The real star" of the week. Laurisa praised Pettis for his "nice performance." Cindy McLennan said "Kyler Pettis has done a deft job with Theo Carver, a character on the Autism spectrum." Michael Goldberg of Serial Scoop praised Pettis for his portrayal as Theo confronts a bully and declared that Pettis "transcends his role." Goldberg said that Pettis portrayed Theo's autism with "ease." Tony S. from Soap Central also praised the plot as it "actually played out much better than expected." He continued, "The depths of Theo's hurt and heartbreak over being bullied was superbly played out by Kyler Pettis." Cindy McLennan from SoapShows described Pettis as a "godsend." McLennan gave Pettis a grade of "A+" for his portrayal and said the actor "managed to make our sweet Theo both relatable and unique." While Pettis definitely looked the part, McLennan said "Pettis has delivered with aplomb." She continued that the actor had "deftly played a character who is not neurotypical without making his character a parody." Christine Orlando from TV Fanatic was a bit more harsh in her judgement of the teenagers. "I think Theo is the only watchable character but when he’s constantly paired with Ciara or Claire, I lose interest fast." In honor of the show's 51st anniversary in 2016, Soap Central included in its list of "51 Reasons to watch." The article stated "Theo is adorable, kind, heroic, brave... (and played to perfection by Kyler Pettis). Alina Adams criticized the inconsistent writing for Theo's autism which she said "seems to come and go as the story demands, so he doesn't feel like a very strong presence." Pettis quickly became a fan favorite. In March 2016, Kyler Pettis debuted on TVSource Magazine's fan poll at No. 7 on the top actors list. In 2019, Pettis won his first Daytime Emmy in the category of Outstanding Younger Actor for his portrayal of Theo.

=== Romance ===
Bethany from Soap Central raved about Pettis' dynamic opposite Vivian Jovanni (Ciara). "I like that Theo wants to protect [Ciara], yet he doesn't come off as being overbearing or as someone who 'knows what's best' for Ciara." Tony S. praised the actor's portrayal of Theo's reaction to Ciara dumping him. "Kyler Pettis' hurt expressions made me want to send Theo a flock of puppies to brighten his day." Of Theo's pairing with Claire, Coryon Gray said "I love them, seriously!" However, Gray felt the writing for Theo in the romance left a lot to be desired. "How has this turmoil not affected Theo with his condition? Dating Claire alone is sensory overload but he’s been written more dead to the world than anything. Theo should be noticing a lot more than he does because of his autism." Laurisa compared the triangle between Claire, Theo and Ciara to Sami/Austin and Carrie. "That is not a compliment" she stated.
