= Ciara Brady =

- Days of Our Lives character
- Victoria Konefal as Ciara Brady
- Portrayed by: Dakoda and Danica Hobbs (2007–2008); Lauren Boles (2008–2015); Vivian Jovanni (2015–2017); Victoria Konefal (2017–present)
- Duration: 2007–present
- First appearance: February 15, 2007
- Created by: Hogan Sheffer and Meg Kelly
- Introduced by: Ken Corday and Stephen Wyman (2007); Ken Corday, Greg Meng, and Albert Alarr (2015, 2017); Ken Corday and Janet Spellman-Drucker (2024)
- Spin-off appearances: Days of Our Lives: Beyond Salem (2021–2022)
- Vivian Jovanni as Ciara Brady
In-universe information
- Other names: Ciara Alice Brady; Ciara Weston
- Occupation: Student; Hospital Volunteer; Nanny; Junior Executive at Titan
- Father: Bo Brady
- Mother: Hope Williams Brady
- Brothers: Shawn-Douglas Brady; Zack Brady
- Half-sisters: Chelsea Brady
- Spouse: Ben Weston (2020–2021, 2021–present)
- Children: Bo Weston; Addie Weston
- Grandfathers: Victor Kiriakis; Doug Williams; Shawn Brady (legal)
- Grandmothers: Caroline Brady; Addie Horton
- Uncles: Xander Kiriakis; Philip Kiriakis; Roman Brady; Frankie Brady (adoptive); Max Brady (adoptive); Steve Olson; Douglas LeClaire
- Aunts: Isabella Toscano; Kimberly Brady; Kayla Brady; Julie Williams
- Nephews: Issac Brady
- Nieces: Claire Brady
- First cousins: Brady Black; Victoria Kiriakis; Tyler Kiriakis; Carrie Brady; Sami Brady; Eric Brady; Cassie Brady; Rex Brady; Andrew Donovan IV; Theresa Donovan; Stephanie Johnson; Joey Johnson; Spencer Olson; David Banning

Ciara Brady is a fictional character from Days of Our Lives, an American soap opera on the NBC network. Created by Hogan Sheffer and Meg Kelly, the role is portrayed by Victoria Konefal since 2017.

She is a member of three of the most prominent Salem families, Brady, Kiriakis, and Horton, and the only daughter of the supercouple Bo Brady and Hope Williams.

== Casting ==
Child actors Dakota and Danica Hobbs originated the role from 2007 to 2008. The role was then taken over by Lauren Boles from 2008 to 2015. In 2015, Days of Our Lives sent out a casting call using the code name Danielle, describing the character as a 16–17-year-old girl who has experienced a lot of pain in her life. In October 2015, it was declared that Vivian Jovanni had won the role. Jovanni debuted on October 30, 2015. In December 2016, Jovanni left the show. In July 2017, it was revealed that Ciara would be recast and return in December 2017 alongside Brandon Beemer's Shawn-Douglas Brady and Martha Madison's Belle Black. In August 2017, actress Victoria Konefal was cast as the new Ciara, making her debut on December 1, 2017. In July 2020, Konefal announced her departure as a full-time cast member, but left open the possibility of returning for guest appearances.

== Storylines ==
=== 2007–2014 ===
Ciara Brady is born to Hope Brady (Kristian Alfonso), who believes that Patrick Lockhart is the father thanks to some fake DNA results by Belle Black that show he is. Bo Brady (Peter Reckell) and Hope rekindle their romance, pushing Patrick into kidnapping Hope. Ciara is born in a warehouse, where she is delivered by Bo. Patrick reveals the truth about the baby's paternity before being arrested.

Ciara lives with her parents for the first couple of years of her life, before living with Hope, Doug (Bill Hayes), and Julie (Susan Seaforth Hayes) after her mother and father briefly break up. After her father's disappearance, Ciara bullies Chase Jennings, but when her mother and Chase's father, Aiden (Daniel Cosgrove), start dating, they become best friends.

=== 2015–present ===
In October 2015, a SORASed Ciara arrives home in Salem with her step-brother Chase for the wedding of her mom Hope and Aiden. At the Bicentennial party during the fireworks, she kissed Theo Carver (Kyler Pettis). After the wedding, she admitted to her step-grandmother/Aunt Julie about being happy for her mother, but missing her dad Bo so much and how his jacket reminded her of him. After learning of her mom being admitted to the hospital, she rushes there, shocked to see Bo at the hospital, they have a family reunion, where her dad fills her in on his abduction, Aiden's mental breakdown, and attempt of killing Hope and how he saved her. Ciara was happy having her dad back home. Sadly, a few days later, she got the worst news ever though her brother Shawn-Douglas Brady (Jason Cook) about their dad dying from an inoperable brain tumor, which came as a shock to her. Thankfully, her family and friends were there for her, including her love interest Theo, as she coped with the death of her father. While Theo was there to give Ciara comfort, her friend became jealous and started bullying him online with rude text messages, when Ciara learns the truth after finding the messages on Chase's phone, she confronts him over her his bullying. Later, she reveals to Theo about her step-brother being the bully.

In February 2016, Ciara was raped by Chase, whom she always treated like a brother. She dealt with the pain, keeping the truth to herself for weeks, before finally letting Theo know. Ciara's friends Theo and Joey (James Lastovic) along with her niece Claire Brady (Olivia Rose Keegan) abduct Chase to punish him for his wrongdoings, taking him to the warehouse and tie him up to a chair, giving Ciara the benefit of punishing her rapist. However, Ciara did lash out at him, but did the opposite by not thrashing him. She called her mom to the warehouse and opened up to her being raped. Disgusted with her stepson's act, Hope arrested him on charges of rape.

Ciara had an on-and-off relationship with Theo for a year, before breaking up with him. She felt jealous when he moves on with Claire. She briefly dates Wyatt Stone (Scott Shilstone) but breaks up with him after finding out that Theo paid him to date her. Upset with Theo's behavior, she leaves town.

In January 2018, she returned to Salem when Theo was shot. After he moved to South Africa for treatment, she and Tripp Dalton (Lucas Adams) dated briefly. She got into an accident while riding a motorbike and passed out. Newly reformed Ben Weston (Robert Scott Wilson) found her injured and unconscious on the road, he scooped her into his arms and took her to the cabin where he takes care of her, Ciara questions his sanity after she wakes up. He promises to have reformed and lets him fix her wounds which makes her trust him. Ben begins to snap afterwards when he runs out of his medication as he can't go out to get them due to the Salem police putting out an APB on him and Ciara.

It is then that the paranoid Ben begins to suffers from hallucinations of his father Clyde who tries to make him believe that Ciara will put him behind bars. Ciara talks him down and makes her feel that he can trust her. Ben believes her and leaves to collect his medication from the pharmacy. When someone sets the cabin on fire, Hope and Rafe Hernandez (Galen Gering) save Ciara from the fire and arrest Ben, who swears he is innocent. Ciara hires Ted Laurent (Gilles Marini) as his attorney. Ciara invites Ben to move in the apartment with her, Tripp, and Claire. She feels attracted to Ben and only sleeps with Tripp when evidence shows Ben was the one who set the fire and is arrested by Hope.

Ciara breaks up with Tripp after learning he planted evidence against Ben and starts seeing Ben. Ben works for Stefan DiMera (Tyler Christopher as the security head, and does the dirty work of abducting Gabi Hernandez (Camila Banus) from the DiMera mansion per Steven's order. When Ciara finds out, she breaks up with Ben and leaves Salem to visit Theo. After her return, she is abducted by Jordan Ridgeway (Chrishell Stause) from the airport and kept hostage in the cabin, where she is tied up in bed. Ben rescues her from the burning cabin where she was left to die by Jordan. Hope shows up with Ted and threatens to shoot Ben, when Ciara comes in-between and fills her in on Jordan being guilty. Hope apologizes and thanks him for saving Ciara's life. Ciara feels sick, so Ben carries her to the hospital.

Hope asks Ben to stay with Ciara before she leaves. Ciara rekindles her romance with Ben, Jordan shows up in Ciara's room and attacks Ben, knocking him out. Ciara stops her, as Jordan was trying to inject him. Jordan turns on her, about to kill her, but Ben saves her. Jordan is arrested and Ben and Ciara reunite. It is revealed that Claire is the one who set the first fire that almost killed her. When she finds out, she and Tripp compose a plan to get Claire to confess, but it goes horribly wrong and Claire kidnaps Ciara and tries to kill her again. Luckily, Ben, Hope, and Marlena (Deidre Hall) get there in time and stop her from setting another fire. Before Claire gets taken to Bayview Sanitarium, Ciara tells her that she forgives her and loves her, but they will never be like they used to. Victor Kiriakis (John Aniston) and Brady Black (Eric Martsolf) offer Ciara a job at Titan Industries and she accepts. Ciara is uneven about Jordan coming back to town, but Ben is determined to protect her.

== Reception ==
In 2020, Charlie Mason from Soaps She Knows placed Ciara at #32 on their list of the 35 most memorable characters from Days of Our Lives, calling Ciara "The perfect mixture of her parents" and commenting that "this feisty force of nature turned into a fan favorite by Victoria Konefal is all but guaranteed to continue rising in this countdown as sand slips through the hourglass."
