= List of Days of Our Lives characters introduced in the 2010s =

A list of notable characters from the NBC soap opera Days of Our Lives that significantly impacted storylines and debuted between January 1, 2010, to December 31, 2019.

== Madeline Peterson Woods ==
Madeline Peterson Woods
- Days of Our Lives character
- Portrayed by: Jessica Tuck
- Duration: 2010
- First appearance: April 7, 2010
- Last appearance: July 19, 2010
- Created by: Dena Higley & Christopher Whitesell
- Introduced by: Ken Corday & Gary Tomlin
In-universe information
- Occupation: Judge; Attorney; Former Prostitute/call girl
- Spouse: Charles Woods
- Children: Chad DiMera
- Grandchildren: Grace McCormick-Woods; Thomas DiMera; Charlotte DiMera

Madeline Peterson Woods, portrayed by Jessica Tuck, is the mother of Chad DiMera. Madeline died after falling down a flight of stairs during an argument with Chad.

== Jane Smith ==
Jane Smith is the warden of the Salem County Correctional Facility, the prison where Hope Brady serves time in 2010. She works with an inmate, Lee Michaels, to kill inmates during routine medical procedures in order to harvest their organs in an operation run by Stefano DiMera. Jane first appeared on September 21, 2010. Stacy Haiduk had been hired to portray the role but was not able to fulfill the commitment so the role was recast with Gina Gallego.

== Ben Walters ==
Ben Walters
- Days of Our Lives character
- Portrayed by: Ty Treadway
- Duration: 2010–11
- First appearance: September 17, 2010
- Last appearance: February 2, 2011
- Created by: Dena Higley; Christopher Whitesell
- Introduced by: Ken Corday; Gary Tomlin

Ben Walters was portrayed by Ty Treadway from September 17, 2010, to February 2, 2011.

Ben is a specialist brought in by Stefano DiMera on to handle EJ DiMera's injury after he was shot in the head by Sami Brady. While at the hospital he briefly dated Jennifer Horton.

Ben was later revealed to be part of a human organ trafficking scheme organized by Stefano. His accomplice was Jane Smith, the warden at the women's prison where Hope Brady was being incarcerated. After Jennifer's heart is harvested, Daniel Jonas exposes the scheme and saves Jennifer. Ben is arrested for his part in the crime and Jane fingers him as the mastermind out of fear of being killed by Stefano.

== Lee Michaels ==
Lee Michaels is a trustee in the prison where Hope Brady serves time in 2010. She is a doctor who was imprisoned for illegally prescribing pain killers to her patients. She is assigned to the prison's infirmary, where she works with Warden Jane Smith to kill inmates during routine medical procedures in order to harvest their organs. Lee is played by Robin Mattson and first appeared on October 5, 2010, to 2011.

== Parker Jonas ==
Parker Jonas
- Days of Our Lives character
- Portrayed by: Ellie and Rose Karchmer (2010–11); Bailey and Rowan McAlevey (2010; temp.); Rheya and Thea Readmond (2010; temp.); Anton and Preston LeBlanc (2011); Evan and Luke Kruntchev (2013–15); Christian Ganiere (2016–)
- Duration: 2010–11; 2013–
- First appearance: November 11, 2010
- Created by: Dena Higley and Christopher Whitesell
- Introduced by: Ken Corday and Gary Tomlin
In-universe information
- Other names: Parker Daniel Jonas; Parker Kiriakis
- Father: Daniel Jonas
- Mother: Chloe Lane
- Half-sisters: Melanie Jonas; Holly Jonas
- Grandfathers: George Jonas (legal); Craig Wesley
- Grandmothers: Maggie Horton; Lillian Parker Jonas (adoptive); Nancy Wesley
- Aunts: Sarah Horton; Melissa Horton (adoptive); Joy Wesley; Summer Townsend
- First cousins: Nathan Horton (adoptive); Mackenzie Horton; Kelsey

Parker Daniel Jonas is the son of Daniel Jonas and Chloe Lane, although Philip Kiriakis was long thought to be his father. He was born on November 11, 2010, in the Horton cabin after his mother Chloe Lane goes into premature labor. There are complications with the birth (the umbilical cord is wrapped around his neck), and Chloe is assisted by Parker's assumed older sister Melanie. Philip and Daniel later show up just as Parker is born. Chloe and Daniel go to the hospital and name him Parker Jonas, after Daniel's mother. While Daniel was initially assumed to be the baby's father, it was later revealed (incorrectly) that Parker was conceived during a one-night stand between Chloe and Philip. When Chloe takes a paternity test, the results are changed by Caroline Brady to make her believe that Daniel is the father. When the assumed truth about Parker's paternity is revealed, Daniel leaves Chloe. On March 2, 2011, Philip becomes Parker's legal father and Parker's last name is changed to Kiriakis. On January 7, 2013, Chloe returns to Salem and informs Daniel that he is in fact Parker's biological father.

== Dario Hernandez ==
Dario Hernandez
- Days of Our Lives character
- Portrayed by: Francisco San Martín (2011); Jordi Vilasuso (2016–17)
- Duration: 2011; 2016–17
- First appearance: March 9, 2011
- Last appearance: September 26, 2017
- Created by: Dena Higley and Christopher Whitesell
- Introduced by: Ken Corday and Gary Tomlin (2011); Ken Corday, Albert Alarr and Greg Meng (2016)
In-universe information
- Occupation: Businessman; Con-artist; Bartender (2015–); Dock worker
- Parents: Eduardo Hernandez; Adriana Hernandez
- Brothers: Rafe Hernandez
- Sisters: Arianna Hernandez; Gabi Hernandez
- Half-sisters: Paige Larson
- Spouse: Abigail Deveraux (2017)
- Stepsons: Thomas DiMera (2017)
- Nieces and nephews: Arianna Horton

Dario Hernandez is a fictional character on the NBC daytime soap opera, Days of Our Lives. The role was played by Francisco San Martín, who originated the role, from March to September 2011, and by Jordi Vilasuso from February 2016 to September 2017.

In December 2010, it was reported that Francisco San Martin would play the role of Dario, Rafe and Gabi Hernandez's (Galen Gering and Camila Banus) brother as a way to fill the void left following their sister Arianna's (Lindsay Hartley) death. San Martin previously played Javier Rodriguez, a patient of Nathan Horton (Mark Hapka) for one episode on November 16, 2010. San Martin's first air date was March 9, 2011. Three months later in June 2011, following the departure of head writer Dena Higley and the appointments of new writers Marlene Clark Poulter and Darrell Ray Thomas Jr., it was reported that San Martin was among the list of actors let go from the show. San Martin's last air date was on September 19, 2011.

In August 2015, nearly four years after San Martin's exit, it was reported that former Guiding Light and All My Children actor Jordi Vilasuso would take over the role of Dario. Vilasuso made his debut on February 19, 2016. In July 2017, it was reported that Vilasuso would be departing the show with his last air date on July 31, 2017. Vilasuso made a further appearance on September 26, 2017.

== Quinn Hudson ==
Quinn Hudson
- Days of Our Lives character
- Portrayed by: Bren Foster
- Duration: 2011–12
- First appearance: May 5, 2011
- Last appearance: February 22, 2012
- Created by: Dena Higley; Christopher Whitesell
- Introduced by: Ken Corday; Gary Tomlin
In-universe information
- Mother: Vivian Alamain
- Half-brothers: Stefan DiMera; Jake Lambert
- Uncles: Leopold Alamain
- First cousins: John Black (adoptive); Lawrence Alamain
- Other relatives: Nicholas Alamain; Brady Black (adoptive); Belle Black (adoptive); Paul Narita (adoptive); Claire Brady (adoptive); Tate Black (adoptive)

Quinn Hudson, played by Australian actor Bren Foster, is the son of Vivian Alamain. He surfaces in Salem in 2011, and is part of a plot by Kate Roberts to bring down Chloe Lane. Quinn blackmails Chloe into being a call girl like Kate used to be. Quinn changes for Taylor Walker and tells Chloe to stop. Quinn leaves Salem with his mother, Ivan and Taylor. He returns for a short while before departing again.

== Anne Milbauer ==
Anne Milbauer
- Days of Our Lives character
- Portrayed by: Meredith Scott Lynn
- Duration: 2012–2017
- First appearance: September 7, 2012
- Last appearance: July 11, 2017
- Created by: Gary Tomlin; Christopher Whitesell
- Introduced by: Ken Corday; Lisa de Cazotte; Greg Meng

Anne Milbauer has been portrayed by Meredith Scott Lynn since September 7, 2012. She last appeared July 11, 2017.

Anne was the head of HR at University Hospital. She became enraged when Jennifer Horton was hired as Director of Communications over her. When Chloe returned to Salem in 2013, she teamed up with her to break up Jennifer and Daniel Jonas.

== Arianna Horton ==
Arianna Horton
- Days of Our Lives character
- Portrayed by: Harper and Sydnee Udell (2013–2019); Kingston Foster (2019); Sydney Brower (2019–2020); Lane Rosa (2022); Marissa Reyes (2025–2026); Vico Escorcia (since 2026)
- Duration: 2013–2020; 2022; 2025–present
- First appearance: May 22, 2013
- Created by: Gary Tomlin and Christopher Whitesell
- Introduced by: Ken Corday, Lisa de Cazotte and Greg Meng; Ken Corday and Janet Spellman-Drucker (2025)
In-universe information
- Father: Will Horton
- Mother: Gabi Hernandez
- Stepfather: Sonny Kiriakis
- Grandfathers: Lucas Horton; Eduardo Hernandez
- Grandmothers: Sami Brady; Adrianna Hernandez
- Uncles: Rafe Hernandez; Dario Hernandez; Johnny DiMera
- Aunts: Arianna Hernandez; Allie Horton; Sydney DiMera; Paige Larson
- First cousins: Henry Horton; Trey DiMera (adoptive); Olivia DiMera
- Other relatives: Marlena Evans; Roman Brady; Kate Roberts

Arianna Grace Horton is the daughter of Gabi Hernandez and Will Horton. She is introduced on May 21, 2013. She is named after her late aunts, Arianna Hernandez and Grace DiMera. From 2019 to 2020, the role was played by Sydney Brower. In 2022, Lane Rosa briefly portrayed the role. In April 2025, it was announced the character had been rapidly aged and recast with Marissa Reyes; she debuted when Arianna returned to Salem on May 20. She departed the role on March 26, 2026; with Vico Escorcia assuming the role on April 8.

Arianna is conceived when her parents have a one-night stand in August 2012. When Gabi finds out that she is pregnant she decides on an abortion, but cannot go through with it. Gabi is in a relationship with Will's cousin, Nick Fallon, and Nick wants to be Arianna's legal father. Will reveals that he is actually Arianna's father at Nick and Gabi's first attempt at a wedding in January 2013. Will signs away his rights after Nick blackmails him (about him shooting EJ DiMera) in March 2013. Leading up to her birth, Gabi and Nick are held hostage by Jensen, a former prison inmate Nick knows. Sonny and Will arrive and Sonny is able to escape with Gabi, but Will stays to help Nick. Gabi reveals that she has been having small contractions all day and Sonny finds an abandoned shed in which to deliver the baby. Sonny delivers Arianna, and Gabi and Arianna are brought to the hospital and given a clean bill of health. After she is born, Gabi and Nick send back her birth certificate before Gabi signs it in order to have Will's name listed as the father.

Arianna and her mother move in with Will and Sonny, and they raise Arianna as a three-parent family. In 2014, Sonny marries Arianna's father, Will, becoming her step-father. When Gabi is imprisoned for the murder of Nick, Arianna is raised by her two dads. Arianna is reunited with her mother when she is released from prison in September 2015. Her happiness is cut short when Will is apparently murdered, and Sonny, stricken with grief, leaves town, and Gabi is left to raise Arianna on her own. Sonny returns in 2016, and recommences co-parenting her with Gabi. In late 2017, it is revealed that Will is, in fact, alive. He is suffering from amnesia after being strangled and abducted, and has no memory of his life before. As soon as he returns to Salem, Arianna and Gabi come to see him. Despite not remembering them, Will treats Arianna as his daughter, and begins to take part in co-parenting Arianna again. When Will's amnesia leads to Arianna's two dads divorcing, Sonny continues to co-parent her, as does Will.

In 2018, her mother Gabi is wrongfully imprisoned, and Will and Sonny tell Arianna that her mom is working away from home. After Gabi is proved innocent, Will and Sonny tell Ari that her mom is coming home, but Gabi's release is delayed for several more weeks due to a murder at the prison, and when Gabi finally gets out, Arianna, feeling unloved by her mother, is angry and unwelcoming towards her.

== Cole Hines ==
Cole Hines
- Days of Our Lives character
- Portrayed by: Riley Bodenstab
- Duration: 2013–15
- First appearance: June 27, 2013
- Last appearance: May 21, 2015
- Created by: Gary Tomlin and Christopher Whitesell
- Introduced by: Ken Corday, Lisa de Cazotte and Greg Meng
In-universe information
- Occupation: Student

Cole Hines was created by head writers Gary Tomlin and Christopher Whitesell.

The character first appeared on June 27, 2013, as Bev Walters' boyfriend. He is in a group of drug dealers and users. He and JJ Deveraux get into a fist fight after he starts damaging his late grandfather's tree. The police apprehend them only to discover that they have shoplifted goods. The woman they stole from appears and wishes to press charges. Cole and his friend JJ get arrested. They are released after the woman decides not to press charges. Bev breaks up with Cole and starts dating JJ, which upsets Cole. He decides to get revenge on JJ for stealing his girlfriend; he calls the police when he catches JJ selling drugs to students and gets him arrested. In January 2014, Cole gets arrested and sent to jail. He receives the maximum sentence for his part in the robbery. In June 2014, he gets out of jail and meets up with Bev at the park. He needs some money, which Bev agrees to give him in return for dropping a few joints in Paige Larson's purse at Club TBD. As he is about to do so, Paige catches him. JJ arrives and gets in a fight with Cole until Paige steps in and Cole gets away. Paige sees Cole and Bev at the park and later confronts Bev. Cole meets JJ and confesses that Bev made him do it. Cole then checks himself into a rehabilitation center. After several months he gets out and starts attending Salem University. He meets Paige there and apologizes for his wrongdoings. She forgives him and they briefly start dating afterwards, but break up when she decides to give JJ another chance. Cole starts scheming with Paige's mother Eve to break the two up. He breaks into JJ's house and plants drugs in his bag. Paige confronts Cole at college. He admits it and tells her she deserves someone better than JJ. Paige asks him to stay away from her and JJ. Cole calls Eve to tell her what happened, but she tells him she is dropping off his money and ends the call, leaving Cole perplexed.

== Melinda Trask ==
Melinda Trask
- Days of Our Lives character
- Portrayed by: Laura Kai Chen (2013–2019); Tina Huang (2020–present)
- Duration: 2013, 2016–present
- First appearance: July 16, 2013
- Created by: Gary Tomlin; Christopher Whitesell
- Introduced by: Ken Corday; Lisa de Cazotte; Greg Meng
In-universe information
- Other names: Melinda Chen
- Occupation: District Attorney; Chief Legal Counsel for DiMera Enterprises
- Spouse: Mr. Trask (ex-husband)
- Daughters: Haley Chen

Melinda Trask is a fictional character on the NBC soap opera Days of Our Lives portrayed by Laura Kai Chen beginning in 2013. In 2020, the role was recast with Tina Huang. In a 2015 lawsuit, Victoria Rowell made claim to have auditioned for the role of Melinda.

Trask is the aggressive District Attorney who wants justice and enjoys sending people to jail when they break the law. One of Melinda's first storylines as the D.A. was prosecuting Sami Brady for Joe Bernardi's murder. Sami was ultimately cleared when evidence proved that she shot Bernardi in defense of Rafe Hernandez, showed up. In 2016, Trask prosecuted Hope Brady for Stefano DiMera's murder, and got her 25 years in prison with no possibility of parole. She has a vendetta against Gabi Hernandez for getting out of jail early after killing Nick Fallon. After Abigail Deveraux murdered Andre DiMera and was diagnosed with DID in 2018 Trask tried to convince Chad to permanently send his wife to Bayview. She explained to Chad that it was the only way to keep himself and Thomas safe. Trask did this to protect Chad and Thomas from Abigail.

Trask is revealed to be the mother of Haley Chen. Although they get off to a rocky start, Melinda and Haley develop a caring relationship. However, Haley's is killed, and Melinda seeks revenge against Kristen DiMera, who pushed Haley down a flight of stairs. She once even accuses Kristen's friend, Detective Lani Price, of helping her to escape. This vendetta against her daughter's killer continued for years.

In 2022, Melinda began a crusade against Chief of Police, Rafe Hernandez who is being falsely accused of abusing his power with prisoners. Melinda's snarky demeanor and power position as Salem DA often place her at odds with Rafe, Shawn-Douglas Brady and Belle Brady among others.

In 2023, Trask is among those drugged by tainted biscuits at Chanel's bakery and pressures the department to find out who did it. Once Colin Bedford and Talia Hunter are exposed, she is ready to throw the book at Talia until she learns that Talia was under Colin's abusive control. Being a victim herself once, Trask recommends probation, community service, and continuing to see Dr. Marlena Evans for counseling. Later, when Paulina becomes mayor, she fired for her actions against Paulina and other people in Salem, but Sloan soon hires her as a lawyer to help with her adoption prospects. After hitting dead ends, opportunity rises when Dimitri gives Nicole's baby to her and Sloan in exchange for a deal in regards to criminal charges. She pays off a doctor to fake the baby's death, so that it looks like the child was adopted legally and sends Dimitri to a supermax prison far from Salem to ensure he could not reveal the truth. She often had to convince Sloan to keep up the ruse in order to protect her and herself from criminal charges. Things get complicated when she learns of Leo's blackmail and has to coerce him to keep him quiet or go to prison like Dimitri.

== Paige Larson ==
Paige Larson
- Days of Our Lives character
- Portrayed by: True O'Brien
- Duration: 2014–2015; 2017; 2020
- First appearance: March 3, 2014
- Last appearance: August 25, 2020
- Created by: Gary Tomlin and Christopher Whitesell
- Introduced by: Ken Corday, Lisa de Cazotte and Greg Meng (2014); Ken Corday, Albert Alarr and Greg Meng (2017)
In-universe information
- Occupation: Student
- Father: Eduardo Hernandez
- Mother: Eve Donovan
- Half-brothers: Rafe Hernandez; Dario Hernandez
- Half-sisters: Arianna Hernandez; Gabi Hernandez
- Grandparents: Shane Donovan; Gabrielle Pascal
- Aunts and uncles: Andrew Donovan; Theresa Donovan
- Nieces: Arianna Horton
- First cousins: Tate Black

Paige Larson was introduced by executive producers Ken Corday, Lisa de Cazotte and Greg Meng. The character is portrayed by True O'Brien and is introduced as a good samaritan who returns JJ Deveraux (Casey Moss) his dropped wallet and is in a relationship with him for majority of her time on the show, however the relationship is ruined by JJ's affair with her mother, Eve Donovan (Kassie DePaiva). Paige is also the niece of Theresa Donovan (Jen Lilley) and, following her death, it is revealed she is the daughter of Eduardo Hernandez, giving her several half-siblings.

In February 2014, Soap Opera Digest announced that model True O'Brien had been cast as Paige Larson on the series. O'Brien made her debut on March 3, 2014. About her audition, O'Brien said "It was an intense process. It was the first time I had really tested for anything. I didn't know what was going on, so I just let it happen. When I walked out of there, I felt good. I was very thankful to have had that opportunity to even experience something like that." In June 2015, it was confirmed that O'Brien was let go from the series, she exited on September 9, 2015 when her character was the second to be killed off as part of the Necktie Killer storyline to commemorate with the show's 50th anniversary. O'Brien returned in flashbacks on September 28, when Paige's death scene was shown and in her mother's visions on October 2, 2015. In October 2017, O'Brien reprises the role of Paige as part of special dream-sequence episode on October 31, 2017. In August 2020, it was announced that O'Brien would once again reprise the role, beginning the week of August 24, 2020.

Paige was born on May 29, 1995 and would grow up with her single mother Eve Donovan. Her father would later be revealed to be Eduardo Hernandez, aka Eddie Larson, making Rafe, Arianna, Dario and Gabi her half-siblings.

In early 2014, Paige arrives in Salem without her mother, Eve (Kassie DePaiva) and quickly develops a connection to JJ Deveraux (Casey Moss). Upon Eve's arrival back to Salem, Paige's relationship with J.J begins to hit a hard spot, ultimately ending with them parting ways multiples times. She becomes close to another guy, Cole Hines (Riley Bodenstab) and asks him out on a date, which he accepts. After their date, Paige meets up with J.J. at the park, where he apologizes profusely and asks for a second chance. She forgives him, leading them to reconcile. Cole finds her at the park watching Parker play and tells her that J.J. will hurt her and that she deserves better, but when he sees that she is not listening to him, he leaves. He then works with her mother Eve to break J.J and Paige up. Cole plants drugs in J.J.'s backpack to frame him. When Paige realizes what Cole has done, she angrily confronts him. At first he denies the accusations, but then Cole tells her how amazing she is and that she deserves better. Paige tells him to stay away from her and J.J before leaving.

Paige would find out that her mother and J.J. had an affair and Jennifer Horton knew about it and she confronts him at her surprise twentieth birthday party. She becomes very cynical and wants nothing to do with them. Paige begins a relationship with Kyle to make J.J jealous, not knowing that he is a drug dealer and that J.J works for him; however, the relationship later ends.

Paige and J.J begin to reconnect the following month. She becomes a witness to Chad and Serena's fight and reveals what she saw, since Serena is later found murdered. Since they become close again, Paige is the first person J.J. tells about the Clyde/drug ring and is sworn not to involve the police. In early September, she would retell what she saw to Rafe and exchanges words with Chad, who does not remember what happened after the fight, and calls J.J afterward; Paige had something to tell him, however, when J.J arrives at her dorm, he finds her in the shower with a tie loosely around her neck. Paige is pronounced dead, much to the horror of J.J and Eve who apologizes to Paige over her body. Chad DiMera is seen as the prime suspect, due to the fact that a flower found near the crime scene can only be found at the DiMera mansion; following the arrest of Chad, he was released after Aiden Jennings was believed to be the Neck Tie Killer. In December 2015, Ben Weston was arrested for the string of murders, following a statement by Abigail Deveraux. In 2017, Paige appears in Abigail's nightmare. In 2020, Paige appears to Eve in a vision, where she tells her to stop taking revenge on Ben.

== Aiden Jennings ==
Aiden Jennings
- Days of Our Lives character
- Portrayed by: Daniel Cosgrove
- Duration: 2014–16
- First appearance: January 22, 2014
- Last appearance: October 25, 2016
- Created by: Gary Tomlin and Christopher Whitesell
- Introduced by: Ken Corday, Lisa de Cazotte and Greg Meng
In-universe information
- Occupation: Lawyer
- Spouse: Meredith Jennings (deceased); Hope Williams Brady (2015–16)
- Children: Chase Jennings
- Stepchildren: Shawn-Douglas Brady; Zack Brady; Ciara Brady

Aiden Jennings was portrayed by Daniel Cosgrove from January 22, 2014, to November 9, 2015, and returned in May 2016. Originally at odds with Hope Williams Brady, they eventually fall in love.

After some time together, Hope starts to suspect Aiden of killing his first wife; however, her death is later revealed an accident caused by Chase. Aiden proposes to Hope and she accepts. Soon after, André DiMera blackmails him into killing Hope or else he will kill Chase. Obeying, Aiden marries Hope and then attempts to kill her. It is later revealed that it was a doppelgänger and not Aiden who tried to kill Hope. The real Aiden loves her too much to go through with it so Andre sent the doppelgänger in his place and held the real Aiden captive. Returning in the nick of time, Hope's former husband, Bo Brady, stops Aiden's doppelgänger by killing him. For a brief time, Aiden is then wrongly believed to have been the Necktie Killer. On October 25, he leaves Salem to care for his son Chase.

Cindy McLennan from TV Series Finale criticised the character, opining that he had become a "sleazy creep" rather in contrast to "the upright (if uptight) attorney and single dad who first captured fans' hearts".

== Chase Jennings ==
Chase Jennings
- Days of Our Lives character
- Portrayed by: Connor Kalopsis (2014–15); Hyrum Hansen (2014; temp.); Jonathon McClendon (2015–16)
- Duration: 2014–16
- First appearance: February 6, 2014
- Last appearance: September 15, 2016
- Created by: Gary Tomlin and Christopher Whitesell
- Introduced by: Ken Corday, Lisa de Cazotte, and Greg Meng
In-universe information
- Parents: Aiden Jennings; Meredith Jennings
- Stepmother: Hope Williams Brady (2015–2016)
- Aunts and uncles: Sharon

Chase Jennings is the son of Aiden and Meredith Jennings, most notable for brutally raping his stepsister, Ciara Brady. Chase and his father arrive in Salem from Portland, Oregon in 2014 and are at odds with Hope and Ciara. Ciara and Chase do not get along with each other and torment each other. Jonathon McClendon assumed the role of Chase on October 21, 2015, when the character was aged due to soap opera rapid aging syndrome. On June 30, 2016, McClendon revealed that he would depart the show. McClendon last aired on September 15, 2016.

Chase is attacked by a man wanting his cell phone. Hope shows up and the man claims that he and his son were having a disagreement, but Hope knows that Chase is not the man's son. She gets Chase away from him and the man is arrested. Aiden arrives and wants to spend the day with Chase but Chase decides to go to judo class. Hope and Aiden become engaged and Ciara and Chase grow closer. When Aiden tries to kill Hope on their wedding night and is shot by Hope's ex-husband Bo, Chase angrily rejects Hope and Ciara's attempts to bring him into the family and accuses Bo of being a murderer.

== Clyde Weston ==
Clyde Weston
- Days of Our Lives character
- Portrayed by: James Read
- Duration: 2014–2024
- First appearance: June 27, 2014
- Last appearance: December 11, 2024
- Created by: Gary Tomlin and Christopher Whitesell
- Introduced by: Ken Corday, Greg Meng and Lisa de Cazotte
In-universe information
- Other names: Jordan Ridgeway
- Occupation: Drug dealer; Businessman
- Sons: Ben Weston
- Stepdaughters: Jordan Ridgeway

Clyde Weston has been portrayed by James Read since June 27, 2014. The character initially departed the role on October 20, 2015. However, he made guest appearances on multiple occasions, including from September 9–October 14, 2016, October 9–11, 2017 and July 6–9, 2018. The character has appeared on a recurring basis since November 19, 2019. Read exited the role when Clyde was shot and entered a coma during the December 11, 2024, episode.

When Kate Roberts investigates Jordan Ridgeway's past, she discovers multiple driver's licenses with different names in her apartment as well as her connection to Salem newcomer Ben Rogers. The evidence leads her to Poplar Bluff, Missouri where she meets with Clyde Weston. Clyde reveals that Ben is his son Ollie, and Jordan is his stepdaughter, Tammy Sue. He also reveals they ran away from home years ago and he failed to find them. Kate tells Clyde they are in Salem. He comes for a reunion but tells her to keep their meeting secret. Ben and Jordan are furious when they see Clyde and it is revealed that Clyde's alcoholism led to verbal and physical abuse of the children and their mother. Clyde insists he has changed and wants a relationship with his son. He asks Kate for contacts from her past dealings with shady business in Salem. Clyde has a meeting with EJ DiMera, who agrees to Clyde's requests to work for his drug ring. They soon argue over drug territory and drugs. During one argument in the park, EJ's disloyal bodyguard Miguel, who Clyde turned against EJ, shoots and kills EJ. Clyde and Miguel cover up the crime and make the scene look like EJ was robbed and killed by a low-level drug addict. Miguel fears EJ's father Stefano DiMera will uncover the truth; Clyde tells his assistant Jeremiah to murder Miguel and bury the body on Jeremiah's grandfather's farm in Missouri.

Clyde tells Jordan that if she interferes with his reconciliation with Ben, he will reveal to Ben that Jordan caused the car wreck that killed their mother. Jordan warns her boyfriend Rafe Hernandez, a detective, that Clyde is dangerous. Rafe becomes suspicious of Clyde and begins investigating him. Clyde begins dating Kate and moves his trucking business, his cover for his drug business, to Salem. Clyde is confronted by Victor Kiriakis who argues that the Kiriakis family runs all trucking operations in Salem; Clyde refuses to back down. Victor investigates Clyde's background and discovers his trucking company and other front businesses are used to launder drug money. Victor also discovers Clyde has managed to seize control of most of the drug business in the Ozarks. Clyde is shot by Victor's hitman Damon and is thought to be dead. Sonny Kiriakis is stabbed in the park and Clyde reveals to Victor that he survived the hit and admits he stabbed Sonny in retaliation. Victor and Clyde call a truce when Victor agrees to let Clyde take over his territory in Salem.

Clyde's relationships with Ben and Kate improve but when he donates a large sum of money to the local hospital to fund Jordan's project, she moves to New York. He continues to advise Ben on his relationship with Abigail Deveraux and plots against Ben's new rival Chad DiMera. Kate fails in her scheme to permanently take over DiMera Enterprises and seeks comfort from Clyde. Clyde dismisses Stefano saying that he can beat the DiMeras. Kate warns Clyde that the DiMeras are cruel and ruthless with their enemies. Stefano uncovers Ben's past activity in illegal gambling in Florida and ensures the club manager testifies against him. Clyde uses his contacts to have the manager killed in prison before he can testify. Clyde finds out Abby cheated on Ben with Chad and discovers she is pregnant. Clyde forces a lab technician to make the tests say Ben is the father. When Stefano returns to Salem, Clyde visits him and secretly places a bug in the DiMera house but Stefano orders him to leave. The bug reveals Abby is due to inherit valuable land in Ireland that the DiMeras desperately want. Chad refuses to go along with Stefano's plan to reconcile with Abby and thus get the land. Clyde begins to think Ben and he will benefit from Abby's inheritance. Stefano meets with Victor about Clyde. Victor reveals to Stefano his past dealings with Clyde and assures Stefano that Clyde is a serious threat to both of them and their families. Stefano and Victor agree to work together against Clyde.

Kate breaks up with Clyde when he becomes controlling, saying his confidence was attractive at first but he is arrogant. Clyde is revealed to be local drug dealer Kyle Southern's boss. Kyle, who is dating Paige Larson, hires her ex-boyfriend JJ Deveraux, unaware that JJ is secretly working with the DEA and Salem police commissioner Roman Brady. Paige's mother Eve Donovan tells Kyle that JJ is working with the DEA. Kyle tells Clyde that he needs to personally deal with the situation. Clyde arrives at Kyle's apartment and Kyle knocks JJ unconscious. JJ awakens to find that Clyde has killed Kyle and Clyde asks if JJ is working with the police. JJ tells Clyde that he had an affair with Eve which caused Paige to disown Eve and in revenge Eve made up the story and told Kyle. Clyde believes JJ and hires him to replace Kyle. Clyde threatens to kill JJ's mother Jennifer Horton, sister Abigail, and ex-girlfriend Paige if he tells Ben about their drug deals. Later Paige is found dead in her dorm and JJ accuses Clyde of murdering Paige. A secret investigation of Clyde leads to a sting operation involving JJ, Roman Brady, and DEA agent Watts, which leads to his arrest for drug trafficking. Clyde discovers during his arrest that JJ was secretly an informant and that Clyde's drug ring has been exposed to the Salem Police and DEA. He calls his son Ben and claims to be set up by JJ but Roman reveals that Clyde is being extradited to Florida for a murder charge there. On October 20, 2015, Ben is brought to a meeting at the police station with Clyde who tells Ben he is being extradited to Florida that day. Ben reveals to Clyde that he is the Necktie Killer.

In 2016, Chad reveals that Clyde is imprisoned in a federal penitentiary for murder. That September, Marlena visits Clyde in prison and he asks her to evaluate him. Clyde says he would rather be stuck in prison than deal with the people of Salem. Clyde and Orpheus bond over their mutual dislike of the people of Salem and plot a breakout. Clyde gets transferred into Orpheus' cell and recruits Xander Kiriakis. During a transfer, Eduardo Hernandez kills an inmate, believing he was responsible for threatening their family. Orpheus knocks the driver unconscious and the prison van crashes. Clyde makes his way to Kate's house and threatens her with a gun. Chad DiMera arrives and the two fight; Clyde manages to escape before the police arrive. Clyde, Xander, and Orpheus regroup. Clyde has some of his old contacts provide them with new clothes and weapons. The trio kidnap Kayla Brady and Joey Johnson. Steve Johnson attempts to rattle Clyde and Xander's faith in Orpheus. Steve and Orpheus get into a fight and the trio get away. Clyde and Orpheus corner Marlena, Claire, and Kate at the pier. John arrives and Orpheus is shot in the struggle. The trio decide to publicly make their demands known and flee to the Kiriakis compound. Clyde finds a case full of weaponry that his former partner-in-crime Jeremiah arranged for him. Getting a good vantage point, Clyde waits for Orpheus to make their demands known before he attempts to shoot Aiden Jennings. He accidentally shoots Abe Carver instead and flees before the Salem Police can retaliate. Wracked with guilt over shooting an innocent man, Clyde starts drinking and tells Orpheus his life's story: he was abused by his father and realizes that he treated his children the way his father treated him. He also expresses regret that Jordan wants nothing to do with him. Orpehus orders Clyde and Xander to watch Joey while he goes to kill John Black. Clyde stands guard on the pier and Abe's son Theo Carver confronts him with a gun. He hesitates and Clyde takes advantage of the opportunity. Steve and J.J. reveal themselves, and Clyde flees while sending a text message to Orpehus, telling him to "abort". Clyde decides to kill Chad and kidnap his son Thomas DiMera. After stealing some baby clothes for Thomas, Clyde encounters Andre DiMera, and is shocked that Stefano has another son. Clyde threatens to kill him, but Andre offers to help him get into the DiMera mansion and kidnap Thomas. With Andre's help, Clyde gets into the mansion through the secret tunnels and holds Chad at gunpoint. After Andre leaves the room, Chad and Clyde fight until Andre returns with Lucas Horton and Adrienne Johnson tied up. Clyde tries to threaten them into telling him where Thomas is, but Andre shoots Chad. Clyde looks for Thomas. He hears a baby crying, and follows it into a booby-trapped room where he waits for the Salem Police to arrest him. Clyde is brought into the main room where he learns Chad is fine. He warns Chad to watch his back around Andre, but Chad is confident he does not have anything to worry about. Clyde rages that the baby belongs to his son Ben, before being dragged out of the mansion. Once at the Salem Police station, Aiden is happy to book Clyde and make sure that not only would he be back in prison, but he would be held in solitary confinement for a long time. On October 13, John reveals that Clyde is back serving his original 25 to life prison sentence and that new charges from the prison break have also been added to his sentence.

== Serena Mason ==
Serena Mason
- Days of Our Lives character
- Portrayed by: Melissa Archer
- Duration: 2014–15, 2017
- First appearance: December 5, 2014
- Last appearance: October 31, 2017
- Created by: Gary Tomlin and Christopher Whitesell
- Introduced by: Ken Corday, Lisa de Cazotte and Greg Meng
In-universe information
- Occupation: Medical journalist

Serena Mason is a fictional character on the NBC daytime soap opera, Days of Our Lives. The role was played by Melissa Archer from December 5, 2014, to August 28, 2015, and a brief reappearance on September 28, 2015. Archer returned to the role once again during a one-off appearance on October 31, 2017.

Serena is introduced as a friend of Melanie Jonas (Molly Burnett) and a former lover of Eric Brady (Greg Vaughan) during the pair's time in South Africa, prior to Eric's joining of the priesthood. Serena has a rivalry with Nicole Walker due to her past with Eric and her fascination for one of Eric's African artifacts, which were revealed to have been used to smuggle blood diamonds. Serena confesses that she was forced to use Eric to smuggle the diamonds out of Africa by Eric's former friend and Serena's former lover Xander Kiriakis. When Serena's secret is revealed, Eric breaks up with her, and he and Nicole are nearly killed by Xander. She ends up back in Eric's good graces when she saves his grandmother Caroline Brady's life. In August 2015, Serena is sued by Nicole due to her involvement with Xander. After a drunken night at Club TBD with Chad DiMera, she is murdered by a serial killer and Chad is named the prime suspect. It was later revealed Ben Weston murdered her. That December, Ben is later arrested for the murder of Serena and his other victims. On Halloween 2017, Serena is a part of Abigail Deveraux's nightmare, in which she murders Chad and Abigail.

In August 2014, Soap Opera Digest reported that former One Life to Live actress Melissa Archer, famous for her 12-year stint of Natalie Buchanan has been cast in an unknown contract role, later revealed to be Serena Mason, the ex-girlfriend of Eric Brady (Greg Vaughan). She made her first appearance on December 5, 2014. In April 2015, Soap Opera Digest confirmed Archer had been let go from the show. Archer last aired on August 27, 2015, when her character was killed off as part of a serial killer storyline to commemorate with the show's 50th anniversary. Archer appeared in additional flashback scenes on September 28, 2015, when Serena's death at the hands of the Necktie Killer were shown. In October 2017, Archer reprised the role of Serena as part of a special dream-sequence episode on October 31, 2017.

In 2021, Richard Simms from Soaps She Knows put Serena on his list of the most hated soap opera characters, commenting that viewers were "more likely to remember the endlessly discussed elephant statue" sought by Serena rather than Serena herself, and noted that the actress had been popular as Natalie Buchanan on One Life to Live.

== Tori Narita ==
Tori Narita
- Days of Our Lives character
- Portrayed by: Hiro Ambrosino
- First appearance: January 20, 2015
- Last appearance: May 6, 2015
- Created by: Gary Tomlin; Christopher Whitesell
- Introduced by: Ken Corday; Lisa de Cazotte; Greg Meng
In-universe information
- Parents: Hiro Narita
- Children: Paul Narita

Tori Narita is the mother of Paul Narita and was portrayed by Hira Ambrosino from January 20, 2015, to May 6, 2015.

== Tate Black ==
Tate Black
- Days of Our Lives character
- Portrayed by: Peter & Thomas Machala (2015–2016); Matthew & Nathan Goss (2016); Jacob & Wyatt Walker (2016–2018); Colin & Kyle Schroeder (2018); Jamie Martin Mann (2023–2024); Leo Howard (2024–present)
- Duration: 2015–2018, 2023–present
- First appearance: March 30, 2015
- Created by: Gary Tomlin and Christopher Whitesell
- Introduced by: Ken Corday, Lisa de Cazotte and Greg Meng (2015); Ken Corday and Albert Alarr (2023)
In-universe information
- Other names: Christopher DiMera; Tate Donovan Black
- Father: Brady Black
- Mother: Theresa Donovan
- Half-sisters: Rachel Black
- Grandfathers: John Black; Shane Donovan
- Grandmothers: Isabella Toscano; Kimberly Brady; Marlena Evans (step)
- Uncles: Paul Narita; Andrew Donovan IV; Eric Brady (step)
- Aunts: Belle Black; Eve Donovan; Sami Brady (step)
- First cousins: Claire Brady; Paige Larson
- Other relatives: Shawn Brady; Caroline Brady; Victor Kiriakis; Xander Kiriakis

Tate Black is the son of Brady Black and Theresa Donovan.

In November 2014, Theresa discovered she was pregnant with Brady's child. Kristen DiMera overheard Theresa sharing her news and decided to steal the embryo. Before Theresa has a chance to tell Brady about the pregnancy, Kristen sets her plan in motion. She hires goons to knock Theresa unconscious and they take her to a warehouse outfitted with gurneys and other medical supplies. Kristen arrives at the warehouse and the procedure begins. Brady and Theresa's embryo is transferred into Kristen's womb. Afterward, Kristen calls Brady to tell him that she will be leaving town with a piece of him. Kristen leaves town and evidence of Theresa's pregnancy is erased. Brady does not believe Theresa when she eventually gets the chance to tell him she was pregnant.

The baby appeared for the first time on March 30. On April 14, it is revealed that Kristen gave birth in Italy and named Brady and Theresa's baby boy, Christopher, presumably after herself. Melanie Jonas finds out what happened and tells Brady. Brady goes to Italy and finds Kristen with Christopher, along with Theresa who had been kidnapped by Kristen. Brady and Theresa are reunited with Christopher and Kristen is presumed deceased. The baby boy is returned to his parents thanks to Melanie and taken home to Salem. He undergoes a successful bone marrow transplant, with his mother as the donor. Later, his parents rename him Tate Donovan Black.

The teenage Tate returns to Salem in 2023 after being kicked out of boarding school for a prank gone wrong. He is forced to worked off his debt at the Brady Pub, but he encounters Holly Jonas and develops a friendship with her.

== Thomas DiMera ==
Thomas DiMera
- Days of Our Lives character
- Portrayed by: Grace & Jeffrey G. (2015); Elowen & Willow S. (2015–2017); Justin Allan (2018); Asher Morrissette (2018–2019); Cary Christopher (2020–2026); Alexander Elijah Bond (2026); Cole Gersmeyer (since 2026)
- Duration: 2015–present
- First appearance: November 24, 2015
- Created by: Josh Griffith and Dena Higley
- Introduced by: Ken Corday, Albert Alarr and Greg Meng; Ken Corday and Noel Maxam (2026)
In-universe information
- Other names: Colin Weston; Thomas Jack Deveraux
- Family: DiMera; Horton; Johnson
- Father: Chad DiMera
- Mother: Abigail Deveraux
- Sisters: Charlotte DiMera
- Half-sisters: Grace McCormick-Woods
- Grandfathers: Stefano DiMera; Jack Deveraux
- Grandmothers: Madeline Peterson Woods; Jennifer Horton
- Uncles: André DiMera; Tony DiMera (legal); Peter Blake (adoptive); Benjy Hawk; EJ DiMera; JJ Deveraux; Stefan DiMera; Jake Lambert
- Aunts: Kristen DiMera (adoptive); Renée DuMonde; Megan Hathaway; Lexie Carver
- First cousins: Dimitri Von Leuschner; Theo Carver; Steven Hawk; Johnny DiMera; Sydney DiMera; Rachel Black (adoptive)
- Other relatives: Arianna Horton

Thomas DiMera is the son of Chad DiMera and Abigail Deveraux. He is also the nephew of JJ Deveraux, and the grandson of Stefano DiMera, Madeline Peterson Woods, Jennifer Horton, and Jack Deveraux. Currently portrayed by Cary Christopher, who took over the role on May 27, 2020. He departed the role on February 17, 2026, when Thomas left for Arizona with Chad and Charlotte. Alexander Elijah Bond assumed the role when Thomas returned on April 21 of the same year. In August 2026, Bond exited the role, with Cole Gersmeyer recast as his replacement.

== Deimos Kiriakis ==
Deimos Kiriakis
- Days of Our Lives character
- Portrayed by: Vincent Irizarry
- Duration: 2016–17, 2021
- First appearance: January 18, 2016
- Last appearance: November 2, 2021
- Created by: Josh Griffith and Dena Higley
- Introduced by: Ken Corday, Albert Alarr and Greg Meng
In-universe information
- Other names: Robert Tasso
- Occupation: Businessman; Crime boss
- Family: Kiriakis
- Father: Yurgos Kiriakis
- Half-brothers: Victor Kiriakis; Alexander Kiriakis; Titus Kiriakis
- Spouse: Eve Donovan (2017)
- Grandfathers: Demetrius Kiriakis
- Grandmothers: Antonia Kiriakis
- Aunts and uncles: Aristotle Kiriakis; Athena Kiriakis
- Nieces and nephews: Bo Brady; Isabella Toscano; Philip Kiriakis; Justin Kiriakis; Xander Kiriakis
- Other relatives: Brady Black; Shawn-Douglas Brady; Chelsea Brady; Zack Brady; Ciara Brady; Tyler Kiriakis; Alexander Kiriakis; Victor Kiriakis II (adoptive); Joseph Kiriakis (adoptive); Sonny Kiriakis; Claire Brady; Tate Black; Rachel Black

Deimos Kiriakis was portrayed by Vincent Irizarry. He is the half-brother of crime boss Victor Kiriakis.

Deimos arrives in Salem at the Kiriakis mansion where he is confronted at gunpoint by Victor. Its revealed that Deimos is Victor's brother and has spent the past 30 years of a life sentence in prison. Deimos says he does not want revenge against Victor but only wants to rebuild his life and asks Victor for a job. Victor tells Deimos he is not welcome or wanted in Salem and is dead to him, but Deimos replies that it is because he reminds Victor of his past, which he cannot escape. Victor introduces Deimos to his son Philip Kiriakis but tells Philip to stay away from Deimos because he is trouble.

Later, Victor reveals his past history with Deimos to his wife Maggie: 30 years ago Deimos, the 20-year-old son of Victor's father and his second wife, had a "big mouth and big chip on his shoulder" and wanted everything that was Victor's including Victor's fiancée Helena Tasso. Four days before Victor and Helena's wedding day, Deimos seduced Helena. An enraged and furious Victor confronted Helena, who admitted it and ran off to Deimos. The following morning, Helena was found dead at the bottom of a cliff. According to the police, Helena had help jumping off the cliff and Deimos was sentenced to life in prison. Victor, unable to look at anything reminding him of Helena, left Greece for a fresh start in the United States. On June 29, 2017, Deimos is stabbed in the chest and he is pronounced dead by Hope Brady. Deimos continued making appearances until October 30, 2017. He then reappeared briefly in 2021.

== Summer Townsend ==
Summer Townsend
- Days of Our Lives character
- Portrayed by: Marie Wilson
- Duration: 2016, 2020
- First appearance: February 2, 2016
- Last appearance: January 21, 2020
- Created by: Josh Griffith and Dena Higley
- Introduced by: Ken Corday, Albert Alarr and Greg Meng
In-universe information
- Other names: Cindi Callahan; Danielle Katherine Mullen
- Occupation: Con-artist
- Father: Noah
- Mother: Maggie Horton
- Half-brothers: Daniel Jonas
- Half-sisters: Melissa Horton (adoptive); Sarah Horton; Janice Barnes (foster)
- Grandparents: Elmer Simmons; Dorothy Simmons
- Nephews: Nathan Horton (adoptive); Parker Jonas
- Nieces: Melanie Jonas; Holly Jonas Mackenzie Horton Victoria Cook

Summer Townsend is a fictional character from the American NBC Daytime soap opera Days of Our Lives, portrayed by former Port Charles and As the World Turns actress Marie Wilson. Wilson previously played the recurring role of Bree Tjaden on the soap from October 31, 2014, until February 9, 2015. In October 2015, Wilson was announced to return on Days of Our Lives in a newly created role. Wilson made her first appearance as Summer on February 2, 2016. One month after her debuted aired, it was revealed that Wilson was among four actors let go from the show, following the departures of head writers Josh Griffith and Beth Milstein. Wilson last aired on July 29, 2016. The character reappeared in a one-off guest appearance on January 21, 2020, in a special Mother's Day flashback episode to heatedly tell her mother Maggie Kiriakis she was dying of cirrhosis of the liver. She blamed Maggie for her alcoholism and flaunted alcohol in her face.

In the Fall of 2021, Maggie confirms that Summer has died.

In 2021, Richard Simms from Soaps She Knows put Summer on his list of the most hated soap opera characters, commenting that "She may have been introduced as Brady Black's literal dream girl on Days of Our Lives, but the daughter Maggie Horton had given up for adoption years earlier proved something of a nightmare for the residents of Salem."

== Sheila Watkins ==
Sheila Watkins was played by Tionne Watkins from November 2016 to January 2017, and again from September 2017 to November 2017. She returned to the role in September 2018 and made a brief appearance in April 2020. Sheila and her friend Coco are prison inmates who harass Hope Brady in prison. They also attempt to intimidate any new inmates, but Hope protects them while she is protected by Chille. Sheila and Coco realize they will never be able to get to Hope with Chille there, so they kill Chille by stabbing her in the chest. The duo later attacks Hope in her cell and stabs her, but she survives and is admitted to the prison hospital. Hope intended to fight back against them, but Hattie helped her escape, so they attacked her and put her in the hospital.

In September 2017, Sheila is released from Statesville. Adrienne Johnson convinces her to go to the Kiriakis mansion and give a letter to Justin Kiriakis. Everyone believes Adrienne is Bonnie Lockhart, but Sheila decides to humour "Bonnie", and soon finds out she was telling the truth when she comes face to face with Bonnie, who is staying at the mansion. Sheila is persuaded to keep quiet by accepting payment from Bonnie and takes a job as a maid at the Kiriakis mansion. Sheila reconnects with her old friend Eli Grant, and eventually flees town when Bonnie is exposed.

Sheila returns in late 2018 to help Bonnie when she is arrested. Sheila brings Bonnie's assumed daughter with Lucas as a way for Bonnie to get out of prison. Sheila does not believe Bonnie's claim that the child belongs to her and Lucas.

== Holly Jonas ==
Holly Jonas
- Days of Our Lives character
- Portrayed by: Cara and Sienna Gwartz (2016–2017); Taytum And Oakley Fisher (2017); Harlow and Scarlett Mallory (2018–2020); Elin Alexander (2020–2022); Ashley Puzemis (2023–present)
- Duration: 2016–present
- First appearance: December 21, 2016
- Created by: Dena Higley and Ryan Quan
- Introduced by: Ken Corday, Albert Alarr and Greg Meng
In-universe information
- Other names: Holly Lane; Holly Walker
- Family: Walker; Jonas
- Father: Daniel Jonas
- Mother: Nicole Walker
- Stepfather: EJ DiMera
- Half-brothers: Parker Jonas; Daniel DiMera; Jude Brady
- Half-sisters: Melanie Jonas
- Grandfathers: Paul Mendez; George Jonas (legal)
- Grandmothers: Fay Walker; Maggie Horton; Lillian Parker Jonas (adoptive)
- Uncles: Brandon Walker
- Aunts: Janice Barnes (foster); Summer Townsend; Melissa Horton (adoptive); Sarah Horton; Taylor Walker
- First cousins: Nathan Horton (adoptive); Mackenzie Horton; Victoria Horton-Cook

Holly Fay Jonas is the biological daughter of Nicole Walker and Daniel Jonas, but was carried by Chloe Lane, who did not reveal Holly's biological parents until after her birth. Chloe was implanted with the embryo after Daniel's death. Holly is also the surrogate daughter of Eric Brady given he raised her as his own daughter and she called him dad once.

She was born on December 21, 2016, delivered by her mother Nicole. a grueling custody battle over Holly went on between Nicole and Chloe until the latter decide to give her to Nicole. In 2023, Holly was aged up to a teenager who is infatuated with Johnny DiMera. Later, it's revealed she is a drug addict and when she overdoses at a New Year's Eve party, Tate Black is mistakenly arrested as the one who gave her the drugs. After being in a coma for months, Holly awakens and she eventually comes clean about her addition to free Tate and clear his name. They soon grow closer, but Tate' mom, Theresa Donovan, wants him to have nothing to do with her because of her bad influence, a sentiment shared with Brady, Nicole and EJ, her current step-father. However, the two continue their relationship in secret despite others knowing.

== Tripp Dalton ==
Tripp Dalton
- Days of Our Lives character
- Portrayed by: Lucas Adams
- Duration: 2017–2024
- First appearance: March 23, 2017
- Last appearance: April 29, 2024
- Created by: Dena Higley and Ryan Quan (Note: The announcement of Steve and Ava's child was shown in 2016, under executive producers Ken Corday, Albert Alarr and Greg Meng and head writers Josh Griffith and Dena Higley. The character was later developed and introduced under Corday, Alarr, Meng and head writers, Higley and Ryan Quan.)
- Introduced by: Ken Corday, Albert Alarr and Greg Meng
- Spin-off appearances: Days of Our Lives: A Very Salem Christmas (2021); Days of Our Lives: Beyond Salem (2022)
In-universe information
- Other names: Tripp Johnson
- Occupation: Medical student; Hospital assistant; Waiter
- Father: Steve Johnson
- Mother: Ava Vitali
- Adoptive father: Silas Dalton
- Adoptive mother: Veronica Dalton
- Half-brothers: Joey Johnson; Charlie Dale
- Half-sisters: Stephanie Johnson
- Grandparents: Duke Johnson; Jo Johnson; Martino Vitali
- Aunts and uncles: Jack Deveraux; Adrienne Johnson
- Nephews: Henry Horton
- First cousins: Sonny Kiriakis; Gwen Rizczech; Abigail Deveraux; JJ Deveraux; Joey Kiriakis (adoptive); Victor Kiriakis II (adoptive)

Tripp Dalton (also Johnson) is a fictional character on the long-running NBC soap opera Days of Our Lives portrayed by Lucas Adams. The character was first referenced in January 2016, as the presumed dead son of Steve Johnson and his ex-lover, mafia princess Ava Vitali (Tamara Braun). The character was later developed and introduced by Dena Higley and Ryan Quan on March 23, 2017. Adams exited the role on August 29, 2019; he returned to the role on September 4, 2020. In November 2020, it was revealed that Charlie Dale (Mike Manning), who is the son of Ava and the half-brother of Tripp was the one who raped Allie Horton (Lindsay Arnold) in London and fathered her son Henry. In January 2021, Tripp finally learns the truth about his brother Charlie after his father Steve and John Black (Drake Hogestyn) traveled to Philadelphia to visit Ava's cousin Angelo Vitali for answers about a blood relative of the family who raped Allie and they learned that Ava has another son named Charlie after she had Tripp, but he was raised by his father.

== Stefan DiMera ==
Stefan DiMera
- Days of Our Lives character
- Portrayed by: Tyler Christopher (2017–2019); Brandon Barash (2019–2024)
- Duration: 2017–2020, 2022–2024
- First appearance: December 29, 2017
- Last appearance: October 28, 2024
- Created by: Ron Carlivati
- Introduced by: Albert Alarr, Ken Corday and Greg Meng
In-universe information
- Other names: Sam Maitland (birth name); Stefan Octavius DiMera
- Occupation: Businessman
- Father: Stefano DiMera
- Mother: Vivian Alamain
- Brothers: Jake Lambert
- Half-brothers: André DiMera; Peter Blake (adoptive); Quinn Hudson; Benjy Hawk; EJ DiMera; Chad DiMera; Tony DiMera
- Half-sisters: Kristen DiMera (adoptive); Renée DuMonde; Megan Hathaway; Lexie Carver
- Spouse: Abigail Deveraux (2018); Gabi Hernandez (2019–2022, 2023–2025)
- Grandfathers: Santo DiMera
- Uncles: Leopold Alamain
- Nieces and nephews: Dimitri Von Leuschner; Theo Carver; Steven Hawk; Johnny DiMera; Sydney DiMera; Grace Brady; Thomas DiMera; Charlotte DiMera; Rachel Black (adoptive); Daniel DiMera
- First cousins: John Black (adoptive); Lawrence Alamain

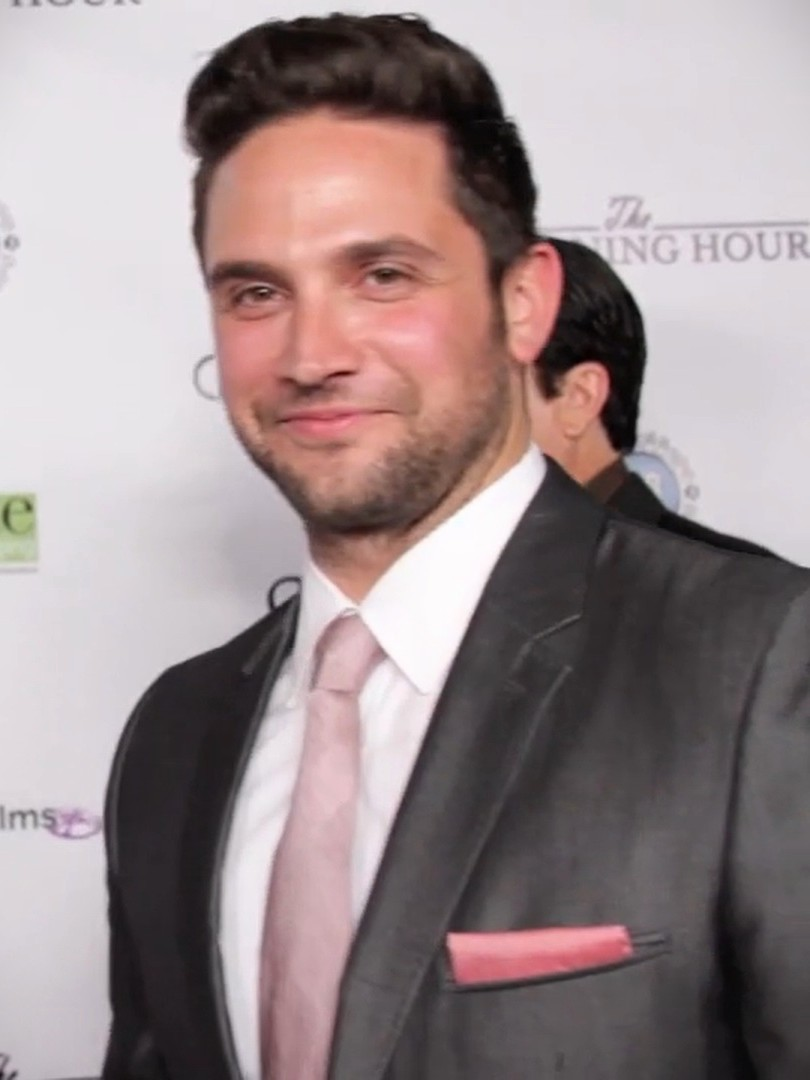
Brandon Barash (pictured) was recast in the role following the departure of Tyler Christopher

Stefan DiMera, originally portrayed by Tyler Christopher, made his first appearance on December 29, 2017. Christopher vacated the role on March 20 and was replaced by Brandon Barash on March 22, 2019. Barash departed the role on October 11, 2019, when Stefan was killed off; briefly reappeared on May 4, 2020, during a hallucination. Barash returned to the role in 2022, and will exit again in October 2024. Stefan is the previously unknown son of Vivian Alamain (Louise Sorel) and Stefano DiMera (Joseph Mascolo). Stefan forces his way into the DiMera family making enemies with his half-brothers Chad (Billy Flynn) and André (Thaao Penghlis) and sisters-in-law Abigail (Marci Miller) and Kate (Lauren Koslow) when he takes over DiMera Enterprises and buys the family mansion out from under them. Christopher's most notable story includes Stefan's obsession and with Abigail's alternate personality, Gabby. Stefan falls for Gabby when after he frames Gabi Hernandez (Camila Banus) for André's murder to protect her. When Abigail gets pregnant, Stefan is ecstatic to learn he fathered her daughter Charlotte. In late 2018, Stefan marries a newly divorced Abigail as she tries to avoid being committed by Chad. But after she gives birth, Chad convinces Stefan to have her committed anyway for her own good. Abigail poses as Gabby to get released and has the marriage to Stefan annulled. Soon after, Stefan is devastated to learn that a spiteful Gabi tampered with Charlotte's paternity test to get revenge for framing her, and Chad is Charlotte's father.

After learning Charlotte was not his daughter, Stefan slowly fell in love with Gabi and the two scheme to take control of DiMera and later get married. While helping his mother leave Salem, he is shot by Lani Price thus saving Vivian. Stefan was taken to the hospital where he was pronounced brain dead. Dr. Wilhelm Rolf claimed his serum would not work as Stefan had no brain activity. He was taken off life support and his heart was given to Julie Olson Williams, who was in the hospital too. However, years later, it is revealed Rolf took Stefan's body and kept him alive with an artificial heart, provided by Li Shin through the company's funds, until a proper transplant could be made. The death of his twin brother, Jake, provided the heart Stefan needed to live again.

He remarries Gabi after regaining his memories following a brainwashing attempt from Dr. Rolf. The two continued to fight EJ for control of DiMera Enterprises. When she was framed and arrested for Li Shin's murder, Clyde Weston blackmails him into doing his bidding for her protection. Working with Ava Vitali, he ad sex with her during a drunken conversation which he instantly regretted. Eventually, Gabi was released and found out about the affair and she wanted a divorce. When she sleeps with EJ to get even, he decides to file the paperwork as they clearly both don't want to salvage the marriage or get passed the affairs. He files the papers with Melinda Trask's help but reconsiders fighting for her. However, his mother and Ivan kidnap Stefan and send him to Alamainia to start over and keep him away from Gabi and finalize their divorce.

Stefan is notable for being Ron Carlivati's very first creation as head writer since his appointment in January 2017. Christopher had previously worked under Carlivati on ABC's General Hospital where Christopher played Nikolas Cassadine until the summer of 2016. It took nearly six months for the writers to set the stage for Stefan's arrival. The role was conceived in an effort to continue the legacy of the legendary Stefano DiMera.

Viewers and critics alike were very excited about the Emmy winner's return to daytime, while others were saddened that Christopher would not return to General Hospital. Due to intense secrecy around the character's identity, there was much speculation about who Christopher would portray, with many assuming he'd been hired as a recast of another role. Tanya Clark from Soap Opera Spy was especially excited about Carlivati getting to write for Christopher again. In 2019, Christopher was nominated for a Daytime Emmy Award for Outstanding Lead Actor.

In 2020, Candace Young from Soaps She Knows put Stefan on her list of the hottest soap opera villains and said that Stefan "was a ruthless and cold sort, but his sexual escapades with Gabi were smoking hot".

== Leo Stark ==
Leo Stark
- Days of Our Lives character
- Portrayed by: Greg Rikaart
- Duration: 2018–present
- First appearance: March 27, 2018
- Created by: Ron Carlivati
- Introduced by: Albert Alarr, Ken Corday and Greg Meng
- Spin-off appearances: Days of Our Lives: Beyond Salem (2021); Days of Our Lives: A Very Salem Christmas (2021)
In-universe information
- Other names: Matthew Cooper; Leo Kiriakis
- Occupation: Con artist; Prostitute; Journalist
- Mother: Diana Colville
- Spouse: Sonny Kiriakis (2018–2019); Darius Rose (2021–2022); Javi Hernandez (m. 2026)

Leo Stark is a fictional character on the long running NBC soap opera Days of Our Lives, and is portrayed by The Young and the Restless alumni Greg Rikaart. He debuted in the role on March 27, 2018. The role was only supposed to last for a couple of episodes. Rikaart vacated the role on July 3, 2018, but returned on November 28, 2018, to March 26, 2019. For his role as Leo, Greg Rikaart received an Emmy nomination as Outstanding Supporting Actor in a Drama Series in 2019. The character reappeared in a one-off guest appearance on April 1, 2020, for a special April Fools episode. He then appeared in two spinoffs in 2021.

Leo was hired by Vivian Alamain (Louise Sorel) to date Sonny Kiriakis (Freddie Smith), and then intern at TITAN where Sonny was CEO. Not wanting to mix business with pleasure, Sonny broke up with Leo, but Vivian then ordered Leo to seduce Sonny as his employee, presumably create a scandal. Leo is found out by Kate Roberts (Lauren Koslow), who enlists him to continue the takedown of TITAN after Vivian is killed. Leo gets a hold of Sonny's phone and sends dirty harassing texts to himself. He later tells Sonny that he will quit his job and they make love in the office while a hidden camera catches it all before Sonny can get Leo's resignation in writing. Kate hired Ted Laurent (Gilles Marini) to represent Leo, and he successfully used the texts and the video to their advantage. Eventually, Kate wanted to drop the lawsuit and wanted Leo to take a settlement, which would be next to nothing by the time Ted got his share. Leo went to Sonny and emotionally blackmailed him into marrying him, but then Will Horton (Chandler Massey) showed up and exposed Leo as a prostitute. He also revealed Leo's real name was Matthew Cooper. Leo lost his patience and started strangling Will. Sonny pushed Leo away from Will, and he runs face first into a fireplace, and dies.

However, Leo turns up alive and taunts Sonny and Will. He blackmails Sonny with the attempted murder into marrying him. After the wedding, Gabi Hernandez (Camila Banus) helps Will and Sonny to have some alone time and ties Leo to a bed. Upset about this, Leo then goes to the police and wants Sonny arrested for the attempted murder. He later drops the charges. Leo's mother turns out to be Diana Colville (Judith Chapman), who insists that John Black (Drake Hogestyn) is Leo's biological father. However, Diana is lying and Leo eventually leaves town, after nothing is keeping him in Salem anymore.

He appeared in two specials in 2021. Days of Our Lives: Beyond Salem where he is caught between Will and Sonny during a jewel hunt and inadvertently saves people in the process, and later appeared as a fictionalized version of himself in Days of Our Lives: A Very Salem Christmas.

In 2022, Leo returns to Salem with a new boyfriend who turns out to be Craig Wesley, Chloe Lane's father. When it's discovered he was conning him, despite developing real feelings for him, Craig broke it off with Leo and returned to New York. He continues scheming in Salem with Gwen Risczech, even working as a gossip columnist when she takes the Salem Spector from Jack and Jennifer, until he encounters Dimitri Von Leuschner, whom he encountered before in Beyond Salem. He figured out the crook was conning Gwen in order to receive an inheritance. However, the two make love after he comes clean to Leo that he's really gay. He offers Leo a share of the money in exchange for his silence, but the truth comes out and Gwen bashes the two for lying to her. He later helps Dimitri evade police custody after he attempted to kill Gabi and Stefan for trying to blackmail him. Encountering Nicole, she goes into labor and they help deliver her baby. The baby ends up with Sloan Peterson and Melinda Trask, who fake the baby's death so Sloan can adopt the baby for her and Eric, in exchange for Dimitri turning himself in for Leo's freedom. Leo attempts to tell Nicole the truth but is punched and rebuked by EJ. He decides instead to blackmail Sloan until she gives the child back to Nicole.

In 2024, Leo meets Javi Hernandez who is Rafe and Gabi's cousin. The two fall in love and Leo moves into the Hernandez house to be with Javi. Javi opened up to Leo about his daughter, Solina who died after her mother forgot her in the car on a hot day. He also tells Leo about how he was a Paramedic in Texas, but left because he was discriminated against for being gay. With Leo's encouragement, Javi joins the Salem Fire Department as a Paramedic. In July 2025, Javi takes in a baby boy that was left at the Fire Department. He and Leo raise the baby together and name him Tesoro (Spanish for Treasure). It later turns out that Tesoro was Sophia Choi's baby with Aaron Greene (Sophia originally thought Tate Black was the father). Since Javi is still heart broken over the loss of Solina, He tells Leo that he doesn't want to adopt Tesoro. Tesoro is later adopted by Chanel and Johnny DiMera, who changes Tesoro's name to Trey and make Leo and Javi his godfathers. On Thanksgiving Day 2025, Leo proposes to Javi with his mother's engagement ring that she initially left to Rafe. Leo and Javi get married, but Dimitri returns and reveals that he was being kept hostage on an island. He tries winning Leo back as he still loves him, but Leo decides to remain with Javi. However, Leo and Dimitri kiss and Javi discovers this. Javi ends up leaving Salem to care for his father and his marriage to Leo is not filed, leaving Leo heartbroken.

== Ted Laurent ==
Theodore "Ted" Laurent is a fictional character on the NBC soap Days of Our Lives. Ted has been played by Gilles Marini since June 5, 2018. In November 2018, Gilles was upgraded to contract.

Ted is Leo Stark's lawyer, hired by Kate Roberts, to represent Leo in his attempt to sue Sonny Kiriakis for sexual assault. Ted knew the suit was, and Leo was worried that Ted could not be trusted. Ted and Kate assured Leo all he cared about was making money, and he would be making a lot after the settlement Sonny would be forced to pay. Ted was confident that he would win in court as Leo had already sent dirty texts to himself using Sonny's phone and used a hidden camera to take photos of him and Sonny in a compromising situation. Ted used the texts to make Sonny seem like a predator, and the fact that he slept with Leo before he officially handed in his letter of resignation did not look good for Sonny. Ted also pursued Kate. He brought dinner to Kate's room and they talked and bonded. Ted admitted his wife had died from cancer and Kate would relate to since she was recently widowed due to her husband being murdered.

Ted was hired by Theresa Donovan to represent her when she sued Brady Black for custody of their son, Tate Black. Theresa's argument was not strong enough, so the judge adjourned for the day.

== Haley Chen ==
Haley Chen is a fictional character on the NBC soap opera Days of Our Lives portrayed by Thia Megia.

She first appeared on December 20, 2018, as a troubled nurse who attempts suicide but is saved by JJ Deveraux.

At the hospital, Haley overhears her boss Dr. Kayla Johnson being upset with J.J. for not reporting Haley's suicide attempt. Haley jumps into conclusion, feels betrayed thinking J.J. told Kayla. However they reassure her that JJ is innocent and that it was another nurse who came forward leaving Kayla with no choice but to take Haley off of the nursing floor until the matter is resolved. Later on at the hospital, J.J. overhears Haley on her phone telling someone "Don't worry. I won't say anything to Dr. Johnson." Kayla eventually agrees to let Haley keep her job if she gets counseling from Marlena. If Haley refuses to get counseling from Marlena Kayla will fire her. Haley is revealed to be daughter of Melinda Trask. It is later revealed that she tried to take her life because she is an illegal immigrant in Salem.

During the Days "time jump" it was revealed that Haley died from falling down a flight of stairs when she was accidentally pushed by Kristen DiMera.

== Charlotte DiMera ==
Charlotte DiMera
- Days of Our Lives character
- Portrayed by: Matilda Hanna and Chloe Teperman (2018–2019); Olivia and Oakley Rondou (2019–2020); Autumn Gendron (2021–2026); Pippa Blaylock (since 2026)
- Duration: 2018–present
- First appearance: November 12, 2018
- Created by: Ron Carlivati
- Introduced by: Ken Corday, Albert Alarr and Greg Meng; Ken Corday and Noel Maxam (2026)
In-universe information
- Parents: Chad DiMera; Abigail Deveraux
- Brothers: Thomas DiMera
- Grandparents: Stefano DiMera; Madeline Peterson-Woods; Charles Woods (step) Jack Deveraux; Jennifer Horton

Charlotte DiMera is the daughter of Chad DiMera and Abigail Deveraux. Charlotte is conceived during Abigail's experience of Dissociative identity disorder, leaving Abigail unsure if the father is her husband Chad or his brother Stefan DiMera, with whom her alter "Gabby" had an affair. Chad is the father, but Gabi Hernandez alters the results of a paternity test to make it seem that Stefan is the father as an act of revenge against "Gabby" and Stefan for framing her for murder. Chad and Abigail separate, but reconcile after the truth is revealed. Jordan Ridgeway kidnaps the infant Charlotte to frame her brother Ben Weston, who was previously obsessed with Abigail, because Jordan believes Ben needs to be institutionalized. Jordan sets a fire, but Ben and Chad track her down in time to rescue Charlotte. Chad takes a job in Paris and relocates his family there, but they later return to Salem. Charlotte departed the soap in February 2026 and returned two months later. In August of the same year, Gendron exited the role. Pippa Blaylock was recast in the role and scenes concerning her debut occurring on August 25.

== Li Shin ==
Li Shin
- Days of Our Lives character
- Portrayed by: Remington Hoffman
- Duration: 2019–2024
- First appearance: October 31, 2019
- Last appearance: September 23, 2024
- Created by: Ron Carlivati
- Introduced by: Ken Corday, Albert Alarr and Greg Meng
- Spin-off appearances: Chad and Abby in Paris (2019); Days of Our Lives: Beyond Salem (2021)
In-universe information
- Occupation: Businessman
- Family: Shin
- Father: Wei Shin
- Mother: Mrs. Shin
- Sisters: Wendy Shin
- Wife: Gabi Hernandez (2022–2023)
- Uncles: Li Jun

Li Shin is a member of the DiMera Board of Trustees as well as the son of the Chairman, Wei Shin.

First appearing in Chad and Abby in Paris, Li was the newest member of the board and became involved with Chad being framed for assault. Eventually, Chad proved his innocence and the board fired the person responsible.

He would appear often in Salem when it came to replacing CEOs or speaking for the board during shareholder meetings. He also became an ally of Gabi Hernandez and would help her maintain her position within DiMera Enterprises and would also help Jake DiMera become CEO after Chad proved to be ineffective. However, when Jake was removed, he managed to keep his job when EJ DiMera successfully stage a coup. Over time, he became closer to Gabi after she and Jake broke up.

After Dr. Rolf was released from prison, Li paid him a visit and reminded him that he provided the means to keep Stefan DiMera alive. Not wanting to lose Gabi to Stefan, he asked Rolf to slow his recovery so that Gabi can become fully devoted to him. Still, Stefan recovered and he and Gabi reunited despite the fact that her and Li being married. He still becomes obsessed with Gabi and is determined to get rid of Stefan, going as far as to team up with Megan Hathaway to have him murdered by a brainwashed Harris Michaels. He covers his tracks, but Gabi figures out that he was involved. After getting him to confess on tape, she and Stefan blackmail him into signing his shares of DiMera over to him. Later that night, Stefan finds Gabi over Li with a knife that she pulled out of his back. He pronounced dead at the hospital and Gabi is charged with murder in August 2023.

It is later revealed that a former blind date, Connie Viniski, killed Li in a fit a rage after he turned her down for another date. He would subsequently appear to Connie as a hallucinations both professing his disdain for her plans and his love for her.

== See also ==
- List of Days of Our Lives characters
- List of Days of Our Lives characters (1960s)
- List of Days of Our Lives characters (1970s)
- List of Days of Our Lives characters (1980s)
- List of Days of Our Lives characters (1990s)
- List of Days of Our Lives characters (2000s)
- List of Days of Our Lives characters (2020s)
- List of Days of Our Lives cast members
- List of previous Days of Our Lives cast members
