= Kyler Pettis =

American actor

- Born: Kyler Mackenzie Pettis; October 16, 1992 (age 33); Laguna Hills, California, United States
- Education: Saddleback College
- Occupation: Actor
- Years active: 2014–present
- Height: 1.80 m (5 ft 11 in)
- Parents: Gary Pettis (father); Peggy Pettis (mother)
- Relatives: Dante Pettis (brother); Paige Pettis (sister); Austin Pettis (cousin)

Kyler Mackenzie Pettis (born October 16, 1992) is an American actor. In 2015, he was cast in the SORASed Theo Carver on the NBC soap opera, Days of Our Lives, a role he remained in until 2018. In 2019, he won the Daytime Emmy Award for Outstanding Younger Actor in a Drama Series.

== Early life ==
Pettis was born in Laguna Hills, California to ex National Football League cheerleader Peggy and former Major League Baseball player Gary Pettis. He has 3 siblings Paige, Shaye and Dante. Dante plays professional football for the Chicago Bears. Kyler studied at JSerra Catholic High School in 2011, and graduated from Saddleback College in 2013.

== Career ==
Pettis was signed with Otto Models. In August 2015, Pettis took over the role from Terrell Ransom, Jr as the autistic son of Abe and Lexie Carver on Days of Our Lives. He debuted as Theo Carver on November 3, 2015. The casting call described the character as a "16-year-old, gorgeous, African American male" who is a High-functioning autistic (HFA). In August 2016, Pettis booked a role in the movie "M.F.A." as a character named Conor. The film is directed by Natalia Leite and written by Leah McKendrick.

== Filmography ==
Year	Title	Role	Notes
2014	Old Dogs & New Tricks	Powerhouse Patron	Episode: "WeHo Horror Story"
2014	Secret's Out	Jake	Short film
2015	Ray Donovan	Dylan	Episode: "Breakfast of Champions"
2015-2018	Days of Our Lives	Theo Carver	Series regular: 124 episodes (November 3, 2015 to January 18, 2018)
2016	Loosely Exactly Nicole	N/A	Episode: "Brother Visits"
2017	M.F.A.	Conor	film

== Awards and nominations ==
Year	Award	Category	Work	Result	Ref.
2019	Daytime Emmy Award	Outstanding Younger Actor in a Drama Series	Days of Our Lives	Won	
