= Lexie Carver =

- Days of Our Lives character
- Nikki Crawford as Lexie Carver
- Portrayed by: Cyndi James Gossett (1987–1989); Angelique Francis (1989–1992); Shellye Broughton (1993); Renée Jones (1993–2012); Jennifer Lee (2021); Nikki Crawford (2026)
- Duration: 1987–1990; 1992–2012; 2021; 2024; 2026
- First appearance: July 30, 1987
- Last appearance: August 21, 2026
- Created by: Leah Laiman
- Introduced by: Betty Corday, Ken Corday, and Al Rabin (1987); Ken Corday and Al Rabin (1992); Ken Corday and Tom Langan (1993); Ken Corday and Albert Alarr (2021, 2024); Ken Corday and Noel Maxam (2026)
- Renée Jones as Lexie Carver
In-universe information
- Other names: Alexandra Brooks; Alexandra DiMera
- Occupation: Doctor; Police officer
- Parents: Stefano DiMera; Celeste Perrault
- Adoptive parents: Grace Brooks
- Siblings: André DiMera; Renée DuMonde; Megan DiMera; Kristen DiMera (adoptive); Peter Blake (adoptive); Benjy Hawk; EJ DiMera; Chad DiMera; Tony DiMera (legal); Cameron Davis; Stefan DiMera; Jake Lambert
- Spouse: Abe Carver (1991–2012)
- Children: Theo Carver
- Stepchildren: Brandon Walker; Lani Price
- Grandparents: Santo DiMera
- Nieces and nephews: Dimitri Von Leuschner; Steven Hawk; Johnny DiMera; Thomas DiMera; Sydney DiMera; Grace Brady; Charlotte DiMera; Rachel Black (adoptive)

Lexie Carver is a fictional character on the soap opera, Days of Our Lives, created by head writer Leah Laiman. The role has been played most notably by actress Renée Jones, who appeared in the role from 1993 until departing in 2012. Nikki Crawford assumed the role of Lexie when the character returned for a six-month storyline in 2026. She is the daughter of crime boss Stefano DiMera, and the psychic Celeste Perrault. She is the mother of Theo Carver, and was the wife of mayor Abe Carver.

== Casting ==
The role was originated on July 30, 1987, by Cyndi James Gossett on a recurring basis. Gossett last appeared as Lexie on February 20, 1989. Angelique deWindt Francis portrayed the character from March 31, 1989, until August 2, 1990, and again from March 9 to December 12, 1992. Shellye Broughton appeared for two episodes on January 28 and 29, 1993, with Renée Jones taking over on February 2, 1993. Jones remained a regular until she was dropped to recurring status in 2007.

In April 2012, Jones confirmed in an interview with TV Guide's Michael Logan that she would vacate the role of Lexie Carver after 20 years and would retire into a simpler life, revealing that she is not happy in acting. Jones revealed that the exit of Lexie would likely be a permanent one. Jones last aired on June 28, 2012. On October 22, 2021, Jennifer Lee stepped into the role for a special episode focusing on Abe.

In March 2026, it was announced Nikki Crawford had been recast in the role. She made her first appearance during the final moments of the March 6 episode. Crawford exited during the August 21, 2026, episode.

== Storylines ==
Lexie is the wife of Salem mayor Abe Carver. She is the daughter of international criminal, Stefano DiMera, and Celeste Perrault, however she is raised to believe that her aunt Grace and Grace's husband are her biological parents.

Lexie Brooks arrives in Salem in July 1987 as a police Officer and partner of Officer Abe Carver, but is subsequently kicked off the force for aiding her vigilante brother-in-law Jonah Carver. Lexie also becomes good friends with Diana Colville, the fiancée of John Black (who was then believed to be Roman Brady). Later in 1994, she goes through medical school and becomes a doctor. Abe and Lexie are married off-screen in 1991 when they elope. In September 1992, Lexie is believed to be pregnant, but it is revealed that the test was a false positive, devastating the couple.

Lexie has a history of cheating on her husband. She flirts with Abe's brother Jonah in the Summer of 1994, but they stop short of an affair. In 2001, Lexie sleeps with Abe's illegitimate son Brandon Walker before she knows of his connection to her husband. In 2005, Lexie has an affair with Tek Kramer, whom she dates after her husband is presumed dead.

Lexie, while not a villain, frequently engages in unethical behavior. She also tends to stick up for her father's family, the DiMeras. Both her father Stefano and her half-brother André DiMera have helped her with her problems (often using illegal means). Fearing Lexie can't bear children, Stefano arranges for her to raise Isaac (Zack), the son of Bo Brady and Hope Brady, as her biological son after a surrogate's baby is switched with Zack in the hospital. Lexie did not know this at the time, but later chooses to keep quiet about it once she finds out, even though Hope is her best friend. In 2003, Lexie gives birth to Theo Carver, her son with Abe. However, the family's happiness is short-lived when Abe is seemingly murdered by the Salem Stalker on the same day Theo is to be christened. However, it is revealed that Abe is alive and is trapped on Melaswen ("New Salem" backwards) Island, part of a plot conducted by André. Abe and Lexie reunite when he returns to Salem in 2004.

Lexie has a history of antagonism with Sami Brady. They were both involved with Brandon, and Sami blackmails Lexie on a number of occasions due to Lexie's repeated adultery. Later, Sami has Lexie lie to Sami's sister, Carrie Brady, regarding her chances of having healthy children. Breaking her Hippocratic oath, Lexie is fired from Salem University Hospital. However, with Hope's help, Lexie becomes Kayla Brady's part-time private nurse and 'personal medical adviser'.

In 2007, Lexie is kidnapped by André because she claims she witnessed her half-brother EJ DiMera shooting John Black. Tek Kramer is the real witness of the crime, but they cover it up because Lexie did not want her husband to find out that she is with Tek again. Shortly afterwards, Lexie and Tek are run off the road. No bodies are recovered. Lexie is later discovered in the tunnels of Salem during a Bo and Hope investigation into the long running Brady-DiMera feud.

Upon her return, Lexie reunites with her husband and is reinstated by the Salem University Hospital board and eventually becomes Chief of Staff. Her new position keeps her very busy which causes marital problems. She deals with the news that Theo is autistic. In order to spend more time with her son, Lexie resigns from her position, but remains at the hospital as a doctor. She also supports Abe's campaign for mayor. In November 2008, Lexie becomes Salem's First Lady. Lexie later returns to the position of Chief of Staff after Kayla, who took over the role, decides to leave Salem.

In 2010, it is believed that Dr. Carly Manning would take on the position of Chief of Staff when Lexie and Abe consider leaving Salem. However, when they decide to stay, Lexie decides to keep her position at the hospital.

In 2012, Lexie's mother Celeste returns to town with Lexie's brother, Cameron Davis. Before her arrival, Lexie suffers from headaches and begins to feel weak and faint. After initial tests run by Daniel Jonas, it's discovered she has brain tumors - as a result of being held captive in the toxic fume-filled tunnels under the DiMera mansion when André had kidnapped her a few years prior. Following further tests, it's discovered that the tumors have grown and are fatal, giving her a matter of weeks to live. Her family gathers around her, helping her with her bucket list, which includes going to Paris. Unable to fly, Abe, with the help of EJ and Cameron, turn the Horton Town Square into a Paris-like setting. In late June, a fragile Lexie goes on a picnic in the backyard with Abe, where she peacefully passes away in his arms. A ghostly Lexie visits her loved ones and assures Theo that while she may not always be there in her physical presence, she will always be there for him.

In 2021 and 2024, Lexie visits Abe and comforts him.

In 2025, it is shown that Rolf and EJ have a mysterious patient in a glowing pod that they are seeking to revive. In 2026, it is revealed that Lexie is the patient.

== Reception ==
In 2020, Candace Young and Charlie Mason from Soaps She Knows put Lexie on their list of Daytime's Most Important African-American Characters, commenting that "We all thought that Renee Jones' good doctor was the Rx for a nice, simple, happy life for our beloved Abe — until we along with she discovered that for decades, she should've been sending Father's Day cards to Stefano DiMera, aka the biggest Big Bad soapdom's ever known."
