= Victoria Konefal =

American actress (born 1996)

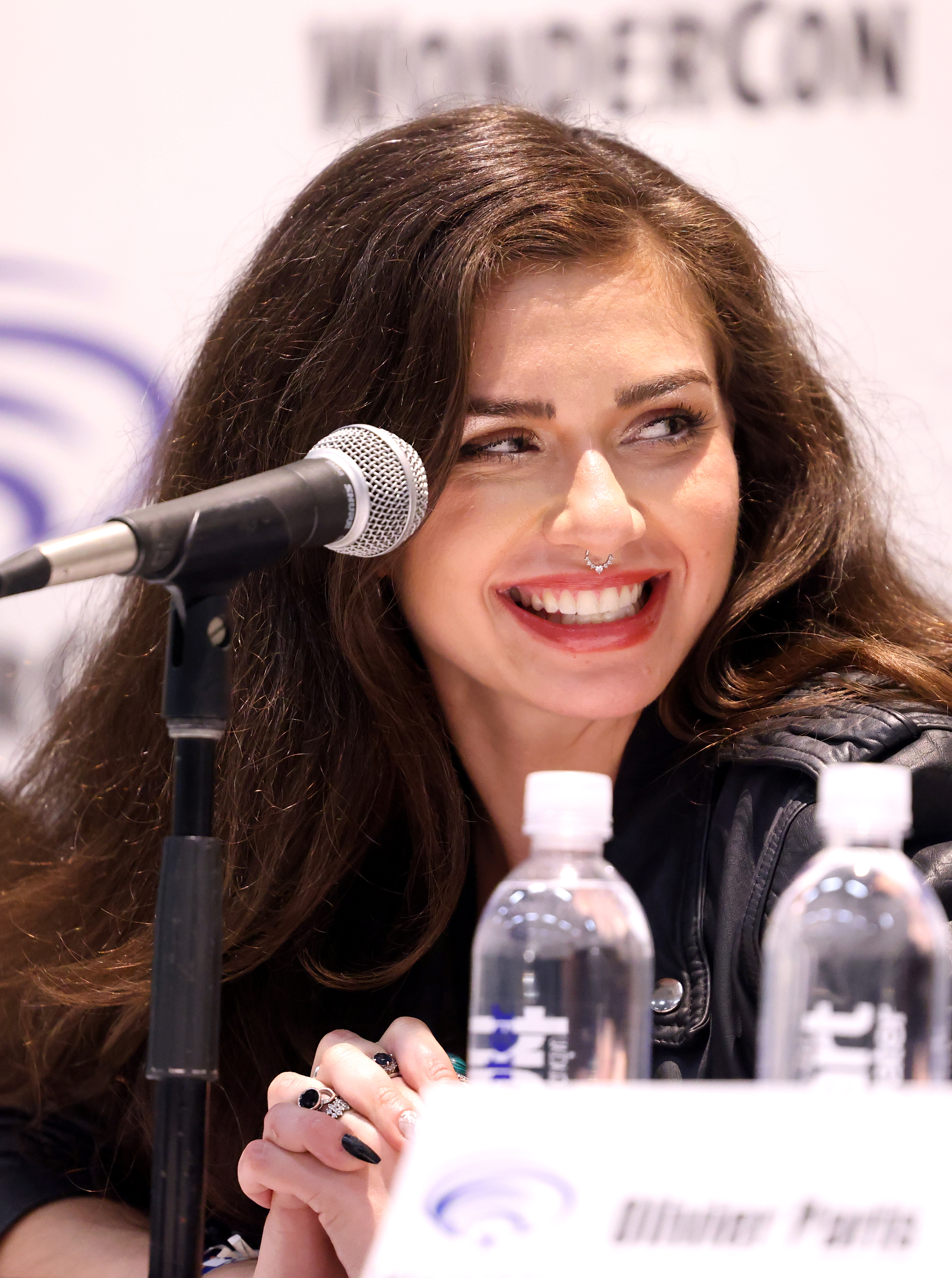
- Konefal in 2026
- Born: Brooklyn, New York, U.S.
- Occupation: Actress
- Years active: 2016–present

Victoria Konefal is an American actress. She has portrayed Ciara Brady on the NBC soap opera Days of Our Lives since 2017.

== Early life ==
Konefal was born in Brooklyn, New York and grew up in Kensington, Brooklyn. Her family consists of her parents, an older brother and sister, Victoria is the youngest. She studied at Fiorello H. LaGuardia High School. She was a beauty pageant contestant, crowned Miss Polonia USA 2015.

== Career ==
Konefal is signed with MN2S International Music & Talent Agency and Katz PR, previously she was signed with Talent Works and Bold Management & Production. Konefal started her acting career in 2015 by landing a lead role in two films Forgetting Sandy Glass as Kelly, and the horror film Fog City as Georgia Paige. In 2016, she guest-starred in an episode of Modern Family as Rivka. In 2017, she appeared in three films: The Wrong Crush, where she played the lead role of Amelia; horror film Circus Kane as Tracy; and Deadly Exchange as Blake. In August 2017, it was announced that she had been cast in the role of Ciara Brady on the NBC soap opera, Days of Our Lives. She debuted on December 1, 2017.

In 2023, Konefal starred as Georgia Paige in the horror thriller movie Fog City.

== Filmography ==
Television and film roles
Year	Title	Role	Notes
2016	Forgetting Sandy Glass	Kelly	Film
2016	Modern Family	Rivka	Episode: "Blindsided"
2017	The Wrong Crush	Amelia	Television film
2017	Deadly Exchange	Blake	Television film
2017–present	Days of Our Lives	Ciara Brady	Series regular
2017	Circus Kane	Tracy	Film
2021-2022	Days of Our Lives: Beyond Salem	Ciara Brady	Miniseries
2023	Fog City	Georgia Paige	
2024	Scared to Death	Lena	

== Awards and nominations ==
Year	Award	Category	Work	Result	Ref.
2019	Daytime Emmy Award	Outstanding Younger Actress in a Drama Series	Days of Our Lives	Nominated	
2020	Soap Hub Awards	Favorite Days of Our Lives Actress	Days of Our Lives	Won	
2021	Daytime Emmy Award	Outstanding Younger Performer in a Drama Series	Days of Our Lives	Won	
2021	Soap Hub Awards	Favorite Days of Our Lives Actress	Days of Our Lives	Won	
