= Terrell Ransom Jr. =

American actor (born 2003)

- Born: Terrell Louis Ransom Jr. July 5, 2003 (age 23); Royal Oak, Michigan, U.S.
- Other name: Kid Prodigy
- Occupations: Actor, model
- Years active: 2007–present

Terrell Louis Ransom Jr. (born July 5, 2003), also known as Kid Prodigy, is an American actor. He is mostly known for his roles on The Amazing World of Gumball as Darwin Watterson and A Girl Named Jo as Dwight Hughes.

== Early life ==
Ransom was born Terrell Louis Ransom Jr. on July 5, 2003 in Royal Oak, Michigan, as the son of Terrell Louis Sr. and Katrina Ransom. Ransom showed an interest in acting and modeling very early on from watching the Disney Channel series Hannah Montana as a child. He then enrolled in acting classes where teachers were reluctant to work with him because of his young age. Katrina later relocated to California to facilitate her son's career.

== Career ==
Since moving to California in late 2007, Ransom has been working consistently. He has appeared in numerous commercials including ads for Kmart, Quilted Northern, Old Navy, Elmers Glue, McDonald's and SpongeBob SpongeSoap. For seven years he had a recurring role on Days of Our Lives and made guest appearances on several shows including ABC's The Middle and Detroit 1-8-7, CBS's CSI:NY and NBC's The Jay Leno Show. He has also appeared in a few movies including the 2011 flick The Chicago 8 and 2012 Lifetime movie Murder on the 13th Floor. From season three to the eleventh episode of season five in Cartoon Network's The Amazing World of Gumball, Ransom provided the voice of Darwin Watterson after Kwesi Boakye (who voiced Darwin for the first three seasons) hit puberty. He was succeeded by Donielle T. Hansley Jr. for the same reason.

== Personal life ==
Ransom has been a celebrity ambassador of The Jonathan Foundation, an organization that provides assistance in the special education system in Northridge, California since 2015.

== Filmography ==
Year	Title	Role	Notes
2008–15	Days of Our Lives	Theo Carver	Soap opera, 100+ episodes
2009	Joe Buck Live	Little Leaguer	TV series; Episode #1.1
2009	The Jay Leno Show	Jay Leno Son	TV series; Jay & Kevin Plus 11 skit
2009	The Middle	Spencer Henderson	Episode #1.5; The Block Party
2009	The Scarecrow & the Princess	Trick or Treater	Short film
2010	Funny or Die Presents	Africa/Biker's kid	2 episodes; skits Playground Politics and Designated Driver
2010	Childrens Hospital	Patient	Episode #2.7
2010	Detroit 1-8-7	Kevin Jackson	Episode #1.4; Royal Bubbles/Needle Drop
2010	Ni Hao, Kai-Lan	Xin Xin	Episode: Princess Kai-Lan
2010	The 41-Year-Old Virgin Who Knocked Up Sarah Marshall and Felt Superbad About It	Blaqguy (age 6)	Feature film
2010	Courage	Justin Porter	Lead role; Short film
2011	The Middle	Kid	Episode #2.18; Spring Cleaning
2011	General Hospital	Boy (voiceover)	Soap opera, 2 episodes
2011	Girl in Tank	Jimmy	Short film
2011–12	Pretty the Series	Nay-J Mink	Web series, 4 episodes
2012	Murder on the 13th Floor	Cody Braxton	Lead role; Lifetime Movie
2012	The Chicago 8	Malik Seale	Supporting role
2012	CSI: NY	Lonnie James	Episode #9.04; Unspoken
2012	CSI: Crime Scene Investigation	Eli Brewster	Episode #13.07; Fallen Angels
2013	12 Years a Slave	Kid (voiceover)	Feature film, uncredited
2013	The Best Man Holiday	Kid (voiceover)	Feature film
2014–17	The Amazing World of Gumball	Darwin Watterson (voice)	Main role; season 3–mid season 5; 91 episodes
2015	The Whispers	Ethan	Guest star; two episodes
2016	Finding Dory	Additional voices	Feature film
2017	A Chance in the World	Steve	Movie; based on true story
2019	A Girl Named Jo	Dwight Hughes	Main role (seasons 2–3)
2019	Same Time, Next Christmas	Jeff	TV movie
2023	Days of Our Lives	Jerry Prentiss	soap opera
2023	Body and Soul	Jerry Prentiss as Randy Jones	a soap within a soap on Days of Our Lives
