= Dena Higley =

American screenwriter

Dena Higley (born September 26, 1958) is an American writer, speaker and author.

== Early life and career ==
Higley grew up in East County, San Diego and was the first of three children. She moved to Los Angeles as a teenager eventually graduating from the University of Southern California with a BFA in Theatre. Dena was previously the head writer of the daytime soap operas Days of Our Lives and One Life to Live. In February 2015, Soap Opera Digest confirmed Higley's imminent return to Days of Our Lives, this time alongside Josh Griffith. The pair begin writing for the series on February 16, 2015, with their material airing on August 19, 2015. Higley was fired again in January 2017; she was replaced by Ron Carlivati. Higley, formerly a member of Writers Guild of America West, left and maintained financial core status during the 2007–08 Writers Guild of America strike.

== Positions held ==
Days of Our Lives

- Head Writer: March 7, 2003 - August 8, 2003; April 23, 2008 – August 25, 2011
- Co-Head Writer: August 11, 2003 - August 18, 2003; August 19, 2015 - July 18, 2017)
- Script writer: September 19, 2003 - November 26, 2004
- Associate Head Writer: September 16, 1985 - January 24, 1986; October 20, 1986 – March 6, 2003; August 19, 2003 - October 24, 2003

One Life to Live

- Head Writer: December 13, 2004 - September 10, 2007

== Personal life ==
Dena has been married for 25 years to Mark and is a mother of four children, including an autistic son Connor, a daughter Jensen, an adopted daughter with physical disability, from Vietnam Adelle, and an adopted son Helio, from Ethiopia. Her current non-fiction book Momaholic: Crazy Confessions of a Helicopter Parent was released April 14, 2012.

== Awards and nominations ==
Daytime Emmy Award

- Nominations: 1987, 1994, 1997–1999, and 2006, Best Writing, Days of our Lives
- Wins: 2008, Best Writing, One Life to Live

Writers Guild of America Award

- Nominations: 1987, 1991, 1993, 2001, and 2005, Days of our Lives
- Wins: 1999, Days of our Lives
