= Vivian Jovanni =

American actress and former model (born 1995)

- Born: Vivian Pupo; August 17, 1995 (age 30); Houston, Texas, U.S.
- Occupation: Actress
- Years active: 2014–present
- Height: 1.70 m (5 ft 7 in)

Vivian Jovanni (born August 17, 1995) is an American former actress and former model. She is known for portraying the role of Ciara Brady on the NBC soap opera, Days of Our Lives.

== Early life ==
Jovanni was born in Houston, Texas to Laura and Edward Pupo, Cuban immigrants of Spanish and Italian descent. She has two brothers, Daniel and Christian, who is her twin.

== Career ==
Jovanni is managed by Dreamscope Entertainment. Before moving to Los Angeles to pursue her acting career, she worked as a model, and in 2013 was named Female Fitness Model of the Year by International Modeling and Talent Association. In 2014, she made her acting debut when she landed the guest-starring role in the series The Bay.

In April 2015, Days of Our Lives sent out a casting call for the role of Ciara Brady using the code name Danielle, describing the character as a 16-17 year old girl who has experienced a lot of pain in her life. In October 2015, it was announced that Jovanni had won the role, which had been previously played by child actress Lauren Boles. Jovanni made her on-screen debut on October 30, 2015. three-months later, in January 2016, she was pre-nominated in the 43rd Daytime Emmy Awards for her work on the show. In December 2016, Serial Scoop announced Jovanni was leaving the soap, by way of a "mutual decision" between her and the soap.

== Filmography ==
Film
Year	Title	Role	Notes
2015	The Right Hand of God	Magnolia	Short film
2018	The Madness Within	Lariana	

Television
Year	Title	Role	Notes
2014	The Bay	Orchid girl	1 episode
2015–2017	Days of Our Lives	Ciara Brady	Main role
