= Hope Williams Brady =

- Days of Our Lives character
- Kristian Alfonso as Hope Williams Brady
- Portrayed by: Kristina Osterhout (1974); Kimberly Weber (1974–1975); Natasha Ryan (1975–1980); Tammy Taylor (1981–1982); Kristian Alfonso (1983–present); Mila Kunis (1994)
- Duration: 1974–1987; 1990; 1994–2020; 2022–present
- First appearance: January 10, 1974
- Created by: William J. Bell
- Introduced by: Betty Corday
- Spin-off appearances: Days of Our Lives: Beyond Salem (2022)
- Crossover appearances: Friends (2000)
In-universe information
- Other names: Hope Alice Williams; Hope Hernandez; Princess Gina Von Amberg
- Occupation: Commissioner; Detective; Police officer; Bounty hunter; Private investigator; Model
- Family: Horton
- Father: Doug Williams
- Mother: Addie Horton
- Half-brothers: Steven Olson; Douglas LeClaire
- Half-sisters: Julie Olson Williams
- Spouse: Larry Welch (1984–1985); Bo Brady (1985–1995, 2000–2012, 2013–2014) (Note: Despite the 2012 retcon of John and Hope's marriage, Bo and Hope were married in 2000.); John Black (1999–2012); Aiden Jennings (2015–2016); Rafe Hernandez (2018–2019); Harris Michaels (2022)
- Children: Shawn-Douglas Brady; Zack Brady; Ciara Brady
- Stepdaughters: Chelsea Brady
- Grandchildren: Claire Brady; Bo Weston; Addie Weston
- Grandparents: Tom Horton; Alice Horton
- Aunts and uncles: Byron Carmichael; Tom Horton Jr. Mickey Horton; Bill Horton; Marie Horton
- Nephews: Spencer Olson; David Banning; Robert Anderson, Jr. Doug Williams III
- First cousins: Sandy Horton; Melissa Horton (adoptive); Sarah Horton (legal); Mike Horton; Jennifer Horton; Lucas Horton; Jessica Blake Fallon

Hope Williams Brady is a fictional character from Days of Our Lives, an American soap opera on the NBC network. Created by writer William J. Bell, she was portrayed by Kristian Alfonso on and off from April 1983 to the present day, most recently appearing in December 2024. Hope is a member of the Horton family, the long-running core fictional family on Days. She is the mother of Shawn-Douglas Brady, Zack Brady, and Ciara Brady. Hope is one half of the supercouple Bo & Hope. She works as a cop for the Salem P.D. Hope was promoted to Commissioner of Salem P.D. in 2017.

Alfonso was nominated for a Daytime Emmy Award for Outstanding Younger Actress in a Drama Series (previously called Outstanding Ingenue) in 1985. She has also been nominated for eight Soap Opera Digest Awards and won four — two with co-star Peter Reckell (Bo Brady) for Favorite Couple (2001, 2003), Hottest Female Star (1999) and Favorite Newcomer (1984). She was also nominated for three Young Artist Awards (1984–86). In 2002, she and Reckell won a Special Fan Award (voted online) at the Daytime Emmys for Favorite Couple.

== Casting ==
The character of Hope Williams was originated by child actor Kristina Osterhout from January 10 to August 27, 1974. Child actor Kimberly Weber took over the role from October 25, 1974, to April 29, 1975. Natasha Ryan was the child actor who played the young version of Hope the longest from June 4, 1975, through June 27, 1980. From May 11, 1981, until January 8, 1982, young adult actress Tammy Taylor played a teenaged Hope. Actress Kristian Alfonso assumed the role of Hope Williams on April 14, 1983, playing the role through April 20, 1987, reappearing from April 27 to August 3, 1990. She returned to the role on May 6, 1994. Alfonso's Hope appeared briefly as a patient of Drake Ramoray in season 6 episode 15 of the sitcom Friends (The One That Could Have Been, Part 1) on February 17, 2000.

In July 2020, Alfonso announced to Deadline Hollywood she would exit the role. In a statement, she said: "I feel blessed and honored to have been invited into people's homes for over three decades. However, it is now time for me to write my next chapter." In an interview with Entertainment Tonight, she discussed her exit and potential of a return, stating: "It's been a rollercoaster of emotions and I have no regrets. I don't plan on returning and popping in as others have done in the past. I think that chapter is closed and a new one needs to be started." Alfonso further disclosed that executive producers Ken Corday and Albert Alarr suggested that she take a four-to-five month break for storyline purposes, which also prompted her decision to exit. She exited the role during the October 14 episode.

In April 2022, it was announced Alfonso would reprise the role for the second chapter of Days of Our Lives: Beyond Salem, which was released on Peacock on July 11. In November of the same year, it was announced she would return to Days of Our Lives, returning during the March 17, 2023, episode.

In April 2024, it was announced Alfonso would reprise the role in connection to the real-life passing of Bill Hayes, as well as the soap's 15,000th episode celebration. She returned on November 29.

== Storylines ==
Hope Alice Williams, the mother of Shawn-Douglas, Zack and Ciara Brady, was introduced on January 10, 1974, to Doug Williams and Addie Horton. Not long after Addie marries Doug and becomes pregnant, she discovers she is suffering from leukemia, but declines treatment in order to save her unborn baby. Later that year while crossing the street, an oncoming car careens towards Hope and Addie, but Addie pushes Hope's baby-carriage out of the way, just in time to save her baby daughter, but not herself. Addie dies, and Hope is taken in by her maternal grandparents, Tom and Alice Horton, until Doug is strong enough to take care of her. Addie, who was wealthy from her first marriage to Ben Olson, leaves Doug and Hope with financial security. Hope is sent off to boarding school in 1982 and is not seen again until a year later. She returns in the spring of 1983 when Roman Brady rescues her after she runs away from boarding school and later falls from a car driven by a drunk friend. She later develops a crush on Roman. Roman spurns Hope's advances, even after Hope attempts to seduce him, and the situation inflames the jealousy of Roman's younger brother, local bad boy Bo Brady. Bo and Hope start to fall in love while working together in various dangerous situations. On Hope's 18th birthday, she and Bo decide to have sex but Doug tries to stop them and suffers a heart attack, and Hope agrees never to see Bo again. Bo hides the fact that his brother Roman is alive, and to protect Hope, pushes her away. Hope spends time with Larry Welch, (a local politician) and thinking that Bo loves Megan Hathaway and no longer loves her, Hope agrees to marry Larry. As Hope and Larry stand at the altar, Bo rides into the church on his motorbike and kidnaps Hope before the wedding can be completed. However, Hope is then kidnapped again, this time from the barn where Bo has taken her, and the kidnappers force her to marry Larry. Bo is devastated, but later discovers the true reason Hope married Larry; the two vow never to be apart, and to work together to find out who is behind Larry.

Larry takes the fall for Salem's drug ring, leaving Bo and Hope free to finally marry in 1985. During this time, it is revealed that Bo's real father is Victor Kiriakis. The couple move into Victor's home but they soon experience marital problems, and Hope disapproves of Bo's sudden change of character to please his father. Hope becomes pregnant, but miscarries her child. They try again and have a son, Shawn-Douglas, in 1987. Bo, Hope, and Shawn leave Salem later that year, and sail the world on their boat, Fancy Face.

They return to Salem in 1990, but soon after, Hope is embroiled in the schemes of the villainous Ernesto Toscano, who kidnaps Hope and holds her hostage in a cave. When the cave explodes, Hope is presumed dead. Four years later, Bo begins a new relationship with Billie Reed, who later proposes to him, but their plans are shattered after John Black finds an amnesiac woman at Stefano DiMera's house, "Maison Blache", who looks exactly like Hope. The woman calls herself "Gina", but after Alice finds a puzzle box that only Hope could open, they learn that "Gina" is truly Hope. Bo later breaks up with Billie, and reconciles with Hope but just before they are to remarry, Hope catches Bo in a compromising position with Billie, and rejects Bo. She then moves in with Franco Kelly.

It is revealed that during Hope's four years of captivity at Maison Blanche, Stefano had the memories of the real Princess Gina Von Amberg, an accomplished art thief, saved on a chip and then installed in Hope's head. Stefano, who is seeking to retrieve his art treasures from Vivian Alamain, turns Hope back into Gina to help him. He gets Hope to kidnap John, and they have sex on Stefano's yacht. When Stefano finds them, he ditches John and has sex with Hope himself. Hope and Stefano then travel to Paris where they are held prisoner by the real Gina as she tries to reclaim her life. They are finally rescued and Hope finds herself pregnant. Hope wishes that the baby is Bo's but doesn't believe it's possible, so she comes to believe that the baby is John's.

Hope gives birth to her and Bo's second child, Zack, in 2000, but the babies are switched by Stefano, and Hope believes her son is J.T Reiber. The switch is later revealed, and they get Zack back. In 2002, Larry Welch returns and he and Billie scheme to kidnap and kill Hope. Hope is rescued, and Larry and Billie are caught; Billie is pardoned and asked to leave Salem but Larry is eventually murdered in January 2003.

In 2003, Salem is rocked by a rash of apparent serial killings known as the Salem Stalker Murders, in which many close to Hope disappear and are presumed dead. Hope pursues the prime suspect, Patrick Lockhart, tracking him to Melaswen Island, where the two have an affair, and Hope discovers that all the missing victims are being held, alive. Bo tracks Hope to the island and they are reunited, but the situation is complicated by the fact that the group that disappeared includes Bo's old flame Billie. Bo and Bille also learn that their daughter is actually alive, and is Chelsea Brady.

On New Year's Eve 2006, Bo and Hope's younger son, Zack, is killed in a hit-and-run accident and the killer is revealed to be Chelsea. Bo learns that Chelsea was driving the car that hit Zack, but he agrees to keep it a secret from everyone, including Hope, so his daughter doesn't go to jail. When Hope finds out, she kicks Bo out of the house and asks for a divorce by email. Meddling Chelsea responds to the email, pretending to be Bo, and agrees to the divorce. Hope is devastated and begins a relationship with Patrick.

Hope learns she is pregnant and thinks the father is Patrick, but she learns that Patrick had paid the doctor to change the DNA tests and that Bo is actually the father. The two again reconcile. In 2008, Bo and Hope travel to Ireland to meet Colleen Brady after revealing the Brady-DiMera feud, but the group is involved in a plane crash; Shawn Brady is killed and everyone else is injured. Bo is briefly diagnosed with mystery illness affecting his pancreas, he requires a partial pancreas transplant and makes a full recovery. Bo and Hope's daughter, Ciara Brady is kidnapped in the summer of 2009 and Hope struggles with her memories of losing their son, Zack. She moves out of their house, taking Ciara with her and Bo is devastated.

Bo's old flame Carly Manning comes back to Salem and pursues Bo, driving a new wedge between Bo and Hope. Because of her separation from Bo and his relationship with Carly, Hope is unable to sleep and takes prescribed medication, but she suffers bizarre side-effects that cause her to assume an alter-ego who mugs men on the street. Hope is caught and sent to jail shortly after this. During her prison time, she uncovers an illegal organ ring and Bo rescues her from prison. Whilst on the run, the two realize their relationship is far from over and Bo ends his relationship with Carly.

In 2011, Bo and Hope renew their love for each other. On November 11, 2011, while searching through Alice's effects, Hope and her cousin Jennifer Horton find a clock bearing the symbol of a phoenix, meaning Alice's secrets point to Stefano. During a conversation between Hope and Marlena on December 17, 2012, it is revealed that John and Hope's divorce was finalized. Bo and Hope's problems move to employment, mainly due to budget cuts at the Salem P.D., which meant that they are both asked to take a pay cut. Hope happily agrees, but Bo is very reluctant. after reassuring him that she will support his decision, Bo chooses to leave the police force. During this time, Bo's mother, Caroline Brady begins to show symptoms of Alzheimer's disease. His sister Kayla Brady locates a clinic in California that will accept Caroline as a patient for a trial treatment. Bo leaves town with Caroline and is reported to have returned to Salem a short while later, but is not seen on-screen.

Bo leaves Salem to work for the ISA and promises his family he will return, but after many months without hearing from him, Hope begin to doubt Bo is coming back. she meets lawyer Aiden Jennings in January 2014, and after receiving no word from Bo, heartbrokenly files for divorce. she and Aiden begin a relationship and the two fall madly in love, he asks her to marry him and she accepts, they marry in a ceremony coinciding with the town's bicentennial, on their wedding night, Aiden tries to strangle Hope; a deal he made with Stefano DiMera to kill Hope and clear Stefano's son, Chad DiMera's name after Chad is accused of being responsible for multiple murders around town, Aiden refused to do it until Stefano and Andre threatened to kill his son, Chase if he didn't kill Hope, Bo arrives at the last minute, his absence's reason being he was being held hostage for information in Mexico and Aiden is killed while the two are struggling when a gun Bo was holding goes off, Hope is surprised, yet happy, to see Bo, but is taken to the hospital to make sure she's all right, Hope is later devastated by the news that Bo is dying from an inoperable brain tumor after he confesses his dismal prognosis that he'd been keeping from her shortly after he arrived back in Salem. As they reminisce about their long epic romance, Bo passes away in Hope's arms.

Shortly before Bo died, he made a special request, he asked Rafe Hernandez (Hope's longtime work partner) to look after Hope, Rafe reluctantly agreed, after Bo's passing, Rafe kept his word and watched Hope from a distance; remaining her friend and her work partner. When Hope believed that Stefano had a hand in Bo's death, she confronted him which resulted in her shooting and killing him, in the Dimera living room. Hope and Rafe covered up the crime and dumped Stefano's body in an abandoned building set to be blown up. Rafe kicked the body, and they left the building. Andre was later to find the body before it got blown up. Shortly after, Rafe began to develop feelings for one Hope. But those feelings were pushed to the back burner when Chase raped Ciara. Hope was devastated as was Ciara. Hope tried her best to be there for her daughter. Unable to suppress his feelings any further, Rafe kissed Hope, and though Hope was reluctant, and wasn't sure she was ready for a relationship, Rafe assured her she was, and Hope gave in. They started dating. The relationship grew rocky soon after when Aiden turned up.

As it turned out, he had been replaced by a Dimera doppelgänger before the wedding. Aiden lied and told Hope he had been replaced right after he proposed to her. In reality, Aiden had agreed to kill Hope (only because Andre had threatened to kill Aiden's son Chase if Aiden didn't kill Hope). However Aiden decided at the last moment he couldn't do it. He wasn't a killer, and he loved Hope too much. Andre had had his men kidnap Aiden when Aiden had tried to leave, and held him prisoner while the doppelgänger went in and tried to kill Hope. It was the doppelgänger-not Aiden-whom Bo ended up killing, and who had really tried to kill Hope. Hope struggled with her feelings and eventually, Rafe and Hope decided to part ways. When it came out that Aiden had originally agreed to kill Hope on their wedding night, and had been switched out after they got married and not after he proposed to her like he had said, Hope dumped Aiden. Hope and Rafe reunited immediately after. The two declared their love for one another. Once again, Aiden came between the two and Hope was blackmailed (with her taped admission to murdering Stefano) into breaking it off with Rafe. After going back and forth, the extortion ended after Aiden finally realized what he was doing was wrong, and left town.

Upon Aiden's departure from Salem, Hope believed she was in the clear. But Andre released a copy of Hope's confession, which resulted in Hope being arrested for the murder of Stefano Dimera. Hope was sentenced to life in prison much to the dismay of many Salemites. Hope spent months in jail, before it was discovered that Stefano was actually "Alive and living in Athens". In reality, it was Shane Donovan in a Stefano mask, but only he and Steve Johnson know it. They did it to get Hope free. Hope was exonerated of all charges and released. Returning to her life, Hope has dealt with Ciara's rebellion, and getting her job back.

In November 2017, Rafe broke up with Hope because she wasn't ready yet to get married. She begged him not to break up with her, and to listen to her, but he couldn't be with someone who wasn't ready to marry him, so he made her give the ring back, and then had sex with Sami the very same night. The next morning, Hope found him in the park and told him she was willing to marry him. He married her on February 26 in a private ceremony at the cabin, promising to always be honest with Hope when in fact, he had never told her the truth about having sex with Sami. Claire, meanwhile, overheard Ciara and Trip talking about Rafe cheating (although Rafe had actually broken up with Hope) with Sami, and Claire announced to Hope in front of everyone at the reception that Rafe cheated. Hope slapped Rafe and ran off. She later told him she wanted an annulment, but eventually she forgave Rafe to hold off on the annulment, and eventually forgave Sami.

== Reception ==
In 2020, Charlie Mason from Soaps She Knows put Hope second place on a list of 35 most memorable characters from Days of Our Lives, commented "Kristian Alfonso's enduring heroine has suffered more heartbreaks than any three characters combined, been dropped in a vat of acid and turned into Princess freakin' Gina. So yeah, we still can't believe that she'll soon be gone for good". In 2024, Mason included Hope in his list of the best mothers in American soap operas, writing, "All the moms on our "best" list would tell you that they'd do anything for their kids. But Ciara and Shawn's mother is unique in that not only would the butt-kicking detective do anything for them, she actually could, too."
