= Shawn Brady and Belle Black =

Fictional couple from Days of Our Lives

- Days of our Lives character
- Brandon Beemer as Shawn Brady and Martha Madison as Belle Black
- Duration: 1999–
- Created by: Tom Langan (Note: While seeds for the couple's story were planted during Lorraine Broderick's tenure, Shawn and Belle's actual romance does not start until late 1999 during Langan's tenure.)
- Introduced by: Ken Corday and Tom Langan
In-universe information
- Other names: Shelle
- Family: Brady; Horton; Kiriakis
- Spouse: 2007–2016, 2020–
- Children: Claire Brady; Unnamed child (medical abortion)

Shawn-Douglas "Shawn" and Isabella "Belle" Brady are fictional characters on the American soap opera, Days of Our Lives. Shawn-Douglas Brady has been played by Jason Cook (1999–2006, 2015) and Brandon Beemer (2006–2008, 2016–). Belle Black has been played by Kirsten Storms (1999–2004), Charity Rahmer (2004), and Martha Madison (2004–2008, 2015–). Along with Lucas and Sami, the popular couple has been lauded by critics and fans as one of the soap's next supercouples. They are often referred to as the portmanteau "Shelle" (for Shawn and Belle) by fans on internet message boards and in magazines. Shawn and Belle have a daughter, Claire Brady.

== Storylines ==
Shawn and Belle (as portrayed by Jason Cook and Kirsten Storms)

As the children of two of Salem's supercouples, high school sweethearts Shawn-Douglas Brady (the son of Bo Brady and Hope Williams) and Belle Black (the daughter of John Black and Marlena Evans) find love at a young age. The long time friends experienced a high school relationship, with romantic dates and school dances, and quickly fell in love. Unfortunately, the young couple was separated when Shawn claimed to have fathered classmate Jan Spears' baby, actually conceived by a rape while on a school trip to Puerto Rico. Belle was devastated and broke up with Shawn. Back in Salem, Belle and Jan had an argument at Shawn's house and Jan later fell down a flight of stairs and miscarried. Jan blamed Belle for the baby's death, and Shawn believed Jan's claim that the miscarriage was caused by the argument. Belle was hurt that Shawn thought she was capable of something so horrible. After Shawn and Belle's friends were able to prove that Jan's miscarriage was caused by an accident that occurred after Belle had left the house, Shawn begged Belle come back to him, but she refused. After some help from their friends, Shawn and Belle finally reunited and headed off to Salem University.

While at school, Shawn and Belle were tempted to have sex but eventually decided to wait until marriage. Shortly after, Belle left Salem for a short time to take care of some business for her father, John Black's, company in Italy when the Salem Stalker began committing numerous murders in town. Belle's mother, Marlena Evans, was a suspect and when Belle returned to Salem, she covered for some of Marlena's suspicious behavior. This led to the murder of Shawn's beloved great-grandmother, Alice Horton. Shawn could not forgive Belle for covering for her mother and left town (it was later discovered that Marlena and all of the "victims" of the Salem Stalker were alive and taken captive by Andre DiMera). Belle was devastated, especially when Jan returned and told Belle that Shawn had joined the United States Merchant Marines.

Unbeknownst to Belle, Jan had taken Shawn captive, hoping to have him for herself. As a result, Belle turned to Shawn's uncle, Philip Kiriakis, who secretly had a crush on her. While trapped, Shawn was subjected to Jan's brainwashing by telling him that Belle had moved on with Philip and showing him video of the friends spending time together. Shawn refused to believe her. When Shawn finally escaped from Jan's clutches, he had a motorcycle accident and lost part of his memory. He had no recollection of Jan's deception and believed her to be his girlfriend, but he remembered the videos of Belle and Philip and believed that Belle had moved on. When Shawn returned to Salem with Jan, Belle hoped that they could reconcile, but saw he was under Jan's spell. Belle was hurt by his actions and turned to Philip for comfort. Philip confessed his feelings and the two decided to marry. Despite Jan's manipulations, Shawn could not forget Belle. During a blizzard, Belle and Shawn found refuge in a barn. Cold and afraid, the two had sex, though neither remembered due to hypothermia. Belle still planned to marry Philip and a hurt Shawn crashed his motorcycle through the church window at the wedding. His attempt to stop the wedding failed and Belle and Philip were married.

Once Philip, a Marine, was sent to the war in Iraq, Shawn and Belle realized they still loved each other and planned to tell Philip the truth. However, in the war, Philip lost part of his leg and Belle, unable to cause her husband any more distress, decided to remain married to him. Shawn was eventually able to convince her that they should tell Philip about their relationship until Belle learned she was pregnant. She assumed Philip to be the father since neither she nor Shawn had any recollection of the time they had sex in the barn. Belle decided to stay with Philip for the sake of the baby and Shawn moved on to a relationship with Belle's friend, Mimi Lockhart.

After Shawn and Belle's baby, Claire, was born, Belle suffered from postpartum depression and could not understand why she was so unhappy. Her depression worsened as Shawn's relationship with Mimi became serious feeling as though she would lose him forever. Things became worse for the young mother when it was discovered that baby Claire needed a liver transplant to live. Claire finally received the transplant from Shawn's little brother, Zack Brady, when he was hit by a car and died. It was then that Shawn's girlfriend, Mimi, and her mother, Bonnie Lockhart, realized that Shawn was Claire's biological father, not Philip. On her mother's advice, a guilt-ridden Mimi decided to keep the truth from Shawn for fear of losing him to Belle. After Claire's successful transplant, Shawn and Belle both had a vision of little Zack telling them that they belonged together. Belle finally realized she was, and always had been, in love with Shawn and wanted to be with him. However, Shawn was tired of chasing Belle and asked Mimi to marry him and the couple made it down the aisle. Belle realized she had lost Shawn and decided to focus on her life with Philip and Claire.

Since Mimi was unable to conceive a child due to a previous abortion, the couple decided to try in vitro fertilization with a surrogate. Philip and Belle decided have the same procedure, with Belle carrying her own child, and both couples even had the procedure at the same time. However, unbeknownst to either couple, the sperm samples were switched by a gloved hand which caused Belle's egg to be fertilized by Shawn's sperm and Mimi's egg by Philip's sperm. Outraged, Philip declared that the only sane and logical thing to do would be to abort both embryonic cells. Mimi agreed, believing that Belle and Shawn's child would bring the soulmates together again, but Belle and Shawn were determined to keep the baby.

When Shawn's half-sister and troubled teen, Chelsea Benson, was serving her community service (sentenced for causing the accident that killed her brother Zack) at University Hospital, she discovered that Shawn was Claire's father. Determined to turn her life around, Chelsea decided to tell the truth for once. However, because of her strained relationship with Shawn, she knew her brother would not believe her, so she purposely left Claire's hospital file in Shawn's cubicle when he was admitted for alcohol poisoning. Shawn discovered the file but thought it was a mistake or forged. Mimi was relieved to see that both Belle and Philip agreed that it could not be true. An angry Philip looked into the matter to find out who would do such a thing. They soon found out that it was Chelsea. Since Chelsea was arrested for putting Claire's file in Shawn's cubicle, they had to run a DNA test on Shawn, to make sure that the file was inaccurate. Mimi and Bonnie tried to change the lab results so that Shawn would never know, but were unable to complete the job and the results came back positive that Shawn was Claire's biological father. Philip refused to believe that this could be true, so he said he was going to find out himself but took off with Claire. A frantic Belle ran to the police station for help finding her husband and daughter. Shawn found Philip with Claire at the hospital. The lab tech confirmed that Claire was Shawn's. When the police arrived, they convinced an irate Philip to give them Claire and Philip was arrested for disorderly conduct. Then the police gave Claire to Shawn.

Belle was given a scare when she began to have abdominal pains. She and Philip rushed to the hospital where the couple learned that Belle could lose the baby. Meanwhile, Shawn overheard Mimi and Bonnie having a conversation about lying to Shawn about Claire for months. Shawn confronted his wife and mother-in-law and demanded to know how they could keep him away from Claire for the first year of her life. Mimi tried to explain, but Shawn told her their marriage was over. After he left Mimi, Shawn met a girl named Willow who he told his troubles and admitted he was still in love with Belle. When Shawn arrived at the hospital, he was afraid Belle would lose their baby. Equally worried, Belle insisted that she not receive medication that may harm the baby while Philip insisted that she must first protect her life. Belle asked Philip, as next of kin, not to sign the consent form that would hurt the baby. Philip promised he would not, but when the doctors told him that if they did not remove the baby, Belle would die, Philip ultimately signed the consent form. When Belle awoke and Philip told her what he had done, she became hysterical with anger and grief and Philip left Shawn with Belle to grieve for their baby. Shawn told Belle that it was the right decision as it was the only way to save her life. Philip returned after Belle apologized to him.

Shawn and Belle (as portrayed by Jason Cook and Martha Madison)

When Carrie Brady visited Belle in the hospital, the two had a long talk about love and life. Carrie advised Belle that if she really loved Shawn, then she should be with him, as it was unfair to Philip. Meanwhile, Shawn arrived at the hospital with gifts for Belle and Claire and misinterpreted a conversation he overheard between Belle and Carrie. Since he only heard part of the conversation, he misunderstood and thought Belle wanted nothing to do with him. Devastated, he left without talking to Belle.

Shawn then learned that Victor knew he was Claire's father and ran a race car through a wall in the Kiriakis mansion. Bo and Hope talked to their son and tried to get him to calm down. Hope knew her son was in love with Belle and advised him to go see her.

While Belle was still in the hospital recovering from the loss of her baby, her missing mother returned with her father to Salem. She comes to visit Belle in the hospital along with John. They decided they wanted Belle to come stay at the Penthouse with them while she was recovering. In the hospital and once at the penthouse Marlena and Belle had a long heart-to-heart and Belle made a decision regarding her marriage to Philip. She called her husband and asked him to bring Claire to the penthouse where the couple decided to end their marriage. Philip gathered his things and left town. Shawn arrived at the penthouse and he and Belle had a long overdue talk. Just as the destined pair were making progress, Belle was trying to explain why she ended her marriage with Philip by telling Shawn about her conversation with Carrie. Shawn, remembering what he thought he heard, became hurt and angry and left Belle stunned and confused.

Shawn continued to see Willow and even took her out on his father's boat. The two were caught in a storm and had to be rescued by the Coast Guard. Meanwhile, Hope invited Belle to dinner and convinced her to give her relationship with Shawn a chance. Belle agreed and when the two discovered that Shawn was in danger, they hurried to check on him. Belle was shocked to see Shawn and Willow kissing and when she confronted Shawn, he told her that the kiss did not mean anything. Belle was upset at how Shawn had no feelings for this girl, he was just using her to get away from his own problems, and told him that he was no longer the Shawn she once loved. Shawn was hurt and Belle left.

Before Belle would allow Shawn to be a part of Claire's life, she demanded that he get his act together. Shawn obliged and went out to find a job and get a decent place to live so that he could spend time with his daughter. Shawn took a job with the dirty EJ DiMera and began to deliver notes back and forth between EJ and Patrick Lockhart. Shawn got paid a huge amount of money and he bought himself an apartment with Willow. Shawn tried to hide his living arrangements with Willow from Belle, knowing that Belle would not let Willow, a prostitute, anywhere near Claire. Belle ultimately found out the truth about Willow and that Shawn was working for EJ. Willow became furious with Shawn for kicking her out and vowed revenge. Before leaving, she set his apartment on fire and Shawn was forced out of the building. Shawn, Belle, and Claire moved into Bo and Hope's house for a short time to become a family, even though Shawn and Belle were not romantically involved. Shawn quit his dirty job with EJ and tried to get his life together for the sake of Claire and Belle.

Max and Mimi discovered that Philip had gone back into the Marines, and was severely injured. Victor set up Belle in a diner so that she would answer the phone leaving Claire unattended. While she was on the phone with Victor, a woman kidnapped Claire. She was returned to Belle a few hours later unharmed. Meanwhile, Max and Mimi continued to try to track down Philip, but Victor had them locked up in a church basement before they got too close. A bandaged man was seen in a secret room in the Kiriakis Mansion. Victor would secretly bring Claire to the man for visits. The man turned out to be a wounded Philip. Victor had Philip flown to Canada in order to receive a face transplant.

Just when Shawn, Belle, and Claire started to bond as a family, they started to be investigated by a woman named Beverly Healy who worked for Child Protective Services, and who was believed to work for Victor and Philip. Beverly concluded that Shawn and Belle were unfit parents, and had a court order which allowed her to take Claire away from them. Shawn and Belle were horrified when they learned that Philip was fighting for custody of Claire. At the closed hearing, Victor represented Philip, as it was believed that he was unable to appear due to injuries. Shawn and Belle pleaded their case, as Victor did his. Shawn was shocked when Willow testified against him, saying that Shawn never cared about Claire or anyone else, just about his cars and money. Marlena, Bo, Hope, Max, and Mimi were shocked when a bandaged Philip was wheeled into the courtroom in a wheelchair. Shawn and Belle were also shocked, and when Philip revealed his face, Belle yelled, "That is NOT Philip". Philip's injuries are explained and Victor provides proof that it is his son. The judge awards temporary custody to Philip, and tells Shawn and Belle that they need to go to counseling sessions.

After everyone learns that Willow was paid $10,000 to lie on the stand, and everyone knowing that the judge was probably paid off by Victor as well, Shawn and Belle conclude that they need kidnap Claire and go on the run. After Steve helps them over the Canada–US border, Shawn, Belle, and Claire take refuge in a room in an alley. They plan to board a ship that will take them to Australia, but they need the money first. Shawn calls home to his father Bo, and Bo sends Chelsea and Nick to bring them the money that they need. Philip and Willow however, follow Nick and Chelsea, but Nick plants a knife in Philip's suitcase which gets him arrested.

In July 2007, Shawn proposed to Belle, and the pair marry in November 2007. On New Year's Eve 2008, Belle confesses to having sex with Philip before their wedding, causing them to separate. When Shawn contemplated divorce, Claire was once again kidnapped, and with the help of Philip and Chloe, Belle and Shawn find their daughter in Ireland. On the way home from Ireland, Belle and Shawn's plane crashes, and they were saved by John and Steve Johnson. Thankful to be alive and Claire being safe, they were able to work out their differences and decided to give their marriage another chance. The couple left town to sail around the world on the Fancy Face IV, taking Claire with them in March 2008.

In October 2015, Shawn-Douglas returns to Salem to attend his mother's wedding to Aiden Jennings. Belle returns with Claire in November 2015, following the death of Bo, and Belle reveals that during their time in Maine she had an affair and that she and Shawn-Douglas were divorcing. The couple divorce in 2016, but later reconcile. They remarry in 2020.

== Impact ==
Shawn and Belle were nominated for "Most Irresistible Combination" at the 32nd Daytime Emmy Awards.

== See also ==
- List of supercouples
