= List of Days of Our Lives characters introduced in the 2000s =

Days of Our Lives is an American soap opera broadcast on the NBC network. Created by Ted and Betty Corday, the series focuses on the residents of the fictional midwestern town of Salem, USA. It premiered on November 8, 1965. This is a list of notable characters who significantly impacted storylines and made their first appearance between 2000 and 2009.

== J.T. Reiber ==
J. T. Reiber
- Days of Our Lives character
- Portrayed by: Jacob & Joshua Rips (2000–02); Brendan & Dillon Fisher (2000)
- Duration: 2000–02
- First appearance: June 9, 2000
- Last appearance: October 18, 2002
- Created by: Tom Langan
- Introduced by: Ken Corday and Tom Langan
In-universe information
- Other names: John Thomas Brady; John Thomas Reiber
- Father: Glen Reiber
- Mother: Marlo Ungerschterner
- Stepmother: Barb Reiber
- Other relatives: Wilhelm Rolf

J.T. Reiber, born on June 9, 2000, is introduced as the child intended to be adopted by Abe Carver (James Reynolds) and Lexie Carver (Renée Jones). However, Lexie's father Stefano DiMera (Joseph Mascolo) switches the infant at birth with Bo and Hope's (Peter Reckell and Kristian Alfonso) son. After years of trying for a baby the natural way, Abe and Lexie Carver decide that they will adopt a child. When Lexie's father Stefano DiMera hears about the news, he is over joyed at the prospect of finally becoming a grandfather and asks that Abe and Lexie adopt the child of one of his distant relatives. The birth mother Marlo is in fact the niece of Dr. Rolf, Stefano's longtime assistant. However, none the wiser to Lexie and Abe, Stefano is planning a plot whereby Marlo's baby would be switched with the baby of Bo and Hope's who Stefano at the time thought might be his or John Black's. After the births of the babies, Stefano has Dr. Rolf switch Hope's and Marlo's babies birth tags. So, the baby is instead taken home by Bo and Hope Brady and named John Thomas, getting his names from family friend John Black (Drake Hogestyn) and Hope's late grandfather Tom Horton (MacDonald Carey).

He was later reclaimed by his birth father Glen Reiber and new wife Barb.

== Zack Brady ==
Zack Brady
- Days of Our Lives character
- Portrayed by: Alyssa and Lauren Libby (2000–01); Max and Sam Christy (2001); Garrett and Spencer Gray (2001–09); Scott Shilstone (2016, 2022); Brandon Butler (2025)
- Duration: 2000–06; 2008–09; 2016; 2022; 2025
- First appearance: June 9, 2000
- Last appearance: June 2, 2025
- Created by: Tom Langan
- Introduced by: Ken Corday and Tom Langan
- Spin-off appearances: Days of Our Lives: Beyond Salem (2022)
In-universe information
- Other names: Isaac Theo Carver; Beauregard Isaac Theo Brady
- Father: Bo Brady
- Mother: Hope Williams Brady
- Brothers: Shawn-Douglas Brady
- Sisters: Ciara Brady
- Half-sisters: Chelsea Brady
- Grandfathers: Victor Kiriakis; Doug Williams; Shawn Brady (legal)
- Grandmothers: Caroline Brady; Addie Horton
- Uncles: Xander Kiriakis; Philip Kiriakis; Roman Brady; Frankie Brady (adoptive); Max Brady (adoptive); Steve Olson; Douglas LeClaire
- Aunts: Isabella Toscano; Kimberly Brady; Kayla Brady; Julie Williams
- Nephews: Bo Weston; Issac Brady
- Nieces: Claire Brady; Addie Weston
- First cousins: Brady Black; Victoria Kiriakis; Tyler Kiriakis; Carrie Brady Reed; Sami Brady; Eric Brady; Cassie Brady; Rex Brady; Andrew Donovan IV; Theresa Donovan; Stephanie Johnson; Joey Johnson; Spencer Olson; David Banning
- Other relatives: Eli Grant

Zack Brady was the second son and child of supercouple Hope and Bo Brady, born June 9, 2000. For the longest time, Zack is known as Isaac Theo Carver, the long-awaited and much-beloved son of Abe and Lexie Carver. For years the two had tried unsuccessfully to have a child of their own with no success, until Lexie's father, Stefano, got them in touch with Marlo, a young pregnant woman. Abe and Lexie adopt the baby that Marlo has given birth to, unaware that Stefano had switched Marlo and Hope's sons.

Zack dies on January 1, 2006, after being run over by Bo's SUV, which is driven by his daughter, Chelsea. Upon his death, his liver is donated to his niece, Claire Brady, and his corneas are donated to Abe Carver; Claire's life is saved and Abe regains his eyesight. Zack's death and the revelation of Chelsea as the SUV driver drive a wedge between Bo and Hope – as well as the rest of the Brady family for most of 2006.

In June 2016, Hope has a vision of a teen Zack at the age he would have been, had he lived, portrayed by Scott Shilstone.

Shilstone returned to the role in Days of Our Lives: Beyond Salem as an angel to help Bo to convince his mom to return to Earth to help their family. In September 2023, his sister Chelsea returns to Salem for their grandfather Victor Kiriakis' funeral and she announced that she gave birth to her and Max Brady's son, whom they have named Issac after Zack. Brandon Butler will assume the role in June 2025, when Zack appears once more to Bo.

== Bonnie Lockhart ==
Bonnie Lockhart
- Days of Our Lives character
- Portrayed by: Robin Riker (2000); Kathy Connell (2000–2002); Judi Evans (2003–present)
- Duration: 2000–2007; 2017–2018; 2020–present
- First appearance: July 11, 2000
- Created by: Tom Langan
- Introduced by: Ken Corday and Tom Langan (2000); Ken Corday, Albert Alarr and Greg Meng (2017)
In-universe information
- Other names: Maureen Lockhart; Bonnie Maureen Lockhart; Bonnie Horton
- Occupation: Con-artist; Restaurant manager; Housekeeper; Jailbird!; Author of Book "Love Made Me Looney"; Owns Alice's Western Bar
- Husband: David Lockhart (until 2003); Mickey Horton (2004); Justin Kiriakis (2021–present)
- Sons: Patrick Lockhart; Conner Lockhart
- Daughters: Mimi Lockhart
- Stepsons: Alex Kiriakis; Joey Kiriakis; Victor Kiriakis II; Sonny Kiriakis
- Grandchildren: Tyler Kiriakis; Emily Lockhart

Bonnie Lockhart is the mother of Patrick, Mimi, and Conner Lockhart. The role was originated by Robin Riker, who played the role from July 11 to 31, 2000. Kathy Connell then played the role from August 15, 2000, to June 7, 2002. Judi Evans, who previously played Adrienne Johnson Kiriakis, took over the role the following year; she is the most notable actress to play the role and has had the longest tenure. Evans played Bonnie from September 1, 2003, to March 1, 2007. A decade later, Bonnie returned to the show on July 21, 2017, when Evans was also portraying Adrienne Kiriakis. The character departed again on October 25, 2017, then returned on August 20, 2018, and remained on the show until November 6 of that year.

The character of Mimi Lockhart's mother was introduced as "Maureen Lockhart" in 2002. Her storyline mainly dealt with the Lockhart family's homelessness due to her husband David's unemployment. The character was completely reconceived in 2003 with Evans's introduction as Bonnie Lockhart, a brash, trashy schemer and gold-digger. With David having abandoned his family, Mrs. Lockhart reclaims her pre-marriage identity and desists from David's demeaning use of her hated middle name, Maureen. Working as a housecleaner, Bonnie resents her employers and other established families in Salem, even the blue-collar Bradys, because of what she perceives as their privilege. Bonnie frequently interferes in her daughter Mimi's life. When Mimi's boyfriend Rex Brady is believed to be a member of the wealthy DiMera family, Bonnie encourages the relationship. But after Rex's true Brady family heritage is revealed, Bonnie discourages Rex from proposing to Mimi and persuades a pregnant Mimi to have an abortion without telling Rex about the pregnancy. After one of her employers, Maggie Horton, is seemingly murdered in late 2003, Bonnie gets Maggie's widower, Mickey Horton, to marry her. Mickey sets her up as the impresario of Maggie's old restaurant, Chez Rouge, which she reopens as a honky-tonk, Alice's, named after her new mother-in-law, Alice Horton, in hopes of ingratiating herself with Mickey's skeptical family. Mickey ends his marriage to Bonnie to resume his relationship with Maggie after she is found alive. Hoping to extort the Kiriakis family, Bonnie pays Mimi's surrogate Lauren to carry to term after accidentally being implanted with an embryo fathered by Philip Kiriakis instead of by Mimi's boyfriend Shawn-Douglas Brady. In 2007, the skeleton of David Lockhart's murdered corpse is found buried under a church. Bonnie reveals that Mimi killed her abusive father in self-defense years earlier and blacked out the incident. To protect Mimi, Bonnie confesses to killing David and sends Mimi to live in Arizona and look after Connor there. Bonnie stands trial offscreen and is jailed. Bonnie's scheme with Lauren comes to light after Bonnie's incarceration ends the payments, so Lauren abandons the baby, Tyler, who is adopted.

Bonnie escapes from prison in 2017 with the help of Hattie Adams and Anjelica Deveraux. It is established that Bonnie looks identical to Adrienne Kiriakis, which was not addressed in Evans's previous appearances as the characters. Anjelica abducts Adrienne and leaves her imprisoned in Bonnie's place while Bonnie impersonates Adrienne. Anjelica orders Bonnie to break up with Adrienne's boyfriend Lucas Horton and reunite with Adrienne's and Angelica's ex-husband, Justin Kiriakis, and then break his heart, enabling Anjelica to seduce him. Bonnie dumps Lucas, despite her attraction to him. This drives recovering alcoholic Lucas to drink, and when he drunkenly returns to Bonnie's hotel room, she welcomes him for a tryst. When Anjelica suddenly dies of a heart attack, Bonnie focuses on getting revenge on Maggie for, as she sees it, stealing Mickey from her. Using Justin to gain access to the Kiriakis mansion, where Maggie lives as Victor Kiriakis's wife after Mikey's death, Bonnie obtains incriminating information about Victor and attempts to blackmail him into divorcing Maggie and marrying her. Victor agrees, but secretly informs his loved ones about the blackmail, humoring Bonnie to buy time to eliminate the evidence of his crimes. To prevent parolee Sheila Watkins from honoring Adrienne's request to raise the alarm, Bonnie gives Sheila a job as a housekeeper. Victor rebukes Bonnie at the intended wedding, and Adrienne's brother Steve Johnson detects her impersonation and exposes her. She flees Salem before she can be sent back to jail.

The next year, Bonnie returns to Salem with a baby, also named Bonnie, she claims was conceived with Lucas in their one-night stand. A DNA test proves that the baby is Bonnie and Lucas's. Bonnie then hides "Baby Bonnie" and refuses to divulge her whereabouts unless Lucas helps extricate her from her legal problems. Bonnie is set to be released when the truth is revealed: the baby is really Emily, Mimi's daughter by Rex from their own one-night stand in a recent chance meeting. The DNA test produced a false positive due to the close relationships between Bonnie and her daughter, and between brothers Rex and Lucas. Bonnie's deal is rescinded, and Hattie convinces Bonnie to return to prison and serve out the remainder of her sentence.

In 2019, after the show's one-year time jump, Bonnie has been released from prison and written a memoir. Bonnie does not appear onscreen, but Hattie reads Bonnie's book, Love Made Me Loony. Later, Justin represented her and won a settlement for her and the two became close and formed a relationship despite his family's reservations given Bonnie's past transgressions.

In 2020, Charlie Mason from Soaps She Knows praised Bonnie's return, saying "Thankfully, when she [Adrienne] was killed off, she left behind brassy lookalike Bonnie Lockhart to leaven our grief."

== Angela Moroni ==
Angela Moroni was portrayed by Ayda Field from July 27, 2000, until March 2001. Angela Moroni is the daughter of Vincent Moroni, an Italian mob boss. She was introduced during Brandon and Sami's quest to get the tape back with Kate forcing Roberto to confess to the murder of Franco Kelly. Angela came into possession of the tape, but she would only give it to Brandon if he married her. When Brandon and Sami went back to Salem, she came with them and kept the tape with her. When they returned to Europe, Brandon and Angela got married. When a spy from her father saw Brandon and Sami kiss, he hired two gunmen to kill Sami and Brandon at the coronation of Greta Von Amberg. This backfired however, when Angela dove in front of Brandon. Before her death, Angela finally made her father give Brandon and Sami the tape.

== Vincent Moroni ==
Vincent Moroni was portrayed by Carl Weintraub from summer 2000 until March 2001. Vincent Moroni was an Italian mob boss with one daughter, Angela. Upon meeting Brandon and Sami, he was immediately suspicious of them. After Kate told Vincent about the tape (containing Kate telling Roberto to confess to the murder of Franco Kelly) he took it from Angela. When Brandon married Angela anyway, Vincent was convinced he loved his daughter. Kate later had sex with Vincent to convince him to kill Victor and manipulated him into spying on Sami and Brandon. When his spy told him about the kiss he ordered Victor, Brandon and Sami to be murdered at the coronation of Greta Von Amberg. Chaos erupted then and Angela threw herself in front of Brandon, saving his life. Vincent was so upset at the events that he set in motion, that he committed suicide.

== Hattie Adams ==
Hattie Adams
- Days of Our Lives character
- Portrayed by: Andrea Hall (2000–2001); Deidre Hall (2004–2025)
- Duration: 2000–01; 2004; 2016–2020; 2024–2025
- First appearance: August 17, 2000
- Last appearance: February 11, 2025
- Created by: Tom Langan
- Introduced by: Ken Corday and Tom Langan (2000); Ken Corday and Stephen Wyman (2004); Ken Corday, Albert Alarr, and Greg Meng (2016)
In-universe information
- Other names: Marlena Evans
- Husband: John Black (2018)

Hattie Adams is a woman who bore a resemblance to Marlena Evans. Under the guidance of Wilhelm Rolf, she had plastic surgery to increase this resemblance. Stefano DiMera planned to use Hattie against Marlena, but never implemented such a plan. Hattie eventually had further surgery (off-screen) to look identical to Marlena and reappeared briefly in 2004; she was suspected of being a serial killer after Marlena was supposedly witnessed committing the crimes, but it was determined that Marlena had performed the acts under hypnosis and Hattie was not involved. In 2016, an incarcerated Hope Williams Brady encounters Hattie in prison and they become allies; upset that Stefano had interfered in her life, Hattie is pleased that Hope had murdered him. Hattie explains that she had become a secretary in Chicago, but then a man she was dating stole money from her company and framed her for the theft. Hope agrees to help Hattie clear her name, and in exchange Hattie protects Hope from the prison's dominant clique.

She returns in 2024 to audition for a role on Abe and Kate's soap opera venture, Body & Soul. She is briefly fired after causing problems on set with Bonnie Lockhart and was a suspect when the production suffered scandals such as leaked plots and poisoned food. After she's cleared, Bonnie helps to convince Abe and Kate to hire back Hattie. When Abe and Kate sell the rights to the soap's original owners, Hattie leaves for Los Angeles to join the production team there.

Hattie was originally played by Andrea Hall, the real-life identical twin sister of Marlena's portrayer, Deidre Hall. From April 9, 2004, onward, after the character's final surgery and Andrea Hall's retirement from acting, Hattie was played by Deidre Hall. In November 2016, it was confirmed that Deidre Hall would reprise her portrayal of Hattie.

== Barb Reiber ==
Barb Reiber is a character from Days of Our Lives played by Tamara Clatterbuck from March 6, 2001, to August 9, 2002.

She is married to Glen Reiber, the biological father of J. T. Brady, who was switched at birth with Zack Brady, resulting in a complicated custody battle.

== Glen Reiber ==
Glen Reiber
- Days of Our Lives character
- Portrayed by: Paul Logan
- Duration: 2001–02; 2005
- First appearance: March 6, 2001
- Last appearance: December 30, 2005
- Created by: Tom Langan
- Introduced by: Ken Corday and Tom Langan
In-universe information
- Occupation: Construction worker
- Spouse: Barb Reiber
- Children: J.T. Brady

Glen Reiber is the biological father of J.T. Brady, who was switched at birth with Zack Brady, resulting in a complicated custody battle.

While watching TV in Chicago, Glen Reiber saw a sketch of a girl whose body had been found frozen in the ice, in the canal behind Bo and Hope Brady's house after their wedding New Year's Eve. He recognized it as Marlo, his former girlfriend, who had left town suddenly while pregnant. The couple went to Salem, identified the sketch, and Glen inquired about the baby Marlo carried.

Though given the runaround by the Carvers, he and Barb found that Marlo gave birth to a boy, in June 2000, and the Carvers had adopted him. Jennifer Deveraux had a car accident resulting in baby J.T. Brady falling into the river, while strapped in Isaac Carver's baby seat (his name was on it). Barb spotted the baby floating, like Moses in the rushes, and they rescued him. Thinking that he is Isaac, the Reibers fled to his aunt's cabin in the hills. Auntie discovered the surgery scar, and when the baby began to have breathing difficulties, Glen and Barb rushed him to the local hospital, but then returned to Salem. They already had a DNA test to prove Glen was the father of Marlo's child.

Although facing kidnapping charges, Bo and Hope only wanted J.T. back safe, and promised not to press charges. The Reibers returned J.T., and went back to Chicago, where the DNA results arrived. Barb read them secretly, realizing Glen was the father of J.T., and not Isaac's father, and went back to Salem to blackmail Lexie Carver. She succeeded in getting several thousand dollars, and then told Glen that she was pregnant with their child, hoping he will not try to search for the truth. Eventually they both returned to Salem and crashed Lexie's party. When Lexie didn't come up with the million dollars, Barb blew the whistle. Glen sought out a slick attorney, Cameron Reese, to sue for custody of J.T. In the ensuing DNA test, it was proven that Glen was J.T.'s father.

After Glen and Barb won custody of J.T. from Bo and Hope, they returned to Chicago, where they prepared for the birth of their next child. He and Barb promised Bo and Hope that they could see him whenever they wanted.

== Harold Wentworth ==
Harold Wentworth, played by Ryan Scott from January 4, 2001, until 2003, was introduced during a storyline in which Jack Deveraux pretended to be gay in order to spare Greta von Amberg's feelings, as he didn't return her affection. Greta tried to set Jack up with Harold, an openly gay man. Harold worked with Greta to set up situations where he and Jack could be intimate, but Jack would always find a way to escape. Jack eventually admitted that he was not gay, which led to Harold criticizing him for his cowardice. Harold later happened to be in Las Vegas at the same time as Jack and Greta, and he helped them hide from mob hitmen by disguising themselves as showgirls. To his dismay, Jack then learned that Harold was the son of Oliver Wentworth, the owner of the Spectator. This was the local newspaper, which Jack hoped to run; Jennifer got the job instead, due in part to Harold's recommendation. Harold then worked at the Spectator, and was able to maintain a friendly, professional relationship with Jack. He last appeared during the summer of 2003, shortly before the Salem Stalker storyline started. By 2006, though not shown on-screen, Harold had become editor of the Spectator; Jack and Jennifer learned that he was offering them a job running the London bureau of the paper, which they accepted.

== Eugenia Willens ==
Eugenia Willens, played by Daphne Bloomer from 2002 to 2006, worked at Salem University Hospital as a lab tech, but she lost her job and her pension after Sami blackmailed her into looking the other way while Sami switched the results of a paternity test. She later conspired with Kate against Sami and also worked as Lucas' personal assistant at Titan. She briefly dated Lucas.

== Rex Brady ==
Rex Brady
- Days of Our Lives character
- Portrayed by: Eric Winter (2002–2005); Kyle Lowder (2018–2025)
- Duration: 2002–2005; 2018–2023; 2025
- First appearance: July 8, 2002
- Last appearance: April 15, 2025
- Created by: Peter Brash and Paula Cwikly
- Introduced by: Ken Corday and Stephen Wyman (2002); Ken Corday, Albert Alarr and Greg Meng (2018)
In-universe information
- Other names: Rex DiMera
- Occupation: Doctor
- Father: Roman Brady
- Mother: Kate Roberts
- Sisters: Cassie Brady
- Half-brothers: Eric Brady; Lucas Horton; Austin Reed; Philip Kiriakis
- Half-sisters: Carrie Brady; Sami Brady; Billie Reed
- Spouse: Sarah Horton (2019, 2023)
- Children: Emily Lockhart
- Grandfathers: Shawn Brady
- Grandmothers: Caroline Brady
- Uncles: Bo Brady; Frankie Brady (adoptive); Max Brady (adoptive)
- Aunts: Kimberly Brady; Kayla Brady
- Nieces and nephews: Will Horton; Allie Horton; Johnny DiMera; Sydney DiMera; Chelsea Brady; Tyler Kiriakis; Noah Reed; Mackenzie Horton
- First cousins: Andrew Donovan; Theresa Donovan; Stephanie Johnson; Joey Johnson; Shawn-Douglas Brady; Chelsea Brady; Zack Brady; Ciara Brady

Rex Brady was originally portrayed by actor Eric Winter. Rex is the son of Roman Brady and Kate Roberts and twin brother to Cassie Brady.

Rex (as played by Winter) first appeared on July 8, 2002. Rex and his twin sister Cassie were discovered half-naked during a meteor shower and were suspected to be aliens. As time went on it was discovered that they were the children of Andre DiMera (who at the time was impersonating his cousin Tony DiMera) and Marlena Evans but this turned out to be false. In reality, a sperm sample was somehow taken from Roman Brady during his years of captivity at the hands of Tony's father Stefano DiMera and combined with eggs taken from Kate Roberts who was a prostitute and associate of Stefano's.

Rex and, to a lesser extent, Cassie seemed to have super human intelligence. Rex also suffered mysterious mood swings and psychotic tendencies during Salem Stalker storyline. He dated Mimi Lockhart but they broke up when Rex discovered Mimi aborted his baby without telling him about it. Feeling hurt and betrayed, Rex left town following the abortion on July 26, 2005, coinciding with Winter's departure from the show.

Rex returned, played by Kyle Lowder, on October 19, 2018. Lowder vacated the role on August 9, 2019, but made brief reappearances in May 2020, March 2021, and several others. His most recent appearance dealt with him visiting Kate after an off-screen accident and heightened suspicions that his mother may have shot EJ.

In 2020, Belinda Jepsen from Mamamia put Rex and Cassie's introduction on her list of the five "most ridiculous storylines" that occurred on Days of Our Lives, calling the pair "two ridiculously attractive youths".

== Joy Wesley ==
Joy Wesley
- Days of Our Lives character
- Portrayed by: Aisling Acuna (2005); AlexAnn Hopkins (2024–present)
- Duration: 2003; 2005; 2024–present
- First appearance: March 7, 2003
- Created by: Peter Brash and Paula Cwikly (Note: Nancy Wesley's pregnancy with Joy was scripted under the head writing regime of Peter Brash and Paula Cwikly, however, as of the debut of Joy on March 7, 2003, Dena Higley assumed the position of head writer.)
- Introduced by: Ken Corday and Stephen Wyman (2003, 2005); Ken Corday and Janet Spellman-Drucker (2024); Ken Corday and Noel Maxam (2026)
In-universe information
- Parents: Craig Wesley; Nancy Wesley
- Siblings: Chloe Lane
- Children: Kelsey Kiriakis
- Grandparents: Albert Miller
- Nephews: Parker Jonas

Joy Wesley is the daughter of Craig (Kevin Spirtas) and Nancy Wesley (Patrika Darbo), and sister of Chloe Lane (Nadia Bjorlin). First appearing on March 7, 2003, Joy was portrayed by uncredited child actors. In 2005, the character was re-introduced in September 2005 with Aisling Acuna. AlexAnn Hopkins assumed the role in 2024 when Joy returned to Salem in October of the same year. Hopkins exited the role when Joy left Salem and moved to New York City during the March 19, 2025, episode. In March of the following year, it was announced Hopkins would reprise the role when Joy returned on April 24.

Joy was conceived by Craig and Nancy Wesley following Chloe's diagnosis with leukemia, with the hope that her bone marrow would be a match for Chloe, in order to save her life. After her birth, Joy is a tested match and donates her bone marrow to save Chloe's life. In October 2024, Joy returns to Salem and meets Johnny DiMera (Carson Boatman) and nearly sleeps with him but Johnny backs off not wanting to betray Chanel, his wife. It's revealed she arrived in Salem to audition for Body & Soul and was cast opposite Chanel as her rival for the affections of a man played by Alex Kiriakis (Robert Scott Wilson). Chanel found out about hers and Johnny's encounter and quit the show, not wanting to anywhere near Joy. She turns to Alex for comfort, having sex with him in the process.

Her acting career is cut short however, after the cast and crew are poisoned by Whitley King and Abe and Kate decide to sell the show back to their original owners in Los Angeles, leaving actors like Joy and Alex recast. Despite her connection with Alex, he still loved Stephanie Johnson (Abigail Klein) and Joy breaks it off with him. She later discovers she is pregnant with his baby and opts to tell him and Stephanie her pregnancy test was negative before leaving for New York to be with her family.

== Patrick Lockhart ==
Patrick Lockhart
- Days of Our Lives character
- Portrayed by: Brody Hutzler
- Duration: 2004–2007
- First appearance: February 17, 2004
- Last appearance: January 3, 2007
- Created by: James E. Reilly
- Introduced by: Ken Corday and Stephen Wyman
In-universe information
- Parents: David Lockhart; Bonnie Lockhart
- Siblings: Mimi Lockhart; Conner Lockhart
- Aunts: Calista Lockhart
- Nieces and nephews: Tyler Kiriakis; Emily Lockhart

Patrick Lockhart, played by Brody Hutzler, made his first appearance on February 17, 2004. Hutzler's casting was confirmed a couple of days ahead of his debut appearance. His character was introduced as the brother of Mimi Lockhart (Farah Fath), and was billed as having "a mysterious connection to Jack Devereaux". Patrick deliberately befriends Jennifer Deveraux (Melissa Reeves) and the viewers learn he is working with a mysterious "cohort", but Hutzler did not immediately reveal why. He stated: "Put it this way, Patrick is very good at what he does, and what he does is con people. But whatever he was prepared to do with Jennifer after her husband, Jack (Matthew Ashford), supposedly died hasn't quite worked out." Fans of the serial reckoned Patrick fell in love with Jennifer, which is where his plan started to come undone. Hutzler agreed that Patrick had "deep feelings" for Jennifer, which is shown when he saves her after she goes into labor while she is trapped on a ledge.

In September 2006, Toby Goldstein from Tribune Media Services reported that Hutzler would be leaving Days of Our Lives, following his character's arrest for murder. He was one of six cast members departing the show. In 2010, Hutzler said that he would be happy to return to the role, believing that it would be "awesome". Jamey Giddens from Daytime Confidential called Patrick a "hunky bad boy" who "helped a certain Fancy Face get over the loss of her son Zach in Salem" and provided her with "a little TLA (Tender Loving Abs)". Matt Purvis from Soaps She Knows called Patrick a "charming troublemaker".

Patrick grew up with his mother Bonnie Lockhart, sister Mimi, and brother Conner Lockhart on the streets (his father David had an on/off relationship with his mother). He spent most of his time protecting his family and being the man of the household. He also was a childhood conman. While unclear why, Patrick left Salem and may not have even finished high school.

Patrick made his dramatic re-entrance to Salem when Jennifer Deveraux literally ran into him with her car. They were both taken to the hospital and Jennifer felt guilty because Patrick had no insurance and no place to stay. He soon tricked Jennifer into paying his medical bills. She then offered him a home in her garage apartment, which he gratefully accepted.

Soon after, it became obvious that there was more to Patrick Lockhart than met the eye. Jennifer and all of her friends were shocked when they learned that his mother was housekeeper Bonnie Lockhart. Patrick continued to live in Jennifer's garage apartment and took care of her throughout her difficult pregnancy, even mysteriously saving the baby with the help of an antique doubloon. It was soon revealed that Patrick had been doing dealings with some sort of mobster and had been hired to come to Salem to kill Jennifer, which since he had grown attached to her, he refused to do.

When Jennifer left to find Jack Deveraux, Patrick was determined to find her. He and Hope Brady took off in a cargo plane and followed Jennifer to the remote tropical island where Tony DiMera was holding all of the "victims" of the Salem Stalker. Patrick and Hope's plane was shot down in the ocean and the two swam to shore and found all of the "dead" people of Salem. Not long after, they ended up in the jungle, where Patrick delivered Jennifer's baby, Jack Jr. They ended up in Tony's compound, where Patrick's history as a DiMera operative became clear. He even helped DiMera keep some of the Salemites hostage. When push came to shove, however, he helped his new friends escape. It was around this time that Patrick's beard fell right off his face.

Patrick returned to Salem, where he returned to his old life. He grew closer to Billie Reed and to Hope Brady, both of whom trusted him, but Bo Brady did not. He and Billie briefly hooked up, but they both seem interested in others, namely Bo & Jennifer. Patrick soon went to a place called Morgan Island and ran into Hope who had recently lost her son Zack. He comforted her and the two soon had sex. While on the island Patrick admitted that he had been to the island before and that he had fallen in love with a woman named Alma Delgado and the two had plans to elope/wed and have a family. She was mysteriously gunned down before the two of them managed to run away. Patrick always felt guilty and that it was because of his dealings with the mob that had resulted in Alma's death. But with a letter found by Hope from Alma to Patrick it revealed that it was Alma's own mob dealings that had ended her life.

After returning to Salem he fell in love with Hope and tried to manipulate her into divorcing her husband. After Hope found out that she was pregnant Patrick bribed her doctor into changing test results to show that he was the father when Bo really was. Even with the test changes, Bo and Hope began to grow closer so Patrick tried to get Hope to go away with him. Hope soon learned that Patrick was working with EJ Wells and had committed many terrible crimes including being the gloved hand and murdering officer Eve Michaels. Soon after, Patrick kidnapped Hope and took her to an abandoned warehouse where he told her that he had only got close to her on Morgan Island because he was ordered to and that now he had been ordered by E.J. to kill her. Bo soon found them and when Patrick tried to leave with Hope, her water broke. Hope then delivered a baby girl that Patrick finally admitted it was Bo's daughter. Patrick is sent to prison.

== Alex North ==
Alex North
- Days of Our Lives character
- Portrayed by: Wayne Northrop
- Duration: 2005–2006
- First appearance: August 1, 2005
- Last appearance: May 24, 2006
- Created by: James E. Reilly
- Introduced by: Ken Corday; Stephen Wyman
In-universe information
- Occupation: Doctor
- Spouse: Marlena Evans

Alex North was portrayed by Day of Our Lives veteran Wayne Northrop from August 1, 2005, to May 24, 2006. Alex North was brought to Salem by John Black to help John's wife Marlena Evans recover from amnesia. Marlena had memories of Alex and, after discovering they had been married (North had been presumed dead after being captured on a mission in Vietnam), she chose him instead of John because Alex was controlling her mind. It was soon discovered that he had been an abusive husband and, after a fight with John, he was presumed dead after falling over the edge of a cliff. The Alex North storyline was very unpopular with viewers.

== Claire Brady ==
Claire Brady
- Days of Our Lives character
- Portrayed by: Olivia and Ava White (2006–2007); Alina Foley (2008); Olivia Rose Keegan (2015–2020); Isabel Durant (2020–2021)
- Duration: 2005–2008; 2015–2021
- First appearance: September 27, 2005
- Last appearance: August 20, 2021
- Created by: James E. Reilly
- Introduced by: Ken Corday and Stephen Wyman (2005); Ken Corday, Greg Meng, and Albert Alarr (2015)
In-universe information
- Other names: Claire Kiriakis
- Occupation: Student; Singer; Hospital assistant; Personal assistant
- Parents: Shawn-Douglas Brady; Belle Black
- Grandfathers: Bo Brady; John Black
- Grandmothers: Hope Williams Brady; Marlena Evans
- Uncles: Zack Brady; Brady Black; D.J. Craig; Eric Brady; Paul Narita
- Aunts: Chelsea Brady; Ciara Brady; Sami Brady
- First cousins: Will Horton; Allie Horton; Johnny DiMera; Sydney DiMera; Grace Brady (legal); Tate Black; Rachel Black; Mackenzie Horton; Isaac Brady; Beauregard “Bo” Weston

Claire Brady was originally portrayed by identical twins Olivia and Ava White from January 2006 to December 2007 and then Alina Foley in 2008. In July 2015, it was announced the character would be rapidly aged with actress Olivia Rose Keegan, as part of the show's fiftieth anniversary. In May 2016, Keegan stated she was on contract. She left the role in July 2019, returning briefly on October 31 of that year, and returned again on June 1, 2020. Two months later, it was announced she would again vacate the role, with her last appearance being on August 11 with Isabel Durant first appearing in the role the next day.

On September 27, 2005, Claire Kiriakis was born at St. Luke's during the almost wedding of Sami Brady and Lucas Roberts delivered by her maternal grandmother, Marlena Evans, and Lexie Carver. Philip and Belle chose Claire as her name when she was born, Mimi Lockhart and Shawn-Douglas Brady became Godparents. Claire became very ill when she was just a few months old and Belle took her to the hospital. It was there that Kate found out Claire's blood type was AB− and knew that she wasn't Philip's daughter. She kept it from Philip and Belle but told Victor. Mimi found out the same information and kept it secret, because she was marrying Shawn and didn't want him to find out the truth and go back to Belle. A little after thanksgiving, Claire needed a liver transplant and her doctor Lexi Carver found Claire's uncle Zack Brady as a match. He had died the same night and his liver was donated to Claire. She survived and went home with Philip and Belle. It was a few months later that Mimi spilled the news to Shawn that she too knew all along that Claire wasn't Philip's baby. Belle and Philip had a DNA test done and Philip was devastated. Later, Belle took Claire to her parents and left Philip, after she miscarried. Philip tried to get full custody of Claire after he returned from war, but Belle and Shawn took the baby and ran to Toronto and stayed at a shelter where 'Merle' helped them escape to Australia on a cruise ship. Upon their return to Salem, Philip promised to leave Claire with her rightful family. Claire was aged at this point and then kidnapped by Crystal Miller and brought to New Ross, Ireland for protection. This is where she was found in January 2008 by Hope, Bo, John, Marlena, Belle, Chloe, Philip and Shawn. Claire's grandmother Colleen Brady revealed the source of the Brady/DiMera feud when she admitted to her affair with Santo DiMera. She also revealed that she was John's mother, making her Claire's great-grandmother. Colleen admitted to everyone that she was terminally ill and died shortly after. On the way home from Ireland, Claire and her parents, along with everyone else flying back, faced a traumatic plane crash due to sabotage caused by Ava Vitali. Claire's great-grandfather, Shawn Brady, died a hero on the plane saving his son's life. Upon arrival in Salem, Claire's grandfather, Bo, was rushed to the hospital for pancreatic failure and went through a life-saving surgery. Claire's parents, Belle and Shawn, reunited and decided to take Claire and sail around the world.

In November 25, Claire returned to Salem with her mother as a teenager for thanksgiving and her grandpa Bo's funeral. During the family's absence from Salem, they had settled down in Maine, but Nicole had not Cheated Daniel and now Claire's parents were separated. Shawn decided to return to Maine and Claire went to visit him. She returned to spend Christmas in Salem with her family, and she got to know some of the younger residents like Gabi Hernandez, and her and Will's daughter Arianna Horton. Eve Donovan heard Claire singing in Horton Town Square, and asked her to be part of a music event she was organizing. Claire was ecstatic, but Belle suggested that Claire should spend Christmas with her father. Claire accused her mother they are about to get married, but Belle said she was sorry they weren't. Claire told her mother she wasn't sorry and felt she wanted to start over without her and Shawn.

Claire was offered a chance to go to New York for an audition by Eve, but Claire was hesitant to go, and Eve encouraged her to give it some thought. Claire was later upset to see Philip and Belle together. Claire asked Philip to stay away from Belle, and said she and her father just needed time to figure things out. Soon after seeing her mother get close with Philip, she phoned her father to come back to Salem so he can save her mother from herself. Claire noticed that Ciara seemed to have a crush on Chase, and Ciara pointed out that Claire also seems to be crushing on Chase. Ciara encouraged Claire to talk to Chase, but Chase told her he wasn't ready to date. Belle and Claire's relationship became fractured even more when Belle told Eve to stay away from Claire. Eve encouraged Belle not to give up on a relationship with her mom. Eve and Claire went to New York for audition. Claire failed the audition, and was so disappointed that she left New York by herself, and returned to Salem.

In an effort to cheer Claire up, Belle bought Victor's nightclub, so Claire could practice her singing. Claire saw it as a way in trying to buy her love, and rejected the gesture. Claire noticed that Ciara wasn't acting herself, and also a seemed to hold a lot of resentment for Chase. Claire decided to ask Chase out, but he rejected the offer. Claire told Ciara that she has asked Chase out, and Ciara reluctantly admitted to Claire that Chase had raped her. Claire, Theo Carver, and Joey Johnson all kidnapped Chase and brought him to a warehouse, so Ciara could confront Chase. Afterwards, the police were called and Chase was arrested. Claire focused on being a friend to Ciara, and her music. Both Ciara and her parents were impressed with Claire's talent. Claire helped set up for prom where Mark McNair forcibly kissed Ciara, causing Theo to beat him up. Claire took her classmate Henry to the prom, and encouraged Ciara to go as well. At the prom, someone rigged the projector to show humiliating photos of Ciara and Theo. When the group saw Mark smirking, they deduced he was behind it, and vandalized his car as payback. Unfortunately, the car belonged to Mark's father, who was also a judge. The teens were all put in jail for the night, and bailed out the next day. Later, while having breakfast Claire noticed a moment between her parents and they announced they were back together.

Claire decided to drop out of school, and focus on her music. She took and Shawn and Belle's skepticism as not being supportive, but they later told her they would support her if this is what she wants. When Chloe Lane returned to town, she and Philip partnered up in the music business, and offered Claire a recording contract. Claire discovered Chloe was pregnant, and that she didn't want anyone to know. Later her parents got back together in the summer of 2016. But they had to leave for Hong Kong for her mother's work. She remained in Salem where she was around for the prison break of Orpheus, Xander Kiriakis, and Clyde Weston, she was kidnapped by them for money in exchange. She was eventually rescued by her grandpa John and Steve Johnson. After the siege, Claire began hitting on Theo. They began dating. Claire and Ciara began to work as volunteers at the hospital. Soon when Valerie Grant came back to town, Theo was suspicious for her as he thought she was keeping a secret from his father who she began to date. Claire decided to help him spy on her to find out her secret, this got her into conflict with Ciara as she believed she's making Theo do things that are wrong.

In 2017, Claire began to realize that Theo still has feelings for Ciara and decides to do whatever it takes to break them up. She hid a letter that Ciara had written for Theo which details her feelings for him. Her friend Jade offered her a way into becoming more famous by making a sex-tape but she refused. However, Jade was persistent for she believed she knew best and so she secretly taped Theo and Claire having sex. On June 13, Theo's father Abe Carver and Claire's grandmother Hope Brady discovered the sex video by accident on Theo's computer, they confronted them about it. Both Theo and Claire denied being behind it. Soon however Theo began accusing Claire of being behind this, this broke her heart and after it was revealed that it was Jade who did this all on her own, Claire realized that Theo doesn't trust her so she broke up with him. Claire spoke to her grandmother Marlena on her heartbreak and told her everything about her paranoia of Theo and Ciara's feelings for each other. She gave Theo the letter Ciara had written for him months ago and he was in disbelief that she could do something like this. Later in the summer, she took a job as a waiter.

On August 10, Claire meets with Tripp at work and he gave her back an MP3 player she had recently let him borrow. Tripp raved about how amazing her voice is and how he has no doubts she will be among the best singers in the future. He reveals to her that he plans to leave Salem, because he is the one who set Kayla up. He explains why and Claire's shocked. She was able to convince him to apologize to her. Claire started to excuse herself so she'd get back to work, but before walking away, she asked if she was ever going to see Tripp again. He's not sure. She gave Tripp her MP3 player to Tripp as a sort of reminder of her.

When she and Joey learn of Chad's arrest, Joey informed her that he plans to confess on killing Ava, and was surprised to hear that Tripp knew he killed his mother and yet did not turn his brother in. On August 31, Claire suggested to Theo that Tripp could move in with them and this made Theo jealous, believing she and Tripp have gotten close. Later, Claire offered Tripp to move into her and Theo Carver's apartment, which he happily accepted despite Theo's reluctance. She began noticing Theo's jealousy to grow right before she leaves to go help Tripp move his stuff into the apartment. Later, Theo confessed his love for Claire and they got back together.

On October 19, Claire helped Tripp get a job at the same cafe she's working at as a waiter. This brought her into conflict with a jealous Theo. On November 13, at the loft, Claire revealed to Tripp that she told Theo that she really feels comfortable around him, for he understands and captivates her better than him. When they are playing video games they share a close moment, which is interrupted by a call. Claire learns that Theo has been shot. Claire faints because of the news, and Tripp stays next to her in the hospital. On December 26, Theo wakes up from his coma and Claire is beyond relieved. Ciara and Claire continue fighting and on December 28, Claire learns of Tripp's feelings for her. She did not reciprocate.

In June 2020, Claire called Marlena to Bayview and said she was well enough to be released. Marlena agreed to talk to Claire's doctors. Claire also had plans to attend Ciara and Ben's upcoming wedding. She found out about it by swiping her doctor's invitation since he had also treated Ben. Claire's new friend Gwen Rizczech inquired about her interest in Ciara and Ben. Claire mentioned Ciara was her dad's little sister, and Gwen said Ciara was Claire's aunt. Claire said she was, but she never calls Ciara that. Claire told Gwen that she had tried to kill Ciara, and Gwen realized Ciara had been the person she was referring to. Claire expressed her desire to be Ciara's maid of honor, and Gwen wondered if Claire had an ulterior motive. Claire denied it, and Gwen promised to keep her secret.

== Willow Stark ==
Willow Stark was played by Annie Burgstede from October 2006 to June 2007. Willow was a former prostitute who Shawn Brady met one evening. Shawn got Willow a job at Chez Rouge and started dating her after he broke up with his ex-wife Mimi Lockhart. She became more controlling and obsessed with Shawn and disliked that Shawn tried to see Claire or Belle. Shawn broke things off with her so he could be a better father so she set fire to his loft. Weeks later, EJ DiMera paid her to break into the Brady home and she accidentally set fire to the place. She planted Chelsea Brady's brush at the scene, but Nick Fallon hid the brush, so she was sent to jail. Once Nick bailed her out, he helped her find a place to live. Willow attempted to blackmail Nick and eventually fell to her death on an episode that aired June 5, 2007. She has a younger brother named Jed Stark who attended Salem University.

== Nick Fallon ==
Nick Fallon
- Days of Our Lives character
- Portrayed by: Blake Berris (2006–2023); Stacey Haiduk (2023); Judi Evans (2023); Chrishell Stause (2023)
- Duration: 2006–2009; 2012–2014; 2021; 2023
- First appearance: November 7, 2006
- Last appearance: February 24, 2023
- Created by: Hogan Sheffer and Meg Kelly
- Introduced by: Ken Corday and Stephen Wyman
- Spin-off appearances: Days of Our Lives: A Very Salem Christmas (2021)
In-universe information
- Other names: Lonely Splicer; Susan Banks (2023); Adrienne Johnson Kiriakis (2023); Jordan Ridgeway (2023)
- Occupation: Researcher for Mad World Cosmetics (2014); Freelance consultant for Mad World Cosmetics (2014); Associate for Mad World Cosmetics (2013); Dishwasher at the Brady Pub (2012); Associate Professor at Salem University; Salem Hospital Lab Technician; Worker for the Horton Foundation at Salem University Hospital
- Family: Horton
- Parents: Joshua Fallon; Jessica Blake
- Wife: Cassandra Arvin (2007); Gabi Hernandez (2013)
- Grandparents: John Talbot; Sunny Chisholm; Alex Marshall; Marie Horton
- Uncles: Tod Chandler
- Other relatives: Julie Olson Williams; Hope Williams Brady; Will Horton; Arianna Horton

Nick Fallon was played by Blake Berris from November 7, 2006, to January 15, 2009. In May 2012, it was announced that Berris would return to the series. He returned on August 27, 2012. His final air date was May 12, 2014, when the character was killed in a whodunit murder mystery. In 2021, Berris reprised the role in a guest appearance on the soap and in Days of Our Lives: A Very Salem Christmas.

Nick is the son of Joshua Fallon and Jessica Blake who comes to Salem to get to know his Horton relatives. His medical knowledge and intelligence are put to the test when he is asked to help save Kayla Brady, who was suffering from a rare ailment. He succeeds in saving her and finds himself intrigued by Kayla's niece, Chelsea Brady. In an attempt to get Chelsea to fall for him, Nick creates an online identity to chat with her and uses a picture of a handsome colleague of his as his own.

Later, Nick helps Chelsea send money to Shawn Brady and Belle Black who are on the run with their daughter Claire in Toronto, Ontario, Canada. Nick's clever and brave actions cause Chelsea to take interest in him. However, shortly after returning from Canada, she discovers Nick is her online love. She is devastated and sees Nick's actions as a malicious trick, thinking that Nick used the online lover to secretly mock her as she revealed her inner thoughts and feelings for the first time. She tearfully tells Nick that she never wants to see him again. Hurt, Nick has an affair with Chelsea's mother Billie Reed, who under the influence of alcohol seduces him. They both regret it and swear never to tell anyone.

When Nick saves Chelsea from being raped by Dr. Reibert, whom she is dating to spite Nick, she forgives him. Nick begins tutoring her in math and the two end up dating. Chelsea soon discovers Nick and Billie's one-night stand and their relationship is again in turmoil. Later, when Willow Stark accidentally sets Bo and Hope's house on fire, she panics and attempts to frame Chelsea by planting her hairbrush at the crime scene. At Chelsea's cry of innocence, Nick risks his medical career by stealing the hairbrush out of the forensics lab. Chelsea is so grateful that she is able to forgive Nick for his indiscretion with Billie, and they soon rekindle their romance.

Later, Willow emerges as a threat to Nick and Chelsea's happiness. When Nick steals the hairbrush, it leaves Willow as the only suspect for the fire. Nick feels sorry for her and lends her money. Willow asks for more money, and Nick leases an apartment for her and gives her his credit card to use for her and her baby. Willow uses Nick's credit card excessively, then calls him and blackmails him into giving her more.

Nick goes to the beach to meet Willow and the two get into an argument. In the ensuing struggle she falls, hitting her head on a log. Despite Nick's attempts to revive her, she dies. He finds the hairbrush in her possession and buries it in the sand on the beach before calling for help. While Nick is investigated by detective Roman Brady, he convinces Chelsea to go to the beach and destroy the hairbrush. Roman eventually learns the truth, and gives both Chelsea and Nick a pass by closing the investigation.

Nick is also blackmailed by Kate Roberts into making Sami's amniocentesis say that EJ was the father of Sami's twins.

Nick saves Sami and Lucas Roberts from a bomb that Dr. Rolf planted, sustaining head injuries in the process. While suffering from a concussion, Nick goes to Las Vegas and marries a woman named Cassandra Arvin who is using the alias "China Lee". Arvin is eventually persuaded to sign annulment papers. She is arrested and goes to jail for soliciting, leaving Nick with custody of her two sons, Artemis and Demarquette. Nick deduces that Artemis and Demarquette are not really China Lee's children, which she confirms upon her release from jail. She had been hired to protect the boys, but refuses to retake custody of them. A man named Umar Abboud comes to Nick's home and claims that he works for the boys' parents and had been sent to bring them home. Nick does not trust Abboud, and Jeremy Horton, who is staying with Nick at the time, successfully fights him off. Weeks later, Chelsea is abducted. She is permitted to use her cell phone only to contact Nick, who is directed to come to a designated location, alone. There the kidnapper offers a hostage exchange: Artemis and Demarquette for Chelsea. Unbeknownst to the man, the boys had followed Nick to the warehouse, but are able to escape. While Nick works to avert the detonation of what turns out to be a fake bomb, Artemis and Demarquette are rescued by Umar Abboud. Abboud is in the employ of the boys' parents, who are wealthy foreigners with many enemies. Having secured political asylum, they wanted to be reunited with their sons; Chelsea's abduction had been a ploy by the family's enemies. Nick agrees to let Artemis and Demarquette go.

Nick and Chelsea reunite. He helps Chelsea find proof that Ford Decker was the campus rapist by breaking into Ford's room in order to take photographs of his drugs and journal. After the campus rapist situation is resolved, Chelsea and Nick grow apart because of her attraction to Dr. Daniel Jonas, and the two eventually break up. Nick then begins working on a research project involving alternative fuel sources and begins a relationship with Max Brady's half-sister, Melanie Layton. Nick ultimately starts stalking her and is later revealed to be the killer of Trent Robbins, Max and Melanie's father.

On January 14, 2009, Nick is tried for the murder of Trent Robbins. Maggie and Melanie give testimony as to why Nick should not receive a life sentence. The judge agrees and sentences Nick to 2 to 5 years in a facility and 18 months for good behavior. Nick is thankful to Melanie for her testimony as she tells Nick she forgives him because deep down he is a good person.

On January 15, 2009, Chelsea comes from the hospital to the courthouse. Nick tells Chelsea he is sorry for everything and tells her to move on with her life. Chelsea tearfully tells Nick that he will always have a piece of her heart and that he can focus on getting better.

On August 27, 2012, Nick returns to Salem and, still in jail, has a parole hearing. Having been recently kidnapped, Melanie does not know how she feels. Against the advice of her family, Melanie decides that Nick really had changed, but wants him to stay away from her. Nick is released and threatened by Chad to stay away. Caroline forgives Nick and gives him a job at the Brady Pub. Chad beats Nick up after believing that he has Melanie, since he has her scarf. Later, Nick meets Melanie's former friend Gabi and they start dating. On November 14, Gabi finds out she is pregnant with her gay ex-boyfriend Will Horton's baby. Nick agrees with Gabi and Will that he will raise the child and that he and Gabi will get married. Nick and Gabi have a church wedding, but before they can be pronounced husband and wife, Chad objects, saying that Nick is not the father of Gabi's baby, and it finally comes out that Will is the father.

At a later date, Nick blackmails Will to give up his parental rights to Arianna by threatening to tell that Will was the one who shot EJ. With several other people around, including Sami, Lucas, EJ, Sonny, and an attorney Nick brings, Will signs the agreement. Nick and Gabi marry in a private ceremony. Only later does Gabi learn that Will gave up his rights to the baby, but she does not learn about the blackmail, though Will tells her he did not want to do it.

Nick has memories of something terrible that happened in jail, possibly involving another inmate, Vargas, who was recently released and is getting help from the church to adjust to regular life. It is later revealed to be repeated prison rape by another inmate named Jensen.

Nick is kidnapped, along with Gabi, and held hostage by Jensen. Will and Sonny save them, with Will getting shot in the process. Nick then tries to make things right, considering that Will almost died to save him, and agrees to have Will's name on Arianna's birth certificate. Nick tells Gabi the truth about his rape and about blackmailing Will.

Nick is fired by Kate in June 2013. In August 2013, when his parole is up, he is told by Victor Kiriakis to vacate the Kiriakis mansion immediately. Nick becomes obsessed with Gabi and gets her a modeling job in New York, where he will be as well, hoping that they can be together. After Gabi yells at him for interfering in her life, he follows her to the park where he tries to rape her. Gabi hits him in the head with a rock and Sami and Kate help her drag Nick's body to the river where he briefly awakes before apparently drowning on November 27.

On January 24, 2014 Nick arrives at Gabi and Will's daughter's baptism revealing that he had not drowned. He appears reformed but soon blackmails Kate into hiring him. Nick also manipulates Gabi into giving him another chance, and she feels that she must do so or risk going to jail for trying to murder Nick. Nick later manipulates EJ DiMera and Sami into giving Gabi a modeling contract with Countess Wilhelmina. Later, Nick gets involved in the custody agreement for Will and Gabi's daughter, pushing Gabi to only let Will see his daughter when she allows it. Will and Sonny feel that Nick would manipulate Gabi until he has her and Ari to himself. In the meantime, EJ finds out that someone had pictures of him and Abigail Deveraux kissing sent to his house. EJ and Abigail later find out that Nick was behind it. On May 9, 2014, Nick is shot three times, once in the back and twice in the chest, and he dies on May 12 with an open investigation into who was responsible. On May 30, 2014, it is revealed that it was Gabi Hernandez who shot Nick.

On Halloween 2021, Nick's corpse was raised as a zombie by the devil-possessed Marlena Evans and was sent to terrorize Gabi. Jake DiMera and Gabi managed to stop Nick and return him back into his grave. In A Very Salem Christmas, Will writes a story where Nick is still alive and he and Gabi become a couple during the holidays.

Nick returns in 2023 when he tricks Marlena Evans, Kate Roberts, and Kayla Brady into signing their souls away to Satan under the guise of Susan Banks, Jordan Ridgeway and Adrienne Kiriakis. He nearly succeeds until Jake Lambert-DiMera appears and reveals that the three women are still alive and that Nick only did it to cause pain to Will. Jake reminds Nick that Julie Olsen Williams always loved him and believed there was still something good in him. This convinces Nick to send the women back to Earth.

== Duck ==
Duck, played by Franc Ross from March to May 2007, is a Vietnam War veteran who lives on the fictional island Tinda Lao with his daughter Gabby.

== Gabby ==
Gabby, played by Joy Bisco, is a young woman who lives on the fictional island, Tinda Lao. Her father is Duck. When Shawn-Douglas Brady was in Tinda Lao, she fell in love with him, but he stuck to his fiancée, Belle Black. She appeared on the soap in 2007.

== Morgan Hollingsworth ==
Morgan Hollingsworth was portrayed by Kristen Renton from September 28, 2007, to October 3, 2008.

She was President of Alpha Chi Theta sorority, where Chelsea and Stephanie pledged. Morgan dated Max Brady and was almost a victim of Ford Decker, the campus rapist. She and the Alpha Chi Theta girls conspired to stop Ford from raping again but their plan backfired and he fell to his death. Soon after Ford's death and the coverup was exposed, Max and Morgan broke up.

Morgan later went to work for Tony as his intern at the same time Stephanie interned for Anna's rival firm. Morgan's interests moved to Philip Kiriakis soon after her father, Paul, disappeared. John Black and Phillip were involved in a heated shipping rivalry that turned ugly when gun fire broke out. Phillip took a bullet intended for Morgan after one of Ava's goons tried to shoot her. Morgan helped Phillip with his recovery and they shared a short romance. After Paul was revealed to be alive, Phillip admitted to threatening Paul's life and was later caught kissing Chloe. Morgan left town to take a two-year internship in Chicago.

== Tyler Kiriakis ==
Tyler Kiriakis
- Days of Our Lives character
- Portrayed by: Gabriella & Thalia
- First appearance: August 10, 2007
- Last appearance: October 22, 2007
- Created by: Hogan Sheffer and Meg Kelly
- Introduced by: Ken Corday and Stephen Wyman
In-universe information
- Other names: Ty Johnson; Tyler Wilkins
- Family: Kiriakis; Roberts
- Father: Philip Kiriakis
- Mother: Mimi Lockhart
- Siblings: Emily Lockhart
- Grandfathers: Victor Kiriakis; David Lockhart
- Grandmothers: Kate Roberts; Bonnie Lockhart
- Uncles: Bo Brady; Austin Reed; Lucas Horton; Rex Brady; Patrick Lockhart; Connor Lockhart
- Aunts: Isabella Toscano; Billie Reed; Cassie Brady
- First cousins: Brady Black; Shawn-Douglas Brady; Chelsea Brady; Zack Brady; Ciara Brady; Will Horton; Allie Horton; Noah Reed; Emily Lockhart

Tyler Kiriakis is the son of Philip Kiriakis and Mimi Lockhart. In July 2006, Philip Kiriakis and then-wife Belle Black were planning to have a second child, as were their friends/nephew Shawn-Douglas Brady and his then wife Mimi Lockhart were also plan to have a baby. Both couples planned to use artificial insemination. A gloved hand switched the samples so Belle ended up pregnant with Shawn's baby and Shawn and Mimi's surrogate ended up pregnant with Philip and Mimi's child. It wasn't long until both couples learned the truth that there was a switch in the petri dishes. Philip and Mimi wanted to have both babies aborted but Belle chose not to have her child aborted. Unfortunately, she later had complications and her child was lost. After Shawn and Mimi separated, Mimi signed away their rights to the child and left its fate up to the surrogate mother Lauren Chaffee. Bonnie Lockhart was paying Lauren with the intent to mother the child but Bonnie was sent to jail and Lauren was left to give birth on her own.

Philip and his sister Billie have traced Lauren's steps and now believe that "Pocket" or Ty Johnson, the baby boy being fostered by Kayla Brady and Steve Johnson, is actually Tyler.

== Allie Horton ==
Allie Horton
- Days of Our Lives character
- Portrayed by: Elle and Ithaca Kremer (2007–2008); Charlotte and Stella Penfield (2008); Ella and Anna Gietzen (2009); Carolyn and Campbell Rose (2009–2014); Lindsay Arnold (2020–2023)
- Duration: 2007–2014; 2020–2023
- First appearance: October 23, 2007
- Last appearance: February 20, 2023
- Created by: Hogan Sheffer and Meg Kelly
- Introduced by: Ken Corday and Edward J. Scott; Ken Corday, Albert Alarr and Greg Meng (2020)
- Spin-off appearances: Days of Our Lives: A Very Salem Christmas (2021)
In-universe information
- Other names: Alice Caroline Horton; Chanel Dupree
- Parents: Lucas Horton; Sami Brady
- Siblings: Will Horton; Johnny DiMera; Sydney DiMera
- Children: Henry Horton
- Grandparents: Bill Horton; Kate Roberts; Roman Brady; Marlena Evans
- Aunts and uncles: Mike Horton; Jennifer Horton; Austin Reed; Billie Reed; Philip Kiriakis; Rex Brady; Cassie Brady; D.J. Craig; Carrie Brady Reed; Eric Brady; Belle Black; Brady Black (step)
- Nephews: Trey DiMera (adoptive)
- Nieces: Arianna Horton; Olivia DiMera
- First cousins: Jeremy Horton; Abigail Deveraux; JJ Deveraux; Chelsea Brady; Tyler Kiriakis; Claire Brady; Noah Reed; Emily Lockhart; Mackenzie Horton

Allie Horton is the daughter of Sami Brady and Lucas Horton. She and her twin, Johnny DiMera, are introduced on October 23, 2007, at her grandmother Marlena's house, where they are delivered by Marlena. Allie goes for several weeks without a name until the Thanksgiving Day wedding of Shawn and Belle, where Lucas announces her name as Alice Caroline Horton, and "Allie" for short. Sami is shocked because she and Lucas haven't yet reached a decision on their baby girl's name together, but happily Sami loves the name. Allie is named after her great-grandmothers, Alice Horton and Caroline Brady. Her twin, Johnny DiMera, is her maternal half-brother. Allie has a big brother in Will Horton, and in 2009, she becomes big sister to her new maternal half-sister, Sydney DiMera.

In February 2011, Allie goes to live in Hong Kong with her father Lucas for a while, after the man who is masquerading as her step-father Rafe Hernandez is mean to her several times. She returns after it is revealed that the man is an imposter. Sami and the real Rafe try to help Allie understand what has happened.

In May 2013, Allie becomes an aunt to Arianna Grace Horton (Will's daughter with Gabi Hernandez), and in April 2014 when Will gets married, Allie gains a brother-in-law in Sonny Kiriakis. In May 2014, Allie is walking into the Horton Town Square with Jordan Ridgeway when she sees her favorite cousin Nick Fallon, who has been shot multiple times and is bleeding from the chest, stumble into the square and collapse. Allie screams and is the first person to notice him. Afterwards, she cannot stop looking at him despite her parents' attempts to get her to look away; and when Nick dies shortly after, she is traumatized by his death. In October 2014, Allie moves with Sami, Johnny and Sydney, to live in California. A year later Sami takes them all on a round-the-world trip, and in the fall of 2017 the children stay with their Aunt Carrie and Uncle Austin in Switzerland.

In June 2020, a grown up Allie (Lindsay Arnold) returns to Salem, much to the surprise of Eric Brady (Greg Vaughan) and Nicole Walker (Arianne Zucker), where she reveals she is pregnant. After giving birth to son, Henry, she leaves town. When Sami sues Eric and Nicole for custody of her son, she returns much to the displeasure of her mother. Re-claiming her son, whom she names Henry, she moves back in with Nicole. Later, she discloses she was raped in London, and identifies Tripp Dalton (Lucas Adams) as her rapist and Henry's father. In December 2020, Charlie Dale (Mike C. Manning) discloses to his mother, Ava Vitali (Tamara Braun), that he was the one who raped Allie, not Tripp.

== Johnny DiMera ==
Johnny DiMera
- Days of Our Lives character
- Portrayed by: Ethan and Morgan Darling (2007); Mark Hapka (2007–2008 dream sequences); Ranger and Wiley Murphee (2008); Gabriel and Gideon Lala (2008); Jonathan and Jacob Velarde (2008); Aaron and Griffin Kunitz (2009–2014); Carson Boatman (2021–present); Dan Feuerriegel (2022); Brandon Barash (2022)
- Duration: 2007–2014; 2021–present
- First appearance: October 23, 2007
- Created by: Hogan Sheffer and Meg Kelly
- Introduced by: Ken Corday and Edward J. Scott (2007); Corday and Albert Alarr (2021)
- Spin-off appearances: Days of Our Lives: A Very Salem Christmas (2021)
In-universe information
- Other names: John Roman Horton; John Roman DiMera; Giovanni; EJ DiMera; Jake Lambert
- Occupation: Film producer; Socialite; Student
- Father: EJ DiMera
- Mother: Sami Brady
- Sisters: Sydney DiMera
- Half-brothers: Will Horton; Daniel DiMera
- Half-sisters: Allie Horton
- Spouse: Chanel Dupree (2021–2022, 2024–present)
- Sons: Trey DiMera (adoptive)
- Daughters: Olivia DiMera
- Grandfathers: Stefano DiMera; Roman Brady
- Grandmothers: Susan Banks; Marlena Evans
- Aunts and uncles: Renée DuMonde; Megan Hathaway; Kristen DiMera (adoptive); André DiMera; Peter Blake (adoptive); Lexie Carver; Benjy Hawk; Chad DiMera; D.J. Craig; Carrie Brady Reed; Eric Brady; Cassie Brady; Rex Brady; Belle Black; Stefan DiMera; Jake Lambert
- Nephews: Henry Horton
- Nieces: Arianna Horton
- First cousins: Theo Carver; Grace Brady; Claire Brady; Thomas DiMera; Steven Hawk; Noah Reed; Emily Lockhart; Charlotte DiMera; Rachel Black (adoptive); Mackenzie Horton

Johnny DiMera is the son of EJ DiMera and Sami Brady, and is the twin maternal half-brother of Allie Horton. Johnny is born with Allie on October 23, 2007. He is originally believed, like Allie, to be the son of Lucas Horton, but after the birth, EJ begins to suspect that the twins might have different fathers because Johnny does not look like his sister, and EJ thinks Johnny looks like himself. A second DNA test confirms EJ to be Johnny's father. With a full name of John Roman DiMera, Johnny is named after his mom's dad and step-dad, Roman Brady and John Black.

Johnny has an older maternal half-brother in Will Horton, and in 2009 he gains a full sister in Sydney DiMera. In 2013, Johnny becomes an uncle to Will's daughter Arianna Horton.

After witnessing a murder, Johnny's mom Sami is taken into protection by the federal government as a vulnerable witness. Whilst in witness protection, Sami allows Johnny to live with EJ and his wife Nicole Walker, in the DiMera mansion, with Johnny's paternal grandfather, Stefano DiMera. When Sami is released from witness protection, Johnny returns to live with Sami. However, Stefano insists that EJ raises Johnny as a DiMera, against Sami's wishes. EJ first resists this notion because he does not want to betray his ex-wife; but when he hears that Sami's youngest daughter, whom Sami says she adopted, is his daughter and that Sami gave birth to her whilst in witness protection and hid this from him, EJ is furious with Sami, and he agrees to raise Johnny as a DiMera against his ex-wife's wishes. After much heartache and drama, including Johnny suffering from eye-cancer (from which he eventually makes a full recovery), EJ and Sami become co-operative co-parents, and eventually marry again; but then Johnny's dad EJ is shot dead in a conflict with the villainous Clyde Weston.

After losing his dad, Johnny goes with his mom and sisters to live in Los Angeles. A year later Sami takes them all on a round-the-world trip, and in the fall of 2017 the children stay with their Aunt Carrie and Uncle Austin in Switzerland. Johnny reunited with his father in 2018 when his father EJ was revealed to be alive and then lived in Rome, Italy with his siblings and mother.

== Crawford Decker ==
Crawford Decker, played by John Sanderford (2007–08), was Ford Decker's father. He used his influence with the president of Salem University to protect Ford from being punished for raping several female students. Crawford also urged the police to aggressively pursue Ford's subsequent disappearance.

== Ford Decker ==
Ford Decker, played by Matthew Florida (2007), was a student at Salem University who was a serial date rapist. When his father Crawford, used his influence to protect Ford from being punished for drugging and raping numerous female students, the sisters of Alpha Chi Theta decided to take action. The women, who included three of Ford's victims or attempted victims, drugged him. When the partially incapacitated Ford then pursued Chelsea, whom he had also drugged, up the stairs of the sorority house, he lost consciousness and suffered a fatal fall down the stairs. The sisters buried his body in the basement. Subsequently, Chelsea Brady and Stephanie Johnson dug him back up and hid him in a water heater, which Max Brady removed from the premises.

== Maxine Landis ==
Maxine Landis is a fictional character from the NBC soap opera Days of Our Lives . She was portrayed by Aloma Wright from February 22, 2008, to May 29, 2015. Aloma previously made a one episode appearance as a nurse named Jillian in 2007.

Maxine is the head nurse at Salem's University Hospital. She often gets into the lives of the Salemites to offer a piece of advice. She played an instrumental role in helping to shape Melanie Jonas from a spoiled self-centered brat into a kind and compassionate woman, who eventually wanted to become a nurse. As a result, she and Melanie eventually became good friends. She has mentioned having two children in the past, a son and a daughter, with her husband Carl has died. She has been friends with Daniel Jonas and Jennifer Horton, and also dated Abe Carver.

== Daniel Jonas ==
Daniel Jonas
- Days of Our Lives character
- Portrayed by: Shawn Christian
- Duration: 2008–2017; 2020
- First appearance: March 4, 2008
- Last appearance: April 1, 2020
- Created by: Ken Corday and Edward J. Scott
In-universe information
- Other names: Daniel James Jonas
- Occupation: Physician
- Father: George Jonas (legal)
- Mother: Maggie Horton
- Adoptive mother: Lillian Parker Jonas
- Half-sisters: Summer Townsend; Melissa Horton (adoptive); Sarah Horton
- Wife: Rebecca Jonas; Chloe Lane (2010–11)
- Sons: Parker Jonas
- Daughters: Melanie Jonas; Holly Jonas
- Grandfathers: Elmer Simmons
- Grandmothers: Dorothy Simmons
- Nephews: Nathan Horton (adoptive)
- Nieces: Mackenzie Horton; Victoria Kiriakis

Daniel Jonas first appeared on March 4, 2008, being portrayed by actor, Shawn Christian. Christian initially signed a one-year contract, but he has since signed on for an extended stay. Following a fatal car crash caused by Eric Brady's drunk-driving, the character was written into a coma on January 4, 2016. On January 6, 2016, the character was killed off after being taken off life support when his heart was donated to Brady Black. Christian reprised the role thereafter during a dream sequence with Nicole Walker on February 12, 2016, during another dream sequence months later with Chloe Lane on November 3, 2016, and yet another dream sequence with Nicole Walker on December 12, 2016 - declaring his love for her as well as his encouragement for her to move on with her life. Christian made more reprisals in 2017, once on January 27, 2017, once in May 2017, and a final appearance as an apparition to Eric Brady and Nicole Walker on June 28, 2017. The character reappeared in a one-off guest appearance on April 1, 2020, for a special April Fools episode.

Before arriving in Salem, Dr. Jonas worked at various hospitals around the world. Many years ago, he had an affair with Carly Manning, who later introduced him to Rebecca, a cancer patient with whom Daniel fell in love. Although Rebecca's prognosis was grim, Daniel married her anyway and was determined to save her. Rebecca's cancer proved to be too advanced and she died in Daniel's arms. Upon his arrival in Salem, Daniel has romances with Chelsea Brady and her grandmother Kate Roberts. In early 2010, Carly tells Daniel that Melanie Layton is their daughter. Daniel and Melanie bond quickly, and eventually forgive Carly for keeping them apart. After a drunken one night stand with Melanie's husband, Philip Kiriakis, Daniel's fiancée Chloe Lane becomes pregnant, and is unsure if Daniel or Philip is the father. She is relieved when a paternity test shows Daniel as the child's father. Daniel and Chloe name their son Parker, after Daniel's mother. At Parker's christening, Caroline Brady reveals that she switched the paternity test to keep Melanie from leaving Philip for her granddaughter Stephanie Johnson's boyfriend Nathan Horton. Daniel ends his marriage to Chloe.

Daniel soon finds happiness with Jennifer Horton, but their happiness is short-lived as Jennifer's ex, Jack Deveraux returns to town. Eventually Jennifer reunites with Jack and Daniel finds comfort with a pregnant Nicole Walker. He also learns that Maggie Horton is his biological mother. Daniel helps Nicole fix her child's paternity test, claiming the baby is Rafe Hernandez's, even though it is EJ DiMera's. As Nicole grows attached to Daniel, Jack dies and Daniel and Jennifer reunite. Nicole loses her baby, but keeps it a secret, wanting to hold onto Daniel. When Nicole falls down the stairs after a fight with Jennifer, and gives birth to a stillborn son, she blames Jennifer. Eventually the truth comes out and Daniel and Jennifer once again reunite. EJ confronts Daniel for keeping his son away from him saying he will not retaliate because of Daniel's previous help with his other son Johnny but warns Daniel not to cross him again.

On January 7, 2013, Chloe returns to Salem with the news that Daniel is really Parker's father.

On December 31, 2015, Daniel and Brady Black are driving in car returning to the Basic Black launch of product line because Brady forgot a gift for Theresa, during this time Eric Brady decides to drive himself while being intoxicated causes a car crash which injures several major Salem Residents including, Daniel, Brady Black, Eric, and Jennifer Horton. On January 4, 2016, Daniel was pronounced dead to the injuries from the accident, as an organ donor, Kayla asks Maggie to allow for Daniel to donate his heart to either Eric or Brady. On January 6, 2016, Daniel is taken off life-support with Maggie's consent and his heart is donated to Brady Black.

On April 1, 2020, Daniel is revealed to be alive and comes back to Salem to resume his life with Nicole and get to know his daughter, Holly. He convinces Nicole to leave Eric and to marry him in a wedding ceremony that is being officiated by Abe Carver in Eric's apartment. Eric interrupts the wedding and reveals that Daniel is already married. Nicole becomes enraged and kicks Daniel out of the apartment. Later, in the town square, it is revealed that Daniel is married to Shelia Watkins. It is later revealed that this was a joke and part of the "April Fools Day" Show.

== Richard Baker ==
Richard Baker, played by John Callahan (2008–2010), is a doctor Nicole blackmails into posing as her OB/GYN while she fakes pregnancy after miscarrying her baby. Though he claims to have altruistic motives in the running of his free clinic, he's involved in shady black market baby brokering in order to pay off his substantial debts, a fact Nicole uses to her advantage. He frequently goes to Nicole for money in exchange for keeping her secret until he is murdered by men Stefano DiMera hires. Stefano also attempts to frame Rafe Hernandez for the murder. In his last futile efforts to tell Sami and Mia about the baby switch, he writes each of them a letter, both of which are destroyed by Nicole. However, it is discovered that he faked his death and later returns to Salem. He helps Hope, who under the influence of sleeping pills, mugs the men of Salem. He was caught and send to prison for helping Nicole switch babies and stealing money.

== Mia McCormick ==
Mia McCormick was played by Taylor Spreitler from January 6, 2009, to June 23, 2010. Mia is a high school drop-out, who was introduced as a pregnant teenager. Nicole Walker buys her baby, Grace, for $10K to replace her own, secretly miscarried, baby. Nicole then secretly swaps Grace for Sami Brady's baby, Sydney, who was born at the same time (January 28, 2009). Mia uses the money to fund a dancing career in Japan but when this fails she returns to Salem, determined to get her baby back. On arriving in Salem, she moves in with Maggie Horton and she befriends Maggie's grand-nephew, Will Horton. Will is Sami Brady's firstborn, and they babysit Will's new baby sister Grace together, without Mia realizing Grace is her own daughter. Mia is attracted to Will and they date. Mia works at Java Cafe, where she meets and re-connects with her ex-boyfriend Chad DiMera, whom she left when she discovered she was pregnant. After overhearing information and investigating, Chad discovers that Mia had a baby, and realizes it is his. Nicole pressurizes Mia to keep their deal secret, but Chad wants to know what happened to his daughter, and he eventually learns that Mia gave their daughter away to Nicole. In the meantime, Grace contracts bacterial meningitis, and she dies, leaving Will and Sami devastated. It is only afterwards that Mia finds out about the baby-swap: that Grace was her biological daughter. Shocked and devastated, Mia and Chad mourn Grace.

== Grace Brady ==
Grace Brady
- Days of Our Lives character
- Portrayed by: Maggie and Bebe Vose (2009); Ava and Grace Greeson (2009); Lily and Sophie Gimbel (2009); Ailish and Julia O'Connor (2009)
- First appearance: January 27, 2009
- Last appearance: July 27, 2009
- Created by: Dena Higley and Christopher Whitesell
- Introduced by: Ken Corday and Gary Tomlin
In-universe information
- Other names: Grace Rafaela Brady; Grace DiMera; Grace McCormick-Woods
- Family: DiMera, Brady (legal)
- Parents: Chad DiMera; Mia McCormick
- Half-brothers: Thomas DiMera
- Half-sisters: Charlotte DiMera
- Grandparents: Stefano DiMera; Madeline Peterson Woods
- Uncles: Andre DiMera; Peter Blake (adoptive); Benjy Hawk; EJ DiMera; Stefan DiMera; Jake Lambert
- Aunts: Renée DuMonde; Megan Hathaway; Kristen DiMera (adoptive); Lexie Carver
- Nieces: Arianna Horton (legal)
- First cousins: Steven Hawk; Theo Carver; Johnny DiMera; Sydney DiMera; Rachel Black (adoptive); Mackenzie Horton (legal)

Grace Brady is the biological daughter of a young teenage mother, Mia McCormick and her ex-boyfriend Chad DiMera, then Peterson-Woods, born on-screen on January 27, 2009, but she was believed to be the biological daughter of EJ DiMera and Sami Brady. It wasn't until November 12, 2009, when Rafe Hernandez revealed the truth that Sami Brady knew she wasn't Grace's birth mother.

Sami Brady and Nicole Walker were both pregnant with EJ DiMera's babies. Nicole miscarried but pretended to still be pregnant. She planned to adopt Mia McCormick's baby and pass it off as hers with E.J. When Mia and Sami gave birth to girls on the same day, in the same medical clinic, almost at the same time, Nicole switched Sami's baby with Mia's baby (Nicole helped deliver Mia's baby), so that she and E.J. would raise a child that was biologically his.

Sami, who was forced to enter the witness protection program during her pregnancy, decided to protect her child from the DiMeras by never telling E.J. about their baby. As a result, she temporarily left Grace at a convent orphanage. On March 30, 2009, Sami brought Grace home to Salem telling everybody she was her "adopted" daughter. The same day she bestowed Rafe, her bodyguard-turned-boyfriend, Grace's godfather. The baby was christened Grace Rafaela; Grace in honor of the convent and what Sami perceived as God's intervention in helping her to have and keep her baby, and Rafaela in honor of Rafe.

Grace died on June 9, 2009, from bacterial meningitis. Grace's parents, Sami Brady and Rafe Hernandez, were at her bedside when she died. She had also been held on that day by her biological mother, Mia. On June 11, 2009, Sami revealed to E.J. that he was "Grace's biological father," still unaware that the baby she had raised was not genetically theirs.

== Sydney DiMera ==
Sydney DiMera
- Days of Our Lives character
- Portrayed by: Avery and Cade Seger (2009); Hailey and Lauren Sinnema (2009–10); Elizabeth and Mariam Tovey (2010–11); Isabelle and Sahara Roberts (2011–12); Nadia and Talia Hartounian (2013–14); Berlyn and Brooklyn Baca (2014); Evelyn Stephenson (2021); Sydney Malakeh (since 2026)
- Duration: 2009–2014; 2021; 2026
- First appearance: January 28, 2009
- Created by: Dena Higley and Christopher Whitesell
- Introduced by: Ken Corday and Gary Tomlin; Ken Corday and Noel Maxam (2026)
- Spin-off appearances: Days of Our Lives: A Very Salem Christmas (2021)
In-universe information
- Occupation: Lawyer
- Family: Brady, DiMera
- Father: EJ DiMera
- Mother: Sami Brady
- Brothers: Johnny DiMera
- Half-brothers: Will Horton; Daniel DiMera
- Half-sisters: Allie Horton
- Grandfathers: Stefano DiMera; Roman Brady
- Grandmothers: Susan Banks; Marlena Evans
- Aunts and uncles: Renée DuMonde; Megan Hathaway; Kristen DiMera (adoptive); André DiMera; Peter Blake (adoptive); Lexie Carver; Benjy Hawk; Chad DiMera; D.J. Craig; Carrie Brady Reed; Eric Brady; Cassie Brady; Rex Brady; Belle Brady; Stefan DiMera; Jake Lambert
- Nieces and nephews: Arianna Horton; Henry Horton; Trey DiMera (adoptive); Olivia DiMera
- First cousins: Theo Carver; Grace Brady; Claire Brady; Thomas DiMera; Steven Hawk; Noah Reed; Emily Lockhart; Charlotte DiMera; Rachel Black (adoptive); Mackenzie Horton

Sydney DiMera is the daughter of EJ DiMera and Sami Brady. Sydney was introduced on January 28, 2009, while her mother is in witness protection, and she is switched shortly after birth with Grace Brady, the daughter of a teenage mother, Mia, who has agreed to give her baby up for adoption to Nicole Walker, who has miscarried her fiancé E.J.'s daughter. Nicole has arranged in secret to adopt Mia's baby and pass the child off as E.J.'s, fearful that she would lose EJ without a baby.

When Nicole learns that Sami had just recently given birth to her and E.J.'s daughter the same day Mia gave birth to hers, Nicole switches the babies, preferring to have E.J.'s biological daughter over an unrelated child. Nicole instantly bonds with Sydney, and vows to always protect her no matter what happens. Sami and E.J. are none the wiser to Nicole's treachery, and Sami and Rafe bond with "Sami's" daughter, Grace, while EJ and Nicole bond with "their" daughter.

Shortly after Grace dies of meningitis, E.J. learns that Nicole had a miscarriage with their daughter and he kicks Nicole and Sydney out of the mansion, not knowing the truth about Sydney. Eventually, Sami also learns that Sydney is her biological daughter. Soon after, E.J. learns that Sydney is his biological child with Sami. However, the family reunion turns into a nightmare when Brady Black bails Nicole out of jail and she kidnaps Sydney. Nicole has a change of heart and decides to tell E.J. and Sami where Sydney is, but she is knocked out by Anna DiMera, who takes Sydney. It is later revealed that Anna was hired by E.J. to kidnap Sydney.

Sydney becomes the subject of many custody battles between E.J. and Sami over the next few years, with Nicole involved, as well, during the time she is married to E.J. They later come to an agreement, though, and Sydney is able to stay with her entire family, including her siblings, Johnny, Allie Horton, and Will Horton. Sydney became an aunt when Gabi Hernandez gave birth to Will's daughter, Arianna Horton. Sydney became an aunt for the second time, when her sister Allie gave birth to her son, Henry Horton. Then Sydney later became an aunt for the third and fourth time, when her brother Johnny adopted his son, Trey DiMera and welcomed his daughter, Olivia DiMera. In 2026, it was revealed that Sydney had earned her law degree and her MBA.

== Nathan Horton ==
Nathan Horton
- Days of Our Lives character
- Portrayed by: Mark Hapka
- Duration: 2009–11
- First appearance: June 18, 2009
- Last appearance: May 17, 2011
In-universe information
- Occupation: Physician
- Family: Horton
- Mother: Melissa Horton
- Grandparents: Jim Philips; Linda Patterson; Mickey Horton (adoptive); Maggie Horton (adoptive)
- Aunts and uncles: Summer Townsend (adoptive); Daniel Jonas (adoptive); Sarah Horton (adoptive)
- First cousins: Melanie Jonas (adoptive); Parker Jonas (adoptive); Holly Jonas (adoptive) Mackenzie Horton (adoptive)

Nathan Horton, portrayed by Mark Hapka, is a doctor who came to Salem in June 2009 to start an internship at Salem University Hospital. He is the son of Melissa Horton; his father has never been identified. On his first day at the hospital, he meets Melanie Layton, and they start a flirtation. Later, Melanie is surprised and alarmed when she returns home to Maggie Horton's house to find a half-dressed Nathan, fresh out of the shower, as she hadn't yet learned that he is Maggie's grandson; Maggie soon arrives and explains that Nathan would be living there. When Nathan learns that Melanie was the girl his cousin Nick Fallon had been involved with, he blames her for ruining Nick's life and speaks harshly to her about it. When Maggie informs Nathan that Melanie had been Nick's victim and that she spoke on his behalf in court, Nathan apologizes to Melanie and she accepts. He moves into Lucas's house after learning Maggie feels uncomfortable with him and Melanie dating while living under the same roof.

== See also ==
- List of Days of Our Lives characters
- List of Days of Our Lives characters (1960s)
- List of Days of Our Lives characters (1970s)
- List of Days of Our Lives characters (1980s)
- List of Days of Our Lives characters (1990s)
- List of Days of Our Lives characters (2010s)
- List of Days of Our Lives characters (2020s)
- List of Days of Our Lives cast members
- List of previous Days of Our Lives cast members
