= Mimi Lockhart =

- Days of Our Lives character
- Farah Fath Galfond as Mimi Lockhart
- Portrayed by: Doren Fein (1999); Kelly Cohen (1999); Farah Fath (1999–2018); Teressa Liane (2019–20)
- Duration: 1999–2007; 2018–20
- First appearance: August 17, 1999
- Last appearance: January 16, 2020
- Created by: Sally Sussman Morina
- Introduced by: Ken Corday and Tom Langan (1999); Ken Corday, Albert Alarr and Greg Meng (2018)
- Spin-off appearances: Last Blast Reunion (2019)
In-universe information
- Other names: Miriam Elizabeth Lockhart; Mimi Brady
- Parents: David Lockhart; Bonnie Lockhart
- Siblings: Patrick Lockhart; Conner Lockhart
- Husband: Shawn-Douglas Brady (2006–07)
- Children: Tyler Kiriakis; Emily Lockhart
- Aunts: Calista Lockhart

Mimi Lockhart is a fictional character from Days of Our Lives. Mimi was portrayed by Doren Fein from August 17 to 19, 1999. The character is most recognized as played by actress Farah Fath who played the role from September 16, 1999, to March 1, 2007. In May 2018, it was revealed that Fath would be returning to the show after an 11-year absence. Fath resumed the role on October 5, 2018, and departed a month later on November 6. In November 2019, it was announced that Teressa Liane had been cast in the role of Mimi for the digital series "Last Blast Reunion".

== Storylines ==
=== Backstory ===
Mimi's childhood was marred by the abusive behaviour of her father, David, which not only affected her but also led to her brother Patrick leaving the home. David's attacks on Mimi and Bonnie were a constant source of trauma for them. Mimi looked after her younger brother, Connor until he also moved away at a young age.

=== 1999–2007 ===
Mimi had a close friendship with Belle Black (Kirsten Storms) since kindergarten. Mimi was jealous of Belle's new friendship with Chloe Lane (Nadia Bjorlin) and began working with Jan Spears to cast Chloe as a social outcast. Jan preyed on Mimi's insecurities and used them to torment Chloe, including taking naked pictures of her in the shower. Mimi then developed a crush on Shawn-Douglas Brady (Jason Cook, later Brandon Beemer), but he was interested in Belle. Shawn agrees to take both Belle and Mimi to the dance after Mimi gets down on bended knee to beg Shawn to take her. Jan's hatred for Chloe intensifies, and Jan uses Mimi to sneak the photos of Chloe into the slide projector, to humiliate Chloe whilst also advertising their website, operagirl.net. The prank almost put Mimi in jail, but instead, she is forced to spend her senior year at Salem High cleaning bathrooms as her punishment.

Mimi's friends start to notice her odd behavior, which includes staying away from them and roaming the streets at night. Chloe is the first to discover that Mimi and her family are homeless. Her father had been laid off and was supposedly out of town searching for work. Mimi's friends rally together and build a Habitat for Humanity house for the Lockhart family.

During the summer of 2001, Mimi joins her classmates on a trip to Puerto Rico to study the environment. She and Belle become close again, but she becomes even closer to geeky Kevin Lambert, and the two nearly have sex on the island. With her newfound self-esteem, Mimi becomes determined to do the right thing and make up with Chloe. Chloe and Mimi join forces to help Belle and Shawn get back together. She accomplishes that task, along with high school graduation, and spends the summer with Kevin. However, they broke up at the end of the summer as he goes away to college.

Mimi starts the following year at Salem University with Belle. Mimi eventually gets together with Rex Brady (Eric Winter) but fears he might be the Salem Stalker: the serial killer who had supposedly killed several residents, including Rex's sister, Cassie Brady (Alexis Thorpe) (eventually, it is revealed that all of the victims, including Cassie, are alive). Rex suffers from massive headaches and mood swings, and at one point, accidentally kills Wilhelm Rolf (William Utay), Rex's "creator." After this ordeal, the couple is solid until Mimi finds out she is pregnant. Mimi's insecurities return, and she convinces herself that she has a good relationship with Rex and that it will be ruined with a baby. Mimi makes the heartbreaking decision to have an abortion without telling Rex. Due to a resulting infection, Mimi is rendered sterile.

Jan returns to Salem, and Mimi learns she has been keeping Shawn hostage at her country home. Before Mimi could expose Jan, Jan blackmails her about the abortion. Jan trips and hits her head on a rock while arguing with Mimi and ends up in a serious condition in the hospital. Mimi is arrested for pushing Jan and is sentenced to jail. Rex and Patrick manage to get their hands on a video clearing Mimi's name just in time, and she is released. Mimi's guilt over her lies to Rex starts to get unbearable, but her mother, Bonnie Lockhart (Judi Evans), convinces her to keep quiet and hold on to her man.

Rex overhears an argument between Belle (now Martha Madison) and Mimi and learns that Mimi had aborted his child without ever telling him that she was pregnant. He breaks up with her and leaves Salem. Mimi is devastated and blames Belle for ruining her life. Mimi grows closer with her new roommate and high school crush, Shawn, who is no longer with Belle. After the birth of Belle's daughter, Claire Brady (she is originally believed to be Phillip's daughter, but is actually the daughter of Shawn), Mimi attempts to mend fences with Belle. After months of escalating romance, Shawn proposes to Mimi on New Year's Eve and they get married in March 2006.

Mimi does everything she can to keep Shawn and Belle apart because she fears that they will fall in love again. Mimi and Shawn go through the IVF process and Mimi becomes pregnant in May 2006. That June, Mimi, and Belle are out shopping when Mimi starts to have cramps. Lexie Carver tells Shawn, Belle, and Philip Kiriakis, Belle's husband, that Mimi has miscarried. Mimi is truly devastated and Shawn sticks by her. They decide to ask a surrogate to carry their child, but a mix-up in the lab causes Mimi's egg to be fertilized with Philip's sperm and Belle's egg with Shawn's sperm; the EJ DiMera is responsible for this mix-up as part of his crusade to ruin the lives of the people in Salem. Mimi knows that Shawn was the father of Belle's baby and doesn't tell anyone. When the truth is finally revealed, Shawn leaves Mimi and they get a divorce. She and Philip sign away their rights to their baby to the surrogate, Lauren.

Mimi moves back home to the Lockhart House with Bonnie and Conner. Mimi briefly works at Chez Rouge but leaves after a fight with Shawn's girlfriend, Willow Stark. Mimi then gets a job working for Max Brady at his garage. Max and her grow close as they look for Philip who's missing. Victor Kiriakis's goons hold them hostage in a church basement where they share their first kiss and also discover a skeleton. Mimi and Max began to date, much to Abigail Deveraux's dismay. Mimi gets in the way of Phillip's search for Claire after Shawn and Belle take her into hiding. Max rescues Mimi and they help Shawn and Belle flee to Canada.

The skeleton is revealed to be David Lockhart, Mimi's father. Max comforts Mimi through this misery, but it is Bonnie who is able to give Mimi the answers she is looking for. Bonnie explains that Mimi killed her father but suppressed the memories because David used to abuse the family. Instead of letting her daughter take the blame, Bonnie goes to jail. With her mother and older brother both in prison, Mimi leaves to live with her younger brother, Connor, in Arizona.

=== 2018 ===
Mimi returns to Salem in October 2018 to assist her mother, who is using Mimi's daughter as her own. It is revealed that Rex (now Kyle Lowder) slept with Mimi despite being in a relationship with Sarah Horton (Linsey Godfrey), which resulted in Mimi giving birth to Emily Lockhart. Bonnie passes the child off as her own and pretends that she is her daughter with Lucas Horton (Bryan Dattilo), whom she slept with whilst impersonating Lucas' girlfriend, Adrienne Kiriakis (also Judi Evans). Eventually the truth comes out, leading to the break up of Rex and Sarah's engagement. During Mimi's return, she reunites with Shawn, Belle and Chloe. Mimi leaves town the following month.
