= Chelsea Brady =

- Days of our Lives character
- Rachel Melvin as Chelsea Brady
- Portrayed by: Mandy Musgrave (2004–2005); Rachel Melvin (2005–2023)
- Duration: 1998; 2004–2009; 2023
- First appearance: May 22, 1998
- Last appearance: September 7, 2023
- Created by: Sally Sussman Morina (Note: The birth/presumed death of Bo and Billie's child was shown in 1998, under executive producers Ken Corday and Tom Langan and head writer Sally Sussman Morina. The character was later developed and introduced under executive producers, Corday and Stephen Wyman and head writer, James E. Reilly.)
- Introduced by: Ken Corday and Stephen Wyman (2004); Corday and Albert Alarr (2023)
In-universe information
- Other names: Georgia Reed Brady; Chelsea Benson; Chelsea Reed
- Occupation: Student
- Family: Brady; Roberts; Kiriakis
- Parents: Bo Brady; Billie Reed
- Half-brothers: Shawn-Douglas Brady; Zack Brady
- Half-sisters: Ciara Brady
- Spouse: Max Brady (2009-present)
- Children: Isaac Brady
- Grandparents: Victor Kiriakis; Caroline Brady; Shawn Brady (legal); Curtis Reed; Kate Roberts
- Aunts and uncles: Isabella Toscano; Roman Brady; Kimberly Brady; Kayla Brady Johnson; Frankie Brady (adoptive); Max Brady (adoptive); Xander Kiriakis; Philip Kiriakis; Austin Reed; Lucas Horton; Cassie Brady; Rex Brady
- Nieces and nephews: Claire Brady; Bo Brady-Weston; Addie Weston
- First cousins: Brady Black; Carrie Brady Reed; Eric Brady; Sami Brady; Cassie Brady; Rex Brady; Andrew Donovan IV; Theresa Donovan; Stephanie Johnson; Joey Johnson; Will Horton; Allie Horton; Victoria Kiriakis; Tyler Kiriakis; Noah Reed; Emily Lockhart

Chelsea Brady is a fictional character on the NBC soap opera Days of Our Lives. Created by head writer Sally Sussman Morina, the role was originally played by Mandy Musgrave. The role was recast with Rachel Melvin in 2005. Melvin portrayed the character from 2005 to 2009, after the character moves to London to take care of her mother, Billie Reed. She is the child of Bo Brady and Billie Reed. Chelsea is born by the name of Georgia Reed Brady. "Georgia" is presumed dead, and buried in a bayou in Louisiana. In 2005 after Chelsea Benson's parents are killed in a car accident, DNA tests show that she is Georgia Reed Brady.

Melvin reprised the role on September 7, 2023, as part of a memorial episode dedicated to John Aniston's Victor Kiriakis.

== Storylines ==
Chelsea Brady is born onscreen as Georgia Reed Brady on May 22, 1998, in Louisiana. Chelsea is the long-lost daughter of Billie Reed and Bo Brady, who is initially buried in the bayou as Georgia Reed Brady in May 1998. The truth comes out when Chelsea's illegally adoptive parents are killed in a car accident and blood tests reveal her true lineage. Billie immediately steps in to care for Chelsea. In 2006, Chelsea changes her last name to Brady, her biological father's last name.

As Abigail Deveraux's best friend, Chelsea is a bad influence. She encourages Abby to smoke, drink, and lie often to her mother. She also has a few driving incidents, including having her license revoked. Of course, the most serious accident results in the death of Zack Brady — her half-brother, whom she hits while she is text messaging and driving simultaneously, thus incurring the wrath of Hope Brady and half-brother Shawn Brady.

Chelsea is involved with Max Brady, who keeps Chelsea's secret about accidentally killing Zack. Chelsea is also obsessed with older men including Patrick Lockhart, who is conveniently staying at Abby's house. Seeing Billie Reed as her biggest competition, Chelsea hates her, that is, until she learned that Billie is actually her mother.

After all the bad things Chelsea does, she desperately wants to change. While serving her community service at the hospital, a gloved hand leaves a file for Chelsea to discover. The file says that Claire Brady is not her cousin, the daughter of Philip Kiriakis, but actually her half-niece, Shawn's daughter. Thinking she is doing the right thing, Chelsea leaves the file in Shawn's cubicle for him to find while he lies unconscious from alcohol poisoning. She feels letting him know he is Claire's father will give him a reason to live.

Belle and Shawn discover the file when he wakes up and they think the file is fraudulent because they do not remember sleeping together. The file is dusted for fingerprints and it is discovered that, apart from Shawn and Belle, Chelsea's are the only other fingerprints on the file. Bo arrests Chelsea, and Max blows up when he finds out, immediately dumping her. Bo decides that the only way to prove that Chelsea is guilty is to run the DNA test on Shawn to see if he is Claire's biological father. The tests come back positive and, in this turn of events, the charges are dropped.

Chelsea then goes on a quest to get Bo and Billie back together, and consults the help of her grandmother, Kate Roberts, who encourages Chelsea to be driven and go after what she wants. The stress of losing their child has torn apart Bo and Hope and when Hope sends e-mails to Bo expressing her desire for a divorce, Chelsea intercepts the emails and writes back pretending to be Bo and agrees to the divorce even though Bo is trying to get back together with Hope. When her actions are discovered, Bo and Hope are completely enraged and Bo disown Chelsea. After many weeks of feeling guilty she talks to her father and with the support of her mother, Billie, she is able to gain back her father's trust and he welcomes her back into his life.

Chelsea is then involved with a mystery lover online by the name of Dr. Shane Patten. She tells him all her feelings and her deepest secrets thinking she can trust him. She even goes so far as to plan their future together. She gets so into him she wants all the details about him so she gets Abby's cousin, Nick Fallon, to find everything out for her. After giving up on Nick finding out information about Patten because Nick won't talk to her, Chelsea finally learns that Dr. Patten is really Nick all along and he is just trying to get her to like him. She is upset and hurt at Nick's actions and completely ends their friendship, saying she can never trust him again.

Things became even worse between the two when Chelsea finds out that Nick had slept with her mother when she was drunk and he is depressed over the loss of Chelsea's friendship. She refuses to even be in the same room as Nick and moves out of her mother's house and moves in with her father and stepmother. Her mother desperately tries to repair their relationship, but there still remains some tension between the two.

Chelsea finds even more problems when her father's house is set on fire. The fire is actually started by Willow Stark, a former prostitute and ex-girlfriend of Shawn Brady, who is hired by EJ DiMera to break into the house. The fire is started unintentionally and Willow places a hairbrush of Chelsea's in the house to try to frame her for the fire. Chelsea panics at what her father would think considering her past troubles and under the pretense of wanting to rebuild their relationship she convinces Nick, a DNA assistant, to steal the brush in order to keep her father from finding out. Nick feels extremely guilty over his actions and is not completely sure if she is telling the truth about the fire and visits Willow in jail (she is arrested for stealing Hope's jewelry) to try to figure out which version of the fire story is true. Willow steals the hairbrush from Nick, which results in Nick trying to get the hairbrush back. Willow dies struggling to get the hairbrush back from Nick. Afterwards, Chelsea admits to her father that she asked Nick to steal the hairbrush from the lab.

It is believed that Chelsea truly does have romantic feelings for Nick, but due to past relationships she has trouble trusting people and has found it hard to forgive Nick, but Nick has stated that he is determined to prove to Chelsea he loves her no matter what it takes together. Chelsea and Nick bond after Chelsea is kidnapped on the campus of Salem University, with Max also stopping a bomb from going off that is strapped to her body in exchange for Atermis and DeMarquette.

Then, Chelsea goes on to help have Ford Decker arrested for the rape of her two good friends Cordy and Morgan. Chelsea is not aware that Stephanie was also raped by Ford and ignores Stephanie's pleas to let Ford be.

Chelsea and the girls create posters depicting Ford as a rapist and are threatened by him on several occasions, the latest being at the Brady Pub where Nick is forced to defend her.

In November, Chelsea and Nick break into Ford's dorm to obtain proof that he is indeed the campus rapist. They have pictures that are illegally obtained. Chelsea's father Bo and Stephanie's father Steve are forced to confront Ford. After being appalled by the university's unwillingness to do anything to Ford, the girls lure him into their sorority house where Chelsea pretends to be interested in him. The girls drug his drink but Ford switches the drinks and Chelsea ends up drugged. In a fight on the stairs, Ford falls backwards and dies. The girls, with the help of Max Brady, bury Ford in the basement of the house.

Chelsea's father Bo Brady is later admitted to the hospital for pancreatic issues. Chelsea is found to be a match and is scheduled for an experimental operation to graft some of her pancreas to save Bo. Bo's handsome and earth-friendly doctor, Dr. Daniel Jonas, (who is brought in by Victor Kiriakis) performs the surgery. He and Chelsea grew to become friends and their friendship turned into an attraction that went beyond "just friends". However Daniel fought it at first. He was older, she was his patient at one point, and he was still mourning his late wife, for which he blamed himself for her death. However, he decided follow his heart with Chelsea and they started dating. Unfortunately, the happiness did not last as Chelsea found out that Daniel had slept with her grandmother Kate before they started dating. Chelsea broke up with Daniel.

Kate Roberts, her grandmother, and Dr. Jonas become involved as he treats her for lung cancer.

Afterwards, she begins defending Nick Fallon, her "first love," who is charged with Trent Robbins murder, and growing closer to her old flame, Max Brady, whom she kissed at New years dinner at Chez Rouge, suggesting that they may get back together. Max and Chelsea spend a lot more time together and old feelings come back. They both realize that they are in love with each other and that they need to be together now. Chelsea also volunteers at the hospital, where she establishes a connection with Abe and Lexie's son, Theo.

Chelsea goes to England to be with her mom after Billie is involved in a car accident. She later returns to Salem and announces that she will be staying in London. She reunites with Max and they get engaged. They decide to leave Salem and move to London. She returns to Salem in 2023 for Victor Kiriakis' memorial, revealing she and Max have a son, Isaac.
