= Rachel Melvin =

American actress (born 1985)

- Born: February 9, 1985 (age 41); Elmhurst, Illinois, U.S.
- Education: Mountain Pointe High School
- Occupation: Actress
- Years active: 2004–2018, 2023
- Spouse: Kevin Barrett (m. 2022)

Rachel Melvin (born February 9, 1985) is an American actress. She is best known for her roles as Chelsea Brady on Days of Our Lives (2005–2009, 2023) and as Penny in Dumb and Dumber To.

== Early life and education ==
Melvin was born in Elmhurst, Illinois, but moved to Phoenix, Arizona, at age four, where she was raised. She has an older sister named Jessica. She graduated from Mountain Pointe High School in 2003. Melvin passed up a full scholarship to college so that she could move to California to pursue an acting career. In Los Angeles, she took acting classes every weekend.

== Career ==
Melvin landed her first acting job in the 2005 independent film Boo. She later won the role of Georgia LaMarque, a French girl whom Bo and Billie had been falsely led to believe was their daughter on the NBC soap opera Days of our Lives, but only appeared in five episodes. Months later, she took over the role of Chelsea Brady (originally portrayed by Mandy Musgrave). She and her dog were seen on The Tonight Show with Jay Leno, when she was randomly interviewed at a gas station for a segment. Melvin has also guest-starred on Summerland, Jack & Bobby and 8 Simple Rules. With her family, she has also appeared on Family Feud.

In 2010, Melvin starred as Kaia in Seven Deadly Sins which premiered on Lifetime alongside Dreama Walker. The first part premiered on May 23 while the second part premiered on May 24, 2010. In 2011, Melvin appeared in episodes of House M.D. and Castle.

In 2014, Melvin appeared as Penny Pinchelow in Dumb and Dumber To, portrayed Mary in Zombeavers, and Sarah in the drama thriller film Madtown.

She appeared in the final season of MTV's Awkward.

Melvin reprised the role of Chelsea Brady in August 2023 when she appeared for Victor Kiriakis' (John Aniston) funeral.

== Personal life ==
Melvin lives in Los Angeles, California. Her idols include Meryl Streep, Mary-Louise Parker, Anne Hathaway, Cynthia Nixon and Toni Collette. She is married to Kevin Barrett.

== Filmography ==
=== Film ===
Year	Film	Role	Notes
2005	Boo	Meg	Film debut
2008	Legacy	Julie	Direct-to-video; also known as Pretty Little Devils
2009	Cry of the Mummy	Le Petit Sirene Agent	
2010	Girlfriend	Rebecca	
2010	Seven Deadly Sins	Kaia	Two-part film
2012	My Funny Valentine	Stevie	
2014	Dumb and Dumber To	Penny Pinchelow	
2014	Zombeavers	Mary	Direct-to-DVD
2014	All I Need	Ashley	
2015	Backup Boyfriend	Celia	
2015	Madtown	Sarah	
2017	Sleepwalker	Dawn	
2017	The Trouble With Mistletoe	Willa Davis	
2018	The Rake	Nicole	

=== Television ===
Year	Film	Role	Notes
2004	Summerland	Teen Girl	1 episode
2005	8 Simple Rules	Cute Girl	1 episode
2005–09, 2023	Days of Our Lives	Chelsea Brady	522 episodes
2006	Heroes	Annie	3 episodes
2011	House	Wynn Phillips	1 episode
2011	Castle	Nicole Hixton	1 episode
2012	Good Luck Charlie	Syd (hairdresser)	1 episode
2015	Bones	Kate Kolfax	1 episode
2016	Awkward.	Lizzie	Recurring; 7 episodes
2017	Sleepy Hollow	Alex Norwood	Main; 13 episodes
