= Bo Brady and Hope Williams =

Bo and Hope
- Peter Reckell and Kristian Alfonso as Bo and Hope
- Duration: 1983–1990, 1994–2015, 2022–present
- Introduced by: Betty Corday and Al Rabin
In-universe information
- Other names: Bope
- Spouse: 1985–1995, 2000–2014, 2025-present
- Children: Shawn-Douglas Brady; Zack Brady; Ciara Brady
- Grandchildren: Claire Brady; Beauregard “Bo” Weston; Adelaide "Addie" Weston

Beauregard "Bo" Brady and Hope Williams Brady are fictional characters and the signature supercouple on the American daytime drama Days of Our Lives. Bo is portrayed by Peter Reckell and Hope is portrayed by Kristian Alfonso. On internet message boards, the couple is often referred by the portmanteau "Bope" (for Bo and Hope). Along with General Hospital's Luke and Laura Spencer, Bo and Hope are considered to be one of daytime television's most iconic couples.

== Storyline ==
Bo Brady and Hope Williams changed the face of daytime when rebel Bo came riding into town on his motorcycle in 1983 and fell for the rich and feisty Hope Williams, whom he later nicknamed Fancy Face.

One of the most momentous occasions in the couple's history involved the moment when Bo kidnapped Hope from her wedding to sly politician Larry Welch. Bo and Hope rode off together on Bo's motorcycle, while Bo's friend Howie stood in for the bride. Unfortunately, Larry's goons kidnapped Hope and she was forced to marry him anyway after Larry threatened her family. Hope then spent most of the summer of 1984 trapped in a loveless marriage to Larry, but was successfully able to keep the marriage from being consummated by claiming that she was pregnant with Bo's child (Hope was in fact still a virgin at this point as her and Bo's previous attempts to have sex had been interrupted). Hope met Bo in secret and reaffirmed that her love was for him. Eventually Bo and Hope had sex in an old plantation in New Orleans and shortly thereafter Hope was able to escape from Larry's clutches (though he would seek revenge in 2002).

Bo and Hope are also known for their adventures. From England to New York, they were no conventional couple. Bo and Hope's royal wedding on location in England was one of the most spectacular weddings on daytime television. Hope's dress cost around $35,000.

In their many years on the show, the couple has survived plenty of tragedy, including Hope's identity crisis when she was temporarily brainwashed by Stefano DiMera to think she was a princess, and Bo's struggle to find his daughter, Georgia. They are the parents of Shawn-Douglas Brady, Zack Brady and Ciara Brady. Bo Brady and Billie Reed's daughter, Georgia, whom they believed to be stillborn, was found to be alive as Salem's teenage bad girl Chelsea Brady.

The supercouple's strength was tested with the loss of their middle child, Zack, who was taken off life support after a hit and run accident caused by Chelsea. Many fans were supportive of both the realistic storyline and Kristian Alfonso's depiction of a mother losing a child.

As a result of the accident, Hope pushed Bo away, blaming him for Chelsea's actions and getting her out of legal trouble. Once Hope learned that Bo had nothing to do with the evidence against Chelsea disappearing, the two seemed to be reconnecting. However, when new evidence was found exonerating Patrick, Hope couldn't believe she allowed Bo to pit her against Patrick.

Hope found out she was pregnant, with what she thought was Patrick's child; the baby was actually Bo's and Patrick had the results changed. Even with this, Bo and Hope continued to grow closer and soon fell back in love over Christmas. Patrick realized this and soon kidnapped Hope and took her to an abandoned warehouse where he planned to take her out of town. Unfortunately for Patrick, Bo soon found them right as Hope's water broke! Bo busted in and helped her deliver the new baby girl on December 29, 2006. Patrick then told Bo that he had bribed Hope's doctor into changing the test results to show that he was the father when Bo really was! Patrick went to jail and Bo and Hope went to the hospital with their "new miracle."

Bo and Hope currently live together with their new born daughter Ciara Brady, who got her name through a viewer vote. The lives of their other children, Shawn and Chelsea, had some rough patches, but is now looking up. Shawn was on the run with then ex-girlfriend Belle Black and their daughter Claire. Chelsea has gone through an ordeal after killing her half-brother Zack. She also has an up and down relationship with her boyfriend Nick Fallon.

After Bo faced a health crisis in March 2008, in which Chelsea saved his life by donating part of her pancreas, Bo started planning a surprise for Hope. On August 7, 2008, Bo and Hope renewed their vows in front of family and friends. Hope got a new wedding ring, since she threw the other one in the ocean in 2006 in a fit of anger, and Bo received Pop Shawn's old wedding ring. They separated briefly in 2010 when Hope was arrested, and Bo got back together with Carly. However, Carly dumped him after they saved Hope, realizing that Bo never stopped loving his wife. On October 30, 2012, Bo left town with his mother in order for her to undergo treatment for Alzheimers. Bo and Caroline returned to Salem a month later in November 2012; however, with portrayer Peter Reckell vacating the role earlier in the year, Bo has been reverted to an offscreen character, only being mentioned verbally by family and friends now.

Hope divorced Bo in September 2014, after not hearing from him for many months.

In November 2015, in celebration of Days' 50th Anniversary, Bo returned after being held captive. He broke free with friend Patch [Stephen Nichols], who searched to bring him back to Salem. On November 9, 2015, Bo returned home and saved Hope from being killed by her new husband, Aiden Jennings. Aiden was killed by Bo. Bo started not feeling well; he was getting headaches and blacking out. Bo was diagnosed with an inoperable brain tumor and didn't have much time to live. On November 20, 2015, Bo & Hope spent time in the park where they first met; Bo went pale and died in Hope's arms. It started snowing, making the vision from Caroline to be true.

== Cultural impact ==
The romantic pairing of Bo Brady and Hope Williams was nominated for "Most Irresistible Combination" at the 32nd Daytime Emmy Awards.

The pairing won the "America's Favorite Supercouple" award at the 2002 Emmy Awards.

In 2005, SOAPnet celebrated Days of our Lives 40th anniversary by airing a marathon of Bo and Hope episodes. Entertainment Weekly calls them one of the greatest supercouples.

In May 2009 Kristian Alfonso and Peter Reckell were invited to be international guests at the Australian Logie awards

Kristian Alfonso and Peter Reckell were the faces of Avon's Blue Rush perfume advertising campaign.

Alfonso and Reckell appeared in character on the NBC television series 30 Rock in the episode "Dealbreakers Talk Show#0001". They appeared in a scene airing on Liz Lemon's television and made comments about the titles from Liz's failed talk show appearing on a hospital TV.

== See also ==
- List of supercouples
