= Daphne Bloomer =

American actress

- Born: April 23, 1973 (age 52); Oklahoma City, Oklahoma, U.S.
- Education: University of California, Los Angeles (BA)
- Occupation: Actress
- Known for: Days of Our Lives

Daphne Bloomer (born April 23, 1973) is an American actress known for appearing on the soap opera Days of Our Lives.

== Early life and education ==
Bloomer was born and raised in Oklahoma City. She attended the University of Oklahoma for two weeks before deciding to pursue a career in acting. She relocated to Los Angeles, where she enrolled at the University of California, Los Angeles, earning a Bachelor of Arts degree in theatre.

== Career ==
Bloomer first appeared in the recurring role of Eugenia Willens on Days of our Lives April 8, 2002. Although the character was intended to appear in just two episodes, Bloomer ended up portraying the role until June 3, 2003, and returned October 12, 2004, to April 25, 2006. Bloomer also appeared in several stage productions, including The Tangled Snarl, a two-part play that featured other former and current (at the time) Days of our Lives actors.

== Filmography ==
=== Film ===
Year	Title	Role	Notes
2020	Sinister Savior	Rhonnie	

=== Television ===
Year	Title	Role	Notes
2002–2006	Days of Our Lives	Eugenia Willens	84 episodes
2003	Crossing Jordan	Nurse	Episode: "Family Ties"
2003	24	News Reporter	Episode: "Day 2: 11:00 p.m.-12:00 a.m."
2003	Strong Medicine	Cherisse	Episode: "Bad Liver"
2007	Greek	Jacqueline Singer	2 episodes
2010–2011	The Bay	Colleen Givens	6 episodes
2014	Nashville	Saleslady	Episode: "I'm Coming Home to You"
2019	Mad About You	Jennifer	Episode: "Real Estate for Beginners"
2019	Richard Lovely	Mom #2	Television film
2019, 2020	The L Word: Generation Q	Producer	2 episodes
2020	S.W.A.T.	Marshal Reid	Episode: "Gunpowder Treason"
2021	9-1-1	Mom	Episode: "Jinx"
2021	Good Girls	Delilah	Episode: "One Night in Bangkok"
2023	Your Honor	Aunt Sheila	3 episodes
