= Philip Kiriakis =

- Days of Our Lives character
- John-Paul Lavoisier as Philip Kiriakis
- Portrayed by: Brandon Tyler (1999); Jay Kenneth Johnson (1999–2002, 2007–2011, 2019–2021); Kyle Brandt (2003–2006); John-Paul Lavoisier (2015–2016, 2023–present); (and child actors)
- Duration: 1995–2011; 2015–2016; 2019–2021; 2023–present
- First appearance: February 21, 1995
- Created by: James E. Reilly
- Introduced by: Ken Corday and Tom Langan (1995, 1999); Ken Corday and Stephen Wyman (2003, 2007); Ken Corday, Albert Alarr and Greg Meng (2015, 2019); Ken Corday and Albert Alarr (2023); Ken Corday and Janet Spellman-Drucker (2024)
- Spin-off appearances: Last Blast Reunion (2019)
- Jay Kenneth Johnson as Philip Kiriakis
In-universe information
- Occupation: Businessman; ISA Agent; Marine
- Father: Victor Kiriakis
- Mother: Kate Roberts
- Stepparents: Maggie Horton
- Siblings: Isabella Toscano; Bo Brady; Xander Kiriakis; Austin Reed; Billie Reed; Lucas Horton; Cassie Brady; Rex Brady
- Spouse: Belle Black (2005–2007); Melanie Jonas (2010–2011)
- Children: Tyler Kiriakis
- Grandparents: Yurgos Kiriakis; Sophie Kiriakis
- Aunts and uncles: Alexander Kiriakis; Titus Kiriakis; Deimos Kiriakis
- Nieces and nephews: Brady Black; Shawn-Douglas Brady; Chelsea Brady; Zack Brady; Ciara Brady; Victoria Kiriakis; Will Horton; Allie Horton; Noah Reed; Emily Lockhart
- First cousins: Justin Kiriakis

Philip Kiriakis is a character from Days of Our Lives, an American soap opera. Child actors portrayed the character of Philip until he was rapidly aged and returned under the portrayal of Brandon Tyler in October 1999. Tyler was quickly replaced by Jay Kenneth Johnson, who was in the role until leaving the show in December 2002. The character returned in May 2003 played by Kyle Brandt. After Brandt left the show in October 2006, Johnson returned to the role in January 2007 then left on April 20, 2011. In 2015, actor John-Paul Lavoisier was cast in the role; he was let go the following year, last appearing in December 2016. In 2019, Johnson reprised the role on the digital-only Last Blast Reunion series and returned to Days of Our Lives in August 2020; he later departed in December 2021. In August 2023, Lavoisier returned to the role before departing two months later; he resumed the role when Philip returned to Salem in October 2024.

== Casting ==
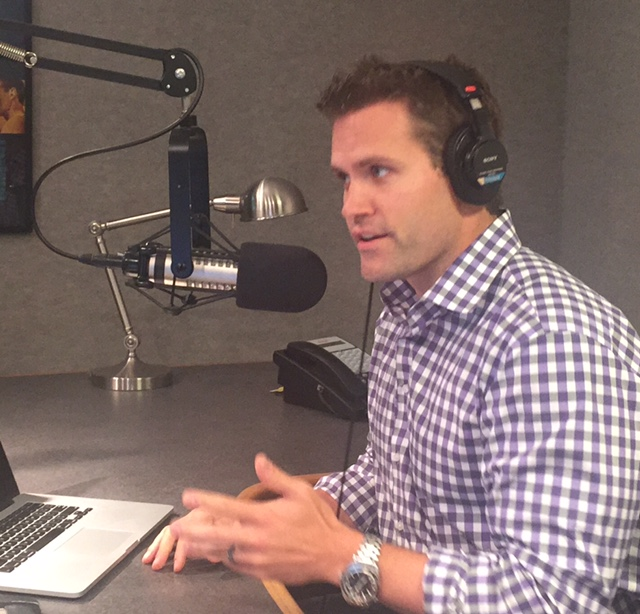
Kyle Brandt appeared in the role from 2003 to 2006

Child actors Jonathan and Thomas Selstad and Shane Nicholas played Philip from the character's birth until the rapidly aged character returned in the form of Brandon Tyler from October 21, 1999, to December 24, 1999. He was then portrayed by Jay Kenneth Johnson from December 27, 1999, to December 25, 2002 and Kyle Brandt from May 14, 2003, to October 12, 2006. Johnson again portrayed Philip having returned to the role from January 12, 2007, to April 20, 2011.

In July 2015, it was announced former One Life to Live actor John-Paul Lavoisier has been cast as Philip, first appearing on December 10 of the same year, as part of the soap's fiftieth anniversary. In July 2016, it was announced that Lavoisier would vacate the role of Philip and would film his final scenes within the month. The actor's final appearance was slated for December 19, 2016. However, the date was pushed back to December 20, 2016. In November 2019, People announced that Johnson would reprise the role in the digital "Last Blast Reunion" series. In May 2020, it was revealed that Johnson would again reprise the role on Days of Our Lives; he returned during the August 18, 2020, episode. Johnson vacated the role on December 22, 2021.

On July 14, 2023, Soap Opera Digest exclusively announced Lavoisier would reprise the role in August of the same year; he returned during the August 28 episode. Months later, on October 6, 2023, it was reported that Lavoisier will depart the show along with Nadia Bjorlin; he last appeared on October 12, 2023. Lavoisier reprised the role when Philip returned at the conclusion of the October 25, 2024, episode.

== Storylines ==
Philip is the biological son of Victor Kiriakis (John Aniston) and his fiancée Kate Roberts and the surrogate son of Vivian Alamain (Louise Sorel). He attends Salem High School before joining the military and marrying Belle Black. Later, he loses part of his left leg and has to wear a prosthetic. Philip and Belle separate when it is discovered that Claire Brady is not his biological daughter, but they eventually reunite and try to conceive their own child through in vitro fertilization. Philip's sperm is switched with Shawn-Douglas Brady's, resulting in Philip having a son Tyler with Mimi Lockhart. Belle leaves Philip for Shawn and Tyler is later placed for adoption. Phillip begins dating Stephanie Johnson and takes a more active role in running Titan Industries with his father. Phillip is seen as a disappointment by Victor and so he goes into business with Tony DiMera but, when they have an argument on the pier, Tony falls onto a sharp plank and dies at the hospital. Tony is not dead and reappears in 2020. Nicole Walker witnesses the scene and after being pressured by both Bo Brady and her father-in-law Stefano DiMera finally says it was an accident and Phillip is cleared of any wrongdoing. Victor becomes protective of Phillip once Stefano is consumed by grief and anger over Tony's death and threatens revenge against Phillip. While on a romantic trip with Stephanie, Phillip is shot and almost dies and everyone immediately suspects that Stefano ordered the hit as revenge for Tony's death.

Phillip has a one-night stand with Chloe Lane while he is married to Melanie Layton. Chloe gives birth to a boy Parker Jonas, whom she names after Daniel Jonas' mother's maiden name, since Daniel is assumed to be the father. Chloe and Phillip later believe (incorrectly) that Phillip is Parker's father, since Caroline switched the paternity test results. Melanie suffers a miscarriage caused by stress. Phillip leaves Salem for Chicago with Parker. Chloe later reveals that Daniel is actually Parker's biological father.
