= Peter Brash =

American television soap opera writer, screen writer and librettist

Peter Brash (born July 16, 1954) is an American television soap opera writer, screen writer, and musical theatre librettist. His career in soap opera spanned more than 25 years, and included many of the major network serials.

== Education and career ==
Peter Brash was born in Boston, MA, and graduated in 1976 from Boston College. He appeared in the 1983 film "Without a Trace" with Judd Hirsch. He began his soap opera writing career as a script writer on the NBC daytime drama "The Doctors" (1982) and then went on to write scripts for "Ryan's Hope" (1983–1985) and served as co-head writer on "Days of Our Lives" (2002–2003). His work has been recognized with an Emmy Award and two Writers Guild Awards.

He co-wrote the screenplay for "We Are the Hartmans" with director Laura Newman. The movie, starring Richard Chamberlain and Ben Curtis, had its world premiere at the 2011 Atlanta Film Festival.

In 2011, he co-created the musical comedy, "The Nutcracker and I", with music by Tchaikovsky, lyrics by Gerard Alessandrini, and book by Brash. The musical had its world premier performance on December 2, 2011 at the George Street Playhouse in New Brunswick, New Jersey, directed by the theatre's artistic director, David Saint.

== Positions held ==
Another World

- Script Writer: 1985, 1993–1995
- Associate Head Writer: 1985–1987, 1996–1998

As the World Turns

- Script Writer: August 9, 2007 – October 4, 2007; April 30, 2008 – July 21, 2009
- Associate Head Writer: September 24, 2007 – January 24, 2008; April 18, 2008 – June 27, 2008

Days of Our Lives

- Associate Head Writer: 1999 – March 28, 2002, March 7, 2003 – March 1, 2007
- Co-Head-Writer: March 29, 2002 – March 6, 2003

Guiding Light

- Associate Head Writer: 1989–1990

Ryan's Hope

- Associate Head Writer: 1984

== Awards and nominations ==
Daytime Emmy Awards

WINS

- (1990; Best Writing; Guiding Light)

NOMINATIONS

- (1994 & 1996; Best Writing; Another World)
- (1999; Best Writing; Days of Our Lives)

Writers Guild of America Award

WINS

- (2000 season; Days of Our Lives)
- (2009 season; As the World Turns)

NOMINATIONS

- (1994, 1995, 1996 & 1998 seasons; Another World)
- (2002 season; Days of Our Lives)
- (2010 season; As the World Turns)

| Preceded by Tom Langan | Head Writer of Days of Our Lives (with Paula Cwikly); March 29, 2002 – March 6, 2003 | Succeeded by Dena Higley |
