= Jason Cook (actor) =

American actor

- Born: September 13, 1980 (age 45); Camden, New Jersey, U.S.
- Occupations: Film director, writer, actor, film producer
- Years active: 1986–present
- Website: www.digitalcuvee.com

Jason John Cook (born September 13, 1980) is an American actor and filmmaker best known for the soap opera television roles of Shawn-Douglas Brady on Days of Our Lives (1999–2006, 2015), and Matt Hunter on General Hospital from 2008 to 2012. He is the writer, director, and producer of the feature film The Creatress, and most recently Four For Fun.

== Early life and education ==
Cook was born in Camden, New Jersey to Bill Cook (a licensed civil engineer in California) and JoAnn (a pre-school teacher). Growing up in Somerdale, he has two sisters, Michelle and Janean, and a brother, Michael. When he was very young, his family moved to California. At an early age, Jason began studying the piano. As his musical skills improved, he got occasional jobs performing at weddings. He did not consider acting until high school, when he served as an emergency replacement in Whodunnit. A friend of Jason's mother, whose husband was an agent and manager for child actors, helped Jason get his first auditions and roles. Jason attended Westlake High School in Westlake Village, California and graduated in 1998.

Jason attended Moorpark College, a two-year junior college, in Moorpark, California and completed his freshman year in the spring semester of 1999. While attending Moorpark College he was active on the speech and debate teams, competing nationally.

== Career ==
Cook portrayed Shawn-Douglas Brady on Days of Our Lives from October 1999 and was very popular with fans, especially in Shawn's relationship with Belle Black. Cook elected to leave the show when his contract with Days of Our Lives expired in September 2006. On May 28, 2015, it was announced that he would reprise the role for the show's 50th anniversary in the fall of 2015.

While on the show, Cook turned his attention to writing and directing films, making the indie film The Making of Triassic Park and later Social Security Guard, starring General Hospital co-star John Ingle. He left the show to pursue production full-time on Numb To Life, a documentary exploring pharmaceutical drug abuse, as his first feature documentary.

On April 23, 2008, it was announced that Cook would be returning to Daytime TV on General Hospital as new character Matt Hunter. His first appearance was on June 26, 2008.

Cook elected to leave General Hospital at the end of his contract to once again return to projects behind the camera. His first project was a philanthropic reality show co-produced with the Mandela family titled LifeCHANGE. This was followed up with the production of State of Bacon, a mockumentary surrounding the largest Bacon festival in the world, held yearly in Des Moines, Iowa.

In 2012, he participated in Fox's dating game show The Choice and portrayed 2014 James Thomas in Dean Jones' mystery thriller film Dark Awakening. opposite Lance Henriksen and Valerie Azlynn.

In 2018, he wrote, produced, and directed The Creatress, a film about a writer following up a bestselling debut novel starring Lindy Booth, Peter Bogdanovich, and Fran Drescher.

== Filmography ==
=== Writer/Director ===
Year	Title	Director	Writer	Producer
TBA	A.I. Heart U	Yes	Yes	Yes
2022	Four For Fun	Yes	Yes	Yes
2018	The Creatress	Yes	Yes	Yes
2013	State of Bacon	Yes	Yes	Executive
2012	LifeCHANGE	Yes	No	Yes
2012	Chop This	Yes	Creator	Yes
2008	The Vacation Epic	No	Yes	No
2008	Gregg's Story	No	Yes	No
2007–2009	Numb To Life	Yes	Yes	Yes
2007	I Arise	No	Yes	No
2007	Social Security Guard	Yes	Yes	Yes
2006	School Spirit	No	Yes	No
2004	The Making of Triassic Park	Yes	Yes	Yes

Author

- The Age of Airships (2013)
- The Boy and His Gryphon (2009)

Commercial

- East Meets South (2011)
- Two Buck Chuck (2010)

Music video

- High On the Hog (2011)

=== Actor ===
- Dark Awakening or Nevermore (2013) as James Thomas
- The Son of an Afghan Farmer (2011) as Ken
- General Hospital (2008–2012)(TV) as Matt Hunter
- Turbulent Skies (2010) (TV) as John Wilson
- Days of Our Lives (958 episodes, 1999–2006, 2015) (TV) as Shawn-Douglas Brady
- The Amanda Show (2 episodes, 1999) (TV)
- Project Time (15 episodes, 1998) (TV) as Jason

=== Host ===
- Miss World 2011 (London, 2011, TV)
- Miss World 2012 (Ordos, 2012, TV)
- Miss World 2016 (Washington DC, 2016, TV)

== Awards and nominations ==
Jason Cook has received recognition for his work on Days of Our Lives:

- 2001, Won Soap Opera Digest Award for 'Outstanding Younger Lead Actor'
- 2003, Won Boomerang Award for Outstanding Actor
- 2005, nominated for Soap Opera Digest Award for 'Favorite Triangle'
- 2005, nominated for Soap Opera Digest Award for 'Outstanding Younger Lead Actor'
- 2005, nominated for Daytime Emmy Awards Special Fan Award for 'Irresistible Combination'

== See also ==
- Days of Our Lives
- General Hospital
- Shawn-Douglas Brady
- Matt Hunter
- Shawn and Belle
- Supercouple
