= Shawn-Douglas Brady =

- Days of Our Lives character
- Brandon Beemer as Shawn-Douglas Brady
- Portrayed by: Noel Bennett Castle (1987); Paul Zachary (1990); Scott Groff (1990–1995); Collin O'Donnell (1995–1999); Jason Cook (1999–2006, 2015); Brandon Beemer (2006–2008, 2016–present)
- Duration: 1987; 1990–2008; 2015–present
- First appearance: April 6, 1987
- Created by: Leah Laiman
- Introduced by: Betty Corday, Ken Corday and Al Rabin (1987); Ken Corday, Albert Alarr and Greg Meng (2015); Ken Corday and Janet Spellman-Drucker (2024)
- Spin-off appearances: Last Blast Reunion (2019)
- Jason Cook as Shawn Brady
In-universe information
- Occupation: Police cadet; Courier; Mechanic; Legal assistant; Commissioner
- Father: Bo Brady
- Mother: Hope Williams
- Brothers: Zack Brady
- Sisters: Ciara Brady
- Half-sisters: Chelsea Brady
- Spouse: Mimi Lockhart (2006–2007); Belle Black (2007–2016, 2020–2024)
- Daughters: Claire Brady
- Grandfathers: Victor Kiriakis; Doug Williams; Shawn Brady (legal)
- Grandmothers: Caroline Brady; Addie Horton
- Uncles: Steven Olson; Roman Brady; Douglas LeClaire; Xander Kiriakis; Philip Kiriakis; Frankie Brady; Max Brady (adoptive)
- Aunts: Julie Olson; Kimberly Brady; Kayla Brady; Isabella Toscano
- Nephews: Bo Weston; Isaac Brady
- Nieces: Addie Weston
- First cousins: David Banning; Robert Anderson Jr. Spencer Olson; Brady Black; Victoria Kiriakis; Tyler Kiriakis; Carrie Brady; Eric Brady; Sami Brady; Rex Brady; Cassie Brady; Andrew Donovan IV; Theresa Donovan; Stephanie Johnson; Joey Johnson

Shawn-Douglas Brady is a fictional character from Days of Our Lives, an American soap opera on the NBC network. He is the son of supercouple Bo Brady and Hope Williams, and one half of the supercouple Shawn Brady and Belle Black. Jason Cook portrayed the character from October 15, 1999, to September 22, 2006. Brandon Beemer played in the role from September 28, 2006, to March 21, 2008. In May 2015, Soap Opera Digest reported the character would be returning for the show's 50th anniversary, once again portrayed by Cook. On November 10, 2015, it was confirmed that Beemer would return to the role in 2016, replacing Cook again. In March 2016, it was revealed that Beemer along with three other actors were let go from the show. However, in May 2016, Daytime Confidential revealed that Beemer would again be returning to the show. Shawn then appeared for various stints of different lengths before rejoining the regular cast again in 2020. In October 2023, Beemer made an unannounced departure from the show; last airing on October 12, 2023. Beemer resumed the role when Shawn-Douglas returned in November 2024.

== Storylines ==
Born in 1987, Shawn is the son of supercouple, Bo and Hope Brady. Shortly after his birth, he leaves Salem with them; they return in 1990. However, tragedy strikes when his mother is presumed dead a few months later. That same year, Shawn falls into a pipe and loses his hearing. With his mother gone, Shawn and his father become close with Shawn's doctor and eventually Bo's fiancée, Carly Manning. When Bo and Carly's engagement ends, Shawn bonds with Bo's new girlfriend, Billie Reed, who later becomes Bo's wife. Then, Shawn's mother, Hope, returns to Salem. Although Hope does not know who she is at first, her memory returns and Bo and Hope reunite. Shawn eventually regains his hearing. At an early age, Shawn is kidnapped by Stefano DiMera, but escapes. In high school, Shawn competes with Philip Kiriakis for the romantic affections of both Belle Black and Chloe Lane. Shawn and Belle become a couple, while Philip and Chloe enjoy a brief romance. The following summer, Shawn and Belle join other teens from Salem High on an ill-fated trip to Puerto Rico. While hunting for Alice Horton's missing ruby, Shawn is caught up in Jan Spears's personal tragedy. She becomes pregnant after being raped while on the island, and Shawn offers to say he is the father to spare her any additional humiliation, tearing his relationship with Belle apart.

By the end of her senior year, Belle learns the truth, and the two are on the brink of reconciliation. However, impending college careers, the arrival of Rex and Cassie Brady, and old trust issues keep them apart. When Hope and Shawn's baby brother are kidnapped, it brings Belle and Shawn together on a mission to find them. However, Philip Kiriakis returns to Salem, and he and Belle are matched up on the dating show Love is Blind.

More trouble ensues when Jan Spears rears her devious head in Salem. Shawn leaves Salem distraught and confused by the revelation that Belle's mother, Marlena Evans, is the Salem Stalker and responsible for the death of Shawn's family members. This is just the opportunity Jan needs. She casts her net and holds Shawn captive in a giant cage. This allows Belle to grow closer to Philip.

Once Shawn finally escapes, he crashes his motorcycle, leaving him with amnesia. Jan furthers her evil plans by not only convincing Shawn they were in love, but that they were engaged. Fate intervenes - Shawn realizes his love for Belle, and he crashes his motorcycle through the window of St. Luke's, but can not stop her marriage to Philip. Later, Shawn even helps in a rescue mission when Philip's troop is taken hostage overseas. He finally moves on after Belle gives birth to Philip's daughter, Claire, although unknown to all, Claire is in fact Shawn's daughter.

Following Belle and Philip's wedding, Shawn and Mimi explore their feelings for each other. On New Year's Eve they get engaged and later marry.

A DNA test proves that Shawn is Claire's biological father. This creates a complex predicament for Shawn and Belle, since an in vitro mix-up meant that Belle is carrying a second baby fathered by Shawn.

When Shawn learns that Mimi knows he is Claire's father and never told him, he declares their marriage is over and leaves. Upon hearing that Victor also knows the truth about Claire's paternity, he runs a race car through a wall at the Kiriakis mansion and declares that he is done with Victor as well.

Belle loses the baby she is carrying. Shortly afterwards, Shawn misunderstands a conversation Belle is having with Carrie, leading him to believe she wants nothing to do with him. He finds solace with Willow, a former hooker, and the two eventually move in together. Shawn insists Willow hide from Belle, which creates much tension in their relationship. He still wants to have a relationship with Claire, and Belle tells him the only way is to clear up his life. Staying with Willow out of sympathy, which seems to be a habit with Shawn, he drives Belle further and further away. After yet another bad decision to work for E.J. Wells as a courier, Bo decides it is time to step in and warn his son.

After several run-ins with Willow and Belle, Shawn finally decides to be a good father to Claire and that he needs to quit working for EJ Wells as well as break it off with Willow. Shortly after Shawn asks Willow to move out, she sets fire to the apartment and Shawn is kicked out. Shawn is forced to move in with his parents.

Just as Belle and Shawn are getting closer, they are issued court papers that Philip is fighting them for custody. Philip is awarded temporary custody of Claire and the devastated Shawn and Belle are ordered to take parenting classes. As Victor and Philip leave the court room, Shawn overhears Victor saying they will never give up Claire now they have her. Everyone knows Victor paid off the judge just as he has the Child Protective Service worker, and even Willow to testify in court against Shawn.

Mimi tells Shawn, just a day later while at the Kiriakis mansion to confront Philip, she saw a passport for Claire. Shawn makes the decision that he and Belle have to beat Philip and Victor at their own game by kidnapping Claire and going on the run. In the course of a few months they went to Canada and then got on a boat to Australia. They are pursued by Philip at every corner. They end up on a small island called Tinda Lau where they ultimately have to flee from Philip again. It is in this final pursuit that Philip ruins the engine of their boat and nearly kills everyone including himself. As they realize that death is a possibility they promise that if they get out of this to return to Salem as friends and that they will work out an agreeable custody arrangement. During the time of their fleeing Philip, Shawn and Belle grew closer and got back together.

Belle asks Philip to help Shawn find a job. Philip arranges for Shawn to get a job with a company that Titan owned, in Ohio—one that requires extensive travel. It is not long before Shawn finds out how he landed the interview and by coincidence, he gets a call from Mimi about the baby that Philip is supposed to have with the surrogate mother. On July 4, 2007, Shawn is supposed to go to the interview but instead flies out to Indianapolis to meet Lauren, the surrogate mother. Instead of ending the pregnancy as she said she would, she keeps the baby and extorts money from Bonnie Lockhart until she can not do so any longer. This leads to Philip receiving harassing phone calls until he confronts Lauren.

On July 25, 2007, Shawn asks Belle Black to marry him. Temptation and grief over losing her father lead Belle to sleep with Philip. On November 23, 2007, Belle and Shawn are married in a ceremony at his parents' house. His father does not attend. On December 31, 2007, Belle admits to Shawn that she slept with Philip. In March 2008, Shawn and Belle reconcile and decide to do as Shawn's parents did and sail the world to strengthen their marriage and find peace. In October 2011, Hope mentions she received an email from Shawn, saying that he is glad that everything has worked out with his parents and that their granddaughter, Claire, misses them.

Shawn briefly returns to Salem in late 2015, much to his mother's surprise, at the Brady Pub before leaving again. In January 2016, he returns again to Salem intending to being there for his daughter and work things out with Belle. When Belle turns him down, telling him that their marriage is over and moves on with her ex-husband Philip, Shawn gets himself a job at Salem PD, where he meets Lani Price (Sal Stowers). Shawn and Lani date for a little while, but Shawn and Belle finally decide to give their marriage a second chance. Shawn breaks up with Lani. Belle gets a job offer in Hong Kong. Shawn and Belle move there. In late 2016, Shawn returns to Salem as his mother Hope Brady is on trial for the murder of Stefano Dimera. Shawn sticks around for a while to support his mother, sister Ciara and daughter Claire during this difficult time. Hope is released from prison and Shawn returns to Belle in Hong Kong. Shawn and Belle return to Salem in December 2017 to support their daughter after the shooting of her boyfriend Theo Carver.

Claire and Theo break up and she starts dating Tripp Dalton, whom she comes to be obsessed with. This gets Claire into some trouble which fortunately requires visits from her parents. After almost burning Shawn's little sister Ciara to death, Shawn and Belle show up at the university hospital and vow to stay by their daughter's side to help her get better.

In November 2019, Shawn and Belle go to the last blast reunion in New York where they meet their old high school friends Philip Kiriakis, Mimi Lockhart, Chloe Lane, Susan, Kevin and Jason. Unfortunately the fun is interrupted when Shawn's old nemesis Jan Spears surprisingly shows up to kidnap Shawn. She also tries to blow up Belle and the others with a bomb. Jan is sent to Shady Pines for that crime.

During the summer of 2020, Claire seems fit to return to society so she is released from Bayview. Shawn and Belle stay in Salem to make sure Claire is better. Shawn also attends his little sister Ciara's wedding to Ben Weston. The wedding ends with a bomb caused by Eve Donovan and Vincent Bellman which eventually leads to the disappearance of Ben and the presumed death of Ciara Brady Weston. Shawn helps his mother with the police investigation.

To Shawn's dissatisfaction, Philip returns to Salem that summer. Moreover, Jan Spears shows up in Salem and befriends Claire. This makes Shawn furious and he sternly warns his daughter to stay away from Jan Spears.

== See also ==
- Supercouple
- Shawn Brady and Belle Black
