= Tom Langan =

American producer and writer

Tom Langan is an American producer and writer. He additionally has performed in acting roles.

During the 1990s, he served as Co-Executive Producer for the show Days of Our Lives.

== Contributions ==
=== Positions held ===
Days of Our Lives

- Co-Executive Producer: April 21, 1992 – March 28, 2002
- Producer: 1991 - 1992
- Head Writer: November 11, 1999 - March 28, 2002

Days of our Lives: Primetime Specials

- Winter Heat: February 4, 1994
- Night Sins: February 26, 1993
- One Stormy Night: January 10, 1992

The Young and the Restless

- Producer: 1986 - 1991
- Associate Producer: 1980 - 1986

Intimate Portrait: Lisa Rinna: 2001

- As himself

== Head writing tenure ==
Preceded by Lorraine Broderick	Head Writer of Days of Our Lives; November 11, 1999 – March 28, 2002	Succeeded by Peter Brash; Paula Cwikly

== Executive Producing Tenure ==
Preceded by Ken Corday; Al Rabin	Executive Producer of Days of Our Lives (with Ken Corday); June 18, 1992 – March 28, 2002	Succeeded by Ken Corday; Stephen Wyman
