= Lauren Koslow =

American actress

- Born: Lauren Alice Koslow; Boston, Massachusetts, United States
- Occupation: Actress
- Years active: 1984–present
- Spouse: Nick Schillace (1987–present)
- Children: 4

Lauren Alice Koslow is an American actress, best known for her long-running portrayal of Kate Roberts on the soap opera Days of Our Lives, which she has played continuously since 1996. She has also appeared in the soaps The Bold and the Beautiful and The Young and the Restless.

== Early life and education ==
Koslow was born in Boston, where she spent the early years of her childhood.

== Career ==
She began her acting career with touring theatre work in such productions as Cat on a Hot Tin Roof and Dial M for Murder.

Turning to television in the mid-1980s, Koslow was cast in the role of Lindsay Wells on the CBS soap opera The Young and the Restless, which she played from 1984 to 1986. She was then asked by the serial's creators William J. Bell and wife Lee Phillip Bell to become an original cast member on the duo's new sister soap The Bold and the Beautiful which debuted in the spring of 1987. She portrayed fashion designer Margo Lynley from the serial's inception until 1992, and later filmed a cameo flashback sequence as the character in 2002.

Through the early 1990s, Koslow had guest-starring roles in several prime time series, including Silk Stalkings and The Nanny. She returned to daytime television in 1996, replacing actress Deborah Adair on NBC soap Days of Our Lives, after Adair's departure from the series in February 1995.

Koslow assumed Adair's role of vindictive call girl turned corporate executive Kate Roberts on Days of Our Lives. The character is known for her wickedness and deception, specifically her ongoing war with fellow Salem resident Sami Brady (Alison Sweeney), the former ex-fiancé of Kate's son Austin (Austin Peck) and ex-fiancé/current ex-wife of her son Lucas (Bryan Dattilo), and numerous affairs and romantic entanglements. Other notable character conflicts include Kate's mysterious past with series villain Stefano DiMera (Joseph Mascolo), her rocky marriage with mogul Victor Kiriakis (John Aniston), and her rivalries with crazed socialite Vivian Alamain (Louise Sorel) and Nicole Walker DiMera. Kate is the mother of Lucas Horton, Rex Brady, Cassie Brady, Philip Kiriakis, Billie Reed, and Austin Reed.

In May 2026, it was announced Koslow would pinch-hit in the role of Jill Abbott on The Young and the Restless, due to Jess Walton being unavailable. Scenes in her five-episode portrayal began airing in June of the same year.

== Personal life ==
Koslow married makeup artist Nicky Schillace in 1987. They have three children.

In October 2021, Koslow announced she was reunited with her firstborn son Josh, from whom she was separated (through unknown circumstances) three days after his birth.

== Filmography ==
Year	Title	Role	Notes
1984–1986	The Young and the Restless	Lindsey Wells	
1984	Hard to Hold	Band Friend #1	
1986	Mickey Spillane's Mike Hammer	Val Kearney	Episode: Mistress for the Prosecution
1987–1992, 2002	The Bold and the Beautiful	Margo MacClaine Lynley	
1987	Spies	Karen	Episode: Radar Love
1993	Silk Stalkings	Alexandra Dale	Episode: Sex, Lies and Yellow Tape
1994	The Nanny	C.C.'s Friend #2	Episode: Deep Throat
1994	Valley of the Dolls	Cynthia Redicker	Episode: #1.10
1996–present	Days of Our Lives	Kate Roberts	Regular role
1996	Zork: Nemesis	Madame Sophia Hamilton	Video game
2011	Criminal Minds: Suspect Behavior	Allison Gilroy	Episode: See No Evil
2017	Great News	Kate Roberts	Episode: War Is Hell
2018	Lethal Beauty	Liz	TV film
2026	The Young and the Restless	Jill Abbott	Guest role

== Herself ==
Year	Title	Notes
1989	Family Feud	Episode: The Young & the Restless vs. The Bold & the Beautiful
unknown	Woof! It's a Dog's Life with Matthew Margolis	Episode Dated: Unknown
1998	The Tim Pipher Show	Guest
2003–2004	SoapTalk	Episodes Dated: July 22, 2003 and April 1, 2004
2005	Family Feud	Episode: Naughty vs. Nice
2009	American Idol: The Search for a Superstar	Herself/Audience Member; Episode: The Top Seven Finalists Perform
2015	Today (American TV program)	Guest

== Awards ==
- In 2000 Koslow was nominated for a Soap Opera Digest Award as Outstanding Supporting Actress for her work on Days of Our Lives.
