= Jordan Ridgeway =

Days of Our Lives character

- Days of Our Lives character
- Portrayed by: Chrishell Stause
- Duration: 2013–2015; 2019–2021
- First appearance: August 15, 2013
- Last appearance: May 25, 2021
- Created by: Gary Tomlin and Christopher Whitesell
- Introduced by: Ken Corday, Lisa de Cazotte and Greg Meng; Ken Corday, Albert Alarr and Greg Meng (2019)
In-universe information
- Other names: Tammy Sue (birth name); Lynda Cechert; Joan Cooper; Ellen Rogers
- Occupation: Physical therapist
- Stepfather: Clyde Weston
- Half-brothers: Ben Weston
- Sons: David Ridgeway

Jordan Ridgeway is a fictional character on Days of Our Lives, an American soap opera on the NBC network. Introduced by Ken Corday, Lisa de Cazotte and Greg Meng, and created by Gary Tomlin and Christopher Whitesell, the character is portrayed by former All My Children actress Chrishell Stause. Debuting on August 15, 2013, she departed the role on March 9, 2015. She returned on February 4, 2019, on a recurring basis. The character exited on November 11, 2019, and Stause briefly reprised the role during guest appearances on March 4 and July 20, 2020, and also on May 24–25, 2021.

The character was introduced as a physical therapist brought to Salem by Kate Roberts (Lauren Koslow) to help an ailing Rafe Hernandez (Galen Gering) during his rehabilitation; she soon begins to develop a relationship with Rafe, much to the displeasure of Kate, who immediately sets out to discover the secrets that Jordan has been harboring.

Stause received a Daytime Emmy Award nomination for Outstanding Guest Performer in a Drama Series in 2020.

== Creation ==
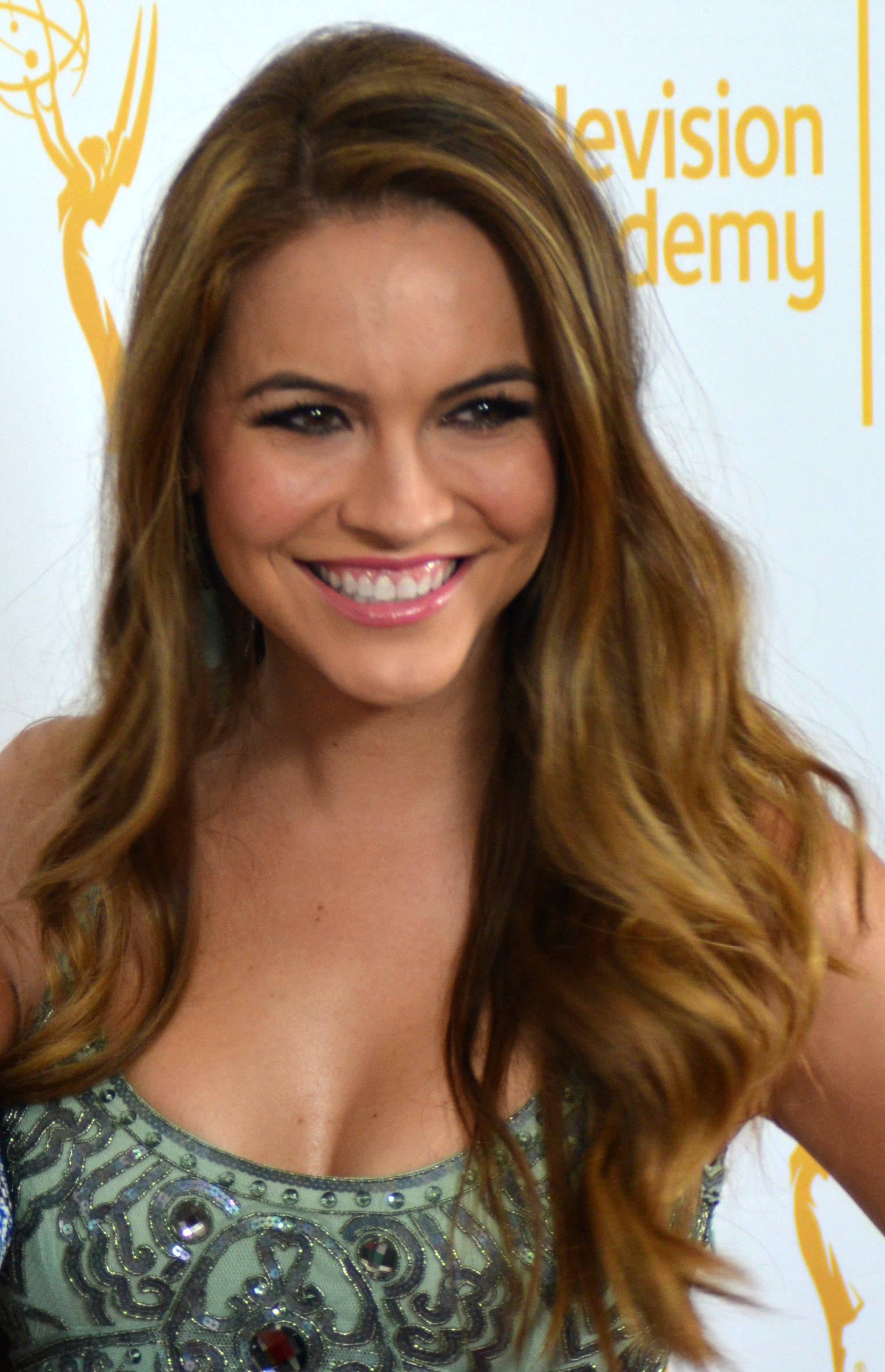
Stause joined Days of Our Lives in early 2013, following a six-year run as Amanda Dillon on All My Children.

=== Casting ===
On March 22, 2013, Stause was elated that the once cancelled All My Children, where she played Amanda Dillon from 2005 to 2011, had been revived, but revealed that she could not participate in the reboot because she was already under contract with another daytime soap. However the actress could not speak on the casting at the time. On April 18, 2013, TVLine officially announced that Stause had joined the cast of Days of our Lives in a contract role, with August as a potential air date. However, information about the character was not made available. Stause filmed her first scenes during the week of April 7, 2013. Many suspected that Stause would be a recast of Cassie Brady (Alexis Thorpe). She said she enjoyed playing such a different role and appreciated that it allowed her to branch out, and that she was offered another "more glamorous" role, but she chose to take the role of Jordan because it was so different from her previous roles. Stause learned about the role from her manager and when she went in to audition, she found out that they were casting for two separate roles. Actress Jen Lilley revealed that she had also auditioned for the role of Jordan, before she was cast in the role of Theresa Donovan. On October 24, 2014, Stause announced her exit from the series, and last appeared during the March 9, 2015, episode.

In August 2018, it was announced that Stause would be returning for as Jordan. She returned on February 4, 2019, and appeared in various stints until November 11 of the same year. She also appeared briefly on March 4 and July 20, 2020, as well as May 24 and May 25, 2021.

=== Characterization ===
Stause told Soapdom.com, that she enjoyed the "layers to the character." In an interview with TVLine, she revealed that her character did not wear any makeup. However, Jordan is very serious about her career, and "she’s very no-nonsense. She’s not there to humor anyone. In fact, she comes across robotic at first." Of her character's introduction, Stause said Jordan is "strong, very smart, very take-charge, all business." She does not care about her physical appearance. Of her character's "impersonal" demeanor, Stause said, "She's not bitchy, she's just very businesslike." Jordan is not "meek" or "sheepish," but instead, "She will literally bark you out of the room," she said. Despite the character's onscreen appearance, the series released several publicity photos with Stause looking completely different from her character. The character is "definitely working with a good moral compass," Stause said in an interview with Soaps She Knows. Stause said Jordan is a "good person, because it takes a certain type of person who wants to be a physical therapist and really heal people." Jordan gives "tough love, but she gets results." She told About.com that she took the "tough love" approach from her own sister's physical therapist.

== Development ==
=== Introduction ===
In June 2013, Stause revealed that her character is "very opposite," of her All My Children character, Amanda. She said that the character harbors secrets, and also revealed that she shared her first scenes with Galen Gering and Lauren Koslow, who portray Rafe Hernandez and Kate Roberts, respectively. she told On-Air On-Soaps that the secret was a significant one. Of the character's introduction, executive producer Ken Corday said it would be a "very slow build." Stause said the character's slow introduction allowed for viewers to "warm up" to the character. The character is introduced as a "plain Jane" physical therapist who joins the staff at Salem University Hospital. Jordan's arrival strikes a nerve with Kate, who thinks she is a man, because of her name. Kate feels threatened because of her "friends with benefits" relationship with Rafe. She said the character would eventually make a "transition," similar to Rachael Leigh Cook's character in She's All That.

=== Rafe, Kate and Jordan's past ===
According to Stause, Rafe is taken aback by Jordan's "impersonal" demeanor. However, Rafe treats it as a game, doing everything he can to break down the "closed-off wall." Though Jordan initially rejects him, Rafe eventually gets her to open up. The turning point for the duo is when Rafe reacts badly to the lack of feedback from Jordan during a physical therapy session. Jordan finally understands that her encouragement could help his recovery, she lets her guard down. Jordan's professionalism becomes a problem when she starts to fall for Rafe. It is kind of a "push-pull for Jordan," she said. She said Jordan is "definitely scared of her feelings for Rafe," because it is unprofessional to fall for a patient. Rafe jokes about firing Jordan once he is recovered so they can date, and that is when she starts to let her guard down viewers would see the "chemistry" between the characters.

Stause said that Jordan's dynamic with Kate becomes very "antagonistic." According to the actress, Jordan finds Kate "overbearing" and initially doesn't "give her a second thought." However, Jordan gets nervous when Kate starts digging into her past. Of the character's past, she said fans would need to be patient because the story about Jordan's past would take some time to come out. "Obviously some things have happened that she needs to run from or that she is afraid of." When Jordan's feelings for Rafe evolve, Jordan becomes much more vulnerable. She revealed to Soaps She Knows that "We will see that dynamic come into play where even though she acts like she is not afraid of Kate, we will see that she is slightly afraid of the fact that Kate was able to pull up some stuff from the past and how it could affect her life."

With the casting of Jade Harlow in the recurring role of Sheryl, the show began developing and exploring the character's background. In February 2014, it was announced that country singer Justin Gaston had been cast as Jordan's brother, Ben Rogers, with whom she shares a secret past.

== Storylines ==
Jordan arrived in Salem in mid-August 2013, per the request of Kate Roberts (Koslow) to help rehabilitate Rafe Hernandez (Gering), following his being attacked. Originally very guarded and off-putting, Jordan begins to let down her walls around Rafe, much to the chagrin of Kate. As a result, Kate begins to investigate Jordan's past, which does not settle well with her. After sharing her first kiss with Rafe, Jordan begins to pull herself from Rafe once more. At her apartment, she opens a lockbox only to reveal several I.D.'s with different names, all featuring various looks. As Jordan begins to develop a relationship with Rafe, Jordan's old friend Sheryl (Jade Harlow) from Birmingham arrives in town in early 2014, and immediately begins to stir up Jordan's past by connecting with Kate, Rafe, Sami Brady (Alison Sweeney) and Lucas Horton (Bryan Dattilo). Jordan and Sheryl then enter into a conflict, over Sheryl's arrival into town; however both ladies agree to make the best of their rekindled friendship. Kate then involves Lucas in her scheme against Jordan, and during a night out, Kate breaks into Jordan's apartment and discovers her box of hidden I.D.'s; Kate is then caught when Jordan arrives back early. Following her step-father's arrival into town, Rafe and Jordan soon separate and she eventually falls for town bad boy, Chad DiMera (Billy Flynn). They soon breakup following the belief that Chad pursued legal action against her brother and in March 2015, she eventually leaves town following a job offer in New York City. She returned in early 2019 briefly, keeping Ciara Brady and Charlotte DiMera hostage to protect them from changed Ben and pointing all the evidences to him. She is then admitted to the mental asylum, Bayview. During her treatment in Bayview, she reveals a secret to Rafe about giving birth to a child who she named David Ridgeway, giving him the responsibly of looking after her son in her absence.

== Reception ==
Stause's teasing led to much fan speculation on Twitter about what soap she would join. "Things will undoubtedly heat up in Salem this summer," Matt Webb Mitovitch said of the casting announcement. Kambra Clifford of Soap Opera Network was very happy about the casting, and announced the news with headline, "Chrishell Stause Is Baaaaack!" Michael Fairman said Stause's debut was greatly anticipated by viewers and critics. Matt Webb Mitovitch compared the character to the General Hospital characters of Lucy Coe (Lynn Herring) and Sabrina Santiago (Teresa Castillo) and Days's own, Chloe Lane (Nadia Bjorlin) due to her introduction as the "ugly duckling." Webb Mitovitch described Jordan as having an "icy demeanor." "Now the kicker is, Stause is going to be dressed down for the role, no bombshell gowns, or glamor for now! She is an all business therapist," Michael Fairman said of the character's initial introduction. Omar Nobles of TV Source Magazine said of the character, "Jordan's strong, assertive and focused on her career. She also doesn't particularly care about her outward appearance. She may be a 'Plain Jane' but you'll think the opposite when you see Chrishell Stause's new publicity photos!" Janet Di Lauro said, "Bye-bye lashes and lip gloss. Farewell tight skirts and high heels. From the minute Chrishell Stause stepped foot on the Days of our Lives sound stage as a physical therapist Jordan Ridgeway, she's been the Plane Jane poster child. For the beautiful actress, who turned heads in her previous soap role as Amanda Dillon on All My Children, it's been an adjustment. But she's taking it one dowdy day at a time." Mark Edward Willows said "her storyline is so intriguing that you can call her the 'mystery lady." Jamey Giddens said, "surprised to see how the soap frumped the gorgeous Stause up for her new gig." TV Buzz's Deanna Barnert described Jordan as a "hard-working duckling just begging for a makeover."
