= Kate Roberts (Days of Our Lives) =

Fictional character from Days of Our Lives

- Days of Our Lives character
- Lauren Koslow as Kate Roberts
- Portrayed by: Deborah Adair (1993–1995); Lauren Koslow (1996–present)
- Duration: 1993–present
- First appearance: February 24, 1993
- Created by: Sheri Anderson
- Introduced by: Ken Corday and Tom Langan
In-universe information
- Other names: Katherine Elizabeth Roberts; Kate Brown; Kate Kiriakis; Kate Brady; Kate DiMera
- Occupation: Businesswoman; CEO of various companies; B&B landlady; Waitress; Sex worker
- Spouse: Curtis Reed (1969–1993); Victor Kiriakis (1993–1995) (Note: Victor and Kate were originally married on September 8, 1993. The marriage was proven to be invalid in March 1994 when it was revealed that Kate was still married to Curtis Reed when they married. They married in 1995 again but because on January 19, 1995, Vivian Alamain tricked Victor into marriage during the rehearsal dinner, this marriage was also invalid); Roman Brady (2003–2005, 2022–present); Stefano DiMera (2009–2012); André DiMera (2017–2018)
- Sons: Austin Reed; Lucas Horton; Rex Brady; Philip Kiriakis
- Daughters: Billie Reed; Cassie Brady
- Grandsons: Will Horton; Tyler Kiriakis; Noah Reed
- Granddaughters: Chelsea Brady; Allie Horton; Emily Lockhart
- Other relatives: Arianna Horton; Henry Horton; Issac Brady

Kate Roberts is a fictional character from Days of Our Lives, an American soap opera on the NBC network. The matriarch of the series' Roberts family, the role was originated by Deborah Adair in 1993, and is currently played by (and most associated with) Lauren Koslow, who has held the role since 1996. Kate is the mother of Austin Reed, Billie Reed, Lucas Horton, Philip Kiriakis, and the twins Cassie and Rex Brady. Kate is the wife of Roman Brady, the ex-wife of Curtis Reed, Victor Kiriakis and Stefano DiMera, and is the widow of André DiMera. She is known for getting what she wants via scheming.

== Character conception ==
=== Casting ===
The character was created by Days of Our Lives head writer Sheri Anderson, and first portrayed by actress Deborah Adair in 1993. Adair's exit was announced in December 1994 when she opted to leave the role at the end of her contract with the serial. She last filmed in February 1995 and exited the role on April 20. Following her exit, Adair retired from acting. The character was reintroduced on January 25, 1996, under the pen of head writer James E. Reilly, and played by Lauren Koslow, who had previously starred on The Bold and the Beautiful. Other to audition for the role included Lois Chiles and Janice Lynde, both of whom Koslow auditioned with. In November 2023, it was revealed Koslow had dropped to recurring status.

Anderson, who wrote for Adair, said in an interview in 2011 that Reilly put a bit of a different spin on the character of Kate to Anderson's initial conception.

=== Characterization ===
Kate's primary role within the narrative is that of a femme-fatale and villainess. She is portrayed as a stoic, aggressive and family-oriented woman who is generally loving and supportive, but often interferes in her friends and relatives lives through any means she thinks necessary. When Kate arrives in Salem (the town where the soap opera is set) in 1993 she is single, with one adult son, Lucas Roberts. As the story develops it is revealed that Kate has lived in Salem before, where she was married with two children; but when Kate got pregnant with Lucas by another man (Dr Bill Horton), her husband kicked her out, and vanished with their two children, faking their deaths. In the storyline, Kate discovers her elder children (Austin Reed and Billie Reed) are alive and living in Salem and she is reunited with them.

Some sources confuse Kate Roberts with 1970s Days of Our Lives character Dr Kate Winograd (played by Elaine Princi), who was Head of Anesthesiology at Salem University Hospital, and who had a friendship and attraction with her colleague Bill Horton in Days of Our Lives episodes broadcast from 1977 to 1979. However, the broadcast story of Dr Kate Winograd and the backstory of Kate Roberts are incompatibly different, and other sources, including Sony Pictures Television's official website, keep the two Kates as separate characters. Moreover, Days headwriter Sheri Anderson stated in 2011 that she "actually originally created the character of Kate" with her friend Deborah Adair initially playing her (in 1993); and actress Lauren Koslow showed no knowledge of Dr Kate Winograd in a 2015 interview with AfterBuzz TV.

== Storylines ==
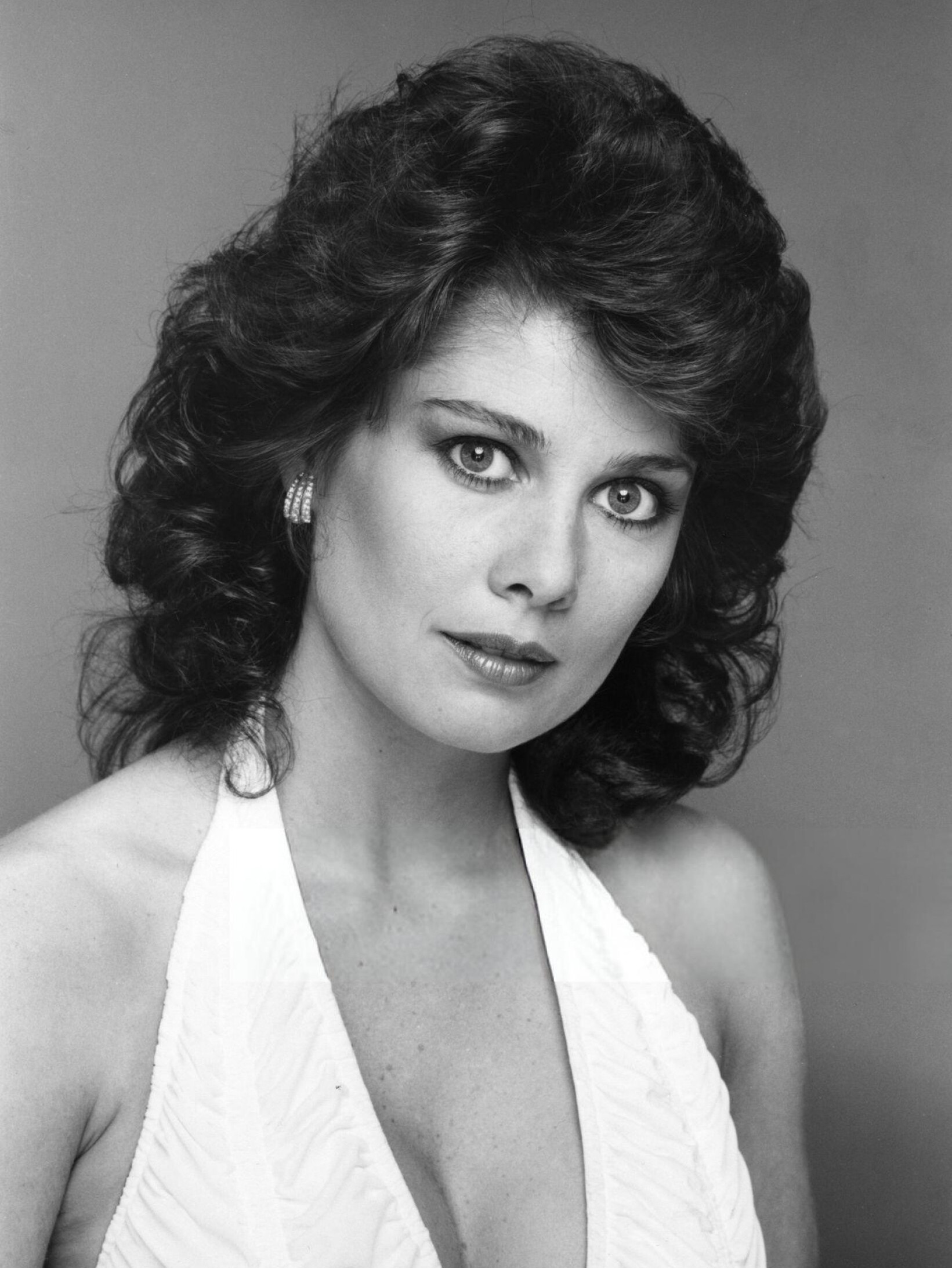
Deborah Adair originated the role of Kate

In February 1993, businesswoman Kate (Deborah Adair) arrives in Salem to work at Titan Publishing Company for Victor Kiriakis (John Aniston). It is revealed that Kate has lived in Salem before. She is friends with psychiatrist Marlena Evans (Deidre Hall) and is a former patient of hers. Kate kept a journal back when she was Marlena's patient and Kate breaks in to the house she used to live in Salem trying to find it. At Titan, Kate is given a manuscript of a novel to consider for publication. When she reads it, she realizes it is her life story, plagiarized from her journal and blocks its publication.

Kate's son, Lucas Roberts (Bryan Dattilo) joins her in Salem, on a spring break from West Point Military Academy. When Kate meets Tom Horton and Alice Horton (Macdonald Carey and Frances Reid) Alice realizes Kate used to be a tenant in a house owned by her son, Bill Horton (now occupied by his daughter, Jennifer and her husband, Jack Deveraux, who found her journal and wrote the novel); Tom recognizes her as a former patient and an abused woman. Tom also remembers that he delivered her baby (Lucas). Kate wants the secrets about her past to remain hidden, but Lucas wants to know the identity of his father. Kate tells him that his father was "Alan Roberts" and given him a photo, but Lucas discovers that the photo is of a random stranger and that "Alan Roberts" does not exist. In response to Lucas's anger, Kate tells him she does not know his father's name. Kate informs a stunned Lucas that before he was born, she was married to an abusive man, with whom she had two children and she turned to Lucas's father for comfort. She cries when she tells him the children, his half-brother and half-sister, later died in a motor accident.

Meanwhile, Kate and Victor become close, and she and Vivian Alamain (Louise Sorel) who loves Victor, become rivals in their pursuit of his love. Kate and Victor later marry after he proposes to her, and reveals that he wants to have children with her.

A man named Curtis Reed (Nick Benedict) arrives in Salem and starts blackmailing Kate about her past. Lucas learns that this is Kate's former husband, who was violent to her. Curtis is later murdered, with his body next to his drugged daughter Billie Reed (Lisa Rinna), whom Curtis drugged and abused before his death. Kate, Lucas, Billie and her brother, Austin Reed (Patrick Muldoon) all come under suspicion for Curtis's murder, but Billie becomes the prime suspect. There is a trial where they all have to testify.

Meanwhile, Vivian has rescued Bill Horton's wife, Laura Horton (Jaime Lyn Bauer) from the sanitarium where she was being kept comatose by corrupt staff (to extort money for her care from the Horton family) Vivian and Laura crash the trial, and Laura tells the whole court that Kate was married to Curtis (a fact she knows from them both being former tenants of Bill and hers) then Billie admits on the stand that she is Curtis's daughter and was sexually abused by Curtis during her childhood. Billie and Austin realize that Kate is their mother and vice versa. Initially Billie blames Kate for the abuse she suffered; but when Curtis had found out Kate was pregnant with another man's child, he beat her and left her abandoned by the side of a road, and vanished with Austin and Billie. Billie is found to be innocent when it is discovered that Curtis was accidentally shot during a scuffle with Stefano DiMera (Joseph Mascolo).

Vivian, who wants to break up Kate and Victor, urges Laura to go public with the fact that Kate had a sexual affair with Laura's husband Bill Horton – the father of Lucas. Laura crashes a party Victor is holding for Kate and reveals this. Lucas is outraged that Kate has kept his father from him. Victor also learns from a tabloid reporter that his marriage to Kate is invalid, as Curtis was still alive when they married. Kate wants to marry Victor legally, and Victor promises to marry her, but only if she gives him an heir. When Kate learns she will have difficulty in conceiving another child, they decide to use in vitro fertilization. Some embryos begin to form, but Vivian swaps the embryos and has Victor and Kate's embryos implanted in her. Vivian gives birth to a healthy baby boy, Philip Kiriakis in February 1995. While pregnant with Philip, Vivian drives a wedge between Kate and Victor's relationship, and tricks Victor into marrying her. Vivian poisons the pilot of a plane transporting Kate, and when the plane crashes on April 24, 1995, Kate is believed dead, but is actually alive.

Kate (now Lauren Koslow) returns to Salem in January 1996, determined to win custody of Philip. Learning that Vivian and Victor are together, Kate seeks revenge. Kate vows to take Victor's Titan Corporation and his son, Philip (still an infant at the time) away from them. Victor suffers a stroke and Vivian is arrested for her schemes. Kate is now in charge of Victor's empire. Billie also returns, closely followed by Franco Kelly (Victor Alfieri) Kate hires Franco to break up Bo and Hope, so Billie can be happy with Bo.

Kate is also now a grandmother to Sami Brady's (Alison Sweeney) son who gave birth to Kate's grandchild, whilst she was away. His name is Will and Sami claims that he is Austin's, but he is actually Lucas's child. Sami misleads everyone in her bid to get Austin to marry her and when the truth of Will's paternity comes out, Sami fights Lucas for custody. Thus; begins an epic battle between Kate and Sami. Sami finds out that Kate was once a prostitute and blackmails Kate. Sami falls in love with Franco and they prepare to marry. Kate wants to stop it, because she fears Lucas will lose Will. Kate tries to blackmail Franco about his mob past, but Franco attacks Kate with a poker on the eve of the wedding. Lucas saves Kate by shooting Franco, who dies instantly, and Kate frames Sami for the killing. At the trial for Franco's death, Sami is convicted and is sentenced to death. As she is about to be executed, Lucas confesses in a bid to save her. However, Kate has just persuaded a dying man to sign a false confession and Sami is saved, and she and Lucas both go free.

Meanwhile, Kate is still battling with Vivian for control over Titan. Kate begins a relationship with Vivian's great-nephew, Nicholas Alamain, but he leaves town. She then attempts to worm her way back into Victor's good graces. However, she blows her chances, when she is caught in flagrante delicto with Mob Boss Vincent Moroni (Carl Weintraub) she conspires with him to kill Victor at the coronation of Greta Von Amberg. The plan accidentally kills Vincent's only child, Angela Moroni (Ayda Field) and causes Vincent to commit suicide. Victor, realizing Kate's plan, flees for his life and fakes his death. He reveals himself to her the night she sets the Kiriakis mansion on fire and attempts to kill him with a poker. Victor escapes, but Lucas is severely burned. Victor kicks Kate out of the house, but does not tell Philip about his mother's murder attempts on him. Philip's plea causes Victor to provide Kate with a small allowance.

Kate gets a job at Basic Black, and begins dating Roman Brady (Josh Taylor) Kate and Roman find out that they are the biological parents of the twins, Rex Brady (Eric Winter) and Cassie Brady (Alexis Thorpe) Roman asks Kate to marry him and she agrees. They have a beautiful wedding, but the reception is shattered when Kate finds Roman's apparently-dead body. She mourns him deeply, but it doesn't stop her from destroying Roman's daughter, Sami's relationship with her son, Lucas. Kate encourages Philip to spend more time with Belle Black (Martha Madison) Cassie is also (apparently) murdered. Her body is found with multiple stab wounds in a Thanksgiving pinata. Kate is found holding the bloody knife and is arrested, but in reality, Cassie and Roman's apparent deaths, as well as several other Salem residents, are staged in a plot by André DiMera (Thaao Penghlis).

Kate begins a relationship with John Black (Drake Hogestyn) after helping him deal with a drug addiction. However, as soon as the John and Kate make plans to marry, both their spouses return to Salem alive. Roman ends things with Kate for good. Lucas and Sami are to marry, but Kate stops the wedding in the nick of time; due to her discovery and revelation that Sami has been disguising herself as a man called "Stan" and selling John the illicit drugs he became addicted to. Kate invites John Black to live with her after Marlena kicks him out of her home. Kate comforts Philip when Belle Black's daughter, Claire Brady, whom Philip believes is his, nut it turns out that she is Shawn-Douglas Brady's. Philip leaves town. She is terrified when he goes missing, but comes back after receiving extensive amounts of surgery. He is granted temporary custody of Claire, but is devastated when Shawn and Belle kidnap her.

Kate, in her ongoing efforts to keep Lucas from marrying Sami, enlists the help of EJ DiMera (James Scott) who is using the alias "EJ Wells", to seduce Sami away from Lucas. Her efforts fail when EJ is revealed to be the son of Stefano DiMera. Lucas and Sami are deeply in love and are set to marry again, and this time Kate fails to stop it, despite her best efforts. Sami and Lucas start their life together despite Kate's interference. In retaliation for their scheming, Lucas turns Kate and EJ in to the FTC for their questionable financial records. Kate turns to Stefano DiMera after learning that she is broke. Stefano provides her with enough money to start her own business called "Kate's Hearth and Home", a Martha Stewart-like brand of housewares. She hires Stefano's son, Tony DiMera (Thaao Penghis) to do the advertising. Kate no longer worries about Lucas and Sami, because Stefano has blackmailed Sami into a marriage with EJ and Sami has fallen in love with him.

Kate turns her attention back to Philip, who is in trouble with John Black and to her granddaughter, Chelsea Brady (Rachel Melvin) who is recovering from surgery. Chelsea's surgery is successful and soon starts dating her surgeon, Daniel Jonas (Shawn Cristian) in November 2008, Kate is diagnosed with stage IV lung cancer and receives bone marrow from Chloe Lane. Lucas begins a relationship with Chloe Lane. Kate learns that Chloe cheated on Lucas with Daniel Jonas and is set on revenge. She poisons her and Chloe is put in a coma. Kate becomes the only suspect and to avoid jail time; she marries Stefano DiMera who destroys the evidence against her. Later, Phillip has a one-night stand with Chloe, resulting in her grandson, Parker being born, one month premature. When the truth comes out, Kate does everything in her power to make sure Chloe doesn't see her son, including driving her to suicide (which failed; due to Phillip saving her) and calling Phillip (as Chloe) using a recording of Chloe's voice that she edited to make Chloe sound like an unfit mother. When Phillip subsequently moves to Chicago with Parker, Kate blames Chloe (although it was actually Kate's own doing) and later, she hires a thug named Quinn; who forces Chloe to become a prostitute; much like Kate was forced to be in her own youth.

On August 31, 2011, Kate announces to Victor plans to resurrect Countess Wilhelmina Cosmetics with brand expansion and new product ideas, under Titan's rule, with Billie's blessing. However, Victor seems apprehensive about the deal, believing Stefano turned down her deal. She later brings back her daughter, Billie to help run the company by her side. She also interacts with new arrival, Ian McAllister (Ian Buchanan) with whom she once had a romantic relationship in Paris. The two fall into bed in April 2012, which she later regrets. Upon Stefano's return from Alamania, he holds a romantic dinner for Kate with all of her favorite foods, then reveals that he knows about her affair with Ian. Kate tries to explain, but Stefano ends their marriage and takes control of Countess Wilhelmina Cosmetics and Kate's Hearth and Home, making Kate's longtime enemy, Sami Brady CEO. Ian then offers Kate a job as co-CEO of MadWorld, to work alongside Madison James as competition against Sami. Kate and Ian continue their relationship as Kate begins to get along with Madison. Stefano is (apparently) murdered and with so many enemies, there are many suspects; such as Kate. However, during a town-wide disaster, when Salem is rocked with a series of explosions, Ian reveals that he is actually the one who is behind the death of Stefano and framing of EJ, and that he only loved Madison and is merely using Kate to take the DiMera fortune. Kate ends their relationship and he is sent to jail; but it is revealed that an imposter of Stefano died, and that Stefano was really alive and held captive by Ian. Stefano fails to make amends with his son, EJ and heads to Europe for business. Kate tracks down Stefano, insisting he give her another chance, but they finalize the divorce, and Kate realizes that she and Stefano are finished.

Kate takes Chad DiMera (Casey Deidrick) under her wing, kind of as a proxy mother, after his own mother dies. Kate supports her grandson, Will (Chandler Massey) when he comes out as gay. Kate also makes amends with Daniel Jonas and updates him on Parker. Kate is challenged in 2013 when Chloe Lane and her mother, Nancy Wesley (Patrika Darbo) return to Salem and it turns out that Parker is actually Daniel's son. Kate eventually starts a secret relationship with Rafe Hernandez (Galen Gering) after they have a drunken one-night stand. She worries that Stefano may threaten Rafe because of this. Kate later breaks things off with Rafe. Kate becomes a great-grandmother when Will has a daughter, named Arianna Horton (Harper and Sydnee Udell) with his ex-girlfriend, Gabi Hernandez (Camilla Banus) Kate offers to have Gabi and Arianna live with her, but Gabi chooses to live with Will and his partner, Sonny, thanking Kate for the offer.

Kate begins a series of ill-fated short-lived romantic relationships with some extremely dubious and villainous men; the drug lord, Clyde Weston, her ex-husband, Victor Kiriakis's no-good half-brother, Deimos Kiriakis, Rafe and Gabi's assassin father, Eduardo Hernandez and then the serial-killer, André DiMera, whom she marries. She runs DiMera Enterprises with Chad (Billy Flynn) and André; until André betrays them, selling them out to her old rival, Vivian Alamain and her ill-begotten son, Stefano DiMera (Tyler Christopher) and then André is killed by Chad's wife, Abigail when she learns that he has betrayed them all. Kate finds out that Vivian is framing Sonny Kiriakis (Freddie Smith) the current CEO of Titan Industries for sexual harassment. When Kate confronts her, Vivian cornered; pulls a gun on her and they scuffle for possession. Vivian is killed and Kate claims the gun went off accidentally, but Salem PD are not so sure, but they do not have enough evidence to charge her. Stefan is certain that Kate murdered his mother, Vivian and sets out to destroy her. Meanwhile, Kate being sacked from DiMera, takes over Vivian's scheme to frame Sonny Kiriakis, in the hope that she can take over Titan when Sonny is inevitably fired. Unbeknownst to anyone; Vivian has been revived and is being held in a secret lab. She returns in September 2019, much to Kate's horror. Vivian later shoots and buries her, but she survives and escapes, eventually making a full recovery.

She later forms a relationship with Jake Lambert but breaks it off with him after learning he had a relationship with Gabi. During this time, her sons Lucas and Philip commit crimes of their own and tries her best to protect them. EJ blackmails her into signing over her shares of DiMera to in exchange for keeping silent for Lucas' kidnapping of Sami, and she asks Victor to help hide away Philip for mental help after he attacks and a frames Brady Black for his disappearance due to a love triangle with Chloe Lane. She soon reconnects with Roman and the two get married again. However, she is poisoned by Orpheus and presumed dead along with Marlena and Kayla Brady, but her body, like theirs, was taken by a revived Bo Brady under Megan Hathaway's orders and brought back to life by Dr. Rolf.

== Reception ==
In 2000, Koslow received a Soap Opera Digest Award nomination for Outstanding Supporting Actress for her portrayal of Kate. In October 2020, Soaps.com editor Charlie Mason placed Kate at number 18 on his list of the 35 most memorable characters from Days of Our Lives, calling the character an "opportunistic prostitute-turned-titan of industry" who has "always applied the first rule of the street to the soap's audience: Ya gotta hook 'em."
