= Curtis Reed (Days of Our Lives) =

- Days of Our Lives character
- Portrayed by: Nick Benedict
- Duration: 1993–1995; 1997; 1999–2001
- First appearance: July 27, 1993
- Last appearance: June 5, 2001
- Created by: James E. Reilly
- Introduced by: Ken Corday; Tom Langan
In-universe information
- Occupation: Mob Hitman; Former jazz player
- Spouse: Kate Roberts (1969–93)
- Children: Austin Reed; Billie Reed
- Grandsons: Noah Reed
- Granddaughters: Chelsea Brady
- Other relatives: Issac Brady

Curtis Reed is a fictional character from the soap opera Days of Our Lives, portrayed by Nick Benedict.

== Storylines ==
He is born Curtis Brown and marries Kate Roberts in 1969 when they are living in Chicago. They have a son and daughter: Austin and Billie Reed. As a jazz musician, Curtis makes several records, but his career is cut short when he became involved with the Mafia and has part of his ring finger cut off. Afterwards, he becomes addicted to drugs and abusive toward his family, at one point raping his daughter. Kate begins having an affair with Bill Horton and later learns she is pregnant with his child. Curtis finds out, beats her up and leaves Kate on the side of the road. He then disappears with their children.

Curtis changes his last name and his children's names; their birth names have never been revealed, but Curtis renamed them Austin and Billie Holiday Reed. Curtis and the kids go from city to city, often changing names due to his criminal activities. While Kate is searching for her children, Curtis contacts her and tells her that their children had died in a car wreck. Years later, he appears in Salem and shoots John Black on Stefano DiMera's orders. Since Curtis did not kill John, DiMera refuses to pay him. An angry Curtis kidnaps Stefano and holds him on Smith Island until Kristen Blake pays Stefano's ransom.

Curtis is shot to death by Stefano on November 10, 1993, in a back alley behind Billie's apartment. He is discovered in the morning by Bo Brady and Wendy Reardon. Due to multiple seemingly conclusive pieces of evidence, Billie is arrested for his murder. It is not until the March 31, 1994, episode that Stefano is revealed to be the shooter. After this, he appeared as a ghost multiple times between May 2, 1995, and June 5, 2001.
