= Austin Peck =

American actor (born 1971)

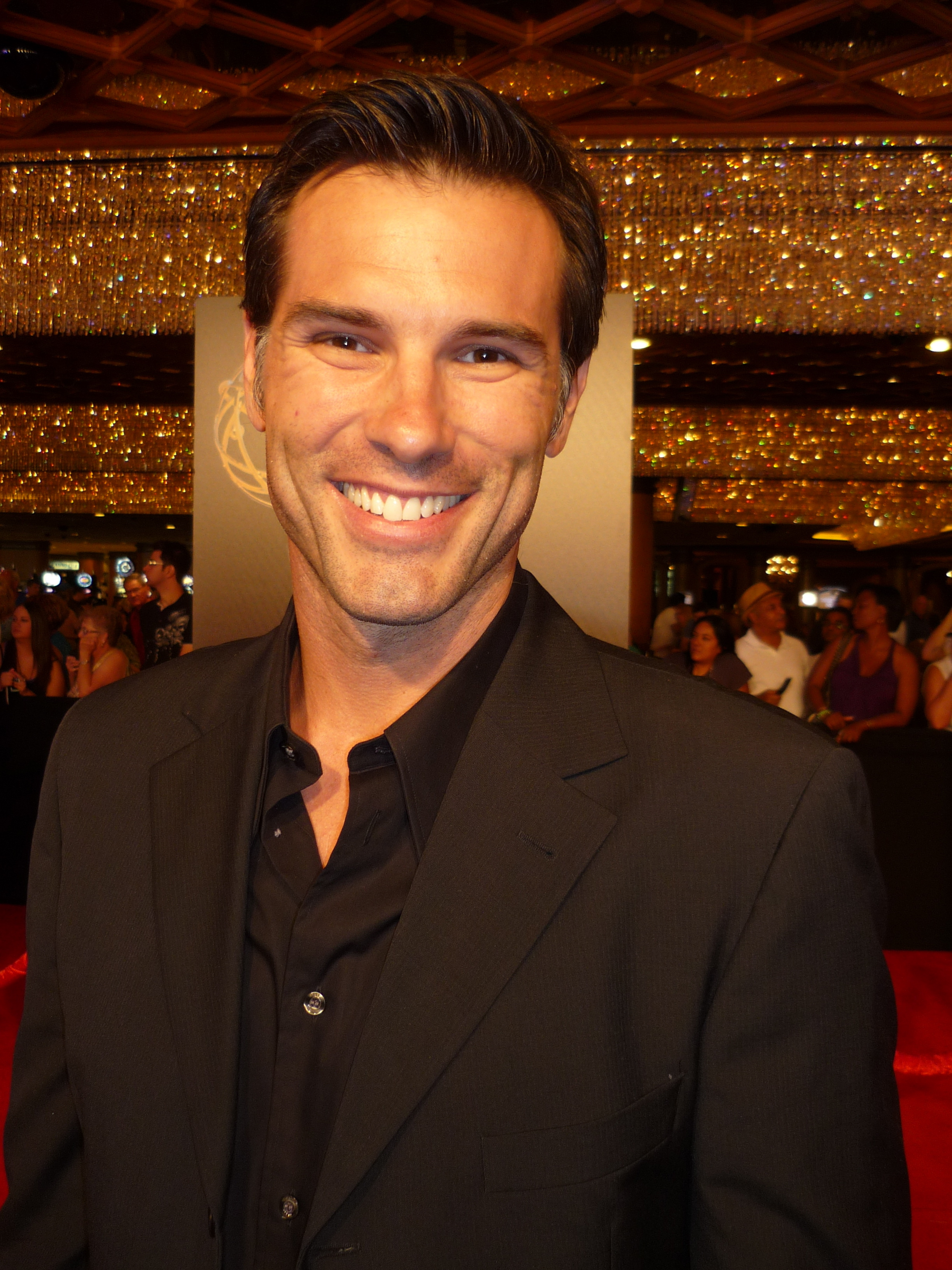
Peck at the 2010 Daytime Emmy Awards.

Austin Peck (born April 9, 1971) is an American actor. He is best known for his work in daytime soap operas.

== Personal life ==
Peck was born in Honolulu, Hawaii, and moved to San Francisco at age eight after his parents divorced. He briefly attended Santa Monica High School where he played football as a linebacker on the fresh/sophomore team in 1986–1987. He left school to pursue acting and did not graduate from Santa Monica in 1989. He began modeling and appeared in magazines Esquire, GQ and Vogue.

In June 2010, Peck and his former As the World Turns co-star Terri Conn officially came out as a couple at the 37th Annual Daytime Emmy Awards. Their relationship was covered in the February 15, 2011, and March 8, 2011, issues of Soap Opera Digest magazine. The February Valentine's Day issue included an interview with Peck, covering his move to One Life to Live, along with his relationship with Conn. The issue includes two candid photos of the couple, as well as a cover shot with the caption, "Exclusive: Real-Life Loves Reunite."

The couple have two daughters, Keira Grace Peck (born November 2012) and Morgan Theresa Peck (born July 2015). Austin Peck is also an accomplished martial artist with experience in Shotokan, Kyokushin, Goju-Ryu, Taekwondo, Judo, Brazilian Jiu-Jitsu, Shaolin Kung Fu, and Jeet Kune Do.

== Professional background ==
Peck is best known for his role as Austin Reed on the daytime soap opera Days of Our Lives from April 13, 1995, to April 5, 2002, and from September 20, 2005, to October 26, 2006, and again from January 11, 2017, to February 12, 2017. Before being cast on Days of Our Lives, Peck alongside fellow actor Bryan Dattilo auditioned for the role of Tommy Oliver of the hit television series Mighty Morphin Power Rangers but the role was given to Jason David Frank instead.

Peck was a recast to the role, and succeeded Patrick Muldoon for the role of Austin. Peck has become the most-associated with the role of Austin and became a fan favorite during his time on the show, reportedly getting the most fan mail of anyone in the Days cast. He appeared on the cover of Playgirl and YM. Peck, along with Days actress Christie Clark, who plays Carrie, won the Soap Opera Digest Award for Hottest Romance.

In November 2006, Peck relocated to New York City to assume the role of Brad Snyder on the CBS daytime drama As the World Turns. He first aired in January 2007. In August 2009, it was revealed that Peck would be released from his contract and his character was killed off in October of that year. Peck continued to air as Brad's ghost through December 2009.

Peck has guest starred on Sabrina, the Teenage Witch, Charmed, The District, Are You A Serial Killer, as well as the 2006 movie Dating Games People Play and 2009's The Blue Tooth Virgin. He has also appeared in the acclaimed off-Broadway play The Irish Curse.

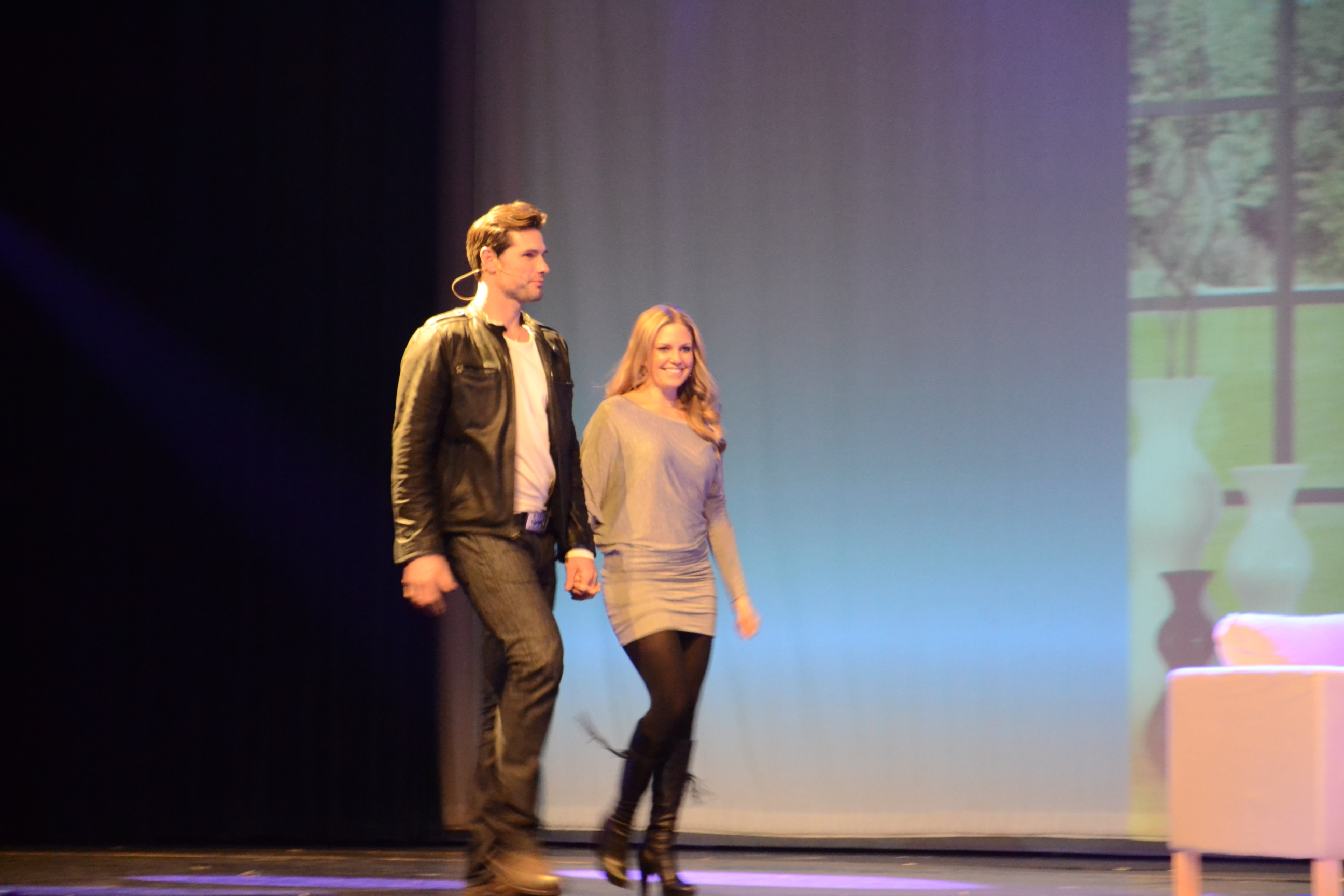
Peck with his wife Terri Conn

In January 2011, it was announced that Peck would join the cast of One Life to Live as porn producer Rick Powers.

Daytime roles

- Austin Reed on Days of Our Lives (April 13, 1995 – April 5, 2002; September 20, 2005 – October 26, 2006; January 11, 2017 – February 12, 2017)
- Brad Snyder on As the World Turns (January 19, 2007 – December 25, 2009)
- Rick Powers on One Life to Live (March 25, 2011 – January 12, 2012)
