= Billie Reed =

Fictional character

- Days of Our Lives character
- Lisa Rinna as Billie Reed
- Portrayed by: Lisa Rinna (1992–1995, 2002–2003, 2012–2021); Krista Allen (1996–1999); Julie Pinson (2004–2008)
- Duration: 1992–1999; 2002–2008; 2012–2013; 2018; 2021
- First appearance: September 18, 1992
- Last appearance: September 10, 2021
- Created by: Sheri Anderson
- Introduced by: Ken Corday and Tom Langan (1992); Ken Corday and Stephen Wyman (2002); Ken Corday, Lisa de Cazotte and Greg Meng (2012)
- Spin-off appearances: Days of Our Lives: Night Sins (1993); Days of Our Lives: Beyond Salem (2021)
- Krista Allen as Billie Reed

- Julie Pinson as Billie Reed
In-universe information
- Occupation: ISA Agent; Cosmetics employee; Businesswoman; Security guard; Police officer; Detective
- Family: Roberts
- Parents: Curtis Reed; Kate Roberts
- Stepfather: Victor Kiriakis (1993–1995); Roman Brady (2003–2005); Stefano DiMera (2009–2012); André DiMera (2017–2018)
- Brothers: Austin Reed
- Half-brothers: Lucas Horton; Philip Kiriakis; Rex Brady
- Half-sisters: Cassie Brady
- Husband: Bo Brady (1995, 1997–1998)
- Daughters: Chelsea Brady
- Grandchildren: Isaac Brady
- Nieces and nephews: Will Horton; Allie Horton; Tyler Kiriakis; Noah Reed; Emily Lockhart
- Other relatives: Arianna Horton; Henry Horton

Billie Reed is a fictional character from the NBC soap opera Days of Our Lives, created by writer Sheri Anderson and most prominently portrayed by Lisa Rinna.

== Casting ==
The role of Billie Reed was originally played by Lisa Rinna on September 18, 1992, who then left the role on September 28, 1995 to star as Taylor McBride in Melrose Place. The role was recast with Krista Allen from September 6, 1996 to November 5, 1999. When Allen vacated the role, rumors arose that ex-Port Charles actress, Julie Pinson, would take over. However, Rinna was announced as returning for a short-term stint beginning July 3, 2002 until her departure on January 8, 2003. In 2004, two years following the online rumors, Pinson was hired after Rinna declined another return. Pinson debuted as Billie on September 13, 2004, and vacated the role four years later on February 5, 2008.

In 2011, it was announced that Rinna would reprise the role of Billie and returned on March 9, 2012. In August 2012, it was confirmed by Huffington Post that Rinna would once again leave the series to develop a panel-focused talk show. Rinna taped her then-final episode on October 9, which aired on January 30, 2013.

In September 2017, it was revealed that Rinna would once again return to the role of Billie, airing some time in 2018. Rinna made her return from February 13 to February 22, 2018.

== Storylines ==
=== 1992–99 ===
Billie Reed comes to Salem in 1992 as a professional singer, but her cocaine addiction ruins that opportunity. Billie believes her father is dead and has never known her mother. Her only known relative in Salem is her brother, Austin Reed. Luckily, Carrie Brady befriends her and gives Billie a place to stay. It takes a while before Billie can get clean and rid her life of past demons.

Eventually, Billie decides to turn her life around and starts her own cosmetics company, Countess Wilhelmina. Kate Roberts buys out Countess Wilhelmina to spite Billie. Later that year, Billie befriends Tony DiMera. He buys up 49% of Titan Industries and then brings Billie in to run the Countess Wilhelmina division.

Billie's father, Curtis Reed, who had been presumed dead, returns. Curtis, who got Billie addicted to drugs as a young girl and raped her, is eventually murdered in November 1993 and Billie is arrested for killing him. However, Billie refuses to tell Bo Brady how she knows Curtis and she makes her brother, Austin, keep quiet. Billie thinks that if Bo learns the truth, he won't love her. Nevertheless, Bo falls in love with Billie during the trial and is determined to prove that she is innocent.

Billie and Austin are both shocked when they learn Kate was married to Curtis Reed. Eventually Billie admits that Curtis is her father. It is revealed Stefano DiMera killed Curtis in self-defense and framed Billie. Billie is set free and Bo tells her that he loves her no matter what. Billie and Austin are also reunited with Kate, the mother who they thought had abandoned them. Kate tells them that Curtis had taken them from her and she believed they had all been killed in a car crash. Curtis actually faked their deaths and changed their names after abandoning Kate at the side of the road, pregnant with their half-brother, Lucas Roberts.

In May 1994, Bo and Billie discover a woman named Gina who looks just like Bo's first wife, Hope. She has no memories of her past and Bo is convinced there is no way Hope could have survived the explosion all those years ago. Bo and Billie become engaged in December 1994.

Bo and Billie try to marry in January 1995, but the "Desecrator" strikes, and a falling chandelier almost kills them. They try again, but learn that they cannot marry if there is any chance that Gina could be Hope. To help them, Gina signs a paper declaring that Hope is dead, and Bo and Billie are finally married in February 1995. Gina opens a puzzle box and is proven to be Hope Brady. Bo and Hope get a divorce so Billie and Bo can marry legally. But soon after the divorce papers are signed, Billie realizes that Bo is still in love with Hope, so she leaves Salem in September 1995 to let them be together as a family with their son.

Billie returns a year later in September 1996 and moves into the Kiriakis Mansion. She begins to date Franco Kelly, which upsets Bo, who is now getting ready to remarry Hope. Bo insists that Franco is dangerous, but Hope accuses him of being jealous. The night before Bo and Hope's wedding, Bo gets caught in the middle of a massive storm and ends stranded on an island with Billie. Desperate to make it to his wedding, Bo tries to swim to shore, but almost drowns. Billie rescues him and helps him back to the cabin. Bo is in a hypothermic state, so to help him get warm, Billie strips all their clothing and snuggles close to Bo. Hope, looking for Bo, arrives in time to witness the close encounter and jumps to the wrong conclusion. Upset, she calls off the wedding, much to Bo's despair, and he vows to get Hope back.

Billie soon discovers that Bo is working undercover in an effort to expose and bring down drug lord J.L. King in February 1997. Billie gets in over her head with J.L. King and is forced to pretend to be Bo's girlfriend or risk Bo getting killed. They are also forced to keep up their ruse in front of Hope; otherwise, their cover would be blown. Bo reminds Billie that he only sees her as a friend and Hope is the only woman he loves.

Bo and Billie are forced to travel to Rome with King, where he has arranged a wedding for them to test them. Coincidentally, Hope and Franco are also in Rome during that time and King invites them to the ceremony. To prove loyalty to J.L., Bo agrees. The wedding goes off without a hitch, to Billie's delight and Hope's devastation (June 1997).

King is arrested in Rome soon afterwards. One of his goons, Max, kidnaps Billie and ties her to a bed where he injects her with drugs. While under the influence, she sees visions of her dead father, Curtis, who tormented her. Bo finds Billie and saves her from becoming hooked on drugs again. Bo, believing Hope has moved on and no longer loves him, makes love to Billie. As a result of their lovemaking, Billie discovers she is pregnant (January 1998).

Despite Billie's pregnancy and his commitment to be there for the baby, Bo still longs for Hope. Billie taunts Hope about her and Bo being lovers in Rome, even though she knows Bo really only loves Hope. Hope begins looking for her missing years as Gina and Bo helps her. Bo and Hope begin to reconcile. Around five months into her pregnancy, Billie follows Bo and Hope to New Orleans and is accosted by two men. As a result, Billie goes into premature labor and gives birth to a stillborn daughter, whom she names Georgia. She buries her daughter in the swamp.

She then fakes a fall after a fight with Hope and blames Hope for her miscarriage. The guilt Hope has about Billie losing her baby keeps Bo and Hope apart. Bo is there for Billie during the loss of their daughter, but still tells her that Hope is the one he loves and wants to build a future with. Billie is outraged. Everyone finds out she had lied about the miscarriage and Bo would have nothing to do with her. Billie stays in Salem a little longer, and dates Roman Brady. After being rejected by Nicholas Alamain, who is in love with Kate, she decides she's had enough of Salem and moves back to Paris in October 1999.

=== 2002–2008 ===
Hope's disdain for Billie only grew over time. When Billie returns to Salem in 2002 and joins the police force, it only gets worse. Billie swears her motives are pure and not to create more trouble for Bo and Hope. She has a short-lived relationship with Jack Deveraux that never really gets off the ground. However, her real reason for returning is to cause more problems for Bo and Hope. She assists Larry Welch in kidnapping Hope and Zack because she believes Larry is working for the ISA. However, she can't stand seeing what this was doing to Bo and when she goes to stand up against Larry, he shoots her. Fortunately, she survives and leaves Salem when she is released from the hospital in early 2003 to join the ISA in London.

When the Salem stalker murders begin, she has a message for Bo saying she knows who the killer is but she goes missing around that same time.

When Bo helps rescue the victims of the Salem Stalker, he bumps into Billie on the mysterious island. Together they help rescue the others, and upon their return to Salem, Billie makes the shocking discovery that their daughter Georgia, who she thought had died in childbirth, is still alive. In fact, she is Chelsea Benson, one of Abby Deveraux's friends. When Chelsea's adoptive parents are killed in a car accident, Billie reveals the truth and has Chelsea move in with her.

Hope is not thrilled by yet another link between Billie and Bo, but tries to remain supportive. However, when Bo and Hope's son Zack is killed in a car accident, everyone soon learns that Chelsea was the driver, and thus responsible. Billie is desperate to protect Chelsea and Bo is torn between the two women in his life. At one point, Chelsea manipulates Billie into making it appear that Bo has slept with her in a hotel and arranges for Hope to discover this truth. Billie deeply regrets this and admits to it in court when Hope tries to divorce Bo.

Billie repeatedly states she believes Bo and Hope belong together and will not try to get back with Bo, against Chelsea's wishes. She finds herself involved with another man who is not exactly available: Steve "Patch" Johnson. Steve feels very pressured by Kayla's hopes that he will remember their past, and he rebels by starting to see Billie.

While she is drunk, she has sex with Nick Fallon, who has developed strong feelings for her daughter Chelsea. Her falls from the wagon didn't last long. She makes amends with Chelsea and is working at Salem University as head of security. She uses her connections to help her younger half-brother Philip Kiriakis find his missing son, Tyler. She works on finding the campus rapist. Unbeknownst to her, Ford Decker is already dead.

Billie leaves town in the wake of the death of Ford Decker. Victor gives her a job at Titan in England, after she is fired from the university. Billie is in a car accident, and has to have her mom, Kate and her daughter, Chelsea come to London to help her recover. Chelsea stays with Billie while Kate goes back home. Chelsea then returns home to Salem and reunites with Max. They get engaged and leave the show with the storyline of living in London with Billie, helping her to get better.

=== 2012–2013 ===
In March 2012, a fully recovered Billie came to Salem, seemingly to help her mom run Countess Wilhemina Cosmetics. However, it was soon revealed that Billie was back working for the ISA and was assigned to get information on Stefano. Billie convinced her mom to let her move into the DiMera Mansion.

But, Stefano was actually working as a CIA informant, so her investigation came to a halt. And, when Stefano and Kate's relationship fell apart, Billie stayed in town to support her mom and work with her at Mad World Cosmetics. But Billie and Kate eventually grew apart. Frustrated with Kate's scheming, Billie decided to take a new job in Europe. But, she made peace with Kate before she left.

On May 22, 2013, Kate asked Gabi if she took pictures of Arianna, since her great-aunt, Billie, wanted to see her.

=== 2018 ===
Billie briefly appeared in Salem in February 2018, working alongside John Black in an attempt to foil a rogue ISA plot to kill Steve Johnson. Whilst there she got to see her newly found-to-be-alive nephew, Will Horton.

=== 2021 ===
On July 26, 2021, it was revealed that Rinna would resume her role as Billie on the upcoming Days Of Our Lives spin-off show Days of Our Lives: Beyond Salem.
