= Rich Men, Single Women =

- Genre: Comedy; Romance
- Written by: Barbara Esensten; James Harmon Brown; Rita Mae Brown
- Directed by: Elliot Silverstein
- Starring: Suzanne Somers; Heather Locklear; Deborah Adair; Joel Higgins; Larry Wilcox
- Music by: Charles Fox
- Country of origin: United States
- Original language: English

Production
- Executive producer: Dennis Hammer
- Producers: Douglas S. Cramer; Aaron Spelling; E. Duke Vincent
- Production location: Los Angeles
- Cinematography: Albert J. Dunk
- Editor: Kenneth Miller
- Running time: 105 minutes
- Production company: Spelling Productions

Original release
- Network: ABC
- Release: January 29, 1990

Rich Men, Single Women is a 1990 American made-for-television romantic comedy film directed by Elliot Silverstein.

== Plot ==
Three women team up with the common goal of marrying millionaires.

== Cast ==
- Suzanne Somers as Paige
- Heather Locklear as Tori
- Deborah Adair as Susan
- Joel Higgins as Nicky Loomis
- Larry Wilcox as Mark
- John Allen Nelson as Travis
- James Karen
