= Gina Von Amberg =

- Days of our Lives character
- Kristian Alfonso as Gina Von Amberg
- Portrayed by: Kristian Alfonso (1998–2020); Sasha Higgins (2021)
- Duration: 1998–2001; 2012; 2017–2021
- First appearance: December 1, 1998
- Last appearance: September 6, 2021
- Created by: Sally Sussman Morina
- Introduced by: Ken Corday and Tom Langan (1998); Ken Corday, Lisa de Cazotte and Greg Meng (2012); Ken Corday, Albert Alarr and Greg Meng (2017)
- Spin-off appearances: Days of Our Lives: Beyond Salem (2021)
In-universe information
- Other names: Hope Williams Brady; Countess Elsa
- Occupation: Princess; Art thief; Art forger
- Spouse: Phillip Von Amberg
- Children: Greta Von Amberg

Princess Gina Von Amberg is a fictional character on the American soap opera Days of Our Lives, and its spinoff series Days of Our Lives: Beyond Salem. The role was portrayed from 1998 to 2000 by Kristian Alfonso, who also plays Hope Williams Brady on the series. In addition to being a separate character who was Hope's doppelganger, "Princess Gina" was also a persona exhibited by Hope herself while under mind control. Alfonso reprised the role of Princess Gina after the character's death, both as visions of the real Gina in 2001, 2019 and 2020, as well as Hope behaving as Gina in 2012, 2019, and 2020 (and in non-canonical Halloween episodes in 2017 and 2018). Sasha Higgins stepped into the role for one episode of Days of Our Lives: Beyond Salem in 2021.

== Character background ==
Much of the narrative of Gina's life was introduced via flashback scenes and dialogue. Gina was married to Prince Philip Von Amberg, hence the title "princess". She gave birth to a daughter, Greta, soon after Prince Philip died in a yachting accident. Princess Gina became a skilled art thief and forger hired and manipulated by Stefano DiMera. In the 1980s, Stefano partnered her with his brainwashed pawn, John Black, with whom she fell in love. In 1985, Stefano altered John's personality and reassigned him. Believing John dead, Gina became mentally ill and no longer wished to paint, becoming useless to Stefano. He imprisoned her at her home, Chateau de Reves, in the countryside outside Paris. Stefano obtained a replacement for Gina by abducting the presumed-dead Hope Brady, who resembled Gina, and implanting a microchip that gave her Gina's memories and personality. Hope lived as Gina, Stefano's art thief and forger, for several years in the early 1990s until Stefano decided to deactivate the chip. Hope returned to her normal life, but with amnesia of her years as Gina.

== Storylines ==
In 1998, the character Greta (Julianne Morris) reveals that Princess Gina was her mother, and that in 1990 she was informed of Gina's death. In actuality, a delusional Gina has remained imprisoned in France, with only her devoted manservant, Kurt, for a companion as she waits for John to rescue her. In 1999, after learning of Gina's history with Stefano, Greta decides to learn more about her mother's life and death; she and her friend Eric Brady travel to France and visit Chateau de Reves. Kurt tries to keep Gina and Greta apart, fearing for Gina's sanity, but Gina ultimately discovers a sleeping Greta and reveals herself to her. However, Gina's haggard appearance frightens Greta; the incident leads Gina to realize that her mental illness caused her to lose track of the passage of time, while Greta is unsure if she dreamed the encounter.

Gina began to reclaim her mind, and was eventually allowed by her manservant, Kurt, to attend a ball thrown in her honor. It was at this ball that Princess Gina met her imposter, Hope, which she was under the control of the computer chip once again in 1999 due to Stefano reactivating Gina's memories and emotions, including Hope's memories of being Gina, however Hope still retained her memories as Hope, thanks to Stefano needing her to pretend to be Hope when needed, which caused Hope to conflict with if she is Hope or Gina. Disguising herself as Countess Elsa Schwengel, Gina and Hope talk and she eventually learns that John was still alive and living in Salem. Hope eventually was able to fight Gina as her alter ego out of her mind and body thanks to Bo reminding her that she is Hope, but still retained Gina's memories and was going to use them to help the authorities arrest Stefano. However, this fails because Gina then lured Hope to the chateau, where she imprisoned her, during this time Stefano deactivates the computer chip in Hope's brain through satellite and then Hope has no memories of being Gina and is completely Hope again. Gina then had plastic surgery, made her way to Salem, and impersonated Hope. When Gina arrived in Salem, she realized that John would never leave his wife, Marlena Evans. She then decides to marry Hope's love, Bo Brady, who thought she was Hope. The two planned to marry on New Year's Eve 1999.

On the day of her wedding to Bo, she tried to shoot Marlena Evans and Bo and Hope's son Shawn-Douglas. In Bo's struggle to get the gun away from her, she is shot and died of her wounds on January 14, 2000. She also appeared to her daughter Greta in 2001, when she was completing the tasks necessary for her to become the new Princess Von Amberg, to Marlena Evans in 2019, when she coded after being shot by Xander Kiriakis, on the orders of Kristen DiMera, and to Hope Brady in 2020 in a dream after Kayla Johnson removed the chip in her brain that was causing her to behave as Gina.

Gina returns in March 2012, as an alternate personality of Hope's, after being hoaxed and coaxed out of her subconscious by Stefano through hypnosis, to reclaim a Fabergé-like egg that had been stolen from him; something only Gina and John Black as (The Pawn)/Father John can recover for him.

It is revealed in Days of Our Lives: Beyond Salem that Princess Gina (really a brainwashed Hope) stole the famous Alamainian peacock in 1991, and fenced the jewels.
