= Cassie Brady =

- Days of Our Lives character
- Portrayed by: Alexis Thorpe
- Duration: 2002–2005
- First appearance: July 8, 2002
- Last appearance: June 7, 2005
- Created by: Peter Brash and Paula Cwikly
- Introduced by: Ken Corday and Stephen Wyman
In-universe information
- Other names: Cassie DiMera
- Occupation: University Student
- Family: Brady; Roberts
- Parents: Roman Brady; Kate Roberts
- Stepfather: Stefano DiMera (2009–12); André DiMera (2017–18)
- Brothers: Rex Brady
- Half-brothers: Eric Brady; Austin Reed; Lucas Horton; Philip Kiriakis
- Half-sisters: Carrie Brady Reed; Sami Brady; Billie Reed
- Grandparents: Shawn Brady; Caroline Brady
- Aunts and uncles: Kimberly Brady; Kayla Brady; Bo Brady; Frankie Brady (adoptive); Max Brady (adoptive)
- Nieces and nephews: Will Horton; Allie Horton; Johnny DiMera; Sydney DiMera; Chelsea Brady; Tyler Kiriakis; Noah Reed; Emily Lockhart; Mackenzie Horton
- First cousins: Andrew Donovan; Theresa Donovan; Stephanie Johnson; Joey Johnson; Shawn-Douglas Brady; Chelsea Brady; Zack Brady; Ciara Brady

Cassie Brady is a fictional character from the NBC daytime soap opera Days of Our Lives. Cassie and her twin brother, Rex, first appeared in Salem on the Fourth of July for meteor shower in 2002. They believed in the story of being aliens and were later revealed to be the children of Roman Brady and Kate Roberts.

== Casting ==
Created by Peter Brash and Paula Quickly, the role of Cassie was cast with Alexis Thorpe, who had previously portrayed Rianna Miner on The Young and the Restless. Thorpe appeared as a contract player from July 8, 2002, to December 1, 2003, at which point the character was believed to have been murdered. However, she reappeared on April 27, 2004, alive and well, making infrequent appearances until June 7, 2005, without a proper exit.

== Storylines ==
Cassie and her twin brother, Rex, crash-landed in Salem during a meteor shower and were originally believed to be aliens. The twins had matching tattoos resembling the Phoenix, which called their connection to Stefano DiMera and John Black into question. As time went on, they were believed to be the children of Tony DiMera and Marlena Evans, who were taken away as toddlers and genetically manipulated by Stefano's scientific genius, Wilhelm Rolf. However, this was proven false. In reality, a sperm sample had been stolen from Roman Brady during his years as Stefano's captive and was combined with eggs taken from Kate Roberts.

At first, Cassie pursues and eventually kisses Shawn-Douglas Brady, unaware that he is her cousin. Cassie then becomes involved with Lucas Roberts, also unaware that he is her half-brother, almost sleeping with him before learning of their relationship. The twins keep their true parentage secret for a while in hopes of joining the DiMera family. Soon after their secret is revealed publicly, Cassie is killed by the "Salem Stalker" and her stabbed body is staged inside a Thanksgiving piñata. Kate is arrested after being found holding a bloody knife, but the real killer was a mind-controlled Marlena. Months later, Cassie and the other victims are found alive on a remote island, "Melaswen," in a recreation of Salem. Shortly after returning to the real Salem, Cassie is last seen leaving the main floor of the Brady Pub to go upstairs. It is later revealed that she has moved to Chicago.

== Reception ==
In 2020, Belinda Jepsen from Mamamia put Rex and Cassie's introduction on her list of the five "most ridiculous storylines" that occurred on Days of Our Lives, calling the pair "two ridiculously attractive youths".

In 2021, Richard Simms from Soaps She Knows put Cassie on his list of the most hated soap opera characters, commenting that "Maybe it was that she and brother Rex were introduced as aluminum-foil-wrapped aliens. Maybe it was that she very nearly bedded half brother Lucas Horton. Whatever the reason, by the time Cassie's supposedly dead body fell out of a pinata, viewers were pretty much over her. Though she — like the other Salem Stalker victims — later turned up alive, the character's days were numbered, and she left town soon after."

== Source link ==
- soapcentral.com|DAYS Online
- Cassie at soapcentral.com
