= The Pistol: The Birth of a Legend =

1991 US sports film by Frank C. Schröder

- Directed by: Frank C. Schröder
- Written by: Darrel Campbell
- Music by: Brent Havens
- Release date: January 17, 1991
- Running time: 104 minutes
- Country: United States
- Language: English

The Pistol: The Birth of a Legend is a 1991 biographical sports film about the 1959 8th grade basketball season of Pete Maravich and his father Press Maravich. The film, which presents his early beginnings and the origin of the "Pistol" nickname, is set in Clemson, SC, where the elder Maravich served as head coach for Clemson Tigers men's basketball. The film is regarded as a family film that is listed by several Christian book and film clubs. The film was originally released on January 17, 1991, in theatres, on November 8, 2005, on DVD, and on November 11, 2013, on Blu-ray. The film was produced soon after Pete Maravich's 1988 death.

== Plot ==
The film shows 5-foot-2-inch (1.57 m) Maravich's efforts to make the D. W. Daniel High School varsity team as an eighth grader as he deals with racially charged issues in the Deep South of the 1950s. Press Maravich serves as his son's drill sergeant, motivator, coach and cheerleader.

Set in 1959 Clemson, SC, the film begins with Pete Maravich shooting in the back yard as his father, Press, impresses the importance of focusing on a goal with dedication and diligence. In addition to motivational talks, Press gave Pete a range of drills and technique advice. At school, Pete perceives himself as an outcast even on the basketball team, where at one point he was benched for ten games. Pete believed in himself and his father stood behind him. Pete begins dribbling the basketball regularly and in strange situations such as during his bike rides while he keeps it with him around the clock. Pete's coach looks down on Pete's fancy basketball skills as the kind of thing that the blacks from the bad part of town do. Eventually, when Pete is given the chance, he wins the game. Because he shot the basketball from the hip, he earned the nickname "Pistol Pete". Even after winning the state championship, Press convinced the coach and team that they cannot really be champions without beating the all-black Cleveland High School in an unofficial contest. Press concluded the film with the advice to "give the fans a show they'll never forget, and they'll come back again and again."

== Cast ==
- Millie Perkins as Helen Maravich
- Nick Benedict as Press Maravich
- Boots Garland as Coach Vern Pendleton
- Tom Lester as Pete Maravich (Adult)
- Adam Guier as Pete Maravich

== Production ==
The Pistol: The Birth of a Legend was produced soon after Pete Maravich's January 5, 1988 death when producers decided to capture the story of his legend. It was a low budget movie.

== Critical commentary ==
In 2014, Complex named it the 19th best basketball movie of all time. Hal Erickson of AllMovie said that "The film is for the most part an exercise in joie de vivre" and he lauded the film for making the most of a small budget. Using words like "uplifting" and "heartwarming", CD Universe says the film depicts the devotion of a father to his son and of a boy to the game of basketball. Ted Baehr's Movieguide depicts Maravich as a misfit at school, while his father attempts to give him dreams at home. Movieguide describes the film as subtle with emphasis on the value of sharing of special moments in life.

== See also ==
- List of basketball films
