= Lucas Horton =

Fictional character from the soap opera Days of Our Lives

- Days of Our Lives character
- Portrayed by: Bryan Dattilo
- Duration: 1993–2010; 2012–present
- First appearance: April 15, 1993
- Last appearance: January 1, 2026
- Created by: Sheri Anderson and James E. Reilly
- Introduced by: Ken Corday and Tom Langan (1993); Ken Corday, Lisa de Cazotte and Greg Meng (2012)
In-universe information
- Other names: Lucas Desmond Roberts; Lucas Desmond Horton
- Occupation: Businessman undercover agent
- Family: Horton; Roberts
- Father: Bill Horton
- Mother: Kate Roberts
- Half-brothers: Mike Horton; Austin Reed; Rex Brady; Philip Kiriakis
- Half-sisters: Jennifer Horton; Billie Reed; Cassie Brady
- Spouse: Nicole Walker (1999–2002) (Note: Their marriage was later deemed invalid as it was revealed that Nicole was still legally married to Trent Robbins); Carrie Brady (2006); Sami Brady (2007); Chloe Lane (2009)
- Children: Will Horton; Allie Horton
- Grandsons: Henry Horton
- Granddaughters: Arianna Horton
- Grandparents: Tom Horton; Alice Horton
- Uncles: Tom Horton, Jr.; Mickey Horton
- Aunts: Addie Horton; Marie Horton
- Nephews: Jeremy Horton; JJ Deveraux; Tyler Kiriakis; Noah Reed
- Nieces: Abigail Deveraux; Chelsea Brady; Emily Lockhart
- First cousins: Sandy Horton; Jessica Blake; Steven Olson; Julie Williams; Hope Brady; Melissa Horton (adoptive); Sarah Horton (legal); Janice Barnes (foster)

Lucas Horton is a fictional character on the American daytime soap opera Days of Our Lives, portrayed by Bryan Dattilo. Introduced in 1993 as Lucas Roberts, the military cadet son of businesswoman Kate Roberts, he later discovers he is the son of Bill Horton. Lucas was once in a relationship and married to Sami Brady, his mother Kate strongly disapproved of the relationship and repeatedly tried to derail it. In 2007, Lucas changed his and his son's surname to his father's surname. Lucas and Sami are the parents of Will Horton and Allie Horton, as well as the grandparents of Arianna Horton and Henry Horton. Lucas has also been married to Carrie Brady, Chloe Lane and Nicole Walker. An important storyline for Lucas is his recurring battle with alcoholism.

== Casting ==
"I was definitely sending out the message I didn't care. I was burned out and not giving my all. I felt the development of my character wasn't going anywhere. I was cracking a lot of jokes. It all came off like I was mocking the show and the work everyone was doing. It was just my insecure way of handling the pressure but it was stupid of me to burn a bridge like that, with a show that's done so much for me, a show that's been my life. It was just the dumbest, most egotistical thing. And I really regret it. I want to prove I can make the most of this second chance."

— Dattilo on his behavior over his February 2010 exit.

In late 1992, Days of our Lives began to introduce a new teen scene to appeal to younger viewers featuring long-time characters Sami and Carrie Brady, and the arrivals of Austin Reed and Jonah Carver. In early 1993, the show decided to expand by introducing Jamie Caldwell, Wendy Reardon, and Lucas Roberts. The role of Lucas was originated by actor Bryan Dattilo, who made his first appearance in the episode originally airing on April 15, 1993. Dattilo remained with the series until February 2001 when the actor was abruptly fired from the series.

Executive producer Ken Corday spoke out on the firing, stating that it was simply to give the character of Lucas a "rest". Later in November 2001, it was reported that Dattilo was to return to the series in time for February Sweeps for a temporary time. Executive producer Corday later confirmed that Dattilo's stay on the soap could be extended for an unknown amount of time.

After a summer hiatus, Dattilo was announced to return to the soap again around September. Dattilo remained with the soap for eight years until it was announced in December 2009 that the actor would leave once again in February 2010. Dattilo later confirmed that he quit the series of his own accord and was certainly not fired.

Dattilo released a statement, saying:

I have no bad feelings at all toward anybody[..] I don't feel like I've been wronged. I just kind of feel like it happened because it needed to happen. The show is a great show and always will be. I hope it lasts long and I hope that the ratings are soaring and I wish nothing but good for everyone there. I love everyone there. I had one more episode to do after the vacation when Gary [Tomlin, co-executive producer] told me they weren't renewing my contract. And in the scenes, I literally had two lines and came in at the end of the scene and said something to Rafe like, 'Leave Sami alone,' then walked away. It was very uneventful and Gary even said, 'You don't need to come in for that last episode if you don't want to.' At the time, I was like, 'No, I'll come in; that's cool.' And then when I got home and read the episode, where I really didn't say much and nothing happened, I thought, 'If that's going to be my last episode, I don't want to go out like that.

In May 2011, the soap announced its choice to reinvent the series and fire its current head writer Dena Higley for former Passions head writers Marlene McPherson and Darrell Ray Thomas, Jr. Speculation lead to rumors of Dattilo possibly returning to the series. In December 2011, it was speculated that Dattilo was seen at NBC Universal Burbank Studios, where the series is filmed; it was further announced that Dattilo would return as part of the reboot. Series co-executive producer Greg Meng said:

We are very excited Bryan Dattilo, who has been greatly missed on the show, is back in Salem[..] The reset of DAYS is about bringing core families back together, rekindling old romances, and sparking new ones.

Datillo returned on February 29, 2012. In an interview with Michael Fairman, Dattilo said of his return and the fans' reaction of his return:

That is awesome to know about the fans! I feel a lot different. I think before I was always into having a good time and just doing the work, but mostly having a good time. That was my priority. But now that I am back, I am just trying to sink into the work as much as I can, and make it as good as I can. I want to go home at the end of the day and feel proud of what I’ve done and not thinking that there was something I should’ve done. I don't like to go home feeling regretful about my job. It's hard because it's every day on a soap opera. You can't do great every day but I am trying, as opposed to before when I would just laugh off a bad day. I am trying to take the job more seriously and make it about the work and not be the "comic relief" so much because people then tend to have you fall into that role everyday. But the people at DAYS are great. I am working with a lot of familiar faces and since I was gone, a lot of people came back to the show as well. It's cool to see everyone, and you don't realize how much you miss certain people until you go away for a couple of years. Everyone from the people who run the show, to the Associate Directors, to the cameramen, to the sound people, to hair and make-up; they really become your family when you are here. It's great to be back and to figure out where I fit in the best and where I can plug myself in the best.

In June 2018, it was reported that Dattilo will be exiting the role of Lucas; making his last appearance on November 15, 2018. Dattilo made further appearances on December 6 and 11, 2018. In April 2019, it was announced that Dattilo would return to the role; he returned in the June 19, 2019 episode. On December 14, 2020, it was announced Dattilo had signed a deal with the soap to appear in a regular capacity.

== Storylines ==
=== 1993–2001 ===
Lucas comes to Salem with his mother, Kate Roberts (Deborah Adair) after returning from military school. He quickly befriends Sami Brady (Alison Sweeney) and the two start scheming to break up her sister, Carrie Brady (Christie Clark) and her boyfriend Austin Reed (Patrick Muldoon), because Sami wants to be with Austin and Lucas wants to be with Carrie. Lucas tells Sami that losing weight may get Austin's attention, leading to her going on a crash diet. Lucas also convinces Carrie to get plastic surgery to help her get a modeling gig as Bella's Face of the 1990s. Lucas is shocked to learn that he is the illegitimate son of Dr. Bill Horton (Edward Mallory) and that Austin and his sister Billie Reed (Lisa Rinna) are his maternal half-siblings.

When Lucas' friend from school, Alan, comes to town, he rapes Sami and takes Carrie and Sami hostage. Alan is sent to jail, but Sami fears that nobody will ever love her. Lucas feels rejected by Carrie. Lucas and Sami find comfort in each other and have sex. Soon after, Sami drugs Austin and tricks him into also sleeping with her by pretending to be Carrie. Carrie learns that Austin has slept with someone else but doesn't know it was her own sister. Austin and Carrie were apart because they both suspected the other of being unfaithful.

After Lucas' mother Kate is apparently killed in a plane crash, he learns that Vivian is involved and blackmails her into finding Sami and bringing her home in time to stop Austin and Carrie's wedding. Sami returns, claiming she is pregnant with Austin's child. What Lucas doesn't yet realize is that he is baby Will's true father.

Sami's plots continue and eventually bring Carrie and Lucas together, freeing up Austin for Sami. Eventually, Lucas' mom Kate (who survived the crash, and is back in town) learns the truth and exposes both Lucas and Sami. Carrie and Austin are reunited. However, an accident leaves Sami with amnesia, which Lucas uses to his advantage. He pushes Sami towards Austin to keep him away from Carrie. Even as Sami's memories start to return, Lucas convinces her to help him with a new plot to convince Austin that Carrie is falling in love with Mike Horton. Lucas thinks that once Austin gives up on Carrie, he could easily steal her from Mike. Once Austin is free, Sami plans to steal him from Carrie.

The truth eventually comes out, and Austin and Carrie marry. Lucas learns that Sami has been blackmailing his mother, but Kate refuses to tell him what Sami has on her. After Sami gets engaged to Franco Kelly, Lucas refuses to let Franco become Will's stepfather. Kate leans on Franco, but he attacks her. Lucas walks in as Franco is about to smash a poker over Kate's head, and he shoots Franco to save Kate's life. Kate frames Sami with the killing so Lucas can get custody of Will. Sami is almost executed. At the last possible moment Lucas confesses, but the execution is actually stopped because Kate has gotten a dying man to sign a false confession, and Sami is saved.

Lucas later falls in love with Nicole Walker, but she is in love with Eric Brady, Sami's twin brother. Unbeknownst to Lucas, Kate pays Nicole five million dollars in 1999 to marry Lucas so that he can win custody of Will. The plan works, but after Sami is released from prison, she works with Nicole to get Will back. Nicole gets Lucas drunk, seduces him, and makes him think he has beaten her. He confesses to killing Franco. They are divorced less than a year after being married.

After being injured in a fire purposely lit by his mother in the Kiriakis Mansion, Lucas is sent away to a rehab center due to his alcohol addiction.

=== 2002–2010 ===
Lucas comes out of his coma a year later and returns to town, but he is still partially paralyzed. Lucas seems to really want to make amends but shows his true colors at Austin and Sami's wedding when he exposes the truth and ruins the wedding. Eventually, with Victor's help, Lucas gets joint custody of Will. Lucas takes Will for a summer holiday in Africa.

Upon their return, Lucas goes from being strongly on Victor's side to working for his nemesis, Tony DiMera. He enjoys his new power, but the stress drives him back to drinking. His Alcoholics Anonymous sponsor and aunt, Maggie Horton, tells Lucas he will feel compelled to drink until he is truthful about his feelings. Lucas manages to control the drinking, especially after Sami is injured at the DiMera Mansion and nearly dies. While she is in the hospital recovering, Lucas keeps fantasizing about her. He continues to help Sami adjust after she gets out of the hospital.

Lucas, as well as his mother, is one of the main suspects when the Salem Stalker starts a murder spree. When the stalker's identity is revealed to be Sami's mother, Marlena Evans, Lucas comforts Sami. She and Lucas grow closer as he helps her through this difficult time, and they finally make love again. Lucas even proposes to Sami, but with a caveat: she has to promise to redeem herself and never lie to him again.

Sami and Lucas get engaged, but Kate does everything in her power to make sure they never walk down the aisle. She brings Sami's ex, Brandon Walker, back to town. Kate has Sami and Brandon drugged and put into bed with each other, where Lucas finds them together on the morning of the wedding, and he is devastated. As much as he loves Sami, he can't forgive her for this. He rips up the marriage license and swears he never wants anything else to do with her. Sami tries to convince him that Kate is responsible, but his mother smooth-talks him and he only further blames his ex-fiancé.

Lucas joins the team to rescue his half-brother Philip Kiriakis, unaware that Sami (disguised as Stan) has infiltrated the group with a plan of her own. Back in Salem with Philip's rescue successfully accomplished, Lucas and Sami again grow close and get engaged. On their wedding day, Lucas' mother arrives at the chapel dressed in Sami's Stan costume. She exposes Sami's escapades and Lucas dumps Sami at the altar. Austin, arriving for his half-brother's wedding, shows up just in time to comfort Sami.

Later, Lucas accepts a job with his former stepfather, Victor Kiriakis, and travels to California to investigate a possible takeover of High Style. To his surprise, his old flame Carrie Brady has left Mike Horton in India and is the head of the company. Lucas convinces her to return to Salem. In Salem, Carrie and Austin seem to reconnect; but then Carrie admits she has feelings for Lucas, too.

Carrie agrees to marry Lucas, although she loves Austin, because she thinks (due to one of Sami's plots) that she cannot have healthy children with Austin. She also believes that she is pregnant with Lucas' child. She and Lucas move into an apartment across from Austin and Sami, who have seemingly reconciled. Shortly after Carrie's wedding to Lucas, she realizes that she was never pregnant at all. That, along with the sexual tension between the two mismatched couples, results in a quick annulment for Carrie and Lucas.

Meanwhile, Austin and Sami get engaged, but on the wedding day Sami calls off the wedding due to a blackmail note delivered by a mysterious gloved hand.

Sami begins a short relationship with her neighbor EJ Wells, who she later discovers to be a son of Stefano DiMera. Lucas becomes jealous of the relationship, and with the help of their son Will, Lucas and Sami are reunited. While away on a ski trip, snow causes the roof of their cabin to fall on Lucas, and he is knocked unconscious. Sami leaves to find help and flags down a car driving by. In the car is EJ, presumably fleeing after shooting John Black. EJ tells Sami that he will help her save Lucas if she lets him have sex with her. She is disgusted, immediately referring to his proposal as rape, but unwillingly submits to save Lucas' life.

Sami becomes pregnant, and she and Lucas become closer than ever. Lucas proposes to her, and they get engaged again; this time they successfully get married. On their wedding night, Sami confesses everything about EJ and the questionable paternity of the baby. Lucas is distraught, wanting to kill EJ for raping her. He expresses shame over the man he has been – not standing by Sami in the past – and tearfully apologizes, stating it is his fault Sami felt she couldn't come to him after being raped and tormented by EJ. He vows to be a better man for her, the kind she can depend on.

After taking an amniocentesis test, they find out that Sami is having twins. Kate blackmails Nick Fallon to create a fake report saying EJ is the father of the babies. However, Nick actually runs the test, and the results say that Lucas is the father. Sami gives birth to the twins, a boy and a girl. EJ claims that the twins do not look alike even for fraternal twins, and a second DNA test is done. This time the test reveals that the girl, Allie, is the daughter of Lucas, and the boy, Johnny, is EJ's son.

EJ's crime lord father, Stefano DiMera, blackmails Sami to end her marriage with Lucas, and marry EJ instead. EJ is shot at their wedding by a hidden assailant. There are several shots; one hits and nearly kills EJ. Lucas tells Kate that he hired a nurse to watch Johnny and Allie and went to the church and shot EJ. Lucas then confesses to the police, and he is sent to Statesville prison. Mickey Horton arranges for Lucas to finish his sentence with house arrest so he can be at home with his family. He will have to wear an ankle monitor at all times and follow the terms of release precisely. Mickey tells Lucas that Sami has taken the twins and moved into the DiMera mansion with John and Marlena. Lucas goes there and walks in on EJ and Sami having sex. Sami had promised Lucas she would not sleep with EJ, and Lucas can't believe that she has betrayed him. Sami apologizes to Lucas and vows to be true to him, but Lucas can't forgive her. Lucas soon discovers a way to remove his ankle monitor without the alarms sounding. Lucas develops a friendship with Chloe Lane and goes to meet her at the Salem Inn. While in the elevator there, the power goes out, and Lucas and Chloe end up making love.

Lucas is soon discovered and sent back to Statesville prison, but EJ drops the charges and Lucas is once again released. He moves into the Horton cabin and invites his new girlfriend, Chloe, to move in with him.

After Sami witnesses a murder, she goes into witness protection, and Allie moves in with Lucas and Chloe, who later get engaged. However, Chloe calls off the engagement, leaving Lucas deeply upset and returning to alcohol. Eventually Chloe reconsiders and she and Lucas elope. Later, when Kate poisons Chloe and frames Daniel, Lucas learns that Daniel and Chloe had had an affair. Furious about Chloe's betrayal, Lucas files for an annulment before leaving town.

=== 2012–present ===
Lucas returns to Salem in early 2012 at Sami's request and announces that he is engaged to a woman named Autumn. He also reconnects with Will who is now working for EJ. He later loses his job at Hearth and Home when Stefano seeks revenge on Kate for having an affair. In turn, Autumn breaks off the engagement. After his failed engagement, Lucas and Sami are forced to work together when she becomes the CEO of Countess Wilhelmina Cosmetics. During an argument, Sami and Lucas are shocked when Will admits to being gay. Though Lucas initially believes he can deal with it, he has trouble adjusting and discourages Will from dating Sonny Kiriakis (Freddie Smith). Lucas eventually works through his issues and often gives Will advice on his relationship. Lucas is furious when Sami tries to help EJ prove his innocence in Stefano's apparent murder and breaks up with her. Lucas also supports his sister, Jennifer Horton (Melissa Reeves) after the death of her husband, Jack Deveraux (Matthew Ashford) but doesn't approve when she reunites with Daniel.

In January 2015, Lucas begins to bond with Adrienne Kiriakis (Judi Evans). Their friendship eventually blossoms into an affair while Justin (Wally Kurth) is overseas, apparently also engaged in an affair. They continue their relationship until Kate exposes it to Victor Kiriakis (John Aniston). Victor immediately fires Lucas from Titan and evicts Adrienne from the mansion. Adrienne subsequently distances herself from Lucas but resumes their relationship after Justin returns to Salem. Lucas is eventually hired by Chad DiMera (Billy Flynn) to head the rival DiMera Enterprises sub-company "Countess W" as revenge for his mother's meddling. At the end of 2015, Adrienne breaks things off with Lucas to repair her marriage with Justin, although it doesn't work out. Lucas' son Will is murdered by the serial strangler Ben Weston, and Adrienne supports Lucas through his grief, and they become close again. In mid-2016, the couple are engaged. When Chad's marriage to Abigail Deveraux (Kate Mansi) falls apart, Lucas and Adrienne move into the DiMera mansion to assist Chad in raising his newborn son. Adrienne, unknowingly ill with breast cancer, collapses during her wedding ceremony. Lucas, Justin, Kate and Sonny rush her to the hospital, and the wedding is ultimately put off due to her diagnosis. Upon being forced to choose between her ex and her fiancée, the trio decide to put her health and treatment first. After undergoing a double mastectomy, Adrienne chooses Lucas.

When Bonnie Lockhart (a doppelganger of Adrienne) breaks out of prison and switches lives with Adrienne (who is imprisoned, believed to be Bonnie), Bonnie (acting as Adrienne) abruptly "breaks up" with Lucas. He reverts to drinking to quell his loss of both "Adrienne" and Will. The real Adrienne manages to phone Lucas from prison, but because he thinks she dumped him, he gives her short shrift, and she doesn't manage to explain her situation and get his help. Eventually Adrienne's brother Steve realizes who Bonnie is, and her ruse is exposed – in front of Justin – who goes with Steve to get Adrienne out of prison. Adrienne's heart swings back towards Justin. The experience of prison has made her want to restore her relationship with Justin, so Adrienne herself breaks up with Lucas. Lucas nose-dives into alcoholism, and he ignores the appeals of his mom Kate, sister Jennifer, and his Aunt Maggie to get help and enter rehabilitation. Inebriated, he begins having hallucinations of Will. Ben Weston breaks out of incarceration and announces that Will is alive. A police investigation ensues, and Sami returns to town, finding Lucas drunk at Will's grave. Sami and Lucas pursue a lead to Memphis. Lucas is actually the first to see Will alive, but he does not realize it, thinking he is hallucinating. Eventually Sonny and Sami find Will, and despite having lost all memory of his life before being strangled, Will decides to return with them to Salem, where he and Lucas are finally reunited. However, Will's return is no magic bullet for curing Lucas' alcoholism, and he crashes his car whilst driving under the influence and ends up in hospital. Sami both berates and encourages him to take the first step back to health and enter rehab, and with her support, he finally enters rehab and returns to sobriety. On completing rehab and returning to Salem, he and Will build a new father-son friendship, despite Will not remembering him from before. Lucas rekindles his romance with his ex-wife Chloe, including inviting her to a date at the ice rink.

Bonnie shows up with a baby girl and says Lucas is the father, but is soon discover to be Mimi and Rex's daughter Emily leaving Lucas devastated.

Later, he rekindles he relationship with Sami after rescuing her from a kidnapping scheme, that was revealed to be orchestrated by him. When it is revealed, Sami is appalled and leaves Lucas. Rather than runaway from his crime, he turns himself in to the police. While in jail, he deals with Orpheus' schemes and later aids in Harris Michaels' effort to stop Clyde Weston's drug ring. After being beaten by Clyde's goons, Lucas is taken into hiding by Harris and Kate to protect him. He soon aids Harris and Ava Vitali in catching Clyde in Montana after he escapes prison. His help in taking down Clyde leads to him being exonerated for kidnapping Sami. He decides leave and to go send time with Allie and Will in Phoenix, hoping they have forgiven him.

== See also ==
- Lucas Roberts and Sami Brady
