= Stefano DiMera =

- Days of Our Lives character
- Joseph Mascolo as Stefano DiMera
- Portrayed by: Joseph Mascolo (1982–1988, 1993–2016); Frank Fata (1991); Davide Shiavone (2007); Stephen Nichols (2019–2020)
- Duration: 1982–1985; 1988; 1991; 1993–2001; 2006–2016; 2019–2020
- First appearance: January 18, 1982
- Last appearance: April 6, 2020
- Created by: Pat Falken Smith
- Introduced by: Betty Corday; Al Rabin
In-universe information
- Other names: The Phoenix; Rudolpho Meradi; Serge Anatol; Mrs. Lafferty; Joseph M. Wagner
- Occupation: Crime boss businessman
- Family: DiMera
- Father: Santo DiMera
- Mother: Signora DiMera
- Brothers: Six older brothers
- Half-brothers: Ryan Brady
- Wife: Vivian Alamain (1998–1999); Kate Roberts (2009–2012)
- Civil partner: Daphne DiMera (until 1984)
- Sons: André DiMera; Stefan DiMera; Jake Lambert; Benjy Hawk; Dominic Marino; EJ DiMera; Chad DiMera
- Daughters: Renée DuMonde; Megan Hathaway; Lexie Carver
- Adoptive sons: Peter Blake
- Adoptive daughters: Kristen DiMera
- Stepsons: Tony DiMera
- Grandsons: Dimitri Von Leuschner; Theo Carver; Steven Hawk; Johnny DiMera; Thomas DiMera; Trey DiMera (great/adoptive)
- Granddaughters: Sydney DiMera; Grace DiMera; Charlotte DiMera; Rachel Black (adoptive); Olivia DiMera (great)
- Other relatives: Eugene Bradford

Stefano DiMera is a fictional character from the NBC soap opera Days of Our Lives, played by Joseph Mascolo. Created by Pat Falken Smith, Stefano was introduced on January 18, 1982, as the father of Tony DiMera (Thaao Penghlis) looking to expand his criminal empire to Salem. Stefano's early storylines included his feud with Roman Brady (Wayne Northrop), playing his children – Tony and Renée DuMonde (Philece Sampler) against one another when he is presumed dead, orchestrating a series of murders with his son (then his nephew) and Tony's deranged look-a-like André, and replacing the presumed dead Roman with the brainwashed John Black (Drake Hogestyn).

Stefano returns in 1993 for a longer stint. He becomes obsessed with Roman's ex-wife and John's longtime love Marlena Evans (Deidre Hall), and accidentally causes her to be possessed by the devil. Meanwhile, Stefano tries to help his adopted daughter Kristen (Eileen Davidson) steal John from Marlena by fathering a child with her look-a-like Susan Banks (Davidson) and passing it off as John's. Stefano also switches Hope Brady (Kristian Alfonso)'s baby at birth and gives it to his daughter Lexie Carver (Renée Jones) to raise. He leaves town in 2001 when he is exposed.

An ailing Stefano returns in 2006 having sent his son EJ (James Scott) to impregnate Sami Brady (Alison Sweeney) to harvest the baby's stem cells to save his life. Over the next decade, Stefano's past schemes catch up to him as several of his children meet tragic ends. Mascolo retired in 2016 and the character of Stefano is killed off by Hope Brady. From 2019 to 2020, Stephen Nichols played the role after Stefano's essence was transferred into Steve Johnson. During this time, Stefano's obsession with Marlena resurfaces and he also sets out to clone himself. Stefano became one of the most recognizable figures in daytime television and is considered to be one of the greatest villains in television history.

== Casting and development ==
In the early 1980s, then head writer, Pat Falken Smith created the role specifically for Mascolo after seeing his performance as real-life crime boss, Salvatore Maranzano on the NBC miniseries, The Gangster Chronicles in 1981. Mascolo first appeared as Stefano on January 18, 1982. He departed from the series on March 8, 1983, and returned a year later on March 2, 1984, before briefly departing on May 11, 1984, only to return on October 19 of the same year and depart again on February 22, 1985. Mascolo briefly returned to the series from November 4 to December 19, 1988. Actor Frank Fata appeared in the role of Stefano for two episodes which aired on December 3 and 4, 1991. Mascolo reclaimed the role on a contractual basis on September 17, 1993. He departed from the show on December 24, 1996, and re-appeared for a few episodes from February 7 to 13, 1997. Mascolo returned to the show full-time once again on June 13, 1997.

=== Controversial exit ===
In February 2001, a post on Mascolo's official website revealed that contract negotiations were not going well and Mascolo was expected to last appear the coming May. However, a representative of Mascolo's took to the website to deny the reports. In April 2001, rumors of Mascolo's exit due to failed contract negotiations began to surface once again and the producers were apparently considering recasting the role. Days later, Mascolo was spotted at CBS's The Bold and the Beautiful; despite the reports, neither Mascolo, NBC or CBS would comment on the rumors. In May 2001, Mascolo took to his website to confirm the news:

My contract is up in May and I tried to negotiate in good faith... Usually, one expects some give and take but the powers that be are adamant. They now feel that the character of Stefano should take a rest – as if Stefano ever rests.

Though Mascolo seemed disappointed with the show's decision to write the character out briefly, executive producer Ken Corday revealed plans to bring the character back by the fall of 2001 whether Mascolo was available or not. Mascolo made his last official appearance on June 14, 2001. Though Mascolo initially denied the reports, he did indeed debut in the role of Massimo Marone on The Bold and the Beautiful in August 2001.

=== Return to Days and storyline-dictated exit ===
In 2006, following Mascolo's exit from B&B due to lack of storyline, reports began to surface claiming that Mascolo was going to reprise his role as Stefano. The series' producers later confirmed plans to revive the DiMera family to stop a decline in ratings. A deathly ill, comatose Stefano began appearing on December 19, 2006. Though some sources list Mascolo in the cast credits for the episodes, neither Mascolo nor NBC have ever stated that he portrayed comatose Stefano. It was later confirmed that Mascolo would reappear in the role officially in 2007, along with costars Thaao Penghlis (Tony DiMera) and Leann Hunley (Anna DiMera). Mascolo made his first official appearance as Stefano on June 6, 2007. However, the stint proved to be short-lived with Mascolo last appearing on February 29, 2008, and the character of Stefano was written out to allow the writers to come up with more story for him. In May 2008, the tabloid Globe confirmed that Mascolo had been fired and Stefano was written into another coma. This decision did not sit well with Mascolo who gave a heated interview to Soap Opera Digest accusing the executives of "double crossing" him.

=== 2008 Return, brief departure, and final exit ===
In 2008, it was confirmed that Mascolo would once again reprise his role as Stefano in August 2008. Mascolo later revealed in an interview that his initial anger was fueled by emotion following the death of his father. Following his initial ousting, fans took to his website to express how much they missed the character. The fan fervor allowed for Mascolo's return upon a mutual agreement with executive producer, Ken Corday. Mascolo reappeared on August 5, 2008, just before Days went on hiatus for the Summer Olympics. In 2012, after breaking up the character's marriage to Lauren Koslow's Kate Roberts, making him responsible for his own daughter Lexie Carver's (Renée Jones) death and undoing his father/son relationship with James Scott's EJ DiMera, the character appeared to have been written into a corner. With nearly the entire town gunning for Stefano, several sources later confirmed that Stefano was indeed being killed off with Mascolo last appearing alive on June 4, 2012. Mascolo discussed his disapproval in an interview with Soap Opera Digest:

Every single thing that went wrong in Salem was Stefano's fault. Every single thing. He got blamed for everything. When Stefano got blamed for this business with Lexie illness, I got very angry. Stefano and his daughter had an absolutely pure relationship. I adore Renee Jones (Lexie). When she came to my dressing room and said, "I’m going to be leaving soon, and this is what is going to happen," I said, "Oh, no!"

It was very difficult. The bottom line Stefano is will always be about family. So when they wrote that, I couldn't figure it out. In all honesty, Stefano nor EJ would have had wanted it that way. As a matter of fact when James Scott (EJ) saw the business that Elvis wasn't Stefano's son, we both went, "No, that's wrong." We didn't want it that way.

On June 13, 2012, Mascolo departed following the character's funeral. Despite what was happening on-screen, certain sources reported that Mascolo could possibly reprise his role very soon. Following the change in head writers, it was confirmed that Mascolo was indeed on his way back; he made his first appearance on August 21, 2012. Mascolo discussed that the plan was always to have Stefano turn out to be alive, but he didn't agree with how the previous writing regime had scripted the story. With the return of former show runners Gary Tomlin and Christopher Whitesell, Mascolo seemed more "intrigued" with their plans for his character. Mascolo's return also coincides with Eileen Davidson's return as Stefano's daughter Kristen. Mascolo reappeared as Stefano on October 8, 2012.

Due to Mascolo's failing health, he departed the soap, last appearing on January 11, 2016. Mascolo made guest appearances on March 1, March 2, May 20, June 8 and July 7, 2016. Mascolo died on December 8, 2016, in Los Angeles, California at the age of 87 after years of battling Alzheimer's disease.

In early 2017, it was announced that Mascolo had filmed scenes prior to his death. Mascolo last appeared onscreen on February 9, 2017. However, it was later revealed that Mascolo appeared as Shane Donovan, who was posing as Stefano.

With all of Stefano's "deaths" and other departures, viewers and fans were inevitably treated with a scene of Mascolo returning as Stefano (particularly if he'd been gone for a while), proclaiming that it was "good to be back".

== Storylines ==
=== 1980s ===
Stefano first appears on-screen in January 1982 with his son Tony DiMera (Thaao Penghlis), as a vaguely-Mediterranean "businessman" with dubious intentions, surveying the citizens of Salem. Stefano travels to Salem shortly after being introduced as the friend of Lee DuMonde (Brenda Benet) and it is soon revealed he is the father of Lee's daughter, Renée (Philece Sampler), which adds complications to her relationship with Tony. Stefano attempts to help Tony win back his wife, Liz Chandler (Gloria Loring) while Stuart Whyland begins blackmailing him and Stefano kills him. In 1983, Stefano was sent to prison thanks to Detective Roman Brady (Wayne Northrop). Before his death, Stefano's wife, Daphne (Madlyn Rhue), reveals that Tony is not his biological son. Stefano returns in 1984 with his nephew, André (also Penghlis) who has gotten plastic surgery to look like Tony. Together, they plan to frame Roman for a string of murders; meanwhile, Stefano discovers another daughter, Megan Hathaway (Cheryl-Ann Wilson). Her adoptive father, Maxwell, had access to the "Three Prisms" that could cure Stefano's brain tumor. In November 1984, in his quest to obtain one of the prisms, Stefano apparently kills Roman after pushing him off a cliff. In February 1985, Bo Brady's (Peter Reckell) wife Hope (Kristian Alfonso) is framed for Megan's murder and Stefano vows revenge on the entire family. He kidnaps Roman's twins, Sami and Eric, and Roman's widow Dr. Marlena Evans (Deidre Hall) shoots him, apparently killing him.

Stefano resurfaces in 1988 to claim his son Benjy who is about to be adopted by Kayla Brady (Mary Beth Evans) and her husband Steve Johnson (Stephen Nichols), as well as to attempt to "reprogram" Roman, whom he had brainwashed in 1984–85, to serve as one of his assassins (Stefano actually got the idea about brainwashing his "agents" from former daughter-in-law Anna DiMera (Leann Hunley), who had hypnotized her own daughter Carrie into acting out against Roman as part of a plot to discredit him in the eyes of polite society; he further developed this method with the help of his henchmen Dr. Wilhelm Rolf and Ilya Petrov). He traps several of Salem's citizens on his island, but his plans for revenge are foiled, and he escapes. In this iteration, Stefano is presented as more of an international terrorist than a mobster or corrupt businessman.

=== 1990s ===
In December 1991, John Black (Drake Hogestyn) and Roman Brady discover Stefano in a Mayan pyramid in Mexico. The pyramid collapses, and Stefano is once again believed to have perished. Though he survives the collapse, his brain tumor is slowly killing him. Stefano returns to Salem in 1993 and he is taken hostage by Curtis Reed (Nick Benedict) in his weakened state; Curtis's attempt to extort money from Stefano's adopted daughter, Kristen DiMera (Eileen Davidson), is foiled after Stefano kills him. He then convinces Tony and Kristen to marry but the marriage is ruined when Stefano is revealed as the murderer. In an attempt to avoid capture, Stefano speeds away as John shoots out his tires, and Stefano's car explodes. Stefano retreats to his New Orleans estate, Maison Blanche where he kidnaps Marlena and John. After the mansion burns down, Stefano buys a penthouse in Salem, next door to Marlena. Stefano sneaks into her apartment every night and opens her soul, which leads to Marlena becoming possessed by a demon. Under possession, Marlena pushes Stefano out of a window; after the demon is exorcised, a guilt-ridden Marlena helps Stefano recover. In December 1995, Tony fakes his death and frames John. Stefano is later struck by lightning and becomes so obsessed with Marlena that he bribes the judge presiding over John's murder trial to issue the death penalty. In June 1996, Stefano's plans to frame John are soon revealed, which leads to him skipping town. However, at the same time, he also kidnaps Marlena and holds her prisoner in Paris. While in Paris, Stefano is shot at by his former lover Rachel Blake, who instead hits a keg of explosives which ignited and presumably resulted in both of their deaths. Later, his longtime confidante, Celeste Perrault (Tanya Boyd) reveals that he fathered her daughter, Dr. Lexie Carver (Renée Jones) the wife of Salem's police commissioner. Stefano brings Kristen's lookalike, Susan Banks (Davidson) to town, impregnates her and plans to pass the baby off as Kristen's baby, which she actually miscarried; Susan gives birth in February 1997 to Elvis and flees after discovering Stefano's plan. After recovering from a heart attack, Stefano marries Vivian Alamain (Louise Sorel) on December 16, 1998, and plots to kill her to get back all of his belongings left to Vivian by her late husband–who was also Stefano's employee–Steven "Jonesy" Jones (Robert Mandan). In 1999, Stefano brainwashes Hope Brady into thinking she is Princess Gina Von Amberg (Alfonso) and Gina, now in love with John, kidnaps him; feeling betrayed, Stefano exiles her to Paris.

=== 2000s ===
In early 2000, the Bradys rescue Hope from Paris. Hope learns she is pregnant, and Stefano believes he is the father. Stefano convinces Lexie to adopt a child, and then switches Hope's son with another, leaving the child with Lexie and husband Abe Carver (James Reynolds). In 2001, the truth about the baby switch is revealed and Stefano skips town in June 2001.

In 2006, an ill Stefano sends his son Elvis, now known as EJ (James Scott), to impregnate Sami Brady (Alison Sweeney) so they can use the fetus's stem cells to improve Stefano's health. After they steal John's kidney, Stefano proposes that Sami and EJ marry and raise the child together so they can end the feud between the families. In 2008, the origins of the feud are known and it is revealed that Stefano's father Santo DiMera had an affair, and fathered a child with Colleen Brady (Shirley Jones) – Ryan. Ryan was initially believed to be John Black, but it was later revealed that Ryan died in childhood. Stefano had once again erased John's memory in an attempt to turn him to the Pawn again. In 2009, Stefano EJ's then wife Nicole Walker (Arianne Zucker) hid the fact that she switched another baby with Sami's at birth. EJ is furious when he learns the truth, and he kidnaps his daughter, Sydney and fakes her death, leaving everyone devastated, including Stefano. Stefano learns from Anna DiMera that EJ paid her to care for Sydney while everyone believed she was dead; he uses the information to rebuild his relationship with EJ. In September 2009, Stefano blackmails Kate Roberts (Lauren Koslow) into marrying him after helping her get out from under attempted murder charges.

=== 2010s ===
In 2010, Madeline Peterson Woods (Jessica Tuck) returns to Salem and after she dies, it is revealed that her son, Chad (Casey Deidrick), was fathered by Stefano, and Madeline convinced Kate to keep the secret. In 2011, Stefano helps EJ kidnap Sami's husband, Rafe Hernandez (Galen Gering) and imprison him in the DiMera basement while putting a lookalike in his place. In 2012, the DiMera empire begins to crumble when Stefano learns EJ isn't really his son and Lexie is diagnosed with an inoperable brain tumor caused by exposure to toxic gasses when Stefano had André kidnap her. Meanwhile, Kate has an affair with Ian McAllister (Ian Buchanan), a past lover, and Stefano files for divorce, taking everything from her. Stefano also turns John and Hope back into the Pawn and Princess Gina after revealing they are married; he forces them to retrieve a precious coin from Alamainia for him. Several other schemes continue to backfire on Stefano, including his attempt to sabotage EJ's mayoral campaign and him blackmailing Will Horton (Chandler Massey). Having angered many of his enemies, Stefano is shot and presumably killed in early June 2012. Suspicion for the murder quickly falls upon EJ, who continuously professes his innocence, but no one, save for Will or Sami, seems to believe him. After a series of explosions rock Salem in early August 2012, EJ flees with Sami in tow and is subsequently abducted by Ian, who professes that he framed EJ for Stefano's murder. Ian then pulls back a curtain, revealing a very much alive Stefano, who is unconscious, bound in a chair, and wearing a mask. Ian also confesses to falsifying Alice's letter, as well as the blood test that stated EJ wasn't Stefano's son. Stefano suddenly resurfaces in Europe, where he reunites with Kristen and convinces her to come home and bring the family back together. Following the deaths of EJ and Kristen, Stefano forges a strong bond with Chad (Billy Flynn). He encourages him to pursue Abigail Deveraux (Kate Mansi) with a secret agenda to obtain Abigail's inheritance, but Chad foils his plans. In 2015, Stefano suffers a stroke and is left in a wheelchair which leads to André's return and the reveal that they are father and son. Stefano advises André as he takes over running the family's daily operations. In January 2016, a grief-stricken Hope kills Stefano, believing he is responsible for Bo's recent death. Rafe helps Hope cover it up by hiding Stefano's body in an abandoned building and framing André. Stefano's spirit lingers as he appears to Chad, and they say their goodbyes. Stefano last appears to Chad in July 2016 when they were talking about him trusting André. In February 2017, it appears that Stefano has been captured in Prague having supposedly faked his death at the hands of Hope. However, it is later revealed that Steve Johnson and Shane Donovan (Charles Shaughnessy) have orchestrated Stefano's appearance to exonerate Hope of his murder, with Shane posing as Stefano using a bodysuit and makeup. Later, as Steve and Shane reminisce about the success of their plan, they review some pictures the ISA took from afar of Shane pretending to be Stefano. Yet the setting of one of the pictures is a place Shane never recalls posing at. This leads the men to wonder if the man in the photograph could actually be Stefano, leaving the two men wondering fearfully if Stefano is really alive and is out there somewhere.

In 2019, "Stefano" (Stephen Nichols) returned to Salem, with the assistance of "Princess Gina" and Dr. Rolf. Rolf explains that Stefano is, in fact, dead, the victim of Hope Brady's bullet. However, before he died, Rolf transferred Stefano's "essence" — his memories, beliefs, and personality traits — into a computer chip which he has since implanted in Steve Johnson's neck, effectively turning Steve into "the new Stefano" (much as he also did with "Gina's essence" and Hope). Rolf did this to get revenge on the enemies of "the great Stefano" and return Salem to his reign of terror.

== Henchmen ==
Name	Storyline	Missions	Status
Wilhelm Rolf	Various throughout the 1990s–2020s(decade)	Perhaps Stefano's most faithful and longest-lasting henchman, Dr. Rolf usually served as Stefano's right-hand man and personal physician and scientist.	In Prison
Gina Von Amberg	Hope's past/art/Gina and John affair	Copied famous paintings and helped Stefano replace the originals with fakes.	Died of gunshot wound in Salem.
John Black	various	Worked with Princess Gina on Stefano's schemes	Freed of Stefano's influence; owns a private investigation firm and is a respected member of Salem society.
May Chin	Salem Slasher Storyline		
André DiMera		Impersonated Tony; Framed Roman Brady as the Salem Slasher	Killed by Abigail Deveraux in self-defense.
Delia Abernathy	1982–84	Stefano DiMera's maid and henchwoman Helped André DiMera escape to London.	
Silvan Hodak	1983	Attempted to kill Roman Brady at his wedding to Marlena in 1983 (he was a tailor at the tuxedo shop).	
Petrov	Ridgecrest (1983); The Three Prisms (1984–1985)	Helped keep Marlena Evans and Liz Chandler hostage at Ridgecrest. held Gene Bradford, Tony DiMera, and Anna DiMera hostage. Shot Bo Brady. Left Shane Donovan to die with a bomb nearby. Brought the Pawn (John Black) to Salem	Killed in December 1985 by Victor Kiriakis's people.
Alex Marshall	1982–83	Killed Tim Casey, a police officer, in an effort to scare Roman; Plotted to kill Alice Horton.	Sent to prison after burning down the Salem Inn to collect the insurance money in 1987.
Nurse Honeycutt	The Three Prisms (1984–85)	Took care of Sami and Eric Brady when Stefano had them kidnapped. Lied in court about Marlena, seeking revenge, when she was on trial for the death of Stefano in 1985; Kept Daphne DiMera under control.	
Jimmy Porterfield	The Three Prisms (1984–85)	Helped Stefano kidnap Marlena and the twins after befriending Marlena; Lied in court about Marlena, seeking revenge, when she was on trial for the death of Stefano in 1985. Tried to kill Bo Brady.	
Mackenzie	The Three Prisms (1984–85)	Posed as Marlena's bodyguard, while actually infiltrating her house and allowing the twins to be kidnapped.	
Maxwell Hathaway	The Three Prisms (1984–85)		Killed by André DiMera.
Sonia Romanov	The Three Prisms (1984–85)	Helped Stefano find the third prism.	Killed by the Dragon.
Anna DiMera			Currently living in DiMera Mansion.
Drew Donovan (lago)	Stefano's Return/The Island (1988)	Laid false clues for Stefano about Marlena being alive to play with Roman and Diana's minds.	Escaped Salem in early 1989.
Milo	Stefano's Return/The Island (1988)	Captured Roman Brady and Diana Colville on Stefano's island.	Last seen on Stefano's island.
Jeremiah Brown	Stefano's Return/The Island (1988)	Assassin for Stefano who was trained along with Roman Brady (John Black) and Drew Donovan... planned to kill many of those on the island	Was killed by Drew.
Orion Hawk	Stefano's Return/The Island (1988)	Trained Roman Brady/John Black in martial arts years earlier.	Left Salem with Benjy to Europe in 1990.
Domingo Salazar	The Tale of Two Romans (1991)	Guided John and Marlena through San Christabel; Held Roman and John at gunpoint in Mexico.	Was taken to ISA headquarters and later sent to prison.
Curtis Reed (Brown)		Hired by Peter Blake to kill John Black, but failed and blackmailed Kristen Blake for money.	Killed by Stefano.
Celeste Perrault	Maison Blanche (1994)	Held John prisoner at Maison Blanche; Helped keep Hope at Maison Blanche.	Still living in Salem.
Peter Blake	Temporary "Insanity": Peter poisons Laura into insanity (1994)	Arranged to medicate Laura Horton to make her think she was going insane again	Peter is currently serving a sentence of unknown length in an out of state prison to which Stefano had him transferred. He is serving time for kidnapping (Jennifer), attempted murder (Hope, Jasper, Jennifer, Jack, everyone at St. Luke's during Jenn's funeral). Stefano said he would try his best to "reduce" Peter's sentence. It is not known if he is serving time for any of his previous crimes (gaslighting Laura, killing Jude St. Clair, etc.).
Paul	Paris		
Travis Malloy		Kidnapped Jennifer	Died from falling a cliff in fight with Jack Deveraux.
Daryl Kay	Kristen's schemes to keep John and Marlena apart (1996–1997)	Performed laser surgery on Laura Horton to erase her memory about Kristen and her fake pregnancy.	
Carmine	The Brady/DiMera feud	Tried to kill Lucas Roberts.	In prison.
Marco	Various		Paid by Stefano to leave town after he shot Maggie Horton (He was trying to kill Victor Kiriakis but Maggie got in the way).
Impostor Rafe	2011	Real name: Arnold Feniger aka "Javier Morales" Hired by Stefano and EJ to take the place of the already-kidnapped Rafe Hernandez to terrorize Sami into divorce and EJ could get full custody of his kids.	Killed in jail.
Det. Joseph Bernardi (Stefano's dirty cop)	2013	Was ordered by Stefano to get the evidence against Will shooting EJ from the police station and give it to him. Later, he was sent by a jealous Stefano to castrate Rafe's genitals and emasculate Rafe while he was in a coma, which the plot failed as Sami stopped him by shooting him.	Shot by Sami and was killed by Gloria Nash.
Aiden Jennings	2014–15	Ordered by Stefano and Andre to make Hope Brady fall in love with him so she'd forget about Bo, who had been held against his will while on an ISA mission. Stefano and Andre later ordered Aiden to kill Hope after their wedding so that he could pay off his debts and also to clear Chad DiMera's name, who had been falsely arrested on 3 murder charges.	Shot and killed in a fight with Bo Brady

== Fake death timeline ==
The following list is a timeline of Stefano's fake "deaths"; he either faked them himself, was presumed dead, or was reported dead by others.

- A stroke in 1983. It was later revealed a fake heart attack, and dates is mentioned as March 8.
- In 1984, his car plunged into the icy waters of Salem's harbor during a police chase.
- In 1985, Marlena shot him, and he fell from a catwalk as the building caught fire. (he also had a brain tumor)
- In 1991, he was presumed to have died in another fire and cave collapse.
- In 1994, his car erupted into a fireball after being shot at by John.
- Also in 1994, he drowned near Maison Blanche.
- In 1996, he died in a plane explosion.
- Also in 1996, he was blown up and buried under collapsing tunnel during a confrontation with Rachel Blake. This was his last depicted "death" until 2007.
- In 2002, André DiMera (posing as Tony) claimed that his uncle had died from injuries sustained from a car crash in Monte Carlo.
- In 2004, when Marlena and the presumed-dead Salem Stalker victims found a blackened, unrecognizable corpse on Melaswen, André (posing as Tony) claimed it was Stefano. André said he had killed Stefano by draining his blood so André could cure his own blood disease.
- In 2007, his death was faked once again. As a setup by the Salem P.D., Steven "Patch" Johnson appeared to stab Stefano to death, but he was drugged and a fake funeral was set up to lure André.
- In 2012, Stefano DiMera was shot dead from behind after several characters confronted him about his crimes. On August 16, Ian McAllister claimed to have killed Stefano and on August 20, Ian admitted to EJ that he killed Stefano and planned to frame EJ for the murder. On August 21, it was revealed that Stefano was not killed. Ian used an impostor that looked like him named Paolo. He faked the letter that said EJ was not Stefano's son and faked their blood types in the hospital.
- In 2016, Stefano was shot three times by Hope because of his alleged involvement in Bo's death. This is the last time Stefano was (physically) alive, but the story ends on an ambiguous note as to whether or not Stefano is still alive.
- In 2020 (Time Jump 2021), Stefano's consciousness which had previously been implanted into Steve Johnson through a microchip, was removed. The microchip was destroyed by Tony and Chad. Stefano had been physically dead since 2016, and this marked the death of his consciousness.

== Notable possessions ==
- Phoenix Ring: Stefano's most iconic possession. A gold ring with a black flat square on top. It is embroidered with a Phoenix, and said to be the reason why Stefano keeps coming back to life. During the 2009 DiMera-Kiriakis war, Stefano's son EJ wore the ring while Stefano was held captive. It can apparently bring Andre back to life as well, since he is the son of the Phoenix. This was briefly contradicted in 2007 when Andre was revealed to be posing as Tony (who was assumed to be Stefano's son), and therefore was Stefano's nephew, This was corrected in 2015 when Andre was revealed to be Stefano's son. After Stefano's final death in 2016 his son Andre wore the ring until his death in 2018, Stefano's youngest son Chad currently wears the ring.
- Portrait: Stefano's portrait has been hanging on the wall of the foyer of the DiMera mansion since 2007. The portrait is iconic and synonymous with Stefano's ownership of the mansion. Whenever he has lost possession of the mansion, the portrait is usually taken down. A safe is known to be hidden behind the portrait that contains valuable items to the DiMeras. Since Stefano's death in 2016, the portrait remained on the wall and various characters talk to the portrait as if it were Stefano himself.
- The key "to ending the feud": A gold key that Stefano kept around his neck. It was said to contain the secret to ending the Brady-DiMera feud.
- Chess set: Stefano had a passion for playing chess, and kept a chessboard. Whenever Stefano felt he had the upper hand, he would mirror his moves with chess pieces. Stefano would often refer to the people he would use as "pawns", and for the longest time the "Queen" symbolized Marlena Evans, but Stefano would also use the "Queen" to symbolize any women that were important to his enemies. Stefano taught his sons Andre, EJ, and Chad and his grandson Theo to play chess and enjoyed playing chess with them. In 2016, when Hope shot Stefano, his hand symbolically knocked over all of the chess pieces as he fell back into his wheelchair.

== Reception ==
In 2020, Charlie Mason from Soaps She Knows placed Stefano #6 on the list of the 35 most memorable characters from Days of Our Lives, commenting that "Over and over again, the Phoenix rose. So it's a bitter pill to swallow that, owing to the passing of his portrayer, Joseph Mascolo, he won't cheat death yet again to wreak havoc on Salem". Mason and Candace Young also referred to Stefano as "the biggest Big Bad soapdom's ever known." In 2024, Mason also placed Stefano seventh on his ranked list of Soaps' 40 Most Iconic Characters of All Time, writing, "The late, great Joseph Mascolo created such a larger-than-life villain that if it weren't for the actor's death, we'd be looking forward to the Phoenix rising yet again".

== See also ==
- List of soap opera villains
