= Deborah Adair =

American television actress

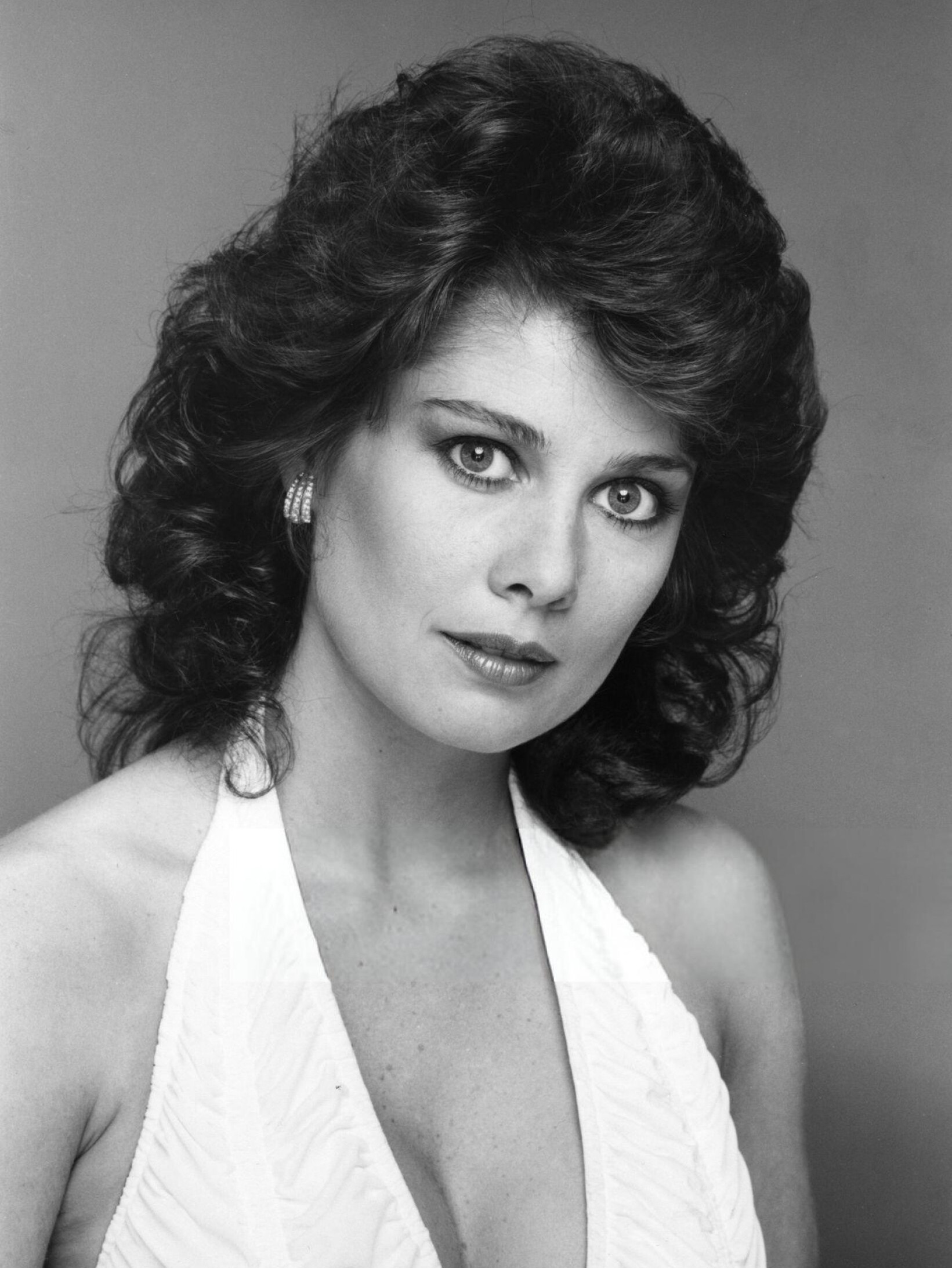
- Adair, c. 1983
- Born: Deborah Adair Miller; 1952 or 1953 (age 73–74); Lynchburg, Virginia, U.S.
- Education: University of Washington
- Occupation: Actress
- Years active: 1980–1995

Deborah Adair (born Deborah Adair Miller; 1952 or 1953)is an American television actress, primarily known for her roles in soap operas.

== Early years ==
Adair was born Deborah Adair Miller in Lynchburg, Virginia. During her youth she lived in Virginia, California, New York, Tennessee, Minnesota, and finally Washington state. She is the daughter of Mr. and Mrs. G. Russell Miller, and she has a brother and a sister. She graduated from the University of Washington with a bachelor's degree in advertising and marketing. She had to change her name when she joined the actors' union because the union already had a Deborah Miller.

Miller won the Miss Bellevue title in 1972 and was second runner-up in the 1972 Miss Washington contest.

== Career ==
Adair was assistant promotion director at KIRO-TV in Seattle from 1976 to 1978. Personal reasons caused her to leave Seattle, and she worked as a flight attendant for Pan Am from April 1978 to January 1979, when she became a waitress. She eventually decided to act on a long-time desire to be an actress.

Adair went to Hollywood and found an agent who helped her land small parts in several television series, with her debut coming in an episode of Paris. Her big break came in 1980 when she was cast as Jill Foster Abbott on the daytime soap opera The Young and the Restless. In 1983, she left The Young and the Restless to take the role of Tracy Kendall in the primetime soap opera Dynasty, a role she played until 1984. She followed this with the regular role of Daisy Lloyd in another Aaron Spelling series, Finder of Lost Loves, in 1984. In 1986, she made a one-week return to The Young and the Restless to reprise her role as Jill. She also appeared on the daytime soap opera Santa Barbara for a few episodes.

Adair married television producer Chip Hayes in 1987. She worked with her husband on the primetime soap opera Melrose Place, in which she played the recurring role of advertising executive Lucy Cabot from 1992 to 1993. She also portrayed the role of Kate Roberts on Days of Our Lives in 1993 and became one of few actors to concurrently play in a daytime soap opera and a nighttime soap opera. She left Melrose Place while continuing on Days of our Lives, a role for which she won the Best Supporting Actress Award at the Soap Opera Digest Award in 1994.

In total, Adair has appeared in seven projects produced by Aaron Spelling; Dynasty, Matt Houston, The Love Boat, Finder of Lost Loves, Hotel (in which she played four roles between 1984 and 1987), Melrose Place and the television movie Rich Men, Single Women (1990). She has also appeared in a variety of other primetime series such as Murder, She Wrote, Blacke's Magic and MacGyver. Adair also played a supporting role as Kate Chase in the Emmy Award-nominated miniseries Lincoln (1988).

== Personal life ==
Adair married Gary Leigh Baker on July 13, 1974, in Bellevue, Washington.
