= Alexis Thorpe =

American actress

- Born: Alexis Ann Thorpe; April 19, 1980 (age 46); Newport Beach, California, U.S.
- Occupation: Actress
- Years active: 2000–2016
- Spouse: Corey Pearson (m. 2009; div. 2014)
- Children: 2

Alexis Ann Thorpe (born April 19, 1980) is an American actress. She is best known for playing Rianna Miner on the soap opera The Young and the Restless, from 2000 to 2002, and Cassie Brady on the soap opera Days of Our Lives from 2002 to 2005.

== Career ==
Thorpe's first professional role was at the Canyon Lake Theatre as Wendy in Peter Pan. Thorpe performed at the Pacific Light Opera and local community theaters in Orange County.

Thorpe was first discovered in a workshop production of Assassins, leading to a role in the 2000 film The Adventures of Rocky and Bullwinkle. That same year, Thorpe joined the cast of the daily soap opera The Young and the Restless, playing Rianna Miner. Thorpe moved from there to the soap opera Days of Our Lives, in July 2002. She left that series in November 2003, when her character was believed to have been murdered by the Salem Stalker. She returned, her character having avoided death, in guest appearances on the show in 2004 and 2005.

Thorpe also appeared in the television series Forsaken and Pretty Cool. In 2003, she made a cameo appearance as herself on an episode of Friends, and appeared as Jennifer in American Wedding. In 2004, she appeared in the third episode of House as the patient's fiancée.

Thorpe stepped back from screen acting after two appearances in 2007, as Linda Murphy in the independent film The Man from Earth and as Kyla Bradley in Nightmare City 2035. She returned briefly in 2016, making an appearance in the independent film The Unlikely's.

== Personal life ==
Thorpe grew up in Yorba Linda, California. She is the oldest of four children, having two sisters and a brother.

Thorpe married actor Corey Pearson in 2009; the couple had two children before they divorced in 2014.

== Filmography ==
=== Film ===
Year	Title	Role	Notes
2000	The Adventures of Rocky & Bullwinkle	Supermodel	Feature film debut
2001	The Forsaken	Teddy	
2002	Pretty Cool	Tiffany Granger	
2003	American Wedding	Jennifer	
2006	National Lampoon's Pledge This!	Morgan	
2007	The Man from Earth	Linda	
2007	Nightmare City 2035	Kyla Bradley	
2016	The Unlikely's	Jennifer	Final film role

=== Television ===
Year	Title	Role	Notes
2000	Emmanuelle 2000	Tiffany	Episode: "Emmanuelle Pie"
2000–2002	The Young and the Restless	Rianna Miner	Recurring role; 12 episodes
2002–2005	Days of Our Lives	Cassie Brady	Recurring role; 195 episodes
2003	Friends	Herself	Episode: "The One with the Soap Opera Party" Uncredited
2004	House	Mindy	Episode: "Occam's Razor"
2005	Nip/Tuck	Amber	Episode: "Derek, Alex, and Gary"
