= Nick Benedict =

American actor (1946–2023)

- Benedict as Curtis Reed in a publicity photo
- Born: Nicholas Joseph Sciurba; July 14, 1946; Los Angeles, California, U.S.
- Died: July 14, 2023 (aged 77); Tehachapi, California, U.S.
- Occupations: Actor; musician
- Years active: 1955–2001
- Spouses: Michelle Dow (m. 1976; ann. 1976) Ginger Loli-Benedict (m. 2001)
- Father: Richard Benedict

Nick Benedict (born Nicholas Joseph Sciurba; July 14, 1946 – July 14, 2023) was an American actor and musician. He was perhaps best known for his roles on daytime soap operas and television films. Benedict was notable for portraying Curtis Reed in Days of Our Lives between 1993 and 2001. He was also nominated for a Daytime Emmy Award for his role as Philip Brent on the ABC soap opera All My Children.

== Early life ==
Benedict was born in Los Angeles, California, in 1946. His father was actor and director Richard Benedict. He served in the U.S. Navy during the Vietnam War prior to his acting career.

== Career ==
Benedict made his debut in 1955 in the series Wiretapper as a child, appearing alongside his father Richard Benedict. His first performance as an adult was in Mike and the Mermaid at the age of 17. He would later have minor television roles in Ironside and Hawaii Five-O during the late 1960s.

In 1969 he appeared in the Mission Impossible TV series episode, The Vault. He had his first significant role as star-crossed Vietnam veteran Philip Brent on the ABC soap opera All My Children, he would play the role from 1973 to 1978. Benedict had replaced Richard Hatch in the role. For this role, he was nominated for a Daytime Emmy Award during his last year on the show. He also appeared in Medical Center and Knots Landing.

From 1980 to 1981 he played Michael Scott on The Young and the Restless. From 1982 to 1983, he played Ron Washington on Another Life. He appeared on The Dukes of Hazzard, as Frank James, in the seventh-season episode, "Go West, Young Dukes". He played the attorney Michael Fox in the 1985 Tales from the Darkside episode "Madness Room". He also appeared in seven episodes of Santa Barbara.

In the late 1980s, Benedict revealed in a 1993 interview that he took a short break from acting following the death of his father Richard Benedict. During his acting hiatus, he oversaw a contracting business and performed at nightclubs with musical groups.

In 1990 he starred alongside Nancy Allen in the television film Memories of a Murder. That same year, Benedict appeared in thirty episodes of Tribes. In 1991, he had a small role in the short sports film The Pistol: The Birth of a Legend. He played the role of Curtis Reed in Days of Our Lives on-and-off between 1993 and 2001, appearing in ninety-three episodes. In the 1990s, he mainly appeared in films aside from his ongoing role in Days of our Lives. He also played Eddie in the 1996 film Angela Mooney Dies Again alongside Mia Farrow and Brendan Gleeson.

Benedict made his last screen appearance with a minor role in George Santo Pietro's Kept in 2001.

== Personal life ==
Benedict married Michelle Dow in 1976, however the marriage was annulled within the year. He was married to Ginger Loli-Benedict from 2001 until his death. The couple lived in Bear Valley Springs, California. Loli-Benedict worked as a bartender in Tehachapi, California. Aside from acting, Benedict was also a painter and musician.

Benedict was hospitalized on July 2, 2023, for an emergency spinal cord surgery in Arizona. Two days later, he was moved to hospice care after being paralyzed from the neck down. He died of complications from the surgery on July 14, 2023, his 77th birthday, in Tehachapi, California.

== Selected works ==
- Wiretapper (1955)
- Mission Impossible (1969)
- Little Cigars (1973)
- Slaughter's Big Rip-Off (1973)
- All My Children (1973–1978)
- The Young and the Restless (1980–1981)
- Another Life (1982–1983)
- Tales from the Darkside (1985)
- Rachel River (1987)
- An American Summer (1990)
- Memories of a Murder (1990)
- The Pistol: The Birth of a Legend (1991)
- Days of Our Lives (1993–2001)
- Angela Mooney Dies Again (1996)
- Kept (2001)
