= Austin Reed (Days of Our Lives) =

Fictional character from the soap opera Days of Our Lives

- Days of Our Lives character
- Austin Peck as Austin Reed
- Portrayed by: Patrick Muldoon (1992–1995, 2011–2012); Austin Peck (1995–2006, 2017–2021)
- Duration: 1992–2002; 2005–2006; 2011–2012; 2017; 2019; 2021
- First appearance: July 7, 1992
- Last appearance: September 10, 2021
- Created by: Sheri Anderson
- Introduced by: Ken Corday and Tom Langan (1992); Ken Corday and Stephen Wyman (2005); Ken Corday, Noel Maxam and Greg Meng (2011)
- Spin-off appearances: Days of Our Lives: Night Sins (1993); Chad and Abby in Paris (2019); Days of Our Lives: Beyond Salem (2021)
- Patrick Muldoon as Austin Reed
In-universe information
- Occupation: Forensic accountant; Accounting professor; Business Executive; Boxer; Pianist
- Family: Roberts
- Parents: Curtis Reed; Kate Roberts
- Stepfather: Victor Kiriakis (1993–1994); Roman Brady (2003–2005) (2022-present); Stefano DiMera (2009–2012); André DiMera (2017–2018)
- Siblings: Billie Reed; Lucas Horton; Rex Brady; Cassie Brady; Philip Kiriakis
- Spouse: Sami Brady (1996–1997); Carrie Brady (1997–1999, 2006–present)
- Sons: Noah Reed
- Nieces and nephews: Chelsea Brady; Will Horton; Allie Horton; Tyler Kiriakis; Emily Lockhart

Austin Reed is a fictional character from the soap opera Days of Our Lives. The role was played by actor Patrick Muldoon from 1992 to 1995, and again from 2011 to 2012. The character was played for a longer duration by actor Austin Peck, from April 13, 1995, to 2002, from 2005 to 2006, and again in 2017 and 2019. According to his storyline on the series, Austin Reed's birth name is unknown. His father, Curtis, took the children (Austin and his sister Billie) and changed their names to prevent their mother Kate Roberts from finding them. All that is known is that his original surname was Brown.

Muldoon's return in 2011 was short-lived. In April 2012, it was announced that Muldoon, along with Clark and several other actors, had been let go from the series. Muldoon tweeted: "#DAYS been great 2 us. It will always be home. We all feel sick". On September 15, 2016, it was announced that Peck would reprise his portrayal as Austin, alongside Christie Clark's Carrie. The couple returned on January 11, 2017 as Carrie (a lawyer) came to assist her mother Anna. After accomplishing this, Peck and Clark departed on February 16, 2017. Peck later reprised the role in two spinoffs in 2019 and 2021.

== Character's background ==
In July 1992 an aspiring boxer named Austin Reed came to Salem, and his troubled sister Billie Reed followed weeks later. He was instantly smitten with Carrie Brady. Carrie gave Billie a place to stay, which led to the two of them spending a lot of time together. Carrie and Austin were doing great until Sami came to town in January 1993 and Austin didn't throw a fight, which drew the ire of a lot of bad people. Due to this, acid was thrown on Carrie's face, scarring her. Carrie went through reconstructive surgery, while Austin dealt with the murder of his father, Curtis. Billie was the prime suspect. At the trial, both Billie and Austin learned that Kate Roberts was their biological mother – making Lucas Roberts their half-brother. Meanwhile, Carrie's half-sister Sami Brady was obsessed with Austin and plotting any way she could to get him.

After Alan and Sami's relationship came to an end, and Carrie and Austin broke up, Sami went so far as to drug and rape Austin, making him believe she was Carrie in January 1995. The following morning, Austin was horrified to awaken and find Sami in his bed. Austin rejected Sami and she fled Salem. Carrie and Austin attempted to find Sami, traveling to Los Angeles, where they reunited. Carrie and Austin managed to survive all the drama and returned to Salem. Austin soon proposed and Carrie and Austin planned their wedding. Sami ruined their happiness by announcing that she was pregnant with Austin's child, who was later named Will, in July 1995. Austin decided the right thing would be to stay with Sami and try to make a go of it, even though his heart would always be with Carrie. In June 1996, Kate and Jamie Caldwell (Sami's BFF) exposed that Sami drugged Austin and he and Carrie reunited.

In August 1996, Will was abducted by a neighbor of Sami's and whisked off to France. Sami was able to get Austin to marry her in order to bring Will home in September 1996. The marriage was annulled shortly afterwards. In December 1996, Sami was in a dangerous car accident on News Year's Eve. Austin blamed himself as he had told Sami he hated her shortly beforehand. The accident rendered Sami with no memory of the previous 3 years. As Austin took care of Sami, he decided it would be best for her and Will if they would remarry. Over the course of time, Sami regained her memory as well as learned—due to seeing medical records—that Wil wasn't Austin's son, but really Lucas'. The wedding was set to take place in September 1997. However, the wedding ceremony was interrupted by Carrie, who exposed the truths that Lucas was Will's actual father and that Sami had been faking amnesia. Austin, heartbroken, left Sami at the altar and married Carrie that same day. Sami left Salem for a while, but unfortunately Carrie and Austin's married bliss didn't last long. Sami returned months later, fought for custody of Will, and fell in love and became engaged to Franco Kelly. In September 1998, Franco was murdered by Lucas Roberts, and wanting revenge on Sami, Kate covered up the murder and made it look like Sami committed the murder. Austin fled town with Sami to help her, but Sami was caught, tried and set to be executed for the murder. At the last moment, the truth came out. Because Austin had spent so much time with Sami in a misguided attempt to help her, Carrie felt their relationship was falling apart. Mike Horton stepped in to fill the void as he was attracted to Carrie, and eventually Carrie and Austin broke up. Carrie moved to Israel with Mike on November 19, 1999. Austin then rekindles his romance with Sami later that same year, and despite a brief fling with Greta and Nicole, Austin and Sami remain on and off before becoming engaged in the spring of 2002. However, Sami blackmails Victor into transferring Austin's job to Hawaii to escape Lucas and when Austin finds out, he leaves Sami at the altar and leaves Salem.

In 2005, Austin returned to Salem for his half-brother Lucas and Sami's next attempt at tying the knot. The wedding didn't happen and Austin was there for Sami when no one else was. With no place to stay in Salem, Austin moved in with Sami. They formed a company along with Nicole called Austin Reed and Company, or ARC. The company took over High Style, a company that was run by Carrie. Austin did not know Carrie was back in the United States and did not know High Style was her company. Lucas found out the company Austin was taking over was indeed Carrie's but did not tell Austin. Lucas knew that once Carrie and Austin saw each other, they would get back together. Lucas had fallen for Carrie and wanted her to himself for several years, and knew Carrie would not get back with Austin if Austin took over her company, so he allowed it to happen. Carrie was furious with Austin for taking over her company, and Lucas stepped in to comfort her; they began a relationship. Sami and Lucas deviously worked together to help Lucas further his relationship with Carrie. Sami's motive was to make sure Carrie was not available romantically for Austin, as Sami wanted Austin for herself. Eventually Carrie and Lucas married, and Austin and Sami were a couple and were planning yet another wedding.

To ensure that Carrie would no longer want to be with Austin, Sami was also able to blackmail Dr. Lexie Carver after finding out about Lexie's affair with young detective Tek Kramer. Lexie thought up of a bogus story to tell Carrie, which was that Austin and Carrie shared rare genetic markers and if they ever had children, the child would suffer extreme birth defects that could result in death.

Carrie then moved on romantically with Lucas, and even became engaged. She soon believed she was pregnant due to an inaccurate pregnancy test, causing her and Lucas to rush their wedding date. When Carrie found out there was no baby, and had a "hysterical pregnancy", she was distraught and cheated on Lucas with Austin (who was still engaged to Sami) on the roof of their apartment building.

Carrie was extremely relieved when Austin did not marry Sami. Prior to the ceremony she had expressed to Marlena that she was still in love with Austin, and admitted to loving Lucas but not being in love with him. After secretly meeting with Austin to make love and comfort one another, Lucas and Sami came to the roof and caught them. After a bitter tirade on Sami and Lucas' part, Carrie was kicked out of their apartment. Soon after, Carrie handed Lucas annulment papers and Lucas was more than willing to sign them in order to immediately get Carrie out of his life. However, minutes later, the Gloved Hand slid a note under Sami's apartment door and Lucas, Carrie and Austin discovered the truth behind Sami's blackmailing of Lexie. After Sami finally admitted the truth about her misdeeds, a furious Carrie attacked her. The two sisters fought and Carrie swore she would make public what Sami had done to Lexie.

Later, Carrie ran into Lexie and revealed to her that she knew the truth behind Sami's blackmail. Although Lexie tried to plea her case, Carrie didn't care and promised to get even with Lexie by reporting her to the hospital board and the AMA. After showing up with Dr. Finch to keep her promise, Lexie was immediately fired and Carrie felt that her stay in Salem was nearly complete. During dinner, Austin suggested that they move to Switzerland, where he can work at the Mythic Communications division there and Carrie can reclaim Highstyle. Carrie agreed on one condition—that they get married first. The two immediately went to the Justice of the Peace with their signed marriage licenses and got married (but not before being briefly interrupted by a drunk Sami and Carrie disowning her). After saying their goodbyes to John, Kate, Marlena and Roman, Austin and Carrie took a plane and left Salem.

In June 2010, Carrie also briefly returned to town and told Sami that she and Austin were happy and trying to start a family.

On September 26, 2011, Austin and Carrie returned to Salem. It was revealed that Austin had become a forensic accountant after Mythic Communications had been forced to close down.

In October 2015, Austin couldn't attend his nephew Will's funeral.
