= Bryan Dattilo =

American actor

- Born: Bryan Ronald Dattilo; July 29, 1971 (age 55); Kankakee, Illinois, U.S.
- Education: Beverly Hills High School; Santa Monica College
- Occupation: Actor
- Years active: 1986–present
- Spouses: Jessica Denay (m. 1999–2001) Elizabeth Cameron (m. 2011)
- Children: Gabriel Dattilo (son, b. 1999); Delilah Dattilo (daughter, b. 2014)
- Relatives: Kristin Dattilo (sister)

Bryan Dattilo (born July 29, 1971) is an American actor. He is best known for his role as Lucas Horton on the NBC daytime soap opera Days of Our Lives.

== Personal life ==
Dattilo was born in Kankakee, Illinois, in 1971. He later moved with his family to West Palm Beach, Florida, after his parents' divorce, where his mother became one of the first female editors for The National Enquirer. His family later moved to Los Angeles, California, and at the age of nine, Dattilo was enrolled in acting lessons along with his sister, Kristin. He later landed his first television acting job in a role on HBO's Not Necessarily The News.

Dattilo has one brother, Brent; one sister, Kristin; and three half-sisters, Tiffany, Anna, and Tess. His family is of Italian descent.

In 1989, Dattilo graduated from Beverly Hills High School. He attended Santa Monica College and majored in psychology. Dattilo has two children. On July 12, 2011, Dattilo married Elizabeth Cameron in Palos Verdes, California. They have a daughter named Delilah.

== Career ==
Dattilo has played the role of Lucas Horton on and off since 1993 on the daytime soap opera Days of Our Lives. He has also had guest appearances on the television series Saved by the Bell, CSI: NY, California Dreams, Doogie Howser, M.D., In the Heat of the Night, and Charles In Charge.

Dattilo has a podcast, Conspiracies Inc., launched in March 2022. With a knowledge of the paranormal, Dattilo interviews guests in the UFO/alien universe and delves into what he has stated was his own alleged abduction by aliens in 1993.
