= Will Horton and Sonny Kiriakis =

Will and Sonny
- Days of Our Lives character
- Chandler Massey as Will Horton and Freddie Smith as Sonny Kiriakis
- Duration: 2011–2015; 2017–2023
- Created by: Gary Tomlin and Christopher Whitesell (Note: While seeds for the couple's story were planted during Marlene Clark Poulter and Darrell Ray Thomas Jr.'s tenure, Will and Sonny's actual romance doesn't start until the fall of 2012 during Tomlin and Whitesell's tenure.)
- Introduced by: Ken Corday, Lisa de Cazotte and Greg Meng
- Guy Wilson and Freddie Smith as Will and Sonny
In-universe information
- Other names: WilSon
- Family: Horton, Brady, Roberts, Kiriakis, Johnson
- Spouse: 2014–present
- Children: Arianna Horton (Will's daughter, via Gabi)

Will Horton and Sonny Kiriakis are fictional characters from the American daytime drama Days of Our Lives. They are notable for the first male-male wedding in US daytime drama history, and for being Days of Our Lives first same-sex supercouple. The couple was originally portrayed by Chandler Massey as Will and Freddie Smith as Sonny, who brought acclaimed popularity to the pairing.

Guy Wilson took over playing Will from January 2014 to October 2015 – with his tenure including the characters' engagement and wedding, and Will's death – and then Massey returned to the role in September 2017, when Will was found to be alive, after fan outrage of Will's death led to the show reversing the decision. Massey played Will again as a show regular for three years through to September 2020, when Will and Sonny exited the show together.

In September 2021, Will and Sonny featured in the spin-off show Days of Our Lives: Beyond Salem, a one week limited series, in which the role of Sonny was recast with actor Zach Tinker, with Massey again as Will. Both actors re-appeared as the couple in the subsequent spin-off Days of Our Lives: A Very Salem Christmas in December 2021; and then Will and Sonny returned to the main show in March 2022, with Tinker debuting as Sonny on the parent show, and Massey appearing in a recurring capacity as Will. The pairing exited again in February 2023.

On internet message boards and in the soap media, the couple is sometimes referred to by the portmanteau "WilSon" (for Will and Sonny). Will is the son of Lucas and Sami and Sonny is the son of Justin and Adrienne.

== Casting and development ==
In 2010, Chandler Massey took over the role of legacy Days of Our Lives character Will Horton, and in June 2011 it was announced that actor Freddie Smith was joining the show as a gay character, and that the show was embarking on its first ever gay romance. By the Fall of 2011 rumors were going around that Will was gay and he was going to be in a relationship with Freddie Smith's character, Sonny Kiriakis. At the end of 2011, it was confirmed that Will was going to be gay.

Will and Sonny were soon confirmed to going to be in a relationship. Chandler Massey said, "Will admires Sonny for being comfortable in who he is and seem like he has it all together." Will and Sonny were soon put in a relationship and critics and audience liked it. Many critics have admired it for treating this couple like any other heterosexual couple.

Chandler Massey commented on the relationship of Will and Sonny and said, "As far as Sonny and Will go, I get the power couple thing between them and they have the healthiest relationship on the show, believe it or not. But life throws all these things at them and basically the only way Will can get through it is by leaning on Sonny so they'll be staying together and only grow deeper in love."

In August 2013, Days of Our Lives announced that Massey had left the show in order to pursue his education, and Days had found the "right recast" for Will This was revealed the following month to be Guy Wilson. Massey's last episode aired January 2, 2014 and Wilson's first episode aired January 8. Wilson played Will until the character was murdered, with his last appearance being October 13, 2015. Despite Days executive producer Ken Corday saying that characters who die "are dead", it was announced in May 2017 that Chandler Massey was returning to the role of Will. Massey's new episodes commenced September 15, 2017.

== Storylines ==
=== 2011–13 ===
In June 2011, on the day of his high-school graduation, Will meets the openly gay Sonny through their mutual cousin, Abigail Deveraux. They become friends, and they form a business partnership with their friend Chad DiMera. Frustrated by Will's lack of intimacy, Will's girlfriend Gabi Hernandez breaks up with him, and he has an emotional breakdown. Will goes out with Sonny and his gay friends, and he ends up kissing one of Sonny's gay friends - Neil Hultgren; Sonny sees this, and he advises Will to talk to someone, and Will ultimately comes out as gay to his grandmother, Marlena. He comes out to the rest of his family, who are mostly supportive; Will is outed by the local media thanks to him being a suspect in the shooting of Stefano DiMera, because his alibi is a date with Neil at a gay bar. While working with Will in an effort to prove that Will's boss EJ DiMera is being framed for the shooting, Sonny admits to Will's dad Lucas that he has feelings for Will. In the aftermath of a series of explosions, Sonny frantically searches for Will and, finding him uninjured, kisses him; Will rejects Sonny and they argue, but Will soon realizes he does have feelings for Sonny. However, when Will sees Sonny's friend Brian flirt with him, he believes he has missed his chance.

Will's high-school friend Tad "T" Stevens, who had been hostile to Sonny because of his sexual orientation, returns to town and finds out Will has been outed as gay. T is horrible to Will about his sexuality, and blames Sonny for "turning" Will gay. Feeling rejected by his friend T, Will turns to Gabi, and they end up having sex. Straightaway Will and Gabi agree it was a mistake, and Will tells Gabi he is gay. T eventually has a change of heart and is instrumental in helping Will and Sonny acknowledge their feelings for each other, and they agree to start dating. Early in their relationship, Will and Sonny struggle with their families; Sonny's mom Adrienne doesn't think Will is good enough for Sonny, while Will's dad Lucas is suspicious of Sonny's intentions with Will, thinking Will could be hurt by him. Will feels insecure because Sonny has had past relationships while he hasn't; they overcome this issue and make love for the first time on November 14, 2012.

Gabi tells Will that she is pregnant with his child. He supports her initial plan to have an abortion and he takes her to a clinic. Whilst waiting at the clinic for Gabi to have the procedure Will realizes that he really wants the baby, and asks to be allowed to see Gabi, but isn't allowed to. Happily, Gabi too, at the last minute, realizes she wants the child and decides not to have the procedure. Gabi is dating Will's cousin Nick Fallon. Nick is keen to start a family, and when he learns of the baby and its paternity, he offers to marry Gabi and claim to be the baby's father, to which Gabi and Will agree. Chad confides in Sonny that Gabi had a role in Melanie Jonas's kidnapping, leading to tension between Sonny and Gabi. At Nick and Gabi's wedding, Chad reveals that Nick is not the baby's father; Will then confesses that he is (a fact unknown to Chad), and Sonny breaks up with him over the deception. Brian continues to pursue Sonny, but ultimately Sonny and Will reconcile after Will receives a Valentine's Day gift Sonny had arranged before the breakup, leading to a heartfelt talk.

Nick discovers an incriminating secret about Will – that Will had shot and nearly killed EJ years earlier when EJ had forced Will's mother Sami into marrying him after raping her – and Will's dad Lucas had made a false confession to the crime to protect Will, who was 15 at the time. With this information, Nick blackmails Will into signing away his parental rights. Sonny stands by Will, as Will had already confided in him about this misdeed. Sonny confronts Nick, who admits that he is motivated by anti-gay bias, and they come to blows. It emerges that Nick's bigotry is a result of having been raped in prison by his cellmate Jensen, who abducts Nick and Gabi upon his release. Will is shot while saving Nick, and Sonny delivers Will and Gabi's daughter, Arianna; Jensen is shot and killed by the police. Nick admits to Gabi that he was blackmailing Will, and agrees to return Will's parental rights; Nick and Gabi end their relationship, and Gabi and Arianna move in with Will and Sonny, with Sonny being a parent to Arianna along with Gabi and Will.

Will and Sonny become embroiled in Sami's trial for the murder of Joe Bernardi, after they discover that Bernardi was the dirty cop who stole evidence of Will shooting EJ, and Sonny discovers that he possesses a video of an earlier fight between Sami and Bernardi. Sami is ultimately exonerated after unrelated evidence shows that Bernardi was corrupt.

Nick tries to win back Gabi, working without her knowledge to secure her a modeling job in New York City, where he is also planning to move. Upon receiving the offer, she initially plans to take the job and Sonny and Will decide to move with her in order to continue raising Arianna together. Gabi ultimately turns down the job, at which point Nick accidentally reveals his involvement; Gabi is outraged and, when Nick tries to rape her, strikes him in the head with a rock and seemingly kills him. Sami and Will's grandma Kate Roberts witness the fight and convince Gabi to dispose of the body in the river. Sonny and later Will become involved in the cover-up, unaware that Nick has survived.

=== 2014–15 ===
Sonny proposes to Will (now played by Guy Wilson); Will initially declines in favor of waiting for the right time, but he soon accepts. Marlena officiates their wedding on April 3, 2014, at the Kiriakis mansion.

Nick returns; using his knowledge of Gabi's crimes against Melanie and himself, he blackmails her into a relationship. Unaware of the blackmail, Will and Sonny express their disapproval and Gabi nearly moves out with Arianna. Will suggests they formalize a custody arrangement; at Nick's direction, Aiden Jennings draws up an agreement that would severely limit Will's parental rights, and sets up an immediate hearing. But Nick is shot and killed, at which point Gabi cancels the hearing and instead hires EJ to write up a new agreement that is fair to everyone involved in raising Arianna. Will confesses to killing Nick, because he believes Sonny committed the murder to prevent Arianna from being taken from him. This prompts the real murderer, Gabi, to turn herself in. She also confesses to her involvement in Melanie's kidnapping; Will learns Sonny knew of this, but understands his reasons for keeping the secret. Gabi is jailed, so Arianna remains in Will and Sonny's custody.

Will completes his degree and is hired to work for TruVista magazine, unaware that Sonny's Uncle Victor owns it and that Sonny arranged the job for him. His first assignment is to cover Sami's takeover of DiMera Enterprises. He learns that she is methodically destroying EJ's and Abigail's lives after discovering their affair; outraged by his mother's behavior, he writes the article as a hit piece against her. Sonny is troubled by Will's ruthlessness. Will's personal life is also rocked by the article, after his editor Zoe adds Abigail's name, obtained from Sami, to the published version. Will is initially furious to learn of Sonny's interference in his career, but soon forgives him. Zoe goes to work for a different magazine, Sonix, and Will accepts a new job with her there, where he is guaranteed final editorial approval. His first assignment, an article about Chad, who has returned to town to oversee DiMera Enterprises, is a success.

Will and Sonny's relationship suffers a series of setbacks. When EJ is murdered, Will chooses to temporarily relocate to Los Angeles with Arianna, his mother Sami and his younger siblings, in order to be the screenwriter for a movie based on Sami's life, as well as to support Sami and his siblings during their grief for EJ (the father of Will's half-siblings Johnny and Sydney). While in LA, he fails to correspond regularly with Sonny. Meanwhile, Sonny loses most of his and Will's personal savings in a bad business deal without having discussed the investment with Will.

Sonny's ex-boyfriend, closeted Major League Baseball player Paul Narita, comes to Salem (the show's fictional town) for surgery at the Salem hospital. He tries to pursue Sonny, and is disappointed to learn he is married. Will and Arianna return home to Salem after six weeks in Los Angeles. Only later Will admits that he was fired as screenwriter rather than having actively chosen to return to Sonny. Will is assigned to write a story about Paul for Sonix, who he interviews in Paul's room at the Salem Inn. Due to confidentiality, Sonny doesn't know whom Will is interviewing, and because Sonny has never talked about his exes with Will, neither Will nor Paul knows about the other's relationship with Sonny. Will suspects Paul is gay, and realizes he could get a scoop with an article about the life of a professional gay athlete, as well as help another gay man come out. Attracted to each other, Will and Paul have a night of sex in the hotel. Whilst Will is immediately remorseful, and is determined it won't happen again, he is still very keen to get the scoop, and he convinces Paul to come out in the article (which initially was to be a feature about Paul and his career-ending injury). Paul tells Will about turning down a marriage proposal from the love of his life (this is Sonny, but Paul doesn't tell Will the name) because Paul felt he could not be an out gay athlete. Will's article on Paul is published, and Sonny learns from Derrick (a bellhop who has flirted with Paul, Will, and Sonny throughout Paul's hotel stay) that Will and Paul have slept together. Before he can confront Will, Sonny is stabbed as a result of Clyde Weston's vendetta against Sonny's Uncle Victor. Sonny's life is saved by multiple transfusions of blood donated by Paul, who has responded to an emergency appeal for blood, and who only later learns that the patient is Sonny. Sonny suffers short-term memory loss, but he remembers Will's infidelity when he sees Will's article on Paul. Sonny lashes out at Paul and Will, leaving all three men devastated. Will is shocked to learn that Paul is Sonny's ex, and also that Paul had rejected Sonny's marriage proposal just before Sonny had met Will. When Sonny is released from the hospital, he leaves town to convalesce at his brother's house, and to get away from Will.

When Sonny returns to Salem, Will tries to mend his marriage with Sonny. On top of his own infidelity, Will feels insecure because of the love between Sonny and Paul, and because Will thinks he is inferior to Paul because of Paul's success and athleticism. Will's infidelity with Paul is not initially common knowledge; Adrienne slaps Will when she learns of it, and a tabloid later publicizes the affair. Paul's mother, Tori, comes to Salem. Will discovers that Tori once had a connection to Salem and the DiMera family – a connection that she keeps secret from Paul. Using this information, Will tries to blackmail Tori into getting Paul out of Salem and drafts an article identifying Paul as a DiMera. But then the actual truth comes out: Paul is John Black's son. Sonny and Will share a tender moment after Paul punches Will in the face, but then Sonny learns that Will had called Tori a whore. Will and Sonny enter marriage counseling, but Will tries to influence their therapist by secretly offering to publish a flattering profile of him. Will tries to set Paul up with Derrick; the plan succeeds until Paul realizes Will has given Derrick private information he learned in their interview. In light of Will's continued deceptions, as well as his revelation that he also cheated on Sonny with a man in LA, Sonny decides to take a job at Titan's Paris office. In Sonny's absence, Will's interactions with Paul are tense. Gabi is released from prison, and Will and Arianna welcome her back into their lives.

After looking at their wedding photos and remembering how happy he and Sonny were, Will calls Sonny and leaves a message apologizing unreservedly for his misdeeds and totally accepting responsibility for their break-up; Will says "I love you so much Sonny; and even if I never get a chance to get back together with you, I have to make this right for you. I love you!" Will then calls his mom, and excitedly tells her he is going to fly to Paris and win Sonny back. That same afternoon, Will is strangled by Ben Weston when Will inadvertently discovers evidence that Ben is the "Necktie Killer" who has recently murdered two women. Will's body is found by Gabi, and after the first-responders arrive, Will is declared to be dead.

Sonny is thrilled to receive Will's message and straightaway decides to return to Salem to reunite with Will and Arianna. Whilst packing for the trip, he is informed that Will has been murdered. Devastated, Sonny returns to Salem to bury his husband rather than reconcile with him. After Will's funeral, Sonny returns to Paris because he cannot cope being in Salem where he has so many memories of Will.

=== 2016– ===
After a nine-month absence, Sonny returns from Paris in July 2016 and resumes co-parenting Arianna with Gabi. Now Sonny is back in Salem, the love between him and Paul is re-ignited, and they go up the aisle together in the fall of 2017. However, their wedding is interrupted by Ben Weston, who breaks out of Bayview Sanitarium to tell Sonny that Will is still alive, and to stop Sonny marrying Paul. Thrown by this, Sonny won't marry Paul until the truth about Will is known . An investigation ensues. Ben is interrogated, and step by step, the investigation leads to an address in Memphis. Sonny and Paul join Sami, John, and Marlena as they go to Memphis to investigate. Paul sees Will (now Chandler Massey) working at a bar there, but he is afraid to tell Sonny, because he thinks he will lose Sonny to Will. Eventually he confesses, and Sonny and Sami dash to the bar to see Will. They find Will, only to discover that Will does not recognise them and has no memory of his life in Salem. John discovers that Will, after being strangled, was abducted by Susan Banks, who made Will believe he was her son, telling him he had lost his memory after being "shot". When she confesses, and Will realizes his life in Memphis has been a lie, he decides to return to Salem with his newly-found family, to find out who he really is.

In Salem, Will stays with his grandma Marlena, who is keen to re-introduce Will gradually to his former life. His friends and family come to visit, but even seeing his daughter Arianna does not restore his memory. Realizing Will is overwhelmed by events and new people who claim to know him, Sonny gives him space. Will's aunt Belle inadvertently lets slip that Will once made a "huge mistake", and Will presses her to reveal what it was – and she tells him that he cheated on Sonny with Paul. Will is shocked, and he goes to Paul to find out about it. Paul answers the door shirtless, and Will is struck with attraction to him. Will also likes Paul because everyone else is expecting him and wanting him to be "Will Horton", but Paul doesn't and so Will feels able to "be himself" with him. Will knows himself to be gay, but he didn't feel free to be so when he believed he was Susan's son, because she didn't approve. In an echo of Will suddenly kissing Neil – his first kiss with another man – amnesiac Will suddenly kisses Paul. In the meantime Sonny realizes he wants to be with Will, and he tells Paul it is over between them. Sonny later hears of the kiss, but his heart is resolved on Will, and he goes to Will with the intent of re-building their relationship, saying "I want my husband back". Will, however, has just learnt they are legally separated, and is enjoying his new-found freedom as an out gay man and being single. Nevertheless, after Sonny kisses him and they talk, Will cannot deny the connection he feels with Sonny; and when Sonny asks Will to move into the Kiriakis mansion (in separate bedrooms), Will decides he can trust Sonny to help him take the next step in his life. Sonny endeavours to help Will, and to help him remember their life and love. But Will cannot remember anything at all, and continues to be attracted to, and wanting to be with Paul, whom he suddenly kisses again on New Year's Eve. Will does not want to hurt Sonny, and realizing he "has no business being married to anyone", decides the best thing for everyone is to get a divorce. Sonny initially wants to fight for their marriage, but wanting Will to be happy (as Will wants Sonny to be), Sonny consents to the divorce. Will and Paul become a couple; and Sonny starts dating Leo Starke (Greg Rickaart), who turns out to be a conman who frames Sonny for sexual harassment. To help Sonny defend himself, Paul investigates Leo, and uncovers his real name and criminal record. Will delivers the file of evidence on Leo to Sonny, when he calls round to see Arianna. Leo is there, trying to blackmail Sonny into marrying him, and when Will reveals they now know his criminal history and calls Leo for the conman he is, Leo attacks Will, strangling him. Sonny pulls Leo off Will and hurls him away, and as Leo goes flying, he hits his head against the mantelpiece, and dies instantly. It's an accident, but Sonny realizes it's going to look like murder. Sonny asks Will to leave, but Will won't leave Sonny, and although Will wants to call the police, Will actually ends up helping Sonny hide Leo's body. Sonny and Will are then blackmailed by Leo's lawyer Ted Laurent (Gilles Marini) who has found the body. Will seeks his grandma Kate's help, and she scares off Laurent – but tells Will she paid him off.

in August 2018, at the wedding of Will's grandma Marlena and John Black, Will suddenly recalls Marlena marrying him and Sonny. Will experiences a cascade of memories of their wedding and their love together. Sonny encourages Will, and in an avalanche of recall, Will remembers his family, his love for them, and his entire life. Will remembers everything – and he and Sonny embrace and kiss.

== Reception and impact ==
Even if you are not a fan of Days of our Lives or soaps in general, the presence, power, and charm of the couple cannot be denied.

— HuffPost, Andrew Benkovic

TV Guide said that "while it took 45 years for the show to introduce its first openly gay character (Sonny) and another year and a half to have him find a male partner (Will), the wait was well worth it. This steamy, star-crossed saga has had drama to spare (Paranoia! Blackmail! Impossible parents!), but its real success lies in the fresh, easy charm of these two young men." TV Source Magazine named Will and Sonny Best Couple of 2012 in the Days of Our Lives series, saying "One of the most refreshing things about Will and Sonny's relationship is it's portrayed just as any heterosexual couple would be. Watching them grow from friends to being in love was one of the highlights of the year for DAYS." Will and Sonny placed ninth on Daytime Confidential's list of Summer's Best Soap Couples.

Soap journalist Michael Fairman praised Will and Sonny's wedding, saying it was "beautifully acted", with "inspired writing" and "touching speeches". Hollywood reporter Greg Hernandez called the wedding "great stuff", and said he was "wiping away tears left and right". He confessed, "I used to get lost in fantasy as a teenager that I would marry a guy" and explained how his imagined festivities were very much like Will and Sonny's wedding. He was thrilled that "with gay marriage becoming legal in a growing number of states" his fantasy "can actually come true for young gay people dreaming about that today", and he said "that is why I will be forever grateful to this soap for giving us this episode, this wedding that was filled with love and supportive family and friends. It's the way it should be and always should have been", and he "loved every minute of it". When on June 26, 2015, the Supreme Court of the United States ruled to make same-sex marriage a right across all states of the US, soapcentral.com took a look back at US daytime drama's first gay weddings, with Will and Sonny's being the first male-male wedding and Bianca and Reese on All My Children being the first female-female wedding, saying both were "incredibly special".

Soap Opera Digest disliked the marital conflict of Will and Sonny They remarked: "When Will and Sonny tied the knot, it was a groundbreaking moment based in love, which is why it is impossible to comprehend why the show spent the better half of the last two years trying so hard to unravel this historic union". Digest criticized the writing, and complained that Will "inexplicably succumbed" to Paul's advances and that it added "insult to injury" when it was subsequently revealed that Will had had a previous episode of infidelity when off the show. Greg Hernandez said it was like Will had a "sudden personality transplant", and "none of it feels true".

The murder of Will met with widespread criticism. Soap Opera Digest called it "sick and violent", and James Lott Jr of AfterBuzz TV said Will's murder was a "jump the shark moment", and the "biggest mistake" the show could make. Hollywood reporter Greg Hernandez was "disgusted that such an important character would be killed off in such a dark and quick way after the journey viewers had been on with him the past five years or so", saying it was "disrespectful" and "unforgivable really".

News of Will's revival was welcomed by critics and fans. In an article entitled "Sonny Kiriakis & Will Horton Had the Most Important Relationship in TV", and subtitled "WilSon need to be a thing again" Kristyn Burtt of SheKnows said: "The return of Chandler Massey to Days of Our Lives this fall has been a huge watershed moment for NBC. The character of Will Horton and his love story with Sonny Kiriakis, played by Freddie Smith, was a groundbreaking one on television. It really is a romance for the ages," and asked "is a WilSon reconciliation coming up on the horizon? Let's hope so because Days threw away one of their most impactful relationships in soap history for a salacious serial killer storyline."

The story event of Will regaining his life's memories and his love for Sonny attracted praise for both actors, the writing, and the staging. Soapcentral.com said "the WilSon magic was back", and Fairman said "WilSon fan or non-WilSon fan, these scenes made a strong case that one of the best duos on daytime drama, period, is Will and Sonny," and Massey's performance "was everything anyone could have hoped it would be and more".

In 2020, Charlie Mason from Soaps She Knows placed Will and Sonny jointly at #24 on a list of the 35 most memorable characters from Days of Our Lives, commenting "Judge us if you must for making Freddie Smith and Chandler Massey's gay supercouple share an entry. After all that they've been through, we just couldn't bear to separate the harried marrieds again."

== Awards ==
Days of Our Lives won the GLAAD Media Award for Outstanding Daily Drama in 2012, 2013, 2014, and 2015, in recognition of the characters and stories of Sonny and Will, and related characters.

Chandler Massey won the Daytime Emmy for Outstanding Younger Actor in a Drama Series — never before won for a gay character — three years in a row, in 2012, 2013, and 2014; and Freddie Smith won the same award in 2015.

== See also ==
- Will Horton
- Sonny Kiriakis
- Supercouple
- List of supercouples
- Luke Snyder and Noah Mayer
- List of LGBT firsts by year
- Same-sex marriage in the United States
