= Ben Weston (Days of Our Lives) =

- Days of Our Lives character
- Robert Scott Wilson as Ben Weston
- Portrayed by: Justin Gaston (2014); Robert Scott Wilson (2014–2023)
- Duration: 2014–2023
- First appearance: February 26, 2014
- Last appearance: March 24, 2023
- Created by: Gary Tomlin and Christopher Whitesell
- Introduced by: Ken Corday, Lisa de Cazotte and Greg Meng (2014); Ken Corday, Greg Meng and Albert Alarr (2016)
- Spin-off appearances: Days of Our Lives: Beyond Salem (2021–2022)
In-universe information
- Other names: Benjamin Oliver Weston; Austin Reed; Ben Rogers (2014); Oliver "Ollie" Weston; Kevin Reynolds; Necktie Killer; Batty Ben
- Occupation: Bodyguard; Security guard Bartender; Waiter; Mechanic
- Father: Clyde Weston
- Half-sisters: Jordan Ridgeway
- Spouse: Ciara Brady (2020–2021, 2021–present)
- Children: Bo Weston; Addie Weston

Ben Weston is a fictional character from Days of Our Lives, an American soap opera on the NBC network, most notably portrayed by Robert Scott Wilson. The role was originated by Justin Gaston in 2014, as Ben Rogers, when the character was introduced as the new love interest of Abigail Deveraux (Kate Mansi), and was later revealed to be the estranged brother of Jordan Ridgeway (Chrishell Stause).

Soon after, Wilson was hired as a recast and the writers began exploring the character's dark past with the introduction of his abusive criminal father Clyde Weston (James Read). In 2015, the romantic triangle between Ben, Abigail and Chad DiMera (Billy Flynn) culminates in Ben becoming a serial killer, known as the "Necktie Killer," claiming several victims, including legacy character Will Horton (Guy Wilson/Chandler Massey).

Wilson vacated the role in late 2015 and would reprise the role for multiple guest stints before returning to the show as a series regular on June 1, 2018. Upon his return, then-head writer Ron Carlivati began to redeem the character through his friendship and eventual romance with Ciara Brady (Victoria Konefal), whom he later married and had a son and daughter with.

== Storylines ==
Ben (Justin Gaston) comes to Salem in 2014 where he lands a job as a waiter at Club TBD and runs into his estranged sister Jordan Ridgeway. Ben is immediately smitten with Abigail while Jordan tries to chase Ben out of town fearing someone will uncover their past but he calms her fears. Jordan tries to chase Ben out of town fearing someone will uncover their past but Ben is too smitten with Abigail Deveraux to care. Ben and Jordan are horrified when their abusive father Clyde comes to town demanding the money they stole from him. Ben is surprised when Clyde changes his tune and gives Jordan back her life's savings. Meanwhile, Ben grows closer to Abby despite her ex-boyfriend Chad DiMera attempts to sabotage his budding romance with Abigail and the life he's building in Salem. Ben gets himself arrested when he attacks Chad in public after Chad throws his sexual relationships with Abby and Jordan in his face. Clyde reveals that the DiMeras bribed the casino manager to testify against Ben. However, the witness is found dead and charges are dropped. Ben is suspicious when Chad helps Abby get her job back at the hospital and Ben in turn convinces her to move in with him. Ben follows Abigail to the DiMera mansion where he finds Abigail has slept with Chad. Instead of confronting her, Ben proposes to Abigail after Clyde gifts him with his late mother's engagement ring. Ben is even more excited to learn that Abby is pregnant. As they begin planning their wedding, Clyde offers to buy the couple a house as wedding gift. Meanwhile, Ben warns Abigail to keep her distance from Chad who has been implicated in the murders of Serena Mason (Melissa Archer) and Paige Larson (True O'Brien). Realizing Abigail can't stay away from Chad, Ben convinces her to leave town with him after the wedding. The killer then attacks Doctor Marlena Evans (Deidre Hall) and Chad "interrupts" the confrontation. When Chad goes on the run, Ben changes his mind about moving. On September 24, 2015, Ben is revealed to be "The Necktie Killer" when he is shown dumping evidence into the river. Ben ask Abigail's cousin Will Horton (Guy Wilson) to be the best man at their wedding. Meanwhile, Ben is furious when his future brother-in-law JJ Deveraux (Casey Moss) gets Clyde arrested for drug trafficking and they nearly come to blows. In October 2015, Ben claims another victim when he strangles Will to death as Will has discovered Ben is the killer. Ben once again, frames Chad for the murder. Chad realizes Ben is the killer and confronts him but Ben beats him into a coma. Ben claims that Chad broke in and attacked him because he is obsessed with Abby. As Clyde is extradited, Ben confesses to the killings and Clyde promises to keep his secret. Ben takes Abby to a secluded where she goes into premature labor. Ben calls a midwife Wendy (Denice Duff), to help Abigail deliver the baby. After the birth, Ben shoots Wendy and buries her in the woods. Chad comes to Abby's rescue but Ben ties them up together, sets the cabin on fire and runs off with the baby whom Ben has named Colin. However, Ben is apprehended by JJ and Lani Price (Sal Stowers) and taken back to Salem. When Chad and Abigail confront him, Ben has seemingly lost his grip on reality. Despite his condition, Ben tells Abby where he left the baby and he is then put on a 24-hour suicide watch and taken to jail.

In April 2016, Ben breaks into the DiMera mansion and he is shocked when Abigail professes her love for him. When Ben lets his guard down, Abigail stabs him and knocks him out. Ben wakes up tied to the bed and a deranged Abigail sets him on fire. Chad arrives just in time to put the fire out but Ben's legs are severely burned. The police take Ben into custody and district attorney Justin Kiriakis (Wally Kurth) concludes that Ben was sane enough to escape the hospital, and Ben is sent to prison instead of back to the mental hospital.

In September 2017, Ben crashes Chad and Abigail's double wedding with Sonny Kiriakis (Freddie Smith) and Paul Narita (Christopher Sean) to announce that Sonny's husband Will (Chandler Massey) is still alive. Ben tells Marlena that Clyde told him Will is alive. Later, Will's mother Sami Brady (Alison Sweeney) convinces Ben to reenact Will's "murder" to cure his amnesia. However, Ben can't bring himself to hurt Will again and Sami has him locked away again.

In June 2018, Marlena visits Ben and questions his mental state as he is due to be released from the sanitarium. Ben says it was the incident with Sami and Will that caused his breakthrough. Ben promises to make amends for the pain he caused. Upon release, Ben visits Will to apologize and Chad orders him out of town. When Chad ditches him at the edge of town, Ben finds Ciara Brady (Victoria Konefal) after a motorcycle crash. Ben promises he has changed and convinces her to let him tend to her wounds. They bond as Ben cares for her and she begins to trust him. However, Ben unravels when he can't fill his medication due to the Salem police putting out an APB on him and Ciara. Paranoid Ben has hallucinations of Clyde who tries to convince him that Ciara turned him in. Ciara talks him down and Ben goes to the pharmacy to get his medication only to return to Ciara's police commissioner mother, Hope (Kristian Alfonso) and Rafe Hernandez (Galen Gering) rescue Ciara from the burning cabin. Ben is arrested for arson but swears he is innocent and Ciara hires Ted Laurent (Gilles Marini) as his attorney. After his release, Ben is attacked by Paige's mother Eve Donovan (Kassie DePaiva) and turns to Ciara for help. After the police rule the fire was an accident, Hope agrees to drop the charges if Ben skips town. However, Ciara invites Ben to move in with her, her boyfriend Tripp Dalton (Lucas Adams) and her niece Claire (Olivia Rose Keegan). Ben was arrested after Tripp planted evidence against him. He was then let go, He soon learned the truth and informed Ciara about it. He chose not to press charges against Tripp. He starts dating newly single Ciara. He also saves her from the burning fire after his sister Jordan Ridgeway abducts her. Ben takes Ciara to the hospital where Ciara is admitted for inhaling too much smoke. Jordan shows up in Ciara's room and knocks Ben out. When he regains his consciousness, he stops Jordan from hurting Ciara, he almost kills her with a syringe but is stopped by Rafe Hernandez. Feeling guilty for almost hurting the sister who raised him, he visits her at the police station and apologizes to her. He then figures out that it was Claire Brady who set both the fires at the Mammoth Falls Cabin and the Horton cabin that almost killed Ciara, Tripp and Haley Chen. He saves Tripp and Haley, but gets wrongly accused of setting the fire and gets arrested. At the SPD, he confides in Ciara and they secretly conspire against Claire. Looking for work he meets garage mechanic, Jake Lambert, who looks exactly like his deceased friend and former boss, Stefan DiMera. Jake hires him. With a source of income, he feels he can propose to Ciara. They are married by Julie with many in attendance. As they walk the church aisle to leave, an explosive goes off injuring many and burying Ben under debris. Emergency, fire and police responders are unable to find Ben. It is revealed that Ben has been taking captive and brought to New York City. He is bound when he awakens and Eve Donovan reveals herself as his captor with help from a man named Vincent. Eve is still grieving the murder of her daughter, Paige, at the hands of Ben. She and Vincent torture and brainwash Ben with mind-altering drugs. They program him to kill Ciara. He is found by Ciara and Hope. Ben and Ciara later get re-married after Ciara was presumed dead after being captured by Evan Frears and then loses her memory but regains it after reuniting with Ben, and the two later have two children together, Bo Weston (named after Ciara's father, Bo Brady) and Addie Weston (named after Ciara's grandmother Addie Horton).

== Development ==
=== Casting and creation ===
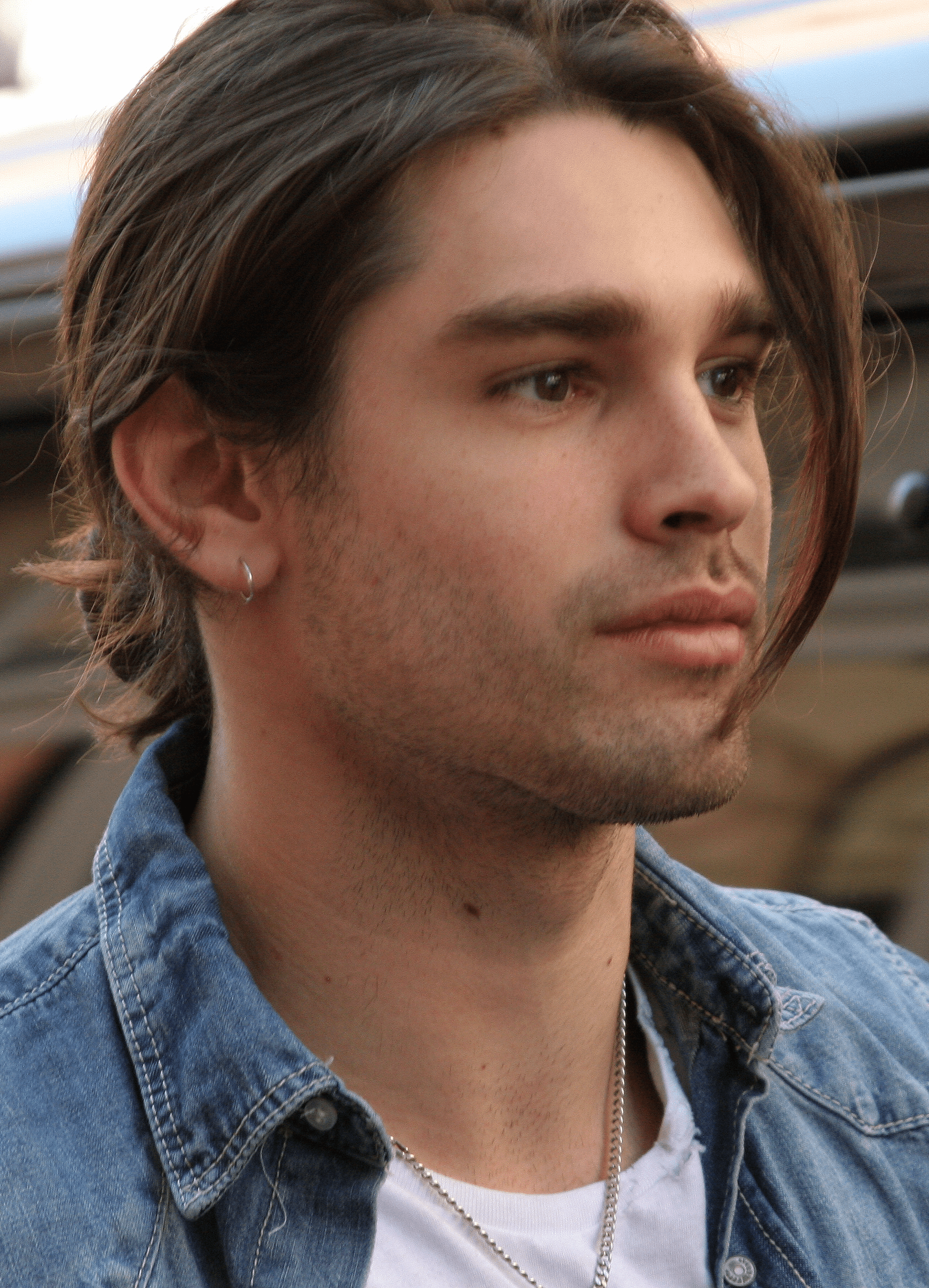
Justin Gaston originated the role of Ben Rogers on February 26, 2014.

In the summer of 2013 Soap Opera Digest reported that the soap had put out two separate casting calls, one of which was for the role of Ben. In February 2014, it was reported that actor and country singer Justin Gaston, known for his appearance on the television series, Nashville Star had been cast in the contract role of Ben. Gaston filmed his first scenes in October 2013 and was slated to make his first appearance on February 26, 2014.

During the week of April 7, 2014, rumors circulated that Gaston had been replaced by actor Robert Scott Wilson, with neither actor nor the show commented on the speculation. On April 14, 2014, Soap Opera Digest confirmed the rumor and reported that Gaston was indeed replaced by Wilson, known for being the first male model on The Price Is Right and his portrayal of Peter Cortlandt in the short-lived online reboot of the ABC soap, All My Children. Wilson commented on the news that he would soon depart from the game show, and thanked fans. The following day, Wilson confirmed his final appearance on The Price is Right as April 15, and assured fans that he was not leaving on bad terms but did not comment on his new gig at Days of Our Lives. Wilson made his debut on May 22, 2014. At the time, Wilson was testing for another project on Fox. When the project fell through, Wilson returned to Boston to visit his family for Christmas which is when he learned he got the job. "It came at a time when I didn't expect," Wilson told Soap Opera Digest. Ironically, Wilson had just purchased a brand new Mercedes-Benz the week before booking the gig. "Fortune favors the bold" he said of his luck. He started filming on January 8, 2014, and had filmed twelve episodes by the end of February. Wilson accredited his landing the role to his time on All My Children and his former costar Jill Larson. Wilson also found common ground with former AMC alum, Chrishell Stause who played Ben's sister, Jordan and said Stause and [Kate] Mansi helped him make the transition. After landing the gig, Wilson learned he would also be working opposite [Kristian] Alfonso, another Boston native.

In a November 2020 interview with Michael Fairman, Wilson disclosed he received the casting call for Ben in 2013, and was unable to audition, due to his commitment for All My Children. He also credited the late Lisa de Cazotte for his casting in the role.

=== Characterization ===
==== Personality ====
The original casting call described Ben as being in his early to mid 20s, a “gorgeous, Caucasian, country boy.” He is supposed to be Midwestern or Southern. The casting notice also described Ben as “utterly charming” due to his “honest sincere approach to life and love.” The producers looked for actors with a musical background. According to Soap Central, musical talent was not a requirement for those auditioning for the role. Ben was also said to have a "slight southern accent." Wilson described the character as being "a little more generic in the beginning." "He's kind of a loner. He's traveled and can read people very well." However, Ben can be a bit unpredictable, and according to Wilson, "he's a loose cannon." Ben has a lot of rage because he comes from a "messed-up home." Wilson described Ben as a "good guy" who isn't afraid to "put somebody in line if he has to." Unlike his former role as Pete, "With Ben, I'm playing more of a hungry person." Wilson further described Ben as "very street-smart" and the typical "nice guy." However, he can be a protective of his loved ones. In an interview with On-Air On-Soaps, Wilson explained that Ben has a "temper" that can get him into trouble. Ben has a "protective nature" because of his past.

==== Backstory ====
Wilson later admitted that he didn't know much about the character when he assumed the role of Ben. "[The producers] really only gave me what I needed to know to make it real and understandable to me." Wilson revealed that the producers gave him a lot "creative control" when it came to his character's backstory. Wilson revealed that he and Ben share a similar background because he too comes "from humble beginnings." Ben is born Oliver "Ollie" Weston on March 13, 1989 in the small city of Poplar Bluff, Missouri. Wilson stated, "Ben has pretty much always been broke" and he's never experienced any real "stability in his life." "I had to come up with my own backstory for things to work for me as the story went further" the actor explained. Wilson said of his character that "Ben has lived a crazy life. Ben hopes to make a home for himself by settling in the same town as his sister Jordan. Though Ben is the younger of the siblings, he has "stepped up" for Jordan and tries to be a father figure for her and protect her as payback for her raising him. However, Ben's plans are threatened by the arrival of his father, Clyde Weston. Ben "very wary of Clyde" because he only has bad memories of him. While Clyde and Ben want the same thing, to build a father-son relationship, Clyde's schemes constantly undermines any progress they make.

=== Relationship with Abigail ===
The character is paired with Abigail Deveraux in a romantic storyline. Wilson explained that Abigail is the first girl to make Ben want to "settle down" and have a stable relationship. "It's all really new to him." Ben's secret past jeopardizes his budding romance with Abigail because "He's not yet ready to tell her... but if everything is good at the end of the tunnel" Ben will come clean. Wilson formed a close bond with his costar Mansi which he said helped with their onscreen chemistry. Ben doesn't hold Abigail's past against her because "Everybody's got baggage" Wilson said. Ben can understand and identity with Abby having a trouble past "because he's far from perfect himself." Abby and Ben's new romance is also threatened by return of her ex-boyfriend Chad DiMera. Abigail is forced to choose between staying faithful to Ben and protecting him from a potential prison stint when he gets arrested for assaulting Chad. After an affair with Chad, which Ben witnesses, Abigail ends up pregnant and is unsure of her baby's paternity. Ben is so desperate to make a better life for himself that he willingly overlooks Abigail's cheating. "That's always in the back of Ben's head" Wilson stated. So, Ben is faced with the task of burying those feelings and staying focused on "his ultimate goal of having a family and becoming stable." He continued, "Abigail is the puzzle piece that will make all of that possible." Wilson further stated that this is the first relationship where Ben has "found something to invest in" and he is afraid to lose that so when he learns she is pregnant, Ben holds on tighter. However, "it's eating him alive" Wilson said of Abigail seemingly being drawn to Chad. But, he finds comfort in Abby's reassurances which keep him grounded in the "reality that he knows." Wilson said he'd advise his character to leave Abigail and the town of Salem behind but admitted "Love makes you do wild stuff."

=== The Necktie killer (2015) ===
Wilson on killer Ben

I ran with it because I got what I wanted: a chance to play Ben in a total arc, taking him from one set of character traits to a completely different type of person. From an acting standpoint it was very rewarding. It was great to have some real, tangible information about Ben's backstory, and seeing the character given more depth, no matter what direction it took.

— Robert Scott Wilson, Soap Opera Digest (2015)

In April 2015, during an interview for Soapcentral.com, Wilson said that viewers will "learn more about Ben in the next six months." The actor continued, "It's a whole other side of Ben, and I'm really excited to kind of unravel it." Wilson welcomed the shift in the direction of his character. "I was getting bored out of my mind. So thank God. It's time for the cycle to change." Wilson admitted that Ben develops "more of a wild streak than ever."

In the summer of 2015, Entertainment Weekly reported that the series would launch a Murder mystery plot in late August as the show was to celebrate its 50th anniversary. The plot would feature several characters, including some fan favorites as victims. The story was slated to climax during the week of November 8, 2015, the official anniversary date. On the episode which aired on September 24, 2015, the episode culminates with the revelation that Wilson's Ben is the mysterious Necktie Killer when he is shown going over the evidence. Wilson was invited to a meeting with executive producer Albert Alarr and then headwriter Josh Griffith where they informed him of the plans for Ben. Wilson was immediately excited about the story. In 2018, Wilson said of the story, "I didn’t see it as a door closing. I saw it as a way to stretch as an actor." But, Wilson initially felt some apprehension about the decision. "They either want me to fail… or they trust me." But the producers quickly assured the actor it was the latter. And once he got into it, Wilson felt the changes allowed for him to play the role more "honestly." Wilson admitted that the way he worked changed "Because they were writing for me. They wrote me an amazing story, which ended up being the threat of the entire show. They trusted me with it." In an interview with Soapcentral.com, Wilson said "I got to really know Ben and attack him and play it out to its fullest. I'm grateful they wrote as much as they did and really took the time on the story. They put a lot of care into it, and we all stepped up." Wilson described the plot twist as "some of the most fulfilling work of my career."

He said of the character change, "It's really night and day" from the Ben viewers had come to know. Wilson relished in portraying the "bad guy." The actor was very grateful because "they really did write for Ben" and that allowed him to take a lot of "chances and risks." He continued, "I played things that I had never done." In an interview with Michael Fairman from On-Air On-Soaps, Wilson revealed that when the story started filming, even he was not aware that Ben was the killer. Ben dumps the evidence in the river believing he has covered his tracks. The scenes were filmed in one take and Wilson later revealed that he wanted to re-shoot the scenes because he knew the fans wouldn't miss a beat and would notice that there was air in the bag – which would keep it from sinking. Ben is able to "keep his game face on" in public, until he is alone and "can kind of revel in what has happened." In private, Ben takes "deep breathes, and try to regain his composure."

==== Victims ====
The killer's first victim is Serena Mason, played by Melissa Archer, who had recently announced her departure from the series. Serena is found strangled to death and Chad is implicated as a suspect because of their drunken confrontation the night before. Less than a month later, the killer claims another victim when Paige Larson (True O'Brien) is strangled to death with a red necktie. Chad once again appears to be the prime suspect as he had been harassing Paige who had witnessed the altercation with Serena. Following Paige's murder, there was immediate speculation that Ben was framing Chad or that Clyde had framed Chad on Ben's behalf. On the episode that aired on September 24, 2015, the killer tries and fails to kill one of the show's most iconic characters, Marlena Evans, portrayed by veteran actress Deidre Hall. Wilson later admitted that he wasn't too enthused about Ben's choice of victims, specifically O'Brien's character. "That one got me the most because True is so young" Wilson explained.

During the interview with Fairman, Wilson confirmed that Ben would take more lives. "There is a lot more to this story" he teased. "The body count will rise" he declared. On the episode which aired on October 9, 2015, Ben would claim a third, and most significant victim – Will Horton (Guy Wilson) as he discovers Ben is the killer. Until Will, Ben is "somebody who doesn't know what he's doing." It is Will's death that forces Ben to face the reality of his actions. Before the episode aired, Wilson identified Will's murder as the turning point for Ben: "That’s the full change for him. When that happens, then he will be aware of everything that is happening in real time, rather than playing this game where he is thinking he is doing something right, when it’s not."

==== Motives and psychosis ====
The reveal episode also featured scenes in which Ben changes his mind about leaving town with Abigail when he learns there is an APB out for Chad. Ben feels a sense of "closure" hinting at his motives. According to Wilson, Ben's actions stem from love, "as tragic as it all is. It's done out of love, but unfortunately he is going insane." Ben who has "constantly" buried his feelings about Abigail's betrayal has reached the end of his rope. Dealing with Abigail's betrayal is such a new experience for Ben because he's never really had anything to lose. "Everything Ben does is to set Chad up" Wilson stated. Ben never intends to hurt anyone. Ben sees his victims as "chess pieces" in a much bigger game – they will help him hold onto the life he has made for himself. As far as Ben is concerned, he is doing the "right thing."

The writers took it a step further in the development of the story by portraying Ben as having suffered some sort of psychological break creating two distinct personalities for himself. The Ben viewers meet in 2014 is the "nice guy" who is just a bartender and Abigail's boyfriend. He "takes the hand of the little princess [Abigail] of Salem." But then, there is "Benjamin" who experiences "blackouts" and blames Chad for his behavior. From Ben's perspective, Chad is responsible for the murders. Though Wilson insisted that Ben does not have a split personality, "Benjamin is another part of Ben's personality that acted as his protector." To help prepare for his portrayal of Ben, Wilson did some research with similar characters. He studied Anthony Perkins portrayal of Norman Bates in the 1960 film Psycho as well as Edward Norton's character in the 1996 film Primal Fear – who deals with a split personality. Wilson also watched several documentaries about the lives of serial killers. "If somebody were to see my Netflix queue during that time they probably would have asked, 'What's up with this guy?'" he said jokingly. However, in his research, Wilson recognized that Ben becoming a killer was entirely possible. "The writers tapped into Ben's childhood, when he suffered abuse. That was the place where a lot of evil was rooted." Tapping into that part of his psyche, "worked for me as an actor" Wilson explained. "It is truly a great experience to go through as an actor, and weird at the same time."

=== Departure (2015) ===
While he was initially excited about the storyline, Wilson knew there was a strong possibility that once the story wrapped, he could be out of a job. As the serial killer story was set to climax in the fall, Soaps SheKnows reported that Wilson would likely vacate the role of Ben Weston when the story wrapped. However, neither Wilson nor the producers would comment on the actor's status with the series. Wilson intentionally played coy during another interview in November 2015. When asked if he was coming or going, the actor "It's a little bit of both. Maybe he's gone and then he's back and then he's gone. Maybe he's just among us. Maybe he's something that you can't get rid of." Wilson seemingly vacated the role on December 8, 2015, when Ben goes to prison. By the time of his departure, Wilson felt that Ben had completed his arc. Despite reports that Wilson was done with the series, the actor continued posting pictures on social media of himself on the set.

=== Returns (2016–2017) ===
In January 2016 it was announced that Wilson would reprise his role as Ben. The actor reappeared onscreen on March 11. Wilson revealed that Albert Alarr informed him toward the end of his first arc of the plans to bring the character back. However, this is a "new chapter" for Ben. "This is now a fresh arc for myself and what I make for Ben." According to Wilson, Ben returns because he misses Salem, having found a home for himself there and "because he wants to know what's going on" and he somehow sees beyond what he has done. As Abigail prepares to marry Chad, it is reported that Ben has escaped the mental hospital. However, when Abby sees Ben at her wedding, he appears to be a figment of her imagination. Chad and JJ orchestrate a plan to lure Ben out of hiding, using Abigail as bait. However, Abigail's hallucinations get worse as the possibility that Ben is looming becomes even more real.

During the week of April 11, 2016, Ben and Abigail come face to face. "It's the real deal and not a figment of Abigail's imagination" Wilson confirmed. At that point, it is a game of cat and mouse. The confrontation culminates with Ben to a bed and Abigail setting him on fire, as he had previously done to her and Chad. Wilson's costar Kate Mansi told Soap Opera Digest about filming the scenes. "From the minute we arrived on set, Robert and I felt the weight of that encounter" the actress explained. The actors didn't even rehearse together as usual. The taping was delayed due to a lighting problem so they took advantage of the downtime and "We didn't take our eyes off each other" allowing for the tension to build. The actors then utilized the remainder of the time to run through their scenes, without any dialogue. When the lighting situation was fixed, "Robert and I just let ourselves get out of the way and went for the ride without any hesitation." Wilson concluded his run with the series on June 24, 2016. The return also helped facilitate Kate Mansi's departure from the series. "I'm so grateful to have been a part of her last episode" Wilson said.

In September 2017, it was announced the Wilson was set to reprise his role in late September, under new head writer Ron Carlivati. Wilson was very enthusiastic about the return. "I couldn't have asked for a better entrance back to Salem – when no one sees it coming." Just about everyone in town has converged on the church for a double wedding "and then I got to swing the church doors open and drop a bomb" the actor explained to Soap Opera Digest. Ben announces to a packed room that Will Horton is alive upsetting the event. For Ben, this is "great news." Ben considered Will to be a friend so "Ben is trying to clear his conscience, and hopefully, clear his name as well." However, Ben has more than one agenda and sees it as a chance to stick it to those who have wronged him because he blames the people of Salem for turning him into what he has become. Ben takes pleasure in taunting everyone about Will being alive, which upsets Will's closest relatives. However, Ben cannot produce Will. "That's part of the mystery. He's hoping Will can be found."

Wilson was contacted in the spring of 2017 about returning to the series. The producers told him a little bit about the story, stating: "It sounded like really great stuff, and they were correct. I had a blast." While he was welcomed back, a lot had changed with the serial. "In a short amount of time, they really spread Ben out, and he interacts with a lot of different characters," Wilson said, while also stating he was definitely open to another return in the future. Wilson wrapped his stint on November 30, 2017, when Ben is sent back to the mental institution.

=== Reintroduction and redemption ===
Carlivati on Ben's return

I thought he was fascinating character and wondered about his redemption and the possibility of a new lease on life. Obviously he's a polarizing person who affects so many other characters, so the situation that's being set up is that the whole town is going to be united against him.

— Ron Carlivati, Soap Opera Digest (2018)

In January 2018, Wilson revealed that he had visited the set which led to rumors of another return. Later, actress Denice Duff announced that she would also reprise her role as midwife Wendy Taylor, which fueled speculation. Soaps.com stated that Duff would reappear alongside Wilson in May 2018. On April 26, 2018, Soap Opera Digest announced that Wilson signed a new contract and would return as a series regular. "I'm really grateful," Wilson said to in a statement to the magazine. "I love what Ron [Carlivati, head writer] and the whole team has been doing with him thus far, so I'm really excited to see where they take him after this." Wilson credited his co-star Deidre Hall (Marlena) with being partly responsible for his return. "She kind of rallied for me be back there" he said. "After our scenes, she'd say, 'Get this kid a contract.'"

Wilson said "You can get caught in that stagnant place on shows sometimes and it's nice to come back and revamp a storyline or maybe create something new and just be inspired. We've got a good thing going, so I think that's why I'll be sticking around a little bit longer." Wilson saw the return as a chance to grow the character as well as "work my own instrument a little bit more." While there would obviously be opposition from other characters on the canvas, "there's also maybe some people that can hear his side of the story now and might believe in [Ben] a little bit more." In an article for Soap Hub, Janet Di Lauro questioned exactly how the character could be integrated into the canvas, despite his past. "It's time for a magical rewrite or convoluted explanation," she said.

In an interview with Michael Maloney for TV Insider, Wilson said "The show has come up with a phenomenal way to bring Ben full circle and putting him in a different light without losing his edge. They're writing the balance between vulnerability and danger." Wilson said to Soap Hub that maintaining the character's edge is the "trough line for everything." The writing leaves one wondering if, "at any moment" could Ben "slip back into that dangerous mental space." The writers paired Wilson with Deidre Hall's character, resident shrink, Marlena Evans, as she examines his mental stability upon hearing the news that he is rehabilitated. Laurisa from Soapcentral.com argued that the extreme circumstances of the parallel plot in which Abigail avoided prison after killing someone due to a psychotic break made Ben's return more plausible. "A psychiatrist has deemed him sane, which the show can't shoot down in a light of Abigail's storyline." Wilson described Marlena as the "gatekeeper to get Ben back into the world of Salem." Of Ben's state of mind, Wilson said "He had a chance to find himself, do some heavy reading and find God, maybe. He is medicated. He has been cleared and deemed sane. And he's okay."

Wilson on playing Ben

Ben's got his baggage and his demons, and he's such a layered character, and I'm finding new colors, and it's really been fun. I enjoy going to work every day. I'm getting some really gritty work, and that's all you can ask for, good work.

— Robert Scott Wilson, Boston Herald (2018)

Wilson revealed that Ben would interact with many of the characters he shared history with in addition to new faces. One of those new faces would be Victoria Konefal who played legacy character Ciara Brady. "Well he needs somebody to support him" the actor stated. Even with support from Marlena and Ciara, "it's a struggle for him" Wilson stated. Ben chooses to return to Salem "because he wants to make amends.… And not everybody wants that." Ben is "developing a sense of worth." In an interview with the Boston Herald, Wilson said Ben is "trying to be a better person. It's going to get uglier before it gets prettier, and that's my favorite part." Wilson appreciated that the pacing: "They've done a great job telling this story, of not rushing it or brushing anything under the rug. There isn't an easy road to redemption, and this audience will see the struggle for Ben to prove himself." Within 2 months, Janet Di Lauro said the show had successfully made Ben an "anti-hero" with three plot points: "Marlena's blessing," his saving Ciara's life, and most significantly, Ben keeping his distance from Abigail. "The old Ben would have been on her doorstep wreaking havoc immediately. The new Ben has clearly moved on, because he is a healed man, and one DAYS has somehow transformed into an anti-hero."

== Reception ==
=== General ===
In response to the original casting call looking for attractive actors, Luke Kerr said, "Finding beautiful actors is all well and good, but please make sure they can act before letting them sign on the dotted line." On-Air On-Soaps said "Gaston fits the bill perfectly" considering his musical background. In response to the recast, Omar Nobles of TVSource Magazine said, "I am THRILLED with this news." He continued and praised Wilson for his charm and charisma. Nobles stated, "I rank this recast as an instant UPGRADE." Wilson ranked at #10 on Daytime Confidential's list of the "10 Best Soap Newbies of 2013" having recently wrapped short lived stint on All My Children. Wilson's appearance on the list was only days after he had secretly booked the role of Ben. Wilson also ranked at #3 on the soap blog's list of the "10 Daytime Soap Opera Hunks We'd Love to Take Underwear Shopping." Jamey Giddens said, "Is it any wonder CBS Daytime decided to make Robert Scott Wilson the first-ever male model on The Price is Right? Since then, the gorgeous hunk has proven to have impressive chops on two daytime soaps." Despite Wilson being a popular casting choice, the writing for his character was very poorly received. Daytime Confidential listed the exploration of the character's backstory at #2 in its list of the "10 Worst Soap Opera Storylines of 2014." The blog admitted that had the actors (including Wilson's costars Chrishell Stause and James Read) been cast in a more established roles, "we doubt they'd be on a worst list." The site specifically said he should have been cast in the role of Andrew Donovan, son of supercouple Shane and Kimberly (Charles Shaughnessy and Patsy Pease) and brother to Theresa Donovan (Jen Lilley). On the character's love triangle with Abigail and Chad, Giddens said it "isn't exactly compelling" and he also reiterated that the character of Andrew Donovan would've been better for story purposes.

In 2020, Charlie Mason from Soaps She Knows placed Ben at #33 on their list of the 35 most memorable characters from Days of Our Lives, saying that "If you had told us a few years ago that Days of Our Lives was going to transform Robert Scott Wilson’s Necktie Killer into its foremost romantic lead, we’d have laughed our butts off. And then we’d have had to say, “Sorry, our bad. You nailed it.”"

=== Serial killer ===
While the character was initially not well received, the shocking serial killer plot and Wilson's portrayal led to Ben becoming a fan favorite. One blog christened the character with the nickname "Batty Ben" while TVSource Magazine hailed Ben as "The sexiest serial killer in soap history." Wilson received critical acclaim in the soap press and many were quite surprised the actor did not receive Daytime Emmy Award nomination for his work. However, Ben's multiple return stints garnered the series multiple daytime Emmy nominations, and wins, including the Daytime Emmy Award for Outstanding Drama Series in 2018. The Boston Herald also praised Wilson for "bringing vulnerability, remorse and a bit of mystery" to Ben during his redemption plot in 2018.

Michael Maloney described becoming a soap serial killer as "a thankless role" but credited Wilson's "compelling performances" with garnering "rave reviews." Jamey Giddens of Daytime Confidential initially praised the serial killer storyline and said "The latest in a long line of DAYS serial killers is giving the show back its life" by getting rid of the "nonessential characters" like Serena and Paige. "Praise Soap Jesus" Giddens exclaimed. Ironically, Giddens hoped the killer's next victims would be Ben and Clyde Weston. Michael Fairman of On-Air On-Soaps praised the scenes in which Ben was revealed to be the serial killer. Soap Central's Kambra Clifford described the plot twist as "hellish" and "devilishly dark." Soap Shows described Wilson's official confirmation of Ben as the serial killer as a "spoilers reveal like no other." Soap Shows christened the character with the nickname "Batty Ben" and said "he's become the creepiest Salem man around." The blog further commented that "Robert Scott Wilson appears to be having a blast playing an on-the-edge psycho who could flip at any moment." Donald of Canyon News said the storyline and character reignited his interest in the soap. Wilson "played Ben with devious perfection." Initially, many viewers responded on social media and message boards in denial as many refused to believe that Ben was the killer.

On-Air On-Soaps headline

DAYS Decimates Will Horton! Should Ben Have Brutally Murdered This Once Legacy Character?

— Michael Fairman, On-Air On-Soaps (2015)

However, Ben's third victim in Will Horton would stir up quite a bit of controversy with many questioning the decision to kill off such an important character. Michael Fairman described the fans as having "mixed-emotions" on social media. Viewer emotions over Will's murder ranged from "utterly shocked and heartbroken" to "outraged." Some viewers described the character's death as "unnecessary" while others "could not stop crying" and others believed the character "deserved better" and the decision made some "sick." Days superstar Alison Sweeney who played Will's mother Sami even voiced her own anger over the decision to kill the character. Hope Campbell commented on the manner in which Will died at Ben's hands: "Will was an integral part of the show, and we watched him die in a horrific manner from his own point of view." Campbell praised the production of the scenes and said "seeing the screen fade to black as Will faded with his last breath sent chills up our spines and not something we remember seeing often on a soap." However, she described the situation as "over-the-top" and said the manner in which Ben transported the corpse "added another layer of creepiness we were not looking for."

Despite the controversy that stemmed from Will's murder, Wilson received critical acclaim for his portrayal of Ben. Michael Fairman who praised the story as a "deeply affection and riveting arc" said "Wilson owned every second of Ben's troubled inner life and turmoil." Soap Opera Digest made the climax it's "Editor's Choice" and praised Wilson and his co-stars for making the "stakes feel higher" and "infusing the action with blistering intensity." The magazine said "Wilson was mesmerizing as his character slipped in and out of lucidity. Wilson expertly highlighted Ben's struggle to stay cognizant as the manic part of his personality threatened complete dominance." On-Air On-Soaps deemed the plot twist as the "Most Shocking Storyline" for the year 2015. The website also praised Ben as the "Most Revived Character" and Wilson as one of the "Best" supporting actors. Soap Opera Digest further praised the character's "revitalization" describing Ben as a "ho-hum character whose appeal increased as Wilson plumbed the depths of his alter ego's insanity." Hope Campbell of Soap Hub noted that some fans suspected Ben had been faking his break from reality.

Wilson's omission from the Daytime Emmy pre-nominations invoked a strong outcry from fans on social media. On-Air On-Soaps said Wilson's omission from the nominees was one of the more noticeable ones. Fame10 included Wilson on its 2016 list of "Most Shocking Soap Opera Emmy Snubs." Dorathy Gass declared Wilson's omission was "sheer craziness!" She hoped Wilson would get the well-deserved the Supporting Actor nomination in 2017. Hollie Deese of Soaps.com said Wilson's exclusion was a "glaring oversight" because "I think he took it all this year, hands down." Deese hailed Wilson as one of the "top young actors in the genre."

=== Return stints ===
Hope Campbell of Soap Hub said Wilson's 2016 return would surely "shake things up" just in time for February Sweeps. Michael Fairman praised Wilson for his "incredibly twisted" portrayal during Ben's final confrontation with Kate Mansi's Abigail in April 2015. Michael Goldberg from Serial Scoop said the scenes were "magnificent." Despite Ben terrorizing Abigail, "to many fans, Ben was a treat." Hope Campbell said Wilson's performance kept viewers "enthralled" during his return. In a sample poll of nearly 2,000 votes, 65% of viewers hoped the character would return. A Gold Derby poll saw 56% of voters were excited for Ben's return.

When Wilson reprised his role in 2017, Ryan White-Nobles excitedly declared "The sexiest serial killer in soap history is returning to Days of our Lives!" "If Will is returning to Salem, it should only make sense that the man who 'killed' him does, too, right?" Michael Fairman described the December 2017 scenes in which Ben attempts to re-enact Will's murder, as "riveting" "can't-miss soap opera!" He said the scenes were "portrayed masterfully" by Wilson and his co-stars, Alison Sweeney and Chandler Massey. The three "all played their beats to perfection in this very dark and twisted plotpoint." On-Air On-Soaps said Wilson had the "Best Performance by a recurring" actor for the year 2017. Fairman said "Wilson has taken this disturbed character and brought him to soap opera cult status." Gold Derby and Soap Hub credited Ben's 2017 return with helping the show win its 4th Emmy for Outstanding Drama Series as one of the episodes submitted featured Wilson's reappearance as Ben.

=== Reintroduction (2018) ===
Two Scoops Commentary

I'd be hard pressed to think of an actor who grew as quickly and as far as he did during Ben's brief time on the show. He's easily part of my top ten villain performances of all time on DAYS. So, I'm never opposed to seeing him on my screen again.

— Laurisa, Soapcentral.com

Diane Brounstein of Soap Hub described Ben's 2018 reintroduction as a "smart move." She continued, "While the move may seem like a hard one to pull off […] there's no denying that the actor is mesmerizing to watch." On-Air On-Soaps said "You can never get enough of ole’ Ben Weston in your life now can you?" Michael Fairman said "it will be intriguiging to see just how Ben is integrated back into the canvas" with Ron Carlivati as head writer. Kambra Clifford of Soapcentral.com described the announcement as "killer news." Canyon News said the storyline would cause "fireworks galore." Soap Opera Spy said "Even though Ben has caused quite a lot of trouble in Salem, there’s no denying that fans still tune in to see him." However, not everyone was excited about the character's reintroduction. Jack Ori of TV Fanatic said "I know a lot of people are fans of Batty Ben, but I'm not one of them. … I don't see him as redeemable." Ori continued that "The idea of Ben being so easily redeemed irks me." Ori said the "rushed nature" of Ben's return was "annoying." Christine Orlando said that while she appreciated Wilson's portrayal, "I'm not really sure what purpose it serves to bring Ben back to Salem." While she was excited for the return, Laurisa of Soapcentral.com said "My biggest issue with reformed Ben is that [Robert Scott Wilson] does such a superb job of playing the villain. I'm not so sure I want to see him do anything else." Soap Opera Digest described the character's reintroduction as "misguided" and said "The idea of [Ben] mingling with the loved ones of his victims is off-putting." While the magazine agreed that keeping "Ben on canvas a villain" could generate "interesting" plots, "trying to transform him into a romantic leading man is a big stretch."
