= Drew Donovan =

- Days of our Lives character
- Portrayed by: Charles Shaughnessy
- Duration: 1988, 2017, 2021
- First appearance: September 8, 1988
- Last appearance: September 10, 2021
- Created by: Leah Laiman
- Introduced by: Ken Corday and Al Rabin
- Spin-off appearances: Days of Our Lives: Beyond Salem (2021)
In-universe information
- Other names: Andrew Donovan III; Iago
- Occupation: ISA Agent; Hitman
- Parents: Andrew Donovan II; Margaret Donovan
- Brothers: Shane Donovan
- Spouse: Camilla Donovan (until 2021)
- Nephews: Andrew Donovan
- Nieces: Eve Donovan; Theresa Donovan
- Other relatives: Tate Black; Paige Larson

Andrew "Drew" Donovan III is a fictional character from the American soap opera Days of Our Lives, portrayed by Charles Shaughnessy in 1988-1989. Shaunghnessy reprised his role in February 2017 and again in September 2021 in spin-off Days of Our Lives: Beyond Salem.

== Storylines ==
=== 1988-1989 ===
Drew Donovan is first seen in 1988 kidnapping Roman Brady's daughter, Carrie Brady. He's an assassin working for Stefano DiMera. He is nicknamed Iago and is an assassin that works for Stefano DiMera. He eventually kills Ellen Hawk, Stefano's wife and mother of Benjy Hawk. During his time in Salem, Drew dates Calliope Jones, bonds with his sister-in-law, Kimberly Brady, and meets his niece, Eve Donovan.

He, along with Roman Brady (later revealed to be John Black) and Jeremiah Brown were all trained in the Orient (a secret place that Stefano owned in Thailand) by the Kung-Fu master Orion Hawk. He kills Ambassador Chung by blowing up the whole building, and Benjy goes deaf after being in the building.

Drew reveals his true allegiance eventually, and Shane and Kim become Stefano's prisoners. Drew later has a change of heart and helps Shane and Kim escape Stefano's island. He is shot and wounded in the process. Drew survives and leaves Salem in January 1989.

=== 2017 ===
On February 2, 2017, Jennifer finds Drew locked in a crate. He had been kidnapped by Deimos Kiriakis because he is the inventor of the Orwell device that the DiMera, Kiriakis, and Hernandez families were fighting over.

In the time Drew was away from Salem, he also married a woman named Camila. She helps him see the dangers of Orwell, so he shuts down the project. André DiMera steals the device, and Deimos threatens Camila to force Drew into agreeing to be smuggled into Salem, since Drew is wanted by the ISA for developing Orwell. Drew develops a virus that would destroy the Orwell but has trouble getting it past the TITAN firewall. He also has Jennifer make contact with Camila, who assured Drew that she is safe and has found a safe place to hide. After hearing that Chad DiMera, Sonny Kiriakis, and Gabi Hernandez had been kidnapped, Drew goes to the Kiriakis mansion to put an end to the war once and for all. He phones Shane and asks him to tell Roman to kidnap Deimos if anything happens to him. Drew shows up at the Kiriakis mansion where Jennifer, Andre, and Eduardo Hernandez are. Deimos hands Drew the Orwell device, while gloating to Eduardo and André about his victory. Drew implants the virus that destroyed the Orwell data, rendering the device useless. Roman shows up because Shane had told him what Drew told him. Witness protection is set up for Drew and Camila, so Drew bids farewell to Salem.
