= Zach Tinker =

American actor (born 1994)

- Born: Zachary Atticus Tinker; May 8, 1994 (age 32); New York City, New York, U.S.
- Education: Loyola Marymount University
- Occupation: Actor
- Years active: 2015–present
- Father: John Tinker
- Relatives: Grant Tinker (grandfather); Mark Tinker (uncle)

Zachary Atticus Tinker (born May 8, 1994) is an American actor. He is best known for his role as Fenmore Baldwin in the CBS Daytime soap opera The Young and the Restless. In 2019, Tinker was nominated for a Daytime Emmy Award for his portrayal as the character. Tinker has also appeared in Law & Order True Crime, American Horror Story, NCIS: Los Angeles and Why Women Kill. In 2021, Tinker was cast as Sonny Kiriakis in the television miniseries Days of Our Lives: Beyond Salem, a spinoff of the long-running NBC soap Days of Our Lives. In 2022, Tinker stepped into the role on the main series.

== Early life and education ==
Though Tinker was born in New York, he relocated to Los Angeles when he was three years old. He is the son of television producer and writer John Tinker and Lori Mozilo. Lori is an executive at Disney and is of Italian ancestry. Tinker's parents are divorced. Through his father, Tinker is the grandson of television executive Grant Tinker and the nephew of producer and director Mark Tinker. Tinker began acting as a child in elementary school.

He also had aspirations of going to the NBA until he stopped growing when he was a teenager. He started his college career at Gonzaga University. Like his father, and brother, Tinker planned to become a writer. However, after he participated in a theater production of Stephen Belber's Tape, Tinker realized he wanted to a career as an actor. Up until that point, acting was just a hobby. He then transferred to Loyola Marymount University in his Junior year as a theater major. In 2019, Tinker jokingly described himself as the "black sheep" of his family for becoming an actor. However, despite his father's initial reservations, Tinker said his family has been supportive.

== Career ==
Tinker booked his first major television role in 2015 when he appeared in an episode of TNT's Murder in the First. In 2016, he appeared in an episode of My Crazy Ex and the film Dear Diary, I Died. In 2017, Tinker appeared in Law & Order True Crime, a dramatic retelling of the murder trial of Lyle and Erik Menendez. In 2018, Tinker would go on to appear in episodes of CBS's NCIS and the Facebook Watch series, Turnt. In November 2018, it was announced that he had joined the cast of The Young and the Restless as a recast of Fenmore as the previous actor, Max Ehrich, was unable to reprise the role. The character was written out in early 2019. That year, Tinker would also in an episode of You're the Worst. In the summer of 2019, Tinker was cast as Sam in American Horror Story: 1984, the ninth season of the horror anthology series. In November 2019, it was announced that he would reprise the role Fen in December 2019.

Tinker's Fenmore was written out again in early 2020. Throughout 2020, Tinker would appear in episodes of ABC's Station 19, Netflix's 13 Reasons Why, and L.A.'s Finest. In August 2021, Tinker joined the cast of the Days of Our Lives spinoff miniseries Beyond Salem as a recast of Sonny Kiriakis, a role originated by Freddie Smith. The series would stream on Peacock exclusively. Tinker would reprise the role in the holiday movie Days of Our Lives: A Very Salem Christmas. On February 11, 2022, Days of Our Lives announced that Tinker was slated to step into the role of Sonny on the main show. Tinker made his debut on Days of Our Lives on March 10, 2022 as a series regular. Tinker last appeared as a series regular on December 27, 2022. In January 2023, Tinker briefly reprised the role of Fenmore Baldwin on The Young and the Restless. On January 27, 2023, it was announced that Tinker had joined the cast of Fire Country.

== Personal life ==
In 2019, Tinker was romantically linked with his The Young and the Restless co-star Cait Fairbanks. The duo officially confirmed that they were dating in early 2020. They broke up in 2021.

== Filmography ==
=== Film ===
Year	Title	Role	Notes
2016	Dear Diary, I Died	Christian	
2019	Payment Received	Eric	
2021	Days of Our Lives: A Very Salem Christmas	Sonny Kiriakis	Peacock film
2023	Laced	Austin	
2023	Payment Received	Eric	
2023	For When You Get Lost	Matt	
2025	Beneath the Light	Jacob	

=== Television ===
Year	Title	Role	Notes
2015	Murder in the First	Spether	Episode: "Twenty-Fifteen"
2016	My Crazy Ex	Travis	Episode: "Seething, Thieving & Teething"
2017	Small Shots	Drunkard	Episode: "Fast Break"
2017	Law & Order True Crime	Craig Cignarelli	Recurring role; 3 episodes: "The Menendez Murders: Episode 1", "Episode 2" and "Episode 5"
2018	NCIS	David West	Episode: "Boom"
2018	Turnt	Hot Jock	Episode: "Lonely Together"
2018–2020, 2023	The Young and the Restless	Fenmore Baldwin	Recurring role: 20 episodes December 3, 2018 to February 11, 2019; December 27, 2019 to January 24, 2020
2019	You're the Worst	Curtis	Episode: "Four Goddamn More Days"
2019	Flat Dad	Enzo	Television film
2019	American Horror Story	Sam	Episodes: "Mr. Jingles" and "True Killers"
2019	Two Turtle Doves	Alex Taylor	Television film
2020	Station 19	Greg	Episode: "Born to Run"
2020	13 Reasons Why	Grayson	Episode: "College Tour"
2020	L.A.'s Finest	Joe Killinger	Episode: "Rafferty and the Gold Dust Twins"
2020–2024	Alvinnn!!! and the Chipmunks	Hat Kid / The Time Traveler / Thornbagof	4 episodes
2021	NCIS: Los Angeles	Tyler	Episodes: "A Fait Accompli" and "The Frogman's Daughter"
2021	Why Women Kill	Patrolman Ford	Episodes: "Murder, My Sweet" and "Scene of the Crime"
2021	Days of Our Lives: Beyond Salem	Sonny Kiriakis	Miniseries; 5 episodes
2022	Big Sky	Mark Woodman	5 episodes
2022–2023	Days of Our Lives	Sonny Kiriakis	Series regular
2022–2023	Puppy Dog Pals	Grace's Dad	4 episodes
2023	CSI: Vegas	Warren Bart	Episode: "Eyeballs"
2023	Fire Country	Collin O'Reilly	5 episodes
2023	Beyond Belief: Fact or Fiction	Henry	1 episode
2024	9-1-1	Officer Matthew Sparks	Episode: "Hotshots"
2025	Robogobo	Bob Beaks	3 episodes
2025	Good American Family	Young Michael Barnett	1 episode
2026	9-1-1	Matthew Sparks, DPW	3 Episodes

== Awards and nominations ==
Year	Award	Category	Work	Result	Ref.
2019	Daytime Emmy Award	Outstanding Younger Actor in a Drama Series	The Young and the Restless	Nominated	
