= Sonny Kiriakis =

- Days of Our Lives character
- Zach Tinker as Sonny Kiriakis
- Portrayed by: Freddie Smith (2011–2020); Zach Tinker (2021–present)
- Duration: 2011–present
- First appearance: June 23, 2011
- Created by: Dena Higley (Note: The announcement of Justin and Adrienne's child was shown in 1991, under executive producers Ken Corday and Al Rabin, and head writer Gene Palumbo. The character was later developed and introduced under executive producers Corday and Gary Tomlin, and head writer Dena Higley.)
- Introduced by: Ken Corday and Gary Tomlin (2011); Ken Corday, Albert Alarr and Greg Meng (2015); Ken Corday and Albert Alarr (2021)
- Spin-off appearances: Days of Our Lives: Beyond Salem (2021); Days of Our Lives: A Very Salem Christmas (2021)
In-universe information
- Other names: Jackson Steven Kiriakis
- Occupation: Entrepreneur; Legal aid CEO
- Parents: Justin Kiriakis; Adrienne Johnson Kiriakis
- Brothers: Joey Kiriakis (adoptive); Victor Kiriakis II (adoptive)
- Half-brothers: Alexander Kiriakis II
- Husband: Will Horton (2014–2018, 2019–present); Leo Stark (2018–2019)
- Stepdaughters: Arianna Horton
- Grandparents: Alexander Kiriakis; Christina Kiriakis; Duke Johnson; Jo Johnson
- Uncles: Steve Johnson; Jack Deveraux
- Nieces: Kelsey Wesley
- First cousins: Gwen Rizczech; Abigail Deveraux; Stephanie Johnson; JJ Deveraux; Tripp Dalton; Joey Johnson
- Other relatives: Victor Kiriakis; Xander Kiriakis; Brady Black; Philip Kiriakis

Sonny Kiriakis is a fictional character from Days of Our Lives, an American soap opera on Peacock. The role was originally portrayed by Freddie Smith. Sonny is the only biological child of Justin Kiriakis (Wally Kurth) and Adrienne Johnson Kiriakis (Judi Evans). Sonny's birth was announced in 1991. Developed under head writer Dena Higley, Sonny was introduced in 2011 by executive producers Ken Corday and Gary Tomlin as Justin and Adrienne's openly gay son – the show's first regular character to be openly gay. His major stories included a gay bashing storyline and the development of his romance with Will Horton (Chandler Massey) who is just coming to terms with his own sexuality. In 2014, Will (then portrayed by Guy Wilson) and Sonny marry, becoming the first male-male couple to legally marry in the history of American daytime television drama. Sonny is also known for his friendship and business dealings with Chad DiMera (Casey Deidrick, later Billy Flynn) – a friendship that nearly gets him killed when their sports website is taken over by an illegal gambling operation.

In 2014, the series introduced Sonny's closeted first love, the famous baseball player, Paul Narita (Christopher Sean) and a romantic triangle develops between Sonny, Paul, and Will (who also falls for Paul). The character of Sonny was momentarily written out of the show by his relocation to Paris in August 2015. Smith later briefly reappeared as Sonny in October 2015, before returning again as a regular in July 2016. In February 2020, the characters of Will and Sonny were written out of the series, with Smith's last appearance as Sonny airing in September 2020. A year later, in September 2021, the role of Sonny was recast with Zach Tinker, who took over for the Days of Our Lives: Beyond Salem one week limited series after Smith turned down the offer. Tinker would start appearing on the main series in March 2022; he exited in March of the following year, and returned in August 2023 and July 2024 in a guest capacity.

Sonny is one half of the show's first same-sex super couple, with Will Horton. The couple is commonly referred to by the portmanteaus "WilSon". Smith won the Daytime Emmy Award for Outstanding Younger Actor in a Drama Series in 2015, and earned a nomination for the same award in 2013.

Sonny's arrival on Days of Our Lives in 2011 began an era of storylines featuring gay characters in prominent roles on Days, and in 2012, the show won the GLAAD Media Award for Outstanding Daily Drama, followed by successive wins in 2013, 2014, and 2015.

== Storylines ==
Jackson Steven Kiriakis, known as Sonny, was born on August 7, 1991, in Texas as the only biological child of Justin and Adrienne Kiriakis. In 2007, Justin and Adrienne (off-screen) move Sonny and their three others sons—Alex, Joey and Victor—back to Salem where he enrolls in Salem High School. However, by January 2008, the family relocated again to Dubai. Justin returned to Salem in 2009, with Adrienne returning the following year.

Sonny returns to Salem in the summer of 2011 and immediately decides to live as openly gay in Salem. Sonny comes out to his extended family, including his great uncle Victor (John Aniston). While Victor is supportive of his nephew, he is worried about how others will react. Sonny settles into his life getting a job an internship as a legal aid for the district attorney, reconnects with his family and develops fast friendships with Will Horton (Chandler Massey), Chad DiMera (Casey Deidrick) and Gabi Hernandez (Camila Banus), who accept him despite their friend T's (Brendan Coughlin) homophobic disapproval. Sonny later partners up with Chad and Will to launch a website for sports fans at Salem University. However, they are forced to shut the website down when criminals begin using it for illegal gambling. The criminals kidnap Gabi, Chad, Melanie Jonas (Molly Burnett) and Sonny's cousin Abigail Deveraux (Kate Mansi) forcing Sonny, Will and Austin Reed (Patrick Muldoon) to come to their rescue. Sonny and Chad embark on another business venture when they open Common Grounds coffee shop together. Sonny wants the shop to be a place where people from all walks of life can feel accepted. When Will chooses not to be involved, Sonny suspects he is keeping his distance because he is questioning his sexuality. Trying to be supportive, Sonny often invites Will to hang out with him and his friends. When Will confides in Sonny about his feelings in the summer of 2012, Sonny realizes he has fallen for him and kisses him, only for Will to reject him. T accuses Sonny of making Will gay and physically assaults him. Sonny is comforted by his friends and family, and Victor even threatens T. Sonny and Will begin dating when Will officially comes out only for Will's father Lucas (Bryan Dattilo) to disapprove. However, once Sonny makes it clear that he definitely loves Will, Lucas becomes more accepting. With their relationship going so well, Sonny agrees to lend Will some money.

Meanwhile, Sonny notices tension between Chad and the pregnant Gabi, but Chad refuses to give him an explanation. In January 2013, as Gabi is set to marry Will's cousin Nick Fallon (Blake Berris), Chad interrupts the wedding by announcing Nick is not the father of her baby, forcing Will—the best man—to reveal himself as the father. A devastated Sonny demands answers from Chad, who reveals that Gabi was behind the scheme to kidnap his then girlfriend Melanie—but he did not know Will was her baby's father. Sonny reconciles with Will but is very wary of trusting Gabi and Nick. Sonny's suspicions prove true when Nick blackmails Will into signing away his parental rights in exchange for Nick keeping quiet about Will shooting EJ DiMera (James Scott) in 2007. Nick and Sonny later get into a fight, forcing Will to go to his mother Sami Brady (Alison Sweeney) for help. Sonny supports Will and Sami's plans to ingratiate themselves to crime lord Stefano DiMera (Joseph Mascolo) in hopes that he will destroy the evidence against Will. Meanwhile, Sonny and Sami steal Nick's copies of the recordings of Will's confession. In May 2013, Sonny and Will follow Nick and Gabi, who are being held at gun point by an armed gunman. They rescue Gabi, and Will stays behind to rescue Nick. However, Gabi goes into labor, and Sonny helps her deliver her daughter, Arianna Horton, in an abandoned shack. Sonny is distraught when Will gets shot trying to rescue Nick, but, fortunately, he pulls through. After Gabi splits with Nick, Sonny convinces her to move in with them so they can raise Arianna together. Later, Sonny and Will are furious to learn that Gabi is seeing Nick again. Gabi threatens to move out with Arianna if they don't back off. They are relieved when Gabi soon breaks up with Nick on her own. After Nick mysteriously disappears, claiming to have left town—Will realizes Sami, Gabi and his grandmother Kate Roberts (Lauren Koslow) are hiding something and Will assumes they are planning a surprise birthday party for him. Sonny listens in on one of their conversations at Will's request only to learn that the three women are covering up Nick's apparent murder having disposed of his body in the river. The three women convince Sonny to keep quiet, insisting that Gabi killed Nick in self-defense. After he convinces Will to keep quiet, Sonny begins having nightmares about Nick.

They are all shocked when Nick crashes Arianna's christening in January 2014, appearing to have amnesia. While everyone, including Sonny, remained suspicious of Nick, Gabi falls back into old habits, and Sonny warns her away from him. Meanwhile, Sonny proposes to Will (Guy Wilson) and he rejects him saying he wants to wait for the situation with Nick to be resolved. However, thanks to his grandmother Marlena Evans (Deidre Hall) — Will officially accept Sonny's proposal on Valentine's Day. The duo were married by Marlena on April 3, 2014, at Victor's mansion in front of their family and friends. As the newlyweds settle into their life, Sonny and Gabi butt heads over her reconciliation with Nick. While he put on a facade for Gabi, Nick shows his true colors with everyone else threatening to send Gabi, Kate, and Sami to jail for his attempted murder. Sonny goes so far as to steal a gun from Victor's house and keep it for protection, and Will urges him to return the gun only for Nick to be shot to death the following day. Will confesses to the crime fearing Sonny is responsible, but Sonny quickly reveals he is innocent. Gabi later confesses to killing Nick after overhearing his threats to Sonny. With Gabi in prison, Sonny and Will promise to stay in touch with her. As they start their new life, Sonny appeals to Victor, who pulls some strings to get Will hired at True Vista magazine. Sonny is wary when Will's first article focuses on his mother Sami's attempt to destroy her husband EJ because he has cheated on her. Sonny tries to get him to drop the article, but Will refuses. Sonny is furious when the article hits the press, identifying Abigail as EJ's mistress. It is revealed that Sami leaked Abby's identity to the editor. Meanwhile, Chad (Billy Flynn) returns to Salem, and Sonny resents him for abandoning their club. Sonny buys out Chad, allowing him a larger share of the profits, and Chad also agrees to finance a second location for a new club. After EJ's murder, Sonny reluctantly gives Will his blessing to accompany the grieving Sami to Hollywood, where he will work on the screenplay about Sami's life for a film. Tied up n his work, Will neglects Sonny, who struggles to build the new club. He is forced to clear out his and Will's joint savings account to finance the club. Meanwhile, Sonny is reunited with his ex-boyfriend, world-famous baseball player, Paul Narita (Christopher Sean). The closeted Paul wants to reunite with Sonny, who quickly reveals he is married. Will and Ari return just in time for Christmas, and he starts work on a top secret article for SONIX magazine.

Just before the article's release, Derrick (Spencer Neville), a customer at Sonny's club, inadvertently reveals to Sonny that Will and Paul are having an affair. A furious Sonny goes to confront Will only to be stabbed and left for dead by one of Victor's enemies. Victor and his wife Maggie Horton (Suzanne Rogers) discover Sonny and rush him to the hospital where he undergoes emergency surgery. Sonny initially wakes up with amnesia from the trauma, but as his memories of the attack return—so does his anger toward Will. Sonny is shocked when he receives a visit from Paul and forces him to confirm the affair and throws him out. Sonny then confronts a defensive Will who confesses that he believes Sonny only married him because Paul had rejected him. Upset, Sonny decides separation is best and goes to Arizona to visit his brother Alex. Sonny later goes to Paris to work for Victor, managing clubs and casinos. In October 2015, Sonny is devastated to learn Will has been murdered and he returns home to attend the funeral. Sonny leaves town again, unable to shake the memories of Will and returns to Paris. In July 2016, Sonny moved back to Salem and, within time, rekindled his relationship with Paul. In 2017, Sonny is named CEO of Titan Industries and also becomes engaged to Paul. Soon after, it is discovered that Will (now Chandler Massey) is alive with amnesia and has been living in Memphis with Susan Banks. Sonny ends his relationship with Paul, realizing his love for Will is greater. In August 2018, Will regains his memories and reciprocates his feelings for Sonny. In December 2018, Sonny is blackmailed into marrying Leo Stark, who threatened to turn Sonny and Will in to the police for almost murdering him previously (albeit accidentally) if Sonny did not oblige; the marriage is later annulled. In June 2019, Sonny and Will remarried for the second time.

== Development ==
=== Casting and creation ===
Freddie Smith on Sonny

There's been a lot of controversy about this and for me to be able to [be] a part of it, to be able to change people and make a difference… I'm really excited to play a character with that much pull.

— Lynette Rice, Entertainment Weekly

In May 2011 rumors circulated that Freddie Smith—known for his recent portrayal of Marco Salazar, a gay character from The CW's Teen drama 90210—was slated to join the cast of Days of Our Lives in a new gay role. On June 17, 2011, Entertainment Weekly confirmed exclusively that Smith had been cast in the role of Sonny, an openly gay character—connected to a previously established family. Sonny was reported at the time to be Days first openly gay character, but in fact Sonny is the second, following Ryan Scott's openly gay Harold Wentworth who featured in the show from 2001 to 2003. Smith talked about his new role, saying: "I'm very excited to portray him"; and "I love that I can do a role like this, stand up and speak out on what I believe in. I want to show that it's okay". Smith relished in playing a role "that makes a difference" and said it "makes my job that much better – and to be a part of history; I'll go down in the history books, I mean it's great!" Smith originally auditioned with Days in March 2011 for a different character—a high school quarterback. After several meetings with the director of casting, Marnie Saitta, Smith learned that he would instead be playing a gay character. Thanks to his experience on 90210, Smith had very little reservations about playing the role of Sonny. Smith screen-tested opposite Judi Evans who would play his mother, Adrienne. "I had an inkling I would get [the role] because Judi and I clicked so well" Smith said of his audition. Smith believed he got the role of Sonny because he can relate to him so easily. Despite being straight in real life, Smith said "When I read the scripts, I just get it instantly." He revealed that the casting department was quite impressed by his audition. In his portrayal, Smith said "I do as much work on the character as I can to make it as real as possible and to tell a good story." To prepare for the role, Smith did a lot of research and also went to his own gay friends for advice. "I started reading through people's personal stories and these feelings, and it brings me that much closer to the LGBT community."

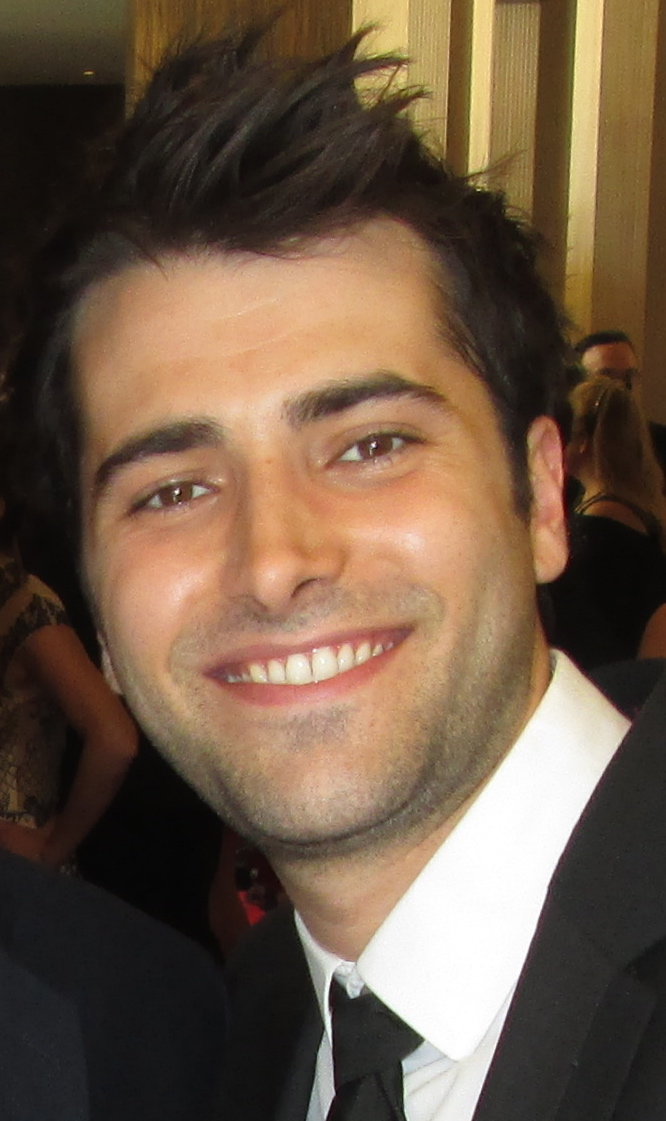
Freddie Smith was cast as Sonny in 2011; he remained in the role through 2020.

Entertainment Weekly first reported on the plans the for usually conservative Days of Our Lives to introduce its first character in March 2011. Co-executive producer Greg Meng gave an interview to Frontiers magazine where he discussed how Sonny came about. "This has been discussed for a long time with a lot of thought. And yes, there were concerns, but it's like, 'Wow. Who are we? What are we thinking? It is time!' We didn’t want to do some gay love story, or just go off on some extreme ripped-from-the-headlines political story, just to be telling a ‘gay story.’ We are looking at a long-term, longtime beloved characters type of situation for Sonny. It is about a character who is now on the show, and who by the way, is gay!" As Sonny hit airwaves, there were rumors of some opposition from certain affiliates who had threatened to stop airing the series if the story continued. Despite the potential push back, Meng said that executives across the board, from both NBC and Sony were in support of the story. Smith explained that the producers "really did not want to go in a stereotypical" direction with the story. "They wanted to show different aspects of the story and that went into the casting of Sonny."

=== Characterization ===
Freddie Smith described Sonny as "the center of attention kind of guy in a good way." He continued, Sonny is "very confident and mature." Sonny is very "open-minded." According to Smith, when Sonny makes mistakes, he learns from them. Smith described Sonny as "so colorful and three-dimensional. He's such an interesting character." Greg Meng said the character was envisioned as "the guy next door, but yet has strength, vulnerability and charm." Meng also said "the plan is for Sonny to be very responsible." According to Smith, "Sonny is a positive character" usually.

=== Introduction (2011) ===
Smith on Sonny's introduction

When I first came on the show and was being interviewed, it was all about being the first gay character. A year and half later people are like, “So Sonny is doing so and so in his life.” He just became Sonny, not labeled just the first gay character. I think it was great that they came to know Sonny for Sonny. I think fans that waited will be very happy that they waited and hung in there with us. Now, Sonny is going to take Salem by storm and people can start to invest and enjoy in his storylines.

— Michael Fairman, On-Air On-Soaps

What sets Sonny's introduction apart from the introductions of other gay characters is "that he was comfortable, and out, and even his family was accepting of him" Smith said. He continued, "They just wanted to show that when you come out and you are with the people you trust and love—you can finally get out from under that rock, and just be who you are." The openly gay Sonny slowly eases into canvas as he develops relationships with those he comes in contact with. Unlike most character introductions, Sonny is not immediately thrust into a romance. Already four months into his tenure, Smith insisted that he "legitimately" did not know who his love interest would be but he was excited because it was all people were talking about. Smith added that giving Sonny a love interest would make him much more "dimensional" as a character. "Everyone on the show has a boy or a girl, and I am like the fifth wheel" he joked. However, Smith came to appreciate the waiting period. "It was important for people to get to know Sonny as a person and not just as this gay character on the show, who is dating another gay character." One consistent theme with Sonny is that he is very open about his sexuality. While his parents are worried about how others will react—particularly Sonny's great uncle Victor Kiriakis (John Aniston) -- "Sonny is very comfortable. He'll tell anyone" Smith said. Smith explained that Sonny "just wants his friends and family to accept him for who he is." Victor's support is something Sonny never questions because of how close they are. While said it would have been cool to do a coming-out story with Sonny he appreciated how comfortable Sonny is with being openly gay because "It showed that it's great to have a support system. It made it easier for him to come out." Not only does Sonny's introduction make him the only representation of a gay character on daytime television at the time as All My Children's iconic lesbian character, Bianca Montgomery (Eden Riegel) made her final appearances when the soap went off the air in September 2011, he was also the first "official" gay character in Days of Our Lives's 47-year history.

=== Gay bashing (2012) ===
Upon his arrival in 2011, Sonny's life seemed very easy going and Freddie Smith hinted that "At some point, there will be conflict in Sonny's story." Meanwhile, his uncle Victor's only concern is how other people will react to his nephew. In the summer of 2012 during an interview with Outlook Media Smith revealed that Sonny would be involved in a bullying storyline. Smith previewed the storyline during and interview and said "it's told very well, and I think it's important to show storylines like that because it happens in real life all the time." He insisted the importance of showing "how [bullying] affects people." When Brendan Coughlin reprises his recurring role as Tad "T" Stevens in the summer of 2012—T and Sonny are already at odds. "He did not like Sonny because he is gay, he is a gay basher" Smith said of T. So when T returns to town and finds out his best friend Will Horton (Chandler Massey) has recently come out of the closet—T blames Sonny for it." Sonny has already experienced this before and the incident with T "brings him back -- he thought he was home free. [It's] disappointing to him. He was very bullet proof at first." Smith explained that Sonny already "came to terms with who he is, and he thought all of this was in his past." The ordeal kind of shocks him. Smith admitted to having his own experience being bullied but described it as "very mild." However, he knew of others that had worse experiences and thought it was a good reason that the plot address the "huge issue." For about two weeks, the series shows the emotional effects of the bullying from Sonny's point of view and how he works through those emotions. One particular scene shows Sonny being comforted by his father, Justin (Wally Kurth). "It turned out to be such a great scene" Smith remarked. He continued, "It's important to have family there under circumstances like that." The storyline culminated with Sonny retaliating against his attacker Tad "T" Stevens (Brendan Coughlin). "I personally wouldn't go after someone like that" Smith said but he defended Sonny's actions by saying "our emotions run wild and we don't always think. We just react." Smith praised his costar Brendan Coughlin for his portrayal of T. "I just react off of him. He really scares me and makes me feel like crap." The storyline also afforded Smith with the opportunity to speak to congress about an anti-bullying campaign.

=== Departure (2015) ===
Smith's Facebook message

I remember people being unsure how the audience would accept the character. With amazing writing and an incredible vision, "Days of Our Lives" and the creative team told a raw, uncut, passionate love story between two men who fell in love. Will and Sonny became the POWER COUPLE known as WILSON! We were treated like every other couple on the show and the audience accepted us with open arms. I feel so blessed to have been a part of the equal rights movement over the past 4 years. I will never forget the journey I had as Jackson "Sonny" Kiriakis. Thank you to all my friends, family, and fans for your support and love. I know Sonny will be missed, but I hear Salem always has their door open!

— Freddie Smith, Facebook

On April 3, 2015, Michael Goldberg of Serial Scoop reported that Smith would be leaving the series. However, neither the network or the show runners were available to comment at press time. Daytime Confidential's Jamey Giddens revealed that he had contacted the show's publicist but had yet to receive a response. Soap Opera Digest reported that Smith had decided to leave the series on his own accord. Smith who finished taping scenes in March 2015 confirmed his exit to Soap Opera Digest in May 2015 and revealed that the door was left open for his character to return. He revealed that he wanted to pursue other endeavors such as producing and directing. Not even his Daytime Emmy win could make Smith rethink his decision to vacate the role of Sonny. "During the press conference after his win, Smith said "I think it’s a reminder [of DAYS] but it’s also pushing me into the future; letting me spread my wings and move on. It represents a lot of things — the future and the past, if you will." "Working 60 hours a week on DOOL, I had all my focus on the show. In order for me to direct and pursue films, I had to make the tough decision and leave the show." Smith had signed a four-year contract, and "I knew my contract was coming to an end and the big decision had to be made." He continued "as an actor, I wanted to step outside of my comfort zone." Smith met with executive producer Ken Corday and the production team to inform them of his decision. "They even said the door was always open, which is the best compliment I could have received" the actor said of the show's support of him. Smith's final scenes aired on August 18, 2015, and he posted a heartfelt message to fans on his Facebook page. "As Freddie I was genuinely sad, and so was the character" Smith said of his final day on set. "It was very emotional." Smith explained that his desire to try other things contributed to his decision not to sign another contract earlier in the year. "I have a few films that are already in preproduction. They'll go into production very soon." In story, Sonny leaves town to work for his uncle Victor in Europe after his marriage to Will falls apart due to Will's affair with Sonny's boyfriend, Paul Narita (Christopher Sean). Smith appreciated that the character had experienced some pain and drama. "Before the story [with Paul and Will] start, I remember thinking, 'Sonny's so happy. Can he just yell once in a while?'" Smith insisted that Sonny could definitely return.

Only a month after Freddie Smith's final scenes aired, rumors circulated that Guy Wilson's Will Horton was to be killed off in October. Days historian Jason47 reported that Smith would briefly reprise the role of Sonny to help facilitate Wilson's departure. Smith told Soap Opera Digest that he was literally contacted by the series to briefly reprise his role the following week after he finished filming scenes in March 2015. "It was very top secret" he remarked. A month later, he was contacted again about details of his return and informed that Will Horton was being killed off. "It was the last thing I would have imagined." Due to the nature of his swift return, "It felt like I was away for a long weekend." Smith filmed four episodes which started airing on October 12, 2015. He last aired on October 22 as a grief-stricken Sonny leaves town again as it is too painful to remain in Salem. "With Will being gone, I felt like there was a closure" Smith said of his return. In an interview with AfterBuzz TV, Smith revealed that Guy Wilson had contacted him in secret to inform him of the decision to kill of the character and he was officially contacted by the network after. Smith felt the need to explain his prior statements about how he felt "closure" at the end of the story. "The good closure not on the love story, but the closure in the sense that Sonny has to go back to see his husband. If he didn’t go back – it’s terrible that he died – no one wants that – but as the character, you would obviously go back and see your husband. It was just an interesting end to the whole thing."

=== Return (2016) ===
On February 3, 2016, a picture of actor Vincent Irizarry and Judi Evans on set showed a person resembling Freddie Smith working in the background. Though Irizarry claimed that the person was just a stagehand, many immediately speculated that Smith was set to return to the series. Soap Opera Digest officially confirmed the news of Smith's return in April 2016. Michael Fairman of On-Air On-Soaps reported that Smith had been filming new episodes for several months which would begin airing in July 2016. Smith gave a statement to the magazine about his return. "I am beyond excited about returning home to Salem. Sonny is back and it's going to be amazing!" On May 27, 2016, Smith's official fan account on Twitter announced that the actor had signed a new deal with the soap. Soap Opera Digest announced that Sonny's return to the canvas was slated for July 26. Of his return, Smith revealed that he was contacted about reprising the role of Sonny in November 2015, shortly after he last aired and said he was happy to be welcome back to the show. Of his return, Smith said "you're going to see a mature side to Sonny."

=== Second departure (2020) ===
On February 12, 2020, on his podcast, Smith announced that he and Massey had been let go from their roles. Detailing the exit, Smith stated: "Essentially what happened is we came back … so we had that big two-and-a-half month or nine-week break. I was under the impression — I knew this going back, that I was coming back for six episodes and contracts hadn’t been signed yet. I said, 'Great, there are a lot of things going on over there, a lot of things are up in the air. Great I am coming back for six episodes.' We hit people up [via] DM from the show and Chandler and I were trying to figure out if we were the only two coming back for six or are there other people that are just coming back for six. Once we got confirmation that other people were coming back for six, we figured 'Okay, good, we are not getting written off.' As the scripts started coming in, we started talking more. I just go , 'Man, this doesn’t look good. This doesn’t look like we are going to be signed onto a contract.'" Smith made his last regular appearance on September 1, 2020, and then made one final appearance during the Christmas season in December 2020.

=== Beyond Salem, recast, third departure and guest returns (2021–2024) ===
In August 2021, it was announced Zach Tinker had been cast in the role of Sonny for the limited series, Days of Our Lives: Beyond Salem, replacing Smith. The same year, he reprised the role in Days of Our Lives: A Very Salem Christmas. In February 2022, it was announced Tinker would bring Sonny back to the main serial, following the 2022 Winter Olympics break. On his return, Tinker admitted, "I didn't have any preconceived notion that they were going to bring me on. Honestly. I thought that was wishful thinking, and then I got a call that they wanted to put me on the show." In February of the following year, it was announced Tinker would exit the role.

In August 2023, it was announced Ken Corday and Albert Alarr would bring the character back to honor Aniston and the character of Victor. Sonny returned to Days of Our Lives on August 30. In July 2024, he again returned for the dual-wedding of Xander Kiriakis (Paul Telfer)/Sarah Horton (Linsey Godfrey) and Alex Kiriakis (Robert Scott Wilson)/Theresa Donovan (Emily O'Brien).

== Reception ==
Laurisa Mahlin from Soap Central expressed that "Sonny came into town with a bag of awesome slung over his shoulder" and that she adores Justin and Adrienne's kid. Tony from Soap Central also stated, "Sonny has Justin's charm, Adrienne's common sense, and Victor's persuasive streak."

The character of Sonny Kiriakis has been received well with critics and the audience. The Will and Sonny romance has also gained a lot of fan support and critical success, TV Guide has said that "While it took 45 years for the show to introduce its first openly gay character (Sonny) and another year and a half to find him a male partner (Will) the wait was well worth it. This steamy, star-crossed saga has had its drama to spare (paranoia, blackmail, impossible parents!), but its success lies in the fresh easy charm of these young men." TV Source Magazine named Will and Sonny best couple of 2012 in the Days of Our Lives series, saying, "One of the most refreshing things about Will and Sonny's relationship is it's portrayed just as any heterosexual couple. Watching them grow from friends to being in love was one of the highlights of the year for DAYS."

Smith's portrayal of Sonny earned him a nomination for Outstanding Younger Actor in a Drama Series at the 40th Daytime Emmy Awards in 2013. He won that award at the 42nd Daytime Emmy Awards in 2015.

In 2020, Charlie Mason from Soaps She Knows placed Will and Sonny jointly at #24 on a list of the 35 most memorable characters from Days of Our Lives, commenting, "Judge us if you must for making Freddie Smith and Chandler Massey's gay supercouple share an entry. After all that they've been through, we just couldn't bear to separate the harried marrieds again."
