= Days of Our Lives: Beyond Salem =

Limited series streaming soap opera

- Genre: Soap opera
- Based on: Days of Our Lives by Ted Corday; Betty Corday
- Written by: Ron Carlivati
- Country of origin: United States
- Original language: English
- No. of seasons: 2
- No. of episodes: 10

Production
- Executive producer: Ken Corday
- Producer: Randy Dugan
- Running time: 38–50 minutes
- Production companies: Corday Productions; Sony Pictures Television

Original release
- Network: Peacock
- Release: September 6, 2021 – July 15, 2022

Related
- Days of Our Lives

Days of Our Lives: Beyond Salem is an American soap opera limited series. It is a spin-off of the flagship Days of Our Lives television series. It premiered on Peacock on September 6, 2021, with a daily episode through September 10, 2021. Beyond Salem: Chapter 2, a second season of five episodes, premiered on July 11, 2022.

== Premise ==
The series follows the adventures of current and former characters of Days of Our Lives outside of Salem, Illinois.

== Cast ==
=== Main ===
- Deidre Hall as Marlena Evans
- Drake Hogestyn as John Black
- James Reynolds as Abe Carver (season 1)
- Jackée Harry as Paulina Price (season 1)
- Robert Scott Wilson as Ben Weston
- Victoria Konefal as Ciara Brady
- Sal Stowers as Lani Price-Grant (season 1)
- Lamon Archey as Eli Grant (season 1)
- Chandler Massey as Will Horton (season 1)
- Billy Flynn as Chad DiMera (season 1)
- Zach Tinker as Sonny Kiriakis (season 1)
- Thaao Penghlis as Tony DiMera (season 1)
- Leann Hunley as Anna DiMera (season 1)
- Charles Shaughnessy as Shane Donovan / Drew Donovan (season 1)
- Peter Porte as Kyle Graham (season 1)
- Kristian Alfonso as Hope Williams Brady (season 2)
- Peter Reckell as Bo Brady (season 2)
- Steve Burton as Harris Michaels (season 2)
- Mary Beth Evans as Kayla Brady Johnson (season 2)
- Stephen Nichols as Steve Johnson (season 2)
- Christopher Sean as Paul Narita (season 2)
- Colton Little as Andrew Donovan (season 2)
- Camila Banus as Gabi Hernandez (season 2)
- Remington Hoffman as Li Shin (season 2)
- Miranda Wilson as Megan Hathaway (season 2)
- Lucas Adams as Tripp Dalton (season 2)
- Lisa Rinna as Billie Reed (season 1)
- Eileen Davidson as Kristen DiMera (season 1), Thomas Banks (season 2) and Sister Mary Moira Banks (season 2)
- Loretta Devine as Angela (season 2)

=== Supporting ===
- Christie Clark as Carrie Brady Reed (season 1)
- Austin Peck as Austin Reed (season 1)
- Greg Rikaart as Leo Stark (season 1)
- Abigail Klein as Stephanie Johnson (season 2)
- Tanner Stine as Joey Johnson (season 2)
- Victoria Grace as Wendy Shin (season 2)

=== Guest ===
- Jackie Cox as herself (season 1)
- Adrienne Frantz as Sophie Faversham (season 1)
- Scott Bailey as Miles Faversham (season 1)
- Roxy Wood as Cori Blake (season 1)
- Enya Flack as Michelle White (season 1)
- Noah Huntley as Lord Sebastian Alamain (season 1)
- Vince Van Patten as Phil Hellworth (season 2)
- Josh Taylor as Chris Kositchek (season 2)
- Andrew Masset as Judge Welch (season 2)
- Scott Shilstone as Zack Brady (season 2)

== Episodes ==
Season	Episodes	Originally released	
Season	Episodes	First released	Last released
1	5	September 6, 2021	September 10, 2021
2	5	July 11, 2022	July 15, 2022

=== Season 1 (2021) ===
An investigation into some stolen jewels is the focus of this season set in locations such as Phoenix, New Orleans, Miami and Zurich, Switzerland.

Days of Our Lives: Beyond Salem chapter 1 episodes
No. overall	No. in season	Title	Directed by	Written by	Original release date
1	1	"The Alamainian Peacock"	Sonia Blangiardo-Goins	Story by : Jeanne Marie Ford; Teleplay by : Joanna Cohen	September 6, 2021
Shane discusses the missing sapphire from the Alamainian Peacock and convinces John to go undercover to retrieve it. Anna and Tony visit Carrie and Austin who are having marital troubles. Chad visits Sonny and Will, but discovers that Sonny thinks Will is cheating on him. Billie goes undercover, disguised as Princess Gina, to find the missing amethyst, and is met by Ciara and Ben. Paulina shows off her orange diamond ring to Abe, Eli and Lani.
2	2	"This Means War"	Sonia Blangiardo-Goins	Story by : Katherine Schock; Teleplay by : Richard Culliton	September 7, 2021
Paulina's ring with the orange diamond is stolen at gunpoint, but Eli and Lani apprehend one of the gunmen. Anna and Tony get into a bidding war with John and Marlena. Sonny confronts Will about Leo Stark. Billie meets fellow ISA agent Kyle Graham, and Ciara agrees to impersonate Princess Gina's daughter Greta Von Amberg.
3	3	"Cat and Mouse"	Noel Maxam	Story by : Dave Ryan; Teleplay by : Carolyn Culliton	September 8, 2021
Shane delivers an update to Paulina and Abe regarding her stolen ring. John is determined to get the necklace back from Anna. Kristen, disguised as Sister Mary Moira, visits Anna and steals the sapphire. Leo reveals his source. Paulina's ring with the orange diamond is recovered by Lani and Shane.
4	4	"Dressed to Kill"	Albert Alarr	Story by : Ryan Quan; Teleplay by : David Kreizman	September 9, 2021
Billie and Kyle track down Kristen and retrieve the sapphire. Ciara and Ben go undercover as Greta and Austin at a party which turns out to be a sex party. Will, Sonny, and Chad are forced to compete in a drag competition in order to retrieve the emerald. John and Carrie find two of the missing gemstones in Austin's bag.
5	5	"Endgame"	Albert Alarr	Story by : Jamey Giddens; Teleplay by : Richard Culliton	September 10, 2021
The danger the Alamainian Peacock poses is revealed.

=== Season 2 (2022) ===
An investigation into who is trying to unite three magical prisms is the focus of this season set in locations such as Montreal, Seattle, San Francisco, Monte Carlo, Caracas, and Hong Kong.

Days of Our Lives: Beyond Salem chapter 2 episodes
No. overall	No. in season	Title	Directed by	Written by	Original release date
6	1	"Reunion"	Albert Alarr	Story by : Dave Ryan; Teleplay by : David Kreizman	July 11, 2022
Hope gets to meet her new grandson when Ciara and Ben visit her in Montreal, where she's been living for the past two years. Bo watches over Hope from heaven. Kayla and Steve pay an unexpected visit to their children in Seattle. John reunites with his son Paul who's been living in San Francisco. A mysterious man takes Steve and John captive for Megan Hathaway, Stefano DiMera's daughter.
7	2	"Three Prisms"	Sonia Blangiardo-Goins	Story by : Jamey Giddens; Teleplay by : David Kreizman	July 12, 2022
Thomas Banks successfully steals a prism, which he delivers to Megan. Paul and Andrew Donovan team up to find the whereabouts of Steve and John. Megan reveals her plan. Hope introduces Harris to Ciara and Ben. Tripp and Joey discover Wendy Shin in their apartment. Hope accepts Harris' marriage proposal.
8	3	"A Gala and a Wedding"	Angela Tessinari	Story by : Katherine Shock; Teleplay by : Richard Culliton	July 13, 2022
Gabi and Li arrive in Hong Kong for the DiMera gala. Harris and Megan plan their next move. Bo tries to get a meeting with God to help Hope. Paul and Andrew arrive in Hong Kong to track down Harris. Hope reveals her mission to Ben and Ciara. Tripp, Joey, and Wendy get ready for the DiMera gala. Thomas shoots Hope.
9	4	"Extra Life"	Scott McKinsey	Story by : Jeanne Marie Ford; Teleplay by : Carolyn Culliton	July 14, 2022
Megan uses mind control on Steve and John. Bo and Hope are reunited in heaven. Steve and John arrive at the DiMera gala. Harris demands that Ciara and Ben hand over the prism. Marlena and Kayla track down Steve and John at the gala who in turn tie them up. Hope agrees to leave heaven. Events that led up to Hope being shot are reversed. Megan reveals herself.
10	5	"Second Chances"	Noel Maxam	Story by : Ryan Quan; Teleplay by : Kirk Doering	July 15, 2022
Steve and John take possession of the prism at gunpoint. Megan demands the prism from Hope. Paul and Andrew kiss. Kayla and Marlena try to get through to Steve and John. With all the prisms in place, and with his second second chance, Bo is alive.

== Production ==
It was announced in July 2021 that Peacock had ordered a five-episode miniseries spinoff of Days of Our Lives, which would see current and former actors star, including Rinna, Hall and Reynolds, among others. Additional castings, including Davidson and Penghlis, were announced the following month. Filming had commenced by August 2021.

A second chapter of five episodes was announced in April 2022, premiered from July 11 to 15. The casting of Kristian Alfonso and Peter Reckell was announced with it. Steve Burton was later announced to have joined the second chapter in the role of Harris Michaels. On June 2, 2022, it was announced that Davidson, Christopher Sean, Vince Van Patten, and Loretta Devine had also been cast.

== Soundtrack ==
The soundtrack for Beyond Salem: Chapter 2 was released on July 15, 2022.

== Accolades ==
List of accolades
Year	Association	Category	Recipient(s)	Result	Ref.
2022	Daytime Emmy Award	Outstanding Drama Series	Beyond Salem	Nominated	
2022	Daytime Emmy Award	Outstanding Drama Series Writing Team	Beyond Salem	Nominated	
2022	Daytime Emmy Award	Outstanding Drama Series Directing Team	Beyond Salem	Nominated	
2022	Daytime Emmy Award	Outstanding Casting	Marnie Saitta, Bob Lambert	Nominated	
2023	Daytime Emmy Award	Outstanding Guest Performer in a Drama Series	Steve Burton as Harris Michaels	Nominated	
2023	Daytime Emmy Award	Outstanding Drama Series Directing Team	Beyond Salem	Nominated	
2023	Daytime Emmy Award	Outstanding Drama Series Writing Team	Beyond Salem	Nominated	
