= Robert Scott Wilson =

American actor and model

- Born: November 9, 1987 (age 38); Grafton, Massachusetts, U.S.
- Occupations: Actor; model
- Years active: 2009–present
- Modeling information
- Height: 6 ft 0 in (183 cm)
- Hair color: Brown
- Eye color: Brown

Robert Scott Wilson (born November 9, 1987) is an American model and actor. He is recognized for portraying the roles of Ben Weston and Alex Kiriakis on Days of Our Lives.

He is also known for being the first male model of The Price Is Right.

== Early life ==
Wilson grew up outside of Boston, Massachusetts. In 2006, he moved to New York after graduating from Grafton Memorial High School.

== Career ==
Wilson appeared in episodes of the television series The Secret Life of the American Teenager and The Middle. He has guest-starred as Colin Kirk in Supah Ninjas and appeared in episodes of Entourage, Melissa and Joey, Greek, Suite Life On Deck and Make It or Break It. He appeared in music videos for Victoria Justice, Manika, Toni Braxton and David Guetta. He has appeared in the feature films Bride Wars, Surrogates, Friends with Benefits and The Social Network.

In August 2012, The Price Is Right began a search for its first permanent male model, and held an open call for auditions. Wilson emerged as one of three finalists after competing with 25 other candidates. He was then voted by viewers of the show to win the model search in September 2012. Wilson appeared on new episodes through the spring of 2014, and mentored candidates for his replacement in the fall of 2014 in the web series "Male Model Search II".

In 2013, Wilson joined the cast of All My Children for The OnLine Network. His character, Pete Cortlandt, is the youngest son of Opal and Palmer Cortlandt and a 22-year-old Silicon Valley tech wiz.

He stands six feet (1.8 m) tall and has brown hair, hazel eyes, and wears shoe size 11. He also modeled for several brands of underwear. He was formerly signed with Ford Models of Los Angeles. As of January 2014, he was signed with Otto Models and LA Model Management.

In April 2014, Days of Our Lives announced that Wilson had been hired as a recast for the role of Ben, previously portrayed by Justin Gaston. Wilson vacated the role in December 2015. In January 2016, it was announced that Wilson would reprise his role as Ben in March to facilitate the exit of his former co-star Kate Mansi who played Abigail Deveraux. Wilson concluded his run with the series on June 24, 2016. In July 2017, Wilson was cast in the Rob Malenfant-directed thriller, The Girl Who Cried Wolf. Wilson once again returned to Days of Our Lives in September 2017 to help facilitate the return of Chandler Massey's Will Horton. In November 2017, Wilson was cast in the Jared Cohn-directed independent film Relic opposite William Shatner. In late 2017, it was announced that he was cast as Ethan Wyatt, a regular on season 2 of Amazon's show Ladies of the Lake.

On July 8, 2022, Wilson exited his role as Ben Weston; he returned in the new role of Alex Kiriakis, the son of Justin Kiriakis (Wally Kurth) and Anjelica Deveraux (Judith Chapman) on Days of Our Lives on July 26.

== Filmography ==
Year	Title	Role	Notes
2009	Bride Wars	Jeff	Movie
2011	Supah Ninjas	Colin Kirk	1 episode
2012–14	The Price Is Right	Himself/Model	89 episodes
2012	The Secret Life of the American Teenager	Guy #3	1 episode
2012	The Middle	Ben	1 episode
2012	Desperate Housewives	Muscular stock boy	s08e18
2012	Think Like a Man	Valet	Film
2013	All My Children	Peter Cortlandt	43 episodes
2014	I Didn't Do It	Dash	1 episode
2014	Surviving Jack	Derek	2 episodes
2014–2022	Days of Our Lives	Ben Weston	Series regular
2015	Viral	Blaine	1 episode
2015	I Know Where Lizzie Is	Gale Chambers	Television film
2016	American Fright Fest	Steph	Direct-to-video
2018	Papa	Ben Freidman	Main role
2018	Ladies of the Lake	Ethan Wyatt	Main role
2018	Stalked by a Reality Star	Brad	Main role
2021-2022	Days of Our Lives: Beyond Salem	Ben Weston	Miniseries
2022–present	Days of Our Lives	Alexander "Alex" Kiriakis	Series regular
