= Freddie Smith =

American television actor (born 1988)

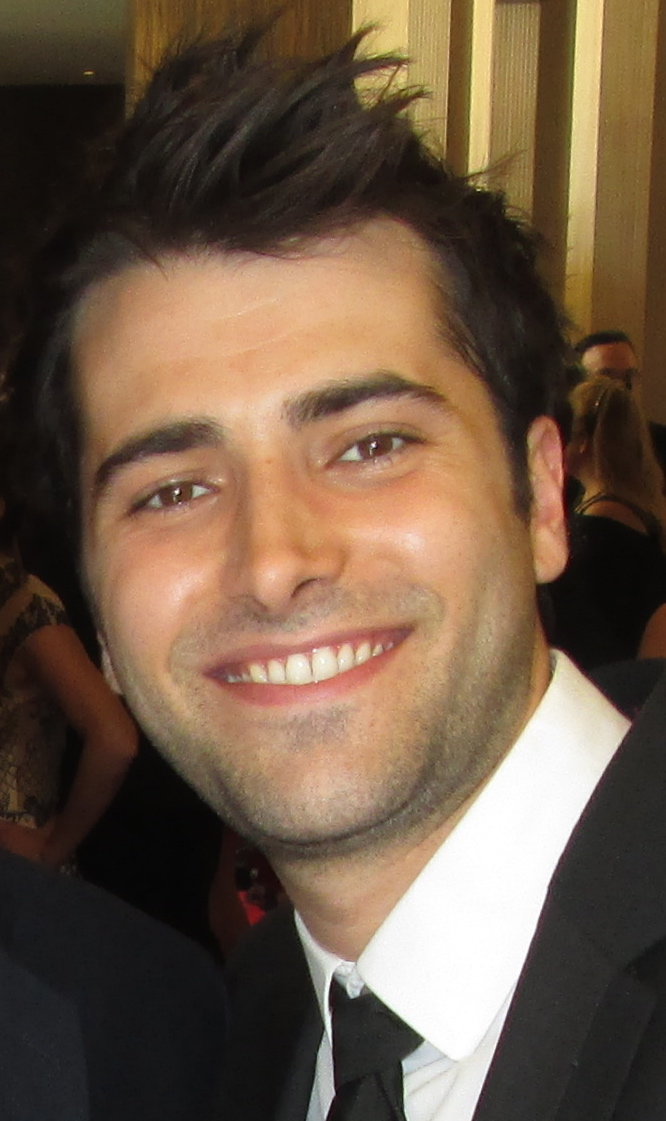
- Smith at the 41st Daytime Emmy Awards
- Born: Freddie Matthew Smith; March 19, 1988 (age 38); Ashtabula, Ohio, U.S.
- Education: Edgewood Senior High School (class of 2006)
- Occupations: Actor; director; producer; writer
- Years active: 2005–present
- Spouse: Alyssa Tabit Smith (m. 2020)

Freddie Matthew Smith (born March 19, 1988) is an American television actor. He is best known for his character Sonny Kiriakis, the first openly gay contract role on the daytime soap opera Days of Our Lives for which he won the Daytime Emmy Award for Outstanding Younger Actor in a Drama Series in 2015. He also briefly portrayed Marco Salazar in the new franchise of 90210 aired on The CW.

== Career ==
After high school, Smith moved to Los Angeles, beginning his acting career in 2008 appearing a cameo role in the paranormal series Medium playing a senior boy which is unaccredited during that episode. He appeared in the short film titled Weak Species co-starring Erik Smith and in the film One Wish released in 2010. He also has done commercials for Kay Jewelers, Taco Bell, Carl's Jr, McDonald's and Verizon.

On January 9, 2011, it was reported that he had joined the cast of The CW series 90210, in a recurring role as Marco, a gay soccer player who will become involved with Teddy Montgomery (Trevor Donovan). He appeared in 5 episodes of the third season including the season finale. On July 17, 2011 The CW announced that Marco will not return in season 4 as Teddy's boyfriend, having broken up with him over the summer. Besides 90210, he took up the role of Jackson "Sonny" Kiriakis in Days of Our Lives, the first openly gay contracted character in the hit daytime soap opera (Ryan Scott had previously played the non-contract, openly gay role of Harold Wentworth between 2000 and 2003). Smith's character would become romantically involved with Will Horton, played by Chandler Massey, garnering immense popularity with fans and becoming the show's first same-sex supercouple (commonly referred to by the portmanteau "WilSon"). In 2013, Smith received his first Daytime Emmy Award nomination in the Outstanding Younger Actor category. In 2015, Smith won a Daytime Emmy Award in the category of Outstanding Younger Actor. That same year, Smith announced his decision to depart Days of Our Lives; Smith returned for a guest stint in the months following his departure. In April 2016, it was announced that Smith had re-joined the soap, and is scheduled to first appear in July. In October 2017, the actor's character took part in a double Salem wedding. When asked what the wedding meant for Sonny and Paul (Christopher Sean) and without giving away spoilers Smith stated, "I mean, it's huge for Paul. This is his very first wedding, his first and only … For Sonny, it's a huge step forward because it shows that he's officially able to move on from Will … It's a huge stepping stone in their relationship." Ultimately, the characters would not wed and Smith's character would eventually reunite with and remarry his true love Will Horton after Massey returned to the series. In February 2020, it was announced that Smith along with Massey would both exit the roles as the couple would be written out of the show. Smith made his last regular appearance on September 1, 2020.

== Personal life ==
Freddie Smith was born in Ashtabula, Ohio, to Fred and Renee Smith. He grew up as an only child but is very close with two of his cousins. Smith "lived and breathed basketball" until his senior year in high school when a friend suggested he take a theater art class. Smith graduated from Edgewood Senior High School in 2006.

On October 6, 2014, Smith crashed his car in Kingsville Township, Ohio, near his alma mater, critically injuring his passenger, Alyssa Tabit. He pleaded guilty to vehicular assault and DUI and was sentenced on February 18, 2015. He was sentenced to two years' probation. His driver license was suspended for one year. He also was ordered to pay $1,400 in fines. Tabit wrote a letter to the judge asking for Smith to be spared prison. Smith married Alyssa Tabit on December 31, 2020.

== Filmography ==
=== Film ===
Year	Title	Role	Notes
2009	Weak Species	Jock 3	Short film
2010	One Wish	Sara's Boyfriend	
2015	Hiker	Ryan Howland	also director, executive producer, writer and editor

=== Television ===
Year	Title	Role	Notes
2008	Medium	Senior Boy	Episode: "But for the Grace of God"
2011	90210	Marco Salazar	Recurring role; 5 episodes
2011	ACME Hollywood Dream Role	Himself	Episode: "Freddie Smith"
2011–2020	Days of Our Lives	Sonny Kiriakis	Series regular; 2011–15, 2016–2020
2013	Addicts Anonymous	Gary Goldberg	Recurring role; 6 episodes

=== Music videos ===
Year	Title	Role	Artist
2018	"Give Me Your Hand"	Himself	Shannon K

== Awards and nominations ==
List of acting awards and nominations
Year	Award	Category	Title	Result	Ref.
2013	Daytime Emmy Award	Outstanding Younger Actor in a Drama Series	Days of Our Lives	Nominated	
2015	Daytime Emmy Award	Outstanding Younger Actor in a Drama Series	Days of Our Lives	Won	
