= Lisa de Cazotte =

American television producer

- Born: Lisa Smith; November 2, 1961; Westchester, New York, U.S.
- Died: December 7, 2019 (aged 58); Los Angeles, California
- Education: Fordham University
- Occupation: Television producer
- Years active: 36
- Known for: Daytime soap operas
- Spouse: Antoine de Cazotte
- Parent(s): Charles and Beatrice Smith

Lisa de Cazotte /də kəˈzɒt/ (née Smith; November 2, 1961 – December 7, 2019) was an American soap opera producer.

== Biography ==
Born Lisa Smith in Westchester, New York, de Cazotte was the daughter of Charles and Beatrice Smith and grew up in Dobbs Ferry, New York. She graduated from Fordham University, later marrying French documentary producer Antoine de Cazotte.

De Cazotte started as an intern at the daytime soap opera One Life to Live in 1983, working her way up to Associate Producer and then Coordinating Producer. She served as a producer on Santa Barbara from 1991 to 1993, coordinating producer on All My Children from 1994 to 1996, and supervising producer on Sunset Beach from 1997 to 1999.

She was an executive producer of Passions for its entire run, from July 5, 1999 to August 7, 2008. She next became the executive producer of General Hospital: Night Shift for its second season in 2008. De Cazotte returned to All My Children as a producer under Julie Hanan Carruthers from 2009 to 2010. She also served as co-executive producer of Days of Our Lives from January 30, 2012 to July 31, 2015. On December 19, 2017, she joined The Young and the Restless as a supervising producer.

== Positions held ==
- One Life to Live: Associate Producer (1987–1989)
- One Life to Live: Coordinating Producer (1989–1991)
- Santa Barbara: Producer (1991–January 15, 1993)
- All My Children: Coordinating Producer (1994–1996)
- Sunset Beach: Supervising Producer (1997–1999)
- Passions: Executive Producer (July 5, 1999 – August 7, 2008)
- General Hospital: Night Shift: Executive Producer (Season two, July 22, 2008 – October 21, 2008)
- All My Children: Producer (February 2, 2009–January 2010)
- Days of Our Lives: Co-Executive Producer (January 30, 2012 – July 31, 2015)
- The Young and the Restless: Supervising Producer (December 19, 2017 – September 21, 2018; February 20, 2019 – 2019)

== Awards and nominations ==
Award	Category	Series	Year	Result	Ref.
Daytime Emmy Award	Outstanding Drama Series	All My Children	1995	Nominated	
Daytime Emmy Award	Outstanding Drama Series	All My Children	1996	Nominated	
Daytime Emmy Award	Outstanding Drama Series	All My Children	1997	Nominated	
Daytime Emmy Award	Outstanding Drama Series	All My Children	2010	Nominated	
Daytime Emmy Award	Outstanding Drama Series	Days of Our Lives	2013	Won	
Daytime Emmy Award	Outstanding Drama Series	Days of Our Lives	2014	Nominated	
Daytime Emmy Award	Outstanding Drama Series	Days of Our Lives	2015	Won	
Daytime Emmy Award	Outstanding Drama Series	Days of Our Lives	2016	Nominated	
Daytime Emmy Award	Outstanding Drama Series	The Young and the Restless	2019	Won	
