= André DiMera =

- Days of Our Lives character
- Thaao Penghlis as André DiMera
- Portrayed by: Thaao Penghlis (1983–2022); John de Lancie (1983, mask); Wayne Northrop (1983-1984, mask)
- Duration: 1983–1984; 1993–1996; 2002–2005; 2007; 2015–2019; 2022
- First appearance: September 1, 1983
- Last appearance: April 29, 2022
- Created by: Margaret DePriest and Sheri Anderson
- Introduced by: Betty Corday and Al Rabin (1983); Ken Corday and Tom Langan (1993); Ken Corday and Stephen Wyman (2007); Ken Corday, Albert Alarr and Greg Meng (2015)
In-universe information
- Other names: Tony DiMera; Eugene Bradford; Roman Brady; Salem Slasher
- Occupation: Businessman; Mobster
- Family: DiMera
- Father: Stefano DiMera
- Half-brothers: Tony DiMera (legal); Peter Blake (adoptive); Stefan DiMera; Jake Lambert; Benjy Hawk; EJ DiMera; Chad DiMera
- Half-sisters: Kristen DiMera (adoptive); Renée DuMonde; Megan DiMera; Lexie Carver
- Spouse: Kristen DiMera (1994–95) (Note: The marriage is considered to be invalid due to André pretending to be Tony.); Kate Roberts (2017–18)
- Stepsons: Austin Reed (2017); Lucas Horton (2017); Rex Brady (2017); Philip Kiriakis (2017)
- Stepdaughters: Billie Reed (2017); Cassie Brady (2017)
- Grandfathers: Santo DiMera
- Uncles: Ryan Brady
- Nephews: Theo Carver; Steven Hawk; Johnny DiMera; Thomas DiMera
- Nieces: Sydney DiMera; Grace Brady; Charlotte DiMera; Rachel Black (adoptive)

André DiMera is a fictional character from the NBC daytime soap opera, Days of Our Lives. The role was originated in 1983 by Thaao Penghlis when André was introduced as the nephew of Stefano DiMera (Joseph Mascolo). Having undergone plastic surgery to look identical to Stefano's stepson, Tony (also Penghlis), André—on Stefano's behalf—sets out to frame Roman Brady (Wayne Northrop) for a series of murders. However, plans go awry as André claims several victims including Stefano's daughter Renée DuMonde (Philece Sampler). André's later plans to help Stefano heal his brain tumor and get revenge on their enemies culminates in André's presumed death in November 1984.

While Penghlis would return to the series for several stints, between 1993 and 2007, it was in the role of Tony. However, in 2007, the character's history is retconned and it is revealed that André was very much alive and had been masquerading as Tony since 1993. (Note: Whenever the name Tony appears in quotations marks – "Tony" – it is referring to André masquerading as Tony.) The character's return in 1993 saw him feud with John Black (Drake Hogestyn) for the affections of Stefano's adopted daughter Kristen Blake (Eileen Davidson). Hoping to destroy John forever, André fakes his death and frames John landing him on death row—but André's schemes are exposed and John is cleared. André, still under the guise of Tony returned in 2002 having developed an obsession with John's wife Marlena Evans (Deidre Hall) and between 2003 and 2004, he masterminds the Salem Stalker murders in which he fakes the deaths of several Salem citizens, himself included, and holds the "victims" captive on an island; the character is written out in 2005, when he was sent to prison. The character returns in 2007 and after several dangerous and sometimes lethal schemes, his true identity is revealed. With his cover blown, André's treachery continues and Stefano disowns him and the character seemingly commits suicide by unplugging his own life support in October 2007. Penghlis would reprise the role in 2015 when André is revealed to be Stefano's biological son. In January 2018, André is killed via blunt force trauma by an unknown person, which was later revealed to be Abigail Deveraux in self-defence. He continued making appearances until October 31, 2019, and in April 2022.

== Storylines ==
=== 1983–1984 ===
In 1983, André is summoned to Salem by his uncle Stefano DiMera (Joseph Mascolo) having recently undergone plastic surgery to look like Stefano's son Tony (Thaao Penghlis). With Tony unwilling to cooperate with his demands, Stefano enlisted the ruthless André to help him run the DiMera Empire. Their first order of business: to rid Salem of Stefano's enemy Roman Brady (Wayne Northrop) by framing him for the Salem Slasher murders. Wearing a Roman mask, André kills prostitute Daisy Hawkins (Winnie Gardner) in November 1983 in front of Roman's wife Marlena Evans (Deidre Hall) and Sandy Horton (Pamela Roylance) leading to the real Roman's arrest. In 1984, Tony's ex-wife Anna (Leann Hunley) discovers Tony chained up in his own penthouse and André locks her away with him as he is revealed to be behind the murders. Roman rescues them and Tony confronts his cousin André only for him to escape to Stefano's island. André's other victims include Stefano's daughter Renée DuMonde, Nurse Kelly Harper (Robin Eisenman), Marlena's cousin Trista Evans (Barbara Crampton), and Letitia Bradford (Ruth Buzzi). During his time posing as Tony, André also goes after Gwen Davies (Anne-Marie Martin), Police officer Joan Hopkins (Sheila deWindt), and Hope Williams (Kristian Alfonso) – all of whom managed to survive. With Stefano dying from a brain tumor, he and André set out to obtain the three prisms that hold the key to keeping Stefano alive and they plan to get revenge on their enemies in the process. In November 1984, André hijacks a plane on its way to Haiti and it crashes on a deserted island killing Tony's mother Daphne (Madlyn Rhue). During a confrontation with Tony, André falls into a patch of quicksand and is presumed dead.

=== 1993–1996 ===
In 1993, "Tony" is reintroduced as the fiancé of Stefano's adopted daughter Kristen DiMera (Eileen Davidson). "Tony" and Kristen agree to grant their father his dying wish to see them marry before he dies despite her love for John Black (Drake Hogestyn). However, on the wedding day, Kristen leaves "Tony" at the altar to help John and Marlena find their daughter Belle. In the meantime, "Tony" befriends Billie Reed (Lisa Rinna) and helps her regain control of her cosmetics company Countess Wilhelmina when he buys 49% of Titan Industries. "Tony" and Kristen are about to marry again when John interrupts the ceremony claiming to have evidence linking Stefano to the murder of Billie's father Curtis (Nick Benedict). As Stefano tries to escape, John shoots at his car and it goes off the road. Blaming John for Stefano's death, Kristen marries "Tony" on February 18, 1994. "Tony" later discovers that Stefano is alive but keeps quiet fearing Kristen will leave him. In late 1994, during a charity event at Stefano's New Orleans estate Maison Blanche, a fire breaks out and "Tony" is shocked to discover John and Marlena have been imprisoned there; Stefano is also revealed to be alive. "Tony" rushes back into the mansion to retrieve Stefano's computer which contains information about John's mysterious past and is left blind as the mansion explodes. Having learned of her husband's deception and attempts to get her pregnant by switching her birth control pills, Kristen leaves "Tony" for John. A devastated "Tony" plots to kill John only for Kristen to return to him when she learns John is a priest. "Tony" abandons his plans and eventually regains his eyesight but hides that fact hoping to catch Kristen and John in bed together. When Kristen abandons him again for John who has been relieved of his priestly vows, "Tony" discovers he has a fatal blood disease and with only a short time to live, he plots to frame John for his murder. "Tony" details his entire plan in a diary and also confides in Father Francis (Eric Christmas) who plans to tell John. However, "Tony" steals his blood pressure medication which leads to Father Francis suffering a heart attack that renders him comatose. As "Tony" attends the wedding of his adopted brother Peter Blake (Jason Brooks) and Jennifer Horton (Melissa Reeves), he manipulates John into threatening to kill him in public. "Tony" then shoots himself, and frames John. John is nearly sentenced to death until Kristen and Peter's mother Rachel (Pat Delany) presents the diary clearing John's name.

=== 2002–2007 ===
"Tony" makes a shocking return from the dead in the summer of 2002 when he crashes John and Marlena's anniversary celebration, having survived getting shot and still suffering his blood disease—which turns out to be a lie that Stefano convinced him. Having become obsessed with Marlena, "Tony" is ecstatic to discover that twins Rex (Eric Winter) and Cassie (Alexis Thorpe) are his children with Marlena and uses them to ingratiate himself to her. "Tony" and John are later shocked when they are led to believe that they are half brothers, through Daphne. Despite the familial revelation, they can never trust each other. "Tony" is later devastated to learn that he is not the twins father after all, and is furious with Stefano for keeping the truth from him. In 2003, "Tony" becomes the prime suspect in the Salem Stalker murders but Mickey Horton (John Clarke) agrees to defend him. As he plans to reveal the killer during the Horton Circus, "Tony" is attacked by a tiger and becomes the next victim of the killer—who turns out to be Marlena. "Tony" and the other victims are eventually revealed to be alive and being held captive on the island of Melaswen. "Tony" later reveals himself as the mastermind behind it all looking for revenge on everyone that has wronged him—specifically John for stealing Kristen from him. "Tony" fakes his death again after a confrontation with John only to continue to wreak havoc from the beyond the grave as he causes an explosion that nearly kills some of the captives as they try to escape the island. He even recaptures some of them and holds them prisoner in Europe at the DiMera Castle. "Tony" assists Sami Brady (Alison Sweeney) in her schemes to punish her enemies and satisfy his own thirst for revenge. Sami gets John hooked on painkillers only to have a change of heart when "Tony" takes some of her loved ones hostage. He tries to blackmail her into breaking him out of jail, but she refuses.

Using his wealth and power, "Tony" secures his release to take care of Stefano who is dying. To save his father, "Tony" kidnaps a comatose John and steals his kidney. However, when Stefano doesn't recover, "Tony" on Stefano's orders goes after Sami's unborn child fathered by Stefano's other son EJ Wells (James Scott). EJ foils their plans and kidnaps Stefano in exchange for "Tony" agreeing to end the feud between the Brady and DiMera families. Stefano reluctantly agrees to end the feud but "Tony" has other plans. However, it isn't until "Tony" fakes his half sister Lexie (Renée Jones)'s death and tries to kill Bo and Hope when they rescue her that Stefano realizes he has created a monster. Though he claims innocence in public, in private he places blame on the presumably deceased André. Anna soon returns and she quickly realizes something not right with her ex-husband. On Anna's hunch, Bo confronts him and André finally reveals himself. During a scuffle, Bo forces André to reveal Tony's whereabouts and just before he falls of a roof and ends up in the hospital where he escapes having faked his injuries. Despite his relationship with Stefano falling apart, André continues terrorizing the Bradys and Tony. Stefano disowns André when he takes the lives of Stefano's longtime henchman Bart (Steve Blackwood), and Stefano's son, Benjy Hawk (Jim Lunsford). Hoping to get back into Stefano's good graces, André comes to rescue Stefano who is being held captive by Steve Johnson (Stephen Nichols) and takes Hope captive in the process. André refuses to release Hope forcing Bo to shoot him leading to André falling off the roof again—this time he is badly injured. Shawn Brady saw a chance to end André's reign of terror by turning off his life support but couldn't bring himself to do it. However, André witnessed Shawn's struggle and turned off the machines himself hoping Shawn would be blamed for his death. While Shawn is cleared, prior to his death André had put a hit out on John. Just days after André's apparent death, John is struck and hit by a speeding car. However, Stefano revives John and tries to mold him into André's image, attempting to create the perfect soldier.

=== 2015–2018 ===
André resurfaces in September 2015 worried about Stefano's declining health after a heart attack and it is revealed that he is Stefano's biological son and not his nephew. André buys up Aiden Jennings (Daniel Cosgrove)'s debt in order to keep him in line with Stefano's schemes. Meanwhile, André clashes with Stefano's youngest son Chad (Billy Flynn) who is being framed for murder. André publicly announces himself at the wake of Will Horton (Guy Wilson) in October 2015 where his apology for his past misdeeds falls on deaf ears. He also publicly announces that a letter from his mother revealed that Stefano is his biological father. André orders Aiden to kill Hope Brady on their wedding night and collect the insurance money to repay his debt. André's scheme is also to help clear Chad's name despite Chad's disapproval. André later kidnaps Sami, who has discovered he is trying to supplant Stefano as head of the DiMera empire. Sami escapes and empties all of Stefano's accounts, so André brainwashes Chad to seduce Belle and find out where the money is hidden. Chad breaks free from André's mind control and disowns him and Stefano.

André becomes suspicious when Stefano disappears and eventually finds his body in a construction site. The site is set for demolition, and collapses on André, who survives with a lacerated cheek wound. André becomes convinced that Hope murdered Stefano. He befriends Aiden's son Chase, and uses him to plant a bomb in Hope's place. Hope and Rafe frame André for Stefano's murder, and he is sent to prison until he convinces Aiden to get him released from prison. State being released, André tries to kill Rafe and Hope by rigging an old farmhouse to explode with them in it. but they survive. André forms a tentative alliance with Aiden to get Justin fired as the district attorney, and Aiden replaces him as the district attorney until he leaves town. André also forms a mutual beneficial partnership with Kate that evolves into a friendship as Kate encourages André to become a better man. André helps Chad capture Clyde when he escapes from prison, and he and Chad slowly start to bond. Soon after, André publicly outs for Hope killing Stefano and she is sent to prison where she meets Hattie Adams, whom André had previously romanced and framed for embezzlement. Abby returns to town, having been presumed dead for a few months. It is revealed that André had helped Abby fake her death and hide out with her grandmother, Laura. Because of that, Abby care to rely on André and often came to his defense.

André was briefly accused of stealing from DiMera Enterprises, but suspicion turned to Stefano when it was revealed that the body in Stefano's grave didn't match his DNA, and Stefano was ultimately confirmed to be alive, but it was just Shane posing as Stefano to get Hope out of prison. Shane and Steve later saw security footage of a man that looked exactly like Stefano. André feuded with Eduardo Hernandez, his son Dario, and Deimos Kiriakis for control of the Orwell, which resulted in Deimos poisoning André and kidnapping Chad and Gabby. André teamed up with Eduardo to kidnap Sonny, hoping for a hostage exchange, but Deimos refused and revealed that André had stolen the Orwell device from its true inventor, which turned out to be Drew Donovan, who erased the Orwell permanently.

Chad and Abby invited André and Kate to move back into the mansion, and André noticed Chad and Gabi getting close, though he stood by his belief that Chad and Abby were meant to be together, but Kate wanted Chad and Gabi to get together. Abby broke up with Chad and he and Gabi got together. After Chad was lost in a plane crash, André married Kate, so she could be CEO of DiMera Enterprises, since the board deemed André as unstable. André and Theo helped Abby delete the photo of Chad standing over Deimos’ dead body, wiping the knife clean. Dario Hernandez was using the photo to blackmail Abby into staying married to him. Abby and Chad reconciled once the whole truth came out.

André wanted an equal partnership with Kate, so he turned to Marlena for help in proving he was sane, so he could agree the CEO position for Kate. Hattie was posing as Marlena, and publicly declared André as insane and had him locked up in a mental institution. André was released after Hattie was exposed, but faced backlash from Chad and Kate for his actions. Kate and André agreed to trust and respect each other as long as they stay married. Chad and Abby planned to remarry in a double ceremony with Paul and Sonny, but Ben Weston interrupted the double wedding and announced that Will was alive.

Desperate to prove himself, André agreed to help track down Dr. Rolf, who had revived Will after Ben had murdered him. André lured Rolf back to Salem, and on Kate's advice, agreed to let Hope handle it. André as suspected in being behind the event hacking going on at DiMera, leading to Theo being shot, and Chad accusing André of getting Theo shot, and kicking him out of the mansion. Kate confessed to André that she had sent Theo to the building where he had been shot. André initially planned to tell Chad the truth, but changed his mind when Abby convinced Chad not to kick André out. Kate would later be exposed by Steve, but André stood up for Kate, leading Abby to realize that André had fallen in love with Kate, which he confirmed. On Abby's advice, André kissed Kate on New Year's Eve, but the festivities were interrupted by the arrival of Vivian Alamain and her long lost son with Stefano, Stefan. André confessed his feelings to Kate, and she reciprocated them, but André was revealed to be working with Vivian and Stefan, so he could be the de facto head of DiMera. After firing Gabi, and stealing her company through a legal loophole in Gabi's contract, André is murdered by being hit in the head with the urn that had Tony's ashes in it, and his body is found by Abigail. It is later revealed that Abigail killed him partly in self-defence, but she later suffered from multiple-personality disorder and Dr Laura, one of her alters, had blocked it out of her memory for protection. André last appears as a hallucination to Kate, where he taunts her over shooting Vivian.

== Development ==
In May 2015, it was announced that Thaao Penghlis had started filming scenes and would return to the series on a contractual basis. Penghlis's return would coincide with the show's 50th anniversary and he'd reprise the role of André. Of his return, Penghlis said, "I love being a disturber of the peace... . I didn't expect to be asked back for the 50th anniversary but it's been wonderful." Penghlis revealed, "This is the first time I've been hired because I'm older." He continued, "But to sit in Stefano's chair requires experience and wisdom that only comes from having lived a while." For the first time, André is portrayed as a completely separate entity from Tony as opposed to just being Tony's evil doppelganger. On September 25, 2015, André's return reveals that he is actually Stefano's biological son. "I think they were looking to bring on a real villain, to not only create big conflict in Salem but to build up the dynasty," Penghlis said of the writers' decision to revive André instead of Tony (who historically is not a biological DiMera). André is back to watch over his father who has recently suffered a heart attack and he isn't happy with how Stefano has been treated lately. With the reveal of his true paternity, André develops a "Cain and Abel" like dynamic with Stefano's youngest son, Chad (Billy Flynn) due to Stefano favoring Chad.

== Reception ==
In 2020, Charlie Mason from Soaps She Knows placed Tony and André jointly at #28 on a list of the 35 most memorable characters from Days of Our Lives, commenting that "Thaao Penghlis’ lookalike connivers have to share an entry, if only because during any given era, we could never be sure which of them we were really watching."
