= Belle Black =

- Days of Our Lives character
- Martha Madison as Belle Black
- Portrayed by: Brianna and Chalice Fischette (1993–1995); Brianna and Brittany McConnell (1995–1998); Ashlyn and Kaylyn Messick (1998); Chelsea Butler (1998–1999); Kirsten Storms (1999–2004); Charity Rahmer (2004); Martha Madison (2004–present)
- Duration: 1993–2008; 2015–present
- First appearance: October 21, 1993
- Created by: James E. Reilly
- Introduced by: Ken Corday and Tom Langan (1993); Ken Corday, Albert Alarr and Greg Meng (2015); Ken Corday and Janet Spellman-Drucker (2024)
- Spin-off appearances: Last Blast Reunion (2019)
- Kirsten Storms as Belle Black
In-universe information
- Other names: Belle Brady; Belle Kiriakis; Isabella Black; Isabella Brady; Isabella Kiriakis
- Occupation: District attorney (2024–present); Legal aid; Nightclub owner; Attorney; Fashion designer; Candy Striper
- Parents: John Black; Marlena Evans
- Half-brothers: DJ Craig; Eric Brady; Brady Black; Paul Narita
- Half-sisters: Sami Brady
- Spouse: Philip Kiriakis (2005–2007); Shawn-Douglas Brady (2007–2016, 2020–2024)
- Children: Claire Brady
- Grandfathers: Timothy Robicheaux; Leopold Alamain (adoptive); Frank Evans
- Grandmothers: Maude Robicheaux; Philomena Alamain (adoptive); Martha Evans
- Aunts and uncles: Lawrence Alamain (adoptive); Samantha Evans
- Nephews: Will Horton; Johnny DiMera; Tate Black
- Nieces: Allie Horton; Sydney DiMera; Grace Brady (legal); Rachel Black; Mackenzie Horton
- First cousins: Nicholas Alamain (adoptive)

Belle Black is a fictional character from Days of Our Lives, an American soap opera on the NBC network. Created by the head writer James E. Reilly, she was born on October 21, 1993, as the only child of supercouple John Black and Marlena Evans. She is also one-half of the supercouple Shawn Brady and Belle Black. Initially portrayed by several child actors between 1993 and 1999, Belle was rapidly aged to a teenager when Kirsten Storms took over the role from 1999 to 2004. Charity Rahmer briefly portrayed Belle for a month before being replaced by Martha Madison, who played the character from August 2004 to March 2008, when Belle departed the show. Madison returned as Belle for the soap's 50th Anniversary Celebrations in 2015 but departed the following year. Belle then appeared for various stints of different lengths before rejoining the regular cast again in 2020. She departed again in 2023. Madison returned to the role when Belle returned to Salem in November 2024.

== Casting ==
Initially portrayed by several child actors between 1993 and 1999, Belle was rapidly aged to a teenager when Kirsten Storms was hired to portray the character from August 5, 1999, to July 16, 2004. Charity Rahmer briefly played the role from July 19 to August 9, 2004. Martha Madison appeared in the role from August 10, 2004, to March 21, 2008. In June 2015, Madison confirmed she would reprise the role of Belle in November, as part of the show's fiftieth anniversary celebration. Belle returned on November 25 of that year. In March 2016, it was revealed that Madison was among four actors who have been let go from the soap, with Belle departing on September 12. However, on September 7, 2016, it was confirmed that Madison had been re-hired shortly following her firing and would remain on the soap indefinitely. Madison returned on January 24, 2017, and departed on February 20, 2017.

In July 2017, it was announced that Madison would return to the series. Madison returned from December 4, 2017, to March 27, 2018. Madison then appeared from August 21 to November 8, 2018. Madison then aired from March 18 to July 9, 2019.

In November 2019, it was announced that Madison would again reprise the role for the digital series, Last Blast Reunion. It was then announced in May 2020 that the character would once again return during the summer, with her return airing on June 8, 2020. In August 2023, Madison announced she would again exit the role; she exited on November 9.

In April 2024, it was announced Madison would return to the role. Madison's return as Belle premiered on November 8 of the same year.

== Storylines ==
Belle is the daughter of John Black (Drake Hogestyn) and Dr. Marlena Evans (Deidre Hall). Originally, she is believed to be the daughter of Marlena and her husband, Roman Brady (Wayne Northrop). Belle, however, is the product of an affair between Marlena and John. Roman and Marlena's daughter, Sami Brady (Alison Sweeney), becomes aware of the affair, and purposely changes the paternity test. After Belle is born, Sami kidnaps her and tries to sell her on the black market. John thwarts her, and rescues Belle. At Belle's christening, Marlena and John's affair is revealed, and Stefano DiMera (Joseph Mascolo) later reveals the truth of Belle's paternity through Sami's diary.

As a teen at Salem High School, Belle begins an ill-fated relationship with bad boy Philip Kiriakis (Jay Kenneth Johnson) but soon falls in love with Shawn-Douglas Brady (Jason Cook). Best friends with Mimi Lockhart (Farah Fath), Belle's peers are shocked to see her burgeoning friendship with "Ghoul Girl" Chloe Lane (Nadia Bjorlin). In 2001, Belle goes on a class trip to Puerto Rico. Belle, Shawn, and Philip embark on their own missing-jewel hunt in search of a ruby that belongs to Alice Horton. After a near-drowning, the teens are successful and Shawn is able to return the ruby to his great-grandmother. Once back in Salem, a troubled classmate, Jan Spears (Heather Lauren Olsen), confides to Shawn that she had been raped by the father of recent arrivals to Salem, siblings Nicole (Arianne Zucker) and Brandon Walker (Matt Cedeño), and is now pregnant. Shawn agrees to claim paternity, thereby destroying his blossoming relationship with Belle. Despite her sense of loss, Belle is accepted to Columbia University, and makes it through her senior year as a class salutatorian. Moreover, after Jan's miscarriage and the truth of her rape comes out, Belle forgives Shawn and tentatively reunites with him at the "Last Blast" Dance. Later that summer, during meteor showers on the Fourth of July, Belle and Shawn rescue the faux-alien-Gemini-twins, Rex Brady and Cassie Brady (Alexis Thorpe), who as it turns out were the children of Roman and Kate Roberts (Lauren Koslow).

Deciding not to move to New York City, Belle attends Salem University where she lives in the same campus dorm with Shawn, Rex and Cassie, while more economically challenged Mimi lives at home. Belle and Shawn commit to a future together, but suffer another setback during Victor and Nicole's New Year's Eve wedding when Colin Murphy (Justin Melvey) is murdered. Though Shawn shot at Colin and missed, he still felt responsible. Meanwhile, Belle works as an intern at her father's company, Basic Black. Headed for success as a fashion designer, Basic Black opts to feature Belle's designs, but Belle becomes increasingly disturbed when some of Salem's most prominent citizens are murdered by the Salem Stalker. The killer murders nine people before police uncovered the killer's identity, Belle's own mother Marlena. A devastated Belle lies to Shawn to provide an alibi for her mother. When Alice Horton (Frances Reid), Shawn's great-grandmother is murdered, Shawn leaves town. Unbeknownst to Belle at the time, Jan Spears held Shawn captive in a cage; this allowed Belle to grow closer to Philip. Harboring a secret crush, Philip provides Belle with some much-needed solace and eventually persuades her to be with him. When Shawn returns, his personality undergoes a profound change. Philip and Belle agree to marry; Shawn only realizes his true feelings for Belle on the eve of her wedding to Philip. Belle also realizes the true extent of her feelings for Shawn, but fails to tell Philip before he ships out with his Marine unit. Shawn then attempts to rescue his former friend when Philip is taken hostage.

Belle stays married given the extent of Philip's injuries. Later, Belle gives birth to Claire, who is really Shawn's daughter. Eventually, Claire's paternity is revealed, and Belle tells Phillip that she does not love him. Pregnant again, doctors tell Belle the baby would not survive. Philip makes the decision to terminate Belle's pregnancy after assuring her that he would not let the baby die. Utterly devastated, Belle leaves Philip and moves in with her parents. Ready to resume her relationship with Shawn, Belle begins to pressure Shawn to be a more responsible father. Shawn opts to respond by sleeping with former prostitute, Willow Stark. After Victor kidnaps Claire, a custody battle ensues, pitting Brady against Kiriakis. The conflict came to a head while at sea when Philip loses hold of Claire and the baby is swept overboard. Belle and Shawn eventually reunite with Claire; Shawn proposes marriage even as Belle and Philip grew closer. The passion-tossed triangle continues to undergo several more trials and predictable miscommunications when on November 23, 2007, Shawn and Belle marry even though Belle continued to have feelings for Philip. In March 2008, Shawn and Belle once again reconcile and decide to sail the world, strengthen their marriage, and bond as a family by taking Claire with them (as Bo and Hope did with Shawn), then together they are written off the daytime soap.

Seven years later, Belle returns to Salem with Shawn and their teenage daughter Claire. In September 2016 Belle and Shawn move to Hong Kong leaving Claire in Salem with Marlena and John.

== Reception ==
Charlie Mason from Soaps She Knows put Rahmer's portrayal of Belle on his list of the worst soap opera recasts, saying that she could not replace Storms as she had "become so well-loved by fans of the NBC soap that she seemed irreplaceable". Mason also commented that Madison "made the role her own" when she stepped into the role.

== See also ==
- Shawn Brady and Belle Black
