= Marlena Evans =

Fictional character from Days of Our Lives

- Days of Our Lives character
- Deidre Hall as Marlena Evans
- Portrayed by: Deidre Hall (1976–present); Eileen Davidson (1995, 2021) (Note: During the Possession storyline in 1995, Marlena, possessed by the Devil, took the forms of Kristen DiMera and Isabella Toscano, portrayed by Davidson and Greason respectively.); Staci Greason (1995); Drake Hogestyn (2021) (Note: In December 2021, when possessed by the Devil again, Marlena morphed into the guises of John Black (Drake Hogestyn), Steve Johnson (Stephen Nichols), and Rafe Hernandez (Galen Gering).); Stephen Nichols (2021); Galen Gering (2021)
- Duration: 1976–1987; 1991–2009; 2011–present
- First appearance: June 21, 1976
- Created by: Pat Falken Smith
- Introduced by: Betty Corday (1976); Ken Corday and Al Rabin (1991); Ken Corday, Noel Maxam, and Greg Meng (2011); Ken Corday (2021–2022)
- Book appearances: A Secret in Salem
- Crossover appearances: Days of Our Lives: Night Sins (1993); Days of Our Lives: Beyond Salem (2021–2022); Days of Our Lives: A Very Salem Christmas (2021)
In-universe information
- Other names: Salem Stalker; Marlena Craig; Marlena Brady; Marlena Bradford; Marlena Black; Samantha Evans; Kristen DiMera; Isabella Toscano; Hattie Adams; John Black; Steve Johnson; Rafe Hernandez
- Occupation: Psychiatrist; Radio host; Therapist; Wedding officiant
- Parents: Frank Evans; Martha Evans
- Siblings: Samantha Evans
- Spouse: Alex North (1970s–2006); Don Craig (1979–1981); Roman Brady (1983–1994); Eugene Bradford (1984); John Black (1986–1991, 1999–2005, 2006–2008, 2009–2012, 2013–2014, 2018–2025) (Note: The first four marriages were invalid, due to Marlena's marriages to Alex and Roman, and John's marriage to Hope.)
- Children: DJ Craig; Eric Brady; Sami Brady; Dominic Marino; Belle Black
- Stepchildren: Brady Black; Paul Narita; Carrie Brady
- Grandchildren: Will Horton; Claire Brady; Allie Horton; Johnny DiMera; Sydney DiMera; Grace Brady (legal); Noah Reed (step); Holly Jonas (surrogate); Arianna Horton (great); Tate Black (step); Mackenzie Horton; Henry Horton (great); Rachel Black (step); Jude Roman Brady; Trey DiMera (adoptive/great); Olivia DiMera (great)
- Aunts and uncles: Robert Evans
- First cousins: Trista Evans

Marlena Evans is a fictional character on the American soap opera Days of Our Lives, a long-running serial about working life in the fictional town of Salem. She has been played by actress Deidre Hall since 1976, but the character was absent from the show from 1987 to August 1991 and again from January 2009 to September 2011. Marlena was created by scriptwriter Pat Falken Smith and executive producer Betty Corday, and has become one of Days of our Lives' most well-known characters. Hall made her debut on the soap on June 21, 1976, currently making her the second longest running actress on the serial, surpassed only by Suzanne Rogers (Maggie Horton).

Throughout the course of her existence on the program, she has experienced what some consider to be the most outrageous circumstances of any character in soap opera history. These would include being possessed by the devil two times (in 1994 and 2021); a plummet from a 30-story-window (which she survived); being used as a surrogate for genetically engineered babies, Rex and Cassie, during a four-year coma, where she was presumed dead after being involved in a plane crash; being mind-controlled to believe she was a serial killer; being targeted by several serial killers; and becoming pregnant late in life and suffering a miscarriage, which caused her to have hysterical amnesia. She has also been kidnapped numerous times over the past 45 years. She is a doctor, wife, mother, twin, grandmother and great-grandmother.

Marlena has been a staple in the US press during her time on Days of Our Lives, a representative of the symbiosis between American's soaps and tabloid soap magazines. Widely read tabloids, such as Soap Opera Digest and Soap Opera Weekly, would routinely publish forthcoming developments in Marlena's storylines. Marlena was well received by critics, and is notable for her popular pairing with John Black. The character is well-known even outside of the show's viewer-base. In 2010, Sheri Anderson (a former head writer for Days) began writing books about off-screen characters from the soap. John and Marlena were included in one called A Secret in Salem.

== Casting ==
Marlena was introduced as a guest character in June 1976, by executive producer Betty Corday. The show decided to cast actress Deidre Hall, who was already known in the soap world for her role as Barbara on The Young and the Restless. The character was brought in as the psychiatrist of already established character – Mickey Horton. This puts her in close contact with the soap's core family, The Hortons. This also allows her to meet her first new lover in Salem, Don Craig (Mickey's assistant). Specifically, she played a key role in a storyline involving her twin sister, Samantha Evans (who was played by Hall's real life twin, Andrea Hall) at the same sanitarium Mickey was committed to. The character proved to be popular, and they decided to put her on contract. Marlena eventually started a relationship with Roman Brady, who established her to a core family on the show, the Brady family. In the 1980s, Hall had decided to explore primetime. She landed the lead role on the family oriented series, Our House, and guest starred on other prime time series such as Wiseguy and Columbo. She left Days of Our Lives after her primetime and daytime schedule became too hard to balance. In 1991 (after the primetime series ended), Hall began to miss daytime's creative outlet, and returned to the show that same year. Her return prompted a 10% increase in the Nielsen ratings for the soap.

In 2009, after struggling in the ratings for years, Days of Our Lives received a two-year pickup. However, the soap's budget was decreased by 40%. To make do with the new financial restrictions, executive producer Ken Corday was forced to fire Deidre Hall and Drake Hogestyn. Marlena's on screen love interest, Drake Hogestyn, had been fired in early 2007 as a way to clear money in the budget. However, he was brought back in 2008 for storyline purposes and to please fans. The couple were quickly reunited after Drake returned; and then they traveled to Switzerland to treat John's physical disability. Fans were furious with the way the writers wrote John and Marlena out. In an interview with Nelson Branco, Deidre said, "Yes. There was enormous upheaval. I wasn't following a lot of the brouhaha but I was told fans and critics were upset. But it is what it is. Yes, it feels good to hear that fans miss Marlena. People are deeply attached to her."

After a brief two years off the canvas, Hall reprised her role as Marlena beginning in September 2011. Marlena's return was one of the many changes brought about by the soap in order to please old viewers and as an attempt to draw in some new ones. Her return was brought about in extreme changes on the soap, with characters coming and going. In an interview with Entertainment Weekly, Hall dished on her return saying: "It's dramatic, romantic and involves the entire town. They brought in two new head writers who really believe in things that our core audience believes in. They like romance. They don't like people buried alive, they don't like who's your daddy. For a couple like Marlena and John – who endured bouts of paralysis, amnesia, false deaths and mind control – that should come as a huge relief." It was also confirmed in July 2011 that Drake Hogestyn, who portrays Marlena's on-screen love interest John, will also return to the soap in September as well. Executive producer Ken Corday issued this statement, saying: "We are thrilled that Deidre and Drake are rejoining the show. I know their return will excite loyal fans and intrigue new viewers. We are gearing up for some amazing cast surprises and guest stars visiting Salem in the fall, launching a grand event airing on September 26."

=== Awards ===
Deidre Hall has won many awards for her portrayal of Marlena. She has won three Soap Opera Digest Awards for outstanding lead actress in 1984, 1985, and 1995. She also won two Soapy Awards for Lead Actress in 1982 and 1983. She won an Outstanding Contribution Award by a Lead Actress/Actor in 1986. Hall also received an award with Drake Hogestyn in 2005 for "Favorite Couple: John and Marlena". Deidre won two Lead Actress awards at the Soap Opera Update Awards in 1994 and 1995. She has been nominated for a Daytime Emmy in 1980, 1984, and 1985 respectively. She has however, never won an Emmy.

== Development ==
Marlena has been the subject of many high-profile storylines, including possession by the devil, a romantic relationship, and a serial killer storyline.

=== Possession ===
In 1995, Marlena was featured in a supernatural possession storyline. The storyline caused huge controversy and garnered a lot of attention to the soap. Soap Opera Digest editor Stephanie Sloane said the story "completely changed the face of daytime storytelling in the 1990s", but Entertainment Weekly called it "The Dumbest Soap Plot Ever". At the time, the head writer was James E. Reilly, known for outrageous storylines.

The story begins when the villainous Stefano DiMera gives Marlena mind-altering drugs whilst she is asleep, and with her hypnotised, whisks her away into his fantasy world of romance. The mental, emotional and spiritual abuse of this leaves her open to demonic possession. Marlena completely switches personalities, and she becomes possessed by the devil. John Black, who was a priest at the time, is forced to perform an emergency exorcism. In 2010, Ken Corday discussed the storyline in an anniversary retrospective:

Remember, The Exorcist was only about 25 years old at the time, and [writer] Reilly walked into my office and said we're going to do a storyline with Marlena possessed. And I said we're going to do The Exorcist? He said, "That's right." I said, "We're going to do a feature film?" And he said, "No, we're going to make it great. It's a serial." It was supposed to last three months, starting somewhere around Halloween and ending with a Christmas miracle. And he dragged it into Easter, and he ended it literally with John Black just standing over her saying one "Our Father," and that story was over. People remember because the effects were so strange. Here's this wonderful, goddess of beauty, wisdom, and light, and she's floating around with green eyes doing horrible things. That's an eye opener."

=== The Salem Stalker and Melaswen Island ===
Days of Our Lives had been losing viewers in early 2000. The show managed to lure back James E. Reilly, who had left the show in 1997 to create his own soap opera, Passions. NBC said at the time that the show "needed a fix, and we had the fix right here." James E. Reilly began crafting a big story for the 2003–2004 season. First, long-term veteran Abe Carver (James Reynolds) was shot at his front doorstep by a strange cloaked figure. Next, viewers saw Jack Deveraux (Matthew Ashford) attacked, and killed with a brick by the same cloaked figure that killed Abe. Next, recovering alcoholic Maggie Horton (Suzanne Rogers) got bludgeoned to death with a wine bottle. The next murder is when Caroline Brady (Peggy McCay) is poisoned. Viewers then saw bad girl Cassie Brady (Alexis Thorpe) fall out of a Halloween pinata with stab wounds. Marlena's ex-husband, Roman Brady (Josh Taylor) is murdered at his wedding to Kate Roberts. At the Horton circus, the serial killer releases a tiger (named Horton), and sets him loose on Tony DiMera. Tony is dying at the hospital, and the killer is revealed to be Marlena. Marlena's next victim is Doug Williams (Bill Hayes) who has been her friend for years. She kills him at Tom Horton's grave after he finds out she is the killer. The last murder occurs shortly after, as Alice Horton (Frances Reid) finds a bloody note at her husband's grave with Marlena's name on it. Subsequently, the evil Marlena murders Alice by choking her with her donuts. Marlena confesses, and is arrested by her husband, John Black. She is shot and killed on the prison rooftop. The storyline allowed Days of our Lives to reach #2 in the Nielsen chart for soaps.

After dwindling ratings again, the show made a decision. All the victims are brought back alive on the tropical island of Melaswen (New Salem spelled backwards). The fired actors (James Reynolds, Suzanne Rogers, Matthew Ashford, Alexis Thorpe, Josh Taylor, Peggy McCay, Frances Reid, Thaao Penghlis and Deidre Hall) all returned to their original roles. There was also another twist, the killer wasn't Marlena. Stefano DiMera's nephew, Andre (posing as Tony DiMera) had kidnapped them and made Marlena think she was killing off her friends and family. The storyline was incredibly controversial, and garnered the soap a lot of press.

=== Exit (2009) ===
Drake Hogestyn was fired in 2007 as a way to shrink down the budget. Later, in an attempt to stabilize ratings, he was brought back in 2008. As a result, it provided many storyline opportunities for the couple. However, with a vastly shrinking budget things didn't pan out as planned. Days of Our Lives was renewed in 2008, but the budget was slashed severely by 40%. To make do with the new restrictions, executive producer Ken Corday was forced to fire his two highest paid actors, Deidre Hall and Drake Hogestyn. Critics slammed the show for their firings, with TV Guide's Nelson Branco saying in an interview, "The show became uglier after Hall and Hogestyn left the airwaves. Many claim it was the beginning of the end for our industry. You’d be hard-pressed to find anyone who would disagree with that statement." Matt Mitovich said their exit was, "Truly the end of an era, as daytime television says goodbye to 'Days of Our Lives' John Black and Dr. Marlena Evans on Friday, Jan. 23. Drake Hogestyn and Deidre Hall, aka John and "Doc," have nearly 12,000 Days appearances between them over the past 32 years. As such, they will leave behind many memories for fans of NBC's long-running (and now only) sudser. The iconic couple will create another magical moment when they say goodbye to Salem and loved ones following this week's hospital bedside wedding ceremony." They made their final appearance on January 23, 2009. However, they both returned to the show on September 26, 2011, and have remained since.

== Storylines ==
=== 1976–1987 ===
Marlena Evans makes her debut in 1976 as one of Mickey Horton's psychiatrists at the University Hospital in Salem. This puts her in close contact with the soap's core family, the Hortons. This also allows her to meet her first new lover in Salem, Don Craig (Mickey's assistant). In 1977, a prominent storyline quickly started involving Marlena's jealous twin sister, Samantha (played by Hall's real life twin, Andrea Hall). Samantha impersonates Marlena, and has her institutionalized. Marlena makes a quick attempt to escape and contact Don, but Samantha catches on. Don, noticing an extreme personality difference in Marlena, starts suspecting that something is up. With the help of Laura Horton, he releases Marlena, and has Samantha arrested. He proposes to Marlena, and the two are married later that year. During this time, Marlena and Samantha make peace, and share a heartfelt reconciliation. She gives birth to a premature son, and she and Don name the child DJ. The baby dies of SIDS, which causes a rift between the couple. Don has an affair and the couple divorce soon after.

In 1981, Marlena begins spending a lot of time with Kellam Chandler. After Marlena refuses Kellam's advances toward her, he rapes her. Kellam is killed by his son Todd hours later and at the trial that followed, Marlena testifies that Kellam had raped her that night, helping Todd's case. Later that year, Marlena is given her own radio show. Marlena begins to receive threatening phone calls and letters to her and her radio show. While being stalked by the Salem Strangler, Marlena meets Detective Roman Brady, who becomes her bodyguard and then her beau. The Salem Strangler kills Samantha when he mistakes her for Marlena. Soon afterward, the Salem Strangler attacks Marlena, but is killed by Roman.

Marlena and Roman eventually become engaged, but Roman's estranged wife Anna soon arrives in Salem with their young daughter, Carrie. Anna causes trouble for Roman, but eventually grants him a divorce. Roman receives custody of Carrie, and he and Marlena are married in February 1983. The following year, shortly after she gives birth to twins Sami and Eric Brady, Roman is shot by Stefano DiMera, and is presumed dead by everyone. Marlena, who once thought that she had fatally shot Stefano, is kidnapped several times over the years.

In 1986, Marlena takes in John Black as her patient; he has amnesia and she is determined to help him recover his past. John and Marlena spend a lot of time together, and the pair fall in love. However, John seems to know a lot about Stefano, leading Marlena to suspect he is Stefano. Later, Marlena finds a plastic surgeon's file containing before and after shots of both Roman and John. Marlena becomes convinced that John is Roman, and, over time, John took on the role of Roman. Marlena is later trying to talk down a suicidal jumper when she falls from a window ledge. Marlena lays in a coma, near death for a month. When she finally recovers, she and Roman renewed their vows on August 22, 1986. In his years with the ISA, Roman worked with a man named Orpheus. Roman accidentally killed Orpheus' wife while on assignment. To get back at Roman, Orpheus kidnaps Marlena and fakes her death. Roman shoots and kills Orpheus, but before he could rescue Marlena, she is presumed to have been killed in a plane crash.

=== 1991–2009 ===
In reality, Marlena had survived the plane crash, and is in a coma. Sometime during this period, Stefano gets possession of Marlena, and hides her on an island. In the summer of 1991, she finally awakes from the coma, and makes her way back to Salem. She and Roman are reunited until another man with Roman's original face returns to Salem. The man everyone believed was Roman, from 1986 to 1991, is in fact a brainwashed victim of Stefano. The real Roman has been held captive, but he makes his way back to Salem and Marlena. She is conflicted about her feelings for Roman and his substitute, who goes back to using his self-given name, John Black. Marlena and Roman reunited.

In 1992, a jealous, crazed Stella Lombard is convinced that Marlena wants to steal her husband, Roger, and holds Marlena captive in an abandoned warehouse. John saves Marlena before the warehouse is demolished, bringing the two closer and finding it hard to deny their attraction. They eventually start having an affair, which leads to the birth of their daughter, Belle. When Belle's paternity becomes known, Roman divorces Marlena and leaves town. In 1994 as Stefano tries to make Marlena his queen of the night she becomes possessed by a demon and John being a priest at the time calls on God and Marlena is freed. By then, however, John is involved with Kristen DiMera. In 1996, Marlena is kidnapped by Stefano, who lusts over her, and is held prisoner in Paris. She would be eventually rescued, with Stefano being briefly presumed dead after being supposedly killed by his ex-lover Rachel Blake. Kristen resorts to desperate measures to keep John and Marlena apart, but her schemes are eventually exposed. John and Marlena reunite, and get engaged. They are set to marry in the summer of 1997, but before they are married, Kristen returns to Salem with Roman, who is dying from an illness. Marlena tends to him when she learns he believes she and John are not together. Once he's cured, Roman discovers the truth, and despite his efforts, Marlena and John reunite. Marlena finally marries John on July 5, 1999.

When John's teenage son Brady returns home from college, he immediately clashed with Marlena. Marlena believed that Brady was endangering Belle's life, causing a rift between her and John. Eventually, she and Brady made amends, and she and John reconciled. When the Gemini Twins, Rex and Cassie, seemingly fall from the sky, Marlena finds out she had given birth to the twins during the time she was in a coma years before. She comes to believe that she and Tony DiMera are their parents. However, it's revealed that Marlena was only their surrogate mother, and Roman and Kate Roberts are their biological parents.

When a serial killer dubbed The Salem Stalker starts wreaking havoc around town, killing many friends, including Roman, John and Marlena are worried about what could happen to them. The killer, though, is later revealed to be Marlena, though John believes she was forced to by someone else. Marlena is arrested, and sent to prison, while John tries to clear her name. Marlena tries to escape, and is killed by police fire. However, she's later found alive with all of her victims on Melaswen Island, and it's revealed she was brainwashed by Andre DiMera into committing the murders. She reunites with John, but soon after, Marlena finds out she's pregnant with Roman's child, conceived when they were stranded on the island. During an argument between John and Roman, Marlena falls down the stairs and miscarries. She wakes up with amnesia, as a result of the miscarriage. Amnesiac specialist Alex North is brought in to care for Marlena, and she appears to fall in love with him. Alex later reveals that he is Marlena's first husband, and was presumed dead in Vietnam. Since Alex and Marlena's marriage has never been dissolved, Marlena's subsequent marriages are all invalid. Suspicious, John investigates, and finds out that Alex is an abusive husband. John uncovers that Alex is planning to kill Marlena. By the time that Alex is proven to be a fraud, he and Marlena have renewed their vows, and left on a honeymoon. Alex takes Marlena to Morgan Island, but John soon finds them and, after a shootout and scuffle, Alex falls over a cliff and is presumed dead.

When Steve and Kayla Johnson are poisoned, Marlena and John fly to Canada to get a drug that might help them. When their plane began to lose altitude, Marlena agrees to jump from the plane, and is rescued by Smokey Robinson, who helps her reconnect with John. The couple go to Italy to investigate the DiMera family after hearing that Stefano might be alive. After renewing their wedding vows, they find Stefano, who appears to be dying. When he gives John the Death tarot card, Marlena makes him promise not to get involved with the DiMera troubles again. John, however, decides to help Roman stake-out EJ DiMera, who puts John in a coma after shooting him.

Marlena joins the hunt for the reasons behind the Brady/DiMera feud, while keeping John on life support. John then comes out of his coma, and helps Marlena and the others on their quest. John is hit by a car, and seemingly dies on October 17, 2007. As is often the case in Salem, characters rarely die. On January 8, 2008, EJ discovers John in the basement of the DiMera mansion, being programmed by Stefano to become a super soldier. After he is discovered by the police, John wakes up with amnesia, and Marlena struggles to help John remember. It is discovered that John is the child of Shawn Brady's sister Colleen, and Stefano's father, Santo DiMera. Their affair and its disastrous ending was the beginning of the feud. John's obesession with his DiMera heritage and his changed personality both start to take a toll on Marlena, and she finds it hard to stay with John. Stefano wakes up from a coma (after Marlena purposely sends him into a comatose state in January 2008), and intends on getting revenge on Marlena and taking the DiMera empire back from John. He causes Marlena to fall into a coma the exact way she did to him. However, Marlena wakes up after receiving a ghostly visit from her late sister, Samantha. John relinquishes his control of the empire to Stefano, but Marlena, by then, decides to move on with her life and files for divorce.

John begins seeing Dr. Charlotte Taylor to regain his memories. Charlotte is the daughter of Marlena's mentor, but it doesn't take long for Marlena to see that something was off about Charlotte. When Brady returns to town, he helps Marlena discover that John is remembering, but Charlotte is actually keeping him in the dark. Charlotte comes to Marlena's apartment and tries to kill her, and explains that she is jealous of her because of how her father seemed to favor Marlena over Charlotte. However, John bursts in at the last minute, and ends up getting attacked by Charlotte. Charlotte is arrested while John is rushed to the hospital. He wakes up with his memory restored. Marlena finds out that John is paralyzed, but he can be treated at a clinic in Switzerland. John and Marlena reunite, get remarried, and head off to Switzerland to treat John's paralysis on January 23, 2009.

=== 2011–present ===
In September 2011, John and Marlena return to Salem as special guests for the opening of the Horton Town Square. John surprised his friends and family by revealing that he is able to walk again. Moments later, John is arrested for embezzling millions of dollars in retirement money and pensions from his company Basic Black. John and Marlena hire Carrie to be John's defense lawyer, and she and Rafe Hernandez work together to prove John's innocence. They succeed in finding the evidence that proves John was framed, and get him released. However, soon after, Marlena and John discover their marriage is invalid, because John is married to Hope, as a result of Stefano's brainwashing. They plan to travel abroad to divorce, but Marlena is forced to stay back. John is able to get the divorce, and return home to Marlena. They soon have a new problem to deal with when Kristen returns to town, claiming she is now reformed after therapy. Marlena is suspicious, especially after she starts dating Brady. John and Marlena's marriage becomes strained, as a result, as John tries to protect his son. Marlena succeeds in breaking up Kristen and Brady's engagement, enraging Kristen. However, she finds out that John intentionally tried to seduce Kristen in an attempt to get Brady to break up with her, and the two file for divorce.

Brady gives Kristen a second chance when he finds out she stopped John's attempt to seduce her, but when Marlena overhears Kristen say she slept with another man while separated from Brady, she aims to find out what Kristen is up to. With the help of Nicole Walker, Marlena is able to find a flash drive in Kristen's possession that could reveal her crimes. Kristen finds out, though, and has thugs beat Marlena up to get the drive back. She's unsuccessful, and Marlena is later able to recover it. The drive is encrypted, though, and she asks for the help of Victor Kiriakis to decode it. He's able to open the drive, and tells her that it's proof Kristen slept with another man. He convinces Marlena to play it at Brady and Kristen's wedding ceremony. Marlena discovers, though, along with the rest of the congregation, that the man in the video is her son Eric, who was drugged and raped by Kristen as revenge against Marlena. Marlena had to try to repair her relationship with both Brady and Eric. Marlena got caught up in the drama surrounding her children's lives, as Eric decided to leave his priesthood and pursue a relationship with Nicole, and Sami was accused of murder.

Marlena reconciled with John after he was hit over the head and left in a coma. At the same time, Kristen was arrested for what she did to Eric. She told Marlena that she could give John a cure if the charges against her were dropped. Making a deal with the devil, Marlena convinced Eric to drop his testimony against Kristen, and get her released. John received the cure, and woke up from his coma. Marlena soon started counseling baseball player Paul Narita, who was struggling with being gay. She later was caught in the middle when Paul admitted to sleeping with Marlena's grandson Will Horton, even though he was married to Sonny Kiriakis. To make matters worse, John found out that Paul was his son. Marlena was at odds with John, in an attempt to protect her grandson. Will enlisted Marlena's help, wanting Paul to leave him and Sonny alone. In an attempt to help Will, Marlena ended up heading to Italy by accident, and found Kristen. The two ended up in a struggle, and Kristen fell out of a window; she was presumed dead. Marlena returned home, but was soon captured by Stefano, who wanted revenge for Kristen's death. He planned to kill Marlena in Italy, but she was saved at the last second by Stefano's son, Chad. Marlena returned home to John and her family. In 2021, Marlena is repossessed by Satan, intent on getting deadly revenge on Salem.

== Reception ==
The Marlena Evans doll

At the time of Deidre Hall's 2009 departure from the serial, Marlena was the fourth longest running Days of Our Lives character. Her outrageous storylines and long suffering nature have led her to be labeled a soap legend and television icon. She is widely known even outside of the Days of Our Lives viewer base. The character is a legend, and is known for reinventing the genre by adding a supernatural mix.

Deidre Hall has won many awards for her portrayal of Marlena. These include two Best Actress Soapy Awards in 1982 and 1983. She has also won three Soap Opera Digest Awards for Outstanding Lead Actress in 1984, 1985 and 1995. Deidre was the first recipient of the Soap Opera Digest Award for Outstanding Contribution Award by a Lead Actress/Actor in 1986. Hall also received an award with Drake Hogestyn in 2005 for "Favorite Couple: John and Marlena". Deidre was twice voted Best Actress by the Soap Opera Update Awards in 1994 and 1995. She has been nominated for a Daytime Emmy in 1980, 1984, and 1985. She has, however, never won an Emmy.

As a special treat in 2007, SoapNet rebroadcast Marlena's possession for Halloween.

In 2020, Charlie Mason from Soaps She Knows put Marlena at first place on his list of the 35 most memorable characters from Days of Our Lives, saying "Thanks to a combo platter of Deidre Hall’s unforgettable performances, unpredictable writing and an enviable array of love interests, viewers have been tuning in since 1976 to find out, ahem, what’s up, Doc?". In 2024, Mason included Marlena in his list of the best mothers in American soap operas, writing that is a "good thing Sami and Eric's mom is a shrink; otherwise, she might have long ago gone mad trying to curb her daughter's tendency to act on impulse and her son's "here today, gone tomorrow" approach to his priest's collar." Mason also placed Marlena fourth on his ranked list of Soaps' 40 Most Iconic Characters of All Time, commenting, "Eat your heart out, Frasier Crane. Deidre Hall's indefatigable Doc is the shrink whose following keeps growing along with the list of travails she's endured".

== See also ==
- John Black and Marlena Evans
- Supercouple
