= Sami Brady =

- Days of Our Lives character
- Alison Sweeney as Sami Brady
- Portrayed by: Ronit Aranoff (1984); Lauren Bundy (1984–1985); Jessica Davis (1985–1986); Tiffany Palma (1986); Ashleigh Sterling (1986–1990); Christina Wagoner (1990–1992); Alison Sweeney (1993–present); Dan Wells (2005, 2021)
- Duration: 1984–2015; 2017–2022; 2025
- First appearance: October 16, 1984
- Created by: Margaret DePriest, Sheri Anderson, and Thom Racina
- Introduced by: Betty Corday and Al Rabin
- Spin-off appearances: Days of Our Lives: Night Sins (1993); Days of Our Lives: A Very Salem Christmas (2021)
In-universe information
- Other names: Samantha Brady; Sami Reed; Sami Walker; Sami Roberts; Sami Hernandez; Sami DiMera; Stan Dunn (male alter ego); Colleen (witness protection)
- Occupation: Businesswoman; Receptionist; Director of Imaging; Film consultant
- Parents: Roman Brady; Marlena Evans
- Stepparents: Kate Roberts; John Black
- Siblings: Eric Brady
- Half-brothers: DJ Craig; Rex Brady
- Half-sisters: Carrie Brady; Cassie Brady; Belle Black
- Spouse: Austin Reed (1996–1997); Brandon Walker (2003–2005) (Note: As Sami and Lucas were about to marry, Kate brought Brandon back to town to reveal that Brandon and Sami's annulment papers were never properly filed. The annulment was finalized in January 2005.); Lucas Horton (2007); EJ DiMera (2007–2008, 2014–2022); Rafe Hernandez (2010–2012)
- Children: Will Horton; Allie Horton; Johnny DiMera; Sydney DiMera; Grace Brady (legal)
- Grandchildren: Arianna Horton; Henry Horton; Trey DiMera (adoptive); Olivia DiMera
- Grandparents: Shawn Brady; Caroline Brady; Frank Evans; Martha Evans
- Aunts and uncles: Kimberly Brady; Kayla Brady; Bo Brady; Frankie Brady (adoptive); Max Brady (adoptive); Samantha Evans
- Nieces and nephews: Noah Reed; Claire Brady; Emily Lockhart; Mackenzie Horton
- First cousins: Andrew Donovan; Theresa Donovan; Stephanie Johnson; Joey Johnson; Shawn-Douglas Brady; Chelsea Brady; Zack Brady; Ciara Brady

Sami Brady is a fictional character from Days of Our Lives, an American soap opera on the Peacock streaming service, portrayed by Alison Sweeney since 1993. The character is first seen as a newborn baby in the episode of October 16, 1984, in which mom Marlena Evans (Deidre Hall) gives birth to her and her twin brother Eric Brady. Initially played by a series of child actresses, Sweeney took over the role of Sami when the character was rapidly-aged from a pre-teen to a teenager, in January 1993, under the pen of head writers Sheri Anderson and James E. Reilly.

Sami is known for her trouble-making ways in pursuit of what she wants, her turbulent relationships with men, and fighting for her children. She has been described as vindictive and the girl "you love to hate", but like as she is "so over the top." Sami has been part of two daytime supercouples: with Lucas Horton (Bryan Dattilo), and EJ DiMera (James Scott); and is the mother of LGBT character, Will Horton.

Sweeney won a Special Fan Award for "America's Favorite Villain" at the 2002 Daytime Emmy Awards; and in 2015 she was nominated for Daytime Emmy Award for Outstanding Lead Actress in a Drama Series.

== Casting ==
Seven child actors portrayed Sami. Baby Ronit Arnoff initially represented Sami; and babies Lauren Ann Bundy (October 22, 1984 to April 10, 1985) and Jessica Davis (December 6, 1985 to May 20, 1986) followed. Sami was rapidly-aged about two years when Tiffany Nicole Palma (August 7 to September 9, 1986) stepped in to play Sami. Ashleigh Sterling became the first child actress to play Sami over an extended period (December 24, 1986 to June 5, 1990), followed by Christina Wagoner (August 10, 1990 to June 22, 1992). Finally the current actress Alison Sweeney took over the role of Sami as a teenager on January 22, 1993, and played her into adulthood. Sweeney has been portraying Sami for over twenty-one years. When Sweeney took maternity leave in 2005, Sami stayed on the show; Days achieved this by having Sami go under-cover, disguising herself as a man named Stan played by actor Dan Wells. Sweeney and Sami departed the show in 2014, but Sweeney has returned since for short-term appearances.

Sami was not Sweeney's first role on the show; she had previously portrayed Adrienne Johnson as a child in 1987. Sweeney has talked about starting on the show as Sami: "I remember my first day at work. I was so excited to be a part of a show that I'd been a fan of [...] My first two weeks on the show I was sneaking around Salem, so there weren't a lot of lines to memorize. My first scene was with Wayne Northrop (then-Roman Brady), who pulled a gun on me and said something like 'Freeze or I'll shoot!'" Sweeney has cited Northrop, Deidre Hall (Marlena), and Drake Hogestyn (John) as influences on her career playing the role, stating: "I learned so many lessons from them".

When her 20th anniversary as Sami was approaching, fans speculated that she might depart from the series, but Sweeney inked a new deal with the show. She said, "I am super-excited to stay, and I am so honored that they asked me to stay. The job continues to surprise and challenge me. I have already shot my 20th anniversary episode, which airs on January 6 [2013], so I had this huge milestone and it has been such an amazing journey. I love my job, I love the people I work with and I love Sami." In January 2014, Sweeney announced she was quitting the series after 21 years. She revealed on The Ellen DeGeneres Show, "I've been on Days of Our Lives for 21 years. I'm celebrating my 21st year and I decided that it's going to be my last year with the show," Sweeney announced. "I've been on Days of Our Lives since I was 16-years-old, and I have never had more than a two-week vacation in that whole time. It's awesome. I love Sami, I love Salem, I love my job, I love daytime, I love the fans—I love everything about it." Her departing episode aired October 30, 2014.

In 2015, Sweeney returned to Days of Our Lives to be part of the soap's 50th anniversary celebration (appearing from October 12 to November 17); and in 2017, she again returned as Sami as a key-player in the story of Sami's apparently-dead son Will Horton, being found alive (airing from October 13 to December 14). Then in March 2018 it was announced that Sweeney would again be returning as Sami. Sweeney teased the new story, saying it is: "super exciting, definitely a roller-coaster ride and really fun." Sami featured from August 23 to November 8, 2018. Sweeney returned in June 2019 for the passing of Caroline Brady (Peggy McCay), airing from June 18 to 24, 2019. In December 2019, Sweeney announced she would again reprise the role, which she did beginning on July 14, 2020.

In August 2020, it was announced that Sweeney had signed a one-year deal with the soap. On May 7, 2021, Wells returned to the role for one episode when Sami once again masqueraded as Stan.

On August 6, 2024, TV Insider announced Sweeney would return for limited run; Sami returned on April 10, 2025.

== Development ==
=== Characterization ===
Since Sweeney has stepped into the role, Sami has been showcased as the series' primary troublemaker and "the girl you loved to hate" through her lying and scheming. In recent years, Sweeney has established herself as a leading heroine, with the show centering on the popular and controversial relationships between Sami and her love interests Austin Reed (Patrick Muldoon & Austin Peck), Franco Kelly (Victor Alfieri), Brandon Walker (Matt Cedeno), Lucas Roberts (Bryan Dattilo), EJ DiMera (James Scott), and Rafe Hernandez (Galen Gering). Originally characterized as the iron-willed daughter of Dr. Marlena Evans, Sami was transformed by writer James E. Reilly in the summer of 1994, converting the character from a stubborn moody teenager to a "conniving bitch", having her kidnap her baby sister, Belle and break up supercouple Carrie Brady and Austin Reed, including blackmailing Nicole Walker and Lexie Carver on numerous incidents. However, as ratings declined in the mid-2000s, Sami's storylines proved to be "worn out" and in 2006, new Days head writers Hogan Sheffer and Meg Kelly converted the character to a heroine by pairing her with EJ DiMera and later Rafe Hernandez. Recently, in 2013 head writers Christopher Whitesell and Gary Tomlin turned Sami back into a scheming vixen. With her son Will being tormented by Nick Fallon and her fiancé, EJ DiMera sleeping with Abigail Deveraux, Sami returned to her evil ways and culminated in her committing crimes such as planning revenge towards Abby and EJ for their affair and convincing Adrienne that her husband, Justin the father in law of her son, Will, was having an affair. The character has been described as "vindictive"; a writer from the American newspaper Asbury Park Press wrote that: "she's so bad, she's good". According to Austin American-Statesman in 1996, Sweeney had talked about "longing to play a conniving troublemaker" and she got her wish and more. Sweeney stated: "It's kind of funny that I said that [sic] I had no idea that (the writers) would take me literally". Sweeney has said to have given a new word to "manipulative" during her portrayal of Sami. In 2005, Sami manipulatively created a male alter ego, Stan. During this period of time, from February to August, Dan Wells took over the role. Sami is known for her rivalry with Nicole Walker (Arianne Zucker) and Sweeney has said that Sami has never had "female friends".

=== Relationships ===
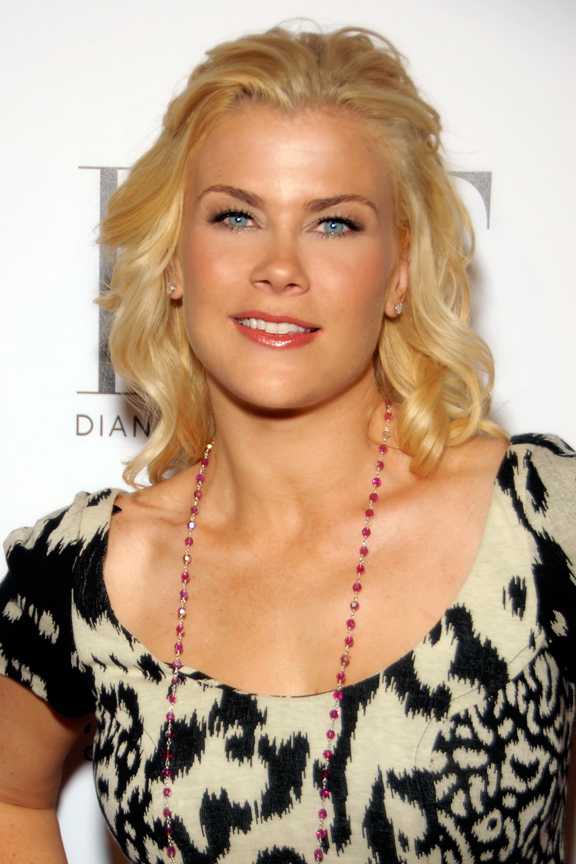
Alison Sweeney (pictured) said that she has enjoyed watching Sami grow and change.

Sami is known for her relationships, and many "failed trips to the altar". Janet Di Lauro of About.com said "No matter, Sami's always been a character who's fun to watch and root for as she's searched for her soul mate, time and time again." As a teenager, she developed a crush on Austin Reed (Austin Peck), but was "devastated" when he began dating her sister Carrie Brady (Christie Clark). She worked with Austin's brother Lucas to break up the couple. She ended up having a one night stand with Lucas in early 1995. Di Lauro said Sami's most "diabolical plot" was drugging Austin to have sex with her, which was "the start of an elaborate scheme" where she ended up pregnant and named Austin as the father, although Lucas was the actual father. The truth was eventually revealed and Austin, after nearly marrying Sami without loving her, reunited with Carrie.

A bitter custody battle ensued between Lucas and Sami, who had a "love/hate" relationship over the years. Of the pairing, Sweeney said "their past is such a deep relationship and ultimately a friendship and a trust that they have with each other." They ended up marrying, but it was "permanently ended" when EJ DiMera (James Scott) entered the picture. EJ, the son of longtime crime boss Stefano DiMera (Joseph Mascolo), developed an obsession with Sami, and ended up controversially "raping" her. Sami became pregnant and gave birth to twins; her daughter's father is Lucas, and son's paternity belonged to EJ. EJ had asked Sami for sex to save Lucas' life, while he was trapped and nearly died. This led to a sham wedding between EJ and Sami, in exchange for the DiMeras ending the fifty-year family feud between the Brady family. Although she initially hated him, the couple ended up in a "night of passion" resulting in another pregnancy. Of whether EJ or Lucas was Sami's "true love," Sweeney said "I personally think Sami and Lucas truly love each other, but obviously a lot has gone on between them that has pushed them apart. Right now, they are writing Sami more focusing on EJ." She also said that she enjoyed working with Scott, and called him "enchanting." Of working with Dattilo, Sweeney said "I am definitely a long-standing Lumi fan and I miss working with Bryan every day. He is so fun! I was in a scene the other day and looking around, like he and I have such a history together, for some inside joke and he wasn't on the set. It's just strange when I don't get to work with him all the time."

"16 years later, I think Sami had been through a lot of crazy stuff, to say the least. I would love to see her in new and different scenes."

— Sweeney on Sami's storylines (2008)

TV Guide's Nelson Branco named Lucas and Sami one of soap's greatest supercouples, and said "For years all this couple could think of was breaking up Austin and Carrie, until one magical day, partners-in-crime and cohorts Sami and Lucas realized they were in love with each other! Now as Days’ reigning super couple, they face the evil wrath of EJ and his family, The DiMeras. Will Sami marry EJ, the man who raped her to end this family feud forever — and will Lucas be able to forgive her?" Despite this, the couple divorced and despite minor reunions since, have not been a couple. James Scott said "They're not really re-visiting it. They have never done it. I think it's about time, frankly. There is a good opportunity for story there. Alison Sweeney (Sami) and I work very well together. It's sort of a fairy tale. They don't play it so much now, but the Bradys and the DiMeras have a history." Scott also noted that EJ and Sami "love each other" but not necessarily in a romantic way. On-Air On-Soaps said "legions of fans are waiting for their beloved EJami duo to finally start a full-blown romance ... something that has been teased, and teased, and teased for years." He romances with Lucas and EJ have been popular with viewers, who call the pairings 'Lumi' and 'Ejami.'

Upon Lucas' return to Days of our Lives in 2012, a poll ran by Soap Opera Digest revealed that majority of fans wanted Lucas and Sami back together. While in the Witness Protection Program while pregnant with her second child with EJ, Sami fell in love with her body guard Rafe. When asked who out of Lucas, EJ or Rafe should be with Sami, Sweeney said "You can't ask that," because "that is one topic I am now scared to talk about because you say one thing and the fans get all kinds of crazy on you." She said that it is so interesting to see how Sami has "grown and changed" and feels that the "relationship with Rafe is definitely a different one from the way she's been in the past." Fans refer to Sami and Rafe as 'Safe'. Sweeney said that it has been fun getting "to know Galen" and said "We have fun working together, and it's nice. It's a new, different storyline for Sami."

=== Children ===
Sami is mother to Will Horton, Johnny DiMera, Allie Horton, Sydney DiMera, and Grace Brady (who Sami believed was her biological daughter). Janet Di Lauro of About.com said, "While Sami wouldn't exactly be called lucky at love, let's face it, most of her couplings have been wildly dysfunctional, her romances have produced four beautiful children: Will, Allie, Johnny and Sydney." Sami is known for fiercely fighting for her children. Sweeney told an interviewer: "For almost my entire run on Days, Sami's overarching story was all about Will. She would lie for him, kill for him [figuratively speaking]. Her fights over that kid were huge! She was always Mama Bear ...."

By 2009, Will was 16 years old; Sweeney said, "It's sort of overwhelming to me sometimes to realize my character has a sixteen-year-old," considering she started working on Days of our Lives at 16, but she enjoys the dynamics between Will and Sami. In 2012, Sami and Lucas' son Will came out as gay. While Lucas was accepting, Sami was initially "responsible for the other point of view," according to Dattilo. Sweeney said that viewers can expect Sami to "have a traditional Sami reaction," because it is "such a vulnerable moment." Sweeney explained that Sami thinks it is because of her, and "she has to sort through all of those feelings and talk to lots of people in Salem about it." She added, "Sami loves her son so much, but she just always seems to say the wrong thing. She always puts her foot in her mouth."

== Storylines ==
Samantha Gene Brady is born on October 16, 1984 (changed to October 16, 1977 when the character was rapidly-aged) with her twin brother Eric Brady to Marlena Evans and Roman Brady. Sami is named after her deceased aunt, Samantha Evans and Marlena's best friend, Eugene Bradford. A feud between the Brady family and the powerful DiMera family puts the infants in danger. Roman sends them to live in Colorado after their mother's disappearance. In 1993, Sami reappears in Salem as a teenager. She develops a crush on her sister's boyfriend, Austin Reed (Patrick Muldoon). She is traumatized after seeing her mother having sex with John Black (Drake Hogestyn) which leads to an affair that results in the birth of Sami's sister, Belle. At the time, Marlena was "married" to Roman. Sami's mental health spirals downward, and she becomes a bulimic in an attempt to lose weight. Sami later tells Marlena that she witnessed her having sex with John. Knowing that she is John's child, Sami, who volunteers at the Salem Hospital, switches Belle's blood test. She then kidnaps Belle and places her on the black market. John rescues Belle on Christmas Eve. On Belle's christening, Stefano DiMera (Joseph Mascolo) shows Roman Sami's diary which reveals the affair and Belle's paternity. Roman leaves Marlena, devastating Sami.

Sami befriends Lucas Roberts (Bryan Dattilo) and dates his friend Alan Harris (Paul Kersey), whom her family strongly opposes. Sami's best friend Jamie overhears Alan talk about being in love with Carrie, but keeps this from Sami. Frustrated by his unrequited love for Carrie, Alan rapes Sami. Sami confides in Lucas, but without corroborating proof, the press vilifies Sami as a liar once the news gets out. Alan tries to rape her again, and she stops him by shooting him in the groin. Distraught, Lucas manages to comfort Sami; and they have sex. She still, however, has a crush on Austin and drugs him into bed so he would believe she was Carrie. After her divorce from Roman, Marlena becomes vulnerable and is possessed by the devil. While possessed, Marlena tells Sami to seduce Austin. She tries, but Austin rejects her. Sami leaves town in February 1995.

Sami returns in July of that year and crashes Austin's wedding to Carrie claiming that she is carrying his child. After a rough teen pregnancy, Sami gives birth to William Robert Reed on November 16, 1995. Sami hides the fact that Will is actually Lucas' son, and passes him off as Austin's. Austin and Sami are engaged and plan to wed. However, he leaves her at the altar after Carrie uncovers the truth about Will's paternity. Sami renames her son William Reed Roberts and leaves town. She returns and befriends Franco Kelly (Victor Alfieri). They become engaged; Franco is using her to get a greencard and stay in the country. He is murdered on their wedding day. Sami sees the body and faints near it. Lucas's mother Kate Roberts (Lauren Koslow) frames Sami for the murder so that she will go to jail and Lucas can have full custody of Will. Sami is convicted and sentenced to death for the murder. In the middle of her execution via injection, Lucas confesses to the murder in an attempt to save her life. Unbeknownst to Lucas, Roberto signed a false confession on his death bed which leads to a stay of execution from the governor. Sami is freed and falls in love with Brandon Walker (Matt Cedeno), who helps her regain full custody of Will. Brandon and Sami are married briefly. However, her lies and schemes end the marriage. Sami has an accident at the DiMera mansion and falls through the window. Lucas helps her recover and they fall in love. They become engaged, much to Kate's chagrin. Kate drugs Sami and places her in Brandon's bed the night before her marriage to Lucas in a bid to end the engagement. Lucas leaves Sami.

Sami's sorely compromised psychological state deteriorates to such a degree that Sami begins to work for Tony DiMera (Thaao Penghlis), disguises herself as a man using an assumed name, "Stan", and sells illicit drugs to a pain-wracked John Black, all out of a base-born, suppositious need for revenge. Attempting to redeem herself, Sami convinces Lucas that Kate had set her up; that she was never unfaithful. The two reunite and agree to marry once again.

Lucas believes that Sami has changed for the better, but Kate reveals Sami's misdeeds as "Stan," and Lucas calls off the wedding. Austin Reed returns to Salem and befriends Sami. Carrie Brady also returns after ending her relationship with Mike Horton. Lucas and Austin, now business rivals, attempt to buy out Carrie's company. Lucas backs out, finding out that Carrie runs the entire company, and that once again, Sami manipulated him. Austin and Carrie fall back in love and plan their future together when Carrie learns that Austin's company has taken over Highstyle. Carrie dates Lucas on the rebound. Austin does the same with Sami, and both couples become engaged.

Sami's relationship to Austin is tested however, when EJ Wells (James Scott), an English race car driver, moves into the apartment next to theirs. When Sami and Austin's wedding ends in disaster, EJ and Sami kiss for the first time. Carrie ends her relationship with Lucas and remarries Austin before they both leave Salem. Sami turns to EJ, and the two begin dating. Sami then discovers that not only is he sleeping with Kate but that he is also Stefano's son. Sami and Lucas rekindle their love in spite of Kate, and the two decide to take a road trip. Their car breaks down in a snow storm, and they seek shelter in an abandoned cabin where they make love. Weighed down by snow, the crumbling ceiling caves in. Lucas is trapped, Sami runs to get help, meets up with EJ in a snow drift, and asks him to help her. Revealing himself as a true DiMera, EJ agrees to help Sami only if she has sex with him. In subsequent weeks, EJ continues to taunt Sami with reminders of the deal they made that night. Sami tells Lucas about her pregnancy and they get married; the night of their wedding, he learns about EJ raping her. Her pregnancy is full of speculation about who the father of her unborn twins were. She later gives birth to: John "Johnny" Roman Roberts (later legally changed to John Roman DiMera) and Alice "Allie" Caroline Horton. It was revealed after a paternity test that EJ was Johnny's father and Allie was Lucas' daughter. Sami makes the painful decision to end her marriage to Lucas and marry EJ to end the Brady-DiMera feud. At her wedding to EJ, Lucas, Marlena and Kate attempt to shoot EJ Lucas is arrested and sent to prison, and Will leaves for Switzerland. It is later revealed that Will was the actual shooter and Lucas went to prison to protect his son.

EJ tries to take custody of Johnny. But immigration wants to deport EJ, and Sami helps him by moving into the DiMera mansion with Johnny to show to immigration that they are a happily married couple. They have sex, and Lucas, released on house arrest, sees them at it. Although Sami ends her marriage to E.J., Lucas does not forgive her. EJ moves on to Nicole Walker (Arianne Zucker), and Sami finds out she is pregnant again. She does not tell E.J., and after witnessing a murder, she goes into witness protection. She befriends her guard, Rafe Hernandez (Galen Gering), and gives birth to a daughter. Nicole miscarries E.J.'s child but pretends to still be pregnant and secretly illegally adopts a baby girl to pass off to EJ as their own. Nicole then finds out that Sami's baby daughter is actually EJ's and she secretly switches the two baby girls, so that EJ will be raising a child that is biologically his. Nicole's switch works and she begins raising Sami's child, Sydney DiMera, as her own. Sami is in love with Rafe, and together they raise the baby, named Grace, believing Sami gave birth to her. Grace contracts meningitis and dies, and Sami confesses to EJ that Grace was "his", and EJ is furious. Eventually, the baby switch is revealed and Sami is reunited with Sydney. But for revenge against Sami, E.J. kidnaps Sydney and makes everyone think she is dead. But he falls back in love with Sami and returns Sydney to her, pretending to be the hero. EJ and Sami reconnect, and after her relationship with Rafe ends, she becomes engaged to EJ However, at the wedding, Rafe presents evidence to Sami that E.J. was behind Sydney's kidnapping. She leaves EJ for Rafe, and discovers that he had a plan to kidnap both his children and take them away forever. To stop him, she shoots him in the head. Rafe proposes to her while EJ narrowly escapes death. He later wins full custody of the children and Sami marries Rafe. Johnny is diagnosed with eye cancer and she regains joint custody. After allowing Johnny and Sydney back into their mother's life, Stefano and EJ switch Rafe with an impostor whose face they surgically alter so he can pose as Rafe's double.

The DiMeras' schemes are eventually revealed, and after some months, the real Rafe is reunited with Sami. During a family get-together, Johnny goes missing and Sami rushes to the DiMera mansion insisting that EJ has him. They see in a news report that Johnny has "died" and in their grief, have sex. However, the news report turns out to be false and Johnny is found alive and well. Will is angry with his mom for being unfaithful to Rafe, and when Rafe finds out about it Sami's marriage to Rafe ends. Lucas returns to town and Sami and Lucas reconnect. They are taken aback when Will reveals to them that he is gay. Sami initially runs out on Will, but she soon comes round to support him. Stefano is apparently murdered, and EJ is held responsible, and Sami decides to help prove his innocence, much to Lucas's dismay. Sami's reunion with Lucas ends. Stefano is revealed to be alive, and EJ is cleared for murder.

Sami starts to feel torn between EJ and Rafe. Rafe and Sami agree to give their relationship a second chance. Sami plans Gabi Hernandez (Camila Banus) and Nick Fallon's (Blake Berris) wedding, wanting to tell EJ her decision after the wedding. However, during the wedding, it is revealed that Nick is not the father of Gabi's unborn baby – Will is. Sami is furious with Gabi, and Rafe defends his sister, insulting Will in the process. Sami is furious and breaks up with Rafe. Sami eventually tells EJ about Rafe and her plan to leave him. EJ forgives her, and they reunite. Nick demands Will sign away his paternal rights to the baby. When Sami, Lucas, and EJ try to stop him, Nick reveals that he knows Will was responsible for shooting E.J. in 2007. Will signs away his rights to avoid being prosecuted, and Sami is devastated. She and E.J. team up to stop Nick's blackmail of Will. When Stefano returns, Sami and EJ decide to get his help to destroy evidence the police has against Will. Sami and E.J. stay together through the situation, and become engaged in April 2013.

Soon after, Rafe is attacked, and ends up in a coma. Initially, the police suspect EJ, as does Sami, but she eventually realizes his innocence. The real attacker, Jensen, is revealed to be targeting Nick. He kidnaps Nick and Gabi, and ends up shooting Will when he tries to rescue Nick. Sami comes to the hospital and finds out Gabi's baby was born; she meets her granddaughter, Arianna Grace, for the first time. Sami visits Rafe while in the hospital, and while there, sees a man come in with a knife about to kill Rafe. Sami shoots him to protect Rafe. EJ tries to calm her down, while Roman and the police search for the missing knife. Sami and EJ realize the man she shot was a police officer who was working for Stefano; the officer dies after surgery, and the knife is never recovered. Sami is arrested for murder by Roman. Once exonerated, Sami and E.J. marry, only for EJ to be arrested for tax fraud; Sami confronts both E.J. and Abigail Deveraux (Kate Mansi) for the affair the pair had behind her back, and uses her power to take DiMera Enterprises away from the DiMera family with Kate. Sami begins to forgive and re-trust EJ and they re-unite, but EJ is shot in the Salem park, and Sami finds him just before he dies. It is October 2014, and Sami, overcome with grief, accepts a movie deal with Hollywood executives to build a story about her life, with Will penning the screenplay, and she and the children relocate to Los Angeles. When Will is fired from the movie, he goes back to Salem where, in October 2015, he is apparently murdered by Abigail's new fiancé, Ben Weston. Sami comes back to Salem to mourn Will. Whilst in Salem she discovers that Ben's father Clyde was the one who had gotten EJ shot, and she also finds a letter from EJ which leads her to believe EJ might be alive. The letter contains instructions which lead Sami to a safe deposit box containing the passwords to Stefano's bank account, but she is kidnapped by Stefano's son Andre DiMera who wants the passwords from her. Sami escapes and she steals Stefano's fortune. She takes the kids around Europe as she pursues clues that EJ may still be alive. In October 2017 she learns that Ben Weston has escaped from custody, and is claiming that Will is alive, and Sami once again returns to Salem to find out the truth.

== Reception ==
Sweeney's portrayal of "Salem's resident bad girl" has earned her various fan awards during her run, including a Special Fan Award for "America's Favorite Villain" at the 2002 Daytime Emmy Award ceremony; she has won multiple Soap Opera Digest Awards: "Best Youth Actress in a Soap Opera" (1994), "Best Performance in a Daytime Drama — Young Actress" (1997), and three wins for "Outstanding Villainess" (1996, 1998 and 1999). In 2015, Sweeney earned a nomination for the Daytime Emmy Award for Outstanding Lead Actress in a Drama Series (in the 42nd Daytime Emmy Awards) for her portrayal of Sami.

In 2020, Charlie Mason from Soaps She Knows placed Sami fourth place on the list of the 35 most memorable characters from Days of Our Lives, commenting "So infamous a scheme queen is Alison Sweeney's impetuous troublemaker — and, just ask half-sister Carrie, deservedly so — it's hard to fathom that a plot was ever hatched in Salem without her".

== See also ==
- Lucas and Sami
- EJ and Sami
- Supercouple
- List of soap opera villains
