= John Black and Marlena Evans =

- Drake Hogestyn and Deidre Hall as John and Marlena
- Duration: 1986–87, 1991–
- Introduced by: Betty Corday, Ken Corday and Al Rabin
In-universe information
- Other names: Jarlena, Jolena
- Spouse: 1986–91, 1999–2005, 2006–08, 2009–12, 2013–14, 2018–2025
- Daughters: Belle Black
- Granddaughters: Claire Brady

John Black and Marlena Evans are fictional characters and a supercouple from the American daytime drama Days of Our Lives. John is portrayed by Drake Hogestyn and Marlena is portrayed by Deidre Hall. In magazines and in advertising, as well as on Internet message boards, the couple is often referred to by the portmanteau "Jarlena" (for John and Marlena) or "Jolena" (for John and Marlena).

== Storylines ==
John and Marlena became a supercouple in 1986 on the American soap opera Days of our Lives. Drake Hogestyn (John Black) joined the show that year and his chemistry with Deidre Hall (Marlena Evans) was undeniable. At the time, Hogestyn's character was an amnesiac named John Black. However, information (later revealed to be false) suggested that he was really Roman Brady, Marlena's husband who was presumed dead, with extensive plastic surgery to explain the difference in appearance between the old Roman and John Black. John (as Roman) and Marlena were then married until she "died" in a plane crash in 1987. The pair's romance in the 1980s was short-lived, but it left an indelible mark on Days of Our Lives fans and the soap opera world.

In 1991, Hall returned to Days of our Lives, and returned to her role as Dr. Marlena Evans. It was revealed that Marlena's supposed death in the plane crash was not true and Marlena had spent the previous four years in a coma. Soon afterwards, Wayne Northrop, the original portrayer of Roman, also returned to the show. In a stunning turn of events, Drake Hogestyn remained on the show, and the story was retconned; his character was revealed to be an impostor programmed with the memories of the real Roman Brady. As a result, the fake Roman reverted to the name John Black. John still ended up becoming friends with Roman, and remained a part of his and Marlena's lives. Marlena and Roman reunited, while John married Isabella Toscano. Isabella died shortly after, and Marlena consoled a grief-stricken John. John saved Marlena when she was kidnapped by Stella Lombard, and left for dead in a demolished warehouse. Their feelings for each other started to resurface after this. John was afraid of hurting Marlena and Roman, and decided to leave town to avoid acting on his feelings. Marlena boarded his private jet, though, and the two gave into their feelings, sharing a night of passion. The two embarked on a passionate and torrid affair, which was discovered by Marlena and Roman's daughter, Sami Brady.

Marlena later found out she was pregnant, and John asked for a blood test to determine the paternity, which said he was not the father. When Marlena went into labor, John delivered her baby girl, Belle. When Belle was kidnapped, John rescued her from Sami, who tried to sell her on the black market. At Belle's christening, Roman found out about John and Marlena's affair, and was furious. Marlena found out that Sami had switched Belle's paternity test, and John was actually Belle's father. Marlena moved out with Belle, and she and Roman divorced. John provided Marlena and Belle a place to stay while she was working out the divorce. Though their feelings were strong, John and Marlena were too guilt-ridden by their past mistakes to think about starting a relationship.

When Marlena was possessed, John helped perform an exorcism when he was led to believe he was a priest. He was successful, and Marlena was saved. He left the priesthood, and started a relationship with Kristen Blake, the adopted daughter of John and Marlena's worst enemy, Stefano DiMera. However, the pull between Marlena and John remained there. Kristen eventually became insecure, and hatched scheme after scheme to keep Marlena and John apart. John found out, and eventually broke up with her, and reunited with Marlena. Though the two were together, circumstances out of their control separated them again. Their love prevailed, though, and John and Marlena wed on July 5, 1999.

The couple faced many obstacles in their married life that included a brainwashed Hope Brady seducing John and becoming pregnant, though the child was later proven not to be John's, the feud between John's son, Brady and Marlena (later resolved), Marlena being brainwashed into believing she was a serial killer, and Marlena becoming pregnant with Roman's child, and later miscarrying the baby; Marlena develops amnesia, as a result.

In 2005, amnesia specialist Alex North came to town, later revealing himself to be Marlena's real husband from college. Marlena became torn between Alex and John and, due to John's raging jealousy and Alex's manipulations, especially his drugs, Marlena chose Alex. However, John did not give up on his love and did everything to try to win her back. However, even when it seemed that he was making headway, his drugs and manipulations enabled Alex to keep winning. The struggle continued to Morgan Island during Alex and Marlena's honeymoon in May 2006, after they had renewed their vows. During a fight on Morgan Island, Alex died.

Newly clearheaded, Marlena realized that Alex had been abusive during their marriage. She decided that she needed a little time to get back on her feet. Without any hard feelings, and with their love as strong as ever, Marlena chose to separate from John for a while, and she took a job in New Jersey. When it was discovered that Marlena was missing, however, John began to search for his love. With the help of Abe Carver, John rescued Marlena from a trunk in which she'd been held captive, in early October 2006. The couple's next obstacle, in December 2006, was fighting against Stefano DiMera's son EJ DiMera, who was sent by Stefano to kill John.

John and Marlena married for the third time (their first legal marriage) on December 5, 2006. However, none of the couple's children ( Eric, Sami, Brady or Belle) could attend. After being presumably shot by EJ, John fell into a coma. Marlena remained by his side, praying that he would wake up; he did wake up in May 2007. Also, John discovered that he was the son of Colleen Brady and Santo DiMera, thus making him the half-brother of his worst enemy Stefano DiMera. On October 17, John was a victim of a hit and run case, with the culprit remaining a mystery. John was taken into emergency, but apparently died peacefully in the arms of Marlena, his greatest love of all time. It was later discovered that his death was faked by Stefano.

Once again, John came back to Salem as Stefano's pawn and had no memory of his love for Marlena or his family (January 2008).

The couple endured a divorce due to John's inability to regain his memory and decision to live a life below Marlena's moral standards. When John regained his memory after a traumatic incident that left him temporarily (at least) paralyzed, John and Marlena reunited and were remarried before leaving the show on January 23, 2009.

John and Marlena (Drake and Deidre) returned to Days of our Lives on September 26, 2011 to celebrate the re-opening of the Horton Town Square. However, shortly after their arrival, John was arrested on embezzlement and corporate fraud charges. At first, John believed he was innocent but due to strong memory flashes, he quickly second guessed himself unaware that Stefano's son EJ has framed him for the crimes. When a rogue ex-cop fires shots into the Brady Pub where John, Marlena, Roman, Bo, Hope, Sami, Rafe, Caroline, and the kids are all present and when Johnny goes missing, John decides to plead guilty. On November 23, 2011, John is sentenced to 50 years in prison without the possibility of parole, equivalent to a life sentence. On December 23, 2011, Carrie and Rafe managed to find the evidence that would clear John's name. He was released and John and Marlena were reunited.

== Reception and impact ==
In December 2008, Days of our Lives announced Deidre Hall (Marlena) and Drake Hogestyn (John) were departing from the series. Soap Opera Digest reported that the news "not only rocked the daytime world, it made headline in the mainstream press." In the week of their departure, the magazine published a collector's edition issue which featured the Hogestyn and Hall on the cover. Inside, the fan responses were printed as well as the story of the actors' dismissal and a time line of the fictional pairing's storylines. Fans of John and Marlena purchased a full-page ad in this issue thanking Hogestyn and Hall for twenty years of portraying the pairing as a couple.

== Awards ==
Deidre Hall and Drake Hogestyn were nominated for a Soap Opera Digest award for "Hottest Romance" in 1998 and won a Soap Opera Digest award for "Favorite Couple" in 2005 for their portrayal of Marlena and John.

== See also ==
- List of supercouples
