= John Black (Days of Our Lives) =

- Days of Our Lives character
- Portrayed by: Drake Hogestyn (Note: As the Pawn, the role was originated by Glen Vincent on November 18, 1985. Vincent was replaced by Robert Poynton from November 27, 1985, to January 20, 1986, when Hogestyn made his debut. The other two actors are listed in the casting section because their faces never appeared onscreen without the bandages, so they would not be recognized in the role. Allan Wayne Anderson from May 23 to June 2, 2025, was credited as "John Double" in the role.)
- Duration: 1985–2009; 2011–2025
- First appearance: November 18, 1985
- Last appearance: June 2, 2025
- Created by: Sheri Anderson, Thom Racina and Leah Laiman
- Introduced by: Betty Corday and Al Rabin (1985); Ken Corday, Noel Maxam and Greg Meng (2011)
- Spin-off appearances: Days of Our Lives: One Stormy Night (1992); Days of Our Lives: Night Sins (1993); Days of Our Lives: Beyond Salem (2021–2022); Days of Our Lives: A Very Salem Christmas (2021)
In-universe information
- Other names: John Robicheaux; Forrest Alamain; The Pawn (1985–86, 2012); Stefano DiMera; Roman Brady (1986–91); John Stevens; Fr. John Black; Ryan Brady (Note: A February 2008 revelation led viewers to believe that John was actually Ryan Brady, the illegitimate son of Santo DiMera and Colleen Brady. However, on January 6, 2014, it was revealed that the orphanage lied to a desperate Colleen and that the real Ryan Brady had died as a child.)
- Occupation: Spy; Businessman; Private Investigator; Mercenary
- Father: Timothy Robicheaux
- Mother: Maude Robicheaux
- Adoptive parents: Leopold Alamain; Philomena Alamain
- Brothers: Lawrence Alamain (adoptive)
- Wife: Marlena Evans (1986–1991, 1999–2005, 2006–2008, 2009–2012, 2013–2014, 2018–2025); Isabella Toscano (1992); Susan Banks (1997) (Note: Susan was posing as Kristen DiMera at the wedding ceremony.); Hope Brady (1999–2012); Hattie Adams (2018)
- Sons: Brady Black; Paul Narita
- Daughters: Belle Black
- Stepchildren: Eric Brady; Sami Brady
- Grandchildren: Claire Brady; Tate Black; Rachel Black
- Aunts: Vivian Alamain (adoptive); Daphne DiMera (adoptive)
- Nephews: Nicholas Alamain (adoptive)
- First cousins: Quinn Hudson (adoptive); Tony DiMera (adoptive); Stefan DiMera (adoptive); Jake Lambert (adoptive)

John Black is a fictional character from Days of Our Lives, an American soap opera originally aired on NBC and now streaming on Peacock. Drake Hogestyn played the role from January 1986 until January 2009, and returned in September 2011. Hogestyn last appeared as John in the September 9, 2024, episode, two weeks before his death on September 28. Allan Wayne Anderson from May 23 to June 2, 2025, was credited as "John Double" in the role.

John was created by scriptwriters Sheri Anderson, Thom Racina and Leah Laiman as the Pawn in 1985, and introduced by executive producers Betty Corday and Al Rabin. He became one of the series' most popular characters when he was revealed to be the presumed-dead Roman Brady (Wayne Northrop), after plastic surgery and amnesia. Northrop's 1991 return led to Hogestyn's portrayal of Roman being retconned into the separate character of John Black, which establishes the supercouple pairing of John and Marlena due to John's affair with Roman's wife Marlena Evans (Deidre Hall).

== Development ==
=== Creation and casting ===
Character description

All I was told was there's this guy by the name of The Pawn who's in a drug-induced state and he's been shown a slide projector show for subliminal input.

— Drake Hogestyn, Soap Opera Now (1986)

On January 24, 1986, daytime newcomer and former minor-league baseball player Drake Hogestyn joined the cast as the Pawn without his bandages; he later assumed the alias of John Black. The Pawn (Glen Vincent, then Robert Poynton) was introduced onscreen in November 1985 and the casting department at Days of Our Lives had been searching for an older actor to play the character when Hogestyn came to the NBC casting offices to meet with Doris Sabbagh, head of the casting department at Columbia Pictures, about a guest spot on Crazy Like a Fox. Sabbagh brought Hogestyn in to audition for Days. He later said that he did not know anything about the role, and thought he had auditioned for ABC's One Life to Live. Hogestyn was a fan of daytime soaps and his agent had passed on several soap roles, "but Drake wanted this one"; he watched a few episodes, and went to the audition. Hogestyn was considered too young, but his screen test and chemistry with Deidre Hall gave him the role. He was chosen from five other actors, and signed a three-year contract.

=== Retcon (1991) ===
By the time John was revealed to be Roman in May 1986, Hogestyn had grown attached to the character: "One of the things I'm concerned about now is that it's going to be sad to put John Black to bed. I've had a lot of fun and it's been a stretch for me as an actor ... I had a chance to be very creative and take chances". He was then forced to take the character in another direction and see how viewers would react: "But I don't think they'll totally close the door on John Black". A year later, Hogestyn was happy with Roman but said he that initially wanted to find success in his own role instead of a recast. He later said that he never thought of himself as a recast "because I played five months as John Black before they told me I was Roman". In a 1990 interview, Hogestyn said that he hoped Wayne Northrop – the original Roman – could someday return as Roman: "Then you could start a whole new character out of that complication."

During the summer of 1991, it was reported that Northrop and Deidre Hall were in talks to return to the series and reprise their roles as Roman and Marlena; many wondered what would become of Hogestyn's Roman. It was later revealed that Hogestyn's Roman was actually John Black, and Northrop was the "real" Roman. Hogestyn attributed the plot twist to the "producers' own brilliance" (despite his suggestion of the storyline a year earlier), and appreciated the decision from a business perspective. Asked about the possibility of being Roman again if (or when) Northrop left the role—his return was expected to be brief—Hogestyn said, "I think I'd like to stay John Black because I've already been Roman and I wasn't him". Supervising executive producer Al Rabin said, "This is a story that we've wanted to tell for a long time"; there were elements of the story and hints that John might not be Roman during the 1988 "Stefano Returns" storyline. Rabin said that the plot would not affect Hogestyn's future with Days, since he had a four-year contract.

The producer denied speculation that the story would emulate the prime-time soap Dallas, in which Patrick Duffy's Bobby Ewing was killed off in season 8 and revealed to be alive in season 10; season 9 was attributed to a dream. To avoid confusion during production, the characters were identified in the script by number; Hogestyn was Roman II (John). The six-month storyline explored the effects on Roman and Marlena's twins, Eric and Samantha, who had been raised by Roman II for most of their lives. In 2002, Hogestyn said about the retcon: "This is daytime television, and you never know where the story is going to take you".

Twenty years later, One Life to Live did the same thing with Trevor St. John's popular portrayal of Todd Manning – a role originated by Roger Howarth, who was at least as popular. An element of the Days plot, where Roman II was Roman I's long-lost twin brother, factored into One Life to Live in 2011.

=== Relationships ===
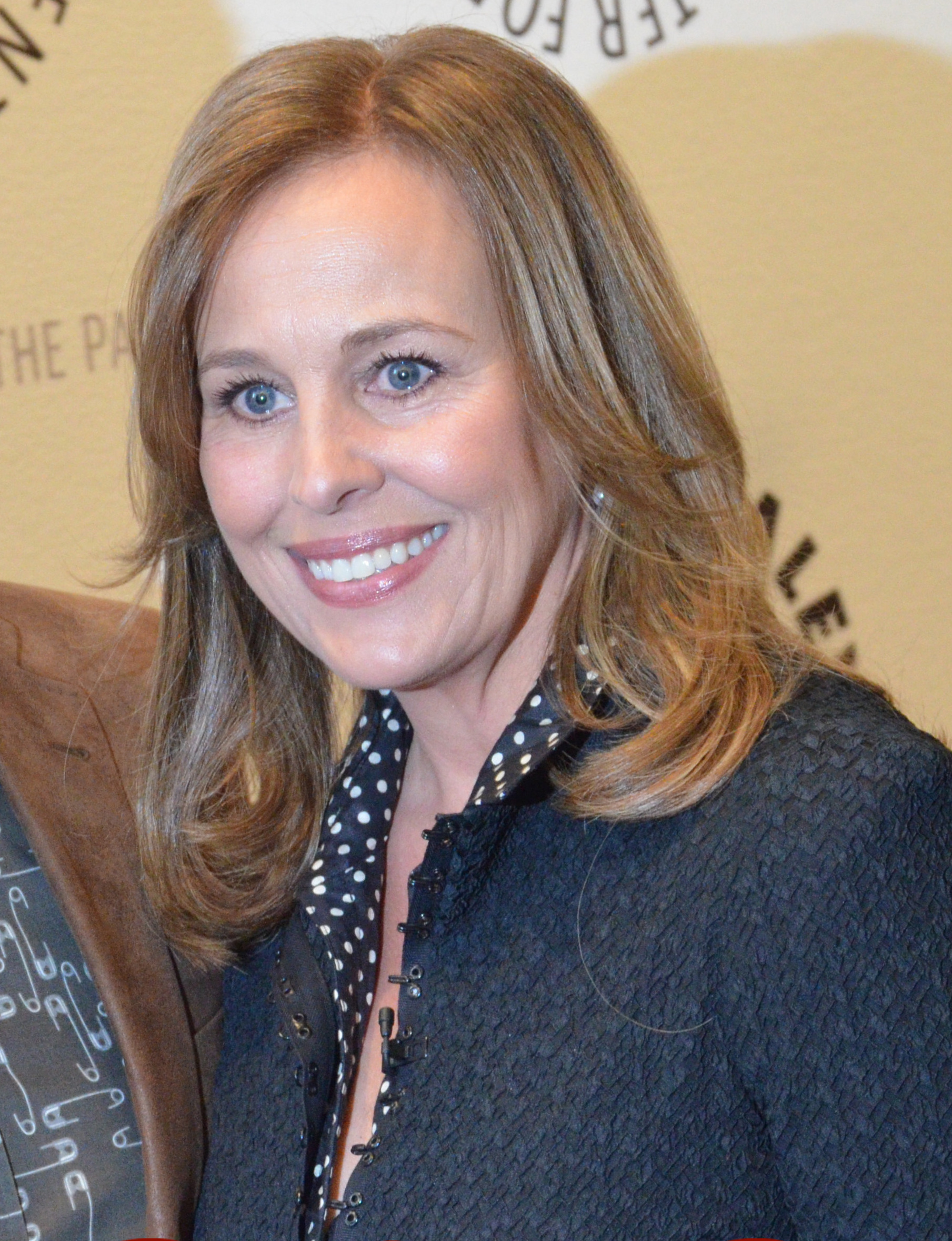
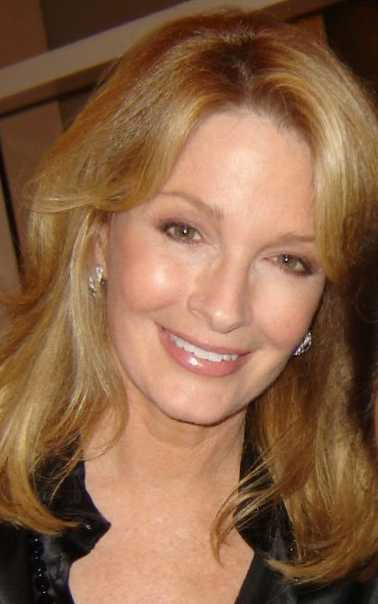
John's pairings with Diana Colville and Marlena Evans, played by Genie Francis (left) and Deidre Hall, were his most popular.

Hogestyn always hoped that his character would be paired with Marlena Evans (Deidre Hall), even when his identity was in question. Viewers began to agree; no matter who John Black was, he and Marlena were meant to be. When Hall left the series in 1987 and Marlena was killed off, it took some time for the producers to pair John with another woman: "I get the impression they're trying to keep a low profile because of Deidre's departure". Hogestyn was warned that he would not be getting many stories; "I was told I was going to be virtually non-existent", at least until Roman could grieve properly. Although it was difficult to wait, he understood why the writers put his character in the background: "You can't rush from one love story right into the next". Soap Opera Stars magazine later reported that the showrunners were unsure if Hogestyn would work without Hall, and there were plans to write his character out: "Roman's big goodbye scene was nearly in the works." After losing several stars, including Hall and Peter Reckell and Kristian Alfonso as Bo and Hope, the network knew that it could not afford to lose Hogestyn as well. Hogestyn viewed John and Marlena's relationship as a "classic love ... the perfect relationship", showing viewers that such a love is possible. Asked about a recast of Marlena instead of a new love interest, he said that he did not think viewers would accept it.

Finally believing that Hogestyn was popular enough to hold his own, the writers introduced a new love interest; John/Roman was paired with Diana Colville, played by General Hospital star Genie Francis. Hogestyn said that the writers gave the pair more creative input to establish a better dynamic. There were no plans to pair Roman/John with Diana, but their interactions helped the story write itself. Diana also had a romance with Mike Horton (Michael T. Weiss) and a failed engagement to Victor Kiriakis (John Aniston), and was considered as a love interest for the returning Bo Brady (Reckell); however, Hogestyn's chemistry with Francis "just couldn't be denied". John kidnaps Diana before she marries Victor. After an initial backlash from fans of Marlena who thought that the John-and-Diana relationship had developed too soon, most viewers became fans of the new pair after their first few scenes together. They had strong scenes from the beginning; "That was an accident" Hogestyn said. Despite its seeming too soon, the network ordered producers to capitalize on fan reaction. "Genie and I worked hard from day one to make Diana and Roman work", Hogestyn said. They injected humor into their scenes whenever they could: "That added a nice, little touch to our romance." John/Roman initially tries to keep Diana at arm's length because he fears getting as close to another woman as he did with Marlena, but her near-death experience was a "turning point in their relationship". Diana and John/Roman are considered a supercouple. When Francis left the series in 1989, Hogestyn again found himself on the back burner.

The character was next paired with Yvette DuPrés (Lori Hallier), who is also involved with his rival Victor Kiriakis. John/Roman keeps Yvette "at arm's length", and Hogestyn considered the romance a "relationship of convenience" for John/Roman to stick it to Victor "and at the same time have some fun". He said that the romance could not live up to his previous two pairings. Hogestyn was surprised by the abrupt ending of his romance with Yvette, and enjoyed working with Hallier: "She was very conscientious about wanting to work ... working scenes out. That was so refreshing for me." John's short-lived romance with Yvette seemed to be a precursor to his next love story, which was in the works in early 1990. John/Roman was next paired with Isabella Toscano (Staci Greason), the illegitimate daughter of Victor Kiriakis. Hogestyn enjoyed working with the newcomer: "She reminds me of me when I first started on the show ... I had no soap opera experience, and my energy was boundless."

=== Hogestyn's death and final appearance (2024) ===
Hogestyn died on September 28, 2024. Following his death, it was announced his final episodic appearance as John was during the episode released on September 9 of the same year, due to the soap's advanced taping schedule.

== Storylines ==
=== 1986–2009 ===
John Black was modeled after Robert Ludlum's spy, Jason Bourne, with elements of Ian Fleming's James Bond and Legendary martial-arts master/actor and philosopher Bruce Lee (John Black is a practitioner of the art of Jeet Kune Do). He has spent a good portion of his tenure on the series as an undercover agent for the International Security Alliance (ISA), the show's fictional secret-intelligence service (similar to that of Bruce Lee’s character from his final completed film Enter The Dragon). Days introduced audiences to the character in November 1985 as a heavily-bandaged amnesiac who was recovering from extensive reconstructive facial surgery. He was initially known only as "the Pawn", a name given to him by Stefano DiMera because of his love of chess. Stefano originally possessed and controlled him via brainwashing before Stefano's lieutenant, Ilya Petrov, assumed control of him. Victor Kiriakis took control of the Pawn after Victor had Petrov executed. During this time, despite an overall "Cold War" vibe—with the espionage angle, strategic locations such as Stockholm, Russian nationals such as Petrov and the Englund siblings (Lars and Britta), and the presence of the KGB—the underlying theme was more related to rivalries between competing Salem-based criminal organizations.

After escaping Victor's control, the Pawn renamed himself "John Black" after a name he saw on a war memorial. John meets Dr. Marlena Evans after he saves her from a criminal who attempted to rob Shenanigan's. He and Marlena develop a rapport almost immediately and he obtains a job as a security guard at Salem's University Hospital, where Marlena is a psychiatrist. Marlena begins to wonder about John's true identity. They come to believe that John was really Marlena's husband Roman Brady, who had been presumed dead two years earlier, and resume their lives as a happily-married couple and parents. John Black, now "Roman", rejoins the Salem police department and is promoted to commander. Their happiness is fleeting as Marlena is kidnapped by Roman's old enemy, Orpheus, and supposedly dies.

"Roman" moves on and becomes engaged to Isabella Toscano. Around the same time, Marlena reappeared in Salem and was reunited with Roman. That year, Wayne Northrop was recast as Roman Brady; the character Hogestyn had been playing for five years was retconned to be a soldier of Stefano DiMera, brainwashed into believing he was Roman to infiltrate the ISA for clues about the whereabouts of a priceless ancient Mayan treasure. Still amnesiac, the character returns to the John Black name. Marlena reunites with the real Roman, and John resumes his relationship with Isabella.

John then discovers that he is Forrest Alamain, brother of Lawrence Alamain; Stefano brainwashed Forrest into believing he was Roman as part of his vendetta against the Brady family. John is helped by Victor Kiriakis to figure out his identity, determine his birthright in the Alamain family, and set up his own business. In 1992 John marries Isabella, who gives birth to their son Brady Victor Black before she dies of cancer.

Distraught over Isabella's death, John's feelings for Marlena resurface in the "Pit" storyline and they begin an affair. Marlena's daughter, Sami Brady, learns about the affair and resents John and Marlena for hurting her father. The affair results in the birth of their daughter, Belle. Roman was initially believed to be Belle's father, but Marlena and Roman divorce when it is revealed that he is not. Knowing that their affair had hurt so many people, John pursues other relationships – most significantly with Kristen Blake, Stefano's adopted daughter. John and Kristen are engaged, and Kristen learns she is pregnant; when she miscarries, she fears losing John to Marlena. Kristen has Susan Banks, a pregnant look-alike, marry John in her place; she plans to take Susan's child and raise it as hers and John's. After Kristen's schemes are exposed, John breaks up with her and reunites with Marlena.

John and Marlena marry in 1999. On their honeymoon, he disappears and is brainwashed by Stefano into sleeping with Hope Williams Brady. Hope learns soon afterward that she is pregnant, and John is believed to be baby Zack's father until it is proven that the father is Hope's husband Bo. When the serial-killer Salem Stalker begins to murder Salem's most prominent citizens, evidence suggests that Marlena is the killer. She is arrested and imprisoned, but John works to prove her innocence. While trying to escape the police, Marlena is shot and apparently dies in John's arms. John reveals the Salem Stalker as another DiMera plot; Marlena and her "victims" are found alive on "Melaswen" (New Salem spelled backwards), a remote island. John is seriously injured during a failed rescue attempt, and becomes addicted to painkillers. He seeks solace in—and proposes to—Roman's widow, Kate Roberts. John and Kate break off their engagement when Roman and Marlena escape from Melaswen and reappear in Salem. When Marlena develops amnesia, her specialist Alex North is her presumed-dead first husband; this invalidates John and Marlena's marriage. She rejects John's love, feeling obligated to Alex. John discovers that Alex is a fraud who plotted to marry (and kill) Marlena. He saves Marlena, who regains her memory.

John and Marlena's reunion is cut short when a dying Stefano revives his vendetta with John by compelling his son, EJ DiMera, to shoot him; John lapses into a coma. He emerges from his coma in May 2007 and is hit by a car, appearing to die in Marlena's arms on October 17 of that year. John is discovered alive by Marlena in Stefano's basement in January 2008, his memory erased and programmed as a soldier. He does not remember Marlena, and commits crimes ordered by Stefano. Stefano orders him to kill Colleen Brady, but John learns that he is Colleen's son with Santo DiMera (making him Stefano's half-brother). He pursues the DiMera empire and Stefano after discovering his identity.

Frustrated by her inability to reach the old John, Marlena files for divorce. John tries to recommit himself to Marlena and remember their life together. Marlena arranges for John to receive therapy from Dr. Charlotte Taylor, whose father Kenneth was Marlena's mentor, unaware that Charlotte despises her for monopolizing Kenneth decades earlier. Charlotte deliberately disrupts John's attempts to recover his memories. With Colleen's help, John and Marlena discover Charlotte's duplicity. Charlotte tries to kill Marlena with a syringe, but injects John instead; he awakens paralyzed, but his memory is restored and the doctors say that he can be cured at a Swiss clinic. John asks Marlena to marry him again before they leave, and she accepts. They remarry in the hospital and leave Salem on January 23, 2009.

=== 2011–2025 ===
John and Marlena return to Salem after a two-year hiatus on September 26, 2011, for the dedication of the new Horton Town Square. They announce that John's physical therapy was successful and he can walk again. The FBI and the Salem Police Department order Rafe Hernandez to arrest John for embezzling from his company, Basic Black. To protect his family from danger, John pleads guilty and is sentenced to 25 years to life without parole. Rafe and Carrie Brady prove that the evidence against John was doctored, and he is exonerated. Hope and Bo learn that Hope and John were married while brainwashed by Stefano, invalidating their marriages to Bo and Marlena. John and Hope leave for Alamania to get a divorce.

In December 2012, during a conversation between Hope and Marlena, Days viewers learn that John and Hope's divorce had been finalized; Kristen has returned to Salem, insisting that she has changed after therapy. John believes her; Marlena is suspicious, and is frustrated by John's optimism. She insists that Kristen has not changed, and John suggests that she is obsessed with her. When Kristen starts dating Brady, however, John is determined to get Kristen away from his son; he tries to seduce Kristen and push Marlena away. Kristen decides not to seek revenge and accept Brady's love but when Brady discovers her scheming, he breaks up with her. Marlena learns about John's scheming, and they separate bitterly. He leaves town on an ISA mission, and they file for divorce.

In January 2014, John discovers that he is not the son of Colleen Brady and Santo DiMera because the real Ryan Brady has died. He returns to Salem, concerned about Brady's drug use and relationship with Theresa Donovan. After Theresa brags about eloping with a drunk Brady in Las Vegas, John records her confession. Theresa panics and hits John in the head, sending him into a coma. He awakens and learns that Kristen is back in town. When John learns that Theresa lied, claiming that Brady attacked him, he confirms the lie so Brady will not reconcile with Kristen. Brady finds out, and denounces his father. John leaves town to take care of Basic Black business in Europe, hoping to give Brady space. He returns to Salem to salvage his relationship with Marlena and Brady. In early 2015, commissioner Abe Carver asks John to rejoin the Salem Police Department. He takes the job with Marlena's blessing, despite a threat from Stefano.

Salem newcomer Paul Narita is revealed in March 2015 as John's biological son, the result of a relationship with Tori. John and Paul have a falling-out before the revelation, and John tries to establish a father-son relationship.

In August 2015, John is approached by the ISA to rejoin the agency. His consideration of the offer causes friction with Marlena, from whom he is separated. John wants to rejoin the ISA to take advantage of its resources to find his parents and decode the mystery of his past for the sake of his children and grandchildren.

John finally learns the truth behind his murky past in early 2016. He was born John Robicheaux in 1953 in rural Louisiana, the son of Timothy and Maude Robicheaux. Timothy was a kind, modest, and charitable farmer who was drafted into the U.S. Army to serve in the Korean War, and was believed to have died heroically in battle two months before John's birth. Unable to care for John on her own, Maude allowed a wealthy neighboring couple to adopt him. When they were killed in an automobile accident, she put John in an orphanage; he was adopted by Leopold and Philomena Alamain, brought to their home in Europe, and named Forrest Alamain.

John learns that Timothy Robicheaux (Tobin Bell) did not die in the war. Wounded and disillusioned by his combat experiences and the war's political environment, he deserted and fled to China to begin a new life. He steeped himself in the martial arts, Eastern philosophy and Communist ideology, calling himself Yo Ling (Chinese for "phantom"). Yo Ling's views became more radical and he helped establish the Phantom Alliance, an organization of professional spies and assassins whose goal was to destabilize the West and bring about a worldwide revolution. Among Yo Ling's confederates in the Alliance was Soviet agent Ilya Petrov.

As the Phantom Alliance grew in power and influence, it established a clandestine training center in the United States with the private New England Winterthorne Academy as cover. Yo Ling eventually learned what happened to John. He and Petrov found John having been adopted by and living with the Alamain family and paid the family for custody of John with promises of a good life and prestigious education in the U.S. The family faked "Forrest Alamain"'s death in a swimming accident, and Yo Ling and Petrov brought him to Winterthorne to be indoctrinated, trained as an assassin, and groomed for a role in the Alliance's upper echelon.

Petrov formed a business relationship with international criminal Stefano DiMera (who at the time was Philomena Alamain's brother-in-law) and provided him with the ultimate "soldier" in John. Petrov moved to working full-time for Stefano, teaching him how to "program" John with the Alliance's brainwashing methods.

John learns that he became Stefano's "Pawn", involved in schemes and operations on his behalf. In 1986, Stefano (believed to be dead and operating through Petrov) staked his "Pawn" as a wager in a high-stakes yacht race in Miami with Victor Kiriakis and ISA director George Nickerson. The stakes were a "purse" (clues to the location of a priceless Mayan treasure), "power" (a book of ISA codes), and the "Pawn". Victor won the wager (and thus, custody of John), and brought him back to Salem.

Petrov and Nickerson hinted to Victor and other Salem residents that John was the presumed-dead Roman Brady, a police captain and former high-value ISA agent. With brainwashing techniques learned from Petrov and Rolf, Stefano implanted enough facts from Roman's life into John's subconscious that convinced everyone (including John) that he was Roman Brady (although Victor eventually learned otherwise and kept this knowledge a secret). Stefano did this to use his "Roman" imposter to infiltrate the ISA for clues about the location of the Mayan treasure and to wreak havoc in Roman's family, against whom Stefano's father had a longstanding vendetta.

After learning his life story John finds the dying Yo Ling, who take John and fellow Phantom Alliance acolyte Eduardo Hernandez captive. Ling is killed during their rescue of John's son, Paul Narita.

John is fired from the ISA and opens Black Patch, a private investigation firm, with Steve Johnson. In late 2016 and early 2017, as Drake Hogestyn was recovering from injuries sustained in an on-set accident, John's absence is explained by a visit to his native Louisiana and a long-term ISA "mission". John returns in mid-2017 from a deep-cover ISA assignment to join Marlena on a mission to rescue several younger Salemites, including his son Paul, from a deserted island. That year, he helps Paul solve the mystery of Deimos Kiriakis's murder.

In 2018, John begins exhibiting strange behavior, including poisoning his friend Steve and violent confrontations with son Paul and step-grandson Will Horton. It's later revealed that this is ordered by ISA director Pamela Van Damme, with implied threats to John's family if he doesn't comply. It turns out that Pamela risked significant criminal and political exposure by claiming that Ava Vitali's murder a couple of years prior was an ISA-ordered hit under "national security" auspices, and wants revenge against Steve and his family for allowing their son Joey to take the blame and jeopardizing Pamela's career (and freedom). John is blackmailed into poisoning Steve, but is trying to buy time to obtain an antidote. The antidote works; the friends and business partners reconcile with lasting damage to Steve's eyesight, for which John still blames himself. By 2022, John is a private investigator and one of Salem's elder statesmen.

In September 2023, an amnesiac veteran (played by Dick Van Dyke) was revealed as the real Timothy Robicheaux (John's father). It's revealed that Timothy fractured his skull in the Korean War during a mortar attack (causing the long-term amnesia), and was left for dead by fellow soldier Joseph Bell. Bell switched dog tags with Timothy, assumed his identity, deserted to China, and became "Yo Ling". John's research (with help from Marlena) helps Timothy regain his memory, and he "officially" meets his son John and his extended family.

A revisit to John's past as the "Pawn" was hinted at later that year, including his longtime connection with Steve, the knowledge Victor had about his past, and a newfound connection with Victor's former associate Konstantin Meleounis. By early 2024, Konstantin indicates knowledge of Steve and John's past (John as the Pawn and Steve as an employee of Victor's criminal organization who was assigned to be the Pawn's "handler", with a slight rewrite to accommodate the new story) and involvement with an incident in Greece during the 1980s. Apparently, when Victor first took control of the Pawn in 1986, he directed Steve to take him to Greece to "rough up" Konstantin due to the latter's crossing Victor in the local underworld. Although no verifiable witnesses came to light, Konstantin believed the Pawn shot and killed his daughter Catharina, and part of his arrival in Salem was to gain revenge against Victor and his former associates Steve and John. A final confrontation with Konstantin ended up with him dead, and John planning another trip to Greece to find closure to this mysterious part of his past.

After John disappeared during his trip to Greece, he was found being held captive in a warehouse in Poplar Bluff, Missouri by Chad DiMera and Jack Deveraux, who were searching for a mysterious woman who claimed to be the deceased Abigail Deveraux. John had no idea how he ended up there, but the circumstances led to speculation of involvement with villain Clyde Weston and possibly even Catharina Meleounis, the young woman John was led to believe he'd killed as "the Pawn". In 2025, it was revealed that rather than an assassination, John as the "Pawn" was sent by Victor to Greece in 1986, not to kill anyone, but rather to fake the deaths of Catharina and her mother (Konstantin's wife) to help them get out of a bad marriage/situation and emigrate to America. Rather than being a villain, it turns out that John was, as usual, the hero.

Upon the death of Drake Hogestyn, his final actual onscreen appearance as John was a family scene showing support to his children during their own travails. John would disappear, and ultimately perish, during yet another secret ISA mission. This final mission involved the investigation of a nuclear device being built by shady elements in a secret facility in Estonia, involving John’s old arch-nemesis Orpheus. After going missing for a while, John is found and returns to Salem in 2025, only to be seriously injured in an explosion during a mission to retrieve an experimental drug from a laboratory in order to save his old friend Bo Brady. John eventually dies from his injuries on June 2, 2025.

== Reception ==
In 2020, Charlie Mason of Soaps She Knows ranked John ninth on his list of the 35 most memorable characters from Days of Our Lives: "Whether we thought that Drake Hogestyn's character — a perpetual identity crisis — was the character at No. 22 [Roman Brady], the Pawn, a priest, an Alamain ... you name it, we were always the same thing: riveted".
