= Roman Brady =

Fictional character from Days of Our Lives

- Days of our Lives character
- Josh Taylor as Roman Brady
- Portrayed by: Wayne Northrop (1981–1984, 1991–1994); Josh Taylor (1997–present)
- Duration: 1981–1984; 1991–1994; 1997–present
- First appearance: December 8, 1981
- Created by: Pat Falken Smith
- Introduced by: Betty Corday and Al Rabin
- Wayne Northrop as Roman Brady
In-universe information
- Occupation: Police commissioner Pub owner
- Family: Brady family
- Parents: Shawn Brady; Caroline Brady
- Brothers: Frankie Brady (adoptive); Max Brady (adoptive)
- Sisters: Kimberly Brady; Kayla Brady
- Half-brothers: Bo Brady
- Wife: Anna DiMera (until 1982); Marlena Evans (1983–94); Kate Roberts (2003–05, 2022–present)
- Sons: Eric Brady; Rex Brady
- Daughters: Carrie Brady; Sami Brady; Cassie Brady
- Grandsons: Will Horton; Johnny DiMera; Noah Reed; Jude Brady
- Granddaughters: Allie Horton; Sydney DiMera; Emily Lockhart; Mackenzie Horton
- Grandparents: Peter Brady
- Aunts and uncles: Eric Brady; Colleen Brady; Molly Murphy
- Nieces and nephews: Andrew Donovan; Theresa Donovan; Stephanie Johnson; Joey Johnson; Shawn-Douglas Brady; Chelsea Brady; Zack Brady; Ciara Brady
- First cousins: Ryan Brady; Colin Murphy
- Other relatives: Arianna Horton; Henry Horton; Trey DiMera (adoptive); Olivia DiMera

Roman Brady is a fictional character from the NBC/Peacock soap opera Days of Our Lives. The role was originated in 1981 by Wayne Northrop, who played the role until 1984 and from 1991 to 1994, and is currently being portrayed by series veteran Josh Taylor, who stepped into the role in 1997. Roman is a member of the fictional Brady family, and has been a central character on the show since his introduction in 1981. Over the years, Roman has been involved in a number of storylines, including romances, family conflicts, and mystery plots.

== Casting ==
The role was originated on December 8, 1981, by Wayne Northrop. Northrop departed from the series on November 26, 1984, and the character was killed off during a battle with his arch-nemesis, international criminal mastermind Stefano DiMera. On November 27, 1985, the series introduced a character known as The Pawn, an amnesiac mystery man ostensibly connected to Stefano but now in the custody of Stefano's rival and local businessman/mobster Victor Kiriakis. The role was portrayed by Robert Poynton until January 20, 1986, though the character's face is wrapped in bandages. On January 24, 1986, The Pawn's bandages were finally removed as Drake Hogestyn made his first appearance as John Black, a character with no memory of his past or knowledge of his real identity. In May 1986, Hogestyn's character of John is revealed to be Roman who had been treated to extensive brainwashing and plastic surgery courtesy of Stefano, and Hogestyn played the role written as Roman until 1991. When Northrop returned as Roman on August 30, 1991, the character that Hogestyn had been portraying for five years was retconned to be an entirely separate character that had been brainwashed to believe he was Roman Brady. Northrop once again departed from the series on August 2, 1994. On July 18, 1997, Josh Taylor appeared in the role as a recast of Roman Brady. The casting was met with criticism due to Taylor's previous portrayal of Chris Kositchek, one of Roman and Marlena's closest friends. Northrop was later recast as another new character, Dr. Alex North, and scenes from Northrop's time playing Roman were edited to create the new character's backstory.

== Characterization ==
Roman is the retired police commissioner of the fictional Midwestern town of Salem, manages and tends bar at his family's business, the Brady Pub, and works as a part-time private investigator for Black Patch, a firm run by his friends John Black and Steve Johnson. He is also a former agent of the fictional International Security Alliance (ISA), a spy agency focused on all sorts of unusually high-level global conspiracies that tended to center around his otherwise-quiet home town.

During Roman's portrayal by Northrop, he was established as a top-notch cop but also a bit of a renegade, often taking on deep-cover assignments (with or without official sanction), a master of disguise (similar to Sherlock Holmes), and fairly playful and fun-loving in his private life.

Hogestyn's character was more by-the-book on the job, although still dangerous with a dark side somewhat characteristic of an ex-spy (which later fed into the "John Black" persona), with expertise in Bruce Lee's Jeet Kune Do, a little more of a ladies' man (after Marlena was believed dead), but a little more serious and brooding.

Taylor's portrayal is more that of a "regular guy", with a bit less intrigue and more straightforward professionally, although still with an eye for the ladies and more inclined to engage in one-night stands with various women than the character as portrayed by Northrop or Hogestyn (such as with Kate Roberts, Billie Reed, ex-wives Anna DiMera and Marlena Evans, and a strongly hinted at – but never confirmed – rendezvous with Nicole Walker).

Over the years, much has been made of the creation (and constant retcon of the backstory) of Hogestyn's character John Black as an entirely separate character than that of Roman Brady, especially after the show had invested over five years in establishing John's identity as Roman, complete with a plausible backstory (and flashbacks) of his “time away” (while he was being held captive, brainwashed, and trained—-unsuccessfully—-to be an assassin by Stefano DiMera), and "Roman's" reemerging memories.

== Storylines ==
=== 1981–1984 ===
Roman Brady first appeared on Days to protect Marlena Evans from a serial killer. He slept on her floor. The chemistry between the actors, and the characters, led to love. In 1983 on Days of Our Lives, Roman and Marlena were married. Over the next year Roman became embroiled in a storyline with Stefano DiMera. Stefano was a powerful and ruthless business tycoon (and organized crime figure) from Europe who had come to town to set up shop in Salem, and Roman being the city's top cop had gone after him. Subsequently Stefano framed Roman for serial killings that were being committed by his nephew Andre DiMera. At the time Marlena saw Roman killing a woman. Later it was shown that Andre had used a realistic mask. Roman was jailed. Mrs. Alice Horton baked him some drugged doughnuts, and on the way to the hospital Roman escaped. He went on the run to prove his innocence, and he accomplished that. He was promoted, and Stefano was on the run.

In November 1984, Roman tracked Stefano to a Caribbean island where many other characters had crash-landed, too. Stefano was suffering from incurable cancer, and needed to collect three mysterious prisms to unlock a secret formula to cure himself. Roman caught up to him on a cliff, but Stefano pulled a gun. He shot Roman, who seemingly fell to his death. His brother Bo cradled him in his arms on the beach, but had to leave him for a few minutes. When he returned the body was gone. Bo assumed that while he was away, the tide had come in and washed Roman’s body out to sea, for which Bo blamed himself for years. Several episodes later Roman was shown aboard Stefano's yacht, motionless.

=== 1986–1990 ===
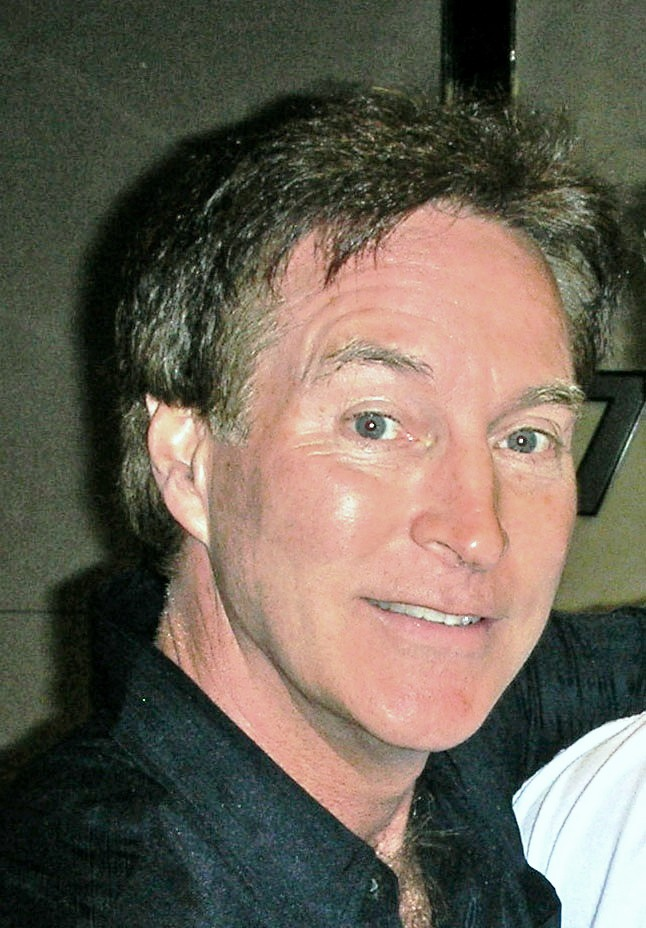
Drake Hogestyn (pictured) was cast as Roman; his casting was later retconned to the character of John Black when Wayne Northrop returned to the role.

On November 18, 1985, an amnesiac known only as "the Pawn" appeared in Salem. He assumed the name "John Black" on January 24, 1986, after reading it on a Vietnam War memorial in Salem. Eventually the character was revealed to be Roman Brady having undergone extensive plastic surgery, brainwashing, and martial arts training (purportedly to be trained as an assassin) by Stefano DiMera. After an uneasy "re-introduction" to his family and friends in Salem, the character resumed his life as Roman.

Shortly after his return, Roman went about trying to reclaim his memories while being pulled into an old case from his early ISA days in Stockholm, dealing with a set of stolen U.S. Treasury engravings and involving Stefano's "replacement" as the head of the Salem underworld, Victor Kiriakis, and Roman's own brother Bo Brady. Unfortunately, another antagonist in the Stockholm caper, former ISA colleague Orpheus, blamed Roman for the death of his wife, and retaliated by kidnapping Marlena, leading to her death in a plane crash during an attempted escape. Roman later got involved in various other storylines, and eventually found love again with reporter Diana Colville.

In 1988, a storyline featuring a reappearance by Stefano (who had been believed dead) focused on what had happened to Roman during his time in captivity (1984–1986). Roman and loved ones traveled back to the Caribbean island where Roman had "died" in 1984, and it was revealed that the ISA knew all along that Roman was being held by Stefano and being trained via brainwashing, and extensive instruction by a martial arts master named Orion Hawk, to be one of Stefano's assassins. In fact, the ISA unsuccessfully tried to infiltrate Orion's training camp to extract Roman, but this failed due to the high level of security at Stefano's compound as well as Roman's brainwashed state. This tied into the introduction of Benjy, Stefano's son (and Orion's grandson) who was fostered for a while by Steve and Kayla Johnson. Although subtle hints pointed to the possibility of this "Roman" turning out to be someone else, abetted by speculation by fans and by Hogestyn himself, the clues seemed to tie back together with the resolution that, at least for the moment, the character portrayed by Hogestyn was in fact Roman Brady.

=== 1991–1994 ===
After believing that Roman's wife, Marlena Evans, had been dead for some years, and later relationships with reporter Diana Colville and prostitute-turned-mob informant Yvette Dupree ran their course, Roman had fallen in love with a woman named Isabella Toscano. In 1991 Marlena turns up alive. In August 1991 the character who had been presumed as Roman Brady since 1986 is retroactively revealed to be a separate character (now once again called John Black) who was brainwashed to believe he was Roman, when what would now be the real Roman (once again played by Wayne Northrop) was found on an island where he had been imprisoned by Stefano. Roman was shocked when he found he had been replaced and all his family had accepted John Black as him and John Black had a difficult time accepting he was not really Roman. Roman went back to his life, and he and Marlena tried to live once again as man and wife. After the death of Isabella, in his grief John turned to Marlena for comfort. The two found themselves unable to resolve their feelings for each other from their life together when John believed himself to be Roman. He and Marlena had an affair that resulted in the birth of a daughter, Isabella, named after Isabella Toscano, whom Roman believed to be his own daughter. When he discovered that Marlena and John had an affair and that Belle was not his real daughter, Roman was crushed. In August 1994, Roman leaves town broken and bitter, once again with no family. Later it was said that Roman had died on a mission for the ISA.

=== 1997–present ===
In 1997 Josh Taylor was brought in as Roman, who was revealed by Stefano DiMera and Kristen Blake to be alive after being exposed to biological warfare while on a deep-cover ISA mission in South America. The cure to his ailment was discovered by John, Hope, and Stefano in a jungle mission that was engineered to drive John and Marlena apart, but in the end had the opposite result.

Roman was "killed" during the Salem Stalker Murders in December 2003 during his wedding reception to Kate Roberts, but again was revealed to not really be dead. He lived on the island of Melaswen (New Salem) with every other victim from the Salem Stalker Murders, including Marlena. Eventually, other Salemites arrived on the island, trying to find their "dead" loved ones. Some of them went out in the jungle, looking for a way off the island, while the rest remained in "Salem" waiting for help. Help finally arrived. Jennifer got to the island, then Hope and Patrick and finally Bo and John. Everyone banded together to get off the island, but Tony wasn't going to make it easy. He created a volcanic eruption, which eventually caused a giant wave. As everyone gathered on makeshift rafts to get off the island, the wave crashed over them. The Coast Guard arrived and managed to rescue some of them, but Roman, Marlena, Jack, and his daughter Cassie were not saved. They were in the clutches of Tony DiMera once again, and he took them to a remote European castle where he held them captive.

While in the castle, Tony DiMera (actually Andre DiMera) tormented Roman and Marlena with video of John and Kate growing ever closer back in Salem. Eventually, they believed the two of them had sex, and Roman and Marlena, needing comfort, had sex as well. Shortly thereafter, Jack made his way into their room. They escaped! Through fire and explosions, our group of intrepid Salemites – Marlena, Roman, Jack and Cassie – all got out and were on their way home.

On the ISA jet on the way back to Salem, Roman and Marlena made the decision to not tell Kate and John that they had sex. Marlena was uncomfortable with lying to John, but eventually agreed with Roman. When they arrived back they were shocked to learn that John and Kate had fallen in love and were engaged to be married, but Roman and Marlena still didn't tell the truth about their affair. Soon after they were back Marlena discovered that she was pregnant and that Roman had to be the father, but when the truth came out John wasn't too forgiving. During a fight between Roman and John, Marlena tumbled down the stairs, causing a miscarriage.

As the second decade of the 21st century has unfolded, Roman is the commissioner of the Salem police force. After an ill-fated marriage to Kate Roberts, he has remained single and adopted an elder-statesman, back-burner role on the show. He serves primarily as the de facto patriarch of the Brady family and the supervisor and occasional voice-of-reason to junior police officers and ISA agents (with a catchphrase of sorts developing from his consistent inquiries of "what da hell" is going on). He has largely made peace with his past with Stefano DiMera, John Black, and Victor Kiriakis, and remains friends with ex-wives Anna, Marlena and Kate, and is occasionally shown as having a soft spot for all of them. In March 2017, he retires as police commissioner and is seen later tending bar at the Brady Pub. In 2018, he begins working with his friends John Black and Steve Johnson at their private detective business, Black Patch. Hattie Adams, Marlena's doppelganger, develops feelings for Roman and tries to trick him into thinking she is Marlena, but this does not work out. In 2021, he rekindles his romance with Kate, and they remarry the following year.

== Reception ==
In 2020, Charlie Mason from Soaps She Knows placed Roman 22nd on their list of the 35 most memorable characters from Days of Our Lives, saying that "when Wayne Northrop originated the role that Josh Taylor now plays, rough-around-the-edges Roman won not only Marlena’s heart but viewers’, too." Mason also commented that it was a big "mistake" that Roman is now "mostly relegated to the back burner".
