= Drake Hogestyn =

American actor (1953–2024)

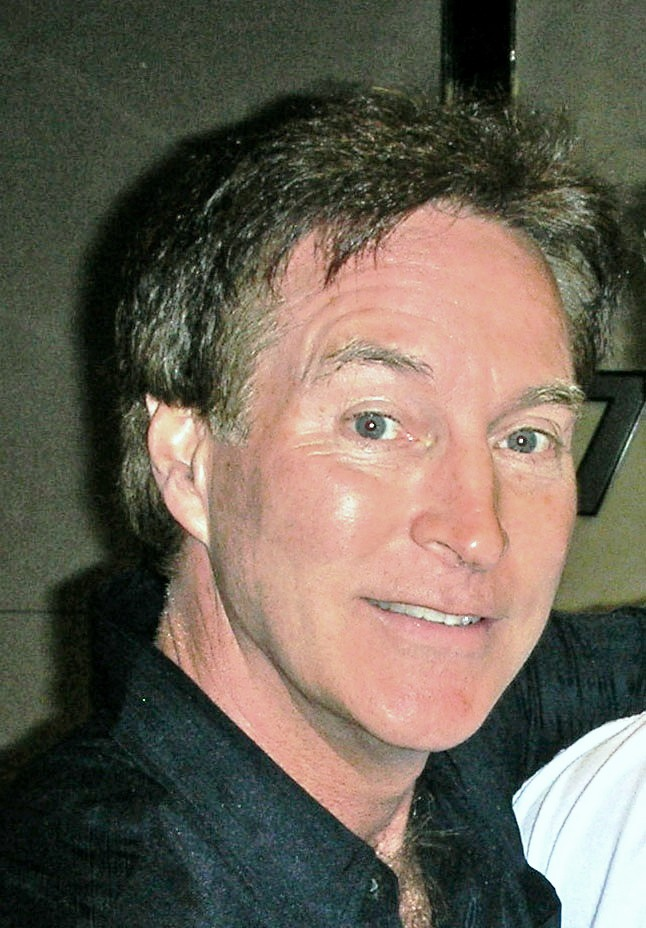
- Hogestyn in 2010
- Born: Donald Drake Hogestyn; September 29, 1953; Fort Wayne, Indiana, U.S
- Died: September 28, 2024 (aged 70); Malibu, California, U.S.
- Education: University of South Florida
- Occupation: Actor
- Years active: 1982–2024
- Known for: Portrayal of John Black in Days of Our Lives
- Spouse: Victoria Post
- Children: 4

Donald Drake Hogestyn (/ˈhʌdʒstən/; September 29, 1953 – September 28, 2024) was an American actor best known for his long-running role as John Black on the American soap opera Days of Our Lives.

== Early life ==
Hogestyn was born on September 29, 1953, in Fort Wayne, Indiana, where he graduated from North Side High School in 1971. He attended the University of South Florida in Tampa on a baseball scholarship, majoring in pre-dentistry. He graduated with a double major in microbiology and applied sciences. He was then drafted by two professional baseball organizations: the St. Louis Cardinals and the New York Yankees. Hogestyn signed with the Yankees and played third base for one of their farm teams until he was injured in 1977.

== Career ==
Hogestyn began his acting career by entering a Columbia Pictures talent search that included 75,000 people. Hogestyn was among the 30 selected, and his first starring role was on the prime time series Seven Brides for Seven Brothers. After a few minor roles (one as Kort, leader of the Micro Workers in the episode 'Princess Metra' on the 80s television series Otherworld), Hogestyn joined the cast of Days of our Lives in 1986. He initially played a mystery man referred to simply as "The Pawn." However, it was soon revealed The Pawn was the presumed dead Roman Brady. Hogestyn quickly became a fan favorite and enjoyed many pairings, the most popular of which was with longtime co-star Deidre Hall. In 1998, while starring on Days, Shelley Long enlisted Hogestyn to join her for the upcoming series Kelly, Kelly. He was set to star in both until the filming of the pilot episode of Kelly, Kelly conflicted with his schedule on Days, and the role went to Robert Hays.

In 1991, Wayne Northrop agreed to return to Days to reprise his role of Roman. In order to keep both actors on the show, Drake's story was retconned, and his past was rewritten. Despite this change, Hogestyn remained one of the show's most popular actors. The pairing of John Black and Marlena Evans (Deidre Hall) is one of the show's enduring supercouples.

In November 2008, it was announced Hogestyn, along with Hall, had been fired from Days of Our Lives, with budget cuts cited as reason for their exits. In July 2011, it was announced Hogestyn and Hall would reprise their roles as John and Marlena, respectively, in an attempt to "refresh" the soap. Hogestyn made his final appearance in the role during the episode released on September 9, 2024, due to the soap's advanced taping schedule and his death on September 28 of the same year.

== Personal life and death ==
Hogestyn and his wife Victoria had four children.

Hogestyn died from pancreatic cancer at his home in Malibu, California, on September 28, 2024, aged 70.

== Filmography ==
List of acting roles
Year	Title	Role	Notes
1982–1983	Seven Brides for Seven Brothers	Brian McFadden	Main role
1985	Otherworld	Kort	1 episode
1985	Generation	Jack Breed	Television film
1985	Beverly Hills Cowgirl Blues	Rod	Television film
1986–2009, 2011–2024	Days of Our Lives	John Black	Series regular
1992	One Stormy Night	John Black	Television film (NBC)
1993	Night Sins	John Black	Television film (NBC)
2018	Criminal Minds	Senator Alfred Mayhew	1 episode
2020	Christmas Tree Lane	Benjamin Reilly	Television film (Hallmark Channel)
2021–2022	Days of Our Lives: Beyond Salem	John Black	Limited series (Peacock)
2021	Days of Our Lives: A Very Salem Christmas	John Black	Peacock original film

== Awards, honors and nominations ==
- Soap Opera Digest awards and nominations:
  - Winner, Hottest Male Star (1994)
  - Winner, Hottest Male Star (1995)
  - Nominated, Hottest Male Star (1997)
  - Nominated, Hottest Male Star (1998)
  - Nominated, Hottest Romance (1998) shared with Deidre Hall
  - Nominated, Favorite Couple (1999) shared with Deidre Hall
  - Winner, Favorite Couple (2005) shared with Deidre Hall

== See also ==
- John Black and Marlena Evans
- Supercouple
