= Deidre Hall =

American actress (born 1947)

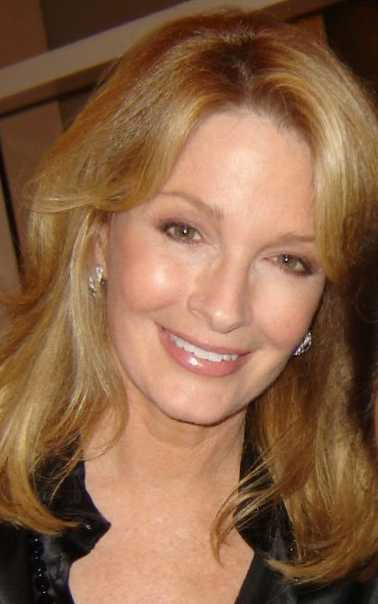
- Hall in November 2005
- Born: October 31, 1947 (age 78); Milwaukee, Wisconsin, U.S.
- Education: Palm Beach Junior College
- Occupations: Actress; model
- Years active: 1970–present
- Known for: Marlena Evans in Days of Our Lives; Electra Woman and Dyna Girl
- Spouse(s): William Hudson (1966–1970); Keith Barbour (1972–1977); Michael Dubelko (1987–1989); Steve Sohmer (1991–2006)
- Children: 2
- Relatives: Andrea Hall (sister)
- Website: deidrehall.com

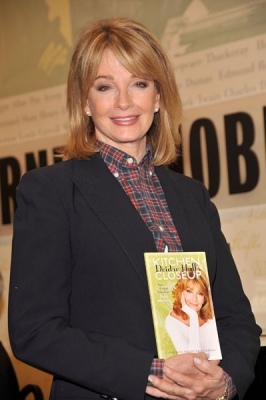
Hall at an autograph session for Deidre Hall's Kitchen Close Up in 2010

Deidre Hall (born October 31, 1947) is an American actress and model. She is best known for her portrayal of Marlena Evans on the NBC/Peacock daytime drama Days of Our Lives, whom she has played for 50 years.

Hall has won many awards for her portrayal of Marlena, including two Best Actress Soapy Awards in 1982 and 1983. Hall has won three Soap Opera Digest Awards for Outstanding Lead Actress in 1984, 1985, and 1995. Hall was the first recipient of the Outstanding Contribution by an Actress/Actor Award in 1986; in addition to receiving a shared award with Drake Hogestyn in 2005 for Favourite Couple: John and Marlena. Hall has also been nominated for a Daytime Emmy three times.

== Early years ==
The third of five children born to John and Jeanie Hall, Deidre and her twin sister, Andrea, were born on October 31, 1947, in Milwaukee, Wisconsin, and raised in Lake Worth, Florida. She studied psychology before moving into acting.

== Career ==
Along with her sister, Andrea, Hall appeared in press materials for the 1952 Hudson Twin-H-Power engine. In her late teens, Hall traveled to Los Angeles for the summer – while attending Palm Beach Junior College – and there she landed some modeling jobs and commercials through an agent. Quickly, she began appearing in television shows, thinking it was temporary until getting a serious career as a psychologist. In a later interview, she recalled that one day, she realized that acting was her serious career.

In the late 1960s Hall posed topless for various men's magazines, under the names Glenda Cole and Heidi Dorrington.

In 1976, she played the role of Electra Woman in Electra Woman and Dyna Girl, a Sid and Marty Krofft live action children's show that aired on Saturday mornings.

Hall appeared on a number of shows, including Emergency! (as Nurse Sally Lewis in the first two seasons), and The Young and the Restless (as Barbara Anderson), before joining Days of Our Lives in 1976 as Dr. Marlena Evans. In an interview, Hall said that she thought that she would have no chance to land the role of Marlena, considering that she was unsure about a career in soap operas, as well as having to compete against established soap opera veterans for the role. Hall was cast, though, and the role skyrocketed her to fame, which was proved by fan protests when a 1979 NBC promo hinted that Hall's character would be killed off. Two separate daytime television magazines named Hall the best soap actress of 1983.

In 1986, Hall began playing Jessie Witherspoon on the family drama Our House, which ran for two seasons on NBC. Wilford Brimley, who was 13 years older than Hall, played her father-in-law in the series; Chad Allen, her son; Shannen Doherty, her older daughter. Hall initially reacted without concern on playing on two television series at a time, explaining that she filmed Our House on weekdays while taping Days of Our Lives on Saturdays. However, she left Days of Our Lives in 1987 when it became too difficult to co-ordinate her prime time and daytime schedules. Our House was cancelled in 1988, though she did not immediately return to the soap opera.

Hall made guest appearances on a variety of prime time shows until March 1991, when she made a return to Days of Our Lives. This decision was a result of a request by producer Ken Corday, who hoped her return would have influence on the low ratings. According to the actress, she was approached to play a new character, but she refused and insisted on portraying Marlena, with a contract for six months only. Producers were reluctant to give into Hall's requests, fearing that the fans would leave after six months when she left. However, she remained on contract with the show for 18 more years until January 24, 2009, when she was terminated because of budget cuts mandated by NBC. Her salary on Days of Our Lives was in the range of $60,000 per month, much higher than most other daytime serial actors. On May 11, 2023, Hall's 5,000th Episode aired on Peacock, an NBC streaming service that exclusively carries Days of Our Lives. The episode featured a flashback of her first episode when she met Mickey Horton.

In 1995, Hall produced and starred in Never Say Never: The Deidre Hall Story, a made-for-TV movie about her personal struggles to become a mother. Her longtime Days co-star Suzanne Rogers (Maggie Horton) is featured in the program.

Since at least early 2009, Hall has occasionally guest-hosted Clout, a talk radio program syndicated through Air America Media. In 2010, Hall and her writing partner Lynne Bowman wrote Deidre Hall's Kitchen Closeup. In 2011, Hall guest-starred on the season finale of Lifetime's Drop Dead Diva. She and Drake Hogestyn reprised their roles as Marlena Evans and John Black on September 26, 2011.

Hall received a star on the Hollywood Walk of Fame in 2016.

In 2024, Hall played a fictionalized version of herself on the HBO Max series Hacks.

In 2026 Hall appeared as Dr. Chivers in a guest role on the Paramount+ series Star Trek: Strange New Worlds.

== Personal life ==
She has been married four times:

- William Hudson (May 6, 1966 – 1970)
- Keith Barbour (1972–1977), a singer
- Michael Dubelko (1987–1989), a producer and writer
- Steve Sohmer (December 31, 1991 – 2006), an author and screenwriter. Hall and Sohmer have two sons: David Atticus Sohmer and Tully Chapin Sohmer. Both were born via a surrogate mother known as "Robin B".

In between her marriages to Barbour and Dubelko, Hall dated Louisiana State Senator Ned Randolph in the early 1980s. She made several campaign appearances during Randolph's run for a seat in the United States House of Representatives in 1982, which he lost to incumbent Gillis William Long. She is close friends with General Hospital's Jane Elliot.

The Hall Family was one of the founding families of the town of Meriden, Connecticut, and Deidre is descended from two notable Halls. John Hall immigrated from England and settled in Boston in 1625. Another ancestor, Lyman Hall, was one of the signers of the Declaration of Independence.

== Filmography ==
Year	Title	Role	Notes
1970	San Francisco International Airport		Episode: "We Once Came Home to Parades"
1971	Night Gallery	Night Gallery	Episode: "Pickman's Model/The Dear Departed/An Act of Chivalry"
1972	Adventures of Nick Carter	Ivy Duncan	
1972	Adam-12	Nurse	Episode: "Lost and Found"
1972	The Streets of San Francisco	Bank Teller	Episode: "In the Midst of Strangers"
1972–1973	Emergency!	Nurse Sally Lewis	Recurring role, 6 episodes
1973–1975	The Young and the Restless	Barbara Anderson	Series regular
1974	Columbo	Receptionist	Episode: "Mind Over Mayhem"
1975	Kung Fu	Luisa	Episode: "Barbary House"
1975	Karen	Janet Bartel	Episode: "I Gave at the Office"
1975	S.W.A.T.	Diane	Episode: "Courthouse"
1976–1987, 1991–2009 & 2011–present	Days of Our Lives	Marlena Evans	Series regular
1976	The Krofft Supershow, (Segment: Electra Woman and Dyna Girl),	Lori / Electra Woman	Series regular; (Season 1 only, 16 episode segments)
1976	Joe Forrester		Episode: "Fire Power"
1976	Special Delivery	Gloria	
1980	Pray TV	Sarah of Nazareth	
1981	The Million Dollar Face	Barbara Sanderson	
1984	Hot Pursuit	Stephanie Wyler	Episodes: "Home Is the Heart: Part 1" & "Home Is the Heart: Part 2"
1984	Hotel	Maggie Dawson	Episode: "Transitions"
1985	A Reason to Live	Delores Stewart	
1986–1988	Our House	Jessica 'Jessie' Witherspoon	Series regular, 46 episodes
1988	Take My Daughters, Please	Nell	
1989	Wiseguy	Claudia Newquay	4 episodes
1989	Perry Mason: The Case of the All-Star Assassin	Linda Horton	
1990	Columbo	Dian Hunter	Episode: "Columbo Cries Wolf"
1990	Murder, She Wrote	Claudia Carboni / Jennifer Paige	Episode: "The Sicilian Encounter"
1991	And the Sea Will Tell	Muff Graham	
1991	For the Very First Time	Mrs. O'Neil	
1993	Night Sins	Marlena Evans	
1993	Woman on the Ledge	Quinn	
1995	OP Center	Kate Michaels	
1995	Women of the House	Herself	Episode: "Women in Film"
1995	Never Say Never: The Deidre Hall Story	Herself	
2011	Drop Dead Diva	Herself	Episode: "Change of Heart"
2013	Dating in the Middle Ages	Fiona Fleming	Web series
2014	Lucky in Love	Erin Billings	A Hallmark Channel Movie
2016	My Christmas Dream	Victoria	A Hallmark Channel Movie
2021-2022	Days of Our Lives: Beyond Salem	Marlena Evans	Miniseries
2021	Days of Our Lives: A Very Salem Christmas	Marlena Evans	Peacock Original Movie
2024	Hacks	Herself	Episode: "The Deborah Vance Christmas Spectacular"
2026	Star Trek: Strange New Worlds	Dr. Chivers	Episode: "Like Chronitons Through the Hourglass"

== Awards and nominations ==
=== Daytime Emmy Awards ===
Year	Award	Work	Result
1980	Daytime Emmy Award for Outstanding Supporting Actress in a Drama Series	Days of Our Lives	Nominated
1984	Daytime Emmy Award for Outstanding Lead Actress in a Drama Series	Days of Our Lives	Nominated
1985	Daytime Emmy Award for Outstanding Lead Actress in a Drama Series	Days of Our Lives	Nominated

=== Soapy Awards ===
Year	Award	Work	Result
1982	Soapy Award for Best Actress	Days of Our Lives	Won
1983	Soapy Award for Best Actress	Days of Our Lives	Won

=== Soap Opera Digest Awards ===
Year	Award	Work	Result
1984	Soap Opera Digest Award for Outstanding Lead Actress in a Daytime Drama	Days of Our Lives	Won
1985	Soap Opera Digest Award for Outstanding Lead Actress in a Daytime Drama	Days of Our Lives	Won
1986	Soap Opera Digest Award for Outstanding Contribution by an Actor/Actress to the Form of Continuing Drama who is currently on a Daytime Serial	Days of Our Lives	Won
1995	Soap Opera Digest Award for Outstanding Lead Actress in a Daytime Drama	Days of Our Lives	Won
1996	Soap Opera Digest Award for Outstanding Lead Actress in a Daytime Drama	Days of Our Lives	Nominated
1998	Soap Opera Digest Award for Hottest Romance shared with Drake Hogestyn	Days of Our Lives	Nominated
1999	Soap Opera Digest Award for Outstanding Lead Actress in a Daytime Drama	Days of Our Lives	Nominated
2005	Soap Opera Digest Award for Outstanding Lead Actress in a Daytime Drama	Days of Our Lives	Nominated
2005	Soap Opera Digest Award for Favorite Couple shared with Drake Hogestyn	Days of Our Lives	Won

=== TV Land Awards ===
Year	Award	Work	Result
2005	TV Land Award for Superest Super Hero shared with Judy Strangis	Electra Woman and Dyna Girl	Nominated
