= Sami Brady and EJ DiMera =

- Alison Sweeney and James Scott as Sami Brady and EJ DiMera
- Duration: 2006–2014; 2018–2022
- Introduced by: Ken Corday; Stephen Wyman
In-universe information
- Other names: EJami
- Family: Brady; DiMera
- Spouse: 2007–2008; 2014–2022
- Children: Will Horton; Allie Horton; Johnny DiMera; Sydney Grace DiMera; Sydney DiMera; Daniel Rafe DiMera; Grace Brady (legal)

Elvis "EJ" Aaron DiMera and Samantha "Sami" Gene Brady DiMera (also known by the portmanteau EJami for EJ and Sami) are fictional characters and a supercouple from the American soap opera Days of Our Lives. Since 1993, the role of Sami Brady has been portrayed by actress Alison Sweeney. James Scott originally portrayed the role of EJ DiMera when the character was introduced on May 30, 2006, but in 2021 when EJ finally returns for the first time on-screen since his supposed death in 2014, he is now portrayed by actor Dan Feuerriegel. Scott says that his days of acting are now behind him.

The pairing is noted for a controversial storyline in which EJ is considered to have raped Sami. They are also noted for being a popular pairing.

== Storyline ==
=== 2006–2007 ===
EJ Wells, a famous European race car driver and entrepreneur, arrives in Salem and moves into the apartment across the hall from Sami Brady on 30 May 2006. The attraction between the handsome, charming Brit and Salem's resident bad girl is instantaneous and they quickly become good friends, despite her romantic relationship with Austin Reed at the time. Over that summer, EJ and Sami share a number of flirtatious exchanges and romantic moments. Ultimately, Sami leaves Austin at the altar to satisfy the person blackmailing her. She's also forced to give up custody of her son, Will, to her ex-fiancé, Lucas Horton. EJ promises her that he will always be there for her, and they kiss.

Shortly thereafter, Sami's secret is revealed when Lucas finds a blackmail note that was intended for Sami. Sami become estranged from her family. At the same time, EJ is revealed (to the audience) to be Patrick Lockhart's boss and the mastermind behind the so-called "gloved hand" crimes that have rocked Salem over the previous few months. The authorities are onto EJ. When EJ discovers that someone has searched his apartment, he realizes that Sami was involved. He goes to Sami's apartment and kisses her. Sami pulls away, and EJ's suspicions are confirmed. Lucas walks in before the situation can escalate further and warns EJ to stay away from Sami. EJ calls Sami a "tease" and tells her that he's seen her "true colors". A few days later, Sami meets EJ in the hall, and he apologizes for his behavior. Sami forgives him. Sami later realizes that EJ is not who he says he is and that he is connected to her family's long-time enemy, Stefano DiMera. Sami learns that EJ is Stefano's son and that the police believe that he is behind the "black glove" crimes, which have been perpetrated upon members of her family, the Bradys. She agrees to help the police set up a trap for EJ. She meets with EJ and makes plans to meet at an old boathouse outside of town on Boxing Day. EJ plays along with her, but when she leaves, it is clear that he is suspicious of her story and her motives."

EJ goes to the boathouse on Boxing Day and shoots John Black, as per his father's orders, and flees. In the meantime, Sami drives out of town with Lucas on a ski trip. After their car breaks down on a deserted mountain road, they seek shelter in a cabin. However, the roof caves in, and Lucas is trapped beneath a beam. Sami goes to the road and flags down an approaching car for help. The driver turns out be EJ, who agrees to help Lucas if Sami helps him get through the roadblock. Sami assists EJ, but he then declines to help Lucas and states that the only thing that would persuade him to delay his escape is if Sami has sex with him, explaining that one of his missions in Salem is to "plant the DiMera seed" in a Brady of his choosing. Sami agrees to EJ's bargain. EJ reciprocates by shifting the beam off Lucas before leaving.

EJ later returns to Salem to clear his name and resume his former life. Sami visits him at the police station to assure him that she's kept their secret. EJ is cleared of all charges due to insufficient evidence and released. He hires Sami's then-boyfriend, Lucas, to work for his company. Sami realizes that she is pregnant and that she doesn't know who has fathered her baby - EJ or Lucas. EJ eventually figures out that Sami is pregnant and demands an amniocentesis to determine the paternity of the baby. Sami presents EJ with fake test results, which name Lucas as the father. EJ is disappointed, but he still feels that they have a connection. Familiar with Sami's history of tampering with paternity tests, he breaks into the hospital lab and finds out that the test was not performed. EJ apologizes on several occasions and refers to what he did as vile and inhuman. He uses the word "rape" in one of his apologies. He does everything he can to earn back Sami's trust and saves her life on several occasions. Meanwhile, Sami, Lucas, and EJ find out that she's carrying twins.

Later, EJ and Sami scheme together, and it seems as though EJ is being redeemed. Sami is shown to trust him a little bit more than she did before, although she does not forgive him for what he did. The origin of the DiMera vendetta against the Brady family, said to have begun with a forbidden affair between Santo DiMera and Colleen Brady, who look exactly like EJ and Sami, begins to reveal itself. Once the terms for ending the DiMera vendetta are revealed, and that EJ and Sami must marry, EJ reminds Sami of what is at stake if they don't marry. When Sami decides not to go through with the terms, EJ points out that her family is in danger. Sami calls EJ to come to the pub and, again, discuss their possible marriage and her annulment from Lucas. While EJ is with Sami at the pub, Sami's stepfather, John, is killed in a hit-and-run. Sami assumes that John was killed because of her decision not to marry EJ. Sami agrees to divorce Lucas and marry EJ.

On October 23, 2007, Sami gives birth to her twins at her mother, Marlena Evans' house and agrees to have a new DNA test done on the twins. While the test is being performed, Sami leaves for Santo Domingo to divorce Lucas and leaves the twins with Steve Johnson and Kayla Brady. EJ learns, before Sami, that he is the father of the boy, John Roman. After Sami and Lucas return from Santo Domingo, EJ stops by Sami and Lucas' apartment and explains that he has made arrangements to marry Sami the following night. Sami protests but eventually agrees. On November 8, 2007, Sami and EJ are married. As Father Kelly pronounces them "husband and wife", three gunshots are heard. EJ is struck in the back by one of the bullets and cannot feel his legs. Sami holds vigil at the hospital with Stefano. Later, Stefano tells EJ that he is paralyzed and they don't know if it is permanent. EJ is devastated. Sami arrives at the hospital in time to witness EJ crying in Stefano's arms. Lucas reveals that he shot EJ. On December 21, Sami leaves EJ and tells him she wants a divorce, though EJ still wants to make things right. Lucas confesses and is sent to prison for shooting EJ, who makes a full recovery.

=== 2008 ===
On January 11, EJ turns on his father when he tells Sami, Marlena, Bo, and Hope that John is not dead but is being held by Stefano. EJ and Sami go into witness protection to hide from Stefano. They plan to get a divorce when EJ discovers that he might be deported back to England. Sami and EJ decide to move in together to prove to the immigrations officer that they are a loving family so that EJ will be able to stay in the country. Though it comes to light that this was an elaborate ruse orchestrated by EJ to maintain the status quo with Sami and the children, EJ is extremely moved to overhear Sami tell the imposter immigration officer that he would be lucky if he found someone who "loves him half as much as EJ loves me". During this time, EJ, law degree in hand and with a renewed interest in turning over a new leaf, joins Mickey Horton's firm. He takes on his first case, despite John and Sami's objections, representing Sami's longtime rival, Nicole Walker.

On May 15, 2008, EJ and Sami hash out their feelings over what happened the night Johnny was conceived. Sami declared that it is time that the slate between them is wiped clean. EJ asks Sami if she can really put the night of Johnny's conception behind them, and Sami says yes. After their conversation is interrupted by a tipsy Nicole barging into the mansion and demanding to see EJ, Sami pulls EJ into a kiss. This leads to the couple making love on May 18. Due to a misunderstanding, Lucas is released from prison early and, despite having told Sami that she should move on, is livid when he discovers her in bed with EJ.

Sami and EJ's marriage is annulled, but not before EJ begs Sami to be honest and admit that she has feelings for him. She tearfully admits that she does. EJ tries to move on with Nicole, but it is clear from the start that his feelings for Sami. Nicole ends up pregnant, and Sami finds out she is also pregnant with EJ's child but decides to keep the information to herself, jealous of EJ and Nicole's relationship. Sami continues to keep her pregnancy a secret, despite Lucas insisting that Sami tell "the man she loves" that she's going to have his baby.

Sami attempts to tell EJ about her pregnancy on October 17. While standing on the DiMera mansion's doorstep, Sami spies EJ and Nicole together through the window. Moments later, she witnesses Salem's mayor being assassinated. Following the assassination, EJ rescues Sami from a sniper, after which she agrees to go into the Witness Protection program. Sami is devastated that she has to leave her children behind and is heartbroken that she isn't allowed to bring pictures of the kids with her. EJ, however, slips pictures of Johnny and Allie into her luggage. Sami and EJ, despite being separated, still show signs of longing for each other.

=== 2009–2010 ===
After having a miscarriage, Nicole, having discovered that Sami is carrying EJ's child, fakes the third trimester of her pregnancy by wearing a rubber baby belly to hold onto EJ. She makes a deal with Mia, a pregnant teenage girl, to take the infant once it's born and raise it as her own. Nicole decides to switch Mia's baby with Sami's. The baby switch is a success, with Sami bringing home baby Grace Rafaela, and Nicole bringing EJ and Sami's daughter back to the mansion, naming her Sydney Anne DiMera. Sami is now involved with Rafe Hernandez, the FBI agent assigned to protect her. Grace is rushed to the hospital, and on June 9, she dies from complications of meningitis. Sami, devastated by the death of the baby she believed was her biological daughter, lashes out at EJ, coming clean about hiding the pregnancy from him. Eventually, tensions ease between the two with the help of a guilt-stricken Nicole. Sami shows remorse for her actions, and EJ reveals to Lexie that he still has feelings for Sami. EJ asks Sami to visit Grace's grave with him. Sami shares her pregnancy story and apologizes to EJ about not telling him about Grace, asking for forgiveness. After they comfort each other at Grace's graveside, EJ leaves Sami, giving her a kiss on the cheek.

EJ and Sami find themselves on the same side when the details of the baby switch are revealed, and they discover that Nicole has had their biological daughter this entire time. When Nicole is granted bail after being arrested, she kidnaps Sydney and goes on the run. However, she's intercepted by Anna DiMera, EJ's sister-in-law, who kidnaps Sydney from her. It's later revealed that Anna was hired by EJ to kidnap Sydney. However, he brings her back, looking like the hero to Sami. Sami and EJ grow closer over the summer of 2010. EJ proposes to Sami on July 30, and she accepts his proposal. Throughout the summer, EJ goes to great lengths to keep the secret behind Sydney's kidnapping hidden from Sami. Nicole records a conversation between EJ and Stefano during which he confesses to staging the kidnapping, and she blackmails him with it. Rafe gets his hands on the CD containing EJ's confession. Rafe shows up at the mansion in time to stop Sami and EJ's wedding, and a heartbroken Sami leaves EJ at the altar, packing up the children and moving out of the mansion. When Sami finds out he was planning to take the children away, she goes to his house to confront him and finds him passed out and drunk. She pulls a gun out of his hand and shoots him in the head with it.

EJ recovers, shocking everyone by breathing on his own after he is taken off life support. On October 14, EJ admits to Stefano that he still loves Sami, and that he believes that if she shot him, he got what he deserved. Eventually, though, EJ sets out to prove that Sami was the shooter, as it becomes clear to him that it's the only way that he will ever be able to see his children again. Rafe's sister, Arianna, gets a recording of Sami confessing to the shooting, but before she can bring it to EJ, she is killed by a hit-and-run driver. The recording ends up with her fiancé, Brady Black, and found by Nicole, who blackmails Rafe and Sami with it so she can spend more time with Sydney. However, she later brings it to EJ, asking for time with Sydney in return. EJ brings the recording to Sami and blackmails her into giving up Johnny and Sydney on the day she marries Rafe. However, when Johnny is diagnosed with eye cancer and has to have an eye removed, EJ lets Sami be there and decides to let her be a part of the children's lives again.

=== 2011–2012 ===
After Johnny's surgery, EJ notices that he is very attached to Rafe. He asks for Stefano's help in getting rid of that. When Rafe ends up unconscious after a car accident, he and Stefano switch him out with a surgically altered imposter to ruin Sami's marriage and get Rafe out of his children's lives. Sami attributes the changes in Rafe's behavior to the car accident. Meanwhile, EJ marries Nicole again but realizes that he's also fallen in love with her sister, Taylor. EJ and Taylor sneak around behind Nicole's back after Taylor moves into the DiMera mansion with EJ and Nicole. Nicole and Taylor's mother, Fay, also moves in, and finds out about the imposter Rafe. Unfortunately, soon after, Fay is killed by the imposter to keep a secret. EJ begins to doubt his plan to hire the imposter.

Sami eventually figures out the truth, and brings the real Rafe back, while locking up the imposter. Rafe initially has no memory of Sami, but is able to regain it. EJ has decided to leave Nicole for Taylor, but Nicole blackmails him with the fact that she knows what EJ and Stefano did to Rafe. EJ proposes to Taylor, but before things go any further, Stefano and EJ are both exposed, and arrested for the imprisonment of Rafe, as well the murder of Fay Walker. Taylor finds out about EJ's involvement in her mother's death, breaks up with him and mends her relationship with Nicole. After Johnny finds out that his father and grandfather were arrested, he shuns EJ. When the imposter is killed, both Stefano and EJ are released, but EJ feels dejected over losing his children's love. Realizing the extent of the damage he has caused, EJ tries to make amends by giving up his parental rights, and giving full custody to Sami.

EJ decides to stay married to Nicole and fixes his relationship with his children and Sami. He decides to run for mayor against his brother-in-law, Abe Carver. However, he frames John Black for embezzlement and when Sami tries to help her step-father, she gets caught in a shootout aimed at John. Afterwards, Johnny disappears, and EJ and Sami try to find him. A report is broadcast, saying Johnny's body was found. In their grief and anger, EJ and Sami sleep together. However, the news report wasn't correct and Johnny is found alive by Rafe. EJ and Sami decide to keep their one-night stand a secret. However, Will saw them together and holds it over their heads for months. When he tries to blackmail EJ, he turns the tables on Will and reveals that he knows that Will, not Lucas, shot him at his wedding to Sami in 2007.

Will ends up working for EJ, to Sami's disapproval. Meanwhile, Rafe finds out about Sami and EJ sleeping together, and also reveals this to Nicole. Both couples file for divorce, as a result. EJ tries to fix his relationship with Nicole, while Sami begins confiding in Lucas. Meanwhile, Rafe and Nicole grow close, to Sami and EJ's dismay. When Nicole finds out that she is pregnant, she decides not to tell EJ about the baby. However, EJ finds out and Rafe claims that he is the father to protect Nicole. Sami starts a relationship with Lucas when she finds out about the baby. She and Lucas also deal with the fact that Will is gay, and EJ also supports her and Will. However, that summer, Stefano is killed and EJ becomes the primary suspect. Will ends up trying to prove his innocence and Sami later joins in when she realizes EJ was framed. She and EJ go on the run as fugitives, and share a kiss while in hiding. EJ is later exonerated when it's revealed that Stefano is alive, and Ian McAllister framed EJ. Tired of being strung along by her, Lucas dumps Sami when she returns to town. Sami and EJ grow close, but Sami also begins making amends with Rafe. As the year draws to an end, Sami realizes she needs to make a decision between Rafe and EJ, and she decides she wants to be with Rafe.

=== 2013–2014 ===
Sami keeps putting off telling EJ her decision, especially after EJ tells Sami he's fallen in love with her again. Meanwhile, Rafe's pregnant younger sister, Gabi, marries her boyfriend, Nick Fallon. Rafe and Sami are planning to have their wedding soon after. However, at the ceremony, it's revealed that Nick is not the father of Gabi's baby. Sami finds out that Will is actually the father, and thinks Gabi purposely tried to keep Will out of his child's life. Rafe defends his sister, while Sami defends Will, and the two break up. EJ finds out about this, and is waiting at Sami's home when she comes back, giving her a shoulder to lean on. Eventually, Sami comes clean to EJ about wanting to leave him for Rafe but explains that she wants him back and is willing to wait for him. EJ wants to still be with her, and they reunite in early February.

Sami wants to make sure Will is part of his daughter's life and argues with Rafe and Gabi about this. Nick is furious with Sami. He demands Will sign away his rights to the baby or risk getting sent to jail along with his family. Will agrees, and Sami is heartbroken, as well as EJ, who has grown close to Will. The two decide to find a way to make the evidence disappear. Sami, desperate, decides to ask Stefano for help to make the evidence disappear. To this end, she and EJ move into the DiMera mansion with their children. EJ proposes to Sami, and in April, they get engaged. Soon after, Stefano agrees to get rid of the police evidence against Will, and Sami and EJ believe they are in the clear when they get rid of Nick's recording of Will's confession. However, Sami realizes that Stefano is double-crossing them, and she and EJ try to stop him.

Meanwhile, Gabi gives birth to Arianna Grace after Will rescues her and Nick from a vicious attack. However, Will is shot while trying to rescue Nick but eventually recovers. Sami witnesses a man trying to kill a comatose Rafe at the hospital and shoots him to protect Rafe. The man is revealed to be a Salem PD officer, but EJ and Sami know the officer was Stefano's mole. The officer dies, and the weapon he was holding goes missing from the hospital room. With no evidence to back her claim, Sami is charged with the murder of an officer, and EJ tries to prove her innocence.

Sami and EJ get married, but Sami only married him for revenge as she finds out about his affair with Abigail Deveraux. She has known for weeks and has set EJ up to send him to prison for 10 years, denying bail for tax evasion. Sami is now co-CEO of DiMera Enterprises, teaming up with Kate Roberts, to take out Stefano and EJ, while she makes Abigail's life miserable in revenge for her affair with EJ.

After weeks of Sami plotting against EJ, EJ begins to make progress with reconciling with her. One of the major steps he takes is turning in additional evidence against his father, Stefano to Rafe, which would protect Sami and the children by preventing Stefano from returning to Salem. Sami confesses to EJ that she still loves him and they reconcile. Shortly thereafter, EJ tells Sami he is the luckiest man alive. EJ meets with new arrival and rival drug lord Clyde Weston at a private business meeting in the woods. EJ and Clyde have an argument and EJ punches Clyde. EJ's bodyguard Miguel shoots EJ. Sami hears a gunshot while walking around in the woods looking for EJ. After Clyde and Miguel cover up what had happened, Sami stumbles upon EJ lying on the ground shot. When Rafe and the paramedics arrive, EJ is pronounced dead. Sami refuses to believe EJ is dead and follows his body to the hospital. At the hospital, Sami visits EJ in the morgue and remembers her life with EJ. She cries uncontrollably when she lays her head on EJ's chest and doesn't hear a heartbeat, finally realizing that EJ is dead. The last scene to show EJ showed his sister Kristen, under orders from Stefano, sneak into the morgue and inject an unknown substance into EJ's body. The purpose of this remains unknown other than Stefano telling Kristen "time is of the essence".

In October 2015, Marlena gave Sami a letter that was sent to her in the event of EJ's death. Sami became overwhelmed with hope that EJ was alive. She went to Switzerland, and discovered a flash drive that could bring Stefano down. She stole all of Stefano's liquid assets and went on the run with her three surviving children; also hoping to find EJ alive.

=== 2018–2019 ===
In 2018 it is revealed EJ is alive after his sister Kristen held him captive for several years. Sami reveals that Kristen had EJ at her mother Marlena & step-father John's wedding, but Kristen demands that Sami shoot Marlena in a exchange for EJ's whereabouts. Sami gets into a fight with her twin brother, Eric, and misfires a shot at Marlena as a result. Marlena survives at the hospital with John by her side. Meanwhile, with Sami's whole family mad at what she did, her brother Eric decides to go with her to find EJ . They arrive there and discover Sami's enemy Nicole at the door and staying in the town where EJ was believed to be at. Nicole agrees to search for EJ when she is caught in a deadly plot by Kristen, unfortunately leaving Eric heartbroken over Nicole's "death". Sami was successful in finding EJ at an unknown clinic where Kristen stashed him, in Dr.Rolf's lab, but The lab was burnt down while Sami rescued EJ, leaving him covered in bandages due to the burns and in a coma due to the drugs in his system from being a lab rat for Dr.Rolf, which was by Kristen's orders. Sami was so happy to see EJ, he was in a wheelchair, as they had an emotional reunion. She brings him home, where he can be treated at the local hospital, and Sami agrees with his mother, Susan, that he needs to take a DNA test to make sure this was really EJ. Kayla performs the test and confirmed that it was in fact EJ. Sami celebrates with happy tears as she sits bedside by her husband. Then one day Susan comes in his hospital room and tries to pull the plug on him and Sami stops her. They agree to send him to Italy for treatment at a hospice center and Sami leaves town with EJ.

=== 2020 ===
Sami comes back to town to find Nicole alive and married to her twin brother, Eric. She is revealed to be a grandmother after her daughter Allie becomes pregnant. She later claims Nicole tried to hide her grandson from her, which wasn't true. During this time Sami revealed her life with EJ after she left town and revealed that Johnny and Sydney are with him, along with his mother, Susan, who is looking after him for his hospice care. Sami is addressed as Mrs. Sami DiMera in her custody battle over her grandson with Eric and Nicole, whom she had been fighting with as well. Sami even got restraining orders against them which were eventually lifted when Sami won custody of her grandson and wanted to allow them to say goodbye to him. Sami moved back into the DiMera mansion where her and EJ stayed to raise her grandson. She apologizes to John about causing his heart attack but John doesn't accept her apology and she just walks out. She went back to the DiMera mansion and saw Lucas and Nicole there, with Nicole holding her grandson, and she was not happy. Fortunately, Allie arrived at the home and stopped Sami from reacting any further. It was then revealed on September 21 that EJ is out of the hospice center and is at home in Rome with Sydney and Johnny looking after him. They have servants there to take care of the home. Allie dislikes the idea of her son being there around EJ and his kids because she thinks her mother, Sami, would spend more time taking care of EJ than with her son. It was revealed that Allie was raped by Steve Johnson's son, Tripp Dalton, which resulted in her pregnancy. Later, after the rape scandal, we learn that Tripp was not Allie's rapist, but it was in fact his brother, Charlie Dale (son of Ava Vitali). Sami is very mad at Allie for returning without a care for her son, and Allie even tried to take her grandson away and have the custody thrown out. Later that day Sami's twin brother, Eric, announces he’s leaving town for missionary work. He ends up getting angry at Sami before he leaves ends up slamming the door on her as he says goodbye to Nicole. Kate wasn’t okay with Sami taking her great grandson to Italy and tries to stop her. On September 25, Sami left town without her grandson and feels heartbroken but has to get back to EJ and take care of him.

=== 2021 ===
Sami returns to Salem in 1Q21 (without EJ) after having been gone for a few months. One night, Sami confides in ex-husband Lucas Roberts that she is unhappy in her relationship with EJ, claiming he has been distant and thinks that he has fallen out of love with her. The two end up in bed together after their heart-to-heart. Meanwhile, Kristen DiMera has been masquerading as Susan Banks after convincing her to switch places with her in Statesville so that she can keep tabs on then-boyfriend Brady Black's friendship with past lover Chloe Lane. While pretending to be Susan, Kristen learns of Sami and Lucas' affair. After Sami discovers Kristen's true identity, Kristen first blackmails her into keeping her identity a secret by threatening to tell EJ that Sami cheated on him. She instructs Sami to help her come between Brady and Chloe in any way possible, to which Sami suggests trying to set Chloe up with Lucas by telling Chloe that Lucas has cancer and "wants to spend the last of his days with her." Eventually, after their plan fails, Kristen decides that it would be easier just to kidnap Sami and Lucas. While being held captive in the tunnels underneath the DiMera mansion, Sami and Lucas fear for their lives and again turn to one another for comfort. After they are rescued Sami stresses over having cheated on EJ twice now with Lucas, who professes his love for her and asks her to leave EJ to try and give their past marriage another chance. Just as this is happening, EJ arrives in Salem (now played by Dan Feuerriegel) and knocks on Sami's door, interrupting their conversation and leaving Sami confused. Sami ultimately rejects Lucas and moves back into the DiMera mansion with EJ, who becomes co-CEO of DiMera Enterprises alongside his brother, Chad DiMera. However, Sami’s long-time enemy Nicole Walker spills the beans to EJ about Sami's affair with Lucas. After confronting the pair, EJ kicks Sami out of the mansion and says he cannot forgive her. Sami vows to try to repair her marriage even as Lucas plots to win her back, so she heads to the Hernandez residence to convince Gabi Hernandez to let her stay in the mansion (at the time, Gabi was in control of the DiMera estate but was not living there). As she was knocking on their door, Sami was sedated by chloroform by an unknown attacker and kidnapped. At the scene, her necklace was left and found by Gabi, who unknowingly started wearing it. Shortly after Thanksgiving several months later, EJ recognizes the necklace on Gabi while out on a date with ex-wife Nicole (having gifted it to Sami) and tries to piece together why Sami would leave town after going to such desperate lengths to attempt to stay in the mansion. Gabi recalls that Sami never actually made it inside to see her, leaving the group even more puzzled. Meanwhile, Sami manages to knock out one of the guards keeping her prisoner, tie him up, and steal his cell phone. She calls EJ while he was out with Nicole in the same scenario above, but the connection was bad and he could not hear her but says that he could have sworn it was Sami on the line. Sami then decides to first try calling her mother, Marlena Evans (possessed again by the Devil) and eventually gets ahold of Lucas and sends him her GPS location from the phone. He arrives to her rescue and the two drill the guard, Jason, demanding to know the name of the person behind her kidnapping. Unfortunately, Jason manages to escape their clutches before revealing any information. Lucas then brings Sami back to Salem, reuniting her with her loved ones. Upon her return Sami and EJ reconcile their relationship; however, it is short-lived. After it is revealed that Lucas was the one who was behind Sami’s kidnapping (a so-called “act of love”), he successfully frames EJ for the crime with the help of Chad by forging a paper trail of funds that had been sent to Jason through an account from DiMera Enterprises. After Lucas shows the evidence to Sami, the two leave town together while EJ is arrested for her kidnapping.

=== 2022 ===
Due to lack of evidence, EJ gets released from prison and cleared of all charges. While most of Salem still believed that EJ was guilty of kidnapping Sami, only two people knew the truth: Kate Roberts and Chad DiMera. While EJ was getting hot and heavy with Sami’s sister Belle Brady, Lucas proposes to Sami and the two get engaged. Prior to their engagement, Lucas fell off the wagon one night after discovering that Abigail DiMera found out his secret and woke up the next day with a wounded hand and no recollection of his adventures from the night before. When news breaks town that Abigail was murdered in the DiMera mansion the same night that Lucas got wasted, he fears that he did it and that that was how he ended up with his injury. At Sami and Lucas’s wedding the next week, Chad interrupts just before they were about to say ‘I do’ and accuses Lucas of murdering Abigail in front of everyone. Lucas denies at first, then admits that he framed EJ for the kidnapping, and eventually admits to the kidnapping as well. Devastated, Sami storms out of the church and rushes to the DiMera mansion to tell EJ that she was wrong about him while Lucas is escorted to the police station. Sami ends up at EJ’s bedroom door (because no one locks their front doors apparently) while he is in bed with Belle. Belles hides and EJ lets Sami in, who discovers Belle’s bra and immediately concludes that Nicole is the one hiding in the bathroom. EJ holds Sami back as she tries to get to the bathroom while shouting insults, which strikes a nerve with Belle, who bursts out of the bathroom and reveals herself to spite Sami. Disgusted, Sami warns Belle that EJ is only sleeping with her to get back at her and struts out of the room, followed closely by EJ. After catching up to Sami, EJ demands Sami tell him why she came to the mansion on the night of her wedding, and Sami gets emotional admits to him that he was right and that Lucas was the one who kidnapped her.

=== 2025 ===
In April, Sami returns to Salem to comfort her and EJ’s son, Johnny, who just learned the truth about his conception from Kate DiMera after her husband, Roman, let it slip that EJ is a “rapist”. Devastated to learn that he is a product of rape, Johnny confronts his father by punching him in the face and vowing to never speak to him again. Shortly after, EJ gets shot and put into a medically induced coma. At the time, EJ was in a back-and-forth love affair with Sami’s sister, Belle. Belle visits EJ in his hospital room and confesses her love for him, and of course Sami enters at that exact moment and tells Belle that she can have her leftovers. Belle leaves Sami to have a moment alone with EJ, and Sami starts talking to herself out loud asking EJ how she’s going to tell Johnny the truth when, of course, Johnny enters. The two have a long heart-to-heart in EJ’s hospital room while he is unconscious, but nevertheless it does not change Johnny’s mind about never talking to his father again. While in Salem, Sami stops by ex-husband Rafe Hernandez’s house to thank him for talking to Johnny and ask him if he thinks Johnny could have been the one who shot EJ, to which he responds no. The two end up in bed together, effectively ruining Rafe’s relationship with then-fiance, Jada Hunter. Sami leaves town the next day, with rumors pointing toward her return once more later this year.

== Reception ==
EJ and Sami's relationship has been recognized as a top couple to view by Sympatico/MSN/TV Guide. The pairing won Best Couple in Soap Opera Digest's Hot Off The Net poll, published the week of September 17, 2007, and their portrayers won the Best Actor and Best Actress honors in the same poll the week of September 10, 2007.

In a September 10, 2007 Soap Opera Weekly interview with Bryan Dattilo, portrayer of Days of our Lives' Lucas Roberts, the popularity and appeal of the EJ and Sami storyline was discussed. The interviewer stated that Soap Opera Weekly receives more fan mail from EJ and Sami fans than from Lucas and Sami fans. When asked if he would be okay if Sami and EJ became a supercouple, Dattilo responded, "Yeah. I think Sami and EJ have the ability to be a supercouple like Luke and Laura." EJ and Sami's popularity has proved formidable to rival couple Lucas and Sami.

There is debate among viewers over whether or not what EJ did to Sami in the December 29, 2006, episode (see above) could be considered rape. In a May 3, 2007, interview, actor James Scott, portrayer of EJ, was interviewed by Sympatico/MSN/TV Guide about the subject:

I don't think they handled the rape very well, and I'll tell you why. EJ raped Sami, and then afterwards, he's hanging out in her house — alone with her. It's irresponsible on so many levels. However, had it been handled well, I think it would have been an interesting story choice. Now the story focus has shifted to her pregnancy and the classic soap story of paternity. Having said that, I chose to believe that EJ is in love with Samantha — he just can't communicate it.

In an article about the Santo DiMera/Colleen Brady storyline in the July 17, 2007, edition of Soap Opera Digest, Days of our Lives former Co-Executive Producer Stephen Wyman referred to the December 29, 2006, incident between EJ and Sami as rape. "Naturally, we don't expect anyone to forget about the rape, nor do we expect anyone to take EJ's rape of Sami lightly. However, we know life goes on. People can change," he said. "At some point, the issue of the rape is going to have to be dealt with in the fundamental way, but meanwhile, there is the audience that wants to see EJ and Sami together. [But] they aren't forgetting about the rape, either." The article is about the Santo/Colleen storyline, in which the actors, Alison Sweeney and James Scott, portray two characters from the past falling in love. Soap Opera Digest noted, "this story provides an opportunity for the actors to work together romantically in a less controversial tale."

In June 2007, Soap Opera Weekly printed an opinion column that addressed concerns that rape is being portrayed as romantic on soap operas. The author opined that soap operas such as General Hospital, Guiding Light and Days of our Lives (citing EJ and Sami) are portraying rape as romantic because these soap operas are seen to be pairing or considering to pair a female character with a character who raped her or with a character some viewers believe raped her. "Sorry folks. If daytime's most famous couple [Luke and Laura from General Hospital] cannot escape the horror of the campus disco after 28 years, how could GL's and Days' non-couples hope to gloss over sexual assaults that aired just recently? Do the soaps think audiences can forgive and forget so quickly?" stated the author. She added that the "chemistry is a great thing", but that she did not believe it was enough to overcome the controversial scenes, even though a "unique formula" gave Luke and Laura a "free pass" to allow them to become one of the most popular supercouples on daytime television.

== See also ==
- Supercouple
- List of supercouples
- List of soap opera villains
