= Chad DiMera =

- Days of Our Lives character
- Conner Floyd as Chad DiMera
- Portrayed by: Casey Deidrick (2009–2013); Billy Flynn (2014–2026); Conner Floyd (since 2026)
- Duration: 2009–present
- First appearance: June 19, 2009
- Created by: Dena Higley and Christopher Whitesell
- Introduced by: Ken Corday and Gary Tomlin (2009); Ken Corday, Lisa de Cazotte and Greg Meng (2014, 2019); Ken Corday and Noel Maxam (2026)
- Spin-off appearances: Chad and Abby in Paris (2019); Days of Our Lives: Beyond Salem (2021); Days of Our Lives: A Very Salem Christmas (2021)
- Casey Deidrick as Chad DiMera

- Billy Flynn as Chad DiMera
In-universe information
- Other names: Chad Peterson; Chad Peterson-Woods; Charles Michael DiMera
- Occupation: Club owner; Business executive; Model; Website designer
- Family: DiMera
- Parents: Stefano DiMera; Madeline Peterson Woods
- Half-brothers: André DiMera; Tony DiMera (legal); Peter Blake (adoptive); Benjy Hawk; EJ DiMera; Stefan DiMera; Jake Lambert
- Half-sisters: Kristen DiMera (adoptive); Renée DuMonde; Megan Hathaway; Lexie Carver
- Spouse: Abigail Deveraux (2016–2022) (Note: Chad and Abigail Deveraux were married three times: 2016–2017, 2017–2018, and 2019–2022.); Cat Greene (2024)
- Children: Grace Brady; Thomas DiMera; Charlotte DiMera
- Grandfathers: Santo DiMera
- Uncles: Ryan Brady
- Nieces and nephews: Dimitri Von Leuschner; Theo Carver; Steven Hawk; Johnny DiMera; Sydney DiMera; Rachel Black (adoptive)

Chad DiMera is a fictional character from the American soap opera Days of Our Lives. Created by Dena Higley and Christopher Whitesell, the character was portrayed by Casey Deidrick from Chad's introduction in 2009 until 2013 and by Billy Flynn from 2014 to 2026. In 2025, Conner Floyd was recast in the role, and Chad returned on April 21, 2026.

Introduced in 2009 as Chad Peterson, Chad is the troubled ex-boyfriend of Mia McCormick (Taylor Spreitler) and father to their daughter, Grace Brady. Chad factors into a romantic triangle between himself, Mia and her new boyfriend, Will Horton. After the baby storyline, then executive producer Gary Tomlin fought to keep the actor and the character on canvas. In 2010, the series introduced Chad's parents, including his mother, Madeline Peterson Woods (Jessica Tuck) and Chad is revealed to be the illegitimate son of crime boss Stefano DiMera (Joseph Mascolo). Chad struggles to accept his new family but eventually forms strong bonds with his father, sister Lexie Carver (Renée Jones) and brother, EJ DiMera (James Scott/Dan Feuerriegel).

Chad is also known for his relationships with Abigail Deveraux (Kate Mansi/Marci Miller) and Melanie Jonas (Molly Burnett), and his friendship with gay supercouple, Will Horton and Sonny Kiriakis. In 2012, Chad takes a dark turn when he feuds with Gabi Hernandez, blaming her for his failed engagement to Melanie. Chad later reconnects with Abigail and the romance develops into a triangle with Cameron Davis (Nathan Owens). The relationship ends when Chad lies about being terminally ill and the character is written out of the series in October 2013. Chad returned in 2014, and immediately mixes it up in the business world, partnering with Kate Roberts (Lauren Koslow) and works secretly alongside his father. He is the youngest surviving member in his generation of the DiMera family. He is also one half of the supercouple Chad and Abigail, also known as Chabby to fans as well as the media.

== Creation ==
=== Casting ===
The casting and character was announced in late May 2009. Casey Deidrick had joined the cast as Chad. Deidrick revealed in an interview that he originally auditioned for the role of Tad. Despite very positive feedback, Brendan Coughlin was cast in the role of Tad. Deidrick's audition caught the attention of casting director, Marnie Saitta and he was soon called back to audition for the newly created role of Chad. Deidrick tested opposite Taylor Spreitler, whom he had previously met through a mutual friend. Deidrick learned a few weeks later that he had won the role and signed the standard four-year contract. In the spring of 2013, the series released a casting call for an actor matching Deidrick's description which led to speculation that the role of Chad was to be recast. At the time, Deidrick's screen time had declined dramatically and he had also booked several guest appearances in prime time. On June 20, 2013, Deidrick confirmed his departure from the series through Twitter and posted a picture of his final script. Deidrick's last air date was October 30, 2013. Michael Fairman revealed that Deidrick made the decision to leave the series earlier that year and also hinted at the possibility of the role being recast. Deidrick told Soap Opera Digest that he wouldn't be opposed to a decision to recast, if it happened. However, the actor also said he was open to return to the series for future guest stints. Of his departure, Deidrick said, "I basically wanted to pursue other opportunities." However, Deidrick was grateful for all he learned.

On August 12, 2014, the producers officially announced Flynn's casting to Soap Opera Digest; he made his first appearance on September 12, 2014. In May 2018, Flynn announced he would remain on the soap for the foreseeable future. However, Flynn departed on February 21, 2019. That May, it was announced that Flynn would reprise the role of Chad. Flynn returned on November 11, 2019. In March 2025, Flynn announced his decision to vacate the role; due to the serial's advanced taping schedule, he was seen as Chad until February 17, 2026. In an interview with Variety, Flynn cited his desire to try something new for why he left the role.

In June 2025, it was announced Conner Floyd had been cast in the role; he made his debut as Chad on April 21, 2026. In an interview with TV Insider, Floyd called his chance meeting with the serial's casting director Marnie Saitta, revealing: "She was like, 'What do you do at CBS?' I said, 'I'm on Young and the Restless.' After 12 hours of talking, she said, 'I'm gonna call you.' And that's kind of how this came into play."

=== Characterization ===
Deidrick had to come up with a lot of Chad's back story on his own because Chad was a brand new character. Deidrick initially described Chad as "confident, edgy" and "mysterious." He is very troubled, but because he means well, it is hard to decide if one hates him or loves him. He is also very persuasive and he is not easy to break. It is obvious that he has been through a lot. Deidrick hinted that Chad may suffer from abandonment issues. Deidrick who is in a metal rock band viewed the character of Chad as a rock star and notes the similarities between the character and the genre of music. Chad has a different way of thinking which sets him apart from the average person, similar to rock stars Deidrick revealed in an interview. Chad is a "bad boy" with a "care free" spirit. Chad puts on a hard exterior and acts as if he does not care what others think of him. However, Chad has another layer to him; he is "very sensitive" and all about romance which makes him all the more intriguing. Despite coming across as a bad guy, there is much more complexity to him.

== Development ==
=== Introduction ===
The character of Chad's introduction would cause trouble for the romantic pairing of Will Horton (Dylan Patton) and Mia McCormick (Taylor Spreitler). According to the actor, Chad is extremely sincere about getting custody of the baby from Nicole which is why he turns down her sexual advances. He refuses to let Mia "who has been lying to him this whole time get in his way." However, Deidrick commented that when Chad turns down Nicole, he is not "acting [his] age." Though he suspects Mia and Nicole are hiding something, Deidrick explained that Chad is completely blindsided when he finds the specifics. Of Chad's reaction to the baby reveal Deidrick said, "There's nothing that can really prepare you for something like that." However, what hurts the most is that Chad has spent so much time trying to win Mia back, and his love for her is actually "sincere." According to Deidrick, it is a "slap in the face," to learn that Mia has been lying about such a huge part of their lives. For Chad, the revelation allows him to see Mia's true colors. Deidrick stated that "[T]here's always going to be tension" between Chad and Mia but Deidrick maintained that despite her lies, Chad feels sorry what Mia has gone through and tries to stay by her side. "It's a very hard situation." Of his character during the storyline, Deidrick described Chad as a "kid who doesn't know what to do and he's a fighting all these feelings." Deidrick previewed that the reveal about the baby switch would put everything "into place." The actor admitted that the baby storyline kept him very isolated due to the significant age differences between himself and the rest of his teenage costars. When asked about a future love interest, Deidrick mentioned Gabriela Rodriguez who had recently been introduced to the canvas as Gabi Hernandez (Gabriela Rodriguez) but didn't believe a romantic pairing would work due to the age difference.

=== Chad's past and paternity reveal (2010) ===
In July 2009, Chad was scripted as the son of Bill and Marsha Peterson. In June 2009 it was announced that David Leisure had been cast in the recurring role of D.A. Woods. In October 2009, the character's name was revised to Chad Peterson Woods when D.A. Woods was revealed to be his father. In February 2010 Soap Opera Digest reported that veteran soap actress, Jessica Tuck, known for her role as One Life to Live's Megan Gordon was cast in the role of Chad's mother. Deidrick explained that Chad goes to Kate for answers because she has been a "mother figure." Both the actor and executive producer Gary Tomlin enjoyed Chad's scenes with Koslow's Kate. Chad immediately confronts Madeline and he is "completely devastated" when she admits to being a former prostitute. Chad is fed up with his mother's lies and just wants everything out on the table. The revelation really impacts him in an "inexplicable" way. Deidrick described Chad's reaction as "flabbergasted" and wants to get away from her. When Chad witnesses Madeline's fall, he freezes for a moment because he is unable to "process" the situation. Such tragedy could have the potential to screw him up. Because Deidrick did not know the pain of losing a parent, let alone his own mother, the actor does his best to portray Chad during the scenes; Deidrick's first reaction as Chad is going into denial. Chad clings on to the little bit of courage he has left hoping to work things out with Charles in the future. According to Deidrick, the aftermath of his mother's death and his confrontation with Charles makes Chad a little "cuckoo crazy." Knowing Chad is all alone in the world Kate schemes to expose that Chad is Madeline's son with Kate's husband, Stefano DiMera (Joseph Mascolo) born on March 3, 1990, making him a whole year older than was initially said to be. The storyline showcased two very distinct sides to Chad's personality. According to Deidrick, during scenes with Kate, he intentionally emphasized Chad's vulnerabilities due to his mother's recent death; he is in desperate need of a mother figure at the moment, and Kate fills that void. Chad does not show that side of his personality too often for fear of getting hurt. On the other hand, Chad's relationship with his new found father Stefano appears to be a bit more volatile. The nature of the relationship is first displayed in November 2010 when Chad confronts Stefano with a knife and demands blood for a DNA test. Chad has no idea how to react to the DNA results. According to Deidrick, "[Chad] struggles to find the courage to be able to love [Stefano] who had a relationship with his mother and never knew he existed." Deidrick explained that Chad rejects Stefano based on instinct. It is all he knows thanks to D.A. Woods who always pushes him away when things get difficult. However, Stefano is not easily turned away. Deidrick expected the role to be short lived thinking the character was only to wrap up the baby switch storyline. However, he accredited Gary Tomlin with fighting for the character and believing in him as an actor. Deidrick said that it was Tomlin's idea to attach him to a main family, "So they made [Chad] a DiMera."

=== Friendships with Will and Sonny ===
In the spring of 2011, Entertainment Weekly announced that the series had plans for a Gay storyline with one of the current characters. There was much speculation that Chandler Massey's Will Horton would be the character who turned out to be gay. Despite fan speculation about a romance, Chad and Will develop a great friendship. Deidrick revealed that "Chill" (Chad and Will) actually started off as a joke between himself and Massey. Deidrick admitted he would be open to the potential pairing if the writers were to go in that direction. However, the characters remain friends even after Will comes out about his sexuality. Deidrick revealed to Soaps In Depth that he was open to the story, if the writers were truly willing to take his character in that direction. Chad also develops a friendship with openly gay character, Sonny Kiriakis (Freddie Smith). Their relationship is so unique, not only because of Deidrick and Smith's real-life friendship, but also because Daytime rarely showcased a "best friend" type relationship between gay and straight characters. Deidrick stated that "Chad doesn't care" about Sonny's sexuality.

=== Early romance with Abigail (2011) ===
In January 2011, Soap Opera Digest reported that Abigail Deveraux (Kate Mansi) would be Chad's new love interest. Deidrick said he immediately connected to Mansi during her screen test. The writers teased the pairing throughout the spring of 2011 as Chad struggles to accept his new identity as a DiMera. According to Deidrick, Abigail is immediately turned off until she realizes that Chad is different from the rest of his family. Deidrick admitted that it was easy for him to work with Mansi due to the closeness in age. In an interview with TV Source Magazine from 2011, Mansi compared Chad and Abigail's dynamic to Romeo and Juliet. The duo shared an "instant attraction" but she distances herself because he is a DiMera knowing her mother Jennifer Horton (Melissa Reeves) does not approve. Mansi revealed that Stefano and Kate would also interfere in the romance forcing Chad and Abigail to "fight for their relationship," which makes them stronger. Deidrick said challenges were inevitable due to the relationship evolving so quickly. Mansi revealed in an interview that Chad "turns to her out of frustration from feeling the push and pull of wanting to be a part of the DiMera family but also not wanting to be a part of something that he feels is immoral." Deidrick explained that Chad can identify with Abigail because he also grew up with a father who neglected him which is why he and Jack don't really see eye to eye. Jack's disapproval of Chad's heritage also drives a wedge between Abigail and her father as she continues to defend Chad.

=== Romantic triangle and family troubles (2012) ===
The relationship is continuously strained and matters are only made worse by Chad's growing closeness with Melanie Jonas (Molly Burnett). Deidrick said that Chad and Melanie's kiss is accidental on the part of his character, but explains that "Melanie makes Chad feel good, kind of like a kid," as opposed to Abigail who is dealing with her chaotic family life.

Deidrick said that Chad is so "love struck" over Melanie that he doesn't even notice Gabi's feelings. On other hand, Melanie wants to maintain a friendship with Chad to keep him from hurting Abigail any further. Though the feelings were very "unexpected," Chad agrees to Melanie's wishes. When Deidrick started dating his costar Molly Burnett, the duo discussed the possibility of being paired together onscreen. Deidrick said that their real life romance helped with the portrayal of their "real" romance; "For Melanie and Chad, the backstory was already there." While it doesn't always work for other couples, Deidrick and Burnett immediately "clicked" in their onscreen romance. Burnett said Melanie brings out the funnier side of Chad. As a couple, Chad and Melanie are very "playful" and that is how they express their love for one another. However, most of Chad and Melanie's relationship is plagued by the schemes of Chad's former flame, Gabi Hernandez (Camila Banus) who obsesses over Chad. In an interview with TV Guide, Banus explained that Gabi who is on the rebound after breaking up with Will falls for Chad after he comes to her rescue; "she looks at [Chad] as her hero." Though they are forced to work so closely together during their modeling career, Chad is "oblivious" to Gabi's feelings. Deidrick explained that Chad only takes on the modeling gig to make Gabi's life easier due to her split with Will. However, when it comes to romance, Chad is focused on his budding romance with Melanie. Deidrick stated: "He cares about Gabi, but as far as he's concerned, things are going to stay completely platonic. Gabi has no idea about Melanie, so she thinks Chad's fair game." Though he won't admit it, Chad knows they have a chemistry during their photo shoots. The dynamic eventually develops into a triangle which leads to Gabi becoming "very manipulative" and a bit of a "psycho" in her quest for Chad's affections.

In the meantime, Chad feels pressured to embrace his family. Deidrick said that Chad "can't really turn away from family." When Stefano and Chad's brother, EJ DiMera (James Scott) have a falling out, and his sister Lexie Carver (Renée Jones) is on her death bed, Chad seems to be the only DiMera left standing. Meanwhile, Gabi's advances start to affect Chad and it looks as if he could reciprocate those feelings. Deidrick hinted that the triangle would turn "ugly." It is Lexie's passing and Stefano's presumed death that pushes Chad over the edge. For the first time, Deidrick allows for the character to cry. In an interview Soaps In Depth, Deidrick said that he used music to take Chad "into the darkness." The actor praised the writers for allowing him to flex his acting muscles by taking Chad to such unfamiliar territory.

=== Vendetta against Gabi (2012–2013) ===
In August 2012, Chad sees rescuing the kidnapped Melanie as his "last chance for a normal life" after the deaths of Lexie and Stefano. "Melanie has become his family," Deidrick said. He described Melanie and Chad's reunion as an "overpowering emotion for Chad." When he discovers that Gabi is behind Melanie's kidnapping, Chad is so shocked that "He doesn't really know what to do with the information." However, Chad rationalizes keeping Gabi's involvement from Melanie because he "doesn't want to make things worse," thinking she's been through enough. In the meantime Chad does everything to cut Gabi out of his life; "he pretty much exiles her," Deidrick said. Chad focuses all of his attention on Melanie and becomes extremely "protective." Chad feels the need to shelter Melanie. However it is Chad's lying that leads to their break. Though Chad seems overprotective, Deidrick said that Chad is overwhelmed after losing Lexie and Stefano and he reacts the way any normal person would. According to Deidrick, Chad reaches his boiling point and lashes out in anger. Chad sudden decision to ask Melanie to marry is his attempt to regain control of his life and his relationship. When she dumps him, Deidrick believed it is Chad's comeuppance for trying to control everything. It takes time for Chad to sort through his feelings. Deidrick explained that Chad has dealt with just about everything since his introduction and those experiences have hardened him. After losing Melanie, Chad immediately sets his sights on revenge. However, when Chad is at the end of his rope, he has no choice but to turn to his family, which allows for the writers to develop Chad's relationship with EJ. Deidrick relishes in Chad's attempt to destroy Gabi's budding romance with Nick Fallon (Blake Berris). But Chad is kind of left in limbo after Burnett's departure. Though he trusts the writers, Deidrick realized that Chad needed to make a change. And suddenly, it started, as Deidrick found ways to challenge himself by portraying Chad's "pain and vulnerability" with everyone he comes in contact with. Chad has yet to understand that, "You have to let things go," said Deidrick, a motto that he lives by in his personal life.

== Storylines ==
=== 2009–2013 ===
A 16-year-old Chad returns to Salem to reconnect with his ex-girlfriend, Mia McCormick (Taylor Spreitler) and clashes with her new boyfriend, Will Horton (Dylan Patton). To stay close to Mia, Chad takes a job at the local coffee shop, Java. In the meantime, he befriends Tad (Brendan Coughlin) and Kinsey (Shelby Young). Despite Kinsey's claims that Mia is fresh out of rehab, Chad sees through her lies and starts digging until he is confronted by Mia's supposed sponsor, Nicole DiMera (Arianne Zucker). In August 2009 Chad stops Mia from getting into a car wreck with Kinsey and admits he is in love with her. However, Chad is furious to learn that Mia gave their baby girl up for adoption. To distract Chad from the baby, Mia dumps Will and reunites with Chad; however sees their short lived reunion as an opportunity to dig for information on the baby. Chad threatens to sue for custody and Nicole tries to seduce him to get him to change his mind. Devastated by their daughter's death, Chad and Mia grow closer, only to break up in the New Year.

Chad briefly dates Gabi Hernandez (Gabriela Rodriguez) and Mia successfully breaks them up. However, thanks to Gabi, Will (now Chandler Massey) and Chad realize Mia is two-timing them, and dump her. In 2010, as Chad seeks an internship at DiMera Enterprises, he notices tension between Madeline and Will's grandmother, Kate Roberts (Lauren Koslow). Chad is shocked by Will's claim that Madeline and Kate once worked together as prostitutes. Chad immediately confronts Kate to get the truth. After Kate confirms the story, Chad confronts his mother. Their confrontation ends with Madeline falling down a flight of stairs. Chad is devastated when Madeline is declared dead but before he has the chance to grieve, DA Charles Woods starts to blame his son for Madeline's death. Despite Madeline's death being the result of a brain aneurysm, Chad can't help but believe Charles's words and blames himself.

Now estranged from his father, Chad learns that he is Stefano DiMera's son. Stefano welcomes Chad with open arms, but he initially rejects his new father. His sister Lexie Carver welcomes him with open arms and Chad even stands in as best man at his brother EJ DiMera's wedding with Nicole. Chad later strikes up a romance with Abigail Deveraux despite his new family's disapproval. Chad briefly moves into the mansion until he is shot in August 2011 and moves out for his own good. Chad then falls for Abigail's best friend Melanie Jonas after they share a kiss at the town's Halloween party. Meanwhile, Chad, Will and Sonny Kiriakis launch an internet website for sport fans at Salem University. However, they are forced to shut it down when criminals begin using it for illegal gambling. The criminals then kidnap Chad and Melanie and believing they are about to die, the two confess their feelings. Fortunately, they are rescued; however, Chad and Abigail break up. Abigail is initially upset about Chad and Melanie's romance, but she later gives them her blessing. Meanwhile, Chad and Gabi (Camila Banus) are forced to work together when they are both hired as models for Countess Wilhelmina. When Billie Reed (Lisa Rinna) mistakenly assumes they are dating, Gabi begins scheming to win Chad's affections. Melanie is uncomfortable with the attention Chad and Gabi are getting for their modeling campaign and their chemistry, but Chad assures her that he only has eyes for her. In the meantime, Gabi goes so far as to plant her earring in Chad's bed which interrupts Chad and Melanie's first attempt at making love. Gabi assures Melanie that her earring in Chad's bed was an accident and nothing more.

Chad is devastated when Lexie reveals she has cancer and Stefano is murdered. Chad is furious to learn that Will is a suspect and after Melanie tries to defend Will, they have a huge fight, and she presumably skips town. Chad mourns Lexie's passing all alone. It is revealed that Melanie had been kidnapped; the couple is reunited underground as the tunnels beneath Salem collapse. Chad attacks Melanie's captor, Andrew (Caleb Hunt) but he manages to escape before the collapse. Chad overhears Andrew's deathbed confession about Gabi's involvement in the kidnapping and confronts her. However, he agrees to keep the secret to protect Melanie and warns Gabi to stay away from Melanie. Chad also kicks Gabi out of his apartment and backs out of their modeling gig. Chad proposes to Melanie hoping to keep her safe from Nick Fallon. Chad attacks Nick when he mistakenly believes Nick hurt Melanie again. Unable to forgive Chad for his angry outburst, Melanie calls off the engagement and skips town. Chad briefly reunites with Abigail and exacts revenge on Gabi when he reveals at her wedding to Nick that Will is the father of her unborn child. Abigail dumps Chad forcing Lexie's brother, Cameron Davis (Nathan Owens) to come to her aid. Chad and Abigail eventually patch things up when they learn Cameron has been moonlighting as a stripper. She agrees to a date, but later backs out. Chad is touched when Will and Gabi name their baby Arianna Grace. Chad is mistakenly led to believe he has a brain tumor, and lies to Cameron about his diagnosis to keep him away from Abigail. Chad and Abigail consummate their relationship only for Chad to get shot at EJ and Sami Brady's engagement party. Though he survives, Abigail dumps him after she discovers his lie about the tumor. On October 30, 2013, Stefano accompanies Chad to Boston for a surgery to repair damage from the bullet.

=== 2014–present ===
In September 2014, Chad returns to Salem and upon seeing EJ, he punches him for sleeping with Abigail after finding out about their affair in Will's article. Chad reconnects with "T", Will (Guy Wilson), Sonny, and Abigail. He does not like the fact that Abigail is dating Ben Rogers (Robert Scott Wilson). He tries to get Ben fired from his club by accusing him of stealing but Sonny disagrees with Chad. Chad charms Abigail and soon becomes interested in Ben's sister Jordan Ridgeway (Chrishell Stause). Chad and Jordan begin dating, but they soon break up. Jordan soon after leaves Salem after receiving a new job opportunity. After Jordan leaves Salem, Chad goes back to pursuing Abigail, but, his life got changed when he discover his half-brother EJ and adoptive sister Kristen were killed, and know now that he was the last child in the family. In June 2015, Abigail cheats on Ben and sleeps with Chad. Chad tells Abigail that he was just using her to get revenge on what happened with EJ, but the truth is he is still in love with her and wants to protect her from his father. Abigail becomes pregnant and the father is revealed to be Ben after Ben's father Clyde Weston (James Read) threatens the doctors facilitating the paternity test. Chad is disowned by Stefano and, depressed, goes to a bar where he meets Serena Mason (Melissa Archer). Serena rejects his advances and Chad drunkenly goes after her, waking up the next morning without any memory of anything that happened after he left the bar and soon finds out he's the prime suspect after Serena is found strangled by the "Necktie Killer" in the park. After the murder of Paige Larson and when Dr. Marlena Evans is attacked when she's unable to help Chad remember what happened the nights Serena and Paige were murdered, he is taken into custody and continues to be convicted of murder after Will is killed. He is released after Aiden Jennings (Daniel Cosgrove) attacks Hope Brady (Kristian Alfonso) on their wedding night and he is believed to be the "Necktie Killer." Chad goes to Abigail and Ben's apartment to thank Abigail for believing in him, but Ben (who is the real killer) makes him leave threatening to call the cops. Abigail, who Ben is keeping hostage in a cabin in the middle of nowhere, is forced to call Chad and tell her that she's over with him, but while on the phone, is able to communicate with Chad that she's in trouble without Ben knowing. Chad arrives at the cabin, but Ben knocks him out and ties him and Abigail to the bed, setting it on fire and leaving with Abigail's premature son. Chad is eventually able to get himself and Abigail free and he carries her to safety. They are found by the police and Chad and Abigail return to Salem. Stricken over the disappearance of her son, Chad and Abigail's brother JJ Deveraux (Casey Moss) go back to Mammoth Falls, where Abigail was being held hostage and find her son at a motel and then reunite them at the hospital in Salem. She renames her son Thomas Jack Deveraux. Afterwards, Chad and Abigail start to plan a future together. Chad is later hypnotized by Marlena but is brainwashed by Andre, after he hijacks the session, to do the family bidding and get close to Belle after Sami stole the DiMera fortune. He is also forced to break up with Abigail. After Thomas gets sick it is revealed that Chad is his father, not Ben.

Chad was later shocked that his father has been murdered.

== Reception ==
=== Critical ===
TV Source Magazine labeled Deidrick a fan favorite and described the character of Chad as "one of the soaps’ most popular younger characters of the late ’00s." Stephanie Sloane of Soap Opera Digest commented that Chad's paternity seemed to envelope the series, but applauded the writers for "wisely" connecting him to the DiMera clan. Sloane also disagreed with how long the story took to play out. She praised Deidrick for Chad's very brief interactions with his future family members, Stefano, Kate and EJ. Nelson Branco of TV Guide Canada refers to Deidrick's performance in May 2011 as "infectious." In June 2011, Deidrick ranked at #3 along with costar, Chandler Massey in the "Top Young Actors to Watch" category. In 2012, Deidrick earned an Emmy pre-nomination in the Outstanding Younger Actor category for his portrayal of Chad. Michael Fairman applauded Deidrick for his portrayal of Chad in January 2013 when the character took revenge on Gabi and Nick, by revealing that Nick is not the father of her baby. The ratings also spiked for the episode, giving the series its highest ratings in two years.

Omar Nobles praised Deidrick's portrayal and stated: "Deidrick’s enduring charm and emotional performances helped turn the tide in favor of the one-time bad boy" which would lead to his popularity. Upon the announcement of Deidrick's departure, Michael Fairman described the actor as "one of the best young actors on daytime." Jamey Giddens said "As much as I'm going to miss the tall, drink of DiMera, I can't say I blame Deidrick." Giddens attributed the decision to Chad's dramatic decline in screen time following Burnett's departure. Though sad about Deidrick's departure, Nobles said the actor had a great "future ahead of him." Fairman praised Deidrick for his portrayal of Chad's final scenes which aired on October 30, 2013.

=== Relationships ===
Prior to the announcement about the gay storyline, fans and critics alike pushed for a romantic pairing between Chad and Will due to the chemistry between the actors. Errol Lewis of Soap Opera Network explained that the two would have great potential as a romantic pairing, due to their heritage alone; with Chad being a DiMera, and Will being a Brady, would solidify the pairing as "star-crossed lovers" because of the long-standing feud between their families being staple within the series for so long. Despite both characters being involved in romantic pairings with females at the time, the pairing had already established a large fan base. The two, however, remain friends even when Will does turn out to be gay. The pairing is referred to by fans by their portmanteau "Chill." Despite the joke between costars, fans immediately began pushing for the pairing. Deidrick said he would be open to the potential pairing if the writers were to go in that direction. In June 2011, the duo ranked at #2 in the "Top Dream Couples" category on TV Guide Canada's "Soapgeist". Critics praised the writers for maintaining Chad and Will's friendship, and developing his friendship with Sonny despite both characters being gay. However, fans also pushed for a Sonny/Chad pairing after Chad defends him to a gay bully in September 2011. In response Smith jokingly shot down the idea and said that Chad is a little too tall for Sonny. Greg Hernandez said it was Chad's friendship with Will and Sonny that endeared him to the character. Fans also spoke out when Chad's friendship with Will and Sonny started taking a back seat to other storylines.

The onscreen pairing of Chad and Abigail became very popular among fans and garnered the squish name, "Chabby". Jamey Giddens enjoyed Abigail and Chad's new dynamic displayed in their snooping around Cameron. Giddens said that while he wasn't a fan of their initial romance, "Abby and Chad’s scenes were fun, and made me wish I could see more."
