= Susan Banks =

Fictional character from Days of Our Lives

- Days of Our Lives character
- Eileen Davidson as Susan Banks
- Portrayed by: Eileen Davidson (1996–1998, 2014–2017, 2021); Brynn Thayer (2011); Stacy Haiduk (2018–present)
- Duration: 1996–1998; 2011; 2014; 2017–2019; 2021–present
- First appearance: November 4, 1996
- Created by: James E. Reilly
- Introduced by: Ken Corday and Tom Langan (1996); Ken Corday, Lisa de Cazotte and Greg Meng (2014); Ken Corday, Albert Alarr and Greg Meng (2017); Ken Corday and Albert Alarr (2021)
In-universe information
- Other names: Susan Delilah Banks; Kristen Blake/Kristen DiMera; Susan Crumb; Susie
- Brothers: Thomas Banks
- Sisters: Sister Mary Moira Banks; Penelope Kent
- Husband: John Black (1997); Edmund Crumb (1998–?); Roger Fisher (?–present)
- Sons: EJ DiMera
- Grandchildren: Johnny DiMera; Sydney DiMera; Trey DiMera (adopted/great); Oliva DiMera (great)

Susan Banks is a fictional character on NBC's daytime drama Days of Our Lives. She was played by Eileen Davidson from November 4, 1996, to April 8, 1998, and again in 2014 and 2017. Susan is the eccentric mother of Elvis "EJ" DiMera, and once acted as Kristen Blake's doppelganger. In November 2011, it was announced that Brynn Thayer would take over the role of Susan, since Davidson was committed to The Young and the Restless. Thayer made her brief one-off appearance as Susan on December 7, 2011.

In January 2014, it was announced that Davidson would be returning to Days for a three-month story arc after having departed with the show in November 2013. In late September 2014, it was announced that Davidson would reprise her role as Susan Banks; her first time portraying the character in 16 years. Davidson returned to the role once again on November 2, 2017. She reprised the role of Susan's sister, Sister Mary Moira, on November 21, 2017.

Stacy Haiduk debuted as Susan on August 21, 2018, and departed on November 8, 2018, and appeared for a short stint the following year, last appearing in August 2019. Haiduk later reprised the role, beginning on February 4, 2021.

== Casting ==
The decision to create a storyline in which Stefano hires a doppelganger to impersonate Kristen Blake demanded that the Days producers cast an actress who resembled Davidson. Brenda Epperson was considered for the role, an actress Davidson suggested to replace her in her role as Ashley Abbott on The Young and the Restless due to their uncanny resemblance. Instead of casting Epperson, or any actress for that matter, Davidson asked that she play both roles: Kristen and her alter. The show ultimately agreed. Davidson stated in 2019 that she had asked to play Susan as she wanted the "challenge".

On rehearsing, Davidson related: “I had a tape recorder and I would read the scene and turn it off when the character I was supposed to be talked. I ran lines that way. The major way that I knew it was working was because the crew was laughing, and I was laughing, we were cracking up all the time.”

The sixteen-hour work days (including Saturdays) Davidson spent on the Days set led to her developing digestive problems and insomnia. "They worked me to death. I was at the end of my contract, I was going to leave after the first year I played Susan. And they asked me to stay an additional year to finish off the storyline, so I did."

The gruel from playing upwards of five characters led to Davidson's departure from the show. Post-Days, head writer James E. Reilly called Davidson personally to apologize for working her ‘into the ground.’ He told her that he couldn't help it; he felt inspired by her. “That’s OK. You know I volunteered to play both characters!” Davidson responded.

In 2011, Days was unable to obtain Davidson, who was working on The Young and the Restless at the time, to reprise the role of Susan. A recast was made with actress Brynn Thayer filling in. Thayer was asked to research the character by watching old clips of Davidson as Susan on YouTube. The show decided to show only the back of Thayer's head as Susan, who takes a phone call from Salem. Thayer made her brief one-off appearance as Susan on December 7, 2011.

Per Davidson's agreement in 2012 to return to the soap, a stipulation was included in her contract: Lisa Williams, who acted as her double in Davidson's original Days stint, would be re-hired if need be. Davidson returned to the soap under the assumption that she would be portraying Susan Banks, with just a little bit of Kristen. Ultimately, Banks did not appear until 2014. However, in September 2013, a tribute of sorts was made to the late James E. Reilly when Kristen, who needs to go undercover, uses Susan's teeth as a disguise. Davidson had taken Susan's teeth with her before leaving the soap in 1998.

Prior to her 2014 return, Davidson was alerted that her storyline would include Susan Banks. "They told me, but they also knew that I was up for it." Lisa Williams returned as Davidson's double. Davidson reprised her role in November 2017.

In 2017, head writer Ron Carlivati discussed the decision behind having Susan Banks being responsible for Will Horton's disappearance and resurrection, stating: "When we went to explore who might have a motivation to initiate Will's disappearance or Will's death, Susan came to mind, and we came up with a story that would require [Eileen Davidson] involved." Carlivati admitted his reluctance to this decision, due to Davidson's commitment to The Young and the Restless, even considering a recast for the role, however, deemed that "trickier". Davidson announced that her scenes became a collaborative effort as Carlivati was unfamiliar with Susan and was relying on others to fill him in – "But who better than, you know, the person that played her? [...] [Ron] was very open to hearing my input, and when I thought that it was maybe too broad, he would let me change it or cut it or whatever I needed to do. It’s easy to write Susan broad, and it's easy to play her broad. So it's always, like, trying to pull it back, but also showing the flavor of her personality."

On August 17, 2018, it was announced that Stacy Haiduk had been cast as Susan and Kristen; she made her first appearance as Susan on August 21, 2018.

== Development ==
While James E. Reilly created the character, Davidson was the driving force behind the character's personality. “Susan was supposed to be insecure from a small town, not very worldly, basically kind of ignorant. She had an innocence. I based a lot of it on innocence, not necessarily ignorance. But she was very intelligent in a certain way. She was good at getting what she wanted.” Davidson would have a lot of input into all of the characters she portrayed, including wardrobe and hairstyles. Reilly added Susan's obsession with Elvis Presley.

On Susan's voice, Davidson states: "For the voice, I just went up a couple of octaves and threw in a Southern accent. It was easy." Besides the characters Kristen and Susan Banks, Davidson would go on to play an assortment of Susan's family members: Sister Mary Moira (a nun), Thomas Banks, and Penelope Kent.

== Storylines ==
=== 1996–1998 ===
In August 1996, Kristen is hospitalized after an explosion kills her mother and she miscarries her child. Stefano soon reappears in Salem and hires Kristen's lookalike Susan Banks to carry a child that Kristen would raise as her and John's. With the help of her father and Peter, Kristen fakes her pregnancy. When Susan goes into labor, Kristen disguised as a nurse is forced to watch as John marries Susan, believing she is really Kristen. Kristen gets custody of the child long enough to name him John Black, Jr. and Susan soon returns to claim her child and husband. Kristen enlists Vivian Alamain (Louise Sorel) and Ivan in keeping Susan locked in a secret room but Marlena puts the pieces together and Kristen is forced to lock her away. When Susan discovers the truth, sick of Kristen's manipulations she locks Kristen inside the room and attempts to marry John until Laura Horton (Jamie Lyn Bauer) confronts her at the wedding. After being rejected by John due to her scheming, Kristen's failed attempt to kill Marlena lands her in jail. After being released on bail, she attempts suicide after hearing about John and Marlena's engagement. She then reveals Marlena's presumed dead husband, Roman Brady (now Josh Taylor); John and Kristen then pretend to marry to keep Roman from becoming suspicious. When John and Stefano ruin her attempt to get back Susan's son, Elvis (a.k.a. John, Jr.), she reveals that Roman and Marlena have been seeing one another.

Kristen's attempt to force Susan into giving the child back ends with the death of Susan's identical sister, Penelope Kent. Fearing she'll be charged with murder, Kristen pretends to be Susan and is forced to marry Susan's boyfriend, Edmund Crumb (Adam Caine). In the meantime, "Susan" and Edmund go on a honeymoon and Laura is arrested for Kristen's murder. Edmund admits to Kristen's "murder" and they soon run into the real Susan who explains that Kristen sold her into a harem; it is then revealed that the dead person was Susan's other sibling, Penelope Kent. To get revenge against Kristen, Susan exchanges her freedom for Kristen to be sold to the harem.

=== 2011, 2014 ===
In December 2011, Bo (Peter Reckell) and Hope (Kristian Alfonso) come across an ornament owned by Alice Horton. Tucked inside it they find a letter written by Susan asking Alice for help with Elvis who was sick and needed a doctor. The letter is to be extended to Stefano. Bo finds Susan's phone number in the United Kingdom and Hope decides to call her. Hope inquires as to the significance of the letter to Susan (Brynn Thayer) who becomes nervous that Elvis is in trouble. Susan inadvertently reveals that Alice helped Elvis, and Stefano visited her after Elvis was better. Realizing that she's said too much, Susan pretends that the phone line has a bad connection and hangs up.

In 2014, Susan (Davidson) turns up on the DiMera Mansion doorstep, having come to visit EJ, as she has had a premonition that he's in grave danger. She attempts to convince him to return to the United Kingdom with her. Susan also doesn't think that Sami (Alison Sweeney) is the right woman for him to be with; she sees her as nothing but trouble. She reveals why she allowed Stefano, who she says is evil, to raise him: she and Edmund couldn't provide the life that he could. Susan refers to EJ as her "first born," suggesting that she's had more children after him. Susan is left alone in the mansion and decides to pay John a visit in the hospital. She goes to open the door to leave and is greeted by Kristen, who is standing there. The two trade barbs; Susan rushes out after Kristen gets Stefano on the phone. Susan visits an unconscious John in the hospital. She talks about their almost wedding and before going, leaves a photo from the nuptials. EJ later is shot and presumed to have died.

=== 2017–2019 ===
The hunt for Will Horton (Chandler Massey) leads Sami, John and Marlena to a house in Memphis occupied by Roger (John Enos III), an Elvis impersonator, and Susan. While toting a rifle and standing in a bedroom whose walls are adorned with the initials "EJ", Susan reveals that she paid Dr. Wilhelm Rolf to revive Will as part of a revenge plot against Sami. Susan holds Sami responsible for EJ's death; it's caused her to spiral out of control as well as ended her marriage to Edmund. Susan is adamant that Rolf's revival didn't work. However, Will, identifying himself as EJ, is found alive and working in a bar in Memphis. Friends and family try desperately to convince him that he's been brainwashed by his "mother" Susan and to return to Salem. When Roger confirms that Susan isn't Will's biological mother, Susan suffers a mental breakdown and is hospitalized. Will decides to return to Salem to learn about his former life. Will keeps tabs on Susan's progress through Roger, learning that she's been institutionalized and that on New Year's Eve she's suffered a relapse after receiving a visitor in her hospital room.

Months later, a recovered Susan (Stacy Haiduk) arrives back in Salem on Will's doorstep to make amends. She also turns up at Marlena's bachelorette party and manages to invite herself to Marlena and John Black's upcoming wedding. Susan mentions to Marlena that she was visited by Kristen, who is very much alive, in the hospital. Marlena convinces Susan that Kristen is dead and that she was probably just hallucinating from the drugs that the hospital had administered. Kristen (Haiduk) catches Susan alone and forces her at knife-point to switch places with her so she can attend the wedding undetected. After the wedding, Susan stays with Victor (John Aniston) and Maggie (Suzanne Rogers). She is determined to give the doll she made (an exact replica of Marlena) as a wedding gift to Marlena once she's recovered in the hospital. Susan reveals that she used her own hair for the doll. Susan has a premonition that EJ is still alive. Sami tracks down a patient in a secret facility Kristen has been running with Dr. Rolf in Nashville and rescues him, but not before he's severely burned. Sami uses the hair on Susan's Marlena doll as a DNA sample to find out if the man she rescued in the facility is really EJ without telling Susan. In an effort to get her out of his house, Victor tells Susan that Sami has her son. Susan discovers a bandaged man in the hospital along with the DNA test results confirming that he is indeed her son. She confronts Sami wielding a scalpel. Sami convinces Susan to agree to allow her to take EJ to Italy to a renowned clinic for burn victims, and tells Susan that she can visit.

In 2019, after being double-crossed by Xander Kiriakis (Paul Telfer), Kristen, who has returned to Salem as Nicole Walker (Arianne Zucker), decides to disguise herself, once again, as Susan. Unbeknownst to Kristen, the real Susan is back in town. Susan later bumps into Kristen, still in her disguise, and pulls a gun on her. Kristen manages to convince her that she is her sister, Sister Mary Moira. Susan is later tied up by Kristen disguised as Nicole at John and Marlena's wedding anniversary party. After Kristen is unmasked in front of a roomful of guests, Susan, who's managed to untie herself, rescues Marlena from Kristen, who is holding her at gunpoint, by hitting her on the head.

=== 2021–present ===
Susan returns to Salem in February 2021 to warn Marlena about a premonition she has in which Brady Black is shot. She later helps Ben Weston discover that Ciara Brady, his wife, is alive and held captive through her abilities. Kristen, who is now in prison, convinces Susan to switch places once more on the promise that it will only be for a month. She remained in prison as "Kristen" while, Kristen (as "Susan") keeps an eye on Brady and tries to keep Chloe Lane away from him. Kristen also has Vivian Alamain, who is in prison as well, keep an eye on Susan so to keep the secret of Kristen's escape. However, Brady visits "Kristen" once more and discovers the truth. After Kristen is arrested, Susan is released. Susan confronts Kristen in the station alone and is knocked unconscious. Kristen takes her clothes and escapes while Susan is attended to by Ava Vitali and Rafe Hernandez.

She continued to visit Salem from time to time where she was instrumental in helping to realize The Devil had returned to Salem to take Ben and Ciara's baby as its new host. In November 2022, she was kidnapped by Xander Cook under Ava Vitali's orders to blackmail EJ for money after he tried blackmail her to leave Salem. She was able to reach Xander's conscience and he let her go. But when she went to Ava and EJ's meeting site, Ava held her at gunpoint and they drove off with EJ in pursuit. Realizing there was no way out, Ava drove the car off the road and it exploded.

Susan is discovered alive in London chained up in ex-husband Edmund Crumb's flat. After she's rescued, Susan helps clear Ava of murder charges. It's revealed that unbeknownst to her, Clyde Weston had some men take her from the crash site and sent to Edmund, who was told not to tell anyone of her whereabouts. Susan ultimately decides to return to Memphis to see Roger.

== Reception ==
Davidson's performance earned her her first Daytime Emmy Award nomination in the category of Outstanding Lead Actress in a Drama Series in 1998.
