= EJ DiMera =

- Days of Our Lives character
- Dan Feuerriegel as EJ DiMera
- Portrayed by: Avalon, Dillon & Vincent Ragone (1997–1998); James Scott (2006–2014); Trey Baxter (2018); Dan Feuerriegel (2021–present)
- Duration: 1997–1998; 2006–2014; 2018; 2021–present
- First appearance: February 21, 1997
- Created by: James E. Reilly and Kola Boof
- Introduced by: Ken Corday and Tom Langan (1997); Ken Corday and Stephen Wyman (2006); Ken Corday, Albert Alarr and Greg Meng (2018); Ken Corday and Albert Alarr (2021)
- Spin-off appearances: Days of Our Lives: A Very Salem Christmas (2021)
In-universe information
- Other names: John Black Jr.; Elvis John Banks; Elvis Aaron Banks; Elvis Aaron DiMera; EJ Wells
- Occupation: Race car driver Lawyer; Mobster; Businessman; Politician; District Attorney
- Family: DiMera
- Father: Stefano DiMera
- Mother: Susan Banks
- Half-brothers: André DiMera; Tony DiMera (legal); Peter Blake (adoptive); Benjy Hawk; Stefan DiMera; Jake Lambert; Chad DiMera
- Half-sisters: Kristen DiMera (adoptive); Renée DuMonde; Megan DiMera; Lexie Carver
- Wife: Sami Brady (2007–2008, 2014–2022); Nicole Walker (2009–2010, 2011–2012, 2023–2024)
- Sons: Johnny DiMera; Daniel DiMera
- Daughters: Sydney DiMera
- Stepsons: Jude Roman Brady
- Stepdaughters: Holly Jonas
- Grandsons: Trey DiMera (adoptive)
- Granddaughters: Olivia DiMera
- Grandfathers: Santo DiMera
- Uncles: Ryan Brady; Thomas Banks
- Aunts: Sister Mary Banks; Penelope Kent
- Nephews: Dimitri Von Leuschner; Theo Carver; Steven Hawk; Thomas DiMera
- Nieces: Grace Brady; Charlotte DiMera; Rachel Black (adoptive)

EJ DiMera is a fictional character from Days of Our Lives, an American soap opera on the NBC network. Created by head writer James E. Reilly and introduced under executive producers, Ken Corday and Tom Langan, EJ is the son of crime boss Stefano DiMera (Joseph Mascolo) and the eccentric Susan Banks (Eileen Davidson). Initially portrayed by child actors Avalon, Dillon, and Vincent Ragone from February 1997 to April 1998, the character was rapidly aged in 2006 when James Scott was cast in the role; he departed the role in October 2014. In 2018, the role was briefly portrayed by Trey Baxter. In June 2021, Australian actor Dan Feuerriegel assumed the role.

Upon the character's 2006 re-introduction, EJ is immediately taken with Sami Brady (Alison Sweeney), with the pairing becoming one of the most popular and controversial couples in recent history, with the controversy stemming from EJ raping Sami in exchange for his help in saving the life of her longtime love, Lucas Horton. This rape also produces their son, Johnny. The couple's first marriage is for convenience, allowing EJ to stay in the country when he begins having problems with immigration. EJ also has a chaotic relationship with Sami's nemesis, Nicole Walker. EJ and Sami's relationship is also rivaled by Sami's relationship with Rafe Hernandez. EJ reunites with Sami but presumably dies after being shot by his disloyal bodyguard hired by rival Clyde Weston. However, Kristen revealed in 2017 that EJ was alive, and Susan and Sami were reunited with him the following year. EJ then returned to Salem in June 2021.

Scott's performance in the role garnered him two consecutive Daytime Emmy Award nominations for Outstanding Lead Actor in a Drama Series in 2010 and 2011.

== Creation ==
=== Background ===
According to former Days writer Kola Boof, she also helped create the role of EJ Wells and decided to cast Scott in the role. Boof titled her initial character bible for EJ Wells as "The Devil Finds Work." Boof revealed to Nelson Branco of TV Guide that EJ initially comes to town to avenge his mother, Susan (Eileen Davidson), who by that time had been in a mental institution. Eileen Davidson was set to reprise the role for a few episodes slated to air in the fall. However, the planned story was abandoned when Boof was fired from the writing team. The character was always meant to be a race car driver, but following Boof's firing, his racer career was also forgotten, and he was written as a lawyer.

The majority of EJ's childhood is spent with a nanny whom he refers to as his governess, whom he compares to Mary Poppins. EJ begins attending boarding schools at a very young age. EJ is a fan of Jazz music. EJ attends Eton College along with Duke of Cambridge, Prince William (revising his birth year to 1982) and even serviced his car at one point. EJ later attends Oxford University. During this time, EJ is in a long-term romance with another woman, and they graduate from Oxford together. However, she wants to pursue a career while EJ is allowed to compete in the European racing circuit. He asks her to come with him, but she refuses, and they go their separate ways. EJ then dedicates himself to racing and becomes known worldwide for his skill. After college, EJ works in Cairo doing import and export work and also lives in India for a while. EJ also has experience as a bartender. He spends a lot of time in Monte Carlo as a race car driver.

=== Casting ===
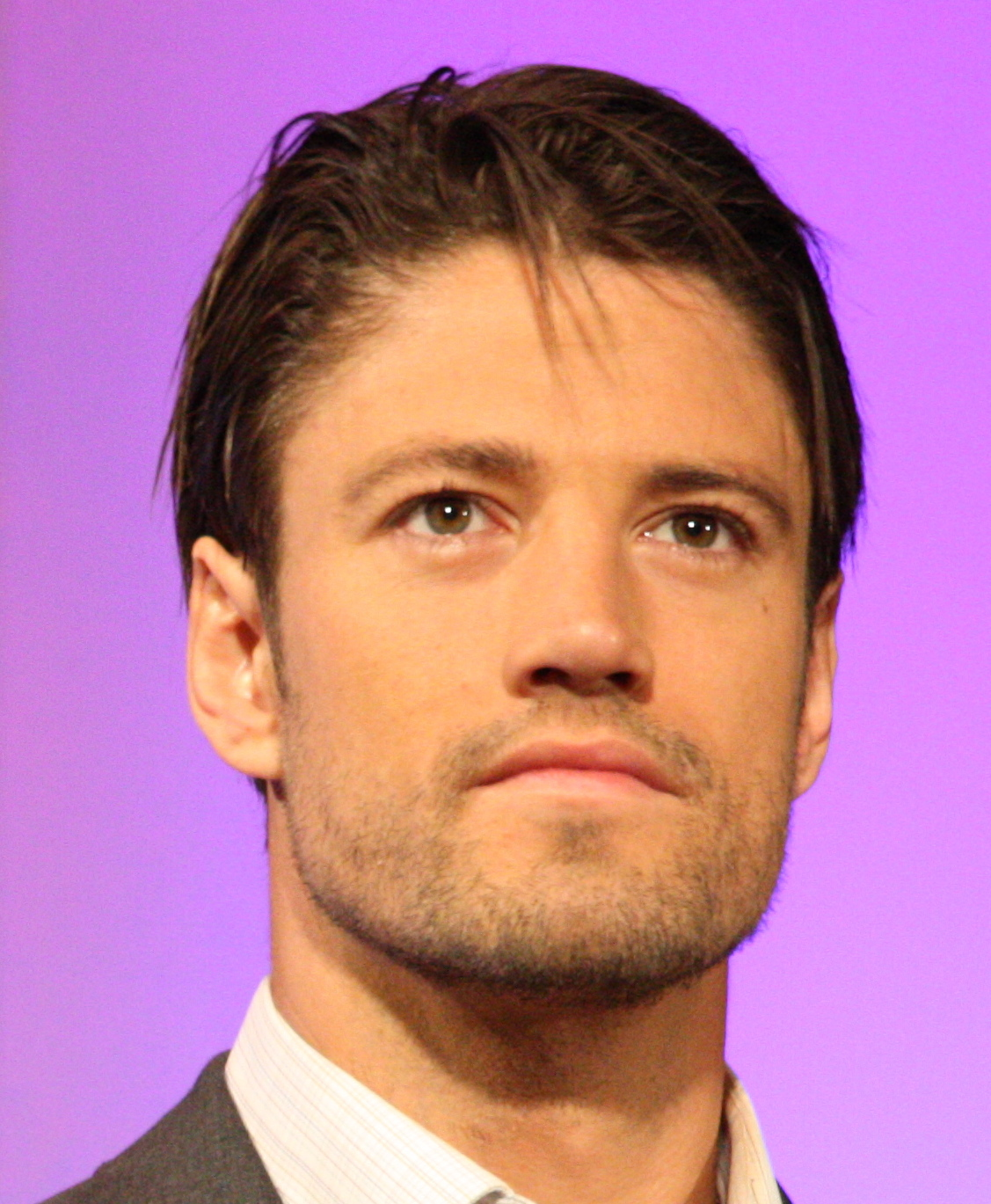
James Scott joined the cast as an aged EJ in 2006; he departed the role in 2014.

In May 2006, it was announced that Scott, previously known for his controversial role as Ethan Cambias on All My Children was slated to join the cast of Days in the role of E.J. The character's surname remained secret to keep his connections to other characters on canvas a secret. Scott filmed his first scenes on May 3 and debuted on May 30, 2006. Kola Boof revealed that Justin Hartley, formerly of Passions was also considered for the role. After Scott's character was killed off of All My Children, Scott stayed in New York City until the end of the pilot season when he was contacted by the casting department from Days. They told Scott that he would fit in the role of EJ. However, Scott was still under contract with ABC at the time. Scott asked to be released from his contract, and the network agreed. In February 2009, Scott revealed that he re-signed with the series for another two years. In December 2010, Scott revealed that he was considering branching out into other mediums and hinted at the possibility of retiring from acting. In late September 2011, Soap Opera Digest revealed that James would depart the series when his contract expired. However, negotiations continued shortly after the news broke about Scott's potential departure. James issued the following statement: "It has always been my wish to continue working with Days of our Lives, and in light of recent reassurances given, I am optimistic of my future here at Days." Deanna Barnert speculated that the recent reboot of the series, which included bringing back several popular veteran characters was in preparation of Scott's potential departure. On October 5, it was confirmed that Scott had re-signed with the series for another year, with his contract set to expire in April 2013. Scott later extended his stay for another year. On May 2, 2014, Soap Opera Digest confirmed that Scott had wrapped filming and would exit the series screen sometime in the fall. In a May 2020 interview with Soap Opera Digest, Paul Telfer revealed he had previously been hired as a one-week stand-by, due to an undisclosed health issue by James. Telfer later joined the cast as Xander Kiriakis in 2015.

On March 31, 2021, Daytime Confidential reported that Australian actor Dan Feuerriegel had been cast in the role. Two months later, Deadline Hollywood announced Feuerriegel's casting; he made his first episodic appearance during the final moments of the June 9, 2021, episode.

=== Characterization ===
Before his debut, Scott revealed some similarities between his new character and his former alter ego, Ethan Cambias. The only thing Scott was told about his character was that he was a race car driver. Though it does not entirely define the character, it does affect who EJ is. EJ is not easily affected by everyday life because he is used to operating in high-pressure situations, such as racing. Whenever his life is in danger and he is forced to make a decision, it puts EJ at "ease." Scott was allowed to use his natural British accent in his portrayal of EJ. In 2008, BuddyTV referred to the character as a "dashing" anti-hero because he is a "good guy" and a "bad guy" all in one. EJ, like any other person, has a dark side to him. In 2011, Deanna Barnert described the character as "nefarious."

== Storylines ==
=== 1997–1998 ===
Elvis John Banks was born to Stefano DiMera and Susan Banks (Eileen Davidson) on February 21, 1997. At the time, Susan, a Kristen Blake (also Davidson) look alike, was paid to give birth to a baby that would then be adopted by Kristen, unbeknownst to John Black, Kristen's fiancée. Susan realizes Kristen is deceptive and cruel, while John is loving and noble. As the birth mother of the child that Kristen and John claimed as theirs, Susan planned to take Kristen's place at John's side and in his bed. Marlena Evans, however, managed to foil the plans of both Kristen and Susan; Marlena and John reunited, and Susan was content to find love with Edmund Crumb then. Salemites believed that EJ was then raised by Susan and Edmund, who moved to the United Kingdom. Stefano, however, managed to snatch EJ from Susan, raising him at Maison Blanche in New Orleans and sending him to British boarding schools.

=== 2006–2014 ===
EJ Wells first appears as Sami Brady’s handsome new neighbor across the hall. The growing chemistry between him and Samantha stopped abruptly as EJ was soon revealed to be the mysterious figure attacking Sami's family and his connection to Stefano was also discovered. In December 2006, EJ held Sami at gunpoint and forced her to help him through the police roadblocks set up by Salem PD to keep him from leaving the country after he shot John Black. After Sami got him through the roadblocks, EJ told her to leave the car. Sami refused and said that since she had helped him, he must have helped her save Lucas Horton's life. EJ agrees to help her only if she has sex with him in exchange for saving Lucas; EJ then rapes Sami. Afterward, he helped Sami get a beam off, leaving them to die in the snow with no way out. EJ brainwashed Steve Johnson and forced him to kidnap a comatose John Black and transplant one of his kidneys into a dying Stefano. When Sami learned she was pregnant, Celeste Perrault revealed that EJ was the child's father but warned him that Stefano would disapprove. His brother, Tony DiMera, convinced him to kidnap Sami and harvest the stem cells from the unborn child to save Stefano's life. EJ changed his mind and helped Sami escape at the last minute. Sami later learned she was carrying twins, and Stefano ordered them to marry so they could end the feud between the Brady and DiMera families once and for all. Sami welcomed her twins in October 2007. It turned out that Lucas fathered the little girl, Allie, and EJ fathered the little boy, Johnny. After John was killed in a hit-and-run accident, Sami married EJ in November 2007, blackmailed by Stefano and EJ and against her will, but he was shot at the altar by Lucas (it was later that we found that Will, Lucas' son, was the one that shot EJ.) EJ promised to change and become an excellent example for the twins. At the same time, Lucas was arrested for EJ's shooting. Later, Sami's mother, Marlena Evans, gave him a chance to redeem himself by bringing down his father. EJ knew that a brainwashed John Black was in the basement of the DiMera mansion and decided to reunite him with his family in January 2008. EJ and Sami moved into a safe house to stay safe from Stefano, where they bonded over raising the twins. They planned to have the marriage annulled, but the death of Sami's grandpa, Shawn, forced them to put it off. When they finally got another chance, EJ put it off by pretending that his visa had expired, and Sami agreed to prolong the marriage until he could deal with immigration. EJ began representing Nicole Walker during her divorce from Victor Kiriakis. Meanwhile, EJ and Sami had sex for the first time in May 2008, just in time for Lucas to be released from prison and catch them in bed. Sami discovered EJ's ploy to stay married to her by bribing the immigration agent, and their annulment was finalized soon after.

In July 2008, EJ and Nicole got trapped in an elevator together and ended up having sex. Nicole learned she was pregnant but hid it when she had a miscarriage. Nicole also knew Sami was pregnant by EJ and planned to keep it from him. Nicole faked her pregnancy and took teenage Mia McCormick's child for her and EJ to raise. However, she later switched Mia's baby with Sami's baby: she and EJ named EJ's and Sami's daughter, Sydney Anne. When Sami returned home from the Witness Protection Program, she claimed to have adopted baby Grace. EJ and Nicole married in April 2009. Tony DIMera, EJ's brother, would die after getting into a fight with Philip Kiriakis. EJ blamed Philip for Tony's death and wanted revenge; this would lead to a war with Philip Kiriakis and his father, Victor. A feud between DIMeras and Kiriakis started, but they called a truce in the end.

EJ was devastated after Grace died in June 2009, and Sami told him that he was the child's father. EJ became furious with Sami for keeping EJ from his child. EJ felt hurt and betrayed by Sami for lying to him. EJ was heartbroken and grieved over the loss of his daughter. For months, EJ would be angry with Sami while being in pain over losing Grace and never knowing his daughter. Despite being furious, EJ was still in love with Sami and hurt over the fact that she lied and kept from his daughter, didn't trust him, and tried to pass Rafe Hernandez off as the father. However, EJ later would start suspecting Nicole was keeping something from him. EJ sent someone to spy on Nicole to get information. EJ learned that Nicole had a miscarriage, and he kicked her and Sydney out of the mansion. But EJ didn't know Sydney was his natural daughter, not Grace. EJ personally would change over the years: he would grow more and more angry, more ruthless, more aggressive, colder, and more calculating as time went by. EJ saved Rafe Hernandez's life after one of Stefano's men tried to kill Rafe, but EJ put a stop to it. Rafe later revealed that Nicole switched the babies and Sydney was EJ and Sami's child. EJ and Sami reunited with Sydney; EJ and Sami would call a truce. EJ later realized that Stefano had assisted Nicole with her schemes. EJ took all his anger and rage out on Stefano by choking him; EJ severed ties with Stefano again.

In December 2009, Nicole attempted to kidnap Sydney and skip town. This brought EJ and Sami closer as they shared a moment over Sydney. EJ, Sami, and Rafe worked together to get Sydney back. Still, someone else stole Sydney from Nicole. EJ and Sami united to try to find Sydney, but EJ overheard Sami saying that she wished EJ wasn't in the picture, that Rafe was Sydney's father and that she and Rafe could raise Sydney together. After hearing this, EJ became furious with Sami.

It was revealed that EJ had kidnapped Sydney and faked her death as revenge on Sami for keeping the child a secret and breaking up her and Rafe. His sister-in-law, Anna DiMera, was his accomplice. EJ was seen as the "hero" when he suddenly brought Sydney back home, and he and Sami became close again. EJ realized later that he was still in love with Sami and felt guilty over what he had done. EJ and Sami become closer, and EJ confesses his love for Sami and later asks her to marry him, which she eventually accepts.

In August 2010, as they prepare to marry, Rafe reveals EJ's schemes, and Sami walks out on him. Sami shoots a drunken EJ in the head and leaves him for dead. EJ wakes up from a coma believing he and Sami got married, but the truth is that she is now married to Rafe. Rafe's sister, Arianna, found proof that Sami shot EJ, but she was killed in an accident before she could get it to him. However, EJ received Arianna's proof from Nicole. EJ blackmails Sami to give him full custody of Johnny and Sydney. EJ asked Nicole to marry him so he could get back at Sami by making Nicole the children's stepmother. When it was learned Johnny had eye cancer, EJ and Sami put their problems behind them. EJ made a deal with God to let Johnny keep his eyes, and he would let Sami be part of Johnny's and Sydney's lives. Stefano also revealed to EJ and his sister, Lexie Carver, that they have another brother, Chad Woods, the biological father of baby Grace.

EJ and Nicole married in February 2011. EJ schemes to take Rafe out of the picture, and Stefano comes up with a plan to replace Rafe with someone else, hiring convict Arnold Feniger and giving him plastic surgery to make him identical to Rafe. In the meantime, Nicole's sister, Taylor, arrives, and she and EJ are instantly attracted to each other. Shortly after the wedding, EJ and Taylor begin having an affair. After Nicole and Taylor's mother, Fay, has a heart attack, EJ comforts them and allows Fay to stay at the mansion. Nicole soon learns about the affair and blackmails EJ with what he and his father did to Rafe. EJ asks Taylor to marry him, and she accepts. The truth about the fake Rafe comes out, and Taylor dumps EJ because Arnold killed her mother by pushing her down the stairs when she confronted Arnold about the truth. Arnold decides to testify against EJ and Stefano, but Arnold is killed by other inmates in prison, and EJ and Stefano go free.

EJ decided to run for mayor against his brother-in-law Abe Carver; feeling lonely, he asks Nicole to serve as his campaign manager and convinces her to hold off their divorce. EJ and Nicole became closer during the campaign and had sex. However, to EJ's dismay, Nicole decided to go through with the divorce. Later, EJ revealed he framed John Black for corporate embezzlement and used this to his advantage during campaign season. Johnny goes missing when the Brady family gathers at the Pub before John's trial. EJ and Sami are devastated when a news report claims that Johnny is dead, and to cope with the pain, they end up having sex. They find out that Johnny is not dead and is with Rafe. Nicole told EJ she wanted to give them another chance, and EJ and Nicole reunited. EJ and Sami agreed to keep what happened between them a secret. Sami's son, Will, discovered them and tried to blackmail EJ to help him leave town. EJ turns the tables on Will and reveals that he knows it was Will, not Lucas, who shot him during his wedding to Sami in 2007. He then forced Will to work for him. However, EJ gave Will a race car and agreed to pay Will to work for him. Will agreed and enjoyed his new job with EJ. Will stole Abe's campaign information and handed it over to EJ. EJ won the election. However, the evening was interrupted when Rafe revealed that he found out about Sami and EJ's one-night stand. Nicole left EJ when Rafe broke up with Sami. EJ tried to win back Nicole, but Nicole wanted a reconciliation only if EJ left Salem with her and abandoned his children with Sami. EJ bought Sami an apartment while learning Nicole was pregnant, but Rafe lied and said he was the father of Nicole's baby. EJ didn't believe Rafe was the father and wanted a DNA test to prove the father's identity. Daniel Jones switched the test results; however, even after, EJ still didn't believe that Rafe was the father of his and Nicole's baby.

In early 2012, Nicole reveals to EJ that it was Stefano who attempted to cost him the election; EJ finds out Stefano stole money that he stole from John. Later, he learns from Billie Reed that Stefano destroyed his case against John Black by helping clear his name. Adding more, the family is devastated when Lexie reveals that she is dying from a brain tumor. It shows that when Andre held Lexie in the tunnels, she got a brain tumor. EJ blamed Stefano because Andre worked for him. However, Stefano claims he had nothing to do with it. But this only added to the heat between EJ and Stefano. This all would lead to EJ holding Stefano up at gunpoint, planning to kill him. However, EJ couldn't do it, so he left; however, Stefano was shot in cold blood. EJ became the prime suspect in Stefano's murder and was framed by Ian McAllister. EJ is devastated when Lexie dies from a brain tumor. EJ and Sami grow closer and reconnect; Sami helps EJ prove his innocence. EJ and Sami had no choice but to run to clear EJ's name; however, an explosion happened. Sami saves Ej from the Salem cops, ready to shoot him. The big blast happens in Salem, and Sami almost dies, but EJ can save her with help from the Will. EJ and Sami go to a safe house that belongs to Stefano; EJ and Sami get closer and end up kissing. However, EJ has to find Ian McAllister to confront him, but EJ walks right into a trap set. EJ was Held captive By Ian and Came face to face with Stefano. Ian reveals that Stefano and EJ are, in fact, biological father and son.

Later, EJ got free and took down Ian. Afterward, EJ told Stefano off and said he wanted nothing to do with him. EJ returns to the safe house only to find Sami with Rafe, who arrests both EJ and Sami, but later, EJ and Sami get out of jail. In August 2012, EJ and Sami the two give in to their feelings by kissing, but EJ is discouraged when Sami reveals that she doesn't want to jump into things and want to focus on her work and kids. Sami decides to give EJ a chance. However, Rafe reenters the picture and Sami's life as she begins interacting with him. Rafe tells Sami that EJ is no good for her and kisses Sami, which causes her to end things with EJ. EJ becomes angry and confronts Rafe; EJ heads butt Rafe, and the two end up getting into a fight. However, John and Lucas break it up; EJ decides to get back at Rafe to win Sami back and prove that EJ is the father of Nicole's baby. EJ finds out from Chad that Rafe's sister, Gabi, was behind Melanie's kidnapping. EJ uses this to blackmail Rafe and stay away from Sami; Rafe lets EJ be with Sami, but Sami learns the truth from Chad, gets mad at EJ, and reunites with Rafe. However, EJ got proof that he was the father of Nicole's child but came to find out his son was dead. EJ is heartbroken and grief over the death of his son. However, EJ gets Nicole to confess that Rafe wasn't the father and the baby was their child. EJ records Nicole's confession and confronts both Rafe and Sami, revealing to Sami that Rafe was lying about being the father of Nicole's baby by play records. Sami breaks up with Rafe. EJ decides not to go after Nicole, Daniel, and Rafe; he is shocked by the return of his adopted step-sister, Kristen Blake DiMera. EJ wants to win back Sami, and Kristen reveals that she is working with Sami. Kristen quits her job and gives it to EJ so that he can work with Sami and be closer to her. Sami still loves Rafe, but Sami still has feelings for EJ. EJ and Sami grow closer while working together, and EJ becomes closer to Sami. EJ talks with Caroline Brady; Caroline tells EJ that Sami loves Rafe and EJ and says that maybe EJ can change. After speaking with Caroline, EJ decides to become a better man for Sami. EJ spends Christmas Day and New Year's Eve with her. EJ kisses Sami three times on New Year's Eve, but Rafe kisses Sami. Kate tells EJ that he could lose, once more, to Rafe in the battle for Sami's heart. Sami was going to tell EJ she was getting back together with Rafe, but EJ confessed his love for Sami by telling Sami he loved her and that EJ was in love with her. Sami was speechless, but she still planned to tell EJ.

Sami plans Gabi's wedding to Nick Fallon, which ends when Will reveals that he is the father of Gabi's unborn baby, not Nick. This causes a big fight between Rafe and Sami; this causes her to run into EJ's arms. EJ was there for Sami during Will's custody battle with Nick and Gabi. However, Rafe told EJ that Sami was going to choose Rafe over EJ; EJ was upset about this and went to Sami and confronted her about it. Sami told EJ everything; however, she said she didn't want to throw EJ away, confessed her genuine love for him, and admitted she wanted to be with EJ. EJ took all it in at once and forgave her. EJ and Sami reunite, and later, Sami tells EJ she loves and trusts him. Nick blackmails Will into giving up the rights to his unborn daughter with the information that Will shot EJ in 2007.

Sami asks for EJ's help in getting rid of Nick. Desperate, the two turn to Stefano for help removing the evidence against Will. EJ proposes to Sami in April 2013, and she accepts. Meanwhile, it's revealed that EJ still holds a grudge against Stefano for disowning him as his son, and is seeking revenge by taking DiMera Enterprises from his father. To this end, he enlists the help of Justin Kiriakis to take Stefano down.

Rafe is viciously attacked, and the police and Sami suspect EJ. However, Sami later realizes EJ wasn't responsible. Will saves Nick and Gabi when they are kidnapped by the attacker, Jensen. Will is shot trying to save Nick, while Gabi gives birth to Arianna Grace. EJ comes to the hospital to support Sami while Will is in surgery, and she meets her granddaughter. While there, she also visits Rafe. During a visit, Sami spots a man with a knife at Rafe's bedside and shoots him. EJ later finds out that the man is a corrupt police officer on Stefano's payroll. Though Sami insists the officer was holding a knife, and EJ believes her, the police are not able to find the weapon, and Sami is arrested for the murder of a police officer.

During the trial for Officer Bernardi, to get Samantha out of jail, Ej has to beg his father and gravels to release Samantha. Stefano was the one who set up Sami with Bernardi's murder; an ex-mistress killed the officer, and Stefano framed Sami to control Ej. Like Stefano, he planned to make EJ give back the business to Justin, which he had taken from his father. Also, he had to resign everything back to his father and promise not to leave the mansion ever, even with Samantha and the children. Ej and Sami are happy living at the Dimera mansion, but they must put up with Stefano, who lives under the same roof as them and their children. They get engaged; however, during the engagement party, Bernardi's widow tries to take revenge on Sami and Ej by shooting Ej. Chad7 tries to protect Ej and gets the bullet at his place; he is injured and has to leave Salem with Stefano to get nursed.

EJ then is also caught in another cover-up, the rape of Sami's twin brother Eric by his adopted sister Kristen. He discovers on Kristen's wedding day that she drugged and raped Eric; at first, he is horrified, but then he lets Kristen convince him to cover it in the name of the Dimera family's loyalty. After Kristen is discovered at her wedding, she runs away. However, thanks to a phone text from Kristen to Ej, Sami finds out Ej covered up for Kristen; Ej pretends to Samantha's face he knows nothing about the rape part, that Kristen said it was consensual because he felt torn between his loyalty to his family and his love for Sami. He's tired of Sami's antics and the fact that she doesn't appreciate him more by putting her family above him. He told her he didn't care about her brother but only her. Samantha's trust in Ej is shattered during this time because of his behavior concerning his cover-up for his half-sister Kristen's crimes. As a result, she refuses to make any plans for marriage or a future with EJ despite stating her love for him. He is also banned from Samantha's bedroom. EJ becomes very frustrated when Sami wants to put their relationship on hold.

EJ helps cover the murder that Gabi, Sami, and Kate did to Nick. EJ hired a special team to clean the scene and is always in the corner of Samantha, the love of his life. However, there were still problems between EJ and Sami, which led to fights between the two, which caused more problems, and Sami continued to reject any physical intimacy from Ej. EJ goes to Smith Island and stops Abigail Deveraux from talking to Hope about Nick after Gabi tells him Abby will speak with Hope. EJ speeds off on his private boat and Abby and EJ talk. EJ tries to get Abby not to tell Hope about Nick. Abby believes EJ is having an affair with Gabi, but EJ says that is not true; Abby goes on and says any woman wants to have sex with him. EJ realizes Abby's attraction to him. Knowing this, EJ uses it to stop Abby by kissing her when she is about to go to Hope. EJ stops the kiss and tries to leave Smith Island. However, Abby stops EJ from leaving. She kisses him, and then they begin having sex. After that, Abigail starts to chase Ej at every opportunity. EJ tries several times to reject Abby, but she uses what she thinks happened about Nick's disappearance to get close to Ej and to have a sexual relationship with him. Several times, EJ confronts Abby and tries to get her not to tell anyone. However, Abby tries to blackmail EJ by saying She will tell Hope everything if EJ doesn't give her what she wants. EJ and Abby kiss and almost have sex at the hospital where Abby is working. EJ is on the board as one of the backers but stops when someone nearly comes in. After that, Abigail chases Ej at the gym locker room of his Dimera company, and they have sex in the shower until they hear Sami, and Ej stops the act immediately. Ej and Sami began to slowly reconcile, and once again, Ej tried to persuade Abigail to stop pursuing him and move on. Finally, once and for all, he rejected her.

Sami and EJ would reconcile on Valentine's Day; EJ and Sami kiss. Later, The two would rekindle their love and passionately have sex. EJ moves forward with his wedding to Sami. However, One day, a picture of them kissing at the Horton cabin arrives at the DiMera mansion. EJ hides it from Sami and immediately tries to locate the photographer. After a small investigation, EJ discovers that the photographer was Nick Fallon's assistant, Percy Ruggles. This causes EJ to go after Nick, who first confronts Percy, threatens him to give him the pictures to destroy, and sends him back to England. EJ warns Nick if he tries to ruin his family and tells Sami about the affair, Nick will be sorry. EJ hires a hitman to kill Nick, and Sami agrees to follow EJ's plan. When Nick was shot, this put EJ and Sami on the list of suspects. It was later revealed that their hitman wasn't the one who killed him. Sami and EJ proceed with their wedding, and Sami asks Abigail to be her Maid of honor. While planning her wedding, Sami comes across the photo of Abigail and EJ. She becomes furious but pushes forward with the wedding; after the ceremony, Rafe Hernandez shows up and arrests EJ for tax evasion. While in jail, EJ signs his proxies to Sami so she can go to a board meeting in place of him. Sami attends the board meeting with Kate Roberts (who got Stefano to sign over his proxies to her) and is voted in as DiMera Enterprise's new Co-CEOs. Sami presents this information to a furious EJ and reveals to him that she was the one who gave the police the evidence for his tax evasion arrest. When EJ asked why she was doing this, she revealed that she knew about his hook-up with Abigail and would make him pay. EJ tries to get through to Sami and repeatedly begs for her forgiveness. However, Sami refuses to forgive EJ, but EJ doesn't give up on Sami. To get back the money Sami and Kate stole from Stefano, EJ also negotiates with Victor and takes his drug business, but he is faced with a competitor in newly arrived Clyde Weston, who seems friendly and offers a partnership but wants to take over EJ's territory. Kristen returns to Salem after he kidnaps Daniel; Kristen is locked up and asks EJ for help. However, EJ turns down Kristen and refuses to help her. Later, the affair between EJ and Abby became public Will, which brought EJ and Sami together. Sami asks for EJ's help; however, EJ walks out on Sami, but later, EJ agrees to help if Sami goes out with him to lunch, and Sami agrees. EJ would help Sami win Sami back, and the two became closer again. However, Stefano's return to Salem shakes things up for Sami and Kate.

However, EJ gave Rafe documents on Stefano that hindered his return to Salem to protect Sami and win her back. EJ and Sami eventually reconcile. Sami forgives EJ, and they reunite. EJ and Sami enjoy their happiness. However, EJ's mother Susan Banks returns to Salem and warns EJ his life is in danger. To get revenge on EJ, EJ's brother Chad informs Stefano that EJ helped the Salem Police keep him out of Salem. Stefano angrily disowns EJ, saying he's dead to him. A furious EJ confronts Chad for revealing his betrayal to Stefano, warning Chad that he's unleashing a bitter and vindictive Stefano on EJ, Sami, and their children. Johnny tells EJ the kids at school are teasing him because he's a DiMera; EJ tells Johnny that as he gets older, he'll hear many things about the DiMera family, but it's a name to be proud of. EJ has a confrontation with Clyde over Salem's drug territory and is betrayed, shot, and killed by his disloyal bodyguard, Miguel. Stefano has EJ's sister Kristen inject an unknown substance into EJ's body in the morgue for an unknown reason, saying only that "time is of the essence."

EJ's death causes Sami and her kids to leave Salem and move to Los Angeles, California.

=== 2015–2018 ===
In 2015, there were signs that EJ was still alive; Sami got a letter from EJ saying that if he were dead, then Stefano was the cause. The letter was over a year old and contained nothing about Clyde Weston. Sami states that EJ wrote things only she and EJ knew, and the letter instructed Sami to get the codes that drained all of Stefano's money from his secret accounts.

When EJ's sister Kristen (Stacy Haiduk) returns to Salem in August 2018 for John and Marlena's wedding, she reveals that EJ is alive and offers to tell Sami where he is, provided she shoots John. In September 2018, Kristen revealed to Stefan DiMera (Tyler Christopher) details about EJ being alive. Sami agrees to transfer funds he needs to sustain losses suffered by DiMera Enterprises in return for the information about EJ's whereabouts. Stefan reveals to Sami that under Stefano's instructions, Kristen injected EJ with a drug that kept him alive, sneaking him out of the hospital and that Stefano had Sami believe EJ was dead and that EJ's body was never cremated. While Sami grieved EJ's "death," Kristen delivered EJ to Stefano. Stefan tells Sami that EJ is recovering at a private facility. When Brady Black (Eric Martsolf) sneaks into the facility, he finds Xander Kiriakis working with Kristen on a secret project that is revealed to be EJ's recovery. There, it is revealed that EJ's recovery is not as easy as intended, with him losing his ability to speak.

== Reception ==
Scott's performance earned him a Daytime Emmy nomination for Outstanding Lead Actor in a Drama Series in 2010 and 2011. In 2020, Charlie Mason from Soaps She Knows placed EJ 11th on his list of the 35 most memorable characters from Days of Our Lives, commenting that "When James Scott's spawn of Stefano blackmailed No. 4 [Sami Brady] into shagging him, that should've been the end of our — all of our — infatuation with him. Instead, it was just another chapter of a story that we couldn't wait to finish — and don't want to believe has been ended."

== See also ==
- EJ DiMera and Sami Brady
- List of soap opera villains
