= Rafe Hernandez =

- Days of Our Lives character
- Portrayed by: Galen Gering
- Duration: 2008–present
- First appearance: October 31, 2008
- Created by: Dena Higley and Christopher Whitesell
- Introduced by: Ken Corday and Gary Tomlin
In-universe information
- Other names: Mr. Garcia; Rafael Alejandro Hernandez
- Occupation: Commissioner; Police detective; Nightclub manager; FBI agent; ISA agent; Private Investigator
- Parents: Eduardo Hernandez; Adriana Hernandez
- Brothers: Dario Hernandez
- Sisters: Arianna Hernandez; Gabi Hernandez
- Half-sisters: Paige Larson
- Spouse: Sami Brady (2010–2012); Hope Brady (2018–2019); Nicole Walker (2022–2023)
- Aunts: Estrella
- Nieces: Arianna Horton

Rafe Hernandez is a fictional character on Days of Our Lives, an American soap opera on the NBC network. Portrayed by Galen Gering and created by Dena Higley, Rafe is introduced in 2008 as the FBI agent assigned to protect the troublesome Sami Brady (Alison Sweeney) during her stay in witness protection. Sami and Rafe's contentious dynamic later develops into romance and the two fall in love and eventually marry. However, their romance is plagued by Sami's supercouple romance with Salem's resident badboy, EJ DiMera (James Scott). Rafe's disdain for the DiMera family grows when he discovers that EJ is behind the kidnapping and presumed death of Sami's daughter Sydney and EJ's father Stefano (Joseph Mascolo) replaces Rafe with a doppelganger. The series also introduces Rafe's younger sisters, Arianna (Lindsay Hartley) and Gabi (Camila Banus) and later his younger brother Dario (Jordi Vilasuso). Rafe is very protective of his siblings having helped raise them when their father abandoned the family. Rafe also has an affair with Kate Roberts (Lauren Koslow) putting him at odds with Stefano, Kate's ex-husband. He later falls in love with physical therapist Jordan Ridgeway (Chrishell Stause) whom he tries to help overcome her own dark past. In 2015, Rafe is forced to confront his past when his estranged father Eduardo (A Martinez) resurfaces. Rafe later falls in love with his longtime colleague Hope Brady (Kristian Alfonso) and supports her when she loses her true love to a brain tumor. When a grief-stricken Hope murders Stefano, Rafe helps her cover it up. Later storylines include raising Jordan's son, David, and his devastation when David's aunt gains custody of him, and developing a relationship with Ava Vitali (Tamara Braun).

== Storylines ==
In October 2008, Federal Agent Rafe arrived in Salem to relay information to Sami Brady and her guard, who had been assigned to her as part of the witness protection program. As Sami had become increasingly agitated by her isolation, she had slipped sleeping pills to her guard and knocking her unconscious. As a result, Rafe was permanently assigned to guard Sami, with whom he initially had a combative relationship. As time went on, however, Rafe and Sami began to form a friendship. While Rafe kept fairly quiet about his personal life, he did tell Sami that as a young child, he frequented a local convent due to his troubling behavior. Rafe became one of the very few people to learn that Sami was pregnant with the child of E.J. DiMera (James Scott), and agreed to help her conceal this fact. As time went on, Rafe began to develop feelings for Sami and after her stint in Witness Protection ended, he pursued a position within the Salem Police Department so he might remain close to Sami and her baby. Rafe also began to reconnect with his younger sister, Arianna (then Felisha Terrell), who had concerns over his involvement with Sami. Despite Arianna's disapproval, Rafe continued to pursue Sami and asked her if he could legally adopt her baby, who they had named Grace. Tragically, several months later, Grace died from complications due to bacterial meningitis, leaving Sami and Rafe utterly devastated.

Following Grace's death, Sami began to observe an emotional distance in Rafe and came to discover him at the graveside of a woman named Emily Hudson. Rafe revealed to Sami that he was once engaged to marry Emily, but she died on the day of their wedding in a tragic accident. When Sami began to investigate Rafe's past, which he would not elaborate upon, she turned up very little. Shortly afterwards, Emily's vengeful sister Meredith arrived in Salem, and after kidnapping Rafe, she attempted to kill him as she held him responsible for Emily's death. Rafe was rescued by Carly Manning (Crystal Chappell), who had recently returned to Salem following over fifteen years away. Following his recovery, Rafe began to investigate Nicole Walker (Arianne Zuker), as he developed a theory that she had switched Grace with Sami's biological child. After collecting DNA samples from Sami, and the child, Sydney, Rafe was able to perform a DNA test and confirm that Sydney was in fact Sami's daughter. With Nicole's scheme exposed, she responded by abducting Sydney and leaving Salem. While she was on the run, Nicole encountered Anna Fredericks (Leann Hunley), who in turn kidnapped Sydney from Nicole. Anna began sending ransom notes to Sami, threatening her not involve the police. As a result, Sami began confiding in E.J. and leaving Rafe in the dark, resulting in Rafe ending their relationship.

Despite the end of his relationship with Sami, Rafe continued to investigate Sydney's abduction and became convinced that Anna was working alongside E.J. Despite his efforts to convince Anna to turn on E.J., Rafe was unsuccessful. By chance, Rafe observed a suspicious conversation between E.J. and Nicole on the Salem Pier that seemed to strengthen his theory. Rafe became convinced that E.J. had confessed his involvement in the abduction to Nicole and could somehow persuade her to reveal his involvement. In an effort to gain her confession, Rafe attempted to convince Nicole he was interested in her. After a few drinks at The Cheatin' Heart, Nicole and Rafe headed back to her apartment, and stopped short of sleeping together. He remained the night anyway, and used this time to search Nicole's apartment for evidence to incriminate E.J. in Sydney's abduction, eventually stumbling upon a recording of E.J. admitting to paying Anna to kidnap Sydney. Rafe confronted Nicole with the recording, and assured her immunity from prosecution should she authenticate the recording.

During Rafe's investigation into Sydney's kidnapping, E.J. and Sami had reconnected and were engaged to be married. On their wedding day, Rafe aired the recording of E.J.'s confession at their ceremony, resulting in Sami leaving E.J. Rafe and Sami reunited, resulting in him proposing to her. As they spent the night together, Sami snuck out intent on confronting E.J., whom she found unconscious and holding a gun. Sami used the gun to shoot E.J. in the head, and then proceeded to toss it into the river. When Sami's uncle, Bo Brady (Peter Reckell) questioned her about E.J.'s shooting, Rafe insisted that Sami was with him at the time of the shooting. Sami confessed her involvement in E.J.'s shooting to Rafe, and despite his dedication to the law, Rafe handed in his resignation to the FBI and swore to protect Sami at all costs. E.J. soon discovered Sami's guilt in his shooting, and began blackmailing her for sole custody of their two children, Johnny and Sydney. If she refused his demands, he would turn her, as well as Rafe and her eldest son, Will Horton (then Chandler Massey) in as accessories to attempted murder. With her back against the wall, a devastated Sami agreed to E.J.'s demands. Rafe assured Sami that he would do whatever he had to help her regain custody of the children, and in order to have one last happy memory before the hard times to follow, suggested they have the wedding that night. Sami agreed, and she and Rafe were married in November 2010.

Following their wedding, Rafe joined the Salem Police Department and began investigating E.J, hoping to uncover evidence against him and send him to prison. Rafe's investigation was quickly stalled, when it was discovered that Johnny had cancer. Rafe stood by Sami throughout the cancer ordeal, especially when Johnny needed to have one of his eyes removed. Johnny's cancer was discovered to have spread to his remaining eye, but as the doctors had caught it in time, they were able to treat it and spare his vision. With Johnny's crisis averted, E.J. began to allow Sami back into her children's lives. However, Rafe continued to remain in E.J.'s crosshairs.

== Development ==
=== Casting and creation ===
In late August 2008, rumors circulated that former Passions star Galen Gering, known for his role of Luis Lopez-Fitzgerald was in-talks to join the cast of Days. However, news of Gering's casting was not formally announced until late September 2008. Gering would take on the newly created role of FBI agent Rafael. Gering made his first appearance on October 31, 2008. "It took longer that I had anticipated," Gering said of the casting process. Forbes March, known for his role as Nash Brennan on One Life to Live, and Wes Ramsey also auditioned for the role. Gering signed onto the series a few months after shooting his final episode of Passions. While Gering comes from both Jewish and Spanish heritage, he is usually cast in Latino roles. Gering said he didn't mind being typecast. "It's paying the bills!" Executive producer Ken Corday was unfamiliar with Gering's work so he had to audition for the role but co-executive producer, Gary Tomlin "championed" his casting. Gering and Tomlin worked together on Passions when Tomlin for the series. The actor admitted that he didn't know much about Rafe, but had a meeting Tomlin who assured him that his potential storyline would be a "great" one. Gering said of his casting, "When I joined the soap, it was a weird time at DAYS" as the series had just fired their biggest stars in Deidre Hall and Drake Hogestyn. They were also unsure of if they'd even still be on the air. Gering noted the irony in returning to the set because he had auditioned for Passions on the set of Days of Our Lives. Gering said of his initial plans for the character, "I didn't want Rafe to be this one-note FBI guy. I wanted him to be quirky." However, he didn't have time to have much input because of how fast the swift production style. He described the character as a "great marriage of acting and writing." In contrast to Passions, Gering said, "It’s clear and concise and well driven and well written, but I really like this character, Rafe." In March 2026, it was revealed Gering had been demoted to recurring status.

=== Relationships ===
The character of Rafe was first paired with Sweeney's Sami Brady. Gering appreciated the slow burn pacing of the romance. "I think they did a great job allowing the audience to see Sami and Rafe fall in love." "I always liked her personality and her spunky fire, so I'm really excited to be working with her" Gering said of his costar. Rafe is forced to be Sami's new bodyguard in witness protection after she sabotages the first two. However, Sami's usual scheming behavior does not fly with Rafe. Gering said "Sami's definitely met her match." Their contentious relationship eventually blossoms into romance, and the duo eventually marries in November 2010. Gering said "I think they are soul-mates." Rafe and Sami "compliment [sic] each other very well and support one another." He continued, "I think they definitely have what it takes to last long-term." However, most of their relationship is plagued by Sami's longstanding romance with EJ DiMera (James Scott), the kidnapping and presumed deaths of two of her children, and when EJ's father, Stefano (Joseph Mascolo) replaces Rafe with a doppelganger. Sami and Rafe eventually break up over a disagreement with Nick and Gabi raising Will's baby, causing her to run to EJ.

== Reception ==
Dan J. Kroll said Gering's introduction would provide comfort for fans of the cancelled Passions. Gering's debut was mostly well received by viewers. Nelson Branco was "worried" when Gering joined the cast but Rafe soon become one of his favorite characters. Branco likened the character to Peter Reckell's legendary Bo Brady as the resident hero of the series. By 2011, Gering had solidified his place as a "fan favorite." Hayley Farb said "Galen Gering has portrayed every woman's prince charming." Farb also praised Gering's portrayal of Rafe's doppelgänger. "His underestimated talent reached new heights through his dual role."
