= Nicole Walker =

Fictional character from Days of Our Lives

- Days of our Lives character
- Portrayed by: Arianne Zucker
- Duration: 1998–2006; 2008–2024
- First appearance: February 27, 1998
- Last appearance: July 29, 2024
- Created by: Sally Sussman Morina
- Introduced by: Ken Corday and Tom Langan (1998); Ken Corday and Edward J. Scott (2008); Ken Corday, Albert Alarr and Greg Meng (2018, 2019)
- Spin-off appearances: Days of Our Lives: A Very Salem Christmas (2021)
In-universe information
- Other names: Nicole Mendez; Nicole Stella Walker; Nicole Roberts; Nicole Kiriakis; Nicole DiMera; Nicole Brady; Nicole Hernandez; Misty Circle; Mary Smith; Mary; Bridget Smith
- Occupation: Businesswoman; Journalist; Secretary; Campaign manager; Editor-in-chief; Model; Waitress; Pornographic actress
- Father: Paul Mendez
- Mother: Fay Walker
- Sisters: Taylor Walker
- Half-brothers: Brandon Walker
- Spouse: Trent Robbins (until 2008); Lucas Roberts (1999–2002) (Note: Their marriage was deemed invalid as it was later revealed Nicole was still legally married to Trent Robbins); Victor Kiriakis (2002–2008) (Note: After their divorce on August 5, 2008, Victor and Nicole's marriage was deemed invalid when it was revealed that she was still legally married to Trent Robbins); EJ DiMera (2009–2010, 2011–2012, 2023–2024); Xander Kiriakis (2018–2019); Eric Brady (2020–2021); Rafe Hernandez (2022–2023)
- Sons: Daniel DiMera; Jude Roman Brady
- Daughters: Holly Jonas
- Stepsons: Johnny DiMera
- Stepdaughters: Sydney DiMera

Nicole Walker is a fictional character on the NBC soap opera Days of Our Lives, a long-running series about working-class life in the fictional town of Salem. She was introduced in 1998 by head writer Sally Sussman Morina, and executive producer Ken Corday. Actress Arianne Zucker has portrayed the character since her introduction to the series in 1998. In 2006, Zucker left the soap in pursuit of other acting possibilities. She returned to the role in 2008. In 2016, Zucker also appeared as Helena Tasso, a deceased woman who bears a resemblance to Nicole, in flashbacks. In March 2017, Zucker announced she would once again leave the role. She made her final appearance in the role on October 20, 2017. Following her departure, media outlets began to report that Zucker was to reprise the role for a short-term visit in December 2017 after being spotted on-set; Zucker explained her visit, stating that her daughter was included in the annual telling of the Christmas Story at the University Hospital.

In June 2018, it was announced that Zucker would reprise the role of Nicole later the same year. She appeared for a few weeks in October 2018. Zucker later returned in April 2019 but, as Kristen DiMera, who was posing as Nicole. Zucker then returned to the role of Nicole in September 2019. In a February 2024 wrongful termination lawsuit filing, accusing producers/production of retaliating against her for a sexual harassment complaint she made against co-executive producer/director Albert Alarr (who was fired in August 2023 following an internal investigation), it was announced Zucker's deal with the soap was not renewed. Zucker filmed her final episodes in January 2024, and Nicole exited in July 29 of the same year.

Many of Nicole's storylines have focused on treachery, death, and love, with the character being portrayed as always in pursuit of finding true love and having the family she never had as a child growing up. The character is the daughter of Fay Walker and Paul Mendez. During her childhood, Nicole was a victim of child sexual abuse at the hands of her father, Paul, who forced her to do pornography in her adolescence under the name "Misty Circle". The character came to Salem as a small-town waitress, but almost immediately started getting involved with the major families that the show revolved around. While once being seen as a scheming gold-digger, Nicole has grown into a woman committed to finding love and being a good mother. She is known for her longstanding feud with her enemy, Sami Brady, her relationships with Eric Brady, Victor Kiriakis, Brady Black and EJ DiMera, and the 2009 Baby Switch story line which featured Nicole having a miscarriage; lying to her husband; and stealing Sami's baby, Sydney.

Zucker's performance in the role has been met with favorable reception from audiences and critics, having garnered her two nominations for the Daytime Emmy Award for Outstanding Supporting Actress in a Drama Series in 2010 and 2013. In 2014 and 2020, she received her third and fourth Daytime Emmy nominations in the Outstanding Lead Actress in a Drama Series category.

== Storylines ==
=== 1998–2006 ===
Overworked and underpaid waitress Nicole comes to Salem with dreams of becoming a model and meets Eric Brady (Jensen Ackles). Eric convinces his sister Sami (Alison Sweeney) to give Nicole a modeling contract, landing Nicole on the cover of Bella magazine. Despite her success, Nicole seems to be hiding something. It is eventually revealed that Nicole is being followed by her ex-boyfriend, Jay. As Eric and Nicole fall in love, a jealous Jay threatens to tell Nicole's secrets. Nicole develops friendships with Sami and Kate Roberts (Lauren Koslow), even planning Sami's bachelorette party. Kate's son and Sami's ex-boyfriend Lucas (Bryan Dattilo) starts showering Nicole with gifts despite his mother's disapproval; Lucas wants to use Nicole to get custody of his son Will from Sami. Meanwhile, Nicole's sister, Taylor Raines (Katherine Ellis), comes to Salem and befriends Eric and Lucas uses the relationship to keep Nicole and Eric apart so he can have her for himself. Taylor catches on to Lucas's schemes and skips town while Nicole agrees to marriage in exchange for $5 million, leaving Eric devastated and running him out of town. When Victor Kiriakis (John Aniston) takes the money away from her, Nicole decides to help Sami regain custody of Will. Also, a brief cancer scare forces Nicole to realize the error of her ways. She shares a brief reunion with Eric and divorces Lucas. However, Eric helps Nicole open up about her troubled past and being forced into porn as a teenager by her father, Paul Mendez. Nicole cozies up to Victor by exposing Kate's plot to kill him and also uses his grandson Brady Black (Kyle Lowder) in her schemes. Victor and Nicole eventually marry on New Year's Eve in 2002 only for Nicole to fake his death with the help of Jan Spears (Heather Lauren Olson), leaving Nicole as the wealthy grieving widow who has fallen for her step-grandson. However, Nicole's plans begin to unravel when Victor is discovered alive. Meanwhile, in an effort to keep Brady for herself, Nicole tries to disfigure his presumed-dead first love, Chloe Lane (Nadia Bjorlin), during surgery with help from Stan (Dan Wells) and Tony DiMera (Thaao Penghlis). Nicole learns that Stan is actually Sami in disguise and threatens to expose her. However, Sami exposes Nicole's schemes instead and Brady kicks her out of his life believing she was behind Chloe's "death." Nicole later goes into business with Sami and Austin Reed (Austin Peck). In 2006, she agrees to move to Los Angeles to manage the newly acquired branch of the company. Before leaving town, Nicole has a one-night stand with Sami's father, Roman Brady (Josh Taylor).

After her departure, it is mentioned that Nicole had plans to marry "some soap actor." This was presumably a nod to Zucker's marriage to her former Days of Our Lives costar Kyle Lowder, who played Brady.

=== 2008–present ===
Nicole resurfaces in 2008 and announces that she and Victor are still legally married. Nicole hires EJ DiMera (James Scott) to help her with the divorce only for Nicole to discover that she is still married to her first husband, Trent Robbins (Roscoe Born), making her subsequent marriages to Lucas and Victor invalid. Nicole had married Trent when she was in college but she left him because he was abusive; however, she never filed for divorce. EJ starts using Nicole to make his soon to be ex-wife Sami jealous and after Sami dumps him, EJ and Nicole end up having sex in an elevator. Nicole is a prime suspect when Trent is found dead in September 2008, but she is exonerated. Nicole later discovers she is pregnant, and knowing she was not supposed to have children, Nicole considers the child to be a "miracle." EJ and Nicole move in together only for her to miscarry. Realizing that EJ loved their baby and not her, Nicole fakes her pregnancy fearing he will leave her. Nicole discovers that EJ is still in love with Sami, so she adopts Mia McCormick (Taylor Spreitler)'s baby with help from Dr. Richard Baker (John Callahan) and passes the child off as her own. To make matters worse, Nicole switches Mia's child with Sami and EJ's baby allowing EJ to raise the child even though Sami planned to keep him from the child. Nicole names the child, Sydney only for her lies to be exposed when the child's father, Chad Peterson-Woods (Casey Deidrick) tries to sue for custody. Nicole is sent to prison for her crimes and later released with the help of Anna DiMera (Leann Hunley).

Seeing that Nicole is still attached to Sydney, EJ arranges for her to be a part of Sydney's life and live in the mansion leading him to propose to her for Nicole to be a "mother figure" to EJ's children. Nicole accepts leading her to start falling in love with him again. On their wedding day, EJ meets Nicole's sister Taylor (Natalia Livingston) and it is love at first sight. After weeks of cheating, EJ asks Nicole for a divorce and she is left shattered. Nicole is employed as EJ's secretary and they start working together for EJ to win the election and become Mayor of Salem. During the election their romantic relationship evolves but Nicole holds back fearing that EJ will end up hurting her again. When he proposes to her in February 2012, Nicole accepts only to find out that EJ had cheated on her once again with Sami. She storms out of the mansion and goes to the Town Square where she meets Daniel Jonas (Shawn Christian). During their talk Nicole faints and Daniel takes her to the hospital only to find out that Nicole is pregnant.

Nicole worries about her pregnancy ending in a miscarriage again and, wanting to get away from EJ, she hides her pregnancy from him with the help of Daniel and Rafe Hernandez (Galen Gering). EJ finds out that Nicole is pregnant and Rafe steps in, claiming the child is his, leading him and Nicole to fabricate this story to keep the baby from EJ. In May 2012, Nicole stresses over EJ and starts having pains in her stomach but gets to the hospital in time and everything turns out to be fine. Nicole begins a romantic relationship with Daniel but due to his daughter's priorities at the time, he broke it off. In August 2012, an earthquake hits Salem and Nicole goes into preterm labor, but luckily Daniel manages to stop the contractions and keep the pregnancy healthy. She then starts a rivalry with Jennifer Horton (Melissa Reeves), fearing that Daniel will get back together with Jenn. In October 2012 and at 37 weeks pregnant, Nicole goes to her prenatal visit but her doctor informs her that her baby is dead. A distraught Nicole grieves her second loss but does not tell Daniel fearing that he will get back together with Jenn seeing there is no baby. That same day Nicole gets into a fight with Jennifer on the stairs of the Town Square and Nicole falls down going into labor. Nicole gives birth to her stillborn son and seeing the opportunity she blames Jennifer in pushing her. A month later the truth comes out and seeing she is left with nothing, she tries to commit suicide but Rafe and Daniel step in just in time to stop her.

Nicole's first love, Eric Brady (Greg Vaughan), returns to Salem as a priest. He offers her a job as his secretary at the church, which Nicole accepts. As the two continue working together, Nicole's old feelings for Eric resurface. Knowing that he is a priest and cannot be with her, Nicole aches about not being with him. In June 2013, Eric is drugged and seduced by Kristen DiMera. Due to coincidences that happened that night, such as Nicole finding a delirious Eric in his hotel room shortly after Kristen leaves, Eric is led to believe that it was Nicole who raped him. He confronts her about the matter. While Nicole admits her feelings towards him during the confrontation, she repeatedly denies any wrongdoing. Eric does not believe her, concluding that Nicole acted on her feelings. Dismayed by Eric's false accusation, Nicole does not want to have anything to do with Eric. After Eric is suspended from the priesthood due to the sex scandal, Nicole forgives him, and together with Daniel, they work together to prove Eric's innocence. Knowing that Eric would deny her help due to her feelings for him, Nicole fabricates a fake romance with Daniel, assuring Eric she is over him. The lie shocks both Daniel and Eric. Daniel is initially reluctant at first, as Nicole had made up the lie before informing him, but he agrees to play along, blindsiding Eric. Since finding out about Nicole's new romance, Eric begins to have dreams about Nicole and is unsure how he feels about her. As Nicole and Eric begin spending more time together to clear his name, Eric's old feelings for Nicole resurface. This becomes especially apparent after Nicole's photo shoot, when Eric reminisces about an old photo shoot with Nicole during her modeling days with Countess Wilhelmina. Nicole and Eric's relationship becomes more mutual, leaving both of them confused and unsure how to react. On January 13, 2014, Nicole and Eric are kidnapped by Kristen's potion doctor, as the two have gotten too close to the truth about the night Eric was drugged. The doctor tied them together in the basement of Daniel's apartment complex. He initially was going to wipe their memories with his drugs, but instead opens a gas line in the basement and leaves Nicole and Eric to die, either by asphyxiation or an eventual explosion. It is in this dire situation Eric confesses he loves Nicole. She was engaged to Eric briefly but they broke up and now she is currently engaged to Daniel. Sadly, on New Year's Eve of 2015, Brady, his stepbrother Eric, Jennifer Horton, and Daniel are involved in a tragic car accident due to Eric driving drunk. The accident leaves Daniel brain dead, and Brady in need of a heart transplant. With Maggie's permission, Daniel is taken off of life support and his heart is donated to Brady. Eric is later sent to prison for causing Daniel's death, leaving Nicole heartbroken. In 2016, Chloe Lane attempts a second surrogacy for Nicole after a failed first attempt. In a snowstorm with Chloe, Nicole unknowingly delivers her own child conceived through in vitro fertilisation. Chloe tells her to name the baby before losing consciousness. Nicole names the baby girl Holly and later learns the child belongs to her and the late Daniel Jonas. This makes Maggie Horton the baby's paternal grandmother.

Nicole gets engaged to Deimos Kiriakis but she later breaks up with him. In 2017, Nicole begins seeing Eric again, who has recently been released from prison. A jealous and heartbroken Brady blackmails Nicole, and forces her to break up with Eric and leave town. In 2018, Eric finds out the truth about why Nicole left, and that October, it is revealed that Nicole has been living in Nashville, Tennessee at Sarah Horton (Linsey Godfrey)'s old apartment with Holly. When Eric arrives to confess his love for her, she reveals she is married to Xander, who is blackmailing her with a recording that reveals her as Deimos' killer. When Nicole escapes Xander's hold, she travels to a warehouse to meet with Eric; there, she becomes trapped, and ostensibly dies after an explosion. The following year, "Nicole" suddenly reappears alive, but is revealed to be Kristen in a mask and wig, using Nicole's identity to try and seduce Brady into taking her back. Kristen's plan ultimately backfired after she was exposed at John and Marlena's anniversary party. That September, the real Nicole is revealed to be alive and living in Chicago. It is revealed that she willingly let Kristen steal her identity to protect Holly. Eric brings them back to Salem and resumes a relationship with Nicole. The pair briefly split up when it is revealed that Nicole kept the secret of Eric being the father of Sarah's baby, Mackenzie Horton. However, it is revealed that the child was switched at birth by Xander with Rachel Black, the baby of Kristen and Brady. After 23 years since meeting, Nicole and Eric get married in July 2020 (set in 2021).

== Reception ==
In 2020, Charlie Mason from Soaps She Knows put Nicole on their list of the 35 most memorable characters from Days of Our Lives, commenting "Can you point to another character on this list who, like Arianne Zucker’s, has been everything from a porn star to a church secretary? No? Then sit the frack down. Nicole deserves her damn spot at No. 14."

In 2024, as part of their year-end review, Soap Opera News editor Michael Thomas listed Zucker's exit with Vaughan as their second most-shocking soap opera exit of the year. Zucker also tied with Annika Noelle (as Hope Logan on The Bold and the Beautiful) as the fourth-top female performer.
