= Dan Feuerriegel =

Australian actor

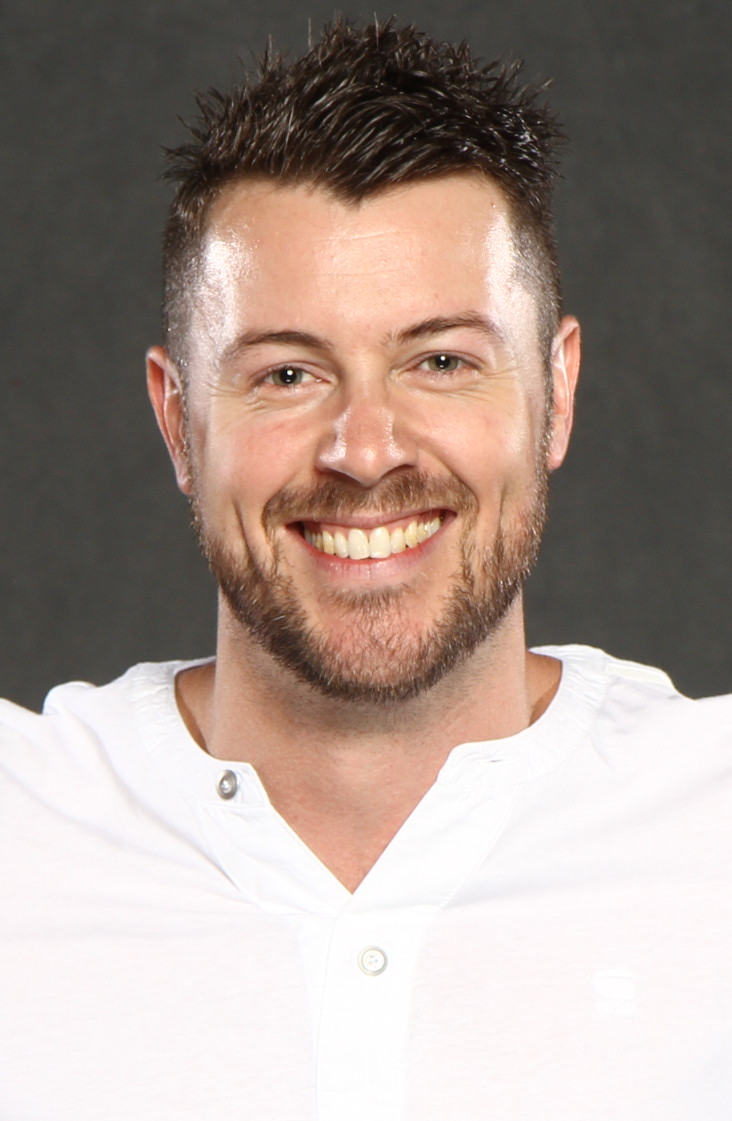
- Feuerriegel at the 2014 Florida SuperCon
- Born: Daniel Gregory Feuerriegel; 29 October 1981 (age 44); Sydney, New South Wales, Australia
- Other names: Fury King
- Occupation: Actor
- Years active: 2004–present

Daniel Gregory Feuerriegel (born 29 October 1981) is an Australian actor who is based in Los Angeles, California, United States. He has acted in a number of Australian television series and first came to international notice with his role as a gladiator recruit "Agron" in the series Spartacus: Blood and Sand, Spartacus: Vengeance and Spartacus: War of the Damned. Since June 2021, he has appeared on the NBC/Peacock soap opera, Days of Our Lives as EJ DiMera.

== Biography ==
In 1998, Feuerriegel graduated from Villanova College, a Roman Catholic college located in the Brisbane suburb of Coorparoo. He studied acting at the Queensland University of Technology in Brisbane. He graduated in 2002.

== Career ==
- He featured in the 2005 controversial short Boys Grammar which also starred Jai Courtney and Adam J. Yeend.
- He also joined the cast of Small Claims: White Wedding in 2005.
- In 2006 he appeared in Burke & Wills and the short film True, the same year he starred as a recurring character on the hit series McLeod's Daughters where he played Leo Coombes for five episodes, and also appeared in the series Stupid Stupid Man where he played Kim in the episode "The Reunion".
- He joined the cast of Between the Flags (short film) in 2007.
- In 2008 he appeared in a recurring role on the hit series Home and Away where he played the journalist Gavin Johnson. the same year he guest starred in an episode of The Strip, along with Aaron Jeffery.
- In 2009 he played Brendan in the Australian series All Saints, earlier, in 2006 he played Cameron "Indy" Jones in the series.
- In 2010 he played Agron, a gladiator recruit, in the Starz hit series Spartacus: Blood and Sand. Feuerriegel continued this role in 2012 through the third season of the show, entitled Spartacus: Vengeance, and the show's fourth and final season, entitled Spartacus: War of the Damned, in 2013.
- In 31 March 2021, it was reported that he would be taking over the role of EJ DiMera in NBC's Days of our Lives, and would make his debut in mid-2021. On 21 May it was confirmed that he was cast in the role, and would make his debut on 9 June.

== Filmography ==
Year	Film	Role	Notes
2005	Small Claims: White Wedding	Brendan Rigby	
2005	Boys Grammar	Ben	Short film
2006	Burke & Wills	Guy	
2006	True	Russell	Short film
2007	Between the Flags	First Guy	Short film
2012	Ruin	Fighter	Short film
2014	Cryptic	Jim Jonas	
2015	Vy Nguyen & Keith Jackson feat. Jason Chu, No Hero Now	Deathstalker	Short film
2018	Pacific Rim Uprising	Lieutenant Allan Gronetti	
2021	Days of Our Lives: A Very Salem Christmas	EJ DiMera	Peacock Original Movie

== Television ==
Year	Title	Role	Notes
2006	RAN: Remote Area Nurse	Ben	Episode "The Gardens of the Torres Strait"
2006	McLeod's Daughters	Leo Coombes	5 episodes
2006	Stupid Stupid Man	Kim	Episode "The Reunion"
2006, 2009	All Saints	Cameron "Indy" Jones / Brendan	Episodes "Jaws of Death" & "Out of the Ashes"
2008	Home and Away	Gavin Johnson	9 episodes
2008	The Strip	Rhys Roberts	Episode 1.5
2010	Spartacus: Blood and Sand	Agron	5 episodes
2012	Spartacus: Vengeance	Agron	10 episodes
2013	Spartacus: War of the Damned	Agron	10 episodes
2015	Agents of S.H.I.E.L.D.	Spud	Episode "A Wanted (Inhu)man"
2016	Travel Boobs (web series)	Mark	Episodes "Stranded" &"The Proposal"
2017	Chicago Fire	Will Tucker	Episode "A Breaking Point"
2018	NCIS: Los Angeles	Angus Reeves	Episode "Outside the Lines"
2021–	Days of Our Lives	EJ DiMera	Main Role

== Theatre ==
Year	Play	Role	Director	Theatre	Notes
2004	Sleeping Around	Greg	Katy Alexander	Belvoir Theatre	alongside Craig Brown Jacobie Gray & Charlotte Gregg
2004	Little Malcolm and His Struggle Against the Eunuchs	Ingham	Amos Szeps	Old Fitzroy Theatre	alongside Jacobie Gray & Ash Lyons
–	The Beauty Queen of Leenane	Ray	Winston Cooper	New Theatre	–
–	Song of the Yellow Bittern	Vince	Moelisea Stafford	–	–
–	Pink Floyd's – The Wall	Ensemble	John O’Hare	–	–
–	The Jungle	Jimmy	Leonard Meenach	–	–
–	The Merchant of Venice	Prince of Arragon & Balthazar	Diane Eden & Peter Lavery	–	–
–	Histories	Ensemble	Gavin Robins	–	–
–	Rent	Benny	Deborah McCauslane	–	–
–	Three Sisters	Solyony	Jeffery Renn	–	–
–	Soiled	Ensemble	Deborah McCauslane	–	–
–	They Shoot Horses Don't They?	Ensemble	Leonard Meenach	–	–
–	Spurboard	Ensemble	David Lynch	–	–
