= James Scott (actor) =

English actor (born 1979)

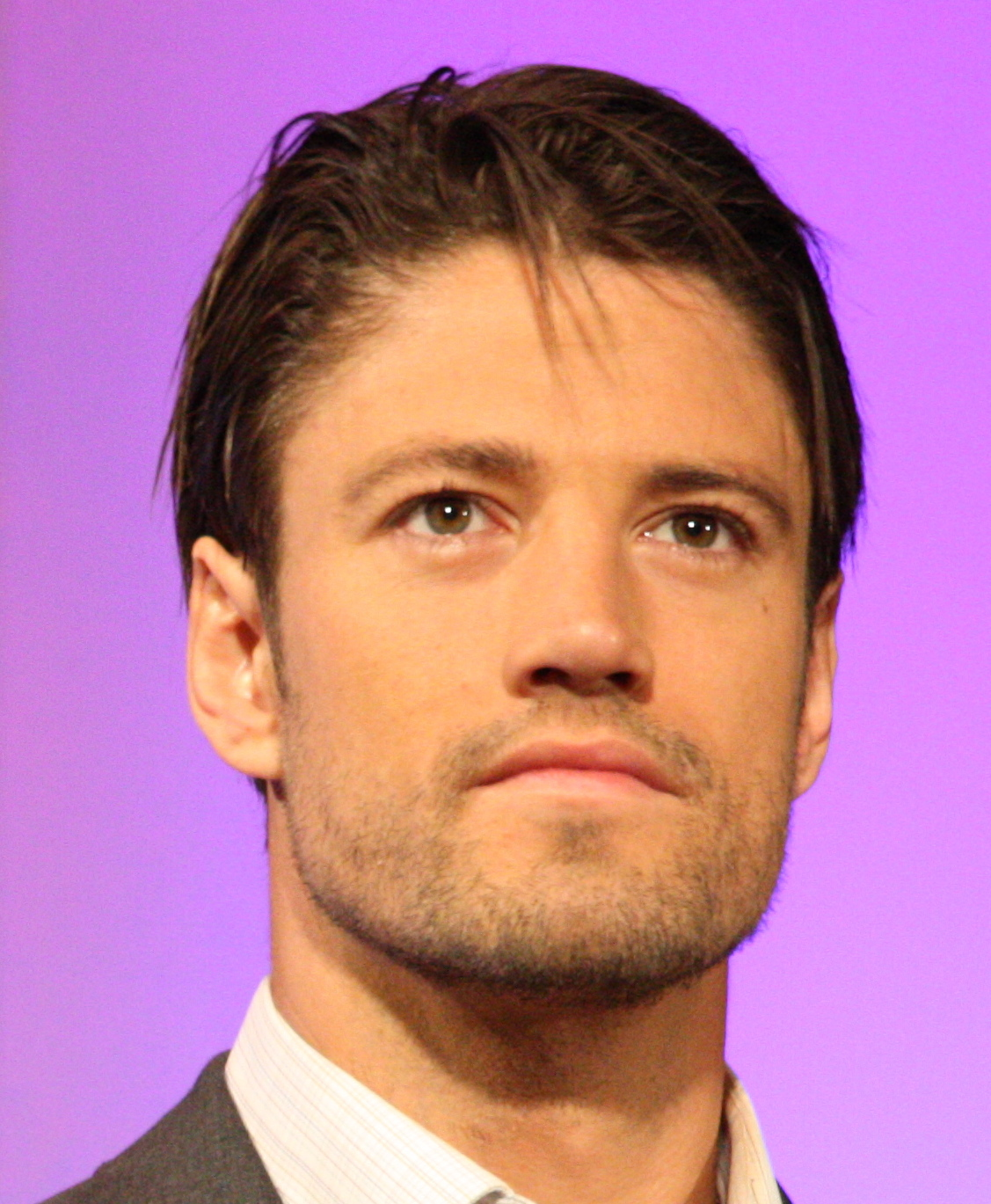
- Scott in 2008
- Born: 14 January 1979 (age 47); Newcastle upon Tyne, England, United Kingdom
- Occupation: Actor
- Years active: 2004–2016
- Spouse: Kaitlin Robinson (m. 2015; div. 2016)

James Scott (born 14 January 1979) is a British former actor from Newcastle upon Tyne, England. He is best known for playing EJ DiMera on the NBC soap opera Days of Our Lives and Ethan Cambias on the ABC soap opera All My Children.

== Early life ==
Scott was born in Newcastle upon Tyne to an English father and Scottish mother. The eldest of four children, he has two brothers and a sister. Initially schooled in Newcastle, Scott moved to an all-boys boarding school in Lancaster.

After school, Scott moved to Edinburgh on a voyage of self-discovery. As a result of his mother's Scottish origins, Scott spent a lot of time in Scotland as a boy. His first summer there he managed to get a job working at the famous "Gilded Balloon Theatre", one of the Edinburgh Festival Fringe's best-known venues, established by Karen Koren in 1986 in Edinburgh's Cowgate and worked with such actors/comedians as Stephen Fry, Ben Elton, and Eddie Izzard. "They set me in motion, giving me the drive I needed to move forward. Soon it became apparent that I would need to move to London in order to truly focus on this as a career," Scott remembers.

== Career ==
Scott began his career working in the music industry, and later started acting in community theatre.

After only a few weeks in London, Scott was spotted by the Storm Model Management agency in London, home to Kate Moss, Elle Macpherson, and other prominent models. Modelling allowed him to earn enough money to put himself through college. He studied for two years at the London Academy of Music and Dramatic Art (LAMDA).

I didn't always want to be an actor but I always knew I would be. Just a feeling that has lived within me from my earliest childhood memories.

— James Scott

As time went on, he began to model for clothing companies. During a modelling trip to Los Angeles, he went to an acting class at the Ivana Chubbuck studio in Hollywood. The class inspired him to save money and make the move to Los Angeles. He studied acting for two more years before being cast on All My Children. Scott originated the role of Ethan Cambias in August 2004 and played it until February 2006. He then moved on to Days of Our Lives where he took on the role of EJ DiMera in May 2006.

On 2 May 2014 it was announced that Scott would be leaving Days of Our Lives to pursue other endeavours.

On 27 September 2015, he reprised his role as EJ DiMera of Days of Our Lives on Last Week Tonight with John Oliver, reuniting with Alison Sweeney (as Sami Brady) in honour of Nujeen Mustafa and the Syrian refugee crises.

Scott retired from acting and started a life-coaching business called The Whisper Within.

== Personal life ==
During an interview in April 2014, Scott described a spiritual experience he had in Peru during a trip to the country, from which he had just returned prior to the interview – and during which he took Ayahuasca with the guidance of Native Peruvian shamans. During the interview, Scott described the experience as "the single most positive experience of my life" and further stated of the experience that "it sounds wacky when you say it, but it was truly the most important thing I have ever done. I came back a very different person."

== Filmography ==
Year	Title	Role	Notes
2004–2006	All My Children	Ethan Cambias	Contract role
2006–2014	Days of Our Lives	EJ DiMera	
2007–2008	Days of Our Lives	Santo DiMera	
2016	Wrecked	Liam	TBS, Pilot only

== Awards and nominations ==
List of acting awards and nominations
Year	Award	Category	Title	Result	Ref.
2010	Daytime Emmy Award	Outstanding Lead Actor in a Drama Series	Days of Our Lives	Nominated	
2011	Daytime Emmy Award	Outstanding Lead Actor in a Drama Series	Days of Our Lives	Nominated	
