= List of Days of Our Lives characters introduced in the 1970s =

A list of notable characters from the NBC soap opera Days of Our Lives that significantly impacted storylines and debuted between January 1, 1970, and the end of 1979, in order of first appearance.

== Jeffrey Jones ==
Jeffrey Jones
- Days of Our Lives character
- Portrayed by: Graham Brown
- Duration: 1970
- First appearance: May 5, 1970
- Last appearance: July 27, 1970
- Created by: William J. Bell
- Introduced by: Betty Corday
In-universe information
- Occupation: Criminal
- Wife: Gracie Jones
- Children: Howard Jones; Elaine Jones; Mary Jane Jones; Lionel Jones

Jeffrey "Jeff" Jones was character that briefly appeared on Days of Our Lives from May to July of 1970. His family is considered the first African-American family to appear on daytime television and the first African-American family on the show before the Grant and Carver families respectively.

Jeff is introduced when Bill Horton is working in prison infirmary while serving his sentence for suspicion of murder. He discovers that Jeff has terminal lung cancer and doesn't have long to live. Wanting to make things right with his family, especially his estranged son Howard, Jeff is tempted by another inmate, Ribiwitz (Sid Conrad), to steal pills and sell them from the prison. He hopes to use his profits to help his son Howard through college. Bill becomes suspicious when Jeff's wife Gracie (Maidie Norman) receives a $500 "contribution" from the inmates. Working along with Dr. Eric Richards (John Aniston), the drug ring is stopped. Jeff continues to see Bill from time to time and spend what time his has with his family.

Jeff and his family were dropped from the canvas by July and never mentioned again.

== Linda Patterson ==
Linda Patterson
- Days of Our Lives character
- Portrayed by: Nadyne Turney (1970); Margaret Mason (1970–1982); Elaine Princi (1984–1985)
- Duration: 1970–1971; 1975–1980; 1982; 1984–1985
- First appearance: July 14, 1970
- Last appearance: November 29, 1985
- Created by: William J. Bell
- Introduced by: Betty Corday
In-universe information
- Occupation: Legal secretary Former executive assistant at Anderson Manufacturing; Former CEO of Anderson Manufacturing
- Parents: Cliff Patterson; Claire Patterson
- Husband: Jim Philips (1971–1975); Bob Anderson (1978–1980)
- Children: Melissa Horton
- Grandchildren: Nathan Horton

Linda Patterson was a character portrayed by Nadyne Turney in 1970 before being replaced by Margaret Mason until her departure in 1982. Elaine Princi portrayed the character from 1984-1985. Linda was Mickey Horton's secretary.

== Greg Peters ==
Greg Peters
- Days of Our Lives character
- Portrayed by: Peter Brown
- Duration: 1971–79
- First appearance: April 16, 1971
- Last appearance: September 21, 1979
- Created by: William J. Bell
- Introduced by: Betty Corday
In-universe information
- Occupation: Doctor
- Father: Phil Peters
- Mother: Anne Peters
- Brothers: Eric Peters
- Spouse: Susan Martin (1973–76); Amanda Howard (1976–79)
- Nieces: Annie Peters

Dr. Greg Peters was portrayed by Peter Brown from 1971 to 1979.

Greg worked with Susan Hunter Martin at the David Martin Clinic and the two became engaged and were married. By 1974, their marriage began to dissolve, and he became involved with Amanda Howard, a patient at Neil Curtis' private practice. He and Susan divorced and devoted more time to Amanda and helped her with her brain tumor surgery before marrying her. In 1979 Greg got a better job offer in Chicago and he and Amanda left Salem though they would divorce shortly after.

== Don Craig ==
Don Craig
- Days of Our Lives character
- Portrayed by: Jed Allan
- Duration: 1971–85
- First appearance: June 21, 1971
- Last appearance: April 17, 1985
- Created by: William J. Bell
- Introduced by: Betty Corday
In-universe information
- Occupation: Lawyer; District Attorney
- Parents: Amelia Craig
- Siblings: Paolo Craig; Angela Craig
- Spouse: Barbara Craig; Marlena Evans (1979–81); Liz Chandler (1981)
- Children: Donna Temple Craig; Betsy Craig; D.J. Craig

Don Craig was portrayed by Jed Allan from 1971 until 1985.

Don came to Salem as a successful and wealthy attorney. After fourteen years, he went to the mail to post a letter and hasn't been seen since. This fact was referred to by Anna DiMera on the March 4, 2022, episode, when Sarah Horton, believing herself to be Renée DuMonde, mentions wanting to hire Craig as a lawyer.

== Kim Douglas ==
Kim Douglas
- Days of Our Lives character
- Portrayed by: Helen Funai
- Duration: 1971–1972, 1976–1977
- First appearance: June 24, 1971
- Last appearance: March 21, 1977
- Created by: William J. Bell
- Introduced by: Betty Corday (1971); H. Wesley Kenney (1976)
In-universe information
- Husband: Doug Williams (until 1972)

Kim Douglas was portrayed by Helen Funai in 52 episodes of Days of Our Lives from 1971–1972 and from 1976–1977. Kim's introduction, as portrayed by the Japanese-American actress Funai, also marks the first appearance of an AAPI actor on the serial.

Kim, a beautiful Pacific Islander, was once married to Doug Williams when he was still known by his legal name of Brent Douglas. Kim follows Doug to Salem, where he found himself involved with both Julie and Julie's mother Addie, and threatens to make her presence known. Instead, Doug forces a reluctant Kim to sign their divorce papers, effectively ending their marriage. Kim returns to Chicago where the two once shared a life, even though Kim's presence is still noticed and commented on by Addie.

In 1976, Kim returns to Salem, this time dropping in on Doug at his house attached to Doug's Place. She tells Doug that she has fallen on hard times and needs a place to stay. This enrages Julie, who had only just gotten close to him again after years of false starts and crossed signals. Kim is employed by Doug at Doug's Place as the new hostess. On the night Doug and Julie's engagement is to be announced, Kim stuns the crowd at the club by wearing a Chinese-inspired dress with a long slit up the leg. Just as the engagement is announced, Kim whispers to Doug that their marriage is still valid, meaning he can't marry Julie.

Doug is furious at this news, but his mood calms slightly when he learns that because they are still married, he will stand to inherit an island in the Pacific Ocean, as Kim's family is allegedly related to Polynesian royalty. However, after meeting with Don Craig, the two of them determine that there is no island to be inherited, and most likely the revelation that Kim told Doug about their divorce not truly being final was also a lie. Doug is determined to get to the bottom of the divorce drama by going to Chicago himself. When he boards the plane, he is joined shortly afterward by his seatmate, none other than Kim. Kim confesses to Doug that their divorce from years ago is indeed valid and he is free to marry Julie.

Julie, receiving some mixed signals of her own, decides to take Don Craig up on his offers of dating and romance to make Doug jealous. Likewise, Doug sees Julie with Don and asks Kim to come back from Chicago so they can rekindle their relationship. When Don and Julie announce their engagement, Doug and Kim announce their own competing engagement, going as far as to book their weddings on the same day and to have Trish Clayton be the main entertainment at both weddings at different points in the day. However, Doug suffers a horrific car crash before his wedding to Kim, and Julie rushes to his side. Don and Kim both realize Doug and Julie are made for each other, and on the day of the dueling weddings, the first and only wedding, namely Doug and Julie's, goes off without a hitch. Kim, realizing Doug is lost to her forever, leaves Salem and returns to Chicago.

== Eric Peters ==
Eric Peters
- Days of Our Lives character
- Portrayed by: John Lombardo (1971); Stanley Kamel (1972–76)
- Duration: 1971–1976
- First appearance: July 22, 1971
- Last appearance: May 10, 1976
- Created by: William J. Bell
- Introduced by: Betty Corday
In-universe information
- Occupation: Writer
- Father: Phil Peters
- Mother: Anne Peters
- Brothers: Greg Peters
- Daughters: Annie Peters

Eric Peters was portrayed by John Lombardo from July 22 to August 23 of 1971 and by Stanley Kamel from January 26, 1972, to May 10, 1976.

Eric Peters was Greg Peters' brother who had a sexual encounter with his wife, Susan Martin, that she initially took as rape due to believing it was her dead husband David. This resulted in the birth of their daughter Annie. When Greg found out about the supposed rape from Eric's new book, he angrily attacked and hospitalized Eric. Susan apologized to him and in the years to follow, Eric saw more of his daughter and he and Susan developed real feelings for each other. After Greg divorced Susan, Eric and Susan left for California with their daughter.

== Mary Anderson ==
Mary Anderson
- Days of Our Lives character
- Portrayed by: Brigid Bazlen (1972); Karin Wolfe (1972–75); Nancy Stephens (1975); Carla Borelli (1975); Barbara Stanger (1976–80); Susan Keller (1980); Melinda Fee (1981–82)
- Duration: 1972–82
- First appearance: March 29, 1972
- Created by: William J. Bell
- Introduced by: Betty Corday
In-universe information
- Occupation: Businesswoman; CEO of Anderson Manufacturing
- Family: Anderson Family
- Father: Bob Anderson
- Mother: Phyllis Anderson
- Half-brothers: Robert Anderson, Jr. Nathan Curtis
- Half-sisters: Brooke Hamilton
- Husband: Alex Marshall (1980)

Mary Anderson was portrayed by many actresses including Nancy Stephens, later known for her role in the Halloween movies, Barbara Stanger played the role the longest from 1976 to 1980. Actress Melinda Fee was the last character to play the role from 1981 until the character was killed by the Salem Strangler in 1982.

== Bob Anderson ==
Bob Anderson
- Days of Our Lives character
- Portrayed by: Mark Tapscott (1972–80); Dick Gitting (1978)
- Duration: 1972–80
- First appearance: July 18, 1972
- Last appearance: March 28, 1980
- Created by: William J. Bell
- Introduced by: Betty Corday
In-universe information
- Occupation: Businessman
- Spouse: Phyllis Anderson (?–1974); Julie Olson (1974–76); Linda Patterson (1978–80)
- Children: Brooke Hamilton; Mary Anderson; Robert Anderson Jr.

Bob Anderson was played by Mark Tapscott from July 18, 1972, to March 28, 1980. Between May 26 to July 27, 1978, he was briefly replaced by Dick Gitting. Bob and his wife Phyllis came to Salem in 1972. After Scott Banning was given a job at his company, he died in an accident. The couple took his widow Julie Olson in their home and Bob fell in love with her. He divorced Phyllis and married Julie. In 1976 also that marriage fell apart.

Bob eventually learned that Brooke Hamilton had stolen some checks from his company and he was her father. His old flame Adele Winston confirmed it before she died. Bob gave Brooke a job at his company, and she then paid back what she had stolen.

In 1978, he married Linda Patterson but divorced her as well in 1980 due to her infidelities and attempts to take over his company. He had heart problems and Phyllis came back to Salem to take care of him. They rekindled their relationship and became engaged. Before they could remarry Bob died of a heart attack. In his will, he left part of his estate to Melissa Anderson, Linda's daughter by Jim Phillips, whom he had adopted.

== Phyllis Anderson ==
Phyllis Anderson
- Days of Our Lives character
- Portrayed by: Nancy Wickwire (1972-1973); Corinne Conley (1973-1977; 1980; 1982); Elizabeth MacRae (1977)
- Duration: 1972–82
- First appearance: July 18, 1972
- Last appearance: April 15, 1982
- Created by: William J. Bell
- Introduced by: Betty Corday
In-universe information
- Occupation: Businesswoman; Part-owner of Anderson Manufacturing
- Spouse: Bob Anderson (?–1974); Neil Curtis
- Children: Mary Anderson; Nathan Curtis

Phyllis Anderson was portrayed by Nancy Wickwire before she left due to failing health. Her replacement Corinne Conley prominently had the role for the longest period until her final departure in 1982.

After Julie Olsen moved in with her and Bob, Phyllis began noticing he was taking more of his attention away from her to Julie. After their divorce, she marries Neil Curtis. He attempted to swindle her out of money to feed his gambling addiction but she made him sign a prenuptial agreement before they got married. Their marriage proved to be rocky as Neil cheated on her with Amanda Howard. Neil and Phyllis eventually divorced and she left Salem.

== Robert LeClair ==
Robert LeClair
- Days of Our Lives character
- Portrayed by: Robert Clary
- Duration: 1972–73, 1975-1983, 1986-87
- First appearance: August 28, 1972
- Last appearance: June 17, 1987
- Created by: William J. Bell
- Introduced by: Betty Corday
In-universe information
- Spouse: Rebecca North (divorced)
- Children: Dougie LeClair (legal son)
- Other relatives: Eli Jacobs (brother); Robin Jacobs (niece); Jeremy Horton (grand-nephew)

Robert LeClair was a character on Days of Our Lives portrayed by Robert Clary from August 28, 1972 – January 11, 1973; June 13, 1975 – March 14, 1980; December 4, 1981 – March 1, 1983; and January 29, 1986 – June 17, 1987.

A close friend of Doug's and would often perform at with his friend at Doug's Place. He also served as Doug’s best man at his and Julie’s 1976 wedding. He was infatuated with Rebecca North, Doug's housekeeper, and when she’s pregnant and abandoned at the altar by her boyfriend Johnny, he steps in to marry her and accept the child as his own. He learns from Linda Patterson-Phillips that she was artificially inseminated which eases his doubts of Rebecca being unfaithful and legally adopts Dougie as his own and makes Doug and Julie his godparents.

Despite his attempts to make Rebecca love him, her heart belonged to Johnny Collins and agrees to a divorce with the two sharing custody of Dougie. However, when Rebecca wants to move Japan with Johnny, Robert fights for full custody for Dougie but loses in court and reluctantly lets her take his son with the promise that she visit once year. He regains custody of Dougie in February 1979 after Rebecca dies in a plane crash. A safety deposit box is discovered with a letter to Doug revealing that his is the biological father of Dougie. Doug kept it to himself while setting up a trust for Dougie until Robert reveals his intentions to move to Paris with his sister because he felt Dougie would need a maternal influence. At that point, Dougie was renamed Charles. Doug reveals the truth Christmas of that year. With this revelation, Robert decides to stay In Salem and let Doug be a part of his son’s life under the condition that he never tell Dougie the truth. The next year however, Robert moves to Paris anyway with Dougie who eventually went to a Swiss boarding school.

He returned to Salem for Doug's help after he gets in trouble with the DiMeras after stealing money from them after laundering it for them. He helps get info on Stefano and clears his fears but leaves Salem again. In 1986, he returned and revealed his not only a Holocaust survivor, but Robin Jacobs' uncle, Mike Horton’s then love interest. When a former Nazi war criminal, Dr. Fredrich Kluger, under the guise of “Fred Miller” arrives at Salem University Hospital, he sets out to proves as the man was responsible for his mother’s death. Robert is shot by Fred in a confrontation but survives and Fred is arrested. The incident and reconnecting Robin and her father inspires him to speak about his Holocaust experience on a lecture tour.

In December 2024, Doug Williams III confirms that Robert had been dead for awhile.

== Amanda Howard ==
Amanda Howard was portrayed by Mary Frann from April 3, 1974, to September 21, 1979.

She was a patient of Dr. Greg Peter's who was guilt stricken and depressed over the fact she had had an affair with Dr. Neil Curtis. Neil would propose to her and on the night they were to marry, Amanda found Neil with a prostitute and tried to commit suicide. The attempt failed, but it brought her closer to Greg.

In 1976, Amanda learned she had a brain tumor and would be dead in six months if she did not undergo surgery and was afraid to have the surgery because her mother had died while having the same operation. With Neil and Greg's encouragement, she had the surgery and survived, though she lost her memory for a short time, and married Greg.

In 1979, Amanda and her husband Greg left Salem after Greg got a better paying job in Chicago. She returned to Salem, however, after her and Greg split and moved in with Chris Kositchek. When Amanda learned she was pregnant, Chris proposed to her and she went to Chicago to divorce Greg, who refused thinking the baby was his. However, Amanda learned her pregnancy was a tubal one, and she lost the baby and was forced to undergo a hysterectomy. Greg quickly divorced Amanda, and a depressed Amanda broke off her relationship with Chris and left town.

== Trish Clayton ==
Trish Clayton
- Days of Our Lives character
- Portrayed by: Patty Weaver
- Duration: 1974–1982
- First appearance: August 23, 1974
- Last appearance: August 10, 1982
- Created by: William J. Bell
- Introduced by: Betty Corday
In-universe information
- Occupation: Singer; Bar Manager
- Father: Jim Stanhope
- Mother: Jeri Clayton
- Siblings: Virginia Stanhope (half-sister)
- Spouse: David Banning (1977-1981)
- Children: Scotty Banning

Trish Clayton was portrayed by Patty Weaver from 1974 to 1982.

Trish came to Salem with her mother Jeri and stepfather Jack Clayton where and her mother were popular singers at Doug's Place. She learned that her real father was a man named Jim Stanhope who wanted nothing to do with her. She later has a one night stand with David Banning and becomes pregnant as a result. In 1977 Trish's stepfather began obsessing about her and attacked her. Mike Horton came to her aid and in the scuffle, Trish kills Jack with an iron, killing him. Traumatized, Trish develops multiple personalities but recovered with counseling and therapy. Later that year, David and her married and gave birth to their son, Scotty.

Her career and unpredictable nature often cause strife with marriage and her abilities as a mother. In 1979, she stole a fortune in gems from another singer. She asked Margo Anderman to hide the gems for her, only to return them after the singer came to Salem to retrieve his stolen gems. In 1981, David and Trish divorced and she later became the manager of the Twilight Bar. Trish soon became involved with a singer named Woody King and the two eventually left Salem.

== Rebecca North ==
Rebecca North
- Days of Our Lives character
- Portrayed by: Brooke Bundy
- Duration: 1975–1977
- First appearance: July 11, 1975
- Last appearance: August 5, 1977
- Created by: Pat Falken Smith
- Introduced by: Betty Corday
In-universe information
- Occupation: Housekeeper; Waitress
- Spouse: Robert LeClair (divorced)
- Children: Dougie LeClair

Rebecca North was a character in Days of Our Lives portrayed by Brooke Bundy from July 11, 1975 to August 5, 1977.

Introduced as Doug’s housekeeper and Hope's nanny, she learns of his desire to give Hope a sibling. She encourages him to uses artificial insemination. Unknown to Doug, however, Rebecca volunteers to carry his child. Rebecca went Dr. Neil Curtis, who was the head of the hospital’s surrogate program, and was impregnated for money that she sent to her boyfriend, Johnny Collins, in Paris where he was studying to be an artist. When it began to show, Rebecca claimed Johnny was the father. He leaves her after he learned the true nature of the pregnancy. Robert LeClair steps in to provide for her and they marry in 1976 before she gives birth to Dougie, named after his real father.

After Dougie's birth, Rebecca received a note from Johnny and it was clear she still loved him. As Rebecca and Robert divorce, Johnny struggles with being a family man and finding work. When he lands a job in Japan, she decides to leave Dougie with Robert and go with Johnny, taking Dougie with her. Two years after leaving Salem, she and Johnny died in a plane crash in Tokyo off-screen.

== Paul Grant ==
Paul Grant
- Days of Our Lives character
- Portrayed by: Lawrence Cook
- Duration: 1975–1976
- First appearance: October 30, 1975
- Last appearance: December 6, 1976
- Created by: Pat Falken Smith
- Introduced by: Betty Corday
In-universe information
- Occupation: Supervisor at Anderson Manufacturing
- Spouse: Helen Grant (until 1978)
- Children: Valerie Grant; Danny Grant
- Grandsons: Eli Grant

Paul Grant, portrayed by Lawrence Cook was introduced in October 1975 as the patriarch of the Grant family. Paul and his wife Helen (Ketty Lester) take in the injured stranger David Smith (Richard Guthrie) when their children Valerie (Tina Andrews) and Danny (Michael Dwight Smith) invite him into their home. When David starts drinking heavily, Paul informs him that he used to be a drunk and that it only makes things worse. Fearing the trouble he will cause, Helen wants David gone but Paul refuses to put David out in the street. They are shocked to discover David's obituary in the newspaper. Confronted by the Grants, David confesses he is hiding from his family fed up with his mother Julie Anderson's (Susan Seaforth Hayes) chaotic love life. Though he is hesitant, Paul feels obligated to tell David's family that he is ok but warns Julie to keep her distance because David is not interested in seeing her. David is furious when his girlfriend Brooke Hamilton (Adrienne LaRussa) shows up and Paul admits that he couldn't keep the secret knowing how Helen would feel if Danny had suddenly disappeared. Though David reconciles with his mother when she suffers a miscarriage, he remains at the Grant home. Feeling indebted to them, David offers to help Paul find a new job. Meanwhile, Paul is suspicious of David and Val's growing closes when he finds them dancing together. Later, Paul lands a job at Bob Anderson's (Mark Tapscott) plant and while the rest of the Grant household is ecstatic, David doesn't seem too happy about it. David confesses to Paul and his great-grandfather Tom Horton (Macdonald Carey) that Brooke claims she is pregnant with David's child. Tom and Paul appeal to Brooke to tell the truth but her story does not change. After a doctor visit confirms Brooke's pregnancy, David confides in Paul and a disappointed Val. Paul warns David that marrying Brooke won't matter if they aren't happy. In 1976, at his wife's request, Paul tries to get Brooke's alcoholic mother Adele Hamilton (Dee Carroll) to admit that she has a problem but she denies it. Paul warns Brooke that she also had to admit to herself that her mother has a problem. When Adele finally comes around, Paul accompanies her to an Alcoholics Anonymous meeting at the church. David gets a job at Anderson Manufacturing working under Paul. Brooke later confides in Paul that she hates that Bob (her father) sees her as a charity case. Instead Bob gives money to Adele and she buys more alcohol. Paul finds her, dumps the alcohol and takes the rest of the money to Brooke. Paul died off-screen of a heart attack at the plant in July 1978.

== Janice Barnes ==
Janice Barnes
- Days of Our Lives character
- Portrayed by: Martha Nix (1975–78); Elizabeth Storm (1987–88)
- Duration: 1975–78; 1987–88
- First appearance: December 18, 1975
- Last appearance: March 14, 1988
- Created by: Pat Falken Smith
- Introduced by: Betty Corday (1975); Betty Corday, Ken Corday and Al Rabin (1987)
In-universe information
- Occupation: Medical intern
- Family: Horton (foster)
- Mother: Joanna Barnes
- Adoptive parents: Mickey Horton (foster); Maggie Horton (foster)
- Sisters: Melissa Horton (foster); Sarah Horton (foster)
- Half-brothers: Daniel Jonas (foster)
- Half-sisters: Summer Townsend (foster)
- Grandfathers: Elmer Simmons (foster); Tom Horton (foster)
- Grandmothers: Dorothy Simmons (foster); Alice Horton (foster)
- Uncles: Tom Horton, Jr. (foster); Bill Horton (foster)
- Aunts: Marie Horton (foster); Addie Horton (foster)
- Nephews: Parker Jonas (foster)
- Nieces: Melanie Jonas (foster); Holly Jonas (foster); Mackenzie Horton (foster)
- First cousins: Julie Olson Williams (foster); Steve Olson (foster); Sandy Horton (foster); Mike Horton (foster); Jessica Blake Fallon (foster); Hope Williams Brady (foster); Lucas Horton (foster); Jennifer Horton (foster)

Janice Barnes is a fictional character on the NBC daytime soap opera, Days of Our Lives. The role was originated by future The Waltons actress Martha Nix on December 12, 1975, and departed the role on December 7, 1978. Nine years later the role was recast with Elizabeth Storm first airing on September 21, 1987, and departing on March 14, 1988.

Introduced as the foster daughter of Mickey and Maggie Horton (John Clarke and Suzanne Rogers). In May 1978, Janice's biological mother Joanna (Corinne Michaels) returned to Salem and secretly began seeing Janice without Mickey and Maggie's knowledge. Joanna kidnapped Janice during an unplanned trip to Disneyland. When the two were later found, Joanna stayed in Salem to stay closer to her daughter, driving Maggie to drink, thus beginning Maggie's long struggle with alcoholism. Due to Maggie's struggle, Joanna was later granted custody of Janice and the two later depart Salem. In September 1987, Janice returned to town when Maggie was recovering through a recurrence of Myasthenia Gravis. Janice stayed in town and took a job at Salem University Hospital where she had romances with both Bill Horton (Christopher Stone) and Mike Horton (Michael T. Weiss). She was murdered in 1988 by the Riverfront Knifer, making her his second victim.

== Samantha Evans ==
Samantha Evans
- Days of Our Lives character
- Portrayed by: Andrea Hall (1977–1982); Deidre Hall (1992, 2008)
- Duration: 1977–1980; 1982; 1992; 2008
- First appearance: July 15, 1977
- Last appearance: August 20, 2008
- Created by: Ann Marcus
- Introduced by: Betty Corday and H. Wesley Kenney (1977); Betty Corday and Al Rabin (1982); Ken Corday and Tom Langan (1992); Ken Corday and Edward J. Scott (2008)
In-universe information
- Other names: Marlena Evans
- Occupation: Actress
- Father: Frank Evans
- Mother: Martha Evans
- Sisters: Marlena Evans
- Uncles: Robert Evans
- Nephews: D.J. Craig; Eric Brady
- Nieces: Sami Brady; Belle Black
- First cousins: Trista Evans
- Other relatives: Will Horton; Johnny DiMera; Claire Brady; Allie Horton; Sydney DiMera; Grace Brady (legal); Arianna Horton; Mackenzie Horton

Samantha Evans was portrayed by Andrea Hall, the twin sister of fellow Days of Our Lives actress, Deidre Hall, who portrays Samantha's twin sister, Marlena. Samantha appeared from 1977 to 1980, with a brief reprisal in 1982, when the character was killed by the Salem Strangler. Marlena named her first daughter, Samantha, after her sister.

Deidre briefly portrayed Samantha in newly created flashbacks 1992 and 2008, respectively.

== Kate Winograd ==
Kate Winograd
- Days of Our Lives character
- Portrayed by: Elaine Princi
- Duration: 1977–1979
- First appearance: July 26, 1977
- Last appearance: May 8, 1979
- Created by: Ann Marcus
- Introduced by: Betty Corday and H. Wesley Kenney
In-universe information
- Occupation: Anesthesiologist

Dr. Kate Winograd, played by Elaine Princi, first appears in July 1977, when she is Head of Anesthesiology at Salem University Hospital. Kate befriends main character Dr. Bill Horton, and they fall for each other. Bill romances Kate, but she resists his advances. Kate departs Salem in February 1978, and returns in 1979, when she has a sexual affair with Dr. Neil Curtis.

Kate and Bill's friendship begins when Bill, an accomplished surgeon, retrains in Anesthesiology after losing the ability to do surgery, thanks to a gunshot injury to his arm which causes nerve damage and impairs the use of his right hand. Bill retrains as an anesthesiologist so he can carry on working in the Operating room, and Kate supervises his re-training.

Bill clashes with new Chief of Surgery, Dr. Walter Griffin, because Bill thinks Griffin does unnecessary surgeries on patients and is "knife-happy". Bill is assigned to the night shift by the Chief of Staff Greg Peters, to avoid clashes with Griffin. This puts strain on Bill's marriage with Dr. Laura Horton. Kate speaks up for Bill, saying the other trainees value him, and persuades Peters to put Bill back on the day shift.

Bill's brother's neighbor Fred Barton falls downstairs and hits his head, and Bill rushes him into hospital. Fred hemorrhages and needs emergency brain-surgery, but the only surgeon available is an inexperienced junior trainee. The trainee panics in the Operating Room, and walks out. Bill has to do the surgery himself and he saves the man's life, with Kate assisting. But after the operation Barton is paralyzed from the waist down, and he sues the hospital and Bill and Kate. The trainee surgeon covers himself by saying Bill threw him out of the Operating Room; and Kate and Bill are fired from the hospital.

Both unemployed, and both fighting the suit against them, Bill and Kate spend time with each other, and become close. They go for walks, and Bill kisses Kate at Christmas. At the same time, Laura's own work commitments have also put a strain on their marriage. Unhappy with his relationship with Kate, Laura throws Bill out, and he goes to live at the Salem Inn. Although Kate is in love with him, she also won't let Bill stay with her. She won't be the "other woman".

Bill's brother Mickey persuades the young trainee surgeon to come clean about what he did; and Dr Marlena Evans helps Fred Barton realize that his paralysis is actually psychological, stemming from childhood traumas. On the day of Bill and Kate's trial, Barton walks into court! The case is thrown out, and Bill and Kate are re-instated at the hospital. That evening Bill and Kate celebrate and share a passionate kiss. But Kate breaks it off, and forces Bill to leave.

Bill has a change of heart, and realizes his love for his wife Laura. He apologizes to Kate, telling her he mistook feelings of loyalty to her as love, and that he wants to remain friends and colleagues. Kate tells him she is leaving to take a job in Cleveland, but she really is heartbroken to miss her chance with the man she loves!

In January 1979, with his hand better, Bill is offered the post of Chief of Surgery, and he accepts. Kate is over her infatuation with Bill, and with Laura's blessing, he re-hires Kate as Head of Anesthesiology. Kate assures Bill and Laura that she and Bill are now just good friends. Kate and Bill work away together when they go help flood-victims out of town.

Laura's mentally-ill mother commits suicide, and Laura is traumatized. She begins to have hallucinations of her dead mother, who tells her to do things. Laura becomes paranoid, and she accuses Kate of moving in on Bill, telling her everyone at the hospital is talking about it. Kate tries to reassure Laura that she is just friends with Bill, to no avail. As Kate's reputation is very important to her, she resigns from the hospital again. Bill asks Kate to stay near by, but she gives him the cold shoulder. In truth, Kate is having an affair with Dr Neil Curtis, and her affair with Neil has just become sexual. Kate is resolved to leave town, as she does not want to cause the breakdown of marriages.

== Chris Kositchek ==
Chris Kositchek
- Days of Our Lives character
- Portrayed by: Josh Taylor
- Duration: 1977–87; 2022
- First appearance: August 5, 1977
- Last appearance: July 12, 2022
- Created by: Ann Marcus
- Introduced by: Betty Corday and H. Wesley Kenney
In-universe information
- Father: Stan Kositchek
- Siblings: Jake Kositchek; Amy Kositchek
- Wife: Savannah Wilder

Chris Kositchek is a character portrayed by Josh Taylor from 1977 to 1987.

He arrived in Salem and worked as a foreman for Anderson Manufacturing, and started seeing Mary Anderson. Phyllis Anderson tried to bribe Chris to stop seeing Mary, but he turned her down and continued to see Mary, even after learning she had an affair with Dr. Neil Curtis. He and Mary would eventually part ways.

He later became romantically involved with Amanda Howard after she moved in with him. Mary decided she wanted him back which to an argument that caused Chris to accidentally run her over with his car. When Amanda becomes pregnant, Chris proposes to her to help provide for her. However, she suffered a miscarriage and a depressed Amanda left town and broke off her engagement with Chris.

Chris continued to see other women while running his own gym called Body Connection and became good friends with the Bradys, Bo in particular. He became romantically involved with Savannah Wilder but broke it off with her after learning of her criminal activities with Victor Kiriakis. At some point he also left Salem for good.

In 2022, Josh Taylor returned to the role after nearly thirty-five years as a guest character in Days of Our Lives: Beyond Salem. It's revealed that he eventually rekindled his relationship with Savannah and they eventually married. They both run a gym in San Francisco where Paul Narita and Andrew Donovan investigate Harris Michaels.

== Larry Atwood ==
Larry Atwood was played by Fred Beir from August 11, 1977, to March 15, 1978.

Atwood opened a club called The Pines and took much of Doug's clientele from his own club. at Doug’s Place. He continued to make trouble for Doug when he planted cocaine in his dressing room and then raping Julie. Doug wanted to kill Atwood for what he had done to Julie but one of Doug's employees beat him to it.

== Margo Anderman ==
Margo Anderman was portrayed by Susanne Zenor from September 21, 1977, to May 21, 1980.

She met Mike Horton and two fall in love and were married, however, in 1978, Margo was diagnosed with leukemia. Although it went into remission, the medical bills from her treatments led her and Mike into financial problems. Desperate, they sought the help of loan shark, Earl Roscoe. When Mike fell behind on his payments to Earl and was threatened, Margo used some diamonds she received from Trish Clayton as collateral to appease Earl. By 1980, Earl had terrorized the couple and assaulted Margo. Mike's uncle, Mickey Horton, had them set at Maggie's farm in Brookville to get away from Earl until he left Salem.

Margo and Mike’s homecoming was marred by tragedy. Margo's leukemia had returned and she soon died. Mike took the loss of his wife hard, but it also inspired him to become a doctor like his grandfather, Tom Horton.

== Earl Roscoe ==
Earl Roscoe
- Days of our Lives character
- Portrayed by: Dan Priest (1978-79); Dan Barton (1979-1980)
- Duration: 1978–80
- First appearance: October 31, 1978
- Last appearance: February 12, 1980
- Created by: Ann Marcus
- Introduced by: Betty Corday and H. Wesley Kenney
In-universe information
- Occupation: Loan shark Drug/Porn Distributor

Earl Roscoe, also known as Earl Carnes, was a character introduced in Days of Our Lives in 1978. He was portrayed by Dan Priest from 1978 to 1979 and by Dan Barton from 1979 to 1980.

Earl initially caused trouble for Julie Williams when her brother Steve Olsen bought fake antiques and counterfeit art from him for her shop. Later, he was revealed to be a loan shark and porno ring leader who caused trouble for people in Salem, particular Mike Horton and later his wife Margo. A desperate Mike needing money to pay off his wife's medical bills sought Earl out for a loan. When Mike fell behind on payments, he began working for Earl to pay off his new debt. Margo attempted to pay off the debt with diamonds she was holding for her friend Trish Clayton, unaware that Trish stole them from Steve Olsen who was holding them for smuggler, Durand. When Margo saved enough money buy back the diamonds, Earl gave her fake diamonds instead.

Mike continued to sink deeper into debt, and when he refused to run drugs for him, Earl terrorized Margo. First, threatening to burning their house down, fired a shot into the house while Margo was inside, and later pushing Margo down a flight of stairs. Terrified, the couple fled Salem with Mickey Horton's help, setting them up at Maggie's old farm in Brookville until things with Earl were settled.

Later, Trish discovered the diamonds were fake and confronted Earl who gave her back the real ones. In 1980, Earl mailed a nude photo to Don Craig. His daughter, Donna, had refused to pose nude for him, he doctored the photo with her face. Realizing they were fake after seeing his daughter's portfolio, Don met with Earl to buy the rest of the photos and her screen test. Making too many enemies, Earl set fire to his office and fled Salem, never to be heard from again.

== Alex Marshall ==
Alex Marshall
- Days of our Lives character
- Portrayed by: Quinn Redeker
- Duration: 1979–87
- First appearance: July 25, 1979
- Last appearance: July 23, 1987
- Created by: Elizabeth Harrower
- Introduced by: Betty Corday and H. Wesley Kenney
In-universe information
- Occupation: Businessman
- Brothers: Harley Marshall
- Spouse: Mary Anderson (1980); Renée DuMonde (1983); Emma Donovan (1985–87)
- Daughters: Jessica Blake Fallon
- Grandsons: Nick Fallon

Alex Marshall was portrayed by Quinn Redeker from 1979 until 1987.

Alex came to Salem to work for Anderson Manufacturing. He is a charming conman who got away with many crimes. After he burned down the Salem Inn to collect insurance money, he went to prison.

== See also ==
- List of Days of Our Lives characters
- List of Days of Our Lives characters (1960s)
- List of Days of Our Lives characters (1980s)
- List of Days of Our Lives characters (1990s)
- List of Days of Our Lives characters (2000s)
- List of Days of Our Lives characters (2010s)
- List of Days of Our Lives characters (2020s)
- List of Days of Our Lives cast members
- List of previous Days of Our Lives cast members
