= Melissa Horton =

- Days of Our Lives character
- Lisa Trusel as Melissa Horton
- Portrayed by: Joseph Trent Everett (1971); Matthew Bowman (1971); Kim Durso (1975–1976); Debbie Lytton (1977–1982); Lisa Trusel (1983–1988, 1994–2010); Camilla Scott (1990–1991)
- Duration: 1971; 1975–1980; 1982–1988; 1990–1991; 1994; 1996; 2002; 2010
- First appearance: October 18, 1971
- Last appearance: June 28, 2010
- Created by: William J. Bell
- Introduced by: Betty Corday
In-universe information
- Other names: Melissa Phillips; Melissa Anderson
- Family: Horton (adoptive)
- Parents: Jim Phillips; Linda Anderson
- Adoptive parents: Mickey Horton; Maggie Horton
- Siblings: Janice Barnes (foster); Sarah Horton (adoptive); Daniel Jonas (adoptive); Summer Townsend (adoptive)
- Spouse: Pete Jannings (1985–87)
- Children: Nathan Horton
- Grandparents: Tom Horton (adoptive); Alice Horton (adoptive); Elmer Simmons (adoptive); Dorothy Simmons (adoptive)
- Aunts and uncles: Tom Horton, Jr. (adoptive); Bill Horton (adoptive); Marie Horton (adoptive); Addie Horton (adoptive)
- Nieces and nephews: Melanie Jonas (adoptive); Parker Jonas (adoptive); Holly Jonas (adoptive); Mackenzie Horton (adoptive); Victoria Kiriakis (adoptive)
- First cousins: Sandy Horton (adoptive); Hope Williams (adoptive); Julie Williams (adoptive); Steve Olson (adoptive); Mike Horton (adoptive); Jennifer Horton (adoptive); Lucas Roberts (adoptive); Jessica Blake (adoptive)

Melissa Horton is a fictional character from the NBC soap opera, Days of Our Lives.

== Casting ==
She was played by child actors Joseph Trent Everett from October 18 to November 29, 1971, Matthew Bowman from December 16 to 29, 1971, and Kim Durso from April 15, 1975, to June 25, 1976. A teenaged Melissa was portrayed by Debbie Lytton from May 31, 1977, to April 17, 1980, and March 16, 1982, to November 29, 1982. Lisa Trusel played an adult Melissa from May 12, 1983, to November 8, 1988, with returns from June 28 to July 4, 1994, November 1 to 15, 1996, May 30 to June 3, 2002; January 14 to 19, 2010, and June 18 to 28, 2010. Camilla Scott played the role from February 14, 1990, to June 13, 1991.

== Storylines ==
Melissa is the child of Jim and Linda Phillips; however, Linda claims that Mickey Horton is the father. Mickey's wife Laura reveals to Linda in private that he is sterile, a fact Mickey himself did not know. Laura had been keeping it from him so he wouldn't discover that he was not the father of her son Mike; Linda reluctantly admits that Jim is Melissa's father.

Melissa later takes the name Anderson following Linda's marriage to Bob Anderson. Melissa becomes a teenager (as a result of soap opera rapid aging syndrome (SORAS). She runs away from her private school, unable to deal with her trouble-making mother Linda, who wanted her back in order to get her hands on Anderson Manufacturing. Melissa ends up in Mickey and Maggie's home, having considered them surrogate parents for several years already. When Linda discovers her there, she tries to have her removed physically, and Mickey and Maggie decide to fight for custody of her. Linda does not show up for the hearing and the judge grants custody to the Hortons. Melissa and her cousin Hope Williams become good friends and Melissa also becomes good friends with Hope's boyfriend Bo Brady. In 1984, Melissa gets involved with gang member Pete Jannings. Melissa's relationship with Pete experiences various challenges, including Linda's attempts to sabotage it by pretending to have slept with him. Linda aims to make Melissa believe she is going crazy to gain control of Melissa's stock in Anderson Manufacturing. Despite Linda's failed scheme, she decides to leave town, offering a final apology that Melissa reluctantly accepts. Melissa and Pete marry, but their union ends in divorce when Melissa, an aspiring dancer, becomes romantically involved with her mentor, Lars Englund. Unfortunately, their relationship and Melissa's dance career unravel due to an injury.

Melissa eventually falls in love with Jack Deveraux but is heartbroken when he marries Kayla Brady instead. Melissa is eventually accused of being behind Kayla's poisoning but is cleared. Melissa stands by Jack after he commits marital rape against Kayla. Despite her family and friends' horror, she plans to marry Jack after his divorce from Kayla. However, before the wedding, Melissa catches Jack with another woman and learns he was using her for appearances. She calls off the wedding, denounces Jack to the rest of Salem, and leaves town.

Melissa returns two years later and immediately realizes that her cousin, Jennifer Horton, has fallen in love with Jack, who by this time is trying to become a better person. Melissa tries to discourage her cousin from getting involved with her former fiancé and encourages Jennifer's boyfriend Emilio to propose. However, Melissa and Emilio eventually realize they are attracted to one another and get together while Jack and Jennifer are away on the Cruise of Deception. Melissa and Emilio are free to be together after Jack and Jennifer return and reveal that they had become a couple on the cruise. The relationship is short-lived as Melissa accidentally believes to have killed Emilio in a struggle. Melissa eventually leaves Salem with her adoptive sister Sarah Horton, and the two settle in Nashville. In a subsequent visit to Salem, it is revealed Melissa is pregnant. In 1994, Melissa returns for Tom's funeral. In 2002, Melissa returns for the Christening of Hope's son, Zack Brady. In June 2009, Melissa's son, going by the name of Nathan Horton, arrives in Salem as a first-year medical intern at Salem University Hospital, eager to follow in the footsteps of his great-grandfather, Tom.

Melissa returns for Mickey's funeral, expressing gratitude for the opportunities Mickey and Maggie provided her. During the memorial, she reunites with her son Nathan and the Horton family. In 2010, she makes a brief appearance to bid farewell to Alice.

== Reception ==
Trusel's run as Melissa earned her various nominations, including a Daytime Emmy award nomination. Amanda Lynne from The List wrote that despite Melissa not having appeared in years, "longtime fans of the soap opera will likely remember Melissa and all of the drama surrounding her life".
