= Marie Horton =

Fictional character on Days of Our Lives

- Days of our Lives character
- Maree Cheatham as Marie Horton
- Portrayed by: Maree Cheatham (1965–1973, 1994–2025); Kate Woodville (1977); Lanna Saunders (1979–1985)
- Duration: 1965–1968; 1970–1971; 1973; 1977; 1979–1985; 1994; 1996; 2010; 2024–2025
- First appearance: November 8, 1965
- Last appearance: November 14, 2025
- Created by: Peggy Phillips; Kenneth Rosen
- Introduced by: Ted Corday (1965); Betty Corday (1970–1977); Ken Corday and Al Rabin (1979); Ken Corday and Tom Langan (1994, 1996); Ken Corday and Gary Tomlin (2010); Ken Corday and Janet Spellman-Drucker (2024)
In-universe information
- Occupation: Nurse; Nun; Medical missionary in Africa; Lab technician Graduate student at Salem University
- Parents: Tom Horton; Alice Horton
- Siblings: Tom Horton Jr.; Addie Horton; Mickey Horton; Bill Horton
- Husband: Craig Merrit (1966); Neil Curtis (1983)
- Daughters: Jessica Blake Fallon
- Grandsons: Nick Fallon
- Nieces and nephews: Sandy Horton; Julie Williams; Steve Olson; Hope Williams Brady; Melissa Horton (adoptive); Sarah Horton (legal); Mike Horton; Jennifer Horton; Lucas Horton

Marie Horton is a fictional character on the NBC soap opera, Days of Our Lives. Created and introduced by serial creator Ted Corday, actress Maree Cheatham is most-recognized in the role, originating it on the debut episode that first aired November 8, 1965. As of the November 14, 2025, episode, Cheatham is the last surviving original cast member to appear on the serial; returning for its 60th anniversary, beginning with its 15,000th episode. The youngest child of Tom and Alice Horton, she is the mother of Jessica Blake Fallon and grandmother of Nick Fallon.

== Casting ==
The role of Marie was originated by Maree Cheatham on the debut episode of Days of our Lives November 8, 1965, who played the role on-contract through August 23, 1968, again from January 29, 1970, through May 3, 1971, and briefly on December 22 and 23, 1971, and from May 9 through October 25, 1973. Cheatham reappeared in the role on June 28 and 29, 1994, November 1 to 15, 1996, and briefly from June 11 to 28, 2010. In Cheatham's absence, actress Kate Woodville played Marie from May 13, 1977, to December 7, 1977, and actress Lanna Saunders played the role on-contract from April 9, 1979, through April 8, 1985.

In April 2024, following the death of Bill Hayes, it was announced Cheatham would reprise the role in episodes pertaining to the death of Hayes' Doug Williams, as well as the celebration of the soap's 15,000th episode. Marie returned during the December 2 episode. Discussing her return, Cheatham told TV Insider: "It's such an honor to be called back for this very auspicious and emotional [occasion]. DAYS has to be congratulated for lasting this long and going into the future with streaming. This is the future of television!" In August 2025, it was announced she would again reprise the role in celebration of the serial's 60th anniversary later the same year. She returned during the November 10 episode, and departed during the November 14 episode.

== Storylines ==
Marie Horton is the youngest child of Tom and Alice Horton. When the show begins in 1965, Marie is a biochemistry graduate student at Salem University. She has recently broken her engagement to a wealthy man named Rick Butler and is now engaged to Tony Merritt, her neighbor. Marie's sister Addie disapproves of Marie's engagement to Tony, as Tony is "merely" a teacher, while Rick is wealthy like Addie's husband, Ben Olson. Marie and Tony plan to wed on Thanksgiving 1965, but Tony calls it off the night before. Marie grows depressed and attempts suicide, but Tony's father Craig consoles her. Marie marries Craig in 1966 and becomes pregnant by him. Soon she suffers a miscarriage and falls into another deep depression, which he cannot lift. She begins hallucinating, imagining she hears babies crying. Her miscarriage even makes her doubt her belief in God, but she eventually resumes attending church regularly. Craig then finds out why Tony dumped Marie: he had been diagnosed with a rare blood disease and did not want her to watch him die. But now Tony has fully recovered. Realizing that Tony still loves Marie, Craig divorces her to let her be with Tony. But Marie has changed. She distrusts Tony, and they break up in 1967. Tony leaves Salem.

Marie starts work at Salem University Hospital as a lab technician assisting Dr. Mark Brooks, a newcomer to Salem. Soon they fall in love and begin dating. But Tom and Alice notice striking similarities between Dr. Brooks and their dead son, Tommy. Marie's brother Mickey and Tom investigate and find proof that Dr. Brooks is Tommy. Tommy was a POW in the Korean War and presumed dead, but he saved a Soviet soldier's life and has been given a reconstructed face in return. Marie is devastated that she has been dating her own brother.

Marie leaves Salem to become a medical missionary in Africa but returns when her brother Bill kills Tommy's ex-wife Kitty. She eventually moves to New York, where she becomes involved with Alex Marshall and his brother Haley. She has a fling with Alex and bears his child, whom she gives up for adoption so that she can join a convent. In 1977, now a nun, she returns for a visit.

In 1979, Marie returns home and runs into Alex. Seeing him brings back traumatic memories of drugs, sadomasochistic behavior, the pregnancy, and the death of Harley, so Marie is happy to be called back to the convent. She leaves it again in 1980 to look for their child, Angelique Horton, whom she discovers has been living as Jessica Blake. Jessica gets a position as a student nurse at Salem University Hospital, with Alex as her sponsor. Although neither he nor Jessica know that he is her father, he develops paternal affection for her. He and Marie fight over her, but Marie doesn't tell him Jessica is his daughter. Soon Alex legally adopts Jessica, and Marie reveals the truth about her to Alex. Alex wants more information, so he and Marie travel to Canada to visit the orphanage where Jessica was placed. But their plane crashes. Finding refuge in a mountain cabin, they rekindle their romance.

Later that year, Alex tells Jessica he is her father. She grows closer to Alex but hates Marie for having given her up. Alex and Marie plan to wed, so Marie goes to Montreal to resign from the convent. But the wedding is postponed when Jessica runs off to join a convent herself. Marie later works things out with her.

Marie's relationship with Alex is threatened by his jealous ex-wife Mary Anderson. Mary deceitfully convinces Marie that Alex is having an affair, so Marie leaves Alex. They later reconcile and plan to elope. As Marie waits for him, Alex is shot. He is paralyzed from the waist down and does not remember who shot him. Marie moves in with him to care for him but postpones their wedding.

More problems come for Marie and Alex as Jessica develops multiple personalities (Jessica, Angel, and Angelique). When Jessica's cousin Hope discovers the condition, she informs Marie, who promptly flies to LA to stop Jessica from marrying Jake Kositchek, who turns out to be the local serial killer, the Salem Strangler. Jessica has a mental breakdown, and Marie helps her recover. Alex and Marie part ways in 1982, never getting married as they have planned.

Marie then starts dating a man named Neil Curtis, who has been rejected by a woman named Liz Chandler. He and Marie marry a few months later. Liz hates Marie for marrying him, and Marie resents Liz because Neil still loves Liz. Liz sneaks into Neil and Marie's apartment and sleeps with Neil. Later that day, Neil has to go to the hospital and leaves Liz at the apartment. When Marie returns home, Liz mistakes her for a burglar and shoots her. Marie soon recovers, but Liz is sentenced to five years in prison. Neil and Marie divorce in 1983. Marie leaves town in 1985.

Marie returns home to visit in June 1994 for her father's funeral; in 1996 for her niece Hope's wedding; offscreen in January 2010 for her brother Mickey's funeral; and in June 2010 when she hears that her mother Alice is extremely ill. Marie reminisces with her niece Julie and Mickey's widow Maggie about the wonderful times she shared with Alice. Several days later, Marie hears from Bill that Alice has died in her sleep. Before leaving Salem, Marie thanks Maggie for hosting her and promises to return soon.

On August 31, 2012, Marie writes a letter to the Parole Board for her grandson, Nick Fallon. She is unable to attend the hearing but her daughter, Jessica, keeps her updated on the latest happenings. In January 2013, her sister-in-law, Maggie, mentions that Marie and Jessica are unable to attend Nick's wedding but that she will take plenty of pictures and send them to Marie. In December 2024, Marie returns for Doug's funeral. The following year, she returns for the opening of the Tim Horton Free Clinic.
