= Laura Horton =

- Days of Our Lives character
- Jaime Lyn Bauer as Laura Horton (2021)
- Portrayed by: Floy Dean (1966); Susan Flannery (1966–1975); Susan Oliver (1975–1976); Rosemary Forsyth (1976–1980); Jaime Lyn Bauer (1993–2021); Cady McClain (2021)
- Duration: 1966–1980; 1993–1999; 2003; 2010; 2013; 2016; 2018; 2021
- First appearance: June 30, 1966
- Last appearance: February 10, 2021
- Created by: Peggy Phillips
- Introduced by: Ted Corday (1966); Ken Corday and Tom Langan (1993); Ken Corday and Albert Alarr (2021)
In-universe information
- Other names: Laura Spencer; Monica (at the Meadows)
- Occupation: Psychiatrist
- Family: Horton
- Parents: James Spencer; Carrie Spencer
- Husband: Mickey Horton (1967–1974); Bill Horton (1974–1993)
- Children: Mike Horton; Jennifer Horton
- Grandchildren: Jeremy Horton; Abigail Deveraux; JJ Deveraux
- Other relatives: Thomas DiMera; Charlotte DiMera

Laura Horton is a fictional character from the NBC soap opera, Days of Our Lives, a long-running serial drama about working class life in the fictional, United States town of Salem. Created by writer Peggy Phillips, Laura's storylines focus on family troubles. She is a member of the series' Horton family. Laura's marriage to Mickey Horton was a big part of the characters' history. She was also married to his brother, Bill. Many of Laura's storylines have also revolved around her mental health issues. Laura was initially portrayed by Floy Dean from June to October 1966, before Susan Flannery stepped in, portraying Laura from November 1966 to May 1975. Susan Oliver then portrayed Laura from October 1975 to June 1976, followed by Rosemary Forsyth from August 1976 to March 1980. The character then took a hiatus until 1993, when the role was recast with Jaime Lyn Bauer, who played Laura from November 1993 to July 1999. Bauer returned as Laura for brief stints in 2003, 2010, 2013, 2016, 2018 and 2021. Cady McClain also briefly portrayed the role in flashbacks in February 2021.

== Casting ==
The faces of Laura Horton

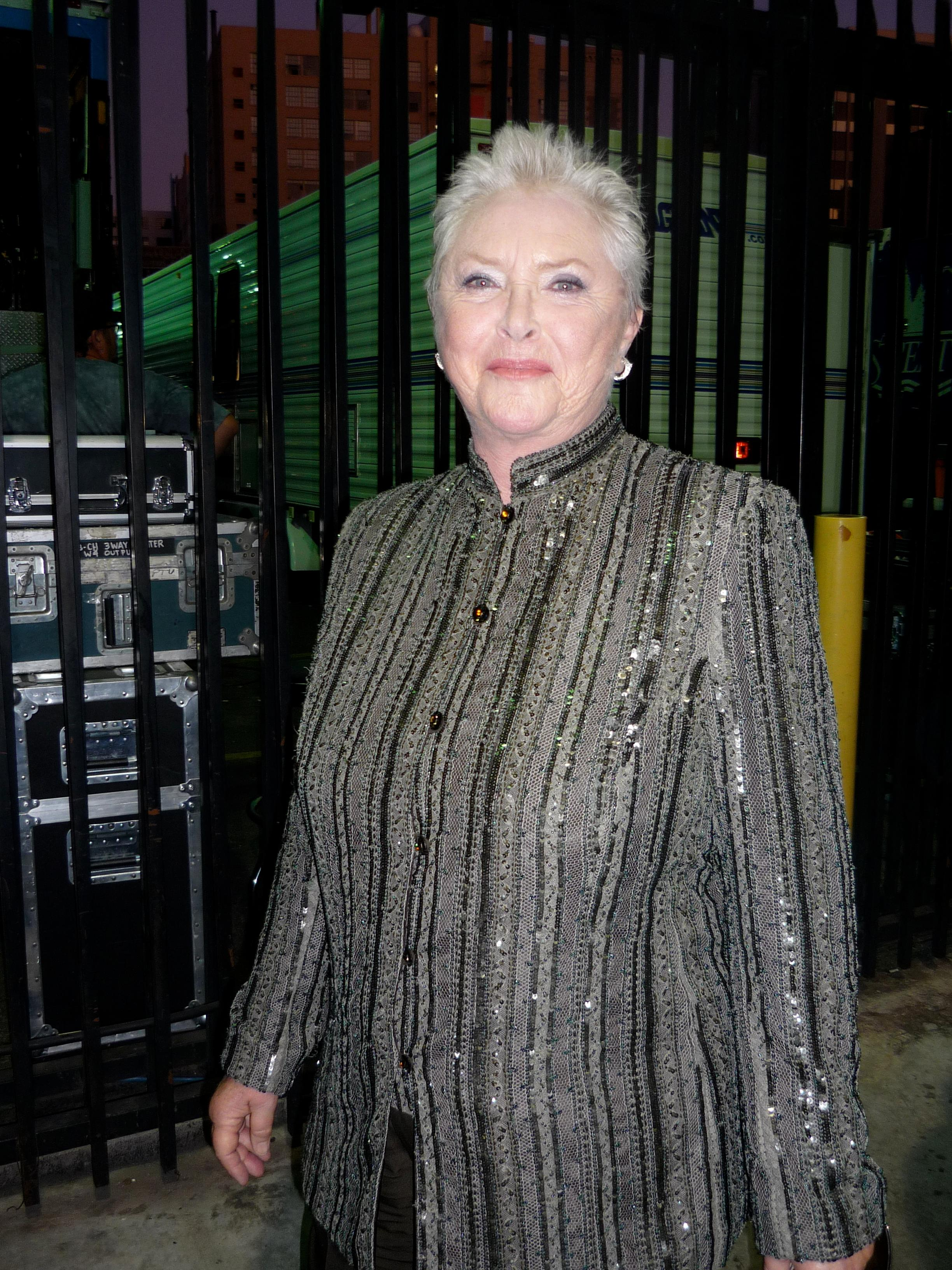
Susan Flannery portrayed the role from 1966 to 1975.

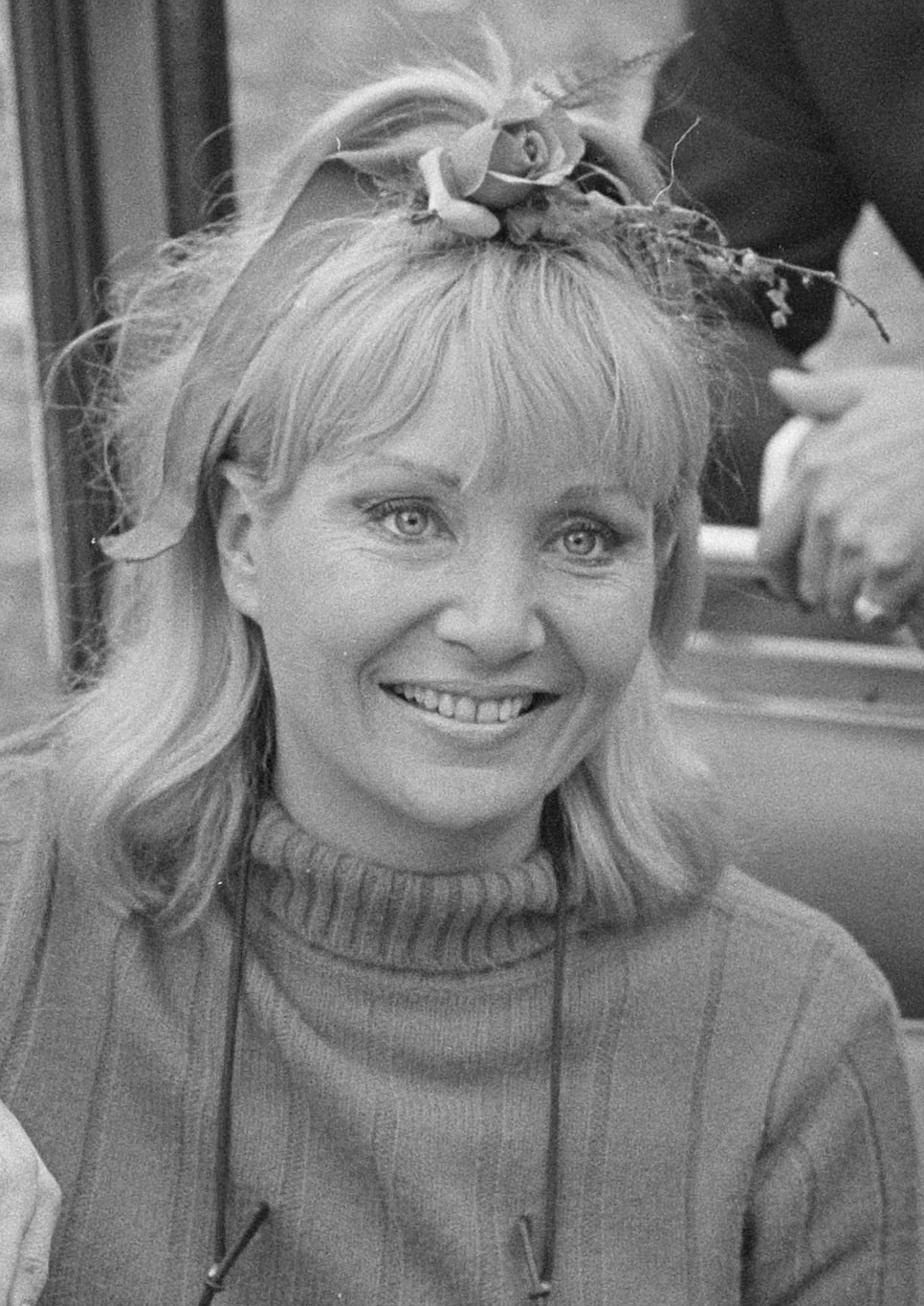
Susan Oliver succeeded Flannery in the role on Laura, from 1975 to 1976.

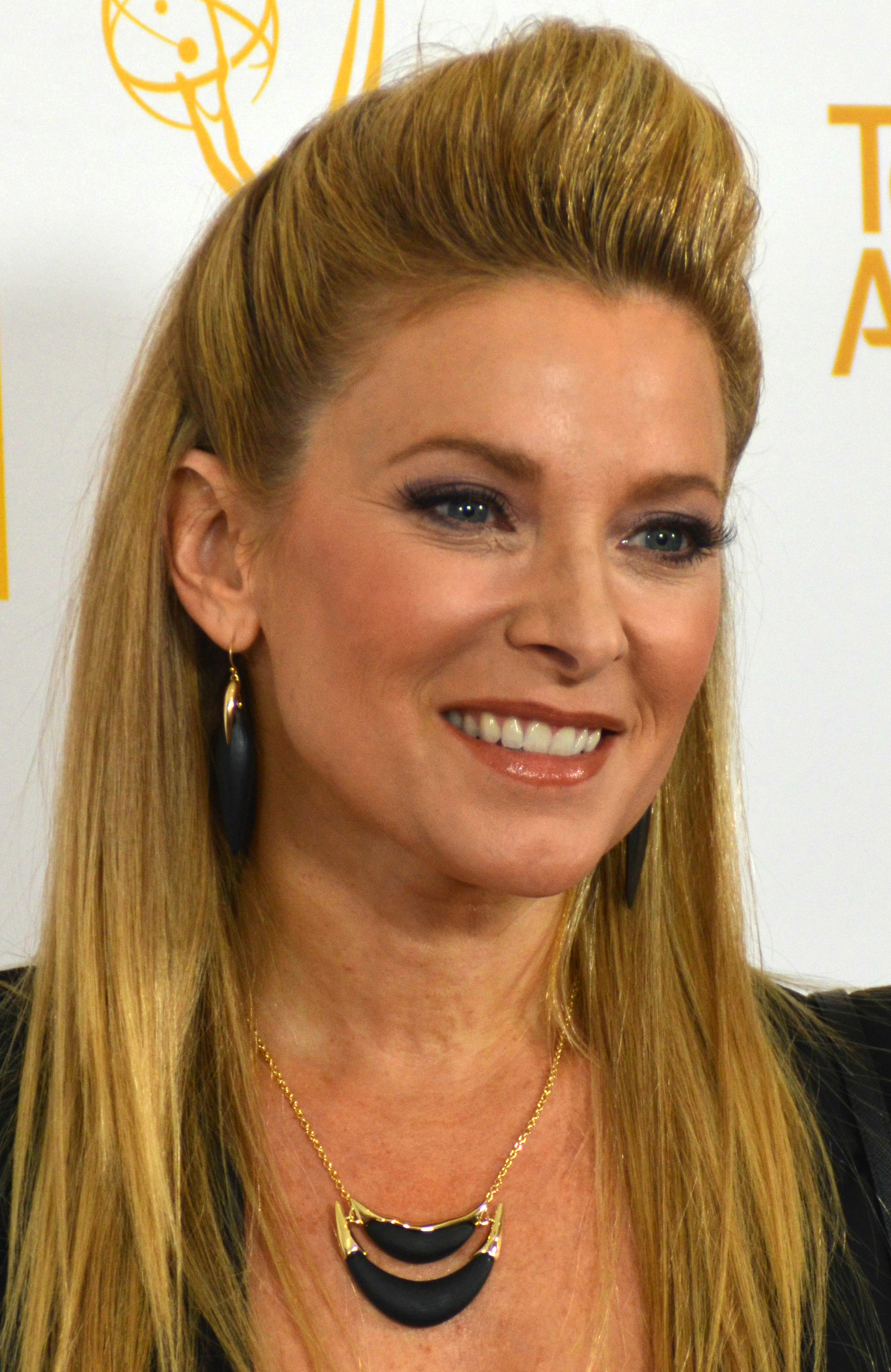
Cady McClain portrayed the role in newly-created flashbacks in February 2021.

The role was originated by actress Floy Dean from June 30, 1966, to October 21, 1966. Susan Flannery stepped into the role from November 22, 1966, to May 27, 1975. Flannery wore the same pair of shoes for her entire duration on the soap due to the soap's lack of wardrobe, and when she exited in 1975 she took one shoe and gave the other one to the co-creator, Betty Corday. Susan Oliver briefly stepped into the role from October 10, 1975, to June 9, 1976, followed by Rosemary Forsyth from August 24, 1976, to March 25, 1980. Jaime Lyn Bauer assumed the role on November 12, 1993.

Bauer departed as Laura in the episode originally broadcast on July 7, 1999, but she returned on May 26 and 27, 2003, for her daughter, Jennifer Horton's, wedding to Jack Deveraux and again from June 15 to 28, 2010, and April 10 and 11, 2013. In March 2016, it was revealed that Bauer would be returning to the show for at least three episodes airing in September. Bauer returned on September 2. She last appeared on December 1 of that year. She also returned briefly on May 30, 2018, for one episode. In February 2021, Baur returned to the role for a limited-guest run. The same month, Cady McClain briefly portrayed the role in newly created flashbacks. Bauer exited on February 10, after the character was killed off.

== Storylines ==
Laura Spencer arrives in Salem as a young psychiatric intern at the Salem University Hospital. She immediately catches the eye of Bill Horton, and the two become engaged. Bill calls off the wedding when he learns he can't be a surgeon, due to tuberculosis in his hand. Laura briefly dates Marie Horton's ex fiancé, Tony Merrit, however nothing serious develops between the two. Laura is in love with both Bill and Tony. Tony, however, recovers his relationship with Marie and, to cope, Laura dives deep into her work.

In 1967, Laura is assigned to evaluate Susan Martin's state of mind for the courts when Susan stands trial for killing her husband, David. In the process, Laura spends many hours with lawyer, Mickey Horton. They fall in love and marry in December 1967. In early 1968, jealous Bill gets drunk and rapes Laura. The following day, Bill is unable to remember raping Laura. Soon after, Laura learns she is pregnant and, when her father in law, Tom Horton, discovers a paternity test, things become more complicated. Tom learns that Mickey is sterile and that the baby is Bill's. Laura gives birth prematurely to a healthy baby boy named, Mike.

In 1970, Laura and Mickey's marriage begins to fall apart and they separate for a time, but eventually work things out by the end of the year. However, by 1971, Mickey and Laura again have troubles after his affair with Linda Patterson is made public. Laura and Mickey agree to remain married and try to make things work for Mike's sake.

In 1972, Bill and Laura begin to fall in love when Laura learns the true reason Bill went to jail. Laura plans to divorce Mickey and marry Bill but, when the two were overheard talking by Mike, he assumes they were having an affair, running out into the street and being hit by a car. Mike survives, and Laura realizes she cannot abandon her husband and child.

In 1973, Mickey has a heart attack after Mike lashes out at him for the pain he caused Laura by having an affair with his secretary. Mickey is rushed to surgery and survives the operation performed by Bill. Though he survives the operation, Mickey suffers a stroke which erases his memory. Mickey sneaks out of the hospital and leaves Salem. With Mickey out of the way, Laura is free to love Bill, however, her marriage to Mickey is still an obstacle for Mickey cannot be declared legally dead for seven years. Fate intervenes and, when Mickey is discovered to be alive, he grants Laura a divorce so he can remain with Maggie Simmons.

On December 4, 1975, Bill and Laura are married. Two months later, on February 6, 1976, Laura gives birth to their daughter, Jennifer Horton. However, Laura falls into a deep depression, but seems to overcome it with the help of Dr Marlena Evans. In 1977, Laura's marriage goes through a rocky period, when her husband Bill has a dalliance with his co-worker, Dr Kate Winograd. In early 1978, Bill repents of his affair, and he and Laura work at rebuilding their marriage. In 1979, Laura's mother Carrie, who has a mental illness and is being cared for in a psychiatric hospital, kills herself – after Laura has been putting off going to see her. Laura is traumatized by her mother's death and is overwhelmed by guilt at not visiting her mother. She becomes paranoid and begins to have hallucinations of her mother. Her "mother" tells her that Bill and Kate Winograd have resumed their affair, but it is not the case. Laura's mental illness worsens, and the vision of her mother instructs Laura to join her, by killing herself too. Laura hangs herself at home. Bill finds her in the nick of time, and saves her life. Bill realizes the extent of her mental illness, and that she needs full-time psychiatric care, and Laura is admitted to the care of Lakewood Sanitarium. They don't know at the time, but Laura is to spend over a decade institutionalized.

In 1993, when new character Kate Roberts is introduced on Days of Our Lives, the story of Laura's institutionalization is partially retconned. It is revealed that prior to Laura hanging herself, she discovered that Bill was having an affair with their tenant Kate Roberts, and that Kate was carrying Bill's child – and it was this that sent Laura off the edge and precipitated her mental breakdown.

In 1993, Kate Roberts begins to pay Laura visits at Pine Haven Sanitarium, where Laura has been transferred. Laura is very aware of what is going on around her, but remains in an apparent catatonic state because the crooked sanitarium workers are keeping her drugged in order to milk the Horton family of money. When Vivian Alamain is sent to the same sanitarium Laura is in, Vivian takes an interest in her. Laura realizes that Vivian is her ticket out. Laura is released and slowly regains her life as she knew it.

During the mid to late 1990s, Laura was mostly known for her close friendship with Marlena, and her dislike for Marlena's rival Kristen Blake. During John and Kristen's relationship, Laura tried several times to convince John and Marlena that they belonged together, despite the fact that John was in a relationship with Kristen. In late 1996, Peter Blake is shot by Jack Deveraux, and Jack is then arrested for Peter's murder. However, Laura discovers that Peter is alive after seeing him in town, and Laura is then kidnapped by Stefano DiMera. Stefano then performs laser surgery on Laura's brain in order to erase her short-term memory. The surgery seems to have worked, however, Laura slowly begins to get her memories back and then convinces Marlena that Peter is in fact alive. Laura then, with the help of Marlena and Mike, begin to try and figure out where Peter is in order to exonerate Jack for Peter's murder. After discovering that Peter is alive, Laura, Mike, and Marlena also discover that it was Stefano and Kristen who kept Peter's whereabouts a secret. Then in 1997, Marlena is kidnapped by Kristen and held captive in a "secret room". Laura discovers this, after overhearing Kristen communicate with her via a two-way radio, and tries desperately to convince John, Abe, Mike, and Jennifer that Marlena is being held captive by Kristen in the DiMera mansion. After John, Mike, and Abe attempt numerous searches in and around the DiMera house, they are convinced that Laura's schizophrenia is returning. Jennifer, along with her brother Mike, try to convince Laura to seek treatment, but Laura is adamant that there's nothing wrong with her and that Kristen and Stefano are in fact keeping Marlena captive inside the DiMera mansion. Soon after, Kristen gets herself locked in the same "secret room" that Marlena's in by Susan Banks, who had also discovered that Kristen had kidnapped Marlena. Susan, who now has seeming fallen madly in love with John as well, decides not to release Marlena from the secret room, but rather to keep her in there with Kristen. Susan then goes about pretending to be Kristen in order to marry John. On the day of John and Kristen's wedding, Laura snaps and decides to confront and attack Kristen (Not knowing that it is actually Susan). Whilst attacking "Kristen", Susan's false teeth falls out and lands in Vivian's martini, the truth is revealed and everyone, including Laura, realize that it's Susan pretending to be Kristen. Susan then tells John the truth about where Marlena and Kristen are, and John goes down to the cellar (to the secret room) and rescues both Marlena and Kristen. After being rescued, Kristen is adamant that the wedding should continue immediately, but is stopped by Marelna and Laura who expose all of Kristen lies in front of all of the wedding guests. In 1998, Laura is accused of murdering Kristen. But it was later revealed that the body was actually Susan Banks' sister Penelope Kent, and the killer was Susan's husband Edmund Crumb. Laura was then exonerated for the murder, however, her friendship with Marlena is in trouble because Marlena did not believe that Laura was innocent. After some time, Laura and Marlena reconcile, and their friendship is restored.

Laura returns in 2003 for the wedding of her daughter and again in June 2010, along with her ex-husband, Bill Horton, after receiving news that Alice Horton was extremely ill. Along with many other family members, she was reunited with her daughter, Jennifer, and reminisced about the wonderful times they shared with Alice. Laura was not happy when she caught Bill talking to Kate at the Horton house, which showed she was still not over their past together. Bill reminded Laura that Alice didn't judge and would have welcomed Kate's visit. Several days later, she received news from Maggie Horton that Alice died in her sleep. In April 2013, Jennifer goes to visit Laura after having relationship problems in Salem.

In 2016, Abigail Deveraux develops signs of schizophrenia and begins seeing visions of Ben. Laura, with the help of Andre DiMera manage to fake Abigail's death in order to help her get through her schizophrenia. Laura, who previously had schizophrenia is well experienced with treating the condition, helps Abigail overcome her mental setback and agrees not to tell anyone that Abigail is alive (the only other person besides Laura and Andre who knew Abigail was alive, was her mother Jennifer - it was later revealed that Laura had informed Jennifer that Abigail is alive).

== Reception ==
In 2020, Charlie Mason from Soaps She Knows placed Laura 13th on their list of the 35 most memorable characters from Days of Our Lives, commenting "Let's sorta blow past the 1990s version of the character that was originated by Susan Flannery and focus instead on her harrowing heyday, during which she was torn between good brother Mickey and bad seed Bill… who, and this can't be overstated, freakin' raped her." Amanda Lynne from The List wrote that "some fans were stunned" when Laura died in 2021 due to "Laura's longtime presence in Salem", adding that "Laura's death was particularly sad because of her heartbreaking life".
