= Elaine Princi =

American actress

- Years active: 1969–1999

Elaine Princi is a contemporary American actress. She played roles on several soap operas, including Dr. Dorian Lord on the ABC daytime soap opera One Life to Live from January 12, 1990, to February 18, 1993.

== Career ==
From 1977 to 1978 Princi appeared on NBC daytime soap opera Days of Our Lives, as Dr. Kate Winograd, Head of Anesthesiology at Salem University Hospital, where she befriends, and almost has an affair with, one of the show's core characters, Dr Bill Horton. She reprised the role of Kate for a brief stint in 1979.

From March 1981 to March 1983, Princi starred on CBS soap opera As the World Turns as Miranda Marlowe, and she remained on recurring status until December 1983. The role required that Princi speak with a French accent. Originally the apparent mastermind behind a crime ring in Oakdale, the character was reformed when she married Bob Hughes, a marriage that ended simply because Miranda became bored with Bob's provincial life that was a total contrast to her jet-setting past.

In August 1984, Princi returned to Days of our Lives, this time playing the role of Linda Patterson, a role previously played for many years by the blonde Margaret Mason who at the time was appearing on The Young and the Restless. Originally seen hiding behind a black veil, Princi's Linda disguised her identity by utilizing a French accent. The highlight of Princi's stint was when Linda pretended to be involved with her daughter Melissa's boyfriend, Pete Jennings, a dancer at a club which Linda secretly owned. She left the role in November 1985 after receiving a Soap Opera Digest nomination for Best Villainess.

In 1987, Princi appeared on ABC soap opera All My Children in the brief role of Eva, a madame.

In February 1990, Princi took over the role of Dr. Dorian Lord from Robin Strasser on ABC's One Life to Live, playing her until February 18, 1993, when Strasser returned to the role.

In 1992, Princi was the first actress playing Dorian to take the character over to ABC's companion soap All My Children, where Dorian conspired with Adam Chandler against his ex-wife Natalie Hunter. Princi was nominated for a Soap Opera Digest Award for "Outstanding Villainess: Daytime" in 1992 for her portrayal of Dorian Lord.

During the last years of Another World, Princi guest-starred as a judge in several unrelated trial storylines.
