= Mickey Horton =

Character on the soap opera Days of our Lives

- Days of our Lives character
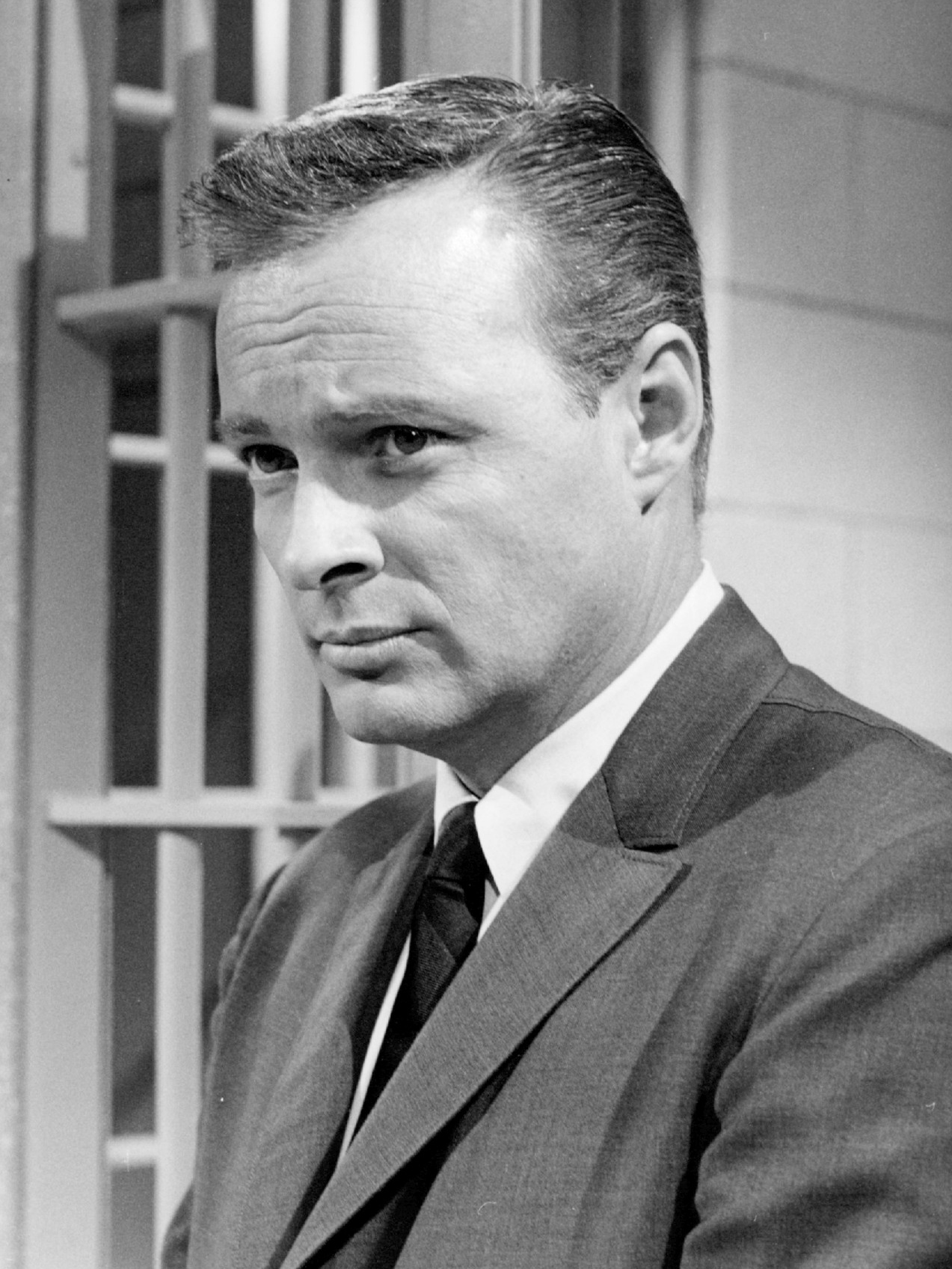
- John Clarke as Mickey Horton, 1967
- Portrayed by: John Clarke (1965–2004); Richard Voigts (2004); John Ingle (2004–06); Kevin Dobson (2008)
- Duration: 1965–2006; 2008
- First appearance: November 8, 1965
- Last appearance: October 2, 2008
- Created by: Peggy Phillips and Kenneth Rosen
- Introduced by: Ted Corday
In-universe information
- Occupation: Lawyer; Owner and Senior Attorney at Mickey Horton's Law Firm; Serves on the Board of Directors at Salem University Hospital
- Family: Horton
- Parents: Tom Horton; Alice Horton
- Siblings: Tommy Horton Jr. Addie Williams; Bill Horton; Marie Horton
- Spouse: Laura Spencer (1967–74); Maggie Horton (1974–84, 1986–2010) (Note: Mickey and Maggie first married in January 1974; however the marriage was invalid because he was still legally married to Laura. Laura and Mickey divorced in October 1974, and Mickey and Maggie were remarried that same month. Their divorce was finalized in January 1984.); Bonnie Lockhart (2004)
- Children: Melissa Horton (adoptive); Sarah Horton (legal); Janice Barnes (foster)
- Grandchildren: Nathan Horton (adoptive); Mackenzie Horton (legal); Victoria Horton-Cook (legal)
- Grandparents: Sid Grayson; Abigail Grayson; William Horton; Adelaide Horton
- Nieces and nephews: Sandy Horton; Steven Olson; Julie Williams; Hope Williams Brady; Mike Horton; Jennifer Horton; Jessica Blake; Lucas Roberts

Mickey Horton is a fictional character from the soap opera Days of Our Lives, played from the show's debut episode in 1965 until January 2004 by John Clarke, spanning 3,500 episodes. The role was briefly played in 2004 by Richard Voigts, then by John Ingle from 2004 through 2006. Kevin Dobson appeared as Mickey in the character's final appearances between April and October 2008.

At the time of his retirement, Clarke was the longest-tenured original Days of our Lives actor after his onscreen mother Frances Reid (Alice Horton), appearing in the role for 39 years. He was nominated for a Daytime Emmy Award in 1979 for Lead Actor in a Drama Series for his portrayal of Mickey.

== Storylines ==
Mickey was the middle son of Tom and Alice Horton and had four siblings: Tommy, Addie, Marie and, possibly his biggest rival, Bill. In the first episode in 1965, Mickey was introduced as a lawyer in Salem. His father Tom found out that Addie's daughter Julie and a friend stole mink from a department store. Wary that there might be legal repercussions, Tom and Mickey went to the police station to talk to the chief of police and Julie.

In 1965, Mickey started a relationship with Diane Hunter, whose divorce case Mickey was handling, and helped her to deal with her teenage daughter Susan. Diane and her husband later reconciled, mainly because of Susan. After many long nights working together, Mickey had his sights set on court psychiatrist Laura Spencer. She was initially engaged to Mickey's brother Bill, but she and Mickey got together after Bill called off the wedding and left town. After the David Martin murder case, they grew closer and became engaged. They married the following year.

Mickey took a sterility test, revealing that he was unable to have children; he forgot to review the results in the face of Laura announcing her pregnancy. He was unaware that his brother Bill was the father and that he had raped Laura in a drunken rage. Tom saw Mickey's test results and confronted Laura, who lied and said she and Bill consensually had sex. They agreed to keep the secret to protect the family. Michael William Horton was born in November 1968, with Mickey still believing he was the biological father.

In 1970, Mickey had an affair with his secretary Linda Patterson. After he refused to leave Laura for her, Linda attempted suicide; news of the affair spread quickly in Salem. Mickey and Laura decided to stay together for the sake of their son. Linda learned she was pregnant with what she thought was Mickey's baby, but was later revealed to be an ex-boyfriend's. Mike learned about Mickey's affair in 1973 and confronted his father, who suffered a heart attack.

John Clarke and Suzanne Rogers as Mickey and Maggie Horton

Mickey's brother Bill, a surgeon, performed a life-saving operation. Not long after, Mickey suffered a stroke and developed amnesia. He left Salem and adopted the name Marty Hanson. Maggie Simmons, a paralyzed farm girl, took him in and they fell in love, marrying in January 1974. Later, after Mickey's picture appeared in the paper, he was reunited with his family despite Maggie's best efforts. Bill offered to operate on Mickey in an attempt to restore his memory, but Mickey refused. Bill later performed a surgery to help Maggie walk again but it did not work. Laura had started a relationship with Bill after Mickey's disappearance; she and Mickey decided to divorce. Mickey and Maggie remarried in October 1974 after they realized their first marriage was invalid due to Mickey's marriage to Laura.

In 1976, Mike had an accident on Maggie's farm that required a blood donation. Neither of his parents were a match, leading Mickey to the conclusion that he was not Mike's biological father. This was confirmed when he found that his brother was a match. Mickey's memory returned. He went to Linda to ask if Melissa was his and she said no. In a fit of rage at being lied to for years, Mickey bought a gun and plotted to kill his brother. The two fought over the gun and it went off, shooting Bill in the arm. Mickey suffered a mental breakdown in the aftermath and was sent to the Bayview Sanitarium for a year.

Following his release from Bayview, Mickey and Maggie adopted their foster daughter Janice. Janice was kidnapped by her biological mother Joanna in 1978 but was found and returned to the Horton household. Maggie began drinking and she and Mickey lost custody of Janice to Joanna the following year. In 1981, Maggie agreed to be a surrogate mother for an anonymous donor and was inseminated by Dr. Neil Curtis. She tested pregnant shortly after. Mickey discovered that the anonymous donor was Evan Whyland but Maggie wanted to keep the baby regardless. Sarah Horton was born later that year; Mickey and Maggie were awarded custody over Evan. They also wound up with custody of Melissa after Linda failed to appear in court.

Mickey was kidnapped by Stefano DiMera after Mickey discovered that Stefano was blackmailing Evan and that Stefano caused Maggie's car accident. In 1983, Mickey escaped the DiMera island and arrived back in Salem to find that Maggie, believing Mickey was dead, was in a relationship with attorney Don Craig. The revelation gave Mickey a second heart attack, from which he eventually recovered. Mickey and Maggie divorced but Maggie quickly realized she was still in love with Mickey. She left Salem for New York for a year and returned in 1985, having missed Linda's plot to steal Anderson Manufacturing stock from Melissa under the guise of repairing their relationship. Mickey was shot and convalesced at Maggie's house. They remarried in 1986.

In 1988, Mickey ran for Senate. His rival was Jack Deveraux, who was dating Melissa. Jack proposed but Melissa learned he was using her and broke up with him. Meanwhile, Maggie and Mickey's relationship had become strained due to the long hours Mickey worked. Maggie had an affair with Neil Curtis, the doctor who inseminated her. Sarah caught them having sex and threatened to tell Mickey; Maggie and Neil then revealed that Neil was Sarah's biological father, not Evan. Despite this, Sarah still told Mickey, who blamed himself for the affair. Mickey and Maggie eventually repaired their relationship and Neil left town.

In 2003, the Salem Stalker broke into the Horton home. Mickey was stabbed with a scalpel and Maggie was killed with a blow to the head from a wine bottle. After months of grieving, Mickey married Bonnie Lockhart. It was soon revealed that Maggie was still alive and had been kidnapped by the DiMera family and stranded on their island with other Salem Stalker victims. Upon her return, Mickey spent months unsure of whether he would stay with Maggie, whose "death" had nullified their marriage, or Bonnie, his current wife. He eventually decided to return to Maggie.

During the mid-2000s, Mickey was in Chicago covering several trials and was rarely seen in Salem. He appeared in the 2008 and 2009 Christmas episodes, watching movies and sitting in the kitchen with his mother. Before New Year's Eve in 2009, he called to tell Maggie he was unable to make it home to Salem; the two decided to spend more time together in 2010. They agreed to go on a cruise in January on Julie's recommendation.

=== Death ===
Mickey died from a heart attack while packing to go on a cruise with Maggie on January 8, 2010. Maggie found Mickey's body and came downstairs in shock after attempting CPR. Hope arrived at the house while Maggie was still in shock; she went upstairs to check on Mickey and called 911. The paramedics removed Mickey's body from the house. A week later, the family held a memorial service, where Mickey and Maggie were both celebrated. Melissa attended the service to comfort Maggie. In June, Mickey's mother died of natural causes. Maggie and Julie celebrated Alice's relationship with her son, Mickey.

=== Mickey's cases ===
Mickey was usually seen whenever a Salem character had legal problems and needed an attorney. Despite this, he had a reputation for never winning a case; many of his clients ended up in prison for crimes they didn't commit.

Mickey represented the defendant unless otherwise stated in the table below; his role in the cases are listed. He spent a few years as assistant district attorney in the late 1980s.

Year	Role	Defendant	Accused crime/case	Verdict	Sentence	Actual culprit	End result and other details
1966	Lawyer	Tom Horton	Negligence in death of Carl Sawyer	Case dismissed	N/A	N/A	Marie told the court that she had attempted to commit suicide and that thanks to Tom she was still alive. Because of Marie's testimony, it became clear to everyone that it had been impossible for Tom to visit Carl because he'd had an emergency happening in his own home. As a result, the case was dismissed.
1967	Lawyer	Susan Martin	Murder of David Martin	Acquitted on grounds of temporary insanity	N/A	Susan Martin	Mickey encouraged her to plead innocent by reason of insanity, but Susan pleaded guilty (by reason of insanity) instead. Then Susan escaped from prison, only to face Helen Martin, who was grief-stricken that her son was taken from her. Helen shot Susan in the chest. Susan survived but had a serious heart problem that Tom took care of later on.
1969	Lawyer	Bill Horton	Involuntary manslaughter of Kitty Horton	Guilty	Five years in prison	Bill Horton	Bill refused to say exactly why he had gone to see Kitty the night that she suffered a heart attack; (she had been blackmailing him with a taped conversation where Laura admitted that Michael was Bill's son. They lost the case as a result.
1976	Defendant and lawyer	Mickey Horton	Attempted murder of Bill Horton	Guilty	Sent to Bayview Sanatorium	Mickey Horton	Mickey defended himself at a sanity hearing following his attempt to kill his brother. He lost the case after Laura's testimony, which stated that Mickey was well enough to be treated at home rather than in a sanitarium. This was thrown out as it wasn't objective. Mickey lost control of his calm demeanor at that moment and tried to strangle Bill. As a result, he was sent to Bayview.
1978	Lawyer	Julie Williams	Murder of Larry Atwood	Case dismissed	N/A	Arlo Roberts	Julie entered an innocent plea but things went downhill when details of Julie's relationship with Larry and the rape came out. Had Arlo Roberts not confessed, they would have lost the case.
1981	Lawyer	David Banning	Attempted murder of Alex Marshall	Guilty	3 years in prison	Eames, a hitman who worked for Stuart Whyland	Not only did all the witnesses damage Mickey's case, but Alex Marshall woke up from his coma and said that David had shot him.
1987	Prosecutor (DA)	Kimberly Brady	Murder of Emma Marshall	Guilty		Gillian Forrester	Kimberly was represented by Chris Kositchek. Mickey and fellow DA Leslie Landman won and sent Kim to jail. However, Shane eventually helped trap Gillian, who really killed Emma, and she was put in prison.
1987	Prosecutor (DA)	Steve Johnson	Murder of Duke Johnson	Case dismissed	N/A	Adrienne Johnson	During the trial, Adrienne finally remembered that she had killed Duke in self-defense after he had beat and raped her.
1988	Lawyer	Melissa Anderson	Poisoning Kayla Deveraux	Charges dropped	N/A	Harper Deveraux	Harper poisoned Kayla because he felt Kayla had betrayed Jack by being with Steve. Kayla later had the charges dropped.
1989	Prosecutor	Sally Wales	Attempted robbery of Brady Fish Market	Guilty	10 years in prison	Sally Wales	Sally was a homeless teen who had held people at gunpoint at the Brady Fish Market so that she could be arrested and have her child in prison. Mickey was able to get the maximum penalty of 10 years in prison.
1989	Prosecutor	Cal Winters	attempted murder of Roman Brady	Case dismissed	N/A	Diana Colville	The case was dismissed when Diana remembered that she shot Roman.
1990	Lawyer	Kayla Brady	Murder of Marina Toscano	Guilty	10 years in prison	Isabella Toscano	The decision was later overturned when it was discovered that the real culprit was Isabella Toscano.
1990	Lawyer	Isabella Toscano	Murder of Marina Toscano	Innocent	N/A	Isabella Toscano	Isabella was found innocent after it was established that Isabella had acted in self-defense.
1990	Lawyer	Bo Brady	Being the Riverfront Raider	Guilty	One-year probation, 1,000 hours community service	Bo Brady (with help from Emmy Borden)	Mickey asked Carly Manning to testify on behalf of Bo. Emmy, who was madly in love with Bo, was asked to testify against him. While Emmy's testimony damaged Bo's case, Carly then took the stand and told the judge about Bo's personal circumstances at the time of his criminal activities: his wife Hope's death and their son Shawn-Douglas' accident. She also told the judge that everyone believed Bo to be a hero. After hearing this, the judge decided to let Bo off with a one-year probation and 1000 hours of community work.
1991	Plaintiff's lawyer	Lawrence Alamain	Rape of Jennifer Horton	Guilty	6 months in prison	Lawrence Alamain	Lawrence was represented by Gregory Marchand.
1992	Lawyer	Salem University Hospital	Wrongful death of Dean Lombard	Hospital not responsible	N/A	N/A	Mickey won the case by establishing that Dean had a preexisting medical condition that ultimately caused his death.
1994	Lawyer	Billie Reed	Murder of Curtis Reed	Case dismissed	N/A	Stefano DiMera	Mickey almost lost the case, but just as the judge was about to pass sentence, Bo Brady jumped in and helped Billie remember that Stefano had killed her father, Curtis. The case against Billie was dismissed.
1995-96	Lawyer	John Black	Murder of Tony DiMera	Guilty	Tony DiMera (suicide)	N/A	John was in the gas chamber when Jack and Jennifer came in with evidence to save him. Years later, it was discovered that André DiMera, while pretending to be his cousin Tony, was actually the one who died by suicide via gunshot.
1998	Lawyer	Jack Deveraux	Murder of Peter Blake	Guilty	Life in prison	Peter wasn't really dead	Jack was sentenced to life in prison but escaped with Jennifer's help. After staging Jennifer's "death," they were able to prove that Peter was still alive.
1998-99	Lawyer	Sami Brady	Murder of Franco Kelly	Guilty	Death sentence	Lucas Roberts	Lucas murdered Franco, who was attempting to murder his mother, Kate. To protect her son, Kate framed Sami; to save Sami, she had Franco's dying friend Roberto Barelli confess to the killing on his deathbed, freeing Sami and letting Lucas off the hook.
1998-99	Lawyer	Sami Brady	Custody battle over Will Roberts	Lucas granted custody	N/A	N/A	
Unknown	Lawyer	Mike Horton	Sexual harassment of Ali McIntyre			N/A	Craig Wesley, Mike's rival, convinced Ali that if she pursued a relationship with Mike, Mike would make her head nurse. This turned out to be untrue but the two had already had sex, which led Ali to filing a sexual harassment suit against Mike. The hospital board investigated this incident.
2002	Lawyer	Bo and Hope Brady	Custody of J.T.	Glen Reiber was granted custody	N/A	N/A	J.T. and Zack Brady were switched at birth by Stefano DiMera.
2003	Lawyer	Shawn-Douglas Brady	Murder of Colin Murphy			Nicole Walker	Shawn D. believed he shot Colin but was incorrect.
2004	Tony DiMera	Murder of Roman Brady	Case dismissed	N/A	N/A	Marlena Evans	

== Reception ==
Charlie Mason from Soaps She Knows called Mickey the "good brother" in comparison to Bill. Clarke was nominated for a Daytime Emmy Award in 1979 for Lead Actor in a Drama Series for his portrayal of Mickey.
