= Lisa Trusel =

American actress

- Occupation: Actress
- Years active: 1981–present
- Spouse: David Wallace (m. 1986)
- Children: 4

Lisa Trusel is an American actress. She is best known for her Emmy nominated role as Melissa Horton on the NBC soap opera Days of Our Lives.

== Personal life ==
Trusel married her former Days co-star, David Wallace, on November 1, 1986. They have four children: Ryan Elizabeth (born December 1989), Benjamin (born c. 1991), Emma (born c. 1993), and Joseph (born c. 1997). As of 2015, they have three grandchildren.

== Career ==
She was a young member of the cast of the hit television show Father Murphy during the early 1980s, playing the character Lizette Winkler. She later became a regular character on the daytime television soap opera, Days of Our Lives, playing the character Melissa Phillips Anderson Horton for which she was Emmy nominated Outstanding Younger Actress in a Drama Series in 1985.

== Filmography ==
- 1981 - 1983: Father Murphy as Lizette Winkler (31 episodes)
- 1983: The Rousters as Darlene
- 1983 - 1988: Days of Our Lives as Melissa Horton (Role since: 1982 - 1988, 1994, 1996, 1997, 2002, January 2010, June 17, 2010)
- 1989: TV 101 as Jamie Myers (4 episodes)
