= Elizabeth Storm =

American actress

Elizabeth Storm (born Elizabeth Jennifer Storm on November 29, 1958) is an American actress. She is an actress, known for Desperate Housewives (2004).

== Career ==
Storm is known for portraying Katherine Barrett on the soap opera Passions from 2000 to 2003. She also appeared as Hollis Costillo on the soap opera Santa Barbara in 1989 and Janice Barnes in Days of Our Lives from 1987 to 1988. Storm later portrayed Janie Peterson on the primetime soap opera Desperate Housewives. She has also guest starred in numerous television series, including CSI: Crime Scene Investigation, Six Feet Under, Without a Trace, The King of Queens, and Matlock.

== Filmography ==
=== Film ===
Year	Title	Role	Notes
2002	Out of These Rooms	Betty	

=== Television ===
Year	Title	Role	Notes
1985	Highway to Heaven	Lane Kensington	2 episodes
1985	CBS Schoolbreak Special	Diane	Episode: "The War Between the Classes"
1987–1988	Days of Our Lives	Janice Barnes	40 episodes
1989	Matlock	Secretary	Episode: "The Starlet"
1989	Santa Barbara	Hollis Castillo	10 episodes
1990	Shannon's Deal	Polly	Episode: "Custody"
1991	Silk Stalkings	Linda Kirkland	Episode: "In the Name of Love"
1991	Civil Wars	Carolyn Martin	Episode: "A Long, Fat Frontal Presentation"
1993	Bodies of Evidence	Joanne Cole	Episode: "Whispers of the Dead"
1993	SeaQuest DSV	Claire	Episode: "Bad Water"
1994	Alien Nation: Dark Horizon	Slave Mother	Television film
1998	Maggie	Reporter	Episode: "Ballad of Maggie Day"
1998	Party of Five	Woman / Mother	Episode: "Tender Age"
1999	The King of Queens	Marion Douglas	Episode: "Hungry Man"
2000	The Geena Davis Show	Nicole	Episode: "What I Like About You"
2000–2003	Passions	Katherine Crane	5 episodes
2002	Push, Nevada	Jim's Mother	Episode: "The Letter of the Law"
2003	The Agency	Travel Agency Worker	Episode: "The Isolated Incident"
2004	Without a Trace	Brandee Case's Mother	Episode: "Wannabe"
2004	The Guardian	Rachel Gossett	Episode: "The Vote"
2004, 2005	Desperate Housewives	Janie Peterson	2 episodes
2005	CSI: Crime Scene Investigation	Mrs. Jones	Episode: "4x4"
2005	Six Feet Under	Andrea's Friend	Episode: "A Coat of White Primer"
2005	The Young and the Restless	Leslie Stanton	Episode #1.8214
