= Andrea Hall =

American actress (born 1947)

- Born: October 31, 1947 (age 78); Milwaukee, Wisconsin, U.S.
- Other names: Andrea Gengler; Andrea Hall-Gengler; Andrea Hall-Lovell; Andrea Lovell
- Occupation: Actress
- Years active: 1976–2001
- Notable work: Samantha Evans in Days of Our Lives
- Spouse: Thomas Gengler (until 2022)
- Relatives: Deirdre Hall (sister)

Andrea Hall (born October 31, 1947) is a retired American soap opera actress.

== Personal life ==
Hall is the identical twin sister of soap actress Deidre Hall.

== Career ==
From 1977 to 1982, Hall played Samantha Evans, the twin of her sister Deidre's character Marlena Evans, on Days of Our Lives. She returned to the show playing a Marlena-lookalike, Hattie Adams, from 2000 to 2001.

In 1989, Hall reportedly ran PuppyTracks, a mail-order company that manufactured mugs, music, sweatshirts, and other items related to TV soap operas.

== Filmography ==
Year	Film	Role	Notes
1976	Electra Woman and Dyna Girl	The Spider Lady / Electra Woman double	Episodes: "The Spider Lady: Part 1 and 2"
1977–1980, 1982; 2000–2001	Days of Our Lives	Samantha Evans / Hattie Adams	Main role
1977	Dinah!	Herself	Episode dated October 28
1985	The Twilight Zone	Beverly	Episode: "The Shadow Man/The Uncle Devil Show/Opening Day" (segment "Opening Day")
1995	Never Say Never: The Deidre Hall Story	Herself	TV movie; as Andrea Hall-Gengler
2001	Intimate Portrait	Herself	Episode: "Deidre Hall"
