= Jaime Lyn Bauer =

American actress

- Born: Norma Marvhne Bauer; March 9, 1949 (age 77); Phoenix, Arizona, U.S.
- Occupation: Actress
- Years active: 1973–present
- Spouse: Jeremy Swan (m. 1982)

Jaime Lyn Bauer (born Norma Marvhne Bauer; March 9, 1949, in Phoenix, Arizona) is an American television actress, best known for her soap opera roles as Lorie Brooks on The Young and the Restless and as Laura Horton on Days of Our Lives.

== Life and career ==
Bauer was born and raised in Phoenix, Arizona. She was Miss Phoenix winner and 1968 Miss Illinois pageant. In 1972, she made her big-screen debut in the sex comedy The Sexpert. She later starred in the sexploitation thriller The Centerfold Girls (1974). She turned down a seven-year contract with Universal Pictures in 1973 and chose a three-year contract with the CBS daytime soap opera The Young and the Restless. She played the role of Lorie Brooks from 1973 to 1982 with reprises in 1984, 2002, and 2018. In 1982, she had a cameo appearance in the comedy film Young Doctors in Love.

Bauer guest-starred on numerous primetime TV shows, including The Rookies (in an episode that served as the pilot for S.W.A.T.), The F.B.I., Bronk, Baretta, Kate McShane, CHiPS, Time Express, Lottery!, Mike Hammer, The Young Riders, Fantasy Island, The Love Boat, Hotel and Knots Landing. She starred in a number of made-for-television films, including Mysterious Island of Beautiful Women (1979), Pray TV (1981), and Where the Hell's That Gold?!!? (1988). In 1983, she was regular cast member in the short-lived NBC prime time soap opera Bare Essence. In 1992, she starred in the Judith Krantz's Secrets, an Italian prime time soap opera starring alongside Peggy Lipton, Timothy Gibbs, Fabiana Udenio and Sally Ann Howes.

In 1993, Bauer was cast as Laura Horton on the NBC soap opera Days of Our Lives. The character of Laura, previously played by Susan Flannery and Rosemary Forsyth (among others), had not been seen in 13 years. She played Laura from 1993 to 1999 with reprises in 2003, 2010, 2013, 2016, 2018 and 2021.

In addition to being on the cover of Playboy in February 1970, Bauer was to appear again in January 1982, in "The Women of the Soaps: The Bad and the Beautiful".

In 1982, Bauer married Emmy award-winning make-up artist Jeremy Swan. They have three children.

== See also ==
- List of people in Playboy 1970–1979
