= Sarah Horton =

- Days of Our Lives character
- Linsey Godfrey as Sarah Horton
- Portrayed by: Colin Lewis (1981); Anthony Seaward (1981–1982); Katie Krell (1982–1983); Lisa Brinegar (1985–1989); Shauna Lane-Block (1989); Aimee Brooks (1990–1991); Allison Brown (1991); Linsey Godfrey (2018–present)
- Duration: 1981–1983; 1985–1991; 2018–present
- First appearance: December 25, 1981
- Created by: Pat Falken Smith
- Introduced by: Betty Corday and Al Rabin (1981, 1985); Ken Corday, Albert Alarr and Greg Meng (2018)
In-universe information
- Other names: Renée DuMonde
- Occupation: Candy-striper; Doctor with Doctors Without Borders
- Family: Horton
- Parents: Neil Curtis; Maggie Horton; Mickey Horton (legal)
- Stepparents: Victor Kiriakis
- Sisters: Melissa Horton (adoptive/legal); Janice Barnes (foster/legal)
- Half-brothers: Nathan Curtis II; Daniel Jonas
- Half-sisters: Noelle Curtis; Summer Townsend
- Spouse: Rex Brady (2019, 2023); Xander Kiriakis (2022–2023, 2024–2026)
- Children: Mackenzie Horton; Victoria Kiriakis
- Grandparents: Nathan Curtis I; Elmer Simmons; Dorothy Simmons; Tom Horton (legal); Alice Horton (legal)
- Aunts and uncles: Tommy Horton (legal); Bill Horton (legal); Marie Horton (legal); Addie Horton (legal)
- Nieces and nephews: Melanie Jonas; Nathan Horton (adoptive); Parker Jonas; Holly Jonas
- First cousins: Steven Olson (legal); Julie Olson Williams (legal); Hope Williams Brady (legal); Mike Horton (legal); Jennifer Horton (legal); Lucas Horton (legal); Sandy Horton (legal); Jessica Blake Fallon (legal)

Sarah Horton is a fictional character from Days of Our Lives, an American soap opera on Peacock. Created by Pat Falken Smith, and introduced by Betty Corday and Al Rabin, Sarah is the daughter of Neil Curtis (Joseph Gallison) and Maggie Horton (Suzanne Rogers). In 2018, under head writer Ron Carlivati, the character was reintroduced with actress Linsey Godfrey in the role. In March 2021, Godfrey departed the role, but returned in January 2022.

Godfrey's performance in the role received positive reviews from audiences and critics, earning her four Daytime Emmy Award nominations for Outstanding Supporting Actress in a Drama Series in 2019, 2024, 2025, and 2026.

== Casting ==
On January 24, 1990, 15-year-old teenage actress Aimee Brooks joined the cast as Sarah Horton, this time as a grown-up teenage girl before Brooks left in 1991. On February 8, 1991, former Miss Teen USA 1986 Allison Brown joined the cast as Sarah Horton until she left later that year. In July 2018, it was announced that actress Linsey Godfrey had joined the cast as Sarah Horton. She debuted on October 26, 2018. In March 2021, Godfrey announced her departure from the soap; she last appeared on March 29. On January 7, 2022, it was announced that Godfrey would be reprising her role, with her returning to air on January 18.

== Storylines ==
Sarah is born to Neil Curtis and Maggie Horton. She was conceived through artificial insemination and was believed to be the daughter of Evan Whyland. It is not until she was a teen that they find out her father was Neil. To Sarah, Mickey Horton, Maggie's first husband, is her main father figure, as Mickey raised and loved Sarah as if she were his own blood. Evan gives up his legal rights when Sarah is an infant, but Mickey never adopts her. Sarah leaves town with her sister, Melissa, in 1991. They settle in Nashville, and Sarah is mentioned to have returned in 2010 for Mickey's funeral.

In 2018, Sarah, now a doctor, returns to Salem engaged to Rex Brady, and becomes entangled in the short-lived custody battle of Holly Jonas. Sarah breaks up with Rex when she discovers that he cheated on her with Mimi Lockhart, who comes to town with his baby, Emily Lockhart. Rex later admits to sleeping with Sarah's paternal half-sister Noelle, and a furious Sarah seeks revenge by looking to Rex's brother Eric Brady for comfort, but feels rejected when he turns her down. She leaves and sleeps with Xander Kiriakis. She once again becomes engaged to Rex, and later marries him, only for the relationship to end months later as Sarah secretly has feelings for Eric. Upon the return of Nicole Walker, Eric and Sarah end their relationship. Soon after, Sarah discovers she is pregnant with Eric's child; a year later, it was discovered that after giving birth to a stillborn daughter, Xander orchestrated a swap of Sarah's baby for Kristen DiMera (Stacy Haiduk)'s daughter with Brady Black (Eric Martsolf). She gets engaged to Xander, but when the truth comes out about the baby swap, she breaks up with him. They later reconcile, but on the eve of her wedding, Sarah sees Kristen —who has escaped from prison — and in an act of desperation, Kristen ties her up and steals her identity to frame her as a cheater by lying to Rex that "Sarah" is still in love with him.

== Reception ==
Godfrey's work in the role has been met with acclaim from critics and audiences, earning her four Daytime Emmy Award nominations for Outstanding Supporting Actress in a Drama Series in 2019, 2024, 2025, and 2026.
