= Addie Horton =

- Days of our Lives character
- Patricia Barry as Addie Williams
- Portrayed by: Patricia Huston (1965–66); Patricia Barry (1971–74)
- Duration: 1965–1966; 1971–1974
- First appearance: November 10, 1965
- Last appearance: December 18, 1974
- Created by: Peggy Phillips and Kenneth Rosen
- Introduced by: Ted Corday (1965); Betty Corday (1971)
In-universe information
- Occupation: Housewife
- Family: Horton
- Parents: Tom Horton; Alice Horton
- Siblings: Tom Horton Jr. Mickey Horton; Bill Horton; Marie Horton
- Husband: Ben Olson (1948–71); Doug Williams (1972–74)
- Children: Julie Olson; Steve Olson; Hope Williams
- Grandchildren: David Banning; Spencer Olson; Shawn-Douglas Brady; Zack Brady; Ciara Brady
- Grandparents: William Horton; Adelaide Horton; Sid Grayson; Abigail Grayson
- Nieces and nephews: Sandy Horton; Mike Horton; Jessica Blake Fallon; Melissa Horton (adoptive); Jennifer Horton; Lucas Horton; Sarah Horton (legal)
- Other relatives: Eli Grant; Claire Brady; Bo Weston; Addie Weston

Addie Horton is a fictional character on the television soap opera Days of Our Lives, portrayed by Patricia Huston from November 10, 1965, to March 9, 1966, and Patricia Barry from April 19, 1971, to June 28, 1974. Barry reprised her role as Addie for one episode on December 18, 1974.

== Storylines ==
Addie Williams is the daughter of Tom and Alice Horton. She has four other siblings; her twin brother, Tommy; and Mickey, Bill and Marie Horton. She was first married to wealthy banker Ben Olson and had two children with him, Steven Olson and Julie Williams. Ben and Addie left Salem in 1966, but Addie returned to Salem in 1971 after Ben's death. Addie disapproved of Julie's fiancé, Doug Williams, but ended up marrying him on the night that he was meant to marry Julie, leaving Julie crushed.

Addie soon discovered that she was ill with Leukumia and that she was pregnant. Despite her doctor's warnings, she decided to keep her baby and let the cancer take its course instead of fighting it and harming the baby. Addie soon gave birth to her and Doug's first and only child together, a baby girl named Hope. Soon afterwards though Addie was deathly ill and soon realized that she wouldn't live long. So as she was taking a walk one day with her daughter, a car spun out towards them. Addie pushed her daughter's stroller to safety and let the car hit her so her daughter would survive, while Addie was instantly killed.

Addie died when Hope was only nine days old, and of those nine years she'd only appeared in five of them, and yet, a full thirty-six years later, Addie's legacy remains and she's still one of the most oft-mentioned deceased characters. As the only child of Tom and Alice's that died young, Addie was always an inherently emotional subject. Every Christmas at the Horton ornament hanging you could count on a tender moment where someone, usually one of her kids, would hang up Addie's ornament wistfully. Even while other long-gone members of the Horton clan get pruned off the family tree (Steven, David, Scotty, even Tommy), Addie remains a central part of it. The reason, of course, is an obvious one. Though the effect Addie herself had on the show is minimal, both of her daughters were such rampantly important characters that Addie's place in Days history could never be anything but significant. For the first twenty years this show essentially belonged to Julie, and for the next twenty years it belonged to Hope. And because Julie and Hope are so important, everyone that's important to them is also important - and that's Addie.
