= Maggie Horton =

Fictional character from the television show Days of Our Lives

- Days of our Lives character
- Portrayed by: Suzanne Rogers
- Duration: 1973–present
- First appearance: August 20, 1973
- Created by: William J. Bell
- Introduced by: Betty Corday (1973); Betty Corday and Al Rabin (1985); Ken Corday and Stephen Wyman (2004)
In-universe information
- Other names: Margaret Simmons; Maggie Kiriakis
- Occupation: Business executive; Restaurant owner; Day spa owner; Investor; Hospital volunteer
- Family: Horton
- Father: Elmer Simmons
- Mother: Dorothy Simmons
- Spouse: Mickey Horton (1974–1984, 1986–2010) (Note: Mickey and Maggie first married in January 1974; however the marriage was invalid because he was still legally married to Laura. Laura and Mickey divorced in October 1974, and Mickey and Maggie were remarried that same month. Their divorce was finalized in January 1984.); Victor Kiriakis (2011–2023) (Note: After Victor's funeral, Vivian Alamain claims her divorce from Victor was never finalized, with Justin Kiriakis verifying her claims during the September 11, 2023, episode.)
- Sons: Daniel Jonas
- Daughters: Summer Townsend; Sarah Horton
- Adoptive daughters: Melissa Horton; Janice Barnes (foster)
- Stepsons: Bo Brady; Xander Kiriakis; Philip Kiriakis
- Grandsons: Nathan Horton (adoptive); Parker Jonas
- Granddaughters: Melanie Jonas; Holly Jonas; Mackenzie Brady; Victoria Cook

Maggie Horton Kiriakis is a fictional character from the American Peacock/NBC network soap opera Days of Our Lives played by Suzanne Rogers since 1973, the longest running role on the show, and one of the longest running in American soap operas.

The character was created by scriptwriter William J. Bell and producer Betty Corday as a romantic interest for original character Mickey Horton (John Clarke). For her work as Maggie, Rogers won the Daytime Emmy Award for Outstanding Supporting Actress in a Drama Series in 1979.

Maggie's storylines often focus on romance and family troubles. She is portrayed as a stoic, opinionated, and family-oriented woman who is generally loving and supportive, but occasionally interferes in her friends' and relatives' lives. A prominent storyline in 1984 included Maggie discovering that she had Myasthenia Gravis, which mirrored Rogers' real-life struggles with the disease. In 2003, Maggie was killed off in a "whodunnit?" murder storyline involving a serial killer. Rogers returned to the show in 2004 after producer James E. Reilly decided to have all the murder victims turn up alive on the island of Melaswen, or "New Salem" spelled backwards.

Maggie's most well-known relationship was her longtime marriage to original series character Mickey Horton. The characters met during Rogers' first episode in 1973, when Maggie cared for him while living on a farm. Following a series of experiences together, the pair grew extremely close, and their bond became central to both characters until Mickey's death in 2010. The character has been described as a "legend" and a television icon.

== Creation and casting ==
=== Background ===
Introduced as Maggie Simmons, Maggie is one of the earliest characters created by scriptwriter William J. Bell and executive producer Betty Corday. The character was brought on as a potential love interest for original character Mickey Horton. Shortly after, the two were married, connecting her to the soap's core family. Maggie is the mother of Melissa Horton (whom she adopted), Summer Townsend, Daniel Jonas, Janice Barnes (whom she fostered), and Sarah Horton. She has six grandchildren: Nathan Horton (via Melissa), Mackenzie Horton and Victoria Kiriakis (via Sarah), Melanie Jonas, Holly Jonas, and Parker Jonas (all via Daniel).

=== Casting ===
Suzanne Rogers auditioned for the role on July 13, 1973, and garnered the attention of Susan Flannery, who then played Dr. Laura Horton. Maggie was introduced as a guest character in August 1973, by scriptwriter William J. Bell and executive producer Betty Corday. From the beginning, Bell considered the role ideal for Rogers, a former Rockette from the Radio City Music Hall and Broadway chorus girl in such musicals as "Coco" and "Follies". Bell approached Rogers about taking the role of Maggie, and she agreed. She was immediately described by critics who gave reviews of the show as being one of the most energetic girls on daytime television. The news of Rogers being cast as Maggie was a different move, taking an actress who loves to dance, to a character of a crippled farm girl. This was her first television assignment, after being the youngest girl to take the stage at Radio City Music Hall.

In 1984, Rogers was diagnosed with a rare muscle disorder called Myasthenia Gravis. This disease affected her facial muscles and the medication she needed made her feel ill, with her face appearing swollen while also suffering hair loss. Rogers temporarily left the show after 11 years when the effects of the disease became increasingly worse. Her entire appearance changed, and she did not return to the show for a year. Rogers, wanting to educate viewers about the disease, approached executive producer Betty Corday about her character being diagnosed with the disease. Corday agreed, and a storyline played out with Maggie learning she has myasthenia gravis. The actress went into remission in 1995, and has remained in remission since. In 2010, Maggie began to notice some symptoms of the disease returning.

While limited attempts to give Maggie and Mickey storylines were made, for over a decade, they were relegated to supporting status, often off the front burner and with relative little airtime. Maggie was made more of a confidant to other major characters and often was written as the town busy-body, although an environmental plot twist had Maggie making her five star restaurant Salem's first "green" establishment. In 2003, a major series of serial killings occurred on the show. Maggie was "killed off" in a "whodunnit?" murder storyline involving a serial killer. Maggie's murder forced Rogers to depart from the series. To help with falling ratings at the time, head writer James E. Reilly decided to bring all the characters back from the dead. They all turned up in the fictional town of Melaswen, or New Salem spelt backwards. This storyline sparked major controversy, and proved to be a daring move.

After several unsuccessful re-casts of the character of Mickey, the decision was made to kill him off and, in January 2010, Maggie was made a widow. Her storyline moved from supporting to front burner status with the decision to pair her with wealthy Victor Kiriakis and giving her a nasty rival with Vivian Alamain who was married to Victor at the time. After this storyline ended, Victor and Maggie were married, although she maintained her role as Horton matriarch. Maggie's life became further complicated by the revelation that Dr. Daniel Jonas was really the product of the eggs she had given in hopes of having a child years ago. Her airtime, relegated to only sporadic appearances for years (unless storyline had dictated her appearing more), became greater, and for the first time since the mid 1980s, she was considered a front burner character. This continued well past the mid 2010s, even after the leading characters of John and Marlena returned to the show, and exploded into leading character status once again in early 2016 after Daniel was suddenly killed off and other characters were introduced to create drama for both Maggie and Victor.

=== Awards ===
Rogers was the first winner for the Daytime Emmy Award for Outstanding Supporting Actress in a Drama Series in 1979 for her portrayal of Maggie as an alcoholic.

== Character development and impact ==
=== Early storylines ===
Maggie Simmons lives on a farm out in the country where she hires hands to take care of her farm. Maggie is crippled as the result of a childhood auto-accident which killed her parents. One day Mickey Horton, suffering from memory problems believing he is a man named "Marty Hanson", stumbles into her farmhouse desperate for food and water, and soon collapses. Maggie, who is lonesome for company, takes Mickey in and cares for him in his weak condition.

"Maggie was suffering from ill health ... It was at this stage of the storyline in 1973 that she was crippled, but then Mickey came on and luck ran in her favor. Things took a turn for the worse in the eighties when the character and I were diagnosed with myasthenia gravis, but at this point being cured to keep Mickey was her determination."

— —Suzanne Rogers

Maggie and "Marty" continue to live on the farm, and in 1974 they marry. "Marty" begins reading about a treatment for injuries such as Maggie's being done at Salem University Hospital, and sets up an appointment for Maggie to be checked out. However, when Maggie goes to the hospital she sees on one of the desks a picture of Mickey without a beard, and she hears stories about a patient named Mickey Horton who disappeared around the same time that "Marty" appeared at her farm. Maggie leaves the hospital and does not return or tell "Marty" what she learned. Later the Hortons eventually are led to the farm after seeing Mickey's picture in a newspaper. Determined to stay married to Mickey, Maggie undergoes the operation to regain the use of her legs in hopes it will help her hold onto Mickey.

In 1975 Maggie is operated on by Bill Horton (Mickey's brother), but she still cannot walk. Laura Horton (Bill's wife and Mickey's ex-wife) explains to her that her paralysis is no longer physical, but mental. Maggie is so afraid of losing Mickey that she is causing the paralysis in her mind. After Mickey officially divorces Laura, Mickey and Maggie are married on Jan 25, 1975.

=== Marriage to Mickey ===
Maggie's marriage to Mickey Horton is central to the character, with their relationship being among the most prominent and long-running relationships on the show. Mickey is depicted as a smart, tough lawyer, with Maggie being portrayed as a weak farm girl. Maggie and Mickey were generally depicted as the most stable couple on the show, even after all the torment the two had gone through. During the early years of their marriage, Maggie felt threatened by the presence of his old lover, Linda Patterson, who had pretended to be Maggie's friend but was secretly trying to win Mickey back. Linda had claimed that Mickey was her daughter Melissa's father, but Linda's estranged husband Jim Phillips revealed that Linda had lied. While Linda went on to other relationships (including Mickey's brother Tommy and the wealthy Bob Anderson whom she married), she continued to remain a thorn in Maggie's side. After Bob Anderson's death, Melissa ran away from the neglectful Linda and eventually Mickey and Maggie took her in, sending her to a private school outside of Salem.

In 1978, Janice (Mickey and Maggie's adoptive daughter) is taken away from Mickey and Maggie by her natural mother Joanna Barnes. Janice is eventually found and returned to Mickey and Maggie, but Joanna takes a job in Salem and stays close to her daughter. This relationship takes its toll on Maggie and she begins to drown her sorrows in alcohol. Later that year Maggie's drinking increases and she is arrested when she has an accident with Janice in her car, both are knocked unconscious and taken to the hospital.

Maggie joins Alcoholics Anonymous but falls off the wagon when Janice's custody hearing becomes near. Afraid to lose Janice to her biological mother, Maggie kidnaps Janice and flees town with her. She eventually returns to Salem after her father-in-law, Tom Horton finds her in a nearby town. Later Janice has an accident on the pier while playing with little Melissa. Janice falls into the water, and as a result slipped into a coma. Joanna Barnes and Maggie fought over her at the hospital, but in the end Joanna is given custody of her daughter. In 1979 Maggie unknowingly sells some canes containing cocaine to customers of Julie's (Mickey's niece) shop. Later when a drug dealer comes looking for them the two struggled and Maggie eventually shoots him with his own gun.

In 1981 Maggie agrees to be a surrogate mother for an anonymous donor. Maggie goes to Neil (the donor) and agrees to be inseminated. Neil performs the procedure, and Maggie soon becomes pregnant. Later that year Dr. Evan Whyland comes to Salem, and Neil knows he is the anonymous donor of Maggie's. When Evan learns about this he begins to call on Maggie often.

Mickey learns that the baby she is carrying is Evan Whyland's, and even when he tells Maggie she wants to keep the baby, so Mickey agrees to love the baby as his daughter. In late 1981 Sarah Horton is born, and after a custody battle with Evan Whyland, Mickey and Maggie win custody of Sarah. In 1982, Melissa Anderson runs away from her private school, unable to deal with her trouble-making mother, Linda who wanted her back in order to get her hands on Anderson manufacturing, and Melissa ends up in Mickey and Maggie's home. When Linda discovers her there, she tries to have her removed physically, and Mickey and Maggie decide to fight for custody of her. At the hearing, Linda does not show up, and the judge grants custody to the Hortons. Evan often pays visits to Maggie and little Sarah, and powerful crime lord Stefano DiMera suspects Maggie knows of Evan's evidence against him and tries to have Maggie killed by tampering with the brakes in her car. Mickey and Don (Mickey's partner) begin to investigate Stefano after Evan Whyland dies, and when Mickey gets too close to Stefano, Stefano kidnaps Mickey while making it appear that he had died in a car crash. Don begins to spend time with Maggie, and eventually falls in love with her. When Don finally tells Maggie she is speechless. In 1983, Maggie and Don eventually professes their love to one another. Mickey escapes from Stefano and returns to Salem. When he sees his wife and Don declare their love to each other, Mickey has a heart attack. Maggie and Mickey divorce in 1983, and soon after Maggie stops seeing Don, realizing her divorce from Mickey was a mistake. Maggie leaves for New York in 1984, but returns the following year. Mickey is accidentally shot during a gang rumble. He recuperates at Maggie's house, and the two rekindle their love. On February 14, 1986, Mickey and Maggie remarry in a double wedding with Melissa Anderson and Pete Jannings (Melissa's fiancé). Soon after they remarry, Maggie is diagnosed with Myasthenia Gravis, which eventually goes into remission.

Maggie and Mickey's marriage is in trouble by 1990. Mickey is always at work and constantly lets down Maggie and misses dinner dates and other important functions. Maggie ends up seeking solace in the arms of doctor Neil Curtis. Maggie's daughter, Sarah, caught Maggie and Neil and takes pictures of them together in bed. Sarah is ready to expose them when Maggie and Neil reveal a shocking secret to her: Neil is Sarah's true father. Sarah still exposes them and the news devastates her adopted father, Mickey. Though Mickey is hurt, he feels he is partly to blame for Maggie's infidelity. Mickey and Maggie patch up their marriage, and Neil leaves Salem.

When Julie Williams leave Salem in 1993, Alice and Maggie Horton turned Wings (a popular restaurant) into Alice's Restaurant. In 1993, Alice and Maggie Horton invest in Billie Reed's up and coming cosmetics company "Countess Wilhelmina". Maggie has very little story after that until she purchases Tuscany (a local restaurant) and makes herself into the town busybody.

When Maggie is apparently murdered by a serial killer in 2003, it comes as a shock when Mickey starts a relationship with Bonnie Lockhart. Bonnie was Maggie's nemesis, and former housekeeper. This relationship lasts for the better part of 2003, and into much of 2004. Maggie is found on the island of Melaswen (New Salem spelled backwards). Maggie returns to Salem only to learn her husband Mickey is in a relationship with Bonnie. A furious and embarrassed Maggie tries everything to win back his love. This is about the time that longtime veteran John Clarke retired as Mickey Horton, and is replaced by actor John Ingle.

=== Salem Stalker ===
In 2003, Mickey and Maggie are attacked in their home by close friend Marlena Evans. Mickey survives, but unfortunately, the hit from the alcohol bottle and a deep stab wound ends Maggie's life. She is the third victim of the Salem Serial killer, who is murdering the citizens of Salem, including Maggie's mother in law, Alice Horton. Maggie returns to Salem when she and the rest of the serial killer "victims" are rescued from the island where crime lord Stefano DiMera's nephew Andre DiMera had kept them. Andre framed and drugged Marlena Evans to believe that she is the serial killer. Maggie's return is bitter sweet as she learns that Mickey has moved on with his life and married Bonnie Lockhart. Desperate to win her husband back, Maggie, Doug (Julie's husband), and Julie work hard to show that Bonnie is just trying to extort money from Mickey and that she will never really love him. They are successful and Mickey and Maggie settle back into their life together. Maggie begins running the upscale restaurant Chez Rouge and Mickey continues to practice law. Maggie continues to be the primary confidant and supporter of her nephew-in-law Lucas.

=== Mickey and Alice's deaths ===
I was stunned by the decision to kill Mickey. They didn’t want to recast the role, so they needed to tie up that loose end. In the scripts, we kept talking about Mickey being out of town, or being in trial. He was always somewhere else. The audience that’s watched us a while knew who Mickey was, but the new viewers didn’t know who the devil we were talking about. It was hard, because John Clarke [the original Mickey] is still very much alive and well. I called him and said “I hope I do you proud.” There was one good thing about it—we could use those great old Mickey-and-Maggie flashbacks, because in later years when they recast the role with John Ingle, and then Kevin Dobson, we couldn’t go back and use any of my scenes with John. By removing the character from the page, we were able to go into the archives and pull out some really glorious stuff. "

— Suzanne Rogers

In 2010, after Julie convinces Maggie that she and Mickey need to spend some "alone time" together, Maggie books a cruise. Mickey is upstairs packing, and when Maggie goes to check on him, she discovers that he had died of a heart attack, leaving her a widow. Maggie has had a difficult time dealing with the fact that her husband is gone, and fears facing life without Mickey. On January 14, 2010, Mickey's memorial service takes place which includes Hortons from the past and present comforting Maggie. The grieving Maggie is briefly tempted by a bottle of alcohol she finds in Mickey's office but instead pours it down the sink.

In June 2010, Maggie takes care of an ill Alice Horton. Maggie finds Alice Horton has died in her sleep and comes downstairs to deliver the news. Maggie grieves not only losing her mother-in-law, but is in shock that two people she loved very much died just a few months apart. This death positioned Maggie as the new matriarch of the Horton family. A visiting Marie Horton consoles Maggie with the reminder of how proud she was to have her as her sister-in-law.

=== Victor and new beginnings ===
After Mickey dies in 2010, Maggie begins a new friendship with Victor Kiriakis. The two grow closer, despite Victor's marriage to Vivian Alamain. The vengeful Vivian plots to have Maggie entombed in a crypt in the Kiriakis mausoleum, but as fate will have it, ends up there herself. When Vivian is freed, she manages to entrap Maggie, and for days, her relatives are worried about her absence. Eventually, Victor finds her and she is rushed to the hospital. Maggie is stunned when she discovers that Victor knew Vivian was entrapped and did nothing about it. After Victor demands a divorce from Vivian, he begins to court Maggie. She struggles to accept Victor and his criminal past, but is able to build a relationship with him. Maggie and Victor begin to date and Victor proposes to Maggie in September 2011. During their engagement, Hope comes across a letter from Alice to Maggie, written the day before Alice died. Alice reminds Maggie about an experimental program she and Mickey entered into over thirty years prior, Maggie had attempted to harvest some of her eggs. Eventually she and Mickey abandoned the project, though the eggs were preserved. It was revealed that Daniel Jonas was her biological son, a product of these missing eggs. This also makes Melanie Layton her granddaughter. On November 8, 2011, Victor and Maggie get married. That Christmas, Julie tells Maggie that she will always be a member of the Horton family, and extends an ornament to Victor, Daniel, and Melanie, despite their not being biological Hortons. In 2012, Maggie and Victor experience brief marital trouble when it is revealed that Victor knew about Maggie's missing eggs all those years. Maggie was eventually able to forgive him although she continues to keep him in line when his ruthless ways get the better of him. Maggie also said goodbye to Melanie, who left town. Additionally, Maggie opened her home to her nephew, Nick Fallon, Marie's grandson, who was recently paroled. Though Maggie has a new husband, son, granddaughter, and home, she is considered to be the matriarch of the Horton family and still maintains a relationship with the members of the Horton family. In February 2016 her son Daniel Jonas was injured in a car accident that also injured Eric Brady, Brady Black and Jennifer Horton. He eventually dies from his injuries and Maggie makes the decision to take Daniel off Life Support and donate his heart to her Step-Grandson Brady. Maggie's life began to get more complicated when a young woman named Summer showed up in Salem and informed her that she was the child Maggie had when she was only 17 and had believed to be stillborn. In the middle of all of this, Victor's estranged brother, Deimos, showed up, vowing revenge against Victor. He poisoned Maggie with pills that caused her to have dizzy spells. After one serious dizzy spell, Maggie fell down the stairs in the Kiriakis mansion, was rushed to the hospital, where Victor was informed that not only had she broken her back, but that her legs were once again paralyzed, like they had been when she had first met Mickey. Victor learned that Deimos had poisoned her and had an antidote which he would give Maggie on the condition that Victor turn all his assets over to him. Determined to save Maggie from instant death, Victor agreed. Maggie's recovery seemed more psychological than physical, but with support from her husband and the Horton's, Maggie became encouraged to fight to walk once again, and Victor declared his determination to stand by her in her time of need, even deciding to retire from Titan to devote all of his time to her.

In August 2023, Maggie loses Victor when he is killed off screen due to his plane crashing into the Mediterranean Sea.

== Further reception ==
In 2020, Charlie Mason from Soaps She Knows placed Maggie at 17th on a list of the 35 most memorable characters from Days of Our Lives, saying "We'd raise a glass to Suzanne Rogers' iconic character, who's withstood the ravages of everything from paralysis to marriage to No. 25 [Mickey] to… well, that's why we can't enjoy our tippling — alcoholism!"
