= Martha Nix Wade =

American actress

- Born: September 26, 1967 (age 58); Orange County, California, U.S.
- Occupations: Actress; author; speaker
- Spouse: Gary Wade
- Children: 2

Martha Nix Wade (born September 26, 1967) is an American actress, best known for her roles as Janice Horton on the NBC daytime soap opera Days of Our Lives and Serena Burton on the CBS drama The Waltons.

== Personal life ==
Born on September 26, 1967 in Orange County, California, Wade began acting at an early age. At age 7, she landed the role of Janice Horton on the NBC daytime soap opera Days of Our Lives. While experiencing success as a child actress, Wade was being sexually molested by a neighbor. She details how she overcame the abuse in her 2011 autobiography, My Secret Life: A Truthful Look at a Child Actor's Victory Over Sexual Abuse. She and her husband, Gary, are the parents of 2 children. On January 15, 2021, Martha and Gary's son, Ryder, was tragically killed in a motorcycle accident as he was leaving water polo practice at Concordia University of Irvine. The family has established the Ryder Wade Foundation to distribute income for charitable purposes.

== A Quarter Blue ==
In 2007, Wade created the not-for-profit organization A Quarter Blue, with the goals of stopping childhood sexual abuse through education and empowering survivors to begin the process of healing. Based in Orange, California, A Quarter Blue offers resources and training opportunities.

== Filmography ==
- Days of Our Lives (1976–1979)
- The Waltons (1979–1980)
- Little House on the Prairie (1979–1981)
- Aloha Paradise (1981)
- Archie Bunker's Place (1981–1982)
- Silver Spoons (1983)
- It's Your Move (1984)
- Safe At Home (1986)
