= Bill Horton (Days of Our Lives) =

- Days of Our Lives character
- Portrayed by: Paul Carr (1965–1966); Edward Mallory (1966–1980, 1991–1993); Christopher Stone (1987–1988, 1994); Peter White (1987); John Martin (2010)
- Duration: 1965–1980; 1987–1988; 1991–1994; 2010
- First appearance: December 22, 1965
- Last appearance: June 28, 2010
- Created by: Peggy Phillips and Kenneth Rosen
- Introduced by: Ted Corday
In-universe information
- Other names: William Horton II
- Occupation: Surgeon; Physician
- Family: Horton
- Parents: Tom Horton; Alice Horton
- Brothers: Tom Horton, Jr.; Mickey Horton
- Sisters: Addie Horton; Marie Horton
- Wife: Laura Spencer (1974–1993)
- Sons: Mike Horton; Lucas Horton
- Daughters: Jennifer Horton
- Grandsons: Jeremy Horton; Will Horton; JJ Deveraux
- Granddaughters: Abigail Deveraux; Allie Horton
- Other relatives: Arianna Horton; Thomas DiMera; Charlotte DiMera; Henry Horton

William Horton is a fictional character from the American NBC daytime soap opera, Days of Our Lives. He was a surgeon, and was one of the five children of the show's original couple, Tom and Alice Horton. Bill was a regular character on Days of Our Lives for most of its first fifteen years. The role is most associated with actor Edward Mallory, who portrayed the character for the greatest time.

== Casting ==
Paul Carr originated the role, playing Bill from December 22, 1965, to January 3, 1966. The character was re-introduced on June 21, 1966, when Edward Mallory began an almost fourteen-year run as Bill, playing him through to April 14, 1980. The character returned in the late eighties, when Christopher Stone played Bill for a six-month stint from September 11, 1987, to March 17, 1988. Peter White temporarily played Bill from October 13 to 15, 1987. Mallory reprised playing Bill in guest appearances from July 1 to 3, 1991, and then again in a short-term recurring capacity from October 15, 1992, to January 5, 1993. Stone also returned for a short stint from March 10 to July 19, 1994. Then, after a character-absence of nearly sixteen years, and after the deaths of the previous actors, John Martin appeared as Bill from June 15 to 28, 2010, for the funeral of Bill's mother, Alice Horton.

== Storylines ==
Named after his grandfather, Bill Horton is the youngest son of the Horton children; his siblings include Tom Horton Jr., Mickey Horton, Addie Horton, and Marie Horton. Bill (Paul Carr), an aspiring surgeon, initially appears at Christmas 1965 on vacation from medical school.

In June 1966, Bill (now Edward Mallory) took his first job at Salem University Hospital, where his father works. Here, he meets Dr. Laura Spencer, a young psychiatric intern, and begins dating her. His brother Mickey is also interested in Dr. Spencer. Although this causes problems with Mickey, Laura and Bill soon become engaged. Bill is stricken with bone tuberculosis of the hand, and it appears as though he will never be able to be a surgeon. Bill is devastated and leaves Salem to sort out his future and eventually take a medical position in another town.

In late 1967, Bill returned to Salem along with his friend Dr. Mark Brooks (later revealed to be his brother Tommy) and a little boy named Timmy McCall. Bill was living with the McCall family when Timmy's mother Mary died. Before passing, Mary made Bill promise to become Timmy's guardian. Bill had met Mark Brooks through Mary, and it was Mark who encouraged Bill to undergo therapy to regain control of his hand. When Timmy McCall needed his appendix removed, Bill performed the surgery and then knew he would be able to return to Salem and continue his surgical career.

While Bill was out of town, his brother Mickey and his ex-fiancé Laura became closer and became engaged. After Mickey and Laura wed, Bill is consumed with jealousy, and one night, while drunk, Bill rapes Laura in her office. When he awakes the next morning Bill cannot remember anything that happened; and Laura tells him she turned him away, in order to prevent a feud between Mickey, her husband, and Bill.

Laura soon becomes pregnant. Tom finds out about the pregnancy from a lab report and also discovers that Mickey is sterile. Laura explains to Tom that Bill raped her while he was drunk and that she didn't tell Mickey in order to prevent any fighting between the two. Tom agrees to keep the secret. Bill has also read the report about Mickey's infertility but keeps it to himself because he feels it best that no one knows. Laura soon delivers the baby, Michael William Horton (known later as Mike), on September 28, 1968.

Everyones happiness is ruined when Bill learns that Kitty Horton, Tommy's ex-wife, has a tape recording of Laura and Tom talking about Michael, in which they reveal Bill is Michael's natural father. Bill goes to Kitty's apartment and ransacks it and fights with Kitty before finding the tape and leaving. Shockingly, Kitty is killed later that night, and Bill is charged with Kitty's murder. Mickey, who is a lawyer, defends Bill in court. Bill refuses to tell anyone why he was at Kitty's place that night, and eventually, he is found guilty of involuntary manslaughter and sentenced to three years in prison.

In prison Bill meets Doug Williams, and his stories of Salem and a rich widowed Susan Martin, would send Doug to Salem after he is released. Near the end of 1970, Bill is released from prison and later begins seeing his brother's secretary Linda Patterson.

In 1972, Bill and Laura began to fall in love when Laura learned the true reason Bill went to jail. Laura plans to divorce Mickey and marry Bill. When the two are overheard talking by young Mike, Mike assumes they are having an affair and runs out into the street and is hit by a car. Mike survives, but afterwards, he tells his "Uncle Bill" that he hates him and needs to stay away from his family.

In 1973, Mickey suffers a massive coronary, but with Bill's skilled hands, he manages to save his brothers life. Soon after his operation, Mickey suddenly disappeared from Salem. With Mickey out of town, Bill is free to pursue Laura, but her marriage to Mickey still stands in the way. Mickey is discovered to be alive, but he has amnesia, and he grants Laura a divorce so he could remain with Maggie Simmons.

On December 4, 1975, after years of pursuing one another, Bill and Laura Horton marry. In January 1976, the truth about Mike's parentage comes out when Mike is injured while repairing a truck on Maggie Simmons' farm. Mickey and Laura both donate blood to save Mike's life, but neither match. Mickey finds out through Bill's medical records that Bill is a match, and Mickey's memory quickly floods back. Mickey is enraged and buys a gun and goes after Bill. Mickey waits for Bill to come home, and when he does, they both fight over the gun. Bill ends up being shot in the arm, and Mickey suffers a mental breakdown. Mickey was admitted to Bayview Sanitarium for one year following the incident. Bill's gunshot injury causes nerve damage and impaired feeling and use of his right hand, and he has to quit being a surgeon. Laura gives birth to their daughter Jennifer Rose Horton on September 11, 1976. After the birth, Laura falls into a deep depression, but she overcomes it with Bill and Dr. Marlena Evans help.

In 1977, Bill begins retraining as an anesthesiologist and becomes friends with the Head of Anesthesiology, Dr. Kate Winograd, and they start falling for each other. When a young, inexperienced resident surgeon panics in the operating room and walks out, Bill is forced to perform life-saving brain surgery with the assistance of Kate. Thanks to the physiotherapy Bill has been doing for his hand, Bill is able to do the surgery and save the life of the patient, Fred Barton. However, Barton is paralyzed from the waist down and sues the hospital, Bill and Kate. (The young surgeon who walked out lies and said Bill threw him out of the operating room). Bill and Kate are fired, and Barton sues for $2 million. Their joint situation causes Bill and Kate to become close to each other, and Laura is jealous. Bill and Laura's marriage is in trouble, and Bill moves out of their home and stays at the Salem Inn. Bill tries to pursue a relationship with Kate, but Kate does not want to be his mistress. Barton's paralysis turns out to be psychological, and when he walks into the courtroom, the case against Bill and Kate is thrown out. Bill embraces and kisses Kate in celebration, but Bill later apologises to Kate for his behavior, saying he loves Laura. Kate leaves town, and Bill and Laura repair their marriage.

In 1979, Laura's mentally ill mother kills herself, and Laura is traumatized and begins having hallucinations of her mom. Laura herself has a mental breakdown, and when she hallucinates her mom telling her to join her, Laura overdoses and tries to hang herself. Bill and Alice rescue her in the nick of time. Bill is forced to commit his wife to a sanitarium. In 1980, Bill leaves Salem to be nearer to the sanitarium and leaves his daughter Jennifer in the care of Tom and Alice.

Bill (now Christopher Stone) returns in 1987 and begins dating Janice Barnes. He eventually breaks things off when his guilt about Laura grows too strong. Bill focuses his attention on his daughter Jennifer and tries to put an end to his daughter's relationship with Frankie Brady. Jennifer retaliates by becoming engaged to Frankie but breaks it off when she fears she may become schizophrenic like her mother and grandmother.

Bill returns briefly in 1994 when Laura comes home from the sanitarium. Bill also wants to meet his son Lucas, his illegitimate son with Kate Roberts, but is coldly greeted by the young man who is angry because he grew up without a dad. Bill relocates to Africa to be a volunteer doctor. Jennifer and her partner Jack Deveraux, and their daughter Abigail joined him in Africa for a while.

Bill (John H. Martin) and his now ex-wife Laura visit Salem again in June 2010 when they receive news that Bill's mother, Alice Horton, is extremely ill.

On February 18, 2020, Jennifer received a phone call from her brother Lucas stating Bill had a heart attack in his sleep and died.

== Reception ==
In 2020, Charlie Mason from Soaps She Knows called Bill a "bad seed".
