= Alice Horton =

- Days of Our Lives character
- Portrayed by: Frances Reid; Sydney K. Smith (2024)
- Duration: 1965–2007, 2024
- First appearance: November 8, 1965
- Last appearance: 2024
- Created by: Peggy Phillips and Kenneth Rosen
- Introduced by: Ted Corday
- Spin-off appearances: Days of Our Lives: One Stormy Night (1992)
In-universe information
- Other names: Alice Grayson
- Occupation: Head of the Horton Center; Hospital figurehead Hospital board member Countess Wilhelmina board member Owner of Alice's Restaurant; Housewife
- Family: Horton
- Father: Sid Grayson
- Mother: Abigail Grayson
- Spouse: Tom Horton (1930–94)
- Sons: Tommy Horton Jr.; Mickey Horton; Bill Horton
- Daughters: Addie Horton; Marie Horton
- Grandsons: Steve Olson; Mike Horton; Lucas Horton
- Granddaughters: Julie Olson Williams; Sandy Horton; Jessica Blake Fallon; Hope Williams Brady; Jennifer Horton; Melissa Horton (adoptive); Janice Barnes (foster); Sarah Horton (legal)
- Other relatives: David Banning; Spencer Olson; Jeremy Horton; Nick Fallon; Shawn-Douglas Brady; Nathan Horton (adoptive); Abigail Deveraux; Will Horton; Zack Brady; JJ Deveraux; Ciara Brady; Allie Horton; Mackenzie Horton (legal); Victoria Horton-Cook (legal); Scotty Banning; Eli Grant; Claire Brady; Arianna Horton; Thomas DiMera; Charlotte DiMera; Henry Horton; David Grant; Carver Grant; Jules Grant; Bo Weston

Alice Horton is a fictional character on the NBC soap opera Days of Our Lives, portrayed by Frances Reid from the show's debut on November 8, 1965, until December 26, 2007.

In her role as matriarch of the Horton family, Alice's storylines focused on the many troubles of her children, grandchildren and great-grandchildren. Her marriage to Tom Horton (Macdonald Carey) played a key role from 1965 until 1994, when Carey died from lung cancer. Reid's portrayal earned her nominations for a Daytime Emmy Award for Supporting Actress in 1979 and for Lead Actress in 1987; she was awarded a Daytime Emmy Lifetime Achievement Award in 2004. Reid won the Soap Opera Digest Award for Outstanding Actress in a Mature Role in 1978, 1979, 1984, and 1985, and was inducted into the Television Academy's archives in 2003.

Reid died at age 95 on February 3, 2010.

== Storylines ==
Frances Reid as Alice Horton in a 1965 episode

As Days of our Lives begins in 1965, Alice is happily married to Dr. Tom Horton and endures the ongoing struggles of her adult children Addie, Mickey, Bill, and Marie; their son Tommy had been presumed dead in Korea. In 1967, Bill brings Dr. Mark Brooks to Salem. He and Marie fall in love, but the Hortons soon realize that Mark is Tommy, having lost his memory and undergone reconstructive surgery; because of this revelation, Marie becomes a nun. Addie dies in a car accident in 1974, and in 1977 Alice is shocked to discover that she has cancer. Alice turns out to have been misdiagnosed, and weathers Tom's subsequent heart attack.

In 1983, Alice is almost killed at Salem hospital by a robot being used to dispense medication. The same year, Roman Brady is accused of the Salem Slasher murders and, knowing he is innocent, Alice helps him escape. She brings him drugged donuts, and as he is being rushed to the hospital Alice helps his brother Bo block the road and affect Roman's escape. Abe Carver reluctantly arrests Alice, but she is later released. Unhappy that her granddaughter Hope is marrying Larry Welch in 1984, Alice helps Hope's true love Bo kidnap her so that Bo can profess his feelings. Discovering that Larry and his boss are involved with a criminal organization, Alice and Tom also try to foil their plans. Tom and Alice take in their granddaughter Jennifer Horton in 1987. That same year, Alice's former flame Dr. Simon Hopkins comes to town and tries to rekindle his romance with Alice. He turns out to be working for crime lord Victor Kiriakis and involved in the attempted killing of Harper Deveraux. Wanted by the police, Simon tries to take Alice hostage but is shot. In 1988, Alice suspects Tom of having an affair, but he is actually spending time at the Beat Bar, reading poetry written for Alice. In 1989, Alice discovers that the judge that had married them had not been legally sworn in; their marriage is technically invalid, and Tom had known all along. Tom proposes, and they remarry on October 17, 1989. Tom dies in his sleep in 1994.

A serial killer later called the Salem Stalker strikes in 2003, killing several longtime residents of Salem, including Doug Williams, the husband of Alice's granddaughter Julie, and Mickey's wife Maggie Horton. Visiting Tom's grave, Alice finds a note left by Doug which reveals the killer to be Alice's friend Marlena Evans. Marlena subsequently murders Alice by choking her with her signature donuts. Alice and Marlena's other "victims" are all later revealed to be alive and well as captives in Melaswen, a copy of Salem built on a remote tropical island by the villainous Andre DiMera (posing as Tony). Andre had faked their deaths and manipulated a drugged Marlena. On December 26, 2006, Alice appears at Christmas dinner, and later attends the annual Horton barbecue on July 4, 2007. She last appears on December 26, 2007, celebrating Christmas with the Hortons. Although Alice was not seen, she was referenced many times and remained part of the show until her death on June 23, 2010. During her final days, family members and friends came to Salem to say their final farewells.

In 2024, Alice appears in flashbacks as the family reminisces on the good times while salvaging through the charred remains of the Horton house. In further flashbacks, she is played by Sydney K. Smith where Tom and Alice are young and struggle until they buy the house for them and their children.

== Reception ==
In 2020, Charlie Mason from Soaps She Knows placed Alice fifth on his list of the 35 most memorable characters from Days of Our Lives, commenting that "The late, great Frances Reid's Horton matriarch was the grandma that we all wished we had — and the only thing in existence that was as sweet as her legendary donuts". In 2024, Mason included Alice in his list of the best mothers in American soap operas, writing "As sweet as her legendary donuts, the Horton family's indefatigably patient matriarch wasn't just a model mom to her own kids but a beloved surrogate one to countless lost souls in Salem". Mason also placed Alice 34th on his ranked list of Soaps' 40 Most Iconic Characters of All Time, writing, "The late Frances Reid's Salem counterpart was as sweet as her famous donuts — and the grandmother we all secretly wanted for our own."

== See also ==
- List of longest-serving soap opera actors
