= Joseph Gallison =

American actor (born 1935)

- Other name: Evan McCord
- Education: Northeastern University
- Occupation: Actor
- Spouses: Cornelia Sharpe; Melisa Evans

Joseph Gallison is an American actor who worked on television soap operas for twenty-seven years. He is probably best known for his role as Dr. Neil Curtis on Days of Our Lives (1974-1991).

== Early years ==
Born in Boston, Massachusetts, Gallison attended the United States Military Academy until an injury to his back led to his discharge from the Army. He then transferred to Northeastern University.

== Career ==
Gallison is well known for playing the character of William (Bill) Matthews, Jr., on Another World (1964-1969). Other soap opera roles have included Tom Edwards on One Life to Live (1969-1971) and Steven Cord on Return to Peyton Place (1972-1974).

Gallison is also heard in the You're Under Arrest series, dubbing the voice of Inspector Tokuno.

On May 19, 1961, Gallison, under the name Evan McCord, appeared as Billy Boy Baines in the episode "Caper in E Flat" of the ABC-Warner Brothers private detective series, 77 Sunset Strip.

On April 22, 1962, Gallison, under the name Evan McCord, appeared as Jim Martin, Jr., in the episode "The Youngest" of the ABC-Warner Brothers western series, Lawman.

== Personal life ==
Gallison married actress Cornelia Sharpe. He married realtor Melisa Evans in 1980. They are currently separated, and have no children.
