= Tom Horton =

Fictional character from Days of Our Lives

- Days of Our Lives character
- Portrayed by: MacDonald Carey; Zach Chyz (2024)
- Duration: 1965–94, 2024
- First appearance: November 8, 1965
- Last appearance: 2024
- Created by: Peggy Phillips and Kenneth Rosen
- Introduced by: Ted Corday
- Spin-off appearances: Days of Our Lives: One Stormy Night (1992)
In-universe information
- Other names: Dr. H Norm de Plume
- Occupation: Chief of Staff of Salem University Hospital; Doctor; Captain; Baseball player
- Family: Horton
- Parents: William Horton; Adelaide Horton
- Wife: Alice Grayson (1930–88, 1988–94)
- Children: Tom Horton, Jr. Addie Horton; Mickey Horton; Bill Horton; Marie Horton
- Grandchildren: Julie Olson Williams; Steve Olson; Sandy Horton; Jessica Blake Fallon; Mike Horton; Hope Williams Brady; Jennifer Horton; Melissa Horton (adoptive); Sarah Horton (legal); Lucas Horton

Thomas Horton is a fictional character and patriarch of the Horton family on the NBC soap opera Days of Our Lives. He was played by Macdonald Carey from 1965 until his death in 1994.

== Storylines ==
Tom Horton is born in 1910 and married his wife Alice Grayson on March 7, 1930. Tom is a prominent doctor at Salem University Hospital and has five children, Tommy, Addie, Mickey, Bill, and Marie. In 1968, Tom learns that Mickey is infertile, and when Tom confronts Mickey's wife, Laura Horton, about her pregnancy, she tells Tom that Bill had raped her. The two agreed to keep their secrets from Mickey in order to spare his feelings. In 1974, Tom is devastated when Addie is run over shortly after giving birth to Hope Williams.

In 1977, Tom has a heart attack and remains in the hospital for several months. In 1978, Tom is promoted to Chief of Staff at University Hospital. Tom reads poetry, which he wrote himself, under the name Norm De Plume, wearing a disguise so Alice wouldn't know what he was up to. When it is discovered their first marriage was invalid they marry again on October 17, 1989. In 1993, Alice and Tom set up and found the Horton Center, which runs out of their home and provides shelter and help to run-away teens or families in need. Tom last appears on February 9, 1994 due to Carey's failing health. Following Carey's death in March 1994, the character of Tom dies off screen on June 21, 1994.

In 2024, Tom appears in flashbacks as the family reminisces on the good times while salvaging through the charred remains of the Horton house. In further flashbacks, he is played by Zach Chyz where Tom and Alice are young and struggle until they buy the house for them and their children.

== Reception ==
For his role as Tom, Carey won the Outstanding Actor in a Daytime Drama Series Award at the 1st Daytime Emmy Awards in 1974. In 2020, Charlie Mason from Soaps She Knows placed Tom as #7 on a list of the 35 most memorable characters from Days of Our Lives, commenting that "Only the hourglass itself could possibly be a bigger part of the DNA of Days of Our Lives than the much-missed MacDonald Carey’s family man, a steadying presence in a town that desperately needed it". Mason also placed Tom 37th on his ranked list of Soaps' 40 Most Iconic Characters of All Time, writing, "For nearly three decades, Macdonald Carey prescribed viewers a steadying presence as the doctor at the head of Salem's Horton family."
