= Neil Curtis =

- Days of Our Lives character
- Portrayed by: Ben Archibek (1974); Joseph Gallison (1974–91)
- Duration: 1974–1991
- First appearance: January 10, 1974
- Last appearance: October 16, 1991
- Created by: William J. Bell
- Introduced by: Betty Corday
In-universe information
- Occupation: Doctor
- Father: Nathan Curtis
- Spouse: Phyllis Anderson (1975–79); Marie Horton (1983); Liz Chandler (1984–87); Anjelica Deveraux (1988–89)
- Children: Nathan Curtis; Sarah Horton; Noelle Curtis
- Granddaughters: Mackenzie Horton; Victoria Kiriakis
- Nephews: Pete Curtis
- First cousins: Peter Curtis

Neil Curtis is a fictional character from the television drama Days of Our Lives. He was portrayed by Joseph Gallison from February 13, 1974, to October 16, 1991.

Neil was a doctor and a compulsive gambler. He had a daughter, Sarah Horton, with Maggie Horton.

He was last seen talking about Carly with Victor; then Neil said he was leaving because he had patients to see. The character then disappeared without explanation. On October 29, 2018, Maggie tells Sarah that Neil "would be so proud" of Sarah for becoming a doctor.
