= List of Days of Our Lives characters introduced in the 1980s =

A list of notable characters from the NBC soap opera Days of Our Lives that significantly impacted storylines and debuted between January 1, 1980, and the end of 1989, in order of first appearance.

== DJ Craig ==
DJ Craig
- Days of Our Lives character
- Portrayed by: Matthew Bischof
- Duration: 1980
- First appearance: March 18, 1980
- Last appearance: May 22, 1980
- Created by: Ann Marcus
- Introduced by: Betty Corday and Al Rabin
In-universe information
- Father: Don Craig
- Mother: Marlena Evans
- Siblings: Sami Brady; Eric Brady; Belle Black; Donna Temple Craig; Betsy Craig
- Grandfathers: Frank Evans
- Grandmothers: Amelia Craig; Martha Evans
- Uncles: Paolo Craig
- Aunts: Samantha Evans; Angela Craig
- Nephews: Will Horton; Johnny DiMera; Jude Brady
- Nieces: Allie Horton; Sydney DiMera; Claire Brady; Mackenzie Horton

Donald Craig Jr., known as "DJ" and "Donnie", is the firstborn child of Marlena Evans, whom she has with her first onscreen husband, Don Craig. Marlena and Don meet and fall in love in 1976, and they marry on March 5, 1979. DJ's birth is portrayed onscreen in the episode of February 26, 1980. Donnie is premature, and dies three months later from Sudden Infant Death Syndrome. The couple separate when they cannot come to terms with their baby's death.

Journalist Dorathy Gass called the storyline "shocking". She noted the value of soaps relaying issues and situations that occur in real-life and helping spreading awareness to audiences, but also said the storyline "may have been far too sensitive to bring up in the first place – leaving many fans devastated and heartbroken over the baby and entire situation".

== Jessica Blake Fallon ==
Jessica Blake Fallon
- Days of Our Lives character
- Portrayed by: Jean Bruce Scott
- Duration: 1980–82; 2012
- First appearance: April 30, 1980
- Last appearance: September 6, 2012
- Created by: Nina Laemmle
- Introduced by: Betty Corday and Al Rabin (1980); Ken Corday, Lisa de Cazotte and Greg Meng (2012)
In-universe information
- Other names: Angelique Horton (birth name); Angel and Angelica (alternate personalities)
- Occupation: Nurse
- Family: Horton
- Parents: Marie Horton; Alex Marshall
- Spouse: Joshua Fallon (1982–)
- Sons: Nick Fallon
- Grandparents: Tom Horton; Alice Horton
- Aunts and uncles: Harley Marshall; Tom Horton Jr.; Addie Horton; Mickey Horton; Bill Horton
- First cousins: Sandy Horton; Julie Williams; Steve Olson; Hope Williams Brady; Melissa Horton (adoptive); Sarah Horton (legal); Mike Horton; Jennifer Horton; Lucas Horton

Jessica Blake Fallon was portrayed by Jean Bruce Scott from April 30, 1980. Scott departed from the series on November 9, 1982. In August 2012, it was announced that Scott would return to the show after nearly a thirty-year absence, airing on August 31 until September 6, 2012.

The character of Jessica is the daughter of Marie Horton and Alex Marshall, granddaughter of Tom and Alice Horton and mother of recent character, Nick Fallon. As a result of abuse at the hands of her adoptive parents Jessica has dissociative identity disorder; one of her alters, Angelique, terrorized her mother while the other one, Angel, became involved with Jake Kositchek, who would later be known as the Salem Strangler, a serial killer. Angel and Jake ran off to Las Vegas to elope, but Jessica came to and called Alex. Marie and Alex rushed to Vegas and stopped the wedding just in the nick of time. Jessica fell apart and was hospitalized.

In 1982, after recovering from her mental health problems, Jessica broke off her relationship with Jake and became engaged to Joshua Fallon. Joshua and Jessica married and eventually left Salem. Offscreen, they had a son named Nick who came to Salem without his parents in 2006.

In 2012, Jessica came to Salem to see Nick, who was in prison for murder and was getting paroled. Nick was put on probation and chose to serve out his probation in Salem, so Jessica left Salem alone. In 2014, Jessica received horrible news that Nick had been murdered, and Julie Olson Williams delivered Nick's body to her and Joshua, so they could bury him. Nick's murderer, Gabi Hernandez, accepted a plea deal and Jessica agreed to it, not wanting the heartache of a trial.

== Renée DuMonde ==
Renée DuMonde
- Days of Our Lives character
- Portrayed by: Philece Sampler
- Duration: 1981–84
- First appearance: January 2, 1981
- Last appearance: April 12, 1984
- Created by: Michelle Poteet Lisanti and Gary Tomlin
- Introduced by: Betty Corday and Al Rabin
In-universe information
- Other names: Renée DiMera
- Occupation: Socialite
- Father: Stefano DiMera
- Mother: Lee DuMonde
- Half-brothers: André DiMera; Tony DiMera (legal); Benjy Hawk; Peter Blake (adoptive); EJ DiMera; Chad DiMera; Stefan DiMera; Jake Lambert
- Half-sisters: Megan Hathaway; Lexie Carver; Kristen DiMera (adoptive)
- Spouse: David Banning (1982–83); Alex Marshall (1983)
- Grandfathers: Santo DiMera
- Uncles: Ryan Brady
- Nephews: Dimitri Von Leuschner; Theo Carver; Steven Hawk; Johnny DiMera; Thomas DiMera
- Nieces: Grace Brady; Sydney DiMera; Charlotte DiMera; Rachel Black (adoptive)

Renée DuMonde (also DiMera) was portrayed by Philece Sampler from 1981 to 1983, with guest appearances in 1984. She is the daughter of Stefano DiMera and Lee DuMonde. Renée is notable for being the first member of the DiMera family to appear on the soap opera.

She first appeared in Salem, as the feisty younger sister of Lee DuMonde, the evil home wrecker of Doug & Julie Williams. While looked down upon by the Hortons for this reason, she was taken under the wings by Chris Kostichek and Marlena Evans. She eventually warmed to the Hortons through her friendship with Jessica Blake Fallon . Renée tried very hard to be liked, which often rubbed people the wrong way, including the Salem Strangler, who attempted to murder her twice. Renee survived to inform the police that she remembered his cologne - a cologne worn by Jake Kostichek. This helped, along with other clues, link the police to Jake. However, while the "Salem Strangler" was still on the loose, Renée was invited to stay at the DiMera Mansion for protection. It was during this time that Renée and Tony DiMera developed deep feelings for one another.

Renée and Tony began dating, and her sister Lee DuMonde warned her to stay away from him, as she knew they were half-siblings. However, she was afraid to tell Renée the truth, as she didn't want Renée in Stefano's care. In 1982, Tony proposed to Renée, who accepted. When Renée read Lee's diary she found out that Lee wasn't her sister but her mother, and that her father was Stefano DiMera. Thus, she became Renée DiMera. Renee quickly broke things off with Tony, not telling him the real reason in order to spare his feelings. Marlena offered counseling to Renée over the course of months helping the young girl cope. Especially after Lee just disappeared (in real life, actress Brenda Benet had taken her own life). Renée resented Lee for lying to her, and Lee couldn't bear that and left town, or so it was assumed.

Tony refused to let Renee go, and when she told him the truth he refused to believe they were siblings. Tony blamed Stefano for breaking them up. When Tony tried to leave town Stefano faked a heart attack. Tony later learned that he and Renee were in fact not related due to a confession by his mother Daphne DiMera that Stefano was not his true father, and had the blood tests to prove it. Renee had moved on and was married with David Banning when Tony learned the truth. Despite the evidence that they were not related, Renée refused to leave David.

However, the attraction between Renée & Tony couldn't be denied. Anna DiMera, who was now dating Tony, was very insecure, as she could sense Tony's true feelings were for Renee. David was suspicious and his accusations grew stronger and stronger. Julie was not happy with her daughter-in-law playing games with her son's heart. Renée was becoming more and more like her mother, Lee. She was beginning to show her DiMera colors - especially after going horseback riding and losing David's baby. This led to their divorce, and left David very broken and bitter to the point he wanted to kill her; Julie felt the same.

Renee continued to grow darker, as her DiMera blood took over. Now free of David, she set her sights once more on Tony, but he was still married to Anna - and she was now pregnant with Tony's child. Renee knew the only way to rid Anna from Tony, was to get rid of Anna, or her baby. Renee learned that Tony & Anna would be boating one afternoon, so she created a hole in the boat just above the water line. When Tony & Anna, and their servants got on the boat, the hole was under the water line and the boat sank. Tony saved Anna, but Anna miscarried. Anna told Tony of her suspicions that Renée was responsible once she learned of the hole in the boat, but Tony didn't want to believe it. In a scene famous for its turn of events, Anna summons Renee to her hospital room. Anna threatens to expose Renee, and gloats at having the upper hand. However, Renee has some juicy dirt on Anna - that Anna lied all about her past as in the "white slavery" ring. Anna claimed she was kidnapped because she couldn't swim after having fallen off the boat she had with Roman (her first husband). But Renee wisely pointed out that Anna had no troubles swimming that day the boat sank. She threatened Anna to keep her mouth shut or else she would expose her. It was just one of their many cat fights.

While he refused to believe Renée's involvement, Tony shunned Renée. Feeling lonely and rejected by most of Salem, Alex Marshall swooped in and romanced her. It was a whirlwind relationship and Renee & Alex were soon husband & wife. It was so fast, that no one knew. Alex wanted it that way - because he knew of a second will. One that left everything to Renee - all of Stefano's money, cars and the DiMera Mansion. When Renee discovered the second will, she wanted to throw a lavish party at the mansion to gloat about her newfound position, to which everyone in town was invited.

The party officially began when Renee entered wearing a black gown and addressed the room. They were all promised the "announcement of the year". First, she announced that she and Alex were married. Tony was visibly upset - he was shunning her. Marie Horton, Alex's former love, was upset too. Her next announcement was pointed towards Alex, she was divorcing him, having found out why he married her in the first place. Renee reserved judgement on the only two people who ever showed they cared - Chris and Marlena. Renee relished going off on Anna, who wanted her out of the mansion. And finally, she admitted her one true love was always and would always be Tony. She then ran upstairs in a fit of tears and rage.

A short while later, Tony went to check on Renee and they immediately fell into one another's arms. They talked and admitted their love after years of longing, and to the delight of their legion of fans, they had sex. Tony was jubilant and Renee was finally her happiest. Tony excused himself to grab some champagne to celebrate. Meanwhile, Alex confronted Renee and threatened her. From outside in the hallway, Anna eavesdropped. Alex exited and it was unclear if Anna was going to enter Renee's bedroom to confront her. Later, the maid Deliah screamed - there had been a murder. Roman investigated, and discovered Renee lying face down with a knife in her back.

David, Julie, Anna, Alex and Eugene Bradford, among others, were all suspects. It took months to reveal the truth, as Renee was killed over Labor Day weekend 1983. A series of similar murders took place over the months, and the "Salem Slasher" was on the loose. In April, viewers finally got their answer: André DiMera kidnapped Tony, who had gone to the wine cellar to grab champagne, and impersonated him, as he had gotten plastic surgery to look identical to him. When André returned to Renee, she very quickly realized something was off: his cologne was different, as were his hands, and while his voice was the same, his manner of phrasing was off. She announced she was going to get Roman, and André hastily pulled out a knife - laced with poison, and stabbed Renee, who died from the poison - not the knife wound. He then placed a Raven's feather in her hand, which linked the murder to Eugene once the connection was made. This was all filmed and viewers got to see Renee's actual murder. Clearly, this was not in Stefano's plans, as he loved his daughter Renee. He vowed André would die once he delivered all of Stefano's plans. André was known as the "Salem Slasher". In her honor, Stefano renamed his boat from "the Phoenix" to "Renée".

In 2022, Sarah Horton (Linsey Godfrey) is kidnapped by Renée's adoptive half-sister, Kristen DiMera (Stacey Haiduk). Sarah's mind is broken, and Kristen gave her books to read to occupy her. After reading Renée's diary, Sarah becomes convinced she is Renée. As a result of this, Sarah tries to come between Tony and Anna, with the goal of breaking them up in a bid to be with Tony once more. Her plan ultimately fails, and Sarah's true memories are eventually restored.

== Jake Kositchek ==
Jake Kositchek
- Days of Our Lives character
- Portrayed by: Jack Coleman
- Duration: 1981–82
- First appearance: June 10, 1981
- Last appearance: June 1, 1982
- Created by: Gary Tomlin and Michelle Poteet Lisanti
- Introduced by: Betty Corday and Al Rabin
In-universe information
- Other names: Salem Strangler (serial killer alias)
- Parents: Stan Kositchek
- Siblings: Chris Kositchek; Amy Kositchek

Jake Kositchek was played by Jack Coleman from June 10, 1981, until June 1, 1982.

Jake was the younger brother of Chris Kositchek (Josh Taylor), shortly after coming to town he fell in love with Angel, the alternate personality of Jessica Blake Fallon (Jean Bruce Scott). Jake was also briefly involved with Jessica's cousin, Hope Williams (Tammy Taylor). When Jake and "Angel" got engaged and planned to elope in Las Vegas, Jessica's parents Marie Horton (Lanna Saunders) and Alex Marshall (Quinn Redeker) learned of the elopement after Hope discovered Jessica's illness. Marie and Alex arrived in the nick of time to see Jessica reemerge and the wedding be interrupted. Jake was heartbroken after being rejected by Jessica who was going through psychiatric treatment under Marlena Evans (Deidre Hall). Jessica's rejection became the catalyst for Jake's mental breakdown, leading him to become the Salem Strangler, a serial killer who strangled many women to death including Mary Anderson (Melinda O. Fee), and Marlena's twin Samantha Evans (Andrea Hall), who was killed in a case of mistaken identity.

The Salem Strangler storyline was the very first serial killer storyline in the soap's history, and the supposed murder of Marlena at the hands of the killer resulted in one of the first fan campaigns ever.

== Eugene Bradford ==
Eugene Bradford
- Days of Our Lives character
- Portrayed by: John de Lancie
- Duration: 1982–86; 1989–90
- First appearance: January 18, 1982
- Last appearance: January 10, 1990
- Created by: Pat Falken Smith
- Introduced by: Betty Corday and Al Rabin (1982); Ken Corday and Shelley Curtis (1989)
In-universe information
- Other names: Bettina Lovelcraft
- Occupation: Inventor; Columnist
- Mother: Vanessa Van Kessler
- Spouse: Bonita Jean Bradford (19??–82); Trista Evans (1983); Marlena Evans (1984); Madeline Rutherford (1984); Calliope Jones (1985–)
- Grandfathers: Reginald Bradford
- First cousins: Letitia Bradford

Eugene Bradford was played by John de Lancie from 1982 to 1986 and again in 1989 to 1990. Also known as Gene and Euge, he went by the pseudonym Bettina Lovecraft while working as a Salem Today columnist.

Eugene was a distant relative of the DiMera family through a prior marriage, and referred to Tony DiMera as a cousin. Prior to marrying Calliope Jones on December 31, 1985, Eugene had been married four other times. Eugene's first two wives were murdered, while his third marriage to Marlena Evans was actually a cover-up (Eugene pretended to be married to Marlena when she was pregnant with Roman Brady's twins; at this time Roman was believed to be dead) and not legal. He later served as the namesake for Roman and Marlena's daughter Samantha Gene Brady.

Throughout the show, Eugene was portrayed as having psychic premonitions, and on a number of occasions they were useful in helping Salem Police and the ISA. In the last episode in which he appeared, he created a time machine and used the device. Upon activation, there was a big explosion and Eugene disappeared. He has not been seen on Days since. In 2006, Calliope returned as the fashion designer hired to make Mimi Lockhart's wedding dress, and she stated that she and Eugene remain happily married.

== Daphne DiMera ==
Daphne DiMera
- Days of Our Lives character
- Portrayed by: Madlyn Rhue
- Duration: 1982–84
- First appearance: October 25, 1982
- Last appearance: November 12, 1984
- Created by: Margaret DePriest; Sheri Anderson
- Introduced by: Betty Corday; Al Rabin
In-universe information
- Sisters: Philomena Alamain
- Spouse: Stefano DiMera (common law)
- Sons: Tony DiMera
- Nephews: John Black (adoptive); Lawrence Alamain

Daphne DiMera is a fictional character on the NBC soap opera Days of Our Lives. She was played by Madlyn Rhue from 1982 to 1984.

Daphne was the common law wife of Stefano DiMera, who fled from him while pregnant with her son, Antony. She raised Tony in Australia.

When Daphne learned that Tony was in love with Renée DuMonde, whom he believed to be his half-sister, she told him that he was not Stefano's son after all, but belonged to a man named Enrico. This led to a brief romantic reunion between Tony and Renée, but Renée was soon murdered. Years later, it would be discovered that Tony was actually Stefano's biological son (it was never revealed if Daphne believed he was Enrico's or if she lied). After numerous retcons (which included revealing John Black was Tony's half-brother via Daphne and that Tony had been replaced by his surgically altered identical cousin Andre for almost two decades), it was revealed that John was not Daphne's son after all but rather the son of Stefano's father Santo DiMera and Colleen Brady, the sister of Shawn Brady. The real Tony has since commented that Enrico the gardener is his actual father.

Daphne died in 1984 when a plane carrying a number of Salemites crashed in Haiti.

Daphne's real surname is unknown. She was always referred to as a DiMera, because her marriage was a common law marriage to Stefano. She is the aunt of Lawrence Alamain via her sister, Philomena.

== Ilya Petrov ==
Ilya Petrov
- Portrayed by: Kai Wulff (1983–91); Mark Laursen (2016)
- Duration: 1983–85; 1991; 2016
- First appearance: February 18, 1983
- Last appearance: March 8, 2016
- Created by: Margaret DePriest and Sheri Anderson
- Introduced by: Betty Corday and Al Rabin (1983); Ken Corday and Al Rabin (1991); Ken Corday, Albert Alarr and Greg Meng (2016)
In-universe information
- Occupation: Henchman; Teacher; Assassin

Ilya Petrov was portrayed by Kai Wulff from 1983 to 1986 and for a few episodes in 1991. With the exception of Bart and Rolf, Petrov is the most well known henchman of Stefano. In comparison to Bart, he mostly succeeded and completed his assignments. Petrov assisted Stefano in a few of his many schemes. When Stefano kidnapped Marlena Evans & Liz Chandler in early 1983, Petrov was the one who kept an eye of them so they wouldn't escape. He then had small assignments in Stefano's devilish Salem Slasher plot. When Stefano had to escape after some failures of both himself and André DiMera, Petrov was already in the car. But Roman and Abe were ready as well and chased them. After struggling to shake off the police, and a drunk Alex Marshall caused some problem, the car drove off a bridge and fell down into a river. Alex was found but neither Petrov or Stefano.

A few months later, Stefano was seen very much alive looking for the three prisms, and soon Petrov was seen taking orders from Stefano. He kidnapped Hope Williams for Stefano in an attempt to faster lure Roman into Stefano's trap. He also got instructions from Stefano on how to activate the volcano. After locking up a noisy Shane Donovan, he fulfilled his orders and activated the volcano successfully.

In late 1985-early 1986, Petrov was seen in Miami, representing Stefano in a three-way wager with Victor Kiriakis and corrupt ISA chief George Nickerson, with the stakes being "the Purse (provided by Victor, which turned out to be clues to the locations of (1) a set of stolen U.S. Treasury engravings which were hidden in 1979 in Stockholm, and (2) a priceless Mayan treasure that could only be located during a specific astronomical event in 1991), The Power (provided by the ISA, a codebook with information that ostensibly gave the holder total immunity from every intelligence and law enforcement network in the world), and the Pawn (a "most formidable and dangerous man" controlled by Stefano, at the time believed to be the missing-and-presumed-dead Roman Brady, but later retconned into the separate character of John Black)."

In 2015, John Black embarked on an ISA-assisted quest to unravel the mysteries of his heretofore unknown past, including his parentage, once and for all. This coincided with the show's 50th anniversary. An important scene showed John viewing an ISA computer file on Petrov, which expanded his story to reveal that he was a Cold War-era Soviet agent who defected to the West, and became at one point a teacher at a private school in Vermont called Winterthorne around the time he became one of Stefano's henchmen. Winterthorne was later revealed to be a "front" for a secret training facility for assassins, run by a Far Eastern organization called the Phantom Alliance, which turned out to have been founded in the 1950s by John's real father, Timothy Robecheaux aka "Yo Ling". Petrov was revealed to have been Yo Ling's accomplice, and temporarily "defected" to Stefano's organization. In this storyline, it was suggested that Petrov eventually returned to the Phantom Alliance's fold.

== Trista Evans Bradford ==
Trista Evans Bradford
- Days of Our Lives character
- Portrayed by: Barbara Crampton
- Duration: 1983–84
- First appearance: March 4, 1983
- Last appearance: March 9, 1984
- Created by: Margaret DePriest and Sheri Anderson
- Introduced by: Betty Corday and Al Rabin
In-universe information
- Occupation: Nurse
- Parents: Robert Evans; Barbara Talmadge
- Spouse: Eugene Bradford (1983)
- Aunts and uncles: Frank Evans
- First cousins: Marlena Evans; Samantha Evans

Trista Evans Bradford was played by Barbara Crampton beginning March 4, 1983. Trista came to Salem as the cousin of Dr. Marlena Evans and took up employment at the hospital as a candy striper. Trista was heavily featured in a mystery surrounding her mother's death, an old clock, a gun hidden inside and Alex Marshall. Trista was very beautiful and charming and quickly caught on with viewers.

Once that mystery was resolved, Trista found herself being courted by the very eccentric yet extremely lovable Eugene Bradford, whom her cousin Marlena just adored. After an adorable & short courtship, Eugene proposed to Trista and the two were married before honeymooning in Haiti, where Eugene's family had ties and where he felt he could get clues to the series of murders happening in Salem (starting with Renee DiMera's). Originally, the Salem Slasher mystery was briefly called The Bradford Curse, as Eugene felt those he had interactions with ended up a victim and dying (Renee bumped into him at her party, and was later found murdered, his Aunt Leticia was murdered on-camera by Eugene, but it was Andre DiMera disguised as Eugene)...and Trista fell to the same fate. They had only just found one another and gotten married when Eugene returned home to find his beloved slain on the floor with a knife in her back and a raven feather in her hand (same M.O. as the other victim's). Crampton exited DAYS after seven months on October 24, 1983.

Crampton later returned as Trista in flashbacks from February 14 to March 9, 1984. During this return, in flashbacks of Trista working at the hospital, it was revealed that Trista had discovered fallacies in the death reports of Stefano DiMera. Once it got back to him, he ordered her death via Andre aka the Salem Slasher.

== Pete Jannings ==
Pete Jannings
- Days of Our Lives character
- Portrayed by: Michael Leon
- Duration: 1983–1986
- First appearance: July 5, 1983
- Last appearance: December 23, 1986
- Created by: Margaret DePriest and Sheri Anderson
- Introduced by: Betty Corday and Al Rabin

Pete Jannings is a fictional character on the NBC daytime television soap opera Days of Our Lives. The character was played by Michael Leon from July 5, 1983, to December 23, 1986.

Pete was a Vipers gang member who came to Salem and was connected to the attempted rapes of Gwen Davies and Sandy Horton. Later that same night after Melissa Horton (Lisa Trusel) caught Pete stealing food from Shenanigans, he kidnapped her with the intent to leave Salem, but a snow storm stranded them at the old Horton farm. Pete confided many things to Melissa and she sympathized with her kidnapper. When the police arrived, Pete was arrested. Melissa did not press charges and Pete was soon released. Eventually, Pete and Melissa started secretly dating, During a gang rumble, Pete accidentally shot Melissa's adoptive father, Mickey Horton, (John Clarke) causing Pete to run from the law and abruptly flee Salem. Pete found Melissa at a summer camp outside of Salem and they began dating again. They returned to Salem and their relationship became public knowledge, Eventually, On February 14, Valentine's Day, in a double ceremony with Melissa's adoptive patents, Mickey and Maggie Horton (John Clarke and Suzanne Rogers), Pete and Melissa were married. Unfortunately, Melissa's affair with Lars Englund brought an end to their marriage and Pete left Salem,

== Larry Welch ==
Larry Welch
- Days of Our Lives character
- Portrayed by: Andrew Masset
- Duration: 1983–85; 2002–03; 2016; 2022
- First appearance: July 11, 1983
- Last appearance: July 13, 2022
- Created by: Margaret DePriest and Sheri Anderson
- Introduced by: Betty Corday and Al Rabin (1983); Ken Corday and Stephen Wyman (2002); Ken Corday, Albert Alarr and Greg Meng (2016)
- Spin-off appearances: Days of Our Lives: Beyond Salem (2022)
In-universe information
- Occupation: District Attorney
- Father: Victor Chorvat
- Adoptive parents: Jim Welch; Geraldine Welch
- Siblings: Ben Welch (adoptive)
- Spouse: Cynthia Welch (pre–1983); Hope Williams Brady (1984–85)

Larry Welch, played by Andrew Hyatt Masset from July 11 to October 21, 1983, on a recurring status and November 1, 1983, to December 9, 1985, and again from October 15, 2002, to March 11, 2003, on contract status, then back to recurring from June 10 to July 23, 2003, and finally a guest appearance on June 8, 2016, as well as a guest appearance in the second season of Days of Our Lives: Beyond Salem on July 13, 2022.

Larry Welch was a constant obstacle in Bo and Hope's supercouple love story. Larry blackmailed Hope into marrying him but on the day of the wedding Bo rode in on his motorcycle and kidnapped Hope from the wedding. In 1985, Larry killed Stefano's daughter, Megan, and dumped her body in a hot tub; Hope was the prime suspect. Victor Kiriakis learned the truth and forced Larry to take the fall for the crime syndicate that he was running.

Larry returned in 2002 when he again kidnapped Hope in an attempt to get his revenge on her, Bo and Victor. He was presumed dead after a prison break, but in reality, was helping Nicole in her plans to murder Victor. Larry was hit and killed by a car in early 2003.

He returns in Days of Our Lives: Beyond Salem as a judge. When Bo wants permission to go to Earth to save Hope, it is up to Larry to decide whether or not permission is granted.

== Tess Jannings ==
Tess Jannings
- Days of Our Lives character
- Portrayed by: Melonie Mazman
- Duration: 1984
- First appearance: February 1, 1984
- Last appearance: November 20, 1984
- Created by: Margaret DePriest and Sheri Anderson
- Introduced by: Betty Corday and Al Rabin

Tess Jannings is a fictional character on the NBC daytime soap opera Days of Our Lives. The character was played by Melonie Mazman from February 1, 1984, to November 20, 1984.

Tess comes to Salem after a five-year absence to keep her brother Pete out of trouble with a local gang, The Vipers. Chris Kositchek later made attempts to pursue her romantically and she later moved in with him as his housekeeper. She soon was smitten but soon began receiving mysterious messages revealed to be her abusive husband Barry Reid, who had just got out of jail and had beaten and raped her for leaving him. After Chris discovers this, he severely beats Barry. She leaves Chris after he forces her to choose between him and Barry. She soon divorces Barry upon leaving town.

== Megan Hathaway DiMera ==
Megan Hathaway DiMera
- Days of our Lives character
- Portrayed by: Miranda Wilson
- Duration: 1984–1985; 2022–2023
- First appearance: June 20, 1984
- Last appearance: July 6, 2023
- Created by: Margaret DePriest and Sheri Anderson
- Introduced by: Betty Corday and Al Rabin (1984); Albert Alarr and Ken Corday (2023)
- Spin-off appearances: Days of Our Lives: Beyond Salem (2022)
In-universe information
- Family: DiMera
- Father: Stefano DiMera
- Adoptive father: Maxwell Hathaway
- Half-brothers: André DiMera; Tony DiMera (legal); Benjy Hawk; Peter Blake (adoptive); EJ DiMera; Chad DiMera; Stefan DiMera; Jake Lambert
- Half-sisters: Renée DuMonde; Lexie Carver; Kristen DiMera (adoptive)
- Spouse: Oskar Von Leuschner
- Sons: Dimitri Von Leuschner
- Grandparents: Santo DiMera
- Uncles: Ryan Brady
- Nieces and nephews: Theo Carver; Steven Hawk; Johnny DiMera; Sydney DiMera; Grace Brady; Thomas DiMera; Charlotte DiMera; Rachel Black (adoptive)

Megan Hathaway DiMera is a fictional character from the soap opera, Days of Our Lives. She is played by Cheryl-Ann Wilson (now known as Miranda Wilson) from 1984 to 1985, and since 2023. Wilson also played the role in 2022 in Days of Our Lives: Beyond Salem.

Megan comes to Salem in 1984 with her adopted father Maxwell Hathaway, though she is secretly the daughter of Stefano DiMera. Megan had been the high school love of Bo Brady who so deeply broke his heart that he was unable to allow himself to fully commit to Hope Brady. Megan thought Bo had left her, never answered her letters and broke her heart, as completely as he thought she had broken his. Bo thought Megan no longer loved him because she never answered any letter or spoke to her when he called. When they discover it was her mother who interfered to keep them apart, she became obsessed with winning him back and would stop at nothing in order to have him. Megan tells Bo that she discovered she was pregnant with his child, after he left town. She tells him that she gave the child up for adoption after her letters and pleas went unanswered, and because her mother convinced her it was the best thing to do in the circumstances. Bo initially softens towards her when he realizes what she must've gone through. However, he begins to doubt her when it's revealed that Roman Brady, his brother, had seen Megan in an abortion clinic.

Throughout 1984, Megan becomes more and more involved with collecting 3 Prisms for her father Stefano DiMera. It's revealed that Stefano is suffering from an inoperable brain tumor and the Prisms are the only way to restore his health. Meanwhile, Bo is keen to help Megan & recover their adopted child, and the search leads them to New Orleans, where it turns out, Megan has conspired to have Diane killed, steal her child, and set up dummy adoptive parents who then allow Megan and Bo to have 'their' child back. Bo saves Diane from the attempted murder and goes along with Megan's deception, in order to stay close to her and get to Stefano.

Andre DiMera shows up in town and kills Max Hathaway. When he calls Megan in to see him, she's initially dismissive, knowing that Stefano always preferred her when they were kids. She was Stefano's Golden Girl, and Andre was always jealous. However, once he reveals that Max is dead it puts a bit of fear into Megan's cocky attitude. Many cat fights occur between Megan and Hope while Megan has Bo close by her side because of 'their child,' Zachary. After the plane crash on the deserted island, which brings Bo and Hope closer than ever to each other, Hope exposes, on a live news report, that her marriage to Larry was a sham, ruining Larry's career and destroying a valuable lackie for the Cartel that Megan was running for Stefano.

In 1985, Megan plots to kill Hope by electrocuting her in a hot tub at Chris' health club, The Body Connection. Megan's plan backfires when she overhears Larry Welch talking to a Russian contact about the 3 prisms Larry's father had invented. When Megan comes out and confronts Larry, they fight. Megan threatens to expose the plot that Larry is entangled with: a plot to blow up all of Salem, killing Stefano in the process. Larry explodes at Megan's tirade and ends up killing her unintentionally. Larry then discovers the electronic drawing and works out the fact they are for rewiring the hot tub to electrocute. Larry, in a panic, picks up Megan's lifeless body and dumps her body in the hot tub, then returns to the closet and, following the diagram, 'electrocutes' her. Megan is then found by Hope, who becomes the prime suspect in her murder.

In Days of Our Lives: Beyond Salem, Megan is revealed to be alive and living in Caracas, Venezuela, in the second season of Beyond Salem. Stefano had her cryogenically frozen until treatment for her injuries could be healed. She spent all her time in Caracas planning to retrieve the prisms once more. With help from Harris Michaels, Thomas Banks (Susan Banks' brother), and both John and Steve through brainwashing, Megan retrieved all three which she used to bring Bo Brady back to life and cure his brain tumor.

However, she made him a prisoner when he asked about Hope and had Dr. Rolf brainwash him into wanting nothing to do with Hope. She had him then go to the DiMera mansion to steal the orchid that made Kayla, Marlena and Kate Roberts sick. She believed that Rolf could make a serum from the plant to restore hers and Bo's youth so that she could recapture the spark they had as teenagers and start over. When the three women died, she had their bodies replaced with duplicates and ashes of a goat in Kate's urn. While the three were in cryo-suspension, she had them cured of their sickness, but only to use them as test subjects for Rolf's new serum. She is later captured after Bo goes rogue and abandons her along with John and Steve finding her compound after Harris Michaels remembers where it is. She manages to make a deal that has her transferred to Stateville Prison in Salem and remain there when she confirms that Bo is alive and was under her control.

When Dimitri, her son, manages to get her immunity, she returns to the DiMera mansion where she asserts herself as a member of family as well as confirming to Kristen that she has big plans beyond Salem and running the family business. During her scheming, she holds EJ and Kristen and decides to brainwash Harris again, with help from Li Shin and Rolf. However, during the assassination attempt, Megan is shot instead. While at the hospital, she escapes once again with Rolf's help.

== Calliope Jones Bradford ==
Calliope Jones Bradford
- Days of Our Lives character
- Portrayed by: Arleen Sorkin
- Duration: 1984–90; 1992; 2001; 2006; 2010
- First appearance: June 29, 1984
- Last appearance: May 14, 2010
- Created by: Margaret DePriest and Sheri Anderson
- Introduced by: Betty Corday and Al Rabin
In-universe information
- Husband: Eugene Bradford (1985–)

Calliope Jones Bradford was played by Arleen Sorkin from 1984 to 1990, 1992, 2001, 2006, and 2010.

Calliope came to Salem in 1984. She was employed in Liz Curtis's clothing business and her first scenes featured her making a dress for Anna DiMera. One of her trademarks was her endless collections of hats, which were very creative and sometimes very outlandish. However, Calliope soon came to possess a diamond necklace which was originally owned by Daphne DiMera. She claimed it as her own, but didn't realize that Stefano DiMera was after it, for it contained one of three prisms he was after. Her white lie unknowingly thrust her into a major storyline.

Calliope went on to co-host a daytime talk show with Jennifer Horton-Deveraux. The show was a success, but Calliope would eventually turn over the show to Jennifer and leave town. However, since her departure in 1990, Calliope has visited Salem several times.

In 2006, Calliope returned to town as a successful wedding planner. Although hired to plan her good friend Marlena's wedding to Alex North, she was also able to help Shawn-Douglas Brady and Mimi Lockhart with theirs, despite normally being booked two years in advance. Still eccentric, Calliope butted heads with Mimi's mother Bonnie Lockhart, a fellow eccentric, but with a different wild taste. During her trip, Calliope also commented Eugene was doing just fine and she was now living in New York City.

Calliope briefly returned in 2010, when she was hired by Rafe Hernandez to collect evidence to prove that Anna DiMera was hired by EJ to kidnap Sami and EJ's daughter Sydney DiMera.

== Shane Donovan ==
Shane Donovan
- Days of Our Lives character
- Portrayed by: Charles Shaughnessy (1984–2025); Joseph Mascolo (2017)
- Duration: 1984–1992; 2002; 2010; 2012–2013; 2016–2017; 2021; 2023; 2025
- First appearance: July 31, 1984
- Last appearance: June 24, 2025
- Created by: Margaret DePriest; Sheri Anderson
- Introduced by: Betty Corday and Al Rabin
- Spin-off appearances: Days of Our Lives: Beyond Salem (2021)
In-universe information
- Other names: Stefano DiMera (2017)
- Occupation: Retired ISA agent
- Parents: Andrew Donovan II; Margaret Donovan
- Siblings: Drew Donovan
- Spouse: Emma Donovan (1984–85); Kimberly Brady (1987–90, 2010–)
- Children: Eve Donovan; Andrew Donovan; Theresa Donovan
- Grandchildren: Paige Larson; Tate Black
- Grandparents: Andrew Donovan I

Shane Donovan is an agent of the ISA and husband to Kimberly Brady Donovan. Donovan and Brady were a supercouple.

In 1984, Shane came to Salem to keep an eye on Stefano DiMera's illegal dealings. He posed as Larry Welch's butler, and eventually learned of Stefano's acquisitions of two of three rare prisms designed by Larry's father. Shane teamed up with Bo, and the two intended on taking Stefano down. Later that year Shane learned that Stefano was about to acquire the third and final prism through a Russian ice skating troupe that came to town. Hope and Bo got the prism from the troupe, but after a long chase with Stefano's men the prism ended up embedded in the ice rink.

Shane returns to Salem briefly in the winter of 2002 when Hope was kidnapped by Larry Welch. Shane later returns in 2010 and was revealed to have been held prisoner in a South American prison while on assignment with the ISA (International Security Alliance). Shane escaped with the help of Rafe and both returned to Salem in time for Alice Horton's funeral. Shane reconnected with Kimberly, who was in town for Alice's memorial service, and admitted that he wanted his future with her and the family and not with the ISA. Shane and Kimberly reunited and moved to LA to be together as a family.

In July 2013, Jeannie appeared in Salem, having dropped the name and instead uses her middle name, Theresa. She works at the hospital as Jennifer Horton's assistant and later in Human Resources as the assistant to Anne Milbauer. In late 2016, Shane, apparently back in the ISA, returned to warn Theresa that her ex-boyfriend, a Mexican drug cartel boss, was back in town and wanting to reunite with her. The man was apparently so powerful that even Victor Kiriakis is afraid to cross him. Theresa relented and staged her disappearance to return to Mexico with him to protect her friends and family, who the man had threatened. In January 2017, agent Shane was back in town to inform the Salem gang that Stefano DiMera, for whose murder Hope Brady was serving a life sentence, was actually seen alive and well in Prague orchestrating a series of arms deals. Shane's mysterious demeanor during these appearances suggest more to the story than he was letting on. This proved to be true when it was revealed that Shane and brother-in-law Steve Johnson engineered the whole affair, and that Shane himself was impersonating Stefano, to "prove" that Stefano was alive and thereby secure Hope's freedom.

Shane appeared in the first season of Days of Our Lives: Beyond Salem where he tasked John Black to find gemstones belonging to an artifact called the Alamainian Peacock, an item that Hope Brady stole when she was brainwashed by Stefano DiMera to be Princess Gina. During the mission, Shane is knocked unconscious by his brother Drew who impersonates him to retrieve the stones for his plans to destroy Salem and other cities. Ben Weston and Ciara Brady find him and untie him. Before he leaves, Shane makes it clear to Ben he doesn't think of him as innocent due to him killing his granddaughter Paige and other women. After Drew and his partner, Dimitri von Leuschner, are arrested, Shane returns to the ISA, where he ultimately becomes the agency's director. He has since made sporadic appearance on the show such as handling an investigation into Victor's plane crash and discovering the briefcase containing his will, and later helps locate John when he goes missing on an ISA mission and attended his funeral in June 2025.

== Ivy Jannings ==
Ivy Selejko Jannings
- Days of Our Lives character
- Portrayed by: Holly Gagnier
- Duration: 1985–87
- First appearance: January 17, 1985
- Last appearance: January 9, 1987
- Created by: Margaret DePriest and Sheri Anderson
- Introduced by: Betty Corday and Al Rabin
In-universe information
- Parents: Paul Selejko †
- Siblings: Speed Selejko

Ivy Selejko Jannings is a fictional character on the American daytime television soap opera Days of Our Lives. The character was played by Holly Gagnier from January 17, 1985, until January 9, 1987.

== Savannah Wilder ==
Savannah Wilder is a fictional character on the NBC daytime soap opera Days of Our Lives, played by Shannon Tweed from April 26, 1985, to December 4, 1986.

Savannah was a crime boss who used a pornography business as a cover for a heroin smuggling operation that was supported by Victor Kiriakis. It was foiled by Bo Brady and Abe's brother Theo.

Savannah became romantically involved with Chris Kositchek, and continued her heroin business. He found out and helped send her to prison. After being released from prison, Savannah attempted to reform to be with Chris, but after discovered she hired a man to attack Marlena so she could look like a hero he dumped her again. Some time later, she left Salem.

In Days of Our Lives: Beyond Salem, she is briefly mentioned. She and Chris ended up eventually reconnecting, getting married, and running a health club.

== Theo Carver ==
Theo Carver
- Days of Our Lives character
- Portrayed by: Rusty Cundieff
- Duration: 1985
- First appearance: May 10, 1985
- Last appearance: October 16, 1985
- Created by: Sheri Anderson, Thom Racina, and Leah Laiman
- Introduced by: Betty Corday and Al Rabin
In-universe information
- Other names: Theodore Carver
- Occupation: Record producer
- Family: Carver
- Father: Benjamin Carver
- Mother: Rita Carver
- Brothers: Abe Carver; Jonah Carver
- Sisters: Karen Carver
- Sons: Jett Carver
- Nephews: Brandon Walker; Theo Carver
- Nieces: Lani Price (adoptive)

Theo Carver, played by Rusty Cundieff, is introduced in 1985 as the younger brother of established character, Abe Carver (James Reynolds). Cundieff first appeared on May 10, 1985. Cundieff vacated the role when Theo was killed off on October 16, 1985.

Theo visits Abe as he is being accused of stealing Savannah Wilder's (Shannon Tweed) purse in 1985. Theo insist that it's just a misunderstanding, even though he and Savannah clearly have history. Theo wants money so he can travel to England to see his friend Bo Brady (Peter Reckell) get married. However, Abe refuses to give him any money until Theo admits what he really needs it for. Theo finds his way to London and breaks Bo and his new wife Hope (Kristian Alfonso) out of jail. On the flight back home, Theo ask for Bo helps to find who was responsible for his best friend's murder, which was connected to record industry. Due to Bo's "rockstar" image, Theo believes he would the perfect cover. Bo isn't interested, as he wants to focus on Hope. However, Theo has already planted story's in the press about Bo's budding music career and the newly weds are mobbed by paparazzi as they return. Theo finally tells Bo that it was their old friend Danny Grant (Roger Aaron Brown) that was murdered. According to Theo, Danny had been hiding something and was carrying a large amount of cash when he was killed. Bo agrees to help, but only if they do it his way, which means they abandon the "rock star" story. Next, they set out to obtain break into Shannon's video studio during the juvenile diabetes benefit concert. However, they get caught and Theo talks his way out of is by convincing Savannah to use Bo in one of her videos. They later stage a fight for Savannah and several executives and Bo insist they use Danny Grant as the technician instead. Savannah claims she doesn't know who Danny is. While she is obviously alarmed, she keeps her cool in front of Bo and Theo.

== Robin Jacobs ==
Robin Jacobs
- Days of Our Lives character
- Portrayed by: Derya Ruggles
- Duration: 1986–87, 1989
- First appearance: January 9, 1986
- Last appearance: September 27, 1989
- Created by: Sheri Anderson, Thom Racina and Leah Laiman
- Introduced by: Betty Corday and Al Rabin (1986); Ken Corday and Shelley Curtis (1989)
In-universe information
- Occupation: Surgeon
- Father: Eli Jacobs
- Husband: Mitch Kaufman (1986)
- Sons: Jeremy Horton
- Aunts and uncles: Robin Jacobs; Robert LeCleir
- First cousins: Douglas LeCleir

Robin Jacobs is a fictional character from NBC's daytime drama, Days of Our Lives. She was portrayed by Derya Ruggles from 1986 to 1987 and briefly in 1989.

Robin was a surgeon at University Hospital in Salem. She fell in love with Mike Horton, but they couldn't be together because she was Jewish. She married Mitch Kaufman, a Jew, but after finding out she was carrying Mike's child, she ended the marriage. In 1987, she left town when she thought Mike would never convert to Judaism. In 1989, she returned for a few days to introduce Mike to his son, Jeremy.

== Andrew Donovan ==
Andrew Donovan
- Days of Our Lives character
- Portrayed by: Robert Eliot Canko (1986–1988); Brandon Ambar (1988–1989); Sky Rumph (1989); Justin Page (1989–1990); Bradley Pierce (1990–1991); Brian Davila (1991–1992); uncredited actor (1996–1997); Colton Little (2022–present)
- Duration: 1986–1992; 1996–1997; 2022–present
- First appearance: May 16, 1986
- Last appearance: March 19, 2026
- Created by: Sheri Anderson, Thom Racina and Leah Laiman
- Introduced by: Betty Corday, Ken Corday and Al Rabin
- Spin-off appearances: Days of Our Lives: Beyond Salem (2022)
In-universe information
- Other names: Teddy Stewart; Andrew Shawn Donovan IV
- Occupation: ISA Agent
- Family: Brady
- Parents: Shane Donovan; Kimberly Brady
- Sisters: Theresa Donovan
- Half-sisters: Eve Donovan
- Spouse: Paul Narita (m. 2025)
- Grandparents: Andrew Donovan II; Margaret Donovan; Shawn Brady; Caroline Brady
- Aunts and uncles: Drew Donovan; Roman Brady; Kayla Brady; Frankie Brady (adoptive); Max Brady (adoptive); Bo Brady; Hope Williams Brady
- Nieces and nephews: Paige Larson; Tate Black
- First cousins: Carrie Brady; Sami Brady; Eric Brady; Rex Brady; Cassie Brady; Stephanie Johnson; Joey Johnson; Shawn-Douglas Brady; Chelsea Brady; Zack Brady; Ciara Brady

Andrew Donovan was portrayed by several child actors including Bradley Pierce, later known for his role in movies such as Jumanji and Beauty and the Beast, until the character left the series in 1992, with further guest appearances in both 1996 and 1997. Andrew is the eldest son of supercouple Shane Donovan and Kimberly Brady (Charles Shaughnessy and, most prominently, Patsy Pease).

When he was born, they believed he was Victor's child because Kimberly had had sex with Victor to secure Shane's freedom, and it wasn't until long after the baby was born that they learned the truth. Later, he was kidnapped by Emma Marshall, and adopted by Paul and Barbara Stewart. Andrew was eventually reunited with his real mother.

Now an openly gay adult, Andrew Donovan appeared in the second season of Days of Our Lives: Beyond Salem. He is revealed to be an ISA Agent and was tasked with finding Steve Johnson and John Black after they were kidnapped. John's son Paul Narita assists him and the two begin to connect. After learning Megan Hathaway kidnapped and brainwashed them to do her bidding, Steve is subdued and the two find John and rescue him from Megan's clutches. Once the case is solved, Andrew returns to Washington D.C. and kisses Paul goodbye.

Eventually, Andrew and Paul reconnect during his investigation on Megan and during the assignment, he is captured by henchmen of Dimitri Von Leuschner, Megan's son, and is used as a bargaining chip for his, Megan's and later Kristen DiMera's immunity for their crimes. He is freed and he and Paul embrace. As time passes, the two become engaged and they marry in Salem as part of honor Paul's father, John Black, who died before he could see it happen.

When Dimitri Von Leuschner and Leo Stark are in Alamainia looking for clues to prove Dimitri was held captive, Andrew rescues them from an assassin.

== Tamara Price ==
Tamara Price
- Days of Our Lives character
- Portrayed by: Marilyn McCoo
- Duration: 1986–1987, 2019–2020
- First appearance: August 21, 1986
- Last appearance: July 2, 2020
- Created by: Sheri Anderson, Thom Racina and Leah Laiman
- Introduced by: Betty Corday, Ken Corday and Al Rabin
In-universe information
- Occupation: Singer
- Family: Price family
- Mother: Olivia Price
- Sisters: Paulina Price
- Adoptive daughters: Lani Price
- Grandsons: David Grant; Carver Grant
- Granddaughters: Jules Grant
- Nieces: Lani Price; Chanel Dupree

Tamara Price, portrayed by The 5th Dimension singer Marilyn McCoo, was introduced in August 1986 as the college roommate of Marlena Evans (Deidre Hall).

Tamara surprises Marlena as she is set to remarry Roman Brady (Drake Hogestyn). Tamara initially clashes with Roman's best friend Abe Carver (James Reynolds) as she cut him off in traffic rushing to the ceremony. Tamara is running from Coleman, a mysterious man from her past. Tamara gets a gig singing at Blondie's which upsets Liz Chandler's (Gloria Loring) as she is out of a job. Despite their rocky start, Abe and Tamara begin dating. However, it becomes obvious Tamara is keeping something from him. She is horrified when Coleman confronts her and promises to go "legit" if she returns to him. However, Coleman does not want to leave his wife. Abe looks into Coleman's background when Tamara suddenly announces that they have reunited. She leaves town in May 1987.

McCoo's casting was first announced in the summer of 1986. McCoo revealed to Jet that she would also be singing on the show. A year and a half before debut, McCoo's publicist arranged a meeting with the casting director. "She asked if I'd consider performing in a soap opera I said absolutely." McCoo hoped her role as Tamara would "make people take me more serious as an actress." McCoo said of her experience, "Working on a soap is on-the-job training. It's some of the toughest work you do. Because the demands are greater, I feel if I can cut it on a soap, everything else is easy." However, she admitted that scheduling typically was not a problem because the role was recurring. "Once it got a little crazy, but you deal with it" she said. According to Days the show's publicist Bud Tenarani, Tamara, described as an "entertainer", comes to Salem to "restructure her life and basically to settle down." Tamara initially has an "adversarial relationship" with Abe, they soften toward each other as time passes.

In 2015, Sal Stowers joined the cast as Abe and Tamara's daughter, Lani. It is revealed that Tamara gave birth to Lani after she left town in 1987 and raised the girl in Miami. Tamara gets married and raises Lani with her husband. In the summer of 2018, Soap Opera Digest reported that Tamara was deceased. However, in 2019 Lani reveals that Tamara is alive and living in Miami.

On October 19, 2019, it was announced that McCoo would reprise beginning November 1, 2019. The series also cast McCoo's real life husband, Billy Davis Jr. in a guest role. Tamara returns to witness Lani's marriage to Eli Grant (Lamon Archey). Head writer Ron Carlivati said of the return: "Anytime we do a wedding, you want it to be as big and festive as possible. Obviously, your mind goes to the family and friends, and given our lovely limitations of daytime, we do what we can. And so one person that we really did want was Tamara Price." While some sources had reported the character's death, Carlivati turned to the writing team to research if Tamara's death had ever been acknowledged onscreen. Once they confirmed Tamara was alive, "We reached out," and despite her busy touring schedule, "it worked out." Not only would Tamara be in attendance, Carlivati revealed that Tamara was set to sing at the wedding. The actress returned again when Lani finally marries Eli in the summer of 2020. In 2021, actress Jackée Harry joined the cast as Tamara's sister, Paulina. On July 22, 2021, Marla Gibbs was cast in the role of Olivia Price, Paulina and Tamara's mother.

== Orpheus ==
Orpheus
- Days of Our Lives character
- Portrayed by: George DelHoyo
- Duration: 1986–87, 2016, 2020–2023, 2025
- First appearance: October 20, 1986
- Last appearance: April 17, 2025
- Created by: Sheri Anderson, Thom Racina, Leah Laiman
- Introduced by: Betty Corday, Ken Corday and Al Rabin (1986); Ken Corday, Albert Alarr and Greg Meng (2020)
In-universe information
- Other names: Milo Harp
- Occupation: Terrorist
- Wife: Rebecca
- Children: Christian Maddox; Zoey Burge
- Grandsons: Unnamed grandson (thru Zoey); David Ridgeway; Shawn Christian Spears

Orpheus is the name of a former ISA agent who became a criminal mastermind that rivaled closely to Stefano DiMera and is considered one of the show's most dangerous villains.

In 1979, he and his partner Roman Brady were out on a mission against the KGB when things went wrong. Orpheus's wife, Rebecca, was caught in the crossfires of an ambush. Roman had accidentally shot and killed Rebecca. Orpheus then resigned from the ISA and started planning his revenge on Roman for what he felt was the deliberate, cold-blooded killing by Roman of his wife and leaving his children motherless.

In 1986, he began his revenge on Roman, who in reality was John Black believing himself to be Roman. Orpheus kidnaps Marlena Evans to force "Roman" into following their orders, and held her hostage in order for "Roman" to suffer the way he did when he lost his own wife. Marlena is rescued but not without injury. Later, Orpheus arrives in Salem and kidnapped Kayla Brady and held her hostage until she was saved by Steve Johnson and his associates, and he blew up "Roman's house with Marlena in it to make it look like Marlena was dead, when in fact, Orpheus had kidnapped again and taken her to his secret hideaway in Europe. Orpheus made Marlena play mother to his children and in exchange he promised her that he would not harm "Roman", Carrie or the twins; Eric and Sami. Every move, every step, played out in great detail without any mistake. He foiled "Roman" time and time again. Eventually, "Roman" found the island hideaway, shot and killed Orpheus but was too late to save Marlena who apparently died in a plane crash on the island right in front of his eyes.

Orpheus, revealed to be alive and in prison, resurfaced in 2016 and learned Marlena was alive and that "Roman" was John. Together with Clyde Weston and Xander Cook, Orpheus escaped from prison and wreaked havoc on Salem. First, he showed up at the Kiriakis mansion to announce his return before fleeing. Using the Salem Pier as a base of operations, he and he associates gathered weapons and disguises to continue their revenge against Salem. They went after Steve Johnson's family and held his wife, Kayla, and son, Joey, hostage. Steve and Orpheus got into a scuffle but he managed to escape with Joey. Later, Claire Brady was also taken hostage and Orpheus, on live television, interrupted Mayor Carver's speech to Salem and demanded that twenty million dollars be wired to an offshore account, after which, Clyde accidentally shot Abe Carver instead of his own target Aiden Jennings. The ransom fails and the teens are rescued.

Despite the heavy loss of assets and his accomplices, Orpheus remained confident that he still was still in control, so he arranged to have bombs set up all over Salem. The bombs went off, injuring several people, and when Orpheus threatened to blow up the Brady Pub, John surrendered himself to him. Orpheus took John to the penthouse where John transferred twenty million dollars in his untraceable account. He revealed to John that he blamed him and the rest of Salem and the ISA for alienating him from his children because they made him out to be a monster. Steve rescues John and Orpheus is arrested. Later, he kidnaps Marlena and Kayla and placed them coffins, intending to burn them alive. However Steve and John found his location and arrived just in time to save their wives. During a struggle, Orpheus is shot believed to be dead once again. Unknown to everyone, Orpheus went into hiding after he divulged his secrets to the then ISA boss Pamela Van Damme.

Years later, Orpheus became involved with the death of Adrienne Johnson and miscarriage of Sarah Horton's baby in a car accident after kidnaping Maggie Horton to ransom Victor out of money. He and his son Christian, going by Evan Frears, framed Maggie and Will Horton for the accident. Over the next year he tried to help his son avoid prison time for killing Jordan Ridgeway, the mother of his grandson David. His daughter Zoey Burge was brought to help but Christian is arrested and sentenced to prison and Zoey is granted custody of David before leaving Salem. Orpheus is sent back to prison for his involvement in Adrienne's death.

Even from prison, Orpheus still is able to pull off schemes such as kidnapping Marlena again to release his son from a mental hospital and arranging Christian to take over Ciara's imprisonment to ransom Victor out of money again so he and Christian could leave Salem. However, Clyde intervened and Ciara was rescued and Christian was sent back to prison. Later he learned Jan Spears became pregnant with Christian's child and helped her ensure Shawn Brady believed the baby was his in exchange for her help later on.

Orpheus returned once more in March 2025, this time in Estonia as Marlena, Steve, Paul Narita, and Andrew Donovan were searching for the missing John Black, who was on an ISA mission to infiltrate a facility where some sort of "nuclear device" was being built and Orpheus intended to sell it to the highest bidder. He was arrested again and Paul and Andrew eventually find John.

== Paul Stewart ==
Paul Stewart was played by Robert S. Woods from November 7, 1986, to May 4, 1987.

== Anjelica Deveraux ==
Anjelica Deveraux
- Days of Our Lives character
- Portrayed by: Jane Elliot (1987–89); Shelley Taylor Morgan (1989); Judith Chapman (1989–91, 2018); Morgan Fairchild (2017)
- Duration: 1987–91; 2017–18
- First appearance: March 18, 1987
- Last appearance: October 31, 2018
- Created by: Leah Laiman
- Introduced by: Betty Corday, Ken Corday and Al Rabin
In-universe information
- Other names: Anjelica Deveraux Curtis
- Spouse: Harper Deveraux (until 1988); Neil Curtis (1988–89)
- Sons: Alex Kiriakis
- Granddaughters: Kelsey Wesley

Anjelica Deveraux was originated by Jane Elliot on March 18, 1987. Elliot was best known for her portrayal of Tracy Quartermaine on General Hospital. Elliot vacated the role on February 15, 1989. Shelley Taylor Morgan briefly played Anjelica for one month from February 21 to March 24, 1989. Judith Chapman later took over on April 7, 1989, until March 19, 1990, when the character was believed to have been killed off in a plane accident with her son Alexander. Chapman returned for two episodes, airing on January 22 and 23, 1991. Anjelica is known for being the second wife of Harper Deveraux, the Riverfront Knifer, and the mistress of Justin Kiriakis (Wally Kurth).

On May 11, 2017, it was announced that veteran actress Morgan Fairchild had been cast to portray Anjelica. Fairchild departed the show on August 29, 2017, when Anjelica suffers a sudden heart attack and dies. Chapman reprised the role as an apparition during the 2018 Halloween episode. In a January 2019 interview, Chapman revealed she had been asked to reprise the role of Anjelica prior to Fairchild's casting.

== Diana Colville ==
Diana Colville
- Days of Our Lives character
- Portrayed by: Genie Francis (1987–1989); Judith Chapman (2019–2024)
- Duration: 1987–1989; 2019; 2024
- First appearance: April 13, 1987
- Last appearance: June 25, 2024
- Created by: Leah Laiman
- Introduced by: Betty Corday, Ken Corday and Al Rabin
In-universe information
- Other names: Diana Cooper
- Occupation: Journalist
- Parents: Philip Colville; Serena Colville
- Husband: Richard Cooper (offscreen)
- Sons: Leo Stark

Diana Colville was initially portrayed by Genie Francis from 1987 to 1989.

Francis joined Days of Our Lives in the regular role of Diana Colville on April 13, 1987. In June 1989, Francis announced her decision to depart the series. She last appeared during the June 21, 1989, episode. In January 2019, it was announced that Judith Chapman, who previously portrayed the role of Anjelica Deveraux, had been cast in the role of Diana, now going by the surname of Cooper.

Diana came to Salem in 1987 to compete against both her mother, Serena, and Victor Kiriakis in the search for a computer disc. She meets John Black, who believes himself to be Roman Brady, and becomes friends with both him and Carrie Brady, when she saves her life. She eventually begins a relationship with John.

Diana inherits the Colville fortune when her father is murdered, but Victor and Serena try to take the money from her. They trick her into getting married, but John ("Roman") saves her. They try again, but Diana is kidnapped by terrorists and rescued by "Roman", who reveals Victor and Serena's plans. Diana unsuccessfully attempts to frame Victor for the theft of a statue in revenge, after which "Roman" breaks up with her.

Diana and "Roman" resume their relationship after his investigation of the Torres family puts her in danger and she moves back in with him. They hide from the Torreses in the Bahamas and get engaged. Thinking they are safe, they return to Salem. "Roman" is almost killed by a bomb the Torreses plant. "Roman" then begins having memory flashes of John's life. When "Roman" also begins to suspect that his presumed-dead wife, Marlena Evans, is actually alive, it strains his relationship with Diana. Soon after, Diana's supposed first husband arrives, shocking Diana, who thought he was dead. Diana reveals that they were never actually married, but Cal refuses to let go of her. Diana later accidentally shoots "Roman" when he fights with Cal. Filled with guilt, she abruptly leaves Salem.

In 2019, Diana returned to Salem. John, by now a private detective and no longer living as Roman, searches for the mother of Matthew Cooper, who, under the alias of Leo Stark, is blackmailing John's grandson Will Horton. Leo's mother, Diana Cooper, turns out to be Diana Colville, having married Richard Cooper shortly after leaving Salem. Diana had become an embittered schemer, due in part to Richard's abuse. She keeps blackmail material against her own son, who killed Richard. Diana tells John that he is Leo's real father, claiming that she was pregnant when she left Salem, and Richard agreed to raise her child as his own. Hoping to seduce John, Diana poisons Marlena with penicillin, to which Marlena is allergic. Marlena survives and Diana is arrested and admits that John is not Leo's father. In 2024, following an argument with Leo during a visit, she instructs him to never visit again.

== Harper Deveraux ==
Harper Deveraux
- Days of Our Lives character
- Portrayed by: Joseph Campanella
- Duration: 1987–88; 1990–92
- First appearance: May 8, 1987
- Last appearance: April 22, 1992
- Created by: Leah Laiman
- Introduced by: Betty Corday, Ken Corday and Al Rabin
In-universe information
- Other names: Riverfront Knifer (serial killer alias)
- Occupation: Senator
- Spouse: Camille Deveraux (Backstory); Anjelica Deveraux (Until 1988)
- Adoptive sons: Jack Deveraux
- Grandchildren: Abigail Deveraux (adoptive); JJ Deveraux (adoptive); Gwen Rizczech (adoptive)

Harper Deveraux was played by Joseph Campanella on a recurring status May 8, 1987. On May 10, 1988, Campanella was upgraded to contract status when Harper was revealed to be the Riverfront Knifer, a serial killer who murdered women in Salem including Janice Barnes (Elizabeth Storm) and Grace Forrester (Camilla More). Among his other victims, Eve Donovan (Charlotte Ross), Kayla Brady (Mary Beth Evans), Kimberly Brady (Patsy Pease) and several others managed to survive. Campanella briefly departed the role on July 5, 1988, when he was downgraded back to recurring from August 9, 1988, until October 21, 1988. Campanella later returned as Harper one last time to thwart the second wedding of Steve Johnson and Kayla Brady and later in visions had by his adopted son Jack from March 9, 1990, to April 22, 1992.

== Trent Robbins ==
Trent Robbins
- Days of Our Lives character
- Portrayed by: Charles Van Eman (1987); Roscoe Born (2008)
- Duration: 1987; 2008
- First appearance: June 8, 1987
- Last appearance: December 9, 2008
- Created by: Leah Laiman
- Introduced by: Betty Corday, Ken Corday and Al Rabin (1987); Ken Corday and Edward J. Scott (2008)
In-universe information
- Other names: Trent Becker
- Occupation: Teacher
- Sons: Max Brady
- Adoptive daughters: Melanie Jonas
- Grandchildren: Issac Brady

Trent Robbins was initially played by Charles Van Eman in 1987 and then by Roscoe Born when the character was reintroduced in 2008. He was the biological father of Max Brady and the adoptive father of Melanie Layton.

He abused Max as a child, causing Max to become socially isolated and mute for several years. He showed up at the Brady Pub, wanting to reclaim his son. Trent soon realized Max was happy with the Brady family, and left town.

Trent returned in 2008 as the Dean of the Physics department at Salem University. It was revealed that he was still married to Nicole Walker. He re-entered Max's life by awarding Nick Fallon a grant for his "work" on a fuel cell. Unbeknownst to Trent, Max was responsible for the majority of Nick's design. Max became short-tempered upon seeing Trent and confronted him. After Max insisted that Trent take responsibility for his abusive actions, Trent offered to pay him off in order to keep his past a secret.

Trent was murdered via a stab in the back. Among the suspects were Caroline Brady, Trent's children Max and Melanie, and his wife Nicole. It was revealed that Nick was responsible for the murder. Nick maintained that he killed Trent in Melanie's defense, and that his addiction to alcohol and painkillers played a role in his bad decision.

== Henderson ==
Henderson is Victor's butler. Ron Leath is the actor who has portrayed Henderson off and on since July 6, 1987. He is routinely seen answering the door and serving meals in the Kiriakis mansion. He is extremely loyal to Victor Kiriakis.

== Eve Donovan ==
Eve Donovan
- Days of Our Lives character
- Portrayed by: Charlotte Ross (1987–1991); Kassie DePaiva (2014–2023)
- Duration: 1987–1991; 2014–2020; 2023
- First appearance: July 16, 1987
- Last appearance: August 3, 2023
- Created by: Leah Laiman
- Introduced by: Betty Corday, Ken Corday and Al Rabin (1987); Ken Corday, Lisa de Cazotte and Greg Meng (2014); Ken Corday, Albert Alarr and Greg Meng (2016–2017, 2020)
In-universe information
- Other names: Eve Baron; Eve Larson; Blair; Chelsea
- Occupation: Singer; Prostitute
- Parents: Shane Donovan; Gabrielle Pascal
- Stepparents: Kimberly Brady
- Half-brothers: Andrew Donovan IV
- Half-sisters: Theresa Donovan
- Spouse: Jack Deveraux (1991, 2019); Frankie Brady (offscreen) (Note: Eve revealed during a conversation with Paige, in 2014, that she and Frankie were once married outside of Salem.); Eduardo Larson (offscreen); Deimos Kiriakis (2017)
- Daughters: Paige Larson
- Grandparents: Andrew Donovan II; Margaret Donovan
- Aunts and uncles: Andrew Donovan III
- Nieces and nephews: Tate Black

Eve Donovan was introduced in 1987 and portrayed by actress Charlotte Ross until 1991. In June 2014, the character returned, this time portrayed by actress Kassie DePaiva. Introduced in the series as a prostitute, Eve is the daughter of Shane Donovan (Charles Shaughnessy) and Gabrielle Pascal. She is also the half-sister of Andrew Donovan and Theresa Donovan (Jen Lilley). Upon her return on June 18, 2014, she made an immediate connection with Daniel Jonas (Shawn Christian) and reunited with her daughter Paige Larson (True O'Brien). DePaiva last appeared as Eve on February 2, 2016. In May 2016, it was announced that DePaiva would briefly reprise her role as Eve, and she aired from September 8 to October 4, 2016. The character returned from December 9 to 12, 2016 following a two-month hiatus. In May 2017, it was revealed the character would yet again return on October 27, 2017, and departed the role again on December 24, 2019 - following her character's release from prison. DePaiva announced in May 2020 that she would returning to the series and she appeared from July 30 to September 25, 2020.

In 2014, after 22 years, Eve returned to Salem and is shown meeting with Dr Daniel Jonas to discuss a throat surgery which she hopes will help relaunch her singing career. She soon reunites with her daughter Paige Larson who she does not know is dating JJ Deveraux, the son of Eve's ex-husband Jack Deveraux and her old high school rival, Jennifer Horton. Eve hopes to gain financial support by obtaining half the profits made by Jack's book about his life in the army, which he apparently owed her as part of their annulment agreement. Jennifer, who is the executive of Jack's estate, refuses to give her any share of the money as it being donated to a charity which supports war veterans, when Eve threatens to sue her, Jennifer can not risk the toll this will have on her family and agrees to give Eve her share.

When Eve learns about JJ's history of drug dealing from her half-sister Theresa, she becomes wary of his and Paige's relationship and does everything she can to split them up. When Eve learns that she will never be able to sing again she is devastated, JJ comes by her apartment hoping to have it out with her after having just broken up with Paige but once he sees how fragile she is he comforts her, they end up having sex and are distraught afterwards when they realize what they have just done to Paige. JJ and Paige soon get back together but are forced to break up when JJ once again sleeps with Eve.

Eve and JJ continue their affair until they are caught in bed together by Jennifer who furiously attacks Eve. Jennifer decides not to tell Paige the truth about JJ and Eve but blackmails Eve into encouraging Paige to get back together with JJ. Eve tries to get JJ arrested by having drugs planted in his backpack, when JJ confronts her about it to get a recorded confession, they do not realize that Paige is in the next room and hears them confessing to their affair. An enraged Paige slaps Eve and disowns her as her mother before going to JJ's house and revealing the truth to all his friends and family who were attending a surprise birthday party JJ was throwing for Paige.

Eve's life is shattered when Paige is murdered by a serial killer known as the Neck-tie killer, who is later revealed to be Ben Weston. This prompts Paige's estranged father and Eve's ex-husband Eduardo Larson to come to Salem in the hope of consoling Eve through her grief, but Eve is still resentful towards him for abandoning her and Paige years previously. She is even more angered to learn that Eduardo is the father of Rafe and Gabi Hernandez, who are part of another family Eduardo left before he met Eve.

Eve begins a relationship with Justin Kiriakis who helped console Eve after Paige's death, when Eduardo wants to set up a music program in Paige's name at the community center, he asks Eve to run it and she accepts. Eve takes a particular interest in Claire Brady, one of her students and believes she possesses great talent as a singer. Eve starts indulging much of her time with Claire much to the annoyance of her mother Belle Brady, who believes Eve is using Claire as a surrogate daughter to replace Paige. When Eve gets Claire an audition for a place at Juilliard School for the performing arts in New York City, she and Claire sneak off to New York without Belle's permission.

Claire returns soon after and reveals that she did not get a place in Juilliard but Eve does not return with her and her Whereabouts remain unknown until her sister Theresa reveals that she is no longer living in Salem when talking about her upcoming wedding to her fiancée Brady Black.

Eve returns several months later for Theresa's bachelorette party and wedding. However, before the wedding starts the party is invaded by former Salem criminal Orpheus who grabs Eve and holds her at gunpoint. She and several other guests are released when Paul Narita takes her place as a hostage. Afterwards at the police station, Eve forms a bond with Nicole Walker over their shared grief of lost loved one's. Eve goes back to New York soon after but not before helping her ex-boyfriend Justin realize he still has feelings for his ex-wife Adrienne.

After a failed attempt to brainwash Ben into killing Ciara as revenge for Paige's death, she is arrested and in 2023 is revealed to be at Bayview Sanitarium. She meets up with Harris Michaels again where they catch up and make amends. Claiming to be on the verge of release, Eve says she plans to go to California to be near her family and maybe relaunch her music career as a way to start over.

In 2020, Charlie Mason from Soaps She Knows placed Eve 26th on his list of the 35 most memorable characters from Days of Our Lives, commenting "Whether she was being played by Charlotte Ross or Kassie DePaiva, the hurricane in heels let us know at a glance that if she was in the room, there wasn't gonna be anyone in it more entertaining to watch."

== Marcus Hunter ==
Marcus Hunter
- Days of Our Lives character
- Portrayed by: Richard Biggs
- Duration: 1987–1992
- First appearance: November 30, 1987
- Last appearance: December 14, 1992
- Created by: Leah Laiman
- Introduced by: Betty Corday, Ken Corday and Al Rabin
- Spin-off appearances: Days of Our Lives: One Stormy Night (1992)
In-universe information
- Occupation: Plastic surgeon
- Parents: Samuel Hunter; Eleanor Hunter
- Brothers: Steve Johnson (foster)
- Daughters: Jada Hunter; Talia Hunter
- Aunts: Lizzie Putnam

Marcus Hunter, played by Richard Briggs, was introduced as the childhood friend and foster brother of Steve "Patch" Johnson (Stephen Nichols). Briggs originated the role on November 30, 1987.

In 1987, Marcus is introduced as the new plastic surgeon at Salem University Hospital when he breaks up a fight between his foster brother Steve and Jack Deveraux (Matthew Ashford) – Steve's biological brother. Steve introduces Marcus to Jack's ailing wife, Kayla Brady (Mary Beth Evans) and admits he's in love with her. Marcus gives Steve an antidote for Kayla who has been poisoned.

In early 1988, after Jack has Patch beaten up, Kayla confides in Marcus that Jack raped her, but swears him to secrecy. Jack falls off a roof during a fight with Patch and who donates his kidney to save Jack's life. However, Jack's rejects the kidney and doctors conclude it's psychological, so Marcus encourages Patch and Kayla to reconcile with Jack.

In spring of 1988, Marcus becomes smitten with Police officer Lexie Brooks (Cyndi James Gossett) as she works to apprehend a local serial killer. However, fellow police officer Abe Carver (James Reynolds) also has a thing for Lexie. Marcus accidentally blows Lexie's cover as she investigates a local serial killer. Later, Marcus clashes with social worker Vanessa Walker (Joyce Little) over how to deal with local gangs. Throughout the summer of 1988, Marcus and Vanessa grow closer as they work together at the community center. After they deliver a baby together, Marcus confides in her about growing up in an orphanage with Patch. Marcus recognizes Vanessa's uncle, Desmond (Randy Brooks) but does not know from where. Marcus rescues the daughter of Charlene, (Vanessa Bell Calloway), a woman who frequents the community center. She later takes his advice and gets a job to support herself and her two children. However, Charlene gets fired and Marcus agrees to finance her catering business, as long as she doesn't tell Vanessa. In late 1988, Marcus helps Shane Donovan rescue Patch when he is nearly killed by Stefano DiMera (Joseph Mascolo).

Marcus had always wanted to know about his past, and, in 1989, got help from Gail Carson, an anesthesiologist at the hospital. Marcus, Steve, and Gail went to Charleston, South Carolina to talk to Marcus' aunt, Lizzie Putnam. Lizzie didn't tell them much, and forced him to stop looking into his past. Later, he becomes entangled with Steve's investigation with Saul Taylor's revival camp, briefly dating Saul's daughter Faith. Eventually, Marcus remembered that his parents had been killed by Saul and his partner, Jericho, when they had blown up the church that they were in. Marcus eventually learned Gail was really an ISA agent, and that ended their friendship.

After Steve was believed to have been killed, he developed feelings for Kayla but she did not return those feelings. In 1992, Marcus left Salem. In time, he eventually had two daughters Jada and Talia. It is unknown who their mother is and Marcus has since died in between his departure and Jada's arrival in Salem.

== Harris Michaels ==
Harris Michaels
- Days of Our Lives character
- Portrayed by: Steve Burton
- Duration: 1988, 2022–2024
- First appearance: July 21, 1988
- Last appearance: June 24, 2024
- Created by: Leah Laiman
- Introduced by: Ken Corday and Al Rubin
- Spin-off appearances: Days of Our Lives: Beyond Salem
In-universe information
- Occupation: Navy officer Salem police officer (2023–2024)

Harris Michaels was played by Steve Burton in 1988, July 2022 for the second chapter of Beyond Salem, and since March 2023. In January 2024, Burton announced he had wrapped filming the month prior; he exited during the June 24 episode.

Harris went to school with Eve Donovan where he made a bet with his friends to see who could score with her first. After many dates, he began to care about her, but she learned about his true intentions and she attempted to kill herself on sleeping pills. He tried to apologize and make up for it, but Eve never forgave him.

Harris reappeared decades later, formerly of the Navy, now working for Megan Hathaway. He was tasked with dating Hope Brady, so he could later kill her. Harris also kidnapped John Black and Steve Johnson on Megan's orders. Harris proposed to Hope, which made Megan wonder if Harris was falling for Hope. At the wedding, his true allegiance is revealed after he is shot by a stray bullet from Thomas Banks, another associate of Megan's. He still gets the prism to Megan, however, he hesitates to kill Hope which leads to his arrest. Later, Hope visited Harris and asked if he ever really cared about her. Harris claimed he did care about Hope and though maybe he too was brainwashed by Megan just as John and Steve were, but she left him to face the consequences of his actions.

After being rehabilitated, Harris became instrumental in helping save Bo from Megan. However, he was brainwashed again by Megan to kill Stefan, but he fought long in enough to shoot her instead. Despite Megan escaping, Harris decided to check into Bayview, thinking he was safer there from Megan and himself. There, he meets Eve again and the two make peace and he later befriends Ava Vitali and helps her remember more about her ordeal the night Susan Banks and her drove off a cliff. She learns Susan is alive and the two escape from EJ's assassin to find his mother. After rescuing Susan from London, Harris becomes a detective and begins a romantic relationship with Ava. They both get entangled by Clyde Weston's drug ring and work together to take him down. After Clyde escapes prison, the two, along with Lucas Horton, track Clyde in Montana where he is arrested again.

Upon his return to Salem, Hope contacts Harris about a possible lead on Megan's whereabouts and he decides to follow-up on it, saying goodbye to Ava and leaving Salem.

== Vern Scofield ==
Vern Scofield
- Days of Our Lives character
- Portrayed by: Wayne Heffley
- Duration: 1988–1993, 2002–2003, 2006
- First appearance: July 26, 1988
- Last appearance: September 21, 2006
- Created by: Leah Laiman
- Introduced by: Ken Corday and Al Rubin
In-universe information
- Family: Scofield
- Spouse: Nancy Scofield
- Sons: Brain Scofield; Tanner Scofield
- Daughters: Cassie Scofield

Vern Scofield, played by Wayne Heffley from 1988 to 1993 and again in 2002, 2003, and 2006, raised three children (Brian, Tanner, and Cassie) after the death of his wife. Vern's primary role was to be Jack's right-hand man at the Spectator and supported Jack's relationship with Jennifer. Vern began dating Jo Johnson, Jack's mother, in 1993 when both characters left. In 2002, it was revealed that Vern and Jo had married and were still living in Salem. They returned for Jack's "funeral" in 2003 and later for Jack and Jennifer's wedding and farewell in 2006. Although Heffley died in 2008, Vern was mentioned as alive in December 2016.

== Benjy Hawk ==
Benjy Hawk
- Days of Our Lives character
- Portrayed by: Darrell Thomas Utley (1988–1990); Jim Lunsford (2006–2007)
- Duration: 1988–1990; 2006–2007
- First appearance: August 1, 1988
- Last appearance: October 1, 2007
- Created by: Leah Laiman
- Introduced by: Ken Corday and Al Rabin
In-universe information
- Father: Stefano DiMera
- Mother: Ellen Hawk
- Half-brothers: André DiMera; Tony DiMera (legal); Peter Blake (adoptive); Stefan DiMera; Jake Lambert; EJ DiMera; Chad DiMera
- Half-sisters: Renée DuMonde; Megan DiMera; Kristen DiMera (adoptive); Lexie Carver
- Wife: Sonja Hawk (until 2007)
- Sons: Steven Hawk
- Grandfathers: Santo DiMera; Orion Hawk
- Nephews: Dimitri Von Leuschner; Theo Carver; Johnny DiMera; Thomas DiMera
- Nieces: Sydney DiMera; Grace Brady; Charlotte DiMera; Rachel Black (adoptive)

Benjy Hawk, is the previously unknown son of Stefano DiMera (Joseph Mascolo). The role was originated by child actor Darrell Thomas Utley from 1988 to 1990. The character was reintroduced in 2006 before he was killed off in 2007.

== Kristina Andropolous ==
Kristina Andropolous was a character portrayed by Chelsea Noble from August to October 1988 and then by Susan Saldivar until November of that year.

Kristina is the sole daughter of Teodor Andropolous. The Andropolous were wealthy neighbors, business partners, and friends of the Kiriakis. Thus, She grew up in the Greek island of Naphleon along with Justin Kiriakis, and she even attended the same Swiss boarding school as he. Kristina and Justin had always been fierce rivals in everything they did, but at the same time kept a very close relationship that turned into a high school romance. After they graduated, they went their separate ways. Kristina eventually became a savvy business woman, as her father prepped her to take over the helm of the Andropolous business.

== Alex Kiriakis ==
Alex Kiriakis
- Days of Our Lives character
- Portrayed by: Jonathon Thornton (1989–1991); Robert Scott Wilson (2022–present)
- Duration: 1989–1991, 2022–present
- First appearance: February 24, 1989
- Created by: Leah Laiman
- Introduced by: Ken Corday and Al Rabin (1989, 1991); Ken Corday and Albert Alarr (2022)
In-universe information
- Other names: Alexander Neil Kiriakis II
- Parents: Justin Kiriakis; Anjelica Deveraux
- Stepmother: Bonnie Lockhart
- Siblings: Joey Kiriakis (adoptive); Victor Kiriakis II (adoptive); Sonny Kiriakis
- Spouse: Theresa Donovan (2024) Stephanie Johnson (m. 2026)
- Children: Kelsey Wesley
- Grandparents: Alexander Kiriakis; Christina Kiriakis
- Other relatives: Victor Kiriakis; Xander Kiriakis

Alex Kiriakis is the son of Justin Kiriakis (Wally Kurth) and Anjelica Deveraux (Judith Chapman). The role was originated by child actor Jonathan Thornton from February 24, 1989, until March 19, 1990. Thornton briefly reprised the role from January 23 to February 5, 1991. On July 19, 2022, Soap Opera Digest announced Robert Scott Wilson would take over the role of Alex Kiriakis; he made his debut in the role on July 26.

In February 1989, Anjelica gives birth to her son with her former lover Justin by her side. Anjelica's husband Neil Curtis (Joseph Gallison) misses the birth and Justin steps in, not knowing he is the boy's father. Justin's uncle Victor Kiriakis (John Aniston) names the baby Alexander, after Justin's father, behind Anjelica's back. Anjelica warns him that Neil will fight him in court. Meanwhile, Justin and his estranged wife Adrienne are named the boy's godparents. While Neil is distracted due to his gambling addiction, Victor steals a tape of Anjelica confessing Alexander's paternity and plots to raise Alexander as his own. When Victor and Justin have a falling out, Anjelica convinces Neil to adopt Alexander to keep Victor at bay. Victor suddenly pressures Neil to repay his debts and a desperate Anjelica gives Adrienne a copy of her confession tape. Adrienne confronts Justin and while he admits to the affair, he insist on a DNA test to prove Anjelica's claims. The DNA test proves that Alexander is Justin's son leaving Adrienne devastated and Neil furious over being kept in the dark. Justin promises to provide for Alexander but he refuses to give up on Adrienne. In May 1989, Anjelica takes Alexander and leaves Neil. She tries to rent the apartment next door to Justin, but Adrienne won't allow it. Anjelica later crashes a surprise party for Adrienne's mother Jo (Joy Garrett) begging Justin to take her to the hospital as Alexander is sick. Justin calls Anjelica out for her schemes as Alexander proves to be healthy. When Justin refuses to let her move in with him, she threatens to move in with Victor. Justin calls her bluff and forces Anjelica's hand, so she turns to Victor. Justin legally establishes himself as Alexander's father leaving Adrienne in fear that she'll lose her husband to Alexander and Anjelica. Meanwhile, Anjelica rethinks her decision to raise Alexander around Victor due to his womanizing. Victor offers to marry Anjelica but she rejects him for Justin. Fearing Victor will ultimately turn Alexander against him, Justin schemes to get Alexander, and Anjelica, away from his uncle. A desperate Anjelica accepts Victor's proposal only for Justin to interrupt the wedding and announce that Alexander and Anjelica are moving in with him. Unable to cope with Anjelica and Alexander's presence, Adrienne moves out leaving Justin in turmoil as he cannot choose between his wife and his son. After failing to seduce Justin, Anjelica plans to take Alexander and move out only for Victor to have him abducted from Justin's penthouse. Fortunately, Roman Brady (Drake Hogestyn) rescues Alexander from Victor's henchwoman, Yvette (Lori Hallier). Anjelica starts to spiral as she prepares to move out and Justin ask her and Alexander to stay. In October 1989, Justin moves back to the Kiriakis mansion alongside Alexander and Anjelica just as he and Adrienne are legally separated. In November 1989, Anjelica is worried that Alexander will lose out on his piece of the Kiriakis empire when Victor announces his engagement to Yvette.

When Anjelica's plans to ruin Adrienne's construction business are uncovered, she destroys evidence of her planting a bomb at one of the sights and plans to skip town with Alexander in March 1990. Anjelica and Alexander are believed to have died when their plane reportedly crashes leaving Justin devastated and Victor blaming his nephew. However, Anjelica and Alexander are alive as they were on another flight.

In early 1991, Johnny Corelli (Antony Alda) steals $1 million from Victor to buy information on Alexander and Anjelica. However, he learns mother and son are alive, and tracks them to a private island. Knowing her son needs a better life, Anjelica lets Johnny take Alexander back to Salem. Before he is arrested, Johnny hands the boy over his former sister-in-law April Ramirez (Lisa Howard). Posing as Victor's son Bo Brady (Peter Reckell), Johnny lures Justin back to Salem from Texas by claiming Victor is sick again. Johnny successfully reunites Alexander with Justin. Justin and Adrienne take Alexander to their home in Dallas.

Soon after they arrived in Texas, Adrienne gave birth to his younger half-brother, Jackson "Sonny" Kiriakis (Freddie Smith). Although never shown on-screen, Alexander returned to Salem in 2007 with his parents and brothers, where he attended Salem High School. His time in town was short lived, however, and by January 2008 the entire family moved again – this time to Dubai. In 2011, Sonny revealed that Alexander had a difficult time at first accepting when he first came out as gay. In 2015, Alexander was revealed to be living in Arizona when Sonny was going through troubles with his husband Will Horton (Chandler Massey) and he went to visit him.

In late July 2022, Alex returns to Salem, where he reunits with his father and his brother Sonny, also meeting his stepmother Bonnie Lockhart (Judi Evans). After he broke up with Sloan Peterson (Jessica Serfaty), after he found out that she is Leo Stark's (Greg Rikaart) lawyer, while he was on his way to work, he bumped into Stephanie Johnson (Abigail Klein), the daughter of Steve Johnson (Stephen Nichols) and Kayla Brady (Mary Beth Evans), who just arrived back in town and after listening his brother Sonny's words on love, he developed a connection to Stephanie.

== Ernesto Toscano ==
Ernesto Toscano
- Days of Our Lives character
- Portrayed by: Terrence Beasor (1989); Charles Cioffi (1990); Ernesto Macias (1990)
- Duration: 1989–1990
- First appearance: November 17, 1989
- Last appearance: July 17, 1990
- Created by: Anne Howard Bailey
- Introduced by: Ken Corday, Shelley Curtis (1989); Ken Corday and Al Rabin (1990)
In-universe information
- Occupation: Businessman
- Wife: Loretta Toscano
- Daughters: Marina Toscano
- Adoptive daughters: Isabella Toscano

Ernesto Toscano was a character from Days of Our Lives portrayed by Terrance Beasor from November to December 1989, Charles Cioffi and Ernesto Macias from January 26 to July 17 of 1990.

He was introduced as a voice-over in flashback in Isabella's mind before being introduced formally in 1990 as Victor Kiriakis' former friend turned enemy. After he found out his wife Loretta had an affair with Victor, which resulted in Isabella, he poisoned her. He kidnapped Bo Brady and Johnny Corelli as part of a plan to destroy Victor, however, the two men escaped and Ernesto lost his leverage. He later learned that Isabella had killed his only biological daughter Marina, albeit in self-defense, which only incensed his hatred for her even more.

He arranged the Cruise of Deception, during which he planned to recover Loretta's diary, and get revenge on all his enemies. He invited Roman Brady (John Black), Victor Kiriakis, Jack Deveraux, Jennifer Horton, Bo, Hope Williams Brady, Julie Olson Williams, and Isabella to come along. He had set a bomb to explode on board the cruise ship while taking Isabella to an island to kill her the same way he killed Loretta. Everyone on board, however, escaped to the island and save Isabella. But Ernesto still had the upper hand. He held Hope suspended over a vat of acid. Ernesto gave Bo a chance to plead for his wife's life, but he wasn't moved by what Bo had to say. Suddenly there was an explosion, and the cage was sent crashing down into the vat of acid and Ernesto has been presumed dead since. It was learned years later that another young woman, Greta Von Amberg, took Hope's place and ended up horribly scarred while Hope had ended up with Stefano DiMera, believing she was Princess Gina Von Amberg.

== See also ==
- List of Days of Our Lives characters
- List of Days of Our Lives characters (1960s)
- List of Days of Our Lives characters (1970s)
- List of Days of Our Lives characters (1990s)
- List of Days of Our Lives characters (2000s)
- List of Days of Our Lives characters (2010s)
- List of Days of Our Lives characters (2020s)
- List of Days of Our Lives cast members
- List of previous Days of Our Lives cast members
