= Tony DiMera =

- Days of Our Lives character
- Portrayed by: Thaao Penghlis
- Duration: 1981–1985; 2007–2009; 2019–2023; 2025–present
- First appearance: November 6, 1981
- Created by: Pat Falken Smith
- Introduced by: Betty Corday and Al Rabin (1981); Ken Corday and Stephen Wyman (2007); Ken Corday, Albert Alarr and Greg Meng (2019); Ken Corday and Janet Spellman-Drucker (2025)
- Spin-off appearances: Chad and Abby in Paris (2019); Days of Our Lives: Beyond Salem (2021)
In-universe information
- Other names: Count Anthony DiMera; Mickey Horton
- Family: DiMera
- Father: Enrico
- Mother: Daphne DiMera
- Stepfather: Stefano DiMera (until 1984)
- Half-brothers: André DiMera (legal); Peter Blake (adoptive); Benjy Hawk (legal); EJ DiMera (legal); Chad DiMera (legal); Stefan DiMera (legal); Jake Lambert (legal)
- Half-sisters: Kristen DiMera (adoptive); Renée DuMonde (legal); Megan DiMera (legal); Lexie Carver (legal)
- Wife: Liz Chandler (until 1983); Anna Fredericks (1983, 1985, 2008–2009, 2020–present); Kristen DiMera (2019) (Note: Kristen at the time was pretending to be Nicole Walker.)
- Aunts: Philomena Alamain
- Nephews: Theo Carver (legal); Steven Hawk (legal); Johnny DiMera (legal); Thomas DiMera (legal)
- Nieces: Grace Brady (legal); Sydney DiMera (legal); Charlotte DiMera (legal); Rachel Black (adoptive)
- First cousins: Lawrence Alamain; John Black (adoptive)

Tony DiMera is a fictional character from the Peacock American soap opera Days of Our Lives, played by actor Thaao Penghlis on and off from November 6, 1981, until October 24, 1985, and from July 19, 2007, until April 1, 2009. One of the character's main storylines includes being impersonated by fellow character André DiMera at various points in the character's tenure. Both roles were played by Penghlis. He reprised the role in a guest capacity in March 2019, before returning in a recurring capacity later that July, and exiting again in May 2023. On October 3, 2024, it was announced Penghlis would reprise the role, when Tony returned in June 2025.

== Storylines ==
Count Tony DiMera arrived in Salem in 1981 with two purposes. He wanted to win back his wife, Liz Chandler, whom he had never officially divorced. He also wanted to scope out Salem on orders from his father Stefano DiMera to see if it was suitable to relocate the DiMera family business. Setting up his penthouse with hidden cameras, Tony throws a big party with invites sent to all of Salem's finest. After the party, Tony shows the videos to Stefano. Learning that the Brady family, the DiMeras sworn enemy, is alive and well in Salem, Stefano has Tony plant roots in the business community in order to continue the vendetta against them.

In 1982, Tony proposed to Renée DuMonde, who accepted. However, Renée discovered Lee DuMonde's diary. Reading the diary she learned that Lee was really her mother and that Stefano DiMera was her father, making Tony her half-brother. Renée quickly broke things off with Tony, not telling him the real reason in order to spare his feelings. Tony refused to let Renée go and, when she told him the truth, he refused to believe they were siblings. Tony blamed Stefano for breaking them up. When Tony tried to leave town, Stefano faked a heart attack. Tony later learned that he and Renée were in fact not related due to a death-bed confession by his mother Daphne DiMera and had the blood tests to prove it. Renée had moved on and was married to David Banning when Tony learned the truth. Despite the evidence that they were not related, Renée refused to leave David. She was later killed by André.

Around the same time, Liz Chandler became pregnant with Neil Curtis' child, though Tony believed it was his. Tony would grant Liz her divorce, but only after the baby was born, because he wanted the baby if it proved to be his. Liz gave birth to her baby, and when Tony realized it was Neil Curtis' child he quickly divorced Liz.

In 1984, Tony and evil lookalike André came face to face. André chained Tony up and took his place pretending to be Tony. It was the first, but wouldn't be the last time he impersonated Tony in the next 20 years.

In 1985, Tony and Anna became engaged once again. Their attempts at marriage encountered many rocky starts. Their first attempt was sabotaged by Alex Marshall and an actor playing a minister, thus their "marriage" was invalid. When they attempted a second time to get married, Anna was kidnapped. Eventually Tony and Anna were finally married, and returned to Salem. After returning from Salem Anna was accused of murder and while trying to prove her innocence Tony disappeared. Anna was also blamed for her husband's disappearance, but in truth Tony was held captive by a very much alive Claud Van Zandt, Anna's supposed victim. Claud was eventually discovered as being alive, and Anna was acquitted of all charges. Eventually, Tony was blackmailed by Emma Donovan to divorce Anna and leave Salem.

In 1994, Kristen Blake promised her ailing father, Stefano that she would marry Tony. She goes through with her wedding to Tony, who is later revealed to be Tony's lookalike, André (Penghlis). Kristen travels to the family estate in New Orleans, Maison Blanche, where she is taken captive by a very much alive Stefano forcing John Black to come to the rescue. She later discovers "Tony's" schemes to impregnate her and moves in with John. She and John are about to marry when it is revealed that John is actually a priest; Kristen, a devout Catholic, returns to "Tony." Later, John and Kristen are reunited after he is released from his vows and her marriage to "Tony" is annulled. In November 1995, Kristen goes to Aremid as her brother Peter Blake is preparing to marry Jennifer Horton (Melissa Reeves). While there, "Tony" fakes his death and frames John. Though she believes in John's innocence, Peter forces Kristen to testify against him despite John being exonerated.

After over twenty years outside of Salem, Tony was finally located on a deserted island. Anna convinced him to return to Salem to confront his past (and his father), and Tony agreed to team up with the Bradys to end the DiMera/Brady feud once and for all.

In 2009, Count Antony "Tony" DiMera was pronounced dead in Salem University Hospital after falling and becoming impaled, following a fight with Philip Kiriakis over a fuels project that Tony acquired from Titan Industries. The fight was witnessed by Tony's then sister-in-law Nicole Walker. In March 2019, Tony appears in a dream to Marlena Evans. In July 2019, he is revealed to be alive when Kristen (Stacy Haiduk) visits him in Chicago, after it is revealed she helped him escape from a warehouse explosion, where he was being kept during Dr. Rolf's experimental treatment. There, Kristen blackmails Tony into marrying her — under the disguise of Nicole — in order to gain control of DiMera Enterprises.

== Paternity ==
Before her death, Daphne DiMera claimed that her lover Enrico, the DiMera family gardener, was Tony's real father and blood tests in the early 1980s supported this as fact.

== Reception ==
In 2020, Charlie Mason from Soaps She Knows placed Tony and André jointly at #28 on a list of the 35 most memorable characters from Days of Our Lives, commenting that "Thaao Penghlis’ lookalike connivers have to share an entry, if only because during any given era, we could never be sure which of them we were really watching."
