= Dumonde =

Dumonde may refer to:

- DuMonde, a German Trance duo
- Lee DuMonde and Renée DuMonde, fictional characters on the television soap opera Days of our Lives
