= Liz Chandler =

Character in Days of Our Lives

- Days of Our Lives character
- Portrayed by: Gloria Loring
- Duration: 1980–1986, 2024
- First appearance: April 25, 1980
- Last appearance: December 3, 2024
- Created by: Nina Laemmle
- Introduced by: Betty Corday and Al Rabin (1980); Ken Corday and Janet Spellman-Drucker (2024)
In-universe information
- Other names: Liz Courtney; Liz DiMera; Liz Craig; Liz Curtis
- Occupation: Lounge singer
- Father: Kellam Chandler
- Half-brothers: Tod Chandler
- Spouse: Rick Courtney (divorced); Tony DiMera (until 1983); Don Craig (1981); Neil Curtis (1984–1987)
- Daughters: Noelle Curtis

Liz Chandler is a fictional character on the soap opera Days of Our Lives, played by actress Gloria Loring from 1980 to 1986. In April 2024, Deidre Hall announced Loring would reprise the role.

== Storylines ==
Liz came to Salem in 1980. She is the daughter of Kellam Chandler, the former governor of the state in which Salem is situated. She is also a singer, and was the headlining cabaret act at Salem's nightclub Doug's Place owned by Doug Williams and Neil Curtis. One of the memorable songs performed by Liz was "Friends and Lovers", which was recorded as a duet by Loring with singer Carl Anderson and became a hit single on the US pop chart. In 1983, she shot Marie Horton, whom she hated because Marie was married to her great love, Neil Curtis. Liz was sent to prison but was later released on parole. In 1986, she left Salem. In December 2024, Liz returns for Doug's funeral.
