= Kristen DiMera =

Fictional character from Days of Our Lives

Kristen Blake DiMera
- Days of Our Lives character
- Stacy Haiduk as Kristen DiMera
- Portrayed by: Eileen Davidson (1993–2017, 2021); Leslie Lunceford (1996); Stacy Haiduk (2018–present); Arianne Zucker (2019); Linsey Godfrey (2021); Lauren Koslow (2021)
- Duration: 1993–1998; 2012–2015; 2017–present
- First appearance: May 17, 1993
- Created by: James E. Reilly
- Introduced by: Ken Corday and Tom Langan (1993); Ken Corday, Lisa de Cazotte and Greg Meng (2012); Ken Corday, Albert Alarr and Greg Meng (2017–2022)
- Spin-off appearances: Days of Our Lives: Beyond Salem (2021); Days of Our Lives: A Very Salem Christmas (2021)
In-universe information
- Other names: Kristen Blake; Kristen Black; Susan Banks; Fay Taylor; Mrs Winston; Nicole Walker (2019); Sister Mary Moira Banks (2019, 2021); Sarah Horton (2021); Kate Roberts (2021)
- Occupation: Businesswoman; Nun; Social worker
- Family: DiMera
- Mother: Rachel Blake
- Adoptive father: Stefano DiMera
- Brothers: Peter Blake
- Half-brothers: André DiMera (adoptive); Benjy Hawk (adoptive); EJ DiMera (adoptive); Chad DiMera (adoptive); Stefan DiMera (adoptive); Jake Lambert (adoptive); Tony DiMera (legal/adoptive)
- Half-sisters: Renée DuMonde (adoptive); Megan DiMera (adoptive); Lexie Carver (adoptive)
- Husband: André DiMera (1994–1995) (Note: André at the time was pretending to be Tony and Kristen assumed she had married Tony.); Edmund Crumb (1998) (Note: Kristen at the time was pretending to be Susan and Edmund assumed he had married Kristen.); Tony DiMera (2019) (Note: Kristen at the time was pretending to be Nicole.)
- Daughters: Rachel Isabella Black
- Grandfathers: Santo DiMera (adoptive)
- Uncles: Ryan Brady (adoptive)
- Nephews: Dimitri Von Leuschner (adoptive); Theo Carver (adoptive); Steven Hawk (adoptive); Johnny DiMera (adoptive); Thomas DiMera (adoptive)
- Nieces: Sydney DiMera (adoptive); Grace Brady (adoptive); Charlotte DiMera (adoptive)

Kristen Blake DiMera is a fictional character from Days of Our Lives, an American soap opera on the NBC network. The role was portrayed by Eileen Davidson. Davidson joined the cast of Days of Our Lives in 1993, and departed in 1998 after a five-year stint. After a 14-year absence, Davidson returned to the role of Kristen in the fall of 2012. Kristen and her brother Peter were raised by super villain Stefano DiMera at a very young age following the deaths of their parents; however, their mother Rachel was later revealed to be alive.

Davidson departed the series again in November 2013, although she made a brief appearance the following month. She returned on July 28, 2014, for a twelve-week arc which concluded on November 6. She reprised the role again for an additional stint, which ran from April 14, to April 30, 2015. Davidson later reprised the role briefly on November 21, 2017. In 2018, Stacy Haiduk was cast in the role, appearing from August to October 2018 and for various stints since April 2019. Davidson reprised the role in September 2021 for the Peacock limited series, Days of Our Lives: Beyond Salem. Davidson later reprised the role in November and December 2021 on the main show, sharing the role with Haiduk. Davidson also portrayed the role for the Christmas television film, Days of Our Lives: A Very Salem Christmas in December 2021.

Davidson's performance has been met with critical acclaim, garnering a Daytime Emmy Award nomination for Outstanding Lead Actress in a Drama Series in 1998, before winning the award in 2014. Meanwhile, Haiduk received two consecutive Outstanding Supporting Actress in a Drama Series nominations in 2022 and 2023, followed by a Lead Actress in a Drama Series nomination in 2026.

== Casting ==
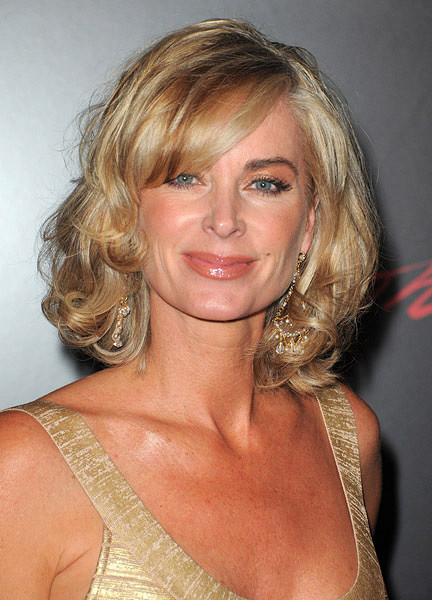
Eileen Davidson originated the role of Kristen from 1993–1998. She returned to the role in 2012, following a 14-year absence, leaving again in 2013, and made guest appearances between 2014 and 2021.

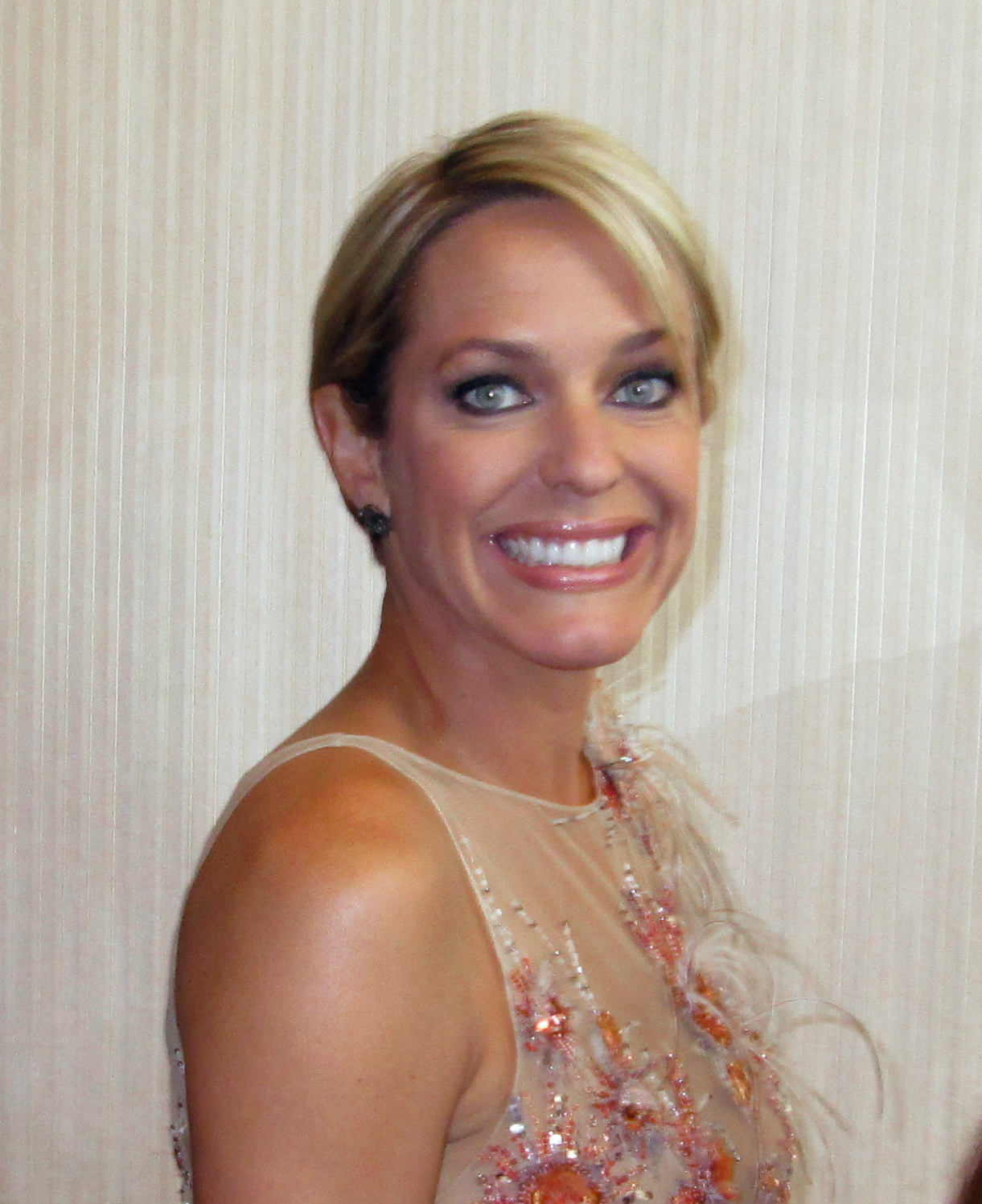
Arianne Zucker co-portrayed the role, alongside Stacy Haiduk, in 2019 when Kristen returned disguised as Nicole Walker — a role which Zucker has portrayed off-and-on since 1998.

The role of Kristen DiMera was played by soap actress Eileen Davidson. Kristen was introduced on May 17, 1993. During Davidson's various runs on the soap, she also portrayed four other characters; Susan Banks (1996–98, 2014, 2017, 2021), Sister Mary Moira Banks (1997–98, 2017), Thomas Banks (1997) and Penelope Kent (1998). She also played Marlena Evans briefly in 1995 and 2021 when Marlena, who was possessed by the Devil, morphed to look like Kristen. Leslie Lunceford portrayed a young Kristen through flashbacks in 1996. Davidson departed the role of Kristen on April 24, 1998. Davidson's five roles earned her a Daytime Emmy nomination for Outstanding Lead Actress in 1998. After five years on Days, Davidson was re-introduced as Ashley Abbott in 1999 on The Young and the Restless, a role she originated from 1982 to 1988. She took over the role from Shari Shattuck, who had portrayed the character from 1996 to 1999. After Davidson's 2006 release from The Young and the Restless, rumors began to circulate that she would return to Days of Our Lives. This speculation was later debunked when it was announced that her Y&R alter-ego would crossover to its sister series The Bold and the Beautiful.

In May 2012, Davidson informed followers on her Twitter page that she had been let go from The Young and the Restless. Davidson further confirmed she did not know why she was let go, but was seeing the positive light from it. It was later announced by Nelson Branco that Sony Pictures Entertainment wanted Davidson on both The Young and the Restless and Days of Our Lives, but that Y&R would not share the actress, leading to Sony terminating her contract with that show. Thus it was announced that Davidson would reprise her roles of Kristen Blake and Susan Banks on the NBC Daytime soap. The Hollywood Reporter later confirmed that Davidson had signed on to return to Days of Our Lives in the role of Kristen, and possibly some of her other characters. In a statement she said, "I'm thrilled to embark on this new adventure at Days and excited to revisit Kristen and who knows who else! Not to mention my old friends in the cast and crew."

Davidson returned on October 11, 2012. In an interview with Megan Masters of TVLine, Davidson discussed what brings her and her Salem alter-ego back to town. She revealed: "I've said in so many scenes, which I've loved, she's had years of intense therapy; a lot of therapy. And she wants to come back now and show the world how she's changed. And how she's grown. And there's also, ah, some business matters in Salem that she needs to attend to."

In July 2013, Soap Opera Digest reported Davidson had decided to exit the series. In a post on her official Facebook page, Davidson said: "Hello! I just wanted to confirm that I have indeed left DOOL. My last day was July 16 but I will be airing until November. I'm taking some time off to enjoy my family however I am not retiring. Not really sure what's next for me work wise. But I am looking forward to figuring it out! Thanks to all of you for your support and love. I've had an incredible time on DOOL this year....." Davidson exited the role during the November 13 episode. That same month, it was announced Davidson would make a one-off appearance, which aired on December 3.

On January 28, 2014, Michael Logan of TV Guide announced that Davidson would return to Days with filming beginning in March, with appearances beginning during the summer. At press time, Davidson's return was described as a "powerful Kristen DiMera story arc." Days of Our Lives co-executive producer Greg Meng added: "The writers have some great things cooking for Kristen and we can’t wait for the fans to see what this will mean for Salem. Must-watch TV at its best!" In June 2014, Davidson announced she signed a two-year deal with The Young and the Restless, which would allow her to continue making appearances as Kristen. Davidson returned on July 28, and concluded her twelve-week stint on November 6, 2014. On November 17, 2014, Access Hollywood broke news Davidson was on-set of the soap, and reprised the role of Kristen for ten episodes, from April 14 to 30, 2015. In November 2017, it was announced Davidson would reprise her portrayal of an unspecified character, and returned as Susan on November 2, 2017. She briefly reprised the role of Kristen on November 21, 2017.

In June 2018, Daytime Confidential announced Stacy Haiduk had been cast in one or more of Davidson's former roles. The following month, Global Television Network announced Haiduk had been cast in the role of Kristen. She made her first appearance on August 21, 2018, and departed on October 31 of that year. Haiduk returned to the role on May 24, 2019. In the May 18, 2020, issue of Soap Opera Digest, it was announced Haiduk would exit the role. In June of the same year, it was announced that Haiduk would reprise the role; she returned during the final moments of the June 26 episode. That August, Soaps.com reported Haiduk would again reprise the role; she returned on September 3. Haiduk last appeared on July 7, 2021.

Later that year, it was announced that Davidson would reprise the role in September 2021 for the Peacock limited series, Days of Our Lives: Beyond Salem, airing from September 6–10 of that year.

Three other actresses have portrayed Kristen, when the character wore masks to look like other characters. Between April and August 2019, Arianne Zucker portrayed the role when Kristen masqueraded as Nicole Walker, whom Zucker has portrayed on and off since 1998. In March 2021, Linsey Godfrey portrayed the role when Kristen masqueraded as Sarah Horton, whom Godfrey portrayed from 2018 to 2021. Later that year, Lauren Koslow portrayed the role when Kristen masqueraded as Kate Roberts, whom Koslow has portrayed since 1996.

== Development ==
While her character on The Young and the Restless Ashley is considered a "heroine", Kristen is described as a "villainess". Davidson said that Kristen is written with "a lot of latitude". During her first run, she developed an unhealthy obsession over her love interest, John Black (Drake Hogestyn). Upon her return, she said that Kristen is "more mature and more together" after "lots of therapy" which has been "intense". Of Kristen's rivalry with Marlena Evans (Deidre Hall), she said "Marlena just doesn’t trust her. No matter what Kristen does it seems like she just can’t convince her that she’s definitely changed. So that’s been the biggest hurdle for Kristen to overcome, is getting Marlena to trust her again." For fourteen years, Kristen had been residing in Europe, and returned to Salem as a businesswoman, wanting to show everyone "how she's changed and how she's grown" although "they haven't forgiven and forgotten" her wrongdoing.

In an interview with Michael Fairman of On Air On Soaps, Davidson opened up about the pressure to re-capture the magic she had with the series 14 years ago. She said that she feels "pressure, but in lots of different ways", "not only with the fans who knew me back then, but the fans who don’t know me now, because I had five years to build that character and all the insanity and the drama was so heightened because of what was going on with Marlena and John at that time." Davidson felt that she wasn't sure whether or not Kristen would "have enough of an impact" upon her return, but praised the writers as "terrific" and hoped that audiences would be receptive of her.

On whether or not she would have a "big storyline", Davidson called it a "multi-leveled and complicated story" which would "bring in lots of different characters". She said that Kristen had scenes with Nicole Walker (Arianne Zucker) who thinks "she is so tough" and doesn't know who is she is dealing with in Kristen. The actress has confessed that she is a lot more like Kristen than Ashley Abbott, "except for the evil part".

== Storylines ==
Kristen Blake was born to Rachel Blake and an unnamed father. She had a brother named Peter. After her parents' presumed deaths, Kristen and Peter were adopted and fostered by Stefano DiMera, with Kristen promising to marry his son, Tony DiMera.

=== 1993–1998 ===
Kristen first appears in Salem as a social worker with wealthy connections. After being attacked by a mugger, she is rescued by a mysterious stranger. Kristen is grateful until she realizes her savior is none other than John Black (Drake Hogestyn), Stefano (Joseph Mascolo)'s longtime rival. Alice Horton (Frances Reid) notices the attraction between the two and sets it up for the two to continue running into one another. They later end up at the Horton family cabin where they make love for the first time. John soon discovers that Stefano raised Kristen and is a father figure to her, but he is still very much in love with Kristen. However, Kristen had promised her ailing father that she would marry Tony DiMera (Thaao Penghlis). When Roman (Wayne Northrop) and Marlena Evans (Deidre Hall)'s daughter Belle is kidnapped by their oldest daughter Sami (Alison Sweeney), Kristen and John pose as a married couple to help get her back. Stefano quickly breaks them up by revealing that John is actually Belle's father. Realizing John will go back to Marlena, Kristen goes through with the marriage in February 1994 only for John to show up at the wedding accusing Stefano of Curtis Reed's (Nick Benedict) murder.

After Stefano is presumably killed by John, Kristen goes through with the wedding to Tony, who is later revealed to be Tony's lookalike, André (Penghlis). Kristen later travels to the family estate in New Orleans, Maison Blanche, where she is taken captive by a very much alive Stefano forcing John to come to the rescue. She later discovers "Tony's" schemes to impregnate her and moves in with John. She and John are about to marry when it is revealed that John is actually a priest; Kristen, a devout Catholic, returns to "Tony." In 1995, when Marlena becomes possessed by a demon, Kristen assists Father John in her exorcism. Later, John and Kristen are reunited after he is released from his vows and her marriage to "Tony" is annulled. Kristen is diagnosed with a medical condition that will cause her to be infertile and she immediately begins trying to have a child. In November 1995, Kristen goes to Aremid as Peter is preparing to marry Jennifer Horton (Melissa Reeves). While there, "Tony" fakes his death and frames John. Though she believes in John's innocence, Peter forces Kristen to testify against him despite John being exonerated.

In 1996, the mysterious Woman in White comes to Salem and moves into the DiMera mansion with Kristen, John and Marlena. Kristen soon discovers she is pregnant and Marlena agrees to move out due to her pregnancy being very high risk. The Woman in White is soon revealed to be her presumed dead mother, Rachel. Realizing John would always love Marlena more than her, Kristen helps Stefano fake her death in a plane crash. John discovers Marlena is alive and goes to rescue her in Paris forcing Rachel and Kristen to follow. In August 1996, Kristen is hospitalized after an explosion kills her mother and she miscarries her child. Stefano soon reappears in Salem and hires Kristen's lookalike Susan Banks (Davidson) to carry a child that Kristen would raise as her and John's. With the help of her father and Peter, Kristen fakes her pregnancy. When Susan goes into labor, Kristen disguised as a nurse is forced to watch as John marries Susan, believing she is really Kristen. Kristen gets custody of the child long enough to name him John Black, Jr. and Susan soon returns to claim her child and husband. Kristen enlists Vivian Alamain (Louise Sorel) and Ivan in keeping Susan locked in a secret room but Marlena puts the pieces together and Kristen is forced to lock her away. When Susan discovers the truth, sick of Kristen's manipulations she locks Kristen inside the room and attempts to marry John until Laura Horton (Jamie Lyn Bauer) confronts her at the wedding. After being rejected by John due to her scheming, Kristen's failed attempt to kill Marlena lands her in jail. After being released on bail, she attempts suicide after hearing about John and Marlena's engagement. She then reveals Marlena's presumed dead husband, Roman Brady (now Josh Taylor); John and Kristen then pretend to marry to keep Roman from becoming suspicious. When John and Stefano ruin her attempt to get back Susan's son, Elvis (aka John, Jr.), she reveals that Roman and Marlena have been seeing one another.

Kristen's attempt to force Susan into giving the child back ends with the death of Susan's identical sister, Penelope Kent. Fearing she'll be charged with murder, Kristen pretends to be Susan and is forced to marry Susan's boyfriend, Edmund Crumb (Adam Caine). In the meantime, "Susan" and Edmund go on a honeymoon and Laura is arrested for Kristen's murder. Edmund admits to Kristen's "murder" and they soon run into the real Susan who explains that Kristen sold her into a harem; it is then revealed that the dead person was Susan's other sibling, Penelope Kent. To get revenge against Kristen, Susan exchanges her freedom for Kristen to be sold to the harem.

=== 2012–2015 ===
Stefano visits Kristen in Europe, where she has been living thanks to Stefano's help. He pleads with her to return to Salem in order to mend the DiMera family. She instantly rejects the idea. After some pushing, Kristen finally agrees to return to Salem for Stefano's sake, however, they agree that she should return alone with Stefano following later. Upon her arrival, she reunites with several Salem residents including her brother EJ (James Scott), John, Marlena and meets and connects with her other brother Chad DiMera (Casey Deidrick).

Despite her repeated attempts to make amends, John and Marlena put on a united front against her. EJ becomes Kristen's closest confidant. After numerous one-on-one encounters with John and after saving his son Brady Black's (Eric Martsolf) life following a mugging, their opinions of her change. Marlena is the only one still suspicious, which leaves her looking paranoid. Kristen and Brady start a secret affair, which Marlena discovers and keeps from John. Once exposed, Kristen reveals to John that she's taking Brady away to break his heart. Brady sides with Kristen, which estranges him from those closest to him. John, Marlena, and Nicole Walker (Arianne Zucker) come up with their own plans to break Kristen's hold on Brady to no avail. Kristen convinces Brady to move into the DiMera mansion, and suggests marriage. After overhearing John and Marlena plotting against them, Brady proposes to Kristen. Brady also starts adoption proceedings. John intends to seduce Kristen and have Brady catch them in the act in order to destroy the relationship. Unbeknownst to him, Kristen has the same plan.

Kristen is blackmailed with a photo by the mugger she hired to attack Brady. Kristen tries to hunt it down. Just as she thinks the photo has been destroyed, Marlena gets her hands on it. Kristen and John meet in a hotel room, sticking to the plan of having sex and getting Brady to catch them. Instead, Kristen discovers that she actually does love Brady and calls it off. On the eve of their wedding, Marlena shows the photo to Brady. The wedding is called off. Furious, Kristen sets her sights on destroying Marlena by having her way with her son Eric Brady (Greg Vaughan). Kristen disguises herself and drugs and has sex with Eric, capturing it on camera. She saves the video on a flash drive. Before she's able to make it public, Brady decides that he wants to work things out between them. Kristen chooses to save the flash drive for leverage. Kristen learns that the drugs she gave Eric may not have rendered his memory erased. Kristen attempts to find and destroy the evidence collected proving that Eric was poisoned. Kristen has a pregnancy scare. She is relieved when she discovers that it's just a false alarm. Brady proposes once again. Marlena and Victor Kiriakis (John Aniston) team up to bring Kristen down before the wedding. Flash drives are accidentally switched. The drive is found by Marlena who gives it to Victor to decrypt. Victor's hacker puts the video file contained on the drive onto a DVD, which Victor presents to Marlena without telling her that it's Eric on the video with Kristen. Marlena plays the video at the wedding. Kristen tries to tell Brady that Eric seduced her. He doesn't buy it, nor does he buy Eric's explanation that he was drugged. After learning what Kristen did, Nicole pays Kristen a visit, telling her that she's going to jail. Kristen makes a run for it. A deadly game of cat and mouse ensues causing both Kristen and Nicole to get into car accidents. Kristen's car is found badly damaged and upside down. Kristen is not found in the car, and a torn piece of fabric from the wedding dress she was wearing is found away from the vehicle. Brady later receives a DVD from Kristen that she made before their wedding and before he announced the details of their honeymoon. He stops watching it midway through and destroys it. Later, Dr. Chyka is seen talking to Kristen on the phone, assuring her that no one will know that she drugged Eric, thus further suggesting that Kristen did indeed survive the car accident.

In 2014, Daniel Jonas (Shawn Christian) is lured to a hotel room in St. Louis by Kristen who has her henchman knock him unconscious and tie him to a chair. When he comes to, Kristen emerges and reveals to him that she has been keeping tabs on Brady, including his relationship with Theresa Donovan (Jen Lilley) and his father's coma. After Daniel refuses to cooperate in her plan to get Brady to St. Louis, Kristen tortures him to get him to agree to take part. Without her present, Daniel manages to untie his restraints and knocks one of Kristen's henchmen unconscious. Upon her return, Daniel manages to take Kristen captive; rendering her his own hostage. He then hides her in the hotel supply closet and ties her up. Later, Daniel takes her back to Salem where she is arrested. EJ refuses to be Kristen's lawyer because of what she did to Sami's brother Eric. Kristen is charged with an array of different counts, including assault, battery, rape and the use of restricted pharmaceuticals. After she pleads not guilty to the charges, Kristen is released on bail and is forced to wear a tracking device. In an attempt to win back Brady, Kristen gives Daniel and Kayla Brady (Mary Beth Evans) part of a formula for a miracle drug that could possibly awaken John from his coma. In exchange for the full formula, Kristen tells Marlena that she will need to talk Eric out of testifying against her in court. Both Marlena and Eric agree to Kristen's terms, resulting in charges being dropped, and Daniel and Kayla receiving the full formula for the miracle drug.

When John begins to show some response to the drug, Kristen attempts to use the news as leverage to mend her relationship with Brady. Kristen also butts heads with Theresa, and begins to suspect that she was the one to put John into his coma, and not Brady, as believed. When John backs the theory that it was Brady who hit him with the poker, Kristen makes it her ultimate mission to prove Theresa's guilt. Kristen bugs both Theresa's sister, Eve Donovan (Kassie DePaiva) and her co-worker Anne Milbauer (Meredith Scott Lynn), in the hopes of catching Theresa in her lie. When she achieves her goal, Kristen presents the audio recording to Brady, who accuses her of tampering with the audio for her own personal gain. In her grief, Kristen turns to Daniel for solace, resulting in the two ending up in bed together. When Brady arrives at Daniel's apartment to make amends, he discovers both Daniel and Kristen in the throes of passion. In the absence of Brady, Kristen and Daniel stop short of having sex, both agreeing that it would be wrong. Brady later confronts Kristen at her hotel room. While he admits that she was telling the truth about Theresa's wrongdoing, he's furious at what she did with Daniel. and makes it known that there is no hope of reconciliation between the two of them. An enraged Kristen heads to the park to calm down, only to overhear Theresa revealing to Anne that she's pregnant with Brady's baby. Kristen, in an act of revenge, orders for Theresa to be kidnapped. Kristen makes one final phone call to Brady letting him know that as she leaves Salem, she's going to be carrying a part of him inside of her. An unknown procedure is prepared for Kristen and an unconscious Theresa by doctors.

Kristen, who is living in Italy, gives birth to Theresa and Brady's baby. The baby, named Christopher, is born with an autoimmune deficiency and requires a bone marrow transplant. Kristen orders that Brady and Theresa's blood be drawn in order to find a suitable donor. Melanie (Molly Burnett) begins investigating and eventually fits the clues together and reveals to Brady that Theresa was pregnant, he is the father, and that Kristen has stolen the baby. Kristen is informed that Theresa is a suitable match for the baby and orders her henchman, Clint (Lucas Kerr) to bring her to her. Brady sets out to find Kristen. He gets her location from Victor. Despite his objections, Melanie decides to stowaway on Brady's private plane, providing backup in his confrontation with Kristen. When Brady confronts Kristen with the allegation that she's stolen his child, she vehemently denies it. Brady searches the castle and leaves empty handed. Melanie sneaks into the castle and finds the baby in a secret room. Kristen catches Melanie and uses her to lure Brady back to the castle. Kristen presents the baby as Daniel Jonas'. Unsure if Kristen is telling the truth, Brady demands a paternity and maternity test. Kristen takes Brady and Melanie captive. Thinking that she's being taken on a luxury vacation, Theresa arrives at the castle with Clint. Kristen drugs Theresa and has her taken to the baby's room for the bone marrow procedure. Kristen gives Brady one last look at his child and leaves him with Melanie to be executed. Kristen goes to leave the castle with the baby and finds Marlena, who accidentally grabbed hold of the wrong address to find Paul (Christopher Sean) and John, at her doorstep. Melanie and Brady manage to subdue and kill Clint. Theresa overpowers Dr. Mandrake. Marlena senses that Kristen is up to no good and is determined to find out what she's hiding. Kristen pulls out a gun and the two end up fighting for it. Brady barges in and Kristen, now distracted, is catapulted by Marlena through a glass window several feet above a bay. Despite a body not being found, Kristen is presumed dead by Brady, the Italian police and the entire citizens of Salem.

=== 2017–present ===
In November 2017, Kristen appears in Memphis, Tennessee, still alive. She secretly slips into Will Horton's bedroom at Susan's home. Laughing to herself, she taunts the thought of Susan tricking Will into believing he was EJ, when she could have had the real EJ the entire time. Months later, Kristen (Stacy Haiduk) returns to Salem — disguised as Susan — and turns up for John and Marlena's wedding. A drugged and barely coherent Sami exposes Kristen's true identity at the ceremony. Kristen gives Sami a gun, and offers to tell her the whereabouts of EJ, provided she shoots John. Eric rushes for the gun, causing it to fire, leaving Marlena critically wounded. It was later revealed that Marlena was shot by another gun. Kristen lures Brady to a hotel room only to be tracked down by Eve (Kassie DePaiva), Sami, and Paul. A fight breaks out between Kristen and Paul. The pair end up crashing through a window resulting in Paul unable to walk and Kristen on the run. Kristen turns to her brother Stefan (Tyler Christopher) for help. Stefan hides her in the tunnels located beneath the DiMera mansion. Kristen visits Marlena in the hospital intending to end her life once and for all. She quickly discovers it's Hattie Adams (Deidre Hall) and not Marlena in the hospital room. Kristen convinces Brady to run away with her and the two head to Nashville where she's been running a secret facility for Dr. Rolf (William Utay) to conduct his experiments of bringing the dead back to life. When a fire breaks out at the Nashville facility, Kristen decides to stay behind. One of the patients, EJ DiMera, is rescued by Sami. A firefighter reports that no survivors were found.

Kristen, alive and well, returns to Salem by disguising herself as Nicole Walker (Arianne Zucker). She is helped, once again, by Xander Kiriakis (Paul Telfer) in carrying out her plan, which involves trying to seduce Brady while also using Nicole's identity to manipulate Stefan into giving her a place in the family business. Kristen talks her brother Tony, who is alive and still in love with his former wife Anna (Leann Hunley), into marrying her as Nicole in a scheme to take back DiMera Enterprises from Stefan (Brandon Barash) and Gabi Hernandez (Camila Banus). Her scheme and true identity is exposed at John and Marlena's wedding anniversary celebration. While in custody, Kristen admits to Brady that Nicole and her daughter Holly are alive. After making a deal with the D.A., Kristen is set free. She once again sets her sights on getting back with Brady. Kristen discovers that Sarah Horton (Linsey Godfrey) is pregnant and has decided to have an abortion. With the assistance of Dr. Rolf and Xander, she decides to steal Sarah's embryo and implant it in herself, in an attempt to pass the baby off as her own with Brady. Rolf informs Kristen that she is already pregnant after sleeping with Brady while impersonating Nicole, thus making the procedure on Sarah both unnecessary and impossible. Kristen and Brady are led to believe that their newborn baby daughter, Rachel Isabella, named after Kristen's mother, Rachel Blake, and Brady's mother, Isabella Toscano, died after birth when in reality the baby was switched at birth by Xander under orders from his uncle, Victor to spare the knowledge that his wife Maggie Horton is responsible for the deaths of both Adrienne Johnson and her own granddaughter, Mackenzie; Rachel is being raised as Mackenzie Horton.

A year later, Kristen is shown living as a nun in the same convent as Lani Price (Sal Stowers), who she attempts to help cope with the pain she feels for calling off her wedding. The two return to Salem after an attempt on Kristen's life, and become friends. Kristen is unaware that her baby is alive and has developed cancer and will need a bone marrow transplant from her parents. Mackenzie's life is saved when Gabi donates her bone marrow to escape a prison sentence, but Kristen does not learn the truth until Nicole conducts her own investigation; Nicole admits that as much as she hates Kristen, she also knows a mother's pain of being separated from her child. Kristen swears to take revenge on the Kiriakis family in particular Victor and Xander for stealing Rachel Isabella from her. After stabbing Victor, Brady took the blame and went to jail. Kristen later tells Lani the truth about Victor's stabbing. Later, Kristen receive a phone call from Rex Brady (Kyle Lowder) and with the help of her nephew and Lani's brother Theo Carver (Kyler Pettis), she learns that Rachel and Sarah are in Paris by tracking Rex's phone. After finding Sarah and Rachel at the train station, she confronts Sarah over taking Rachel, then after her heartbreaking plea, she convinces Sarah to give her baby back, she is then reunited with Rachel after Sarah hands her over. Kristen and Rachel is later reunited with Brady, but Kristen tells Brady that she can't go back to Salem, because of her warrant for stabbing Victor. Then, Brady tells her to take Rachel and go on the run; she leaves the train station with Rachel after a heartfelt goodbye with Brady. She secretly returns to Salem on Lani's wedding day, and eventually reunites with Brady and Chad. Kristen eventually agrees to serve time in prison for the stabbing, but when she suspects Chloe Lane (Nadia Bjorlin) of trying to seduce Brady, she escapes and threatens the former with a gun before Chad and Tony persuade her to surrender to authorities. Later, she gets Susan Banks to switch identities with her so she can spy on Chloe, only for her ruse to be discovered by Sarah when she sees Kristen out of her Susan disguise. A desperate Kristen then ties up Sarah and crafts a mask of her face so she can drive a wedge between her and Xander (now her fiancé) by pretending to cheat on him with Rex. The plan succeeds, and Kristen ships the real Sarah off to her secret island. She then uses another mask to impersonate Kate Roberts after the latter also discovers her masquerading as Susan; Kate is ultimately hospitalized with injuries after a car accident that also injures Brady. Kristen goes into hiding to escape arrest for her crimes.

In Zurich, Switzerland, Kristen (Eileen Davidson), disguised as Sister Mary Moira, visits Anna DiMera (Leann Hunley), who has been visiting Carrie and Austin. While there, Kristen steals a necklace that Austin bid on for Carrie. The necklace contains the gems missing from the Alamainian Peacock. Kristen is later tracked down by Billie Reed (Lisa Rinna) and her ISA partner, Kyle Graham (Peter Porte), at an outdoor café. After the two trade barbs, Kristen runs off dropping the necklace, which is retrieved by Billie.

== Reception ==
Davidson has received a number of honors for her portrayal of Kristen, including a Daytime Emmy Award nomination for Outstanding Lead Actress in a Drama Series in 1998, winning the award in 2014. Davidson also earned Soap Opera Digest Award nomination for Outstanding Lead Actress in 1997 and 1998. Kristen's return storyline was also voted the best of 2013 in several soap publications, such as Daytime Confidential.

In 2020, Charlie Mason from Soaps She Knows placed Kristen at #10 on their list of the 35 most memorable characters from Days of Our Lives, calling her a "she-devil brought so vividly to life by Eileen Davidson (Ashley, The Young and the Restless) and Stacy Haiduk" who "deserves more than one spot on this list when you consider her expansive family." In 2024, Mason from included Kristen in his list of the worst mothers in American soap operas, writing, "Far be it from us to point fingers, but if you, on the other hand, wanted to blame Stefano's daughter for the fact that her daughter Rachel has turned out to be such an abominable bad seed, we might quietly cheer you on from the sidelines".
