= Lee DuMonde =

- Days of Our Lives character
- Portrayed by: Brenda Benet
- Duration: 1979–82
- First appearance: July 24, 1979
- Last appearance: April 20, 1982
- Created by: Elizabeth Harrower
- Introduced by: Betty Corday; Al Rabin
In-universe information
- Other names: Emily DuMonde; Lee Williams
- Occupation: Psychiatrist
- Husband: Douglas Williams (1979–81)
- Daughters: Renée DuMonde

Lee DuMonde is a fictional character from Days of Our Lives portrayed by Brenda Benet from 1979 to 1982. The character was written out after Benet's suicide in 1982.

== Casting ==
Lee was played by actress Brenda Benet. The character exited the soap after Benet killed herself in April 1982. Benet's co-star Bill Hayes, who played Lee's love interest Doug Williams, and his wife Susan Seaforth Hayes (who played Lee's rival Julie Olson Williams), explained that the soap's producer knew that Benet had lost a lot of weight and was "going downhill physically" prior to her death.

== Storylines ==
Lee is a gold digger and she came to Salem when her boyfriend Byron Carmichael died and left his fortune to his half-brother Doug Williams. Lee married Doug and kept him from his true love Julie Olson. After Lee had a stroke, her sister Renée DuMonde came to town. Lee could not save her marriage to Doug and he divorced her. Renée began dating Tony DiMera and Lee warned her to stay away from him. When Renée read her diary she found out that Lee wasn't her sister but her mother and that her father was Stefano DiMera. Now that Tony was her brother she married someone else, but then Daphne DiMera revealed that Tony wasn't really Stefano's son. Renée resented Lee for lying to her and she left town as she could not bear that.

== Reception ==
A writer from UPI called Lee "scheming" and "often hysterical". Charlie Mason from Soaps She Knows called Lee a "supervixen" and wrote that whilst "viewers loved to hate her — her conniving character was, after all, coming between megapopular Doug and Julie Williams — she was as integral a part of the show as the hourglass". He added that Benet "had a vivacity that made — that still makes — it impossible to imagine her being gone".
