= Where the Heart Is (American TV series) =

- Created by: Lou Scofield; Margaret DePriest
- Starring: James Mitchell; Diana van der Vlis; Louise Shaffer; Delphi Harrington; David Cryer; Diana Walker; Gregory Abels; Bibi Osterwald; Zohra Lampert
- Country of origin: United States
- No. of episodes: 907

Production
- Camera setup: Multiple-camera
- Running time: 22–25 minutes

Original release
- Network: CBS
- Release: September 8, 1969 – March 23, 1973

Where the Heart Is is an American soap opera telecast on the CBS television network from September 8, 1969 to March 23, 1973. Created by Lou Scofield and Margaret DePriest, the program ran for 25 minutes, the remaining five minutes of its timeslot ceded to a CBS news break.

Scofield and DePriest were the original head writers. A year after the soap's premiere, they were succeeded by Pat Falken Smith. In 1972, Smith was replaced by Claire Labine and Paul Avila Mayer. The series was produced by Tom Donovan and directed by Richard Dunlap.

== Storylines ==
Set in the fictional town of Northcross, Connecticut, Where the Heart Is focuses on the sexual and psychological intrigues of the dysfunctional Hathaway family. Although some believe that the serial was patterned after Grace Metalious’ scandalous novel Peyton Place (and subsequent television adaptation), the serial was actually CBS’ attempt to create a psychosexual, family melodrama popularized by NBC's Days of Our Lives. With such prurient themes as unabashed adultery, out-of-wedlock babies, and vaguely incestuous love triangles, the serial's irreverent, fast-paced stories were in contrast to the other serials on CBS which were staid and conservative.

The serial opened with the death of pious Hathaway family patriarch Judge Daniel Hathaway. Judge Hathaway had three adult children: Julian (James Mitchell), a professor of literature at the local university, Kate (Diana van der Vlis), a sympathetic but sexually repressed law student, and Allison (Louise Shaffer), the liberated feminist black sheep of the family. In the first episode, Allison returned to Northcross for her father's funeral, having left town years before with her sister's fiancée Roy Archer (Stephen Joyce). Intrigued by the new family dynamic, Allison and Roy decided to settle down in the Hathaway mansion, much to the chagrin of Kate, Julian, and the family's cantankerous housekeeper Stella O'Brien (Bibi Osterwald).

Having never gained his father's love, Julian sought affection elsewhere, developing an unfortunate affinity for the many young women he taught at Northcross University. When the serial began, Julian had recently married nubile Mary (Diana Walker), his adult son Michael's former girlfriend.

Michael was pursued by the amoral Vicky Lucas (Robyn Millan), even though she knew he still carried a torch for Mary. Vicky, the daughter of Ed Lucas (Joseph Mascolo) the owner of a restaurant in Northcross, called the Starlight, managed to seduce Michael, and when she conveniently became pregnant, he married her. Vicky attempted to become the sort of wife in which Michael could take pride, even getting lessons in “style” from his snobbish Aunt Allison. However, when Vicky overheard her husband profess his love for his stepmother, she angrily drove off in an ice storm. The car crashed, and she miscarried.

Vicky exploited Michael and Mary's guilt for weeks by faking paralysis, but when Mary accidentally discovered her standing, the two rivals had a fight at the top of a staircase. Mary, who was also pregnant, fell down the stairs and languished in coma. Undaunted, Vicky slipped into Mary's hospital room and tried to unplug her respirator, but was caught. Vicky was confined to a state mental hospital, while Mary, now recuperated from the accident, gave birth to Julian's son and Michael's half-brother, Daniel.

Julian's hard-hearted sister Allison didn’t find success in love either. After her husband Roy died, Allison married Dr. Hugh Jessup (Rex Robbins and David Cryer), who had problems with commitment. Allison's demanding nature sent him into the arms of Kate Hathaway's best friend the confused but sweet-natured Christine Cameron (Terry O'Connor and Delphi Harrington). When Christine became pregnant, Hugh filed for divorce and left stony Allison, who was aghast that Christine seemed to elicit sympathy from most of their family and friends. After giving birth to Hugh's illegitimate daughter Katina, Christine became the target of harassing phone calls and insidious notes, and everyone believed that Allison was her rival's stalker. It transpired that the real culprit was Christine's kindly, old neighbor Will Watts (Robert Symonds), a deranged psychopath who had murdered his adulterous wife decades before. Envisioning Christine as his dead wife, Will spirited her away to an isolated cabin, where Hugh managed to rescue her just as Will was ready to kill her. Christine had a nervous collapse and had to be hospitalized. Meanwhile, a bored Hugh cheated on Christine with ex-wife Allison, who decided she wanted Hugh back. While she was in the hospital, the boutique she owned was run by Amy Snowden (Clarice Blackburn), a friend to everyone in Northcross.

Kate, Julian and Allison's sensible sister, married stalwart Steve Prescott (Laurence Luckinbill, Ron Harper) after a long courtship. Steve quickly developed amnesia and became involved with single mother Ellie Jardin (Zohra Lampert). Steve's memory eventually returned, and when Ellie was murdered, he and Kate adopted Ellie's mute son Peter (Michael Bersell). Peter's muteness was psychosomatic, having developed after he witnessed a deadly fire involving his aunt, Margaret Jardin (Rue McClanahan), who had an incestuous attachment to her brother Robert (Keith Charles), Peter's father. When Robert failed to return his sister's feelings, she ran him down with a car and killed him. Peter also died in a tragic accident, and Kate, unable to cope with all the tragedy around her, began to display increasingly erratic behavior, hearing voices and acting lewdly. Kate feared that she was dying from the same brain aneurysm that killed her mother, but in reality she had developed a truculent split personality called Betty.

In the show's final year, Julian fell into a steamy affair with conniving student Liz Harris Rainey (Tracy Brooks Swope). After he rejected her, Liz, secretly pregnant with his child, married Michael. Now ensconced in the Hathaway home, Liz tortured Julian, constantly threatening to tell Mary and Michael about their affair. She also instigated vicious rumors on the university campus that Julian and Mary were engaged in a ménage à trois with Loretta Jardin (Alice Drummond), Peter's other aunt, a recovering alcoholic high school teacher. Meanwhile, Liz's father John Rainey (Peter MacLean) became involved with Christine Cameron, who was caught in a court battle with Hugh and Allison for custody of Katina. Christine sought therapy with psychiatrist Dr. Adrienne Harris (Priscilla Pointer), unaware that she was John's estranged wife. Desperate for reconciliation with John, Adrienne subtly manipulated Christine into having a complete nervous breakdown, forcing her to be institutionalized.

During the serial's last week, all of Liz and Adrienne's machinations were exposed, and they decided to move in together to rebuild their lives, without Michael and John. Mary, who left Julian after discovering that Liz was pregnant with his child, forgave him. Christine was released from the psychiatric hospital, reunited with John, and happily learned that Hugh and Allison agreed to share custody of Katina with her. Kate realized that her psychological problems stemmed from the repressive moral code inflicted upon her for so long by the late Judge Hathaway. Before she entered intensive therapy, Steve promised to whisk her away for a long, relaxing vacation in the Caribbean. Julian, who had always blamed Michael for his mother's death in childbirth, went to visit Michael, who was falling in love with the now reformed Vicky (now played by Lisa Richards), the new proprietor of a country health food store called Back to Nature. Father and son agreed to put the past behind them and concentrate on the future. They were left in a warm embrace as the scene faded to black for the last time.

== Ratings and cancellation ==
Although Where the Heart Is achieved fairly healthy ratings, averaging a 6.7 and 26 share for its three-and-a-half-year run, it was typically the lowest-rated soap on CBS’ daytime schedule. Advertisers weren’t thrilled with the show, either, because demographics suggested the serial's attempt to attract a younger, less desirable cult audience.

In February 1973, CBS found itself locked in a battle with NBC for daytime ratings supremacy, and went on to cancel Where the Heart Is and another “underachiever,” Love Is a Many Splendored Thing, in a bid to bring up the daypart's overall rating. As one industry insider revealed about the cancellations: "It was a matter of pride, CBS didn't like being third in the ratings. So, rather than struggle to improve the quality of these shows, it just canceled them."

Where the Heart Is and the newsbreak that followed it (which later moved to 10:55 a.m.) were replaced on CBS' daytime schedule by The Young and the Restless, which would become the most popular TV soap opera in America for three decades running, and is still on the air as of 2025.

== Surviving episodes ==
All 907 episodes of Where the Heart Is were recorded on videotape at the CBS Broadcast Center Studio #44 in New York. Like most soap operas of the late 60s/early 70s, it fell victim to the industry practice of wiping tapes for re-use. Although the master tapes for Where the Heart Is were erased, some rare kinescopes of the series remain in the possession of private collectors.

Only seven videotapes of the soap are confirmed to exist. These are non-circulating copies stored at the UCLA Television Archives. The archived episodes were telecast: March 8, 16, and 24, 1971, April 1 and 9, 1971, and March 12 and 20, 1973.
