= Michelle Poteet Lisanti =

American television soap opera writer

Michelle Poteet Lisanti is an American television soap opera writer. Lisanti, formerly a member of Writers Guild of America West, left and maintained financial core status during the 2007–08 Writers Guild of America strike.

== Positions held ==
Another World

- Screenwriter: 1995 – 1996

Days of Our Lives

- Head Writer: October 10, 1980 – October 20, 1981
- Breakdown Writer: 1987 – 1994, June 11, 2009–present

Guiding Light

- Screenwriter: 1984 – 1985

One Life to Live (hired by Lorraine Broderick)

- Screenwriter: 2001 – May 18, 2009

Search for Tomorrow

- Screenwriter: 1985
- Co-Head Writer: 1985 – 1986

Sunset Beach

- Associate Head Writer (entire run, 1997–1999)

Texas

- Screenwriter: 1981 – 1982

== HW History ==
Preceded by Nina Laemmle	Head Writer of Days of Our Lives (with Gary Tomlin: October 20, 1980 – October 20, 1981); October 10, 1980 – October 20, 1981	Succeeded by Pat Falken Smith

== Awards and nominations ==
Daytime Emmy Award 2008; Best Writing; "One Life To Live" 2012; Best Writing; "Days of Our Lives"

Nominations

- 2002 & 2006; Best Writing; One Life To Live
- 1996; Best Writing; Another World
- 1994; Best Writing; Days of our Lives
- 1985; Best Writing; Guiding Light

Writers Guild of America Award Nominations

- 2003 & 2005 season; One Life To Live
- 1997 season; Sunset Beach
- 1987, 1991 & 1993 season; Days of our Lives
- 1984 season; Guiding Light
