= Margaret DePriest =

American actress (1931–2025)

- Born: April 19, 1931
- Died: September 29, 2025 (aged 94)
- Occupations: Actress, writer
- Years active: 1955–1999
- Spouse: Paul Price

Margaret DePriest (April 19, 1931 – September 29, 2025) was an American actress and daytime serial writer. She was nominated for five Daytime Emmy Award awards for her writing and in 1965 won an Obie Award for Best Actress for her performance in The Place for Chance.

== Life and career ==
DePriest began her career as an actress both onstage and on television. Her acting credits included a contract role as Abby Cameron #1 on The Edge of Night from 1965 to 1966. She also played social worker Mrs. Berger on the NBC serial The Doctors.

In the mid-1960s, she began writing The Edge of Night. In 1969, she co-created and was co-head writer of CBS Daytime's Where the Heart Is.

She served as head writer for several serials, including General Hospital, Days of Our Lives, All My Children, Another World, One Life to Live, and Sunset Beach.

DePriest was married to writer Paul Price. She died on September 29, 2025, at the age of 94.

== Positions held ==
The Doctors

- Head writer: February – September 1976

All My Children

- Head writer: 1989

Another World

- Head writer: March 1986 - January 1988, May 1996 - January 1997

Days of Our Lives

- Associate head writer: October 21, 1981 - April 19, 1982
- Head writer: April 20, 1982 - September 21, 1984
- Co-head writer (with Sheri Anderson and Thom Racina): September 24 - October 25, 1984

General Hospital

- Co-head writer (with Pat Falken Smith): 1980 - 1981

The Edge of Night

- Co-head writer (with Lou Scofield): mid-1960s

One Life to Live

- Associate head writer: 1990
- Co-head writer (with Craig Carlson and Leah Laiman): 1990 - 1991

Sunset Beach

- Co-head writer with Christopher Whitesell: August 1998 - December 1999

Where the Heart Is

- Co-Creator (with Lou Scofield)
- Co-head writer (with Lou Scofield): 1969 - 1970

== Awards and nominations ==
Daytime Emmy Award

- Nomination, 1992, Best Writing, One Life to Live
- Nomination, 1990, Best Writing, All My Children
- Nomination, 1985, Best Writing, Days of our Lives
- Nomination, 1984, Best Writing, Days of our Lives
- Nomination, 1985, Best Writing, General Hospital

Writers Guild of America Award

- Nomination, 1998, Best Writing, Another World
