= Pat Falken Smith =

American screenwriter

Pat Falken Smith (January 21, 1926 – May 19, 2001) was a television writer, best known for her being head writer of several soap operas, including General Hospital and Days of Our Lives.

== Positions held ==
Where the Heart Is

- Head Writer: 1970-1972

Days of Our Lives

- Head Writer: May 7, 1975 - April 19, 1977, October 21, 1981 - April 16, 1982
- Script Writer: 1966, 1968-1971, 1972-1975
- Story Consultant: 1987-1988

General Hospital

- Head Writer: August 6, 1979- September 18, 1981, March 18, 1985- December 31, 1986, December 12, 1988- May 5, 1989

Guiding Light

- Head Writer: September 27 – November 26, 1982

Ryan's Hope

- Head Writer: November 21, 1983 – February 15, 1985

== Career ==
Smith served as head writer for Days of our Lives from 1975-77, where she earned a salary of $285,000 a year, considered very high for that time, which included $35,000 just for "thinking creatively."

She won the "Outstanding Writing in a Drama Series" Daytime Emmy Award for Days of our Lives in 1976 and 1977. She returned to Days of our Lives in 1981 where she introduced the Brady and DiMera families, as well as Abe Craver, who is the longest running African American character in daytime.

Smith succeeded Douglas Marland as head writer of ABC Daytime's General Hospital from 1979 to 1981. With Smith as writer and Gloria Monty as producer, the show remained at the top of the daytime ratings roster. Smith was reported to be the highest paid writer in broadcasting history when she left General Hospital in 1981, at $1 million per year.

Smith then went to Guiding Light in 1982, where she again succeeded Marland as head writer. Her stint at GL was short, lasting only one cycle of 13 weeks. She went on to serve as head writer of Ryan's Hope before returning as head writer of General Hospital two more times in the 1980s. (1985-1986, 1988-1989).

== Death ==
Pat Falken Smith died in Los Angeles, on May 19, 2001, aged 75.

== Awards and nominations ==
Daytime Emmy Awards

WINS

- (1976; Best Writing; Days of Our Lives)

NOMINATIONS

- (1975, 1977 & 1978; Best Writing; Days of Our Lives)
- (1981 & 1986; Best Writing; General Hospital)

Writers Guild of America Award

NOMINATIONS

- (1975, 1976, 1977 & 1978 seasons; Days of Our Lives)

== Notes and references ==
Preceded by William J. Bell	Head Writer of Days of Our Lives; 1975 - 1977	Succeeded by Ann Marcus
Preceded by Douglas Marland	Head Writer of General Hospital; 1979 - 1981; 1985 - 1986; 1988 - 1989	Succeeded by Robert J. Shaw
Preceded by Gary Tomlin; Michelle Poteet Lisanti	Head Writer of Days of Our Lives; 1981 - 1982	Succeeded by Margaret DePriest; Sheri Anderson
Preceded by Douglas Marland (no HW listed before she joined)	Head Writer of Guiding Light; 1982	Succeeded by L. Virginia Browne; Gene Palumbo
Preceded by Claire Labine; Paul Avila Mayer	Head Writer of Ryan's Hope; December 1983 - February 1985	Succeeded by Millee Taggart; Tom King
