= Al Rabin =

- Born: January 26, 1936; Waukegan, Illinois, U.S.
- Died: August 14, 2012 (aged 76); California
- Occupation: TV producer
- Known for: Work on Days of Our Lives

Al Rabin (January 26, 1936 – August 14, 2012) was a producer of soap operas, specifically known for his work on Days of Our Lives. Rabin served in multiple capacities in his sixteen years at Days, first as a director and then as a supervising executive producer to Mrs. Ted Corday, and from 1985 to 1992 as a co-executive producer.

Rabin retired from television work in the mid-1990s. His contributions earned him and the show eight Daytime Emmy Award nominations for outstanding direction and outstanding drama series.

Rabin died in August, 2012. He was memorialized at the end of the August 24, 2012 episode of Days of Our Lives.

== Executive Producing Tenure ==
Preceded by Betty Corday; H. Wesley Kenney	Executive Producer of Days of Our Lives (with Betty Corday: January 21, 1980 – December 31, 1987) (with Ken Corday: May 12, 1986 – March 6, 1989); January 21, 1980 – March 6, 1989	Succeeded by Ken Corday; Shelley Curtis
Preceded by Ken Corday; Shelley Curtis	Executive Producer of Days of Our Lives (with Ken Corday); December 1989 – April 20, 1992	Succeeded by Ken Corday; Tom Langan
