= Betty Corday =

American actress and TV executive producer (1912-1987)

- Betty Corday with husband Ted in the 1940s
- Born: Elizabeth Shay; March 21, 1912
- Died: November 17, 1987 (aged 75); Los Angeles, California, U.S.
- Known for: Days of Our Lives
- Spouse: Ted Corday (m. 1942; died 1966)
- Children: 2, including Ken Corday

Betty Corday (born Elizabeth Shay; March 21, 1912 – November 17, 1987) was a Broadway dramatic actress and long-time American television producer. She co-created and executive produced the long running NBC drama Days of Our Lives from 1966 until her death in 1987.

== Biography ==
=== Stage ===
Corday had previously been a Broadway stage actress, starring in "one flop after another" before marrying her husband, a Winnipeg-born lawyer. They were married from 1942 until his death in 1966. They had two sons, Chris and Ken.

=== Radio ===
Corday produced such radio soaps as Pepper Young's Family and Young Dr. Malone.

=== Television ===
Becoming executive producer after the death of her husband, Ted Corday (credited as Mrs. Ted Corday), she was the executive producer of Days of Our Lives from 1966 to 1985. She semi-retired in 1985, turning control over to her son, Ken. She kept the title of executive producer until her death in November 1987. In addition to her work on Days of our Lives, Corday was a consultant for The Young and the Restless.

== Death ==
Betty Corday died at age 75 on November 17, 1987, from respiratory failure at Cedars-Sinai Medical Center, Los Angeles, California.

== Executive producing tenure ==
Preceded by Ted Corday	Executive Producer of Days of Our Lives (with H. Wesley Kenney: April 20, 1977 – January 18, 1980) (with Al Rabin: January 21, 1980 – December 31, 1987) (with Ken Corday: May 12, 1986 – December 31, 1987); August 3, 1966 – December 31, 1987	Succeeded by Ken Corday; Al Rabin
