= Ken Corday =

American composer and producer

- Born: Kenneth Robert Corday; June 16, 1950 (age 76); New York City, New York, U.S.
- Education: University of California, Santa Cruz; San Jose State University
- Occupations: Producer, music composer
- Known for: Days of Our Lives
- Spouse: Sherry Williams (m. 1987–2024) Paula Fabiana Corday (m. 2025)
- Children: 3
- Parent(s): Ted Corday; Betty Corday

Kenneth Robert Corday (born June 16, 1950) is an American television soap opera producer and music composer. He is the son of Ted Corday and Betty Corday, the co-creators of Days of Our Lives. His production company, Corday Productions, owns 1% of The Young and the Restless while Sony Pictures Television owns the majority of the serial.

== Early life ==
Corday graduated from the University of California, Santa Cruz in 1977 with a master's degree in music composition.

== Positions held ==
- 1977-78: Production assistant
- 1979; Assistant producer and music composer
- 1981: CEO, Corday Productions Inc. (from May 1986 to present: executive producer)
- 1988: Head writer (during the Writers Guild of America strike)
- 2021: Executive producer of the Peacock-exclusive Days of Our Lives spinoff, Days of Our Lives: Beyond Salem.

== Awards and nominations ==
Corday has been nominated for 16 Daytime Emmys. Corday won the Daytime Emmy Award for Music Direction and Composition For a Drama Series in 1990 and 1997, and was nominated in the same category in 2006 and 2007.

He was nominated for the Daytime Emmy for Outstanding Daytime Drama Series in 1983, 1984, 1985, 1995, 1996, 1997, 1998, 1999, 2009 and 2012. He won the 2007 Film & TV Music Award for Best Score for a Television Daytime Drama for his work on the series. In 2017 he was honored with a star on the Hollywood Walk of Fame.

== Personal life ==
He married Sherry Williams in 1987; divorced in 2024; the couple has three children. He married Paula Fabiana Corday in August 2025.
