= List of Days of Our Lives characters introduced in the 1990s =

A list of notable characters from the NBC soap opera Days of Our Lives that significantly impacted storylines and debuted between 1990 and 1999.

== Stephanie Johnson ==
Stephanie Johnson
- Days of Our Lives character
- Portrayed by: Amanda and Jessica Gunnarson (1990–1992); Shayna Rose (2006–2007); Shelley Hennig (2007–2017); Abigail Klein (2022–present)
- Duration: 1990–1992; 2006–2011; 2017; 2022–present
- First appearance: February 19, 1990
- Created by: Richard J. Allen and Anne Schoettle
- Introduced by: Ken Corday and Al Rabin (1990); Ken Corday and Stephen Wyman (2006); Ken Corday, Albert Alarr and Greg Meng (2017)
- Spin-off appearances: Days of Our Lives: Beyond Salem (2022)
In-universe information
- Other names: Stephanie Kay Johnson
- Occupation: Accountant; Racecar Driver
- Family: Brady; Johnson
- Parents: Steve Johnson; Kayla Brady
- Brothers: Joey Johnson
- Half-brothers: Tripp Dalton
- Spouse: Alex Kiriakis (m. 2026)
- Stepdaughters: Kelsey Wesley
- Grandparents: Duke Johnson; Jo Johnson; Shawn Brady; Caroline Brady
- Aunts and uncles: Jack Deveraux; Adrienne Johnson; Roman Brady; Bo Brady; Kimberly Brady; Frankie Brady (adoptive); Max Brady (adoptive)
- First cousins: Carrie Brady; Sami Brady; Eric Brady; Rex Brady; Cassie Brady; Andrew Donovan IV; Theresa Donovan; Gwen Rizczech; Abigail Deveraux; JJ Deveraux; Joey Kiriakis (adoptive); Victor Kiriakis II (adoptive); Sonny Kiriakis; Shawn-Douglas Brady; Chelsea Brady; Zack Brady; Ciara Brady

Stephanie Johnson was created by head writer Richard J. Allen, and was originated by actresses Amanda and Jessica Gunnarson. Shayna Rose briefly stepped into the role in 2006–07. The role was taken over by Shelley Hennig in 2007. Henning was nominated for a Daytime Emmy for her role as Stephanie, in the category of Outstanding Younger Actress in a Daytime Drama. Her last airdate as Stephanie was on April 6, 2011. In December 2016, it was revealed that Hennig would reprise the role in a guest capacity, with episodes airing in February 2017. On May 2, 2022, it was announced by Soap Opera Network that Abigail Klein had been cast as Stephanie for Days of Our Lives: Beyond Salem, and would later join Days of Our Lives as a series regular.

Stephanie is the daughter of supercouple, Steve Johnson and Kayla Brady. She is the ex-fiancée of Philip Kiriakis, and Nathan Horton. Stephanie is introduced in 1990 while Kayla is serving jail time. She and Kayla depart the serial in 1992, with a teenage Stephanie, played by Shayna Rose, returning in 2006. Shayna Rose departed the series in 2007. A new looking Stephanie, played by Shelley Hennig arrives in Salem in 2007 with parents Steve Johnson, and Kayla Brady. Hennig has portrayed the role from 2007 to 2011, even being nominated in 2010 for a Daytime Emmy in Outstanding Younger Actress. Despite only airing into April 2011, Hennig managed to receive another Daytime Emmy nomination for Outstanding Younger Actress in 2012.

== Lawrence Alamain ==
Lawrence Alamain
- Days of Our Lives character
- Portrayed by: Michael Sabatino; Evan Miller (1990; flashbacks); Jeremy Kutner (1991; flashbacks)
- Duration: 1990–93; 2009–11
- First appearance: September 11, 1990
- Last appearance: August 3, 2011
- Created by: Richard J. Allen and Anne Schoettle
- Introduced by: Ken Corday and Al Rabin (1990); Ken Corday and Gary Tomlin (2009)
- Spin-off appearances: Days of Our Lives: One Stormy Night (1992); Days of Our Lives: Night Sins (1993)
In-universe information
- Other names: Lawrence James Alamain
- Occupation: Businessman
- Family: Alamain
- Parents: Leopold Alamain; Philomena Alamain
- Brothers: John Black (adoptive)
- Wife: Jennifer Horton (1990–91); Carly Manning (1993–2009)
- Sons: Nicholas Alamain
- Aunts: Vivian Alamain; Daphne DiMera
- Nieces and nephews: Brady Black (adoptive); Belle Black (adoptive); Paul Narita (adoptive)
- First cousins: Quinn Hudson; Antony DiMera; Stefan DiMera; Jake Lambert
- Other relatives: Sebastian Alamain

Lawrence Alamain is a fictional character on NBC's daytime drama, Days of Our Lives, and was portrayed by Michael Sabatino from September 11, 1990, to October 18, 1993, and several guest appearances from October 2, 2009, to February 26, 2010, November 4, 2010, and May 13, 2011, to August 3, 2011.

Not much is known about Lawrence's parents Leopold and Philomena, aside from the fact that they were part of an old and powerful European dynasty, part of the nobility of a fictional European country never really named onscreen but alternately referred to in the soap opera media as "Alamania" (which is incidentally very similar to an old Latin word for "Germany") and "Ubilam" ("Malibu", where outdoor scenes were filmed, spelled backwards). The few times the country was shown onscreen, it bore a striking resemblance to southern California.

The Alamains were also very active in business circles, and when Lawrence first appeared on the show, he was the head of a powerful international oil conglomerate. He later demonstrated an uncanny ability to retrieve highly secretive and classified information, such as the cure to biological warfare being used against Allied intelligence agents throughout the world, and the existence of business magnate Victor Kiriakis's "John Black file" which also contained information about the government's (and supervillain Stefano DiMera's) search for some stolen ancient Mayan codices of purportedly high cultural, scientific, and technological value.

Lawrence's mother Philomena was later retconned to be the sister of Stefano's common-law wife, Daphne.

By the time the family was brought onto the show, Philomena had already died, and Leopold (portrayed by longtime character actor Avery Schreiber) was presented as a likeable, fun-loving eccentric, a far cry from his diabolical son Lawrence, before he was killed in an earthquake generated by one of Lawrence's more outlandish plots. It was later revealed that Lawrence was once as kind-hearted as his father, but when his younger adopted brother Forrest was removed from the family canvas via a staged "drowning" event, his family medicated him to the point where he was unable to feel any guilt or remorse about any of his actions.

Lawrence was born to Leopold and Philomena Alamain, and is the adoptive brother of John Black. Lawrence, the scion of the powerful European family, the Alamains, was introduced as the man Katerina von Leuschner (known to Salemites as Carly Manning) was supposed to be wed in an arranged marriage. Carly's best friend, Jennifer Horton, masqueraded as Carly to invalidate the marriage in 1990 – believing Lawrence had no idea who Carly was. Though Lawrence went through with the wedding, it was revealed he knew all along Jennifer wasn't Katerina, as he (masquerading as a man named James) had an affair with Katerina (masquerading as Carly) when they were teenagers, conceiving a child, Nicholas Alamain, who was raised by Lawrence's aunt Vivian Alamain.

Most of Lawrence's time on the show was marked by his triangle with Carly and her boyfriend, the heroic Bo Brady. Though Bo was a far better man than the often dastardly Lawrence, Carly eventually couldn't deny her love for him and the two were married and left town in 1993 with their son, Nicholas. They were not seen again until 2009, when Carly killed Lawrence in self-defense, for threatening the life of Melanie Jonas, a child she'd conceived in an affair with a colleague, Daniel Jonas. Though he died in 2009, Lawrence has appeared numerous times since then as a ghost to both Carly and his aunt Vivian.

== Joey Kiriakis ==
Joey Kiriakis
- Days of Our Lives character
- Portrayed by: Candace Mead (1990); Benjamin Iorio (1990–1991)
- Duration: 1990–1991
- First appearance: September 17, 1990
- Last appearance: January 23, 1991
- Created by: Richard J. Allen and Anne Schoettle
- Introduced by: Ken Corday and Al Rabin
In-universe information
- Other names: Joseph Kiriakis
- Occupation: Businessman
- Family: Kiriakis (adoptive); Johnson (adoptive)
- Parents: J.J. Bagwood; Stanley Krakowski; Justin Kiriakis; Adrienne Johnson Kiriakis (adoptive)
- Brothers: Victor Kiriakis II; Sonny Kiriakis (adoptive)
- Half-brothers: Alexander Kiriakis II (adoptive)
- Grandparents: Alexander Kiriakis (adoptive); Christina Kiriakis (adoptive); Duke Johnson (adoptive); Jo Johnson (adoptive)
- Uncles: Steve Johnson (adoptive); Jack Deveraux (adoptive); Hank Tobin
- Nieces: Kelsey Wesley (adoptive)
- First cousins: Gwen Rizczech (adoptive); Abigail Deveraux (adoptive); Stephanie Johnson (adoptive); JJ Deveraux (adoptive); Joey Johnson (adoptive); Tripp Dalton (adoptive)
- Other relatives: Victor Kiriakis (adoptive)

Joey Kiriakis was introduced in September 1990 and was portrayed by child actors Candace Mead and Benjamin Iorio until the character left the series in 1991. Joey is the biological twin son of Kiriakis family nanny, J.J. Bagwood (Patti Johns) and Stanley Krakowski (Dick Christie), who along with his brother was later adopted by Adrienne Johnson Kiriakis (Judi Evans) and her husband Justin Kiriakis (Wally Kurth).

J.J. was the babysitter to Alexander Kiriakis (Jonathan Thornton), Justin's son with Anjelica Deveraux (Judith Chapman). After Anjelica and Alexander supposedly died in a plane crash, J.J. left town, but returned a few months later, pregnant, and about ready to give birth. She knew she couldn't give the baby a good home, so she asked Justin and Adrienne to give her baby a home. Delighted and unable to conceive, Justin and Adrienne agreed, and were thrilled when they learned the child was really twins. Just when it seem like Justin and Adrienne's family was complete, J.J.'s married lover, Stanley, showed up, and refused to sign papers giving up rights to his children. J.J. would soon second thoughts, but after Justin and Adrienne let her spend a month living with them and the twins, she was able to convince Stanley that their twins would have a wonderful life with the Kiriakises. J.J. and Stanley would later leave town after letting the twins be adopted by Justin and Adrienne. Shortly after, Joey left with the rest of his family to Texas, where their brother Sonny Kiriakis (Freddie Smith) was born.

Although never shown on-screen, Joey returned to Salem in 2007 with his parents and brothers. He attended Salem High School, with his siblings. His time in town was short lived, however, and by January 2008 when the entire family moved again - this time to Dubai.

== Victor Kiriakis II ==
Victor Kiriakis II
- Days of Our Lives character
- Portrayed by: Loren Mead (1990); Jacob Iorio (1990–1991)
- Duration: 1990–1991
- First appearance: September 17, 1990
- Last appearance: January 23, 1991
- Created by: Richard J. Allen and Anne Schoettle
- Introduced by: Ken Corday and Al Rabin
In-universe information
- Occupation: Businessman
- Family: Kiriakis (adoptive); Johnson (adoptive)
- Parents: J.J. Bagwood; Stanley Krakowski; Justin Kiriakis (adoptive); Adrienne Johnson Kiriakis (adoptive)
- Brothers: Joey Kiriakis; Sonny Kiriakis (adoptive)
- Half-brothers: Alexander Kiriakis II (adoptive)
- Grandparents: Alexander Kiriakis (adoptive); Christina Kiriakis (adoptive); Duke Johnson (adoptive); Jo Johnson (adoptive)
- Uncles: Steve Johnson (adoptive); Jack Deveraux (adoptive); Hank Tobin
- Nieces: Kelsey Wesley (adoptive)
- First cousins: Gwen Rizczech (adoptive); Abigail Deveraux (adoptive); Stephanie Johnson (adoptive); JJ Deveraux (adoptive); Joey Johnson (adoptive); Tripp Dalton (adoptive)
- Other relatives: Victor Kiriakis (adoptive)

Victor Kiriakis II was introduced in September 1990 and portrayed by child actors Loren Mead and Jacob Iorio. Victor is the biological twin son of Kiriakis family nanny, J.J. Bagwood (Patti Johns) and Stanley Krakowski (Dick Christie), he with his twin brother were adopted by Adrienne Johnson Kiriakis (Judi Evans) and her husband Justin Kiriakis (Wally Kurth).

Adrienne and Justin had a difficult time getting pregnant, so J.J. who was the babysitter to Alexander Kiriakis (Jonathan Thornton), Justin's son with Anjelica Deveraux (Judith Chapman), decided to let Justin and Adrienne adopt her unborn twins. When J.J.'s lover, Stanley arrived to Salem he refused to sign papers giving up rights of his children to Justin and Adrienne. Ultimately, J.J. also had second thoughts, but after Justin and Adrienne let her spend a month living with them and the boys, she convinced Stanley that they twins would have a wonderful life. Shortly thereafter, Victor left with the rest of his family to Texas, where their brother Jackson (Freddie Smith) was born.

Although never shown on-screen, Victor returned to Salem in 2007 with his parents and brothers. He attended Salem High School, with his siblings. His time in town was short lived, however, and by January 2008 when the entire family moved again - this time to Dubai.

== Lisanne Gardner ==
Lisanne Gardner
- Days of Our Lives character
- Portrayed by: Lynn Herring
- First appearance: April 2, 1992
- Last appearance: October 30, 1992
- Created by: Richard J. Allen & Beth Milstein
- Introduced by: Ken Corday and Al Rabin
In-universe information
- Occupation: Corporate lawyer

Lisanne Gardner was portrayed by Lynn Herring.

Lisanne came to Salem in 1992, where she began working for Lawrence Alamain as Alamain Industries corporate lawyer. She and Lawrence began a relationship, but Lawrence still had feelings for Carly Manning. Lisanne learned that Vivian and Carly were keeping a secret involving a past pregnancy, so told Lawrence, and it eventually emerged that Carly had been pregnant with Lawrence's child, who it was believed had died. However, when Vivian Alamain brought her adopted son, Nicky, to the United States later that year, a different story was to emerge. After some investigation into Nicky's background, Lisanne discovered that he was, in fact Lawrence and Carly's son, who Vivian had actually stolen. Lisanne began to blackmail Vivian with this information, but her plans led to her demise. Nicky returned home one day to find his aunt and Lisanne engaged in a heated argument. He saw Vivian falling to the floor, and believing that Lisanne was hurting his aunt, he tried to separate the two. In the process, Lisanne fell and struck her head on a stone cat. The fall proved fatal for Lisanne, but Vivian told Nicky that she was just unconscious. Vivian and Lawrence's servant, Ivan Marais, then concealed Lisanne's body in the basement, later making it look as though she had been killed in a car crash. Lisanne's death led Lawrence to realise that Nicky was his son, something which caused Vivian to suffer a heart attack. While recovering in hospital, she revealed the truth to Lawrence - she told Carly that Nicky had died, then raised him as her own, even buying her servant's son's birth certificate to cover up the truth. Lawrence subsequently told Carly, who confronted Vivian, threatening to take Nicky away from her. Vivian then tried to leave Salem with Nicky, but was stopped from doing so. Kidnapping charges were brought against Vivian, but later dropped; while she desperately tried to hide the truth from Nicky. However, he ultimately learned his real identity. Meanwhile, suspecting that Lisanne's death may have been the result of foul play, Bo Brady began investigating the Alamains. Vivian told Lawrence to dispose of the stone cat and the rug on which Lisanne had fallen, as both had traces of her blood. Lawrence buried the items in the woods, but was seen by a prostitute, who reported it to the police. Soon after, Bo caught Lawrence trying to dig up the stone cat and arrested him. Lawrence was charged with Lisanne's murder, and went to trial, but it was revealed that Nicky had killed her. The charges against Lawrence were dropped, but Nicky never found out that he'd been responsible for the death.

== Jamie Caldwell ==
Jamie Caldwell, played by Miriam Parrish, first appeared on a recurring status on April 16, 1993, until November 15, 1993, before being upgraded to contract status from November 29, 1993, until August 29, 1996. Jamie is Sami Brady's best friend and the godmother of Will Horton. Jamie worked with Sami at Salem University Hospital as a candy striper and was the first one to find out about her bulimia. She alerted Roman to this fact, while Sami originally believed Marlena told Roman. Jamie also frowned on many of Sami's many schemes to break up Austin and Carrie, including drugging Austin into sleeping with her. Friends later discovered that Jamie has been raped by her father and Jamie moved out of her house and into the Brady Pub. Jamie's character vanished soon after she revealed to Kate that Sami drugged Austin. The actress' contract was not renewed in late 1996 with Jamie simply disappearing without mention. Throughout her time in Salem, Jamie had a crush on Lucas Roberts.

== Peter Blake ==
Peter Blake
- Days of Our Lives character
- Portrayed by: Jason Brooks (1993–1998); Dan Gauthier (2025–2026)
- Duration: 1993–1998, 2025–2026
- First appearance: September 1, 1993
- Last appearance: January 7, 2026
- Created by: James E. Reilly
- Introduced by: Ken Corday and Tom Langan (1993); Ken Corday and Janet Spellman-Drucker (2025)
In-universe information
- Other names: Peter DiMera
- Occupation: Attorney
- Family: DiMera
- Mother: Rachel Blake
- Adoptive father: Stefano DiMera
- Sisters: Kristen DiMera
- Half-brothers: André DiMera (adoptive); Benjy Hawk (adoptive); EJ DiMera (adoptive); Chad DiMera (adoptive); Stefan DiMera (adoptive); Jake Lambert (adoptive); Tony DiMera (legal/adoptive)
- Half-sisters: Renée DuMonde (adoptive); Megan DiMera (adoptive); Lexie Carver (adoptive)
- Wife: Jennifer Horton (1995–1996)
- Grandfathers: Santo DiMera (adoptive)
- Uncles: Ryan Brady (adoptive)
- Nephews: Dimitri Von Leuschner (adoptive); Theo Carver (adoptive); Steven Hawk (adoptive); Johnny DiMera (adoptive); Thomas DiMera (adoptive)
- Nieces: Sydney DiMera (adoptive); Grace Brady (adoptive); Charlotte DiMera (adoptive); Rachel Black

Peter Blake is a fictional character from the American NBC Daytime soap opera Days of Our Lives, portrayed by Jason Brooks. Brooks joined the cast of Days of Our Lives in 1993, airing on September 1, 1993, until November 23, 1993, on a recurring status until upgrading to contract status from December 1, 1993, till December 24, 1996, when the character was presumed dead after being shot by Jack Deveraux. Brooks returned to the role nearly a year later on November 21, 1997, until his departure on February 23, 1998. Dan Gauthier assumed the role when Peter returned on December 19, 2025.

Peter and his sister Kristen were raised but not legally adopted by Stefano DiMera at a very young age following the deaths of their parents; however, their mother Rachel was later revealed to be alive. Peter is known for his relationship with Jennifer Horton whom he married and for contracting the fictitious psychosis-inducing disease "jungle madness". Peter was revealed to have faked his death, after which he was imprisoned for framing Jack and for abducting Jennifer. On July 31, 2019, Abe Carver mentioned that Peter disappeared after his release from prison. He returns to Salem in 2025 when he reveals himself as the captor of those within the DiMera crypt. He is injured during an attempt to kill the captives and ends up on life support. He briefly wakes up, but Dr. Rolf injects his IV with a drug that stops his heart, killing him.

== Alan Harris ==
Alan Harris
- Days of Our Lives character
- Portrayed by: Paul Kersey
- Duration: 1993–95
- First appearance: September 14, 1993
- Last appearance: February 7, 1995
- Created by: James E. Reilly
- Introduced by: Ken Corday and Tom Langan

Alan Harris was played by Paul Kersey from 1993 to 1995.

Alan came to Salem as Lucas' old buddy from West Point who had eyes on both Carrie Brady and her sister Sami, raping the latter while dating her. Carrie attempted to get Alan to confess to what he did to Sami while finding out he tried to rape her too. Sami learned what her sister was attempting to do and she raced to Alan's apartment and he took the two hostage, but Austin Reed and the police managed to save them. A rape trial followed but he was found not guilty. Some time later, he attempted to rape Sami again, this time at gunpoint. She fought back and shot him in the crotch, which mimed him for life. Lucas managed to get Alan drunk and to admit to raping Sami and many other woman. He was sent to prison.

== Father Francis Baker ==
Father Francis Baker was played by Charles Welch from 1994 to 1995 and by Eric Christmas from 1995 to 1996.

Father Francis was the priest who trained John Black in becoming a priest. John went to Father Francis to seek answers about his past and Father Francis showed John a picture of himself as a priest. Father Francis began to fear that Satan had come to Salem and his fears were confirmed when he realized that Marlena Evans Brady had become possessed by Satan himself. He assisted John in performing an exorcism.

Later that year, Tony DiMera (Andre) confessed to Father Francis that he was going to frame John Black for his own murder. Father Francis searched for a way to break the oath of the confessional, but was confronted by Tony. Father Francis had a heart attack and was hospitalized. At the hospital, Tony cut off his oxygen, which caused him to fall into a coma. Whether he still lives is unknown.

== Eliana ==
Eliana, played by Ann Werner, was the long-time housekeeper of Stefano DiMera at the DiMera mansion from January 15, 1996, to April 11, 2003. Ann Werner left the show to pursue a writing career, and the character of Eliana was said to have retired.

== Franco Kelly ==
Franco Kelly, played by Victor Alfieri from June 1996 to October 1998, first came to Salem to model for Titan. It was soon revealed that Kate Roberts hired him to break up Bo and Hope Brady so that her daughter Billie Reed could reunite with her former lover Bo. After Franco was exposed he tried to con Sami Brady into marriage so that he could hide from his mob past and obtain a real green card. Kate planned revenge on Sami by exposing Franco's true motives at their wedding. Before the wedding could take place, Sami discovered Franco had cheated on her and announced that she was going to "kill that bastard". Franco meanwhile, attempted to kill Kate for threatening him but was stopped when Lucas Horton shot Franco, killing him.

Kate wanted to protect Lucas and staged the scene to look like Sami killed Franco. Sami was put on trial and sentenced to death by lethal injection. In early June 1999, Sami nearly died but was saved when Lucas and Franco's old mob boss, Roberto, both confessed to the murder at the last minute. Although Lucas was the real shooter, the police believed a dying Roberto's confession. The truth of Franco's real murderer was never revealed except to Sami and Brandon Walker.

== Father Timothy Jansen ==
Played by three different actors from 1996 to 2008, Father Jansen has been a consistent figure for the church going citizens of Salem at weddings, funerals and death-beds. He has been played by Michael O'Neil (1996), Jim Beaver (1996–97, 2000, 2002–03), and James Lancaster (2003–2005, 2008).

== Bart Beiderbecke ==
Bart Beiderbecke is a longtime DiMera family associate portrayed by Steve Blackwood. Introduced in 1997, he was originally the right-hand man of #Wilhelm Rolf. Following his "death", Bart became Tony's loyal assistant. He appears to be the only member of the DiMera organization who feels any remorse for the pain that is inflicted upon the citizens of Salem as a result of the DiMeras' influence. However, he is smart enough to keep his mouth closed around Tony and Stefano when it comes to this. After Tony's failed attempt at escaping from prison, Bart was seen occasionally for a little longer before leaving the soap. When Bart returned two years later, he was assigned the task of killing Sami Brady, a task which he attempted to complete by drugging her and tying her up inside her car, which was filling with carbon monoxide. He failed, however, when EJ DiMera rescued her. On August 3, 2007, Bart dies when he is stabbed by André DiMera during a sword fight between Andre and Tony DiMera. Stefano mourns Bart's death and is made concerned that Bart may not have made sure that the key to ending the vendetta was kept out of Tony's possession.

== Steven "Jonesy" Jones ==
Jonesy, played by Robert Mandan from September 1, 1997, to November 23, 1998, was Vivian's bizarre husband and caretaker of the DiMera townhouse in Salem. Vivian was first interested in Jonesy because she thought he owned the expensive townhouse and all of its treasures. Vivian accomplished this by hosting a mock séance in which the real Flora Dora told Jonesy to move on with Vivian. Jonesy was not a well man and Vivian and he married in England, with Susan Banks and Edmund Crumb standing up for them. Jonesy died of a heart attack after consummating the marriage. Vivian inherited all of Jonesy's treasures which forced Stefano, the original owner of the townhouse, to marry Vivian in order to reclaim his possessions.

== Craig Wesley ==
Craig Wesley
- Days of Our Lives character
- Portrayed by: Kevin Spirtas
- Duration: 1997–2003; 2005; 2009; 2022
- First appearance: August 4, 1997
- Last appearance: October 5, 2022
- Created by: James E. Reilly
- Introduced by: Ken Corday and Tom Langan
- Spin-off appearances: Last Blast Reunion (2019)
In-universe information
- Occupation: Doctor
- Wife: Nancy Wesley (until 2022)
- Daughters: Chloe Lane; Joy Wesley
- Grandsons: Parker Jonas
- Granddaughters: Kelsey Wesley

Dr. Craig Wesley is a physician at Salem University Hospital and the father of Chloe Lane and Joy Wesley and husband of Nancy Wesley.

Craig attended the same medical school as Mike Horton and later moved to Salem with his wife, Nancy. He competed with Mike for the Chief of Staff position at Salem University Hospital, but despite Craig's numerous schemes, Mike won the position. However, Craig encouraged Ali McIntyre, a nurse with whom Mike had been sleeping and had mentioned better jobs to, to launch a sexual harassment lawsuit against Mike. In the resulting furor, Craig won the job of Chief of Staff.

Later, Craig learned that Nancy had had a baby at 16 years of age and gave it up for adoption. This baby turned out to be Chloe Lane. Despite Craig's reluctance to accept Chloe due to her being proof of Nancy's unfaithfulness, he soon grew to love Chloe as his own. For years, it was believed Chloe was the result of Nancy being raped by her father's business partner, but when Chloe became ill with leukemia, medical tests proved Craig was indeed her real father. He and Nancy conceived a child they hoped would be a perfect match for Chloe for a transplant, Joy. With Chloe in remission, the Wesley family moved to New York, while Chloe headed to Europe to give her singing career another chance. After Chloe's accident when she was awaiting surgery, Craig was devastated that he could not be with his daughter, although he was able to visit a few times. He returned to Salem briefly for Chloe's wedding to Brady Black, and sang for her and Brady.

When Chloe was poisoned and slipped into a coma in August 2009, Craig returned for a brief time to keep a vigil by his daughter's bedside.

Craig returned to Salem after Nancy suspected he was having an affair. Her fears were confirmed when Craig revealed to Chloe that he was, in fact, having an affair, but with a man, thus coming out as gay. Chloe and Brady are shocked that the man in question was none other than Leo Stark. Craig broke up with Leo upon learning he was already married to Jackie Cox and left Salem. He briefly returned to Salem where he was accused of framing Leo for murder. After being cleared, he made peace with Nancy, despite the divorce, deciding that they both deserve the chance to find love rather than stay married. He leaves Salem afterwards.

== Wilhelm Rolf ==
Wilhelm Rolf
- Days of Our Lives character
- Portrayed by: William Utay (1997–2021); Richard Wharton (2022–present)
- Duration: 1997–2003; 2007–2008; 2017–present
- First appearance: September 19, 1997
- Created by: James E. Reilly
- Introduced by: Ken Corday and Tom Langan
In-universe information
- Other names: Charles Putnam
- Occupation: Physician
- Nieces: Marlo Ungerschterner
- Other relatives: J.T. Reiber

Wilhelm Rolf has been portrayed by William Utay from September 19, 1997, to June 12, 2003, and June 4, 2007, to September 24, 2008, and again briefly from October 20 to November 21, 2017. Introduced in September 1997, Dr. Wilhelm Rolf was the DiMera family's jack-of-all-trades and was responsible for: saving Roman's life from jungle fever, brainwashing Hope in order to turn her into Princess Gina, orchestrating the infamous baby switch using his niece Margo's daughter, creating the Gemini Twins (Rex and Cassie Brady), and erasing Patch's and John's memories. He was 'killed' in June 2003 when a crate landed on him and his corpse was subsequently used to fake Larry Welch's death. Utay reprised his role in 2017 from October 20 to October 31.

Rolf returned from the dead, explaining that his death "didn't take." He assumed his old position as a lackey for the DiMeras when he was instructed to kill Sami by poisoning her food at the hospital. After Marlena put Stefano in a coma, Rolf became John's butler. Unbeknownst to John, Rolf began helping Marlena try to repair the disc that contains his memories. Rolf obeyed both John and Marlena in order to avoid jail time for many of his past evil deeds. His character frequently provided comic relief by dressing up in silly costumes or cracking one-liners, often in collaboration with Stefano's other henchman Bart Beiderbecke.

In 2017, Clyde Weston (James Read) reveals that Rolf told him that Sami's late son Will Horton (Chandler Massey) is alive, therefore exonerating Clyde's deranged son Ben (Robert Scott Wilson) of the crime. On Oct. 24, 2017, after claiming to have revived the corpse of Will Horton while posing as a medical examiner in Salem, Rolf ingested a cyanide capsule and committed suicide as Sami Brady and Hope Brady looked on.

On October 31, 2017, Rolf once again returned from the dead in a dream sequence, revived by Ben to bring his victims back to life. The pair later strangle Kayla Brady to death. Rolf dug up the graves of Serena Mason and Paige Larson, the two killing Chad, Abby and Lani respectively. Confronted by a surprised Hope and Rafe, Rolf turns her into Princess Gina via satellite and has Gina murder Rafe via lipstick laced with poison. Hope snaps out of it demanding to know what Rolf made her do. This is ultimately revealed as a nightmare of Abby's

Rolf returns on October 22, 2018, in Kristen's Nashville warehouse. After the warehouse's destruction, Rolf has since continued schemes such as using microchips to turn Hope into "Princess Gina" and Steve Johnson into "Stefano" as well as assisting Gwen Rizczech in drugging Abigail Devereux and framing Gabi Hernandez. Despite being arrested, Rolf still continued to be a threat to the people of Salem. He, Orpheus, and Clyde Weston escape together with their own plots to act on. Rolf confronts Chad DiMera on "Stefano's" microchip where he learns it was destroyed. Grief-stricken, he attempts to kill Chad but is stopped and bound until he blackmails Gwen into setting him free. He then kidnaps Kayla Brady, intending to impregnate her with a clone of Stefano but is stopped before the process is begun and is sent back to prison.

Thanks to Orpheus and Kristen DiMera, he is pardoned along with them and Evan Frears and Gwen. He is revealed to have a comatose Stefan DiMera in the tunnels underneath the mansion. When Jake, Stefan's twin, is shot and killed, Rolf and Kristen decide to transfer his heart into Stefan and revive him. Later, one of his poisons was stolen by Orpheus to kill Marlena, Kate Roberts and Kayla Johnson and he and Kristen grew the orchid that could save their lives just like with Roman Brady years back. He soon is asked by Li to leave Salem and has his lab moved to Jakarta. Before he leaves, Gabi tries to get answers out of him and while he tells her the truth, he injects her with a drug that tampers with her memory.

Later, he reverses Stefan's brainwashing before leaving Salem again. It is revealed that he not only knew of Megan Hathaway being alive, but also helped her with her plan to brainwash Harris Michaels and Bo Brady into doing her bidding. He was also tasked with creating a serum to reverse hers and Bo's age so they could start over their relationship as young individuals. He fled after Megan's compound in Greece was raided. When Megan escaped from police custody after an attempt on Stefan's life, he assists in getting her out of Salem and later does the same for her son Dimitri.

In October 2024, Rolf briefly returns with a serum that could help Sarah walk again after being run over by a car.

== Debra Thomas ==
Debra, played by Paige Rowland, is an ex-girlfriend of Mike Horton's with whom he reunited with in Rome, in 1997. Debra and Mike did not reunite romantically but this did not stop Carrie from getting jealous. Sami became aware of Carrie' feelings towards Debra and Mike and used this turn of events to push Mike and Carrie closer together so she could be with Austin.

== Edmund Crumb ==
Edmund Crumb
- Days of Our Lives character
- Portrayed by: Adam Caine
- Duration: 1998, 2023
- First appearance: January 8, 1998
- Last appearance: October 4, 2023
- Created by: Sally Sussman Morina
- Introduced by: Ken Corday and Tom Langan
In-universe information
- Occupation: Pilot
- Mother: Violet Crumb

Edmund Phineas Crumb, played by Adam Caine from January 8, 1998, to May 8, 1998, and again on September 27, 2023 through October 4, 2023. Edmund is the husband of Susan Banks and the stepfather of EJ DiMera.

Edmund was a soft-hearted and somewhat dimwitted pilot who fell in love with Susan Banks after Susan came to stay at his mother Violet's pub in England. Edmund came to Salem to find Susan, who was a suspect in Kristen's murder, and proposed to her. It wasn't Susan, however, but actually Kristen posing as Susan without anyone else knowing. Edmund and Kristen married while the real Susan was held prisoner in an island harem. Susan escaped and found Edmund and Kristen shortly after Edmund confessed to "Susan" that he accidentally killed Kristen. When Edmund saw both Kristen and Susan he was confused as to whom he had accidentally murdered. It turns out it was Susan's other sister, Penelope Kent. Susan forgave Edmund and they locked Kristen up in the harem and raised baby Elvis together in the United Kingdom.

Edmund resurfaced in September 2023, when Ava Vatali and Harris Michaels came to London looking for Susan after learning that she survived the crash off a cliff with Ava. He has her chained in a bedroom in his flat where the two are also kidnapped. He is quickly stopped by Rafe and Tripp after they follow the two to London and set everyone free. Edmund is later taken to prison. It is revealed later that someone dropped Susan off at his flat and made him promise not to tell anyone that Susan was there. The person worked for Clyde Weston, who was hoping to use Susan as leverage against EJ.

== Greta Von Amberg ==
Greta Von Amberg
- Days of Our Lives character
- Portrayed by: Julianne Morris
- Duration: 1998–2002
- First appearance: May 15, 1998
- Last appearance: November 27, 2002
- Created by: Sally Sussman Morina
- Introduced by: Ken Corday and Tom Langan
In-universe information
- Mother: Gina Von Amberg

Greta Von Amberg is a character from the soap opera Days of Our Lives, portrayed by Julianne Morris from 1998 to 2002.

When Bo Brady went to New Orleans to find out about Hope Brady's past there, he met a scarred young woman who became known as the 'Swamp Girl'. It was soon learned that this Swamp Girl had taken Hope's place on the Cruise of Deception many years ago. Her real identity was revealed later. She was Greta Von Amberg, Princess Gina's daughter. Bo paid for Greta's reconstructive plastic surgery. She also realized that Hope must somehow be experiencing her mother's memories. As a result, she went to France in order to discover the truth. There she also began a romance with Bo's nephew Eric Brady, whom she later broke up with after learning he cheated on her with his ex-girlfriend Nicole Walker. Her mother Gina later turned up alive and stole Hope's place, proving her identity to Greta by producing a rose she safekept for years as Greta gave it to her as a child. Gina imprisoned the real Hope in France and lied about her whereabouts, saying she was dead. Greta only told the truth after her mother died in early January 2000.

Upon the death of her mother, Gina, she inherited her title of "Princess". She next went through several challenges to assume the throne, falling for Austin Reed in the process and nearly being killed in a shooting during her coronation in February 2001. After Austin chooses his ex-girlfriend Sami over her, Greta pursues Jack Deveraux who is using her to make his ex-wife Jennifer jealous. Greta begins to develop real feelings for Jack, and he lies to her that he is gay in order to let her down easy. While he tries to keep up the charade, he ultimately accidentally reveals he is straight and a hurt Greta slaps him for the deception. She ultimately leaves town in April 2002 after revealing she is not really the late Prince Von Amberg's child but she's not John's either. However a shadow of doubt is left as John and Marlena were facing problems with their children and Greta might've lied in order to spare John of any responsibility towards her.

== Lili Faversham ==
Ms. Faversham, played by Millicent Martin from July 17, 1998, to February 14, 2001; was an eccentric older woman from Lugano, Switzerland. Ms. Faversham had lost a great deal of art treasures due to theft and was close friends with Princess Gina Von Amberg. Ms. Faversham recognized Hope as one of her European high society friends, Princess Gina von Amberg and believed that the resemblance meant that Hope was Gina. At one point, Ms. Faversham insisted that Hope accompany her on the Empress Express. Stefano was one of the honored guests of the gathering, and is using the name Rudolfo Meradi. The train derailed with them all aboard but there were no serious injuries. Ms. Faversham learned the truth about the real Princess Gina but befriended Hope and Greta anyway. She moved briefly to Salem where she recognized Vivian Alamain. Lili was the one to finally recognize that the real Princess Gina was posing as Hope in Salem because of a scar that only Gina could have had. She returned to Switzerland and has not been seen since.

In Days of Our Lives: Beyond Salem, it's revealed that she is long-since deceased but has a grandson, Miles. He and his wife Sophie host a swingers' party that Ben Weston and Ciara Brady infiltrate to retrieve a gem that was previously stolen by Princess Gina.

== Brandon Walker ==
Brandon Walker
- Days of Our Lives character
- Portrayed by: Matt Cedeño
- Duration: 1999–2005
- First appearance: June 8, 1999
- Last appearance: February 22, 2005
- Created by: Sally Sussman Morina
- Introduced by: Ken Corday and Tom Langan
In-universe information
- Occupation: Youth counselor
- Father: Abe Carver
- Mother: Fay Walker
- Stepfather: Paul Mendez (until 2001)
- Stepmother: Lexie Carver (2003–2012)
- Half-brothers: Theo Carver
- Half-sisters: Nicole Walker; Taylor Walker; Lani Price (adoptive)
- Spouse: Angela Moroni (pre–1999); Sami Brady (2003–2005)
- Stepsons: Will Horton (2003–2005)
- Grandparents: Benjamin Carver; Rita Carver
- Aunts and uncles: Theo Carver; Karen Carver; Jonah Carver
- Nieces and nephews: Daniel DiMera; Holly Jonas; David Grant (adoptive); Jules Grant (adoptive); Carver Grant (adoptive)

Brandon Walker, played by Matt Cedeño, was introduced as the brother of Nicole Walker (Arianne Zucker) on June 8, 1999. In 2002, it was reported that Cedeño wanted to vacate the role to pursue other opportunities, but he was convinced to sign a contract extension. Cedeño was ultimately released from his contract in 2003 and the character of Brandon was written out on June 3, 2003. Cedeño returned to the series in a six month contract deal from October 18, 2004, to February 22, 2005. In was announced in February 2026 that Cedeno will return to the role in late April tying in the return of Brandon's ex wife and love interest, Sami Brady to Salem.

== Conner Lockhart ==
Conner David Lockhart is the youngest child of David and Bonnie Lockhart. The character was played by Austin Wolff as a child during the summer of 1999 to July 2000, and Noah Segan took over the role on a temporary basis on January 8, 2007. Recasting Segan aged the character to his late teens. Conner left town with Mimi to live in Arizona.

== Jason Welles ==
Jason Welles
- Days of Our Lives character
- Portrayed by: Aaron Van Wagner
- Duration: 1999–2002; 2007; 2019–2020
- First appearance: October 27, 1999
- Last appearance: December 12, 2007(DOOL); January 16, 2020
- Created by: Lorraine Broderick
- Introduced by: Ken Corday and Tom Langan
- Spin-off appearances: Last Blast Reunion (2019)
In-universe information
- Other names: Jason Masters

Jason Welles was played by Aaron Van Wagner from 1999 to 2002, and again in 2007. He is a classmate of Belle, Shawn, Chloe, Jan and others. In November 2019 it was announced that Jason will appear on Days of Our Lives: The Digital Series.

== Jan Spears ==
Jan Spears
- Days of Our Lives character
- Portrayed by: Natalie Ramsey (1999); Heather Lauren Olson (1999–2004); Heather Lindell (2004–2022); Martha Madison (2021)
- Duration: 1999–2005; 2019–2022
- First appearance: November 5, 1999
- Last appearance: August 3, 2022
- Created by: Lorraine Broderick
- Introduced by: Ken Corday and Tom Langan
- Spin-off appearances: Last Blast Reunion (2019)
In-universe information
- Other names: Janet Spears; Belle Black
- Occupation: Socialite/Criminal
- Mother: Gertrude Spears
- Sons: Shawn Christian Spears

Jan Spears has been played by four actresses: Natalie Ramsey (1999), Heather Lauren Olson (1999–2004), Heather Lindell (2004–2005, 2019–) and Martha Madison (December 23 and 24, 2021, when Jan masqueraded as Belle Black, played by Madison). She is introduced as the mean girl at Salem High. Jan was one of the first girls to taunt Chloe Lane and call her "Ghoul Girl" and was responsible for putting pictures of a naked Chloe up on the internet. Jan's boyfriend, Jason Masters, was a real jerk and she finally had enough of him while on an Island. Also while on the Island, Nicole's father, Paul Mendez, rapes Jan, giving her gonorrhea and leaving her pregnant. Jan is humiliated but Shawn felt took pity on her and promised to marry her and raise the baby as their own, devastating Belle. Jan lost the baby and left town. When Jan returned years later, her parents were dead and she was still obsessed with Shawn. Nicole also convinced a deeply disturbed Jan to help her kill Victor Kiriakis which she did (later it was revealed that Victor survived). Jan kidnapped Shawn and held him prisoner in a cage. When Shawn escaped he crashed his motorcycle and lost his memory. He woke up thinking that he wanted to be with Jan and she manipulated him until he regained his memory. Jan's grip on Shawn was loosening so she blackmailed Mimi to help her keep Shawn. Sami Brady, disguised as Stan, witnessed a physical fight between Mimi and Jan where Jan fell and hit her head on a rock. Jan had since remained in a coma and was last mentioned by Nicole while on a dinner date with Phillip Kiriakis in April 2008.

In 2020, Sami reveals to Eric and Nicole that Jan woke up from her coma and was receiving treatment at a mental facility in New York; she recruited Jan to testify against Nicole at the custody hearing for Allie's baby, regarding the attempt that Jan made on Victor's life, per Nicole's request years ago. She soon uses Shawn and Belle's daughter, Claire, to get close to the family. She later kidnaps Belle on her wedding day in order to force Shawn into marrying her instead. John Black attacks her and is put back in a coma, but it did not last long. She awoke and killed Claire's boyfriend, Charlie Dale, in order to frame Belle. However, the scheme begins to unravel and she kidnaps Claire and steals a car with Chloe Lane inside to ensure Belle admits her guilt. After leaving Claire at a cabin she attempts to get Phillip to assist in her escape. However, an altercation with Chloe and Phillip leads her to hit her head and end up in a coma again.

On Christmas Eve, the devil possessed Marlena wakes Jan from her coma and tasks her to cause trouble for Shawn and Belle. She is glamoured to look like Belle and has sex with Shawn. Belle comes home and finds them together. Once the ruse is revealed, Jan is arrested and taken to Statesville Prison.

In April, Jan asks Belle to come to Statesville Prison to receive some news. Jan reveals to Belle that she is pregnant, and that the baby belongs to Shawn. This revelation divides Belle and Shawn, as Shawn neglected to mention that he and Jan had actually slept together when she was disguised as Belle.

A paternity test confirmed that the baby belongs to Shawn. Due to complications with the pregnancy requiring bed rest, Jan convinces Shawn and the warden of Statesville to let her out on house arrest, as long as she stays with Shawn until the baby is born prematurely. She names the boy Shawn Christian. It is later revealed that Evan Frears is the real father and that Orpheus had helped Jan faked the paternity test in exchange for helping him get the password in the police mainframe and find a way out of prison. When Evan learns the truth out the baby, he demands Jan let him see him. She escapes the hospital with the baby and Shawn finds them at the pier, intending to take the two far away from Salem. Belle followed and during a confrontation, Jan is knocked into the water and believed to be dead. She is revealed to be alive and takes her son from Evan after he secured him away from Shawn and Belle. Knocking Evan into the river, Jan happily takes Shawn Christian vowing to get Shawn back once more.

== See also ==
- List of Days of Our Lives characters
- List of Days of Our Lives characters (1960s)
- List of Days of Our Lives characters (1970s)
- List of Days of Our Lives characters (1980s)
- List of Days of Our Lives characters (2000s)
- List of Days of Our Lives characters (2010s)
- List of Days of Our Lives characters (2020s)
- List of Days of Our Lives cast members
- List of previous Days of Our Lives cast members
