= Vivian Alamain =

- Days of Our Lives character
- Louise Sorel as Vivian Alamain
- Portrayed by: Louise Sorel (1992–2018, 2020, 2023–2026); Marj Dusay (1992–1993); Robin Strasser (2019); Linda Dano (2021)
- Duration: 1992–2000; 2009–2011; 2017–2021; 2023–2026
- First appearance: March 2, 1992
- Last appearance: February 4, 2026
- Created by: Richard J. Allen and Beth Milstein
- Introduced by: Ken Corday and Al Rabin (1992); Ken Corday and Gary Tomlin (2009); Ken Corday, Albert Alarr and Greg Meng (2017); Ken Corday and Albert Alarr (2021, 2023); Ken Corday and Janet Spellman-Drucker (2024)
In-universe information
- Other names: Vivian Jones; Vivian DiMera; Vivian Kiriakis
- Occupation: Socialite; Bollywood actress; Businesswoman
- Brothers: Leopold Alamain
- Husband: Victor Kiriakis (1995–1997, 2010–2023); Steven Jones (1998); Stefano DiMera (1998–1999)
- Sons: Quinn Hudson; Stefan DiMera; Jake Lambert
- Nephews: Lawrence Alamain; John Black (adoptive)
- Other relatives: Nicholas Alamain; Brady Black (adoptive); Belle Brady (adoptive); Paul Narita (adoptive); Claire Brady (adoptive); Tate Black (adoptive); Rachel Black (adoptive); Sebastian Alamain

Vivian Alamain is a fictional character from Days of Our Lives, an American soap opera. Created by head writers Richard J. Allen and Beth Milstein, and introduced by executive producers Ken Corday and Al Rabin, the role is most recognized as portrayed by actress Louise Sorel. In addition to Sorel, the role has been portrayed by Marj Dusay, Robin Strasser and Linda Dano.

== Casting ==
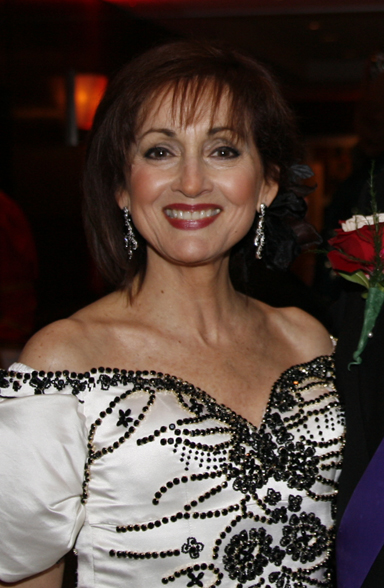
Robin Strasser was cast in 2019 following news that Sorel was unavailable to reprise the role

Louise Sorel, who was previously best known for playing Augusta Lockridge in NBC soap opera, Santa Barbara, was cast in the role of Vivian in 1992. The Days of Our Lives casting director contacted Sorel's new agent about the role of Vivian and described her. Sorel's agent explained that they managed the actress to the casting director, who was familiar with Sorel's work in Santa Barbara. Other actresses were being considered for the role, but Sorel was eventually cast as Vivian. Sorel signed an initial one-year contract with the show. Sorel was released from her contract after only five months. Marj Dusay was cast in the role, appearing for a total of five episodes. When producers learned that they would have to continue paying Sorel, despite her departure, she was brought back to the role. In 1993, it was announced that Vivian's nephew, Lawrence Alamain (Michael Sabatino), and her nemesis, Carly Manning (Crystal Chappell), were to both leave Days of Our Lives. Sorel's future with the show was subsequently in doubt. However, it was confirmed that Sorel would remain on the show regardless. In December 1993, The Herald Journal reported that Sorel had signed a new multi-year contract. In 1995, Sorel signed a third contract term with the show.

In October 1999, it was announced that Sorel was to leave Days of Our Lives when her contract expired in January of the following year. Of Vivian's departure, executive producers, Ken Corday and Tom Langan, said "We love the character of Vivian, and hopefully she will return sometime in the near future." Producers confirmed that the role would not be recast. Vivian and Sorel were dismissed from the soap, and the actress admitted that it felt "horrible". Vivian departed on February 22, 2000.

In July 2009, it was announced that Sorel would be reprising the role of Vivian. Executive producer, Gary Tomlin, contacted Sorel and invited her to return to the show. Sorel was surprised as Tomlin invited her to return over the telephone without seeing her current appearance. Sorel told TV Guide "[Tomlin] didn’t ask me how I’m looking these days. For all he knew, I’ve gained 250 pounds." The actress commuted from New York to California, where Days of Our Lives is filmed, for the role. Sorel signed an initial one-year contract. Sorel was planning to sign a longer contract, but since relocating to New York, she could not speculate on her long-term future with the show. Sorel returned to filming in September 2009. Vivian's return was broadcast on October 30, 2009. Sorel's return coincided with the return of Chappell as Carly. In June 2011, it was revealed by TV Guide that Sorel had been let go following the departure of head writer Dena Higley; she last appeared on September 22 of the same year.

In August 2017, it was announced that Sorel would reprise the role once more. Originally reported to reappear in January 2018, Sorel made her first appearance on December 29, 2017. Sorel departed on May 23, 2018, when the character was presumed dead. In February 2019, it was reported that Robin Strasser had joined the cast in an unknown role; months later it was revealed that she had been cast as Vivian. She appeared from September 2 to October 7 of the same year.

In December 2019, it was announced that Sorel would once again reprise the role. She returned on June 30, 2020, and wrapped up her stint on July 20 of the same year. On December 11, 2020, it was announced Linda Dano had been cast in the role. She first appeared on February 3, 2021, and departed on April 22 of that year.

In March 2023, Sorel revealed she would once again return as Vivian Alamain; these episodes aired in September of the same year. In October 2024, it was announced she would reprise the role again; with Vivian returning during the October 28 episode.

== Storylines ==
=== 1992–2000 ===
Vivian, the aunt of Lawrence Alamain, arrives in Salem on March 2, 1992. She is determined to take over Alamain corporations, but is foiled when John Black inherits them. Vivian looks to be rich, and powerful, so she pursues wealthy crime lord, Victor Kiriakis. Vivian marries Victor for business purposes, but the marriage is short lived. After Victor leaves her for Kate Roberts, Vivian sets out to destroy Carly Manning. Vivian is taking herbal pills from Dr. Wu, which makes her loopy. She begins to target Carly's patients, by injecting them with cleaning fluids. The police begin to investigate Carly for murder. Carly learns Vivian is the one killing off her patients, and sets out to prove it. A crazed Vivian gives Carly a strong dose of morphine to put her in a very deep sleep. Vivian gives Carly a serum that gives her a deathlike paralysis. Carly is pronounced dead, and Vivian buries Carly alive in a coffin, built with a low oxygen supply, and little water. Vivian stops taking her herbs, and realizes what she is doing is crazy, and with the help of Lawrence she digs Carly up. Vivian is arrested and put in Pine Haven Sanitarium where she meets and befriends Laura Horton. Laura sees Vivian as her ticket out of the Sanitarium, and so Laura continues her friendship with Vivian in order to get out of the Sanitarium and get back to Salem.

Vivian is released, and sets her sights on destroying Kate and her marriage to Victor. She finds out that Kate can't produce a male heir, so she carries Kate & Victor's baby. Vivian is now pregnant with their child, and tries to seduce Victor who doesn't fall for her tricks. Vivian gives birth to Philip Kiriakis, and Kate tries everything to get custody. Vivian also tricks Victor into marrying her by replacing Kate during the wedding rehearsal and made it the real deal. When Kate finds out, Vivian drugs Kate's coffee, but the coffee is given to the pilot of a plane Kate is on. The plane crashes, but Kate lives although they can't find her body. She and Victor make love, after they can't find Kate's body. Kate returns, and wants custody of Philip, and gets it. Vivian takes comfort in Rudolfo (who is actually Stefano DiMera) and unwillingly helps with his plan. She and Ivan are accused of helping Stefano kidnap Marlena Evans, but Stefano signs an affidavit exonerating them. She and Ivan are named accomplices in Kristen DiMera 's scheme trapping Marlena in a secret room and are arrested. In exchange for her freedom, Vivian agrees to divorce Victor and gives up her wealth.

Vivian receives bad news when she learns she is fired from Titan. She and Ivan begin taking odd jobs to make ends meet. She meets Steven "Jonesy" Jones, an elderly man whom she thinks is wealthy, but is merely a caretaker for Stefano DiMera. She marries him after a brief romance, and he dies on their wedding night after making love to her. She inherits his belongings, which makes Stefano romance her in order to get his possessions back. He implants a device in her tooth allowing him to control her moods. After they are married, she discovers what he did and files for divorce. He gives her the townhouse and money in exchange for her silence. She begins to look for alternative methods to cure Victor after he suffers a stroke. Once Victor recovers, he returns to Kate. Vivian leaves Salem with her sidekick Ivan to get a fresh start. They travel around the world, and live off Ivan's lottery winnings.

=== 2009–2011 ===
Vivian returned to Salem in 2009, seeking revenge on Carly for killing Lawrence. She arranges for someone else to take the fall for his killing as she wants to deal with Carly personally. She discovers that Carly had an illegitimate child, the result of an affair, and that Lawrence had forced her to give up the child. Vivian resolves to find and kill the now grown child in order to hurt Carly. A vision of Lawrence encourages her in this scheme. Victor, a fellow adversary of Carly, invites Vivian to live in his mansion and offers to help her in her vengeful scheme. With the help of her new manservant and henchman Gus, Vivian learns that Carly's daughter is Melanie Layton, who is engaged to Phillip. Victor forbids her from killing Melanie, and tells Viv to focus on Carly instead. Vivian ignores him and befriends Melanie. She helps with the wedding and poisons a comb that she gives Melanie to wear on her wedding day. Gus holds Carly hostage in a warehouse where she will watch her daughter's death. Carly attacks Gus and steals his phone. She texts Vivian, calling her to the warehouse. Vivian arrives and is attacked by Carly, but Hope has discovered Vivian's plot also. Hope arrives and stops Carly from killing Vivian by revealing that Melanie is fine – Victor had discovered Vivian's scheme and switched the poisoned comb with a safe one. Hope begins to cuff Vivian and arrest her, but Gus awakens behind a stack of crates and topples them onto Hope and Carly. Vivian returns to the wedding at the Kiriakis mansion and lures Melanie to the rooftop terrace to hurl her off. Carly tries to shoot Vivian but Melanie steps in front of Vivian and is shot and falls into a coma.

Victor scolds Vivian for defying him and threatens to turn her over to the police if Melanie dies. Vivian and Carly are both arrested after Hope's statement implicates Vivian. Bo Brady interrogates Vivian to no avail. Victor has hidden all evidence pointing to Vivian's involvement and she is freed. Phillip and Daniel Jonas, Melanie's father, also threaten Vivian. Melanie lives and Victor warns her that he will hand the police the evidence against her if she makes another attempt on Melanie. Vivian, nevertheless, makes another attempt on her life, but Melanie wakes as Vivian is about to suffocate her in her hospital bed. The dazed Melanie tells Vivian to kill her, and reveals her tormented childhood to Vivian. Vivian is moved and relents. She tells the vision of Lawrence that she refuses to kill the young woman and, with Victor's encouragement, she focuses on Carly. Vivian moves out of the mansion temporarily when Phillip tells Victor that he will not return with Melanie while Vivian is there. Vivian tells that Carly that she will leave her and her loved ones alone if Carly will plead guilty to shooting Melanie. Melanie, angry at finding out that Carly is the mother who gave her up, does not help and is hateful towards Carly, to Vivian's delight. Hope brings Melanie around, and as Carly is about to be sentenced, Melanie exonerates her by telling the judge that the shooting was an accident. Vivian is not pleased, and threatens to kill Carly, and continues to torment her despite Bo's warning to leave her alone. Bo goes to Vivian and threatens to kill Vivian, even if it means jail time, in order to protect Carly. Victor, who does not want Bo in jail or Vivian dead, offers to marry Vivian if she will stop her vendetta, and she agrees. She learns, however, that Carly has been threatening to ruin Chloe Lane's relationship with Daniel due to an affair Chloe had with Phillip. Vivian offers her support to Chloe in dealing with Carly. Vivian is married to Victor in a somber ceremony, with both Victor and the guests beiny bitter and cynical about the bizarre proceedings. Vivian gives Chloe the number of one of her past henchmen and tells Chloe to ensure that Carly is in an elevator at the hospital when the henchman instructs. Chloe is uncomfortable with killing Carly, but Vivian convinces her that it is the only way. Chloe attempts to stop the killing several times, finally pushing Carly from the elevator and ending up being dropped herself when the cable malfunctions. Vivian, meanwhile, is on her honeymoon and Victor notices her preoccupation. He threatens to end the marriage and make her life very difficult if anything happens to Carly. Vivian discovers that Chloe was in the elevator and has survived. She vows to punish Chloe for failing to kill Carly.

Vivian tries to get rid of Maggie (Suzanne Rogers), whom she thinks Victor has eyes on, and plans to put her in a sarcophagus and bury her alive. Under the ruse of creating a celebration of Isabella Toscano's life, Vivian commences her plan to kidnap and entomb Maggie in a new sarcophagus, which has supposedly been purchased to contain Isabella's remains. Vivian gets overly confident and sloppy in the final stages of her plan. Isabella's son, Brady Black, discovers the plan and that Vivian has deposited his mother's remains in a pet cemetery. Brady ends up interring Vivian in the sarcophagus rather than Maggie. Vivian is freed by Gus and they entomb Maggie. Victor frees Maggie and plans for Vivian to be arrested but Brady decides she deserves to be free. Vivian and Gus are then dropped on an island but Brady rescues him in June. It is revealed that Vivian had an affair years ago and has a son Quinn, who is a pimp. He initially doesn't get along with Vivian because she abandoned him but he soon agrees to give his mother a second chance much to Gus's dismay. Vivian disowns Quinn when he helps Carly with her drug addiction. They reconcile, but Gus frames Quinn for a series of assaults on prostitutes when in reality he is the culprit. It is revealed that Quinn is innocent when Gus' latest victim (Chloe) comes out of the coma caused by his attack on her, leading to his eventual arrest. Vivian’s friend/former-henchman, Ivan suddenly returns to Salem, shows her the great wealth he has acquired as a Bollywood movie director/producer, expresses his undying love to her, and then takes her with him to India to make her a movie star, and open a new chapter in their lives together as equals.

=== 2017–present ===
On New Year's Eve, 2017, Vivian crashes the DiMera family's New Year's Eve party claiming to have been accompanied by Stefano. In actuality, she is accompanied by her and Stefano's son, Stefan O Dimera (Tyler Christopher). Vivian watches in admiration as Stefan seizes control of DiMera Enterprises and lays claim to the DiMera mansion. Vivian is scheming with Andre DiMera, but their plans end when Andre is killed by Abigail Deveraux (Marci Miller). During a confrontation with Kate, Vivian is shot and presumed dead. Kate tells everyone it was self-defense. In 2019, Vivian (Robin Strasser) is revealed to be alive. She shoots and buries Kate in the cemetery, and later pulls her tubes out when she is in hospital recovering. During an altercation with Lani Price (Sal Stowers), Stefan (Brandon Barash) is shot and presumed dead after trying to save his mother, leading to a devastated Vivian leaving town. In 2020, Vivian (Sorel) returns during Lani's wedding to Eli Grant (Lamon Archey). She is arrested after attempting to shoot Lani with a gun. In police custody, she was convinced that Jake Lambert (Barash) is Stefan brought back from the dead. Ivan shows up and explains that she had twins unknowingly due to her passing out and Jake was taken from her before she awakened. She fakes her death shortly after to avoid prison and disappears again. The following year, Vivian (Linda Dano) is arrested after participating in the kidnapping of Eli and Lani's twins.

In 2023, Vivian (Sorel) is heard during a phone call from prison to Stefan. Later that year, Vivian shows up at Victor’s wake, where she claims that she is still legally married to Victor, which later turns out not to be true. She briefly takes over Titan Industries but eventually leaves to Alamania after she shoots Dimitri Von Leuschner but returns to town in 2024, reunited with Ivan, to kidnap Stefan. Vivian forges Stefan's signature on his divorce papers and writes a fake letter, allegedly written by Victor, that declares Philip as the legal heir of Titan Industries. She then gets arrested after Kate informs the police on her. In April of the following year, a now-free again Vivian shows up, surprising Philip and Kate. She demands Xander's half of Titan as payment for her part in the scheme. When she feels brushed off, Vivian tells Xander the truth about the forgery before leaving Salem yet again.

== Reception ==
In 2020, Charlie Mason from Soaps She Knows placed Vivian 12th on his list of the 35 most memorable characters from Days of Our Lives, commenting that "The descriptor “legendary” was invented for the likes of Louise Sorel's character, a malevolent minx who buried alive one foe (Carly Manning) and stole the embryo right out from under another (No. 18 [Kate Roberts]). Mad. Awful. Brilliant." Mason also placed the 2019 recasting of Vivian on his list of the worst soap opera recasts of all time, saying "You just don't mess with a classic — and Louise Sorel, folks, is a classic. So, despite the fact that the show picked a wonderful actress to replace her in 2019 — One Life to Live Emmy winner Robin Strasser (Dorian) — the recast didn't take, and Sorel was brought back when Vivian returned in 2020." In 2020, Belinda Jepsen from Mamamia put Carly being buried alive by Vivian on her list of the five "most ridiculous storylines" that occurred on Days of Our Lives, calling the storyline "dark". Mason and Richard Simms from Soaps She Knows called Vivian the "Best Quipster" character of American soap operas in 2023, explaining that she "grates on the nerves of every single character upon whom she drops one of her witty bon mots, which makes her one of our all-time favorite Days of Our Lives characters. Where Vivian goes, a good time is sure to follow… if not for the residents of Salem, certain for us."
