= Gene Palumbo =

American screenwriter

Gene Palumbo (November 10, 1945 – October 10, 2000) was an American television producer and writer.

== Career ==
Palumbo served as the head writer of the CBS Daytime soap opera Guiding Light with L. Virginia Browne from 1982 to 1983, where he won a 1982 Daytime Emmy Award for Outstanding Drama Series Writing.

He later co-created Rituals, which ran from 1984 to 1985.

Palumbo was the head writer of the ABC Daytime serial General Hospital from 1989 to 1991, replacing Ann Marcus after the 1988 Writers Guild of America strike. He was himself replaced in 1991 with Norma Monty, the sister of Executive Producer and former head writer Gloria Monty, who had returned to the series in 1990. Palumbo then served as head writer for NBC Daytime's Days of Our Lives from June 19, 1991, to August 6, 1992. He was hired by Ken Corday in March 1991.

== Awards and nominations ==
Daytime Emmy Awards

WINS

- (1982; Best Writing; Guiding Light)

Writers Guild of America Award

NOMINATIONS

- (1992 seasons; Days of Our Lives)

== HW history ==
Preceded by Pat Falken Smith	Head writer of Guiding Light (with L. Virginia Browne); November 29, 1982 - March 1983	Succeeded by Carolyn Culliton, Richard Culliton and Gary Tomlin
Preceded by Pat Falken Smith	Head writer of General Hospital (with Norma Monty and John Whelpley: 1991); May 8, 1989 - April 1991	Succeeded by Norma Monty
Preceded by Richard J. Allen; Anne Schoettle	Head writer of Days of Our Lives; June 19, 1991 - January 30, 1992	Succeeded by Richard J. Allen; Beth Milstein
Preceded by Sheri Anderson	Head writer of Days of Our Lives (with Sheri Anderson); July 10, 1992 - August 6, 1992	Succeeded by Sheri Anderson
