= Melanie Jonas =

- Days of Our Lives character
- Portrayed by: Molly Burnett
- Duration: 2008–2012; 2014–2016
- First appearance: July 31, 2008
- Last appearance: January 28, 2016
- Created by: Dena Higley and Rick Draughon
- Introduced by: Ken Corday and Edward J. Scott (2008); Ken Corday, Lisa de Cazotte and Greg Meng (2014); Ken Corday, Albert Alarr and Greg Meng (2016)
In-universe information
- Other names: Melanie Layton; Melanie Kiriakis
- Occupation: Nurse; Clinician; Hospital volunteer; Business consultant; Executive assistant
- Parents: Daniel Jonas; Carly Manning
- Adoptive parents: Trent Robbins; Jane Layton
- Half-brothers: Max Brady (adoptive); Nicholas Alamain; Parker Jonas
- Half-sisters: Holly Jonas
- Husband: Philip Kiriakis (2010–11)
- Grandfathers: Henri Von Leuschner; George Jonas; (legal)
- Grandmothers: Maggie Horton; Lillian Parker (adoptive)
- Uncles: Frankie Brady
- Aunts: Melissa Horton (adoptive); Janice Barnes (adoptive); Sarah Horton; Summer Townsend
- Nephews: Isaac Brady (adoptive)
- First cousins: Nathan Horton; Mackenzie Horton; Victoria Kiriakis

Melanie Jonas is a fictional character from Days of Our Lives, an American soap opera on the NBC network. Created by former head writers Rick Draughon and Dena Higley, the role is portrayed by Molly Burnett. She arrived as the daughter of Trent Robbins and the sister of Max Brady; however, it was later revealed she is the daughter of Carly Manning and Daniel Jonas.

For her work on Days of Our Lives, Burnett was nominated for a Daytime Emmy Award for Outstanding Younger Actress in a Drama Series in both 2010 and 2012.

== Casting ==
"Going in, I knew it was a four-year contract and look, it's been the most amazing experience [...] Everyone is so loving and so wonderful and so supportive. It's going to be so hard.... I mean, this is my family. I came out here and I knew nothing, I knew no one and DAYS just kind of opened its arms and took me in. I look at it as four years of the best training any actor could have ever been given [...] I just want to go explore; see what's up with this whole world"

— Burnett, on her 2012 exit

Melanie was created by head-writer Dena Higley and Rick Draughon. She is portrayed by actress Molly Burnett. Burnett first aired on July 31, 2008. Apart from Days of Our Lives, Burnett had previously appeared for one episode each on the NBC television series Life and Grey's Anatomy. On May 29, 2012, it was announced that Burnett was to depart Days of our Lives following her decision to quit the series due to her contract which expired that June. Burnett's exit aired on September 28, 2012.

Rumors of Burnett's return circulated in late 2014; the return was conformed by TV Guide Magazine. Burnett's return aired on November 21, 2014. In April 2015, rumors circulated that Burnett had wrapped up filming in and would exit the series, following her six-month stint. Burnett's exit was confirmed by the Soap Opera Network. Burnett's last air date was on June 2, 2015.

In December 2015, it was revealed that Burnett was returning to the show to facilitate the exit of Shawn Christian, she returned from January 13 to 28, 2016.

== Development ==
=== Introduction and characterization ===
On July 31, 2008, Melanie was introduced as a sharp-tongued, quick-witted party girl who is well known for seducing men. Upon her debut, she is revealed as the daughter of Jane Layton and Trent Robbins, who is also the father of her half brother Max Brady. After finding a picture of a young girl that belongs to Trent, it is revealed that Melanie is Max Brady's sister. Max travels to Paris, France (where Melanie lives) and pays Melanie's debt to a man named Les. Quickly upon her introduction, Melanie reveals she has criminal tendencies, including using a wealthy French man to drain his bank account, stealing a teacher's wallet during grade school, and stealing a diamond bracelet from her friend Tiffany. She quickly makes enemies with Max's girlfriend Stephanie Johnson, who doesn't find Melanie's party girl attitude endearing.

After being released on bail and leaving Max behind, Melanie meets Nick Fallon, Max's friend and business partner, where the two instantly hit it off. Melanie convinces Tiffany to drop the charges against Max and Stephanie, with Max taking her on a date. Melanie soon moves to Salem after her brother returns to the United States. After moving to Salem, Trent uses Melanie to have a drink with a man who wants more out of her. Nick rushes to her aid, where he is shot and hospitalized. Trent is murdered and Nick is revealed as the killer.

=== Biological family reveal ===
After turning in Nick Fallon for the murder of her father, Nick signs over his share of the alternative fuel project to Melanie, allowing her to get a job at Titan and meet Philip Kiriakis (Jay Kenneth Johnson), whom she develops a crush on. However, because he was her boss, she casually begins dating Nathan Horton. Melanie, unaware of Nathan's deep feelings for her, engages Phillip, who is dating Stephanie Johnson, causing a rivalry with Stephanie. When Melanie sells the project Nick developed to Tony DiMera, Stephanie is kidnapped causing Melanie to help Phillip save Stephanie. However, the two break up despite Melanie's attempts to keep them together. Stephanie flirts with Nathan during their date, causing Melanie to leave. She finds Philip and the two sleep together and soon after begin a relationship. Eventually Philip proposes to Melanie.

It was revealed on-screen that Melanie is in fact the long-lost daughter of Dr. Daniel Jonas and Carly Manning and that she was conceived in an affair, causing Carly's husband Lawrence Alamain to give her up for adoption. The reveal surfaced when Vivian Alamain returns to Salem to wreak revenge on Carly for murdering Lawrence; learning that Carly has a biological daughter. Vivian plots to kill Melanie in order to hurt Carly as revenge for Lawrence's death. After failed attempts by Vivian, Melanie is accidentally shot by Carly when she attempts to stop Vivian from hurting Melanie. Melanie eventually wakes up from her coma when Vivian attempts to suffocate her with a pillow. Upon learning about her biological parents, Melanie is initially furious with Carly and bonds with Daniel.

=== Relationships ===
In 2011, Melanie was involved in a storyline in which she would fall in love with her best friend Abigail Deveraux's (Kate Mansi) boyfriend Chad DiMera (Casey Jon Deidrick). Speaking of this during an interview with Michael Fairman, Burnett talked about her admiration of the normality of the storyline, stating: "How many girls have fallen in love with their best friend's significant other? It totally happens".

In an interview with Daytime Confidential, Burnett talked about Melanie and Brady Black's friendship, which Jamey Giddens said could have been a romance, stating: "I love what Melanie and Brady had. I think they were a really authentic team. There was such a genuine admiration and friendship there. It would have been a kind of story that maybe way down the line, any romantic relationship that could have blossomed would have been a real one."

== Storylines ==
Melanie was first found by her half-brother Max Brady, and she was baffled when she found out that she had a brother living in Salem. Melanie followed Max back to Salem, and eventually moved to town. Trent, who is generally hated by all in town, was murdered; Melanie was the main suspect. She confesses to having a serious fight with him the night of the murder but also says she maintained her cool and wouldn't have even attempted to kill him. It was later revealed that Nick Fallon, a friend of hers (he was in love with Melanie, but she wasn't interested in him) had killed Trent, due to problems with an alternative fuel project at the university. Melanie inherited her father's goods.

Initially Melanie had encouraged Nick to continue his work with the fuel project so they could sell it in order to attain money and not turn himself in for the murder; however, when Nick became too obsessed with Melanie and even proposed to her at one stage, she turned him in herself to avoid him. Nick was sent to jail. He signed over his share of the fuel project to Melanie, allowing her to get a job at Titan, and she developed a crush on Philip Kiriakis, her boss at the time; however, she casually was dating [[Nathan Horton List of Days of Our Lives characters introduced in the 2000s#Nathan Horton]]. She had a rivalry with Stephanie Johnson, Phillip's then girlfriend (who had previously dated Max, and Melanie hated her then too). Nathan and Melanie both worked at the Salem Hospital together, and he developed deep feelings for her. Melanie chose to engage Phillip, unaware of Nathan's true feelings.

Melanie is both elated and confused to learn that Daniel Jonas (a doctor at the hospital) is her father, and later, it is revealed that Carly Manning is her mother (she was conceived during an affair they had many years ago) and that Trent isn't even blood-related to her. Melanie developed a deep friendship with Maggie Horton, whom she viewed as a mother. She became instantly well acquainted to her new parents. Nathan and Melanie kissed and fell in love during her engagement, however they were never physical. They planned to run away before her marriage to Phillip, but she stayed true to her commitments. On the day of her wedding, her mother's stalker (who was seeking revenge on Carly for killing her husband, who was Vivian's nephew, in self-defense) Vivian Alamain (Louise Sorel) (who had befriended and manipulated Melanie to kill her to get revenge on Carly) poisoned her comb. She was fine, and Vivian's plans to allow Carly to watch her daughter die failed. However, Carly shoots Vivian, but Melanie jumps in the way (protecting Vivian, whom she assumed was on her side). Melanie slipped into a brief coma. Vivian tries to kill Melanie in the hospital, and Melanie tells Vivian her life story, which touches Vivian who relents. Melanie and Phillip are married and Vivian shifts her attention from Melanie to Carly.

When Phillip sees Melanie and Nathan together (they were not physical, just passionately holding each other), he goes to his former flame and Daniel's fiancée, Chloe Lane, and they have sex. It was later revealed that Chloe was pregnant. She goes through her pregnancy with the knowledge that the baby has two possible fathers. After the child is born, Phillip is revealed as the father. Melanie left him and ended their marriage, despite briefly tricking him into thinking she loved him to take away his and Chloe's baby, Parker, with encouragement from his own mother, Kate DiMera who despised Chloe. She is pregnant with Phillip's child, but loses the baby during an altercation with Stephanie. She briefly dates Nathan, however he leaves, thinking they can never be together due to the hassle already caused. Melanie dates Dario, Rafe Hernandez's brother, who leaves town, devastating Melanie. Melanie kisses her best friend Abigail Deveraux's boyfriend, Chad DiMera. The two have a fling which upsets Abigail. Later after Abigail has moved on, Gabi Hernandez develops feelings for Chad as well. In order to get Chad all to herself Gabi hires a man to kidnap Melanie, who takes her down into the DiMera tunnels causing an explosion that almost killed Jack Deveraux, because of the experience Melanie leaves town in 2012, to join her mother Carly in Europe.

In 2014, Melanie returns to Salem after getting into some trouble in Europe. She develops a relationship with Brady Black and the two get engaged, but when Theresa Donovan threatens Melanie to not allow Brady to see his son Tate unless she leaves town, she breaks off the engagement and exits the show once again in 2015. She comes back for a quick visit in January 2016, for Daniel's funeral.

== Reception ==
Initially the character was negatively received by fans; Burnett cited that in her first public appearance she was heavily booed by the audience. However, when she departed four years later, it was negatively received by fans. For her work on Days of our Lives as Melanie, Burnett was nominated for a Daytime Emmy Award for Outstanding Younger Actress in a Drama Series in both 2010 and 2012.
