= William Utay =

American film, stage and television actor

- Born: William Madans Utay; September 7, 1947 (age 78); Dallas, Texas, U.S.
- Education: Southern Methodist University
- Occupations: Film and television actor
- Spouse: Susan Utay

William Madans Utay (born September 7, 1947) is an American film, stage and television actor. He is perhaps best known for playing "Dr. Wilhelm Rolf" in the American soap opera television series Days of Our Lives.

== Life and career ==
Utay was born in Dallas, Texas. He performed on stage productions, in which he studied about theatre while attending at Southern Methodist University. After attending, Utay moved to Boston, Massachusetts, where he performed at the Charles Playhouse, from which he then moved to California, in 1979. Utay began his film and television career in 1982, first appearing in the sitcom television series Filthy Rich, where he played the role of a butler. In 1984, he played the recurring role of the homeless man Phil Sanders in the NBC sitcom television series Night Court, in which his character was later killed in an accident, being crushed by a piano. After his character was killed, Utay played Will Sanders, the crooked evil twin of his character Phil Sanders.

Utay guest-starred in television programs including Dave's World, Married... with Children, Who's the Boss?, The John Larroquette Show, Hunter, Mickey Spillane's Mike Hammer, ER, Highway to Heaven, L.A. Law, Star Trek: Enterprise, Seinfeld, Murder, She Wrote, Designing Women, What's Happening Now!! and The Drew Carey Show. He also co-starred and appeared in films such as The Runestone, Two Idiots in Hollywood, Play It to the Bone, Dark Blue, Ali, 'Til There Was You, Tin Cup, Bodily Harm and Harlem Nights.

Utay then appeared in the soap opera television series Days of Our Lives, first appearing in 1995, where he played Larry. In 1997, he played the role of the mad scientist "Dr. Wilhelm Rolf". Utay then retired from playing the character on June 10, 2003, later returning to play the role from June 4, 2007, to September 25, 2008. In 2017, he returned in Days of Our Lives for the third time, where he returned in the episode that aired on October 23, 2017. Utay was interested in appearing on episodes of Days of Our Lives, after being asked from the people who worked on the soap opera.
