= Anne Schoettle =

American writer

Anne Schoettle (born October 5, 1959) is an American television soap opera writer. She previously used Anne M. Schoettle as her screen name.

Her husband is David Shaughnessy. They have three daughters Amy, Katie and Josie.

== Positions held ==
The Bold and the Beautiful

- Script Writer: September 27, 2002 – December 16, 2003 (hired by Bradley Bell)

Days of Our Lives

- Production Associate/Associate Director: 1980 – April 1984
- Script Writer: January 1984 – June 1986, September 21 – December 8, 2006
- Breakdown Writer: January 1986 – January 1990
- Head Writer: January 22, 1990 – June 18, 1991

General Hospital

- Script Editor: September 5, 2024 – December 27, 2024

Guiding Light

- Script Writer: June 2005 – July 2005

Port Charles

- Associate Head Writer/Script Editor: July 26, 1999 – 2002

Sunset Beach

- Script Writer/Script Editor: April 17, 1997 – July 31, 1998

The Young and the Restless

- Consultant: 1992 - 1993 (hired by William J. Bell)
- Script Writer: December 23, 2009 – December 29, 2015; April 27, 2018 – January 15, 2020 (hired by Maria Arena Bell)
- Breakdown Writer: January 15 – 27, 2016

== Awards and nominations ==
Daytime Emmy Awards

- Win, 2010 season, The Young and the Restless
- Win, 2013 season, The Young and the Restless
- Win, 2019 season, “The Young and the Restless”
- Nomination, 1987 season, Days of our Lives
- Nomination, 1985 season, Days of our Lives

Writers Guild of America Award

- Nomination, 1997 season, Sunset Beach
- Nomination, 1991 season, Days of our Lives
- Nomination, 1987 season, Days of our Lives
- Win, 2013 season, 'The Young and the Restless'
- Win, 2020 season, “The Young and the Restless”

Preceded by Anne Howard Bailey	Head Writer of Days of Our Lives (with Richard J. Allen); January 22, 1990 - June 18, 1991	Succeeded by Gene Palumbo
