= Richard J. Allen (writer) =

American television soap opera writer (born 1959)

Richard J. Allen (born November 13, 1959, New York, New York) is an American television soap opera writer and playwright. His plays include The Man Who Killed Rock Monnenoff, Seducing Sally, and Starbright & Vine.

Allen, who is Jewish, is professor and former chair of the department of Film, Television and Digital Media at Texas Christian University in Fort Worth.

== Positions held ==
Another World

- Script Writer: 1997 - 1999

As the World Turns

- Script Writer: 1999 - 2001

Days of Our Lives

- Co-Head Writer: 1990 - 1991, 1992
- Breakdown Writer: 1986 - 1989
- Occasional Script Writer: March 2003 - June 2003

General Hospital

- Script Writer: 1992 - 1993

One Life to Live (hired by Michael Malone)

- Script Writer: 1993 - 1995

== Awards and nominations ==
Daytime Emmy Award

- Win, 2002, Best Writing, As the World Turns
- Win, 2001, Best Writing, As the World Turns
- Nomination, 1987, Best Writing, Days of our Lives

Writers Guild of America Award

- Nomination, 1997, Best Writing, Another World
- Nomination, 1991, Best Writing, Days of our Lives
- Nomination, 1987, Best Writing, Days of our Lives

Preceded by Anne Howard Bailey	Head Writer of Days of Our Lives (with Anne Schoettle); January 22, 1990 - June 18, 1991	Succeeded by Gene Palumbo
Preceded by Gene Palumbo	Head Writer of Days of Our Lives (with Beth Milstein); January 31, 1992 - June 12, 1992	Succeeded by Sheri Anderson
