= Gut Check (House) =

- House episode
- Episode no.: Season 8 Episode 16
- Directed by: Miguel Sapochnik
- Written by: Jamie Conway; David Hoselton
- Original air date: April 9, 2012

Guest appearances
- Greg Finley as Bobby Hatcher; Will Shadley as Duncan "Wilson"; Saachiko as Popo Park

Episode chronology
← Previous "Blowing the Whistle"	Next → "We Need the Eggs"
- House season 8

"Gut Check" is the sixteenth episode of the eighth season of House and the 171st overall. It aired on April 9, 2012 on FOX.

== Plot ==
House and the team take on the case of a 22-year-old minor league hockey player, Bobby "The Hatchet" Hatcher who collapsed while coughing up blood after a fight on the ice. Complications ensue, such as male breast development, and after several false diagnoses the patient is saved.

Wilson finds out that he may have fathered a son 11 years ago in a broken relationship, but House neglected to tell Wilson at the time. Wilson contacts the ex-girlfriend and makes arrangements to meet his son. They get along well, and Wilson takes him to his apartment where the son fixes a fancy pizza with prosciutto and goat cheese. Wilson has a crisis when the son tells him that his mother wants to move to Costa Rica and that he would like to move in with Wilson instead. Wilson confesses that he doesn't feel ready to have his son live with him but House makes the problem go away by revealing that the "son" was a child actor hired by him.

Meanwhile, Chase offers to let Park crash at his apartment while she is having trouble with her grandmother.

== Reception ==
The Onion's AV Club gave this episode a B+ rating, while Lisa Palmer of TV Fanatic gave it a 3.5/5.0 rating.
