= Beth Milstein =

American screenwriter and producer

Beth Milstein is an American television writer and producer.

== Positions held ==
The Young and the Restless (hired by Josh Griffith)

- Script Writer: May 14, 2008 – July 10, 2008; November 19, 2012 – September 24, 2015
- Script Editor: July 11, 2008 – November 2, 2012; November 10, 2017 – November 5, 2018

Days of Our Lives

- Breakdown writer/Script editor: April – June 1985, December 1986, July 1990 –March 1991, August 10, 2006 – October 26, 2007
- Interim Head Writer: August 10, 2006 - October 4, 2006
- Co-Head Writer: January 31, 1992 - June 12, 1992, February 22, 2016 – September 2, 2016
- Assistant Producer: April 1, 1981 – March 1983
- Associate Head Writer: 1987 - 1992, October 5, 2006 - October 26, 2007
- Associate Producer: March 1983 - August 1988
- Script Writer: October – November 1980

The Bold and the Beautiful (hired by Bradley Bell)

- Script Writer: August 23, 2002 - May 23, 2005

Port Charles

- Associate Head Writer: 2000

Sunset Beach

- Script Writer: 1997 - 1998

== Awards and nominations ==
2 Writers Guild of America Awards

2010 season, The Young and the Restless

2013 Season, The Young and the Restless

- Nomination, 1997 season, Sunset Beach
- Nomination, 1991 season, Days of our Lives

3 Emmy Awards

== HW History ==
Preceded by Gene Palumbo	Head Writer of Days of Our Lives (with Richard J. Allen); January 31–June 12, 1992	Succeeded by Sheri Anderson
Preceded by James E. Reilly	Head Writer of Days of Our Lives; August 10–October 4, 2006	Succeeded by Hogan Sheffer; Meg Kelly
Preceded by Dena Higley; Josh Griffith	Head Writer of Days of Our Lives (with Dena Higley and Josh Griffith); February 22, 2016 – September 2, 2016	Succeeded by Dena Higley; Ryan Quan
