= Sheri Anderson =

American writer, television producer

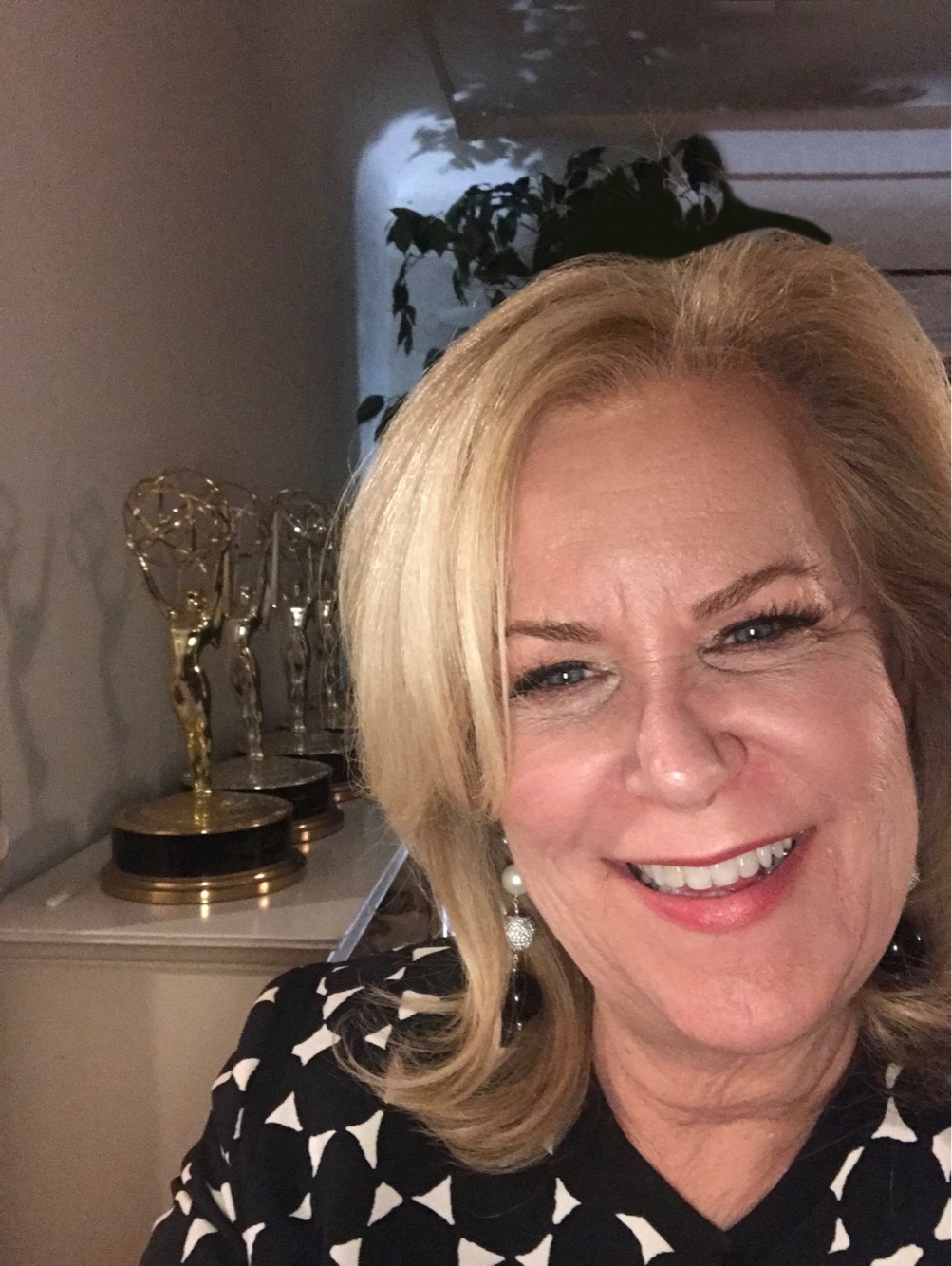

Sheri Anderson is an American television producer. She has been involved in every aspect of the writing process including long-term storyline, daily episode breakdowns, dialogue writing and editing, audition scenes and supervision of the writing staff, as well as having final say in casting. She is recognized as one of the creative forces behind the high romance era of soap opera in the 1980s.

== Career ==
Shows that Anderson helmed or co-head wrote include Days of Our Lives, General Hospital, Santa Barbara, Guiding Light, Another World and primetime's Falcon Crest. During that time, she developed two spinoffs for Days of our Lives. She also served as Executive Producer for the first original content program on the web, The Spot, and also developed numerous TV and film projects domestically for Spelling Entertainment, NBC, Sony Interactive and Nelvana, and internationally with Bavaria Films (Germany), Spectak (Australia) and Franz Marx Films/MNET (South Africa).

Through an actress she cast on Days of our Lives, Anderson met talent manager Paul Cohen, and they soon joined forces. Their company, The Partnership, is based in Hollywood and represents actors in film and television.

Anderson, formerly a member of Writers Guild of America West, left and maintained financial core status amidst the 2023 Writers Guild of America strike.

== Personal life ==
Sheri resides in Los Angeles with her husband.
