= Days of Our Lives =

American daytime television soap opera (since 1965)

- Also known as: Days; DOOL
- Genre: Soap opera
- Created by: Ted Corday; Betty Corday
- Written by: Various (currently Paula Cwikly and Jeanne Marie Ford)
- Directed by: Herb Stein; Phil Sogard; Grant Johnson; Steven Williford
- Starring: Present cast; Past cast
- Theme music composer: Charles Albertine; Tommy Boyce; Bobby Hart
- Country of origin: United States
- Original language: English
- No. of episodes: 15,000

Production
- Executive producers: Various (currently Ken Corday and Noel Maxam)
- Producer: Various
- Production location: The Burbank Studios (Burbank, California)
- Running time: 30 minutes (1965–1975); 60 minutes (1975–present)
- Production companies: Corday Productions; Sony Pictures Television (Note: Credited as Screen Gems (1965–1974), Columbia Pictures Television (1974–2001) and Columbia TriStar Domestic Television (2001–2002).)

Original release
- Network: NBC
- Release: November 8, 1965 – September 9, 2022
- Network: Peacock
- Release: September 12, 2022 – present

Related
- Days of Our Lives: Beyond Salem; Days of Our Lives: A Very Salem Christmas

Days of Our Lives (also stylized as Days of our Lives; simply referred to as Days or DOOL) is an American television soap opera that aired on the network NBC from November 8, 1965, to September 9, 2022; the soap has streamed new episodes on Peacock since September 12, 2022. The soap is one of the longest-running scripted television programs in the world, airing nearly every weekday since November 8, 1965. A co-production of Corday Productions and Sony Pictures Television, the series was created by husband-and-wife team Ted Corday and Betty Corday. During Days of Our Lives' early years, Irna Phillips (creator of former NBC stablemate Another World as well as its former CBS rivals, As the World Turns and Guiding Light) served as a story editor for the program and many of the show's earliest story lines were written by William J. Bell, who would depart the series in 1975 to focus full-time on The Young and the Restless, which he created for CBS in 1973. Following the 2007 cancellation of Passions, Days of Our Lives remained the only soap opera airing on NBC. On August 3, 2022, NBCUniversal announced that it would relocate the series exclusively to its Peacock streaming service beginning September 12, after 57 years on the network, leaving NBC as the only Big Three network without a daytime serial.

The series is set in Illinois, in the fictional city of Salem, and primarily focuses on two groups – the Brady and the Horton families. Other families, however, are also frequently represented including the DiMera and Kiriakis families. The actress Frances Reid (who played the matriarch of the Horton family, Alice Horton), remained with the show from its inception until her death in 2010; her last, formal appearance had occurred in December 2007. Suzanne Rogers is the longest-serving member of the program's current cast, and the longest-serving current cast member of an ongoing American soap opera, having appeared on the show since August 1973 (Rogers celebrated 50 years on Days of Our Lives in 2023). Susan Seaforth Hayes – the second longest-serving actor currently on the program – is the only cast member to appear on Days of Our Lives in all seven decades it has been on the air, having made her first appearance in December 1968 as a recast of original character Julie Olson.

Due to the series' success, daily episodes were expanded from 30 minutes to 60 minutes on April 21, 1975. Days of Our Lives has been syndicated in many countries, internationally, in the years since its debut. The soap was given the title of "most daring drama" in the seventies, due to the episodes venturing into topics that other soaps of the era would not dare to cover. The show's executive producer is Ken Corday, who has held that role since his mother, Betty, relinquished showrunning duties upon her semi-retirement from the program in 1986, with Janet Spellman-Drucker serving as co-executive producer. As of July 2025, Days of Our Lives has been renewed through 2028. The soap celebrated its 15,000th episode on December 2, 2024.

The show has been parodied by the sketch comedy series SCTV (as "The Days of the Week") and the sitcom Friends, with some cast members making crossover appearances on the show, including Kristian Alfonso, Roark Critchlow, Matthew Ashford, Kyle Lowder and Alison Sweeney. The show has had high-profile fans such as actress Julia Roberts and Supreme Court Justice Thurgood Marshall.

== History ==
The Horton family in 1973. Back row (left to right): Edward Mallory (Bill), John Clarke (Mickey), Marie Cheatham (Marie), John Lupton (Tommy). Front row (left to right): Frances Reid (Alice), Macdonald Carey (Tom), Patricia Barry (Addie).

The Cordays and Bell combined the "hospital soap" idea with the tradition of centering a series on a family, by making the show about a family of doctors, including one who worked in a mental hospital. Storylines in the show follow the lives of middle- and upper-class professionals in Salem, a middle-America town, with the usual threads of love, marriage, divorce, and family life, plus the medical storylines and character studies of individuals with psychological problems. Former executive producer Al Rabin took pride in the characters' passion, saying that the characters were not shy about "sharing what's in their gut."

Critics originally praised the show for its non-reliance on nostalgia (in contrast to shows such as As the World Turns) and its portrayal of "real American contemporary families." By the 1970s, critics deemed Days of Our Lives to be the most daring daytime drama, leading the way in using themes other shows of the period would not dare touch, such as artificial insemination and interracial romance. The January 12, 1976, cover of Time magazine featured Days of Our Lives' Bill Hayes and Susan Seaforth Hayes, the only daytime actors ever to appear on its cover. The Hayeses themselves were a couple whose on-screen and real-life romance (they met on the series in 1970 and married in 1974) was widely covered by both the soap opera magazines and the mainstream press.

In the 1990s, the show branched out into supernatural storylines, which critics immediately panned, as it was seen as a departure from more realistic storylines for which the show had originally become known. However, these storylines did have the desired effect, making Days of Our Lives the most-watched daytime soap among young and middle-aged women, also becoming one of NBC's five most profitable shows in any time slot. In 2006, when asked about his character, Jack Deveraux, "coming back from the dead"—for the third time—actor Matthew Ashford responded, "It is hard to play that because at a certain point it becomes too unreal...actors look at that and think, 'What is this — the Cartoon Network'?" (Ironically, Jack – with Ashford in the role – would be killed off for a fourth time in an explosion-related elevator failure in August 2012, only to be brought from the dead once more in December 2018.)

In addition to receiving critical acclaim in print journalism, the series has won many awards, including a Daytime Emmy for Best Drama in 1978 and 2013 and a Writers Guild of America, East Award for Best Drama in 2000 and 2013. Days of Our Lives actors have also won awards: Macdonald Carey (Dr. Tom Horton) won Best Actor in 1974 and 1975. Susan Flannery (Laura Horton) and Eileen Davidson (Kristen DiMera) won Best Actress in 1975 and 2014, respectively. Suzanne Rogers (Maggie Horton), Leann Hunley (Anna DiMera), and Tamara Braun (Ava Vitali) won Best Supporting Actress for, respectively, 1979, 1986, and 2009 and Billy Warlock (Frankie Brady) won Best Younger Actor for 1988. In 2009, Darin Brooks (Max Brady) took home the Emmy for Best Younger Actor", and Tamara Braun (Ava Vitali) won for Best Supporting Actress, the show's first acting victories in over 21 and 23 years, respectively

As with all other network programming, Days of Our Lives' ratings have declined somewhat since the 1990s. In January 2007 it was suggested by NBC that the show "is unlikely to continue [on NBC] past 2009." In November 2008, in an eleventh-hour decision, it was announced the show had been renewed through September 2010. The 18-month renewal was down from its previous renewal, which was for five years. The show made somewhat of a comeback in 2009, with ratings increasing as the year progressed. In March 2010, the show was renewed once again through September 2011; then again on November 8, 2010, its 45th anniversary, the show was renewed for two more years through September 2013, with an option for an additional year which would keep the soap on through 2014, its 49th year on the air. The series received a two-year renewal in January 2014 that was set to last until September 2016. Beginning on November 8, 2010, which marked Days of Our Lives' 45th anniversary, the show began airing in high definition.

The show was officially "rebooted" on September 26, 2011, to gain back its lapsed audience, appeal to long-term loyal fans, begin new stories, and boost ratings. Former fan-favorite characters were reintroduced as part of the reboot. These included Jack Deveraux (Matthew Ashford), Carrie Brady (Christie Clark), and Austin Reed (Patrick Muldoon). All three, along with actress Sarah Brown, were fired from the show to lower production costs. The reboot was met with mixed reviews from critics. Head writers hired to handle the reboot, Marlene McPherson and Darrell Ray Thomas Junior were subsequently fired due to declining ratings. Chris Whitesell and former Days executive producer Gary Tomlin were rehired after being fired as part of the show's revamp. Daytime Emmy award winner Lorraine Broderick was hired as a member of the breakdown writing team in April 2012. Days of Our Lives is noted as the fourth longest running soap opera in the United States.

On November 30, 2014, NBC introduced an updated logo for Days of Our Lives at the 2014 Hollywood Christmas Parade, in celebration of the series' 50th anniversary. On February 11, 2016, NBC renewed Days of Our Lives for one-year, with the option of an additional year. In January 2017, while discussing the potential of renewal for the soap, NBC chairman Bob Greenblatt stated: "We don't make a decision for another couple months. [...] But I don't think it's over yet." In February 2017, NBC officially renewed Days of Our Lives for an additional year. Jennifer Salke, President of NBC Entertainment, said in a statement: "We feel so privileged to be able to continue the remarkable legacy of Days of our Lives. [...] We thank [exec producer] Ken Corday and his team for their incredible accomplishments and look forward to all the stories from Salem that will continue to unfold." In March 2018, NBC announced their decision to renew Days of Our Lives through fall 2019. In January 2019, NBC renewed the serial through September 2020. In a statement, NBC Entertainment said: "With writing that manages to weave together Salem's iconic characters with current realities, Ken Corday and his team have ushered the show's legacy into a new era that resonates with both longtime and new viewers."

On February 11, 2019, one month after NBC announced its renewal of Days for a 55th season, Corday Productions filed a breach of contract and fraud lawsuit against Sony Pictures Television (which has co-produced and handled international distribution of the series since original production backer Screen Gems was folded into the former Columbia Pictures Television in 1974) in the Los Angeles County Superior Court, alleging that Sony placed the soap at a competitive disadvantage favoring its higher-rated CBS rival, The Young and the Restless. The suit – which seeks restitution payments of more than $20 million – alleges that Sony Pictures had forced Corday (which maintains a revenue-sharing arrangement to split any profits and production costs above the budget, the latter of which is financed by NBC) to absorb budgetary production deficits, had provided them with inaccurate accounting, had failed to offer the show for distribution in certain foreign markets (including the United Kingdom and France) and had failed to pay profits within the eight-figure range as well as to negotiate a license fee with NBC that incurs a "reasonable profit" for Corday, while negotiating a more favorable license fee from CBS for its carriage of The Young and The Restless (even as Corday's share of distribution revenues decreased by over 50% in recent years). Corday also alleged that Sony Pictures executives have expressed indifference to Days of Our Lives, claiming that Sony Pictures Entertainment CEO Tony Vinciquerra said the soap is no longer a priority for the company and is "hanging by a thread." Representatives for Sony described the claims made in the suit as "meritless."

On November 12, 2019, TVLine reported that the entire cast was released from their contracts, in preparation for a previously planned production hiatus. Per reports, pending renewal, production will resume by March 2020. In a separate report, published by People, the shut down was known to cast and crew, for "scheduling reasons". Ten days later, Deadline Hollywood announced that the show had been renewed through September 2021. On January 29, 2020, NBC announced it had renewed the soap, and that production would resume in March; the following day, it was announced that cast and crew would return to set on February 3, 2020. In March 2020, it was announced that production on the soap was suspended pending "further notice," following the COVID-19 pandemic. In July 2020, it was announced that production on the soap would resume on September 1 of the same year. The following month, on October 12, Deadline Hollywood reported the soap was suspending production for two-weeks, following a positive COVID-19 test. Production resumed eight-days later on October 20.

In April 2021, production was paused, with NBC and Sony Pictures Television entering into renewal negotiations. The following month, it was announced NBC and Sony Pictures Television had reached a deal, renewing Days of Our Lives through September 2023. On March 15, 2023, Peacock renewed the soap for two additional years, through its 60th anniversary.

On July 25, 2023, Deadline Hollywood published a report claiming an investigation against co-executive producer Albert Alarr for misconduct. The investigation was launched following allegations of misconduct by Alarr – with 30–40 individuals interviewed, of which were predominately women – with claims that Alarr's behavior "had been present for years", and only increased among being named co-executive producer in 2015. The report also called Alarr "abusive", resulting in those feeling "uncomfortable and humiliated". In addition to Alarr's alleged misconduct, the article cited a "significant number of women who have left the show over the past couple of years including actresses who played major characters", while male actors were "bullied" on the set. Alarr was also quoted as saying "You're fucking horny, man, you just want to fuck her" during the filming of intimate scenes. The investigation also "examined an incident" in which Alarr was said to have "forcefully grabbed and kissed" one female actor on the set without warning or consent. Following a nine-week investigation, Alarr was given written warning and remained in his position. Following the report, several cast members – both past and present – spoke out in support of the report, including Lisa Rinna, who cited the work environment as "disgusting" when she filmed the first chapter of the spin-off series, Beyond Salem in 2021. Three days later, Deadline Hollywood reported production of the soap would shut down for one-week, beginning July 31. (Note: At the time of the report (July 28), production of Days of Our Lives was already on a one-week break, with production expected to resume on July 31, 2023.) On August 2, a subsequent report was published, claiming over 25 cast members had signed a petition, demanding Alarr's removal. The same report contained more details concerning the on-set misconduct; per the report, the cast is calling for an unnamed, respected director-producer to be named as Alarr's replacement. Two days later, on August 4, The Wrap announced Alarr had been let go. In a statement to cast and crew, Ken Corday announced Janet Drucker's promotion to co-executive producer. As a result of the investigation, Ken also announced additional HR protocols would be implemented, as well as "increased HR presence" while maintaining it was "imperative that we have a safe and inclusive workplace environment".

In February 2024, it was announced Arianne Zucker—recognized for her portrayal of Nicole Walker on the soap—filed a lawsuit against Corday Productions, Ken Corday, and Alarr, alleging sexual harassment, as well as wrongful termination. In the suit, Zucker claims she was "victim of nonconsensual sexual touching and inappropriate comments" by Alarr. She additionally claimed Ken provided a "take it or leave it" deal in October 2023, following her meetings in March and June of the same year with Sony and Human Resources. Reports claim Zucker concluded filming in the role of Nicole in January 2024. On August 8, 2024, a judge with the Los Angeles County Superior Court ruled in Zucker's favor, allowing her to "move ahead with the disputed portion of her complaint that's seeking a formal order" which would bar Alarr "from harassing behavior in any future workplace." In October 2025, a settlement was filed in Los Angeles County Superior Court.

In November 2024, it was announced the soap had been renewed through its 61st season, assuring its continuation through 2026. Days of Our Lives celebrated its 15,000th episode on December 2, 2024. The soap was renewed in July 2025, through its sixty-third season, which will occur during the 2027–2028 television season. In a statement, Ken Corday said, "This is a celebration for us without doubt, continuing with our NBCU family – 60 years this fall, and beyond. Our on- and off-screen family is excited to continue exploring and telling meaningful and fun stories for many, many more years to come."

== Notable storylines ==
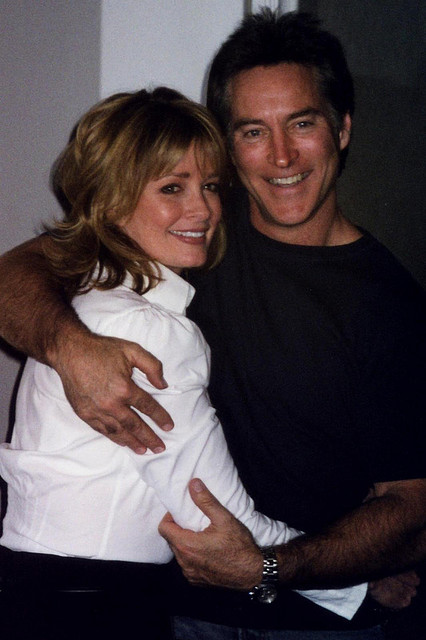
Long-time cast members Deidre Hall and Drake Hogestyn, who portray Marlena Evans and John Black, are known for being featured in some of the show's most famous storylines.

When Days of Our Lives premiered in 1965, the show revolved around the tragedies and triumphs of the suburban Horton family. Over time, additional families were brought into the show to interact with the Hortons and serve as springboards for more dramatic storylines. Originally led by patriarch Dr. Tom Horton and his wife, homemaker Alice, the Hortons remain a prominent fixture in current continuity. One of the longest-running story lines involved the rape of Mickey Horton's wife Laura by Mickey's brother Bill. Laura confides in her father-in-law Dr. Tom, and the two agree that her husband Mickey should never know. The secret, involving the true parentage of Michael Horton (a product of the rape) and Mickey's subsequent health issues as a result of the revelation, spanned episodes from 1968 to 1975. This plot line was made even more complex with the presence of Linda Patterson (originally Margaret Mason for many years, later Elaine Princi) who claimed that her daughter Melissa had been fathered by Mickey. When Mickey married the lovely Maggie Simmons (Suzanne Rogers), Linda became even more involved in the story line as the show's main villainess, marrying the wealthy Bob Anderson (Mark Tapscott) and taking over the running of Anderson Manufacturing when he became ill. The story line involving Mickey, Laura and Bill was the first to bring the show to prominence, and put it near the top of the Nielsen daytime ratings. Another love triangle, between lounge singer Doug Williams, Tom and Alice's daughter Addie, and Addie's own daughter, Julie, proved to be popular around the same time. The storyline culminated in the death of Addie in 1974 and the marriage of Doug and Julie in 1976.

In the early 1980s, the Brady and DiMera families were introduced, and their rivalry quickly cemented their places as core families in Salem beside the Hortons. Around the same time, with the help of head writers Sheri Anderson, Thom Racina, and Leah Laiman, action/adventure story lines and supercouples such as Bo and Hope, Shane and Kimberly, and Patch and Kayla reinvigorated the show, previously focused primarily on the domestic troubles of the Hortons. Since the 1990s, with the introduction of writer James E. Reilly, Days of Our Lives has moved from traditional plots to some supernatural and science-fiction-themed stories, in conjunction with the rivalry of good vs. evil, in a Hatfield/McCoy feud style the Bradys versus the DiMeras. Under the tenure of Reilly, ratings rose to number two, and stayed there until he left in 1999 to start his own creation of Passions. Despite the introduction of new head writer Hogan Sheffer in 2006, ratings failed to revive, which led the show's producers to hire a few past fan favorites to stop the ratings hemorrhage.

=== Best-remembered stories ===
In addition to the love triangles of Bill/Laura/Mickey and Addie/Doug/Julie, other memorable storylines include the 1968 story of amnesiac Tom Horton Jr., who returns from Korea believing he is someone else and then proceeds to romance his younger sister Marie; the 20-year tragic love triangle when John Black has an affair with Marlena Brady, who is married to Roman; the 1982 "Salem Strangler" (Jake Kositchek, who was nicknamed "Jake the Ripper") who stalks and murders women; the 1984 Gone with the Wind story line in which Hope Williams Brady and Bo Brady hide out on a Southern plantation and dress up as Scarlett O'Hara and Rhett Butler (devised to keep viewers tuned in while rival network ABC's soaps were preempted due to the 1984 Summer Olympics); and "The Cruise of Deception" in 1990, when madman Ernesto Toscano invites all his enemies aboard a ship, the S.S. Loretta, and holds them captive.

In 1992, the show was retooled with additions such as refurbished sets, the debut of the Brady Pub, the addition of new characters such as Vivian Alamain, Lisanne Gardner, Billie Reed, and Kate Roberts. Later that same year, Days of Our Lives introduced its highly popular teen scene with new characters such as Carrie Brady, played by Tracy Middendorf, and then back to Christie Clark again; a SORASed Sami Brady, played by Alison Sweeney; Lucas Roberts played by Bryan Dattilo; Austin Reed portrayed by Patrick Muldoon and later, Austin Peck; Abe Carver's younger brother Jonah Carver, played by Thyme Lewis; Jamie Caldwell, played by Miriam Parish; and Wendy Reardon played by Tammy Townsend. These additions were to appeal to younger viewers. By 1997, the romantic dilemmas of Carrie, Austin, Mike, and Sami, and the Will Horton paternity issue and custody battle storylines had become a focal point of the series.

The shocking and ratings-grabbing 1993 plot when Vivian Alamain buried Dr. Carly Manning alive (the first controversial storyline from head writer Reilly); and the 1994–1995 storyline in which the town's Christmas tree burns down and Marlena becomes possessed in Exorcist fashion.

From 1993 to 1998, actress Eileen Davidson portrayed several characters from the same family in the series. Her main character, the villainous Kristen DiMera, suffers a miscarriage in secret, and in a panic to keep her love John Black away from Marlena, Kristen pretends to still be pregnant with John's child. Stefano hires a doppelganger, Susan Banks, to conceive and bear a child for her (which resulted in the birth of EJ DiMera). Eileen Davidson portrayed the entire Banks family clan, four in total (including one male), as well as her main character. Davidson received her first Daytime Emmy nomination in 1997 for Outstanding Lead Actress in a Drama Series.

The year 2000 saw the departures of cast members Louise Sorel as Vivian Alamain and Jensen Ackles as Eric Brady. Ken Corday and NBC announced plans to re-introduce a SORAS Brady Black, immediately following the conclusion of Eric's storyline. That spring, Kyle Lowder was cast as the new Brady Black, who would now be aged to his early 20s, first appearing on August 21, 2000, a month following Eric's exit. Brady was romantically linked to the character of Chloe Lane. The pair married and left town in 2005, when Lowder's contract was not renewed.

2003–2004's "Salem Stalker" & "Melaswen" storylines, saw several characters purportedly die at the hands of a masked psychopath; they are later revealed to have been kidnapped to the secret island of Melaswen (New Salem spelled backward). 2007's "Bradys and DiMeras: The Reveal", told the story regarding how the Brady/DiMera feud started.

Past characters returned in June 2010 to honor the passing of matriarch Alice Horton, whose character died on June 23, 2010. On June 23, 2011, Days of Our Lives introduced Sonny Kiriakis, the show's first contract gay character onto the canvas to be featured in the show's first gay story line. Freddie Smith (Sonny) said in an interview, "He's very confident and mature, he's traveled the world and is very open-minded. I'm very excited to portray him." After Sonny's arrival, Will Horton investigates his own sexuality, and reveals himself to be gay. He later starts a romantic relationship with Sonny. They eventually marry.

On January 26, 2012, episode 11765 was a tribute to soldiers who have served in Afghanistan and previous wars with a PTSD therapy group for Jack Deveraux to talk over his time held captive there. This was also when the inline "Next On" promos were discontinued in favor of an external weekly promo.

== Cast ==
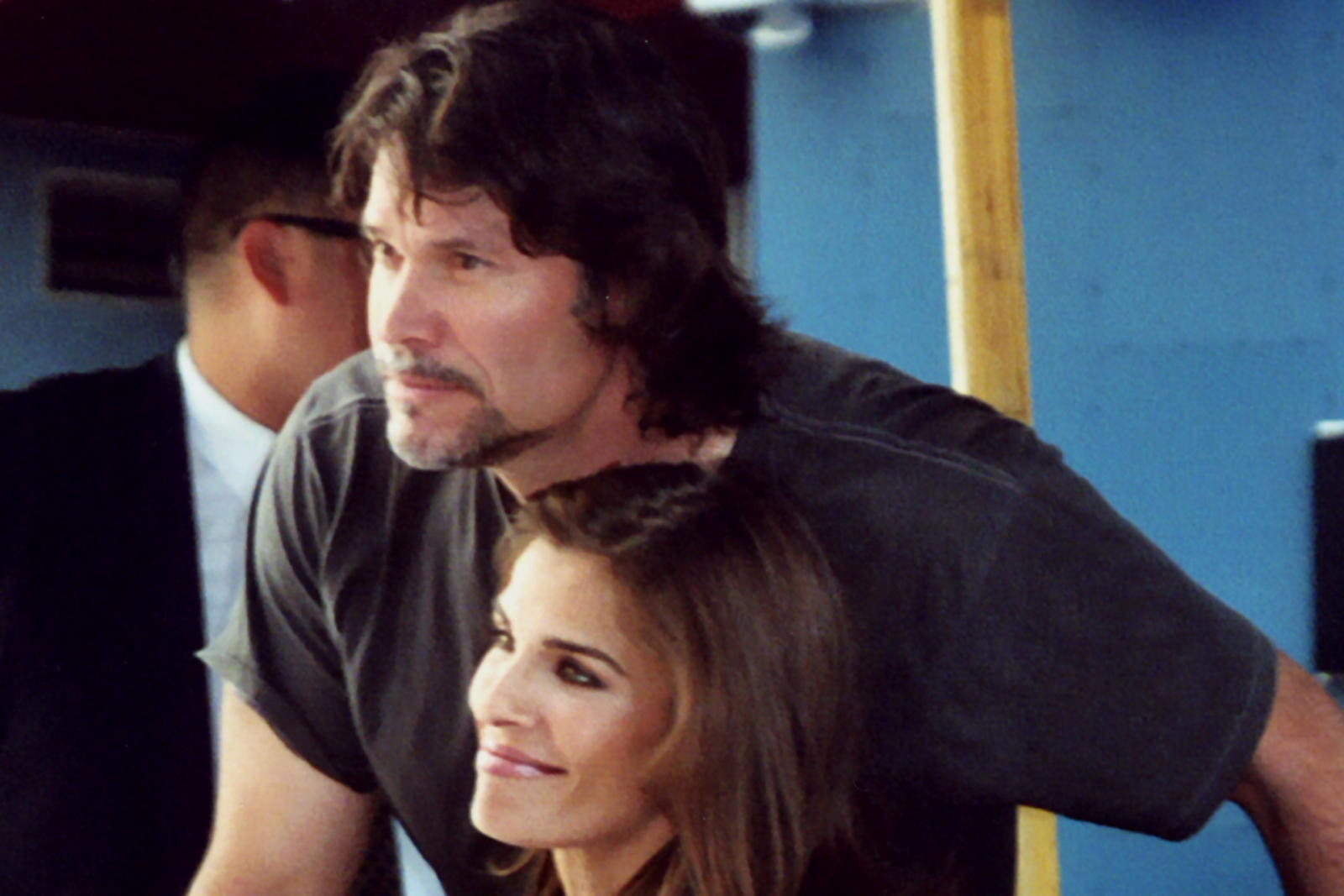
Veteran actors Peter Reckell and Kristian Alfonso, who portrayed supercouple Bo and Hope Brady on and off for 30 years.

When Days of Our Lives debuted, the cast consisted of seven main characters: Tom Horton, Alice Horton, Mickey Horton, Marie Horton, Julie Olson, Tony Merritt and Craig Merritt. When the show expanded to one hour in April 1975, the cast increased to 27 actors. By the 25th anniversary in 1990, 40 actors appeared on the show in contract or recurring roles, which is the approximate number of actors the show has used since then.

Original cast member Frances Reid, who played Alice Horton, remained on contract with Days of Our Lives until her death on February 3, 2010, though she made her last appearance on the show in December 2007. Original cast member John Clarke, who played Mickey Horton, left the series in 2004. Suzanne Rogers, who plays Maggie Horton has been on the show since 1973, and Susan Seaforth Hayes has played Julie Olson Williams since 1968 with a few breaks in-between, and also her husband Bill Hayes, who has played Doug Williams since 1970, though neither Seaforth Hayes nor Hayes is employed with the serial on contract.

In recent years, Days of Our Lives has hired back many former cast members. Twenty of the current contract cast members have been with the show, off-and-on, since at least 1999. Since 2005, cast members from the 1980s and 1990s, such as Christie Clark (Carrie Brady), Stephen Nichols (Steve "Patch" Johnson), Austin Peck (Austin Reed), Mary Beth Evans (Kayla Brady), Joseph Mascolo (Stefano DiMera), and Thaao Penghlis (Tony DiMera and Andre DiMera) have been brought back to Days of Our Lives. More additions to the show in recent years have included the returns of Crystal Chappell (Dr. Carly Manning), and Louise Sorel (Vivian Alamain). In June 2010, characters such as Jennifer Horton (Melissa Reeves, who returned to the show full-time shortly afterward), Bill Horton (John H. Martin, taking over the role from Christopher Stone), Shane Donovan (Charles Shaughnessy) and Kimberly Brady (Patsy Pease) returned for a short time and were featured heavily in a tribute to Alice Horton.

In late 2012, the show reintroduced Eileen Davidson in the role of Kristen Blake DiMera – one of six characters Davidson played during her original 1993–98 run on the show – after a fourteen-year absence. In mid-2013, the show debuted new characters such as JJ Deveraux (Casey Moss) and Theresa Donovan (Jen Lilley) to appeal to younger viewers.

In celebration of the soap's fiftieth anniversary in 2015, several cast members returned to the soap, including Peter Reckell (Bo Brady, who was killed off in a decision by Corday and the show's writing staff in a move to provide closure in the relationship of Bo and Hope), Stephen Nichols and Penghlis (as Andre DiMera, as his brother, Tony, had been killed off in 2009).

== Executive producing and head writing team ==
Co-creator and original executive producer Ted Corday was only at the helm of Days of Our Lives for eight months before dying of cancer in 1966. His widow and fellow co-creator, Betty, was named executive producer upon his death. She continued in that role, with the help of H. Wesley Kenney and Al Rabin as supervising producers, before she semi-retired from showrunning duties in 1985, two years prior to her death in 1987. Upon Mrs. Corday's semi-retirement, her son, Ken, became executive producer and took over the full-time, day-to-day running of the show. Ken Corday continues helming the show to this day, and as of August 2023, splits show-running duties with Drucker as co-executive producer.

The first long-term head writer, William J. Bell, started writing for Days of Our Lives in 1966 and continued with the show until 1975, two years after he had created his own successful soap, The Young and the Restless, for rival network CBS. He continued with the show as a storyline consultant until 1978. During the late 1970s and early 1980s, many changes to the head writer position occurred. In the early 1980s, Margaret DePriest helped stabilize the show with her serial killer storyline. Later head writers, such as Sheri Anderson, Thom Racina, and Leah Laiman, built on that stability and crafted storylines of their own, temporarily helping to bringing up the program's ratings. Many head writer changes occurred after Laiman left the series in 1989 and the role would not become stable again until James E. Reilly joined the show in that role in 1993. His tenure, which lasted for four-and-a-half years and featured several supernatural-themed plotlines (which would later become the centerpiece of fellow NBC soap Passions, when the Reilly-created series debuted in July 1999), was credited with bringing ratings up to the second place spot in the Nielsens. Other writers who succeeded him, such as Sally Sussman Morina and Tom Langan, failed to keep the ratings success, and additional head writer turnovers continued until Reilly – who would continue in his role as head writer and consulting producer of Passions after rejoining Days – returned to the series in 2003.

Five-time Daytime Emmy winner Hogan Sheffer was named head writer with great fanfare in October 2006, but lasted less than 16 months with the show, with his last episode airing in January 2008. Former head writer Dena Higley was re-promoted to succeed Sheffer in the role, with her first episode as head of the writing staff airing on April 23, 2008; her co-head writer was Christopher Whitesell, who had joined the series following a stint as an associate head writer for As the World Turns and remained with Days until February 2011. On May 18, 2011, Dena Higley was fired, and replaced as head writer with Marlene McPherson and Darrell Ray Thomas Jr. (who had previously worked alongside James E. Reilly as script writers on Passions).

On April 4, 2012, it was confirmed that McPherson and Thomas were fired as co-head writers, and would be replaced by Whitesell and former Days script writer Gary Tomlin. Two days later, it was confirmed that former All My Children head writer Lorraine Broderick would join Tomlin and Whitesell as a breakdown writer on the series. On February 9, 2015, Soap Opera Digest confirmed that both Tomlin and Whitesell had been ousted in their roles as head writers; the magazine further confirmed that former head writer Higley would return, alongside former The Young and the Restless head writer Josh Griffith; the change took effect on February 16, 2015. In August 2015, reports stated that Higley would be taking a leave of absence from the show. In her place, Sony would be sending a writer from The Young and the Restless – later revealed to be former head writer Beth Milstein – to help Griffith with the transition.

In February 2016, several days after the show was renewed for a 52nd season, Soap Opera Digest exclusively reported that Griffith had departed the show as head writer with Higley remaining; the magazine further revealed that script writer Ryan Quan had been promoted to replace Griffith. On January 23, 2017, Soap Opera Digest confirmed that both Higley and Quan had been let go from their positions as co-head writers, with Higley being let go from the program altogether and Quan being installed in the newly created title of creative consultant. Former One Life to Live and General Hospital head writer Ron Carlivati was named as Higley's replacement, "effective immediately"; Carlivati's first episode as head writer aired on July 19, 2017. In addition to Carlivati's appointment, it was also announced that Sheri Anderson would return to the soap, sharing the role of creative consultant with Quan. In February 2019, Carlivati announced he had signed a new deal to continue as head writer; that same month, Anderson announced her departure from the writing team. In July 2020, it was reported that Greg Meng had been let go after more than 30 years with the soap and Corday Productions.

On August 4, 2023, Alarr was replaced by Drucker as co-executive producer, following allegations of misconduct on the part of Alarr and internal investigations. On July 19, 2024, it was announced Carlivati had departed the soap as head writer, with Paula Cwikly and Jeanne Marie Ford named as his successors "effective immediately". Due to the soap's advanced taping schedule, Carlivati's material was seen through April 23, 2025. On March 28, 2025, it was announced Drucker would retire, with her last day on set being May 2; Noel Maxam was named as her successor. In May 2026, it was reported Quan had returned as co-head writer, alongside Ford, following Cwikly's decision to retire. The following month, Ken Corday announced Quan's return, along with Cwikly's decision to step down as co-head writer and remain on as a consultant. Quan's material with Ford is expecting to begin broadcasting in mid-2027.

== Broadcast ==
=== Domestic broadcast ===
Episodes of Days of Our Lives were first made available on digital platforms in July 2003, when SoapCity, a now-defunct website owned by Sony Pictures Digital Networks, began offering same-day and archived episodes (dating back to the series' 1965 premiere) for streaming or direct download via its SoapCity Download subscription offering (available on either a monthly subscription or on a discounted pay-per-episode basis). In June 2007, episodes of the series began to be offered via iTunes.

Under an agreement reached with Sony Pictures Television in March 2004, cable network Soapnet began airing same-day rebroadcasts of Days of Our Lives each weeknight at 7:00 and 11:00 p.m. (later 8:00 and 10:00 p.m.) Eastern and Pacific Time (with classic episodes sometimes filling the slot during NBC-predetermined preemptions), along with a (usually) five-hour-long weekend block of the past week's episodes; Days aired on the network until its closure in December 2013. On August 24, 2015, Pop began airing same-day rebroadcasts of the show as part of an early-prime-time soap opera repeat block that included CBS soaps The Young and the Restless and The Bold and the Beautiful. (CBS's namesake parent, CBS Corporation, owns the cable channel and operated it as a joint venture with Lionsgate at the time.) Pop dropped Days of Our Lives from its lineup after the April 15, 2016, broadcast.

NBC began making same-day episodes of Days available for streaming on the show's NBC.com subpage on August 10, 2009. The ten most recent episodes are available for viewing, with each episode being streamable for 16 days after their original airdate. Recent episodes of the series were also available on Hulu from 2008 until August 2015, when the streaming service abruptly removed Days from its NBC program offerings, leaving General Hospital as the only remaining American daytime soap among Hulu's offerings.

==== Broadcast history ====
For its first three years on the air, Days of Our Lives was near the bottom of the Nielsen ratings, and at high risk of cancellation. However, its ascent to the top was rapid; as the 1968–69 television season ended, it became an effective tool of NBC, which attempted to dethrone daytime leader CBS. By 1973, the show – pitted against CBS's popular Guiding Light and ABC's The Newlywed Game at 2:00 p.m. (ET)/1:00 p.m. (CT) – had matched the first-place soap ratings of As the World Turns and fellow NBC soap Another World. Due to the success of the program, NBC expanded Days from a 30-minute timeslot to 60 minutes on April 21, 1975. This expansion had followed the lead of Another World, which became the first hour-long television soap opera 3½ months earlier on January 6. Furthermore, Days of Our Lives' new starting time of 1:30 p.m. (ET)/12:30 (CT) finally solved a scheduling problem that began in 1968 when NBC lost the rights to the game show Let's Make a Deal to ABC, and in its wake, eight different shows were placed into the slot (Hidden Faces, You're Putting Me On, Life with Linkletter, Words & Music, Memory Game, Three on a Match, Jeopardy!, and How to Survive a Marriage) to little to no success.

However, this first golden period for NBC's daytime lineup proved to be short-lived, as viewership for Days of Our Lives began to decline in 1977. Much of this dropoff was associated with ABC's expansion of its increasingly popular soap All My Children to a full hour, the last half of which overlapped with the first half-hour of Days of Our Lives and CBS' As The World Turns, which had also aired at 1:30 p.m. since it premiered in April 1956. By January 1979, the network, in a mode of desperation more than anything else, decided to jump headlong against All My Children and moved the show ahead to the same 1:00 p.m./12 Noon timeslot. In exchange to its affiliates for taking away the old half-hour access slot at 1:00/Noon, NBC gave them the 4:00 p.m./3:00 slot, the offerings of which many (if not most) of the network's stations had been preempting for years anyway. By 1986, ABC and CBS followed suit, under the intense pressure of lucrative (and cheap) syndicated programming offered to affiliates.

By 1980, Days of Our Lives had displaced Another World as NBC's highest-rated soap. Overall, though, the entire NBC soap lineup had been experiencing trouble maintaining ratings traction against its competitors on CBS and ABC. In fact, by 1982, all of its shows were rated above only one ABC soap (The Edge of Night) and below all four CBS soaps. The "supercouple" era of the 1980s, however, helped bring about a ratings revival, and the 1983–84 season saw Days of Our Lives experience a surge in ratings. It held onto its strong numbers for most of the 1980s, only to decline again by 1990, eventually falling back into eighth place. As Another World underwent its final ratings slump during the second half of the 1990s, many affiliates swapped the time slots of Another World and Days of Our Lives, which usually aired an hour earlier.

While individual NBC affiliates had the right to air any show whenever they wished, most of the affiliates (almost all of them, in the earlier days of television) aired the show when the feed was transmitted from the network.

In the mid-1990s, however, the show experienced a resurgence in popularity, and the show reached number two in the ratings, where it remained for several years before experiencing another ratings decline beginning in 1999, the year that Days of Our Lives became NBC's longest-running daytime program (upon the cancellation of Another World). Throughout the 2000s (decade), Days of Our Lives and all the other remaining network daytime serials (four were left as of 2021) have witnessed a steady erosion of viewers, mainly due to vastly altered viewing habits induced by cable networks and alternative genres such as reality and talk shows on minor network affiliates.

On January 17, 2007, NBC Universal Television president Jeff Zucker remarked that Days of Our Lives would most likely not "continue past 2009." This contributed to an immediate ratings decline for Days of Our Lives. The show, which was averaging a 2.4 rating prior to the announcement, dropped to a 2.2 average household rating in the months after. In an April 2007 interview with Soap Opera Digest, executive producer Ken Corday commented on the ratings decline of the previous months, "If I don't pay attention to the ratings and what the viewers are saying, I'm an ostrich. I have not seen a decline in the ratings on the show this precipitous — ever. I've never seen this much of a percentage decline."

Days of Our Lives had finished the 2008–2009 television season with a substantial increase in viewers (3.0 million vs. 2.8 million) and had risen to the No. 3 spot behind The Young and the Restless and The Bold and the Beautiful, respectively. It was the No. 2 daytime program behind The Young and the Restless in the much-coveted 18–49 demographic. During the first few months of the 2009–2010 season, Days of Our Lives increased its average household rating to 2.4, and averaged consistently over 3,000,000 viewers. It was only one point behind the No. 2 daytime drama The Bold and the Beautiful, and beat that soap on several days during the season. In 2010, Days of Our Lives continued to increase viewership, reaching as high as 3.6 million viewers on several days. A substantial increase in viewership such as Days of Our Lives had during that time also bucked the viewership trend in daytime dramas, which had declined since the 1990s for all other daytime drama series. Days of Our Lives was the only daytime drama series to increase in viewers between 2008 and 2010 and had reduced its operating budget, making it a profitable asset to NBC's broadcast lineup.

However starting in 2011, while ABC canceled both All My Children and One Life to Live, Days of Our Lives started to lose ground significantly to the point that it sometimes occupied the last position among all soaps for both total viewership and the 18–49 women demographic. The cancellation of All My Children on ABC combined with the return of several cast members allowed a brief resurgence of Days of Our Lives in October 2011, but ratings soon declined again. In December 2011, before the cancellation of One Life to Live, Days of Our Lives recorded three consecutive weeks of new lows in the 18–49 female key demographic category, and again another consecutive three weeks of low ratings in the same demographic group during March and April 2012.

As of 2012, Days of Our Lives generally ranked No. 3 among the four remaining daytime soap operas on the air when it came to the total number of viewers (surpassing only General Hospital). However, Days of Our Lives was lowest-rated among all soap operas for the numbers of viewers in the targeted demographic of women aged between 18 and 49 years old.

==== Local scheduling variations ====
From 2019 until 2022, most NBC stations aired Days of Our Lives at 1:00 p.m. local time, while several stations aired the program at other times in their respective markets. Since January 1993, after the cancellation of Santa Barbara, WPXI-TV in Pittsburgh had aired Days of Our Lives weekdays at 3:00 pm, while some stations such as WJAC-TV in Johnstown, Pennsylvania, aired the program at 2:00 pm. Some Central Time Zone affiliates carried the program at 12:00 p.m. in tandem with NBC's Eastern Time Zone feed; one example was WGBA-TV in Green Bay, Wisconsin, which used it as an alternative to programming what would likely be a low-rated local newscast against long-established local competition. NBC's flagship station WNBC-TV aired the program with a 12:00 pm. ET scheduling.

One NBC station, KSNV-DT in Las Vegas, stopped carrying the show on August 19, 2013, due to a long-term move to an all-news schedule outside of network news and primetime programming; the program moved to the market's CW affiliate KVCW, where it aired at its traditional 1:00 p.m. time slot until an ownership change saw the show return to KSNV in late December 2014 as part of a change in the all-news plans. Salt Lake City's KSL-TV moved the show to late nights at 1:05 a.m. on September 9, 2013, for unknown reasons, though it was rumored to be due to a romantic plot between gay characters Will Horton and Sonny Kiriakis; the station is owned by Bonneville International, a commercial broadcasting arm of the LDS Church.

==== Move to streaming ====
On August 3, 2022, it was announced that NBCUniversal would move Days of Our Lives exclusively to Peacock beginning September 12, 2022, after a 57-year run on NBC. The show was replaced in its timeslot by NBC News Daily, which competes primarily with ABC's GMA3: What You Need to Know. NBCUniversal Television and Streaming chairman Mark Lazarus stated that the move would "[enable] us to build the show's loyal fanbase on streaming while simultaneously bolstering the network daytime offering with an urgent, live programming opportunity for partners and consumers." With the move, NBC became the first "Big Three" network not to air any daytime soap operas, leaving only three daytime soap operas (ABC's General Hospital, and CBS's The Bold and the Beautiful and The Young and the Restless) remaining on broadcast television overall. A fourth, Beyond the Gates, premiered on CBS in February 2025.

In an April 2025 report by Luminate, Days of Our Lives was named the second-top streaming program on Peacock, behind the American adaptation of the Love Island franchise. The company made further claims that in 31 out of 32 reported weeks, the sixtieth season of the serial appeared on their list of Top 50 Streaming Original TV Shows. The fifty-ninth season ranked at number two with 3.1 billion minutes watched, while the sixtieth season ranked at number four with 2.4 billion minutes watched, on Peacock, respectively.

=== Nielsen ratings history ===
End of season number of metered viewers (listed as a Nielsen share in millions) and ranking (against other soap operas) from the first broadcast to the reporting week of August 24 to 28, 2015.

Days of Our Lives ratings history (1965–1984)
Season	Share	Ranking
1 (1965)	5.3	10/17
2 (1966)	6.9	10/13
3 (1967)	8.7	10/13
4 (1968)	9.3	5/14
5 (1969)	8.8	7/19
6 (1970)	9.4	4/18
7 (1971)	9.9	3/17
8 (1972)	9.9	2/17
9 (1973)	9.7	1/16
10 (1974)	9.7	2/14
11 (1975)	8.3	4/14
12 (1976)	7.8	7/15
13 (1977)	6.9	10/14
14 (1978)	6.8	10/14
15 (1979)	6.6	10/13
16 (1980)	5.6	9/13
17 (1981)	5.5	10/15
18 (1982)	5.7	8/14
19 (1983)	7.1	7/14
20 (1984)	7.1	6/14

Days of Our Lives ratings history (1985–2004)
Season	Share	Ranking
21 (1985)	7.2	5/13
22 (1986)	7.0	4/14
23 (1987)	7.1	5/12
24 (1988)	6.5	5/13
25 (1989)	5.4	7/12
26 (1990)	5.2	7/12
27 (1991)	5.4	7/11
28 (1992)	4.9	8/11
29 (1993)	5.6	6/10
30 (1994)	5.3	6/10
31 (1995)	5.8	2/11
32 (1996)	5.8	2/12
33 (1997)	5.1	2/11
34 (1998)	5.8	2/12
35 (1999)	4.2	3/11
36 (2000)	3.8	3/10
37 (2001)	3.6	3/10
38 (2002)	3.1	4/10
39 (2003)	3.1	4/10
40 (2004)	2.7	5/9

Days of Our Lives ratings history (2005–2021)
Season	Share	Ranking
41 (2005)	2.6	4/9
42 (2006)	2.3	6/9
43 (2007)	2.1	5/8
44 (2008)	2.2	3/8
45 (2009)	2.2	3/7
46 (2010)	2.0	4/6
47 (2011)	2.0	5/5
48 (2012)	2.1	4/4
49 (2013)	1.85	4/4
50 (2014)	2.05	4/4
51 (2015)	1.8	4/4
52 (2016)	1.6	4/4
53 (2017)	1.6	4/4
54 (2018)	1.6	4/4
55 (2019)	1.4	4/4
56 (2020)	1.2	4/4
57 (2021)	1.2	4/4
58 (2022)	1.6	4/4

Days of Our Lives primetime ratings history
Primetime Episode	Share	Ranking
"One Stormy Night" (1992)	10.5	64/92
"Night Sins" (1993)	7.9	72/87
"Winter Heat" (1994)	8.0	78/94
#7315 (1994)	6.3	64/91
#7316 (1994)	6.1	68/91

=== International broadcast ===
==== Americas ====
In Barbados the show was popular, though it ran several years behind the U.S. (the series began in Barbados in 1980 from the very first episode), and was aired on the island's lone television broadcaster, CBC TV 8. In 2014, the channel dropped the series.

The series previously aired on Global in Canada; concurrent with the move to Peacock in the U.S., it moved to sister cable channel W Network starting September 12, 2022.

==== Oceania ====
In Australia, Days of Our Lives was initially broadcast on the Nine Network from March 25, 1968, until April 26, 2013, when the network axed the show based on a commercial decision. During its run on the Nine Network in the early 2000s, episodes ended up being nearly five years behind the United States, due to the network's coverage of cricket each summer. In an attempt to get viewers up to date with the US, Nine aired a one-hour special on September 13, 2004, titled, Days of Our Lives: A New Day, which summarized four years of storylines and caused mixed feelings among regular viewers. This special was followed by episodes airing at the same pace as the US. However, the show ended up being behind the US again, and by April 2013, episodes were airing at a delay of 16 months. On June 17, 2013, Days of Our Lives resumed to Australian viewers free and on-demand through Sony's Crackle service, as well as across Crackle's web apps on mobile devices, connected TVs and game consoles. Crackle picked up where the Nine Network left off with 10 new episodes in its first week and seven new episodes every Monday thereafter. From January 20, 2014, Crackle began releasing five episodes each week.

Days of Our Lives returned to Australian television on Foxtel's channel Arena in April 2014. It airs weekdays before The Young and the Restless at 12:00 pm AEST. To bring TV viewers up to date, Arena screened ten catch up episodes, each presented by Days of Our Lives cast members, from April 1 to 14, 2014, featuring key story lines missed during the 11-month Australian television hiatus. Then on April 15, 2014, Arena began airing episodes at the same pace as the US. Arena also re-airs the last five aired episodes shown as an omnibus catch up edition each Sunday around 7:00 am AEST.

New Zealand has aired Days of Our Lives since July 7, 1975, debuting on Television New Zealand (TVNZ). Originally airing weekdays on TV One was shifted to TV2 in 1989, where it was put in a 1 pm timeslot. It moved back to TV One in 2003, where it was shown at 2 pm. The soap was approximately five seasons behind the NBC season due to being preempted by holiday and sporting programming. During October 2009, TVNZ announced that they were ending their exclusive contract with Sony Pictures. Despite a national petition from fans Days of Our Lives ended on May 19, 2010. On February 27, 2013, nearly three years the series' final broadcast on TVNZ, ChoiceTV announced their decision to pick up the series; the series began broadcasting on March 11, 2013, weekdays at 1:30 pm. Broadcasting began with the series' 46th season (2011–12), meaning the show would be only 18 months behind the current NBC season in the US. Choice TV also re-airs the last five aired episodes shown as an omnibus catch up edition each Sunday, beginning at 9 am NZST, when due to government broadcasting restrictions are shown without advertisements. By December 20, 2013, Choice TV had removed the show from their schedule for summer hiatus. However, the series resumed airing on February 10, 2014 from episode 11,880.

==== United Kingdom ====
From January to December 2020, Days of Our Lives aired in the United Kingdom on the Sony Channel with episodes from 2018. The show was pulled from schedules in December 2020 with no explanation given. The serial had previously aired on four other UK satellite and digital TV channels: Living (was UK Living, then Living TV, and is now Sky Witness) broadcast it weekdays 14:00 and midnight from 1993 to 1994. It formed part of the new channel's first ever daytime line-up, but it was dropped after only 12 months. A few years later in 1998, Sky Soap started broadcasting it weekdays at 12:00 but this only lasted for 6 months, being taken off shortly before the channel closed in 1999. Following the end of Sunset Beach on Channel 5 in 2000, they bought Days of our Lives as its replacement, however, it didn't catch on, and was cancelled after a year. During 2007–08, it aired on Zone Romantica twice daily, but the channel lasted less than two years.

== Opening title sequences and theme song ==
Original main title; the registered trademark next to the title was later removed.

Almost unchanged since the show's debut in November 1965, Days of Our Lives's title sequence shows an hourglass, with sand trickling to the bottom against the backdrop of a partly cloudy sky, accompanied by the spoken words, "Like sands through the hourglass, so are the Days of Our Lives." The title sequence has been modified only three times since the series first premiered:

- In 1972, the sequence was updated to display the hourglass against a brighter, cloud-laden background; the camera subsequently zooms toward the bottom half of the hourglass as the original variant of the program's current mixed-case serif logo (which replaced the older-style, all-capital title logo used since the show's debut) fades in;
- Beginning with the June 21, 1993, episode, the opening titles were changed to an animated visual of the hourglass (designed by Wayne Fitzgerald and Judy Loren), with its base and columns seen rotating throughout and the object zooming outward from the bottom glass partition to show it in full; the horizon backdrop was also changed to an evolving daylight motif incorporating changing cloudscapes and a brightening sun (as it rises over the horizon) emanating the title logo on-screen via a ripple effect animation;
- Beginning with the November 8, 2010, episode, with the show's conversion to HD, an updated widescreen version of the sequence was introduced; although it differs very little from the 1993 version of the sequence, this variant featured slight changes in the coloring of the sky backdrop.

The hourglass sequence was also used during the show's closing credits until November 2001 (when the network replaced it with a split-screen generic credit reel to incorporate video promos for other NBC daytime and prime time programs); it was replaced thereafter with a black background in international and, later, online airings. A sunset variant of the CGI sequence (which had been used for the closing credits from 1993 to 2001) remains in use as Corday Productions' closing credit vanity card.

Days of Our Lives opening theme (1973)
Narrated by Macdonald Carey

From the show's debut in 1965 until March 1966, announcer Ed Prentiss spoke the aforementioned opening phrase, following it with the notation "Days of Our Lives, a new dramatic serial starring Macdonald Carey." Carey, who had played Dr. Thomas Horton since the show's premiere, took over reading the opening sequence in April 1966; for the following 28 years, his introductory voiceover added with "This is Macdonald Carey, and these are the Days of Our Lives." After Carey's death from lung cancer in April 1994, the secondary part of the introduction was removed from the sequence out of respect for Carey and his family. At intermission (between 1975 and 2011), Carey also voiced the show's mid-program bumper – which usually preceded a network promo that led into the local ad breaks during the fourth commercial break of each episode – reading, "We will return for the second half of Days of Our Lives in just a moment."

The light orchestral theme music that accompanies the opening titles was composed by Charles Albertine, Tommy Boyce, and Bobby Hart, and was the first soap opera theme to be performed by an orchestral ensemble. Boyce and Hart were tasked by Ted and Betty Corday to create a theme for the show that sounded similar to "Sunrise, Sunset," which the Cordays had recently heard while seeing the Broadway version of Fiddler on the Roof. After the Cordays approved their third submission, reminiscent of organ music Hart remembered hearing when his mother listened to radio soaps, Albertine was brought in to write the orchestration for the piece, adding a flute-and-bells broken arpeggio borrowed from his 1952 piece "Music for Barefoot Ballerinas", and a bridge section for the extended theme music. The theme has only been updated twice: in 1993, when a more conventional orchestral arrangement of the instrumental theme (arranged by musical director Steven Reinhardt) debuted with the introduction of the CGI sequence, and in May 2004, when a grander orchestration was introduced, coincident with the revelation that the characters thought to have been killed by the Salem Stalker had actually been carried off to the island of Melaswen. This version was only used in eight episodes, before reverting to the 1993 arrangement that has remained in use ever since. In June 2009, the instrumental theme was abbreviated to allow extra airtime for the episodic plot, shortening it from 32 to 17 seconds and commencing from the orchestral flourish.

== Spin-offs ==
=== Days of Our Lives: Beyond Salem ===
In July 2021, Peacock ordered a five-episode limited series titled Days of Our Lives: Beyond Salem. The original cast's Rinna and Hall, among others, appeared. Clark, Jackée Harry, Peck, Penghlis, Hunley, and Davidson were also cast. The series premiered on September 6, 2021, and ran until September 10. A second chapter of five episodes was announced in April 2022, scheduled to premiere from July 11 to 15, 2022. The casting of Alfonso and Reckell was announced the same day. On June 2, 2022, it was announced Davidson, Christopher Sean, Vince Van Patten, and Loretta Devine had also been cast.

=== Days of Our Lives: A Very Salem Christmas ===
In November 2021, Corday Productions announced a spin-off holiday film titled Days of Our Lives: A Very Salem Christmas with Chandler Massey and Davidson starring. The film premiered on December 16, 2021, on Peacock. Alison Sweeney was also cast.

== Parodies ==
=== Friends ===
Days of Our Lives was partially parodied in the 1994–2004 NBC sitcom Friends, in which main character Joey Tribbiani (Matt LeBlanc) played the fictional Days character Dr. Drake Ramoray in a storyline that began with him being cast in the role in the Season 2 episode "The One With Russ". Incidentally, Friends co-lead actress Jennifer Aniston (who played Rachel Green in the series) is the daughter of John Aniston, who portrayed Victor Kiriakis on Days of Our Lives from 1985 until his death in 2022. The storyline itself, however, was paradoxical as Friends was set in New York City, whereas Days of Our Lives is shot in Burbank, California. Subsequent episodes featured Days of Our Lives storylines invented for the sitcom, and included some guest appearances by real-life cast members from the soap opera.

Joey's initial Days stint came to an end eight episodes later in "The One Where Dr. Ramoray Dies," in which his character was killed off by falling down an elevator shaft in retaliation for claiming during a Soap Opera Digest interview that he wrote most of his lines, angering the soap's writers. Later, in the Season 7 episode "The One With Joey's New Brain," the Drake Ramoray character was brought back to life thanks to a brain transplant from the in-universe, fictional Days character Jessica Lockhart (Susan Sarandon, who played Jessica's in-universe portrayer, Cecilia Monroe, in the episode).

Alison Sweeney (Sami Brady) appeared on Friends as fictional Days cast member Jessica Ashley (instead of her real-life series character, Sami Brady), Kristian Alfonso as Hope Brady, and Roark Critchlow as Mike Horton. In the Season 9 episode "The One With The Soap Opera Party," in which Joey hosts a "soap opera party" on the roof of his apartment building, Matthew Ashford and Kyle Lowder (who played Jack Deveraux and Brady Black on the soap at the time of the episode) make appearances as his co-stars. In the episode "Joey and the Wrong Name" from the spin-off Joey, Joey receives a soap opera award nomination for "Best Death Scene," after his character is fatally stabbed while performing surgery.

=== Other parodies ===
- The 1980s sketch comedy series SCTV features a recurring soap opera sketch titled "Days of the Week," which includes Martin Short (as Billy McKay), Catherine O'Hara (in the dual roles of Violet McKay and Sue Ellen), Andrea Martin (Mojo). John Candy (as Dr. William Wainright), Eugene Levy (as Dr. Elliott Sabien), Joe Flaherty (as Rocco), Dave Thomas (as Zach Harrington) and Rick Moranis (as Clay Collins).
- Days was parodied as "Light of Our Love", or "LOOL", in the Nancy Drew video game Stay Tuned for Danger.
- The Simpsons features a fictional soap opera, "It Never Ends", in the 2000 episode "Pygmoelian," appearing to be based on Days of Our Lives. Moe Szyslak (voiced by Hank Azaria) is cast in the show after receiving plastic surgery to make himself handsome, only to suffer an accident that returns him to his former appearance after being fired from the show.
- "I Love Kiki," a 1995 episode of the PBS children's series The Puzzle Place, features a parody of the soap titled "The Times of Our Lives".
- Days of Our Mornings is a long-running radio parody, broadcast weekday mornings on 5FM in South Africa.
- "Add a Dad," a 2009 episode of the Nickelodeon animated series The Fairly OddParents, features a parody titled "Dads of Our Lives".
- The 2001 film Legally Blonde features a reference to the show by the main character, Elle Woods (Reese Witherspoon).
- The 2003 Totally Spies! episode "Starstruck" features a television set of a parody show "Days of Our Spies".
- The 2012 House episode "Gut Check" features Dr. House (Hugh Laurie) hiring a kid (Will Shadley) who plays a fictional character of the fictionalized version of the show to pretend to be the long lost son of his colleague at Princeton-Plainsboro Teaching Hospital, James Wilson (Robert Sean Leonard).
- The 2004–2006 sketch comedy series Blue Collar TV features a parody sketch of the show titled "White Trash Days of Our Lives," with the opening sequence slightly changed to "like beer through a redneck, so flows the white trash days of our lives."
- "The Bracebridge Dinner," a 2001 episode of the comedy-drama Gilmore Girls, features a paraphrased reference to the soap's opening sequence by Lorelai Gilmore (Lauren Graham). In said scene, just after Emily goes to walk after her and Richard's fight, Lorelai says, "Like sand through the hourglass, so are the Gilmores of our lives."

== Notable fans ==
Days of Our Lives has had many high-profile fans. In 1976, Time magazine reported that then-Supreme Court Justice Thurgood Marshall would call a recess to court proceedings around the 1:00 p.m. hour to watch the show.

Actress Julia Roberts admitted at the 2002 People's Choice Awards that she was a fan of Days of Our Lives, had asked to be seated near the cast, and upon winning her award stated, "I'm freaking out because the cast of Days of Our Lives is sitting behind me." In 2004, during the show's Melaswen storyline, Roberts' interest was considered notable enough that Entertainment Weekly quoted her saying that "the show has gotten a little wacko."

A 1998 Time article mentioned that Monica Lewinsky was a passionate fan of Days of Our Lives, so much so that she wrote a poem about the series in her high school yearbook. The article compared her whirlwind experiences in the White House to a story on the show.

== Awards and nominations ==
Days of Our Lives won the Daytime Emmy Award for Outstanding Drama Writing Team in June 2012, April 2018, and June 2022. It also won the Daytime Emmy for Outstanding Drama Series in June 2013, April 2015, and April 2018.

== See also ==
- List of soap operas
- List of Days of Our Lives characters
