= List of Days of Our Lives characters introduced in the 2020s =

Days of Our Lives is an American television soap opera that was first broadcast on November 8, 1965. The following is a list of characters that first appear in the show during the 2020s, by order of first appearance. All characters were introduced by show's executive producer, Ken Corday and co-executive producer, Albert Alarr. Greg Meng was subsequently credited as co-executive producer from January to September 2020.

Amanda Raynor (Victoria Platt), an OB/GYN at Salem University hospital is introduced in January 2020 The next character to be introduced is mechanic Jake Lambert (Brandon Barash) in April 2020, when Ben Weston (Robert Scott Wilson) meets him for a job interview. The next character to be introduced is Gwen Rizczech (Emily O'Brien) a mental patient who befriends Claire Brady (Olivia Rose Keegan). In July 2020, Allie Horton (Lindsay Arnold) gives birth to her son Henry (Delaney and Parker Evans). Charlie Dale (Mike Manning) joined the soap in October 2020 as an executive intern to dueling CEOs Philip Kiriakis (Jay Kenneth Johnson) and Xander Kiriakis (Paul Telfer). On Christmas Eve 2020, fraternal twins Jules and Carver Grant were born to Eli Grant (Lamon Archey) and Lani Price (Sal Stowers).

In 2021, Jackée Harry joined the cast as Lani's aunt, Paulina Price. Paulina was soon followed by her daughter, Chanel Dupree. Chanel was briefly played by Precious Way before she was replaced by Raven Bowens. In the summer of 2021, it was announced that Marla Gibbs had been cast as Paulina's mother, Olivia.

== Amanda Raynor ==
Amanda Raynor (commonly known as Doctor Raynor), played by Victoria Platt, is a doctor at Salem University Hospital. The character first appeared on January 23, 2020. While she made her debut in soaps in 1996 on All My Children, Platt is best known to daytime viewers for her portrayal of Vicky Spaulding on Guiding Light. Platt revealed that she was familiar with Days of Our Lives growing up as it was her mom's favorite soap opera. "That was one of the joys being sick when I was a kid: staying home on the couch while my mother watched her stories." The actress was especially excited to work with John Aniston who played Victor Kiriakis. The fast-paced production process was a bit daunting. "There were days that I was completely confused. [...] It was all very quick, but everyone was very supportive." Coincidentally, Platt reported to set at the same time that her husband Terrell Tilford began filming the role of DA Giddens. Platt had no idea what the story was when she took gig. "When I auditioned for the role, it was only for one day." However, Platt was told about the possibility that her role could expand. "I was shocked" Platt said of the "terrible" twist as "Dr. Raynor seemed like a really descent woman." Despite the dark turn, Platt relished in playing the role. "I kind of got to have an emotional experience and really get to know other people in the storyline. That was wonderful." Platt last appeared on April 3, 2020, when the character was written out. The actress reprised the role from January 8 to February 3, 2021.

In flashbacks, Raynor is revealed to be the doctor that delivers Kristen DiMera's (Stacy Haiduk) newborn daughter on Mother's Day 2020. As Kristen panics when she suddenly goes into labor, Raynor does her best to calm the expectant mother. Raynor plans a C-section and successfully delivers Kristen's baby girl. That same day, Raynor tells Xander Kiriakis (Paul Telfer) that his newborn daughter is experiencing complications as she was born shortly after her mother Sarah Horton (Linsey Godfrey) was involved in a car accident. After a thorough examination, Raynor tells Xander that Sarah's baby is dying and there is nothing anyone can do. In March 2020, Raynor runs into Kristen and her boyfriend Brady Black (Eric Martsolf) and they thank her for the condolence card she sent them after their daughter's passing. While she assures them it was the least she could do, Raynor is riddled with guilt as she recalls that Xander offered her a bribe to tell Kristen her baby had died. Raynor then goes to the hospital where she oversees the bone marrow transplant as Gabi Hernandez (Camila Banus) has agreed to donate to help save Sarah's daughter, Mackenzie "Mickey" Horton. After the procedure, Xander orders Raynor to leave town but she refuses as she cares too much for her patients to abandon them. However, Raynor confides in Xander about the guilt she feels upon seeing Mackenzie's real parents – Kristen and Brady. In March 2020, Raynor skips town to avoid questioning about the baby switch. However, Nicole Walker (Arianne Zucker) tracks her down and forces Raynor to confess to confirm that Xander and Victor forced her to switch the babies.

In 2021, Raynor is revealed to be behind the abduction of Eli (Lamon Archey) Lani Grant's (Sal Stowers) newborn twins, Jules and Carver. As she absconds with the babies, Raynor runs into Bonnie Lockhart (Judi Evans). Raynor begrudgingly hands the twins over to Ivan Marais (Ivan G'Vera) as he threatened to turn her in for her involvement in the baby switch. Once he pays her for her services, Raynor warns Ivan that Jules and Carver's detective parents would be hot on their trail. She is later contacted by Xander who reveals that Bonnie identified her to the police who assumed he was involved due to their previous dealings. Xander offers to help Raynor disappear and she agrees to meet with him. However, Eli and Lani turn up to the meeting instead and demand answers. While she doesn't have details on Ivan's identity or location, she assures the worried parents their children are safe. As she fills them in on the details, Raynor takes Eli and Lani to the motel where she took the babies. The only thing Raynor can offer is that Ivan made a phone- call to someone called "Madame."

Platt was nominated for a Daytime Emmy Award for Outstanding Guest Performer in a Drama Series in 2021 but lost to fellow nominee, Cady McClain.

== Jake Lambert ==
Jake Lambert
- Days of Our Lives character
- Portrayed by: Brandon Barash
- Duration: 2020–2023
- First appearance: April 23, 2020
- Last appearance: February 20, 2023
- Created by: Ron Carlivati
- Introduced by: Ken Corday, Albert Alarr and Greg Meng
In-universe information
- Other names: Jake DiMera
- Occupation: Mechanic
- Family: DiMera
- Parents: Stefano DiMera; Vivian Alamain
- Brothers: Stefan DiMera
- Half-brothers: André DiMera; Tony DiMera (legal); Peter Blake (adoptive); Quinn Hudson; Benjy Hawk; EJ DiMera; Chad DiMera
- Half-sisters: Renée DuMonde; Megan Hathaway; Kristen DiMera (adoptive); Lexie Carver
- Grandparents: Santo DiMera
- Uncles: Leopold Alamain; Ryan Brady
- Nieces and nephews: Dimitri Von Leuschner; Theo Carver; Steven Hawk; Johnny DiMera; Sydney DiMera; Grace Brady; Thomas DiMera; Charlotte DiMera; Rachel Black (adoptive); Daniel DiMera
- First cousins: John Black (adoptive); Lawrence Alamain

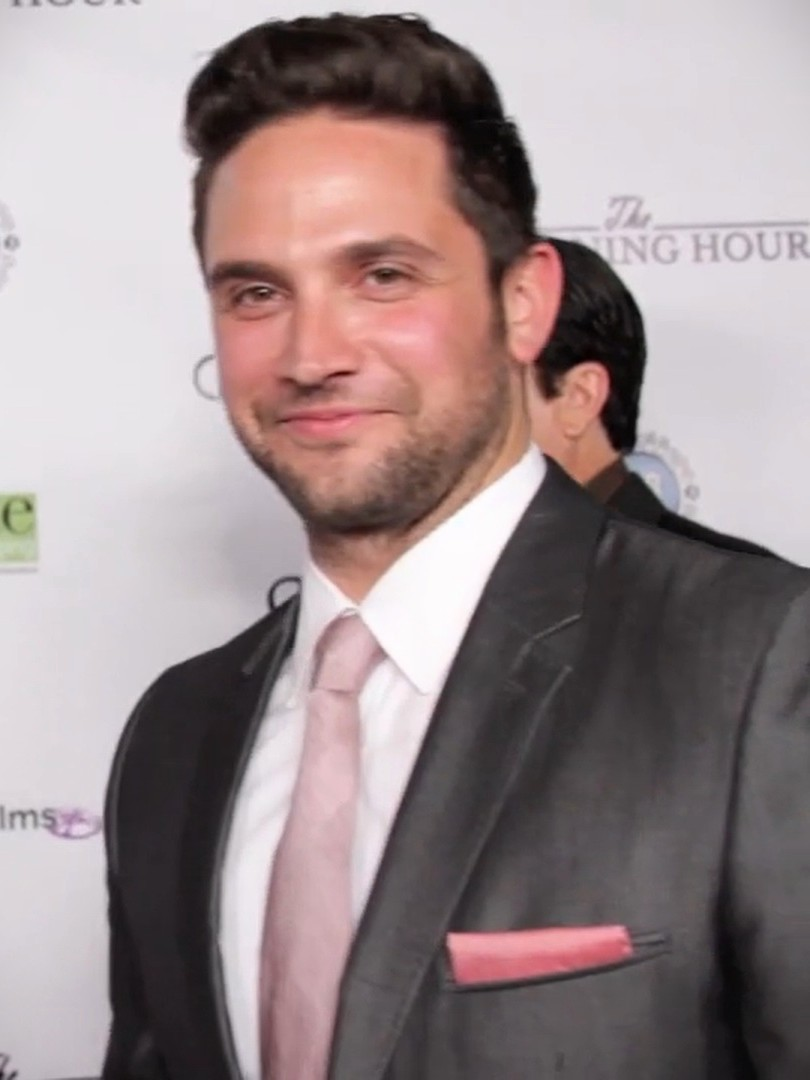
Brandon Barash's introduction as Jake followed his reception in the recast of Stefan DiMera.

Jake Lambert (also DiMera), portrayed by Brandon Barash, is a mechanic who owns a local garage when Ben Weston (Robert Scott Wilson) is job hunting. He first appeared in the episode broadcast on April 23, 2020. Jake was killed off in July 2022 and last appeared on August 2 of that year. He then briefly reappeared on February 20, 2023.

Jake meets with Ben and his girlfriend Ciara Brady (Victoria Konefal) to get Jake to fix Ciara's motorcycle. Ben is also interested in working at the mechanic shop. However, Ben and Ciara are taken aback by Jake's striking resemblance to the late Stefan DiMera (Barash). While the position has already been filled, Jake promises to speak to the owner as he needs more assistance due to a recent surge in business. In town, Jake runs into Stefan's widow, Gabi (Banus) and she faints at the sight of him. Ben inquires about the job again, and Jake agrees to hire Ben if he can take Ciara's bike apart and put it back together. Jake eventually confides in Ben about his ex-girlfriend who constantly caused trouble for him. Jake looks into Stefan and is disgusted to learn he raped Abigail DiMera (Marci Miller). Gabi later accuses him of being Stefan who has faked his death and Jake insist he is not Stefan. However, Gabi is convinced that he is just suffering from amnesia. Gabi later kisses him, but he rejects her.

Shortly after Barash left the series, after his character Stefan was killed off, the actor was spotted in a picture to Galen Gering's social media on November 6, 2019. While the post was quickly deleted, Soaps.com reported that Barash was set to return to the soap. On April 16, 2020, Barash announced on the show's official app that he would return on April 23, 2020.

Candace Young from Soaps She Knows put Jake on her list of the hottest soap opera villains and referred to Jake as "a sexy villainous type" and said that "Whether Stefan or Jake, we’re all in".

== Gwen Rizczech ==
Gwen Rizczech
- Days of Our Lives character
- Portrayed by: Emily O'Brien (2020–present); Linsey Godfrey (2022)
- Duration: 2020–2023, 2025–present
- First appearance: June 5, 2020
- Created by: Ron Carlivati
- Introduced by: Ken Corday, Albert Alarr and Greg Meng (2020); Ken Corday and Janet Spellman-Drucker (2025)
In-universe information
- Other names: Gwendolyn Rizczech; Gwen Von Leuschner; Sarah Horton (2022)
- Occupation: Journalist; Nanny
- Parents: Jack Deveraux; Tiffany Rizczech
- Stepparents: Jennifer Horton
- Siblings: Abigail Deveraux; JJ Deveraux
- Husband: Dimitri Von Leuschner (m. 2023)
- Grandparents: Duke Johnson; Jo Johnson; Harper Deveraux (adoptive); Camille Deveraux (adoptive)
- Aunts and uncles: Steve Johnson; Adrienne Johnson Kiriakis
- Nieces and nephews: Thomas DiMera; Charlotte DiMera
- First cousins: Stephanie Johnson; Joseph Kiriakis (adoptive); Victor Kiriakis II (adoptive); Sonny Kiriakis; Tripp Dalton; Joey Johnson

Gwen Rizczech, played by Emily O'Brien, made her first appearance on June 5, 2020. Gwen befriends Claire during their stay at Bayview Sanatarium and is also the ex-girlfriend of Jake Lambert (Barash).

Speculation about O'Brien's casting start in late 2019 when the actress, best known for her Daytime Emmy Award nominated portrayal of Jana Hawkes on The Young and the Restless, was photographed on set with fellow cast members. The casting and character was officially announced on May 27, 2020. O'Brien stated to Soap Opera Digest "It was for the best because this role feels good. It feels like a puzzle piece." She later said "getting to play somebody" like Gwen "feels extremely comfortable for reasons that I don't know." "When this opportunity came, it was serendipitous. I wasn't used to it. It's a great opportunity and a really wonderful role that I'm enjoying." O'Brien was flattered to learn from executive producer Albert Alarr that Days had been working to get her onto the show for quite some time. In 2018, O'Brien auditioned for the role of Sarah Horton on three separate occasions. She even screen-tested with Greg Vaughan, who would play Sarah's love interest, Eric Brady. However, Godfrey was ultimately cast as Sarah. A year later, the actress was invited to audition for another role. "I remember going in and it was very ominous in the room" she said. Alarr and casting director Marnie Saitta informed O'Brien that she would not be playing the role she just had auditioned for, "'but there's a new role we want to mold around you.' That's when the character of Gwen was born."

Ron Carlivati described Gwen as "mischievous." "Gwen is so colorful" O'Brien said of the role upon her casting. The actress further described Gwen as "wonderfully unpredictable and volatile and she's completely fearless. She lives on the edge and with complete passion." Later that year, O'Brien referred to Gwen as "raw and scruffy." She continued, that Gwen is a "misanthrope who doesn't really fit in very well." Gwen is an "outcast." Gwen is "different" and "much more dangerous. [―] She doesn't look or behave, like most of the people in town."

From January 19–24, 2022, Linsey Godfrey portrayed the role when Gwen masqueraded as Sarah Horton, who Godfrey portrays.

She arrives in Salem, to get revenge on Jack Deveraux for "abandoning" her as a child and favoring Abigail. When it's revealed that Jack didn't about know about Gwen's existence due to Laura Horton's intervening, Gwen tries mend her ways to have a positive relationship with him but remained at odds with Abigail. Eventually, Gwen causes too much trouble for Jack to keep her in his life and severs ties with her. In retaliation, she and Xander Cook blackmail him and Jennifer out of The Spectator, a newspaper the run, in exchange for keeping quiet about Jennifer's drug relapse and running Gwen over while high on pills. She later gets tangled in Dimitri von Leuschner's plan to gain his family's inheritance by marrying her. She learns however, that he is attracted to her best friend Leo Stark and was using her. She steals one of his checks and following Dimitri's arrest for attempted murder on Gabi and Stefan, she leaves Salem to collect the rest of the fortune and get away from the pain it caused her. Later, she gives Chad her share of The Spectator in exchange for money.

Charlie Mason and Richard Simms from Soaps She Knows praised the scenes where Gwen revealed her paternity, calling it the "Best Reveal" in 2021 of American soap operas, writing, "We all knew that Days of Our Lives' Gwen was going to turn out to be Jack's daughter. The writing was not only on the wall, it was in a huge-ass font. But that did nothing diminish the impact of Emily O'Brien's beautiful performance in the scenes in which she called out Daddy Dearest for, as she put it, knocking up her mum and waltzing away." In 2024, O'Brien was shortlisted for the Daytime Emmy Award for Outstanding Supporting Actress in a Drama Series for her role as Gwen.

== Henry Horton ==
Henry Horton
- Days of Our Lives character
- Portrayed by: Delaney & Parker Evans (2020); Jayna and Kinsley Fox (2020–2021); Nash and Clyde Gunderson (2021–2022)
- Duration: 2020–2022
- First appearance: July 31, 2020
- Last appearance: November 15, 2022
- Created by: Ron Carlivati
- Introduced by: Ken Corday and Albert Alarr
In-universe information
- Other names: Henry Lucas Horton
- Father: Charlie Dale
- Mother: Allie Horton
- Grandfathers: Jimmy Giacomo; Lucas Horton
- Grandmothers: Ava Vitali; Sami Brady
- Uncles: Tripp Dalton; Will Horton; Johnny DiMera
- Aunts: Sydney DiMera
- First cousins: Arianna Horton; Trey DiMera (adoptive); Olivia DiMera

Henry Horton, the son of Allie Horton (Lindsay Arnold), was introduced on July 31, 2020. The role was originated by Delaney and Parker Evans, and later played by Jayna and Kinsley Fox.

When Allie returns to Salem in 2020, she moves in with her uncle Eric Brady (Vaughn) and his wife Nicole (Zucker) and reveals she is secretly pregnant. Allie plans to put her baby up for adoption and turns to her former stepfather Rafe Hernandez (Gering) to raise her baby. However, Allie's mother Sami Brady (Alison Sweeney) soon arrives and tries to talk her daughter out of giving away her baby. Allie goes into labor during an argument with Sami and gives birth to her son. Allie names her son Henry and gives him the middle name Lucas, after her father Lucas Horton (Bryan Dattilo). However, not long after she gives birth, Allie skips town and leaves a note telling her family she wants Eric and Nicole to raise her baby which infuriates Sami. When Sami is set to leave town with Henry, Allie returns and Sami agrees to leave the baby with Allie, Eric and Nicole. Allie is horrified when she runs into the man she believes is her baby's father, Tripp Dalton (Lucas Adams). Allie accuses Tripp of rape, but Tripp vehemently denies it. It was later revealed in January 2021 that Henry's biological father was Charlie Dale, the maternal half-brother to Tripp Dalton (Lucas Adams), and the youngest child of Ava Vitali (Tamara Braun).

== Charlie Dale ==
Charlie Dale
- Days of Our Lives character
- Portrayed by: Mike Manning
- Duration: 2020–2022
- First appearance: October 6, 2020
- Last appearance: May 16, 2022
- Created by: Ron Carlivati
- Introduced by: Ken Corday and Albert Alarr
In-universe information
- Occupation: Executive intern
- Parents: Jimmy Giacomo; Ava Vitali
- Half-brothers: Tripp Dalton
- Sons: Henry Horton
- Grandfathers: Martino Vitali

Charlie Dale, played by Mike Manning, made his first appearance on October 6, 2020. Charlie is introduced as an intern at Titan Industries.

Charlie's shirt is ruined when juice spills on him after a confrontation between his bosses Xander and Philip Kiriakis. Xander gives Charlie money to replace his shirt and the drinks, but on his way back to the office, Charlie collides with Claire (Isabel Durant), spilling the drinks on his new shirt. Claire apologizes and Charlie ask her on a date. Claire warns him to be careful working at Titan. Charlie comforts Claire as she grieves the loss the death of her aunt Ciara (Konefal) and as she struggles with the news that her ex-boyfriend Tripp (Adams) has been accused of rape. However, Charlie is dejected when he spies Claire kissing another ex-boyfriend, Theo Carver (Cameron Johnson). After Claire's friend Jan Spears (Heather Lindell), makes him listen, Claire explains that it was a mistake and that Theo is in her past and Charlie agrees to accompany her to her parents' wedding. He is later recruited by both Philip and Xander to spy on the other, and when Xander learns that the truth, he promises Charlie a promotion if he continues working against Philip. After his second date with Claire, Charlie is summoned by his estranged mother – Ava Vitali (Tamara Braun). Ava informs Charlie that his brother Tripp was accused of raping Allie (Arnold) and despite multiple DNA tests, she knows he is innocent. Ava forces Charlie him to admit that he raped Allie and fathered her baby when Ava enlisted him to keep an eye on Tripp in London. Though the charges have been dropped, Ava wants Charlie to come forward to restore Tripp's reputation. A bitter Charlie knocks Ava out and takes her prisoner furious at her for her rejection while she loves Tripp unconditionally. Charlie leaves Ava tied up at his apartment as he accompanies Claire to her grandparents' house for Christmas. Charlie is stunned when Claire introduces him to her to Allie and makes a quick excuse to leave.

Manning announced his casting on social media on September 29, 2020. Manning had auditioned for casting director Marnie Saitta multiple times dating back to 2013. This time, "it was just a case of the right fit, the right role at the right time." Manning was familiar with a few of the cast members including Mary Beth Evans and Brandon Beemer as he worked opposite the actors on The Bay, and Adams who is a friend, all of whom warned Manning about the taping speed. "The role has become so much more complex than I originally realized in the audition process" Manning said to Soap Opera Digest. He continued, "The more I find out about Charlie, the more excited I am about him..."

== Jules and Carver Grant ==
Jules and Carver Grant
- Days of Our Lives character
- Portrayed by: Arya and Wynter Wells (2021–2022); Veda and Bali Singh (2021–2022)
- Duration: 2020–2022
- First appearance: December 24, 2020
- Last appearance: July 1, 2022
- Created by: Ron Carlivati
- Introduced by: Ken Corday and Albert Alarr
In-universe information
- Other names: Julia Harriet Grant; Stefania Alamain; Carver Malcolm Grant; Jacob Alamain
- Father: Eli Grant
- Mother: Lani Price
- Brothers: David Grant
- Grandfathers: David Banning; TR Coates; Abe Carver (adoptive)
- Grandmothers: Valerie Grant; Paulina Price; Tamara Price (adoptive)
- Uncles: Scotty Banning; Brandon Walker (adoptive); Theo Carver (adoptive)
- Aunts: Chanel Dupree
- Other relatives: Julie Olson Williams; Olivia Price; Tamara Price; Trey DiMera (Adoptive)

Jules Grant and Carver Grant are the fraternal twins of Eli (Archey) and Lani (Stowers).

On Christmas Eve, Lani goes into labor during the Horton Christmas party and she gives birth with Eli by her side. After careful deliberation, Eli and Lani name their babies – Julia Harriet and Carver Malcolm – after Eli's grandmother Julie Williams (Susan Seaforth Hayes) and Lani's father Abe Carver (James Reynolds). Just as the twins are discharged from the hospital, Eli and Lani discover the babies have been abducted from the nursery. Their captor Amanda Raynor (Platt) runs into Bonnie Lockhart (Evans) and assumes the babies are her own. Bonnie helps comfort Carver when he cries before Raynor departs with the twins. Raynor then turns the twins over to Ivan Marais (G'Vera). Ivan delivers the twins to the presumed dead Vivian Alamain (Linda Dano). Ivan offers the twins to makeup for his role in depriving Vivian of her own twins, Stefan and Jake (Barash). Vivian even gives the twins new names, with Jules being called Stefania, and Carver being called Jacob, after her own sons. However, Eli and Lani track Vivian and Ivan down and rescue the twins just in time to celebrate their first Valentine's Day as a family. In March 2021, the twins are christened with Abe and Eli's mother Valerie Grant (Vanessa A. Williams) as Carver's godparents, while Julie and Lani's brother Theo (Cameron Johnson) serve as Jules's godparents.

At the time of the births, like most of the world, the country is dealing with the COVID-19 pandemic, and babies were not allowed on set. Stowers praised the producers and said "They have actually done really well with getting custom babies. These babies look very real, from their eyelashes and noses down to their skin color." The show also had dolls to use as the twins got older that mimicked breathing. According to Archey, their names are "special." He continued, "They have weight" to them. Archey described fatherhood as "uncharted territory" for Eli. Carlivati said "the new year does not get off a good start for Eli and Lani when they realize their babies have been kidnapped." However, "this is not just two parents but two cops, and they're determined" to uncover the truth. Eli and Lani "go into overdrive as they and solve the unfolding mystery." In addition, Jules and Carver's birth makes way for the introduction of a new character, Paulina (Jackée Harry). Paulina is Lani's great aunt and has hopes of being the twins' godmother. Johnson's return as Theo also ties into the twins' christening.

Legacy names (2021)

The look of pride on Abe's face when they told him his grandson's name was Carver was perfect. And while I never pull punches when it comes to Julie, Susan Seaforth Hayes is a legend, and I love it when DAYS names kids after characters who've earned their legacy on the show.

— Laurisa, Soapcentral.com

The revelation that Lani and Eli were having twins was well received. TV Source Magazine's Jenna Kaylor was especially happy with the twist. "My babies are having twins!!! [...] I was excited when I found out about the twins, is putting it mildly." TV Fanatic's Christine Orlando said "I love this twist because it's a happy one, and these two deserve some more joy in their lives." Laurisa from Soapcentral.com loved the humor in Eli's reaction to the news. The writer also said "I'm so glad the babies Elani are safe! Let's keep it that way!" In December 2020, Janet Di Lauro ranked the story at number 7 on Soap Hub's list of the Top 10 Reasons to Watch. While he felt it was "silly" the parents didn't already have names picked out, Jack Ori was more critical of the writing which likened the Christmas births two the birth of baby Jesus, in the Christian religion. "I'm not even Christian, but I found the idea that Lani's twins being born on Christmas and/or her feeling her late baby son's presence during the birth was analogous to the birth of Christ to be mildly offensive." Soap Opera Digest praised the "sweet scenes" and appreciated the "nod to history" as it acknowledged Julie's given name. Richard Simms said it "sweet" that the twins were named for Abe and Julie. Ori said "Finally" when the characters were given names and said scenes provided the "warm family" moments the show had been lacking. Ori felt it was a "nice gesture" to use Abe's last name instead due to their oldest son being named after the character. TV Fanatic's Round Table unanimously agreed that their names were good. Stephanie described naming the twins after family members as "predictable" but agreed it maintained the show's tradition of naming children. "It's also nice that each middle name is also the name of an influential black person like Malcolm X and Harriet Tubman." Ori observed that it was "the first time I can think of a soap with an African American couple ever referencing Black history and culture." Kathy appreciated the nickname for Jules, to differentiate from her great-grandmother. Orlando said the names "are the perfect mix of honoring their family and their culture. I think Days got this one right." Though "annoyed" at how long it took for the babies to be named, Laurisa said "the names and scenes were worth the wait!" Ori and Andy weren't fans of the kidnapping plot. Andy described it as "overdone" but appreciated that the "motives behind it makes sense, and it's given Lani and Eli some better material to work with." Simms felt that other than causing drama, "the whole thing seemed to serve no overall purpose." According to Ori, "this story built up to a fever pitch for absolutely nothing" as the "climax of this story happened off-screen! That's bad writing, not to mention that the entire thing felt pointless."

== Paulina Price ==
Paulina Price
- Days of Our Lives character
- Portrayed by: Jackée Harry
- Duration: 2021–present
- First appearance: March 1, 2021
- Created by: Ron Carlivati
- Introduced by: Ken Corday and Albert Alarr
- Spin-off appearances: Days of Our Lives: Beyond Salem (2021); Days of Our Lives: A Very Salem Christmas (2021)
In-universe information
- Occupation: Mayor
- Mother: Olivia Price
- Sisters: Tamara Price
- Husband: George Dupree (widowed); Abe Carver (2022–present)
- Daughters: Lani Price; Chanel Dupree
- Stepsons: Brandon Walker; Theo Carver
- Grandchildren: David Grant; Carver Grant; Jules Grant; Trey DiMera (adoptive); Olivia DiMera

Paulina Price, played by Jackée Harry, is introduced as the aunt of Lani Price (Stowers) on March 1, 2021.

Paulina arrives in Salem to visit her niece Lani who has recently welcomed newborn twins, Jules and Carver. Paulina is happy to meet Lani's husband Eli Grant (Archey) and her father Abe Carver (Reynolds). Paulina convinces Abe to introduce her to a local landlord who is looking to lease his storefront property in the town square which upsets Kate DiMera (Lauren Koslow). Paulina is determined to open the door for more minority owned businesses in town. As Paulina gets acquainted with Salem, she befriends Eli's mother Valerie Grant (Williams) while she clashes with Eli's grandmother Julie Olson Williams (Seaforth Hayes) when she appoints herself as Jules's godmother over Julie. Ultimately, Valerie must break it to Paulina that Julie is the godmother. Though disappointed, she understands but next Paulina must contend with her daughter Chanel's (Precious Way) sudden arrival as she causes trouble for Claire Brady (Durant) and Tripp Dalton (Adams). Paulina gives Chanel a reality check when she cuts her off and orders her to get a job. Meanwhile, Paulina gets close to Abe as she pitches a development project for the town square but needs Abe's help to move forward due to zoning laws. Paulina is irate to learn Chanel has married troubled Xander Kiriakis (Telfer) for his money. After Abe fills her in on Xander's extensive criminal history, she enlist Lani's help in convincing Chanel to divorce Xander. Paulina is speechless when Lani reveals that Xander will only divorce Chanel in exchange for $10 million. Paulina meets with Chanel and Xander, but instead of giving into his demands, she offers Xander $100,000 which upsets Chanel as she and Xander planned to split the millions. A furious Paulina destroys the check leaving Chanel to figure it out on her own. Paulina then says her goodbyes as she plans a brief return to Miami in order to make Salem her new home. Before she leaves, Paulina shares a secret with Jules and Carver.

It's soon revealed that her true project was to demolish the square and put up a superstore called "Pricetown." She is found out and Abe, who formed a relationship with her, is hurt and humiliated. Lani and Eli's family is angry as well. Guilt-ridden, she calls of her project and attempts to make amends with everyone, however, her mother Olivia Price (Marla Gibbs) arrives to ensure she stays away from Lani. It's revealed that Paulina is Lani's mother and her father was a man who abused Paulina. Olivia had Paulina give the baby to her sister, Tamera, to protect her and made Paulina promise to her sister that she'd maintain her distance from Lani.

In January 2020, on Twitter, Carlivati asked Harry when her iconic 227 character, Sandra Clark, would come to Salem? Harry admitted that she was interested. While he saw it as playful banter, Carlivati was definitely interested. "I'm a huge fan of hers so I was like 'When are we bringing Jackée to the show?'" A year later, a storyline set to launch in early 2021 created the perfect opportunity for the writer so he presented the idea to executive producers Ken Corday and Albert Alarr. Carlivati told Soap Opera Digest, "I didn't know where it would go" or if Harry was truly interested, "but luckily for us, she starts taping very soon and we're very happy about that." While Harry was initially worried that she had been "typecast again... As soon as they said she would have money, I said yes." On December 8, 2020, during an appearance on NBC's Today, Harry announced that she would soon join the cast of Days of Our Lives. Harry said "It's a brand-new storyline with African Americans." It was later reported that the character was called "Paulina" and Harry was slated to debut in March 2021. Stephanie Chase reported that Harry was set to begin taping in December 2020. After the serial was picked up for two more seasons in 2021, Harry was upped to regular status, according to Deadline Hollywood.

Charlie Mason and Richard Simms from Soaps She Knows named Paulina as the "Best New Character" of 2021 in American soap operas, writing, "We were psyched to begin with when Days of Our Lives announced that Jackée Harry was joining the cast. But then we met the glamtastic Paulina, she started letting drop her truth bombs, and we couldn't have agreed more with her assessment of Salem: "This town needs me."" In 2024, Mason included Paulina in his list of the worst mothers in American soap operas, explaining, "Some foresight would have been nice. Nonetheless, Lani and Chanel DuPree's mother is the sort who would set off in a snowstorm — while radioactive, no less — to make sure that not a single one of her girls was turned into an exceptionally feisty popsicle."

== Chanel Dupree ==
Chanel Dupree
- Days of Our Lives character
- Portrayed by: Precious Way (2021); Raven Bowens (2021–present)
- Duration: 2021–present
- First appearance: March 25, 2021
- Created by: Ron Carlivati
- Introduced by: Ken Corday and Albert Alarr
- Spin-off appearances: Days of Our Lives: A Very Salem Christmas (2021)
In-universe information
- Other names: Chanel Kiriakis; Chanel DiMera
- Occupation: Baker
- Parents: George Dupree; Paulina Price
- Stepfather: Abe Carver
- Half-sisters: Lani Price
- Husband: Xander Kiriakis (2021); Johnny DiMera (2021–2022, 2024–present)
- Sons: Trey DiMera (adoptive)
- Daughters: Olivia DiMera
- Grandparents: Olivia Price
- Aunts: Tamara Price
- Nephews: David Grant; Carver Grant
- Nieces: Jules Grant

Chanel Dupree was introduced on March 25, 2021, as the daughter of Paulina Price (Harry). The role was originated by Precious Way. Less than four months after her debut, Way vacated the role on July 5, and was replaced by Raven Bowens on July 6. On January 13, 2026, it was announced Bowens had been let go from the role.

Chanel arrives in Salem and immediately befriends Claire Brady (Durant) and Tripp Dalton (Adams). However, things turn sour when Chanel tries to stick them with her bill at the town square. Before she can escape, Chanel runs into Paulina and Lani, after she tries to run away from Lani's cop husband Eli Grant (Lamon Archey). Chanel confronts her mother about freezing her credit cards and Paulina informs Chanel that she has to get a job. Chanel then runs into her ex-boyfriend Theo Carver (Cameron Johnson). Though she is happy to see him and wants to catch up, Theo rushes off. Theo ultimately rejects Chanel when he realizes that she's only interested in reuniting because her mom has cut her off. Chanel then bonds with Xander Kiriakis (Telfer) who is mourning his broken engagement. Assuming Xander is the CEO of Titan Industries, Chanel marries Xander assuming she has hit the jackpot. Chanel is horrified to discover Xander is actually broke and plans to end the marriage when Xander convinces her that he'll only agree to divorce if Paulina pays him off. Chanel only agrees when Xander suggest they split the payout evenly. Chanel informs Lani that Xander will only agree to divorce in exchange for $10 million.

The character was first announced in December 2020, when Harry announced her own casting. On February 2, 2021, Blackfilm.com announced the Way was cast as Chanel. Chanel marked Way's very first acting role. The show's official Twitter account said "Get ready, Salem. A new family is arriving." Way was slated to debut in late March 2021. Chanel made her debut on March 25, 2021. In an interview with Soap Opera Digest expressed her excitement during the audition process. "Everything's been so crazy with Covid, and I put up a self-tape audition and I had so much doing it because I really loved the scene and I felt very free." Due to the COVID-19 pandemic, the audition was one of Way's first chances "to get dressed up, so I went all out for my tape! I put on sparkly dress, and it gave me an excuse to put on some makeup and feel cute." With a friend's help, Way recording her audition and sent it to the casting department. After a few more auditions, Way finally booked the role. Way also revealed that her late grandmother loved "her stories." While she was too young to remember which soap her grandmother watched, when she booked the role, Way said "This is a special thing from me to her." Before she told anyone about the casting, Way's sister told her that Days of Our Lives was their grandmother's favorite soap and then emotionally shared the news. "How does that even happen? How does it work out like that?"

== Olivia Price ==
Olivia Price
- Days of Our Lives character
- Portrayed by: Marla Gibbs
- Duration: 2021–present
- First appearance: August 16, 2021
- Created by: Ron Carlivati
- Introduced by: Ken Corday and Albert Alarr
In-universe information
- Daughters: Tamara Price; Paulina Price
- Granddaughters: Lani Price-Grant; Chanel Dupree
- Other relatives: David Grant; Jules Grant; Carver Grant; Trey DiMera (adoptive); Olivia DiMera

Olivia Price, played by Gibbs, debuted on August 16, 2021. Olivia is the mother of Pauline Price, played by Gibbs's 227 co-star Harry.

Olivia comes to town, and orders Paulina out of Salem and away from Lani, on behalf of her daughter Tamara. Paulina wants to tell Lani that she is her real mother but Olivia convinces her to keep quiet. Meanwhile, Olivia makes her disapproval about Paulina's budding romance with Tamara's ex-boyfriend, Abe Carver (James Reynolds) known. After meeting Lani's husband Eli Grant (Lamon Archey) and their twins Jules and Carver, Olivia goes back to Miami. In November 2021, Eli escorts Olivia to Paulina and Abe's wedding. Olivia is not a fan of Tamara's former roommate Marlena Evans (Deidre Hall) officiating the wedding. When Paulina's daughter Chanel Dupree (Raven Bowens) interrupts the wedding to reveal that Paulina is Lani's mother, Paulina accuses Chanel of lying forcing Olivia to intervene and confirm the story. To make things more awkward, Lani invites Olivia to spend Thanksgiving with her but excludes Paulina.

Gibbs actually announced the casting herself during an interview with the New York Daily News as she was inducted into the Hollywood Walk of Fame on July 20, 2021. Soap Opera Digest officially confirmed the casting and character on July 22. "Get excited...," Carlivati said on social media. Monsters and Critics's Rachelle Lewis revealed the role "will showcase her comedic talent."

Daytime Confidential's Carly Silver said "Legends are reuniting on Days of Our Lives!" Amy Mistretta from Soaps She Knows wrote that "Things in Salem are about to be 'movin’ on up!'" "Classic television fans are going to go wild" Kambra Clifford said of the news. Chris Eades of Soaps In Depth said "Another very familiar face is coming to Salem as Marla Gibbs has been cast on DAYS OF OUR LIVES as Olivia Price!" TV Insider's Paige Strout said "viewers are in for a treat" and that Gibbs and Harry's onscreen "reunion will certainly be a must-watch event." Strout felt it would provide "an exciting new storyline" as viewers did not know much about Paulina's mother. Lewis described Olivia as "a vital addition to several storylines" as the Price family's matriarch." Jordan Simon and Jamila Lizete White agreed it would special for 227 fans.

== Dimitri Von Leuschner ==
Dimitri Von Leuschner
- Days of Our Lives: Beyond Salem character
- Portrayed by: Peter Porte
- Duration: 2021; 2023; 2026
- First appearance: September 7, 2021
- Created by: Ron Carlivati
- Introduced by: Albert Alarr and Ken Corday; Ken Corday and Janet Spellman-Drucker (2026)
- Spin-off appearances: Days of Our Lives: Beyond Salem
In-universe information
- Other names: Kyle Graham
- Family: DiMera
- Father: Oskar Von Leuschner
- Mother: Megan Hathaway
- Wife: Gwen Rizczech (m. 2023–2026)
- Grandfathers: Stefano DiMera
- Uncles: Henri Von Leuschner; André DiMera; Tony DiMera (legal); Peter Blake (adoptive); Benjy Hawk; EJ DiMera; Stefan DiMera; Jake Lambert; Chad DiMera
- Aunts: Kristen DiMera (adoptive); Renée DuMonde; Lexie Carver
- First cousins: Frankie Brady Carly Manning; Theo Carver; Steven Hawk; Johnny DiMera; Sydney DiMera; Rachel Black (adoptive); Thomas DiMera; Charlotte DiMera
- Other relatives: Nicholas Alamain; Melanie Jonas

Dimitri Von Leuschner is a character from in the Days of Our Lives spinoff series Beyond Salem and portrayed by Peter Porte. Porte reprised the character as a main character on the parent show as of May 8, 2023. He is the only son of Megan Hathaway, the oldest grandchild of Stefano DiMera, and also the cousin of Carly Manning and Frankie Brady. Porte exited the role on December 12, 2023, when Dimitri is transferred to a "supermax" prison. In November 2025, it was revealed Dimitri would return to Salem, with Porte reprising the role. Dmitri returned during the final moments of the January 2, 2026, episode.

Dmitri is introduced as having posed as an ISA agent to retrieve a family heirloom that was used as a dowry for Carly's first marriage to Lawrence Alamain, the Alamainian Peacock. Working with Drew Donovan, who modified it to connect satellite lasers that could destroy entire cities, his plans were foiled by John, Marlena, and Billie Reed with whom he flirted with. The two men were arrested and sent to prison in Alamainia.

Escaping prison with a lookalike in his place and helping his mother with her plans involving Bo Brady loving her again. Dimitri kidnaps Kate, who escaped Megan's compound to be used as leverage to grant him and his mother immunity for their crimes. Kate is rescued but Dimitri also had Andrew Donovan, Shane's son, captured as well just in case. They are both released from custody and granted immunity along with his aunt, Kristen, who stumbled on the plot and forced Megan to make her part of the deal. He eventually arrives in Salem where Megan reveals he has to marry before he turns 40 in order to receive an inheritance from his father's family, which includes conditions of one year of marriage and not under false pretense. While Megan initially settled for Kristen to marry him, this disgusted him and Kristen. Finding Gwen Rizczech as a better alternative, he begins to romance her. However, his true orientation is revealed when he develops feelings for Leo Stark which eventually blows ups his marriage to Gwen and his inheritance.

After attempting to kill Stefan and Gabi for trying to blackmail him, he is shot by Vivian Alamain but survives. He escapes the hospital with Leo's help but the two, during another escape attempt, run Nicole Walker off the road and deliver her baby boy. Dimitri attempts to get him to the hospital but panics upon seeing the police. He instead gives the baby to Sloan Petersen and Melinda Trask in exchange for a deal. He learns that Sloan faked the baby's death and kept it as hers and Eric's adopted son. He blackmails her into getting Leo out of prison but she, in turn, convinces him to turn himself in to ensure Leo is freed on a deal. Melinda later has him transferred to a federal prison far from Salem to ensure he can't tell the truth about Sloan's crimes, but not before telling Leo about Nicole's baby being alive and with Sloan and Eric. Off-screen, he is eventually released and sends Leo a farewell letter, wishing him well and hoping he'll find someone else to love.

Whilst reviewing the year, Charlie Mason and Richard Simms from Soaps She Knows called Dimitri the "Most Consistent" character of American soap operas in 2023, explaining that whilst soap operas often "deal a lot with the redemptive power of love", Dimitri remained a "demented sociopath" without any "qualms" over his actions despite having found "Mr. Right" through his relationship with Leo.

== TR Coates ==
TR Coates
- Days of Our Lives character
- Portrayed by: William Christian
- Duration: 2022
- First appearance: January 26, 2022
- Last appearance: June 22, 2022
- Created by: Ron Carlivati
- Introduced by: Albert Alarr and Ken Corday
In-universe information
- Other names: Terrell Raymond Coates; Ray Coates
- Occupation: Film producer
- Daughters: Lani Price Grant
- Grandsons: David Grant; Carver Grant
- Granddaughters: Jules Grant

TR Coates (also known as Ray), played by William Christian, is the biological father of Lani Price (Stowers) and ex-boyfriend of Paulina Price (Harry). Christian first appeared in the episode broadcast on January 26, 2022.

TR arrives in Salem demanding that Johnny honor their contract and continue production on the movie about the demonic possession of his grandmother, Marlena Evans (Deidre Hall). However, Johnny reveals that he abandoned the project after Marlena's most recent possession. Excited by the possibility of a sequels, TR convinces Johnny to go against his family's wishes, move forward with the movie and blame everything on him. TR runs into his ex-girlfriend Paulina who wants nothing to do with him as he abused her in the past. However, TR apologizes, insisting he's a changed man, having made a career for himself in film making. Paulina does not approve of his dealings with Johnny, the man who just dumped her daughter. Paulina is cagey when TR ask about her daughter and even Lani – who Paulina claims is her niece – interrupts them. Having looked her up online, TR's suspicions about Lani are confirmed by Paulina's other daughter, Chanel Dupree (Raven Bowens) who claims Lani as her sister. TR makes a beeline for Lani but she rejects him. However, he vows to be a part of Lani's life.

Soon, it is soon revealed that he had not changed. He still used drugs, abused women, and was only after Paulina for her money. After Paulina discovers he had attacked Abe, she renounces him. Before he could lay a hand on her, however, Lani arrives and shoots him dead. After Lani killed him, she began seeing his ghost until she turned herself in as his murderer.

The character was announced on January 18, 2022, by Soaps.com. Soap Opera Digest later announced Christian's casting. Christian, best known for his Daytime Emmy Award nominated role as Derek Frye on All My Children, had a four episode guest stint in 2018. Christian was contacted by co-executive producer Albert Alarr, his friend of 30+ years, about the role. However, Christian was hesitant to take the role as he had recently relocated to Boston with his family. Ultimately, it was his family's encouragement that convinced Christian to take the gig. Commuting for work was something Christian became accustomed to during his tenure on All My Children as he resided in Los Angeles, and filmed in New York.

== Bo Weston ==
Bo Weston is the son of Ben Weston and Ciara Brady

Bo Weston
- Days of Our Lives character
- Portrayed by: Cody and Warren Kransnow (2022) Vinc Vincent Simard (2025-present)
- Duration: 2022-2025-present
- First appearance: May 6, 2022
- Created by: Ron Carlivati
- Introduced by: Ken Corday and Albert Alarr
- Spin-off appearances: Days of Our Lives: Beyond Salem (2022)
In-universe information
- Other names: Beauregard Brady Weston; Bo Brady (his first name is after his maternal grandfather); Brady family (his middle name is after Ciara maiden last name and her adoptive family Brady)
- Father: Ben Weston
- Mother: Ciara Brady
- Siblings: Addie Weston
- Grandfathers: Clyde Weston; Bo Brady
- Grandmothers: Mrs. Weston; Hope Williams Brady
- Uncles: Shawn-Douglas Brady; Zack Brady
- Aunts: Jordan Ridgeway; Chelsea Brady
- First cousins: David Ridgeway; Isaac Brady; Claire Brady

Bo Weston is born on May 6, 2023 (due to the Time Jump (2019-2020)) to parents Ben and Ciara Weston and Ciara had help from Allie as the possessed devil with the delivery.

After Bo was born, he was taken by Allie when she was possessed by the Devil and Ciara was distraught as Allie walks out of the cabin with her son and unfortunately Ben was too late as he found Ciara already given birth to their son in the cabin thanks to Susan Banks psychic abilities and Johnny DiMera helps they finally found out Allie's possession and where they were hiding. Unfortunately, Ben and Ciara son was already taken leaving them to both heartbroken for their child.

Allie had summoned Evan Frears to go to the hospital where Ciara and Ben had been checked out after she gave birth and sneaks into Ciara's room. He tries to kill her, but is stopped by Ben and Shawn. They discharged from the hospital and learn Allie is at the cemetery with their son after Susan, Johnny and Marlena Evans summoned Bo Brady to help Ciara and find him. However, Allie summoned Charlie Dale to protect her and he knocks Ben out. Ciara, with help from her father, stops the ritual and the Devil is forced to flee. Tripp arrives and sends Charlie back to Hell with a shovel to the head. The couple are finally reunited with their son whom they name Bo Brady Weston at the hospital with Kayla Brady there to witness it.

Shawn and Belle show up at the hospital to see Ciara and Ben happily reunited with their son and Shawn hold his nephew Bo was Belle starts bring up memories of their daughter Claire Brady when she was baby and Shawn said he will teach his nephew Bo all about his grandfather some day and after they left Bo shows up again see Ciara holding her son Bo and Ben along Ciara thanks Bo for his helping them find their son and he look at his grandson one last time before leaving.

== Wendy Shin ==
Wendy Shin
- Days of Our Lives character
- Portrayed by: Victoria Grace
- Duration: 2022–2024
- First appearance: July 11, 2022
- Last appearance: April 29, 2024
- Created by: Ron Carlivati
- Introduced by: Ken Corday and Albert Alarr
- Spin-off appearances: Days of Our Lives: Beyond Salem (2022)
In-universe information
- Occupation: IT Specialist
- Family: Shin
- Father: Wei Shin
- Mother: Mrs. Shin
- Brothers: Li Shin
- Uncles: Li Jun

Jing-Wen "Wendy" Shin is portrayed by Victoria Grace. She first appeared in the second season of Days of Our Lives: Beyond Salem in 2022 before reappearing on the main soap later that year.

Wendy is the daughter of Wei Shin and younger sister of Li Shin, who works in IT for DiMera Enterprises pharmaceutical division in Alaska. She tries to show up her brother by locating one of the three prisms. While searching for Harris Michaels, she breaks into the apartment shared by Tripp Johnson, Joey Johnson and Stephanie Johnson. She is apprehended and questioned by the two brothers, who recognize Harris as the man who delivered their pizza. They team up and travel to Hong Kong, where a gala to present the prisms are held. She and the boys help apprehend a brainwashed Steve Johnson and John Black. She is rewarded with a promotion at her old job.

She appears in Days of Our Lives a few months later searching for Li to ask for a transfer to the main office in Salem. He eventually agrees with EJ DiMera's approval. However, she notices how shaky his relationship with Gabi Hernandez is. Johnny DiMera shares his thoughts on how Stefan DiMera has changed so drastically and the two team up to find out what happened. Johnny and Wendy develop an attraction to each other. However, she soon falls in love with Tripp Johnson and chooses him over Johnny when she realizes that he still has feelings for Chanel. They both become entangled with Clyde Weston's drug ring when his henchwoman, Rebecca Goldman, kidnaps them in order to keep Ava under his thumb. They pair are rescued from an abandoned ship by John, Steve and Ava although Clyde manages to escape from prison. After recovering physically and mentally, Wendy decides to go visit her parents in Hong Kong, and Tripp decides to leave with her.

Charlie Mason and Richard Simms from Soaps She Knows named Wendy as their "Best New Character" in soap operas of 2022, commenting that "The moment Victoria Grace's Wendy appeared on the Days of Our Lives' spinoff Beyond Salem, we were both hooked and somewhat relentless in our determination to have Li's little sis brought over to the mothership."

== Jada Hunter ==
Jada Hunter
- Days of Our Lives character
- Portrayed by: Elia Cantu
- Duration: 2022–present
- First appearance: July 19, 2022
- Created by: Ron Carlivati
- Introduced by: Ken Corday and Albert Alarr
In-universe information
- Occupation: Police Detective
- Father: Marcus Hunter
- Sisters: Talia Hunter
- Grandparents: Samuel Hunter; Eleanor Hunter

Jade Hunter, played by Elia Cantu, made her first appearance on July 19, 2022. She was introduced as the a new detective at the Salem Police Department. Cantu's casting was announced by Soap Opera Digest. She is later revealed to be the daughter of Marcus Hunter (Richard Biggs). While Jada is her first daytime role, Cantu has appeared in several primetime series such as Criminal Minds, This Is Us, Black-ish, Lethal Weapon, 9-1-1 and Mom. In March 2026, Cantu began appearing on recurring status. That June, she announced her exit from the role.

Jada arrives in Salem in 2022 to interview for a job with the Salem police department. Jada makes an impression on police commissioner Rafe Hernandez (Galen Gering) due to her knowledge of the investigation into the recent murder of Abigail Deveraux (Marci Miller). Rafe hires her on the spot and her first assignment is to question Sarah Horton (Linsey Godfrey) about the murder. Jada reconnects with her father's friend Steve Johnson (Stephen Nichols) and his wife Kayla Brady (Mary Beth Evans) and thanks him for the job recommendation. When Jada kills a suspect her first day on the job, Kayla's nephew Eric (Greg Vaughan) comforts her. They later plan to go on a date and Eric offers her a room at his family's pub. However, the romance is plagued by Eric's lingering feelings for his ex-wife Nicole Walker (Arianne Zucker). Jada witnesses the two kiss plans to break it off with Eric when she passes out. Rafe rushes Jada to the hospital where she discovers she is pregnant. Despite the pregnancy, Jada and Eric agree to go their separate ways and raise the baby as co-parents. However, after Nicole warns her how hard it is being a single parent, Jada rethinks her decision and terminates her pregnancy.

In 2023, Jada and Rafe grow closer as they work together. Later, Jada's sister Talia Hunter arrives in town. Jada is concerned when Talia starts working at Sweet Bits Bakery instead of using her medical degree.

== Sloan Petersen ==
Sloan Petersen
- Days of Our Lives character
- Portrayed by: Jessica Serfaty (2022–2024); Natasha Hall (2024)
- Duration: 2022–2024
- First appearance: August 17, 2022
- Last appearance: June 3, 2024
- Created by: Ron Carlivati
- Introduced by: Ken Corday and Albert Alarr
In-universe information
- Other names: Nicole Walker
- Occupation: Lawyer
- Father: Nathan Bedford
- Mother: Martha Petersen-Bedford
- Brothers: Colin Bedford
- Husband: Eric Brady (2023-2024)

Sloan Petersen, portrayed by Jessica Serfaty, made her first appearance on August 17, 2022. She last appeared on June 3, 2024. Natasha Hall temporarily stepped into the role in March 2024 while Serfaty was on leave.

Sloan comes to Salem with a grudge against Paulina Price and her daughter, Chanel, for ruining her life. Chanel and her father, a college professor in London, had an affair and Sloan's mother, Martha, found out about it. She confronted Chanel on a rooftop where altercation caused Martha to fall to her death and Paulina to cover it up as a suicide. After Sloan learns the truth from her dying father, she makes it her mission to get revenge for what she perceives as her mother being murdered.

Sloan initially blackmails Paulina for money to keep the story out of the news as it would ruin Paulina race for governor. However, Sloan still turns them into the police anyway after an attempt was made to steal her file on the case in London. Despite humiliating the two women, Belle Black manages to have the case dropped as she convinced the London authorities not expedite either women. This did not stop Sloan from suing them in civil court for wrongful death which was thrown out too. At the same, she begins having a sexual relationship with Belle's half-brother Eric Brady after she helps get him out of jail for assault. Soon the relationship grows beyond sex and Sloan develops genuine feelings for Eric.

Later, she becomes entangled in her brother's revenge plot against Paulina and Chanel. Colin has Talia Hunter trash Paulina's office and spike biscuits with drugs at Chanel's bakery to get it shut down. She confronts him to tell him to stop, but he later has Paulina and Chanel at gunpoint and is forced to come clean about Colin to Rafe and Jada. Colin is arrested and he asks Sloan represent him.

Charlie Mason and Richard Simms from Soaps She Knows put Eric and Sloan's pairing as the "Best Random Pairing" in their "Soaps' Best and Worst of 2022", commenting that they "didn't see Sloan and Eric's sex-fueled romp coming, but once Days of Our Lives went there, all we could hope was that these two would keep coming back for more!"

== Talia Hunter ==
Talia Hunter
- Days of Our Lives character
- Portrayed by: Aketra Sellivian
- Duration: 2023
- First appearance: March 8, 2023
- Last appearance: October 17, 2023
- Created by: Ron Carlivati
- Introduced by: Ken Corday and Albert Alarr
In-universe information
- Occupation: Baker; Doctor
- Father: Marcus Hunter
- Sisters: Jada Hunter
- Grandparents: Samuel Hunter; Eleanor Hunter

Talia Hunter, played by Aketra Sellivian, was introduced on March 8, 2023, as the younger sister of Jada Hunter (Cantu) and daughter of the late Marcus Hunter (Biggs).

Talia comes to Salem looking for a job at Sweet Bits bakery. While the owner, Chanel Dupree (Bowens) is impressed with Talia's baking skills, Chanel invites her to submit an application. Talia reunites with her big sister, Jada Hunter and announces she is moving to Salem. Talia confuses Jada when she announces that she is working at the bakery even though she has a medical degree from Stanford University. She is revealed to have left the medical profession to help Colin Bedford, Sloan's brother, take down Paulina Price and Chanel Dupree for their role in his mother's death. After getting to know both women, Talia has second thoughts on their plan. After failing to go through with breaking Chanel's heart through making out with her, Talia comes clean about Colin's plan and soon discovers that Colin took Paulina hostage. With Jada, she attempts him from harming Paulina and Chanel which leads to the two falling off the roof of the Salem Inn. They both survive and are taken into custody in the hospital.

Upon her release on bail, she returns to Jada's apartment where Colin confronts her on her betrayal. She manages to get a message to Chanel that she's in danger and Rafe and Jada arrive to re-arrest him for escaping custody. She tries to make a life for herself in Salem and develops feelings for Chanel, however, the latter still has feelings for Johnny DiMera which leaves Talia heartbroken. She drinks and talks with Shawn Brady who is drunk and upset. They both have sex in her sister's apartment and both are ashamed. When the truth comes out, Shawn leaves Salem to check into rehab and Talia decides to move back to California.

Sellivian's casting and the character was announced in February 2023 in Soap Opera Digest. According to Ron Carlivati, Talia was introduced to "round out [Jada's] character and her family a little bit." There is a "mystery that remains to be unraveled" as Talia applies for a job at the bakery, even though she has a medical degree.

== Konstantin Meleounis ==
Konstantin Meleounis
- Days of Our Lives character
- Portrayed by: John Kapelos
- Duration: 2023–2024
- First appearance: April 10, 2023
- Last appearance: June 10, 2024
- Created by: Ron Carlivati
- Introduced by: Ken Corday and Albert Alarr
In-universe information
- Occupation: Restaurant owner Con artist
- Wife: Elizabeth (divorced)
- Daughters: Catherina
- Grandchildren: Mark Greene; Cat Greene; Felicity Greene; Aaron Greene

Konstantin Meleounis was played by John Kapleos from April 10, 2023 to June 10, 2024 and was friends with Victor Kiriakis. When first introduced, he initially thought Harris Michaels was still a criminal at large and Hope Brady cleared the situation. The two later had a meal and shared a dance at the old man's expense.

Upon learning his ties to Victor, Konstantin provided information on Victor's childhood home and was supposedly a confidant to Victor. When an issue with his will came up, Konstantin told Brady and Alex about their meeting and questioned why he would destroy his will. It is revealed later that he was promised by Victor to be in his will and when he and Theresa Donovan read the will, they learn not only was he not included, but Victor's unacknowledged son, Xander Cook, would inherit half his fortune and controlling interest in TITAN Industries. Furious at being excluded, partly due to his father had given Victor the money he needed to build TITAN, and that feeling Xander underserving of Victor's estate, he conspires with Theresa to make it look that Alex Kiriakis is Victor's son and later decides to con Maggie, Victor's widow, out her half of the estate.

While gaining Maggie's trust with kind words, gifts, stories about Victor, and "saving" Sarah's daughter Victoria from a kidnapper (Theresa in disguise), others like Steve Johnson and John Black were not convinced by Konstantin's act and try to threaten him into leaving Salem. However, the old man remembers John and realizes he was "The Pawn", an assassin once under Victor's control, and that Steve knows about it. Konstantin decides to put this information to use for himself as The Pawn killed his daughter when he worked under Victor, for which Konstantin swore revenge on the assassin.

When Maggie agrees to a green card marriage, he intends to destroy her pre-nup and kill her with John's help, but she turns the tables on him and he is exposed for his crimes, even admitting that he sabotaged Victor's plane so that it would crash. Shooting Steve and taking Theresa hostage, Konstantin attempts to flee but cornered by Brady, Alex, and Xander. Theresa attempts to get away from him but as he strangles her, he is shot and killed by Xander.

Cat Greene revealed in 2025 that Konstantin was abusive to his wife, Elizabeth, and that she asked Victor to help her escape with her daughter. He sent John to fake Catherina's death so she could divorce Konstantin out of grief and secretly raise her daughter in the US.

== Colin Bedford ==
Colin Bedford
- Days of Our Lives character
- Portrayed by: Jasper Newman
- Duration: 2023
- First appearance: April 26, 2023
- Last appearance: June 29, 2023
- Created by: Ron Carlivati
- Introduced by: Ken Corday and Albert Alarr
In-universe information
- Father: Nathan Bedford
- Mother: Martha Petersen-Bedford
- Sisters: Sloan Petersen

Colin Bedford is a character on Days of the Lives and is portrayed by Jasper Newman.

Colin is Sloan Petersen's brother and attempted to get revenge on Paulina and Chanel for his mother's death after Sloan efforts failed. He used Talia Hunter to carry out his deeds which resulted in Paulina suffering panic attacks and Chanel having her bakery temporarily shut down. After Sloan discovers his plans, she tries to convince him to stop as people believe she's the culprit and is falling in love with Eric Brady. However, he doesn't stop and eventually kidnaps Paulina after assaulting Abe Carver in order have her jump of a roof in the same fashion as his mother supposedly died. Chanel arrives to see Colin about to kill her and decides kill them both. However, Jada and Talia try to stop him which leads to Talia trying to take his gun and both fall off the roof, but they survive. At the hospital, he escapes custody to threaten Talia after she betrayed him, but Chanel managed to get Jada and Rafe up to her apartment before she could be harmed.

Sloan acted as his lawyer and he refused to plead guilty and wished her luck with her relationship with Eric as she deserved a chance at happiness.

== Connie Viniski ==
Connie Viniski was a character introduced in Days of Our Lives in 2023. Played by Julie Dove, her role was expanded following a demo reel in scenes with Billy Flynn (Chad DiMera) and Marci Miller (Abigail Deveraux) where Connie tried to warn Abigail away from Chad since she read he had cheated on her with Gwen Rizczech.

Connie first appeared as a client of Sloan Petersen's who was really nervous about it her court date. Later, she appeared as Li Shin's blind date through a matchmaker service. However, Li was uninterested in the date due to his feelings for Melinda Trask. Here she reveals that she is a fan of true crime podcasts and despite Li's disinterest, Connie develops an unhealthy obsession with Li, blaming Melinda for his murder.

She resurfaces in June 2024 where she manages to both move into Li's old apartment and gain a job as Gabi's assistant at DiMera. It's soon revealed that she killed Li in a fit of rage after a failed attempt to seduce him and so he wouldn't call the police on her. She blames Gabi and Stefan for breaking Li's spirit and leading to his death and vowed revenge by ruining their marriage. She overhears Ava Vitali mentioning her affair with Stefan and informs Gabi who is livid. During this time, she also deals with Everett Lynch after he reveals he overheard her mentioning she killed Li with his "Bobby" personality took over. She offers to get Rafe out of the way so he and rekindle his relationship with ex-wife Jada. He is disturbed to find out she tried to kill Rafe, leading his coma. Anxious, Connie decides to poison Everett believing it was the only way to ensure his silence. She would also frame him for Li's death and stabbing Rafe along with staging his death as a suicide.

Later, Melinda discovers Connie faked her resume and that she had trouble with a previous employer and promptly went to fire her. But Connie drugs Melinda and prepares to kill her, but a hallucination of Li, who she has a cardboard cutout of, convinces her to show mercy. She ties Melinda to her bed and continues her plot against Gabi. Seeing that Gabi is still happy, Connie decides to kill her instead along with Melinda. Trapping them in the DiMera mansion's secret room, she sets off a homemade bomb to kill them and later unsuccessfully tries to kill Ava and Stefan. She caught by Jada and arrested. Seeing that Connie believe the Li cutout is real and alive, Jada summarizes that she most likely will end up in Bayview Sanitarium and not prison.

== Whitley King ==
Whitley King
- Days of Our Lives character
- Portrayed by: Kim Coles
- Duration: 2023, 2025
- First appearance: May 30, 2023
- Last appearance: February 5, 2025
- Created by: Ron Carlivati
- Introduced by: Ken Corday and Albert Alarr
In-universe information
- Spouse: Husband †

Whitley King is a character from Days of Our Lives portrayed by Kim Coles.

Working as a nurse in Salem University Hospital, she developed an obsession with Abe Carver, Whitley kidnapped him after he lost his memory from Colin Bedford's attack and he mistook her for his wife Paulina. She kept him confined to her apartment and attempted to convince him that she and him are husband and wife, going as far as to hire an actor as his son Theo, faking his death to the public, and latter drugging him to keep him at bay.

Marlena discovers that Whitley was a former patient of hers and that she had accidentally killed her husband and cats when a space heater malfunctioned and leaked carbon monoxide, poisoning them. Blaming herself for the incident, she sought Marlena for help not knowing she was possessed by the Devil. Not getting the help she needed, her mental health deteriorated.

Lani, on furlough for Abe's funeral, learns the truth from Whitley's actor accomplice and tries to rescue him. However, Whitley drugs her and leaves her near the docks. Seeing no escape in sight, Whitley attempts murder-suicide on Abe and her but is stopped by Rafe, Jada and Marlena. Abe is rescued and she agrees to finally get help for her mental illness. She appears later in a nightmare Paulina has on Halloween where she escape from Bayview and convinces Abe that Paulina is her and she is Whitley.

She returned on February 5, 2025 where she reveals that she's the one responsible for causing harm to the cast and crew of Abe's reboot of "Body and Soul", her favorite soap opera. She believed that they were ruining it and felt she had to stop them. He and Paulina stopped her before anymore she could do more harm.

== Everett Lynch ==
Everett Lynch
- Days of Our Lives character
- Portrayed by: Blake Berris
- Duration: 2023–2024
- First appearance: October 30, 2023
- Last appearance: August 1, 2024
- Created by: Ron Carlivati
- Introduced by: Ken Corday and Albert Alarr
In-universe information
- Father: Mr. Stein
- Mother: Helen Lynch
- Spouse: Jada Hunter

Everett Lynch is portrayed by Blake Berris, who had previously portrayed Nick Fallon years earlier.

Everett arrives in Salem as the Salem Spectator's new editor-in-chief as well as reconnect with his former girlfriend, Stephanie Johnson, who thought he abandoned her while living in Seattle at the time. He reveals that he was mailing a letter and was hit by a car which put him in a coma for a year. When he came to, Everett had no idea who he was until he gained some memories, including his time with Stephanie. After she breaks up with Chad, Stephanie gives him another chance. Soon, it's revealed that Everett is Bobby Stein, Jada's ex-husband who cheated on her with a girl who turns out to be Stephanie. After discovering he is Bobby Stein, Marlena and others assume he suffers from retrograde amnesia, coming up with his new name using his middle name "Everett" and his mother's maiden name, "Lynch".

Marlena soon discovers that Everett has Dissociative Identity Disorder (DID) after he begins acting strange. "Bobby" had taken over in order to protect him from reliving his childhood trauma of abuse at the hands of his father. Jada and Stephanie are able to convince him to get help, but he soon fakes recovery to get out of the hospital. He remembers that Connie Viniski killed Li Shin and attempts to use the information to get closer to Jada. Connie discovers this and agrees to get Rafe, her boyfriend, out of the way by attempting to murder him. "Bobby" is disturbed by this and Connie decides to poison him in order to keep her secret safe. Before he dies, Jada and Stephanie find him and he reverts to Everett long enough to apologize to Stephanie.

== Cat Greene ==
Cat Greene
- Days of Our Lives character
- Portrayed by: AnnaLynne McCord
- Duration: 2024–present
- First appearance: June 19, 2024
- Created by: Ron Carlivati
- Introduced by: Ken Corday and Janet Spellman-Drucker
In-universe information
- Occupation: Assistant; ISA Analyst
- Family: Greene
- Parents: Catherina Meleounis
- Siblings: Mark Greene; Felicity Greene; Aaron Greene
- Grandparents: Konstantin Meleounis; Elizabeth Meleounis
- Nieces and nephews: Trey DiMera

Cat Greene is a character from Day of Our Lives and portrayed by AnnaLynne McCord.

Cat was being held captive by Clyde Weston. Cat was in a car accident with her parents Mr. Greene and Catherina. She had plastic surgery to look like Abigail Deveraux as part of a ploy by Clyde to rob Chad of his money and kill him after. She was to marry him as "Abigail" and gain the access to his money while her brother Mark was to shoot him. But both were hesitant to continue with the plan although Steve Johnson thwarted the assassination attempt. She explained that their mother was held captive by Clyde and were desperate to free her. The Hortons and Chad refused to forgive them for their deceit regardless.

Despite his amnesty, Chad uses her to both capture Clyde, find Cat's mother, and find out what Clyde did with Abigail's body. Catherina was found but partly unstable. Before Clyde can reveal Abigail's whereabouts, he is shot by Catherina but remains in a coma. She and her siblings briefly leave Salem to spend time with their mother at a Canada hospital.

She and Felicity return to Salem and worked for Marlena while she and Chad begun developing feeling with each other. Julie, Jack and Jennifer are outraged that Chad is forming a friendship with her let alone have feelings for her. Apart from that, Shane Donovan reminds her of her ISA background work which led her to Clyde Weston and her family being involved with it. He asks her to spy on EJ DiMera after he buys Salem University Hospital to find out what he was up to. Rafe assists her and they discover that EJ had a backer help him acquire the funds and that a secret room in the hospital was being built under the guise as the Tom Horton Free Clinic.

== Javi Hernandez ==
Javi Hernandez is a character introduced on Days of Our Lives on October 28, 2024. He is portrayed by Al Calderon. He was introduced as the cousin of Rafe and Gabi Hernandez.

He arrives in Salem following his mother's death and forms a connection with Leo Stark. He learns of his past and still gives him a chance despite a brief setback when Leo accused him of impersonating as "Lady Whistleblower", his non-de plume at The Spectator. After all is forgiven, Javi reveals that he was training to be an EMS for a firehouse in his native Texas. However, he struggled to come out as gay and when he told someone in the firehouse whom he thought was a friend, he was bullied by his boss until he quit.

== See also ==
- List of Days of Our Lives characters
- List of Days of Our Lives characters (1960s)
- List of Days of Our Lives characters (1970s)
- List of Days of Our Lives characters (1980s)
- List of Days of Our Lives characters (1990s)
- List of Days of Our Lives characters (2000s)
- List of Days of Our Lives characters (2010s)
- List of Days of Our Lives cast members
- List of previous Days of Our Lives cast members
