= Eric Brady =

- Days of Our Lives character
- Greg Vaughan as Eric Brady
- Portrayed by: Rory Beauregard (1984–1985); Jesse Davis (1985–1986); Edward Palma (1986); Bradley Hallock (1986–1992); Scotty Hauser (1997); Jensen Ackles (1997–2000); Greg Vaughan (2012–2025); Jason Gerhardt (2023)
- Duration: 1984–1992; 1997–2000; 2012–2025
- First appearance: October 16, 1984
- Last appearance: November 17, 2025
- Created by: Margaret DePriest, Sheri Anderson and Thom Racina
- Introduced by: Betty Corday and Al Rabin (1984); Ken Corday and Tom Langan (1997); Ken Corday, Lisa de Cazotte and Greg Meng (2012); Ken Corday, Albert Alarr and Greg Meng (2017); Ken Corday and Albert Alarr (2021)
- Spin-off appearances: Days of Our Lives: A Very Salem Christmas (2021)
In-universe information
- Other names: Eric Roman Brady
- Occupation: Social Worker; Photographer; Priest
- Parents: Roman Brady; Marlena Evans
- Stepfather: John Black
- Sisters: Sami Brady
- Half-brothers: DJ Craig; Rex Brady
- Half-sisters: Carrie Brady; Cassie Brady; Belle Black
- Wife: Nicole Walker (2020–2021); Sloan Peterson (2023–2024)
- Sons: Jude Roman Brady
- Daughters: Mackenzie Horton
- Grandfathers: Shawn Brady; Frank Evans
- Grandmothers: Caroline Brady; Martha Evans
- Uncles: Bo Brady; Frankie Brady (adoptive); Max Brady (adoptive)
- Aunts: Kimberly Brady; Kayla Brady; Samantha Evans
- Nephews: Will Horton; Johnny DiMera; Noah Reed Tate Black (step)
- Nieces: Allie Horton; Sydney DiMera; Claire Brady; Grace Brady (legal); Emily Lockhart
- First cousins: Andrew Donovan; Theresa Donovan; Stephanie Johnson; Joey Johnson; Shawn Brady; Chelsea Brady; Zack Brady; Ciara Brady

Eric Brady is a fictional character from Days of Our Lives, an American soap opera on NBC/Peacock, played since 2012 by Greg Vaughan, the longest tenured actor in the role. Eric was introduced in the episode of October 16, 1984, together with his twin sister, Sami Brady.

Initially played by a series of child actors, Jensen Ackles was cast in the role of Eric when the character was rapidly-aged from a pre-teen to a young adult in July 1997 under the pen of headwriter James E. Reilly. Ackles' Eric appeared for three years until August 2000, when he departed. Vaughan portrayed Eric from 2012 to 2024, remaining with the serial for 12 years, longer than any other portrayer in the role.

Eric and Sami are the children of supercouple Roman Brady and Marlena Evans. The twins Eric and Sami care deeply about each other, but have completely different personalities. Eric's saintly behavior sets him up as the better half to his very troubled and trouble-making sister Sami. A notable storyline for Eric is his passionate, but frustrated, love affair with Nicole Walker (Arianne Zucker). Having once been a priest, Eric is a community-orientated person, briefly running the Horton Center, which helps people in need.

Both Ackles and Vaughan's performances have been met with favorable reception from audiences and critics. Ackles received three Daytime Emmy Award nominations for Outstanding Younger Actor in a Drama Series in 1998, 1999 and 2000, as well as a Soap Opera Digest Award in 1998. Vaughan received the Daytime Emmy Award for Outstanding Supporting Actor in a Drama Series in 2018.

== Casting ==
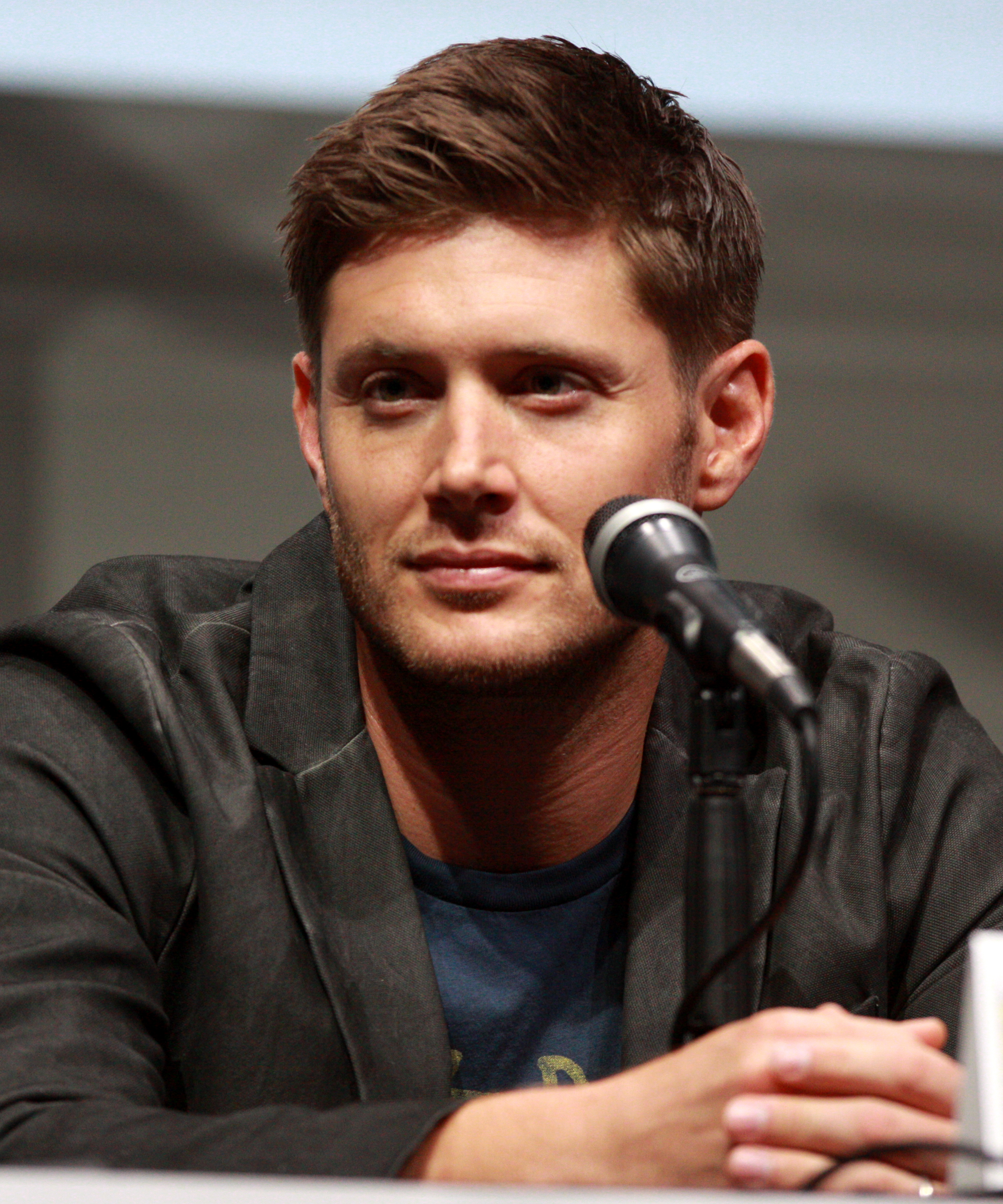
Jensen Ackles portrayed the role of Eric Brady for three years, before leaving to pursue a development deal with ABC.

As a baby, Eric was portrayed by Rory Beauregard (October 19, 1984, to May 30, 1985) and Jesse Davis (December 6, 1985, to March 17, 1986). Child actor Edward Palma appeared briefly when Eric was rapidly-aged about two years (August 7 to September 9, 1986), and then child actor Bradley Hallock played Eric over an almost six-year period (December 18, 1986, to July 1, 1992). In 1997, Scotty Hauser portrayed Eric in a voiceover.

Jensen Ackles took up the role of Eric as a regular player on July 28, 1997. Ackles had auditioned for the role of Eric several times before he was actually hired. The extensive process led to him rethinking his budding career as an actor. In the summer of 2000, during an interview Soap Opera Digest, Ackles revealed he would soon exit from the series after obtaining a development deal with ABC. Ackles' final appearance was on August 23, 2000, but Ackles thought that he might return. In December 2000, it was reported that NBC had approached Ackles to reprise the role in early 2001, but he had respectfully declined. Reports also surfaced that the producers had considered actor Shane McDermott, who was previously known for his portrayal of Scott Chandler on ABC's All My Children to take over the role, but executive producer Ken Corday shot down the rumors, saying there were no plans to recast the role.

In February 2011, it was reported that Greg Vaughan, known for his roles as General Hospital's Lucky Spencer and The Young and the Restless's Diego Guittierez, had turned down a testing deal with Days. But when in June 2012 Soap Opera Digest announced that Vaughan would star in the Hallmark movie Second Chances alongside Alison Sweeney (who plays Eric's twin sister Sami on Days) rumors abounded that Days might really be interested in Vaughan for the role of Eric, with TV Guide's Nelson Branco reporting that several sources were saying Vaughan had signed on as Eric, despite no confirmation from NBC. The next month, Soaps In Depth confirmed that Vaughan was set to join Days, and on August 8, 2012, Soap Opera Digest revealed he had begun taping as Eric Brady. His first air date was later confirmed as November 13, 2012. Vaughan told soap journalist Michael Fairman that when he initially auditioned for the role of Eric, he was rejected – but now he was happy that he had earned the job instead of having it handed to him.

Vaughan had a short break from Days of Our Lives in 2016, when he took up opportunities to appear on Queen Sugar and Lucifer. Vaughan returned to playing Eric in the episode of January 17, 2017. In July 2020, he announced he wrapped up his run as Eric prior to the COVID-19 pandemic shutdown; he exited during the September 23 episode. He then returned in July 2021, and from December 27 to 29 of that same year. He also appeared on the spinoff movie, Days of Our Lives: A Very Salem Christmas, which premiered on December 16, 2021.

In August 2023, Jason Gerhardt filled in for Vaughan as Eric Brady for five episodes while Vaughan recovered from COVID-19.

On July 30, 2024, Vaughan announced his exit from the role, with his final appearance debuting the day prior. In statements on social media, he cited as his exit as "not my choice". Soap Opera Digest, however, reported the day of Vaughan's final scenes it would not be the "last fans will see of Eric." Vaughan returned to the role in November 2025 in a guest capacity.

== Development ==
On April 30, and May 1, 1998, LeAnn Rimes made a two-episode guest appearance in the series as a teenage runaway, Madison, and Eric keeps her from getting arrested when she steals some food. Eric is drawn to Madison because she reminds him of Sami. Eric takes her to his grandparents home and lets her spend the night before his aunt Kimberly Brady (Patsy Pease) convinces her that living a life on the street isn't what she wants. Eric goes to take Madison to the bus stop so she can return home and she apparently develops some romantic feelings for him. She promises to return to Salem some day.

Eric always appears to be the more level headed of the twins and usually tries to talk sense into his sister, Sami. At the time of Eric's departure in 2000, he is very confused about his life. In mid August 2012, Kristian Alfonso posted a picture on Twitter of herself, Vaughan and a few co-stars, with Vaughan wearing a clerical collar which immediately led to speculation that the character of Eric had become a priest. Greg Vaughan revealed in an interview with Soaps In Depth that "Eric had been at a place in his life where his relationships had all gone awry." Eric needs a more clear cut path for his life and goes off to a third world country to work as a photojournalist. The unstable environment triggers something in Eric and he enters the priesthood. In December 2012, Vaughan revealed to TV Source Magazine that the series would soon delve into Eric's past, and what led to him becoming priest. Vaughan like many others was skeptical about the character of Eric being re-introduced as a priest. However, Vaughan looked at the plot twist as a challenge. "It's been a growing process for the character," said Vaughan. Upon Vaughan's introduction, Eric and Sami are still very close as she is the first person that he informs about his decision to become a priest. Despite him being away, Sami is "confidant and connection" to their family and the rest of Salem. When asked about Eric possibly falling for Nicole again, Vaughan said that Eric was a lot older and wiser, and could see Nicole's schemes coming. However, Vaughan said that the duo would be very platonic friends and praised the writers for the pacing and allowing the relationship to grow organically. Vaughan said that viewers would begin to notice an emotional "tug of war" between Nicole and Eric as they try to work out their feelings.

== Storylines ==
Eric and his twin sister, Samantha "Sami" Brady were born in 1984 to Roman Brady and his wife, Marlena Evans. Eric is named after his great uncle, Eric Brady Sr. Following their mother's supposed death in the spring of 1987, the twins are sent to live with Marlena's parents, Frank and Martha in Colorado. However, the twins continue appearing onscreen through frequent visits to Salem. Eric last appears as a child in the summer of 1992, and the twins are rapidly-aged off-screen. Whilst Sami re-arrives in Salem in 1993 as a sixteen-year old in 1993, Eric stays a while longer in Colorado with his grandparents, arriving back in Salem in 1997. Eric and Sami have four half-siblings: their paternal half siblings are Carrie, Rex, and Cassie Brady. Belle Black is their maternal half-sister, and Brady Black is their stepbrother.

Eric returns home to Salem in the summer of 1997, and he is against his mother's relationship with John Black. Meanwhile, he suspects Sami of faking amnesia to get Austin Reed to fall in love with her. With the help of Carrie and her friend, Mike Horton, Eric helps uncover Sami's schemes just before her wedding to Austin. The group also reveals that Sami's son Will was actually fathered by Lucas Roberts, not Austin as Sami has been claiming. Sami is furious with Eric for his betrayal but she soon forgives him when she realizes he did not intend to hurt her. Eric soon realizes he is being stalked by an old schoolmate, Jed Fox. Eric had previously been accused of date rape when Jed was the actual culprit. Jed threatens to kill Sami unless Eric takes responsibility for the rape; however, Eric convinces Jed to admit to his crimes and accept his punishment. Eric later develops an infatuation with the waitress Nicole Walker. Eric begins working as a photographer for Countess Wilhelmina Cosmetics and tries to get Nicole hired as a model. Nicole and Eric eventually begin dating, but the relationship is strained thanks to Nicole's checkered past. When Eric focuses his attention on Sami's upcoming murder trial, Nicole falls for Lucas. Eric soon falls for an older woman, Greta Von Amberg, and he breaks up with Nicole when she suddenly marries Lucas in 1999. Sami is convicted of murder and sentenced to death, leaving her family devastated. Fortunately, Lucas admits to the crime to save Sami, and his mother, Kate Roberts, gets a dying man to write a false confession to the murder, freeing both Sami and Lucas. Eric's relationship with Greta is strained because he still has lingering feelings for Nicole. Greta realizes that Eric will never get over Nicole and ends the relationship. After nearly being killed in a railway, Eric decides to leave Salem. Eric leaves town in July 2000 after he admits to Nicole that he will always love her. In June 2008, Sami revealed that Eric had been in a car accident in Colorado. Though he doesn't suffer any serious injuries, Marlena rushes to his side.

Eric returns to Salem in November 2012 as a priest at St. Luke's church. Eric hires Nicole to work as the secretary at the church. Eric opens up to Nicole about the violence he experienced while working as a photographer in the Congo. Eric is wary of Nicole's lingering feelings for him and also harbors some feelings for her. Eric reluctantly begins working with Kristen DiMera (Eileen Davidson) on his new school project for the community. He disapproves of Kristen's romance with his step-brother, Brady Black (Eric Martsolf), and by the time he is able to get past his reservations and agrees to counsel them before their wedding, Eric uncovers repressed memories of Kristen drugging and raping him. He then is kidnapped by Stefano DiMera with Nicole in an attempt to cover up for his daughter. Waiting together for their deaths, Nicole confesses that she still loves Eric and Eric, although he is astonished, confesses that he still loves her. They are rescued and brought to the hospital. After being released, he talks to Nicole and tells her that to get back his priesthood, which had been stripped after the wedding fiasco, he has to go on sabbatical. Nicole is shocked and hurt, especially when she remembers him telling her that he loves her. But he continues by saying that the real reason to go on sabbatical is to see if he can be the husband to Nicole that she deserves. He then leaves Salem. With the proof now resurfaced, the Vatican agrees to hear Eric's case about being reinstated to the priesthood. Nicole even travels to Rome to testify that she kept the proof from Eric for selfish reasons. Moved by her testimony and the proof, the bishop offers Eric admission back into the priesthood. But, still troubled by his inability to forgive Nicole, Eric turns it down. He returns to Salem and works as a photographer for the PR department at University Hospital.

He spends months fighting with Nicole, who keeps pleading with him to try to forgive her. But he can't. He finally finds a distraction when his ex-girlfriend, Serena Mason, comes to Salem in the winter of 2014 to do medical research for a story that she is working on. Eric and Serena met in Africa while she was there on a story assignment, and they fell in love. Serena initially did not stand in Eric's way when he felt drawn to the priesthood, but as soon as she heard that Eric had left the priesthood, she wanted to see if there was another chance for them. Eric is happy to see her when she arrives in Salem.

Their relationship moves quickly, but Serena is also in town for other motives, as she has orders to retrieve a piece of artwork that Eric acquired when the two of them were in Africa that contains smuggled diamonds. Eric's relationship with Serena is bothersome to Nicole, and she tries and fails several times to break it up. Eric later breaks up with Serena after discovering that she slept with her boss, Xander Cook. Later, Eric and Nicole are locked in the basement of the news station by Xander. Facing death, Eric and Nicole share a tender moment, and they realize they still have feelings for each other. But Nicole is engaged to Daniel Jonas, and when Eric and Nicole escape the basement, Nicole breaks things off with Eric, leaving him devastated. In August 2015, Eric finds Serena strangled to death in the park (she is the first victim of the Necktie Killer). Eric begins to drink excessively. In January 2016, while driving drunk, he caused a car accident, injuring himself, Brady, Jennifer Horton, and his best friend, Daniel, who died. In April 2016, Eric was sentenced to five years in prison for vehicular manslaughter.

Eric is released for good behavior and makes his way back to Salem, now sober. However, no one is willing to forgive him, especially Nicole, as he killed her fiancé, Daniel. When Nicole goes through her baby troubles, Eric tries to become a shoulder for her to lean on. However, she still doesn't find that acceptable. When Nicole is kidnapped by Xander, on the orders of Deimos Kiriakis, Eric hatches a plan to save her with Brady. Eric saves Nicole, but she still denies him forgiveness.

When Nicole returns to Salem, she is sentenced to community service for abducting Holly, a baby who is her biological child, but who is legally the child of Chloe Lane. She is sentenced to work at the Horton Center, where Eric works. There, Nicole is finally able to forgive Eric and discovers he never stopped loving her. Eric and Nicole have a night of passion, but Nicole is now in a relationship with Brady, and he finds out. Brady is furious, and he blackmails Nicole to leave town after telling Eric that she does not love him, leaving Eric devastated. When Eric's nephew Will is found to be alive but without any memories of his family and life in Salem, Eric helps Will and Sami to re-build their relationship.

Eric starts dating Jennifer Horton, who knows Nicole was nervous over something when she left town but never tells Eric. Eric asks Jen to marry him. Jen finds out (from Eve) that Brady forced Nicole out of town, and that is why she left Eric. She waits months to tell him (after years before telling Nicole you cannot base a relationship on a lie) before finally letting him know, and he runs out on her, devastated that she lied to him for so long about Nicole. He confronts Brady, who admits it's true, then begs Maggie to tell him if she knows where Nicole is. Jen, knowing she never had Eric, gives back her ring. Maggie finds out it's true what Brady and Victor did, so he tells Eric where Nicole is. Eric runs there, only to find that Xander has forced Nicole to marry him, or he would tell her secret to the police. She is the one who (while drugged) killed Deimos. Eric and Nicole plan to escape and need to find the proof Xander has on Nicole. Only to get caught by Xander, and then in a warehouse fire, Nicole gets trapped in an explosion. Eric vows to stay with her, only to get knocked out by Brady and dragged out. Nicole is M.I.A and presumed dead. Later, Kristen returns in a Nicole mask and pretends to be Nicole to lure Brady to bed and get pregnant. Xander and Kristen work together to kidnap Holly and fake her death. Allowing "fake" Nicole to blame Eric. When it is found out that the real Nicole and Holly are alive and being held by Kristen, Eric goes to look for Nicole. Nicole and Holly then return to Salem with Eric's help, and they rekindle their relationship. Over a year later, Eric breaks up with Nicole after he finds out that she knew that he was the father of Sarah's baby, Mackenzie. They later reconcile after Eric forgives Nicole, but further heartbreak follows, as it is revealed that Mackenzie is actually the daughter of Brady and Kristen, who was switched at birth by Xander, as the real baby had died, leaving Eric devastated. Later that year, he and Nicole finally marry. In September 2020, Eric leaves Salem to return to the Congo in an effort to help residents after a string of misfortunate events.

Eric returns the following year and divorces Nicole when she finds out that she cheated on him. Eric later returns to perform an emergency exorcism on Marlena, who has been possessed again. The Devil tries to tempt by morphing into Kristen but he is able to resist. When Eric returns again, he begins dating Jada Hunter (Elia Cantu) but breaks up with her to be with Nicole. Jada, who is pregnant with Eric's child, has an abortion after a talk with Nicole, which devastates Eric, who breaks up with Nicole and starts behaving erratically. Eric begins seeing Sloan Petersen (Jessica Serfaty). They develop a relationship, but he had a drug fueled one night stand with Nicole the following year after they are both drugged by tainted biscuits. Nicole becomes pregnant and is unsure whether Eric is the father, so Sloan fakes a paternity test in order to rule out Eric as the father. Sloan later suggests to Eric that they have a child together. Sloan becomes pregnant but miscarries. The couple attempt to adopt a child with Melinda Trask's help with no luck until Dimitri Von Leuschner shows up and hands Sloan and Melinda Nicole's baby. Eric is led to believe that Jude is an adopted baby until he learns that the child was Nicole's and he ends his relationship with Sloan. It wouldn't be until later when he learns from Gabi during a press conference that EJ held that Eric learns he is Jude's biological father and not EJ, and that EJ hid the truth from them both. Once the truth is out, Nicole serves EJ with divorce papers and she her and Eric leave for Paris with baby Jude.

Later in fall 2024, Eric returns to Salem to help Brady who relapsed his addiction and is involved in a car accident that paralyzes Sarah. During this, Holly accidentally discovers the truth of Eric was the one who inadvertently killed her father in a drunk hit-and-run. She refuses to forgive him until he encourages to go to Paris and talk with her mother on why she was lied to all those years. Once Brady is cleared of the charges and Holly forgives him, Eric returns to Paris.

== Reception ==
Ackles was described as a "heartthrob" and became very popular during his time with the series. His popularity also leads to guest appearance by LeAnn Rimes. Ackles received three Daytime Emmy Award nominations for Outstanding Younger Actor in a Drama Series in 1998, 1999 and 2000. Ackles also won "Best Male Newcomer" at the 1998 Soap Opera Digest Awards. Ackles was also named by TV Guide on its list of the "12 Hottest New Stars" in 1998.

Jamey Giddens scolded the series for offering a veteran actor like Vaughan, with a huge fanbase, a testing deal as opposed to an actual role. Giddens also urged the producers to cast Vaughan in the either the role of Eric or Philip Kiriakis. The picture of Vaughan wearing a priest's collar stirred up some controversy among fans and critics, with some believing it would limit the kind of storylines that Eric could be involved in. Jillian Bowe responded to the picture with this statement: "Bless Me Father: Why is Greg Vaughan Wearing a Clerical Collar on Set of Days of Our Lives?!" Ackles personally called Vaughan to wish him well in his portrayal of Eric. Speaking of their exchange, Vaughan stated: "The character is near and dear to his heart and he said, 'Greg, it just gives me a little more gratification knowing that somebody I respect in the business is playing the part."

In 2020, Charlie Mason from Soaps She Knows placed Eric at #16 on a list of the 35 most memorable characters from Days of Our Lives, saying "It's hard to be a good guy among Salem's lot. So Jensen Ackles' and then Greg Vaughan's aspirational character was reminded over and over during his long run". Mason and Richard Simms from Soaps She Knows put Eric and Sloan's pairing as the "Best Random Pairing" in their "Soaps' Best and Worst of 2022", commenting that they "didn't see Sloan and Eric's sex-fueled romp coming, but once Days of Our Lives went there, all we could hope was that these two would keep coming back for more!" In 2024, as part of their year-end review, Soap Opera News editor Michael Thomas listed Zucker's exit with Vaughan as their second most-shocking soap opera exit of the year.
