= Days of Our Lives: A Very Salem Christmas =

- Directed by: Noel Maxam
- Written by: Ron Carlivati
- Screenplay by: David Kreizman
- Story by: Ryan Quan
- Based on: Days of Our Lives by Ted Corday; Betty Corday
- Produced by: Ken Corday; Albert Alarr
- Starring: Chandler Massey; Eileen Davidson; Alison Sweeney; Deidre Hall; Drake Hogestyn; Jackée Harry; Arianne Zucker; Daniel Feuerriegel; Paul Telfer; Greg Rikaart; Zach Tinker; Billy Flynn; Camila Banus; Blake Berris; Eric Martsolf; Lucas Adams; Raven Bowens; Lindsay Arnold; Carson Boatman
- Production companies: Corday Productions; Sony Pictures Television
- Distributed by: Peacock
- Release date: December 16, 2021
- Running time: 78 minutes
- Country: United States
- Language: English

Days of Our Lives: A Very Salem Christmas, directed by Noel Maxam, is an American Christmas film based on the daytime soap opera television series, Days of Our Lives. It premiered on Peacock on December 16, 2021.

As of 2023, Peacock has removed the movie from their library along with the spinoff show, Beyond Salem.

== Premise ==
Will Horton (Chandler Massey) writes a script involving the residents of his hometown, Salem, Illinois, before his Christmas Eve deadline.

== Cast ==
=== Main ===
- Deidre Hall as Marlena Evans
- Drake Hogestyn as John Black
- Alison Sweeney as Sami Brady
- Jackée Harry as Paulina Price
- Arianne Zucker as Nicole DiMera
- Eric Martsolf as Brady Black
- Camila Banus as Gabi Hernandez
- Paul Telfer as Xander Kiriakis
- Daniel Feuerriegel as EJ DiMera
- Blake Berris as Nick Fallon
- Lucas Adams as Tripp Dalton
- Lindsay Arnold as Allie Horton
- Raven Bowens as Chanel Dupree
- Carson Boatman as Johnny DiMera
- Chandler Massey as Will Horton
- Zach Tinker as Sonny Kiriakis
- Greg Rikaart as Leo Stark
- Evelyn Stephenson as Sydney DiMera
- Billy Flynn as Chad DiMera
- Eileen Davidson as Kristen Black
- Greg Vaughan as Eric Brady

== Production ==
On November 15, 2021, Davidson announced the first Days of Our Lives movie, A Very Salem Christmas for Peacock at The Real Housewives Ultimate Girls Trip event in Malibu. Along with the announcement, it was revealed Davidson and Massey would star. On November 22, 2021, it was announced Sweeney had also been cast; the film's full cast list was revealed later the same day.
