= William Christian (actor) =

American stage and television actor

- Born: William Leonard Christian; September 30, 1955 (age 70); Washington, D.C., U.S.
- Education: Catholic University of America; American University
- Occupation: Actor
- Years active: 1985–present
- Spouse: Gail Samuel (m. 2002)
- Children: 2

William Leonard Christian (born September 30, 1955) is an American stage and television actor. He portrayed Police Chief Derek Frye on the soap opera All My Children from 1990 to 2007, and portrayed TR Coates on Days of Our Lives.

== Early life and education ==
Born in Washington, D.C., Christian attended elementary school at St. Francis De Sales where he was first exposed to acting. He then attended Archbishop Carroll High School where he participated in the theater program. Christian attended at the Catholic University of America, where he learned about theatre and earned his bachelor's degree. He then attended at the American University, where earned his master's degree based on drama.

== Career ==
Christian moved to New York in the early 1980s, for which he was a member of the Actors Information Project, where he performed in stage productions. He appeared in commercials such as American Express and Burger King, among others. Christian performed in the 1989 Off-Broadway revival of the play The Member of the Wedding, appearing with actress Esther Rolle. Christian guest-starred in television programs including The Cosby Show, ER, Malcolm in the Middle, Spin City, Hand of God (four episodes), Matlock, Desperate Housewives and Monk. In 1990, he was cast in the recurring role of Dr. Marshall Redd on Another World. He then went on to portray the role of Derek Frye on All My Children from 1990 to 2007. For this, he was nominated for a Daytime Emmy Award in the category Outstanding Supporting Actor in a Drama Series in 1991. In 1995, Christian had spoken out at the Youth Forum Against Violence at the Network Club, making a speech to young people in Springfield, Massachusetts. In 1996, he appeared in the Off-Broadway revival of the play The Boys in the Band.

Christian first appeared on Days of Our Lives in 2018, where he portrayed an uncredited role known as "minion". In 2022, he was cast as TR Coates on Days of Our Lives, first appearing in the January 26, 2022, episode. Christian was cast following discussions with co-executive producer Albert Alarr. He presently resides in Boston, Massachusetts with his family, and attributes them for encouraging him to take on the role.

== Personal life ==
In 2002, Christian married Gail Samuel. In 2021, Samuel would become the first female president and CEO of Boston Symphony Orchestra. The couple welcomed their first child in the summer of 2005. They have two sons, Samuel and Orlando. Christian currently lives in Boston with his wife and sons.

== Filmography ==
=== Film ===
Year	Title	Role	Notes
1989	The January Man	Tim	
2004	Nine Lives	Ralph	
2009	Three Takes	Bradley	Short film
2009	Contradictions of the Heart	Ross	Direct-to-video film
2010	The Au Pairs	Mr. Dietrich	Short film
2019	Words to Live By	Larry	Short film
2020	Love & Orgasms	Charlie Gray	

=== Television ===
Year	Title	Role	Notes
1985	The Cosby Show	Mr. Robertson	Episode: "Vanessa's New Class"
1988	Tattingers	Oscar	Episode: "Pilot"
1989	Another World	Marshall Reed	Recurring role
1990	All My Children	Derek Frye	Series regular (1990–2005)
1997	Law & Order	Shawn Taitt	Episode: "Blood"
2001	Law & Order	Detective Regan	Episode: "Bronx Cheer"
1999	Spin City	Man	Episode: "Klumageddon (Part 1)"
2003	Malcolm in the Middle	Don	Episode: "Daycare"
2003	Without a Trace	Bernard	Episode: "The Bus"
2008	Without a Trace	Steve	Episode: "Closure"
2008	ER	Hayward	Episode: "…As the Day She Was Born"
2008	Moonlight	Ryan Gold	Episode: "Click"
2008	Prison Break	Middleton	Episode: "Safe & Sound"
2008	Hannah Montana	Edward Johnson	Episode: "We're All on This Date Together"
2008	Desperate Housewives	EMT #1	Episode: "Mirror, Mirror"
2009	Monk	Brett	Episode: "Mr. Monk Makes the Playoffs"
2011	I'm in the Band	Pilot	Episode: "Weasels in the House"
2017	Hand of God	Manny	Recurring role: 4 Episodes Episode: "Telling Me Your Dreams"; Episode: "The Last Thing Left"; Episode: "What a Man Can Be"; Episode: "He Must Be"
2017	A Neighbor's Deception	Dean O'Brien	Television film
2018	Days of Our Lives	Manny	Under-five
2022	Days of Our Lives	TR Coates	Series regular
2020	How to Get Away with Murder	DOJ Attorney	Episode: "Let's Hurt Him"
2020	Another Mother	Detective Cates	Television film
2020	The Bay	Dr. Marques Abraham	Episode: "A Pitched Battle"
2021	Good Girls	Store Owner	Episode: "The Banker"
