= Raven Bowens =

American actress

- Born: San Diego, California, U.S.
- Education: Canyon Hills High School
- Occupation: Actress
- Years active: 2013–present

Raven Bowens is an American actress. She is best known for playing the role of Chanel Dupree on the NBC and Peacock soap opera Days of Our Lives since 2021.

== Early life ==
Bowens was born in San Diego, California, and raised in Lincoln Park. She took dance classes at Boys & Girls Clubs and participated in local programs "6 to 6" and "Circle of Peace." Bowens and her friends took part in a multi-media program that included acting, comedy skits, news reports, and dramatic scenes.

Her boyfriend, a football player, encouraged her to pursue acting during her senior year of high school. However, after he died unexpectedly, Bowens was too grief stricken at the time to take his advice. She graduated from Canyon Hills High School (then known as Serra High School).

== Career ==
Bowens appeared in the 2013 horror film Delivery: The Beast Within. In 2016 she was cast as Ashley in Secret Diary of an American Cheerleader 4: Cheerleader Undercover, a pilot that wasn't produced.

She played Teasha Bivins in the BET Mini-Series The New Edition Story and Adria Biles in the Lifetime TV Movie The Simone Biles Story: Courage to Soar. She had a regular role as Savannah Peters on the Verizon go90 streaming series Mr. Student Body President.

Bowens has guest starred on All Rise, Future Man, and Insecure. She had a recurring role as Tilly on The Marvelous Mrs. Maisel.

She auditioned for the role of Trina Robinson on General Hospital, which went to Sydney Mikayla.

Since July 6, 2021, Bowens has played Chanel Dupree on Days of Our Lives, the daughter of Paulina Price (Jackée Harry). She replaced Precious Way in the role. She also played Chanel in Days of Our Lives: A Very Salem Christmas.

== Filmography ==
=== Film ===
Year	Title	Role	Notes
2013	Delivery: The Beast Within	Actress	
2018	Seize	Hannah	Short film
2021	Days of Our Lives: A Very Salem Christmas	Chanel Dupree	
2025	Girl in the Cellar	Rebecca	LMN movie

=== Television ===
Year	Title	Role	Notes
2016	Secret Diary of an American Cheerleader 4: Cheerleader Undercover	Ashley	Unaired pilot
2016–2018	Mr. Student Body President	Savannah Peters	24 episodes
2017	The New Edition Story	Teasha Bivins	TV Mini-Series, 2 episodes
2017	Future Man	Jennifer	Episode: "Herpe: Fully Loaded"
2018	Henry Danger	Missy	Episode: "Thumb War"
2018	The Simone Biles Story: Courage to Soar	Adria Biles	Television film
2018	Sick	Nicole	Television film
2019	Solve	Sydney	Episode: "The Birthday Card Killer"
2020	All Rise	Pamela 'Diamond' Pinafore	Episode: "The Tale of Three Arraignments"
2020	Insecure	Sharice	Episode: "Lowkey Thankful"
2021–present	Days of Our Lives	Chanel Dupree	Contract role
2022	The Marvelous Mrs. Maisel	Tilly	4 episodes
