= Diego Serrano =

Ecuadorian actor (born 1973)

- Born: February 5, 1973 (age 53); Quito, Ecuador
- Occupation: Actor

Diego Serrano (born February 5, 1973) is an Ecuadorian actor.

== Career ==
Serrano was born on February 5, 1973, in Quito, Ecuador. He has appeared on The Young and the Restless as Diego Guittierez (2001–02) and the long-running, defunct soap opera Another World as Tomas Rivera (1993–97). In 2000, he starred alongside star Jennifer Love Hewitt on the Fox television series Time of Your Life. He also appeared in the 2005 film The Mostly Unfabulous Social Life of Ethan Green playing Kyle Underhill, a professional baseball player who comes out as gay and authors an autobiography. Serrano played the role of Richard in the film The Ode (2008) based on the novel Ode to Lata by Ghalib Shiraz Dhalla. He also appeared as "Eddie Diaz" with Rosie Perez, Marianne Jean-Baptiste, and Tony Award winner Patti Lupone in Nancy Savoca's The 24 Hour Woman.

== Personal life ==
Serrano was in a long-term relationship with actress Cote de Pablo as of 2010, but they were reported as having broken up in June 2015.
