= Greg Vaughan =

American actor

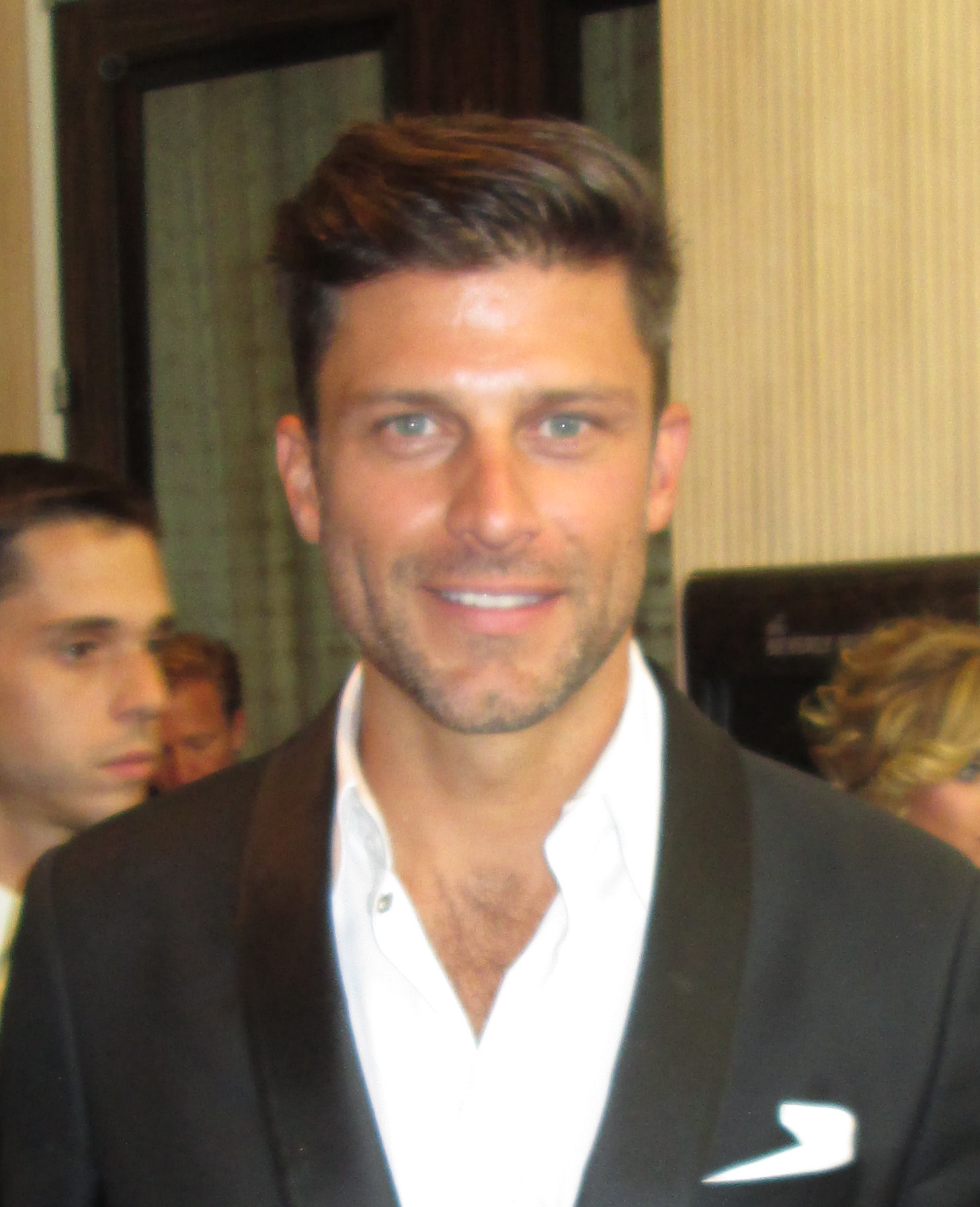
- Vaughan at the 31st Daytime Emmy Awards in May 2014
- Born: James Gregory Vaughan Jr. June 15, 1973 (age 53); Dallas, Texas, U.S.
- Years active: 1996–present
- Spouse: Touriya Haoud (m. 2006; div. 2016)
- Children: 3

James Gregory Vaughan Jr. (born June 15, 1973) is an American actor and former fashion model, known for his on and off appearances in roles on the soap operas The Young and the Restless (2002–03), General Hospital (2003–09), Days of Our Lives (2012–25), and Beyond the Gates (2025–). Vaughan also starred as Dan Gordon on the second season of the supernatural series Charmed (1999–2000). In 2016, Vaughan began starring in the Oprah Winfrey Network drama series Queen Sugar as Detective Calvin.

== Career ==
The actor and former male fashion model has starred in soap operas such as The Young and the Restless and General Hospital. To date, his best-known role is that of Lucky Spencer in the latter, which he played from 2003 to 2009.

At age 16, while getting a haircut, he learned of a "Back to School" modeling competition, and sent in some snapshots. He was selected as a finalist but did not win. However, the winner encouraged Vaughan to pursue modeling, and Vaughan signed up with a modeling agency.

Shortly after graduating from Mesquite High School, he was invited to Milan, Italy, where he modeled for designer Giorgio Armani for two and a half months. More campaigns followed, with designers such as Gianni Versace, Tommy Hilfiger, Banana Republic, and Ralph Lauren.

While modeling in Miami, Vaughan started to become dissatisfied with the modeling life, and decided to relocate to pursue his dream of becoming an actor, he then moved to Los Angeles. His first role was on Baywatch, as well as on the pilot for a 1996 Aaron Spelling series, Malibu Shores, that lead to his future appearances on Beverly Hills, 90210 and was a cast regular for the second season of Charmed.

His next major role was from 2002 to 2003 as Diego Guittierez in the daytime drama The Young and the Restless. When the character was written off the show, Vaughan got a call from the producers of General Hospital, who were seeking a new actor for the character of Lucky Spencer, son of the famous soap opera couple Luke and Laura. Vaughan was the first actor to portray Lucky as a full-fledged adult, with the part having been played by Jonathan Jackson and Jacob Young.

On June 7, 2006, Vaughan won the role of the new spokesperson for I Can't Believe It's Not Butter in a ceremony in New York. The contest was created to replace Fabio.

In 2007, Vaughan appeared on The Tyra Banks Show to help Tyra Banks through "soap opera school."

On September 28, 2009, Vaughan announced that he would exit the role of Lucky Spencer on General Hospital as the role had been recast with original portrayer Jonathan Jackson; he last aired on October 20 of that year.

In the July 16, 2012, edition of Soap Opera Digest, it was announced that Vaughan would join the NBC soap opera Days of Our Lives as Eric Brady, who was ordained as a priest before returning to Salem. He first aired on November 13. He departed the role in 2016, and returned from 2017 to 2020, briefly twice in 2021, and since 2022.

In July 2013, Vaughan appeared in "Second Chances", a Hallmark Original Movie, alongside Days co-star Alison Sweeney. The movie was filmed before Sweeney and Vaughn became siblings on Days of Our Lives. In October 2025, it was announced he had joined the cast of Beyond the Gates. He debuted in the role of Kial Rollins on December 8.

== Personal life ==
Vaughan married Dutch model and actress Touriya Haoud on June 4, 2006. The couple has three sons. During their marriage, they lived in Los Angeles, California and Charlotte, North Carolina. On April 14, 2014, Haoud and Vaughan announced their separation. Their children live with Vaughan in the United States and Haoud moved back to the Netherlands following their divorce.

On December 24, 2019, Vaughan announced his engagement to actress Angie Harmon. In July 2021, Harmon and Vaughan called off the engagement.

In 2024, Vaughan began dating model and actress Shanna Moakler.

== Filmography ==
Film
Year	Title	Role	Notes
1997	Poison Ivy: The New Seduction	Michael	Direct-to-video
1997	No Small Ways	—N/a	
1998	Stuart Bliss	Magazine stand cashier	
1998	Children of the Corn V: Fields of Terror	Tyrus	Direct-to-video
2002	For Mature Audiences Only	Sam	Short film
2011	Borderline Murder	Ray Sullivan	Television film
2011	Love's Christmas Journey	Aaron Davis	Television film
2011	Sebastian	Dr. David Zigler	
2013	Second Chances	Jeff Sinclair	Television film
2013	And Then There Was You	Corinth	
2013	Playdate	Ben	
2013	Someone to Love	Corinth	
2015	The Christmas Note	Kyle Daniels	Television film
2017	A Very Country Christmas	Billy Gunther	Television film
2017	Valentine's Again	Danny	Television film
2019	A Very Country Wedding	Billy Gunther	Television film
2021	Days of Our Lives: A Very Salem Christmas	Eric Brady	Peacock Original Movie

Television
Year	Title	Role	Notes
1996	Baywatch	Cowboy	Episode: "The Incident"
1996	Malibu Shores	Josh Walker	10 episodes Main role (Season 1)
1996–97	Beverly Hills, 90210	Cliff Yeager	6 episodes Guest role (Season 7)
1997	Buffy the Vampire Slayer	Richard Anderson	Episode: "Reptile Boy"
1998	The Love Boat: The Next Wave	Tom	Episode: "How Long Has This Been Going On?"
1998	Mortal Kombat: Konquest	Kebral	Episode: "Debt of the Dragon"
1998	Pacific Blue	Trent Spence	Episode: "Broken Dreams"
1999	Legacy	Tom Stanton	Episode: "Winner's Circle"
1999–2000	Charmed	Dan Gordon	18 episodes Main role (Season 2)
2000	Nash Bridges	Josh Avery	Episode: "Lap Dance"
2002	Glory Days	Lawyer	Episode: "Unaired Pilot"
2002	Will & Grace	Cute guy	Episode: "Dyeing Is Easy, Comedy Is Hard"
2002	Sabrina, the Teenage Witch	Peter	Episode: "The Arrangement"
2002–03	The Young and the Restless	Diego Guittierez	Regular role
2003	Still Standing	Trevor	Episode: "Still Scoring"
2003–09	General Hospital	Lucky Spencer	612 episodes Regular role
2010	90210	Kai	3 episodes
2010	The Closer	Mounted Officer Wagner	Episode: "An Ugly Game"
2012	GCB	Bill Vaughn	Episode: "Pilot"
2012–2025	Days of Our Lives	Eric Brady	Regular role: 2012–2020, 2022–2025; Recurring and guest role: 2020–2022, 2025
2015	Extant	Sexy man	Episode: "Change Scenario"
2016–17, 2019	Queen Sugar	Calvin	16 episodes Recurring role (Seasons 1–2,4)
2025–present	Beyond the Gates	Kial Rollins	Recurring role

== Awards and nominations ==
Year	Award	Category	Work	Result	Ref.
2003	Soap Opera Digest Award	Outstanding Newcomer	The Young and the Restless	Nominated	
2018	Daytime Emmy Award	Outstanding Supporting Actor in a Drama Series	Days of Our Lives	Won	

Preceded by Jacob Young	Lucky Spencer (role); 2003–09	Succeeded by Jonathan Jackson
Preceded by Jensen Ackles	Eric Brady (role); 2012–25	None
