= Arianne Zucker =

American actress and model

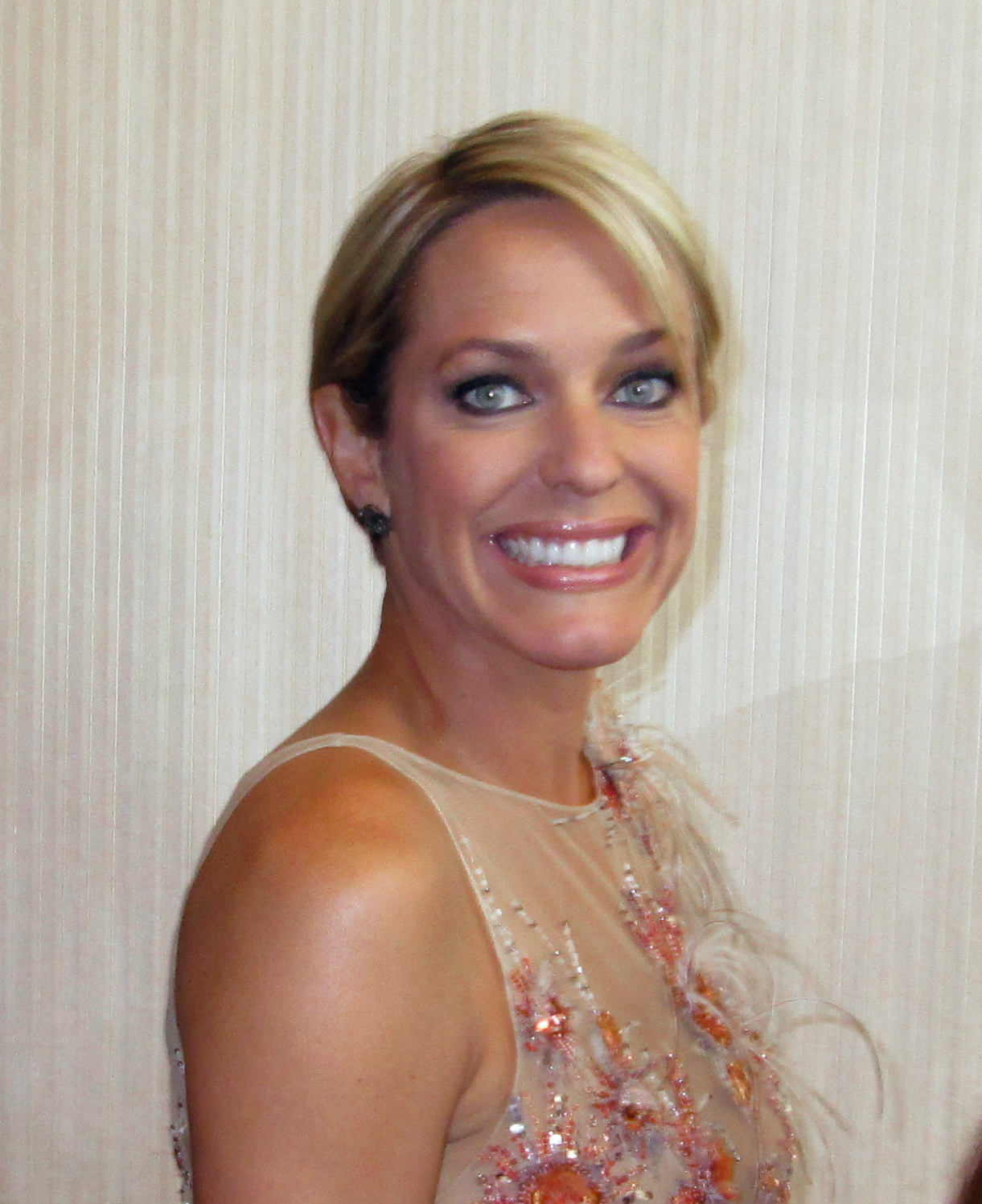
- Arianne Zucker at the 2014 Daytime Emmys
- Born: Arianne Bethene Zucker; June 3, 1974 (age 52); Northridge, California, U.S.
- Occupation: Actress
- Years active: 1998–present
- Spouses: Kyle Lowder (m. 2002; div. 2014) Shawn Christian (m. 2024)
- Children: 1

Arianne Bethene Zucker (born June 3, 1974) is an American actress and model. She is known for playing Nicole Walker on the NBC daytime soap opera Days of Our Lives since 1998.

== Early life ==
Zucker was born in Northridge, California, and raised in Chatsworth. Zucker's father is Christian, whereas her mother is Jewish. Her mother, Barbara, is a lab technologist and her father, Barry, is a plumber. She has an older brother, Todd.

== Career ==
Zucker began modeling at the age of 16 when she was discovered by a scout from It Models. Starting in Los Angeles, her career took her to locations around the world, including France, Japan, Australia and New York. She attended Chatsworth High School, graduating in 1992. While there, she was a cheerleader during her sophomore and junior years. She later described her cheerleading experience:

I was on junior varsity in 10th and 11th grade, and then I decided it wasn't for me. I was so tall and I wasn't one of "those girls". I made the team, but I didn't feel quite comfortable.

She appeared in several TV commercials, including national spots for Mazda and McDonald's. Settling in Los Angeles, she began studies as an actress at Los Angeles Pierce College. She was involved in several workshops that included her performances in Beth Henley's Crimes of the Heart and Neil Simon's The Last of the Red Hot Lovers. She continued her studies at the Howard Fine Studio, where she has been a student for many years. In February 1998, she auditioned for and won the role of Nicole Walker on Days of Our Lives. In March 2017, Zucker announced she would be leaving Days of Our Lives. Zucker made a brief appearance on the show in 2018, and then returned again in 2019.

In a February 2024 wrongful termination lawsuit filing, accusing producers/production of retaliating against her for a sexual harassment complaint she made against co-executive producer/director Albert Alarr (who was fired in August 2023 following an internal investigation), it was announced Zucker's deal with the soap was not renewed. In October 2025, a settlement was filed in Los Angeles County Superior Court.

== Personal life ==
In 2002, Zucker married actor Kyle Lowder, who co-starred with her on Days of Our Lives as Brady Black. After five years of marriage, they separated briefly in August 2007, then reconciled in March 2008. They have one child. In March 2014, Zucker and Lowder confirmed they were divorced. In 2014, Zucker began a relationship with former co-star and love interest on Days, Shawn Christian. The two became engaged in June 2021 and were married on August 17, 2024.

In October 2016, Zucker made headlines because she appeared in the Donald Trump Access Hollywood tape. Zucker responded to the controversy by issuing a statement, "It's not about me".

== Filmography ==
Film roles
Year	Title	Role	Notes
2001	Looking for Bobby D	Shannon	
2009	The Last Resort	Jessica	
2013	The Contractor	Kate	Direct-to-video film; also known as Unfinished Betrayal
2016	Killer Assistant	Suzanne Austin	
2021	Days of Our Lives: A Very Salem Christmas	Nicole Walker	Peacock Original Movie
2023	Monsters of California	Leah	

Television roles
Year	Title	Role	Notes
1998–2006, 2008–2024	Days of Our Lives	Nicole Walker	Main role
2006	CSI: Miami	Brenda Collett	Episode: "Dead Air"
2013	DeVanity	Julia Regis	Episode: "Baby Bumps"
2016	Killer Assistant	Suzanne	Television film
2017	Ex-Wife Killer	Laura	Television film
2017	Web Cam Girls	Rachel	Television film
2018	Mommy Be Mine	Liane	Television film
2018	Babysitter's Nightmare	Audra	Television film
2018	His Perfect Obsession	Allison Jones	Television film

== Awards and nominations ==
List of acting awards and nominations
Year	Award	Category	Title	Result	Ref.
2001	Soap Opera Digest Award	Outstanding Villainess	Days of Our Lives	Won	
2005	Soap Opera Digest Award	Favorite Villainess	Days of Our Lives	Nominated	
2010	Daytime Emmy Award	Outstanding Supporting Actress in a Drama Series	Days of Our Lives	Nominated	
2013	Daytime Emmy Award	Outstanding Supporting Actress in a Drama Series	Days of Our Lives	Nominated	
2014	Daytime Emmy Award	Outstanding Lead Actress in a Drama Series	Days of Our Lives	Nominated	
2020	Daytime Emmy Award	Outstanding Lead Actress in a Drama Series	Days of Our Lives	Nominated	
2022	Daytime Emmy Award	Outstanding Lead Actress in a Drama Series	Days of Our Lives	Nominated	
