= Diego Guittierez =

Fictional character from the American CBS soap opera The Young and the Restless

- The Young and the Restless character
- Portrayed by: Diego Serrano (2001–02); Greg Vaughan (2002–03)
- Duration: 2001–2003
- First appearance: December 18, 2001
- Last appearance: February 17, 2003
- Introduced by: Kay Alden; Trent Jones
In-universe information
- Occupation: Waiter
- Father: Vincente Guittierez
- Mother: Adela Guitterez
- Brothers: Raul Guittierez; Dante Guittierez
- Nephews: Joshua Marsino (adoptive)

Diego Guittierez is a fictional character from the American soap opera The Young and the Restless. He was originated by Diego Serrano on December 18, 2001, before being replaced by former model Greg Vaughan in April 2002. Vaughan was let go as well, and the character departed on February 17, 2003.

== Casting and creation ==
Diego Serrano's casting for the part was announced on October 26, 2001. Serrano was previously known for his portrayal of Tomas Rivera on the NBC Daytime soap opera, Another World. Diego made his first on-screen appearance during the episode dated December 18, 2001. On March 17, 2002, it was announced that Serrano was to exit the role, and his departure was "storyline dictated". Seven days later, it was announced that former model Greg Vaughan was Serrano's replacement. Vaughan was known for playing Dan Gordon on the serial drama series Charmed from 1999 to 2000. The recasting, according to executive producers, was due to a "new direction" they were taking with the character.

Serrano exited on April 26, 2002 with Vaughan debuting four days later on April 30. In December, it was announced that Vaughan had been let go from The Young and the Restless. His exit was reportedly due to a "lack of storyline". A spokesperson for the soap opera said "Greg's a fine actor. And we thank him for all the contributions he's made to the show. It was the end of contract and end of storyline". His last airdate was February 17, 2003.

== Character development ==
When the casting call for the character was issued, Diego was originally named Dante; but Dante was later revealed to be his brother. He was penned as a "gorgeous, Hispanic male" in his mid twenties. He's "genuine and caring" but has learned to "sail through life on his good looks". He was introduced as the brother of another character, Raul Guittierez (David Lago). Candace Havens of Zap2it called Diego "sexy". Vaughan commented that Diego's character has developed and come a long way. He stated "Diego has come a long way. I find him very very passionate about his family and his loved ones." The actor noted Diego to be "selfless and willing" to put his life "on the line to make life better or safer for someone else".

On Vaughan's first episode on the show, Diego slept with Sharon Newman (Sharon Case). Sharon was married to Nick Newman (Joshua Morrow) at the time. Sharon had believed that Nick cheated on her, which he didn't, and she became guilt ridden. Diego "urged" Sharon not to tell Nick about their lovemaking because of the ramifications it could cause where her kids with Nick were concerned. Intrigued by Diego, Nick's sister Victoria (Heather Tom) took an interest in him and they began having a romance of their own. On the night Victoria and Diego told each other they loved one another for the first time, Nick found out about his sleeping with Sharon and beat up Diego. The Newmans began to hate Diego, but Victoria forgave him. Diego was later beaten up by thugs.

Despite the character's duration on the soap having eventually come to a quick close, on what was to be expected from Diego, Vaughan said "I think there is a lot more in store for him, and we may begin to see a bit of a darker side of him. After being pushed around and beaten up, he finally retaliates, and it's something I've been waiting to see from him". After Diego's obsession for revenge over the thugs got out of hand, Victoria dumped him and he left town.

== Storylines ==
After being absent from his family's lives for a long time, Diego Guittierez came to Genoa City to find out more about his brother Raul's diabetes problems. Raul refused to let Diego help him out when his grades started going down. Diego struggled to get around town at first, but he found help from Larry Warton (David Fralick) in getting an apartment, while married couple Nick and Sharon Newman gave him a job at their coffeehouse and working on the Newman ranch.

Diego regularly found himself comforting Sharon, who was having trouble dealing with her problems. Her marriage to Nick suffered when she lost a baby and caught him kissing another woman, so she wanted something more than just comfort from Diego, but he refused to do anything and said he was only her friend nothing more. However, Diego and Sharon ended up sleeping together, then were left guilty when Nick decided to work on his marriage to Sharon.

Nick's sister Victoria Newman was confused about the friendship between Sharon and Diego, so she decided to pretend to be interested in Diego in order to find out more about the situations. She, however, ended up falling for him and they started a relationship. Just as they were ready to confess their love for each other, Nick found out about Sharon sleeping with Diego and he beat up Diego, then cheated on Sharon again. Victoria broke up with Diego. Diego desperately tried to convince the entire family that the night he spent with Sharon meant nothing to him and that he wasn't the one who initiated it. Victoria believed him and they hooked up again.

Victoria's family wouldn't tolerate her being with Diego, so she moved out of the ranch, and the couple moved into a hotel together. Victoria's father Victor Newman (Eric Braeden) tried to pay off Diego to leave town, but he wouldn't accept it. Victor gave Diego money, which was later stolen by two thugs who beat up Diego. Diego recovered from his injuries and was keen on getting revenge for the crime against him, completely ignoring the fact that Victoria wanted to lead a normal life with him. Diego hatched a plot with Larry to get revenge on the thugs and it worked. Victoria was upset over how different Diego had become and they split, causing Diego to leave Genoa City behind.
