= Brady Black =

- Days of Our Lives character
- Eric Martsolf as Brady Black
- Portrayed by: Kyle Lowder (2000–2005); Eric Martsolf (2008–present); (and others)
- Duration: 1992–2005; 2008–present
- First appearance: May 19, 1992
- Created by: Richard J. Allen and Beth Milstein
- Introduced by: Ken Corday and Tom Langan (1992, 2000); Ken Corday and Gary Tomlin (2008)
- Spin-off appearances: Days of Our Lives: A Very Salem Christmas (2021)
In-universe information
- Other names: Brady Kiriakis; Brady Victor Black; Freddie Smith
- Occupation: Businessman; Music manager
- Parents: John Black; Isabella Toscano
- Stepmother: Susan Banks (1997); Marlena Evans (1999–present); Hope Williams Brady (1999–2012) (Note: Despite the two retcons: The discovery of Alex North's marriage to Marlena and John and Hope's marriage in 2012. John and Marlena were married multiple times.)
- Half-brothers: Paul Narita; Eric Brady (step)
- Half-sisters: Belle Black; Sami Brady (step)
- Spouse: Chloe Lane (2005–2008); Theresa Donovan (2014)
- Sons: Tate Black
- Daughters: Rachel Black
- Grandfathers: Timothy Robicheaux; Victor Kiriakis; Leopold Alamain (adoptive)
- Grandmothers: Maude Robicheaux; Loretta Toscano; Philomena Alamain (adoptive)
- Uncles: Bo Brady; Xander Kiriakis; Philip Kiriakis; Lawrence Alamain (adoptive)
- Aunts: Marina Toscano
- Nephews: Will Horton (step); Johnny DiMera (step)
- Nieces: Claire Brady; Allie Horton (step); Sydney DiMera (step)
- First cousins: Shawn-Douglas Brady; Chelsea Brady; Zack Brady; Ciara Brady; Victoria Kiriakis; Tyler Kiriakis; Nicholas Alamain (adoptive)
- Other relatives: Carrie Brady; Justin Kiriakis; Sonny Kiriakis

Brady Black is a fictional character from Days of Our Lives, an American soap opera on the Peacock streaming service. Formerly portrayed by Kyle Lowder, the role of Brady has been portrayed by Eric Martsolf since 2008. Martsolf won a Daytime Emmy Award for Outstanding Supporting Actor in a Drama Series in 2014 for his role as Brady.

Brady is the son of John Black and Isabella Toscano, and the grandson of crime boss Victor Kiriakis.

== Casting ==
The character was initially played by Alex, Max, and Dash Lucero from May 1992 to September 1994, and subsequently by Eric and Brandon Billings from October 1994 to July 1999. When news broke that the character of Eric Brady would be written out due to Jensen Ackles departing the series, Ken Corday and NBC made the decision to bring a SORAS'd Brady Black to help fill the void of the main focus and be a young hero. The character was then re-introduced as an adult with actor Kyle Lowder who debuted on August 21, 2000.

In September 2005, it was announced that NBC had passed on renewing Lowder's contract with Days of our Lives. He last aired September 15, 2005.

In August 2008, it was announced that Brady would return to the series. Former Passions actor Eric Martsolf was cast to bring the character back to Salem. He first aired in the role on November 13, 2008. In May 2020, Wes Ramsey revealed he previously auditioned for the role of Brady prior to Martsolf's casting.

== Storylines ==
=== Backstory ===
Brady is born onscreen in 1992 to John Black and his wife, Isabella. Sadly, Isabella dies soon after, leaving John to raise Brady on his own. John later marries Marlena Evans, and the two raise Brady and their daughter, Belle, together. Eventually, Brady is sent to a private school away from Salem.

=== 2000–2005 ===
Brady returns to Salem as a spoiled, disrespectful college student loner who lashes out at everyone, especially Marlena. As a result, he is distrusted by many, including his uncle, Philip Kiriakis, who considers him a freak. However, Chloe Lane, Philip's girlfriend, sees a glimmer of her once ostracized-self in Brady and develops a friendship with him, which eventually turns into something more. The couple marry in 2005, and move to Vienna. By then, Brady had long-since resolved his animosity towards Marlena, becoming a loving son and brother, as well as a responsible, promising executive in his father's fashion and publishing company, Basic Black.

After leaving Salem, Brady becomes addicted to drugs. Blaming Chloe for his addiction, Brady's grandfather Victor Kiriakis kidnaps him and places him in a drug rehabilitation clinic. Brady blames Chloe for his addiction and subsequently files for divorce.

=== 2008–present ===
Brady returns to Salem in November 2008 after beating his addiction. Divorced from Chloe, he comes back to Salem to talk things out with her and reunite with his troubled family. Brady and Chloe eventually come to terms with the end of their marriage and decide to remain friends. Brady sensitively deals with a father who does not remember him. Supporting Marlena in her quest to help John regain his memory, Brady foils the plot for revenge leveled against his stepmother, and masterminded by none other than his father's therapist, Dr. Charlotte Taylor. Brady also makes peace with his old flame, Nicole Walker, who was pregnant at the time with EJ DiMera's child. As a peace offering, going through his own recovery, he offers to be her shoulder if she needs help with not drinking while carrying the child. When Nicole suffers a miscarriage, she confides in Brady about it, deeming she would continue to fake her pregnancy, something Brady was not taking kindly to. Brady soon enters into a relationship with Arianna Hernandez, the sister of Rafe Hernandez. After proposing to Arianna, she is framed by Nicole for the Salem muggings. Unable to convince Brady of her innocence, she breaks off the engagement. Determined to reconcile her relationship with Brady, Nicole begins to romance him and they rekindle their broken relationship. Brady soon begins drinking once again, providing worry for his close family and friends. Brady's life continues to spiral downward when Arianna is killed in a hit-and-run car accident. Nicole and Brady subsequently end their relationship once again when Nicole makes an arrangement with EJ, to get visitation with his daughter, Sydney. But when EJ cheats on Nicole with her sister Taylor, Nicole and Brady realize they both still love each other, and are reunited. However, the relationship ends when both of them feel like they have "fizzled out", and they decide to be good friends as Nicole vows to be independent. However, Nicole is eventually reunited with EJ.

In 2011, Titan acquires Mad World Cosmetics, and with it comes the feisty CEO of the company, Madison James. After fighting the sexual tension between them, Brady and Madison eventually sleep together and begin a relationship. Brady also reconciles with his father, John, who returns to town. In early 2012, Brady decides to leave Titan to go back into business with his father at Basic Black. After proposing and it being turned down, Madison's husband Ian McAllister arrives in town, causing a further rift between Madison and Brady. By August 2012, they reconcile and plan to marry. On the day of their wedding, Brady leaves to rescue his friend, Melanie Jonas, who is trapped in the tunnels beneath Salem. An explosion occurs, trapping them inside. They managed to escape, but Brady found out that Madison was killed in the explosion, and he was devastated. In 2013, he starts dating Kristen DiMera and becomes entangled in Kristen's twisted revenge plot against John and Marlena. Brady and Kristen are almost married when he finds out that his fiancée raped his step-brother Eric Brady; he breaks up with her and starts drinking again. Brady hates his step-brother for sleeping with Kristen.

A few months later in 2014, he meets Theresa Donovan, whom he doesn't like at first, but he eventually ends up sleeping and getting high with her, much to his loved ones' disapproval, thinking she's using him for money and is a bad influence on him. After months of dating, Brady and Theresa take a trip to Las Vegas, where he gets drunk and marries her. Once they get back to Salem, John confronts Theresa leading for her to hit him in the back of the head with a fire poker and sending him into a coma. Theresa blames Brady for the incident and due to his not being able to remember anything he believes the story but charges are not pressed against Brady. Brady gets sober and gets an annulment from Theresa; however, when Kristen comes back it sends him right back into the arms of Theresa. Kristen then begins suggesting that it was Theresa who hit John which Brady deems ridiculous and thinks Kristen is simply jealous of Theresa. Kristen then gets a drug which takes John out of his coma, where he backs up Theresa's story because he wants to keep Brady away from Kristen. Brady later finds out the truth after walking in on a conversation between John and Theresa and proceeds to dump Theresa. However just as he began to cut Theresa out of his life she announces to him that she is pregnant and he is the father. They go and get a pregnancy test done at the hospital where it is revealed that Theresa wasn't pregnant much to the shock of Theresa.

Soon after, Brady's old friend Melanie Jonas comes back and starts a rivalry with Theresa much to the disdain of Brady and Daniel. Brady then begins a relationship with Melanie in which she figures out that Theresa really was pregnant, and that Kristen had stolen the embryo before she left town and gave birth to the child, naming it Christopher. When Brady and Theresa are reunited with their baby, they change his name to Tate. After Brady allows Theresa and Tate to move into the Kiriakis Mansion, he begins to fall for Theresa, to the disappointment of Victor. Brady ends up leaving Titan and he, Theresa and Tate move into a townhouse, and he becomes engaged to Theresa. On New Year's Eve of 2015, Brady, his brother Eric, Jennifer Horton, and Daniel Jonas are involved in a tragic car accident due to Eric driving drunk. The accident leaves Daniel brain dead, and Brady in need of a heart transplant. With Maggie's permission, Daniel is taken off of life support and his heart is donated to Brady. Eric is later sent to prison for causing Daniel's death. In August 2016, Tate is kidnapped, but is later found and the kidnapper is revealed to be Kate Roberts, after Victor was accused of being the kidnapper.

Later, Theresa leaves Brady and Tate for Crime Lord El Fideo in order to protect them. After her return, Theresa got sole custody of Tate and then left Salem with Tate to go to California to take care of her mother Kimberly after her cancer return.

After learning that Kristen is alive and well, who returns to Salem donning a mask, disguising herself as Nicole Walker (Arianne Zucker). She is helped, once again, by Xander Kiriakis (Paul Telfer) in carrying out her plan, which involves trying to seduce Brady while also using Nicole's identity to manipulate Stefan into giving her a place in the family business. Kristen talks her brother Tony, who is alive and still in love with his former wife Anna (Leann Hunley), into marrying her as Nicole in a scheme to take back DiMera Enterprises from Stefan (Brandon Barash) and Gabi Hernandez (Camila Banus). Her scheme and true identity is exposed at John and Marlena's wedding anniversary celebration. While in custody, Kristen admits to Brady that Nicole and her daughter Holly are alive. After making a deal with the D.A., Kristen is set free. She once again sets her sights on getting back with Brady. Kristen discovers that Sarah Horton (Linsey Godfrey) is pregnant and has decided to have an abortion. With the assistance of Dr. Rolf and Xander, she decides to steal Sarah's embryo and implant it in herself, in an attempt to pass the baby off as her own with Brady. Rolf informs Kristen that she is already pregnant after sleeping with Brady while impersonating Nicole, thus making the procedure on Sarah both unnecessary and impossible. Months later, the newborn baby dies, unaware that his newborn daughter Rachel Isabella, who was named after both Kristen's mother Rachel Blake and his mother Isabella Toscano was switched at birth by his cousin Xander under orders from his grandfather Victor to spare the knowledge that his wife Maggie Horton is responsible for the deaths of Adrienne Johnson and her own granddaughter: the real Mackenzie, Rachel is currently being raised as Mackenzie Horton. A year later, Brady was fired from Titan after the death of his daughter Rachel and Kristen left Salem. Brady is currently working for Basic Black with Nicole. Brady is unaware that his baby is alive and has developed cancer and will need a bone marrow transplant from her parents. Mackenzie's life is saved when Gabi donates her bone marrow to escape a prison sentence, but Kristen does not learn the truth until Nicole conducts her own investigation; Nicole admits that as much as she hates Kristen, she also knows a mother's pain of being separated from her child. After finding out his daughter is alive, Brady realizes that his grandfather Victor and his cousin Xander were behind the baby switch that cause Sarah to kidnap Rachel and flee to her cousin Abigail and Chad's apartment in Paris. After learning that Kristen stabbed Victor, Brady took the blame in order to protect her and went to jail. Kristen later tells Lani the truth about Victor's stabbing. Later, Kristen receive a phone call from Rex Brady (Lowder) and with the help of her nephew and Lani's brother Theo Carver (Kyler Pettis), she learns that Rachel and Sarah are in Paris by tracking Rex's phone.

After getting Rachel back, he deals Kristen and her schemes. He breaks it off with her for good after she poses as Susan Banks in order escape her jail sentence. Around this time, he began rekindling his relationship with Chloe much to the chagrin of Philip. After Philip leaves Salem, Brady and Chloe cement their relationship.

== Reception ==
Martsolf won the Outstanding Supporting Actor in a Drama Series accolade at the 2014 Daytime Emmy Awards for his portrayal of Brady. In 2020, Charlie Mason from Soaps She Knows placed Brady at #34 on his list of the 35 most memorable characters from Days of Our Lives, saying that "Eric Martsolf’s alter ego is, in short, the perfect soap character: a basically decent fellow who is drawn to anything — and anyone — that is bad for him."
