= Eric Martsolf =

American actor (born 1971)

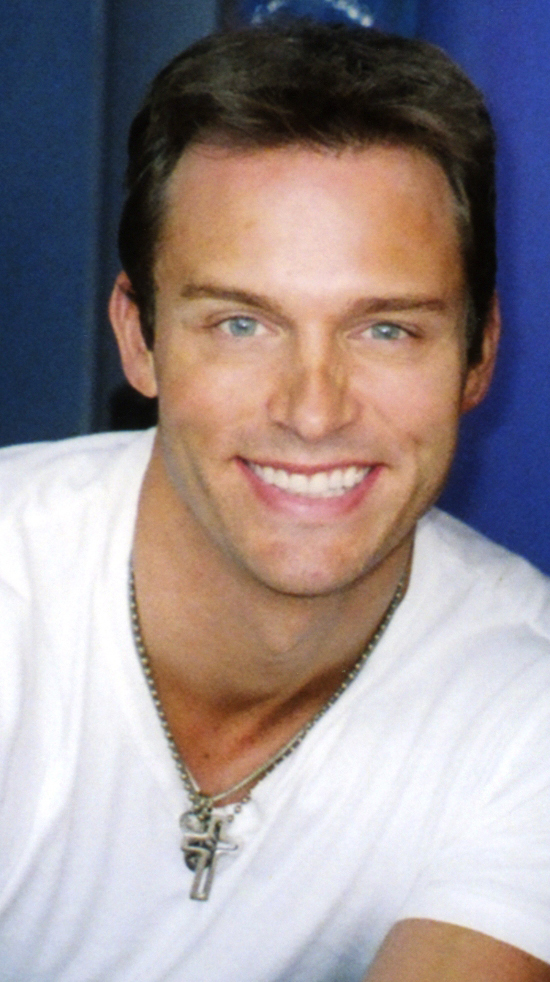
- Martsolf in November 2008
- Born: July 27, 1971 (age 54); Harrisburg, Pennsylvania, U.S.
- Occupation: Actor
- Years active: 2001–present
- Spouse: Lisa Kouchak (2003–present)
- Children: 2
- Website: http://www.ericmartsolf.com

Eric Martsolf (born July 27, 1971) is an American television actor. Since November 2008, he has played the role of Brady Black on the NBC soap opera Days of Our Lives for which he won a Daytime Emmy in 2014. He also played the role of Ethan Winthrop in the NBC soap opera Passions from 2002 to 2008.

== Background ==
Martsolf sang on a Hawaiian cruise ship and has modeled for over 50 designers, companies, and businesses. He was a radio broadcaster for WDCV 88.3 FM and was a singer/dancer at Hersheypark in Hershey, Pennsylvania for four years and also worked and performed at Dollywood in Pigeon Forge, Tennessee. He has a degree in Political Science from Dickinson College. He has been an Assistant Director and a Guest Artist for Children's Theatre Experience.

== Career ==
Martsolf portrayed Ethan Winthrop on NBC's daytime soap opera Passions from July 2002 (succeeding original portrayer Travis Schuldt) until the series' cancellation in August 2008. Martsolf had auditioned for the role of Ethan before the show began. Before he was cast as Ethan, he was previously on the show for one episode as a cop. He was voted favorite actor on Passions for more than 80 weeks in a row in Soap Opera Digest.

Martsolf made his first appearance in the role of Brady Black on Days of Our Lives on November 13, 2008. The character had previously been portrayed by Kyle Lowder until 2005. In 2014, he won a Daytime Emmy Award for Outstanding Supporting Actor in a Drama Series for his portrayal of Brady Black. He was nominated again for the same award in 2019.

Between 2010 and 2012, Martsolf made three appearances as Marcus Dunne on the teen drama web series Miss Behave, which also featured former Days of Our Lives performers Jillian Clare, Darin Brooks, and Patrika Darbo.

He also appeared in season 10, episode 18 of Smallville in 2011, playing the character Booster Gold.

== Personal life ==
Martsolf met his wife Lisa Kouchak doing musical theater together and married on October 10, 2003. Their twin sons, Mason Alan and Chase Evan, were born on April 7, 2006.

== Filmography ==
| Year | Title | Role | Notes |
|---|---|---|---|
| 2001 | The Cheater | Brad | |
| 2002–2008 | Passions | Ethan Winthrop | July 8, 2002—August 7, 2008 |
| 2002 | The Other Half | Himself | Episode date: September 10, 2002 |
| 2003 | Spanish Fly | Brick Hauser | |
| 2003–2004 | SoapTalk | Himself | Episode dates: December 23, 2003 and April 21–22, 2004 |
| 2004 | Street Smarts | Himself | Episode date: November 23, 2004 |
| 2005 | Starting Over | Himself | Episode: "Passion for the Game" |
| 2005 | Diva Dog: Pit Bull on Wheels | Himself | Guest star |
| 2007 | Passions Live! | Himself | |
| 2008– | Days of Our Lives | Brady Black | November 13, 2008–present |
| 2008 | NCIS | Paul Harris | Episode: "Collateral Damage" |
| 2009 | Four Steps | Clive | |
| 2010–2012 | Miss Behave | Marcus Dunne | |
| 2011 | Smallville | Michael Jon Carter/Booster Gold | |
| 2014 | Extant | B.E.N. | Voice only |
| 2021 | Days of Our Lives: A Very Salem Christmas | Brady Black | Peacock Original Movie |
