= Albert Alarr =

American television soap opera director

Albert Alarr (born March 30, 1956) is an American television soap opera director and producer. His role as producer at Days of Our Lives came under intense scrutiny in the wake of reports of possible on-set misconduct. It was confirmed on August 4, 2023, that he had exited the series.

== Producing credits ==
"The Break Up Guy"

- Executive Producer (2009)

"Loungitude"

- Co-Executive Producer, Corday Productions (2007)

"Days of Our Lives"

- Asst. Producer (2005–2009)
- Producer (2011 – July 31, 2015)
- Co-Executive Producer (August 3, 2015 – January 26, 2024)

"Days of Our Lives: Last Blast Reunion"

- Executive Producer (2019–2020)

"Days of Our Lives: Beyond Salem"

- Co-Executive Producer (2021–2022)

== Directing credits ==
Port Charles

- Director (entire run, 1997–2003)

All My Children

- Occasional Director (2002–2003)

Days of Our Lives

- Director (since March 11, 2003-Jan. 30, 2024)

The Young and the Restless

- Occasional Director (since March 3, 2011-Feb. 21, 2013)

Beacon Hill (web series)

- Director (2014)

== Awards and nominations ==
Daytime Emmy Award

- Nominated, 2006, Directing Team, Days of our Lives

Directors Guild of America Award

- Nominated, 2005, Directing, Days of our Lives
- Nominated, 1999, Directing, Days of our Lives
