= List of 9-1-1 episodes =

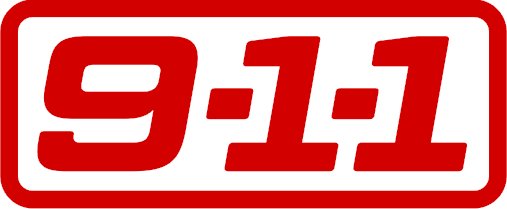

9-1-1 is an American procedural drama television series created by Ryan Murphy, Brad Falchuk, and Tim Minear for Fox. The series follows the lives of Los Angeles first responders: police officers, paramedics, firefighters, and dispatchers. 9-1-1 is a joint production between Reamworks, Ryan Murphy Television, and 20th Television.

9-1-1's first season premiered on January 3, 2018. Due to the COVID-19 pandemic, season four was shortened to 14 episodes and its premiere delayed until January 18, 2021. Fox renewed the series for a sixth season on May 16, 2022; it premiered on September 19. This was its final season on the network as Fox canceled the series in May 2023. ABC picked up the series next and renewed it for a seventh season. The season premiere was delayed to March 14, 2024, due to the 2023 Writers Guild of America strike, which also caused the season to be shortened to 10 episodes. ABC renewed the series for an eighth season that April; it premiered on September 26. On April 3, 2025, the series was renewed for a ninth season, which premiered on October 9. A tenth season renewal was announced in March 2026 which premiered on October 15, 2026.

As of November 19, 2026, 148 episodes of 9-1-1 have aired, currently in its tenth season.

== Series overview ==
Season	Episodes	Originally released			Rank	Viewership (millions)
Season	Episodes	First released	Last released	Network	Rank	Viewership (millions)
1	10	January 3, 2018	March 21, 2018	Fox	21	10.75
2	18	September 23, 2018	May 13, 2019	Fox	28	9.86
3	18	September 23, 2019	May 11, 2020	Fox	15	10.42
4	14	January 18, 2021	May 24, 2021	Fox	11	9.62
5	18	September 20, 2021	May 16, 2022	Fox	18	8.12
6	18	September 19, 2022	May 15, 2023	Fox	19	7.12
7	10	March 14, 2024	May 30, 2024	ABC	22	6.67
8	18	September 26, 2024	May 15, 2025	ABC	8	10.87
9	18	October 9, 2025	May 7, 2026	ABC	14	9.40
10	TBA	October 15, 2026	TBA	ABC	TBA	TBA

== Episodes ==
=== Season 1 (2018) ===
No. overall	No. in season	Title	Directed by	Written by	Original release date	Prod. code	U.S. viewers (millions)
1	1	"Pilot"	Bradley Buecker	Ryan Murphy & Brad Falchuk and Tim Minear	January 3, 2018	1LAY01	6.83
Los Angeles emergency first responders and dispatchers must balance the pressures of their respective jobs with their personal lives, from 9-1-1 operator Abby Clark's mother having dementia to police sergeant Athena Grant's husband Michael deciding to come out to their children after coming to terms with being gay. Rookie firefighter Evan "Buck" Buckley learns to appreciate the meaning of the job.
2	2	"Let Go"	Gwyneth Horder-Payton	Ryan Murphy & Brad Falchuk and Tim Minear	January 10, 2018	1LAY02	5.55
A failed rescue from a roller coaster leaves Buck traumatized. Athena and Henrietta "Hen" Wilson respond to a dog attack, which Athena later discovers is actually a home invasion robbery. Abby makes an on-the-phone connection with Buck. Athena arrives home and finds that her daughter May has overdosed.
3	3	"Next of Kin"	Barbara Brown	John J. Gray	January 17, 2018	1LAY03	6.21
The team is tested when Howie "Chimney" Han is critically injured in a car accident after a heated argument with Captain Robert "Bobby" Nash. Tatianna, Chimney's girlfriend, refuses to see Chimney in the hospital. Athena learns the reason for her daughter's suicide attempt and takes matters into her own hands.
4	4	"Worst Day Ever"	Bradley Buecker	Zachary Reiter	January 24, 2018	1LAY04	6.57
A plane crash into the ocean calls out the entire team. Athena takes drastic action to protect her daughter and, in doing so, is confined to desk duty. Bobby relapses into his alcoholism. Abby deals with a serious crisis involving her mother.
5	5	"Point of Origin"	Gwyneth Horder-Payton	Erica L. Anderson	January 31, 2018	1LAY05	6.21
A building collapses during a big Hindu wedding. Hen's convict ex-girlfriend, Eva Mathis, asks for her help getting parole, upsetting Karen, Hen's wife. Abby tries to find her missing mother with Buck's help, finally finding her thanks to some unlikely assistance. Bobby tells a priest how he accidentally killed his family five years before when, under the effects of oxycodone and alcohol, he forgot to turn off a propane space heater which malfunctioned and caused his building to burn down.
6	6	"Heartbreaker"	Bradley Buecker	Matthew Hodgson	February 7, 2018	1LAY06	6.64
A surprise marriage proposal on a Cessna goes awry. Buck invites Abby to Chimney's welcome back party at the firehouse. On Valentine's Day, Bobby and Chimney pull holiday duty so Buck can go on his first date with Abby, but the date goes awry when he chokes on some bread and she has to ask 911 for help performing an emergency tracheotomy. After she races to deliver an organ for transplant, Athena has to deal with an unhinged woman who murdered her cheating boyfriend.
7	7	"Full Moon (Creepy AF)"	Maggie Kiley	Adam Penn	February 28, 2018	1LAY07	5.95
A full moon looms over Los Angeles, putting superstitious first responders on high alert. Bobby and Buck respond to a call when a woman goes into labor during her yoga class. Hen gets too close for comfort with Eva, while Abby helps solve a mystery after a 911 call turns deadly.
8	8	"Karma's a Bitch"	Barbara Brown	Kristen Reidel	March 7, 2018	1LAY08	6.05
The firefighting team deals with several calls that lead to backfiring results. Meanwhile, Bobby donates blood at a blood drive, only to find out that he has a unique blood type that could save lives. Athena moves forward with her divorce following a heart-to-heart with her children. Abby and Buck take their relationship to the next level. Hen's infidelity comes to light.
9	9	"Trapped"	Gwyneth Horder-Payton	Story by : Adam Glass; Teleplay by : Aristotle Kousakis	March 14, 2018	1LAY09	6.55
The team gets calls from a homeless man stuck in a garbage truck after falling asleep in a dumpster and a mother and a son trapped inside a flooding elevator. Meanwhile, Buck begins to have doubts about his relationship with Abby and Hen continues to deal with the ramifications of her cheating. Also, Athena gets into an embarrassing situation while on a date.
10	10	"A Whole New You"	Bradley Buecker	Ryan Murphy & Brad Falchuk and Tim Minear	March 21, 2018	1LAY10	6.63
The team deals with a reported "death" at a psychic parlor; the victim later awakens at the morgue and reveals that he suffers from a disease in which he is paralyzed awake. They later respond to a motorcycle accident in which the victim's body has been severed in two, bringing Bobby and Athena closer together. Meanwhile, Buck's identity gets stolen through a series of social media accounts but, due to certain circumstances, he deals with the "catfisher" more sympathetically than expected. Following her mother's death, Abby makes a decision to leave Los Angeles and travel to Ireland to fulfill her mother's goals. Hen reaches out to her wife to try to make amends, while Bobby and Athena go on a first date.

=== Season 2 (2018–19) ===
No. overall	No. in season	Title	Directed by	Written by	Original release date	Prod. code	U.S. viewers (millions)
11	1	"Under Pressure"	Gwyneth Horder-Payton	Tim Minear & Brad Falchuk	September 23, 2018	2LAY01	9.83
New firefighter Eddie Diaz joins the 118, quickly becoming the object of Buck's rivalry. Buck's estranged sister Maddie moves to L.A. and admits she has left her abusive husband. Emergencies include a tour bus crashing in Hollywood, pressure cookers exploding in a restaurant, and a steam pipe explosion. Bobby and Athena have their first crisis as a couple, while the male firefighters of the 118 compete for a spot on a sexy calendar. Maddie begins her training as a 911 dispatcher and a 7.1 magnitude earthquake rocks L.A.
12	2	"7.1"	Bradley Buecker	Zachary Reiter	September 24, 2018	2LAY02	6.60
After a 7.1 magnitude earthquake rocks Los Angeles, the first responders must put their lives on the line and make some of the hardest decisions of their professional careers when they rush to rescue victims from a crumbling high-rise hotel; both under the rubble and high above ground. Meanwhile, Athena must deal with wreckage from a collapsed freeway overpass and Maddie is thrown into the fire as she faces a crisis on her first day as a 911 dispatcher.
13	3	"Help Is Not Coming"	Bradley Buecker	Zachary Reiter & Tim Minear	October 1, 2018	2LAY05	6.09
The first responders continue to deal with the fallout of the earthquake and its deadly aftershocks. Meanwhile, Athena tries to keep the peace and Bobby and his team must help save one of their own while also continuing to rescue victims from the high-rise hotel. Maddie's "baptism by fire" continues as she helps a couple deliver their baby through dispatch.
14	4	"Stuck"	Sarah Boyd	John J. Gray	October 8, 2018	2LAY04	5.92
The first responders deal with a security guard stuck in between two buildings for several hours, a man trapped in a mall escalator, and a drunken girl whose head gets stuck in an oversized tailpipe. Meanwhile, Athena contemplates a lieutenant promotion, Buck begins to get closer to Eddie and learns that he needs help with his son Christopher, who has cerebral palsy, Chimney goes for a check-up following his accident and gets a blast from the past, and Maddie reveals to Buck that she decided to move out.
15	5	"Awful People"	Kevin Hooks	Kristen Reidel	October 15, 2018	2LAY03	5.88
Maddie goes on a ride-along with Athena, but finds her training as a nurse is required when they find a chef who has been the victim of a shooting. He tells them that 9-1-1 hung up on him. She is aided by a seemingly kind and accomplished dispatcher, Gloria. However, Gloria is revealed to be the same dispatcher who hung up on the chef when he was shot; they soon discover Gloria has hung up on hundreds of similar emergency calls, and she is promptly fired and arrested. The 118 are forced to put their disgust aside when a racist protesting a military funeral collapses, but refuses care from Chimney, Hen, and Eddie, while a porch pirate they once dealt with gets a serious dose of karma as she moves up to insurance fraud. Meanwhile, Hen must figure out how to save her family from permanently falling apart after Eva shows up with Denny's biological father. When she finds Eva in a life-or-death situation, Hen chooses to save her.
16	6	"Dosed"	Gwyneth Horder-Payton	Juan Carlos-Coto	October 22, 2018	2LAY06	5.62
When the first responders race to the rescue of a crashed news copter, they unwittingly become the subject of eager reporter Taylor Kelly's first on-air assignment. Whilst being tailed by the camera crew, the team responds to emergencies at an eating contest, a bodybuilding competition, and a toddler pageant, but find some of their members flying high after they ingest LSD-laced fudge. Meanwhile, Bobby tries to deal with his grief/guilt on the anniversary of his daughter's death, Athena prepares for May's homecoming dance, and Maddie struggles to let go of her fear of the past.
17	7	"Haunted"	Loni Peristere	Erica L. Anderson	October 29, 2018	2LAY07	5.63
On Halloween, the first responders race to the rescue at a cemetery, a haunted hayride, and a spooky Hollywood parade. Meanwhile, Hen receives news that her father, who abandoned her at age 9, is dying in hospital and has to make the decision whether or not to pull the plug. Eddie reconnects with his estranged wife Shannon and Buck makes a decision on whether or not to keep waiting for Abby to come back.
18	8	"Buck, Actually"	Varda Bar-Kar	Matthew Hodgson	November 5, 2018	2LAY08	5.59
The first responders deal with emergencies involving a woman who goes to great extremes on top of a freeway overpass to get the attention of her husband, a couple who are involved in a car accident on their wedding day, and a date that involves armed robbery. Meanwhile, Buck jumps back into the dating scene and gets curious as he notices Chimney and Maddie getting closer, and bonds with an elderly man whose husband has been crushed between the gate of their home and their car.
19	9	"Hen Begins"	Jennifer Lynch	Aristotle Kousakis	November 19, 2018	2LAY09	5.15
This episode takes place in 2008, when Hen quits her job as a pharmaceutical rep. While having a conversation with her life coach, the coach has a heart attack and Hen saves her by performing CPR. Realizing being a paramedic might be her calling, she applies to the LAFD. After training she is assigned to Firehouse 118, but immediately belittled by her bigoted captain, Vincent Gerrard. Hen stands up for herself in front of the entire crew and, after she saves the life of a young boy against the wishes of Captain Gerrard, discovers her team has made several complaints about him; Gerrard is subsequently fired. She meets Chimney there, begins a friendship with Athena, and gets a recognition from her teammates Tommy and Sal.
20	10	"Merry Ex-Mas"	Bradley Buecker	Christopher Monfette	November 26, 2018	2LAY10	6.15
It is Christmas time in Los Angeles and the first responders deal with a series of holiday-related emergencies. Meanwhile, Bobby gets cold feet when Athena asks him to move in with her, but then stuns Athena himself when he makes a massive decision about their future. Eddie struggles with whether or not to allow Shannon to reunite with their son and asks Buck for advice. Maddie finds it hard to get into the holiday spirit with the trauma of her past weighing on her. While trying to lift Maddie's spirit of the holidays, Chimney meets a man named Jason Bailey.
21	11	"New Beginnings"	John J. Gray	Tim Minear & Kristen Reidel	March 18, 2019	2LAY11	5.96
The first responders deal with a traffic collision involving a truck returning a tiger shark to the wild and a gas leak at a plastic surgeon's office in the middle of a procedure. Bobby meets Athena's parents and Athena confronts her mom after a cruel comment about Bobby. Athena and Maddie's intuition is praised when claims of a mistaken 911 call uncover a double kidnapping. Maddie attempts to move her relationship with Chimney forward by filing for divorce from her abusive husband Doug only to discover that he has left the city. Jason is revealed to be Doug and viciously stabs Chimney before abducting Maddie.
22	12	"Chimney Begins"	Jennifer Lynch	Erica L. Anderson	March 25, 2019	2LAY12	5.66
Following his stabbing at the hands of Maddie's husband Doug, Chimney's mind is cast back to 2005 when he joined the LAFD. As he wallows in being a failed entrepreneur, a drunken colleague at the bar he's working in starts a fire and Chimney's heroics save everyone. Chimney and his best friend Kevin decide to apply for the LAFD but, while Kevin is full of stories and excited about life with the 133, Chimney is the victim of Captain Gerrard's racial prejudices and becomes a glorified maid for the 118. After weeks of cleaning and biting his tongue, a paramedic called Eli takes pity on him and brings him onboard the ambulance. However, when Gerrard asks him to assist in a 5-alarm fire at an apartment complex, he is reunited with Kevin before the latter sacrifices himself to rescue a pregnant woman from the middle of the burning rooftop. On one of his first calls back on the job after Kevin's death and funeral, Chimney saves the life of fellow firefighter Tommy during a methane leak, earning him the respect of the 118. In the present day, Chimney bleeds out.
23	13	"Fight or Flight"	Millicent Shelton	Kristen Reidel	April 1, 2019	2LAY13	6.16
Buck discovers an unconscious and bleeding Chimney outside Maddie's home. As the medics arrive, Chimney is able to say, "He took her," and Buck realizes that Maddie has been kidnapped by her abusive husband Doug. Buck jeopardizes the case by illegally opening Chimney's phone, but then teams up with an off-duty Athena to track down Maddie. Meanwhile, Maddie does everything in her power to survive her kidnapping. At a rest stop, Maddie attempts to flee, but Doug catches her and kills the storeowner who tries to rescue her. Maddie leaves behind a clue which Athena and Buck find. Maddie manages to convince Doug to drive to a cabin in the woods, where Maddie manages to flee after striking Doug with a poker. Doug gives chase, but Maddie then decides to take a stand and fights Doug; although he stabs her, she gets hold of the knife and fatally stabs him in self-defense. Athena and Buck track Maddie to the cabin and find her. Maddie is overjoyed to hear Chimney is alive and they meet at the hospital, where Maddie kisses him.
24	14	"Broken"	Bradley Buecker	Juan Carlos-Coto	April 15, 2019	2LAY14	5.65
Chaos ensues in Los Angeles when the entire 911 system goes down and everything has to be done manually. The firehouse is put on high alert when so many calls happen at once. Maddie returns to work and arranges a date with Chimney. While he is still unable to be at work, he contacts his old teammate Tommy to assist them when an entire neighborhood blows up during a gas leak and the only hydrant is taken out by a crashing car. The 911 center also assists with a geriatric pregnancy in a building's lobby, but the system outage delays help arriving and puts the mother at risk of dying. Maddie and Terry, the dispatch technician, doubt an FBI team that attends the call center after assuming it was hacked, while Bobby's fire safety talk leads to Harry doing something dangerous and causes tension between Michael and Bobby.
25	15	"Ocean's 9-1-1"	Mary Wigmore	Andrew Meyers	April 22, 2019	2LAY15	5.99
The first responders deal with a suspected nerve agent leak at a local bank and Hen is trapped when she tries to help an unconscious victim inside an automatically locking bank vault. When Hen also passes out, experiencing the same symptoms, Bobby orders the team to break into the vault from the outside. The day takes a dramatic turn when stolen money from the bank is found inside one of the trucks and the entire 118 team is arrested on suspicion of robbing the bank - along with Athena, Maddie, and Michael. Bobby's chief is forced to suspend him due to a discovery made during the robbery investigation.
26	16	"Bobby Begins Again"	Jennifer Lynch	Christopher Monfette	April 29, 2019	2LAY16	5.49
In 2014; while living in Minnesota, Bobby has a fight with his wife about his addiction struggles. While Bobby is out for the night he accidentally starts a fire in his apartment block that kills 148 people, including his wife and two children. Consumed with grief, Bobby is suspended from the fire department after two years of heavy alcoholism and pain killer addiction and forced to enter rehab when his own team has to revive him after attempting suicide. After almost a year in rehab, he decides he wants to go back to work and transfers to Los Angeles to be the new fire Captain at Station 118 where he starts working with Chimney, Hen, Tommy and Sal. He also meets Athena during a call and end ups working with her to solve the case of a restaurant that burnt down. In the present, Bobby is facing dismissal for not disclosing what happened in Minnesota.
27	17	"Careful What You Wish For"	Bradley Buecker	Matthew Hodgson	May 6, 2019	2LAY17	5.81
Chimney is appointed interim captain after Bobby's suspension from the LAFD, but Bobby still remains the "go-to guy" for the 118 members. Things begin to get overwhelming for Chimney during a series of stressful calls, including a lottery winner trying to commit suicide, an explosion at a lawyer's home, and a reformed sugar addict fallen into a vat of molten chocolate. Meanwhile, Eddie's wife Shannon announces that she wants to divorce but, in a tragic turn of events, is killed in a car crash. In the wake of Shannon's death, Bobby and Athena witness a news report about a second bomb attack. Meanwhile, Maddie gets a call from a girl whose brother is contemplating suicide; this leads Maddie to consider quitting as a 9-1-1 Operator, but she is brought into contact with people whose lives she's changed and decides to stay.
28	18	"This Life We Choose"	Bradley Buecker	Tim Minear	May 13, 2019	2LAY18	6.44
Athena and Bobby continue to investigate the serial mail bomber who is terrorizing Los Angeles, with a third incident claiming the life of a judge. Things take a dramatic turn when another package is left on Athena's doorstep, prompting the two to figure out that the bomber's motive is revenge on first responders. Later on, Stationhouse 118 becomes the latest target and the blast leaves many firefighters seriously injured, including Buck who gets pinned under the wreckage after the bomb detonates inside a moving firetruck. The bomber is revealed to be the teenager whose late father torched their family restaurant a few years earlier ("Bobby Begins Again"). Bobby puts himself in harm's way to stop him from carrying out a suicide bombing at the blast site and is hailed a hero before being reinstated as Captain. Buck is told in the aftermath of his ordeal that his leg injury is severe and he may have to consider a different job if he does not fully heal. Following his wife Shannon's death, Eddie's El Paso family tries to pressure him into moving back to Texas. Hen and Karen consider adopting another child. Bobby and Athena get married privately with May and Harry in attendance.

=== Season 3 (2019–20) ===
No. overall	No. in season	Title	Directed by	Written by	Original release date	Prod. code	U.S. viewers (millions)
29	1	"Kids Today"	Jennifer Lynch	Kristen Reidel	September 23, 2019	3LAY01	7.14
This episode is set 5 months after the Season 2 finale. Buck regains his firefighting certification following his accident. The celebration is cut short when Buck throws up blood and it is revealed that he has blood clots from pushing himself to get back to work. Later on, Bobby tells Buck that he is no longer cleared to be back at work and Buck angrily quits the LAFD. Meanwhile, Maddie and the team respond to a pregnant woman being kidnapped and the suspect taking her baby from her womb. The team also responds to an out-of-control teenage driver and an elderly man with a flesh-eating STD. Eddie goes to see Buck to cheer him up and asks him to look after Christopher while he is at work. Buck and Christopher enjoy a day at the Santa Monica Pier. However, Buck and the other piergoers soon realize a tsunami is heading straight for them.
30	2	"Sink or Swim"	Bradley Buecker	Juan Carlos-Coto	September 30, 2019	3LAY02	7.48
Buck and Christopher fight for survival as a catastrophic tsunami hits the Santa Monica Pier. Buck helps Christopher climb on top of the abandoned fire truck belonging to Station 136 and they begin to help survivors escape from the rushing waters. Bobby and the rest of the team also begin to search the water for survivors. Meanwhile, Athena and her daughter May get into a car accident involving many others and are forced to rescue people when the first responders are unavailable. Also, Maddie tries to keep control of the 911 operation center and is left emotional when a caller drowns in his attic. The waves start to recede into the ocean, causing chaos. As Buck tries to help others reach the fire truck, Christopher falls over the side and is lost in the rushing floodwaters, causing a bruised Buck to jump into the water in an attempt to find him.
31	3	"The Searchers"	Chad Lowe	David Fury	October 7, 2019	3LAY03	7.34
Buck continues to search for Christopher. Bobby, Eddie, and Lena of the 136 rescue survivors from a damaged Ferris wheel. Maddie enlists the help of a young girl who is an amateur drone pilot. Also, Athena deals with looters and is forced to amputate a firefighter's arm. Bobby, Chimney, and Hen rescue people from an apartment building, barely escaping before a gas truck explodes. Eddie saves a child and is reunited with Christopher at the triage site as a dehydrated Buck collapses. Eddie reassures Buck that both he and Christopher still trust him because he kept Chris safe.
32	4	"Triggers"	Joaquín Sedillo	David Fury & Christopher Monfette & Tonya Kong	October 14, 2019	3LAY05	6.31
During a fire drill at a high-rise, Buck is on "light duty" as a fire inspector. He is upset to discover Lena has taken his spot at the firehouse. At dinner with Bobby and Athena, Buck storms off after learning that Bobby is responsible for his backbenching. With Athena's encouragement, Hen and Karen decide to expand their family. At dinner with Chimney, Maddie has a flashback about Doug and rushes out in a panic. She secretly seeks out a distressed woman who called 911 only to hang up when her husband hears her. After seeing her arguing with her husband, Maddie almost runs him over with her car, then befriends her by hiring her as a personal trainer. Christopher tells Eddie that the "drowning woman" in his recurring tsunami nightmares is Shannon, his deceased mother. After consulting with a lawyer, Buck decides to sue the city, the department, and Bobby for wrongful termination.
33	5	"Rage"	Jann Turner	Lyndsey Beaulieu	October 21, 2019	3LAY06	6.54
During arbitration proceedings, Buck's lawyer throws the team under the bus. Buck is determined to get his job back and fights with the lawyer when he is informed that monetary reward is the only damage recoverable. Michael, May, and Harry experience a traumatic traffic stop with a patrolling officer and his subordinate, almost leading to Harry getting shot, prompting their family to be outraged at the dangerous racial prejudice of some cops. After reviewing the footage and the officer's rap-sheet of complaints, Athena decides to take matters into her own hands. Lena introduces Eddie to an underground fight ring after his arrest for assault over a parking dispute. He also confronts Buck about the lawsuit and how much that affected him and Christopher. The 118 also deals with young animal rights activists, a woman in a "rage room" with her husband's mistress, and a road rage incident in a parking lot. Bobby reinstates Buck back to the 118 due to the city's desire to settle the lawsuit. Hen and Karen learn that all six of Karen's fertilized eggs have genetic disorders.
34	6	"Monsters"	Tina Mabry	Christopher Monfette	October 28, 2019	3LAY07	6.26
Buck's heavily litigated and liability-waived conditional return to the 118 is dampened by an icy reception, especially from Bobby and a distanced Eddie. Buck and Eddie make amends, and Bobby reinstates Buck as a full member of the team after Buck saves the lives of a man who crashed through the windshield of a woman's car. Athena responds to a house that is filled with malnourished children chained up in the basement after one of them manages to free herself and walk to the neighbors' door. The 118 responds to a call where two young boys are attacked by crows. A crow later follows Chimney around all day to return his lost, forgotten name tag. Maddie continues to befriend the woman with the abusive husband ("Triggers"). The woman eventually finds out that Maddie is stalking her and Maddie's supervisor orders that Maddie undergo a psychological evaluation before returning to work.
35	7	"Athena Begins"	Tasha Smith	Kristen Reidel	November 4, 2019	3LAY04	6.08
Athena receives shocking news that the gun used in her former fiancé Emmett's 28-year old murder cold case was recovered. She then makes it her mission to find the person responsible, much to the dismay of Bobby and her mother, as they think that she's too close to the case. Flashbacks to 1989, reveal when Athena first became a police officer after meeting Emmett at a job fair. Athena finds Emmett's killer Dennis with Maddie's help and, after he confesses his guilt, arrests him, bringing him to the station to be processed. Athena then has an emotional reunion with Emmett's mother, telling her that she has caught her son's killer. Athena then returns to her house and she and Bobby reconcile as she finally breaks down.
36	8	"Malfunction"	Joaquín Sedillo	Tonya Kong	November 11, 2019	3LAY08	6.54
The first responders deal with a series of calls involving a serious accident at an ice skating rink that has severed the fingers of one man and left another man with a skate impaled in his chest, an out of control self-driving car, and a warehouse robot going rogue. Athena is suspended from the LAPD due to her actions from the previous episode. Maddie also remains suspended from the call center and tells Buck and Chimney that she is back in therapy. Meanwhile, Buck worries about Eddie's suspicious attitude. Eddie's fights at the underground ring get out of control when he nearly kills his opponent and he talks to Bobby about his emotions and all that's been going on since Shannon's death. Also, Hen struggles with her relationship with Karen following the loss of the embryos. Hen gets into an ambulance accident with a teenage girl named Evelyn, who dies from her injuries; Hen must face an investigation into the accident conducted by the LAFD and LAPD.
37	9	"Fallout"	Marcus Stokes	Juan Carlos-Coto	November 25, 2019	3LAY09	6.14
Bobby's career and life are put in jeopardy while at a call involving hazardous radioactive waste in the back of a crashed semi truck. Buck feels responsible for Eddie's fighting habits and they have an enlightening conversation while spending time with Christopher. Meanwhile, after being cleared from the fatal car accident, as it was caused by a malfunctioning traffic light, Hen continues to mourn the loss of Evelyn and contemplates not returning to the LAFD. Hen is later reunited with the life coach she saved who inspired her to become a paramedic when she goes to a resort with Karen ("Hen Begins") and she decides to return to work. Also, Maddie receives shocking news from the woman she was attempting to help ("Monsters").
38	10	"Christmas Spirit"	Alonso Alvarez-Barreda	Andrew Meyers	December 2, 2019	3LAY10	6.81
It is Christmas time and the police and first responders deal with calls that involve a runaway airport luggage trolley, a woman whose skin turns blue after self-medicating, and a mall shopper pushed over the edge. A young boy calls 911 after his mom collapses, but fears he may have ended up doing more harm than good while performing the lifesaving procedure urged and directed by Maddie on the phone. Christopher is not happy at learning he will not be spending Christmas with either Eddie or Buck. Meanwhile, after not remembering sleeping in the wrong bed and walking through a glass window, Michael reveals to Bobby that clinical tests determined he has a tumor; Maddie continues with her therapy and relives the day that she killed Doug ("Fight or Flight"); worried about Bobby being exposed to radiation, Buck and Athena secretly put together a Christmas dinner at the station to relieve stress for him.
39	11	"Seize the Day"	Sarah Boyd	Lyndsey Beaulieu	March 16, 2020	3LAY11	6.97
The team responds to a series of calls involving an unconscious skydiving instructor dangling from an airplane, a bank mortgage representative getting run over by a tractor, and a man getting hit across the throat with a pipe. Meanwhile, Chimney receives a surprise visit from his half-brother Albert from Korea whom he has never met; Athena and Michael tell their kids about the progress of Michael's brain cancer battle; Buck gets a clean bill of health from his doctor; Maddie gets to meet Chimney's adoptive parents for the first time.
40	12	"Fools"	David Grossman	Andrew Meyers	March 23, 2020	3LAY12	7.03
Station 118 responds to calls involving a social influencer stunt gone wrong for the second time and a couple on a home date with the woman getting stuck in the bathroom window. Meanwhile, Athena and the LAPD investigate a woman who does not remember being shot in the back of the head. After getting injured while attempting to ride a skateboard at school, Eddie is forced to have a difficult conversation with Christopher as to what his limits are with cerebral palsy, and what he can overcome in ways that are accessible. Josh, one of Maddie's supervisors at the call center, is severely assaulted and mugged while on a first date with a man from a dating app in a cemetery during an outdoor movie screening.
41	13	"Pinned"	John J. Gray	Nadia Abass-Madden & Juan Carlos Coto	March 30, 2020	3LAY13	7.22
The team responds to calls of a woman's arm getting caught in a pin setter at a bowling alley and a man accidentally shooting himself in the chest with a nail gun. Meanwhile, Bobby and Michael take Harry on their annual camping trip, despite May's protests about Michael's health. Athena also talks to Hen about her fears regarding Michael's health. May is accepted into USC for college. Chimney's plans to take Maddie out to a romantic dinner to tell her his true feelings take a dramatic turn when another woman gets pinned in between the wall and a table of the revolving restaurant. Maddie, Josh, and the rest of the 911 call center suddenly are held hostage by fake cops led by the same men that assaulted Josh.
42	14	"The Taking of Dispatch 9-1-1"	Marshall Tyler	Nadia Abass-Madden & Andrew Meyers	April 13, 2020	3LAY15	7.63
One of the criminals dressed as police officers holding Maddie, Josh, and the rest of the staff at the 911 call center prisoner turns out to be Greg, the same man that assaulted Josh. Their plan is to distract the entire police force in order to steal millions of dollars' worth of paintings from a museum. After being tipped off from one of the 911 operators, Athena teams up with Chimney and Buck to help reach a conclusion to the situation. After all the perps have been arrested, it is then revealed that the driver Tiffany was the mastermind behind the heist, having hired Greg and his team in order to put the blame on them for revenge as their former driver, Tiffany's father, had been left behind on their last caper and was killed.
43	15	"Eddie Begins"	Robert M. Williams, Jr.	Teleplay by : Christopher Monfette; Story by : Robert M. Williams, Jr. & Christopher Monfette	April 20, 2020	3LAY14	6.84
Stationhouse 118 responds to a situation involving a child stuck in a sewage pipe. Eddie volunteers to go down and rescue the child, but ends up putting his own life in danger and begins to experience memories from his past. In 2011, Eddie's girlfriend Shannon gives birth to their child Christopher in El Paso, Texas. Later on, their relationship becomes strained after Eddie announces that he plans to reenlist back in the Army. In 2015, Eddie and Shannon discover that Christopher has been diagnosed with cerebral palsy, putting more of a strain on their relationship and leading up to an overwhelmed Shannon leaving to be with her sick mother. In the present, the team tries to rescue him, all of them fearing the worst. Although Eddie nearly dies, the team manages to successfully rescue him.
44	16	"The One That Got Away"	Millicent Shelton	David Fury	April 27, 2020	3LAY16	6.81
After treating a couple trapped in an apartment fire, Hen learns that the husband died from cardiac arrest in the hospital, prompting Hen to question her judgement in the doctors' course of treatment. Later, she saves the life of another man, who accidentally shot himself in the chest with a whipped-cream charger during a TV cooking show, by pinching his aorta in the ambulance. Meanwhile, when every other member of Station 118 has plans after shift, Buck meets a retired firefighter at a bar and decides to help him achieve his goals. Also, while responding to an accident involving a drone, Athena discovers that the drone's owner, who was later released from custody, is actually a serial rapist after footage is found in his garage.
45	17	"Powerless"	Kristen Reidel	Lyndsey Beaulieu & Kristen Reidel	May 4, 2020	3LAY17	6.99
The 118 responds to a call in which a child is trapped in a runaway hot air balloon. Maddie also receives a call from a man trapped inside of a walk-in freezer due to a power outage caused by a woman who stole a tree trimmer truck. Meanwhile, Athena continues her investigation into the serial rapist. She tracks him to a storage facility, where he brutally attacks her as Maddie and the 118 listen to the attack over Athena's radio in horror, although Athena is able to subdue him and stall him long enough for Bobby to arrive. Karen begins to suspect that Hen is cheating on her after finding a suspicious phone number and lying to her about it, while Hen secretly considers going to medical school. Also, Josh asks Maddie for advice when he receives a call about appearing in court to attend Greg's sentencing. A train derailment occurs and former 911 telephone operator Abby Clark calls in the accident.
46	18	"What's Next?"	Jennifer Lynch	Juan Carlos Coto & Kristen Reidel	May 11, 2020	3LAY18	7.29
The 118 rush to save lives in the aftermath of a massive train derailment. Surprisingly, former 911 operator Abby is among those who were on the train and she informs Buck that she has moved on from their relationship and started a new one. The encounter with her leaves Buck in shock and Eddie worried about Buck's ability to work the scene with Abby there. Athena deals with the aftermath of her assault, Maddie reveals some shocking news, Michael gets good news about his health, Buck finally gets closure from Abby regarding their previous relationship, and Hen has a tough choice to make.

=== Season 4 (2021) ===
No. overall	No. in season	Title	Directed by	Written by	Original release date	Prod. code	U.S. viewers (millions)
47	1	"The New Abnormal"	David Grossman	Juan Carlos Coto	January 18, 2021	4LAY01	7.19
The team struggles with their lives during the pandemic, with Athena returning to the LAPD despite Bobby's concerns and May working at the dispatch center under Maddie's supervision. Seismic activity occurring near Hollywood causes the Hollywood Reservoir Dam to break and the team responds to a bus crash and a cyclist trapped inside a sewer after being swallowed by the reservoir flood. The dispatch center senses that a landslide is possible in the Hollywood Hills. Athena is ordered on the field by Captain Maynard, where she responds to an agoraphobic woman named Sylvia who cannot leave her house. After seismic activity is sensed in the hills, Athena tries to get Sylvia to leave with her to safety, but she steps back into the house; Athena follows her while the house, alongside the Hollywood sign, falls.
48	2	"Alone Together"	David Grossman	Lyndsey Beaulieu	January 25, 2021	4LAY02	7.21
A group of hikers witness the Hollywood Sign crashing down, forcing the 118 to go into action while Athena and Sylvia fight for their lives inside her unstable home after a shift in the ground leaves Sylvia pinned. While rescuing a baby from a buried home, Chimney discovers a group of pregnant women being held prisoner inside a buried house, and one of them unexpectedly goes into labor, forcing Chimney to make sure the baby is delivered safely. After being able to reach Athena, May tries to convince her to leave Sylvia behind, but Athena refuses and successfully rescues her, allowing the two to escape. After witnessing Bobby fly by, she alerts him by using her patrol car's emergency flashing lights, giving May a sense of relief. After Athena confronts May about her job, May reveals she took it after witnessing Athena's injuries.
49	3	"Future Tense"	Marita Grabiak	Andrew Meyers	February 1, 2021	4LAY03	6.77
The team at the 118 deals with a series of calls including a man living in a smart home slipping in the shower and hitting his head. Maddie suspects that the 911 caller might be cyberstalking him. Hen's first day in medical school goes badly when one of her fellow students begins to give her a hard time because of her age. After learning that Buck is seeing a therapist, Maddie contemplates telling him a secret from his past. Using a rideshare app, Athena tracks down a bank robber disguised in COVID-19 protocol gear. After the previously-mentioned "smart home" latches onto a remark of Eddie's, Buck and Christopher team up to prank him. Hen, Eddie, and Buck travels to Texas to help fellow firefighters in an out-of-control wildfire.
50	4	"9-1-1, What's Your Grievance?"	Brenna Malloy	Nadia Abass-Madden	February 8, 2021	4LAY04	6.86
During a neighborhood block party, a woman who intimidates the neighborhood calls 9-1-1 to report children with water guns, but unexpectedly is found dead when May overhears a gunshot in the background of the call. Athena is sent to investigate. Maddie and Buck's parents arrive in town to meet Chimney and cause growing tension, and Maddie confiding in Chimney leads to him struggling to keep a secret from Buck. The team is called into action after May oversees a call where a man reports a bomb threat, where Chimney manages to disarm him after talking him down. Maddie reveals the painful family secret: she and Buck had a deceased brother named Daniel.
51	5	"Buck Begins"	Jann Turner	Juan Carlos Coto	February 15, 2021	4LAY05	6.84
In 1996, Maddie teaches Buck how to ride a bike (revealed to have originally belonged to Daniel), but he falls off and is confronted by their parents. In 2004, Maddie reveals that she and her boyfriend are moving to Boston for medical school. In 2012, Buck begins his downward spiral with skipping college and getting into car accidents. After being confronted by his parents, Buck asks Maddie to leave with him, but she cannot because of her controlling husband Doug and gives Buck her car. Between 2012 and 2016, Buck travels around the country, working different jobs and eventually ending up in Los Angeles. He graduates from the fire academy and joins the 118. In the present day, Maddie reveals to Buck that they had a brother that died of leukemia and their parents had Buck as a savior sibling to donate bone marrow, as they and Maddie were not matches. Also, the team responds to a large fire and Buck searches for a victim and rescues him. After a heated confrontation, Buck and Maddie finally reconcile with their parents.
52	6	"Jinx"	Jann Turner	Taylor Wong	February 22, 2021	4LAY06	6.73
The team at the 118 deal with a mountain of bizarre calls after a new recruit, Ravi, "jinxes" the house by using the forbidden word "quiet". A series of calls involve a man duct-taped to a billboard as a publicity stunt, a restaurant manager throwing chairs out of his windows because of a reported gas leak, and a garage on fire with thousands of dollars' worth of fireworks inside. Eddie meets Christopher's former teacher Ana Flores at an accident scene, and goes on a date with her. Athena pursues a man who has stolen the 118 fire engine.
53	7	"There Goes the Neighborhood"	Sharat Raju	Stacey Rose	March 1, 2021	4LAY07	6.40
The team at 118 deal with calls involving a man pinned down by a military truck that fell from a cargo plane and a mysterious gas that made the victims' eyes bleed. Meanwhile, Michael asks for Bobby and Athena's help when he thinks one of his neighbors across the street might be running an illegal surgery ring. Hen is shocked to discover that her mother came to visit unannounced and revealed that she is moving to Los Angeles. Also, Buck learns that a woman that he had a bad date with lives in the same apartment building and does everything in his power to avoid her.
54	8	"Breaking Point"	David Grossman	Bob Goodman	March 8, 2021	4LAY08	6.27
The team responds to a series of calls including a flight attendant jumping out of a parked airplane and a hostage negotiation lasting six hours. Athena deals with a domestic disturbance when a woman tries to kill her husband and hide him in the wall. Meanwhile, Maddie and Chimney discuss having a home birth when COVID-19 protocols get in the way of having a traditional birth. Christopher has a negative reaction upon learning that Eddie is dating and later runs to Buck, who reassures him he will always be there for him. Also, Buck deals with the fallout of his roommate, Albert, going out with his previous date.
55	9	"Blindsided"	Marcus Stokes	Andrew Meyers	April 19, 2021	4LAY09	6.24
The police and first responders are put on full alert after receiving a call of a multi-car pileup. This alcohol-induced accident hits close to home for Bobby, as the cause was a woman drinking and driving the wrong way on the highway as her child in the backseat makes the 911 call. Meanwhile, Maddie goes into labor at the same time Chimney's brother Albert gets caught in a roll-over accident related to the pile-up. Also, Hen and Karen struggle in their own ways with their foster daughter Nia being soon reunited with her mother.
56	10	"Parenthood"	David Grossman	Lyndsey Beaulieu	April 26, 2021	4LAY10	5.96
The team responds to a call at a children's birthday party where a mother is accidentally pinned to a wall by trampoline springs. Meanwhile, Maddie and Chimney adjust to life as new parents while at the same time taking care of Albert following his car accident. Athena and Michael are worried for May when she re-friends the girl whose bullying and humiliation of her drove her to attempt suicide. Bobby and Athena discuss the situation regarding May being at the 911 call center and her previous suicide attempt. Hen and Karen are unsure whether they want to foster again as they miss Nia, but decide to do so. Later on, May listens to the 911 call made by her mother the day she overdosed. May gets emotionally affected and cries when she realizes that her mother thought she was not breathing and was nearly dead.
57	11	"First Responders"	Tasha Smith	Kristen Reidel & Nadia Abass-Madden	May 3, 2021	4LAY11	6.12
911 dispatch supervisor Sue Blevins is the victim of a hit-and-run. Her deputy Josh has trouble keeping the call center in order and reminisces about a fire which Sue helped him escape, when he was freelancing in an office tower back in 2006. When Athena's investigation uncovers that Sue's hit-and-run is related to the kidnapping of 21-year-old Tracie Webber, Athena, the 118, and other officers team up to track down a possible suspect. Josh is able to guide them in a chase through a maze of shipping containers. They successfully arrest the suspect and rescue the kidnapped Tracie. Sue recovers and returns to the 911 call center and cheering everyone up.
58	12	"Treasure Hunt"	David Grossman	Bob Goodman	May 10, 2021	4LAY12	5.83
The city of Los Angeles and the first responders are put into a chaotic situation when a famed author dies and leaves a chest of treasure worth $5 million buried somewhere in Los Angeles, causing the 118 team to break up into various teams to find it. Athena is shocked to discover that the author faked his death to figure out the ending of his latest book, but is even more shocked when the author later turns up actually dead.
59	13	"Suspicion"	Brenna Malloy	Lyndsey Beaulieu & Andrew Meyers	May 17, 2021	4LAY13	5.93
The team responds to a call when a mother has fallen through her apartment balcony. Later on, Eddie suspects that she is deliberately making her child sick for attention and money donated via social media. Meanwhile, Athena and Bobby have marital problems when Bobby keeps a secret from Athena. Maddie experiences post-partum depression following the birth of her child. Hen grows concerned for her mother's health. While on a call, Eddie gets shot in the shoulder by a sniper in front of a shocked Buck, leaving his life hanging in the balance.
60	14	"Survivors"	Robert M. Williams, Jr.	Kristen Reidel	May 24, 2021	4LAY14	6.35
The first responders run for cover after a professional sniper begins targeting firefighters, with Eddie fighting for his life in the hospital. Following the shooting, Buck takes care of Christopher while they struggle with almost losing Eddie. Struggling with PPD, Maddie asks for Chimney's help after she quits her job. Bobby and Athena reconcile following their argument. Hen and Karen meet the mother of their former foster daughter Nia. Eddie confesses to Buck he would be Christopher's legal guardian if anything should happen to him. Buck takes Eddie home to a surprise party. Chimney's half-brother Albert finishes his LAFD training.

=== Season 5 (2021–22) ===
No. overall	No. in season	Title	Directed by	Written by	Original release date	Prod. code	U.S. viewers (millions)
61	1	"Panic"	Bradley Buecker	Tim Minear & Juan Carlos Coto	September 20, 2021	5LAY01	5.08
A group of hackers use ransomware to take over all of L.A.'s technology. The 118 is called when a woman's hacked GPS sends her straight into a river. A scare at an airport control center leads to three operators having heart attacks simultaneously. Athena's suspect Jeffrey Hudson goes on trial, but escapes when the ransomware attack occurs. Eddie experiences a panic attack after a salesman mistakes Ana for Christopher's mom, which worries Buck when he discovers it. Maddie's post-partum depression worsens. The attack causes a citywide blackout, leading to the 118 helping out at a short-staffed hospital. Jeffrey's attorney is revealed to be in love with him and helping his escape when she slits Detective Lou Ransone's throat.
62	2	"Desperate Times"	Bradley Buecker	Lyndsey Beaulieu & Andrew Meyers	September 27, 2021	5LAY02	5.45
The 118 springs into action when a hospital helicopter crashes due to the blackout and animals from the L.A. Zoo escape. The blackout coincides with a major heatwave, and Michael and Harry open up Athena and Bobby's house to hot and thirsty neighbors. Chimney confides in Hen about Maddie's condition. A 12-year-old boy's ventilator runs out of battery and his neighbors, with May's help, band together to recharge and restart it. Eddie starts realizing his panic attacks might be related to his relationship with Christopher's former teacher and opens up to Buck about it, who encourages Eddie to follow his heart and break up with her. Jeffrey Hudson escapes again after killing his attorney and kidnaps Harry (Marcanthonee Jon Reis) as vengeance against Athena.
63	3	"Desperate Measures"	Ben Hernandez Bray	Kristen Reidel	October 4, 2021	5LAY04	5.25
Athena and Michael frantically search for Harry as the blackout continues. The 118 is called to an accidental shooting in an enclave formed of people who hate any kind of official personnel. Jeffrey Hudson is also hiding there. Athena goes undercover to look for him with the 118's help, during which she kills Jeffrey and saves Harry. The blackout ends with the hackers going offline before their identity can be determined. Eddie breaks up with Ana after admitting he was trying to make the relationship work for Christopher, even though his heart was not in it. Maddie leaves baby Jee-Yun at the firehouse, along with a video message to Chimney that she is sorry and fears that the baby is not safe with her.
64	4	"Home and Away"	Brenna Malloy	Bob Goodman	October 11, 2021	5LAY03	5.25
The 118 jumps in when a truck crashes into a high school homecoming parade. Eddie and Hen misidentify two cheerleader victims, one of whom was killed and the other injured. Athena and Michael try to help Harry in the aftermath of his kidnapping, but end up struggling emotionally as well. May is intimidated by returning call center legend Claudette Collins, who denigrates her due to her lack of experience. Chimney obsesses over trying to figure out what led Maddie to leave and finds out Buck knew more than he'd revealed. Buck tells Chimney not to worry, but Chimney angrily punches Buck, emotionally saying he is not okay. Buck opens up to Eddie about wanting to do what's best for his sister and Eddie helps him understand both Maddie's and Chimney's points of view. Chimney decides to go find Maddie and is seen off by Hen.
65	5	"Peer Pressure"	Joaquín Sedillo	Nadia Abass-Madden	October 18, 2021	5LAY05	5.28
The 118 is called in when a man overdoes exercising and a groundskeeper is injured by his own chainsaw. May talks to Athena about Claudette, but refuses any help from her. Bobby is called when Harry gets suspended from school for fighting and exhibiting a bad attitude, a result of misinterpreting advice May gave him. Bobby demands Harry open up to his parents about his problems, but Harry runs away to May's apartment instead. When Athena and Michael track him down, Harry angrily blames them for the kidnapping, causing Athena to slap him, much to everyone's disapproval. A meth lab in a retirement home explodes due to a faulty chandelier. May receives brief praise from Claudette due to saving a suicidal teenager, but the putdowns continue. Michael upsets Athena when he refers her to a therapist without consulting her, remembering their mutual promise to never hit their kids. Buck's stress over not hearing from Chimney or Maddie mounts and he takes out his anger by bossing around probational firefighter Ravi. Buck finally gets a call from Maddie, which inadvertently gives him a clue as to her whereabouts.
66	6	"Brawl in Cell Block 9-1-1"	Paula Hunziker	Andrew Meyers	November 1, 2021	5LAY07	5.20
The 118 is on their guard when they respond to a fire started by a prison riot. Two inmates escape and take Buck, Eddie, and an injured guard hostage in the 118's ambulance while the rest of the team are trapped in the prison infirmary with the prison doctor and another injured guard. Athena discovers the motive for the escape was so one of the hostage-takers could see his son, who is dying from heart disease. The prisoner wants to be killed so that his heart can be used. Athena manages to save Buck and capture the other escapee. Eddie manages to talk the desperate father into turning himself in, promising to find his son another donor so both can live, but the convict commits suicide after releasing Eddie. Even though it is against protocol, Athena manages to arrange for the convict's heart to be used for the transplant by advocating for a commutation of his sentence to life imprisonment, saving his son's life. Meanwhile, Hen decides to go into general surgery after successfully saving the injured guard's life with an emergency operation.
67	7	"Ghost Stories"	Kristen Windell	Stacey R. Rose	November 8, 2021	5LAY06	5.01
May gets a call from a man who claims he was carjacked, shot, and buried alive. The 118 rescues him, but are puzzled by his ordeal. Lou Ransone returns to duty and investigates the suspicious burial. Meanwhile, Chimney continues his search for Maddie, during which he arrives in Boston and saves a baby boy who goes into cardiac arrest in a parking garage. Eva pays Hen an unexpected visit and tells her she is leaving California and moving to Oregon to make a fresh start. Harry struggles with his trauma, which eventually leads him to visit the place where Jeffrey took him. While there, he falls through the floor and calls Athena for help. After talking with Ransone, Harry decides to return home.
68	8	"Defend In Place"	James Wong	Taylor Wong	November 15, 2021	5LAY09	5.11
After witnessing the aftermath of the storm in Haiti, David decides to go use his medical skills to help the people in need. Michael, who cannot think of life without David even for a while, decides to propose, but his plans are interrupted when an explosion occurs at the hospital where David is doing surgery. Claudette takes the call of a young boy trapped during the explosion. However, she is devastated when the call fails and Buck confirms the room was lost to the fire; however, it is revealed the boy misread the room number and he is still alive. Despite a successful rescue, Claudette feels overwhelmed by the call. David is reunited with Michael and he accepts the proposal. After the fire, Michael reveals he will be going with David to Haiti.
69	9	"Past Is Prologue"	Marcus Stokes	Ian Sobel	November 29, 2021	5LAY08	5.37
The 118 puts their skills to the test when a student driver's car gets stuck in a sinkhole caused by an exploding oil well and the instructor is stabbed in the chest by her own pen. A man shocks himself while jumpstarting his car and, when the 118 responds, it is revealed that he knew Hen's mother in 1974. Taylor goes to Oklahoma to see her father, who was jailed for murdering her mother and now eligible for parole. She tells Buck she does not want him to come, but he surprises her there. Athena investigates when a Santa Claus volunteer tries to cash in a donated casino chip for the charity he's helping at, which turns out to have been part of the loot in a robbery from that same casino in 1987. Hen gives Toni the courage she needs to reconnect with her former flame.
70	10	"Wrapped in Red"	Brenna Malloy	Lyndsey Beaulieu & Nadia Abass-Madden	December 6, 2021	5LAY10	5.39
In a Christmas village attraction, a woman learns that her husband is also married to another woman. The man tries to run away, but is hit by a trolley, needing the 118 crew to step in. A woman gains the courage to ask her co-worker out on a date; however, when he reacts unexpectedly, she backs away and into an open elevator shaft. Eddie notices Christopher stressing out over the need to make Christmas perfect. Part of a housing complex collapses on a car, trapping the man inside. Due to instability, his family and all the other residents are left without their homes for Christmas. Bobby and Athena set up a Christmas celebration on the lawn outside the motel for all the families. After a talk with Bobby, Eddie tells Buck and Hen that he is leaving the 118 due to Christopher's fear that he could lose his dad.
71	11	"Outside Looking In"	Shauna Duggins	Bob Goodman	March 21, 2022	5LAY11	5.37
With their new temporary paramedic Jonah Greenway, the 118 jumps in when a quinceañera stunt leads to the discovery of a paraglider who crashed into a garage roof. Eddie starts working at the 911 dispatch center, but struggles to settle in. In a parody of the movie Speed, a family's truck is rigged with a bomb that will explode if the car slows below 55 mph. Eddie overhears the 911 call and takes over to warn Bobby of a likely secondary sensor on the bomb. After, Josh congratulates Eddie for his quick thinking, but tells him to never again hijack calls. Eddie goes to meet the 118, who are celebrating in a bar, but sees how happy everyone looks without him and quickly leaves. Buck strikes up a conversation with Lucy Donato, a firefighter who assisted in the bomb rescue; they end up kissing. However, Buck cannot bring himself to tell Taylor and instead asks her to move in. Christopher tells his father he never wanted him to quit. Eddie asks to return to the 118, but Bobby does not feel Eddie is ready to return, angering him. Athena is called to a dispute where a man's habit of collecting junk results in him constantly fighting with his neighbors. Upon learning that the pickup truck family from earlier lives across the street, Athena realizes that the man is the bomber and apprehends him. Both Jonah and Lucy end up joining the 118, to Hen's chagrin and Buck's horror, respectively.
72	12	"Boston"	Dwight Little	Lyndsey Beaulieu	March 28, 2022	5LAY15	4.97
Maddie returns to the series, first shown attempting to drown herself after dropping Jee-Yun at the 118 firehouse, but reconsidering after thinking about Chimney and their daughter. Maddie receives therapy and treatment in Boston and begins making progress with her PPD, then starts helping a fellow patient who is a recovering alcoholic. Chimney manages to track Maddie to Boston but cannot locate her, so begins working as a volunteer paramedic. His first day happens to be St. Patrick's Day and he responds to a bagpipe player who collapses during a bar brawl. Chimney and Maddie reunite when the woman Maddie is trying to help relapses with alcohol poisoning and they save her life together. Maddie visits Jee-Yun at Chimney's temporary apartment and later decides she is ready to come home.
73	13	"Fear-o-Phobia"	Marcus Stokes	Andrew Meyers & Juan Carlos Coto	April 11, 2022	5LAY12	5.06
Chimney and Maddie return to Los Angeles and reveal they have broken up. The 118 responds to a novice diver who resurfaces too quickly after panicking in a shark cage and a man entangled in a web spun by the tarantulas he was pet-sitting. Eddie has a therapy session, but does not manage to open up. Maddie and Buck talk about Buck's fear of being left behind and he recognizes he might be settling for Taylor. Buck confesses to Taylor about kissing Lucy, and Taylor realizes that's why he asked her to move in with him. Because of a medical condition, a woman loses her ability to feel fear, causing her to douse a man with gasoline after he attempts to rob her and almost jump off a recycling plant tower. Taylor and Buck make up, promising not to keep any more secrets. Eddie has a breakdown after trying to reach out to an old army friend, scaring Christopher, who calls Buck for help. Buck rushes to the house and calms Eddie down, and Eddie reveals he has just learned all of the soldiers he saved have since died.
74	14	"Dumb Luck"	John J. Gray	Taylor Wong	April 18, 2022	5LAY13	5.04
Shortly after Chimney rejoins the team, the 118 has a wild day when they respond to a woman who fell off a penthouse balcony and a man stuck in a clothing donation box. Maddie considers returning to the call center. Athena pursues a pair of pranksters stealing road signs after one of their signs flies out of their truck and impales a cyclist, then ends up coming to the rescue when one of them is hit by a car. Buck takes care of Chris and Eddie while the latter continues his therapy. He finds the boy Eddie saved from his abusive mother right before being shot ("Suspicion") and shows Eddie how much the boy's life has improved because of him.
75	15	"FOMO"	Marita Grabiak	Nicole Barraza Keim	April 25, 2022	5LAY14	5.08
The 118 has a hectic day when a college student living a double life as a media influencer cannot be located after falling in a sauna, and a reality TV wedding turns chaotic after the groom collapses. May's USC deferral is about to end; she must either start college or lose her spot. Karen starts feeling her age when she compares herself to her much younger colleagues and responds by taking Hen to unique places and exhibits until her purse is stolen. The 118 responds to a woman who fell into an old underground military fortress while hiking with her daughters. The woman refuses to be transported until she speaks to her kids one last time, as she is already dying from her wounds; she succumbs to her injuries after doing so. Maddie struggles with feeling like a bad mother after missing so many milestones in Jee-Yun's life while in Boston. Hen and Karen track down the purse thief at a nightclub after Hen's credit card (which was in Karen's purse) is used, giving Karen the excitement she was after. Chimney and Maddie happily witness Jee-Yun feeding herself for the first time.
76	16	"May Day"	Juan Carlos Coto	Juan Carlos Coto	May 2, 2022	5LAY16	5.12
May yells at Claudette in front of the other dispatchers, leading Sue to put them both in the "quiet room" to work things out. Albert tells Chimney he no longer wants to be a firefighter. The dispatch call center is set on fire and May and Claudette are left behind in the evacuation panic. When Bobby learns May is still inside, he rushes in to save her. Claudette mysteriously starts losing hope, and it is revealed she is afraid of fire after May finds burn scars on her shoulder. Buck and Eddie manage to save an electrician while Bobby finds May and Claudette just in time. Just after Claudette is brought of the building, Albert, who is on the roof with Chimney, falls through, causing the ceiling to collapse on May and Bobby. Both survive and, after they are taken outside, Claudette finally accepts May as a teammate. Eddie realizes being a firefighter is his calling. Chimney accepts Albert's decision to quit. Claudette suddenly dies upon arriving at the hospital, causing Hen to become suspicious of Jonah, who was administering first aid in the ambulance.
77	17	"Hero Complex"	Marita Grabiak	Stacey R. Rose & Kristen Reidel	May 9, 2022	5LAY17	5.30
At 13, Jonah was celebrated as a hero for saving a school bus driver who had a heart attack. In the present, Hen grows suspicious of Jonah after Claudette's death and recalls another patient who coded while Jonah was present. She and Chimney investigate his past, discovering a pattern of mysterious deaths linked to him. Hen suspects Jonah is "playing God" to relive the fame of his childhood heroics. Bobby reports her concerns, prompting an investigation, but Jonah discovers this and kidnaps Hen and Chimney. Hen confronts him, and Jonah admits he wants recognition as more than a one-time hero. Chimney escapes, subdues Jonah, and he is arrested. Bobby punches Jonah for betraying the team. Taylor breaks Buck’s trust by running a story on Jonah despite promising not to. Meanwhile, Eddie visits his estranged father in Texas for his retirement party, leading to a heartfelt reconciliation after learning his father hid health issues out of pride.
78	18	"Starting Over"	Kristen Reidel	Kristen Reidel	May 16, 2022	5LAY18	5.55
The 118 rescues a wellness guru stuck on a cliff after his followers turn on him for drugging their drinks. Chimney and Maddie share lunch, where he mistakenly thinks she wants to date others, but she clarifies she's considering returning to work as a dispatcher. The team also helps a hairdresser who passes out while working on a client’s hair implants, discovering maggots caused by using hair from deceased donors. Clive and Toni announce their engagement and plan to wed in Hen and Karen’s backyard, upsetting Karen, who recalls Toni skipping their wedding. After talking, Karen agrees to host the ceremony, only for Toni to surprise them with a vow renewal for Hen and Karen. Buck breaks up with Taylor after realizing he is unhappy. Eddie reassures Bobby during a difficult moment, prompting Bobby to discard hidden alcohol. At the vow renewal, Bobby gifts Athena cruise tickets for a belated honeymoon. Eddie returns to the 118, reuniting the team.

=== Season 6 (2022–23) ===
No. overall	No. in season	Title	Directed by	Written by	Original release date	Prod. code	U.S. viewers (millions)
79	1	"Let the Games Begin"	Jann Turner	Andrew Meyers	September 19, 2022	6LAY01	4.82
The 118 rushes to the rescue when a blimp crashes into a crowded football stadium; during the panic, Athena saves a girl with an artificial heart. Maddie temporarily moves in with Chimney and their residual feelings come to a head. Bobby tries to decide who will be interim captain while he is on his honeymoon, prompting Buck to wonder why he was not asked. Hen, dealing with the stress of medical school, adds a new responsibility to her plate. Athena and Bobby are preparing to leave for their honeymoon when a family emergency arises.
80	2	"Crash & Learn"	Juan Carlos Coto	Juan Carlos Coto	September 26, 2022	6LAY02	4.56
Athena and Bobby must travel to Florida when Samuel suffers a stroke. With Hen as the interim captain, the 118 responds to a man who used explosives to kill a supposed gopher tunneling under his garden, but the revealed truth is stranger. Hen exhausts herself juggling work and med school. Beatrice is in denial over Samuel's condition, causing tension with Bobby and Athena, meanwhile an old friend, Junior, helps repair the damage from Samuel's accident. A building collapse at a happiness convention traps attendees and staff, the team struggles to save everyone. Police swarm Athena's childhood home after Bobby discovers the body of Tanya Kingston, whose disappearance 45 years ago first inspired Athena to become a cop ("Haunted").
81	3	"The Devil You Know"	Steven Tsuchida	Lyndsey Beaulieu	October 3, 2022	6LAY04	5.00
In a flashback to 1977, a 9-year-old Athena wakes up to the alert that Tanya Kingston has gone missing. In the present, Samuel is being considered a suspect in Tanya’s death and Athena is reluctant to defend her father despite believing in his innocence. Athena and Bobby visit Tanya’s old home and are confronted by her older sister Joanne, who believes Samuel killed Tanya but soon admits she blames herself for what happened. Athena then learns that Junior was with Tanya the night she went missing. Bobby discovers that Junior has taken Joanne hostage and rescues her with Athena’s help while Junior is arrested. It is revealed that Junior killed Tanya after attempting to molest her, had killed five other girls for the same reason, and that his father Reggie was covering for him. Athena then receives the news that her father is awake and will recover.
82	4	"Animal Instincts"	Michael Medico	Stacey R. Rose	October 10, 2022	6LAY03	4.90
The 118 save a man trapped under tree roots and, later, a dog who consumed drugs. Bobby comforts Hen over her struggles as captain. Buck agrees to be a sperm donor for his friend Connor. Eddie learns to give Christopher more independence. Chimney treats a drunk driver who drives off with him, with Buck giving chase. Hen gets a second chance at med school. Maddie gets help with a call from a girl in danger from her abusive father. Athena returns home after finding a caregiver for her father.
83	5	"Home Invasion"	Marita Grabiak	Nadia Abass-Madden	October 17, 2022	6LAY05	4.97
Athena investigates a suspicious string of robberies after two home invasion incidents occur at the same house within 24 hours, while the 118 responds to a DIY project gone wrong. Hen completes her medical practical and passes to now officially become a doctor after she spends one last moment with her colleagues at the 118. Bobby must find a new home for less-than-well-behaved rescue dog Hoover, who ends up temporarily fostered by every member of the 118; after dozens of failed placements, Bobby gives the dog to a woman whose husband was injured during one of the home invasions. It's revealed that 911 dispatcher Noah was an accomplice in the home invasions, having learned Maddie's password, using it to access information about unattended houses and attempting to frame her for causing them.
84	6	"Tomorrow"	Joaquín Sedillo	Nicole Barraza Keim	October 24, 2022	6LAY06	5.15
Karen brings a curious Denny to the lab she works for, telling him about her dreams when she was his age. While Denny is on the phone with Hen, one of Karen's coworkers accidentally triggers a malfunction, causing an explosion. The 118 is called to help, while Hen is forced to watch from the sidelines. In flashbacks, Hen and Karen have their first date, unknowingly set up by a familiar face. Hen and Karen's relationship is shown throughout the years, including when Denny came into their lives, and a rough patch they almost didn't make it through. Karen nearly dies from injuries she sustained during the explosion, with Hen being the one to save her life. Hen ends up making a final decision about her career.
85	7	"Cursed"	James Wong	Taylor Wong	November 7, 2022	6LAY07	5.09
Felisa, a former B-grade film actress and current livestreamer, is crushed by a chandelier upon opening and putting on an antique bracelet. The 118 begin to believe that the bracelet carries a curse, as numerous incidents with Felisa occur while she is wearing it. Eventually, Athena catches the suspect, a counterfeiter trying to steal back the bracelet. After numerous delays, Buck is able to successfully complete his sperm donation.
86	8	"What's Your Fantasy?"	Marita Grabiak	Andrew Meyers	November 14, 2022	6LAY08	4.94
The 118 investigates a series of calls that have to do with fantasies, including a teenager at a Renaissance-themed festival who gets several bees stuck in her knight suit, a man who fears he may have accidentally killed his boss after fantasizing about it, and a couple attempting to have sex on top of the 118's fire truck while it is en route. May meets an old friend, Darius, and inadvertently learns that one of his roommates, Erik, may be planning a mass shooting. Erik threatens Darius' life but, with Athena's help, May is able to defuse the situation and Erik is arrested. Eddie wonders if Christopher has a crush following a conversation about a school party. Chimney and Maddie try to find a new house for them and a very active Jee-Yun, but are unsuccessful.
87	9	"Red Flag"	Brenna Malloy	Nicole Barraza Keim	November 28, 2022	6LAY09	4.96
As the Santa Ana winds hit L.A., the 118 is thrust into a series of unexpected calls. A dog returns to its owner's house holding a severed hand, which is quickly revealed to be the result of several teens playing with fireworks. A reputed haunted house repeatedly calls Josh, forcing the police to investigate and Chimney to shut down the malfunctioning phone line. A woman, while sleepwalking, hotwires a car and drives into the fire station. Bobby is devastated to find that his friend and sponsor Wendall was killed in a fire near a rehab center and suspects that the founders of the rehab center had something to do with it. Chimney and Maddie ultimately decide to buy the "haunted" house due to its cheap price from the false rumors. Buck receives word that Connor and his wife are expecting a child. Denny asks Hen about Eva and is later shown knocking on a man's door, saying he believes him to be his father.
88	10	"In a Flash"	Bradley Buecker	Juan Carlos Coto	March 6, 2023	6LAY10	4.95
A dry thunderstorm rolls over L.A., bringing in a series of lightning strike emergencies for the 118, including one where a man's kids prank him by burying him in sand, but the lightning strike causes the sand to turn into glass. Athena and May go undercover at the rehab facility to help Bobby with his investigation into Wendall's mysterious death. Maddie dreads her parents' visit to her and Chimney's new yet unfinished house, while Chimney gets visited by Albert, their father, and his wife. Meanwhile, Denny is secretly talking to his biological father and taking baseball lessons from him. Buck suddenly gets struck by lightning while on a call, with the team scrambling to pull him to safety.
89	11	"In Another Life"	Joaquín Sedillo & Jann Turner	Lyndsey Beaulieu	March 13, 2023	6LAY11	4.38
As Buck's life hangs in the balance, he dreams of a world where his older brother Daniel never died. Though perfect at first, he finds that it means that Maddie never met Chimney and is still married to Doug, Eddie lost custody of Christopher, and Bobby died from alcohol poisoning. Buck thinks that, if he fixes things, he can come back to the real world. In the end, he finds that what he needed to do was fight, and find his way back to his family.
90	12	"Recovery"	John J. Gray	Andrew Meyers	March 20, 2023	6LAY12	4.41
Bobby continues investigating the rehab center and learns from Tamara, a former patient, that Wendall was there trying to expose the criminal activities of the center's owners, the Walshes. The Walshes kidnap Tamara and force her to call Bobby; when he arrives, they burn down the center in an attempt to frame him. Luckily, Athena and Tamara provide evidence and the Walshes are arrested. Meanwhile, Buck feels overwhelmed by his family and friends' attempts to take care of him as he recovers from his near-death experience, so he goes to see Eddie and ends up falling asleep on his couch. Afterwards, the two open up about their respective traumas.
91	13	"Mixed Feelings"	Jihane Mrad Balaa	Stacey R. Rose	April 10, 2023	6LAY13	4.48
Maddie is visited by her overly friendly neighbor Carol; however, when Maddie visits the house Carol told her she was from, she is greeted by a person who tells her that "Carol" is an imposter. Maddie teams up with Bobby and Athena in order to solve the case and it is revealed that "Carol" is a coupon forger using Maddie and Chimney’s address to receive payments for her bogus coupons because she thinks the house is still abandoned. In addition, Hen discovers that Denny has been seeing his father Nathaniel after the latter two get into a car crash. Hen's mother Toni helps calm matters between Hen, Karen, and Nathaniel and they are able to work out a plan for Denny to bond with Nathaniel. Meanwhile, Buck temporarily gets enhanced math skills from being struck by lightning and Eddie takes him to a fire personnel poker game where he wins several matches. Emergencies featured include an instructor collapsing at a gym and a teenager allergic to water.
92	14	"Performance Anxiety"	Shauna Duggins	Nadia Abass-Madden	April 17, 2023	6LAY14	4.46
On the day of performance evaluations, Bobby sends Chimney to the academy as an instructor, ostensibly to work on the latter's leadership skills but, in reality, to convince Ravi to return to the 118 after an off duty trauma. Meanwhile, Eddie's aunt pressures him to go on a date with a friend's niece, which goes poorly but ends amicably. Emergencies include a former bodybuilding champion popping a muscle implant at a bodybuilder competition, a woman getting her arm trapped in a mixing machine, and a teenager having a panic attack before his big audition.
93	15	"Death and Taxes"	Greg Sirota	Taylor Wong	April 24, 2023	6LAY15	4.53
Maddie and Chimney get audited by the IRS and learn they could save money on their taxes if they were married, causing Chimney to secretly begin looking for a ring to give her. A man Athena apprehended suffers a heart attack and seemingly dies in the hospital, but actually swaps himself with a dead patient; after Athena apprehends him again, he suffers an actual fatal heart attack. Emergencies in this episode include a man accidentally lighting himself on fire in an office building while trying to destroy tax records and a car crashing into the living funeral of a woman who has bone cancer. Eddie takes Christopher to visit Shannon's grave. A death doula they met on a call shows interest in Buck. Eddie warns him about dating someone they saved and Buck opens up to him about how the lightning strike has made him question his own mortality.
94	16	"Lost & Found"	Brenna Malloy	Lyndsey Beaulieu	May 1, 2023	6LAY16	4.17
Chimney struggles with his decision to propose to Maddie after buying a ring. He ends up misplacing the ring some time during his work day, and tension rises among the team when Chimney starts pointing fingers. Hen and Chimney go on a wild goose chase for the ring and Athena pulls them out of a sticky situation. Emergencies include two teens buried in trash while looking for a hard drive, a woman's son going missing, and a woman spitting out tonsil stones, mistaking them for teeth.
95	17	"Love Is in the Air"	Juan Carlos Coto	Juan Carlos Coto	May 8, 2023	6LAY17	4.48
Maddie finds Chimney's missing ring hidden in Jee-Yun's dollhouse and accidentally gets it stuck on her finger. After talking with Buck and Hen, who expresses her concerns about Chimney with his and Maddie's complicated past, Maddie decides to propose to Chimney. Meanwhile, Eddie is not having good luck in love, but runs into Marisol, whom he met in a previous emergency ("Home Invasion"). Buck starts dating Natalia, the death doula. Emergencies include a man's skydiving parachute getting caught and dragged by a robber's truck just as he's about to propose to his girlfriend, a woman's husband peacefully dying of cancer despite appearances, and an elderly bride accidentally falling through the rotted floor of her wedding carriage.
96	18	"Pay It Forward"	Bradley Buecker	Nicole Barraza Keim & Andrew Meyers	May 15, 2023	6LAY18	4.32
When a bridge collapses in the middle of an emergency, most of the 118 are incapacitated and it's up to Buck, Ravi, and Athena to save everyone. Buck and Ravi save Hen, Chimney, and Eddie while Athena, with the help of a man Bobby saved back in Season 2 ("7.1."), saves Bobby. In the aftermath, Buck helps Connor's wife give birth, helping the couple to reconcile, and Natalia arrives to apologize to Buck. Eddie calls Marisol for a date. Maddie and Chimney discuss plans to get married, Hen and Karen decide to adopt another baby from an elderly grandma, and Bobby and Athena finally go on their honeymoon cruise.

=== Season 7 (2024) ===
No. overall	No. in season	Title	Directed by	Written by	Original release date	Prod. code	U.S. viewers (millions)
97	1	"Abandon Ships"	John J. Gray	Tim Minear	March 14, 2024	7LAY01	4.93
After a fighter jet crashes into the home of a bickering couple, Chimney worries that his relationship with Maddie is "calcifying" and attempts to fix it; but another emergency helps him realizes the importance of staying relaxed in the relationship. Eddie asks Buck for help with Christopher. Bobby and Athena finally go on their honeymoon cruise and encounter Norman and Lola Peterson, a couple whose marriage they helped mend in Season 2 ("Buck, Actually"). When Lola goes missing, Athena suspects Norman of murdering her, but later learns that she was taken by a gang of pirates who believe Norman possesses a dongle containing a fortune in Bitcoin on it. The pirates board the cruise ship and take everyone hostage.
98	2	"Rock the Boat"	Bradley Buecker	Lyndsey Beaulieu & Juan Carlos Coto	March 21, 2024	7LAY02	5.42
Believing that he has the dongle, the pirates injure Norman. Its true owner, Julian, the ship’s activities director who has been having an affair with Lola, surrenders the dongle to the pirates. The pirates leave, but not before detonating a bomb that destroys communications and damages the ship. Athena apprehends Julian before she and Bobby go to the bilge room to try and keep the ship afloat. They become trapped and nearly drown before Julian saves them. An approaching hurricane capsizes the ship. Meanwhile, Hen has been serving as interim captain of the 118 and worries she may lose her job following an emergency when a driver who refused medical attention and was seemingly unscathed dies unexpectedly. The driver turns out to be the son of city Councilwoman Olivia Ortiz who wants Hen investigated, but she is eventually exonerated. Later, Hen notices that Bobby and Athena’s ship has vanished from radar and recruits the aid of Maddie to locate it.
99	3	"Capsized"	Bradley Buecker	Juan Carlos Coto & Lyndsey Beaulieu	March 28, 2024	7LAY03	5.53
Most cruise ship passengers have evacuated aside from Bobby and Athena’s group, who encounter a woman whose young son, Cory, was accidentally left behind. Bobby goes to find Cory while Athena and the rest of the group proceed to the hole in the hull. It is too high to escape through the hole but fire flares through it, with Julian falling and dying attempting to help. Athena manages to fire the flare successfully, alerting the 118, who have located the ship’s whereabouts and travelled there in an LAFD helicopter piloted by former 118 member Tommy. They rescue Athena’s group, along with Bobby and Cory, allowing them to reunite with their families.
100	4	"Buck, Bothered and Bewildered"	Chad Lowe	Andrew Meyers & Bradley Michael Marques	April 4, 2024	7LAY04	4.76
Eddie and Tommy become good friends, prompting jealousy from Buck. Buck confesses wanting Tommy's attention, Tommy kisses Buck and the two agree to go on a date. Athena's joy at Harry returning to Los Angeles is short-lived when learning he is in trouble after a run-in with a discriminatory bodega owner. Emergencies include the season premiere of The Bachelor being interrupted by a wannabe candidate supergluing herself to the driveway, a talking restaurant sink caused by a man trapped in the sewers below, and an elderly woman calling 911 after shooting an intruder who turns out to be her own son.
101	5	"You Don't Know Me"	Brenna Malloy	Lyndsey Beaulieu & Taylor Wong	April 11, 2024	7LAY05	4.61
A motivational speaker develops alien hand syndrome and comically attacks the 118 when they arrive to help. Later, after Eddie shows up at the same restaurant as Buck and Tommy, where a nervous Buck misrepresents true nature of his date with Tommy, prompting Tommy to end the night early. Buck comes out to Maddie and Eddie, helping him understand his sexuality. Over coffee, Buck reaffirms his feelings for Tommy and asks him to be his date to Maddie and Chimney’s wedding. Meanwhile, Eddie seeks out advice from Bobby on his relationship with Marasol. Hen and Karen's new foster daughter Mara exhibits volatile behavior. Hen struggles with this but realizes that Mara’s behavior stems from trauma concerning her parents' fatal overdoses. Mara eventually finds comfort with the Wilsons. As the episode concludes we see Buck and Eddie arrive to Maddie's wedding disheveled, with Chimney nowhere to be found.
102	6	"There Goes the Groom"	John J. Gray	Tim Minear & Nicole Barraza Keim	May 2, 2024	7LAY06	4.28
When Chimney fails to show up to his wedding, the 118 set out to locate him. They discover he is suffering from viral encephalitis, contracted weeks prior from a man he helped extricate from a heating duct, and later respond to a roadway excursion where even suffering from amnesia, Chimney had been there helping casualties. Chimney has been wandering the city in a disoriented state and re-visiting locations from his past. He is haunted by apparitions of Doug Kendall, who taunts him to the point of near-death before he is saved by the image of his late foster brother Kevin Lee and eventually found by Kevin’s parents, who take him to the hospital for treatment. With Chimney’s memory returning, he and Maddie decide to hold their wedding in his hospital room. Soon after, Buck comes out to the rest of the 118 after he shows up with his face dirtied from kissing a soot-covered Tommy.
103	7	"Ghost of a Second Chance"	James Wong	Taylor Wong & James Wong	May 9, 2024	7LAY07	4.39
Maddie receives a 9-1-1 call from a woman who has been abducted along with her baby. The car eventually crashes, but only the woman is found when responders arrive. Sympathizing with the woman, Maddie visits her at the hospital and meets a nurse named Amir. The kidnapper crashes into a police car while fleeing with another newly-kidnapped mother and is promptly apprehended by Athena and the 118. When Bobby returns the baby to her mother at the hospital, Amir recognizes him. Hen and Karen reunite Mara with her younger half-brother who was adopted by another family. Eddie encounters a woman, Kim, who is the spitting image of his late wife Shannon and he begins an emotional affair with her.
104	8	"Step Nine"	John J. Gray	Tim Minear & Kristen Reidel	May 16, 2024	7LAY08	3.69
Amir, who turns out to be a survivor of the devastating apartment fire Bobby inadvertently caused in Minnesota during the throes of his addiction, appears at Bobby's AA meeting. His talk compels Bobby to try and make amends. When Amir is attacked and wounded by a drug cartel during a relief movement in Jacumba, Bobby sets out to rescue him while grappling with painful boyhood memories of his father, a decorated firefighter whose own drinking and abusive behavior cost him his career, his family, and finally his life. After the two narrowly evade capture by the cartel and are rescued by the relief workers, Amir affirms that, while appreciative of his aid, he does not forgive Bobby.
105	9	"Ashes, Ashes"	Christine Khalafian	Andrew Meyers & Juan Carlos Coto	May 23, 2024	7LAY09	4.54
The 118 and Tommy are awarded medals of valor for their roles in the cruise ship rescue. Bobby is also surprised with one but declines it, later telling Fire Chief Simpson that he plans to retire. This is met with fierce opposition from Athena, who recruits Amir to help him. Initially willing, Amir leaves after seeing the life Bobby has rebuilt following the tragedy. After Eddie confesses to Kim about Shannon, she later shows up dressed as Shannon to try to help Eddie process his unresolved grief. The two embrace just as Christopher and Marisol enter and see. At the same time, in an act of revenge against Hen for her son’s death, Councilwoman Ortiz cancels Mara's adoption hearing, strips the Wilsons of their foster license, and has Mara removed from their household. Later, after being taunted by his father in a dream, Bobby awakes to his house on fire and he saves Athena before suffering a heart attack.
106	10	"All Fall Down"	John J. Gray	Kristen Reidel & Lyndsey Beaulieu	May 30, 2024	7LAY10	5.19
Christopher gives Eddie the cold shoulder and calls his grandparents to come from Texas, deciding to go stay with them. Athena believes Amir to be the perpetrator of the house fire, but discovers it is actually the cartel, out for revenge after Amir and Bobby's escape and the inadvertent death of one of their members in Jacumba. Athena saves Amir, and when Bobby recovers, he has a heart-to-heart with Amir. Maddie and Chimney foster Mara while Hen and Karen work on regaining their license. Bobby returns to the firehouse but the 118 are met with former captain Vincent Gerrard, who announces Bobby’s retirement plans and that he himself will be taking over as captain, much to everyone's dismay.

=== Season 8 (2024–25) ===
No. overall	No. in season	Title	Directed by	Written by	Original release date	Prod. code	U.S. viewers (millions)
107	1	"Buzzkill"	James Wong	Molly Green & James Leffler	September 26, 2024	8LAY01	4.93
Hen and Karen make progress with regaining their foster license as Mara continues to stay with Maddie and Chimney. Buck and Tommy help Eddie throw a virtual birthday party for Christopher, who remains in Texas. Christopher is disinterested, much to Eddie's dismay. Bobby is now a technical advisor for firefighting TV show Hotshots; he is undermined by production, but idolized by the lead actor, Brad Torrence. A truck carrying 22 million killer bees crashes downtown, threatening the lives of a mother and daughter and, later, the attendees of a perfume party. The team, and Buck in particular, struggle with Gerrard's leadership. Buck later saves Gerrard from a construction accident, knocking him unconscious in the process. Meanwhile, Athena escorts her first fiancé's killer, Dennis Jenkins ("Athena Begins"), to L.A. so he can testify in a trafficking case in exchange for freedom. En route, she detains a fake officer who tries to take custody of Dennis; Dennis reveals someone wants him dead. They board an L.A.-bound plane which, due to the bees obstructing visibility, is violently crashed into by another plane.
108	2	"When the Boeing Gets Tough..."	Bradley Buecker	Ted Griffin & Tim Minear	October 3, 2024	8LAY02	4.92
Before the planes collide, Dennis tells Athena why he is being targeted. The collision kills the pilots of both planes and creates two holes in Athena's — one in the cockpit incapacitating the co-pilot and another in the back of the fuselage. While Gerrard is taken to the hospital, the 118, via phone call, aids the plane's passengers in treating casualties. Athena attempts to fly the plane herself with the help of flight instructors on the ground and a young aviation enthusiast onboard. Meanwhile, all fire stations are directed to LAX; Buck travels there separately after retrieving Bobby (with Brad tagging along) from their show's set in a prop fire truck.
109	3	"Final Approach"	Bradley Buecker	Tim Minear & Ted Griffin	October 10, 2024	8LAY03	5.52
The plane's rudder becomes damaged, removing its ability to turn which eliminates LAX as a landing option; Athena instead aims for the 110 freeway, with Buck, Brad, and Bobby clearing part of it in preparation. The plane is successfully landed, but a fire breaks out while the passengers are disembarking, threatening Athena who stayed behind to perform CPR on the copilot. The fire stations arrive, with the 118 and Bobby extinguishing the fire and rescuing Athena. Afterwards, Bobby, Athena, and Dennis seek out a hidden book that details the trafficker's associates. A crooked detective is revealed to be involved, he attempts to shoot Bobby but Dennis takes the bullet and subdues the detective. Athena passes the book to trusted investigators and later has a heart-to-heart with Dennis. Lastly, Gerrard returns to the 118 and is uncharacteristically beholden towards Buck, much to everyone's surprise and confusion.
110	4	"No Place Like Home"	Marita Grabiak	Lyndsey Beaulieu	October 17, 2024	8LAY04	4.16
Athena makes plans to rebuild her and Bobby's house. Gerrard, who has taken a reluctant Buck under his wing, prepares to lay off many firefighters due to budget issues and mandates all firefighters wear bodycams. Emergencies include a cheerleader with a twisted pelvis and a pet tiger attacking its owner's landlord. Eddie, missing Christopher, confronts the cheerleader's absent father, helping repair their relationship. Mara risks being returned to a group home due to continued contact with Hen and Karen revealed through interference from Councilwoman Olivia Ortiz. She is revealed to be the one who reassigned Gerrard to the 118, but her plan to close the 118 and her reputation is ruined after Bobby convinces Gerrard to use his bodycam to expose her. Mara is reunited with the Wilsons and Bobby returns to the 118 as captain, with Gerrard taking on his technical advisor role.
111	5	"Masks"	Christine Khalafian	Taylor Wong	October 24, 2024	8LAY05	3.98
Karen is upset Hen cannot be present over Halloween due to work, Hen commiserates with Eddie and Chimney about missing their kids in varying ways. Athena lectures a classroom about Halloween road safety, but is disrupted by dismissive students. Buck unknowingly decorates the 118 Haunt Fest with a real corpse and terrifies a group of children by dislocating its left shoulder. He later dislocates his own during a subsequent call, and when recuperating at home with Tommy, learns the corpse was once a boil-covered cowboy Billy Boils who was betrayed by his own posse. The next morning, Buck awakes covered in boils, which, coupled with his injury, leads him to believe he has been cursed; Eddie and Tommy remain skeptical. On Halloween, Athena and the 118 deal with various inoffensive calls before responding to a car accident brought on by a man who chased two students via car after they egged his home; the crash kills the man and pins Denny against a house. Denny's heart stops, but a blood transfusion from Karen and CPR from Hen saves his life. Hen and Karen reconcile at the hospital. Buck and Tommy visit the grave of Billy Boils with Buck aiming to "lift the curse" by highlighting the importance of having people in your life.
112	6	"Confessions"	Chad Lowe	Andrew Meyers	November 7, 2024	8LAY06	4.16
While on a date, Tommy reveals to Buck that he was previously engaged to Abby Clark while he was still closeted; Buck seeks out Maddie's advice, Josh gives his perspective as a gay man. Eddie attends confession and expresses his guilt concerning Christopher, but rejects the priest's suggestions of penance. Maddie suggests the prospect of a second child to Chimney, who is apprehensive due to the severity of Maddie's prior post-partum depression. Emergencies include a deranged wife stealing her mother-in-law's ashes, a cheating man sneezing his guts out, and a young boy who aids the rescue of his little brother from a hole in the ground. The latter emergency warms Chimney to Maddie's suggestions; Maddie reveals that she is already pregnant. Buck discloses his past relationship with Abby to Tommy and asks Tommy to move in with him; Tommy instead ends their relationship over fears of Buck would break his heart unintentionally. Eddie allows himself to dance around his home in a show of self-liberation. A dejected Buck comes over to Eddie's following his breakup to drink together.
113	7	"Hotshots"	Keith Tripler	Lyndsey Beaulieu & Aisha Casey	November 14, 2024	8LAY07	4.01
Buck bakes excessively as a way to dissuade himself from contacting Tommy; he deduces Maddie's pregnancy during a dinner with her and Chimney. Athena injures her leg while intercepting a gang robbery and is subsequently assigned an assistant rookie officer, Matthew Sparks. Her concerns about Sparks are proven correct when he shoots an unarmed motorist during a call. Athena decides to apply for a rookie of her own afterwards so she can train better. Chief Simpson implores Bobby to help Gerrard after an injury to a stunt performer, and it becomes clear Brad sabotaged him because he preferred working with Bobby. Bobby tries to talk sense into Brad, but ends up going viral for aggressively admonishing him after he mistreats a waitress. This humbles Brad but also adding to his admiration for Bobby, requesting to shadow him at the 118.
114	8	"Wannabes"	Bradley Buecker	Molly Green & James Leffler	November 21, 2024	8LAY08	4.60
Athena is called to a parking lot where a vigilante named Graham, self-dubbed "The Cart Cop," (Note: Modeled from the activities of the YouTube channel, Cart Narcs) has made it his mission to shame people who refuse to return their carts to the corral. Eddie considers moving to El Paso to be closer to Christopher. The 118 responds to a multi-car accident due to a wastewater explosion in the street and rescues a couple stuck in their car filling up with water. Brad, desperate to help, carries an unconscious woman out of her car, but gets admonished by Bobby for moving a patient without a C-collar and is reminded that he is an observer, not a member of the team. Later, the 118 is dispatched to help a man who has recently been laid off, is separated from his wife, and is contemplating suicide. When he spots Brad on the scene, Bobby asks him to help. The two of them make a pact to stay alive, though Brad's commitment is on behalf of his Hotshots character Captain Race Banner and fulfilling his promise, he returns to Hotshots.
115	9	"Sob Stories"	Bradley Buecker	Teleplay by : Tim Minear & Rashad Raisani; Story by : Tim Minear & Rashad Raisani & Matt Solik	March 6, 2025	8LAY09	4.66
The 118 responds to an animal shelter on fire, with Buck becoming attached to a dog he rescues. When a distressed killer calls 911 after taking a child hostage, Maddie teams up with Athena and Amber Braeburn, a detective that specializes in child kidnappings, to help track down the suspect. The suspect apparently commits suicide on call, with the girl being rescued. Meanwhile, Buck struggles to come to terms with Eddie leaving Los Angeles. After Buck inadvertently sabotages each meeting with potential subletters, he decides to sublet Eddie's home himself and they reconcile. Later that night, Maddie is drugged and kidnapped from her own home by Amber, who reveals herself to be the real killer.
116	10	"Voices"	Jennifer Lynch	Ted Griffin & Molly Savard	March 13, 2025	8LAY10	4.21
Chimney returns home with Buck to find Maddie missing and fears her PPD has returned, and the 118 help look for her. Maddie wakes up restrained in Amber's basement, and she stalls for time, using what she learns about Amber's own experience being kidnapped as a child. When Chimney shows up at the house, Amber slashes Maddie's throat and is about to attack Chimney before a bleeding Maddie pushes her aside and Athena arrives, killing Amber. Maddie is treated at the hospital, and she and Chimney find out they are having a baby boy. Buck helps Eddie pack up his things and they say goodbye.
117	11	"Holy Mother of God"	Aisha Hinds	Taylor Wong & Darek Cioch	March 20, 2025	8LAY11	4.76
During an emergency at a church, Bobby has a tense reunion with his estranged mother Ann, a traveling faith healer, and older brother, Charlie. They eventually reconcile after Bobby learns she has metastatic cancer and she comes clean about her condition to her followers. Meanwhile, Buck struggles to settle into Eddie's house, Maddie suggests he make new friends, and Buck takes Ravi out for drinks. Ravi brings Tommy over to Buck, and they hook up. The following morning they express interest in rekindling their relationship, but after Tommy expresses his belief that Buck's feelings were focused elsewhere, the conversation grows tense and Tommy leaves. Later, Maddie encourages that he needs to adjust to being alone and he then finally unpacks. Athena gets a call on the police radio about a bank robber about to take a voyage on a cruise ship called The Odyssey. Note: This episode begins a crossover event that concludes on Doctor Odyssey season 1 episode 11.
118	12	"Disconnected"	Tessa Blake	Molly Green & James Leffler	March 27, 2025	8LAY12	5.04
After a nightmare, Maddie goes back to work trying to reclaim normalcy, but she loses her voice while on a call as the result of psychological trauma. Chimney and Athena offer support for Maddie, with Athena reassuring her that her voice will come back in its own time. Later at the park, Maddie panics when she loses sight of Jee-Yun and regains her voice to call out for her daughter. Meanwhile, in El Paso, despite a glowing recommendation from Bobby, the fire department cannot offer Eddie a job due to a hiring freeze. In dire need of money, Eddie trades in his truck for a sedan and picks up gig work as a rideshare driver. He lets Chris and his parents think he is still working as a firefighter until Chris catches him in the lie when he gets a ride with his friends. Chris later tells Eddie he's still proud of him and that he wants his dad in his life. Emergencies include a structure fire and a car overhanging the edge of a parking garage.
119	13	"Invisible"	Brenna Malloy	Lyndsey Beaulieu & Taylor Wong	April 3, 2025	8LAY15	4.13
On Hen's birthday, everyone around her has forgotten the date and she feels like no one is seeing her. She empathizes with Archie, a victim of several accidents throughout the day where he was unnoticed or forgotten, and gives him a pep talk about taking up space in the world. Overwhelmed by the events of the day, Archie takes a city bus hostage with a kitchen knife and unintentionally injures another passenger. When the 118 arrives on the scene, Hen talks Archie into letting the hostages go and saves him when cops mistakenly think he's pulling a gun. She goes home to a birthday celebration and says it's her best birthday yet. Meanwhile, Eddie is frustrated that Ramon is taking Chris out of town for a chess tournament. During the tournament, Eddie steps in to help when Chris is sick from the stress. While cleaning up, Chris admits that he dislikes chess and was only playing for Ramon. To Chris's relief, Eddie tells him that he's moving back in with him and then breaks the news to his parents.
120	14	"Sick Day"	Karla Braun	Lyndsey Beaulieu & Taylor Wong	April 10, 2025	8LAY13	4.47
The 118 responds to a multi-vehicle pileup; Ravi makes a mistake and contemplates quitting the 118 until Buck encourages him against it. Later, scientist Moira Blake is fired from her job after dangerously speeding up the incubation period for Crimean-Congo hemorrhagic fever to create an antiviral; enraged, she steals a keycard before setting the lab on fire. The 118 is dispatched to the fire where an explosion traps everyone but Buck in the lab and aerosolizes the virus; Hen suffers a collapsed lung and Chimney's mask is destroyed, exposing him to the virus. Isolating himself, Chimney successfully guides Bobby through an emergency thoracotomy on Hen, but begins exhibiting symptoms of the illness shortly after. The 118 learns from Athena the antiviral Moira made could save him; despite warnings from the U.S. Army, Ravi locates the freezer where the antiviral is located, but finds that Moira has taken the vial.
121	15	"Lab Rats"	Dawn Wilkinson	Kristen Reidel & Molly Green & James Leffler	April 17, 2025	8LAY14	3.81
Athena and Buck secretly track Moira to a big pharma company where she arrests Moira and Buck calls Tommy for help to evade the Army and FBI , who want to research the antidote rather than use it for Chimney. Tommy flies a helicopter with Buck and Moira as a distraction, allowing Athena to get the antiviral to Chimney with Karen's help. Meanwhile, Bobby saves Ravi when he briefly runs out of oxygen using the tubes in the lab. Chimney begins suffering organ failure as he enters Stage 2 of the infection, with the team stabilizing him via a saline solution until Athena arrives with the antiviral. Bobby cures Chimney and signals for the Army to let them out of quarantine. As Buck leads the rest of the team to safety, Bobby shuts the door and reveals that in the explosion he was exposed to the virus when his oxygen tank was compromised. Bobby knew this, but chose to keep quiet so that Chimney could be saved with the one dose of antiviral. Athena is able to say a last goodbye to him, where he tells her how much she means to him before he dies.
122	16	"The Last Alarm"	John J. Gray	Tim Minear & Kristen Reidel	May 1, 2025	8LAY16	4.80
The community mourns Bobby's death, with Athena throwing herself into her work while Hen attempts to comfort her on Bobby's passing. She investigates a woman's belief that her baby who died eight years ago is still out there, but she finds proof the baby did die. The 118 try to cope with losing their captain as the LAFD brass prepare to find a successor to Bobby. Eddie returns to Los Angeles for Bobby's funeral and expresses his guilt for not being there at the lab. The first responders offering final salutes and goodbyes at Bobby's funeral procession, before Bobby is flown home to St. Paul to be buried next to Marcy, Robert Jr., and Brooke. Athena, May, and Harry say goodbye one last time as Bobby is laid to rest.
123	17	"Don't Drink the Water"	Jonathan Lawrence	Molly Green & James Leffler	May 8, 2025	8LAY17	3.99
Eddie admits to Hen and Karen that he received a job offer from the El Paso Fire Department and is struggling to tell Buck about it. Buck finds out and the two get into an argument where Eddie explains to Buck what it was like receiving the phone call that Bobby had died. Feeling bad about their argument, Eddie flies in Christopher to cheer Buck up and brings over his aunt who talks to Buck about his grief. Athena tells Hen she would be the best fit to replace Bobby as captain, but Hen is unsure about the idea. Athena also struggles with being able to forgive Chimney after Bobby sacrificed himself for him. May and Harry advise Athena to sell the house she and Bobby built. After an earthquake hits Los Angeles, fires begin to break out from water sources, with the 118 responding to several calls. Athena reconnects with Graham (aka Cart Cop) and helps him with a feud at an apartment building. The flammable water causes an explosion, which collapses the apartment building.
124	18	"Seismic Shifts"	John J. Gray	Kristen Reidel & Molly Savard	May 15, 2025	8LAY18	4.05
Before the collapse, the 118 hosts a goodbye lunch for Eddie, where Hen gifts him his 118 turnouts. Hen also admits she turned down the offer to become captain and Buck says he put in for a transfer from the 118, feeling it is no longer the same without Bobby. At the apartment building site, Athena tries to help Graham and another civilian who has been crushed by the debris. The 118 arrives on scene and quickly becomes overwhelmed after the building suffers another collapse. Eddie, seeing the event on the news, puts on his old turnouts and arrives at the scene to help. Chimney, hearing Athena has been trapped in the building, goes in by himself to help her get out; they learn Graham was impaled, but said nothing because the other civilian, who he previously had been feuding with, needed their help more. This causes Athena to accept what Bobby did for Chimney and the two reconcile after the team saves Graham. Back at the firehouse, Chimney tells Eddie he is not living in Texas anymore and tells Buck he's not transferring, making a speech about keeping the importance of Bobby's legacy alive. After the speech, Hen slips up and refers to Chimney as "Cap." Hen and Karen formally adopt Mara, Eddie and Christopher move back to Los Angeles and begin unpacking boxes, Buck starts looking for a new apartment now that Eddie is back, Athena begins work on selling the house, and Maddie gives birth to her son. Upon Athena arriving at the hospital, Chimney tells her they named the baby Robert Nash Han, after Bobby.

=== Season 9 (2025–26) ===
No. overall	No. in season	Title	Directed by	Written by	Original release date	Prod. code	U.S. viewers (millions)
125	1	"Eat the Rich"	Jennifer Lynch	Molly Green & James Leffler	October 9, 2025	9LAY01	4.22
The team at the 118 dedicates the firehouse in honor of Bobby's sacrifice. Athena tries to navigate life without Bobby by distracting herself with work, which begins to affect her children when it is revealed that she missed certain details, such as Harry dropping out of high school. Buck begins to feel jealous of Eddie and Hen's new partnership at work. Amidst controversy, Tripp Hauser, CEO of the tech and space company Techtonyx, gets trapped in the mouth of a whale. The 118 saves Tripp, and Hen resuscitates him; in gratitude, Tripp invites Hen to go on a space mission with one other person, in exchange for $5 million to fund the firehouse. She initially invites Karen, but she refuses as her company is in a lawsuit against Tripp; after several attempts by the other 118 members to be her plus one, Hen decides to bring Athena along. Emergencies featured include an antifreeze leak on a bus and a reclusive woman seemingly dying after a bacterial infection.
126	2	"Spiraling"	Bradley Buecker	Molly Green & James Leffler	October 16, 2025	9LAY02	3.76
Athena joins Hen on the Macronova Inara II space mission, which Tripp has also invited his girlfriend Tricia, solar panel company CEO Parker, and football coach and former Apollo 18 astronaut Lewis aboard. Tripp is informed that a radiation flare is forming, which has a 43.7% chance of causing a geomagnetic storm, but Tripp goes through with the mission anyway. The geomagnetic storm occurs shortly after the pod reaches orbit, with the team narrowly avoiding spinning out of orbit thanks to Parker rebooting the system. Karen talks with her coworker in order to establish contact with the capsule. The 118 are called on tactical duty, with Harry accompanying them as they deal with a man stuck in a malfunctioning self-driving car and an out-of-control medical robot. All the while, the storm causes Tripp's satellites to collide with each other and become meteors heading towards LA. Karen manages to link Tripp up with the capsule, who gives them instructions on how to get back to Earth. However, as they are approaching, a fire breaks out.
127	3	"The Sky Is Falling"	Bradley Buecker	Tim Minear & Kristen Reidel	October 23, 2025	9LAY03	4.02
Athena and Hen extinguish the fire by venting the oxygen out into space after all of them put on spacesuits, but they lose their emergency hatch. Meanwhile, Maddie, Karen and their colleagues are trying to figure out to make contact to the Inara II crew. Tripp abandons the crew and says in a press conference that everyone aboard died in order to cover up his fault. The 118 team rescues all the passengers from a stuck underground train caused by a meteor, except for a man named Cal's wife Lori, whose right leg is stuck under concrete. The rescue mission worsens when water gushes from a broken pipe, flooding the train where Lori is trapped. Karen and her colleagues eventually re-establish contact with the Inara II crew, with help from Nashville Emergency Services and assist them in reaching the International Space Station. Lewis manages to successfully navigate the craft over to the ISS. Meanwhile, May begins to help people injured from the geomagnetic storm at the firehouse. After getting Cal's permission, Chimney is forced to amputate Lori's leg and sends her to the hospital. Onboard the ISS, Hen helps an unconscious astronaut aboard who informs her that the ISS has been struck three times by debris. However, the ISS gets struck by a fourth debris field shortly after.
128	4	"Reentry"	Bradley Buecker	Tim Minear & Molly Green & James Leffler	October 30, 2025	9LAY05	3.76
In order to get back to Earth, the team needs to free the Soyuz escape capsule on the ISS, which can only be done by fixing the robot arm. Hen initially volunteers, but Athena chooses to go, believing she has nothing left to live for. As she fixes the arm, Athena recalls a day in her past when she and her mentor stopped a bank robbery at the cost of her mentor's life. Athena nearly dies after her regulator is damaged, but after a talk with her past self, she is saved by Hen. As the Inara II crew and the injured astronaut get aboard the Soyuz, Lewis stays behind in order to operate the robotic arm and make sure everyone escapes safely. Everyone makes it back safely on Earth, where Tricia leaves Tripp for Parker, with whom she bonded while on the ISS. Lewis is revealed to have survived and teaches his football team from space. Hen and Athena reunite with their families, with Harry telling his mother he wants to join the 118 as a firefighter.
129	5	"Día de los Muertos"	Keith Tripler	Christopher Monfette & M. E. Savard	November 6, 2025	9LAY04	3.98
A man wearing a headless horseman costume accidentally crashes his car into a man with a scarecrow on Halloween. The 118 accidentally mistake the scarecrow for the person the driver hit, while the man gains walking dead syndrome and walks around believing he is dead. Eventually, the 118 are able to find the man at a funeral and successfully convince him he is not dead. Meanwhile, Buck believes that Bobby's ghost is in his house after he finds the secret ingredient (cream of tartar) to Bobby's cookies after hearing something. However, it turns out to be a man named Dwayne, who was the previous owner of the house who was evicted. After finding an AA pin in the attic, Buck drops charges against Dwayne and convinces him to stay sober. Athena catches Harry wearing Bobby's uniform and scolds him, but later reconciles. Meanwhile, Eddie has begun attending church again but is reluctant to go all-in, to his abuela's concern. Eddie later learns that his abuela has died of old age, and at a Day of the Dead celebration, he honors her, Shannon, and Bobby. Emergencies featured include a giant runaway inflatable pumpkin and an abused girl named Abigail biting a priest at an exorcism due to tetanus.
130	6	"Family History"	Maggie Kiley	Taylor Wong	November 13, 2025	9LAY06	3.65
Chimney is confused about whom he should pick from three candidates to replace him as interim captain. Instead, Maddie convinces Chimney that he should be the official captain. The 118 team responds to a Miller family reunion where they badly tear their fingers apart after doing tug of war. Harry asks Buck to help him prepare for the CPAT and interviews so he can be accepted as a firefighter, and Buck agrees. Athena responds to and helps an overdosed daughter named Alicia, who took all the pills in the bottle because of cyberbullying. Athena further investigates the case and interviews all of the daughter’s friends. Meanwhile, the 118 is called to Luna, a medical spa, where a woman named Kelsey gets anaphylaxis and later dies due to severe allergic reaction to a contrast agent. During the emergency, Dr. Brett notices Hen’s hands are trembling when she is helping Kelsey. Later at her house, Hen suddenly becomes paralyzed and collapses to the floor for hours. Athena tracks the cyberbully’s phone and it is revealed that the cyberbully is Alicia’s own mother, Cynthia. Cynthia attempts suicide after being exposed, but is stopped by Athena. Although Harry fails his interview at first because he attacked a racist in the past in self-defense, Buck encourages Harry to talk to Chief Simpson about why he deserves a second chance. Chief Simpson approves him. The next morning, Chimney is officially inaugurated as the captain of the 118. Hen returns to Luna to undergo a CT scan.
131	7	"Secrets"	John J. Gray	Lyndsey Beaulieu	January 8, 2026	9LAY07	3.86
Hen has secretly been undergoing weekly medical treatment for three months, hiding it from everyone. When Karen discovers the truth, she urges Hen to tell Chimney and prioritize her health. Meanwhile, the 118 team responds to several emergencies, including a boss injured by wearing a chastity belt and a woman who has cryptic pregnancy and gives birth. Buck encourages Eddie to start dating again, but during a night out, Buck accidentally attracts the attention of both Jade and Zane instead of finding a date for Eddie. After going on separate dates with them, Buck learns they are married and practice Ethical Non-Monogamy (ENM). Buck gently declines their invitation to be their third. Hen is about to tell Chimney about her condition when the fire alarm rings, interrupting her. During a major apartment fire, Hen pushes herself to rescue a seven-year-old girl but collapses afterward. At the hospital, Chimney feels upset and confronts Hen for hiding her condition and, feeling betrayed as her captain, removes her from the 118 team.
132	8	"War"	Dawn Wilkinson	Molly Green & James Leffler & Silas Savard	January 15, 2026	9LAY08	4.12
Chaos erupts at dispatch, when a new AI software goes rogue, almost killing a man. Athena gets upset at Chimney for firing Hen, and recommends they talk things through. Emergencies include a stolen Maserati and a PTSD outburst in a grocery store. The 118 decides to visit Hen in the hospital and find out she has dermatomyositis, which is incurable.
133	9	"Fighting Back"	Tessa Blake	Kristen Reidel & Lyndsey Beaulieu	January 22, 2026	9LAY09	4.40
The team gives it their all to help Hen with her autoimmune disease, but two months later it becomes so bad, making her handicapped in a wheelchair. Karen decides it's best she spends money on a caretaker for Hen. He ends up collapsing in front of Hen, and she calls for help, saving the man's life. Harry lets his fear of heights get in the way while training to become a firefighter. While climbing up to try to save a fake person from a ladder he ends up falling, and getting hospitalized with minor injuries. He receives a second chance, and in the end he is able to pass the test, becoming the newest member of the 118. Emergencies include a breakout of seizures in a fast food restaurant, and a young man who tries to steal a lady's purse, but ends up getting jumped himself.
134	10	"Handle with Care"	Bradley Buecker	Christopher Monfette & Taylor Wong	January 29, 2026	9LAY10	4.55
Chimney begins to envision gruesome moments of how Harry can get himself injured or killed on 911 calls. Being paranoid, he decides it's best he stays at the station while they respond to some calls, which he doesn't mind and understands. Hen and Eddie go to court over Abigail, a girl they saved previously ( "Dia de los Muertos"). Abigail visits the firehouse to get away from her parents Ken and Lydia. Alex Doyle, a mental assessment agent, offers Abigail housing in Pasadena. Later on, Abigail shows up at Eddie's doorstep for dinner, and she later tells him her parents got acquitted before leaving. Chimney explains to Harry about how he was leaving him out from the calls, saying that his best friend died trying to save a pregnant woman from an apartment fire. The alarm goes off, and Chimney tells Harry he can come with the rest of the team as they respond to a garage truck on fire. Harry sets up cones and the rest of the team deal with the fire. The cars begin passing through the cones and Chimney begins to panic. A car that happens to be going straight for Chimney almost hits him, but Harry manages to push him out just in time. The team later congratulates him, and Chimney officially welcomes Harry into the 118. At Christopher's school, Abigail meets up with Christopher, saying that Eddie sent her to pick him up, and takes him to her car. Emergencies include a house fire, and an elderly man on a lawnmower, whose son thinks he's gone missing.
135	11	"Going Once, Going Twice"	Aisha Hinds	Molly Green & James Leffler	February 26, 2026	9LAY11	4.08
The 118 hosts a charity bachelor auction at the firehouse. Buck is hesitant to participate, worried he has passed his prime, though Maddie is able to encourage him to get out there once more. As Hen and Karen discuss Hen's return to the 118, they get into a car accident; though they are uninjured, Hen's quick thinking allows everyone involved to get out safely, inspiring her to come back. The 118 responds to an elderly woman who drives her car through her friend's house unintentionally after she accidentally mistakes the accelerator for the brake. Eddie, realizing Christopher was nowhere to be found at his school, arrives home and finds him safely with Abigail, who dropped him off. However, due to the false alarm that his son was missing, he tells Abigail to leave and never come back. Later, he begins receiving threats from a mysterious figure, leading him to grow concerned for Abigail. He takes these concerns to Athena, who is able to track Abigail to a hotel with her father Ken; Eddie is attacked but is soon able to subdue Ken and arrest him once more. At the auction, Buck is won over by the elderly women the 118 helped earlier, Eddie is won over by Maddie (at Eddie's own request that she bid on him), and Ravi is won over by May, who goes on a date with him shortly after.
136	12	"Dads and Cads"	Nimisha Mukerji	Christopher Monfette & Taylor Wong	March 5, 2026	9LAY12	4.20
Maddie and Buck are visited by their parents, and are surprised to learn that their parents are divorcing. Harry is horrified to walk in on May and Ravi after they were intimate; he's initially standoffish with them afterwards, though they later make amends and Harry gives May and Ravi his blessing to date. Buck and Eddie are invited to represent Los Angeles at a fire-fighting competition being held in Nashville. They initially believe that Chimney referred them, though they are surprised to learn that it was actually Bobby who referred them before his death. This is the first episode of a two-part crossover that concludes on 9-1-1: Nashville.
137	13	"Mother's Boy"	Jonathan Lawrence	Tim Minear	March 12, 2026	9LAY13	3.86
Buck and Eddie, stranded in Nashville after their flight is cancelled, decide to rent a car to get back in time for Hen's birthday party; however, they end up lost in New Mexico. At a diner, they get into an argument with locals that leads to them getting kicked out. As they’re trying to get back on route, they’re run off the road by a mysterious figure and end up crashing; when Eddie wakes up in the hospital, he's told Buck was not in the car with him. Buck is revealed to have been kidnapped by the waitress at the diner who believes him to be a replacement for her brain-dead son. As Eddie is suspected of killing Buck, he escapes from the hospital and retraces his steps to find him and make it back to LA in one piece. Eddie is able to find where Buck is being held just as Buck escapes; the two reunite, and the waitress is arrested. On their way home, they learn to their chagrin that Karen ended up surprising Hen with a trip to Napa, telling no one, so the surprise party ends up not having the birthday girl there.
138	14	"D.I.Y."	Shiri Appleby	Lyndsey Breaulieu & Silas Savard	March 19, 2026	9LAY14	4.28
Engaged couple Flynn and Tia (the latter of whom survived the plane accident that Athena landed previously) purchase an old home and attempt to fix it themselves; this leads to several incidents where the 118 is called to help them, and an eventual deterioration of their relationship. Meanwhile, Sue suffers a stroke at the dispatch center and is forced to take medical leave. She appoints Maddie as her replacement, much to the surprise of Maddie and Josh, who quits shortly after. May interviews for an internship at a law firm run by Gabi, Athena’s college friend, and rejects Athena’s offer to use her connections to help May. However, an incident at a hospital culminates in May impulsively destroying a patient’s blood sample and subsequently getting arrested. Though Athena bails her out, this incident costs her the internship with Gabi. Eddie worries about Buck’s dismissiveness of his trauma following his kidnapping, despite Buck’s affirmation that he’s fine. Maddie struggles with her first day as the manager of dispatch as well as guilt over Josh being passed over, a chat with Sue gives her confidence that it will get better, just as Josh returns to dispatch. Flynn and Tia soon break off their engagement, and faulty wiring results in their house burning down as they sit watching outside. At dinner with Athena, Hen, and Gabi, May admits she’s worried that she’s wasting her life, but the rest of the women reassure her that this is just the start of her story. At dinner with Buck and Chris, Eddie apologizes for prying and trusts Buck’s reassurance that he has it handled. However, once Eddie and Chris leave, Buck looks for a bottle of pills he has hidden and takes them.
139	15	"Pick Your Poison"	Christine Khalafian	Molly Green & James Leffler	March 26, 2026	9LAY15	4.79
A man arrives at the police station to report his own fatal poisoning, and Athena is partnered with a detective named Hooks to solve the case. Buck, who has developed an opioid dependency following the car accident in New Mexico, is flagged by a doctor who refuses to prescribe him more medication. He begins to suffer brutal withdrawal symptoms, and at one point even considers stealing medication from the ambulance, but ultimately puts them back when the alarm goes off. Ravi becomes jealous seeing May hang out with Ian, a nurse she previously encountered at the hospital; he admits to not having called May after misinterpreting a joke Harry had made about forbidding the relationship. May later clarifies that she is not dating Ian, but rather going to him for advice about a potential career as a nurse. Athena later gets the toxicology results for the poisoned man, revealing the culprit to be his own son, who resented his father for abandoning him for his own career. Buck comes clean to Chimney about his dependency and realizes that the anniversary of Bobby's death is coming up. The 118 later come together to help Buck through the rest of his detox. The episode ends with the team gathering around a fireplace, telling stories about Bobby, and toasting to his memory.
140	16	"Where There's Smoke"	Bradley Buecker	Kristen Reidel	April 2, 2026	9LAY16	4.07
Due to Buck being on leave, a rookie named Sam is recruited to fill his spot. The team gets called to the same building over and over throughout the day. Each time, everyone has to evacuate and by the final time, the residents of the building begin to riot against the firefighters. As the team is put on tribunal to see if Chimney should get fired over an altercation, they try to figure out why the smoke alarms kept going off. Studying previous calls, the team discovers a locked room filled with illegal immigrants in the basement who kept setting off the alarms to get out of the room. They manage to rescue all of them. Sam is later transferred to the 144, with Buck rejoining the 118.
141	17	"I Got You Babe"	John J. Gray	Christopher Monfette & Taylor Wong	April 30, 2026	9LAY17	3.97
After saving a 4-year-old boy named Theo from an electrical tower, Buck learns that Theo is the son of Connor and Kameron, for whom Buck was a sperm donor, meaning Theo is his biological son. Buck is shocked by Theo's energy when he invites the three of them over for dinner, and Connor and Kameron question him about whether it has anything to do with Buck's DNA. A few days later, the 118 responds to a car accident on a bridge where they find Connor and Kameron dead in one of the cars, with Theo surviving. Buck waits for Theo at the hospital and tells Maddie he is being placed in temporary housing while they try to locate his next of kin. Athena tries to find asylum for the immigrants and researches the men who locked them in the basement. Learning that Detective Hooks is involved, from Eddie and Hen, who have been helping the immigrants, Athena remains suspicious of him. However, as more evidence piles up, the criminal Castor family appears to have orchestrated everything. With a warrant, SWAT storms the Castor mansion, along with Athena and Hooks. Hooks shoots the patriarch and then Athena.
142	18	"Hearts and Flowers"	Bradley Buecker	Molly Green & James Leffler	May 7, 2026	9LAY18	4.46
Athena is rushed to the hospital at the same time the 118 bring in a patient. With Athena in a medically induced coma, Anatoly Castor stabs Eddie in the hospital rectory and shoots another man, sending the hospital into lockdown. Ravi and May hide Athena from Anatoly while Buck sneaks through the hospital to stop the shooter. Anatoly is caught, Hooks is arrested for working with the mob, and the 118 find Eddie bleeding out in the elevator and save him. While in her coma, Athena had visions of her former partner and decides after waking up to undergo a career change from sergeant to detective. Eddie sends Esteban, one of the immigrants who was having a difficult time finding housing, to go live with his parents in Texas. After a chat with Harry while at the 1st birthday party of Maddie and Chimney's son, Buck fills out the paperwork to begin fostering Theo and welcomes him home.

=== Season 10 (2026) ===
No. overall	No. in season	Title	Directed by	Written by	Original release date	Prod. code	U.S. viewers (millions)
143	1	"That Sinking Feeling"	Bradley Buecker	Molly Green & James Leffler	October 15, 2026	10LAY01	4.31
The 118 respond to a number of vehicles trapped in a sinkhole. Meanwhile, Athena deals with a mysterious case about an attempted murder involving a van dropping off a severely burned person and driving away. She tracks the vehicle to a construction site and notices another person injured. Realizing there is more than one victim involved, she returns to the station. Maddie, along with Chief Simpson, attend a meeting about how the sinkhole could have been prevented. The emergency office manager Ty tells Maddie to go through hundreds of calls from the area prior to the event. The 118 are called to a nearby aquarium of the sinkhole and notice the water pH seems to be low. Maddie gets dismissed by Ty after calling him in the middle of the night that she has found earlier calls from people experiencing nausea and the smell of sulfur. Eddie seems concerned with Buck's parenting choices in his guardianship of Theo. Athena's investigation of the construction crew uncovers a jewelry store vault which was robbed via tunnel, and she enters the tunnel to search more. When the 118 return to the sinkhole due to a strange buzzing noise coming from inside, the sinkhole erupts into a volcano, launching molten lava into the air.
144	2	"Fire in the Hole"	Bradley Buecker	Tim Minear & Kristen Reidel	October 22, 2026	10LAY02	4.25
The 118 begin extracting people from their cars after lava starts spreading into the city. Athena rescues two people from the rubble of the tunnel, one being her former rookie, Sparks. They try exiting but later get trapped by the lava. Ian gets upset at May for abandoning one of her patients out of fear, but later reconcile. Eddie is approached by a service dog and realizes that the owner is still trapped in his car. He finds the owner having a seizure but manages to save him on time. Buck is called at by a pregnant woman who is vulnerable to the lava, but with enough motivation given by Buck, they both make it out right before all the cars explode due to the nearby gas tanks. Hen and Harry are ordered by Chim to search an apartment after dispatch gets notified by a smartwatch that there has been a crash. They later find the owner, who is a doctor pinned by molten magma. Harry is told to let her go, but stays by her side in her final moments. Maddie makes a difficult choice.
145	3	"Streets of Fire"	Bradley Buecker	Molly Green & James Leffler	October 29, 2026	10LAY03	4.02
The 118 are forced to fight the flames once again. Sparks makes a daring leap of faith across the lava, almost getting him killed. After narrowly escaping death, he throws down a ladder for the rest of them to get across. Maddie has to find a way to redirect the lava away from a busy hospital. After deciding to reroute the lava to Union Square, she later finds out that is the area where Athena happens to be trapped in. The 118 is sent to look for Athena, after being alerted from a call box. They drill into the wall and successfully rescue Athena, Sparks, and Harvey, an elder who came along with Sparks at the beginning for a tunnel inspection. Buck and Eddie get into an argument about Theo's well being.
146	4	"Imposter Syndrome"	Keith Tripler	Taylor Wong	November 5, 2026	10LAY04	4.50
147	5	"Who's Your Daddy?"	James Wong	Lyndsey Beaulieu & Silas Savard	November 12, 2026	10LAY05	4.40
148	6	"Et Tu?"	Shiri Appleby	Christopher Monfette	November 19, 2026	10LAY06	TBD

== Ratings ==
=== Season 1 ===
Viewership and ratings per episode of List of 9-1-1 episodes
No.	Title	Air date	Rating/share (18–49)	Viewers (millions)	DVR (18–49)	DVR viewers (millions)	Total (18–49)	Total viewers (millions)
1	"Pilot"	January 3, 2018	1.8	6.83	1.2	3.87	3.0	10.69
2	"Let Go"	January 10, 2018	1.5	5.55	1.5	4.44	3.0	9.99
3	"Next of Kin"	January 17, 2018	1.8	6.21	1.2	4.00	3.0	10.21
4	"Worst Day Ever"	January 24, 2018	1.6	6.57	1.5	4.70	3.1	11.27
5	"Point of Origin"	January 31, 2018	1.6	6.21	1.5	4.37	3.1	10.58
6	"Heartbreaker"	February 7, 2018	1.7	6.64	1.5	4.76	3.2	11.40
7	"Full Moon (Creepy AF)"	February 28, 2018	1.5	5.95	1.5	4.67	3.0	10.62
8	"Karma's a Bitch"	March 7, 2018	1.6	6.05	1.4	4.60	3.0	10.65
9	"Trapped"	March 14, 2018	1.6	6.55	1.4	4.42	3.0	10.86
10	"A Whole New You"	March 21, 2018	1.7	6.63	1.4	4.54	3.1	11.17

=== Season 2 ===
Viewership and ratings per episode of List of 9-1-1 episodes
No.	Title	Air date	Rating/share (18–49)	Viewers (millions)	DVR (18–49)	DVR viewers (millions)	Total (18–49)	Total viewers (millions)
1	"Under Pressure"	September 23, 2018	2.6	9.83	1.0	3.51	3.6	13.34
2	"7.1"	September 24, 2018	1.6	6.60	1.2	4.20	2.8	10.81
3	"Help Is Not Coming"	October 1, 2018	1.5	6.09	1.3	4.54	2.8	10.63
4	"Stuck"	October 8, 2018	1.4	5.92	1.3	4.35	2.7	10.27
5	"Awful People"	October 15, 2018	1.4	5.88	1.2	4.21	2.6	10.09
6	"Dosed"	October 22, 2018	1.3	5.62	1.2	4.41	2.5	10.05
7	"Haunted"	October 29, 2018	1.4	5.63	1.1	4.34	2.5	9.97
8	"Buck, Actually"	November 5, 2018	1.2	5.59	1.1	4.34	2.3	9.90
9	"Hen Begins"	November 19, 2018	1.2	5.15	1.2	4.27	2.4	9.42
10	"Merry Ex-Mas"	November 26, 2018	1.4	6.15	1.1	4.23	2.5	10.38
11	"New Beginnings"	March 18, 2019	1.2	5.96	1.2	4.55	2.4	10.51
12	"Chimney Begins"	March 25, 2019	1.2	5.66	1.1	4.18	2.3	9.84
13	"Fight or Flight"	April 1, 2019	1.3	6.16	1.1	4.10	2.4	10.26
14	"Broken"	April 15, 2019	1.1	5.65	1.2	4.24	2.3	9.89
15	"Ocean's 9-1-1"	April 22, 2019	1.2	5.99	1.0	3.97	2.2	9.96
16	"Bobby Begins Again"	April 29, 2019	1.1	5.49	1.1	4.10	2.2	9.59
17	"Careful What You Wish For"	May 6, 2019	1.1	5.81	1.1	4.08	2.2	9.89
18	"This Life We Choose"	May 13, 2019	1.3	6.44	0.8	2.91	2.1	9.36

=== Season 3 ===
Viewership and ratings per episode of List of 9-1-1 episodes
No.	Title	Air date	Rating/share (18–49)	Viewers (millions)	DVR (18–49)	DVR viewers (millions)	Total (18–49)	Total viewers (millions)
1	"Kids Today"	September 23, 2019	1.6	7.14	1.2	3.84	2.8	10.99
2	"Sink or Swim"	September 30, 2019	1.6	7.48	1.0	3.68	2.6	11.15
3	"The Searchers"	October 7, 2019	1.7	7.34	1.0	3.65	2.7	11.01
4	"Triggers"	October 14, 2019	1.4	6.31	1.1	3.93	2.5	10.24
5	"Rage"	October 21, 2019	1.5	6.54	0.9	3.65	2.4	10.19
6	"Monsters"	October 28, 2019	1.3	6.26	1.0	3.81	2.3	10.07
7	"Athena Begins"	November 4, 2019	1.3	6.08	1.0	3.87	2.3	9.95
8	"Malfunction"	November 11, 2019	1.3	6.54	1.0	3.83	2.3	10.37
9	"Fallout"	November 25, 2019	1.3	6.14	1.0	4.02	2.3	10.16
10	"Christmas Spirit"	December 2, 2019	1.4	6.81	0.9	3.62	2.3	10.43
11	"Seize the Day"	March 16, 2020	1.4	6.97	0.9	3.68	2.3	10.66
12	"Fools"	March 23, 2020	1.4	7.03	0.8	3.12	2.2	10.15
13	"Pinned"	March 30, 2020	1.3	7.22	0.8	3.21	2.1	10.43
14	"The Taking of Dispatch 9-1-1"	April 13, 2020	1.5	7.63	0.7	3.04	2.2	10.67
15	"Eddie Begins"	April 20, 2020	1.2	6.84	0.9	3.38	2.1	10.23
16	"The One That Got Away"	April 27, 2020	1.2	6.81	0.8	3.24	2.0	10.05
17	"Powerless"	May 4, 2020	1.3	6.99	0.8	3.25	2.1	10.24
18	"What's Next?"	May 11, 2020	1.3	7.29	0.8	3.24	2.1	10.53

=== Season 4 ===
Viewership and ratings per episode of List of 9-1-1 episodes
No.	Title	Air date	Rating (18–49)	Viewers (millions)	DVR (18–49)	DVR viewers (millions)	Total (18–49)	Total viewers (millions)
1	"The New Abnormal"	January 18, 2021	1.2	7.19	0.5	2.61	1.7	9.80 (Note: Live+3 day ratings have been used due to the unavailability of Live+7 day ratings.)
2	"Alone Together"	January 25, 2021	1.2	7.21	—N/a	—N/a	—N/a	—N/a
3	"Future Tense"	February 1, 2021	1.0	6.77	0.6	2.72	1.6	9.49
4	"9-1-1, What's Your Grievance?"	February 8, 2021	1.1	6.86	0.7	3.31	1.8	10.19
5	"Buck Begins"	February 15, 2021	1.0	6.84	0.8	3.11	1.8	9.95
6	"Jinx"	February 22, 2021	1.1	6.73	0.7	3.39	1.8	10.12
7	"There Goes the Neighborhood"	March 1, 2021	1.1	6.40	0.7	3.33	1.8	9.73
8	"Breaking Point"	March 8, 2021	1.1	6.27	0.8	3.14	1.8	9.42
9	"Blindsided"	April 19, 2021	1.1	6.24	0.7	3.15	1.8	9.39
10	"Parenthood"	April 26, 2021	1.0	5.96	0.6	3.11	1.6	9.07
11	"First Responders"	May 3, 2021	1.0	6.12	0.7	2.88	1.6	8.79
12	"Treasure Hunt"	May 10, 2021	0.9	5.83	0.6	2.78	1.4	8.61
13	"Suspicion"	May 17, 2021	0.9	5.93	0.6	2.96	1.6	8.89
14	"Survivors"	May 24, 2021	1.1	6.35	0.6	2.75	1.7	9.10

=== Season 5 ===
Viewership and ratings per episode of List of 9-1-1 episodes
No.	Title	Air date	Rating (18–49)	Viewers (millions)	DVR (18–49)	DVR viewers (millions)	Total (18–49)	Total viewers (millions)
1	"Panic"	September 20, 2021	0.8	5.08	0.6	2.85	1.3	7.92
2	"Desperate Times"	September 27, 2021	0.9	5.45	0.4	2.26	1.3	7.71
3	"Desperate Measures"	October 4, 2021	0.9	5.25	0.4	2.30	1.3	7.55
4	"Home and Away"	October 11, 2021	0.9	5.25	0.6	2.85	1.4	8.11
5	"Peer Pressure"	October 18, 2021	0.8	5.28	0.6	2.84	1.4	8.12
6	"Brawl in Cell Block 9-1-1"	November 1, 2021	0.8	5.20	0.4	2.41	1.3	7.62
7	"Ghost Stories"	November 8, 2021	0.7	5.01	0.5	2.38	1.2	7.38
8	"Defend In Place"	November 15, 2021	0.7	5.11	0.6	2.95	1.3	8.07
9	"Past Is Prologue"	November 29, 2021	0.9	5.37	0.6	3.04	1.4	8.42
10	"Wrapped in Red"	December 6, 2021	0.8	5.39	—N/a	—N/a	—N/a	—N/a
11	"Outside Looking In"	March 21, 2022	0.8	5.37	0.5	2.98	1.3	8.31
12	"Boston"	March 28, 2022	0.7	4.97	0.5	2.56	1.2	7.53
13	"Fear-o-Phobia"	April 11, 2022	0.6	5.06	0.5	2.65	1.1	7.70
14	"Dumb Luck"	April 18, 2022	0.7	5.04	0.5	2.81	1.2	7.85
15	"FOMO"	April 25, 2022	0.7	5.08	0.5	2.66	1.2	7.75
16	"May Day"	May 2, 2022	0.7	5.12	—N/a	—N/a	—N/a	—N/a
17	"Hero Complex"	May 9, 2022	0.7	5.30	—N/a	—N/a	—N/a	—N/a
18	"Starting Over"	May 16, 2022	0.8	5.55	—N/a	—N/a	—N/a	—N/a

=== Season 6 ===
Viewership and ratings per episode of List of 9-1-1 episodes
No.	Title	Air date	Rating (18–49)	Viewers (millions)	DVR (18–49)	DVR viewers (millions)	Total (18–49)	Total viewers (millions)
1	"Let the Games Begin"	September 19, 2022	0.7	4.82	0.5	2.71	1.2	7.52
2	"Crash & Learn"	September 26, 2022	0.6	4.56	0.4	2.69	1.0	7.24
3	"The Devil You Know"	October 3, 2022	0.6	5.00	0.5	2.49	1.1	7.49
4	"Animal Instincts"	October 10, 2022	0.6	4.90	0.4	2.46	1.0	7.37
5	"Home Invasion"	October 17, 2022	0.6	4.97	0.5	2.43	1.1	7.40
6	"Tomorrow"	October 24, 2022	0.7	5.15	0.4	2.34	1.1	7.49
7	"Cursed"	November 7, 2022	0.7	5.09	0.5	2.67	1.1	7.76
8	"What's Your Fantasy?"	November 14, 2022	0.7	4.94	0.5	2.43	1.2	7.37
9	"Red Flag"	November 28, 2022	0.7	4.96	—N/a	—N/a	—N/a	—N/a
10	"In a Flash"	March 6, 2023	0.6	4.95	—N/a	—N/a	—N/a	—N/a
11	"In Another Life"	March 13, 2023	0.5	4.38	—N/a	—N/a	—N/a	—N/a
12	"Recovery"	March 20, 2023	0.6	4.41	—N/a	—N/a	—N/a	—N/a
13	"Mixed Feelings"	April 10, 2023	0.5	4.48	—N/a	—N/a	—N/a	—N/a
14	"Performance Anxiety"	April 17, 2023	0.5	4.46	—N/a	—N/a	—N/a	—N/a
15	"Death and Taxes"	April 24, 2023	0.5	4.53	—N/a	—N/a	—N/a	—N/a
16	"Lost & Found"	May 1, 2023	0.5	4.17	—N/a	—N/a	—N/a	—N/a
17	"Love Is in the Air"	May 8, 2023	0.5	4.48	—N/a	—N/a	—N/a	—N/a
18	"Pay It Forward"	May 15, 2023	0.6	4.32	—N/a	—N/a	—N/a	—N/a

=== Season 7 ===
Viewership and ratings per episode of List of 9-1-1 episodes
No.	Title	Air date	Rating (18–49)	Viewers (millions)	DVR (18–49)	DVR viewers (millions)	Total (18–49)	Total viewers (millions)
1	"Abandon 'Ships"	March 14, 2024	0.6	4.93	0.3	1.91	0.9	6.84
2	"Rock the Boat"	March 21, 2024	0.5	5.42	0.3	2.19	0.8	7.61
3	"Capsized"	March 28, 2024	0.6	5.53	0.3	2.05	0.8	7.58
4	"Buck, Bothered and Bewildered"	April 4, 2024	0.6	4.76	0.3	2.16	0.9	6.93
5	"You Don't Know Me"	April 11, 2024	0.6	4.61	—N/a	—N/a	—N/a	—N/a
6	"There Goes the Groom"	May 2, 2024	0.5	4.28	0.3	1.89	0.8	6.18
7	"Ghost of a Second Chance"	May 9, 2024	0.5	4.39	0.3	1.93	0.8	6.33
8	"Step Nine"	May 16, 2024	0.4	3.69	0.3	1.87	0.7	5.51
9	"Ashes, Ashes"	May 23, 2024	0.5	4.54	—N/a	—N/a	—N/a	—N/a
10	"All Fall Down"	May 30, 2024	0.6	5.19	—N/a	—N/a	—N/a	—N/a

=== Season 8 ===
Viewership and ratings per episode of List of 9-1-1 episodes
No.	Title	Air date	Rating (18–49)	Viewers (millions)	DVR (18–49)	DVR viewers (millions)	Total (18–49)	Total viewers (millions)	Ref.
1	"Buzzkill"	September 26, 2024	0.5	4.93	—N/a	—N/a	—N/a	—N/a	
2	"When the Boeing Gets Tough..."	October 3, 2024	0.4	4.92	—N/a	—N/a	—N/a	—N/a	
3	"Final Approach"	October 10, 2024	0.5	5.52	—N/a	—N/a	—N/a	—N/a	
4	"No Place Like Home"	October 17, 2024	0.4	4.16	0.2	1.94	0.6	6.10	
5	"Masks"	October 24, 2024	0.3	3.98	0.2	1.87	0.6	5.85	
6	"Confessions"	November 7, 2024	0.4	4.16	0.3	2.07	0.7	6.23	
7	"Hotshots"	November 14, 2024	0.3	4.01	0.3	1.92	0.6	5.93	
8	"Wannabes"	November 21, 2024	0.4	4.60	0.2	1.85	0.6	6.47	
9	"Sob Stories"	March 6, 2025	0.5	4.66	0.2	1.89	0.7	6.56	
10	"Voices"	March 13, 2025	0.4	4.21	0.2	1.69	0.6	5.90	
11	"Holy Mother of God"	March 20, 2025	0.4	4.76	0.2	1.84	0.6	6.60	
12	"Disconnected"	March 27, 2025	0.5	5.04	0.2	1.81	0.7	6.86	
13	"Invisible"	April 3, 2025	0.4	4.13	0.1	1.78	0.6	5.91	
14	"Sick Day"	April 10, 2025	0.4	4.47	0.2	1.67	0.6	6.14	
15	"Lab Rats"	April 17, 2025	0.4	3.81	0.2	1.82	0.5	5.63	
16	"The Last Alarm"	May 1, 2025	0.5	4.80	0.1	1.67	0.6	6.48	
17	"Don't Drink the Water"	May 8, 2025	0.4	3.99	0.6	1.86	0.6	5.85	
18	"Seismic Shifts"	May 15, 2025	0.4	4.05	0.1	1.69	0.5	5.74	

=== Season 9 ===
Viewership and ratings per episode of List of 9-1-1 episodes
No.	Title	Air date	Rating (18–49)	Viewers (millions)	DVR (18–49)	DVR viewers (millions)	Total (18–49)	Total viewers (millions)	Ref.
1	"Eat the Rich"	October 9, 2025	0.4	4.22	0.3	1.75	0.6	5.97	
2	"Spiraling"	October 16, 2025	0.3	3.76	0.2	1.59	0.5	5.35	
3	"The Sky is Falling"	October 23, 2025	0.4	4.02	0.2	1.50	0.6	5.52	
4	"Reentry"	October 30, 2025	0.3	3.76	0.1	1.18	0.4	4.94	
5	"Día de los Muertos"	November 6, 2025	0.4	3.98	0.1	0.96	0.5	4.94	
6	"Family History"	November 13, 2025	0.3	3.65	—N/a	—N/a	—N/a	—N/a	
7	"Secrets"	January 8, 2026	0.3	3.86	—N/a	—N/a	—N/a	—N/a	
8	"War"	January 15, 2026	0.4	4.12	—N/a	—N/a	—N/a	—N/a	
9	"Fighting Back"	January 22, 2026	0.3	4.40	—N/a	—N/a	—N/a	—N/a	
10	"Handle with Care"	January 29, 2026	0.4	4.55	—N/a	—N/a	—N/a	—N/a	
11	"Going Once, Going Twice"	February 26, 2026	0.3	4.08	—N/a	—N/a	—N/a	—N/a	
12	"Dads and Cads"	March 5, 2026	0.3	4.2	—N/a	—N/a	—N/a	—N/a	
13	"Mother's Boy"	March 12, 2026	0.3	3.9	—N/a	—N/a	—N/a	—N/a	
14	"D.I.Y."	March 19, 2026	0.3	4.28	—N/a	—N/a	—N/a	—N/a	
15	"Pick Your Poison"	March 26, 2026	—N/a	—N/a	—N/a	—N/a	—N/a	—N/a	
16	"Where There's Smoke"	April 2, 2026	—N/a	—N/a	—N/a	—N/a	—N/a	—N/a	
17	"I Got You Babe"	April 30, 2026	—N/a	—N/a	—N/a	—N/a	—N/a	—N/a	
18	"Hearts and Flowers"	May 7, 2026	—N/a	—N/a	—N/a	—N/a	—N/a	—N/a	

== See also ==
- List of 9-1-1: Lone Star episodes
