= CPAT =

CPAT could be an initialism for:

- Candidate Physical Ability Test
- Clwyd-Powys Archaeological Trust
- Customs-Trade Partnership Against Terrorism
