= Shopping cart theory =

Test of moral character

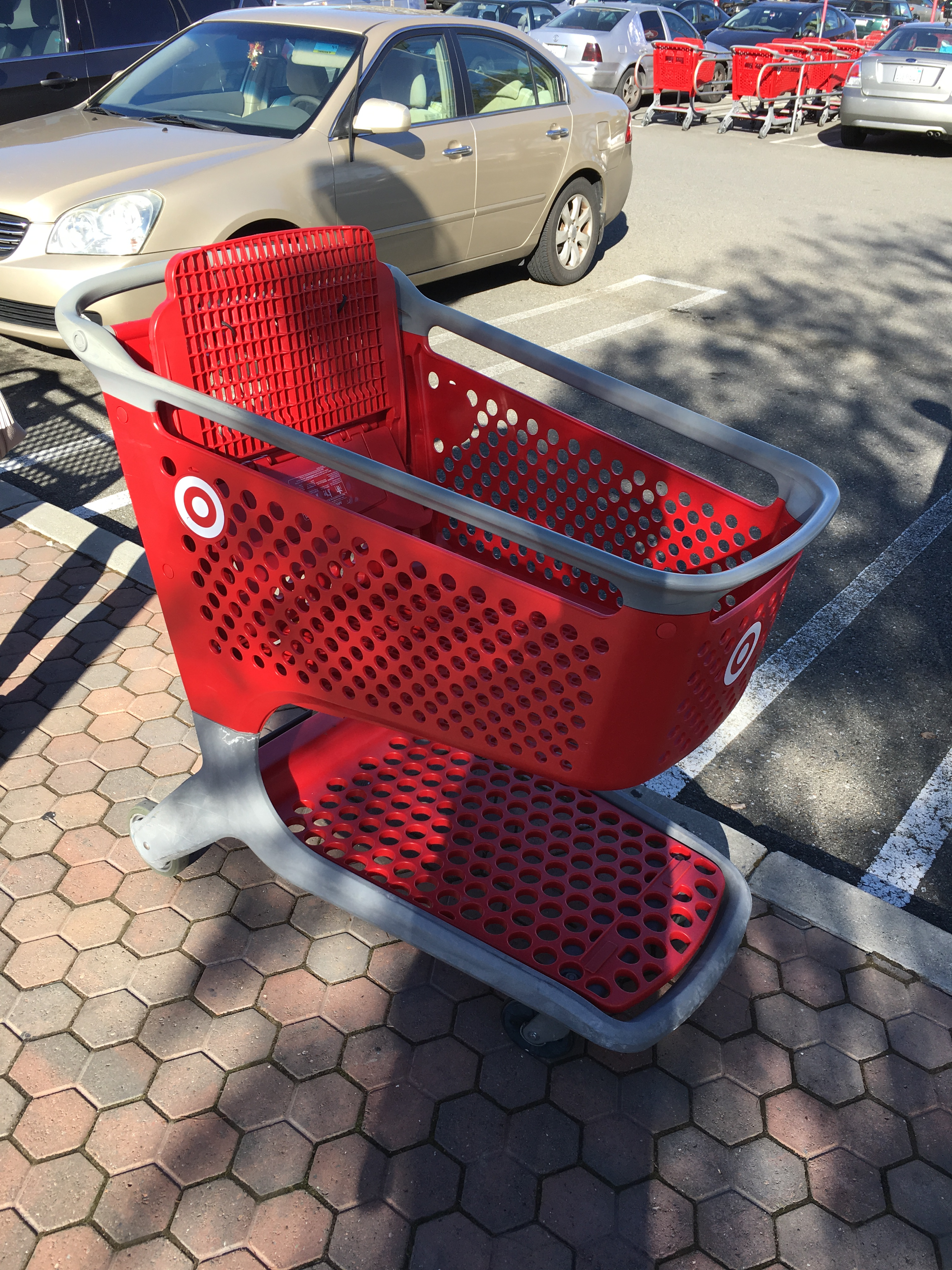
A shopping cart that has not been returned to its deposit (seen in the back)

The shopping cart theory originated in a study published by Science in 2008 and has since become an Internet meme. The theory judges a person's ethics by whether they return a shopping cart to its designated cart corral or deposit area. The concept became viral online after a 2020 Internet meme which posits that shopping carts present a litmus test for a person's capability of self-control and governance, as well as a way to judge one's moral character. Detractors of the theory have sought various reasons for why returning a cart is unfavorable, such as leaving children unattended as one of the more commonly referenced.

== Background ==
Shopping carts are a common fixture in retailing environments. The theory is primarily based upon the fact that a majority of retailers have historically offered no incentive for customers to return a shopping cart to a cart corral after use, and no disincentive for not returning the cart. The cart return system in place at these retailers is fully voluntary, with no external incentive for or against returning the cart and is therefore, as proponents of the theory argue, a test of moral character. Alternatively, some retailers (particularly European retailers) have implemented cart deposits which involve customers inserting a coin to receive a cart for use while shopping. The coin is only then returned upon the customer returning the cart to the deposit. Other retailers have a cart corral system, which involve customers voluntarily returning the cart to a designated corral or deposit area.

== Online discussion ==
The topic of customers returning their carts has been of discussion and debate online. In 2017, an article was published by anthropologist Krystal D'Costa in Scientific American, titled "Why Don't People Return Their Shopping Carts?" D'Costa listed the following reasons as why some choose to not return their carts: bad weather, the cart deposit being too far from one's parking spot, concerns about leaving children unattended, disability, the perception that it is a shop employee's job to return the carts, and the intent of leaving a cart for another to "easily pick up and use".

D'Costa's article has been retrospectively referenced by media outlets when discussing the "shopping cart theory" meme, which originates from a 4chan post made in May 2020. According to the post, the shopping cart is "the ultimate litmus test for whether a person is capable of self-governing". In addition to asserting that returning a cart to its designated deposit or rack is "objectively right" and widely considered appropriate, the post goes on to state that returning a cart is "the apex example of whether a person will do what is right without being forced to do it". Ultimately, the poster stated that the "shopping cart is what determines whether a person is a good or bad member of society."

Media writers have written that the 4chan post circulated online in 2020, becoming popular on Reddit and other websites, while also becoming a point of debate. The concept went viral on Twitter after a user named Jared tweeted about it, sparking discussion on the platform.

D'Costas later wrote that her Scientific American article had "struck a nerve"; on the magazine's Facebook page "some said they were afraid to leave children unattended, or struggled with a disability, or feared making someone's job obsolete". Lorraine Sommerfield of The Hamilton Spectator expressed conditional agreement with the theory, stating "stores should have lots of easily accessible cart corrals," and added that "some individuals may have mobility issues". Calling the original 4chan post "clinical", Nate Rogers of The Ringer cited its 2020 dating ("at the beginning of the pandemic") to suggest "it's surprisingly clear when shopping cart etiquette became a modern lightning-rod test of moral character," mentioning this time period as one in which "people were fiercely debating what they owed to their fellow citizens". The shopping cart theory has been referenced in a 2021 Politico article about a New Jersey legislation proposal that would fine shoppers for leaving carts in parking spots designated for disabled individuals. The YouTube channel "Cart Narcs", started by radio producer Sebastian Davis in 2020, is known for its videos where Davis confronts retail customers who leave their shopping carts in parking lots.

In 2024, the shopping cart theory experienced further virality online after TikTok user Leslie Dobson explained why she does not return carts, defending her refusal to do so. A clinical and forensic psychologist, Dobson stated her concern of leaving her child unattended in order to return the cart. This reason was concurrent with a common reason mentioned by the 2017 Scientific American article. Dobson also stated her video was intentionally provocative, in hopes of garnering attention and raising awareness of child abduction. Dobson's video received over 11 million views and received considerable backlash, though she also received messages from users who agreed with her stance, stating they were too afraid to discuss their opinion online themselves.

== See also ==
- Beer question – Thought experiment in American politics
- Tragedy of the commons – Overuse of a shared resource
