= Cart Narcs =

American YouTube channel

- Born: Sebastian Garrett Davis; 1980 or 1981 (age 44–45)
- Other name: Agent Sebastian
- Occupations: YouTuber, creative producer

YouTube information
- Channel: Cart Narcs
- Subscribers: 630 thousand
- Views: 95.0 million
- Last updated: December 12, 2025
- Website: cartnarcs.com

Cart Narcs is a YouTube channel run by Sebastian Garrett Davis from Burbank, California. Davis calls himself "Agent Sebastian" in the videos.

The channel is known for its videos where Davis confronts retail customers who leave their shopping carts in parking lots. He does this through what are purported to be humorous or lighthearted interactions, aiming to promote good etiquette and habits. During an appearance on an episode of Dr. Phil, Davis stated that his mission is to ensure public decency. In 2023, he stated that Cart Narcs were "little moral tales, but told with real people in a silly way".

A popular catchphrase on the channel is "lazybones," a name given to those who refuse to take their carts back. Occasionally, he might also call out those who litter.

Although he is based in California, he has conducted "investigations" in New Jersey, New York, Texas, Hawaii, Oregon, and Pennsylvania, as well as foreign countries like Australia and Japan.

Nate Rogers of The Ringer compared Cart Narcs's content to that of How To With John Wilson or Nathan for You, writing that they all show "a glimpse at some of the more bizarre and amusing people on the planet".

== Criticism ==
Davis has received criticism, with some referring to his actions as "harassment," and stating that he is not trying to protect public decency, but instead to purposely provoke, then publicly shame people for the purpose of entertainment at their expense.

Television producer Michael Schur criticized some aspects of Cart Narcs, stating:

"It’s a slightly unfair fight to use a person just going about their day—you don’t know what’s going on in their life, you don’t know what kind of people they are. And you’re kind of preying on the fact that they weren’t expecting to be ambushed by a film crew, and then capturing their adrenaline-fueled response to being filmed in that moment.

== Safety concerns ==
Sebastian Davis has discussed retaliation against his activities, including the pointing of guns, throwing drinks, and hurling the magnets Davis leaves back at him.

== See also ==
- Shopping cart theory
