= Candidate Physical Ability Test =

Physical assessment for aspiring firefighters

- Acronym: CPAT
- Type: Physical ability test
- Duration: 10 minutes and 20 seconds
- Score range: Pass/Fail

The IAFF / IAFC Candidate Physical Ability Test (CPAT) is the standard assessment for measuring an individual's ability to handle the physical demands of being a firefighter. The CPAT is a timed test that measures whether candidates are physically able to do eight separate tasks, designed to mirror essential job functions that firefighters would be expected to perform at fire scenes.

== Details ==
During the test, candidates are required to complete eight separate tasks (referred to as "events") in a total time period of 10 minutes and 20 seconds or less. The candidate walks 85 feet between each event, which gives some time to recover. The eight events must be completed in sequential order as follows:

- Stair Climb (climbing stairs while carrying an additional 25-pounds)
- Hose Drag (stretching uncharged hose lines, advancing lines)
- Equipment Carry (removing and carrying equipment from fire apparatus to fire ground)
- Ladder Raise and Extension (placing a ground ladder at the fire scene and extending the ladder to the roof or a window)
- Forcible Entry (penetrating a locked door, breaching a wall)
- Search (crawling through dark unpredictable areas to search for victims)
- Rescue (removing a victim or partner from a burning building)
- Ceiling Breach and Pull (locating a fire and pulling down a ceiling to check for fire extension).

During the test, candidates are required to wear long pants, a hard hat with chin strap, work gloves, and a 50-pound weighted vest. This is designed to simulate the weight of a firefighter's personal protective equipment. For the Stair Climb event, candidates are required to carry an additional 25 pounds of weight (one 12.5 pound weight on each shoulder), which simulates the carrying of a hose pack into a high-rise fire.

Candidates are accompanied by a test proctor, who calls out directions and scores the candidate's successful completion of each event, while monitoring the time elapsed. Each event of the CPAT must be completed as directed. If a candidate fails any component of the test or does not complete the test within the 10 minute and 20 second time limit, they will fail the entire test.

The test is scored as Pass or Fail.

== See also ==
- United States Army Physical Fitness Test
