= Wanzl (company) =

German manufacturer of shopping trolleys

Wanzl GmbH & Co. KGaA
- Company type: GmbH & Co. KGaA
- Founded: 1918/1947
- Headquarters: Leipheim
- Key people: Peter Ruhwedel, Chairman of the Supervisory Board; Peter Allaart, CEO; Bernhard Renzhofer, CSO; Alexander Kienle, CFO; Andreas Starzmann, CTO
- Revenue: 720 million Euro (2018)
- Number of employees: 5,000 (2018)
- Divisions: metal industry
- Website: www.wanzl.com

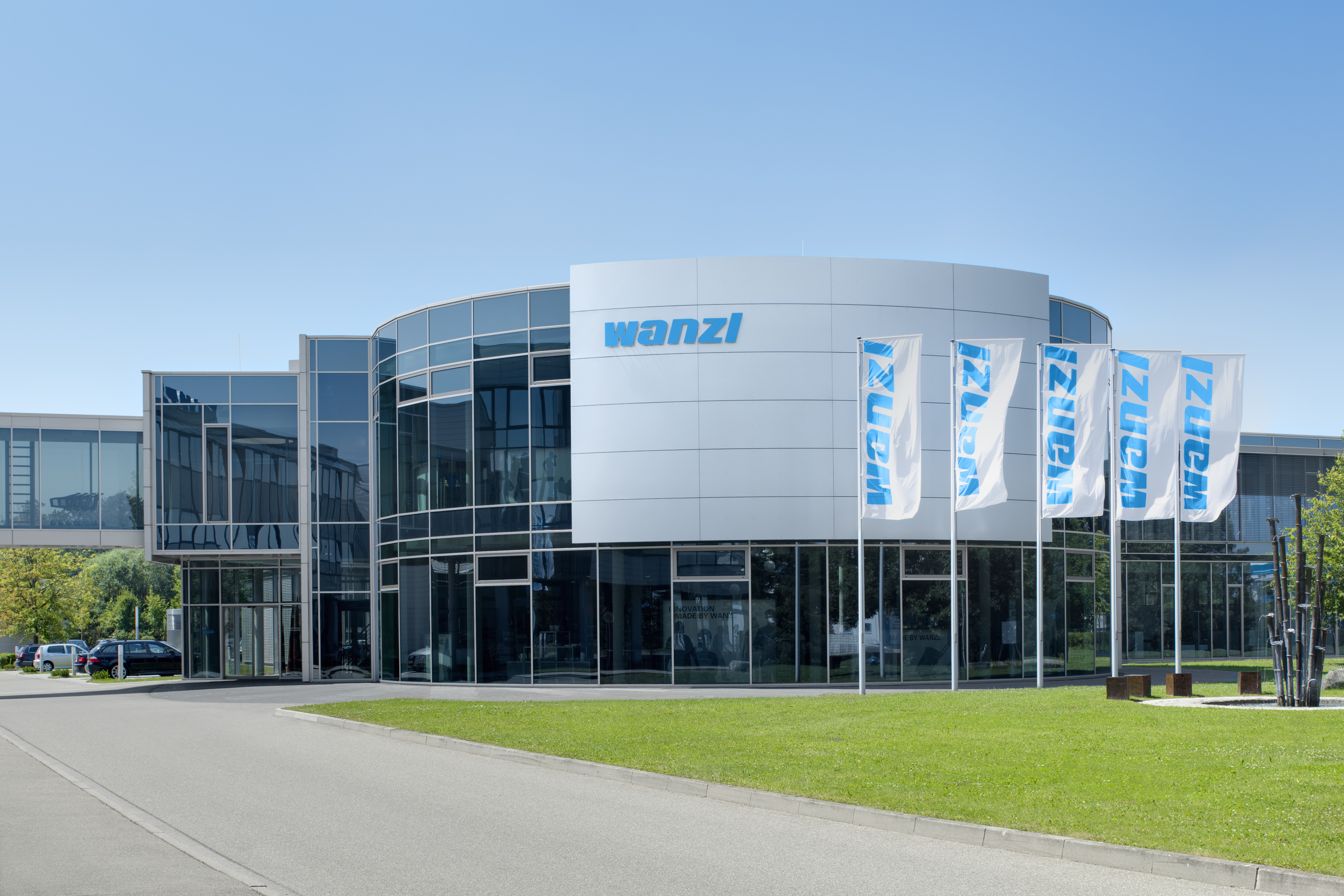
Wanzl headquarters in Leipheim

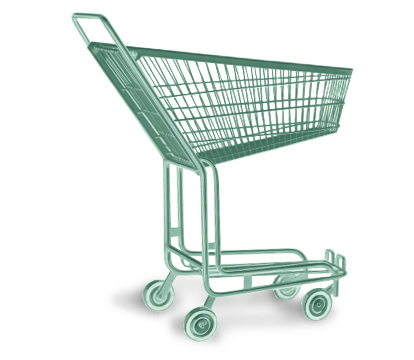
"Concentra" model shopping trolley, 1957

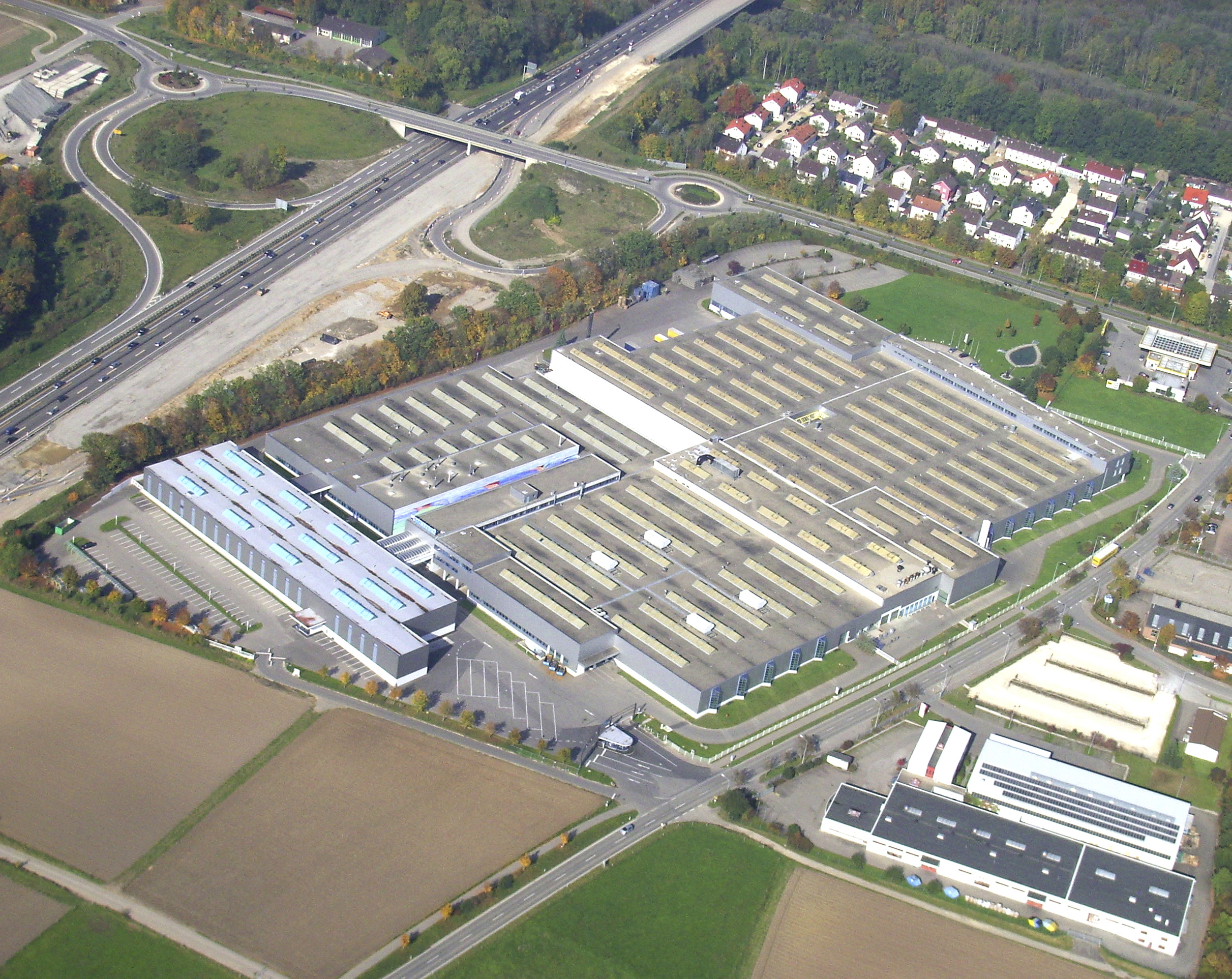
Plant IV in Leipheim

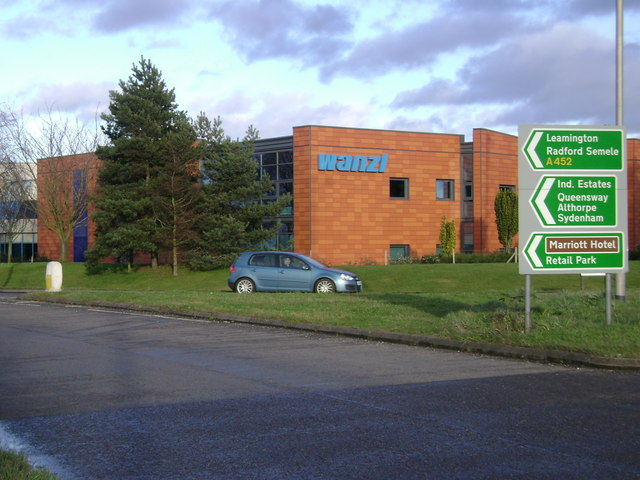
Wanzl subsidiary in Warwick, UK

Wanzl GmbH & Co. KGaA is the world's largest manufacturer of shopping trolleys and luggage trolleys.

The company, which has its headquarters in Leipheim, Germany, has approximately 5,000 employees in 12 plants in 8 countries and over 27 sales offices (2018 figures). Annual production totalled approximately 2.0 million shopping trolleys.

== History ==
In 1918, Rudolf Wanzl Senior founded a locksmith's in Giebau in the Sudetenland (today part of the Czech Republic), which he built up into a scale manufacturing business and agricultural machinery company with 20 employees. After the expulsion of Germans from the region in 1947, Rudolf Wanzl Junior re-established the company in Leipheim as a scale manufacturer and repair workshop. The inspiration to focus on the concept of self-service came from the cash register manufacturer NCR in Augsburg. The company ordered hand-made shopping baskets for its demonstration room. At around the same time, the "Production" consumer co-operative, based in Hamburg, ordered 40 trolleys and 100 hand baskets for the opening of Germany's first self-service shop. At the start of the 1950s, Rudolf Wanzl travelled to the United States where he met Sylvan Goldman, inventor of the shopping trolley. On the return flight he had already designed his own more manoeuvrable version, which became the model for all shopping trolleys in use today. In 1951, the first shopping trolley with a fixed basket was patented. Three years later, the co-owning Siegel brothers left the company to found their own business. This is how it came about that Germany's two largest shopping trolley manufacturers were both based in Leipheim for many years. By 1956, Wanzl had 74 employees.

=== The 1960s ===
A new plant was opened in Kirchheim to increase production capacity. Wanzl incorporates manual turnstiles into its product range, to meet the need of Germany's increasingly large supermarkets for customer direction and reduction of theft. By 1966, the company already had 400 employees.

=== The 1970s ===
Following the expansion of German chains into neighbouring countries, the first international branches of the company are founded. Luggage trolleys are supplied to the German Federal Railway stations for the first time. In the course of renewed expansion of production, another plant is built close to Leipheim railway station. For a time, this plant had its own railway connection. In 1978, the company was honoured with the "Goldener Zuckerhut" award for outstanding achievement in the grocery industry.

=== The 1980s ===
The family-run company supplies luggage trolleys to Frankfurt Airport, the first time it has supplied these to an airport. A special feature of these trolleys is that they can be taken on an escalator. In order to be able to better serve the company's market in France, a new plant is built in Sélestat in Alsace. The increasing popularity of DIY stores leads to further increases in production. The company opens sales branches in the U.K. and Belgium. By 1989, Wanzl had 1,600 employees.

=== The 1990s ===
In 1990, plant IV is opened in Leipheim, close to the A8 motorway. Today, this plant is home to the company's headquarters. In 1991, Wanzl founds the Shop Solutions business division. From now on, the fittings for entire supermarkets may be planned and shelving systems manufactured. With the fall of the Iron Curtain, the concept of self-service shopping also spreads to Eastern Europe, opening up new markets. In 1995, a production plant is opened in the Czech Republic, not far from Rudolf Wanzl's former home town. In 1998, after ten years as Managing Director, Gottfried Wanzl assumes overall management of the business from his father. Major orders such as equipping the new airport in Hong Kong with luggage trolleys drive employee numbers and sales figures even higher. In 1999, one million shopping trolleys are manufactured in a year for the first time.

=== The 2000s ===
The markets in the conventional commercial business become increasingly saturated in Western Europe, whilst in developing countries, the self-service concept continues to increase. In 2005 in Shanghai a new Wanzl plant is opened incorporating both production and management. The rise in online trade leads Wanzl to expand its product range to include order picking trolleys and warehouse trolleys. Hotels are also supplied with a specialist product range for the first time. Following the insolvency of former competitor Siegel, Wanzl takes on a large proportion of the company's workforce. In the same year, Wanzl receives the Bavarian Quality Award. In order to develop the Shop Solutions business division, the company integrates Unseld, a carpentry firm based in Ulm.

=== The 2010s ===
In January 2012, Wanzl increased its existing stake in the North American consortium Technibilt, acquired in 2006, to 100%. On 11 February 2012, a fire broke out in the electroplating building. The 40 x 40 m large unit was completely burnt out; damage ran into the tens of millions. Just two years after this major fire, the rebuilt electroplating plant was launched into operation on the same site.

== Business Divisions ==
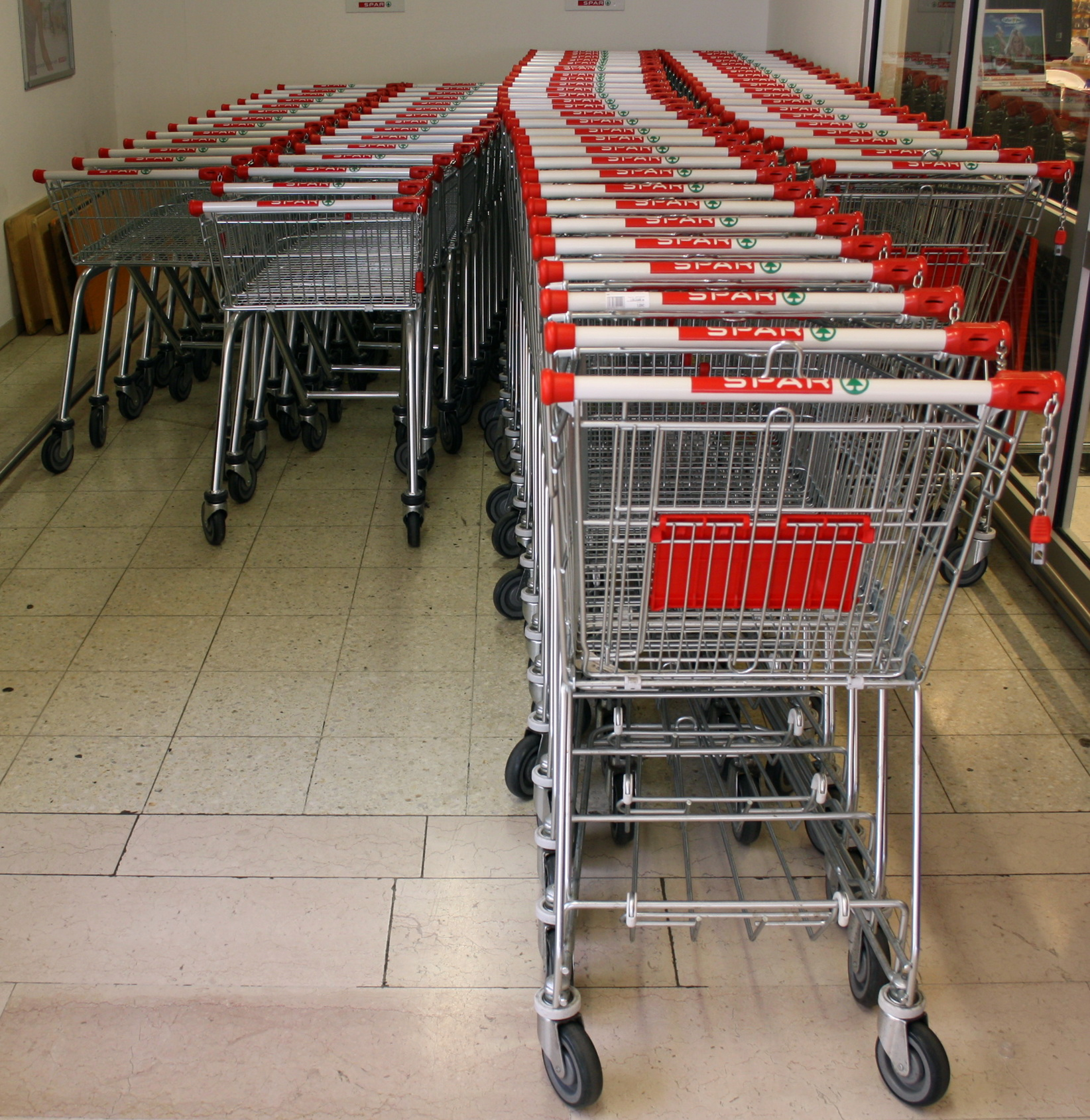
Wanzl-manufactured shopping trolleys. Left: from the EL product range (here with smaller basket size); right: from the DRC range with base tray for cases of drinks etc.

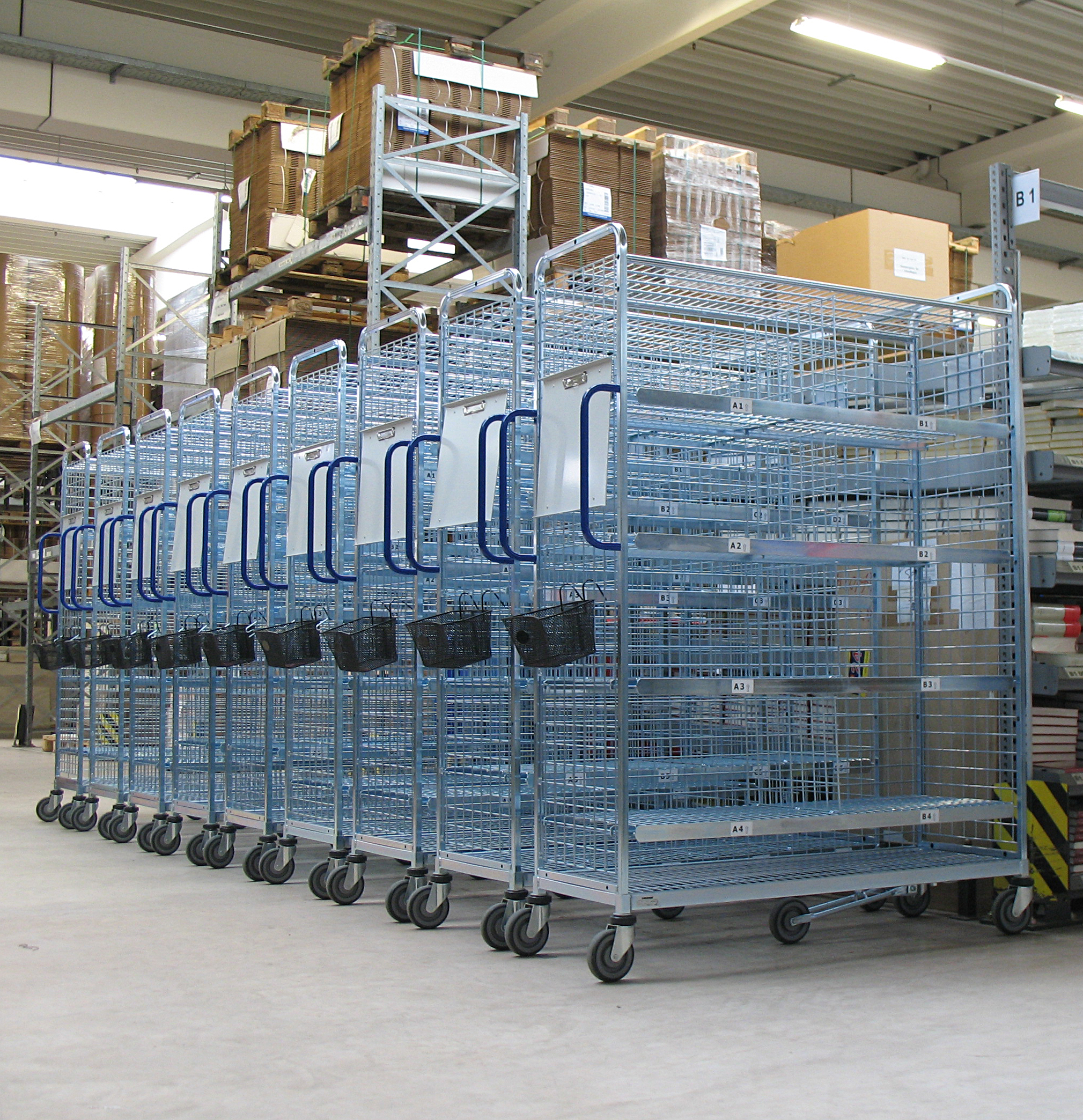
Order picking trolley KT3

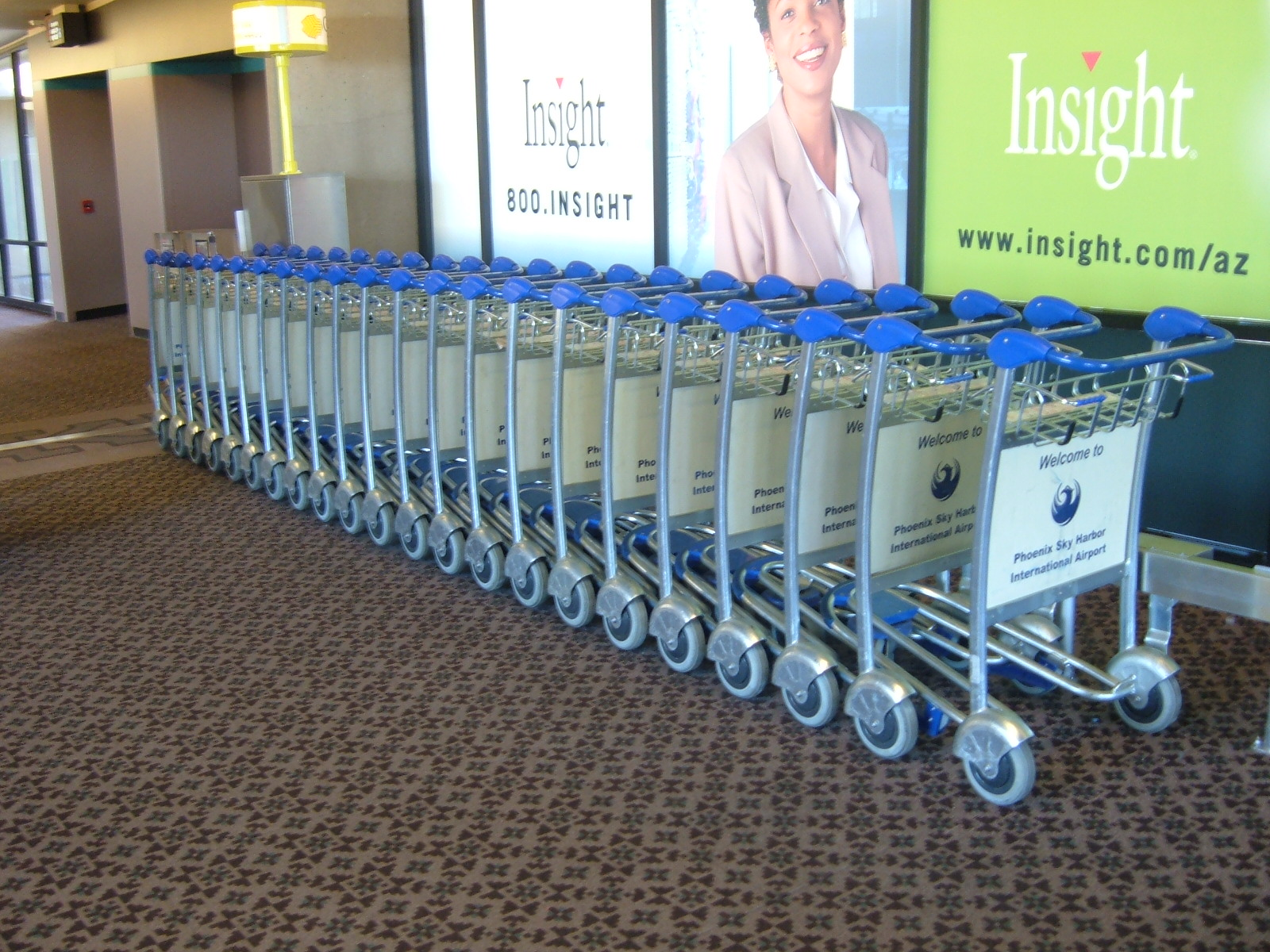
Wanzl luggage trolleys at Phoenix airport

=== Retail ===
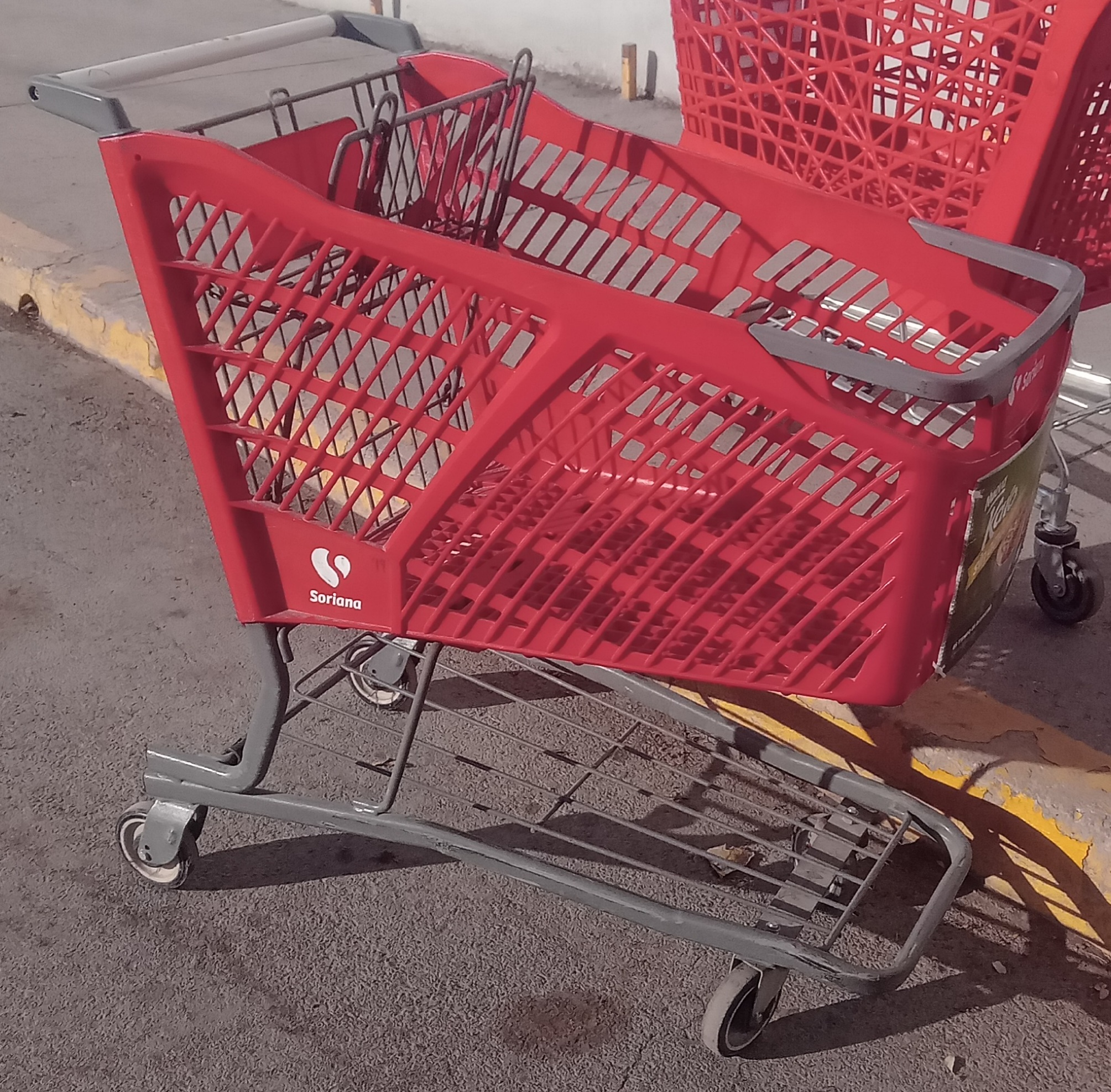
Technibilt Renaissance trolley in Mexico.

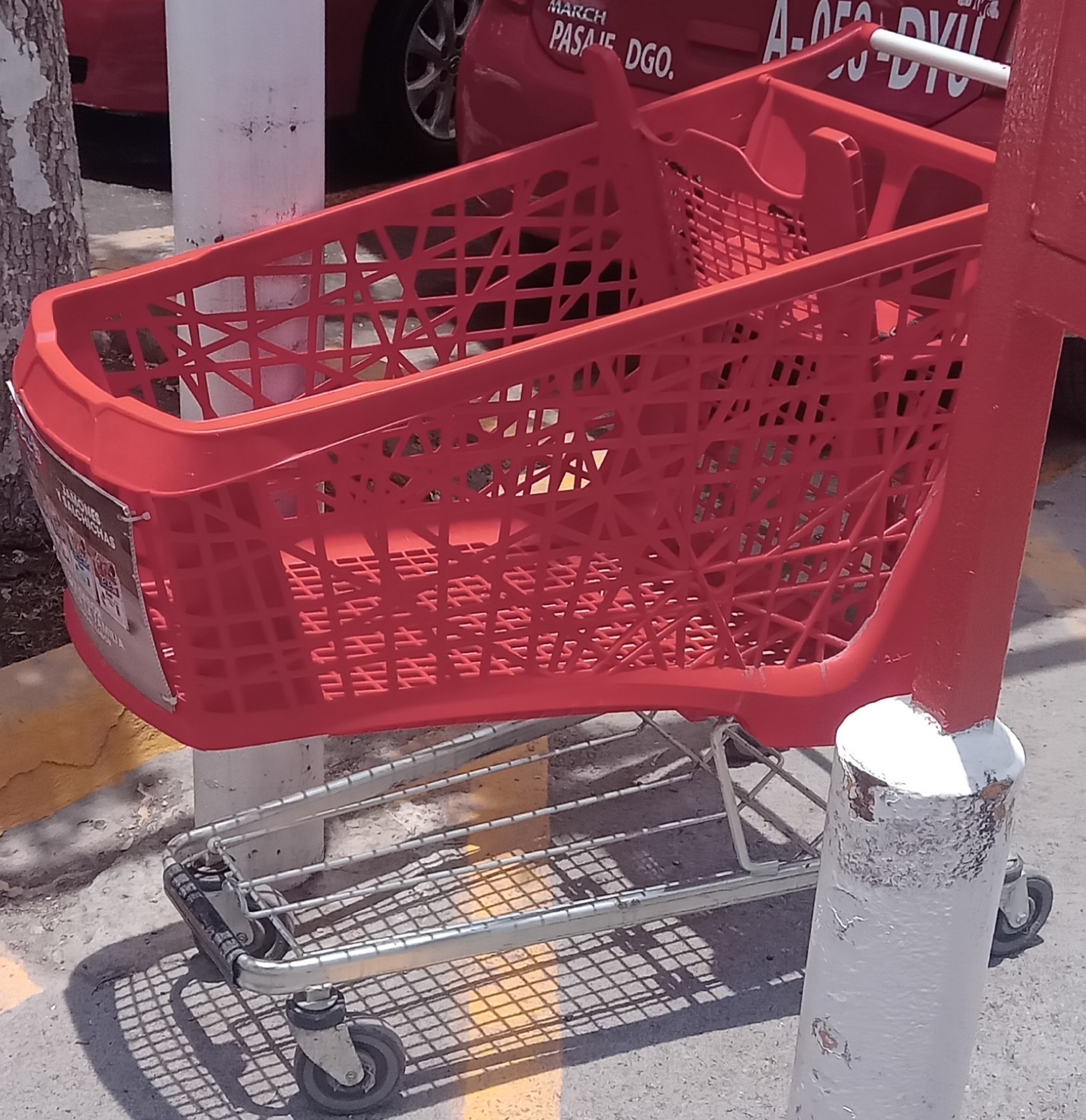
Wanzl Salsa shopping cart in Mexico.

In addition to metal shopping trolleys, the company has now been making plastic shopping trolleys for several years. These go by the product name of Tango and are exported to other European countries in particular. The range of products also includes shop fittings such as shelving and display units and turnstiles and even complete store installation solutions.

=== Material Handling ===
In 2002, the product ranges for industry and logistics customers were brought together in this business division. In addition to trolleys for picking orders, the company also manufactures transport containers and pallet boxes.

=== Airport ===
Wanzl luggage trolleys, entry controls and space partitions are in use in railway stations and airports around the world. Customers include the major air transport hubs of Frankfurt, Hong Kong and Paris. Wanzl luggage trolleys are also in use at the Eurostar terminal at London St. Pancras.

=== Access ===
Turnstiles, rotary locks, customer guides and barriers have been part of the product range for over 50 years. Today's focus is on access gates and interactive terminals.

=== Hotel ===
This business division was established in 2006. It offers hotel equipment such as laundry, cleaning and serving trolleys. The trolleys are also used on some AIDA Cruise Line ships.

== Production sites ==
Wanzl has three production sites in Leipheim, one in Kirchheim in Schwaben and one each in France (Sélestat), Czech Republic (Hněvotín) and China (Shanghai).

== International branches ==
From 1970 onwards, numerous service and sales branches have been established across the world.

- Vienna, Austria (moved to Vösendorf in 2014)
- Thal, Switzerland
- Oosterhout, The Netherlands
- Leuven, Belgium
- Warwick, U.K.
- Newton, USA
- Melbourne, Australia
- Dubai, United Arab Emirates
- Pune, India
- Moscow, Russia
- Kyiv, Ukraine
- Hadsten, Dänemark
- Budapest, Hungary
- Sereď, Slovakia
- Barcelona, Spain
- Nadarzyn, Poland
- Montichiari, Italy (moved to Travagliato in 2005)

== Company Management ==
Gottfried Wanzl, a son of Rudolf Wanzl junior, was Managing Director of the Group for many years. In 2014, Klaus Meier-Kortwig took over as Chairman of the Management Board. Managing Director for Finance is Alexander Kienle. Bernhard Renzhofer is Managing Director of Sales. Harald P. Dörenbach was initially Managing Director of the Technology division. At the end of 2021, former Thyssenkrupp manager Peter Allaart replaced Dörenbach. Peter Allaart has been Chairman of the Management Board since December 2024. Peter Ruhwedel is Chairman of the Supervisory Board.

== Logos ==
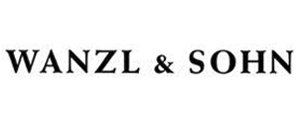
The 1950s

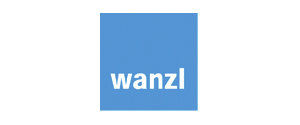
The 1960s

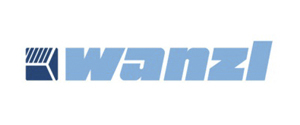
from 1970

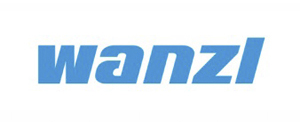
from 2005

== Trade fairs ==
Wanzl is a regular exhibitor at the triennial EuroShop trade fair, which takes place in Düsseldorf.
