= Wanzl =

Wanzl may refer to:

- Wanzl (company), an industrial company based in Germany
- Wanzl rifle, a trapdoor conversion lorenz rifle saw limited use in World War I
- Rudolf Wanzl, German businessman
