= Caroline's Cart =

Type of shopping cart

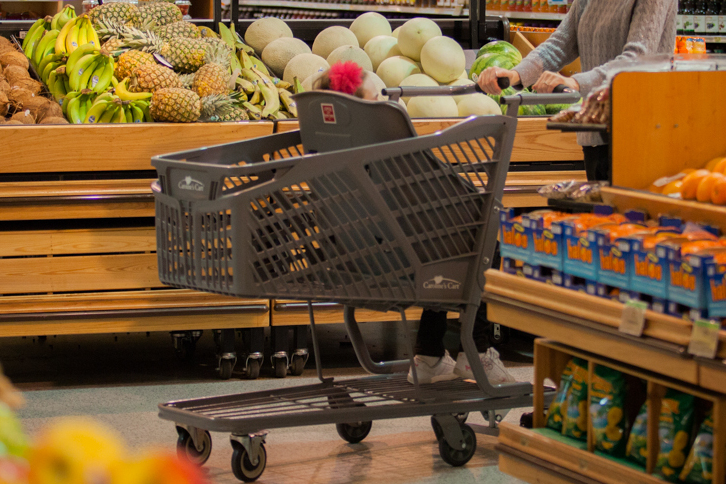
Side profile of a Caroline's Cart with occupant

A Caroline's Cart is a specific type of shopping cart which allows for the assisted locomotion of non-ambulatory adults or larger children.

== Description ==
The Caroline's Cart was invented by Drew Ann Long, a mother of a special needs daughter from Alabama. They are named after Long's daughter, Caroline, and were first made available at American retail stores in 2011. They are manufactured by Technibilt.

Caroline's Carts are designed to enable caretakers to push a larger disabled person while allowing room for loading the cart with groceries. Features include a forward facing seat with a five-point harness and extended handles to provide room for the person being pushed. They have the capacity to hold a 250-pound occupant. The carts have six wheels with brakes for stability and ease of loading.

The carts are utilized in stores such as Kroger, Publix, Save Mart, Target, and Walmart.
