= Shopping basket =

Transport container for purchased goods

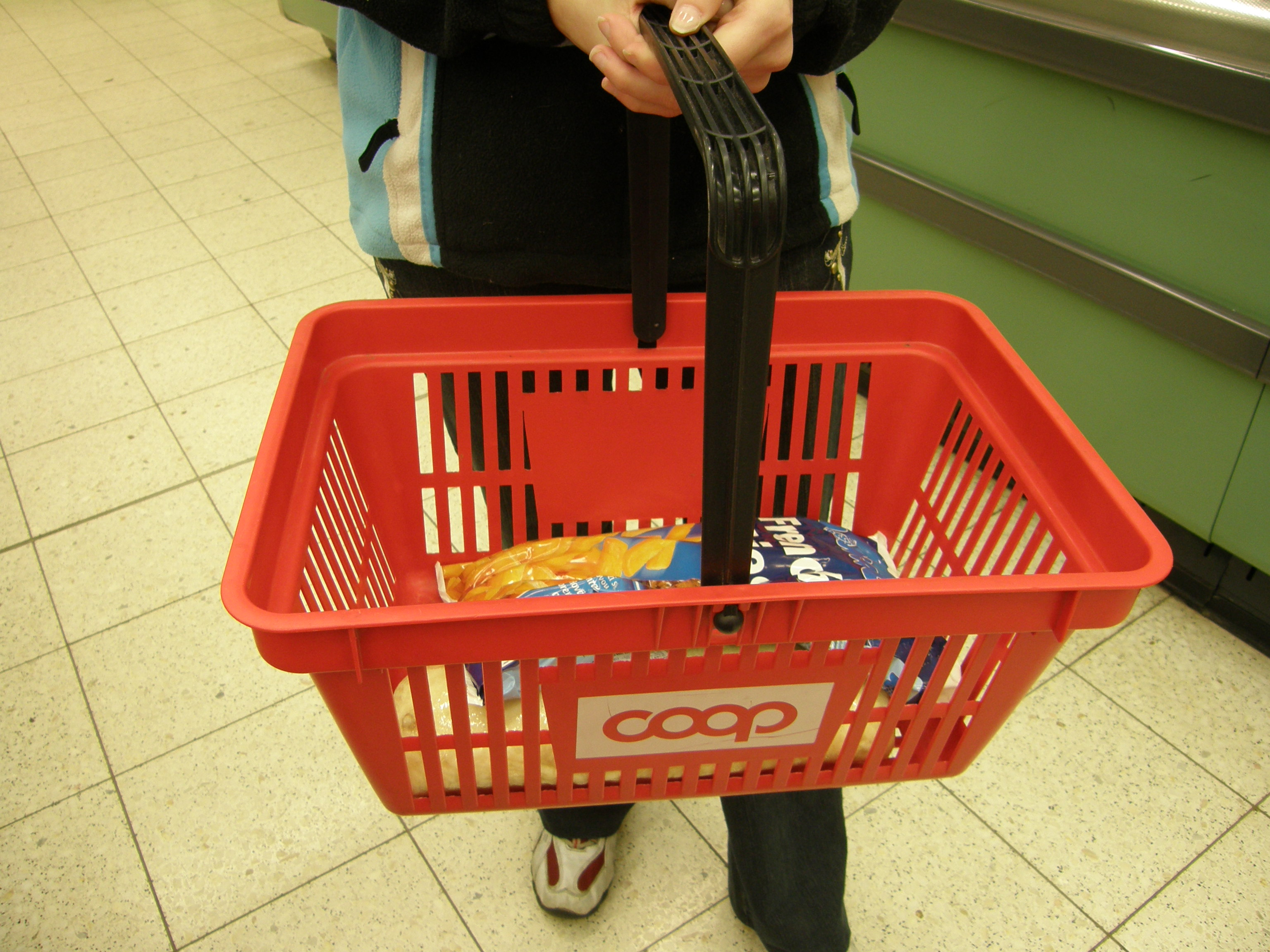
A shopping basket with items inside

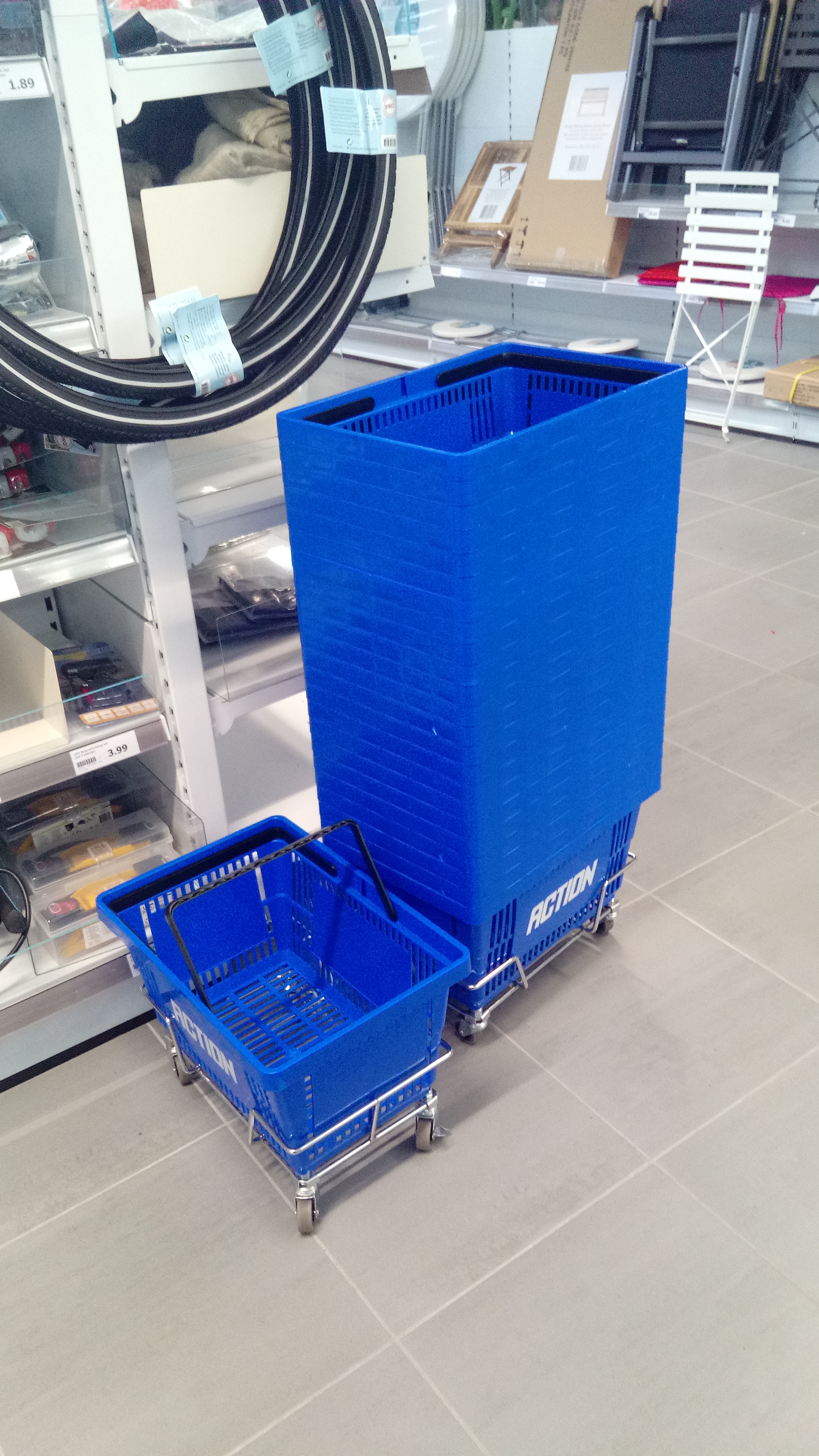
Two stacks of shopping baskets on movable carts

A shopping basket is a basket provided by stores for shoppers to carry around items before purchase. They are the smaller equivalent of shopping carts. Some sources also use the term shopping basket as a synonym for shopping bag, referring to bags owned by customers used to carry purchased items home.

Modern shopping baskets are usually made of plastic with a handle that folds downwards so that the baskets can be stacked. Shopping baskets are usually provided at store entrances together with shopping carts, with customers returning the baskets at check-out. Many stores have small carts that stacks of baskets can be placed onto, so that many baskets can be quickly moved from the check-out to the store entrance.

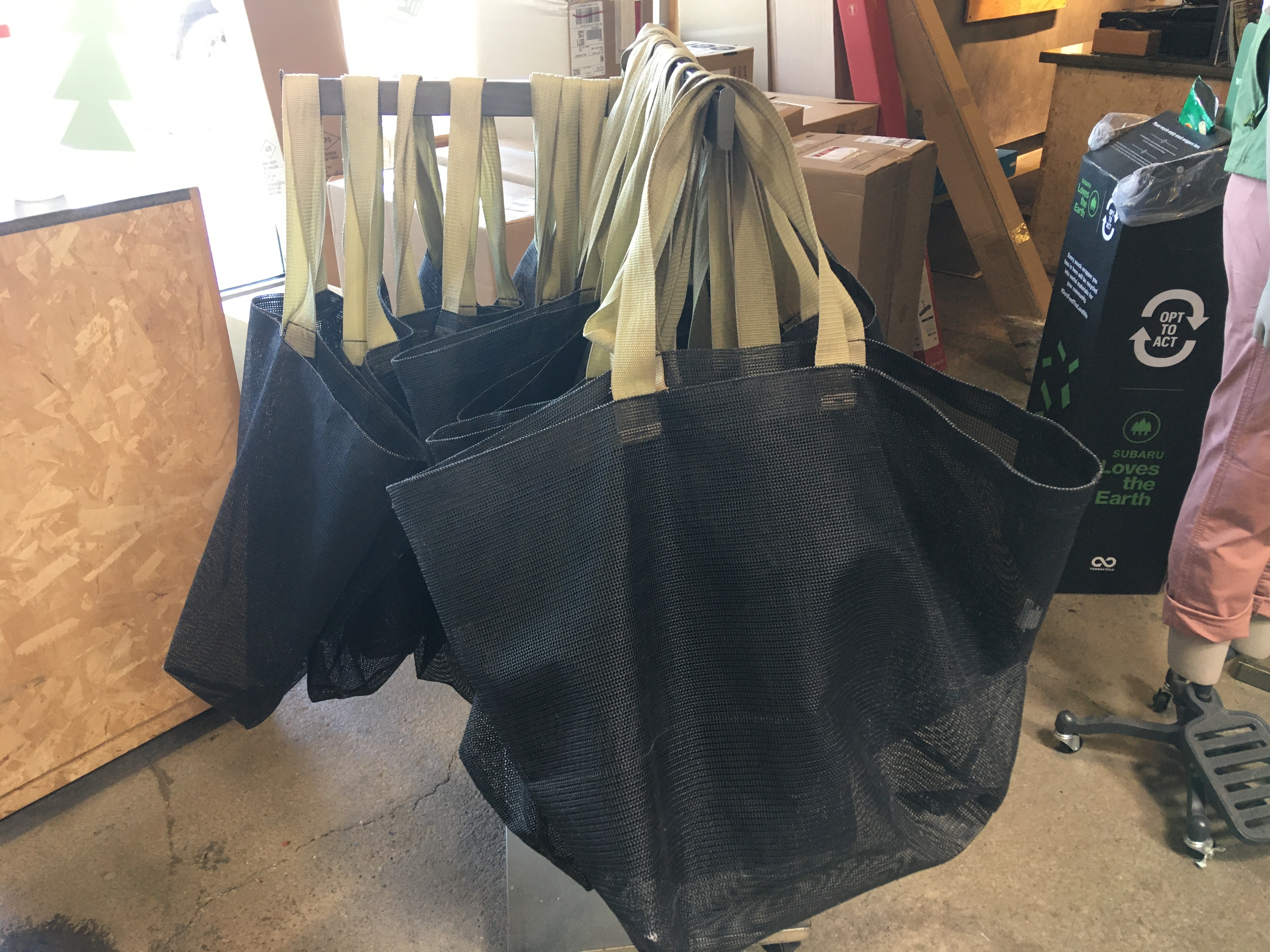
A rack of soft bags functioning as shopping baskets

Some stores, primarily clothing stores or other stores selling soft items, may instead use cloth bags in lieu of shopping baskets. Such cloth bags function the same as shopping baskets but are usually not called baskets.

== See also ==
- Shopping trolley
- Shopping trolley (caddy)
