= Orla Watson =

American engineer and Inventor of shopping cart

- Born: June 3, 1896
- Died: January 17, 1983 (aged 86)
- Education: Nevada Business College
- Occupations: Inventor and businessman
- Known for: Inventor of the modern shopping cart
- Spouse: Edith Watson

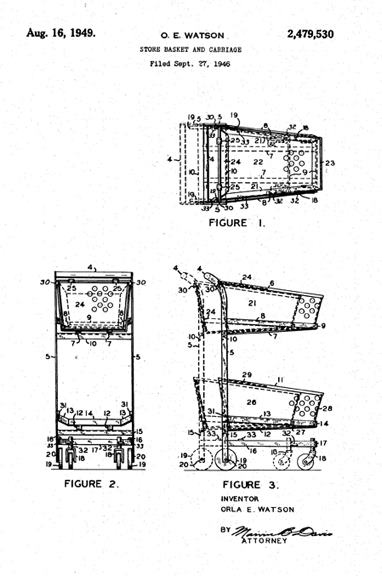
Original patent documents showing design of the nesting feature of the Telescope Cart. The rear of the cart swings forward when a cart is shoved into it, hence the nesting feature.

Orla E. Watson (June 3, 1896 – January 17, 1983) was an American inventor, engineer, and draftsman. He is most remembered for his invention of the rear swinging door feature on grocery shopping carts allowing to "nest" onto each other in order to save space.

== History ==
Orla E. Watson was born in 1896. He dropped out of Nevada Business College after one year, and had a gig in working as a stock clerk in a Kansas City hardware store before joining the U.S. Army, where he served until 1918. He then worked in various jobs including machinist, draftsman, and foreman. Meanwhile, Watson experimented with various successful inventions on the side, including a Model T timer to replace the automobile's stock electrical device. In 1933, he opened a business making air conditioners. Watson was granted four patents before the shopping cart in 1944, for mechanical valves, pumps, and gauges that he did not ultimately license or manufacture.

In 1946, 50-year-old Watson left his job as draftsman at the Crafting and Processing Engineering Company in Kansas City to open Western Machine Co., a machine shop and contract manufacturing business. Watson made a prototype of a new shopping cart with a hinge and a swinging gate that allowed it to interlock laterally with other carts for compact storage.

== Shopping cart activities ==
Watson presented the cart to ten local grocery store owners, including Fred E. Taylor, who joined Watson and George O'Donnell, a salesman from Oak Park, Illinois, in founding Telescope Carts Inc. in 1947. The shopping carts were first used that year at Floyd Day's Super Market.

Telescope Carts, Inc. struggled with poor quality carts from its authorized suppliers, and other unlicensed manufacturers made and sold imitations of the cart during Watson's pending patent. Watson also developed the power lift shopping cart in 1947, which could raise the lower basket at the checkout counter for easier retrieval of groceries. He produced and sold few, and later discontinued the effort, abandoning the patent application.

=== Patent dispute ===
Watson applied for a patent on his shopping cart invention in 1946, but Sylvan Goldman filed a similar patent and contested. In 1949, Goldman gave up his rights to the patent. Watson was granted a patent #2,479,530 on August 16, 1949 for the "Telescope Cart" which could be "nested" together in order to save space without disassembly after each use. In exchange, Goldman received licensing rights to produce and sell carts with Watson receiving royalties for each cart produced.

In 1950 a legal battle broke out between Telescoping Carts and United Steel, which was to last for three years. Watson’s archives contain very little on the early stages of this dispute. Telescope Carts sued United Steel for patent infringement and the latter company defended itself on the grounds that the patent was invalid. In 1951 Goldman challenged the amount of royalties that he had to pay Telescope Carts, on the grounds that many manufacturers were infringing the patent.

The royalties Watson received for each cart manufactured led to his 1954 claim against the Internal Revenue Service, for refund of taxes paid on the profits of his invention, as a Congressional bill changed the status of invention-derived income from ordinary income to capital gains, thereby lowering the taxes owed.

== Death ==
Orla E. Watson died January 17, 1983.
