= Shopping cart =

Cart that is used at stores to hold items

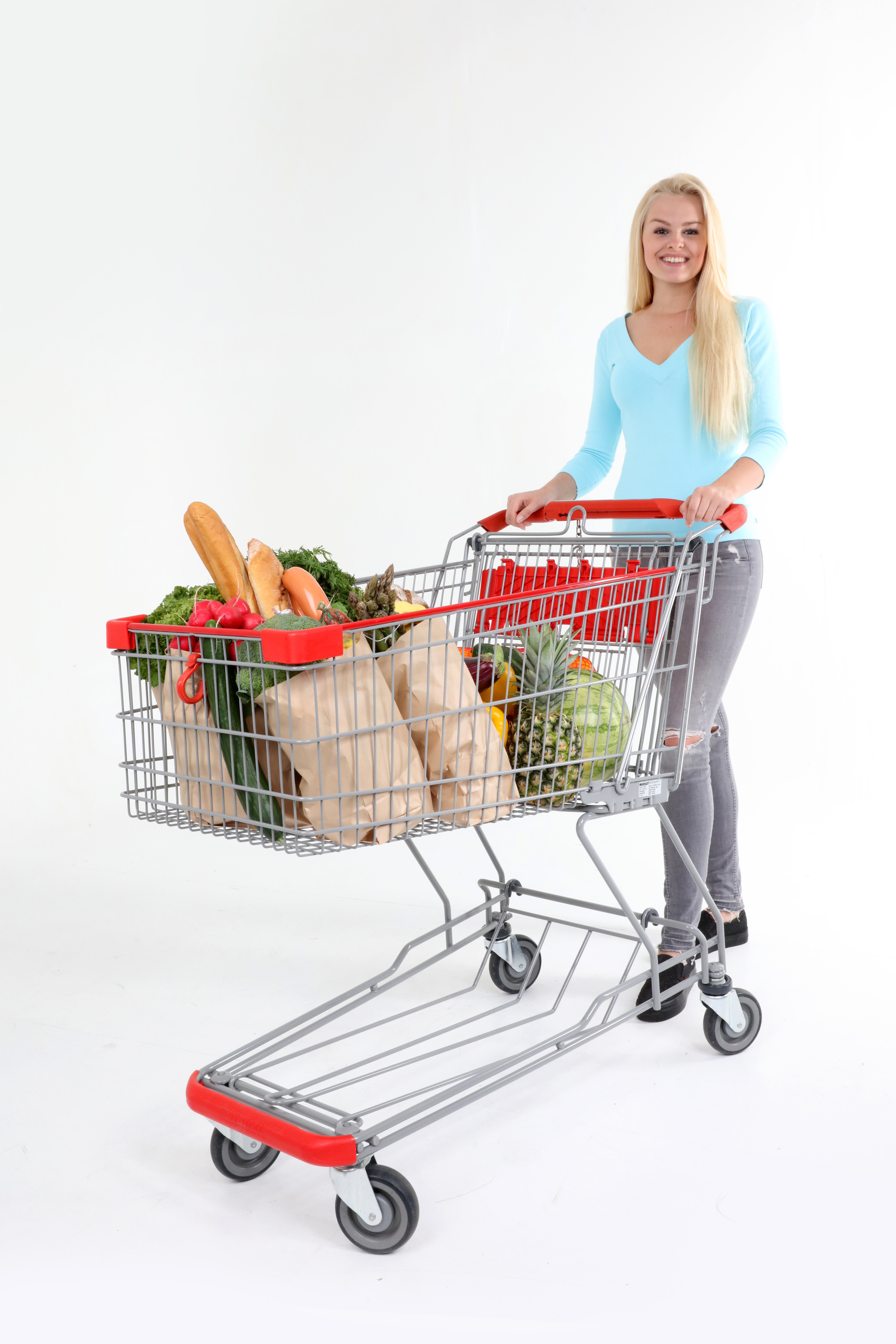
A shopping cart held by a woman, containing bags and food

A shopping cart (North American English), trolley (British English, Australian English), also known by a variety of other names, is a wheeled cart supplied by a shop or store, especially supermarkets, for use by customers inside the premises for transport of merchandise as they move around the premises, while shopping, prior to heading to the checkout counter, cashiers or tills.

== Design ==
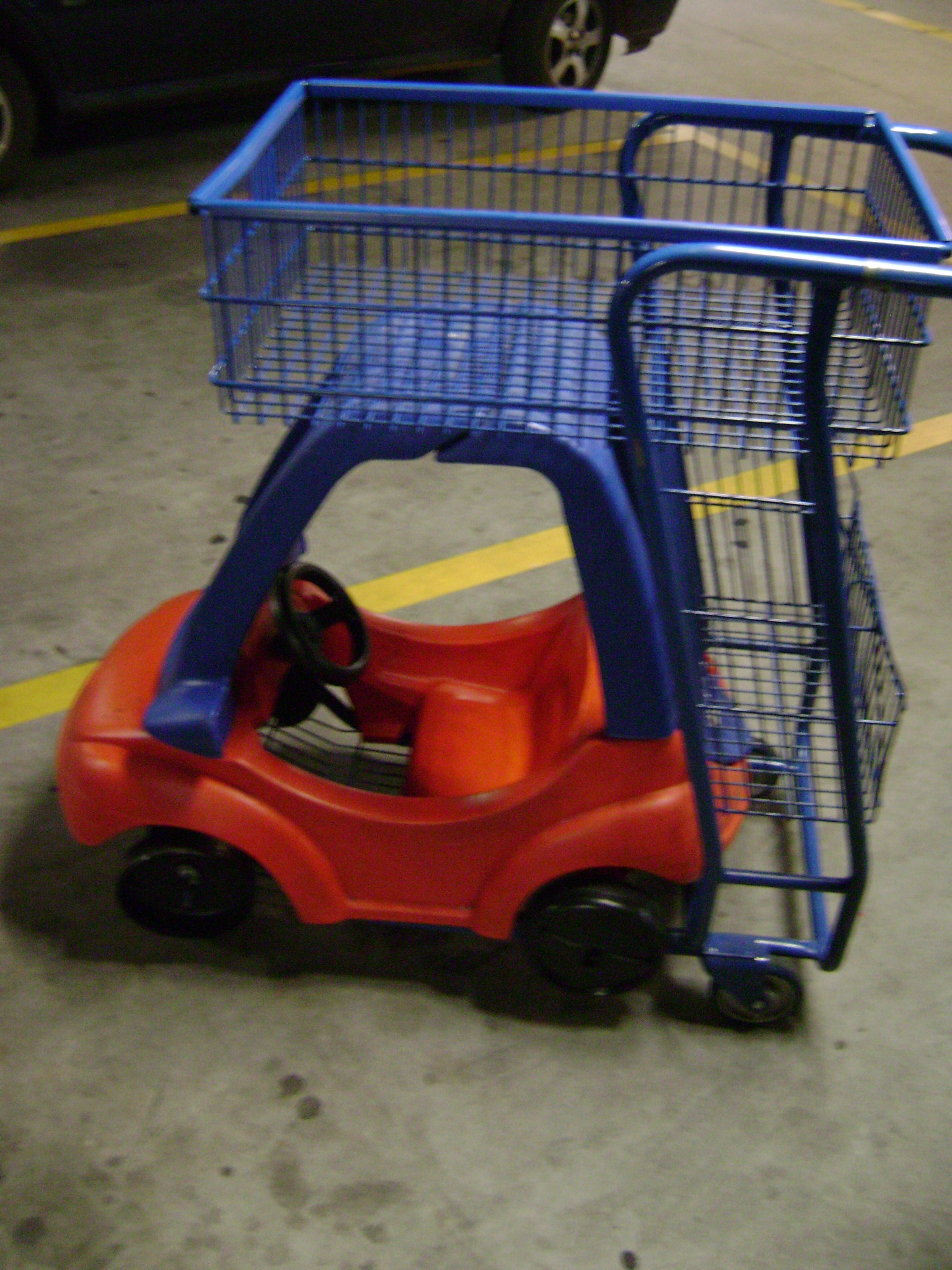
A child-friendly shopping cart design

Most modern shopping carts are made of metal or a combination of metal and plastic and have been designed to nest within each other in a line to facilitate collecting and moving many at one time and also to save on storage space. The carts can come in many sizes, with larger ones able to carry a child. There are also specialized carts designed for two children, and electric mobility scooters with baskets designed for individuals with disabilities.

As of 2006, approximately 24,000 children are injured in the United States each year in shopping carts. Some stores both in the U.S. and elsewhere have child carrying carts that look like a car or van with a seat where a child can sit equipped with a steering wheel and sometimes a horn. Such "Car-Carts" may offer protection and convenience by keeping the child restrained, closer to the ground, protected from falling items, and amused.

Shopping carts are usually fitted with four wheels; however if any one wheel jams the cart can become difficult to handle. Most carts in the United States have swivel wheels at the front, while the rear wheels are fixed in orientation, while in Europe it is more common to have four swivel wheels. This difference in design correlates with smaller retail premises in Europe. The front part of the cart is often sectioned off in order to place household goods such as bleach, cleaning products etc. so that they do not mix with food.

An alternative to the shopping cart is a small hand-held shopping basket. A customer may prefer a basket for a small amount of merchandise. Small shops, where carts would be impractical, often supply only baskets, or may offer a small cart which uses an inserted shopping basket within the frame of the cart to give customers a choice.

== History ==
In the 1910s, Joseph Weingarten, co-founder of the supermarket chain Weingarten's, provided wheeled carriers for shopping baskets.

=== Development of first shopping cart by Sylvan Goldman ===
One of the first shopping carts was introduced on June 4, 1937, the invention of Sylvan Goldman, owner of the Humpty Dumpty supermarket chain in Oklahoma. One night, in 1936, Goldman sat in his office wondering how customers might move more groceries. He found a wooden folding chair and put a basket on the seat and wheels on the legs. Goldman and one of his employees, a mechanic named Fred Young, began tinkering. Their first shopping cart was a metal frame that held two wire baskets. Since they were inspired by the folding chair, Goldman called his carts "folding basket carriers". Another mechanic, Arthur Kosted, developed a method to mass-produce the carts by inventing an assembly line capable of forming and welding the wire. The cart was awarded patent number 2,196,914 on April 9, 1940 (Filing date: March 14, 1938), titled, "Folding Basket Carriage for Self-Service Stores". They advertised the invention as part of a new "No Basket Carrying Plan". Goldman had already pioneered self-serve stores and carts were part of the self-serve retail concept.

The invention did not catch on immediately. Men found them effeminate; women found them suggestive of a baby carriage. "I've pushed my last baby," an offended woman informed Goldman. After Goldman hired several male and female models to push his new invention around his store and demonstrate their utility, as well as greeters to explain their use, shopping carts became extremely popular and Goldman became a multimillionaire. In urban areas like New York City, where transporting groceries home from the store's parking lot is more likely to involve walking and/or a trip by public transportation than a car ride, privately owned carts resembling Goldman's design are still popular. Instead of baskets, these carts are built to hold the paper bags dispensed by the grocery store.

Another shopping cart innovator was Orla Watson, who invented the swinging rear door to allow for "nesting" in 1946. Orla Watson continued to make modifications to his original design. Advice from his trusted business partners Fred Taylor, a grocery store owner in Kansas City, and George O'Donnell, a grocery store refrigeration salesman, and the incorporation of Watson's swinging door yielded the familiar nesting cart that we see today using the "double-decker" approach. Goldman patented a similar version of the cart with only one basket rather than the double-decker feature, which he called the "Nest-Kart" in 1948, over one year after Watson filed for his patent. The Nest-Kart incorporated the same nesting mechanism present on the shopping carts designed by Watson, and an interference investigation was ordered by Telescope Carts, Inc. alleging infringement of the patent in 1948. After a protracted legal battle, Goldman ultimately recognized Watson's invention and paid one dollar in damages for counterfeit, in exchange for which Watson granted Goldman an exclusive operating license (apart from the three licenses that had already been granted).

Years prior in 1909, Bessie DeCamp invented a seat belt for chairs, go-karts or carriages. This was well before shopping carts with child seating areas were invented. Goldman introduced a child seating area on shopping carts in 1947. In 1967, David Allen would implement the first seat belts for shopping carts using retractable seat belts.

=== Development of nesting carts by Orla Watson ===
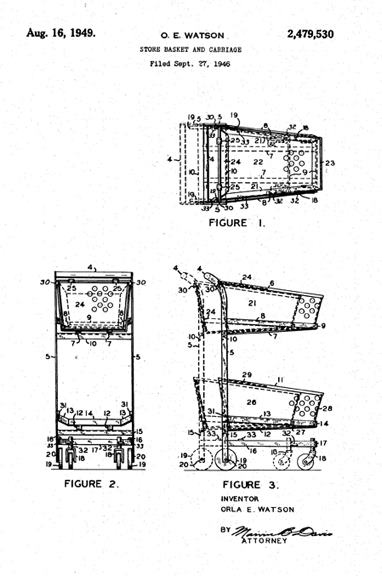
Original patent documents of Orla Watson showing design of the nesting feature of the Telescope Cart. The rear of the cart swings forward when a cart is shoved into it, hence the nesting feature.

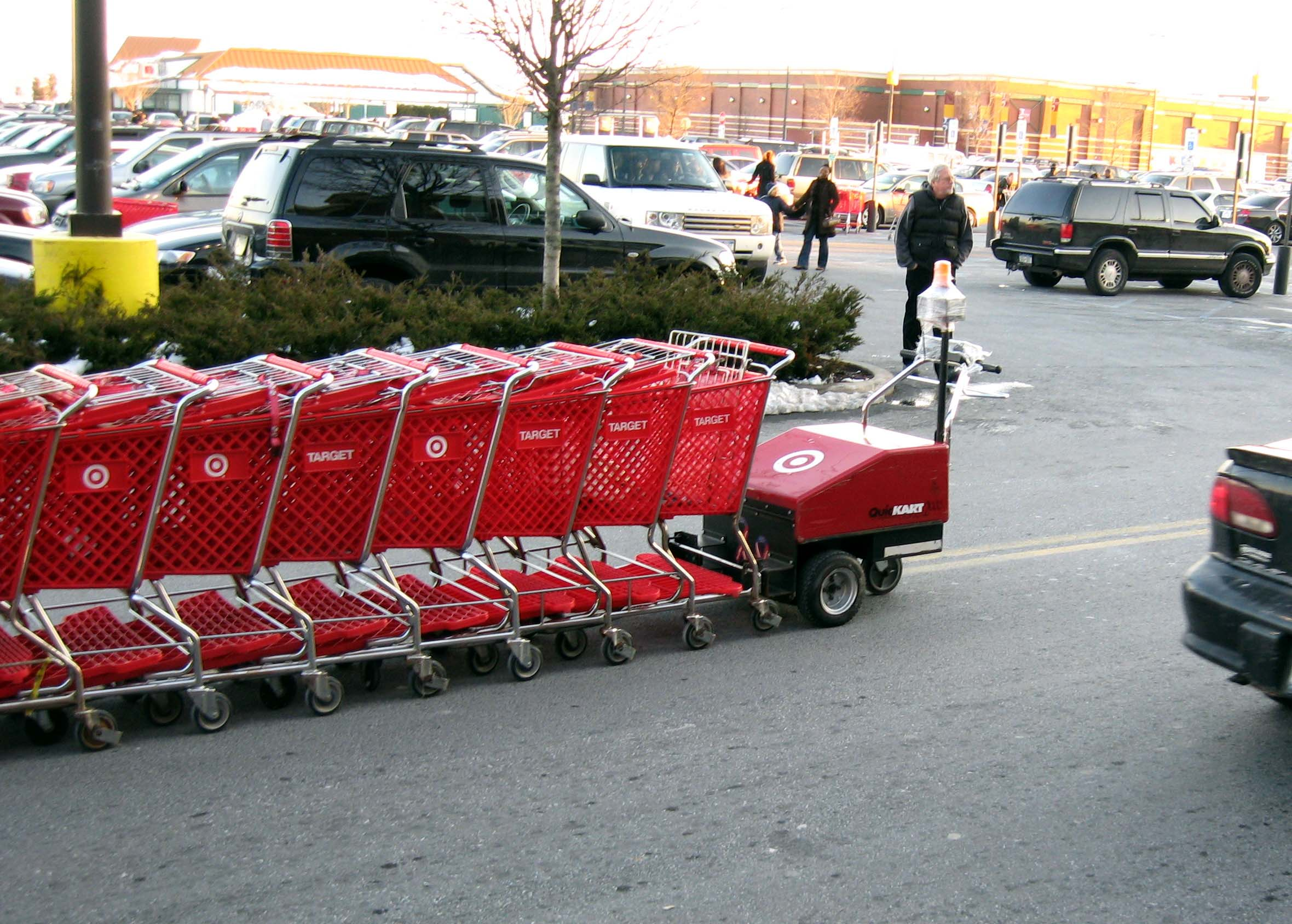
Nested carts being returned from a parking lot to a Target store by a cart pushing assist device

In 1946, Orla Watson devised a system for a telescoping (i.e., "nesting") shopping cart which did not require assembly or disassembly of its parts before and after use like Goldman's cart; Goldman's design up until this point required that the cart be unfolded much like a folding chair. This cart could be fitted into another cart for compact storage via a swinging one-way rear door. The swinging rear door formed the basis of the patent claim, and was a major innovation in the evolution of the modern shopping cart. Watson applied for a patent on his shopping cart invention in 1946, but Goldman contested it and filed an application for a similar patent with the swinging door feature on a shopping cart with only one basket in 1948 which Goldman named the "Nest-Kart". After considerable litigation and allegations of patent infringement, Goldman relinquished his rights to the patent in 1949 to Watson and his company, Telescope Carts, Inc. realizing that the swinging rear door feature was the key to Watson's patent. Watson was awarded patent #2,479,530 on August 16, 1949. In exchange, Goldman was granted an exclusive licensing right in addition to the three other licenses previously granted; Telescope Carts, Inc. continued to receive royalties for each cart produced by Goldman's company that incorporated the "nesting" design. This included any shopping cart utilizing his hinged rear door, including the familiar single basket "nesting" designs similar to those used in the present.

Owing to its overwhelming success, many different manufacturers desired to produce shopping carts with the rear swinging door feature but were denied due to the exclusive license issued to Goldman. The federal government filed a lawsuit against Telescope Carts, Inc. in 1950 alleging the exclusive license granted to Goldman was invalid, and a Consent Decree was entered into where Telescope Carts, Inc. agreed to offer the same license to any manufacturer. Orla Watson and Telescope Carts, Inc. licensed their telescoping shopping cart design to several manufacturers throughout the 1950s and 1960s until the patent expired.

=== New developments ===
In 2012, a driverless shopping cart was made by Chaotic Moon Labs. The device, called "Project Sk8" or "Smarter Cart" was basically a cart fitted with Windows Kinect (to detect obstacles), and an electric drivetrain, and used in conjunction with a Windows 8 tablet. For smaller stores, shopping baskets with wheels can be used either as a large basket or a small cart. These carts are designed for indoor use only.

In 2017, a mobile device shelf was added to shopping carts at Target stores to support the digital in-store shopping experience. The shelf was invented and designed by Nick Dyer, a former employee of Target. The introduction of "EASY Shopper" in 2019 by Pentland Firth Software GmbH in partnership with the German retailer EDEKA represents another step in the evolution of shopping carts. Equipped with a tablet, barcode scanner, and cashierless checkout system, the smart shopping cart aims to provide customers with a more streamlined and convenient shopping experience. The system utilizes computer vision to accurately track items in the cart and allow customers to scan and pay for their purchases as they shop, reducing the need to stand in line and wait to pay for their items.

== Retail store acceptance ==
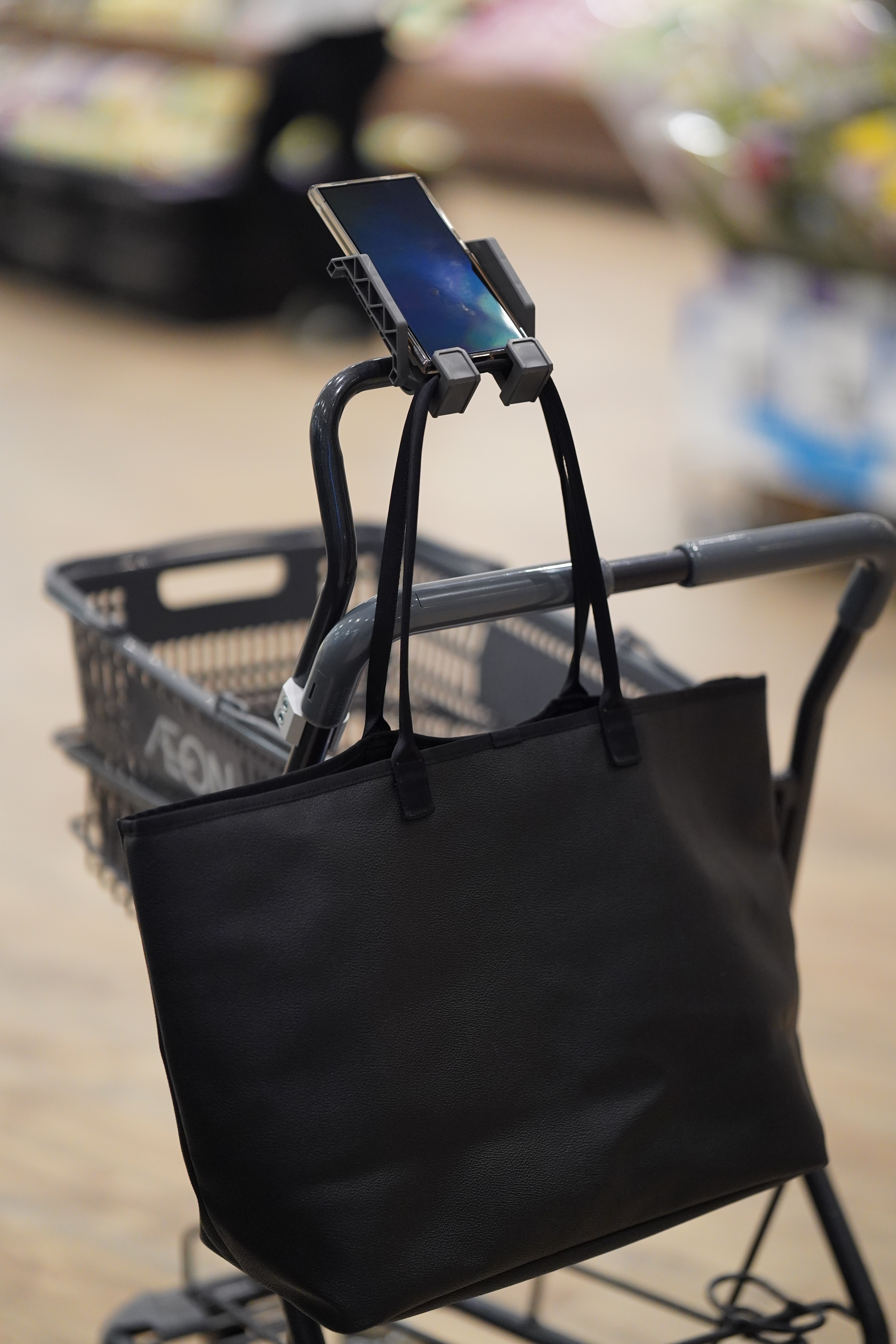
Japanese shopping cart with smartphone holder fixed in place above the handlebar

Past studies determined that retailers who did not offer shopping carts such as Sears suffered lower sales in comparison to retailers who did use shopping carts. Subsequent to the introduction of shopping carts and centralized checkout lines at Sears stores, the company noticed a correlating increase in sales.

In 2004, British supermarket chain Tesco trialed shopping carts with user-adjustable wheel resistance, heart rate monitoring and calorie counting hardware in an effort to raise awareness of health issues. The cart's introduction coincided with Tesco's sponsorship of Cancer Research UK's fundraising event Race for Life.

Also in 2004, shopping carts were identified as a source of pathogens and became a major public health concern. This was primarily due to the media spotlight on a Japanese research study revealing large amounts of bacteria on shopping carts. Those findings were later backed by a University of Arizona study in 2007.

In 2009, researchers developed prototypes of computerized context aware shopping carts by attaching tablet computers to ordinary carts. Initial field trials showed that the prototype's context awareness provided an opportunity for enhancing and altering the shopping experience.

Some retailers, such as Target, have begun using carts fully made of recycled plastic with the only metal part being the wheel axles, drawing away from the established metal cart design. Target's cart has won design awards for its improved casters, interchangeable plastic parts to simplify repairs, and handles that improve maneuverability. Other cart designs also incorporate additional features such as a cup holder for cold or hot drinks or a bouquet of flowers, along with other features such as a secure shelf for a tablet computer or mobile phone to allow the use of mobile coupons and circulars, or as seen in an all-plastic design created for the Wisconsin-based Festival Foods and also used by Whole Foods Market by Bemis Manufacturing Company, all of these features, along with extra rungs on the side rail designed to attach plastic bags or carry handles for beverages. Smaller half-sized carts for smaller shopping trips have also become common.

== Deposits ==
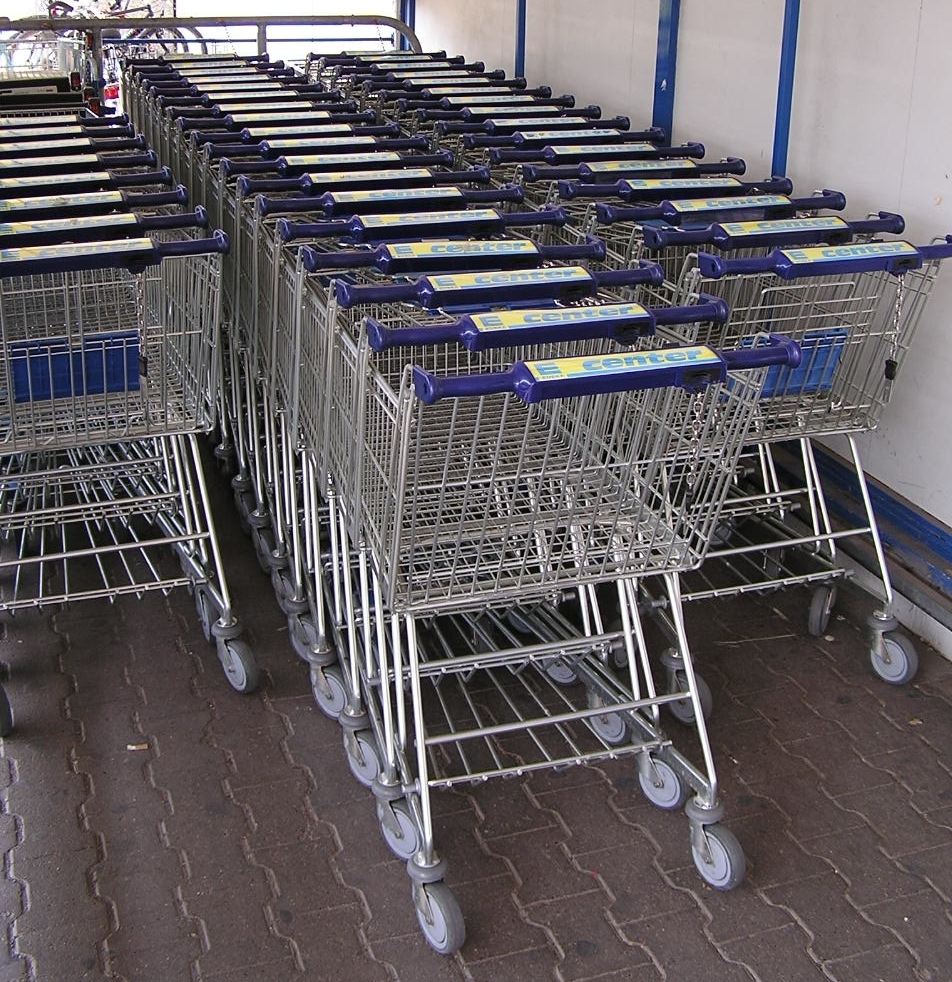
Shopping carts locked with a chain

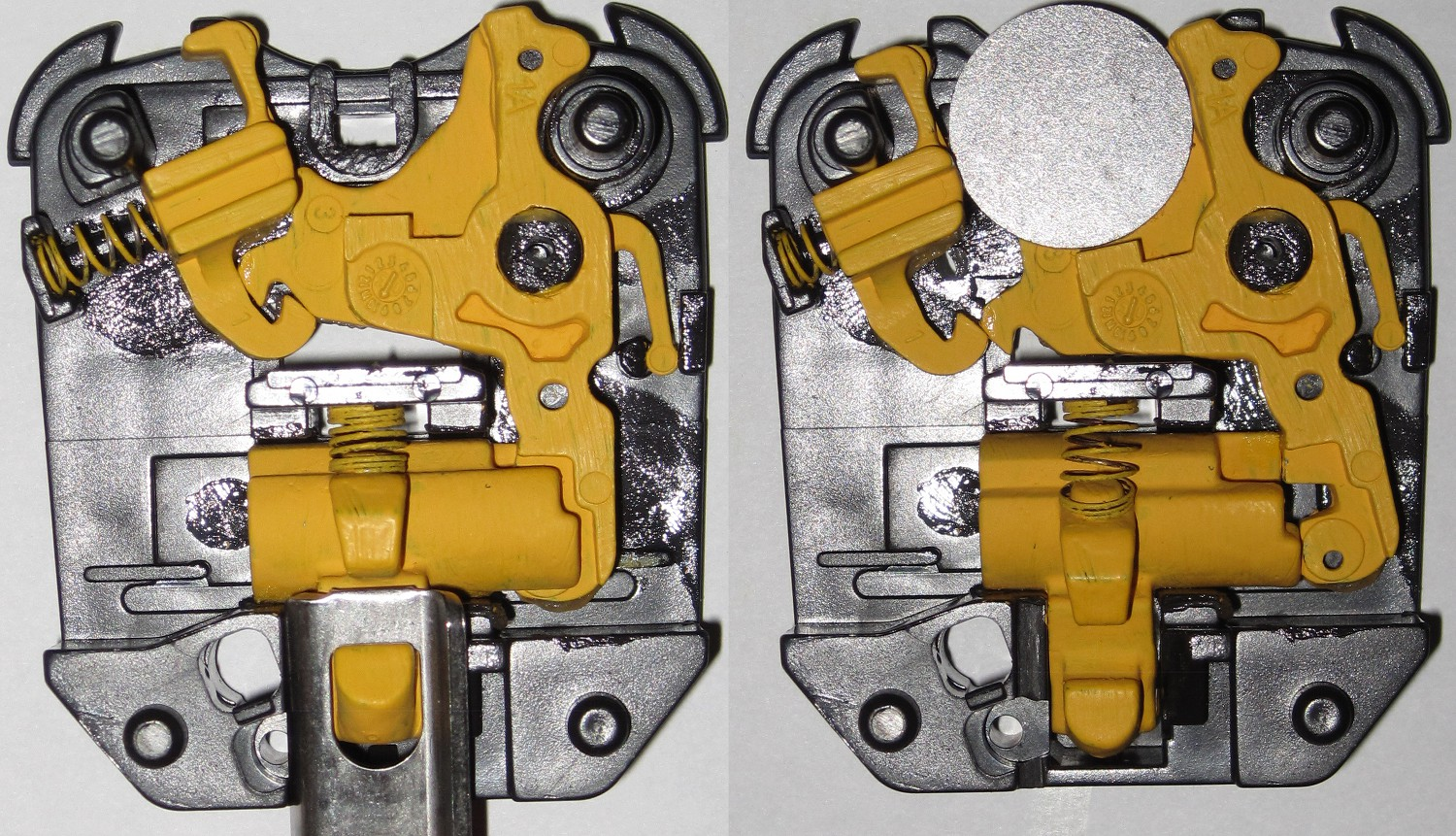
Mechanism of a typical shopping cart lock

In many stores, the user inserts a coin, token or card to unlock the cart, which is returned when they return it. A lock mounted on the handle connects it to other carts or to a fixed point.

The deposit system reduces the expense of gathering carts, avoids damage done by runaway carts, and makes it less likely that carts will be removed from the premises. Carts that are not returned by the user may be returned by someone else, with the deposit coin acting as a reward.

Although almost ubiquitous in continental Europe and the UK, the system is less common in Canada and rare in the United States, with the exception of the former Real Superstore (Schnucks) (earlier a subsidiary of a Canadian firm), ALDI, and some locations of Costco and ShopRite.

In Australia, deposit systems are common in some local government areas, as they have been made compulsory by local law. Usually, all ALDI stores, and most Coles and Woolworths stores will have a lock mechanism on their carts that requires a $1 or $2 coin to unlock.

The deposit varies, but usually coins of higher value, such as €1, £1, or $1, are used. The mechanism often allows use of counterfeit coins. Cart collectors have a special key to unlock the carts when needed.

Some retailers sell tokens as an alternative to coins, often for charity. Merchandising companies also offer branded shopping tokens.

== Theft prevention ==
Shopping cart theft can be a costly problem with stores that use them. The carts, which typically cost between $75 and $150 each, with some models costing $300–400, are removed by people for various purposes. To prevent theft, estimated at $800 million worldwide per annum, stores use various security systems as discussed below.

=== Cart retrieval service ===
Most retailers in North America utilize a cart retrieval service, which collects carts found off the store's premises and returns them to the store for a fee. The primary strength of this system is the ability of pedestrian customers to take purchases home and allow retailers to recapture abandoned carts in a timely manner at a fraction of the cost of a replacement cart. It also allows retailers to maintain their cart inventories without an expensive capital outlay. A drawback of this method is that it is reactive, instead of proactively preventing the carts from leaving the store premises.

=== Electronic and magnetic ===
Electronic systems are sometimes used by retailers. Each shopping cart is fitted with an electronic locking wheel clamp, or "boot". A transmitter with a thin wire is placed around the perimeter of the parking lot, and the boot locks when the cart leaves the designated area. Store personnel must then deactivate the lock with a handheld remote control to return the cart to stock. Often, a line is painted in front of the broadcast range to warn customers that their cart will stop when rolled past the line. However, these systems are very expensive to install and although helpful, are not foolproof. The wheels can be lifted over the electronic barrier and/or pushed hard enough that the locks break. There are also safety concerns if the person pushing the trolley is running, and also if the trolley does not lock and is taken onto a road, locking due to magnetic materials under the road. Some cities have required retailers to install locking wheel systems on their shopping carts. In some cases, electronic systems companies have encouraged passage of such laws to create a captive audience of potential customers.

=== Physical ===
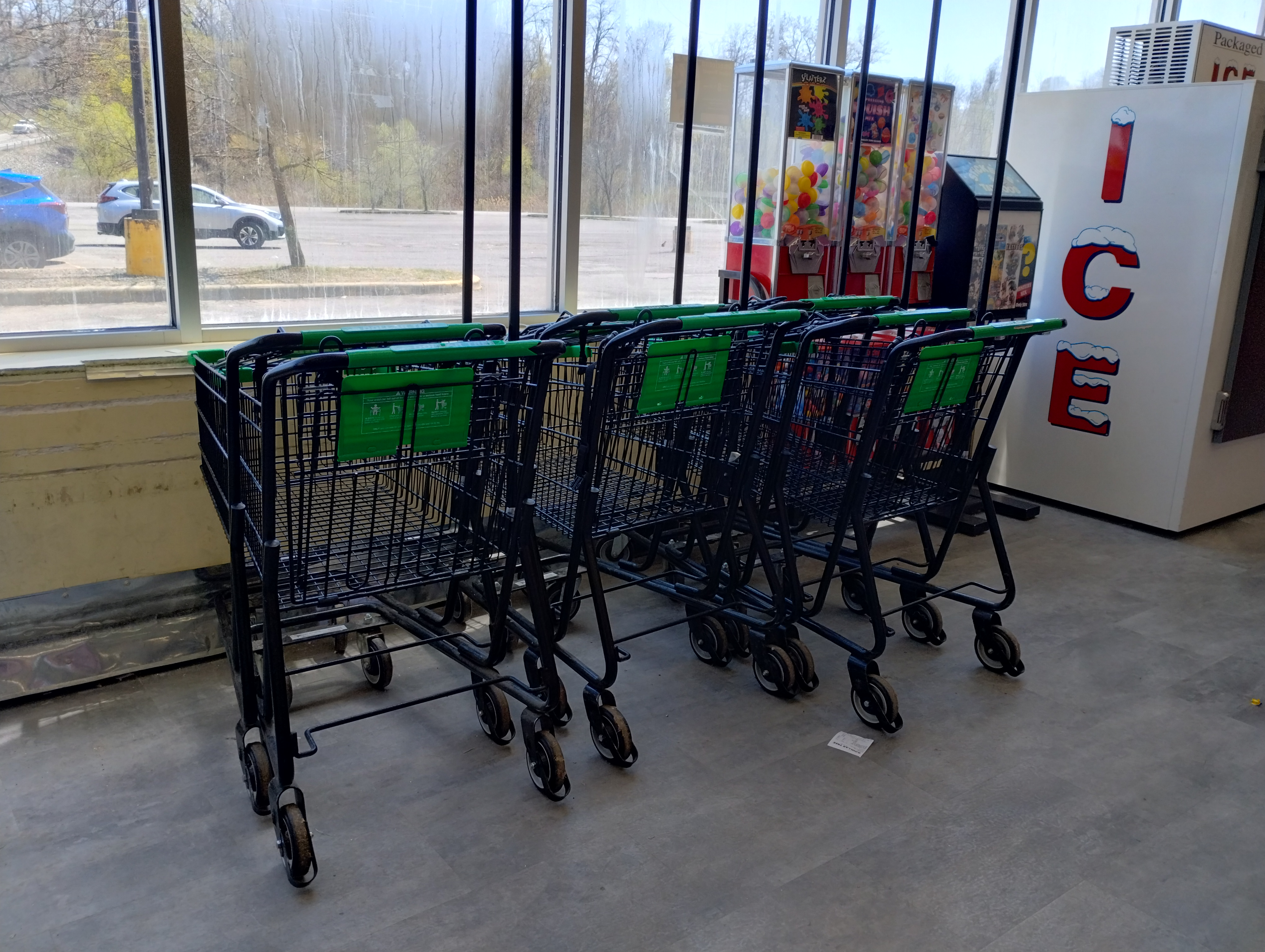
Shopping carts equipped with anti-theft poles mounted to the side

A low-tech form of theft prevention utilizes a physical impediment, such as vertical posts at the store entrance to keep carts from being taken into the parking lot. This method also impedes physically disabled customers, which may be illegal in many jurisdictions. For example, in the United States it would be a violation of the Americans with Disabilities Act of 1990.

Another method (used for example by UK supermarket Iceland) is to mount a pole taller than the entrance, onto the shopping cart, so that the pole will block exit of the cart. However, this method requires that the store aisles be higher than the pole, including lights, piping, any overhead signage and fixtures. It also prevents customers from carting their purchases to their cars in the store's carts. Many customers learn to bring their own folding or otherwise collapsible cart with them, which they can usually hang on the store's cart while shopping.

A further system is to use a cattle grid style system. All pedestrian exits have specially designed flooring tiles, which, along with specially designed wheels on the cart, will immobilize the cart as they roll onto them. Like the magnetic systems, this can easily be overcome by lifting the cart over the tiles.

== Name ==
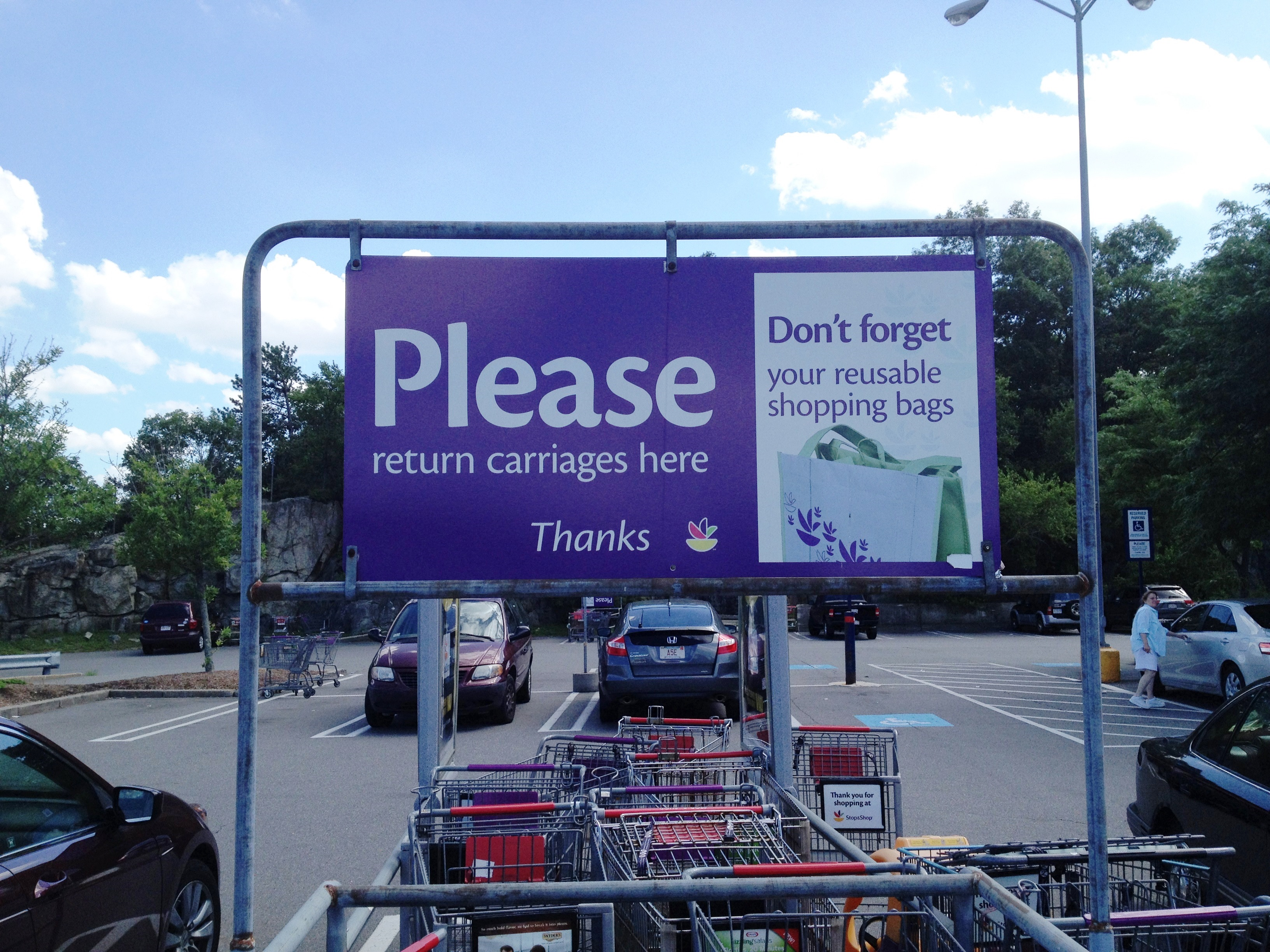
Carriage return at a Stop & Shop in Saugus, Massachusetts

The names of shopping carts vary by region. The following names are region-specific names for shopping carts. Many of these names may be used alone or in descriptive phrases such as grocery ____, shopping ____, or supermarket ____ for disambiguation:

- cart or basket – the United States, Canada and the Philippines
- trolley – the United Kingdom, Ireland, Australia, New Zealand, Malaysia, Trinidad and Tobago, South Africa and some regions of Canada. Was also formerly used in the Philippines
- carriage – used by some in the New England region of the United States
- barrae or coohudder – some places in Scotland
- bascart – various regions
- buggy – Southern U.S.
- wagon – New York, Hawaii
- trundler – some places in New Zealand
- wheelbasket – some places in the Eastern United States, notably Western Massachusetts

== Accessibility ==
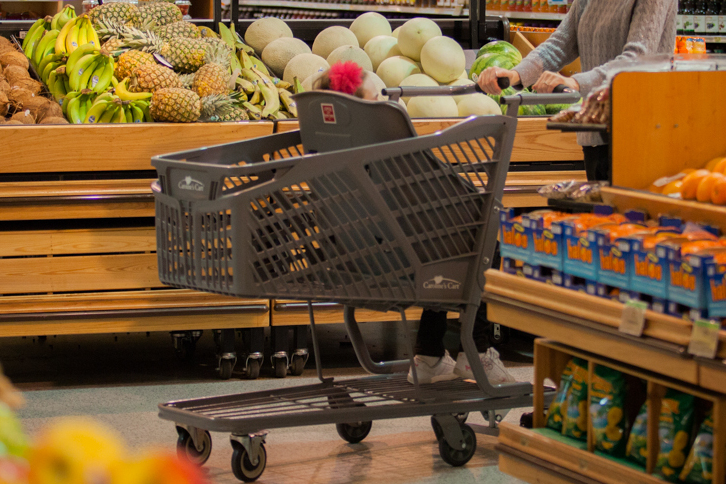
Side profile of a Caroline's Cart with occupant

Special electronic shopping carts are provided by many retailers for the elderly or disabled people. These are essentially electric wheelchairs with an attached basket. They allow customers to navigate around the store and collect items.

Manually powered carts are also available specifically designed for use by wheelchair users. A still-to-be-implemented aid for people with disabilities is the addition of a guide wheel at the center of rotation of a cart with four caster wheels. In order to allow the nesting of carts to be unhindered, this guide wheel is attached to the front of the cart with a piece of spring steel which bends under the cart's weight.

Caroline's Carts are designed for aiding non-ambulatory adults or larger children, but require an additional person to push.

== In art ==
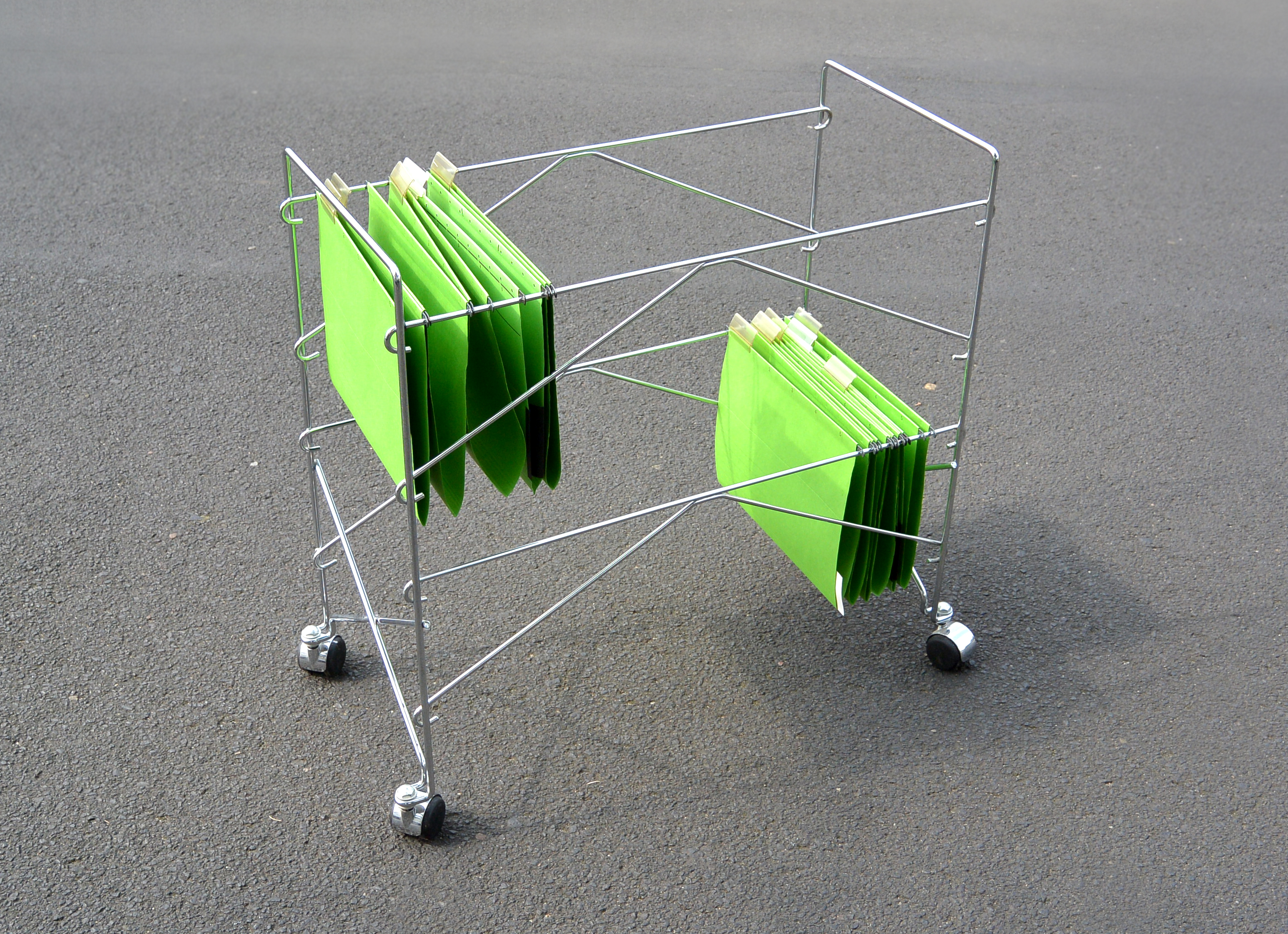
Hanging file, designed by Otl Aicher, manufactured by Brüder Siegel, Leipheim

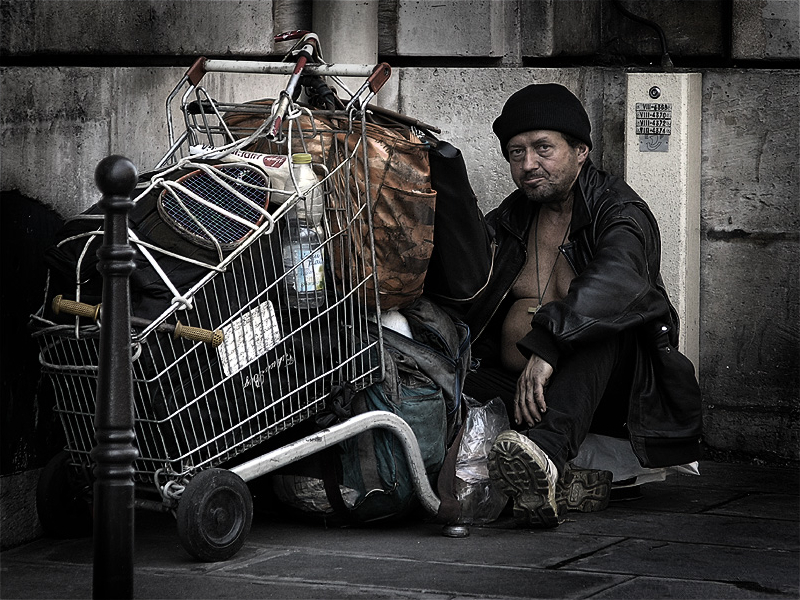
Homeless man with a shopping cart in Paris

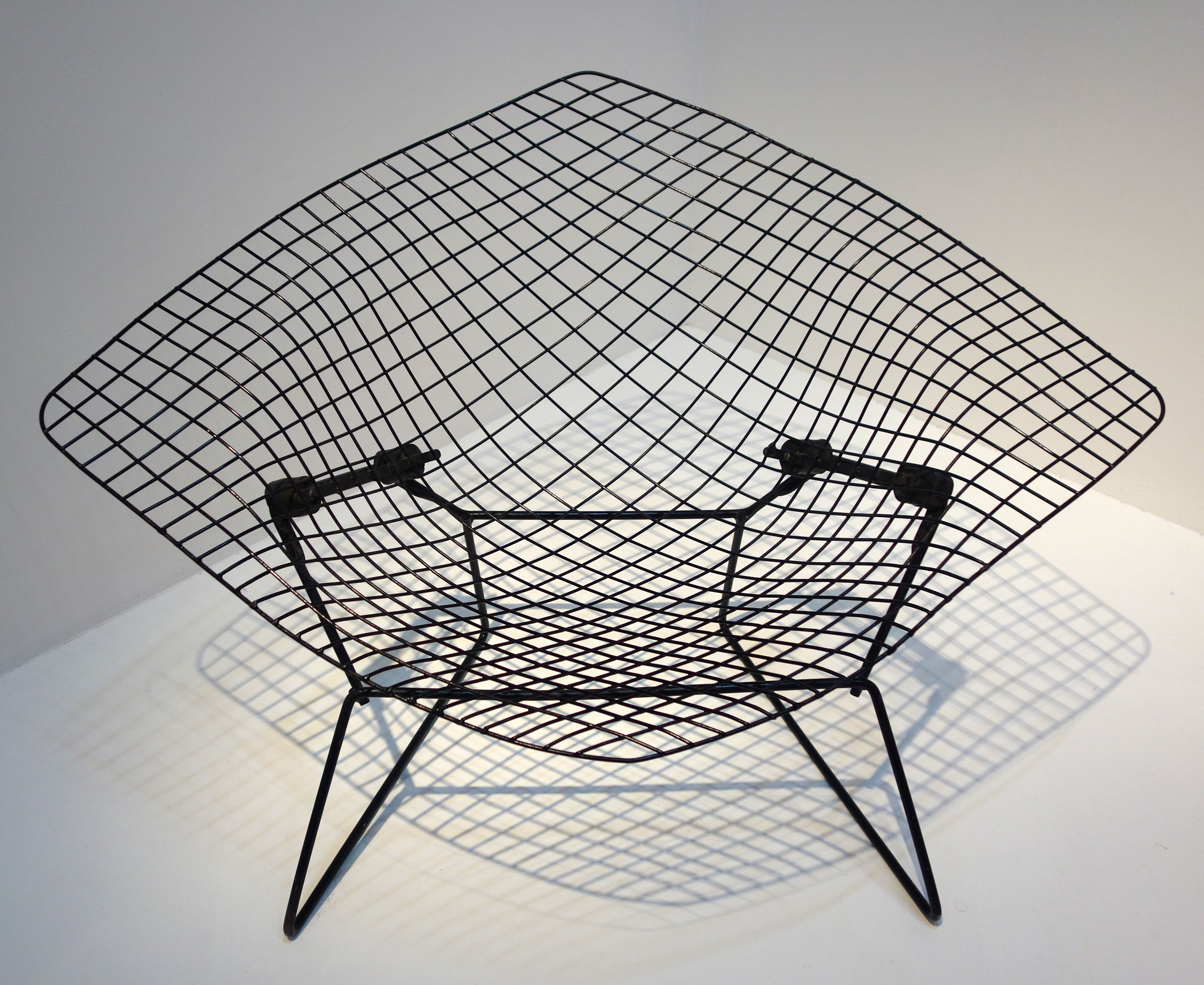
Diamond Chair by Harry Bertoia

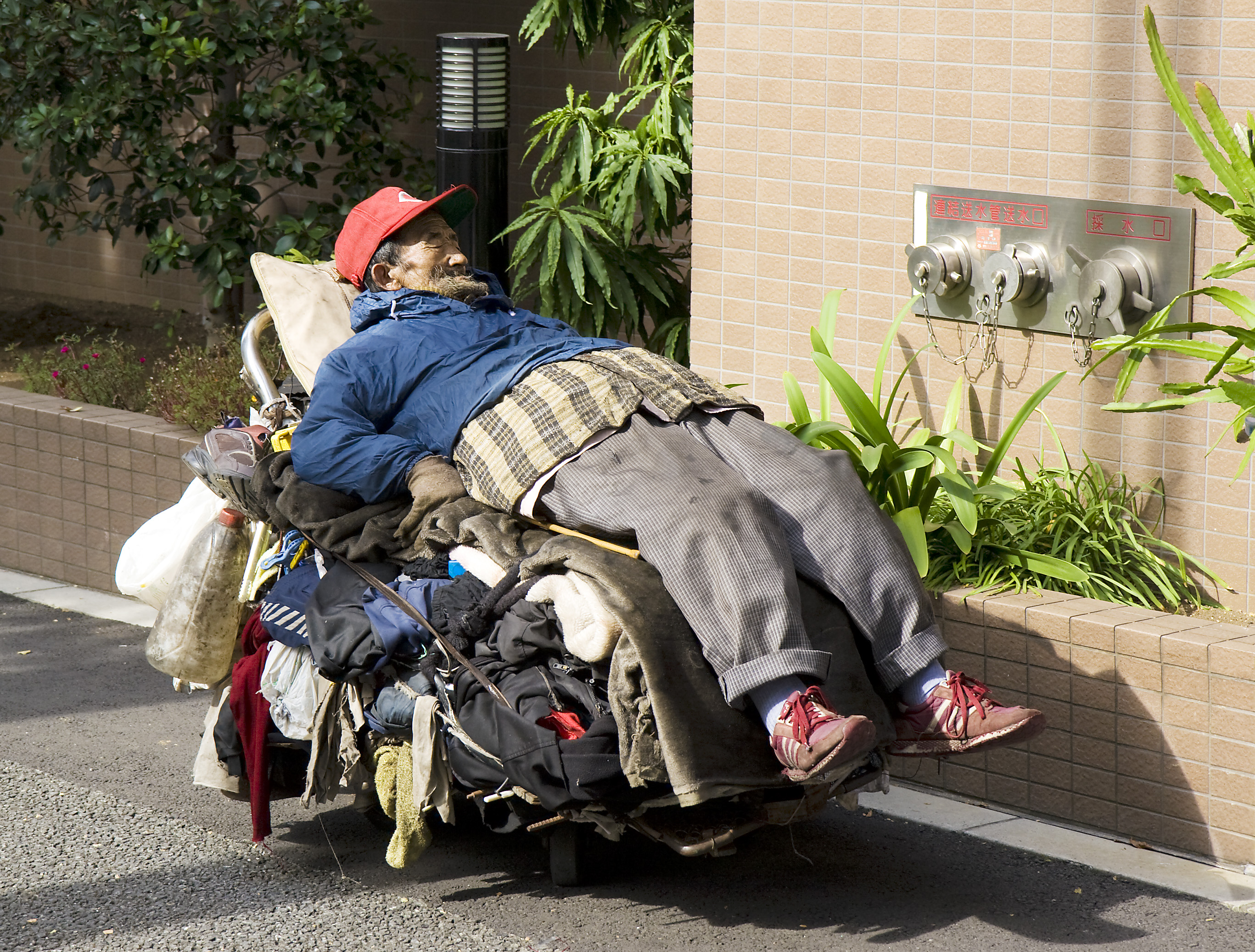
Homeless man lying on a shopping cart in Tokyo

Shopping cart manufacturers such as Caddie, Wanzl, or Brüder Siegel maintained intensive direct and indirect mutual business relations with artists, graphic designers, industrial and furniture designers such as Charles Eames, Harry Bertoia, or Verner Panton since the market launch of the shopping cart - not only for new and further developments of their own shopping carts and wire basket goods, but also for advertising and PR purposes. Olivier Mourgue, Otl Aicher, Stiletto as well as other artists and designers had wire furniture or artwork made by shopping cart manufacturers.

One of the most famous thematizations of a shopping cart in art is the 1970 sculpture "Supermarket Lady" by US pop artist Duane Hanson, which is critical of consumerism.

In 1983, the neoist "one-man artist group" Stiletto Studios, from Berlin converted a 'stray' shopping cart into an 'inverted' cantilever-wire chair on the principle of objet trouvé. As a design simulation critical of consumer culture, Stiletto's ironically titled "Consumer's Rest" Lounge Chair recurred to the fact that Eames' and Bertoia's wire furniture were already over-aestheticized adaptations of the contemporary advent of shopping carts in the United States, and thus were themselves already recursions to the consumer revolutionary context of the International Style in architecture and design.

Another example is found in Massurrealism, a grass-roots genre started in 1992. This art movement merges surrealism with mass media, and was inspired by the use of the shopping cart to comment on contemporary society's mass media saturation and consumer-driven culture.

By far, most stolen shopping carts that are not returned and left outside their location, however, are misappropriated by occasional subsequent and secondary users without any artistic or cultural-critical readymade intentions as emergency solutions. Other uses of shopping carts include improvised pieces of furniture (for example, as laundry baskets), or universal nomadic furniture for the household goods of the homeless, or, ignoring the fact that the zinc and plastic coatings of the wire surfaces are harmful to health when heated, as ad hoc barbecue grills.

== See also ==
- Motorized shopping cart
- Shopping cart theory
- Toy wagon
- Trolley (disambiguation)
