= Sylvan Goldman =

American businessman and inventor

- Sylvan Goldman
- Born: Sylvan Nathan Goldman; November 15, 1898; Ardmore, Indian Territory, U.S.
- Died: November 25, 1984 (aged 86); Oklahoma City, Oklahoma, U.S.
- Occupation: Businessman
- Known for: Supermarket developer Inventor of the shopping cart
- Spouse: Margaret Katz
- Children: Monte Goldman; Alfred Goldman
- Parent(s): Michael Goldman; Hortense Dreyfus

Sylvan Nathan Goldman (November 15, 1898 – November 25, 1984) was an American businessman and inventor of the modern shopping cart. His design had a pair of large wire baskets connected by tubular metal arms with four wheels.

== Early life ==
Goldman was born Sylvan Nathan Goldman to a Jewish family, the son of Hortense (born Dreyfus) and Michael Goldman, in Ardmore, Indian Territory. His mother had emigrated from Scharrachbergheim in Alsace-Lorraine (today France) and his father from Latvia. He had one older brother, Alfred. His father worked at various dry goods stores owned by his wife's family, one of which was located in Indian territory where Sylvan was born. Sylvan was raised in the Jewish faith and was bar mitzvahed. Sylvan learned the retail trade from his father and his mother's uncles.

Goldman served in World War I as a food requisitionist in France. His brother served in the US Army but was discharged for health reasons. Goldman was not educated past the eighth grade.

== Career ==
After the war, in 1919, Sylvan and his brother Alfred opened the Goldman Brothers Wholesale Fruits and Produce in Breckenridge, Texas. They were initially very successful due to the then oil boom in Texas, but their situation quickly deteriorated once the boom ended. The brothers then moved to California, where they worked for grocery wholesalers. Initially planning on opening their own wholesale food business in California, they instead returned to Oklahoma at the behest of their uncles who wanted to start their own retail food store chain. The uncles offered to put up all the money as well as to cede the brothers a 75% interest in the venture. Accepting the generous offer and armed with an understanding of a new store concept that they had seen in California, the "supermarket" – where all different types of food were available for sale in a single store and customers served themselves – they returned to Oklahoma and founded the state's first supermarket, the Sun Grocery Company. They opened their first store on April 3, 1920, at 1403 East Fifteenth Street in Tulsa, Oklahoma, with Sylvan serving as president and Alfred as vice president. Within one year, they were operating twenty-one Sun Grocery markets throughout the state. Within three years, they had fifty-five stores.

In 1929, they sold the Sun chain to Skaggs-Safeway Stores several months before the Stock Market Crash of 1929. Despite reaping a generous and timely sum from the Safeway sale, Goldman and his brother lost much of their fortune in the crash; and being banned from competing with Safeway in Tulsa due to a non-competition agreement, they moved to Oklahoma City where they purchased five grocery stores and formed a new company called Standard Grocery. They soon implemented the lessons they had learned in Tulsa and with their profits purchased the faltering Humpty-Dumpty grocery store chain in 1934. Alfred died in 1937.

In 1943, Sylvan merged the two brands into one company: Standard-Humpty Dumpty. Concerned with alleviating the difficulty women had with the self-serve concept as they often had to handle both the shopping basket and children, he developed what was to become the shopping cart.

=== Invention of shopping cart ===
He introduced the device on June 4, 1937, in the Humpty Dumpty supermarket chain in Oklahoma City, of which he was the owner. With the assistance of a mechanic named Fred Young, Goldman constructed the first shopping cart, basing his design on that of a wooden folding chair. They built it with a metal frame and added wheels and wire baskets. Another mechanic, Arthur Kosted, developed a method to mass-produce the carts by inventing an assembly line capable of forming and welding the wire. The cart was awarded patent number 2,196,914 on April 9, 1940 (Filing date: March 14, 1938), titled, "Folding Basket Carriage for Self-Service Stores". They advertised the invention as part of a new "No Basket Carrying Plan."

The shopping cart was not initially a success. After hiring several male and female models to push his new invention around his store and demonstrate their utility, as well as greeters to explain their use, his folding-style shopping carts became extremely popular and Goldman became a multimillionaire by collecting a royalty on every folding design shopping cart in the United States.

In 1977, Goldman was interviewed by CBS reporter Charles Kuralt:

Kuralt: What would our country be like if you'd never invented the shopping cart?

Goldman: Oh, I'll tell you, it'd be just like it is now because somebody else would have.

Sylvan Goldman also manufactured the more familiar and more modern "nesting cart" under a license granted by Telescope Carts, Inc. In 1946, Orla Watson, co-founder of Telescope Carts, Inc. developed an innovative "nesting" shopping cart that did not require disassembly after each use as Goldman's designs did, and which allowed for the shopping carts to telescope, or "nest", by simply shoving the carts together. Goldman patented his own "Nest-Kart" over a year later in 1948, so an infringement investigation was ordered by Watson of Telescope Carts, Inc. for alleged patent infringement during the same time period. In a compromise solution, Goldman agreed to relinquish his rights on his existing patent and agreed to pay the sum of $1 for infringement damages. In return, Telescope Cart, Inc. agreed to an exclusive license granted to Goldman's company for the production of the telescoping, or "nesting", cart. The telescoping cart, based on the patent issued to Watson, forms the basis of the shopping cart designs used to the present, and all royalties for the new design were paid to Telescope Carts, Inc. until their patent expired.

=== Other inventions ===
Other inventions by Goldman include the grocery sacker, the folding inter-office basket carrier, and the handy milk bottle rack. Goldman also invented the baggage cart.

== Philanthropy ==
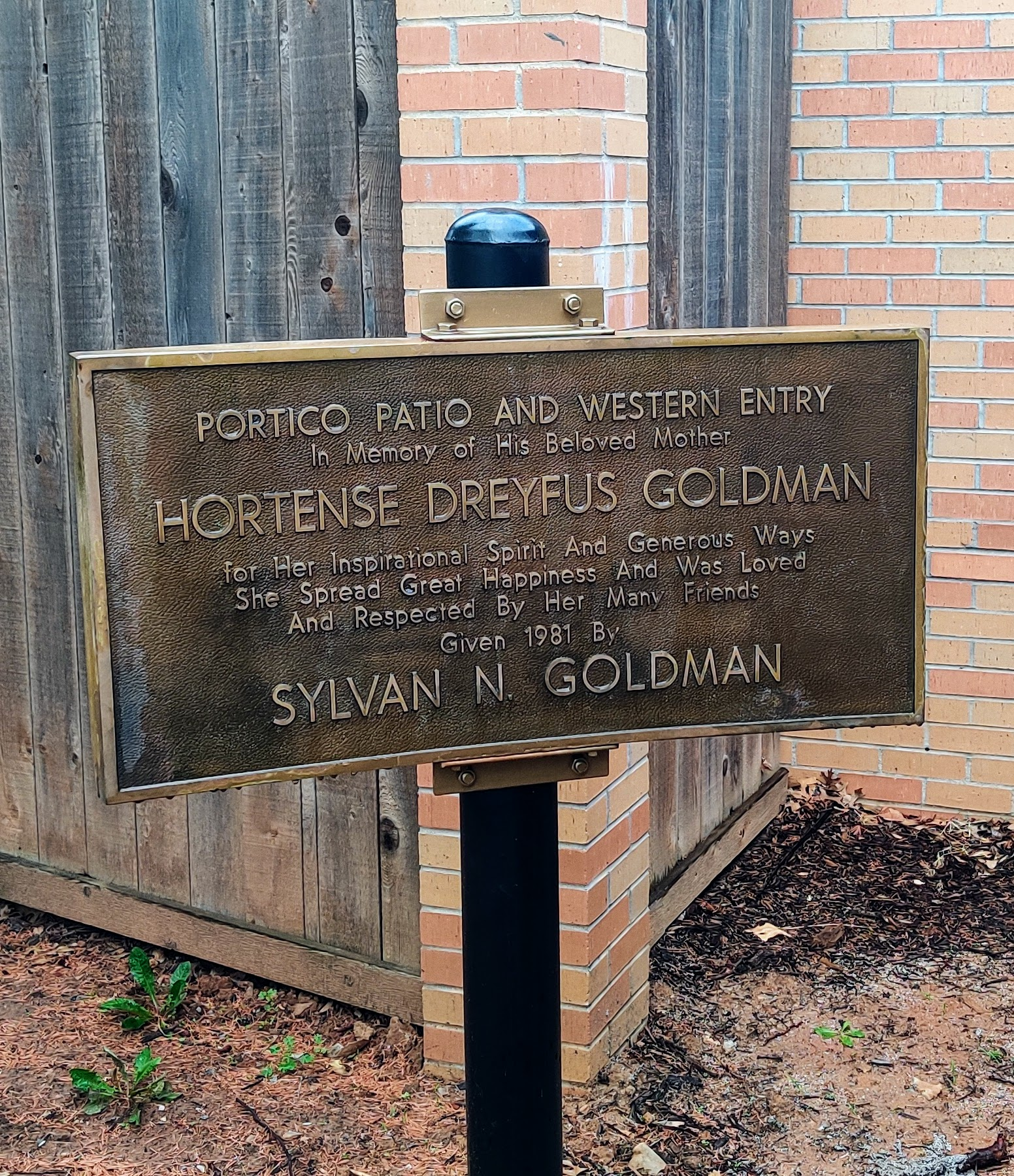

Goldman and his wife were known for their philanthropy. As a patron of the arts he contributed many works of art to Oklahoma institutions. He gave time and money to the National Conference of Christians and Jews at the Southwest Center for Human Relations at the University of Oklahoma. He received many honors, including honorary chief of the Pawnee Indian Tribe (1950), the Eleanor Roosevelt Humanities Award (1965), a Distinguished Service Citation from the University of Oklahoma (1971), induction into the Oklahoma Hall of Fame (1971), and an honorary doctor of law degree from Oklahoma City University (1974). In 1981, he funded the construction of the portico and western entry of Temple B'nai Israel (Oklahoma City). In January 1983, the Oklahoma Blood Institute moved to the Sylvan N. Goldman Center, located at 1001 North Lincoln Boulevard and named for Goldman, who donated $1.5 million for the center.

== Personal life ==
On June 7, 1931, Goldman married Margaret "Babe" Katz (1906–1984) of Stillwater, Oklahoma; they had two sons: Monte Henry Goldman and Alfred Dreyfus Goldman. Monte took his own life in 1995 and Alfred died in 1997 following a long illness.
