= Baggage cart =

Small carts for carrying luggage

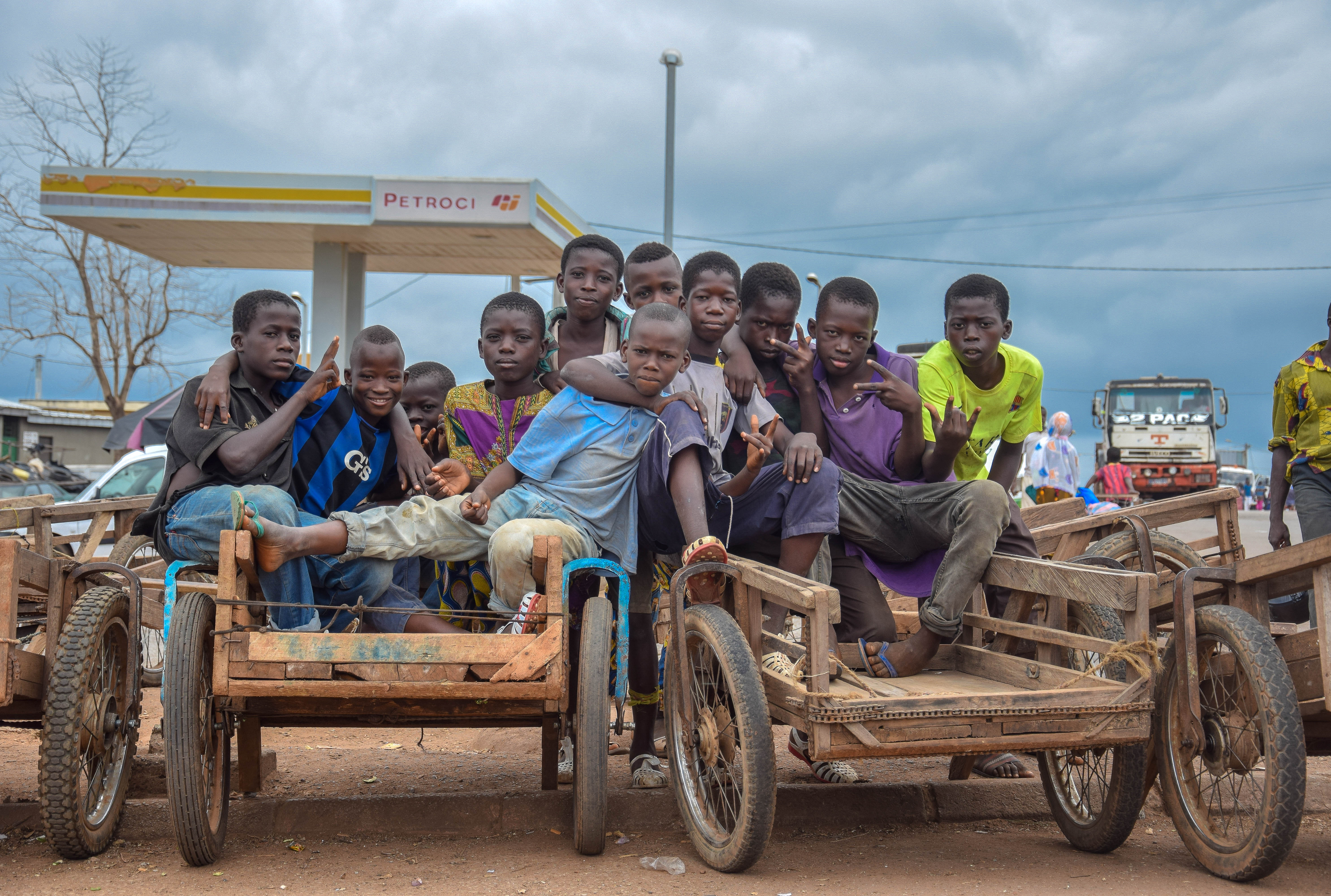
Luggage carts in Ivory Coast

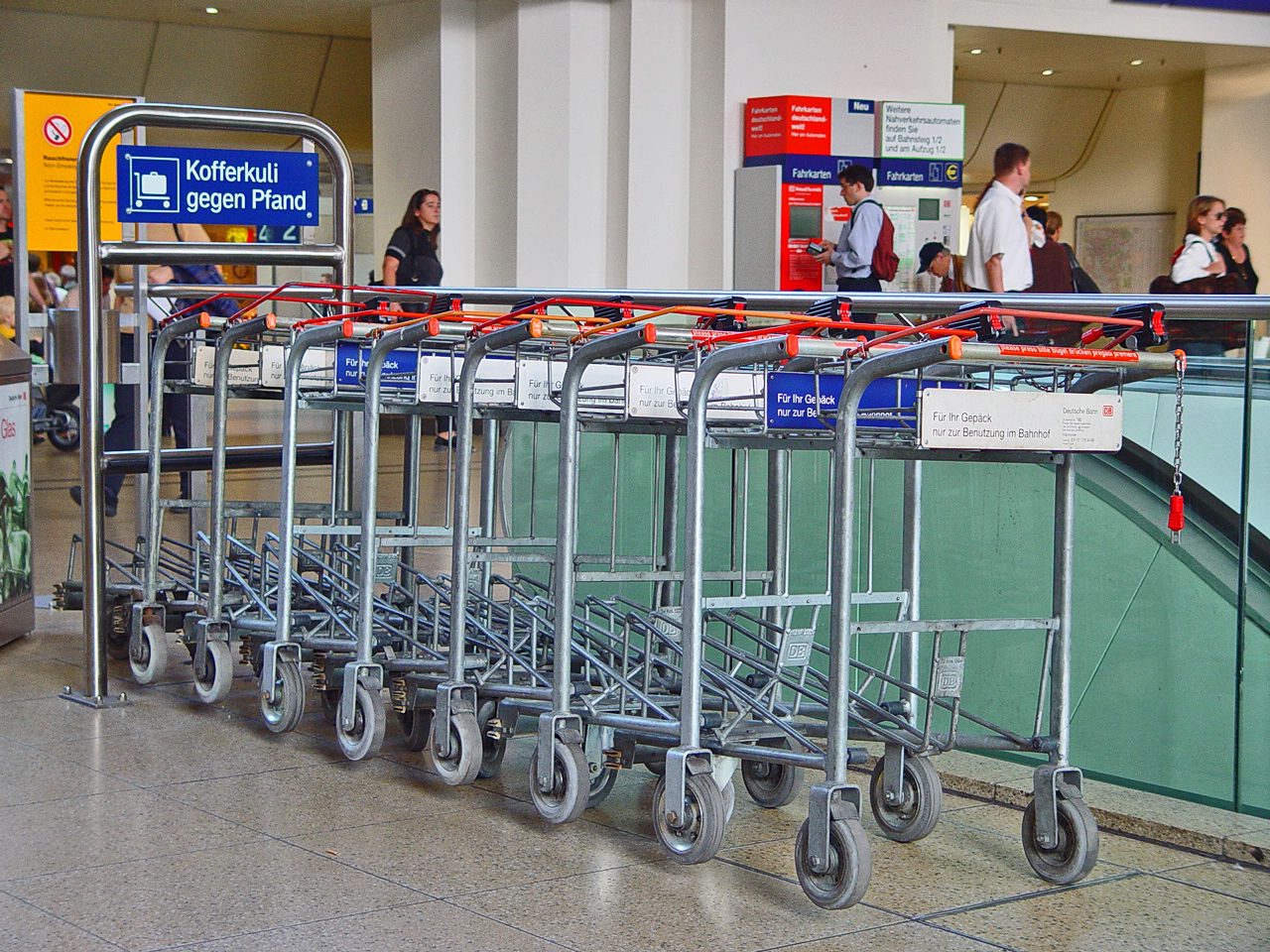
Baggage carts available for a deposit at a German train station

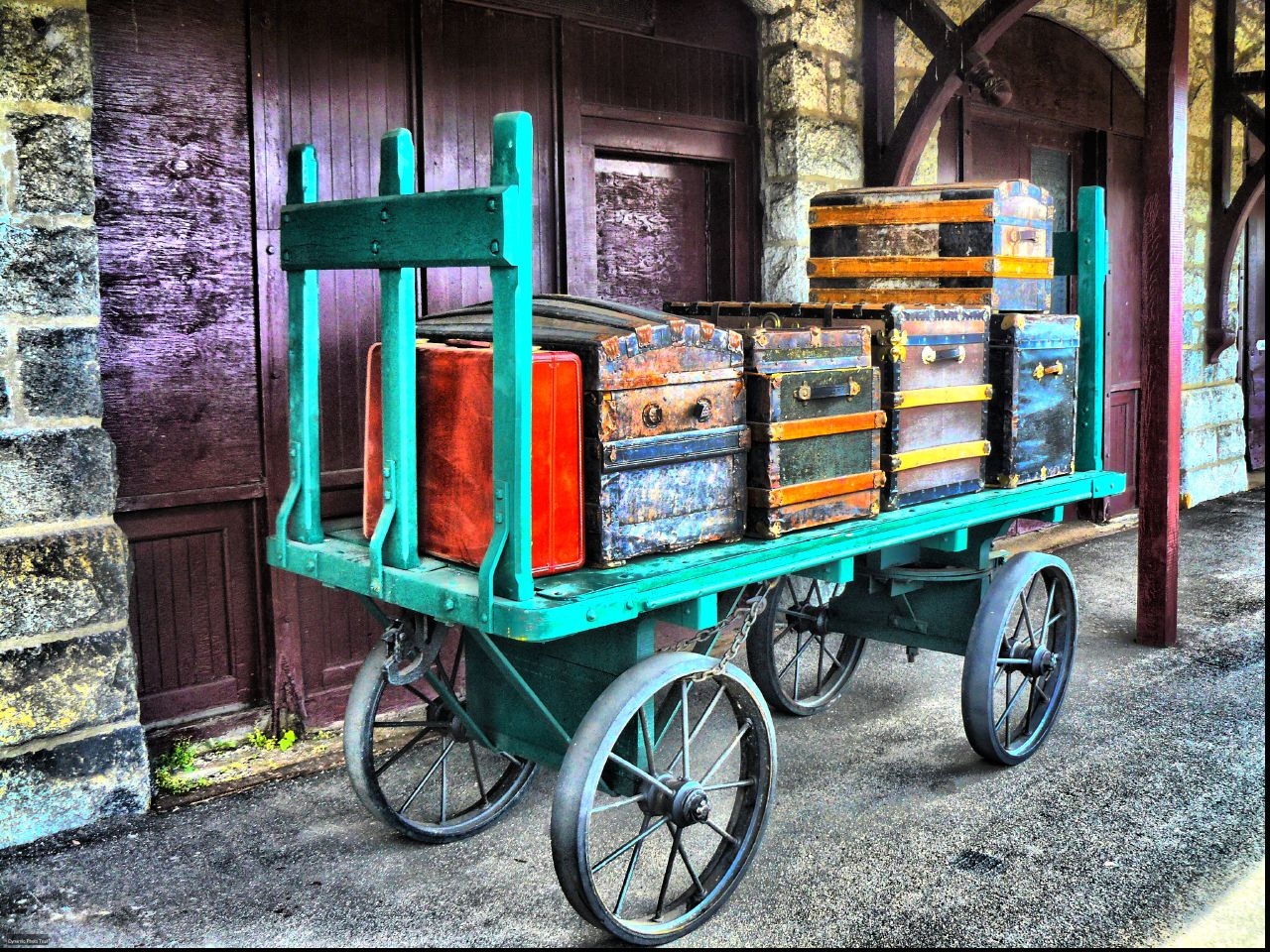
Railway baggage cart from the 1800s

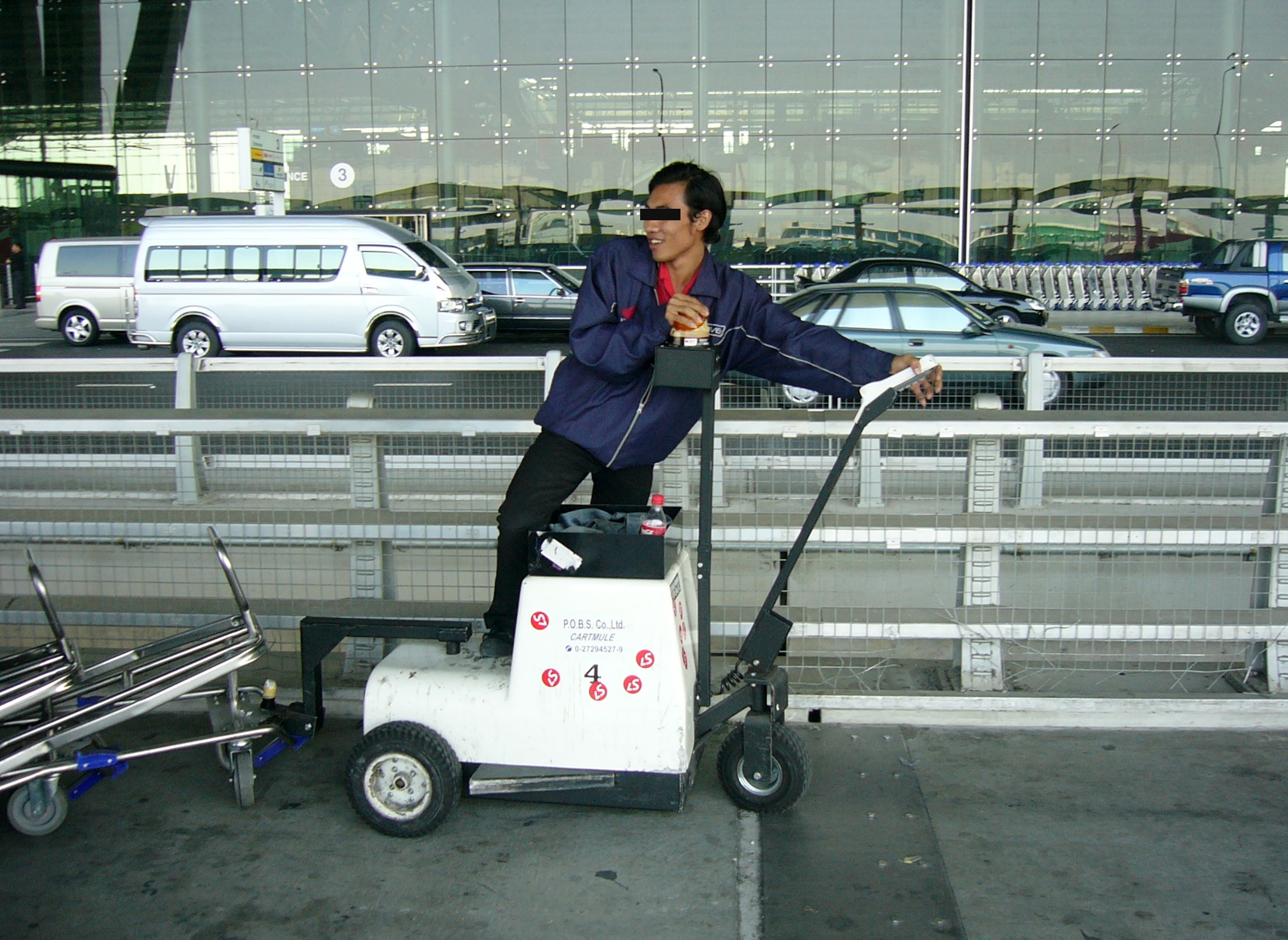
Baggage cart mover

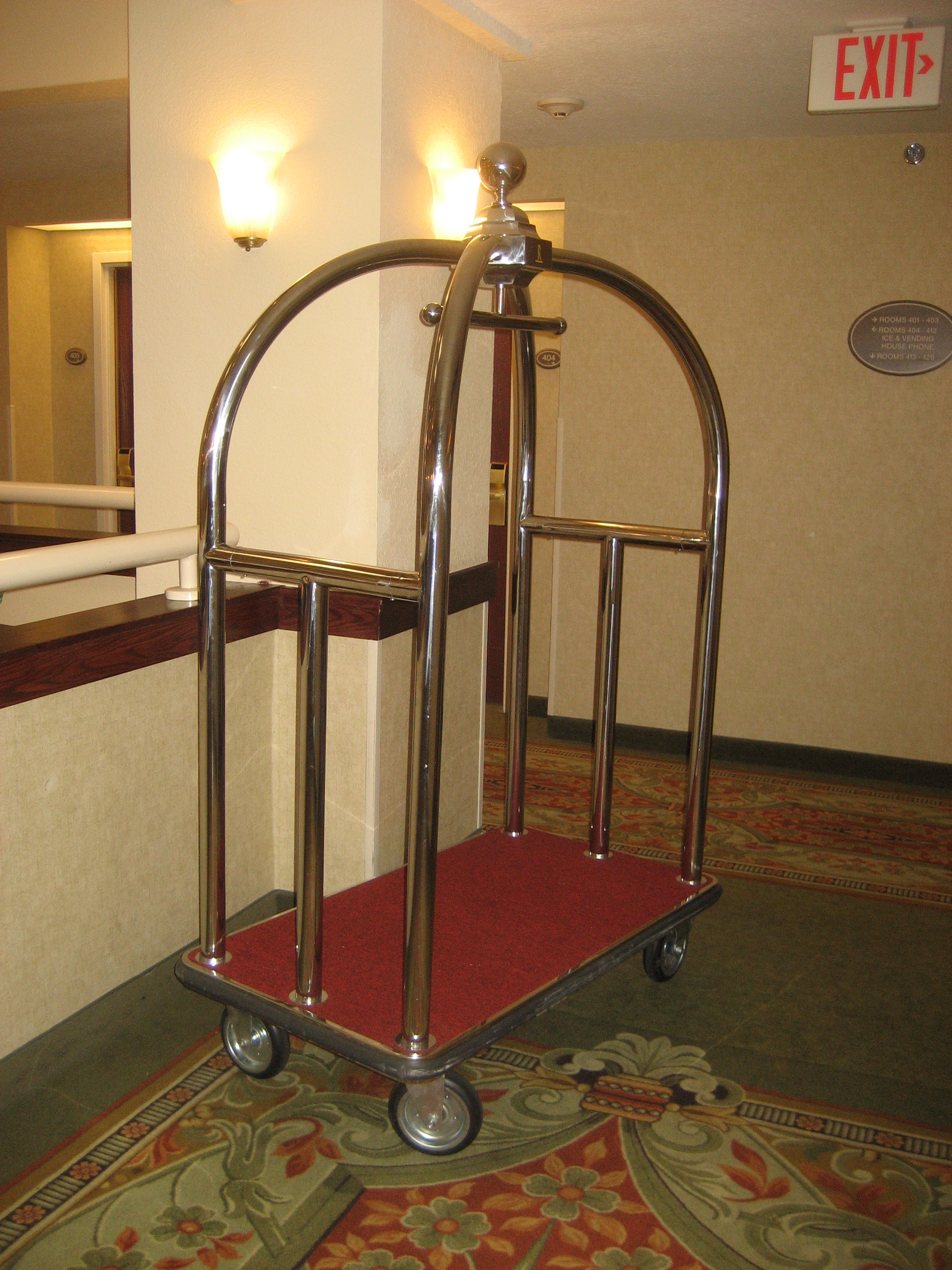
A luggage cart in a hotel hallway

Baggage carts, luggage carts, luggage trolleys or trolleys are small vehicles pushed by travelers (human-powered) to carry individual luggage, mostly suitcases. There are two major sizes: One for big luggage and one for small luggage. Carts have usually two parts for carrying luggage: A small section (basket) for carry on luggage at the same level as the handle, and a lowered large section for suitcases a small and large bags.

The carts are provided in airports, large bus stations, hotels, or train stations for transporting luggage and may be free of charge. They are sometimes owned by the operator of the establishment. In some facilities carts may be provided by a contractor such as Smarte Carte for a rental fee. Baggage carts are usually built out of steel and equipped with three or four wheels. For safety reasons, they are generally fitted with a brake. Usually, a handle has to be pushed down in order to move the cart, however, in some cases, such as London airports, the handle activates the brake. Very few carts, e.g. in developing countries such as Sri Lanka, do not have this feature.

Where a charge is made, this can be either a deposit, which is returned automatically when the cart is returned; or a rental fee can be charged.

== Parts ==
In airports, boarding baggage cart parts are:

- Brake and tow arm latch
- Brake assembly
- Bumpers
- Curtains
- Hand holds
- Pintle hook
- Tongue

== Baggage tugs ==
A baggage tug is a small tractor, sometimes an electric vehicle, used by the airline industry to tow baggage carts to and from the terminal/cargo facility and the aircraft.

== See also ==
- Flatbed trolley
- Ground support equipment
- Latch
- Pintle hook
- Sylvan Goldman, the inventor
