= My Fellow Citizens! =

2019 South Korean television series

- Promotional poster
- Hangul: 국민 여러분!
- Lit.: Fellow Citizens!
- RR: Gungmin yeoreobun!
- MR: Kungmin yŏrŏbun!
- Genre: Comedy; Crime
- Written by: Han Jung-hoon
- Directed by: Kim Jung-hyun
- Starring: Choi Si-won; Lee Yoo-young; Kim Min-jung
- Country of origin: South Korea
- Original language: Korean
- No. of episodes: 36 (Note: Wanting to circumvent Korean laws that prevent commercial breaks in the middle of an episode, what would previously have been aired as single 70 minute episodes are now being repackaged as two 35 minute episodes, with two episodes being shown each night with a commercial break between the two.)

Production
- Executive producers: Jung Hae-ryung; Seo Jang-won
- Camera setup: Single-camera
- Running time: 35 minutes
- Production companies: Monster Union; Won Contents

Original release
- Network: KBS2
- Release: April 1 – May 28, 2019

Related
- The Company You Keep

My Fellow Citizens! (Korean: 국민 여러분!; RR: Gungmin yeoreobun!) is a 2019 South Korean television series starring Choi Si-won, Lee Yoo-young and Kim Min-jung. It aired from April 1 to May 28, 2019 on KBS2.

== Synopsis ==
A con man, who gets involved with unexpected incidents, marries a police officer and somehow ends up running to become a member of the National Assembly.

== Cast ==
=== Main ===
- Choi Si-won as Yang Jung-kook, a skilled fraudster who is the third generation of a family of con artists. He gets involved with a loan shark to earn a large sum of money for his marriage, only to get scammed by his ex-girlfriend who runs off with the marriage funds.
- Lee Yoo-young as Kim Mi-young, a police detective who catches her ex-boyfriend cheating on her, but meets Jung-kook. The two become close and soon begin dating. She chooses to lie about her job to keep their relationship and finally decides to confess her true life to Jung-kook on their wedding day.
- Kim Min-jung as Park Hoo-ja, the fourth daughter of Park Sang-pil, a notorious loan shark, who trains to become his successor. Her father collapses after being a victim of a mysterious stranger's schemes. After her father's death, she inherits and successfully expands their business and tracks down the person who conned her father, Jung-kook. Instead, of revenge, Hoo-ja offers to save his life as long as he runs for a seat in the National Assembly.

=== Supporting ===
- Tae In-ho as Han Sang-jin, a political newcomer who is the step-brother of Mi-young.
- Kim Eui-sung as Kim Joo-myung, a veteran politician who is a member of the National Assembly.
- Im Ji-hyun as Yoo Hee-jin, Jung-kook's ex-girlfriend.
- Jeon Seok-ho as Kang Hyun-tae, Sang-jin's former university colleague and current policy adviser.
- Heo Jae-ho as Choi Pil-joo, Hoo-ja's right-hand man.
- Lee Ju-myoung as Hwang Seung-yi
- Ahn Eun-jin as Park Gwi-nam
- Jung Soo-young as Myung-in
- Ji Yi-soo as Detective Na
- Kim Min-jae as Kim Nam-hwa

=== Special appearance ===
- Yeom Hye-ran as Sun-hee, Park Hoo-ja's older sister. (Ep. 11)

== Original soundtrack ==
My Fellow Citizens! OST

Soundtrack album by Various artists
- Recorded: 2019
- Genre: Soundtrack
- Languages: Korean; English
- Labels: Kakao M; Star Entry Entertainment

=== Part 1 ===
Released on April 8, 2019
| No. | Title | Lyrics | Music | Artist | Length |
|---|---|---|---|---|---|
| 1. | "Yadannatdaya" (야단났다야) | Park Jeong-eun, Defconn | Park Jeong-eun | Hyungdon and Daejun | 3:21 |
| 2. | "Yadannatdaya" (Inst.) | | Park Jeong-eun | | 3:21 |
| Total length: | | | | | 6:42 |

=== Part 2 ===
Released on April 15, 2019
| No. | Title | Lyrics | Music | Artist | Length |
|---|---|---|---|---|---|
| 1. | "Haohrio" (하오리오) | Choi Jeong-in | Choi Jeong-in | Kim Chang-wan | 2:51 |
| 2. | "Haohrio" (Inst.) | | Choi Jeong-in | | 2:51 |
| Total length: | | | | | 5:42 |

=== Part 3 ===
Released on April 22, 2019
| No. | Title | Lyrics | Music | Artist | Length |
|---|---|---|---|---|---|
| 1. | "Really Bad Guy" (오빠 나빠요) | Kim Hee-won, Jung Da-woon, Oh Seung-eun, Zeenan, Ye-eun | Kim Hee-won, Jung Da-woon, Oh Seung-eun, Zeenan | Seung-hee, Ye-eun (CLC) | 3:00 |
| 2. | "Really Bad Guy" (Inst.) | | Kim Hee-won, Jung Da-woon, Oh Seung-eun, Zeenan | | 3:00 |
| Total length: | | | | | 6:00 |

=== Part 4 ===
Released on April 29, 2019
| No. | Title | Lyrics | Music | Artist | Length |
|---|---|---|---|---|---|
| 1. | "Let Me In" | Kim Beom-joo, Kim Shi-hyuk | Kim Beom-joo, Kim Shi-hyuk | NeighBro | 4:03 |
| 2. | "Let Me In" (Inst.) | | Kim Beom-joo, Kim Shi-hyuk | | 4:03 |
| Total length: | | | | | 8:06 |

=== Part 5 ===
Released on May 5, 2019
| No. | Title | Lyrics | Music | Artist | Length |
|---|---|---|---|---|---|
| 1. | "Catch Me If You Can" (올 테면 와라) | Jay Lee, Yoo Song-yeon | Jay Lee, Yoo Song-yeon | Ulala Session | 3:31 |
| 2. | "Catch Me If You Can" (Inst.) | | Jay Lee, Yoo Song-yeon | | 3:31 |
| Total length: | | | | | 7:02 |

=== Part 6 ===
Released on May 13, 2019
| No. | Title | Lyrics | Music | Artist | Length |
|---|---|---|---|---|---|
| 1. | "Boom Boom" | Glody, Kim Shi-hyuk | Glody, Vulcan4 | Kim Tae-hyun (DickPunks) | 3:00 |
| 2. | "Boom Boom" (Inst.) | | Glody, Vulcan4 | | 3:00 |
| Total length: | | | | | 6:00 |

== Ratings ==
| Ep. | Broadcast date | Average audience share | | |
| Ep. | Broadcast date | Nielsen Korea | | TNmS |
| Ep. | Broadcast date | Nationwide | Seoul | Nationwide |
|---|---|---|---|---|
| 1 | April 1, 2019 | 6.8% | 6.3% | 6.7% |
| 2 | April 1, 2019 | 7.5% | 6.9% | 7.1% |
| 3 | April 2, 2019 | 7.0% | 7.2% | 6.2% |
| 4 | April 2, 2019 | 8.4% | 9.0% | 7.4% |
| 5 | April 8, 2019 | 5.4% | 5.2% | 4.8% |
| 6 | April 8, 2019 | 6.5% | 6.1% | 5.9% |
| 7 | April 9, 2019 | 6.9% | 7.3% | 5.7% |
| 8 | April 9, 2019 | 7.9% | 8.3% | 6.3% |
| 9 | April 15, 2019 | 5.3% | 5.5% | 4.4% |
| 10 | April 15, 2019 | 6.0% | 5.9% | 5.3% |
| 11 | April 16, 2019 | 5.4% | N/A | |
| 12 | April 16, 2019 | 6.5% | 6.3% | 6.1% |
| 13 | April 22, 2019 | 4.3% | N/A | N/A |
| 14 | April 22, 2019 | 5.4% | N/A | 5.2% |
| 15 | April 23, 2019 | 5.0% | N/A | N/A |
| 16 | April 23, 2019 | 6.9% | N/A | N/A |
| 17 | April 29, 2019 | 4.9% | N/A | N/A |
| 18 | April 29, 2019 | 6.6% | 6.9% | N/A |
| 19 | April 30, 2019 | 5.8% | 5.9% | N/A |
| 20 | April 30, 2019 | 7.0% | 7.2% | N/A |
| 21 | May 6, 2019 | 4.5% | N/A | N/A |
| 22 | May 6, 2019 | 6.2% | 6.3% | N/A |
| 23 | May 7, 2019 | 6.1% | 6.3% | 5.4% |
| 24 | May 7, 2019 | 7.0% | 6.6% | N/A |
| 25 | May 13, 2019 | 5.1% | N/A | 4.4% |
| 26 | May 13, 2019 | 5.7% | 5.8% | 5.0% |
| 27 | May 14, 2019 | 5.4% | 5.5% | 5.4% |
| 28 | May 14, 2019 | 6.4% | 6.5% | 5.9% |
| 29 | May 20, 2019 | 5.0% | N/A | N/A |
| 30 | May 20, 2019 | 6.0% | 6.1% | 5.8% |
| 31 | May 21, 2019 | 6.5% | 6.8% | 5.9% |
| 32 | May 21, 2019 | 7.5% | 7.7% | 6.4% |
| 33 | May 27, 2019 | 4.6% | N/A | N/A |
| 34 | May 27, 2019 | 5.9% | 6.1% | N/A |
| 35 | May 28, 2019 | 6.3% | 6.5% | 5.5% |
| 36 | May 28, 2019 | 8.0% | 8.1% | 6.7% |
| Average | | 6.2% | — (Note: Due to some unpublished ratings, the exact average rating is unknown.) | — |
In the table above, the blue numbers represent the lowest ratings and the red numbers represent the highest ratings.; N/A denotes that the rating is not known.

== Awards and nominations ==
| Year | Award | Category | Recipient | Result |
|---|---|---|---|---|
| 2019 | 12th Korea Drama Awards | Top Excellence Award, Actress | Kim Min-jung | Won |
| 2019 | 12th Korea Drama Awards | Excellence Award, Actress | Lee Yoo-young | Nominated |
| 2019 | KBS Drama Awards | Excellence Award, Actor in a Mid-length Drama | Choi Si-won | Won |
| 2019 | KBS Drama Awards | Excellence Award, Actress in a Mid-length Drama | Lee Yoo-young | Nominated |
| 2019 | KBS Drama Awards | Best New Actress | Lee Yoo-young | Nominated |
| 2019 | KBS Drama Awards | Netizen Award, Actor | Choi Si-won | Nominated |
| 2019 | KBS Drama Awards | Netizen Award, Actress | Lee Yoo-young | Nominated |
| 2019 | KBS Drama Awards | Netizen Award, Actress | Kim Min-jung | Nominated |
| 2019 | KBS Drama Awards | Best Couple Award | Choi Si-won and Lee Yoo-young | Nominated |

== American adaptation ==
In March 2022, ABC ordered the pilot of an American adaptation of the series titled The Company You Keep, starring Milo Ventimiglia. It is being written and executive produced by Julia Cohen for 20th Television. In April and May 2022, Catherine Haena Kim and William Fichtner joined the cast in the pilot, respectively. Also in May, Sarah Wayne Callies, James Saito, Tim Chiou, Freda Foh Shen and Felisha Terrell were added to the cast. In August 2022, ABC picked up the series. It premiered on February 19, 2023.
