= Lindsay Hartley =

American actress

Lindsay Korman
- Born: Palm Springs, California, U.S.
- Occupations: Actress, singer
- Years active: 1996–present
- Known for: Theresa Lopez-Fitzgerald on Passions; Cara Castillo on All My Children; Arianna Hernandez on Days of Our Lives
- Spouse: Justin Hartley (m. 2004; div. 2012)
- Children: 1

Lindsay Korman is an American actress. She first came to attention with three long-running soap opera roles: Theresa Lopez-Fitzgerald on Passions, Cara Castillo on All My Children, and Arianna Hernandez on Days of Our Lives. Since leaving soap operas, Korman has appeared in a number of made for television films on the Lifetime network.

== Early life ==
Born in Palm Springs, California, Korman is of Jewish, Greek, and Italian origin. Korman was a national pre-teen talent winner of the Young Miss America Beauty Pageant. Singing since age 11, Korman won a role in the Broadway production of Grease at age 18.

== Career ==
In 1999, Korman won the role of Theresa Lopez-Fitzgerald on the NBC soap opera Passions, for which she was nominated for the Soap Opera Digest Award for Outstanding Female Newcomer in 2000. She also made guest appearances on The Weakest Link and The Other Half in 2002.

On April 9, 2009, Hartley made a guest appearance on CSI: Crime Scene Investigation. In late July of that year, Soap Opera Digest announced that she would join the cast of Days of Our Lives, another NBC soap opera, in the recast role of Arianna Hernandez. The role placed her opposite former Passions co-stars Galen Gering and Eric Martsolf, who would once again portray her brother and love interest, respectively. Hartley was written off Days of Our Lives in 2010.

On September 18, 2010, it was announced that Hartley had signed on to play the new character of Cara Castillo on All My Children; she first aired on December 7. She was also cast as DC Comics character Mad Harriet during the tenth and final season of Smallville. In January 2013, it was announced that Hartley signed on to play Cara Castillo on the new All My Children being revived by Prospect Park and to begin airing sometime in April 2013.

Hartley has filled in as Sam McCall on ABC's General Hospital for Kelly Monaco on three occasions in August 2020, February 2022, and August 2024.

== Personal life ==
On May 6, 2012, Hartley filed for divorce from Justin Hartley in the Los Angeles County Superior Court citing "irreconcilable differences", asking for joint physical and legal custody of their daughter.

== Filmography ==
Year	Title	Role	Notes
1999–2008	Passions	Theresa Lopez-Fitzgerald	Role held: July 5, 1999 – August 7, 2008
2002	The Weakest Link	Herself	Game show, 1 episode
2009	CSI	Gretchen Javid	Episode: "The Descent of Man"
2009–2010	Days of Our Lives	Arianna Hernandez	Role held: August 28, 2009 – November 8, 2010
2010	Smallville	Mad Harriet	Episode: "Abandoned"
2010–2011, 2013	All My Children	Cara Castillo	Role held: December 7, 2010 – September 23, 2011, April 29, 2013 – September 2, 2013
2014	Perfect on Paper	Natalie Holland	Television film (Hallmark)
2015	The Challenger	Stephanie Burchard, James' Wife	Film
2016	Nightmare Nurse	Chloe	Television film (Lifetime)
2016	Dying to Be Loved	Jill Yates	Television film (Lifetime)
2017	It Happened One Valentine's	Vivian Cartwright	Direct-to-video film
2017	Death House	Balthoria	Film
2017	Deadly Exchange	Samantha	Television film (Lifetime); also co-writer
2017	The Wrong Nanny	Stella	Television film (Lifetime)
2017	The Student	Barbara Keyes	Television film (Lifetime)
2017	Romance at Reindeer Lodge	Karen	Television film (Hallmark)
2018	Evil Doctor	Vicky Dolan	Television film (Lifetime)
2018	Killer Twin	Kendra / Amber	Television film (Lifetime)
2019	My Mother's Split Personalities	Gail Price	Television film (Lifetime)
2020, 2022, 2024	General Hospital	Sam McCall	Temporary replacement for Kelly Monaco; August 4–13, Feb 3–7, 2022, and August 23–26, 2024

== Awards and nominations ==
List of acting awards and nominations
Year	Award	Category	Title	Result
2000	Soap Opera Digest Award	Outstanding Female Newcomer	Passions	Nominated
2002	Soap Opera Digest Award	Outstanding Younger Lead Actress	Passions	Nominated
2003	Soap Opera Digest Award	Outstanding Younger Lead Actress	Passions	Nominated
2005	Soap Opera Digest Award	Favorite Triangle	Passions	Nominated
