= Catherine Haena Kim =

American actress (born 1984)

- Born: Catherine Hae Na Kim; May 19, 1984 (age 42)
- Education: University of Virginia
- Occupations: Actress; model
- Years active: 2007–present

Catherine Haena Kim (born May 19, 1984) is an American actress and model, best known for her role as Emma Hill in the ABC television series The Company You Keep. Kim has acted in several projects, including Ballers, Good Trouble, FBI, and Boyfriends of Christmas Past.

== Early life ==
Kim was born to Korean immigrant parents. Her first experience with acting was as a fourth grader, when she performed in her elementary school's production of William Shakespeare's The Tempest.

In 2006, Kim graduated from the University of Virginia with a degree in psychology and a minor in drama. Prior to declaring a major, she planned to double major in business and French. Kim was Miss Virginia in 2006, participating in the Miss United States pageant before starting her career.

== Career ==
Kim has guest starred in several television series, including Gossip Girl, 90210, and Mistresses. She rose to fame in 2019 with the television series Ballers and FBI. In 2021, she was cast in a recurring role as Nicolette Baptiste in Good Trouble.

In 2023, Kim began starring opposite Milo Ventimiglia in the drama television series The Company You Keep, based on the South Korean television series My Fellow Citizens!.

== Filmography ==
=== Film ===
| Year | Title | Role | Notes |
|---|---|---|---|
| 2007 | Roskosmos | Cosmonaut | Short |
| 2009 | Ghosts of Girlfriends Past | Charlece | |
| 2011 | Grace | Hostess | TV Pilot |
| 2012 | Comrades | Wen | Short |
| 2013 | Male Lesbian | Spa Lady | Short |
| 2014 | A Voodoo Possession | Peanut | |
| 2014 | Simon Says | Assistant | Short |
| 2014 | Inherent Vice | News Reporter | |
| 2014 | The Last Song | The Daughter | Short |
| 2015 | Win, Lose or Love | Margaret Dell | TV movie |
| 2016 | Open House on Beverly | Jessica | Short |
| 2017 | Joy Joy Nails | Claire | Short |
| 2017 | Good Face | Michelle | Short |
| 2017 | Hidden Agenda | Catherine Hope (Voice) | Video game |
| 2017 | Lessons in Breaking up | Dani | |
| 2020 | aTypical Wednesday | Kim | Uncredited |
| 2020 | Under My Skin | Belle | |
| 2021 | A Hard Problem | Olivia | |
| 2021 | Boyfriends of Christmas Past | Lauren Kim | TV movie |
| 2021 | A Christmas Family Reunion | Kayleigh Chang | TV movie |
| 2025 | Tron: Ares | Tess Kim | Voice |

=== TV ===
| Year | Title | Role | Notes |
|---|---|---|---|
| 2007 | The Guiding Light | Fan #1 | Episode 15084 |
| 2008 | Gossip Girl | Second girl with Dan | Episode: "Summer Kind of Wonderful" |
| 2012 | 90210 | Amanda Dean | Episode: "Babes in Toyland" |
| 2012 | Lazy Me | The Ex | |
| 2012 | Sullivan & Son | Grace Kim | Episode: "The Fifth Musketeer" |
| 2014 | Mistresses | Anna Choi | Recurring role (season 2) |
| 2014 | The Millers | Mara | Episode: "Give Metta World Peace a Chance" |
| 2015 | Hawaii Five-0 | Nani Kalakaua | 2 episodes |
| 2015 | Stitchers | Mia Nichols | Episode: "Future Tense" |
| 2016 | Shooter | Claire Hopkins | Episode: "Danger Close" |
| 2017 | Major Crimes | Cora Wang | 2 episodes |
| 2018 | 9-1-1 | Darlene | Episode: "Stuck" |
| 2018 | Magnum P.I. | Emily Layton, Tara Moss | Episode: "The Woman Who Never Died" |
| 2019 | Ballers | Kate | Recurring (season 5) |
| 2020 | FBI | Special Agent Emily Ryder | Recurring (season 2) |
| 2021–2022 | Good Trouble | Nicolette Baptiste | Recurring (season 3); Guest (season 4) |
| 2022 | Tom Swift | | Episode: "...And the Liftoff to Saturn" |
| 2023 | The Company You Keep | Emma Hill | Lead role |
| 2026 | High Potential | Heidi Choi | Episode: "Pie in the Sky" |
