= Queens (American TV series) =

2021 American musical drama television series

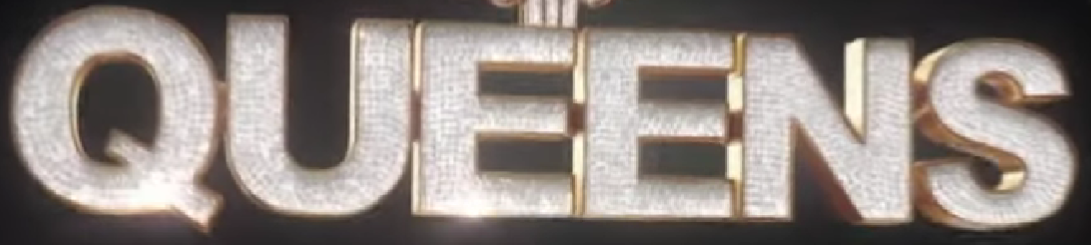
- Genre: Musical drama
- Created by: Zahir McGhee
- Starring: Eve J. Cooper; Naturi Naughton; Nadine Velazquez; Taylor Sele; Pepi Sonuga; Brandy Norwood
- Composer: Swizz Beatz
- Country of origin: United States
- Original language: English
- No. of seasons: 1
- No. of episodes: 13

Production
- Executive producers: Zahir McGhee; Sabrina Wind
- Production locations: Atlanta, Georgia; Jacksonville, Florida
- Cinematography: Sidney Sidell
- Production companies: How My Hair Look; Windpower Entertainment; ABC Signature

Original release
- Network: ABC
- Release: October 19, 2021 – February 15, 2022

Queens is an American musical drama television series that premiered on October 19, 2021, on ABC. It starred Eve, Naturi Naughton, Nadine Velazquez and Brandy Norwood. Despite receiving generally positive reviews from critics, ABC canceled the series after one season in May 2022.

== Plot ==
Brianna, Naomi, Jill and Valeria once performed as the "Nasty Bitches" in the 1990s. The four women are now in their forties, largely estranged from one another. By reuniting the four, there is now a chance to return to old fame and prestige.

=== Main ===
- Eve as Brianna "Professor Sex" Robinson
- Brandy Norwood as Naomi "Xplicit Lyrics" Harris-Jones
- Naturi Naughton as Jill "Da Thrill" Sumpter
- Nadine Velazquez as Valeria "Butter Pecan" Mendez
- Taylor Sele as Eric Jones, manager of the group
- Pepi Sonuga as Lauren "Lil Muffin" Rice

=== Recurring ===
- Precious Way as Jojo Harris, Naomi's 20-year-old daughter
- Cam'ron as a fictionalized version of himself, a rapper who was featured on one of the group's hit records and also had a previous relationship with Naomi. He re-enters Naomi's life as the ladies attempt to take over the hip-hop world again.
- Felisha Terrell as Tina Dubois, Jill's girlfriend
- RonReaco Lee as Jeff Robinson, Brianna's husband and the father of their five children. He is a doting dad, but unfaithful, with his behavior pushing Brianna towards divorce until a medical emergency compels the couple to come together despite the issues that have strained their marriage.
- Emerson Brooks as Darren Filgo, Jill's ex-husband and a deacon in their church
- Elaine del Valle as Valentina, a woman posing as Valeria's estranged mother
- Remy Ma as Zadie "Lady Z", Naomi's formal rival who is newly signed by Nasty Girl Records
- Fivio Foreign as himself, a rapper who has a one night stand with Brianna.

=== Guest ===
- Lucius Baston as DJ Kool Red, a DJ from the early 90's that introduces the young group for the first time

== Episodes ==
No.	Title	Directed by	Written by	Original release date	U.S. viewers (millions)
1	"1999"	Tim Story	Zahir McGhee	October 19, 2021	1.75
The four stars of a once popular girl group reunite for a chance to recapture their fame and regain the swagger they had in the '90s.
2	"Heart of Queens"	Tim Story	Zahir McGhee	October 26, 2021	1.48
Brianna deals with the shattering truths of her marriage; Jill decides it is time to stop living a lie and comes clean about who she really is; after a fateful meeting with Cam'ron, Naomi struggles with finally putting herself first.
3	"Who You Calling a Bitch?"	Shiri Appleby	Zahir McGhee & Heather Mitchell	November 2, 2021	1.16
After a bad review, the women come to terms with the fact that their old image and music no longer serve them; while Naomi struggles to maintain creative control, Brianna argues for a more collaborative group effort; Eric takes Valeria out to dinner.
4	"Ain't No Sunshine"	Crystle Roberson	Njeri Brown	November 9, 2021	1.34
5	"Do Anything for Clout"	Benny Boom	Jordan Reddout & Gus Hickey	November 16, 2021	1.23
6	"Behind the Throne"	Daniel Willis	Teleplay by : Zahir McGhee & Heather Mitchell; Story by : Stacy Traub	November 23, 2021	1.11
7	"Who Shot Ya"	Crystle Roberson	Tess Leibowitz	December 7, 2021	1.46
8	"God's Plan"	Stacey Muhammad	Heather Mitchell	December 14, 2021	1.14
9	"Bars"	Rachel Raimist	Mamoudou N'Diaye	January 4, 2022	1.47
10	"Nasty Girl Records"	Sidney Siddell	Kyra Jones	January 11, 2022	1.19
11	"I'm a Slave 4 U"	Menhaj Huda	Valeska Rodriguez	January 18, 2022	1.30
12	"Let the Past Be the Past"	Ruba Nadda	Njeri Brown & Jordan Reddout	February 8, 2022	1.03
13	"2022"	Crystle Roberson	Lee Johnson & Zahir McGhee	February 15, 2022	1.07

== Production ==
=== Development ===
In January 2021, ABC ordered a pilot for a musical drama titled Queens from Scandal writer and executive producer, Zahir McGhee. In March 2021, it was announced that Tim Story would direct the pilot episode. On May 14, 2021, Queens was given a series order, with an official premiere date of October 19, 2021. On May 6, 2022, ABC canceled the series after one season.

=== Casting ===
In February 2021, Eve was cast to play the role of Brianna. Later that month, Naturi Naughton landed the role of Jill. In March, it was announced that Pepi Sonuga would portray Lauren Rice. On March 8, 2021, Brandy was cast in the role as Naomi. The following day, Nadine Velazquez was cast as Valeria, and the day after that, Taylor Sele was cast as Eric Jones.

=== Music ===
On October 1, 2021, the first promo single from Queens ("Nasty Girl") was released featuring Norwood alongside the cast: Eve, Naughton and Velazquez. A music video, directed by Tim Story, was released on the same day. This was followed on October 18, 2021, by another rap song from the Queens soundtrack ("The Introduction") which was co-written by Nas. A solo song from the soundtrack ("Hear Me"), performed solely by Norwood, was also released worldwide on digital download and streaming sites on the same day. The music producer for the series is Swizz Beatz. To coincide with the second episode of the series, three new tracks were released to all digital download and streaming sites. These were "Belly of the Bitch", "Heart of Queens" (featuring rapper Cam'ron) and a cover of Miley Cyrus' "Wrecking Ball" performed by Brandy. "Girls Gonna Run That", rapped by the four leads, was released on November 1, 2021. A rap battle between Brandy and Eve was released on November 3, 2021. Another Brandy solo was released on November 8, 2021, a cover of Bill Withers' "Ain't No Sunshine". Brandy's "Until My Final Breath" was released on December 13, 2021. On January 3, 2022, "Lady Z Strikes Back (Can't Stop You)" by Brandy and Remy Ma was released.

== Release ==
In the United States, the series premiered on October 19, 2021, on ABC. In Canada, the series aired on CTV. The series is also set to premiere on Disney+ via the streaming hub Star as an original series in selected countries. In Latin America, the series will premiere as a Star+ original. In India, Disney+ Hotstar will premiere the show exclusively. Both seasons were removed from Disney+ in 2022 due to cost-cutting measures.

== Reception ==
=== Critical response ===
The review aggregator website Rotten Tomatoes reported a 100% approval rating with an average rating of 8.00/10, based on 14 critic reviews. Metacritic, which uses a weighted average, assigned a score of 75 out of 100 based on 7 critics, indicating "generally favorable reviews".

Caroline Framke for Variety praised the quartet's musical offering, calling their raps "sharp and distinct […] making clear their talent as both individuals and a swaggering collective". Liz Shannon Miller for Collider enthused the show "may become addictive viewing for longtime fans of the stars, as well as newcomers to the scene." Joel Keller for Decider felt "There's nothing revolutionary or daring about Queens, […] but, judging by the first episode, it's well-executed froth that can go in any direction McGhee and his writers feel like going in."

=== Ratings ===
Viewership and ratings per episode of Queens
No.	Title	Air date	Rating (18–49)	Viewers (millions)	DVR (18–49)	DVR viewers (millions)	Total (18–49)	Total viewers (millions)
1	"1999"	October 19, 2021	0.4	1.75	0.2	1.76	0.5	2.51
2	"Heart of Queens"	October 26, 2021	0.3	1.48	—N/a	—N/a	—N/a	—N/a
3	"Who You Calling a Bitch?"	November 2, 2021	0.3	1.16	—N/a	—N/a	—N/a	—N/a
4	"Ain't No Sunshine"	November 9, 2021	0.3	1.34	—N/a	—N/a	—N/a	—N/a
5	"They Do Anything for Clout"	November 16, 2021	0.3	1.23	0.2	0.54	0.5	1.77
6	"Behind the Throne"	November 23, 2021	0.3	1.11	0.2	0.60	0.5	1.72
7	"Who Shot Ya"	December 7, 2021	0.3	1.46	0.2	0.46	0.5	1.92
8	"God's Plan"	December 14, 2021	0.2	1.14	—N/a	—N/a	—N/a	—N/a
9	"Bars"	January 4, 2022	0.3	1.47	—N/a	—N/a	—N/a	—N/a
10	"Nasty Girl Records"	January 11, 2022	0.3	1.19	—N/a	—N/a	—N/a	—N/a
11	"I'm A Slave 4 U"	January 18, 2022	0.3	1.30	—N/a	—N/a	—N/a	—N/a
12	"Let the Past Be the Past"	February 8, 2022	0.2	1.03	—N/a	—N/a	—N/a	—N/a
13	"2022"	February 15, 2022	0.2	1.07	—N/a	—N/a	—N/a	—N/a

=== Accolades ===
The song "Nasty Girl" was nominated for Outstanding Original Song at the 2022 Black Reel Awards for Television.
