= Lou Ferrigno Jr. =

American actor (born 1984)

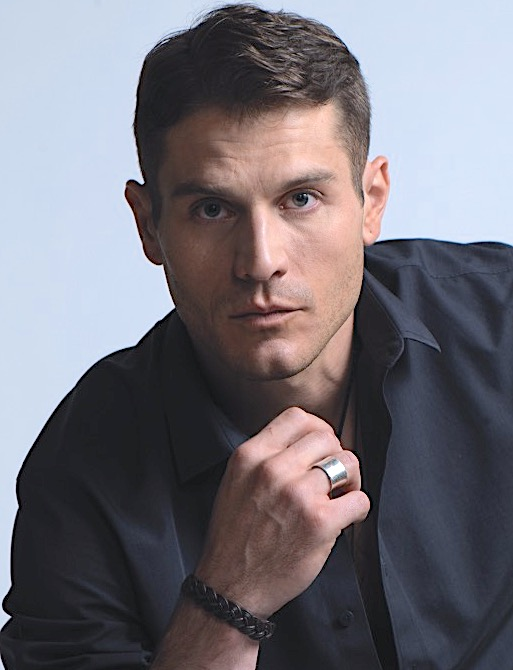
- Ferrigno in 2019
- Born: Louis Jude Ferrigno Jr. November 10, 1984 (age 42); Santa Monica, California, U.S.
- Occupations: Actor, producer, personal trainer
- Years active: 2007–present
- Parent: Lou Ferrigno (father)

Louis Jude Ferrigno Jr. (born November 10, 1984) is an American actor. He is known for his role in the CBS television series S.W.A.T., as Donovan Rocker, for his role in the ABC television series 9-1-1 as Tommy Kinard, and for his role in the HBO Max television series The Pitt as Dr. Brendon Park. He is also known for his roles on Nicky, Ricky, Dicky & Dawn, Teen Wolf, and How I Met Your Mother. His other appearances include The Rookie and Outer Banks.

== Early life ==
Ferrigno was born in Santa Monica, California, the son of the actor-bodybuilder Lou Ferrigno, and the actress Carla (Green) Ferrigno (1949-2026). His father is of Italian descent and his mother of Swedish and Irish ancestry. In high school, Ferrigno attended Loyola High School in downtown Los Angeles, eventually transferring to Notre Dame in Sherman Oaks.

Ferrigno attended college at the University of Southern California, graduating in 2007 with a B.A. in Communication from the Annenberg School for Communication and a minor in Business Law. After he suffered a career-ending knee injury as a walk-on linebacker for the 2007 Rose Bowl Champion USC Trojans, his focus immediately shifted to acting and improvisation.

== Career ==
Ferrigno made his television debut in 2013 on the long-running daytime soap Days of Our Lives. He has since landed numerous recurring roles on successful shows such as How I Met Your Mother, Agents of S.H.I.E.L.D., Teen Wolf, The Young and the Restless, Nicky, Ricky, Dicky & Dawn, Mutt & Stuff, and the series reboot of S.W.A.T. He portrayed Tommy Kinard — a gay firefighter and ex-soldier — in 9-1-1. He appeared as Hourman on the DC Universe/The CW series Stargirl, which premiered in 2020. In 2023, Ferrigno starred in a recurring role as Ryan in the third season of the Netflix series Outer Banks.

== Filmography ==
=== Film ===
Year	Title	Role	Notes
2012	1313: Hercules Unbound!	Zeus	Direct-to-video film
2012	1313: Night of the Widow	Konner	Direct-to-video film
2014	Basically	Beach Lover	Short film
2014	The Hunter Games	Big Jackson	Short film
2017	Muse	Jason Block	
2017	Urban Myths	Mr. Mandl	
2017	The Choice	Mark	Short film
2017	Anabolic Life	Officer Killian	
2018	Wrong Side of 25	Todd	Short film
2019	Nation's Fire	Paleface	
2019	The Experience	Michael	
2020	Legend of the Muse	Jason	
2020	Guest House	Kip Werner	
2021	Dreamcatcher	Colton	
2021	Final Frequency	Frank Jones	
2022	Nightshade	Ben Hays	
2022	Resisting Roots	Trent	
2022	Blackout	Jackson Jacobs	
2024	Impulse	David Gilligan	
2026	Counter Strike		Post-production

=== Television ===
Year(s)	Title	Role(s)	Notes
2013	Days of Our Lives	Drunk Guy	1 episode
2013–2014	How I Met Your Mother	Louis	3 episodes
2014	The Mindy Project	Cheesy Guy	Episode: "L.A."
2014	Off the Record	Officer Kilroy	Television film
2014	Teen Wolf	Deputy Haigh	2 episodes
2014	Agents of S.H.I.E.L.D.	Agent Hauer	Episode: "The Things We Bury"
2014	NCIS	Dave Lancellotti	Episode: "Semper Fortis"
2015	Nashville	Chad	Episode: "The Storm Has Just Begun"
2015	Earthfall	Soldier #3	Television film
2015	The Young and the Restless	Officer Kramer	5 episodes
2015	The Exes	Aaron	Episode: "Gone Girls"
2015	Scary Endings	The Werewolf	Episode: "Yummy Meat: A Halloween Carol"
2015–2018	Nicky, Ricky, Dicky & Dawn	Jett Masterson	3 episodes
2016	Bones	Drew Poppleton	Episode: "The Head in the Abutment"
2016–2017	Mutt & Stuff	Super Sammy	Voice role; 4 episodes
2016	Rush: Inspired by Battlefield	Tim McNulty	Main cast
2017	Happily Never After	Mark	Television film
2017	NCIS: Los Angeles	Victor Larmont	Episode: "From Havana with Love"
2017–2025	S.W.A.T.	Donovan Rocker	Recurring role; 37 episodes
2018–2019, 2024–2025	9-1-1	Tommy Kinard	Recurring role; 15 episodes
2019	A Place Called Hollywood	Josh	Main cast
2020	The Rookie	Singer	Episode: "Control"
2020–2021	Stargirl	Rex Tyler / Hourman	4 episodes
2022	Old Flames Never Die	Weston Wade	Television film
2023	Outer Banks	Ryan	8 episodes
2025	Cocaine Quarterback	Himself	Docuseries; 2 episodes
2026	The Pitt	Dr. Brendon Park	Episode: "4:00 P.M." (Season 2)
