= Cara Castillo =

- All My Children character
- Lindsay Hartley as Cara Castillo
- Portrayed by: Amanda Hall Rogers (2003); Lindsay Hartley (2010–13)
- Duration: 2003; 2010–11; 2013
- First appearance: June 9, 2003
- Last appearance: September 2, 2013
- Created by: Gordon Rayfield; Anna Theresa Cascio
- Introduced by: Jean Dadario Burke (2003); Julie Hanan Carruthers (2010); Ginger Smith (2013)
In-universe information
- Other names: Carolyn Finn
- Occupation: Physician at Pine Valley Hospital; Former Physician with Doctors Without Borders; Former Research assistant for Project Orpheus
- Mother: Leticia Castillo
- Brothers: Griffin Castillo
- Husband: Jake Martin (2003–08); Tad Martin (2011)
- Sons: Oliver Castillo

Cara Castillo is a fictional character from the original ABC and The Online Network soap opera, All My Children. Amanda Hall Rogers portrayed the character for two episodes on June 9 and June 10, 2003, before being written off. The character was reintroduced, portrayed by actress Lindsay Hartley on December 9, 2010, until the series finale on September 23, 2011. In December 2012, it was announced that Hartley would reprise the role for the impending online reboot on April 29, 2013.

== Casting ==
Lindsay Hartley is a veteran of daytime having been a cast member of the NBC and DirecTV soap opera Passions for its entire run from 1999 to 2008. Following a short break from the genre, Hartley was cast on NBC's long-running soap Days of Our Lives as former undercover agent Arianna Hernandez from 2009 to 2010 before being let go. However, a month later she began appearing on All My Children as Cara Castillo, a doctor who shared a past with Dr. Jake Martin (Ricky Paull Goldin). Following her exit from Days, Hartley's manager contacted AMC, as well as other soaps based in the Los Angeles area, when the show's executive producer Julie Hanan Carruthers and casting director Judy Wilson asked to meet with the actress to cast her in a new role.

In a November 3, 2010, interview with TV Guide reporter Michael Logan, Hartley discussed the development of her character.

"I love this character. She's not a girl. I feel like she's the first truly mature woman I've had a chance to play. You find out [Cara and Jake] fell in love while working in Africa with Doctors Without Borders and they got married but something went down and Cara took off with another man. At least that's what Jake believes happened, and that's what the audience will believe. Then there's the truth, which will slowly unravel."

—Hartley, TV Guide

== Storylines ==
=== 2003 ===
Carolyn Finn first comes to town in 2003 with her fiancé Jake Martin to meet his family and announce their engagement. The two of them met each other while working with Doctors Without Borders. They eventually marry and leave for Africa to serve with Doctors Without Borders. When Jake comes back to Pine Valley in 2008, he reveals that Carolyn has left him for a truck driver and that they're no longer together.

=== 2010–11 ===
In November 2010, Jake received an e-mail for a job offer with Doctors Without Borders. When his brother, Tad, comes up, he reveals that he got the offer from "Cara" − as in Carolyn. Jake tells Tad that this is the first time he's heard from Cara since she left him, and it's clear he's still hurt by what he saw as a betrayal. A few days later, Griffin Castillo shows up in town. Jake takes one look at him, and punches him. Later, he reveals to Tad that Griffin was the man he saw Cara drive off with. Griffin claims that he hasn't heard from Cara since then, but later, it's clear the two are still close. Cara soon shows up in Pine Valley, and makes her way to Krystal's to meet Griffin. While there, she sees Amanda Martin walk in and while she's chatting with owner Krystal Carey, Cara realizes that Amanda is Jake's wife and the mother of his son. It became obvious that Cara's return meant that Amanda needed to fight for her marriage.

Cara later goes to the hospital to try to convince Jake again to return to Doctors Without Borders, and that's where Tad comes in and reveals that Griffin is not Cara's lover but that he's her brother. Cara's last name is actually Castillo, not Finn. Cara tells Jake that she wanted out of the marriage, so she asked Griffin to help stage a situation so that Jake would leave her completely. When she later tells Griffin about this, she tells him she lied to Jake about why she left. Cara finds out that she can't leave the country due to a problem with her immigration papers. Cara decides to get a job at Pine Valley Hospital when she finds out they are short-staffed and after Jake says he doesn't have a problem working with her. Though Cara insists that she no longer has feelings for Jake, she is revealed to have kept their wedding rings.

In mid-January, it is revealed that Cara had leukemia as a child, at the age of 8. She revealed this to Jake after she got too emotionally involved with a child patient at the hospital and confronted the parents about how they were treating their daughter. In February, it is revealed that, while working with DWB, Cara chose to help a little boy who was caught in a crossfire between a group of drug dealers over the brother of a drug cartel leader and let him die. This experience has come back to haunt her: the drug dealer's associates are planning to kill her as soon as she leaves the United States. With this, Jake, Tad, Griffin, and Cara come up with a plan to fake her death. However, Amanda, then unaware of Cara's situation and simply wanting her out of her life, calls the Feds on Cara. At the time that they were getting ready to take her for further investigation, Tad comes in and tells them that is his fiancée and to let go of her. Griffin and Cara's mother Leticia Castillo came in to be there for Cara and Tad's wedding, but really there was another reason for her being there: to convince Cara that this is not the best for her. Leticia takes it upon herself to discuss the situation her daughter has with the Martin brothers. She goes through with the wedding with the Feds watching over them. They decided that they needed to put as much effort into it as possible. She and Tad married on March 9, 2011, with friends and family by their sides. On August 10, 2011, Cara meets Tad's ex-wife and Kathy's mother Dixie Cooney Martin.

Tad explains to Cara that he is still in love with Dixie and she soon begins a relationship with David Hayward. Cara and David's tryst resulted in her pregnancy. When Cara told David she was pregnant he was thrilled and wanted the baby with Cara and to be by her side personally and in his medical practice, practicing medicine together as a team.

=== 2013 ===
Cara is still working at the hospital in Pine Valley. It was revealed that David Hayward was sent to prison for putting JR Chandler into a coma. Cara reveals that while David was in prison, she wrote him a letter that she had a miscarriage and lost the baby. David constantly sent her letters as well, but Cara burned all of them wanting to erase David from her life. It is revealed that Cara had possibly lied about what actually happened to the baby and gotten an abortion and lied about having a miscarriage. JR tells Cara that he could hear what she was saying even though in coma. He knows that her and David's child is alive. It's later revealed that David and Cara's child was a boy and is safely living with her mother in Puerto Rico. JR surprises Cara by having her mother and her son travel from Puerto Rico to live at the Chandler mansion. JR tells Cara that he will hire Leticia as their new cook, while Oliver is her grandson and their true identities will not be revealed.

== Reception ==
When the subject of Cara not being a documented resident of the United States arose, the plot device coincided with the real-life issue of U.S. immigration laws. Cara, being a legal resident of Mexico, came to the U.S. to reconcile with her husband Jake and win back his love, but Jake's jealous wife Amanda notified officials to get Cara deported. Following questions on Cara's future, she entered a green-card marriage with Jake's brother Tad and married him to remain a resident in the U.S.

The subject immediately caused debates among viewers of the show, especially on the show's promptness on allowing Cara to remain in the country with little question from officials. In an article on Fox News Latino, the subject was emphasized with real viewers opinions that were written on online discussion boards.

"It’s not that easy,” wrote a poster on an AOL board about cross-country marriage. “My brother married a woman from Peru and it took two years to get her to the U.S.” Another started a long post with, “The writers probably don’t want to get into this but …" and went on to bemoan the lack of paths to citizenship for undocumented immigrants brought to the United States as children."

—Fox News Latino

The story also mirrored a similar one that occurred on General Hospital, which saw Siobhan McKenna, a legal resident of Ireland living in the U.S. while undocumented, proposed to by her boyfriend Lucky Spencer so that she could remain in the country and not face deportation. The article also discussed that it was with little effort for Cara to get a job at the town's hospital even though she was not legally enabled to work without a proper visa. While Cara was able to remain in the country and eventually receive her sufficient residency documents, the character's story used real-world situations to educate viewers on a subject that has occurred in millions of families living in the country and its effect on a person's eligibility to become a legal citizen.
