= The Company You Keep (TV series) =

2023 American drama television series

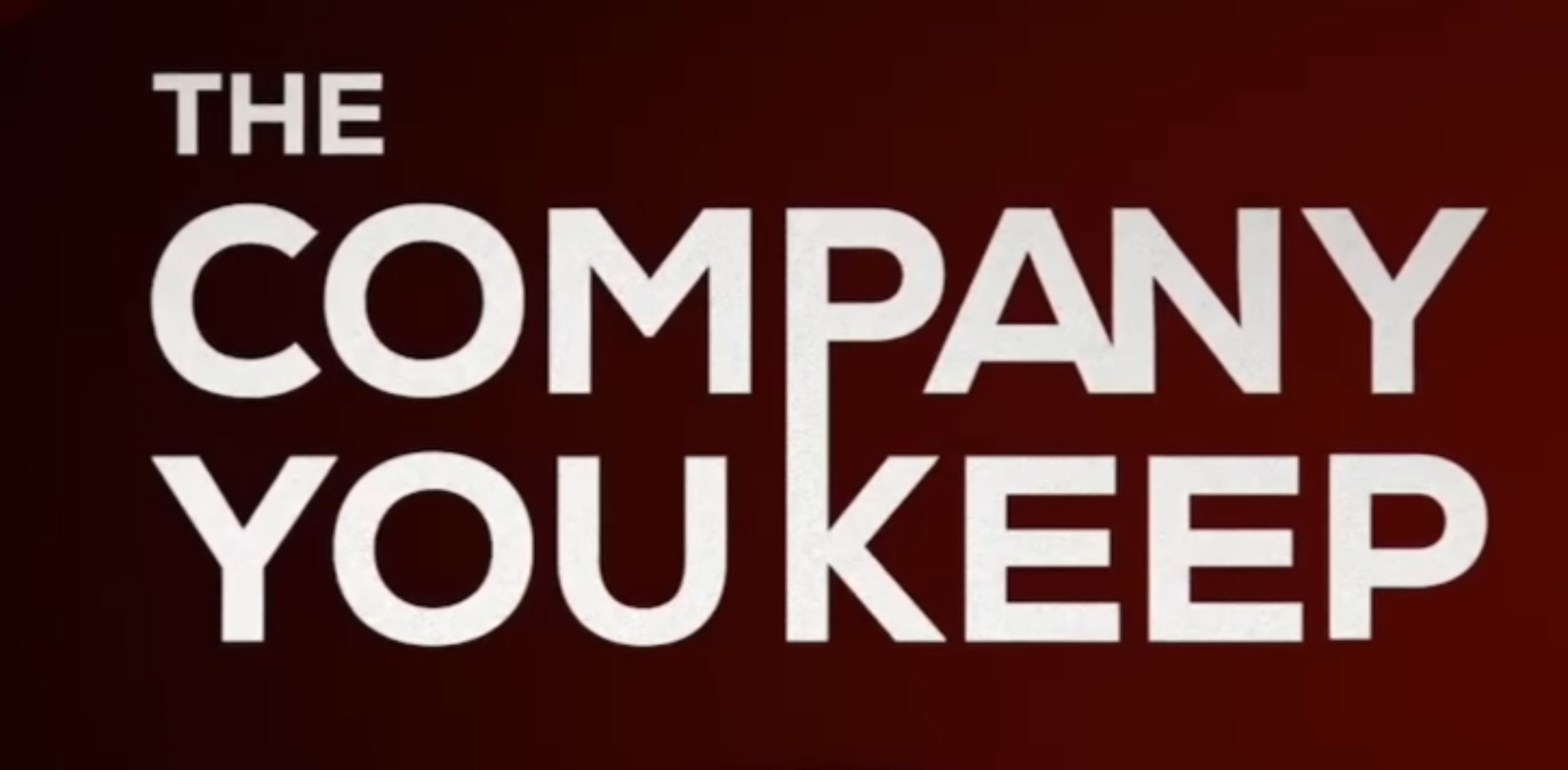
- Genre: Drama
- Created by: Julia Cohen
- Based on: My Fellow Citizens!
- Starring: Milo Ventimiglia; Catherine Haena Kim; Sarah Wayne Callies; Polly Draper; Tim Chiou; James Saito; Freda Foh Shen; Felisha Terrell; William Fichtner
- Composers: Jeff Garber; Siddhartha Khosla
- Country of origin: United States
- Original language: English
- No. of seasons: 1
- No. of episodes: 10

Production
- Executive producers: Milo Ventimiglia; Russ Cundiff; Todd Harthan; Jon M. Chu; Caitlin Foito; Ben Younger; Lindsay Goffman; Julia Cohen; Phil Klemmer
- Producers: Michael Gray; Deanna Harris; Nick Pavonetti
- Cinematography: Yasu Tanida; JP Wakayama
- Editors: Jason Cherella; Tom Runquist; Talia Lidia; Erin Wyatt; Lai-San Ho
- Running time: 42–43 minutes
- Production companies: DiVide Pictures; Electric Somewhere; Gratitude Productions; 20th Television

Original release
- Network: ABC
- Release: February 19 – May 7, 2023

The Company You Keep is an American drama television series created by Julia Cohen that aired from February 19 until May 7, 2023, on ABC. The series is based on the South Korean television series My Fellow Citizens!, and stars Milo Ventimiglia and Catherine Haena Kim. In May 2023, the series was canceled. The series was removed from Hulu on July 1, 2023.

== Synopsis ==
The Company You Keep tells the story of con man Charlie, who is in debt to crime boss Daphne Finch alongside his family. With undercover CIA officer Emma attempting to track Daphne down, a night of passion ignites love between Charlie and Emma, who are on a collision course professionally.

== Cast and characters ==
=== Main ===
- Milo Ventimiglia as Charlie Nicoletti, a masterful high-stakes con man from an Italian American crime family
- Catherine Haena Kim as Emma Hill, an undercover CIA officer from an Asian American political dynasty. Her father is Korean American and her mother is Chinese American.
- Sarah Wayne Callies as Birdie Nicoletti, Charlie's bossy big sister and Ollie’s mother, who is a con woman and co-owner of the bar they run together
- Polly Draper as Fran Nicoletti, a con woman, Leo's wife, and Charlie and Birdie's mother
- William Fichtner as Leo Nicoletti, a steelworker turned con man, Fran's husband, and Charlie and Birdie's father. He is struggling with early onset memory loss.
- Tim Chiou as David Hill, an incumbent Senator currently running for re-election, the son of Joseph, and the brother of Emma
- James Saito as Joseph Hill, the patriarch of a political dynasty considered to be the Asian American Kennedys
- Freda Foh Shen as Grace Hill, Joseph's wife and Emma and David's mother
- Felisha Terrell as Daphne Finch, an enigmatic consultant to Irish mobster Patrick Maguire

=== Special guest stars ===
- Luke Kirby as Jones Malone
- Miguel Gomez as Priest
- Tony Shalhoub as Frankie Musso, Fran's ex-fiancé

=== Recurring ===
- Shaylee Mansfield as Ollie Nicoletti, Birdie's daughter with Simon
- Courtney Taylor as Mason, Emma's colleague at the CIA
- Timothy V. Murphy as Patrick Mcguire, an Irish mobster who works with Daphne
- Sachin Bhatt as Agent Vikram Singh, an FBI agent
- Barry Sloane as Connor Mcguire, Patrick's son involved with the mob
- Andrea Cortes as Junnifer West, a staffer who David starts a relationship with
- Geoff Stults (Note: Geoff Stults is credited as "Special Guest Star" but is a recurring cast member.) as Simon Norris, Birdie's ex and Ollie's absent father who comes from a wealthy East Coast family and is a recovering addict
- Michael Gladis as Brad Willford, a gun broker

In addition, David Douglas co-stars as Doug Daniels, David's campaign manager.

== Episodes ==
| No. | Title | Directed by | Written by | Original release date | Prod. code | U.S. viewers (millions) |
|---|---|---|---|---|---|---|
| 1 | "Pilot" | Ben Younger | Julia Cohen | February 19, 2023 | 1STW01 | 2.37 |
Charlie Nicoletti is a con artist from a crime family that owns a Baltimore bar as a front; they score $10 million on a job. While celebrating their presumed retirement from crime, Charlie's fiancée secretly absconds with their profits. Emma Hill is an undercover CIA agent. Her partner, Kevin, has been having an affair right under her nose. Charlie and Emma meet at the bar of a luxury hotel and bond immediately. They flirtatiously banter and play coy about what each does for a living, then proceed to have a weekend of passion and intimacy. A besotted Charlie goes AWOL from his family business, although he sets up a new job marking a high-rolling mega-pastor. At an important gala, where the pastor as well as Emma's prominent family are present, Charlie attempts to break things off by lying to Emma, leaving her heartbroken. When the FBI begins investigating the $10 million job, Emma catches a glimpse of a familiar-looking man in the footage. The family tricks the pastor into handing over a large sum of money he had been laundering. Charlie apologizes to Emma and tells her the reasons he is falling for her, beginning their relationship. Later, at the family bar, the drug syndicate from the unsuccessful con job appear and want their $10 million back in blood.
| 2 | "A Sparkling Reputation" | Kevin Mock | Julia Cohen & Phil Klemmer | February 26, 2023 | 1STW02 | 2.42 |
In order to start repaying the syndicate, The Nicolettis attempt to steal a prized necklace at an auction. Emma and Charlie go on a proper date, although their conversation is awkward. Emma's brother David is running for Senate re-election and calls for all hands-on deck. Emma has no interest in participating but sees his campaign's key vulnerabilities, resulting in her being offered a position. Emma and Charlie continue seeing each other but she coldly tells him not to get too attached just as Charlie did to her in the previous episode, though she later tells him it was because she was scared of how well he knows her. While investigating Daphne's hotel room their worlds almost collide. The Nicolettis find a way to steal the necklace from its socialite owner by posing as fashion photographers, but they're almost caught by her security; they soon realize the jewel is actually a stolen artifact and they extort her husband for $500,000 while forcing him to return the jewel. Emma has no choice but to tell her brother the truth about her job. Charlie deduces that Daphne, who is African American, may actually be Maguire's biological daughter. Because Charlie accidentally moved an item in Daphne's hotel, it inadvertently leads her to find out Emma bugged it.
| 3 | "Against All Odds" | David Straiton | Morgan Faust & Johnny Richardson | March 5, 2023 | 1STW03 | 2.24 |
| 4 | "All In" | Chi-Yoon Chung | Cori Uchida & Adam Lash | March 19, 2023 | 1STW04 | 2.13 |
| 5 | "The Spy Who Loved Me" | Jon Huertas | Matthew Maala & D. M. Harring | March 26, 2023 | 1STW05 | 2.17 |
| 6 | "The Real Thing" | Anna Mastro | Johnny Richardson & Emily Cheever | April 2, 2023 | 1STW06 | 2.18 |
| 7 | "Company Man" | James Takata | Morgan Faust & J. D. Shields | April 9, 2023 | 1STW07 | 2.12 |
| 8 | "The Art of the Steel" | Anna Mastro | Phil Klemmer & Matthew Maala | April 16, 2023 | 1STW08 | 2.34 |
| 9 | "The Truth Shall Set You Free" | Andi Armaganian | Cori Uchida & Adam Lash | April 30, 2023 | 1STW09 | 2.21 |
| 10 | "The Truth Hurts" | Jon Huertas | Julia Cohen & Johnny Richardson | May 7, 2023 | 1STW10 | 2.06 |

== Production ==
=== Development ===
On March 4, 2022, ABC ordered a pilot for the series with Milo Ventimiglia in the lead. On May 6, 2022, Ben Younger was tapped to direct and executive produce the pilot penned by Julia Cohen. The Company You Keep was ordered to series on August 22, 2022. On May 12, 2023, ABC canceled the series after one season.

=== Casting ===
Milo Ventimiglia joined the pilot in the leading role of Charlie and as executive producer on March 4, 2022. On April 27, 2022, Catherine Haena Kim was cast as Emma in the pilot alongside Milo Ventimiglia. William Fichtner was cast in the pilot as Leo on May 2, 2022. On May 20, 2022, Sarah Wayne Callies, James Saito, Tim Chiou, Freda Foh Shen, and Felisha Terrell joined the pilot as leads. Polly Draper was revealed to be amongst the cast when the series was ordered. On February 2, 2023, Sachin Bhatt joined the cast in a recurring role. On March 17, 2023, Geoff Stults was cast in a recurring capacity.

=== Filming ===
Principal photography for the pilot began on April 30, 2022, in Los Angeles, California.

== Broadcast ==
The Company You Keep premiered on February 19, 2023 and ended on May 7, 2023 on ABC. The series was removed from Hulu on July 1, 2023.

== Reception ==
=== Critical response ===
The review aggregator website Rotten Tomatoes reported an 84% approval rating with an average rating of 6.5/10, based on 19 critic reviews. The website's critics consensus reads, "The Company You Keep gets off to a rocky start in the first few episodes, but the show's appealing cast and entertaining blend of crime and romance will pay off for patient viewers." Metacritic, which uses a weighted average, assigned a score of 67 out of 100 based on 13 critics, indicating "generally favorable reviews".

=== Ratings ===
Viewership and ratings per episode of The Company You Keep
| No. | Title | Air date | Rating (18–49) | Viewers (millions) |
|---|---|---|---|---|
| 1 | "Pilot" | February 19, 2023 | 0.3 | 2.37 |
| 2 | "A Sparkling Reputation" | February 26, 2023 | 0.3 | 2.42 |
| 3 | "Against All Odds" | March 5, 2023 | 0.2 | 2.24 |
| 4 | "All In" | March 19, 2023 | 0.3 | 2.13 |
| 5 | "The Spy Who Loved Me" | March 26, 2023 | 0.3 | 2.17 |
| 6 | "The Real Thing" | April 2, 2023 | 0.2 | 2.18 |
| 7 | "Company Man" | April 9, 2023 | 0.2 | 2.12 |
| 8 | "The Art of the Steel" | April 16, 2023 | 0.2 | 2.34 |
| 9 | "The Truth Shall Set You Free" | April 30, 2023 | 0.3 | 2.21 |
| 10 | "The Truth Hurts" | May 7, 2023 | 0.3 | 2.06 |
