= Pepi Sonuga =

Nigerian actress

- Born: Stephanie Sonuga; September 8, 1993 (age 32); Lagos, Lagos State, Nigeria
- Education: Culver City High School
- Occupation: Actress
- Years active: 2008–present

Pepi Sonuga// (born Stephanie Sonuga, September 8, 1993), is a Nigerian actress. She is best known for roles as Lacey Emery in the Starz horror-comedy series Ash vs Evil Dead (2016) and Tangey Turner in the Freeform drama series Famous in Love (2017–2018).

== Life and career ==
Sonuga was born to a Yoruba father and an Igbo mother in Lagos, Nigeria and moved to Los Angeles, California at age 10. On the transition, Sonuga said, "It was hard to adjust. I didn’t really know much about America, and I obviously had a very thick accent. I found it hard as far as being bullied." At age 15, Sonuga contested and was named Miss Teen Los Angeles. She also began modeling for brands such as Forever 21, Hot Topic, and Skechers. She attended Culver City High School in Culver City, California.

== Filmography ==
=== Film ===
Year	Title	Role	Notes
2009	Weigh Money	Lena	Short
2013	Life of a King	Michelle	
2018	Under the Silver Lake	Emerald Beauty	
2018	Thriller	Kim Morris	
2018	Leprechaun Returns	Katie	
2024	The Six Triple Eight	Elaine White	

=== Television ===
Year	Title	Role	Notes
2013	General Hospital	Taylor DuBois	Regular Cast
2015	Mortal Kombat X: Generations	Jacqui Briggs	Episode: "Mission Fatigue"
2016	The Fosters	Sally Benton	Recurring Cast: Season 3
2016	Lab Rats: Elite Force	Crossbow	Episode: "The List"
2016	Filthy Preppy Teen$	Kadelyn	Recurring Cast
2016	Ash vs Evil Dead	Lacey Emery	Recurring Cast: Season 2
2017–2018	Famous in Love	Tangey Turner	Main Cast
2019	Welcome to Daisyland	Daisy	Main Cast
2019	Oh Jerome, No	Hope	Episode: "Total Phony"
2019	Cake	Hope	Episode: "Inside Out"
2019, 2024	9-1-1	Young Athena Carter	Episode: "Athena Begins" and “When the Boeing Gets Tough…”
2020	Into the Dark	Misty Carpenter	Episode: "Crawlers"
2021–2022	Queens	Lauren "Lil Muffin" Rice	Main Cast
2022	Pam & Tommy	Melanie	Recurring Cast
2023	Walker	Lana Jones	Recurring Cast: Season 3

== See also ==
- List of General Hospital characters
- List of The Fosters characters
- Children of General Hospital
- Evil Dead
- List of 9-1-1 characters
