= List of 9-1-1 characters =

9-1-1 is an American television series that originally began broadcasting on January 3, 2018, on Fox.

== Overview ==
Character	Portrayed by	Seasons									
Character	Portrayed by	1	2	3	4	5	6	7	8	9	10
Athena Grant	Angela Bassett	Main	Main	Main	Main	Main	Main	Main	Main	Main	Main
Robert "Bobby" Nash	Peter Krause	Main	Main	Main	Main	Main	Main	Main	Main		
Evan "Buck" Buckley	Oliver Stark	Main	Main	Main	Main	Main	Main	Main	Main	Main	Main
Henrietta "Hen" Wilson	Aisha Hinds	Main	Main	Main	Main	Main	Main	Main	Main	Main	Main
Howard "Chimney" Han	Kenneth Choi	Main	Main	Main	Main	Main	Main	Main	Main	Main	Main
Michael Grant	Rockmond Dunbar	Main (Note: Dunbar is credited as a series regular from 1.01 to 5.09.)	Main	Main	Main	Main					
Abigail "Abby" Clark	Connie Britton	Main		Special Guest							
Maddie Buckley Han	Jennifer Love Hewitt		Main	Main	Main	Main	Main	Main	Main	Main	Main
Edmundo "Eddie" Diaz	Ryan Guzman		Main	Main	Main	Main	Main	Main	Main	Main	Main
May Grant	Corinne Massiah	Recurring	Main	Main	Main	Main	Main	Guest	Recurring	Main	Main
Harry Grant	Marcanthonee Jon Reis	Recurring	Main	Main	Main	Main	(Note: Reis is credited up until 6.01 but his last appearance as the character was in 5.11.)				
Harry Grant	Elijah M. Cooper							Recurring	Recurring	Main	Main
Christopher Diaz	Gavin McHugh		Recurring	Main (Note: Gavin McHugh is uncredited and does not appear in 9.01 & 9.02. In all other episodes he is credited even when absent.)	Main	Main	Main	Main	Main	Main	Main
Albert Han	John Harlan Kim			Guest	Main	Recurring	Guest				

== Main characters ==
=== Athena Grant ===
Athena Grant
- 9-1-1 character
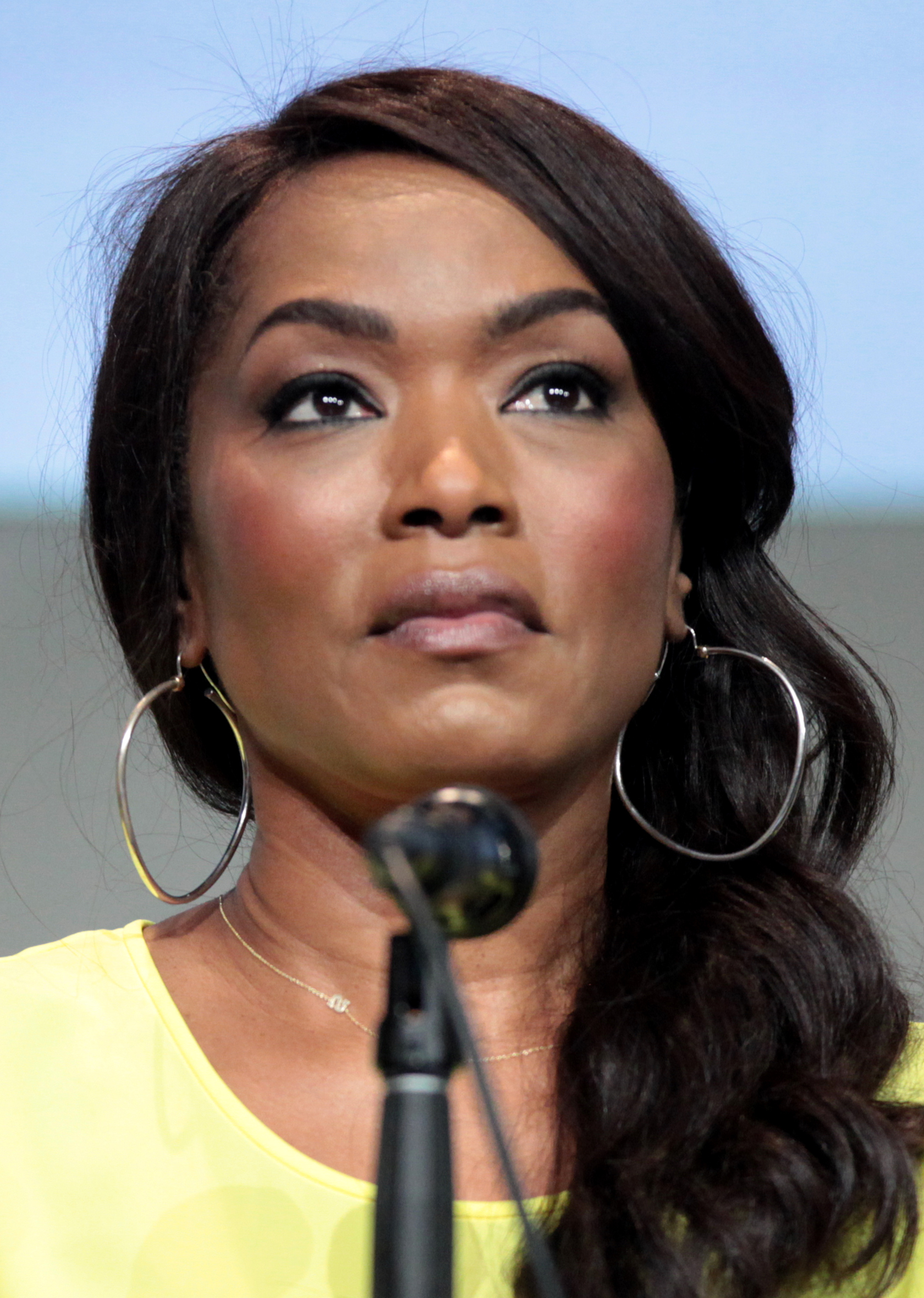
- Angela Bassett portrays Athena Grant.
- First appearance: "Pilot" (1.01)
- Created by: Ryan Murphy; Tim Minear; Brad Falchuk
- Portrayed by: Angela Bassett; Ayaamii Sledge (child); Pepi Sonuga (young adult)

In-universe information
- Full name: Athena Grant-Nash; Athena Carter (birth name)
- Occupation: Detective (Los Angeles Police Department); Field Sergeant (formerly)
- Family: Beatrice Carter (mother); Samuel Carter (father)
- Spouses: Bobby Nash (m. 2019; died 2025) Michael Grant (m. 2004; div. 2018)
- Significant other: Emmett Washington † (late fiancé) (died 1991)
- Children: May Grant (daughter); Harry Grant (son)
- Origin: Belleville, Florida, USA

Athena Grant (née Carter) (Angela Bassett) is an LAPD detective, formerly field sergeant, and mother of May and Harry from her first marriage to Michael Grant. Athena grew up in Florida, where a young girl named Tanya Kingston disappeared from her neighborhood and inspired her future career. She was originally enrolled in law school in Los Angeles, but after meeting Emmett Washington, she decided to go into the police force. She is independent in her work, preferring a one-person patrol unit to working with a partner. However, she can be impetuous and has both disobeyed rules to do her own investigation and gone into dangerous situations without back-up. Athena and Michael were married for fourteen years prior to their divorce. She began dating Bobby Nash in season two, the season then ending with their wedding. She struggles to show how her job affects her emotionally, mostly opening up to Bobby and Hen about her feelings.

At the end of season 9, Athena is caught in the crossfire of the criminal Castor family and the corrupt Detective Hooks. She is shot in the chest by Hooks and is placed into a medically induced coma, where she has visions of her former partner. Though she ultimately survives, she decides to pursue a change of pace in her career and becomes a detective.

Pepi Sonuga portrays a younger Athena during the flashback scenes of the season 3 episode "Athena Begins", and briefly reprises the role in seasons 8 and 9.

=== Evan Buckley ===
Evan Buckley
- 9-1-1 character
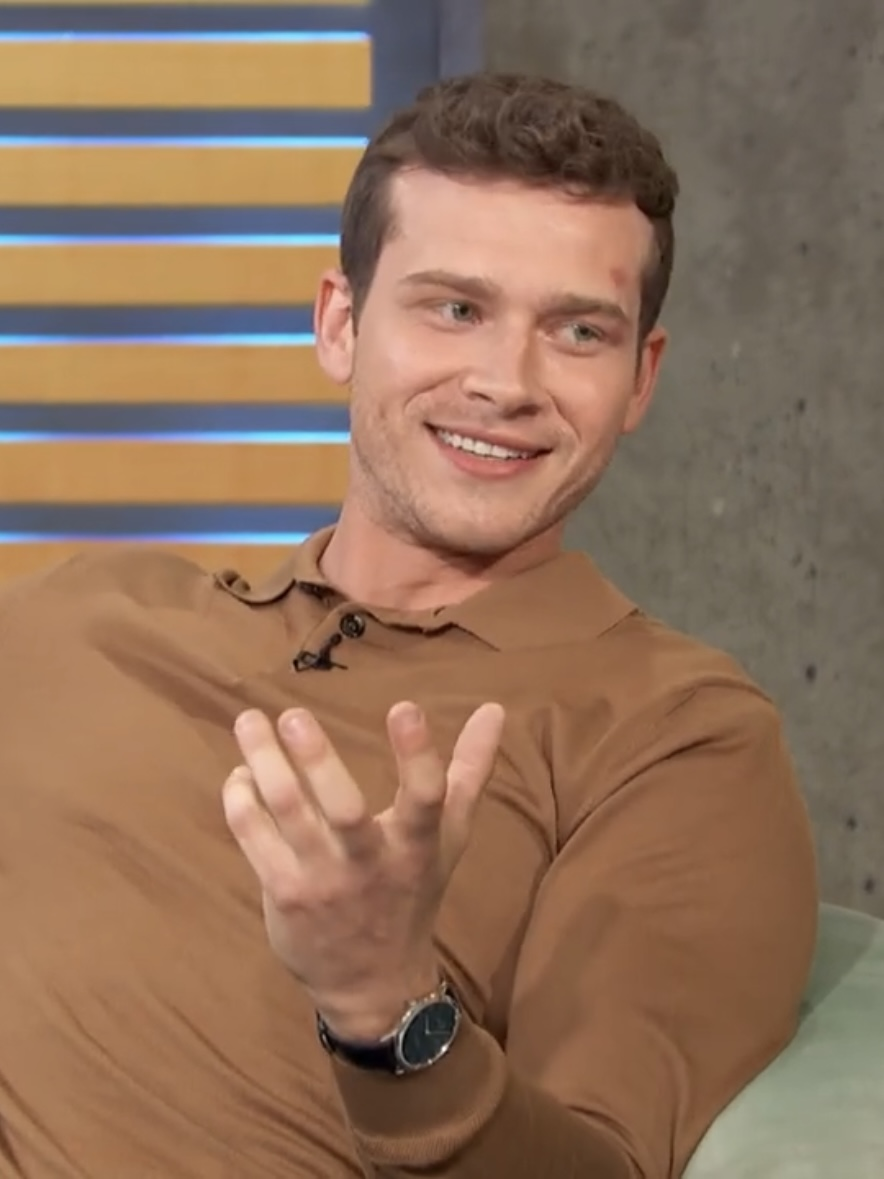
- Oliver Stark portrays Evan Buckley.
- First appearance: "Pilot" (1.01)
- Created by: Ryan Murphy; Tim Minear; Brad Falchuk
- Portrayed by: Oliver Stark; Beckett Maillard (child); Elton McCrudden (teenager)

In-universe information
- Full name: Evan Buckley
- Nickname: Buck
- Occupation: Station 118 Firefighter (Los Angeles Fire Department)
- Family: Margaret Buckley (mother); Phillip Buckley (father); Maddie Buckley (sister); Howard Han (brother-in-law); Daniel Buckley † (brother); Jee-Yun Buckley-Han (niece); Robert Nash Han (nephew)
- Significant others: Tommy Kinard (ex-boyfriend); Abigail Clark (ex-girlfriend); Ali Martin (ex-girlfriend); Taylor Kelly (ex-girlfriend); Natalia Dollenmeyer (ex-girlfriend)
- Children: Theo Riley (biological/foster son)
- Origin: Hershey, Pennsylvania, USA

Evan "Buck" Buckley (Oliver Stark) is a firefighter at Station 118 and Maddie's younger brother. He joined the LAFD after a series of jobs in various parts of the country, he gained his nickname from the fire academy when there were three other cadets named Evan. While he can be impulsive to the point of recklessness while in the field, he is dedicated to his job. He has dysfunctional and complicated relationships with his own parents, partly due to the distance they developed after the death of their first son, Daniel. Buck does not learn of Daniel's existence until season four. Buck trusts Bobby as a father figure, and he sees the 118 as his family. When Maddie comes back into his life after her abusive relationship, Buck convinced her to join 9-1-1 Emergency Dispatch. Buck was prone to reckless hookups, nearly losing his job due to this fact, but after meeting Abby he started looking for more serious relationships. After Abby's departure, he struggled with romance, resorting to hookups before eventually dating multiple people long term.

In the second season, Buck is in an accident with a fire engine, causing significant damage to his leg. In the third season, Buck is not yet cleared for duty due to medical complications from the accident. During this time, Eddie drops off his son Chris to cheer Buck up. While Buck is watching Chris they are caught in a tsunami, with Buck scrambling to save a lost Chris. After this incident Buck remains off the job, briefly attempting to sue the department and Bobby for not allowing him to work. Eventually, Buck is able to return to the job.

In season four, Buck begins therapy, causing Maddie to become concerned. This prompts Maddie to invite their parents to visit, and results in the reveal of Buck's brother Daniel, who died when he was a child. Near the end of season four, a sniper begins targeting firefighters. Eddie is shot and Buck is there to help save his life. After this, Buck becomes reckless in the field, exposing himself to the risk of being shot.

In season five, Buck is dating TV reporter Taylor Kelly, briefly living with her in his loft. When Maddie leaves, Buck is the only one to hear from her directly. Buck hides this fact from Chimney, causing tension between them.

In Season six, he agrees to be a sperm donor for his friend Connor and his wife Kameron, who are having fertility struggles. During a call, he is struck by lightning which causes his heart to stop beating. However, he is successfully revived, with the 118 rushing him to the hospital. While in a coma, he experiences a dream where his brother Daniel never died.

In season 7, he realizes he is bisexual, and begins dating former 118 firefighter Tommy Kinard. Though they later break up following Buck asking Tommy to move in with him.

In season 9, after Buck and Eddie attend the National Firefighting Games in Nashville, they are involved in a car accident in New Mexico orchestrated by waitress Bonnie and her ex-husband Earl. Though they both survive, Buck is abducted by Bonnie, who believes Buck to be a replacement for her brain-dead son. After Eddie rescues Buck, the stress of the kidnapping, Bobby's death, and his physical injuries lead Buck develop a opioid dependency after being previously being prescribed oxycodone for his injuries. After quitting cold turkey, he begins to suffer from a brutal withdrawal process. It gets to a point where, after being left alone in an ambulance, he considers stealing medication to ease his pain, though he ultimately decides not to. He later confesses his dependency to Chimney, who arranges for the 118 to care for Buck, so he is able to manage the rest of his withdrawal symptoms with his found family by his side. Later, he reunites with Connor and Kameron, and their son (and his biological son) Theo. When Connor and Kameron are killed in a car accident shortly after, he decides to become a foster father to Theo and welcomes him to his home.

=== Henrietta Wilson ===
Hen Wilson
- 9-1-1 character
- First appearance: "Pilot" (1.01)
- Created by: Ryan Murphy; Tim Minear; Brad Falchuk
- Portrayed by: Aisha Hinds

In-universe information
- Full name: Henrietta Wilson
- Nickname: Hen
- Occupation: Firefighter & paramedic, Station 118 (Los Angeles Fire Department); Pharmaceutical sales representative (formerly); Lifeguard (formerly)
- Family: Antonia Wilson (mother); Byron Wilson † (father)
- Spouse: Karen Wilson
- Significant other: Eva Mathis (ex-girlfriend)
- Children: Denny Wilson (adoptive son); Mara Driskell (adoptive daughter)

Henrietta "Hen" Wilson (Aisha Hinds) is a firefighter & paramedic at Station 118. Originally a pharmaceutical representative, she left that job and joined the LAFD as a paramedic after saving her life coach with CPR. She was accepted at Station 118, but like Chimney, was met with prejudice and sexism from the captain and teammates. She became partners and close friends with Chimney due to their shared experiences of being minorities within the house. Hen had also met and befriended police sergeant, Athena Grant, who helped encourage her to stand up for herself within the firehouse. She was originally in an emotionally abusive relationship with Eva, who was a drug addict. Eva was then imprisoned, and Hen met Karen (via a blind date Chimney set up) and later married her. They have an adopted son named Denny, who is the biological son of Eva.

After Eva's release from prison, Hen cheated on Karen with her. This gave Eva a reason to try to get custody of Denny, claiming Hen's infidelity proved that her household was unfit for her son.

In Season 3, Hen decides to apply to medical school and is accepted but is unable to fully balance her hectic school schedule with her paramedic job and her family life, and fails a critical examination. She is allowed to return to medical school, but eventually quits in Season 6, preferring to remain a paramedic. In Bobby's absence, she is Interim Captain.

At the start of the seventh season, the 118 responded to a vehicular collision, where Hen was acting captain while Bobby was away. An intoxicated young man caused the crash and Hen offered medical treatment, but the man refused, leading him to die of his injuries. Hen and Karen later foster their second child, a young girl named Mara Driskell. In the beginning, Mara has trouble adjusting and acts out, which makes the couple almost consider removing her. But Hen ultimately decides to not give up on her and they find out both of Mara's parents died on the same night due to an overdose. After showing her they will not give up on her and they care, Mara starts enjoying her new home. Hen and Karen decide to adopt Mara, but their application is blocked and their fostering license is revoked. It is revealed that the man who refused medical treatment and later died ended up being the son of Councilwoman Olivia Ortiz, who was angered at Hen for letting her son die. In the eighth season, Hen is able to expose Ortiz for her corruption, allowing her and Karen to re-assume custody of Mara and have their foster license reinstated.

=== Howard Han ===
Chimney Han
- 9-1-1 character
- First appearance: "Pilot" (1.01)
- Created by: Ryan Murphy; Tim Minear; Brad Falchuk
- Portrayed by: Kenneth Choi

In-universe information
- Full name: Howard Han
- Nicknames: Howie; Chimney; Chim
- Occupation: Fire Captain, Station 118 (Los Angeles Fire Department); Entrepreneur; Boston Medical Corps Volunteer (temporarily); Bartender (formerly)
- Family: Jee-Yun Han † (mother); Sang Han (father); Han Myung-Soon (stepmother); John Lee (foster father); Anne Lee (foster mother); Albert Han (half-brother); Kevin Lee † (foster brother); Evan Buckley (brother-in-law); Daniel Buckley † (brother-in-law)
- Spouse: Maddie Buckley (m. 2024)
- Significant other: Tatiana (ex-girlfriend)
- Children: Jee-Yun Buckley Han (daughter); Robert Nash Han (son)

Howard "Chimney" Han (Kenneth Choi) is the Fire Captain at Station 118, and Maddie's husband. The reason why he is nicknamed "Chimney" and how he got the nickname is a closely guarded secret and to date has not been revealed. He grew up in the Los Angeles area with his mother while his father returned to South Korea, divorced Chimney's mother and remarried; as a result, their already strained relationship worsened. The elder Mr. Han openly expressed his disappointment in Chimney's chosen profession. After his mother's death, Chimney was raised by the Lee family (his mother and Mrs. Lee were best friends) and looks on them as his family. There, he developed a close bond with their son, Kevin Lee and both worked at a karaoke sushi bar the former managed. A fire burned down the building, but it gave both of them a new sense of passion and enter the fire academy together. They both passed the academy; Kevin was placed at Station 133 and Chimney to 118. Upon his arrival, Chimney was met with a prejudiced boss and was not allowed to go on calls, being forced to do grunt work. The other firefighters were also intolerant and would joke around at Chimney's expense. Eventually he met Eli Cobb, a paramedic, which led to Chimney deciding to become a firefighter-paramedic. During a building fire, both the 118 and 133 responded, but Kevin sacrifices himself to save a pregnant woman. At another call, Chimney correctly deduces there is a gas leak and gets Athena Grant to evacuate the area. Fellow firefighter Tommy Kinard was also trapped inside, but was able to be saved before the explosion, thus Chimney earning the firehouse's respect. He was also previously Karen Wilson's neighbor and friend, and the reason she and Hen got together; he had set up a fake blind date for them, and tricked Hen into coming to the bar under the pretense of drinks.

In the first season, Chimney gets into a car crash with a truck carrying rebars. One rebar goes through his head, but he miraculously survives. In the second season, he meets Buck's sister, Maddie, whom he takes a liking to and goes out on a few dates. He meets and befriends her abusive husband, Doug Kendall, although he is unaware of his true identity. One night when Chimney was coming over to Maddie's house, Doug gets through the gates and stabs him. This allowed Doug to kidnap Maddie.

In the third season, Chimney and Maddie's relationship continues to grow and they officially start going out. His younger half-brother, Albert, makes a surprise visit after he secretly left South Korea to escape their father, with whom he had been living for a while. At first, Chimney is cold towards him but after hashing things out, he starts embracing Albert as his brother and they live together for a while. At the end of the season, Maddie and Chimney find out she is pregnant and the baby is Chimney’s.

In the fourth season, Chimney has been staying with Buck, while Maddie is with Albert during lockdown. While Chimney is being overly cautious as to not risk Maddie getting COVID, he is also nervous to be living with her. Eventually he does decide to go back home with Maddie, while Albert goes to live with Buck. During a pile up on the highway, Maddie goes into labor and gives birth to their daughter, Jee-Yun, who is named after Chimney's late mother. Maddie starts developing postpartum depression, and it worsens due to Chimney's busy work schedule.

Chimney tries to be there for Maddie, but also does not fully understand the state of her condition. When Maddie disappears for several months, it leaves Chimney distraught and emotional, and at first believes someone was forcing her to leave. He decides to track Maddie down and bring her home, bringing Jee-Yun along for the ride. His search leads him to Boston, where he stays with his old friend and colleague, Eli, and also volunteers at the Boston Medical Corps. When responding to a woman for alcohol poisoning, he reunites with Maddie, who had been getting treatment for her postpartum in Boston for the past six months. The two of them talk and tearfully apologize to one another before Chimney takes Maddie to reunite with Jee-Yun. When they return to Los Angeles, they decide to break up but continue to co-parent.

In the sixth season, Chimney and Maddie get back together, realizing they still love each other. They buy a house together and throw a house warming party. Albert returns from Korea, but to Chimney's surprise and displeasure, had brought their dad along to meet Jee-Yun. Albert thought it would be a good idea for Jee-Yun to have a relationship with her grandfather, despite Chimney's own poor relationship with him.

Chimney decides to propose to Maddie, but continues to go back and forth on whether or not to go through with this proposal. He eventually gets the ring but misplaces it and thinks it is a sign to not marry her. However, it turned out Jee-Yun had it and Maddie found it in her dollhouse. After trying it on and not being able to get it off, Maddie decides to propose to Chimney instead and they get engaged. He also aids Hen's investigation into Jonah's past and crimes, which leads to both of them being kidnapped.

Their wedding is shown in the seventh season, but it is halted due to Chimney going missing. He had caught viral encephalitis while on a call, which caused him to forget almost 20 years of his life and wandered to the old sushi bar he previously worked at. While his friends and family searched for him, Chimney hallucinated the deceased Doug Kendall and Kevin Lee. After "talking" to Kevin's ghost, he manages to make it back to Mr. and Mrs. Lee's house and he is taken to the hospital to be treated. Maddie and Chimney get married in the hospital.

In the eighth season, Maddie and Chimney become Mara Driskell's temporary foster parents in order to help Hen and Karen be able to still see her. This gets Maddie thinking about having another baby after seeing Jee-Yun and Mara together. They later find out that Maddie is pregnant with a boy.

During this season, Chimney is exposed to CCHF when the team responds to a call in a bio-hazard lab. As this is a sped up strain of the virus, he suffers from heavy bleeding (especially for his nose). Fearing his death, the team sneaks in the only antidote to save him. This means that Bobby Nash, who was also infected, but hid it from everyone, ends up succumbing to the virus. In a flash-forward at the end of the season, Chimney reveals his and Maddie's son is named Robert Nash Han.

=== Maddie Han ===
Maddie Han
- 9-1-1 character
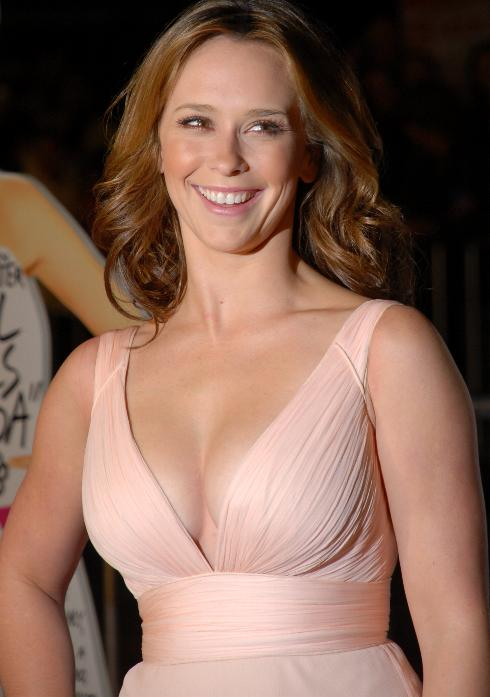
- Jennifer Love Hewitt portrays Maddie Han.
- First appearance: "Under Pressure" (2.01)
- Created by: Ryan Murphy; Tim Minear; Brad Falchuk
- Portrayed by: Jennifer Love Hewitt; Molly Jackson (child); Maddie Levy (young adult)

In-universe information
- Full name: Maddie Han; Maddie Buckley (birth name); Maddie Kendall (former married name)
- Occupation: 9-1-1 dispatcher; Nurse (formerly)
- Family: Margaret Buckley (mother); Phillip Buckley (father); Evan Buckley (brother); Daniel Buckley † (brother); Albert Han (brother-in-law)
- Spouses: Howard Han (m. 2024) Doug Kendall (died 2019)
- Children: Jee-Yun Buckley Han (daughter); Robert Nash Han (son)
- Origin: Hershey, Pennsylvania, USA

Maddie Han (née Buckley) (Jennifer Love Hewitt) (season 2 – present) is a 9-1-1 operator, Buck's sister, and Chimney's wife, who replaced Abby Clark as the series' main dispatcher. Originally a nurse at a Boston hospital, Maddie fled to Los Angeles to escape her emotionally and physically abusive husband, Doug Kendall. Buck was instrumental in helping her get a job as a 911 Emergency Dispatcher, as Maddie did not want to keep being a nurse but she still wanted to be able to help other people. She meets Chimney when he helps her move into her new house and they go out on a few dates. Doug tracks Maddie down in L.A. and befriends Chimney, albeit under a fake name, in order to keep tabs on her. He manages to get past her security gate, stabs Chimney, and kidnaps her. While stopping at a gas station, the cashier attempts to help Maddie escape Doug, only to be shot and killed by the latter. Doug brings her to the woods where there are a bunch of lodges. Maddie attacks him and after a brief struggle Maddie manages to stab Doug, killing him. Only as Buck is bringing her home does Maddie learn that Chimney survived his stabbing.

In the third season, she attempts to help a woman who is being abused by her husband, but in the end the woman proves she cannot be helped and stays with her husband. In the episode "The Taking of Dispatch 9-1-1", the call center is taken over by a group of thieves, holding the entire staff hostage in a planned heist. Their plan is then foiled with the help of Athena & LAPD. Maddie's relationship with Chimney also grows, with the two officially dating and at the end of the season the couple find out they are having a baby together.

In the fourth season, a pregnant Maddie is in isolation with Chimney's brother, Albert, in an attempt to keep her from getting COVID. Eventually the two move back in with each other. Maddie also trains Athena's daughter, May, to be a dispatcher. During a call for a highway pile up, Maddie goes into labor and attempts to keep working, but is eventually forced to go to the hospital. She gives birth to a baby girl, Jee-Yun, who they name after Chimney's late mother. After the birth of Jee-Yun, Maddie starts experiencing postpartum depression, which causes her to quit her job at dispatch.

In season five, Maddie's postpartum worsens and while giving Jee-Yun a bath, she accidentally lets her slip underwater due to dozing off. This scares Maddie into believing she is not a good mother, and her daughter is not safe with her. She records a video for Chimney to explain her disappearance and drops Jee-Yun off at the fire station. She heads to Boston where she enters a program for women diagnosed with PPD for six months, and is absent for several episodes (Hewitt was on maternity leave). After some checkups, her condition is eventually cured but decides to stay in Boston for a bit longer. Chimney, who has been searching for Maddie since she left, runs into her while volunteering for Boston Medical Corps. The two talk things out and she returns home, although they decide to break up for the time being. Maddie resumes her job at dispatch at the end of the season.

In the sixth season, she and Chimney get back together, where they buy a new house together. Chimney also decides to propose to her, but goes back and forth on whether to go through with it. He also misplaces the ring, which Maddie later finds. She then proposes to him instead, and they get married the following season. She soon becomes pregnant with their second child in season 8, who they later find out is a boy.

In Season 8, Maddie is involved in a call where the distressed caller begs her for help, so as to not hurt a child. Reflecting on her PPD, she urges the caller to commit suicide. However, later it is revealed the caller is actually a detective with dissociative identity disorder, and kidnaps Maddie due to her uncovering the caller is a serial killer. There she gets her throat slashed (which later causes her to temporarily lose her voice due to psychological trauma), but is rescued by Athena and Chimney. At the end of Season 8, Maddie delivers son Robert Nash Han, named after the fire captain who sacrificed himself to save Chimney. In Season 9, when the call center manager, Sue, suffers a stroke, she assigns Maddie as her replacement.

=== Edmundo Diaz ===
Eddie Diaz
- 9-1-1 character
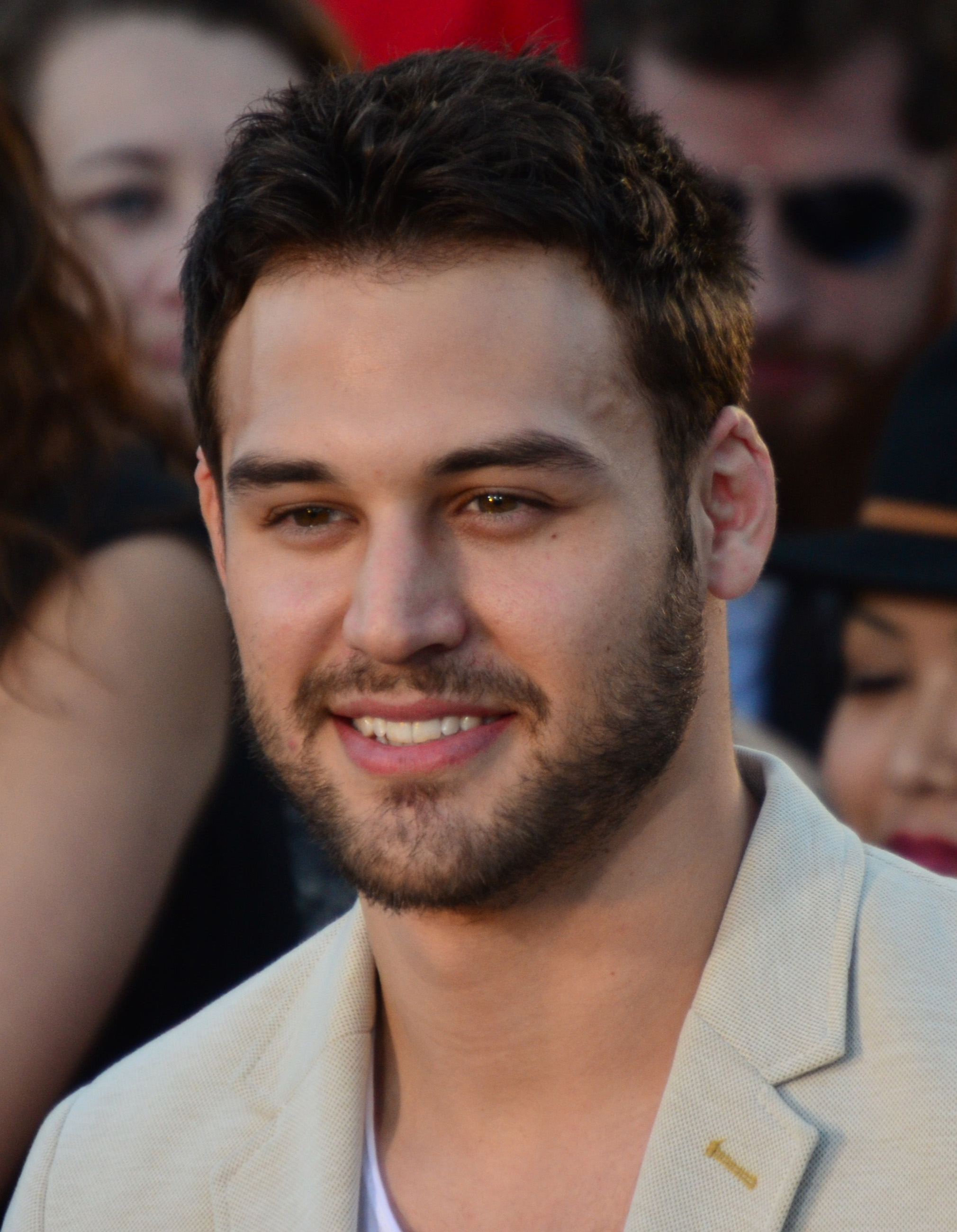
- Ryan Guzman portrays Edmundo Diaz.
- First appearance: "Under Pressure" (2.01)
- Created by: Ryan Murphy; Tim Minear; Brad Falchuk
- Portrayed by: Ryan Guzman

In-universe information
- Full name: Edmundo Diaz
- Nickname: Eddie
- Occupation: Station 118 Firefighter (Los Angeles Fire Department); United States Army combat medic (formerly)
- Family: Helena Diaz (mother); Ramon Diaz (father); Sophia Diaz (sister); Adriana Diaz (sister)
- Spouse: Shannon Diaz (m. 2010; died 2019)
- Significant others: Ana Flores (ex-girlfriend); Marisol (ex-girlfriend); Kim (emotional affair)
- Children: Christopher Diaz (son)
- Origin: El Paso, Texas, USA

Edmundo "Eddie" Diaz (Ryan Guzman) (season 2 – present) is a firefighter and Christopher's father. A Texas native, he served in the United States Army as a combat medic and moved to Los Angeles after being discharged, joining the 118 fresh out of the academy. He served in Afghanistan and his combat experience is shown through his ability to think quickly on his feet even under duress with minimal back-up. He married his high school sweetheart, Shannon, and had a son named Christopher when they were both 19. In his origin episode, "Eddie Begins", he discovers their son has cerebral palsy and he re-enlists for another tour in 2013. This causes a strain on his marriage, which was already having issues but Eddie left anyways, saying it was to provide for the family. Shannon was left to raise their son alone while Eddie was deployed, which put a lot of stress on her. When he returned, Shannon left Texas to take care of her sick mom in California as well as escape her marital issues with Eddie. She still did not return when her mom died and was MIA for two years, leaving Eddie to raise Christopher alone. His relationship with his own parents was rocky at best, as they viewed Eddie incapable of taking care of his son. They insisted Christopher live with them for consistency, which causes Eddie to storm out mid-argument. He decides to move to Los Angeles to escape them, taking Christopher with him. Upon entering the 118, Eddie fits right in with the team, much to Buck's jealousy. He assures Buck there is no need for them to be at odds, and they eventually earn each other's respect during one of their first calls together. Eddie struggles to juggle the life of a single dad to a kid with special needs, as well as the long work hours as a firefighter. Buck introduces him to Carla Price, the home health nurse of Abby Clark's late mother, Patricia, and she becomes a home health aid and friend for the Diazes.

Shannon returns to Eddie's life when he needs her in order to get Christopher into a school for special needs kids. They start sleeping with each other in secret for two months, with Christopher being unaware of her presence. Eddie is hesitant to let Shannon see him due not trusting she will not walk out on them again. She eventually reunites with Christopher on Christmas Day and the three of them fall into a routine. As they wonder where their relationship stands, Shannon thinks she might be pregnant which makes Eddie want them to be a family again. At a dinner, Shannon reveals she is not pregnant and thinks they should get a divorce, as she is still learning to be a mother. However, Shannon is hit by a car and dies on the way to the hospital.

In the third season, Eddie leaves Christopher with Buck, as the latter could not go back to work due to the bombing injury. A tsunami hits L.A. and the 118 helps the victims, unaware Buck and Christopher were out on the boardwalk when the wave hit. Eddie meets firefighter Lena Bosko (Ronda Rousey) and befriends her. At the end of the night, Eddie finds Buck, who is about to tell him he lost Christopher, before a woman had found him. The next day, Eddie drops Christopher off again at Buck's loft to babysit. Eddie joins an illegal fight club to cope with his anger over Shannon's passing, and gets arrested after knocking one of his opponents out. He also struggles to help Christopher deal with his trauma over his near-death experience with the tsunami.

In the fourth season, a sniper targeting firefighters is on the loose and Eddie is shot in the shoulder. Buck and some other firefighters manage to save Eddie and get him to the hospital. After the sniper is caught, Eddie reveals to Buck he updated his will. He named Buck to be the legal guardian of his son Christopher, as Eddie trusts him the most to take care of Christopher if he died.

In the fifth season, Eddie starts experiencing panic attacks due to a multiple things such as the thought of commitment to his then girlfriend, Ana Flores, and his shooting. In "Brawl in Cell Block 9-1-1", he and Buck are taken hostage by two escaped prisoners, which leaves Eddie shaken. In the episode "Wrapped in Red", Christopher gets obsessed with having a perfect Christmas and expresses his fear of Eddie being dead next year. This leads to Eddie making an impulsive decision by quitting the 118, thinking about what is best for his son. He ends up joining the call center as a liaison, which he does not really enjoy. Eddie attempts to return to the 118, but Bobby refuses as he does not think he is mentally ready. After some therapy sessions, Eddie tries to reach out to people he saved while in the army, only to find out they all died. Christopher calls Buck when he hears crashing and crying coming from Eddie's room. It is clear that Eddie is dealing with a lot of grief and trauma, and not properly dealing with it. When the call center catches on fire, Eddie jumps in to help, restoring his passion as a firefighter and rejoins the 118.

In season 7, Eddie starts dating Marisol. After a few bumps in their relationship (including temporarily moving in together), it seems to be fairly stable. However, during one of their dates, Eddie sees a doppelganger of his wife, a shop-assistant and actor named Kim. This causes Eddie to regress his progress as he starts an emotional affair with. She plays into this fantasy (including dressing up as Shannon), which Christopher and Marisol walk in on. This ends his relationship with Marisol, and causes Chris to move back to Texas with his grandparents.

In season 8 Chris chooses to remain with his grandparents, so Eddie decides to move back to Texas to spend more time with his son. As such, he buys a fixer-upper house, and sublets his LA one to Buck. Despite having glowing references, he does not get a job at the Fire Department, leading him to become an Uber driver. Following Bobby's death, he and Christopher move back to LA where he rejoins the 118.

=== May Grant ===
May Grant
- 9-1-1 character
- First appearance: "Pilot" (1.01)
- Created by: Ryan Murphy; Tim Minear; Brad Falchuk
- Portrayed by: Corinne Massiah

In-universe information
- Full name: May Grant
- Occupation: Nurse; College student (graduated); 9-1-1 dispatcher (formerly)
- Family: Athena Grant-Nash (mother); Michael Grant (father); Harry Grant (brother); Beatrice Carter (grand-mother); Samuel Carter (grand-father); Bobby Nash † (step-father); David Hale (step-father)
- Significant other: Ravi Panikkar (boyfriend)

May Grant (Corinne Massiah) (seasons 2–6, 9; recurring seasons 1, 8; guest season 7) is Athena and Michael's daughter. She attempts suicide in the first season due to being bullied by some girls in her school. Athena manages to save her in time and she recovers. She and Athena bump heads a lot over their views on life, as well as Athena's job as a cop. After she graduates high school, she decides to take time off before going to college and gets a job as a dispatcher in season four, despite Athena's initial resistance. However May stated the reason for her becoming a dispatcher so that Athena would not be alone during calls, after the confrontation with Jeffrey Hudson. In season five, May starts a rivalry with veteran dispatcher, Claudette Collins, after the latter continuously ridicules her whenever they worked together. She then leaves her job at dispatch to attend college full-time at University of Southern California, making occasional appearances since then.

After graduating college, she considers becoming a lawyer to follow in Athena's footsteps. However, after being rejected for an internship at a law firm, she realizes that law is not her desired path; she decides to apply to nursing school instead. She also begins dating Ravi Panikkar, a firefighter at the 118.

=== Harry Grant ===
Harry Grant
- 9-1-1 character
- First appearance: "Pilot" (1.01)
- Created by: Ryan Murphy; Tim Minear; Brad Falchuk
- Portrayed by: Marcanthonee Jon Reis (seasons 1–6); Elijah M. Cooper (season 7 – present)

In-universe information
- Full name: Harold Grant
- Occupation: Student (dropped out); Barista (formerly); Firefighter
- Family: Athena Grant-Nash (mother); Michael Grant (father); May Grant (sister); Beatrice Carter (grand-mother); Samuel Carter (grand-father); Bobby Nash † (step-father); David Hale (step-father)
- Origin: Los Angeles, California, USA

Harold "Harry" Grant (Marcanthonee Jon Reis (seasons 1–6) and Elijah M. Cooper (season 7 – present)) (seasons 2–6, 9; recurring seasons 1, 7–8) is Athena and Michael's son. In the fifth season, Harry is kidnapped by serial rapist, Jeffrey Hudson, as revenge against Athena for arresting him. After his rescue, Harry has trouble coping with his trauma and it causes him to blame both Athena and Michael.

He later goes to live with Michael in Florida, but comes back to L.A. in the series' 100th episode after punching a store clerk and is now wanted by the police. Although he doesn’t serve jailtime, he must remain in L.A. to serve his community service. In the ninth season, Harry dropped out of high school as soon as he turned 18 and started working as a barista. He decided to become a firefighter, much to Athena's dismay. He completes his training and is placed at the 118.

Marcanthonee Jon Reis portrayed Harry in the first five seasons and declined to return in the seventh season. He was replaced by Elijah M. Cooper.

=== Christopher Diaz ===
Christopher Diaz
- 9-1-1 character
- First appearance: "7.1" (2.02)
- Created by: Ryan Murphy; Tim Minear; Brad Falchuk
- Portrayed by: Gavin McHugh

In-universe information
- Full name: Christopher Diaz
- Nickname: Chris
- Occupation: Student
- Family: Eddie Diaz (father); Shannon Diaz † (mother); Ramon Diaz (grandfather); Helena Diaz (grandmother); Isabel Diaz (great-grandmother); Josephina (great-aunt)
- Origin: El Paso, Texas, USA

Christopher Diaz (Gavin McHugh) (season 3 – present; recurring season 2) is Eddie's son and was born with cerebral palsy. He develops a strong relationship with Buck, leading to Eddie officially makes Buck Christopher's legal guardian in case of anything serious happening to Eddie. He is extremely sweet-natured and shows remarkable empathy with other troubled people. While he seems to have come to terms with the death of his mother, Shannon, (killed in a traffic accident in Season 2), at the beginning to Season 7, he is worried that he has begun to forget her (which Eddie remedies by giving Christopher a letter she had written to Christopher years ago). At the end of Season 7, he leaves to live with his grandparents in Texas upon learning of Eddie's affair with Kim (a look-alike of Shannon, briefly having the impression that his mother was alive). At the end of Season 8, he moves back to LA.

== Former main characters ==
=== Abigail Clark ===
Abby Clark
- 9-1-1 character
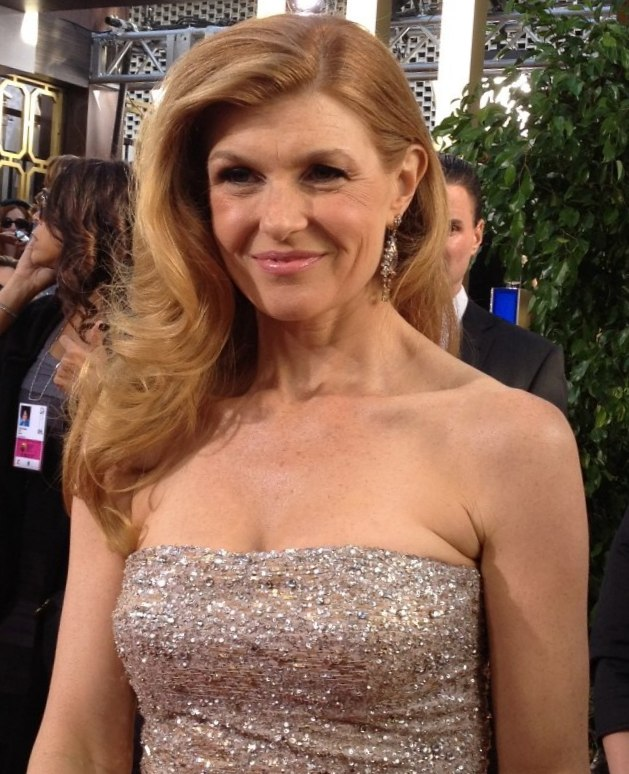
- Connie Britton portrayed Abigail Clark.
- First appearance: "Pilot" (1.01)
- Last appearance: "A Whole New You" (1.10) (as series regular) "What's Next?" (3.18) (as guest star)
- Created by: Ryan Murphy; Tim Minear; Brad Falchuk
- Portrayed by: Connie Britton

In-universe information
- Full name: Abigail Clark
- Nickname: Abby
- Occupation: 9-1-1 dispatcher (formerly); Olympic swimmer (formerly)
- Family: Patricia Clark † (mother); Matthew Clark (brother); Beth Clark (sister-in-law)
- Significant others: Evan Buckley (ex-boyfriend); Tommy Kinard (ex-fiancé); Sam Egan (fiancé)

Abigail "Abby" Clark (Connie Britton) (season 1; special guest season 3) was the series' main 9-1-1 operator for the first season. She lived and cared for her mother who had Alzheimer's, which took up almost all of her free time. Feeling stuck and unlucky in finding love, she eventually meets Buck and begins a relationship with him. Abby leaves at the end of season one to travel the world following her mother's death. She had told Buck she would come back to him, but she never did and he got tired of waiting for her. Abby returns to Los Angeles at the end of the third season and she had gotten engaged to a new man since her departure. She and her fiancé now live in Arizona and they took a train to L.A. The train derails and she calls it into 9-1-1, which was answered by Buck's sister, Maddie. She and Buck reunite at the scene and Abby reveals she is engaged. After saving her fiancé, Buck meets up with Abby to get closure. She explains she had initially intended to come back, but was worried she would lose her sense of self and revert to the person she was before she left. Abby apologizes for Buck finding out about Sam the way he did.

In season 8, it was revealed that Abby's ex she mentions in her voiceover in "Pilot", is Buck's boyfriend at the time, Tommy Kinard. Tommy had said breaking up with her was the only honest thing he did in that relationship, although the breakup left Abby devastated. Tommy unknowingly called Buck the "himbo" who was half Abby's age who dated her after him.

Connie Britton had originally signed a one-year deal with 9-1-1, as she had just finished starring in Nashville and did not want to do another series right away. As a result, her character was written out at the end of the first season and was replaced by Jennifer Love Hewitt.

=== Albert Han ===
Albert Han
- 9-1-1 character
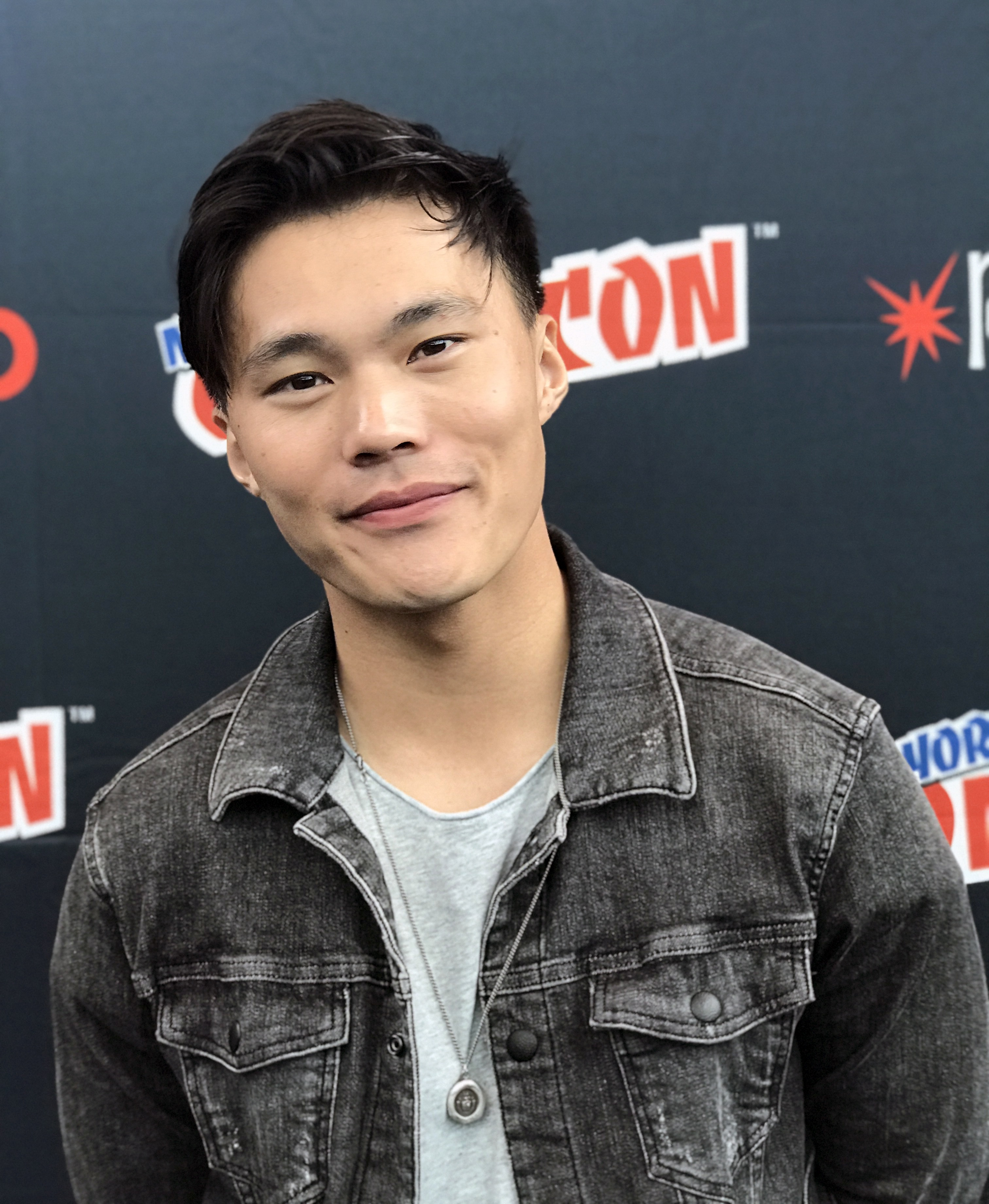
- John Harlan Kim portrays Albert Han.
- First appearance: "Seize the Day" (3.11)
- Last appearance: "Survivors" (4.14) (as series regular) "In Another Life" (6.11) (as guest star)
- Created by: Ryan Murphy; Tim Minear; Brad Falchuk
- Portrayed by: John Harlan Kim

In-universe information
- Full name: Albert Han
- Occupation: Firefighter (formerly)
- Family: Howard Han (half-brother); Sang Han (father); Myung-Soon Han (mother); Maddie Han (half-sister-in-law); Jee-Yun Buckley-Han (half-niece)
- Significant other: Veronica (ex-girlfriend)
- Origin: South Korea

Albert Han (John Harlan Kim) (season 4; recurring season 5; guest seasons 3, 6) is Chimney's half-brother. He had secretly left South Korea to escape his father's authoritarianism and came to Los Angeles to find his half-brother, Chimney. There was rocky, but they were able to patch things up and with Chimney embraced having Albert in L.A. After Maddie moved in, Albert went to live with Buck. Their friendship was strained for a moment after Albert started dating a girl Buck had a bad first date with. A pile up was caused by a drunk driver, which Albert was one of the casualties and ended up in a ditch not far from the scene. He was rescued by the 118 and stayed with Chimney and Maddie while he recovered. Albert is shown to have finished his training for LAFD by the end of season 4, becoming a full firefighter. He is placed in Station 133, and is feeling dissatisfied with the job. Albert finds being a firefighter is a lot harder than he thought and realizes he is not cut out for the job and quits. He goes back to South Korea and visits Chimney in season 6, bringing their estranged parents along so they can meet Jee.

=== Michael Grant ===
Michael Grant
- 9-1-1 character
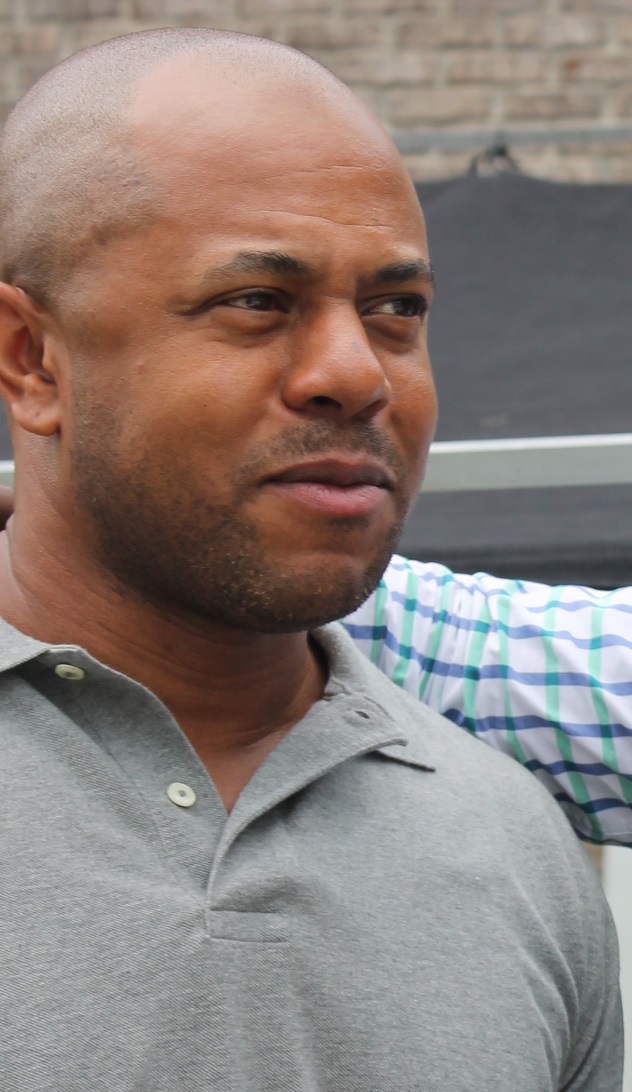
- Rockmond Dunbar portrayed Michael Grant.
- First appearance: "Pilot" (1.01)
- Last appearance: "Defend In Place" (5.08)
- Created by: Ryan Murphy; Tim Minear; Brad Falchuk
- Portrayed by: Rockmond Dunbar; Freddy D. Ramsey Jr. (Young adult)

In-universe information
- Full name: Michael W. Grant
- Occupation: Architect; President of HOA
- Spouses: Athena Grant-Nash (m. 2001; div. 2018) David Hale (m. 2024)
- Significant other: Glenn (ex-boyfriend)
- Children: May Grant (daughter); Harry Grant (son)

Michael Grant (Rockmond Dunbar) (seasons 1–5) is Athena's ex-husband. The two were married for seventeen years and at first they try to stay married for the sake of their kids. Eventually they amicably divorce after he comes out as gay. He and Athena remain close friends and confidants, and the friendship extends to her new husband Bobby. In season two, Michael, May and Harry are pulled over for seemingly no reason, and the situation escalates and a gun is pulled on the kids. Athena tries seeing things from the cop's point of view, which upsets her family. Michael finds out he has a brain tumor in season three and starts distancing himself from his family to make it easier on them in case he dies. After a camping trip with Bobby and Harry, Michael is persuaded into getting treatment for his cancer so he does not miss out on his kids' achievements like May's graduation. The treatment proves to be a success and the tumor shrinks by 30%. Michael eventually meets David Hale, a doctor, and starts dating him. He eventually proposes to him and then decides to go Haiti with him to help with their medical emergencies after the devastating storms of 2021. In season 7, Athena says he and David are in Florida and have since gotten married.

Rockmond Dunbar exited the series midway through the fifth season due to FOX's COVID-19 vaccine mandate and his request for medical and religious exceptions being denied.

=== Robert Nash ===
Bobby Nash
- 9-1-1 character
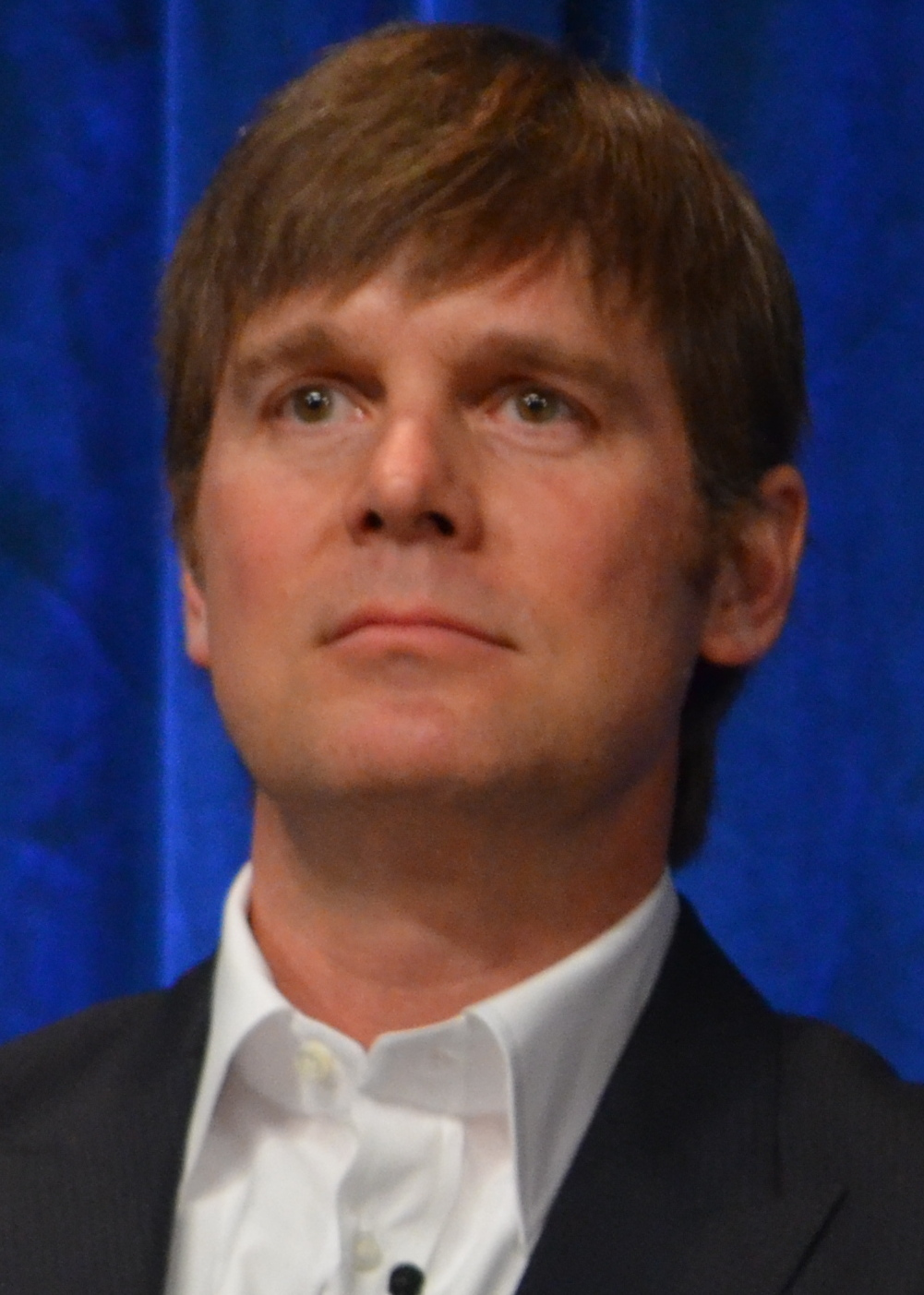
- Peter Krause portrays Bobby Nash
- First appearance: "Pilot" (1.01)
- Last appearance: "Don't Drink the Water" (8.17)
- Created by: Ryan Murphy; Tim Minear; Brad Falchuk
- Portrayed by: Peter Krause; Mark Sodukh (child)

In-universe information
- Full name: Robert Wade Nash
- Nickname: Bobby
- Occupation: Station 118 Captain (Los Angeles Fire Department)
- Family: Ann Hutchinson (mother); Tim Nash † (father); Charlie Nash (brother)
- Spouses: Athena Grant (m. 2019) Marcy Nash (died 2014)
- Children: Robert Nash Jr. † (son); Brooke Nash † (daughter); May Grant (step-daughter); Harry Grant (step-son)
- Origin: St. Paul, Minnesota, USA

Robert Wade "Bobby" Nash (Peter Krause) (seasons 1–8) was the captain of Station 118 in the Los Angeles Fire Department and the husband of LAPD sergeant Athena Grant-Nash. Originally from St. Paul, Minnesota, Bobby hailed from three generations of firefighters with him idolizing his father Tim. Bobby's father died because of his alcoholism and Bobby became a firefighter. He relocated to Los Angeles after a tragic apartment fire—caused by a faulty propane heater and compounded by building code violations—killed his wife, two children, and 145 others. Blaming himself for the incident, Bobby struggled with alcoholism and survivor’s guilt, initially planning to atone by saving 145 lives before ending his own life.

After transferring to the LAFD (with his record partially sanitized), Bobby took command of the 118, helping transform it from a troubled firehouse into one of the most respected in the department. He formed close bonds with his team, became a father figure to Buck, a stepfather to May and Harry, and developed a strong friendship with Athena’s ex-husband, Michael. Known for his compassion, leadership, and cooking, Bobby’s influence became central to the series.

In Season 8, Episode 15 ("Lab Rats"), Bobby dies after contracting a deadly virus during a response and giving the only vial of vaccine to a fellow firefighter, sacrificing himself to save his crew. The episode ends with his death confirmed, marking the first main character death in the series and signaling a major turning point for the show.

== Recurring characters ==
This is a list of recurring actors and the characters they portrayed in multiple episodes, which were significant roles, sometimes across multiple seasons.

=== Introduced in season 1 ===
- Mariette Hartley as Patricia Clark, Abby's mother, who suffers from Alzheimer's. She passes away in the penultimate episode of season 1
- Gavin Stenhouse as Father Brian, a priest who gives Bobby advice following the death of his family. He returns for brief appearances in season 2 and later in season 8 to provide help for Eddie and Buck.
- Alex Loynaz as Terry Flores, 911 technician
- Cocoa Brown as Carla Price, Abby's mother's nurse and later a health-aide for Christopher Diaz
- Claudia Christian as Captain Elaine Maynard, Athena's direct superior at the LAPD
- Tracie Thoms as Karen Wilson, Hen's wife, an aerospace industry engineer
- Abby Brammell as Eva Mathis, Hen's substance-addicted ex-girlfriend and Denny's biological mother
- Declan Pratt as Denny Wilson, Hen and Karen's adopted son
- Debra Christofferson as Sue Blevins, 911 call center manager
- Michelle Bernard as Carol Branford, an LAPD officer under Athena's command

=== Introduced in season 2 ===
- Chiquita Fuller as Linda Bates, 911 operator
- Bryan Safi as Josh Russo, 911 dispatch's supervisor and training officer and Maddie's friend
- Tiffany Dupont as Ali Martin, Buck's girlfriend who broke up with him during the last episode of the season
- Jonathan Grebe as John, a paramedic
- Ana Mercedes as Isabel Diaz, Eddie's grandmother
- Devin Kelley as Shannon Diaz, Eddie's estranged wife and Christopher's mother who is later killed in a road accident. In Season 7, Kelley also plays Kim, who is Shannon's doppelganger whom Eddie has an emotional affair with.
- Freda Foh Shen as Anne Lee, who raised Chimney after his mother died.
- Kelvin Han Yee as John Lee
- James Chen as Kevin Lee, Chimney's "brother", who becomes a firefighter along with Chimney and is killed in the line of duty.
- Rick Chambers as Dwight Meyerson, a news reporter
- Lou Ferrigno Jr. as Thomas "Tommy" Kinard, a firefighter with the 118 prior to 2005 up to 2016, when he moved to the aerial division with Station 217. He returns in season 7, is revealed to be gay, and begins a relationship with Buck. In season 8 it is revealed that he also dated Abby. They ended their engagement after he came out. Tommy and Buck break up in season 8.
- Brian Thompson as Captain Vincent Gerrard, the captain of the 118 prior to 2005 up to 2008 when he was dismissed for racial prejudice. He returns in season 7, where he takes over the 118 following Bobby's resignation. He is especially harsh on Buck, but softens up when Buck saves him from a malfunctioning saw. Eventually, he leaves the 118 after helping Bobby and Hen take down Councilwoman Ortiz.
- Brian Hallisay as Doug Kendall / Jason Bailey, Maddie's abusive ex-husband (Brian Hallisay is Jennifer Love Hewitt's husband).
- Megan West as Taylor Kelly, a TV reporter who has an on-off relationship with Buck.
- Danny Nucci as Rick Romero, a detective who Athena occasionally assists.
- Troy Winbush as Nathaniel Greene, Denny's biological father.

=== Introduced in season 3 ===
- Chris Wu as Officer Williams, an LAPD officer under Athena's command
- Ronda Rousey as Lena Bosko, a firefighter temporarily assigned to the 118
- Leonard Roberts as Captain Ronnie Cooper
- Theo Breaux as Firefighter Stover
- Joe Pistone as Firefighter Calley
- Peter Jang as Firefighter Logan
- Ashwin Gore as Jamal Momed, 911 Operator
- Sean Kleier as Greg, an armed robber who seduces Josh in order to clone his access card and hold dispatch hostage
- Gabrielle Walsh as Ana Flores, Christopher's teacher in Season 3. She dated Eddie in season 4 and 5, until he broke up with her.
- Sasha Roiz as Lou Ransone, a detective and colleague of Athena, who reappears in season 4 and season 5 and is injured by the serial rapist who attacked Athena.

=== Introduced in season 4 ===
- Margot Terry as Nia, a young girl Hen and Karen foster
- Anirudh Pisharody as Ravi Panikkar, a probationary firefighter with the 118 who appears sporadically in season 4, later becoming a staple of the main 118 team. He begins dating May in season 9.
- Marsha Warfield as Antonia "Toni" Wilson, Hen's mother

=== Introduced in season 5 ===
- Vanessa Estelle Williams as Claudette Collins, an outspoken call center veteran, who transfers back to the LA station, intimidating May Grant. She dies following a devastating fire at the call center, but several of the 118 suspect foul play.
- Bryce Durfee as Jonah Greenway, a new firefighter/paramedic filling in for Chimney at Station 118, who is later revealed to be a serial killer. He was proven to be directly responsible for the death of Claudette Collins.
- Arielle Kebbel as Lucy Donato, a new firefighter filling in for Eddie at Station 118.

=== Introduced in season 6 ===
- Alfonso Caballero as Noah Carmack, a new intern at the dispatch center who works under Maddie's supervision.
- Edy Ganem as Marisol, Eddie's ex-girlfriend
- Annalise Cepero as Natalia Dollenmeyer, a death doula who Buck dates, and later breaks up with the following season.

=== Introduced in season 7 ===
- Askyler Bell as Mara Driskell, a young girl whose parents died due to an overdose and Hen & Karen's new foster daughter. She becomes an official member of the Wilson family after Hen and Karen finalize her adoption at the end of season 8.
- Malcolm-Jamal Warner as Amir Casey, a nurse who lost his wife in the same fire that killed Bobby's family in Minnesota.

=== Introduced in season 8 ===
- Callum Blue as Brad Torrence, a TV star who plays a fire captain on the in-universe show, Hotshots.

== Guest stars ==
The following is a supplementary list of guest stars, some recurring, who appear in lesser roles.

=== Introduced in season one ===
- John Marshall Jones as Dave Morrisey
- Rachel Breitag as Tatiana, Chimney's ex-girlfriend
- Troy Ian Hall as Police Officer
- Doug Savant as Matthew Clark, Abby's brother
- Wolé Parks as Glenn, Michael's ex-boyfriend; later replaced by Reggie Austin in season 2
- Genneya Walton as Laila Creedy
- Brielle Barbusca as Cooper
- Josephine Lawrence as Georgina
- Noelle E. Parker as Brooke Nash, Bobby's late daughter
- London Cheshire as Robert Nash Jr., Bobby's late son
- Laura Allen as Marcy Nash, Bobby's late wife
- Colby French as Detective Andy Marks
- Jennifer Aspen as Lorraine Collins, an insurance fraudster and former porch pirate
- Todd Williams as Aaron Brooks, Athena's ex-boyfriend

=== Introduced in season two ===
- Connor Trinneer as Jessie
- Eric Nenninger as Brian
- Ali Hillis as Jen
- T. J. Linnard as Russ
- Romi Dias as Chief Miranda Williams
- Connor Dean as Tucker
- Nev Scharrel as Kat
- Kendra Chell as Ainsley
- Burt Grinstead as Drew Hudson
- Terri Hoyos as Aunt Josephina, Eddie's aunt
- Christine Estabrook as Gloria Wagner, a 911 dispatcher fired for negligence
- Justin James Farley as Bret
- Romy Rosemont as Lola Peterson. Lola returns in the first three episodes of Season 7.
- Daniel Roebuck as Norman Peterson. Norman returns in the first three episodes of Season 7.
- Gino Anthony Pesi as Sal Deluca, a firefighter with the 118 prior to 2008 until he was transferred to the 122 by Bobby for insubordination
- Mark Derwin as Captain Thomas
- Tyler Ross as Brandon Skinner
- Beverly Todd as Beatrice Carter, Athena's mother
- Joseph Lyle Taylor as Marty Collins, the 118's resident mechanic
- Lauren Stamile as Ellie Costas
- Anthony Turpel as Freddie Costas, a serial bomber who tries to kill Athena and Bobby for jailing his late father over an insurance fraud fire
- Michael Whaley as Commander Bowman
- Julian Works as Marvin Chavez, cousin of Mateo Chavez (Austin firefighter, station 126)

=== Introduced in season three ===
- William Russ as Chuck
- Ava Acres as Charlotte
- Brian Tichnell as Max Green
- Elia Cantu as Stacy Green
- Jeff Pierre as Emmett Washington (Athena's late fiancé)
- Deborah Strang as Adele Summers
- Conor Romero as Jason Summers
- Ellen Hollman as Tara, a domestic abuse victim Maddie tries unsuccessfully to help
- Jordan Belfi as Chase Mackey
- Scott Speiser as Vincent
- Jocelyn Hudon as Tiffany
- Jayson Blair as Jake
- Rumer Willis as Georgia

=== Introduced in season four ===
- Nikki DeLoach as Janell Hansen
- Vanessa Marano as Sydney
- Gregory Harrison as Phillip Buckley
- Dee Wallace as Margaret Buckley
- Leah Pipes as Molly
- Merrick McCartha as Aldous Pate

=== Introduced in season five ===
- Kim Estes as Clive Wexler
- Gabrielle Walsh as Ana Flores
- Megan West as Taylor Kelly
- La Monde Byrd as Dr. David Hale
- Sasha Roiz as Det. Lou Ransone
- Noah Bean as Jeffery Hudson
- Ashwin Gore as Jamal Momed
- Alex Loynaz as Terry Flores

=== Introduced in season six ===
- Henry G. Sanders as Samuel Carter
- Maurice J. Irvin as Wendall Davis
- Troy Winbush as Nathaniel Greene
- Annelise Cepero as Natalia Dollenmeyer
- Colin McCalla as Connor
- Chelsea Kane Staub as Kameron

=== Introduced in season seven ===
- Eddie McGee as Frank
- Daniel Roebuck as Norman Peterson
- Romy Rosemont as Lola Peterson
- Rick Cosnett as Julian Enes
- Malcolm-Jamal Warner as Amir Casey
- Brian Thompson as Vincent Gerrard
- Devin Kelley as Kim

=== Introduced in season eight ===
- Abigail Spencer as Amber Braeburn
- Danny Nucci as Rick Romero
- Paula Marshall as Helena Diaz
- Lesley Ann Warren as Ann Hutchinson
- Sean O'Bryan as Charlie Nash
- George DelHoyo as Ramon Diaz

=== Introduced in season nine ===
- Mark Consuelos as Tripp Hauser
- Fallon Heaslip as Abigail
- Ashwin Gore as Jamal Momed
- Alex Loynaz as Terry Flores
- Briana Venskus-Vazquez as Dawn
- Richard Brooks as Chief Simpson
- June Diane Raphael as Tricia Benoit
- Geoff Pierson as Lewis Kern
- Rio Mangini as Parker Straiton
- Layla Alizada as Naomi Stanton
