= Arianna Hernandez =

Fictional character from Days of Our Lives

- Days of Our Lives character
- Lindsay Hartley as Arianna Hernandez
- Portrayed by: Felisha Terrell (2009); Lindsay Hartley (2009–10)
- Duration: 2009–10
- First appearance: April 15, 2009
- Last appearance: November 8, 2010
- Created by: Dena Higley and Christopher Whitesell
- Introduced by: Ken Corday and Gary Tomlin
In-universe information
- Occupation: Pub waitress; Pub manager; Undercover agent; Production assistant
- Parents: Eduardo Hernandez; Adriana Hernandez
- Brothers: Rafe Hernandez; Dario Hernandez
- Sisters: Gabi Hernandez
- Half-sisters: Paige Larson
- Aunts: Estrella
- Nieces: Arianna Horton

Arianna Hernandez is a fictional character from the American NBC soap opera Days of Our Lives, played by Lindsay Hartley. Arianna made her first appearance on April 15, 2009. In July 2009, it was announced that original actress Felisha Terrell had been axed from the soap and would be replaced by Lindsay Hartley. Hartley made her first appearance on August 28, 2009. In July 2010, it was announced that Hartley would be departing Days of our Lives and Arianna made her final appearance on November 8, 2010.

== Creation and development ==
In March 2009, it was announced that television newcomer Felisha Terrell had joined the cast of Days of our Lives as Arianna Hernandez, the sister of established character Rafe Hernandez (Galen Gering). Despite Terrell signing a three-year contract, it was announced in July 2009 that she had been axed from the soap and would be replaced by former Passions actress Lindsay Hartley. Hartley began filming her scenes on the July 23. She and Gering previously played siblings Theresa and Luis Lopez-Fitzgerald in Passions. Additionally, Eric Martsolf, the actor of Arianna's love interest Brady Black, also played Theresa's love interest, Ethan Winthrop, on Passions.

In July 2010, it was announced that Hartley had been axed from the soap, but would continue to appear throughout the summer months. In November 2010, Hartley told TV Guide magazine that she found the axing "tough", saying: "There was a period where I wasn't being used very much, where they had opportunities to go certain directions with my character and didn't, and it just wasn't happening. So I kind of had an idea that something was gonna go down." Hartley was told in a storyline meeting that Arianna would be killed off, a decision that left her "completely shocked, devastated".

== Storylines ==
Arianna first appears when Caroline Brady (Peggy McCay) hires her as a waitress at the Brady pub. She then moves to Salem and reconnects with her older brother, Rafe, whom she has been estranged from. She meets Rafe's girlfriend, Sami Brady (Alison Sweeney) and takes an instant dislike to her after she learns that Rafe resigned from the FBI for her. Arianna meets recovering drug addict Brady Black (Eric Martsolf) and takes a liking to him, but refuses his offer of a date, explaining that she has been in relationships with drug addicts in the past and does not want to again. Arianna later agrees to a date with Brady and they have a picnic in the park. They then begin a relationship.

Arianna uses the pub as a front to receive and sell drugs. Arianna meets Roman Brady (Josh Taylor) and is revealed to be working undercover for the Salem Police Department to find the root of drug distribution in Salem. Brady's grandfather, Victor Kiriakis (John Aniston) learns that Arianna is a drug dealer and forces her to end her relationship with Brady. She asks Roman if she can leave the investigation, but he says no. As time goes by EJ DiMera learns Arianna is working for him and he soon begins to favor Arianna over Troy (Erik Fellows) due to her selling more drugs. Jealous of Arianna moving up the ladder in the drug cartel and EJ warning Troy that Arianna would take his spot, Troy hires a hitman to kill Arianna. One day, the pub is closed due to Mickey Horton's death but Arianna decides to do inventory that day. Troy, who had been watching the pub, calls the hitman to take out Arianna. The hitman sneaks into the pub and tries to rob and kill Arianna, but Brady chases him off. After the hit fails, Troy decides to kill Arianna himself. Troy breaks into the pub when Arianna is alone and sneaks into her room to kill her, but EJ arrives and saves her. Troy is arrested for attempted murder and Arianna is taken off the investigation, but not before Troy notices Arianna speaking to Roman and realizes she is working undercover, he warns EJ that Arianna is a snitch. Brady, who is also at the police station, asks EJ what Troy is talking about and EJ pretends to have no idea and denies he has ever met Troy. The drug cartel storyline is then dropped.

Brady proposes marriage and Arianna accepts. They travel to the Dominican Republic to marry, but Brady's ex-girlfriend Nicole Walker (Arianne Zucker) follows them and attempts to reconcile with Brady. However, he refuses as he loves Arianna. A tropical storm stops the ceremony from taking place and they return to Salem. Nicole discovers that Richard Baker (John Callahan) is an associate of the Salem Mugger, who has been mugging several high-profile men. She makes him plant Arianna's hair at the crime scene. Arianna is then arrested and charged with multiple crimes. As she protests her innocence, Brady does not believe her and she ends their relationship. Lawyer EJ takes over Arianna's case and looks for evidence that Nicole framed her. Hope Brady (Kristian Alfonso) later confesses to the crimes after being under the influence of sleeping pills. Arianna overhears Sami confessing to shooting EJ and decides to tell him. She tells Rafe, who reveals that he already knows and supports Sami. Arianna agrees to meet with Sami to hear her side of the story. Sami explains why and when she shot EJ and Arianna video tapes her confession. After Arianna tells Sami that she is going to the police, Sami attacks her but she escapes. Sami calls her son Will Horton (Chandler Massey) and Rafe, telling them to stop Arianna. Will finds her at the pub and stops her telling EJ. Arianna runs away from Will onto the road, where she is hit by a car, and she dies in hospital days later from complications of the accident. After her death, Arianna's ghost haunts Sami with the truth about EJ's shooting.

Arianna's sister, Gabi, honors Arianna's memory by naming her daughter after her.

== Reception ==
With the recast to Hartley, Luke Kerr wrote for Daytime Confidential that she brought a smile to his face. He also commented that Arianna "became a whole lot more interesting".
