= Felisha Terrell =

American film and television actress

- Occupation: Actress
- Years active: 2008—present
- Children: 1

Felisha Terrell is an American film and television actress.

== Background ==
Terrell grew up in Chicago, Illinois. Her mother is white and her father is African American. She attended the University of Iowa and worked in pharmaceutical sales after graduation. In 2007, she relocated to Los Angeles to begin an acting career.

In 2009, Terrell had her first recurring role as Arianna Hernandez in the soap opera Days of Our Lives. She has had recurring roles on many television series, such as Marilyn Barnes on Ambitions, Detective Gwen Roberts on Tell Me a Story, Carlita on Shooter, Noelle Jasper on Just Add Magic, Isa Catalano on Survivor's Remorse, and Kali on Teen Wolf. A notable guest role was as "Alternate Michael" on Supernatural in 2018. She has also appeared in films including The Tomorrow War. In 2023, Terrell starred as Daphne Finch on the ABC series The Company You Keep. Though Terrell is biracial, her role on The Company You Keep was her first role as a biracial woman.

== Personal life ==
She has a son named Noah who was born in August 2017 and is dating Noah's father Donae Burston.

== Filmography ==
=== Film ===
Year	Title	Role	Notes
2008	Get Smart	CONTROL Assistant	
2010	The Social Network	Beautiful Woman	
2011	Pretty Wicked	Anna	Short
2014	We Got Next	Marissa	TV movie
2014	Expecting	Brayden	Short
2014	On Georgia's Mind	Charlie	Short
2014	The Lookalike	Drew	
2014	Fear Clinic	Osborn	
2017	A Violent Man	Angela	
2021	The Tomorrow War	Conscription Officer Paveza	

=== Television ===
Year	Title	Role	Notes
2008	Entourage	Carol	Episode: "Fantasy Island"
2009	Days of Our Lives	Arianna Hernandez	Regular role
2013	CSI: Crime Scene Investigation	Competitive Reporter	Episode: "Dead Air"
2013	The Goodwin Games	Lucinda Hobbes	Episode: "Unaired Pilot"
2013	Teen Wolf	Kali	Recurring cast: Season 3
2014	Agents of S.H.I.E.L.D.	Emily Deville	Episode: "The Magical Place"
2014	NCIS: New Orleans	Navy Lt Adele 'Addie' Watkins	Episode: "Breaking Brig" & "Stolen Valor"
2015	Survivor's Remorse	Isa Catalano	Recurring cast
2016	Roadside Picnic	Guta	Episode: "Pilot"
2017	Rosewood	Erin Given	Episode: "Benzodiazepine & the Benjamins"
2017	Lucifer	Courtney Sax	Episode: "Candy Morningstar"
2017–18	Just Add Magic	Nöelle Jasper	Recurring cast: season 2
2018	Shooter	Carlita Cruise	Recurring cast: season 3
2018	Supernatural	Michael	Episode: "The Spear"
2019	Ambitions	Marilyn Barnes	Recurring cast
2019-20	Tell Me a Story	Detective Gwen Roberts	Recurring cast: season 2
2020	Utopia	Hailey Alvez	Recurring cast
2021	BMF	Commander Mars	Recurring cast
2021	Queens	Tina Dubois	Recurring cast
2022	Dynasty	Nina	Recurring cast: season 5
2023	The Company You Keep	Daphne	Main role
2025	Matlock	Tina	2 episodes
2025	Nobody Wants This	Helena Estabrook	Episode: "A Better Rabbi"
2026	Cape Fear	Mara Rawlins	Recurring cast
