= 9-1-1 (franchise) =

American media franchise

- Created by: Ryan Murphy; Brad Falchuk; Tim Minear
- Original work: 9-1-1
- Owner: 20th Television
- Years: since 2018

Films and television
- Television series: 9-1-1; 9-1-1: Lone Star; 9-1-1: Nashville

Miscellaneous
- Related TV series: Doctor Odyssey

9-1-1 is an American procedural drama TV franchise created by Ryan Murphy, Brad Falchuk, and Tim Minear. The franchise focuses on the lives and careers of first responders—police officers, paramedics, firefighters, and dispatchers—who navigate high-pressure emergencies alongside their often-complex personal lives.

The original series, 9-1-1, premiered on Fox on January 3, 2018, and was followed by a spinoff, 9-1-1: Lone Star, which debuted on January 19, 2020, and ended on February 3, 2025. A third series, 9-1-1: Nashville, debuted on October 9, 2025, and is ongoing. The franchise is known for its dramatic portrayals of emergency scenarios ranging from everyday crises to large-scale disasters.

== Television series ==
=== Overview ===
Series	Television seasons									
Series	2017–18	2018–19	2019–20	2020–21	2021–22	2022–23	2023–24	2024–25	2025–26	2026–27
Series	Franchise									
9-1-1	1	2	3	4	5	6	7	8	9	10
9-1-1: Lone Star			1	2	3	4		5		
9-1-1: Nashville									1	2
	Universe									
Doctor Odyssey								1		

=== 9-1-1 (2018–present) ===
9-1-1 premiered on January 3, 2018, on Fox. Set in Los Angeles, it follows firefighters from Station 118 of the Los Angeles Fire Department, members of the Los Angeles Police Department, and 9-1-1 dispatchers. The show moved from Fox to ABC beginning with its seventh season in 2024. The cast was originally headed by Angela Bassett, Peter Krause, and Connie Britton for its first season. Oliver Stark, Aisha Hinds, Kenneth Choi, and Rockmond Dunbar rounded out the main cast. Britton departed after the first season and was replaced by Jennifer Love Hewitt for the second season. Ryan Guzman joined the main cast at the start of the season, with Corinne Massiah and Marcanthonee Jon Reis being promoted to series regulars. Gavin McHugh was added to the main cast for the third season. John Harlan Kim joined the main cast for the fourth season after debuting in the previous season, but later was demoted for the following season. Dunbar also left the series midway into the fifth season, while Reis also stopped appearing in the same season. Reis would later be replaced by Elijah M. Cooper in the seventh season. Krause exited the series after eight seasons. Massiah returned to the main cast in the ninth season, with Cooper also being promoted.

=== 9-1-1: Lone Star (2020–2025) ===
9-1-1: Lone Star debuted on January 19, 2020. Set in Austin, Texas, it follows New York firefighter Owen Strand (played by Rob Lowe) who relocates to rebuild a firehouse following a tragedy. The spin-off has been noted for its inclusion of LGBTQ+ and transgender characters in lead roles, receiving the GLAAD Media Award for Outstanding Drama Series. The series concluded with the fifth season on February 3, 2025. The series was originally headed by Lowe and Liv Tyler. Ronen Rubinstein, Sierra McClain, Jim Parrack, Natacha Karam, Brian Michael Smith, Rafael L. Silva, and Julian Works completed the cast for the first season. Tyler exited the series after the first season and was replaced with Gina Torres. Brianna Baker, Kelsey Yates and Skyler Yates were promoted to the main cast after recurring in their previous appearances. McClain exited the series ahead of the fifth and final season. Jackson Pace was promoted to a series regular for fifth season after previously appearing as a guest star.

=== 9-1-1: Nashville (2025–present) ===
In February 2025, ABC announced the order of 9-1-1: Nashville. Starring Chris O'Donnell as Fire Captain Don Hart, the show aired on ABC during the American 2025–2026 TV season. Similarly with 9-1-1: Lone Star, 9-1-1: Nashville features a father/son dynamic, with Captain Hart's son also being a firefighter on the show. The series is headed by O'Donnell and Jessica Capshaw, along with Kimberly Williams-Paisley and LeAnn Rimes. Actors Michael Provost, Juani Feliz, Hailey Kilgore, and Hunter McVey rounded off the cast. Ahead of the second season, Ryan Phillippe joined as a series regular.

== Recurring cast and characters ==
Character	Portrayed by	Franchise			Universe
Character	Portrayed by	9-1-1	9-1-1: Lone Star	9-1-1: Nashville	Doctor Odyssey
Evan "Buck" Buckley	Oliver Stark	Main	Special Guest	Guest	
Edmundo "Eddie" Diaz	Ryan Guzman	Main	Special Guest	Guest	
Athena Grant-Nash	Angela Bassett	Main	Special Guest		Special Guest
Henrietta "Hen" Wilson	Aisha Hinds	Main	Special Guest		
Howard "Chimney" Han	Kenneth Choi	Main		Guest	
Cammie Raleigh	Kimberly Williams-Paisley	Guest		Main	
