= 9-1-1: Nashville =

American television series (2025–present)

- Genre: Procedural drama
- Created by: Ryan Murphy; Tim Minear; Rashad Raisani
- Starring: Chris O'Donnell; Jessica Capshaw; Kimberly Williams-Paisley; LeAnn Rimes; Michael Provost; Juani Feliz; Hailey Kilgore; Hunter McVey; Ryan Phillippe
- Country of origin: United States
- Original language: English
- No. of seasons: 2
- No. of episodes: 24

Production
- Executive producers: Ryan Murphy; Tim Minear; Rashad Raisani; Brad Falchuk; Angela Bassett; Chris O'Donnell; Bradley Buecker
- Camera setup: Single-camera
- Running time: 42–45 minutes
- Production companies: Ryan Murphy Television; User Error Productions; 20th Television

Original release
- Network: ABC
- Release: October 9, 2025 – present

Related
- 9-1-1; 9-1-1: Lone Star

9-1-1: Nashville is an American procedural drama television series which premiered on ABC on October 9, 2025. It is the second spin-off of the 9-1-1 franchise, following 9-1-1: Lone Star, which concluded in February 2025. The series is created by Ryan Murphy, Tim Minear, and Rashad Raisani, with Brad Falchuk and Angela Bassett also serving as executive producers.

In March 2026, the series was renewed for a second season which premiered on October 15, 2026.

== Premise ==
As with 9-1-1, the series follows the personal and professional lives of first responders and 911 dispatchers. The series primarily follows the staff of Station 113 of the Nashville Fire Department and their families, including Captain Donald "Don" Hart (Chris O'Donnell), his wealthy wife Blythe (Jessica Capshaw), Cammie Raleigh (Kimberly Williams-Paisley)—a Nashville 911 dispatcher who is Blythe's sister-in-law, and Don's ex Dixie Bennings (LeAnn Rimes)—an aspiring singer who is the mother of a 113 cadet.

== Cast and characters ==
=== Main ===
- Chris O'Donnell as Captain Donald "Don" Hart, a veteran firefighter and rodeo rider who leads the 113 Nashville firehouse with his son Ryan
- Jessica Capshaw as Blythe Hart, Don's wife and Ryan's mother, who comes from wealth
- Kimberly Williams-Paisley as Cammie Raleigh, a 911 dispatcher, Blythe's sister-in-law. Her late husband was Blythe's brother.
- LeAnn Rimes as Dixie Bennings, Blue's mother and Don's ex-girlfriend, who is a singer
- Michael Provost as Ryan Hart, Don and Blythe's son, who is a firefighter lieutenant and a "modern-day cowboy"
- Juani Feliz as Roxie Alba, a firefighter who is an adrenaline junkie and a former trauma surgeon
- Hailey Kilgore as Taylor Thompson, a firefighter at the 113 firehouse who is also a singer
- Hunter McVey as Blue Bennings, a "haunted bad-boy" type and stripper who becomes a firefighter cadet at the 113 firehouse after helping a crashed party bike. He is Don and Dixie's son, and Ryan's half-brother.
- Ryan Phillippe as Rogue Kelly (season 2), a detective from New York who is investigating a series of crimes wreaking havoc on Nashville

=== Recurring ===
- Gregory Alan Williams as Harold Foster, the chief of the Nashville Fire Department
- MacKenzie Porter as Samantha "Sam" Hart, an ER doctor and Ryan's wife
- Tim Matheson as Edward Raleigh, Blythe’s wealthy father and a city council member
- Camryn Mamheim as Marcia Zellner (season 2), a clinical psychologist and a dispatch manager who has a tedious relationship with Cammie following the death of her son.

=== Guest stars ===
- Kane Brown as himself (season 1)
- Oliver Stark as Evan "Buck" Buckley (season 1-2), a firefighter from the LAFD 118
- Ryan Guzman as Edmundo "Eddie" Diaz (season 1), a firefighter from the LAFD 118 and Buck's best friend
- Kenneth Choi as Howard "Chimney" Han (season 2), a fire captain from the LAFD 118
- Adhir Kalyan as Stuart Pearson (season 1)
- Julie Clairvallais as Jacqueline (season 1)
- Kristin Cavallari as herself (season 1)
- Anna Akana as Elena (season 1)
- Freddie O'Connell as himself (season 1)
- Anna Lore as Tilda (season 1)
- Noah Cyrus as herself (season 1)
- Russell Dickerson as himself (season 2)

== Episodes ==
=== Series overview ===
Season	Episodes	Originally released	
Season	Episodes	First released	Last released
1	18	October 9, 2025	May 7, 2026
2	6	October 15, 2026	November 19, 2026

=== Season 1 (2025–26) ===
No. overall	No. in season	Title	Directed by	Written by	Original release date	Prod. code	U.S. viewers (millions)
1	1	"Pilot"	Bradley Buecker	Ryan Murphy & Tim Minear & Rashad Raisani	October 9, 2025	1JUM01	3.75
Rodeo rider Don Hart is the captain of Station 113, which he runs with son Ryan. They run into Don's secret son, Blue, to whom Don offers a job. Blue's mother, former back-up singer Dixie Bennings, hatches a scheme to get revenge on Don for staying with his wife, Blythe, and to get money for her vocal polyps surgery.
2	2	"Hell and High Water"	Bradley Buecker	Ryan Murphy & Tim Minear & Rashad Raisani	October 16, 2025	1JUM02	3.18
Ryan's wife, Sam, announces she wants a divorce to Ryan directly in front of Taylor and Roxie. Cammie telophonically helps deliver a baby. Ryan gives Blue a tour of the station. The 113 responds to a man stuck on top of a water tower because of an intense storm in Nashville. They successfully get the man down, but in the aftermath Don is brutally struck by lightning. The 113 rushes Don to the hospital. Inside, Ryan awkwardly reunites with Sam. The bickering with Don's former wife, Dixie, and Don's current wife Blythe continues, and the storm tearing Nashville apart continues to spread across the city.
3	3	"Forces of Nature"	Bradley Buecker	Ryan Murphy & Tim Minear & Rashad Raisani	October 23, 2025	1JUM03	3.02
The crew grapple with emotions as Don lies comatose in the hospital, but are soon called to the site of a tornado that touched down near an Airstream trailer, where Blue and Ryan have to work together. After encountering Dixie visiting Don in his hospital room, Blythe kicks her out and has an emotional moment with Don, and he regains consciousness. The tornado is discovered to have lifted the trailer in the air and left it hanging from the Korean War Veterans Memorial Bridge, with a young boy trapped inside. Ryan ascends to rescue the boy, but does not have enough length of safety rope to reach him and the boy is trapped behind a refrigerator. Don, having left the hospital against medical advice, arrives on the scene and gives Ryan advice over the radio as the trailer is about to fall. Ryan ties off his safety rope to the refrigerator, and he and the boy climb on the refrigerator as the trailer plummets to the deck of the bridge, and then brought down safely, with the boy reunited with his family and Ryan reunited with Don and the rest of the crew. Blythe later visits Dixie and they have a tense exchange about Don.
4	4	"Bad Case of the Blues"	Chad Lowe	Jamie Kessler	October 30, 2025	1JUM04	3.03
During a rescue at a water park, Blue performs a daring maneuver that quickly goes viral online. Blue's viral stunt prompts the crew to thoroughly test his knowledge as he prepares for his upcoming firefighter exam. Worried about Dixie's sudden reappearance in Don's life, Blythe hires a private investigator. While digging into Dixie, the investigator discovers a redacted criminal record for Blue involving grand larceny and extortion. Desperate for answers, Blythe convinces Cammie to put the old 9-1-1 call records associated with Blue's arrest. The audio reveals that a younger blue had threatened a street racer to extort $30,000, but only to pay for a friend's severe medical bills after a hit-and-run. Learning his motivations were altruistic, Blythe realizes Blue is fundamentally a good person.
5	5	"Lost Children"	Tessa Blake	Jim Garvey	November 6, 2025	1JUM05	3.33
Blue is taking his firefighter exam, but at the finish line, his anger towards Don and Dixie boils over and he storms out, refusing to talk with his parents. Even Ryan is unable to convince him. Emergencies include a desperate father abducting his children and threatening to kill them along with himself and a Jane Doe discovered by pair of fishermen. Finally, as Blue tries to get his old job back, he notices a drunken woman entering a car. He goes after her and calls 911. The woman passes out on the wheel and is about to hit children crossing the street. Blue drives in front of the car to stop it, causing his car to flip over and catch fire. 113 extract Blue out of the car, and in the hospital he opens to Don and Dixie and Don informs him his brave act and that he basically completed the exam, allowed him to officially join Nashville fire department.
6	6	"Good Southern Manors"	Chad Lowe	Marta Gené Camps	November 13, 2025	1JUM06	2.70
The 113 respond to a fire at Don's father-in-law Edward's distillery. In the aftermath, Chief Foster asks Don to convince Edward to pay the department's budget cuts, but Edward will only do so if Blue is fired. Meanwhile at the call center, Cammie comes into conflict with corporate consultant Ariella Kinsey. They eventually reach an understanding after Cammie saves a choking woman, and Cammie reveals that she became a dispatcher when her husband died due to 9-1-1 sending her to voicemail while he was choking. Shortly after, hackers take control of Nashville and demand a ransom of $10 million, leading to Blythe falling off her horse and getting caught in barbed wire.
7	7	"You've Been Boarded"	John J. Gray	Tyler Hisel	January 8, 2026	1JUM07	2.89
At a public meeting, the city council agree not to pay the ransom despite Don's objections. The 113 manage to stop the hackers from crashing a boat, but the ransom is then increased to $15 million. When Don can't get in touch with Blythe, he tracks her down and takes her to the hospital, with Edward thanking him. When the hackers take control of city council members' medical devices during a press conference, Cammie realizes that the hackers only targeted those who said no to paying the ransom, and she and FBI Agent Nick Turner realize that the hackers are inside the call center.
8	8	"All Hands"	Marita Grabiak	Britt Wilkinson	January 15, 2026	1JUM08	3.37
Cammie realizes that Ariella's assistant Tilda is working with the hacker and subdues her with pepper spray, but Tilda cannot stop the next attack. The hacker causes a major car crash by taking control of traffic lights and increases the ransom to $20 million. When the 113 arrive at the hospital, they have to reboot the power after the hacker shuts it down. This inspires Edward to pay both the ransom and the fire department's budget cuts. In the aftermath, the hacker is caught by Interpol, and Turner invites Cammie to a grief group.
9	9	"Pipe Dreams"	Yangzom Brauen	Eli Talbert	January 22, 2026	1JUM09	3.72
At a doctor's appointment, Dixie learns that her polyps are getting worse. During Blue's celebration party for becoming an official probationary firefighter, Dixie starts coughing up blood while singing with Taylor. At the hospital, Don decides to give Dixie the money for her surgery, but Blythe is angry when he doesn't consult her about it first. Later, the 113 respond to an emergency in which a woman deliberately crashes her car in order to cover up murdering her husband. This leads Blue to deduce that his mother faked coughing up blood in order to trick Don into giving her the money, but Dixie gaslights Blue into thinking she did it for his own good. Meanwhile, Ryan wants to have kids, but Sam is not ready. He eventually decides to adopt a kitten that was found in a tractor during a call, and discovers that Sam has adopted a dog.
10	10	"Let It R.I.P."	Keith Tripler	Alie Turfe	January 29, 2026	1JUM10	3.85
Blue develops feelings for Taylor, but Ryan and Roxie tell him not to pursue it. He later sees her with a cop named Jalen who he thinks is Taylor's boyfriend, but Taylor reveals that Jalen is just her roommate and is gay, and implies that she's interested in Blue as well. Meanwhile, Don receives a letter from Andrew Clarke, the man who started the fire that killed his family when he was a child, who wants Don to attend his parole hearing. Cammie starts attending a grief group, and after a call at a baseball pitch, she decides to delete Mark's voicemail that she frequently listens to.
11	11	"Don Begins"	Chad Lowe	Jamie Kessler	February 26, 2026	1JUM11	3.29
When Don is a child, a fire at his house kills his parents and his sister, and he meets Dixie and her grandmother at the hospital in the aftermath. Several decades later, Don is training to become a firefighter when he reunites with Dixie in a jail cell and they start a relationship, but they break up when she goes on a tour with Faith Hill. Don later starts dating Blythe after responding to a fire at her barn, much to Dixie's fury. In the present day, Don decides to attend Andrew Clarke's parole hearing after some persuasion from Dixie and the 113 responding to an accident in which a woman is struck by a truck but chooses to forgive the driver before she dies. He sees that Andrew is truly remorseful and decides to forgive him.
12	12	"Spirit of the Games"	Dawn Wilkinson	Rashad Raisani	March 5, 2026	1JUM16	3.41
Nashville hosts the American Firefighting Games, featuring teams from cities such as Boston, Kenosha, and Los Angeles. The Los Angeles team is represented by Evan "Buck" Buckley and Eddie Diaz from the 118. Ryan and Don are initially slated to represent Nashville, but Blue is forced to step in to replace Don on short notice after he injures his hand while training. During the ensuing events, the Los Angeles and Nashville teams develop a bitter rivalry, Boston's team constantly tries to cheat, while the Kenosha team are underdogs who don't take the competition as seriously because they've never done well. In the partner relay event, Kenosha team member Carl pulls a hamstring and collapses, prompting Ryan and Buck to set aside their differences and help him across the finish line; this results in Kenosha winning the race, while Los Angeles and Nashville tie for first in the final standings and agree to share the championship. This is the conclusion of a two-part crossover that began on 9-1-1.
13	13	"Small Potatoes"	John J. Gray	Jim Garvey	March 12, 2026	1JUM13	3.26
The team helps a father and his daughter dangling in their car on a cliff. Later, the father comes into the firehouse to offer Taylor the opportunity to work with a famous producer, Victoria Vamp. On another call, Roxie and Taylor help a teenage girl with removing a potato growing in her vagina. The parents of the teenager try to sue Roxie. A third call comes in of a man falling from scaffolding and damaging his spine. After creative differences, Taylor chooses to not work with Victoria. Finally, at the court hearing, Roxie helps the teenage girl after assessing that she is suffering from an ectopic pregnancy and her parents drop all charges.
14	14	"Hard Knox"	Christine Khalafian	Annie Fawke	March 19, 2026	1JUM12	3.49
Blythe is holding her annual equine therapy for firefighters, but her headliner drops out, so Blue suggests his mother to fill in. On a call to an accountant’s office, the team discovers that the manager has been sitting dead at her desk for days with no one noticing. Ryan and Sam decide to go to Knoxville for the weekend after their couples therapist suggest they spend more time together. While at the gala, Dixie gets horribly drunk and ends up spending the night at Don and Blythe’s manor to sleep it off, where she reveals she got pregnant on purpose to make Don stay.
15	15	"Bad Girls"	Yangzom Brauen	Marta Gené Camps	March 26, 2026	1JUM14	4.02
A makeup influencer, Elena, is working with Kristin Cavallari on a product rollout when a face mask gets stuck to her face. The team works together to rescue her and is thanked with PR packages. Ryan wants to surprise Sam at work with the makeup, but she has lied about being at work and has turned her location services off on her phone. On another call, a wife pushes her husband off a ladder because she thinks he is cheating on her, accidentally sending him through a window. Impaled on the broken glass, he reveals that he was not and has been truthful. The team also responds to a house fire; dispatch informs them that the house has one resident, a woman named Susan. Susan mentions that she has a son, Jared. Upon re-entering the house in search of her son, they find a grown, malnourished man, who reveals to the team that he has been locked up for a long time. It's also revealed that Jared started the fire to escape his mother. Elena DMs Roxie, and they possibly go on a date. Ryan confronts Sam about her whereabouts, and she reveals she has a deformity in her uterus and is pregnant. Dixie gives an ultimatum to Blue about his birthday party and kicks him out of the house when Blue decides to go to Don and Blythe's for his birthday.
16	16	"Love to Death"	John J. Gray	Eli Talbert	April 2, 2026	1JUM15	3.34
Cammie receives a call from a man who believes someone is breaking into his ex-wife's Vera's home, but Taylor and Roxie arrive too late to save Vera who has been stabbed. With help from Turner, Cammie discovers that Vera was murdered by her sister Aubrey, who now intends to murder her niece Olivia so she can get her hands on Vera's fortune. The 113 rescue Olivia and Jalen arrests Aubrey, and Cammie and Turner go out for drinks. Meanwhile, Blue is upset when Dixie doesn't attend his birthday party. Taylor meets Dixie at a cafe, and tells how hurt her son is. Dixie then makes up with Blue, and supports his relationship with Taylor.
17	17	"Saboteurs"	John J. Gray	Jim Garvey & Jamie Kessler	April 30, 2026	1JUM17	3.07
Dixie gets advice from her grandmother and writes a diss-track about Blythe. The 113 responds to a woman choking on an engagement ring. On another call, the men who were dynamite fishing in a previous episode sabotage the break lines on a fork lift which starts crushing one of their coworkers. Roxie keeps sabotaging her meetings and dates with Elena. The last call of the episode finds an obese man who has fallen and can't get up. He later has a dire emergency, one eventually the 113 clears up. Dixie’s song comes between Blythe and Don’s marriage as she keeps making songs about an anonymous woman.
18	18	"Intrusive Thoughts"	Chad Lowe	Rashad Raisani & Marta Gené Camps	May 7, 2026	1JUM18	3.30
Noah Cyrus is rehearsing for an upcoming concert and the whole crew collapses from chlorine gas. Blue is moving into a new apartment. Sam goes for her 10-week checkup and learns that she has a tumor growing. Blythe drives herself mad trying to figure out who is spilling secrets. Cammie talks a woman out of jumping off a bridge. The crew responds to a runaway lawn mower and a woman holding it back to stop it from running over her baby, horribly burning her hands in the process. Blythe goes to confront Dixie and they get into a physical fight.

=== Season 2 (2026) ===
No. overall	No. in season	Title	Directed by	Written by	Original release date	Prod. code	U.S. viewers (millions)
19	1	"Going Rogue"	Chad Lowe	Ryan Murphy & Brad Falchuk & Rashad Raisani	October 15, 2026	2JUM01	3.55
The 113 responds to a call at the museum when a swarm of murder hornets attack several patrons and lock them inside the gallery. The 113 meets Rogue Kelly, a homicide detective recently transferred from New York, who discovers the hornets were planted and released intentionally by someone quoting plagues from the Bible. Dixie and Blythe attend anger management as part of their plea deals, and Blythe tells Don her anger at Dixie is actually misplaced anger towards him and suggests they sleep in separate rooms. Ryan and Sam keep her pregnancy a secret, and Don is not happy when Rogue exposes his and Blythe's separation. When a building's basement is flooded with animal blood (from a nearby butcher shop), the 113 rescues the woman trapped inside, and Don and Rogue discover that it's the same perpetrator who planted the murder hornets when they find another Bible page.
20	2	"Boys and Boils"	John J. Gray	Ryan Murphy & Brad Falchuk & Rashad Raisani	October 22, 2026	2JUM02	3.52
The 113 responds to a similar call that the 118 in L.A. once had, and call Buck for help. Don is jealous over the fascination Ryan and the 113 have about Rogue. Cammie gets a call from the Bible killer, who calls himself "Pharaoh". He says that if first responders interfere with his plan, he will come after them. Soon after, a group of looksmaxxing influencers are targeted by Pharaoh, ending up covered in boils. Ryan helps Rogue discover the Bible passage that links the crime to Pharaoh. Rogue warns Don about Pharaoh's threat to first responders. Don tells Blythe about the threat, but she refuses to end their "bed divorce", and Don decides to sleep on a chair outside her room. Ryan is eager to help Rogue find Pharaoh, who calls and threatens Cammie on her personal cell, and says he has a much bigger plan for Nashville that she won't be able to thwart.
21	3	"Let There Be Darkness"	Yangzom Brauen	Marta Gené Camps	October 29, 2026	2JUM03	3.23
During a high pollen concentration, a delivery boy tries to hurry to his next destination, but his eyesight worsens. He crashes and gets his hands stuck into hot asphalt. 113 save him, but Roxie notices his eyes are all wrong, and it's not about the pollen. Blythe experiences the same with her eyesight at a shooting range, and many more victims are hospitalized by same symptomps, including a doctor in the middle of a heart transplant operation, forcing Sam with Roxie's help to finish the operation. A mother, with the same condition, tries to drive his son to a hospital, who had an asthma attack. Cammie directs her to 113, and mother is hospitalized. Rogue and Don determine this is Pharaoh's version of darkness, and Rogue determines all of the victims used the same brand of eye drops. Don meets the boy with asthma, and learns he is not experiencing symptomps despite having used same eye drops. Sam learns the antibiotic he's using, and Ryan and Blue race to Cincinnati to obtain the antibiotic. All except the first victim are cured. Rogue learns Pharaoh left a clue of his next attack in the pharmacy that sold the eye drops, with numbers 7-2-9. Dixie boards a flight to Milwaukee, numbered 729.
22	4	"In Cold Blood"	Chad Lowe	Jamie Kessler	November 5, 2026	2JUM04	3.56
Due to Blythe having bought Dixie's contract, she is forced to fly to Milwaukee to perform in a concert, and she boards the flight 729. Nashville dispatch center gets a new director of operations, who seems nice. Pharaoh had managed to smuggle a crate containing Egyptian cobras into flight 729, that opens with a timer. While Dixie bonds with Danny, 12-year old boy sitting next to her, snakes swarm the plane and many passengers get bitten. Dixie manages to help Danny after he gets bitten. Cammie suggests the plane's captain to lower the plane's inner temperature to force the snakes into hibernation. It works, but unfortunately they jam the plane's nose gear, forcing the plane to make a crash landing. 113 saves the plane and most of the passengers. Rogue discovers the crate was passed by an inspector currently in a coma, and acknowledges Ryan's early theory, that Pharaoh is using smugglers. Danny's father thanks Dixie and he arranges for her to perform live. She sings her diss-track about Blythe, renewing their animosity.
23	5	"Ding-Dong-Ditch"	John J. Gray	Jim Garvey	November 12, 2026	2JUM05	3.62
24	6	"Tears of the Nile"	Keith Tripler	Alie Turfe	November 19, 2026	2JUM06	TBD

== Production ==
=== Development ===
Following the conclusion of 9-1-1: Lone Star, ABC announced a straight-to-series order for 9-1-1: Nashville in February 2025. The decision to set the series in Nashville was influenced by the city's distinctive musical culture and scenic setting. On March 5, 2026, ABC renewed the series for a second season.

=== Casting ===
On March 17, 2025, Chris O'Donnell was announced to be starring in the series. The following month, Jessica Capshaw had joined the cast. In May 2025, LeAnn Rimes and Kimberly Williams-Paisley were added to the cast. In June 2025, Hailey Kilgore, Michael Provost, Juani Feliz and Hunter McVey were announced as series regulars. In August 2025, Gregory Alan Williams, MacKenzie Porter, and Tim Matheson joined cast in recurring capacities.

On April 20, 2026, Ryan Phillippe joined the cast as a series regular for the second season.

== Release ==
9-1-1: Nashville premiered on ABC on October 9, 2025, and is available to stream the next day on Hulu. The second season premiered on October 15, 2026. In Canada, the series airs on CTV and is available to stream the next day on either Disney+ via Hulu or Crave.

== Reception ==
=== Critical response ===
Joel Keller of Decider appreciated that 9-1-1: Nashville embraces its absurdity, starting with a tornado-related emergency and placing characters in improbable situations, and complimented the show for being "entertainingly silly," noting that the 9-1-1 franchise's willingness to be ridiculous gives it freedom to explore unusual scenarios. Aramide Tinubu of Variety emphasized that 9-1-1: Nashville maintains the franchise's mix of emergency action and character-driven drama, highlighting the tornado and other crises alongside family tensions in the Hart household. He noted the series' fast pace, engaging plot turns, and feel-good moments of people helping each other, and said that the show delivers what franchise fans expect, adding a "country flair" and new characters.

=== Ratings ===
The premiere of 9-1-1: Nashville drew 12.4 million total viewers across ABC, Hulu, Hulu on Disney+, and digital platforms after seven days, marking a 231% increase from its same-day audience of 3.75 million, according to Nielsen Media Research. Excluding encore broadcasts, the episode reached 7.8 million viewers, representing a 108% gain from the same-day figure, and earned a 1.51 rating among adults aged 18–49. On streaming, 9-1-1: Nashville ranked as ABC's second-highest drama premiere after seven days, behind High Potential. After 35 days, total viewership rose to 19.29 million, with 10.44 million excluding encores, and a 2.15 rating among adults 18–49, ranking the series as the No. 1 new broadcast series in that demographic.

The January 29 episode of 9-1-1: Nashville drew its largest multi-platform audience since the series premiere, with 6.99 million viewers after seven days of viewing across ABC, Hulu, Hulu on Disney+, and other digital platforms. The episode achieved a 1.09 rating among adults aged 18–49, representing a 241% increase from its live-plus-same-day rating, while total viewership rose by 82% over the same period. On linear broadcast alone, the episode also set a series high, with 5.79 million viewers and a 0.59 rating in the 18–49 demographic.

Viewership and ratings per episode of 9-1-1: Nashville
No.	Title	Air date	Rating/share (18–49)	Viewers (millions)	DVR (18–49)	DVR viewers (millions)	Total (18–49)	Total viewers (millions)	Ref.
1	"Pilot"	October 9, 2025	0.3/3	3.75	0.13	1.45	0.42	5.20	
2	"Hell and High Water"	October 16, 2025	0.2/3	3.18	0.17	1.69	0.40	4.87	
3	"Forces of Nature"	October 23, 2025	0.3/3	3.02	0.15	1.62	0.41	4.64	
4	"Bad Case of the Blues"	October 30, 2025	0.3/3	3.03	0.12	1.28	0.39	4.32	
5	"Lost Children"	November 6, 2025	0.3/3	3.33	0.09	0.96	0.34	4.29	
6	"Good Southern Manors"	November 13, 2025	0.2/3	2.70	N/A	N/A	N/A	N/A	
