= Doctor Odyssey =

2024 American medical drama TV series

- Genre: Medical drama
- Created by: Ryan Murphy & Jon Robin Baitz & Joe Baken
- Starring: Joshua Jackson; Phillipa Soo; Sean Teale; Don Johnson
- Music by: Julia Newman
- Country of origin: United States
- Original language: English
- No. of seasons: 1
- No. of episodes: 18

Production
- Executive producers: Laura Lyn Greene; Richard Levine; Eric Paquette; Don Johnson; Joshua Jackson; Paris Barclay; Nissa Diederich; Scott Robertson; Eric Kovtun; Joe Baken; Jon Robin Baitz; Alexis Martin Woodall; Ryan Murphy; Liz Friedman
- Producers: Byron Crawford; Franzis Müller; Donna Nitti; Tracy Taylor
- Cinematography: Simon Dennis; John Thomas Connor
- Editors: Franzis Müller; Travis Weaver; Thomas Mitchell; Ken Ramos; Shannon Baker Davis
- Running time: 41–43 minutes
- Production companies: Ryan Murphy Television; Scratchpad; 20th Television

Original release
- Network: ABC
- Release: September 26, 2024 – May 15, 2025

Related
- 9-1-1

Doctor Odyssey is an American medical drama television series that ran on ABC from September 26, 2024, to May 15, 2025. The series was created by Ryan Murphy, Jon Robin Baitz, and Joe Baken. It stars Joshua Jackson, Phillipa Soo, Don Johnson, and Sean Teale. In June 2025, the series was canceled by default, following the expiration of the main cast's options.

== Premise ==
Max, a new doctor on board a luxury cruise ship, and his small but capable team handle unique medical cases (and each other) far away from the nearest shore.

== Cast and characters ==
=== Main ===
- Joshua Jackson as Dr. Maxwell "Max" Bankman, an attending physician in internal medicine and a newly hired doctor on a luxury cruise ship known as The Odyssey
- Phillipa Soo as Nurse Avery Morgan, a nurse practitioner on The Odyssey
- Sean Teale as Nurse Tristan Silva, a nurse on The Odyssey who is secretly yearning to be with Avery
- Don Johnson as Captain Robert Massey, the captain of The Odyssey

=== Recurring ===
- Jacqueline Toboni as Rosie, The Odyssey's engineer
- Marcus Emanuel Mitchell as Spencer Monroe, the first officer of The Odyssey
- Rick Cosnett as Corey, the head of housekeeping on The Odyssey
- Laura Harrier as Vivian, the personal chef for Bethany Welles, who then becomes a chef on The Odyssey

=== Guest stars ===
- Rachel Dratch as Mrs. Rubens, Burt's wife
- Tom McGowan as Burt Rubens, Max's first patient on The Odyssey, who is diagnosed with iodine poisoning
- Shania Twain as Heather, a widow who strikes up a connection with Captain Massey
- Chord Overstreet as Sam, a young single guy who plays the field and is diagnosed with syphilis
- Gina Gershon as Lenore, the wife of the owner of the cruise ship
- Justin Jedlica as Ken, the real Ken doll
- Amy Sedaris as Bethany Welles, a wellness expert with a large following
- Margaret Cho as Judy, a wellness expert
- Kelsea Ballerini as Lisa, a bride-to-be who is having her wedding on The Odyssey
- Margo Martindale as Ellen, Lisa's mother
- John Stamos as Craig, Captain Massey's alcoholic younger brother who has been sober for 15 years
- Cheyenne Jackson as Bryan, Craig's significant other
- Caldwell Tidicue as Marsha, Craig's favorite drag queen
- Loretta Devine as Jill Manafort
- Angela Bassett as Athena Grant-Nash, a LAPD patrol sergeant from 9-1-1
- Jaclyn Smith as Delia, an older woman who is lying to her younger significant other about her cancer returning
- Donna Mills as Olivia, an older woman who tested positive for COVID-19 who refuses to follow Max's orders to quarantine

== Episodes ==
No.	Title	Directed by	Written by	Original release date	Prod. code	U.S. viewers (millions)
1	"Pilot"	Paris Barclay	Ryan Murphy & Jon Robin Baitz & Joe Baken	September 26, 2024	1LGV01	4.23
After the previous head medic was fired for a negligent bacterial outbreak onboard the Odyssey, new doctor Dr. Max Bankman meets nurse practitioner Avery Morgan and nurse Tristan Silva. Tristan reveals his love for Avery to Max while they and the ship's crew party on land. To make Tristan jealous, Max dances with Avery and they kiss; they nearly have sex, but realise it would be unprofessional. Max reveals to Avery that he was one of the first cases of COVID-19 in the US and nearly died from the virus, which made him realize he needed to enjoy life. Max and Tristan make peace. Emergencies include the team treating a man with iodide poisoning and later a dislocated shoulder, performing surgery on a man with a penile fracture, and a man who goes overboard.
2	"Singles Week"	Paris Barclay	Ryan Murphy & Jon Robin Baitz & Joe Baken	October 3, 2024	1LGV02	3.86
Tristan and Kelly, a young single woman, nearly have sex before Kelly collapses. The ship's Captain, Robert Massey, has a heart attack while dining with a widow. The crew discovers a life raft on the radar and diverts to it, rescuing a woman. Avery discovers Kelly's collapse was caused by her taking Thiazide. Tristan and Avery kiss while Max watches from afar. Sam, a promiscuous man, catches syphilis and writes down the names of his many sexual contacts onboard. Avery gets a scholarship for her MD from the Odyssey cruise line and can become the ship's doctor after three years of residency.
3	"Plastic Surgery Week"	Bradley Buecker	Ryan Murphy & Jon Robin Baitz & Joe Baken	October 10, 2024	1LGV03	3.76
Lenore Laurent, the wife of the ship's owner, books the ship out for clients of her many plastic surgery clinics. Tristan's mother arrives unannounced with a facelift. Avery feuds with Lenore, while Lenore flirts with the Captain. Max is fascinated with Ken (Justin Jedlica) and they do cryotherapy together. Lenore's assistant gets frostbite on her breast. Avery mocks Lenore and Lenore fires her. A woman snorts cocaine and her nose falls off. Ken dies in his sleep and Max unsuccessfully tries CPR. Tristan expresses his anger to his mother for her absence in his youth before she collapses. She is diagnosed with Huntington's disease. Max and Avery have sex. Lenore's assistant's implant becomes infected. Avery suggests surgery and it's successful. Tristan's mother leaves the ship at port, but doesn't return. Tristan tells Max he is no longer interested in Avery. Lenore gives Avery her recommendation for the scholarship.
4	"Wellness Week"	John J. Gray	Joe Baken & Byron Crawford	October 17, 2024	1LGV04	2.78
5	"Halloween Week"	Tessa Blake	Joe Baken & Byron Crawford	October 24, 2024	1LGV05	2.60
6	"I Always Cry At Weddings"	Paris Barclay	Ryan Murphy & Joe Baken	November 7, 2024	1LGV06	2.78
7	"Oh, Daddy!"	Crystle Roberson Dorsey	Joe Baken & Byron Crawford	November 14, 2024	1LGV07	2.60
8	"Quackers"	Maggie Kiley	Ryan Murphy & Jon Robin Baitz	November 21, 2024	1LGV08	3.09
9	"Shark Attack!"	Millicent Shelton	Mike Schaub & Liz Friedman	March 6, 2025	1LGV13	3.00
10	"Shark Attack! Part 2: Orca!"	Michael Medico	Russel Friend & Jamie Pachino	March 13, 2025	1LGV14	2.66
11	"Casino Week"	Jennifer Lynch	Teleplay by : Tracy Taylor & Jessica Grasl; Story by : Mike Schaub & Tracy Taylor	March 20, 2025	1LGV15	3.56
After chasing after a criminal, Athena Grant (Angela Bassett) is stuck on the ship, much to her annoyance, in the midst of Casino Week. As there is another criminal on board, she works with Max and Avery to find them. Meanwhile, Avery is suffering through pregnancy symptoms while she bonds with Athena and an older woman. Note: This episode concludes a crossover event that begins on 9-1-1 season 8 episode 11.
12	"Sophisticated Ladies Week"	Crystle Roberson Dorsey	Jon Robin Baitz & Joe Baken	March 27, 2025	1LGV10	3.46
13	"Spring Break"	Steven Canals	Ryan Murphy & Liz Friedman	April 3, 2025	1LGV11	2.92
14	"Hot Tub Week"	Paris Barclay	Jessica Grasl	April 10, 2025	1LGV12	2.75
Max, Avery, and Tristan navigate “Cheer Week” with a wide variety of college cheer squads on the Odyssey. After one of the lead cheerleaders is injured in a hot tub accident, auditions go underway to find a new flyer; when one of the candidates suffers from chronic insomnia, Max discovers that she is being spiked with ADHD medication by one of her friends and encourages the latter to admit the deception. Avery reaches enough weeks along in her pregnancy for Max and Tristan to take a paternity test. However, upon analyzing the results, she discovers she was never actually pregnant; it’s revealed she actually had an ovarian cyst that led to several false positives. A heartbroken Avery reveals the news to Max and Tristan and the three of them process their grief together. Meanwhile, Massey develops shingles due to the stress of his own impending fatherhood and finds closure with a flashback of his first wife.
15	"Crew Week"	Paris Barclay	Jamie Pachino & Jon Robin Baitz	April 17, 2025	1LGV09	2.49
16	"Double-Booked"	Our Lady J	Jamie Pachino & Russel Friend	May 1, 2025	1LGV16	2.78
17	"The Wave"	Maggie Kiley	Teleplay by : Jessica Grasl & Mike Schaub; Story by : Byron Crawford & Mike Schaub	May 8, 2025	1LGV17	2.52
18	"The Wave, Part 2"	Paris Barclay	Teleplay by : Joe Baken & Liz Friedman; Story by : Tracy Taylor	May 15, 2025	1LGV18	3.08

== Production ==
=== Development ===
On March 20, 2024, Doctor Odyssey was given a straight-to-series order by ABC. The series is created by Ryan Murphy, Jon Robin Baitz, and Joe Baken, who executive produce alongside Joshua Jackson, Paris Barclay, Eric Paquette, Alexis Martin Woodall, Eric Kovtun, Scott Robertson, and Nissa Diederich. Production companies involved with the series are 20th Television and Ryan Murphy Television. On June 27, 2025, the series was canceled by default after one season after the main cast's options expired. Per reports, should ABC decide to continue the series, new options would need to be secured.

=== Casting ===
Upon the straight-to-series order announcement, Jackson was cast to star. In April 2024, Don Johnson and Phillipa Soo joined the main cast in undisclosed roles. On May 2, 2024, Sean Teale was cast in an undisclosed starring role. In August 2024, a trailer for the series revealed Shania Twain making a guest appearance. The full official trailer was released in September 2024 and revealed additional guest stars that would be appearing throughout the series, including John Stamos and Kelsea Ballerini.

=== Filming ===
Filming was expected to have begun in Los Angeles in July 2024. First look images from the set were released to the press in August 2024. Some filming occurs at Rye Canyon Studios in Santa Clarita, California, with more filming occurring in Fillmore, California.

== Broadcast ==
Doctor Odyssey premiered on ABC on September 26, 2024. It was later made available to stream on Hulu. In Canada, the series airs on CTV and CTV Drama Channel, and is available to stream on Crave and Disney+ via Star.

== Reception ==
=== Critical response ===
The review aggregator website Rotten Tomatoes reported a 63% approval rating with an average rating of 5.2/10, based on 8 critic reviews. Metacritic, which uses a weighted average, assigned a score of 66 out of 100 based on 5 critics, indicating "generally favorable" reviews.

Matthew Creith of TheWrap found Joshua Jackson's portrayal of Dr. Max Bankman as an easygoing and charming doctor engaging and relatable, particularly as he adjusts to his new environment post-COVID. He praised the chemistry between Jackson and his co-star Phillipa Soo, saying it adds depth to their characters while navigating both medical emergencies and personal interactions. Creith noted that while the series starts strong, it trends toward a more surface-level exploration of the glamorous cruise lifestyle, prompting curiosity about how the show will develop throughout the season. Craig Mathieson of The Age gave Doctor Odyssey a score of three out of four stars, complimenting the show for its engaging blend of humor and drama, and likening it to Grey's Anatomy set on a cruise ship. He found the series to have a silly yet enjoyable tone, attributing this to the chemistry between the characters and the light-hearted storytelling. Mathieson said Jackson brings a charming presence to the role, showcasing both authority and a laid-back attitude. He also praised the creative team behind the show, noting that their collaboration results in a unique mix of influences, from comedic medical situations to a nostalgic nod to The Love Boat.

Joel Keller of Decider said that Doctor Odyssey aims to extend the formula of Murphy's 9-1-1 franchise to a medical drama set on the high seas. He praised the show's entertainment value, likening it to The Love Boat with its mix of guest stars, outrageous medical cases, and romantic tension among the characters. Keller praised the performances, particularly those of Jackson and Soo, noting their strong chemistry and Soo's confident portrayal of her character. However, he found some moments in the first episode, such as a lengthy monologue about COVID and a dramatic rescue scene, to be over-the-top. Joly Herman of Common Sense Media rated Doctor Odyssey three out of five stars, describing it as a soapy yet entertaining medical drama. She praised the series for its positive messages, pointing out the importance of integrity, teamwork, and understanding others' perspectives. Herman highlighted the strong characters who advocate for their principles and responsibilities. Despite its light-hearted approach, she found that the show effectively focuses on serious values, encouraging viewers to enjoy life while striving to be good people. Columnist Maurice Tougas dismissed the series as being "so ludicrous that it's almost watchable," finding the plots repetitive.

=== Ratings ===
Doctor Odyssey became ABC's most-watched drama debut in four years, drawing 7.59 million total viewers in live plus three-day viewing and securing a 0.38 rating in the 18–49 demo. It retained 87% of its lead-in audience and held the No. 1 spot on Hulu's "Top 15 Today" list for three consecutive days, remaining in that position as of September 30, 2024. The series later attracted 13.6 million cross-platform viewers in its first week, representing a 230% increase over its live + same-day audience of 4.13 million.

Viewership and ratings per episode of Doctor Odyssey
No.	Title	Air date	Rating/share (18–49)	Viewers (millions)	DVR (18–49)	DVR viewers (millions)	Total (18–49)	Total viewers (millions)	Ref.
1	"Pilot"	September 26, 2024	0.4/4	4.23	—N/a	—N/a	—N/a	—N/a	
2	"Singles Week"	October 3, 2024	0.3/3	3.86	—N/a	—N/a	—N/a	—N/a	
3	"Plastic Surgery Week"	October 10, 2024	0.4/4	3.76	—N/a	—N/a	—N/a	—N/a	
4	"Wellness Week"	October 17, 2024	0.3/3	2.78	0.2	1.85	0.4	4.62	
5	"Halloween Week"	October 24, 2024	0.2/2	2.60	0.2	1.76	0.4	4.36	
6	"I Always Cry at Weddings"	November 7, 2024	0.3/3	2.78	0.2	1.80	0.5	4.59	
7	"Oh, Daddy!"	November 14, 2024	0.2/2	2.60	0.2	1.63	0.4	4.23	
8	"Quackers"	November 21, 2024	0.3/3	3.08	0.2	1.60	0.4	4.70	
9	"Shark Attack!"	March 6, 2025	0.3/4	3.00	0.2	1.58	0.4	4.59	
10	"Shark Attack! Part 2: Orca!"	March 13, 2025	0.3/3	2.66	0.2	1.60	0.4	4.25	
11	"Casino Week"	March 20, 2025	0.2/3	3.56	0.2	1.63	0.4	5.19	
12	"Sophisticated Ladies Week"	March 27, 2025	0.3/3	3.46	TBD	TBD	TBD	TBD	
13	"Spring Break"	April 3, 2025	0.2/3	3.92	TBD	TBD	TBD	TBD	
14	"Hot Tub Week"	April 10, 2025	0.3/4	2.75	TBD	TBD	TBD	TBD	
15	"Crew Week"	April 17, 2025	0.2/3	2.49	TBD	TBD	TBD	TBD	
16	"Double Booked"	May 1, 2025	0.2/3	2.78	TBD	TBD	TBD	TBD	
17	"The Wave"	May 8, 2025	0.2/2	2.52	TBD	TBD	TBD	TBD	
18	"The Wave, Part 2"	May 15, 2025	0.2/3	3.08	TBD	TBD	TBD	TBD	

=== Accolades ===
Year	Award	Category	Nominee(s)	Result	Ref.
2025	Astra TV Awards	Best Actor in a Drama Series	Joshua Jackson	Nominated	
2025	Astra TV Awards	Best Guest Actor in a Drama Series	Cheyenne Jackson	Nominated	
2025	Astra TV Awards	Best Guest Actress in a Drama Series	Angela Bassett	Nominated	
2025	Make-Up Artist & Hair Stylists Guild Awards	Best Contemporary Makeup—Television Series, Limited Series or Miniseries, or Movie for Television	Sabrina Wilson, Michael Ornalez, Rochelle Uribe, Tracey Anderson, and Heather Galipo	Nominated	
