= Fire-fighting sport =

Sport using fire-fighting-related activities

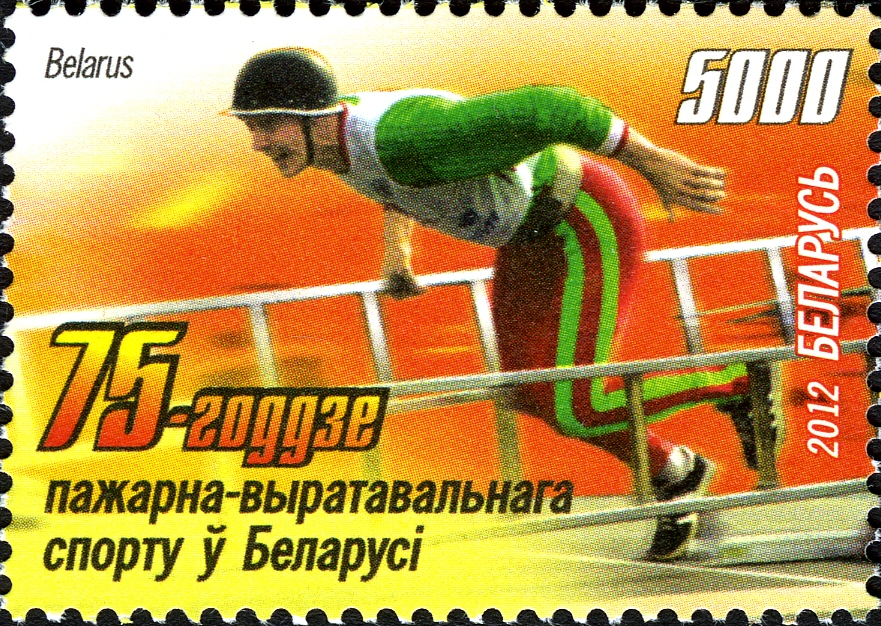
Fire-fighting sport on stamp of Belarus

Fire-fighting sport (Russian: пожарно-прикладной спорт) is a sport discipline developed in the Soviet Union in 1937. It includes a competition between various fire fighting teams in fire fighting-related exercises, such as climbing stairs in a mock-up house, unfolding a water hose, and extinguishing a fire using hoses or extinguishers. International competitions have taken place since 1968. The VII Worldwide Championship in Fire and Rescue Sports took place in Cottbus, Germany, from 31 August to 5 September 2011. First international competitions among juniors were conducted on 7–9 August 2010 in Kazan, Tatarstan. The next international junior contest was held in 2011 in Saint Petersburg.

== See also ==
- Czech fire sport
