= Most Guys Are Losers =

- Film poster
- Directed by: Eric Ustian
- Written by: Eric Ustian
- Based on: Most Guys Are Losers by Mark Berzins
- Produced by: Lene Amalfi; Eric Ustian; Mark Berzins
- Starring: Andy Buckley; Mira Sorvino; Michael Provost; Grace Fulton
- Cinematography: Evan Zissimopulos
- Edited by: Thales Corrêa
- Music by: Dan Martinez
- Production company: Pier Avenue Films
- Distributed by: Gravitas Ventures
- Release date: October 22, 2020 (Denver Film Festival)
- Running time: 88 minutes
- Country: United States
- Language: English

Most Guys Are Losers is a 2020 American comedy-drama film written and directed by Eric Ustian and starring Andy Buckley and Mira Sorvino. It is based on the novel of the same name by Mark Berzins.

== Plot ==
Over Thanksgiving weekend in Naperville, Illinois, Bo, a college kid from California, meets his girlfriend Sandy's family, including her father, a bar owner and author of the dating book Most Guys are Losers.

== Cast ==
- Andy Buckley as Mark
- Mira Sorvino as Amy
- Michael Provost as Bo
- Grace Fulton as Sandy
- Keith David as Al
- Paul Sorvino as Grandpa
- Belmont Cameli as Trevor
- Maryelizabeth O'Donnell as Gina
- Ace Rosas as Stephon

== Release ==
The film premiered virtually at the Denver Film Festival on October 22, 2020. In May 2022, it was announced that Gravitas Ventures acquired worldwide distribution to the film, which was released in theaters and on VOD on November 25, 2022.

== Reception ==
Richard Roeper of the Chicago Sun-Times gave the film 3 out of 4 stars, calling it "a predictable tale that wins us over with breezy style and some familiar faces." Liam Trump of Film Threat gave the film a 3 out of 10.
