= Tom Costantino =

American television and film editor

- Born: 1971
- Occupation(s): Television editor, film editor

Tom Costantino is an American television and film editor. Tom Costantino was born in 1971 in the United States. Costantino is also a member of the American Cinema Editors society. His most recent work includes Fox's 9-1-1 and The Orville created by Seth MacFarlane. The pilot was directed by Jon Favreau.
