= Famous Last Words (TV series) =

American television series

- Genre: Documentary
- Based on: Det sidste ord by Mikael Bertelsen
- Directed by: Ivan Dudynsky
- Presented by: Brad Falchuk
- Music by: Michael Gatt
- Country of origin: United States
- No. of episodes: 3

Production
- Executive producers: Brad Falchuk; Mikkel Bondesen; David Goldberg; David Friedman
- Running time: 46–55 minutes
- Production companies: Brad Falchuk Teley-Vision; Banijay Studios North America

Original release
- Network: Netflix
- Release: October 3, 2025 – present

Famous Last Words is an American television documentary series produced for Netflix. It is based on the Danish series Det sidste ord (Danish for 'The Last Word') from TV2. It is hosted by Brad Falchuk, who produces it along with Mikkel Bondesen. First announced in July 2024 when Netflix acquired the rights to the format, the show consists of an interview with a notable figure, expressly published posthumously, allowing the interviewee to tell their own message after their death.

== Premise ==
The show consists of an interview with subjects regarding their "recent" deaths, with only those two people present, creating an open and intimate atmosphere. Cameras are operated remotely, and recording personnel can't hear the interview. Only a very small number of people know who has participated before the episode is announced. Each episode lasts an hour, edited from approximately four hours of recorded material. Towards the end of the interview, the host leaves the set and allows the interviewee to close the episode with their final words to the audience. The complete recordings of the interviews are stored at the John F. Kennedy Center for the Performing Arts.

== Episodes ==
#	Person	Date recorded	Date of death	Date released	Ref(s)
1	Jane Goodall	March 2025	1 October 2025 (aged 91)	3 October 2025	
2	Eric Dane	November 2025	19 February 2026 (aged 53)	20 February 2026	
3	Gloria Steinem	February 2025	2 September 2026 (aged 92)	3 September 2026	

== Reception ==
Regarding the first episode, featuring Jane Goodall, New York Post stated that the interview was uplifting and an opportunity to reflect on a life well-lived, while seeing Falchuk as reverent but a bit dry. Iowa Source described the conversation as candid and friendly, with Falchuk steering with a gentle touch. The Brown Daily Herald praised the interview while also criticizing Falchuk's presence and insistence on authenticity and drama over substance. This episode was praised by the creator and host of the Danish version, Mikael Bertelsen, who described it as "some of the strongest television I had seen in a long time". He thought that her final speech was "incredible and very beautiful".

Regarding the second episode, featuring Eric Dane, Stuart Heritage of The Guardian, said it was "undeniably powerful" and added "some subjects will be scared, others angry, many performative. However they react, though, what an honour to allow us to see them like this. A couple of decades from now, Famous Last Words is going to be one of the most fascinating resources we will have. What a thing this is."

== Similar concepts ==
The New York Times made a video series titled The Last Word from 2006 to 2025, featuring influential people shortly before their presumed death.
