= Michael Provost =

American actor (born 1998)

- Born: Michael James Provost; January 24, 1998 (age 28); Bridgeport, Connecticut, U.S.
- Occupation: Actor
- Years active: 2011–present

Michael James Provost (born January 24, 1998) is an American actor. He is best known for his roles in Insatiable and 9-1-1: Nashville.

== Biography ==
Provost was born in Bridgeport, Connecticut and raised in Atlanta, Georgia. He is of French Canadian, Scottish, and Irish descent.

Provost began his on-screen career in 2011 as Boyd in the American television family sitcom Reed Between the Lines, appearing for one episode. He also had small roles in the films An Innocent Kiss, The Case for Christ, and Reality High. He gained prominence in 2018, starring as Brick Armstrong in the Netflix dark comedy series Insatiable. He also starred in the 2021 film Fear Street Part Two: 1978 and appeared as a 'holdover' in the 2023 film The Holdovers. In television, Provost starred as Eli in the third season of The Sex Lives of College Girls and as Ryan Hart in 9-1-1: Nashville since 2025.

== Filmography ==
Key
†	Denotes works that have not yet been released

=== Film ===
Year	Title	Role	Notes
2016	An Innocent Kiss	Henry	
2017	The Case for Christ	Teen Lee Strobel	
2017	Reality High	Shannon	
2019	Saving Zoë	Parker	
2020	Most Guys Are Losers	Bo	
2021	Plan B	Hunter	
2021	Fear Street Part Two: 1978	Kurt	
2023	The Holdovers	Jason Smith	
2024	Horizon: An American Saga – Chapter 2	Anders	

=== Television ===
Year	Title	Role	Notes
2011	Reed Between the Lines	Boyd	1 episode
2017	Chance	Jason Spencer	2 episodes
2017	Six	Justin	1 episode
2018–2019	Insatiable	Brick Armstrong	Main role
2018	Shameless	Ben	1 episode
2019	Lucifer	Nate Mifflin	1 episode
2019	All Rise	Paul Larson	1 episode
2023	Quantum Leap	William Bloodborne	1 episode
2024–2025	The Sex Lives of College Girls	Eli	Recurring role, Season 3
2025– present	9-1-1: Nashville	Ryan Hart	Main role; 17 episodes
