= An Innocent Kiss =

- Directed by: Jason Shirley
- Written by: Jason Shirley
- Starring: Burt Reynolds
- Release date: 2016
- Running time: 114 minutes
- Country: United States
- Language: English

An Innocent Kiss (formerly titled Elbow Grease) is a 2016 American comedy-drama film written and directed by Jason Shirley and starring Burt Reynolds.

== Cast ==
- Burt Reynolds as Grandpa
- Michael Abbott Jr. as Randy Barnes
- R. Keith Harris as Billy Barnes
- Whitney Goin as Ellie Barnes

== Production ==
The film was shot in 30 days in Seneca, South Carolina, in 2013.

== Release ==
The film had a "soft release" in 2016. It also had a one-night premiere in Seneca in October 2018.

== Reception ==
The Dove Foundation gave the film a negative review, calling it "a little too ripe".
