= Brad Falchuk =

American television writer, director, and producer (born 1971)

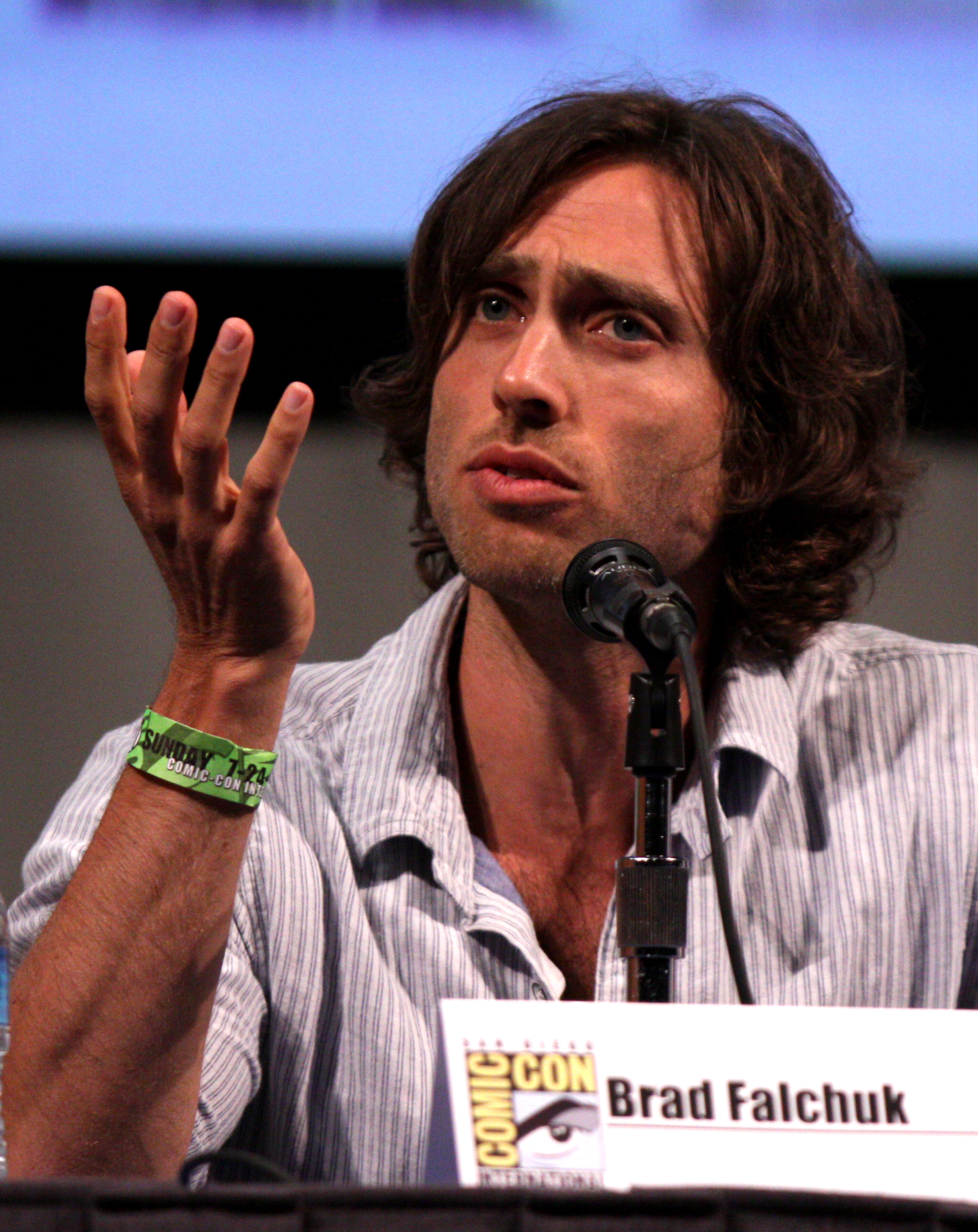
- Falchuk in 2011
- Born: Bradley Douglas Falchuk; March 1, 1971 (age 55); Newton, Massachusetts, U.S.
- Education: Hobart College (BA); American Film Institute (MFA)
- Occupations: Screenwriter; director; producer
- Years active: 2001–present
- Notable work: Glee; American Horror Story; Scream Queens; 9-1-1; Pose; The Brothers Sun
- Spouses: Suzanne Bukinik (m. 2002; div. 2013) Gwyneth Paltrow (m. 2018)
- Children: 2
- Relatives: Apple Martin (stepdaughter)

Bradley Douglas Falchuk (born March 1, 1971) is an American television writer, director, and producer. He is best known for co-creating the television series Glee, American Horror Story, Scream Queens, The Brothers Sun, and Pose with Ryan Murphy, as well as the 9-1-1 franchise with Murphy and Tim Minear. He was also a writer and executive producer for Nip/Tuck and is married to actress Gwyneth Paltrow. Recently, he became the host of the TV show Famous Last Words.

== Early life ==
Falchuk was born in Massachusetts to Jewish parents. His mother is Nancy Falchuk, the national president of the Hadassah Women's Zionist Organization of America from 2007 to 2011. In high school, he tried to stand out from his classmates by wearing a tie to school each day. He also played baseball, basketball and lacrosse. He said, "I was always trying to look smart because I didn't feel smart"; he actually had undiagnosed dyslexia. He graduated from Hobart and William Smith Colleges in 1993.

He received his master's in screenwriting from AFI Conservatory.

== Career ==
=== Beginnings and Glee ===
Falchuk's career in television began as a writer for Mutant X (2001), Earth: Final Conflict (2001–02) and Veritas: The Quest (2003), before he was hired to work on the first season of Nip/Tuck in 2003. While working on Nip/Tuck, he formed a close bond and partnership with the show's creator, Ryan Murphy. Falchuk and Murphy went on to write a television pilot titled Pretty/Handsome, about a transgender gynecologist, which the FX network bought in 2008. However, the pilot was not picked up as a series.

As Nip/Tuck neared its sixth and final season, Falchuk and Murphy began to look for their next project, and decided to focus on a lighter subject. They teamed up with Ian Brennan, who had written a screenplay about high school show choirs, to pitch a one-hour comedy about a glee club to the Fox Broadcasting Company. Their pitch was successful and turned into the television show Glee, which premiered in 2009. Falchuk, Murphy and Brennan received two Writers Guild of America Award nominations for Best Comedy Series and Best New Series.

After the early success of Glee, Falchuk signed a two-year, seven-figure deal with 20th Century Fox Television which involved further work on Glee as well as the development of other projects for the studio. Glee concluded following its sixth season, which aired from January 9 to March 20, 2015.

=== Anthology series and Scream Queens ===
In 2011, Falchuk co-created the FX horror-drama anthology series American Horror Story with previous collaborator Ryan Murphy. The first season, starring Jessica Lange, Connie Britton and Dylan McDermott, premiered October 5, 2011, and received critical acclaim; the series was nominated for 17 Primetime Emmy Awards in 2012, and 15 Primetime Emmys in 2013, with Falchuk nominated for Outstanding Miniseries or Movie both years. In 2014, the show was once again nominated for 17 Primetime Emmy Awards, with Falchuk nominated for Outstanding Writing for a Miniseries, Movie or a Dramatic Special.

Falchuk is an executive producer on American Crime Story with Ryan Murphy, which began airing on February 2, 2016. Falchuk, Murphy and Brennan also created Fox's horror comedy series Scream Queens, which ran from September 2015 to December 2016, and starred Emma Roberts, Lea Michele, Abigail Breslin, Keke Palmer and Jamie Lee Curtis. The first season was set on a college campus.

In March 2019, Falchuk signed a four-year overall deal with Netflix through his Brad Falchuk Teley-Vision production company to "develop, write, produce, and direct new series".

== Personal life ==
In 1997, as a student at the American Film Institute, Falchuk co-founded the arts education nonprofit Young Storytellers with Mikkel Bondesen and Andrew Barrett, in response to cutbacks in funding for creative arts programs in Los Angeles Unified School District. Falchuk previously served on the Young Storytellers advisory board of directors.

Falchuk's brother, Evan Falchuk, founded the United Independent Party and was a candidate for governor in the 2014 Massachusetts gubernatorial election.

In 2008, Falchuk was diagnosed by his father and brother's medical consulting firm as having a serious problem with his spinal cord. After undergoing emergency spinal surgery, he made a full recovery, and his experience inspired parts of the Glee episode "Wheels".

Falchuk's first wife was television producer Suzanne Bukinik, whom he began dating in 1994. The couple married in 2002 and have two children together. They filed for divorce in 2013.

Falchuk met actress Gwyneth Paltrow on the set of Glee in 2010, and they began dating in 2014. The couple went public with their relationship in April 2015 at a birthday party after months of speculation. On January 8, 2018, Paltrow and Falchuk announced their engagement. Their wedding was held on September 29, 2018, in The Hamptons on Long Island.

Falchuk and Paltrow practice Transcendental Meditation together.

== Credits ==
=== Writer/producer ===
- Mutant X (2001)
- Earth: Final Conflict (2001–2002)
- Nip/Tuck (2004–2010)
- Glee (2009–2015)
- American Horror Story (2011–present)
- Scream Queens (2015–2016)
- American Crime Story (2017–2021)
- 9-1-1 (2018–present)
- Pose (2018–2021)
- The Politician (2019–2020)
- 9-1-1: Lone Star (2020–2025)
- American Horror Stories (2021–2024)
- The Brothers Sun (2024)
- Famous Last Words (2025–present)
- Magic 8 Ball (TBA)

== Awards and nominations ==
Year	Award	Category	Work	Result
2010	AFI Awards	TV Program of the Year	Glee (with Ryan Murphy and Ian Brennan)	Won
2011	AFI Awards	TV Program of the Year	Glee (with Ryan Murphy and Ian Brennan)	Won
2011	British Academy Television Awards	Best International	Glee (with Ryan Murphy and Ian Brennan)	Nominated
2011	National Television Awards	Digital Choice	Glee (with Ryan Murphy and Ian Brennan)	Nominated
2010	Primetime Emmy Awards	Outstanding Writing for a Comedy Series	Glee (with Ryan Murphy and Ian Brennan)	Nominated
2010	Primetime Emmy Awards	Outstanding Comedy Series	Glee (with Ryan Murphy, Ian Brennan, Dante Di Loreto, Bradley Buecker, Alexis Martin Woodall and Kenneth J. Silverstein)	Nominated
2011	Primetime Emmy Awards	Outstanding Comedy Series	Glee (with Ryan Murphy, Ian Brennan, Dante Di Loreto, Bradley Buecker, Alexis Martin Woodall, Kenneth J. Silverstein and Michael Novick)	Nominated
2012	Primetime Emmy Awards	Outstanding Miniseries or Movie	American Horror Story: Murder House (with Ryan Murphy, Dante Di Loreto, Bradley Buecker, Alexis Martin Woodall and Chip Vucelich)	Nominated
2013	Primetime Emmy Awards	Outstanding Miniseries or Movie	American Horror Story: Asylum (with Ryan Murphy, Dante Di Loreto, Tim Minear, Jennifer Salt, James Wong, Jessica Sharzer, Bradley Buecker, Alexis Martin Woodall and Chip Vucelich)	Nominated
2014	Primetime Emmy Awards	Outstanding Writing for a Miniseries, Movie or a Dramatic Special	American Horror Story: Coven (with Ryan Murphy for the episode "Bitchcraft")	Nominated
2014	Primetime Emmy Awards	Outstanding Miniseries	American Horror Story: Coven (with Ryan Murphy, Dante Di Loreto, Bradley Buecker, Alexis Martin Woodall and Chip Vucelich)	Nominated
2015	Primetime Emmy Awards	Outstanding Limited Series	American Horror Story: Freak Show (with Ryan Murphy, Dante Di Loreto, Tim Minear, Jennifer Salt, James Wong, Bradley Buecker, Jessica Sharzer, Alexis Martin Woodall and Robert M. Williams Jr.)	Nominated
2016	Primetime Emmy Awards	Outstanding Limited Series	The People v. O. J. Simpson: American Crime Story (with Ryan Murphy, Nina Jacobson, Brad Simpson, Scott Alexander, Larry Karaszewski, D.V. DeVincentis, Anthony Hemingway, Alexis Martin Woodall, John Travolta und Chip Vucelich)	Won
2018	Primetime Emmy Awards	Outstanding Limited Series	The Assassination of Gianni Versace: American Crime Story (with Ryan Murphy, Nina Jacobson, Brad Simpson, Alexis Martin Woodall, Tom Rob Smith, Daniel Minahan, Scott Alexander, Larry Karaszewski, Chip Vucelich, Eric Kovtun, Lou Eyrich and Eryn Krueger Mekash)	Won
2021	Primetime Emmy Awards	Outstanding Drama Series	Pose (with Ryan Murphy, Nina Jacobson, Brad Simpson, Alexis Martin Woodall, Sherry Marsh, Steven Canals, Janet Mock, Our Lady J, Tanase Popa, Lou Eyrich, Jeff Dickerson, Todd Nenninger and Kip Davis Myers)	Nominated
2021	Primetime Emmy Awards	Outstanding Writing for a Drama Series	Pose (with Steven Canals, Our Lady J, Janet Mock, and Ryan Murphy for the episode "Series Finale")	Nominated
2011	Producers Guild of America Awards	Outstanding Producer of Episodic Television, Comedy	Glee (with Ian Brennan, Dante Di Loreto, Ryan Murphy and Kenneth J. Silverstein)	Nominated
2012	Producers Guild of America Awards	Outstanding Producer of Episodic Television, Comedy	Glee (with Ian Brennan, Dante Di Loreto, Ryan Murphy and Kenneth J. Silverstein)	Nominated
2013	Producers Guild of America Awards	Outstanding Producer of Long-Form Television	American Horror Story: Asylum (with Bradley Buecker, Dante Di Loreto, Alexis Martin Woodall, Ryan Murphy and Chip Vucelich)	Nominated
2014	Producers Guild of America Awards	Outstanding Producer of Long-Form Television	American Horror Story: Coven (with Bradley Buecker, Dante Di Loreto, Ryan Murphy, Chip Vucelich and Alexis Martin Woodall)	Nominated
2010	TV Quick Awards	Best New Drama	Glee (with Ryan Murphy and Ian Brennan)	Won
2011	TV Quick Awards	Best Drama Series	Glee (with Ryan Murphy and Ian Brennan)	Nominated
2010	Writers Guild of America Awards	New Series	Glee (with Ryan Murphy and Ian Brennan)	Nominated
2010	Writers Guild of America Awards	Comedy Series	Glee (with Ryan Murphy and Ian Brennan)	Nominated
2011	Writers Guild of America Awards	Comedy Series	Glee (with Ryan Murphy and Ian Brennan)	Nominated
2020	Writers Guild of America Awards	Valentine Davies Award		
