= Oliver Stark =

British actor (born 1991)

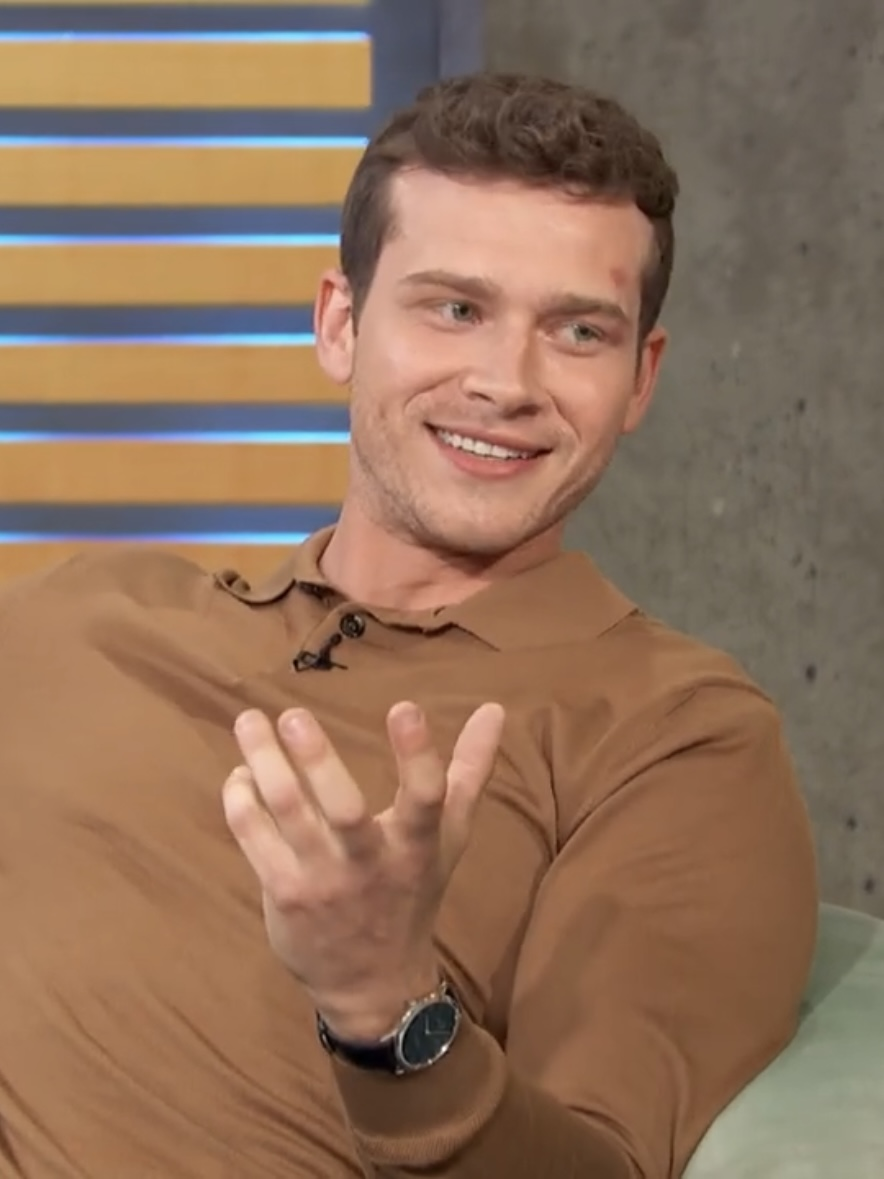
- Stark in 2022
- Born: Oliver Leon Jones; 27 June 1991 (age 35); London, England
- Occupation: Actor
- Years active: 2011–present

Oliver Leon Jones (born 27 June 1991), known professionally as Oliver Stark, is a British actor. He is best known for his roles as Evan "Buck" Buckley in 9-1-1 on Fox/ABC, and as Ryder in AMC's martial arts-based drama Into the Badlands.

== Early life ==
Oliver Leon Jones was born on 27 June 1991 in London, England. After joining the acting union in the UK, he registered under the name "Oliver Stark" as "Oliver Jones" was not available. He decided to use his late grandmother's maiden name, "Stark".

== Career ==
Stark's first professional acting job came in 2011 when he was cast in David Alexander's short film Follow for the UK Film Council. Stark then went on to have guest roles in Luther and Casualty.

Stark then had a number of film roles (Underworld Blood Wars) and other TV roles before starring as series regular, Ryder, in AMC's martial arts-based drama Into the Badlands in 2015. Since 2018, Stark has played firefighter Evan "Buck" Buckley, a main character on the Fox/ABC procedural drama, 9-1-1.

== Personal life ==
Stark resides in Los Angeles, California. He has been romantically linked to model Hannah Gottesman since 2016. In a podcast interview with actress Maggie Lawson in 2025, Stark spoke about raising a cat and three dogs with his partner. They have since then adopted another dog.

In a Men's Health interview in 2022, Stark confirmed he is vegan.

== Filmography ==
=== Film ===
Year	Title	Role	Notes
2012	Community	Pack Leader	
2013	The Adventurer: Curse of the Midas Box	Glocky	
2014	Montana	Cal	
2015	Hard Tide	Alfie Fisher	
2016	Underworld: Blood Wars	Gregor	
2017	MindGamers	Dylan	

=== Television ===
Year	Title	Role	Notes
2011	Casualty	Kyle DeNane	Episode: "Natural Selection"
2013	Luther	Shaun Butler	1 episode
2013	Big Bad World	Bad Teenager	1 episode
2013	Dracula	PC Barraclough	Episode: "Come to Die"
2015	Venus vs. Mars	Steven	Episode: "First Date Rules"
2015–2017	Into the Badlands	Ryder	Main role (seasons 1-2)
2018–present	9-1-1	Evan "Buck" Buckley	Main role; Nominated - Teen Choice Award for Choice Drama TV Actor
2021	9-1-1: Lone Star	Evan "Buck" Buckley	Episode: "Hold the Line"
2024	Celebrity Family Feud	Himself	Contestant; episode: "Fantasy Sweets vs Golden Five and 9-1-1 vs Jury Duty"
2026	9-1-1: Nashville	Evan "Buck" Buckley	Episodes: "Spirit of the Games", “Boys and Boils”

=== Short Film ===
Year	Title	Role	Notes
2026	The Long Con	The Grifter	Main Role
