= Czech fire sport =

Sport based on the practice of firefighting

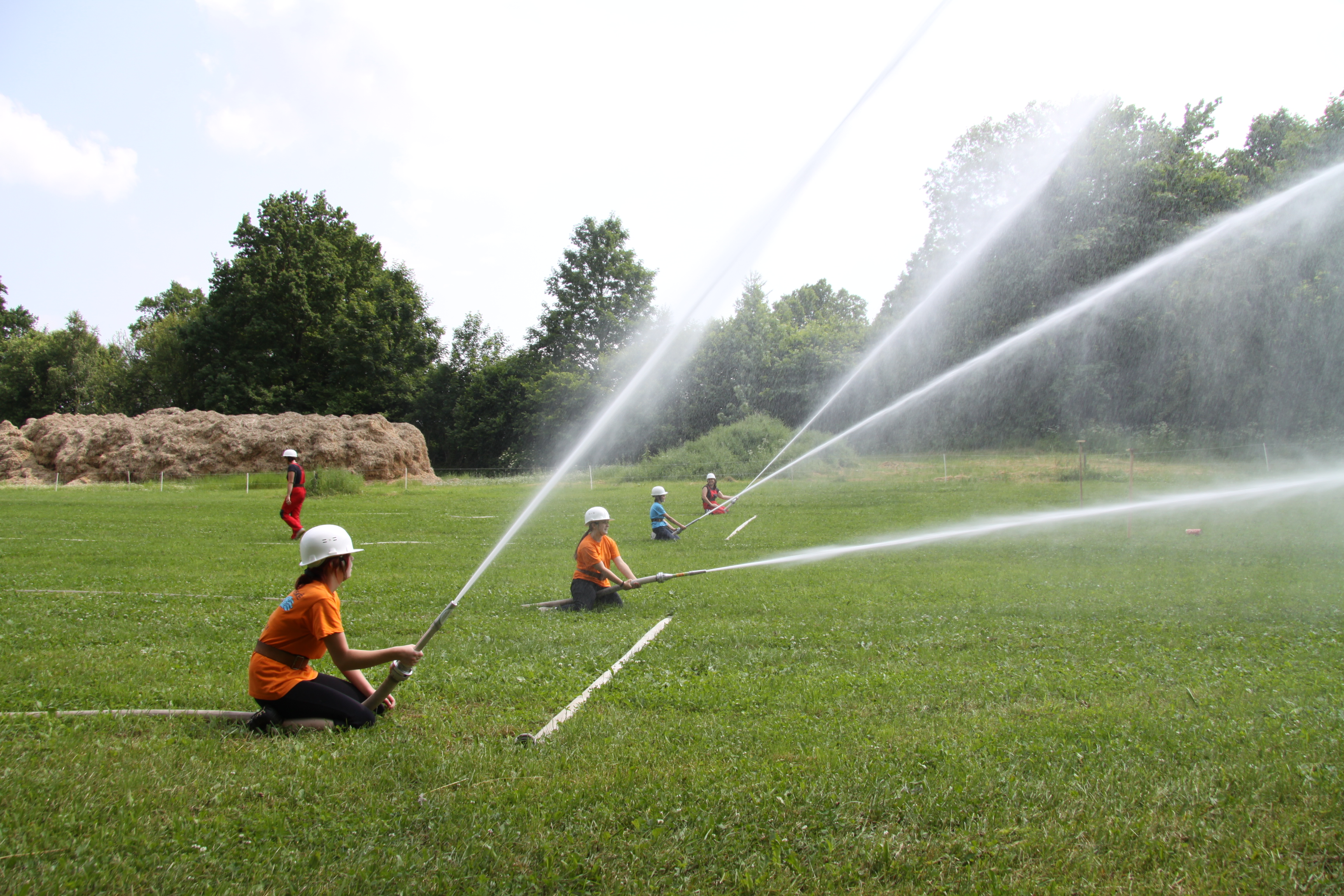
The Attack-a-Fire race. Each competitor is trying to hit a target.

Czech fire sport (Czech: Požární sport) is a Czech sport based on the practice of firefighting. Every Czech municipality has to establish a volunteer fire department in accordance with Regulation § 29 law nr. 133/1985 Sb. Consequently, a special subculture of volunteer firefighters developed, and later competitions in firefighter's skills were created.

== History ==
The first fire sport competition was held in 1937 in the Soviet Union, and the first Czech nationwide (in at that time the Czechoslovak Socialist Republic) competition was held in 1970.

There were at least 454 listed fire sport competitions in 2023.

== Events ==
=== 100-meter obstacle course (100 m překážek) ===
A race for individuals. Obstacles are specially designed to simulate firefighting reality.

=== 400-meter obstacle relay (4x100m překážek) ===
A race for a four-member team. Obstacles are specially designed to simulate firefighting reality.

=== Tower-climbing ===
A fire-sport tower and a ladder with hooks are needed. The goal is to reach the fourth floor by hooking the window frames of the tower. The most challenging event.

=== Fire attack (požární útok) ===
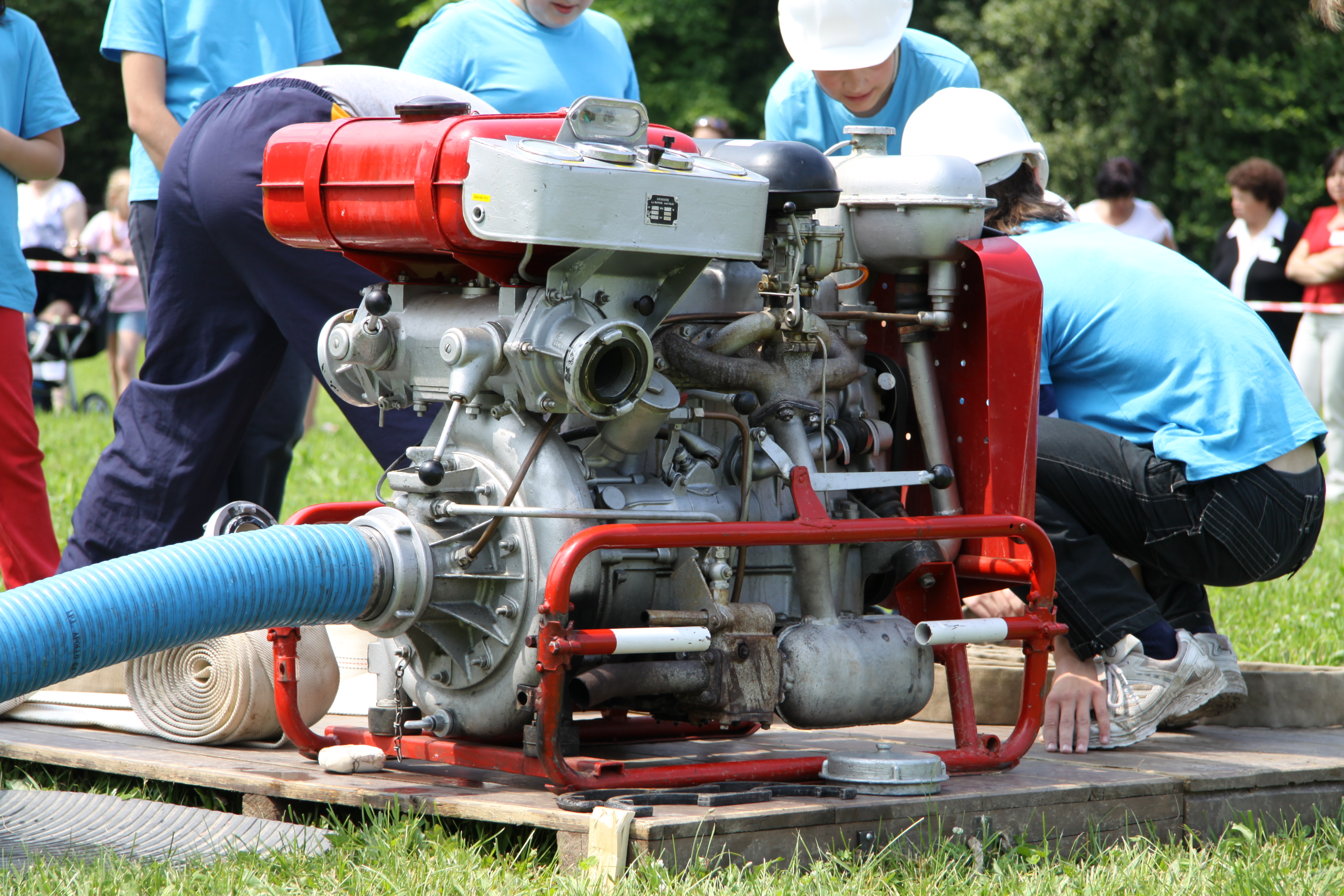
Sport water pump

The event with the highest number of competing teams. Each team has seven members.

The event requires a pool (káď), water pump (stroj or mašina), hard suction hose (savice), fire hose splitter (rozdělovač or rozbočovač), smooth bore nozzle (proudnice), and two types of hoses. The first type is The B-Hose (hadice B), with a nominal inner diameter of 65 mm to 75 mm. The second is the C-Hose (hadice C), with a nominal inner diameter of 38 mm to 52 mm.

The goal is to hit a small target with the water stream. The target is connected by wire to a chronometer.

== Categories ==
- Preschoolers (4–6 years)
- Younger children (6–11 years)
- Older children (11–15 years)
- Youth boys (13–18 years)
- Youth girls (13–18 years)
- Adult men (18+ years)
- Adult women (18+ years)
- Seniors (35+ years)
