= Aramide Tinubu =

American writer

Aramide Tinubu is an American writer, known for her work as a TV critic at Variety. She is also a Film Critic, Consultant, and Entertainment editor.

== Career ==
Tinubu studied at NYU and got her master's degree in Film Studies from Columbia University. Her Master's Thesis was on the topic of Black Girlhood and Parental Loss in Contemporary Black American Cinema. In 2022, she was selected by a jury of eminent critics as one of 4 emerging journalists for Unilab France's Critics Lab at the Cannes Film Festival.

In 2023 she joined the staff of Variety as their TV Critic. Her work as a journalist has been published in Ebony, JET, Essence, Indiewire, The Hollywood Reporter, and others. She is a member of the Critics Choice Association, The Black Film Critics Circle, The African American Film Critics Association, and the Online Film Critics Society. She has written professionally and appeared on television as at film and television critic since 2015, reviewing shows and curating best of lists for Variety, NBC News, and others.
