= Kenneth Choi =

American actor (born 1971)

- Born: October 20, 1971 (age 55); Chicago, Illinois, U.S.
- Occupation: Actor
- Years active: 1998–present

Kenneth Choi (born October 20, 1971) is an American actor. He is known for playing Henry Lin on the television series Sons of Anarchy (2008–2014), Chester Ming in Martin Scorsese's The Wolf of Wall Street (2013), and Judge Lance Ito in The People v. O. J. Simpson: American Crime Story (2016). He is also known for his roles as Jim Morita and Principal Morita in the Marvel Cinematic Universe films Captain America: The First Avenger (2011) and Spider-Man: Homecoming (2017) respectively, and Lewis on the Fox comedy series The Last Man on Earth (2016–2017). Since 2018 he has been starring in the Fox/ABC drama series 9-1-1, playing LAFD firefighter Howie "Chimney" Han.

== Early life ==
Eventually I said, you know, "I'm going to give it a go, I’m going to try it" and so I dropped out of school, I packed up all of my belongings, which was not much, [I] saved up enough money to buy a one-way Greyhound ticket and I came out West.

— Kenneth Choi

Choi was born in Chicago, Illinois, to Korean immigrants. His father was an electrical engineering professor and businessman. His mother was a registered nurse before becoming a stay-at-home mother. Choi is the middle of three children. He attended Longwood Elementary in Glenwood, Illinois and intermediate and junior high school at Brookwood School District 167. Choi performed as a breakdancer in junior high. He ran cross-country and was a gymnast at Homewood-Flossmoor High School, where he held the sophomore record for the pommel horse. His parents, especially his father, discouraged his childhood dreams of becoming an actor, instructing him to pursue a "responsible and reasonable" career, like accounting. Choi followed the advice of his parents and majored in accounting at Purdue University, but decided to drop out to pursue his acting dream. Choi stated: "I came from a very traditional Asian upbringing so they were very strict. When I decided to pursue acting, I knew that I had to do it all on my own. When I left the Midwest, I cut all ties with my family. I basically ran away from home."

Choi moved to Portland, Oregon to pursue acting. He had no work experience so he gained employment at a Blockbuster video store. He spent the next five years training with Portland acting teachers, most notably Paul Warner.

== Acting career ==
Choi began his acting career in Portland, Oregon. His first role was in the Disney Channel television film, Halloweentown, with Debbie Reynolds. Choi moved to Los Angeles in late 1999 to further pursue acting. In film, he appeared in The Wolf of Wall Street (as Chester Ming), Captain America: The First Avenger (as Jim Morita), Red Dawn (as Smith) and Suicide Squad. In the 2017 film Spider-Man: Homecoming, he plays a grandson of his Captain America character.

Choi has appeared on television. He played Henry Lin in Sons of Anarchy, Captain Ed Rollins on the NBC TV series Ironside and Sam Luttrell for the NBC TV series Allegiance.

Choi played Judge Lance Ito in The People v. O.J. Simpson: American Crime Story. He has appeared in various TV series including Longmire, The Newsroom, The Last Man on Earth, Glee, Heroes, 24, Lincoln Heights, CSI: Crime Scene Investigation, House M.D. and The King of Queens.

Choi provided his voice as Jim Morita for the video game Captain America: Super Soldier. He voiced the role of a gangster in the 2004 video game Grand Theft Auto: San Andreas.

In October 2017, Choi was cast as Howie "Chimney" Han on Fox TV's 9-1-1. In 2018, Choi played Bob Dwyer on Starz's Counterpart. Also that year, he appeared in the feature films Gringo and Hotel Artemis.

Starting in season 14 of King of the Hill, Choi became the new voice of Ted Wassanasong who was previously voiced in earlier seasons by Toby Huss.

In April 2024, Choi joined Amazon MGM Studios' sci-fi thriller entitled Mercy.

== Filmography ==
=== Film ===
| Year | Title | Role | Notes |
|---|---|---|---|
| 1998 | Halloweentown | Hip-Sales-Creature | |
| 2000 | Deep Core | Wayne Lung | |
| 2001 | Beyond the Pale | Douglas | |
| 2002 | Woman on Fire | Janitor | |
| 2003 | Timecop 2: The Berlin Decision | Professor Josh Chan | |
| 2004 | The Terminal | CBP Officer | |
| 2005 | The Road to Canyon Lake | Pong | |
| 2005 | Harsh Times | Fujimoto | |
| 2006 | Behind Enemy Lines II: Axis of Evil | South Korean Ambassador Li Sung Park | |
| 2006 | Only the Brave | Dave Fukushima | |
| 2006 | Undoing | Danny | |
| 2006 | The Heart Specialist | Mitchell Kwan | |
| 2007 | Baby | Mike | |
| 2007 | Walk the Talk | Dave | |
| 2007 | War | Takada | |
| 2007 | Koreatown | Sil The Well Dressed Drug Dealer | |
| 2008 | Street Kings | Boss Kim | |
| 2011 | Captain America: The First Avenger | Jim Morita | |
| 2012 | Dr0ne | Jay | |
| 2012 | Red Dawn | Corporal Smith | |
| 2012 | The Real St. Nick | Jack | |
| 2013 | Five Thirteen | C.I.A. | |
| 2013 | The Wolf of Wall Street | Chester Ming | |
| 2016 | Suicide Squad | Yakuza Boss | |
| 2017 | Stephanie | | |
| 2017 | Spider-Man: Homecoming | Principal Morita | |
| 2017 | Bright | Yamahara | |
| 2018 | Gringo | Marty | |
| 2018 | Hotel Artemis | Buke | |
| 2018 | Office Uprising | Freddy Wong | |
| 2024 | All That We Love | Andy | |
| 2026 | Mercy | Ray Vale | |
| 2026 | Coyote vs. Acme | Oscar Jeon | |

=== Television ===
| Year | Title | Role | Notes |
|---|---|---|---|
| 1999 | Martial Law | Biohazard Driver | Episode: "Blue Flu" |
| 2000 | The West Wing | Secret Service Agent #1 | Episode: "Six Meetings Before Lunch" |
| 2000 | The Huntress | Douglas Ho | Episode: "Scattered" |
| 2000 | Arliss | Tommy Takega | Episode: "Where There's a Will..." |
| 2000 | V.I.P. | Desmond Kusari | Episode: "Magnificent Val" |
| 2000 | Roswell | Ken | Episode: "Skin and Bones" |
| 2001 | The Division | Louis Tang | Episode: "Absolution" |
| 2001 | The Brothers García | Alec Lind | Episode: "Band on the Run" |
| 2001 | Kristin | 'Smoove' | Episode: "The Escort" |
| 2001 | Dead Last | Syd The Junkie | Episode: "Heebee Geebee's" |
| 2002 | Reba | Officer Aoki | Episode: "Brock's Swan Song" |
| 2002 | The King of Queens | Todd Ling | Episode: "Holy Mackerel" |
| 2003 | Presidio Med | Dennis | 2 episodes |
| 2003 | Crossing Jordan | Garma | Episode: "Fire and Ice" |
| 2003 | Becker | Nam | Episode: "Dates & Nuts" |
| 2003–2004 | Dragnet | Criminal Investigator Burrell | 2 episodes |
| 2004 | According to Jim | Lab Technician | Episode: "A Vast Difference" |
| 2004–2005 | House | Dr. Lim | 2 episodes |
| 2005 | Las Vegas | Duncan Sabusawa | Episode: "Fake the Money and Run" |
| 2006 | CSI: Crime Scene Investigation | Jason Tua | Episode: "Post Mortem" |
| 2007 | Shark | Kirk Bagley | Episode: "The Wrath of Khan" |
| 2007 | Lincoln Heights | Anthony Moon | Episode: "Tricks Treats" |
| 2007 | 24 | Cheng's Operative | 4 episodes |
| 2008 | Samurai Girl | Sato | 6 episodes |
| 2008–2009 | Crash | Mikey Han | 3 episodes |
| 2008–2014 | Sons of Anarchy | Henry Lin | 14 episodes |
| 2009 | Without a Trace | Agent Philip Shen | Episode: "Once Lost" |
| 2009 | Heroes | Sam Douglas | Episode: "Chapter Nine 'Turn and Face the Strange'" |
| 2009 | Glee | Dr. Wu | 2 episodes |
| 2010 | Hawthorne | Dr. Paul Hyun | 3 episodes |
| 2011 | Last Man Standing | Dr. Wong | 2 episodes |
| 2012 | The Newsroom | Dr. Lee | Episode: "The Greater Fool" |
| 2013 | Ironside | Captain Ed Rollins | 9 episodes |
| 2013 | Longmire | Dr. Bloomfield | Episode: "Tuscan Red" |
| 2014 | Agents of S.H.I.E.L.D. | Jim Morita | Episode: "Shadows" |
| 2015 | Allegiance | Sam Luttrell | 13 episodes |
| 2016 | The People v. O.J. Simpson: American Crime Story | Judge Lance Ito | 7 episodes |
| 2016–2017 | The Last Man on Earth | Lewis | 10 episodes |
| 2017 | Chicago Med | Dr. David Kwon | 2 episodes |
| 2017 | Dimension 404 | Kojima | Episode: "Impulse" |
| 2018–present | 9-1-1 | Howard “Chimney” Han | Main role |
| 2018 | Counterpart | Bob Dwyer | 4 episodes |
| 2019 | Snowfall | Bobby 'Bob-Bob' Kim | Episode: "Cash and Carry" |
| 2025–present | King of the Hill | Ted Wassanasong (voice) | Replaced Toby Huss; 4 episodes |
| 2025 | The Morning Show | John Ellis | 2 episodes |
| 2026 | 9-1-1: Nashville | Howard “Chimney” Han | Episode: “Boys and Boils” |

=== Video games ===
| Year | Title | Role |
|---|---|---|
| 2004 | Grand Theft Auto: San Andreas | Gangster |
| 2011 | Captain America: Super Soldier | Jim Morita |

=== Music videos ===
List of music videos, showing year released and director
| Year | Artist | Song title | Director |
|---|---|---|---|
| 2016 | OneRepublic | "Wherever I Go" | Joseph Kahn |
