= Juani Feliz =

Dominican-American actress (born 1989)

- Born: January 3, 1989 (age 37); Dominican Republic
- Education: Harvard University (BS, MS)
- Occupation: Actress
- Years active: 2005–present
- Spouse: Claribel Jimenez (m. 2021)
- Children: 1

Juani Feliz (born January 3, 1989) is a Dominican-American actress. She is best known for her roles as Isabela Benitez-Santiago in the Amazon series Harlem, Carmen in the HBO Max series DMZ, and Alejandra Lopez in FX's Fleishman Is In Trouble. She stars as Roxie Alba in Ryan Murphy's ABC drama 9-1-1 Nashville.

== Early life ==
Feliz was born in the Dominican Republic and raised in the Bronx. She started acting at the age of 14 after getting involved in her first school play. She landed her first TV role at the age of 15 on Law & Order: Criminal Intent. Her acting career took a backseat when she graduated high school and studied biomedical engineering at Harvard University. After college, Feliz worked at the Wyss Institute for Biologically Inspired Engineering in Boston, where she worked on a clinical trial for a melanoma cancer vaccine and helped develop biomaterials and drug delivery systems. During this time she also completed a master's degree at Harvard. Despite a promising career in bioengineering, Feliz made her return to acting in 2016.

== Career ==
Upon her return to acting, Feliz made her big-screen debut in The Purge: Election Year and went on to appear in several television series, including Power, Shades of Blue, One Dollar, Blue Bloods, The Good Doctor.

in 2019, Feliz was cast as a series regular in the ABC drama pilot Until The Wedding.

In 2021, she played Isabela Benitez-Santiago in Amazon's comedy series Harlem, from Tracy Oliver and Amy Poehler.

In 2022, Feliz played Carmen in the HBO Max limited series DMZ, from Ava DuVernay and Roberto Patino. Later that year, she played Alejandra Lopez in the FX limited series Fleishman Is In Trouble, Taffy Brodesser-Akner's screen adaptation of her 2019 NYT best-selling novel.

In 2022, Feliz was included in People en Español's list of "50 Más Bellos" ("50 Most Beautiful").

In 2023, she reprised her role as Isabela Benitez-Santiago in the second season of Harlem and guest starred in episodes of The Rookie: Feds and NCIS: Hawaiʻi .

In 2024, Feliz starred in Alex Garland's dystopian film Civil War for A24.

In 2023 and 2024, Feliz was nominated for the "Best Actor/Actress Abroad" award at the Soberano Awards in the Dominican Republic for her work in Harlem and Fleishman Is In Trouble.

In early 2025, it was announced that Feliz and Titus Welliver would headline a potential spinoff of The Equalizer for CBS. The two portrayed a father-daughter duo introduced in a backdoor pilot episode of the original series. In a wave of cancellations, CBS opted to not move forward with the spinoff and cancelled the mothership series shortly after.

Feliz was later cast as a series regular in Ryan Murphy's new ABC drama 9-1-1 Nashville, where she stars as Roxie Alba, a former trauma surgeon turned firefighter paramedic.

== Personal life ==
Feliz married her wife, Claribel Jimenez-Feliz, a Disney account executive, in September 2021 in New York City. They welcomed their daughter in 2024.

== Filmography ==
=== Film ===
Year	Title	Role	Notes
2006	Delirious	Staci from Queens	
2016	The Fastest, Most Romantic Love Yet	Female #3	
2016	The Purge: Election Year	Schoolgirl #2	
2016	Doctor Strange	Girl on Bus	Uncredited
2017	The Polka King	PR Woman	
2018	Canal Street	Zoey Swanson	
2024	Civil War	Joy Butler	
TBA	Quiet In My Town	Janet	

=== Television ===
Year	Title	Role	Notes
2005	Law & Order: Criminal Intent	Esperanza	Episode: "Acts of Contrition"
2006	Conviction	Vida Diletez	Episode: "Savasana"
2018	Shades of Blue	Vanessa Ruiz	2 episodes
2018	One Dollar	Paloma	Episode: "Chelsea Wyler"
2019	Blue Bloods	Corey Vallejo	2 episodes
2019	Power	Jesenia	Episode: "Deal with the Devil"
2019	Until the Wedding	Isabel	Television film
2021–2022	Harlem	Isabela Benitez-Santiago	8 episodes
2022	DMZ	Carmen	3 episodes
2022	Fleishman Is in Trouble	Alejandra Lopez	3 episodes
2022	The Rookie: Feds	Detective Naomi Voss	2 episodes
2023	NCIS: Hawai'i	CID Sgt. Summer Westmore	Episode: "Shields Up
2025	The Equalizer	Samantha Reed	Episode: "Sins of the Father"
2025	9-1-1: Nashville	Roxie Alba	Regular cast
2026	The Terror	Marisol	Season 3: The Terror: Devil in Silver
