= 9-1-1 (TV series) =

American television series (2018–present)

- Genre: Procedural drama
- Created by: Ryan Murphy; Brad Falchuk; Tim Minear
- Starring: Angela Bassett; Peter Krause; Oliver Stark; Aisha Hinds; Kenneth Choi; Rockmond Dunbar; Connie Britton; Jennifer Love Hewitt; Ryan Guzman; Corinne Massiah; Marcanthonee Jon Reis; Gavin McHugh; John Harlan Kim; Elijah M. Cooper
- Composers: Mac Quayle; Todd Haberman
- Country of origin: United States
- Original language: English
- No. of seasons: 10
- No. of episodes: 148 (list of episodes)

Production
- Executive producers: Ryan Murphy; Brad Falchuk; Tim Minear; Juan Carlos Coto; Kristen Reidel; Lyndsey Beaulieu; Alexis Martin Woodall; John J. Gray; Bradley Buecker; Peter Krause; Angela Bassett
- Producers: Lou Eyrich; Eryn Krueger Mekash; Adam Penn; Erica L. Anderson; Matthew Hodgson; Robert M. Williams Jr.; Jeff Dickerson
- Production location: Los Angeles, California
- Cinematography: Joaquin Sedillo; Gavin Kelly; Duane Mieliwocki
- Editor: Tom Costantino
- Camera setup: Single-camera
- Running time: 42–46 minutes
- Production companies: Reamworks Productions, Inc.; Brad Falchuk Teley-Vision; Ryan Murphy Television; 20th Television (Note: Credited as 20th Century Fox Television for seasons 1–3.)

Original release
- Network: Fox
- Release: January 3, 2018 – May 15, 2023
- Network: ABC
- Release: March 14, 2024 – present

Related
- 9-1-1: Lone Star; 9-1-1: Nashville

9-1-1 is an American procedural drama television series created by Ryan Murphy, Brad Falchuk, and Tim Minear. The series premiered on Fox and currently airs on ABC; it is the first installment of the 9-1-1 franchise.

The series explores the high-stakes professional and personal lives of Los Angeles first responders—firefighters, police officers, and paramedics—as they endeavor to protect and save those in danger.

As of August 2026, the show stars Angela Bassett, Oliver Stark, Jennifer Love Hewitt, Ryan Guzman, Aisha Hinds, Kenneth Choi, Corinne Massiah, Elijah M. Cooper, and Gavin McHugh. It premiered on January 3, 2018. 9-1-1 is a joint production between Reamworks, Brad Falchuk Teley-Vision, and Ryan Murphy Television in association with 20th Television. The first six seasons aired on Fox before the show moved to ABC starting with season seven. In April 2025, the series was renewed for a ninth season, which premiered on October 9, 2025. In March 2026, the series was renewed for a tenth season which premiered on October 15, 2026.

== Premise ==
The series follows the professional and personal lives of Los Angeles first responders, focusing on the staff of Station 118 of the Los Angeles Fire Department (LAFD), the Los Angeles Police Department (LAPD), and 911 dispatchers responding to emergencies across the city.

== Cast and characters ==
- Angela Bassett as Athena Grant (née Carter), LAPD detective, Bobby's second wife
- Peter Krause as Robert "Bobby" Nash, former Captain of LAFD Station 118, Athena's second husband (seasons 1–8)
- Oliver Stark as Evan "Buck" Buckley, firefighter, Maddie's brother
- Aisha Hinds as Henrietta "Hen" Wilson, firefighter and paramedic
- Kenneth Choi as Howard "Chimney" Han, Captain of LAFD Station 118, Maddie's husband
- Rockmond Dunbar as Michael Grant, Athena's ex-husband (seasons 1–5)
- Connie Britton as Abigail "Abby" Clark, 911 dispatcher (season 1; special guest season 3)
- Jennifer Love Hewitt as Maddie Buckley, Buck's sister and 911 dispatcher, who eventually becomes Chimney's wife (season 2–present)
- Ryan Guzman as Edmundo "Eddie" Díaz, firefighter and paramedic (season 2–present)
- Corinne Massiah as May Grant, Athena and Michael's daughter (seasons 2–6, 9–present; recurring season 1, 8; guest season 7)
- Marcanthonee Jon Reis (seasons 2–6; recurring season 1) and Elijah M. Cooper (season 9–present; recurring season 7–8) as Harry Grant, Athena and Michael's son
- Gavin McHugh as Christopher "Chris" Díaz, Eddie's son (season 3–present; recurring season 2)
- John Harlan Kim as Albert Han, Chimney's half-brother (season 4; guest season 3 and 6; recurring season 5)

== Episodes ==
Season	Episodes	Originally released			Rank	Viewership (millions)
Season	Episodes	First released	Last released	Network	Rank	Viewership (millions)
1	10	January 3, 2018	March 21, 2018	Fox	21	10.75
2	18	September 23, 2018	May 13, 2019	Fox	28	9.86
3	18	September 23, 2019	May 11, 2020	Fox	15	10.42
4	14	January 18, 2021	May 24, 2021	Fox	11	9.62
5	18	September 20, 2021	May 16, 2022	Fox	18	8.12
6	18	September 19, 2022	May 15, 2023	Fox	19	7.12
7	10	March 14, 2024	May 30, 2024	ABC	22	6.67
8	18	September 26, 2024	May 15, 2025	ABC	8	10.87
9	18	October 9, 2025	May 7, 2026	ABC	14	9.40
10	TBA	October 15, 2026	TBA	ABC	TBA	TBA

== Production ==
=== Development ===
The series is produced by 20th Television, with Murphy, Falchuk, Minear, and Bradley Buecker as executive producers along with cast members Angela Bassett and Peter Krause. Minear also serves as showrunner and Buecker directed the premiere episode. On January 16, 2018, Fox renewed the series for an eighteen-episode second season. The second season premiered with a special episode on Sunday, September 23, 2018, at 8 p.m. EDT; the second episode aired in the series's regular 9 p.m. EDT time slot on Monday, September 24, 2018. On March 25, 2019, Fox renewed the series for a third season, which premiered on September 23, 2019. On April 13, 2020, Fox renewed the series for a fourth season which premiered on January 18, 2021. On May 17, 2021, Fox renewed the series for a fifth season which premiered on September 20, 2021. On May 16, 2022, Fox renewed the series for a sixth season which premiered on September 19, 2022.

On May 1, 2023, the series was canceled by Fox and was renewed for a seventh season at ABC. The seventh season premiered on March 14, 2024. On April 2, 2024, ABC renewed the series for an eighth season. The eighth season premiered on September 26, 2024. On April 3, 2025, ABC renewed the series for a ninth season, which premiered on October 9, 2025. On March 5, 2026, ABC renewed the series for a tenth season, which premiered on October 15, 2026.

=== Casting ===
In October 2017, Connie Britton, Bassett, and Krause joined the main cast. Later that month, it was announced that Oliver Stark, Aisha Hinds, Kenneth Choi, and Rockmond Dunbar had been cast in regular roles.

On May 14, 2018, it was announced that Jennifer Love Hewitt would join the main cast as Maddie Buckley, Buck's sister, in season 2, replacing the role of Britton's character Abby Clark. On May 23, 2018, Fox announced that Ryan Guzman would be joining the second season of the series as new firefighter Eddie Díaz. On June 4, 2018, it was announced that Corinne Massiah and Marcanthonee Jon Reis, who play May and Harry Grant, had been promoted, from their recurring roles in season 1, to series regulars for season 2. Gavin McHugh, who plays Eddie's son Christopher, was promoted to a series regular in season 3, after recurring in season 2. Britton returned in the finale of the third season as a special guest star, reprising her role as Abby Clark. John Harlan Kim, who portrays Albert Han, was promoted to a series regular for the fourth season, after appearing as a guest in season 3.

In season 5, Dunbar departed over the COVID-19 vaccine mandate implemented by 20th Television after his requests for medical and religious exemptions were denied. Kim was changed to recurring status for the season. In February 2022, Arielle Kebbel joined the cast in a recurring role that same season. It was also the last season to star Reis, and his character was recast with Elijah M. Cooper in season 7. Corrine Massiah returned to a recurring role in the same season while attending college.

In April 2025, it was reported that Krause had left the show after the two-part eighth season episode in which his character dies. In August 2025, Massiah returned to the main cast, with Cooper also being promoted as a series regular for the ninth season.

== Syndication ==
Reruns began airing on USA Network starting on January 5, 2022 and on We TV starting September 4, 2023.

== Reception ==
=== Critical response ===
Critical response of 9-1-1
Season	Rotten Tomatoes	Metacritic
1	70% (33 reviews)	60% (21 critics)
2	100% (7 reviews)	—N/a
3	75% (8 reviews)	—N/a
8	87% (98 reviews)	—N/a
9	100% (6 reviews)	—N/a

On Rotten Tomatoes, the first season has an approval rating of 70%, based on 33 reviews, with an average rating of 5.9/10. The website's critical consensus reads, "9-1-1 occasionally veers into melodrama, but is redeemed with a top-tier cast, adrenaline-pumping action, and a dash of trashy camp that pushes the show into addictive guilty pleasure territory." Metacritic, which uses a weighted average, assigned a score of 60 out of 100 based on reviews from 21 critics, indicating "mixed or average reviews".

Amy Amatangelo of Paste praised the disasters depicted across the series and the action sequences, applauded Angela Bassett's performance and her character's storyline, while complimenting the development of the characters across their relationships. Steve Greene of IndieWire called 9-1-1 a perfect hit, stating the show manages to feel realistic and emotional across its dialogues and the relationships between the characters, applauded the action sequences with the different disasters, and praised the performances of the cast. Daniel Fienberg of The Hollywood Reporter found the series to be a conventional yet solid procedural drama, comparing it to the Chicago franchise, and applauded the performances of the cast, while calling the characters decent.

Suzi Feay of Financial Times rated the first season 4 out of 5 stars, called it an intense and juddering drama series across its emergency calls, and stated 9-1-1 has the potential to become a classic of the "hero genre". Melissa Camacho of Common Sense Media gave season one 3 out of 5 stars, complimented the depiction of positive messages and role models, stating the series depicts how difficult, traumatic, and personally fulfilling being a first responder can be across its characters, while calling the series solid overall.

On Rotten Tomatoes, the second season has an approval rating of 100%, based on 7 reviews, with an average rating of 7.8/10.

Brian Grubb of Uproxx stated the second season of the series manages to be more ambitious than the first one, applauding the disasters and action sequences, and praised the performances of the cast and the development of the characters.

On Rotten Tomatoes, the third season has an approval rating of 75%, based on 8 reviews, with an average rating of 6.5/10.

=== Ratings ===
9-1-1 Season 7 finale reached nearly 10 million viewers within a week of viewing, drawing 9.59 million total viewers and a 2.05 rating among adults 18-49 after seven days of viewing across ABC, Hulu, and digital platforms. This marked the best multiplatform viewership for the show since April and made it the top broadcast TV drama among adults 18-49 for the season with an average live-plus-seven-day rating of 0.83. In terms of live-plus-seven-day viewing on ABC alone, the finale scored 6.91 million total viewers, up 33% from its live-plus-same-day viewership of 5.20 million, and a 0.90 rating, a 48% increase from its initial live-plus-same-day rating of 0.61. 9-1-1 saw significant viewership growth for its latest season, with the Season 8 premiere attracting 9.8 million viewers after seven days of multi-platform viewing, a 106% increase from its live + same-day audience of 4.8 million. The episode also saw nearly a 20% lift from its three-day audience of 8.27 million viewers. In the 18-49 demographic, the premiere reached a 1.95 rating, which was a 359% increase from its same-day rating of 0.42. The April 17, 2025, episode of 9-1-1 attracted 8.45 million multi-platform viewers within seven days of its debut. On ABC alone, the live-plus-seven-day audience reached 5.64 million viewers, marking a 48% increase compared to the initial live-plus-same-day viewership of 3.81 million. The episode earned a 1.74 rating among adults 18‑49 across all platforms, up 11% from the previous week's 1.57 rating.

Viewership and ratings per season of 9-1-1
Season	Timeslot (ET)	Network	Episodes	First aired		Last aired		TV season	Viewership rank	Avg. viewers (millions)	18–49 rank	Avg. 18–49 rating
Season	Timeslot (ET)	Network	Episodes	Date	Viewers (millions)	Date	Viewers (millions)	TV season	Viewership rank	Avg. viewers (millions)	18–49 rank	Avg. 18–49 rating
1	Wednesday 9:00 pm	Fox	10	January 3, 2018	6.83	March 21, 2018	6.63	2017–18	21	10.75	13	3.0
2	Monday 9:00 pm (Note: The season premiere aired outside of its regular timeslot, on Sunday at 8:00 pm.)	Fox	18	September 23, 2018	9.83	May 13, 2019	6.44	2018–19	28	9.86	12	2.4
3	Monday 8:00 pm	Fox	18	September 23, 2019	7.14	May 11, 2020	7.29	2019–20	15	10.42	6	2.3
4	Monday 8:00 pm	Fox	14	January 18, 2021	7.19	May 24, 2021	6.35	2020–21	11	9.62	8	1.7
5	Monday 8:00 pm	Fox	18	September 20, 2021	5.08	May 16, 2022	5.55	2021–22	18	8.12	4	1.3
6	Monday 8:00 pm	Fox	18	September 19, 2022	4.82	May 15, 2023	4.32	2022–23	19	7.12	4	1.0
7	Thursday 8:00 pm	ABC	10	March 14, 2024	4.92	May 30, 2024	5.19	2023–24	22	6.67	5	0.83
8	Thursday 8:00 pm	ABC	18	September 26, 2024	4.93	May 15, 2025	4.05	2024–25	8	10.87	5	2.38
9	Thursday 8:00 pm	ABC	18	October 9, 2025	4.22	May 7, 2026	4.46	2025–26	14	9.40	13	1.84
10	Thursday 8:00 pm	ABC	18	October 15, 2026	4.31	TBA	TBD	2026–27	TBD	TBD	TBD	TBD

=== Accolades ===
Season 5 was recognized with The ReFrame Stamp for hiring people of underrepresented gender identities, and of color.

Year	Award	Category	Nominee(s)	Result	Ref.
2018	BET Awards	Best Actress	Angela Bassett	Nominated	
2018	Teen Choice Awards	Choice Breakout TV Show	9-1-1	Nominated	
2018	Teen Choice Awards	Choice Breakout TV Star	Oliver Stark	Nominated	
2018	California on Location Awards	Location Team of the Year - One Hour Television	Heather Haase, Spencer Coates, Matt Hickman, Jon Hollis, Brooke Kivowitz, Conrad Maslen, Lara Massengill, Courtney Ochoa, Perri Pearson, Jennifer Smith Doss, John West, Don Winklebauer, Chester Wong, Michael Borushek, Brittany Klaus	Won	
2019	AAFCA TV Awards	Best Performance - Female	Angela Bassett	Won	
2019	Black Reel Awards for Television	Outstanding Actress, Drama Series	Angela Bassett	Nominated	
2019	Teen Choice Awards	Choice Drama TV Actor	Oliver Stark	Nominated	
2019	Young Entertainer Awards	Best Guest Young Actor in a Television Series	Connor Dean	Nominated	
2020	BMI Film & TV Awards	BMI Network Television Awards	Mac Quayle	Won	
2020	NAACP Image Awards	Outstanding Actress in a Drama Series	Angela Bassett	Won	
2021	People's Choice Awards	The Drama Show of 2021	9-1-1	Nominated	
2021	People's Choice Awards	The Female TV Star of 2021	Angela Bassett	Nominated	
2021	People's Choice Awards	The Drama TV Star of 2021	Angela Bassett	Nominated	
2021	Critics' Choice Super Awards	Best Actress in an Action Series	Angela Bassett	Won	
2021	Critics' Choice Super Awards	Best Action Series	9-1-1	Nominated	
2021	NAACP Image Awards	Outstanding Actress in a Drama Series	Angela Bassett	Nominated	
2022	NAACP Image Awards	Outstanding Drama Series	9-1-1	Nominated	
2022	NAACP Image Awards	Outstanding Actress in a Drama Series	Angela Bassett	Won	
2022	BMI Film & TV Awards	BMI Network Television Awards	Mac Quayle	Won	
2022	California on Location Awards	Location Manager of the Year - Episodic Television - One Hour	Tim Hillman	Won	
2022	California on Location Awards	Location Team of the Year - Episodic Television - One Hour	9-1-1	Won	
2022	Critics Choice Super Awards	Best Actress in an Action Series	Angela Bassett	Nominated	
2022	Critics Choice Super Awards	Best Action Series	9-1-1	Nominated	
2023	NAACP Image Awards	Outstanding Actress in a Drama Series	Angela Bassett	Won	
2023	Black Reels Awards for Television	Outstanding Lead Performance in a Drama Series	Angela Bassett	Nominated	
2023	Black Reels Awards for Television	Outstanding Supporting Performance in a Drama Series	Aisha Hinds	Nominated	
2024	NAACP Image Awards	Outstanding Actress in a Drama Series	Angela Bassett	Nominated	
2024	Critics Choice Super Awards	Best Action Series	9-1-1	Nominated	
2024	Critics Choice Super Awards	Best Actress in an Action Series	Angela Bassett	Nominated	
2024	California On Location Awards	Location Manager of the Year - Episodic Television - One Hour	Tim Hillman	Won	
2024	California On Location Awards	Location Team of the Year - One Hour Television	Tim Hillman, Chanel Salzer, Mona Nash, Hannah Singleton, Jesus "Chuy" Rolon, Michael B. Louis, Sonia K. Villerias Fraustro, Gregory Catania, Shaka Terry, Charlotte Purin, Michael Yoon, Keaton Ross, Jon Cline	Won	
2024	Astra TV Awards	Broadcast Network Drama Series	9-1-1	Nominated	
2024	Astra TV Awards	Best Actress in a Broadcast Network or Cable Drama Series	Angela Bassett	Nominated	
2024	Astra TV Awards	Best Supporting Actress in a Broadcast Network or Cable Drama Series	Jennifer Love Hewitt	Nominated	
2025	NAACP Image Awards	Outstanding Actress in a Drama Series	Angela Bassett	Nominated	
2025	NAACP Image Awards	Outstanding Drama Series	9-1-1	Nominated	
2025	Astra TV Awards	Best Cast Ensemble in a Broadcast Network Drama Series	9-1-1	Nominated	
2025	Astra TV Awards	Best Actress in a Drama Series	Angela Bassett	Nominated	
2025	Astra TV Awards	Best Supporting Actress in a Drama Series	Jennifer Love Hewitt	Nominated	

== Spin-offs ==
On May 12, 2019, it was announced that a spin-off, titled 9-1-1: Lone Star, would premiere on January 19, 2020, immediately following the NFC Championship game and continue the following night, January 20, 2020. On the same day, Rob Lowe was announced to star. In September, Liv Tyler, Ronen Rubinstein, Sierra McClain, Jim Parrack, Natacha Karam, Brian Michael Smith, Julian Works, and Rafael L. Silva were also announced to star in the series alongside Lowe. Due to COVID-19 concerns, Liv Tyler did not return for the second season. Gina Torres was introduced in a regular role.

On October 1, 2024, shortly after it was confirmed that 9-1-1: Lone Star's fifth season would be its last, Ryan Murphy revealed to Variety that a second 9-1-1 spinoff was in the works for ABC. On February 20, 2025, ABC officially announced that a spin-off set in Nashville had been ordered, set to premiere in the 2025–26 season. On March 17, Chris O'Donnell was announced to be joining the cast. In April, it was announced that Jessica Capshaw had joined the cast. The following month, LeAnn Rimes and Kimberly Williams-Paisley were announced to star. On April 20, 2026, Ryan Phillippe joined the cast as a series regular for the second season.
