= List of As the World Turns cast members =

This is a list of actors and actresses who have had roles on the soap opera As the World Turns.

== Cast members ==
| Actor | Character | Duration |
|---|---|---|
| Ellen Adair | Nurse Gretchen Taylor | 2009-2010 |
| Mary Kay Adams | Neal Keller Alcott | 1992–1993 |
| Aki Aleong | Dr. Sam Yee | 1981-83 |
| Brooke Alexander | Samantha Anderson | 1994–1996 |
| Sherri Alexander | Samantha Anderson | 1997–1998 |
| Micah Alberti | Grown up Cabot | 2004 |
| Bobby Alford | Bob Hughes | 1956–1958 |
| Joan Allison | Claire English | 1964–1965 |
| Daniella Alonso | Pilar Domingo | 2004 |
| Real Andrews | Walker Daniels | 2003–2004 |
| Valentina de Angelis | Faith Snyder | 2010 |
| Sean Anthony | Andy Dixon | 1983–1984 |
| Dimitra Arliss | Greek woman | 1987 |
| Jennifer Ashe | Meg Snyder | 1986–1989, 1991–1994 |
| Tala Ashe | Ameera Ali Aziz | 2008 |
| Hillary Bailey Smith | Margo Hughes | 1983–1989 |
| Maggie Baird | Taylor Baldwin | 1987–1988 |
| Judith Barcroft | Susan Stewart | 1978 |
| Hayley Barr | Courtney Baxter | 1990–1994 |
| Kelli Barrett | Maddie Coleman | 2008–2009 |
| Steve Bassett | Seth Snyder | 1986–1988, 1990–1994, 2001 |
| Susan Batten | Connor Walsh | 1997 |
| Noelle Beck | Lily Walsh | 2008–2010 |
| Claire Beckman | Sabrina Hughes | 1990–1992 |
| Gregory Beecroft | Brock Lombard | 1989–1990 |
| Chris Beetem | Jordon Sinclair | 2004–2005 |
| Barbara Berjer | Claire English | 1964–1971 |
| Jason Biggs | Pete Wendell | 1994–1995 |
| Judith Blazer | Ariel Aldrin Donovan | 1982–1985 |
| Hunt Block | Craig Montgomery | 2000–2005 |
| Brian Bloom | Dusty Donovan | 1983–1988 |
| Claire Bloom | Orlena Grimaldi | 1994–1995 |
| Vasili Bogazianos | Bud Simpson | 2004 |
| Cynthia Bostick | Marcia Campbell | 1979 |
| Peter Boynton | Tonio Reyes | 1986–1992 |
| Peter Brandon | Donald Hughes | 1966–1972 |
| Joseph Breen | Scott Eldridge | 1992–1993 |
| Jordana Brewster | Nikki Munson | 1995–1998 |
| Colleen Broomall | Danielle Andropoulos | 1983–1989 |
| Lisa Brown | Iva Snyder Benedict | 1985-1994, 1998, 2000–2001, 2003 |
| Susan Brown | Adelaide Fitzgibbons | 1988 |
| Dylan Bruce | Christopher Hughes II | 2007–2008 |
| Patricia Bruder | Ellen Lowell | 1960–1995, 1998 |
| Scott Bryce | Craig Montgomery | 1982–1991, 1993–1994, 2007–2008 |
| Larry Bryggman | John Dixon | 1969–2004, 2010 |
| Jensen Buchanan | Vicky Hudson | 1999–2001 |
| Walter Burke | John Hughes | 1963 |
| Martha Byrne | Lily Walsh Snyder | 1985–1989, 1993–2008 |
| Martha Byrne | Rose D'Angelo | 2000–2004, 2006 |
| Kelly Campbell | Frannie Hughes | 1973–1974 |
| Melaney Candel | Frannie Hughes | 1982 |
| Eren Ross Cannata | Christopher Hughes II | 1990–1991 |
| John Capodice | Dr. Angelo Antinucci | 1989 |
| Dixie Carter | Dorothy Connors | 1983–1984 |
| Finn Carter | Sierra Esteban | 1985–1988, 1990–1991, 1994 |
| Sharon Case | Debbie Simon | 1992–1993 |
| Christopher Cass | Scott Eldridge | 1993 |
| Holly Cate | Janice Maxwell | 1993–1995 |
| Matt Cavenaugh | Adam Munson | 2006–2007 |
| Alexandra Chando | Maddie Coleman | 2005–2007, 2009–2010 |
| Doug Chapin | Dan Stewart | 1964 |
| Judith Chapman | Natalie Bannon | 1975–1978 |
| Leslie Charleson | Alice Whipple | 1966 |
| Bailey Chase | Christopher Hughes II | 2003–2005 |
| Shawn Christian | Mike Kasnoff | 1994–1997 |
| Charles Cioffi | Howard Lansing | 1987 |
| John Colenback | Dan Stewart | 1966–73, 1976–1979 |
| Margaret Colin | Margo Hughes | 1981–1983 |
| Mark Collier | Mike Kasnoff | 2002–2007, 2009 |
| Terri Conn | Katie Peretti | 1998–2010 |
| Kristen Connolly | Josie Anderson | 2008–2009 |
| Frank Converse | Ned Simon | 1992–1994 |
| Joan Copeland | Joan Rogers | 1966 |
| Joan Copeland | Greta Aldrin | 1982 |
| Daniel Cosgrove | Christopher Hughes II | 2010 |
| Nicolas Coster | Eduardo Grimaldi | 1993–1995 |
| Justine Cotsonas | Sofie Duran | 2007–2008 |
| Keith Coulouris | David Stenbeck | 1999–2000 |
| Christopher Cousins | Colin Crowley | 1990 |
| Courteney Cox | Bunny | 1984 |
| John Cunningham | Emerson Gallagher | 1992-93 |
| Cassandra Creech | Denise Maynard | 1998–2001 |
| Peter Crombie | Gage | 1989 |
| Joseph Cross | Casey Hughes | 1999–2000, 2002–2004 |
| Ashley Crow | Beatrice McKechnie | 1986–1987 |
| Ewa Da Cruz | Vienna Hyatt | 2006–2010 |
| Jon Cypher | Dr. Alexander Keith | 1978-79 |
| Joshua Dalin | Danielle Andropoulos | 1983 |
| Les Damon | Jim Lowell | 1956–1957 |
| Stuart Damon | Ralph Manzo | 2009–2010 |
| Napiera Danielle | Bonnie McKechnie | 2001–2004 |
| Toni Darnay | Franny Brennan | 1963–1965 |
| John Dauer | Jeremy Wheeler | 1995–1996 |
| Trent Dawson | Henry Coleman | 1999–2010 |
| Lucy Deakins | Lily Walsh Snyder | 1984–1985 |
| Loren Dean | Buddy | 1989 |
| Justin Deas | Tom Hughes | 1980–1984 |
| Scott DeFreitas | Andy Dixon | 1985–95, 1997–2000 |
| Dana Delany | Hayley Hollister | 1981 |
| Leslie Denniston | Carolyn DeWitt Crawford | 1990–1991 |
| Colleen Dion | Dahlia Ventura | 2001–2002 |
| Ellen Dolan | Margo Hughes | 1989–2010 |
| Phoebe Dorin | Penny Hughes | 1971 |
| James Douglas | Grant Colman | 1974–81, 1988–1989, 1994–95 |
| Wendy Drew | Ellen Lowell | 1956–1960 |
| Jaime Nicole Dudney | Georgia Tucker | 1998–2000 |
| Jessica Dunphy | Alison Stewart | 2002–2005 |
| Robert Dwyer | Andy Dixon | 1980 |
| Virginia Dwyer | Janice Turner | 1962 |
| Randall Edwards | Annie Stewart | 1982 |
| Tom Eplin | Jake McKinnon | 1999–2002 |
| Roy Eudon | Brad Snyder | 1999 |
| Carl T. Evans | Nick Scudder | 2001–2002 |
| Judi Evans | Maeve Stone | 2009 |
| Mary Beth Evans | Sierra Esteban | 2000–2005, 2010 |
| Jennifer Ferrin | Jennifer Munson | 2003–2006 |
| Jason Ferguson | Andrew Dixon | 1976–79 |
| William Fichtner | Rod Landry | 1987–1989, 1991–1994 |
| Ann Flood | Ruth Mansfield | 1992–1993 |
| Michael Forest | Nick Andropoulos | 1980–1982 |
| David Forsyth | Burke Donovan | 1983 |
| Henderson Forsythe | David Stewart | 1960–1990 |
| Conard Fowkes | Donald Hughes | 1978–1981, 1985–1986 |
| Mary Fox Kane | Frannie Hughes | 1991 |
| Elizabeth Franz | Helen Wendall | 1994-1995 |
| Dan Frazer | Dan McCloskey | 1984–1996 |
| Lindsay Frost | Betsy Stewart | 1984–1988 |
| Ed Fry | Larry McDermott | 1990–1995, 2009 |
| Christopher C. Fuller | Jef Hamlin | 1994–1996 |
| Eileen Fulton | Lisa Grimaldi | 1960–2010 |
| Terri Garber | Iris Dumbrowski | 2005–2008, 2010 |
| Hunter Garner | Billy Ross | 2001–2002 |
| Priscilla Garita | Rita | 1996 |
| Barbara Garrick | Rita Renfield | 1998–1999 |
| Brian Gaskill | B.J. Green | 2005 |
| Edmund Gaynes | Paul Stewart | 1964–1966 |
| Gil Gerard | Fred Warner | 1972 |
| Thomas Gibson | Derek Mason | 1988–1989 |
| Maura Gilligan | Frannie Hughes | 1975–1979 |
| Marc Gomes | Lewis McCloud | 1997 |
| Allie Gorenc | Sage Snyder | 2006–2010 |
| Farley Granger | Earl Mitchell | 1986–1988 |
| Ernest Graves | David Stewart | 1960 |
| Ronald Guttman | Franco Visconti | 1988 |
| Meredith Hagner | Liberty Ciccone | 2008–2010 |
| Alice Haining | Angel Lange Snyder | 1988–1994 |
| Cori Anne Hansen | Katie Peretti | 1989–1994 |
| Van Hansis | Luke Snyder | 2005–2010 |
| Bailey Harkins | Johnny Montgomery | 2008–2010 |
| Jenny Harris | Emily Stewart | 1975–1979 |
| Don Hastings | Bob Hughes | 1960–2010 |
| Michael Hawkins | Paul Stewart | 1968 |
| Kathryn Hays | Kim Sullivan Hughes | 1972–2010 |
| Mick Hazen | Parker Snyder | 2006–2010 |
| Paul Hecht | Alexander Cabot | 1992–1995 |
| Laurie Heineman | Mary Jackson | 1961–1966 |
| Aisha Henderson | Zoe Crane | 1996 |
| Benjamin Hendrickson | Hal Munson | 1985–2006 |
| Jon Hensley | Holden Snyder | 1985–1988, 1990–1995, 1997–2010 |
| Lynn Herring | Audrey Coleman | 2009 |
| Lauryn Hill | Kira Johnson | 1991 |
| Hallee Hirsh | Annie Hasbrook | 1996 |
| Adam Hirshan | Christopher Hughes II | 1986–1990 |
| Jonathan Hogan | Jason Benedict | 1989–1994 |
| Robert Hogan | Larry J. McDermott | 1991–92 |
| Richard Holland | Donald Hughes | 1956–1962 |
| Scott Holmes | Tom Hughes | 1987–2010 |
| Scott Holroyd | Paul Ryan | 2001–03 |
| Patrick Horgan | Anton Cunningham | 1986-1987, 1998 |
| John Howard | Paul Ryan | 1996 |
| Roger Howarth | Paul Ryan | 2003–2010 |
| Elizabeth Hubbard | Lucinda Walsh | 1984–2010 |
| Elizabeth Hubbard | Gloria Walters Keller | 2004–2005 |
| Laurence Hugo | John Hughes | 1956–1957 |
| Fiona Hutchison | Celia Frasier | 2000 |
| John James | Rick Decker | 2003–2004, 2008 |
| Peter Francis James | Blake Stevens | 1989–1991 |
| William Johnstone | Judge James T. Lowell | 1956–79 |
| Ben Jones | Judge Manning | 1999 |
| James Earl Jones | Jerry Turner | 1966 |
| John Christopher Jones | Al | 1995 |
| Wendy Jones | T. Jones | 1996 |
| Ben Jorgensen | Christopher Hughes II | 1999 |
| Agim Kaba | Aaron Snyder | 2002–2005, 2007–2010 |
| Andrew Kavovit | Paul Ryan | 1986–1992 |
| Lesli Kay | Molly Conlan | 1997–2004, 2009–2010 |
| Charles Keating | Niles Mason | 1989 |
| Lucas Kelly | Baby Cabot Montgomery | 2003-2004 |
| Sarah Knowlton | Tracey Donley | 1994–1995 |
| Nick Kokotakis | Brad Snyder | 1998–1999 |
| Paul Korver | Christopher Hughes II | 1999–2001 |
| Wally Kurth | Sam Hutchins | 2007–2008 |
| Swoosie Kurtz | Ellie Bradley | 1991 |
| Jennifer Landon | Gwen Norbeck Munson | 2005–2008, 2010 |
| Jennifer Landon | Cleo Babbitt | 2007 |
| Lisby Larson | Mary Hopkins Campbell | 1993 |
| John Lasell | Dr. Michael Shea | 1966 |
| Laurence Lau | Brian Wheatley | 2008–2009 |
| Craig Lawlor | Adam Munson | 1998–2002 |
| Lisa Lawrence | Sarah Kasnoff | 1996 |
| Christian LeBlanc | Kirk McColl | 1983–1985 |
| Christian LeBlanc | Michael Baldwin | 2005 |
| William Lee | Grandpa Hughes | 1956 |
| Guenia Lemos | Ruby Frank | 2001 |
| Terry Lester | Royce Keller | 1992–1994 |
| Ben Levin | Gabriel Caras | 2010 |
| Michael Levin | John Eldridge | 1991-1992 |
| Bunny Levine | Hospital announcer VO | 1999 |
| Mark Kevin Lewis | Gregory Varner | 1993–1994 |
| Jon Lindstrom | Craig Montgomery | 2008–2010 |
| Peyton List | Lucy Montgomery | 2001–2005 |
| Peyton R. List | Little girl in diner | 2002 |
| D.J. Lockhart-Johnson | Coleman "Doc" Reese | 2004 |
| Kristanna Loken | Danielle Andropoulos | 1994 |
| John Loprieno | Brad Snyder | 1999 |
| Lisa Loring | Cricket Montgomery | 1981-1983 |
| Michael Louden | Duke Kramer | 1989–1991, 1994 |
| Don MacLaughlin | Chris Hughes Sr. | 1956–1986 |
| Neil Maffin | Beau Farrell | 1988–1989 |
| Billy Magnussen | Casey Hughes | 2008–2010 |
| Larkin Malloy | Dr Weston | 2002 |
| Larkin Malloy | Radio Announcer | 2006 |
| Daniel Manche | J.J. Larrabee | 2005–2009 |
| Randolph Mantooth | Hal Munson | 2003–2005 |
| Daniel Markel | David Stenbeck | 1997–1998 |
| Nathaniel Marston | Eddie Silva | 1998–2000 |
| Lauren B. Martin | Camille Bennett | 1997–2000 |
| Marie Masters | Susan Stewart | 1968–1979, 1986–2010 |
| Konrad Matthaei | Grant Colman | 1973–1974 |
| Robin Mattson | Cheri Love | 2007 |
| Donald May | Raymond Speer | 1984 |
| James McCaffrey | Charley Spangler | 2003 |
| Cady McClain | Rosanna Cabot | 2002–2005, 2007–2010 |
| Grayson McCouch | Dusty Donovan | 2003–2010 |
| Lonnie McCullough | Linc Lafferty | 1993 |
| Anne Burr McDermott | Claire English | 1956–59 |
| Colleen McDermott | Emily Stewart | 1986–87 |
| Mary McDonnell | Claudia Colfax | 1980 |
| Lonette McKee | Sara Ruth Bennett | 1997–1999 |
| Jeffrey Meek | Craig Montgomery | 2006–2007 |
| Kelley Menighan | Emily Stewart | 1992–2010 |
| Justine Miceli | Marsha McKay | 1992–1993 |
| Gregory Michael | Clark Watson | 2003–2004 |
| Lynn Milgrim | Orlena Grimaldi | 1995 |
| Judson Mills | Hutch Hutchinson | 1991–1993 |
| Matthew Mindler | Halloween Boy | 2009 |
| Philip Moon | Tuan Ly | 1988 |
| Julianne Moore | Frannie Hughes | 1985–1988, 2010 |
| Julianne Moore | Sabrina Hughes | 1986–1988 |
| Marissa Morell | Emily Stewart | 1979 |
| Haviland Morris | Bridget Lawson | 2010 |
| Matthew Morrison | Adam Munson | 2006 |
| Michael David Morrison | Caleb Snyder | 1988–1993 |
| Robin Morse | Pamela Wagner | 1987–1989 |
| Burke Moses | Sean Baxter | 1989–1991, 1994 |
| Ming-Na | Lien Hughes | 1988–1991 |
| Michael Nader | Kevin Thompson | 1975–1978 |
| Hugo Napier | Gunnar St. Clair | 1982–1984 |
| Alexandra Neil | Dawn Wheeler | 1993–1995 |
| James Noble | Donald Hughes | 1962 |
| Glynnis O'Connor | Dee Stewart | 1973 |
| Glynnis O'Connor | Margo Hughes | 1993–1994 |
| Paul O'Keefe | Dan Stewart | 1962–1963 |
| Kim Onasch | Jennifer Munson | 1999–2002 |
| Tracy O'Neil | Frannie Hughes | 1980–1981 |
| Santos Ortega | Grandpa Hughes | 1956–1976 |
| Giulia Pagano | Marsha Talbot | 1986–1987 |
| Isabella Palmieri | Natalie Snyder | 2009–2010 |
| Annie Parisse | Julia Snyder | 1998–2002 |
| Michael Park | Jack Snyder | 1997–2010 |
| Corey Parker | Bully | 1983 |
| Peter Parros | Ben Harris | 1996–2005, 2009 |
| Austin Peck | Brad Snyder | 2007–2009 |
| Tom Pelphrey | Mick Dante | 2009–2010 |
| Lisa Peluso | Lila Hart | 1999 |
| Beverly Penberthy | Adelaide Fitzgibbons | 1989 |
| Leslie Perkins | Susan Stewart | 1968 |
| Valerie Perrine | Delores Pierce | 1998–1999 |
| Yvonne Perry | Rosanna Cabot | 1992–1996, 1998–1999 |
| Bronson Picket | Diego Santana | 1996–1997 |
| Tonya Pinkins | Heather Dalton | 1983–1986 |
| Julie Pinson | Janet Ciccone | 2008–2010 |
| Mark Pinter | Brian McColl | 1984–1987, 1990 |
| Danny Pintauro | Paul Ryan | 1983–1984 |
| Nat Polen | Douglas Cassen | 1956–1967 |
| Scott Porter | Casey Hughes | 2006–2007 |
| Parker Posey | Tess Shelby | 1991–1992 |
| Jane Powell | Lisa Grimaldi | 1990s |
| Jill Powell | Marcy Breen Lafferty | 1991–1994 |
| Leona Powers | Thelma Turner | 1956–1957 |
| Susan Pratt | Charlotte Lindsey | 1999 |
| Simon Prebble | Martin Chedwyn | 1996 |
| Jon Prescott | Mike Kasnoff | 2008 |
| Rosemary Prinz | Penny Hughes | 1956–68, 1985–1988, 1993, 1998, 2000–2001 |
| Renee Props | Ellie Snyder | 1988–1992 |
| Keith Pruitt | Frank Wendall | 1990 |
| Sara Ramirez | Hannah Bulut | 2003 |
| Mary Linda Rapeleye | Margaret Crawford Andropoulos | 1980–1985 |
| Heather Rattray | Lily Walsh Snyder | 1989–1993 |
| Vanessa Ray | Teri Ciccone | 2009–10 |
| James Rebhorn | Henry Lange | 1988–91 |
| Peter Reckell | Eric Hollister | 1980–1982 |
| William Redfield | Tim Cole | 1958 |
| Margaret Reed | Shannon O'Hara | 1985–1990, 1994–1995 |
| Scott Reeves | Himself | 2005 |
| Frances Reid | Grace Baker | 1959–1962 |
| John Reilly | Dan Stewart | 1974–1976 |
| Portia Reiners | Ada Dunne | 2006 |
| Pat Reynolds | Emily Stewart | 1973–1975 |
| Joanna Rhinehart | Jessica Griffin | 1995–1999 |
| Allyson Rice-Taylor | Connor Walsh | 1990–1997 |
| Barbara Rodell | Joyce Colman | 1973–1981 |
| Zach Roerig | Casey Hughes | 2005–2007 |
| Judi Rolin | Barbara Ryan | 1971 |
| Denis Romer | Doug Campbell | 1979 |
| Bonnie Root | Eve Coleman | 2006 |
| Emmy Rossum | Abigail Williams | 1997 |
| Todd Rotondi | Bryant Montgomery | 2000–2001 |
| Richard Roundtree | Oliver Travers | 2002-2003 |
| Sam Rovin | Jerry Wheeler | 1992-1994 |
| Jada Rowland | Susan Stewart | 1967–1968 |
| Jeffrey Rowland | Dan Stewart | 1965 |
| Lamman Rucker | T. Marshall Travers | 2002–2003 |
| Frank Runyeon | Steve Andropoulos | 1980–1986 |
| Amy Ryan | Renee | 1990 |
| Meg Ryan | Betsy Stewart | 1982–1984 |
| Mark Rydell | Jeff Baker | 1956–1962 |
| Janine Sagar | Emily Stewart | 1972–1973 |
| Lea Salonga | Lien Hughes | 2001, 2003 |
| Roselyn Sanchez | Pilar Domingo | 1996–1997 |
| Sam Schacht | Dr. Rampf | 1995 |
| Marnie Schulenburg | Alison Stewart | 2007–2010 |
| Connie Scott | Susan Stewart | 1966–1967 |
| Paolo Seganti | Damian Grimaldi | 1993-97, 2001, 2006, 2008-2010 |
| Amanda Seyfried | Lucy Montgomery | 2000–2001 |
| Bill Shanks | Casey Peretti | 1986–1990 |
| Monti Sharp | Lewis McCloud | 1997–1998 |
| Martin Sheen | Jack Davis | 1965–1970 |
| John Wesley Shipp | Doug Cummings | 1985–1986 |
| Charles Siebert | Wally Matthews | 1972–1974 |
| Christian Siefert | Christopher Hughes II | 1992–1998 |
| Jake Silbermann | Noah Mayer | 2007–2010 |
| Heather Simms | Nurse Jacobs | 2005–2006 |
| Kristina Sisco | Abigail Williams | 1999–2002 |
| Deidre Skiles | Danielle Andropoulos | 2008 |
| Alfe Smith | Andrew Dixon | 1982 |
| Kerr Smith | Ryder Hughes | 1996–1997 |
| Melanie Smith | Emily Stewart | 1987–1992 |
| Rex Smith | Darryl Crawford | 1990–1992 |
| Susan Marie Snyder | Julie Wendall Snyder | 1989–1995, 1998, 2002 |
| Jesse Soffer | Will Munson | 2004–2008, 2010 |
| Gillian Spencer | Jennifer Hughes | 1972–1975, 1997 |
| Chris Stack | Walt | 2006 |
| Brian Starcher | Hank Elliot | 1988–1990 |
| Eric Sheffer Stevens | Reid Oliver | 2010 |
| Count Stovall | Roy Franklin | 1986–1989 |
| Barbara Stranger | Barbara Ryan | 1971 |
| Anna Stuart | Donna Love | 1999–2002 |
| Mary Ellen Stuart | Frannie Hughes | 1989–1992 |
| Hal Studer | Donald Hughes | 1956 |
| Joris Stuyck | Gavin Kruger | 1990 |
| Michael Swan | Duncan McKechnie | 1986–1995, 2001–02 |
| Anne Sward | Lyla Montgomery Peretti | 1980–1993, 2000 |
| Paul Taylor | Isaac Jenkins | 1999–2003 |
| Richard Thomas | Tom Hughes | 1966–67 |
| Marisa Tomei | Marcy Thompson Cushing | 1983–1985 |
| Patrick Tovatt | Cal Stricklyn | 1988–1998, 2001 |
| Tamara Tunie | Jessica Griffin | 1987–1995, 1999–2007, 2009 |
| Mark Tymchyshyn | Gavin Kruger | 1990–1992 |
| Helene Udy | Frannie Hughes | 1982–1983 |
| Kim Johnston Ulrich | Diana McColl | 1983–1986 |
| Terri VandenBosch | Frannie Hughes | 1983–1984 |
| James Van Der Beek | Stephen Anderson | 1995 |
| Joyce Van Patten | Janice Turner | 1956–1957 |
| Robert Vaughn | Rick Hamlin | 1995 |
| Helen Wagner | Nancy Hughes | 1956–2010 |
| Diana Walker | Susan Stewart | 1967 |
| Rita Walter | Carol Stallings | 1972–1982 |
| Alexander Walters | Mark Kasnoff | 1995–1997 |
| Donna Wandrey | Barbara Ryan | 1971–1972 |
| Billy Warlock | Anthony Blackthorn | 2010 |
| Gertrude Warner | Claire English | 1960 |
| Ruth Warrick | Edith Hughes Frye | 1956–1960, 1963 |
| Greg Watkins | Evan Walsh III | 1991–1995 |
| Steven Weber | Kevin Gibson | 1985–1986 |
| Liza Weil | Student | 1995 |
| Cliff Weissman | Ellroy Nevins | 1992–1993 |
| Ronnie Welch | Bob Hughes | 1958–1960 |
| Mary K. Wells | Louise Cole | 1958 |
| Doug Wert | Scott Eldridge | 1995–1996 |
| Martin West | Donald Hughes | 1976–1978 |
| Maura West | Carly Snyder | 1995–2010 |
| Ellen Wheeler | Marley Love | 2000–2003 |
| Alan White | Christopher Hughes II | 2002 |
| Isiah Whitlock Jr. | Dr. Phalen | 1992 |
| Nancy Wickwire | Claire English | 1960–1964 |
| Kathleen Widdoes | Emma Snyder | 1985–2010 |
| Tom Wiggin | Kirk Anderson | 1988–1998 |
| Ashley Williams | Danielle Andropoulos | 1994–1996 |
| Darnell Williams | Jack Devere | 1994–1995 |
| Graham Winton | Caleb Snyder | 1993–1995, 1998, 2002 |
| Marie Wilson | Meg Snyder | 2005–2010 |
| Sarah Wilson | Liberty Ciccone | 2010 |
| James Wlcek | Linc Lafferty | 1990–1992 |
| Michael Woods | Alec Wallace | 1999 |
| Damian Young | Ross Kreeger | 2006 |
| Janet Zarish | Natalie Bannon | 1981 |
| Colleen Zenk | Barbara Ryan | 1978–2010 |
| Karen Ziemba | Aurora Hunter | 2009 |
| Dan Ziskie | Woody Hutchinson | 1991–93 |
| Adonis Kapsalis | Rex | 2007 |
