= Casey Hughes =

Character from the soap opera As the World Turns

- As the World Turns character
- Billy Magnussen as Casey Hughes
- Portrayed by: Cruise Russo (1991–1999); Joseph Cross (1999–2004); Ian Boyd (2004); Peter Vack (2004); Zach Roerig (2005–2007); Scott Porter (2006; temp.); Billy Magnussen (2008–2010)
- Duration: 1991–2010
- First appearance: February 1991
- Last appearance: September 17, 2010
- Created by: Douglas Marland
- Introduced by: Laurence Caso
- Zach Roerig as Casey Hughes
In-universe information
- Occupation: Janitor; Barman; Personal Assistant; Disc jockey; Lead guitarist of The Oakdale Five
- Parents: Tom Hughes; Margo Montgomery Hughes
- Siblings: Lien Hughes; Adam Munson; Daniel Hughes
- Spouse: Emily Stewart (2008)
- Children: Billy Norbeck
- Grandparents: Bob Hughes; Lisa Grimaldi; John Dixon; Lyla Montgomery
- Aunts and uncles: Frannie Hughes; Sabrina Hughes; Christopher Hughes II; Scott Eldridge; Chuckie Shea; Duke Kramer; Andy Dixon; M.J. Dixon; Johnny Dixon; Craig Montgomery; Cricket Montgomery Ross; Katie Peretti
- First cousins: Hope Dixon; Bryant Montgomery; Lucy Montgomery; Johnny Montgomery; Billy Ross; Suzie Ross

Casey Robert Hughes is a fictional character on the soap opera As the World Turns. He is the only child of Margo Montgomery and Tom Hughes. He was last played by Zach Roerig from January 18, 2005 to May 2, 2007. From January 29, 2008 to the series' last episode on September 17, 2010, newcomer Billy Magnussen played the role.

== Storylines ==
Casey Robert Hughes, is the only son of Tom and Margo, born on Valentine's Day in 1991 and named after Casey Peretti, Margo's late stepfather, to whom she was very close and Tom's father Bob Hughes. Casey was always a quiet, well-behaved boy who had a good relationship with his parents, and hated it whenever they fought. When he found out that his mother had an affair with a former football player, Doc Reese, Casey decided to go live with his father. Tom forced Casey to talk with his mother, however, and he had to live at home again. Soon after, his parents got back together again.

At age 16, Casey met a girl named Celia Ortega and despite her brother's arguments, the two started to date. Despite the fact that Casey loved being with Celia, he started to freak out whenever she was around the new waitress Gwen Norbeck. After a couple of months, Casey and Gwen had a one-night stand at a party and Casey was embarrassed by it because Celia always talked about marrying as a virgin. Things changed when Gwen turned out to be pregnant with Casey's child. Knowing this would hurt Celia, who he had a secret crush on, Casey's best friend, William Munson said he was the baby's father. Casey was shaken when Celia broke up with him and started a relationship with Will. However, only after a few weeks, Celia left Oakdale to be with her family in Montega.

Though the girl they both had a crush on had left town, a war was already started between the two. Will hinted to Casey that he was the father, and was angry Casey was lying about it. Casey, however, acted like nothing was going on and told the entire neighborhood that Gwen was a cheap girl who had sex with everyone. After Gwen gave birth to her son at the hospital, her baby was given to Rosanna Cabot and Craig Montgomery, who she had chosen to adopt her son. However, Rosanna was in a car accident and slipped into a coma, while Craig was in jail for causing the accident. Rosanna's sister Carly Tenney-Snyder took custody over the boy, Rory Cabot, but that wasn't what Gwen wanted. In order to get him back, she had to prove to be stable enough and to give a father's name. She pointed out that Casey was the father and a paternity test was administered.

Margo and Tom both asked their son if he was the father. Convinced that Will was, but scared that he might be the father, Casey told them he wasn't the father; he never even had sex with Gwen. Margo took him for his word, but Tom doubted his answer. However, in court, the results came back negative and showed that Casey was not the father. Confused with the results, but happy that he was "right" all along, Casey was cleared by the court. Casey told Gwen and Will that they ruined his life and that Will wasn't his friend anymore.

Casey was left alone by them, giving him his normal life back. However, Casey changed into a completely different person, dating one girl after another. He then met Madeline "Maddie" Coleman, who had just arrived in Oakdale. Both couldn't stand each other and were shocked to learn that Maddie was going to live with them. In the following weeks, Casey and Maddie tried to avoid each other as much as possible. However, when Maddie got into trouble with her boss, B.J. Green, Casey helped her, which ended in exposing the kidnapping of Henry Coleman, Maddie's older brother. After spending so much time together, Casey and Maddie became really close, though their moments were often ruined by bad timing and the wrong words.

Then, the truth about Gwen's baby finally came out, which was that Gwen's baby was switched at the hospital with Jennifer Munson's baby. Casey's paternity test was negative because the wrong baby was tested; Casey was in fact the father of Gwen's baby. Unfortunately, Casey and Gwen's baby died at the hospital on the night he was born. Tom, and mostly Margo, were disappointed by their son and his lies. They punished him by not letting him go to college in a different state, forcing him to stay at local college "Oakdale Latin". Maddie revealed that she would miss him if he had gone to another state. In a moment of spontaneity, Casey kissed her, but Maddie refused his advances.

When Casey discovered that Maddie was helping Will and Gwen, who were running from the cops due to a crime they didn't commit, Casey helped her once again. After their names were cleared, Casey rebuilt his friendship with Will and Gwen. At the police station, Maddie and Casey almost shared a kiss, but were interrupted by Margo. Later at "Java" they became close again, but, again, were interrupted by Margo. The same day, they finally kissed, giving into their feelings. However, Margo caught them some days later, making out on the couch. Margo reminded her son what happened the last time he was "making out", while Casey tried to convince his mom they were just kissing. After Margo caught them a second time, she told Maddie to leave the house, unable to accept that Casey has a relationship with the girl who lived under her roof, talking Casey's grandmother Lisa Grimaldi into taking Maddie in at the Lakeview. Around that time, Lisa informed Casey and Maddie that she was opening a teen-oriented nightclub, Crash, and wanted to offer Casey a position there as D.J. (She also asked Gwen to perform there on opening night.)

Meanwhile, Casey and Maddie kept seeing each other. When Casey and Maddie ended up on the bed, Maddie became quiet and shut down, unable to tell Casey why. She even broke up with him. Casey was heartbroken but wanted to show Maddie he was over her, so he started dating Lia McDermott again, an old girlfriend. The next day, Lia was found dead in a shower cabin, stabbed to death with a knife. Everyone pointed Maddie out as the suspect and she was arrested. Her brother Henry and sister Eve arrived at the station to clear her name and Maddie was released. When Maddie's ex-boyfriend Nate was found dead as well, Maddie was taken by the cops again, this time to their cell beneath the Oakdale PD. Maddie was shocked to learn that her own sister, Eve, thought she might be guilty. However, more teenagers were killed, clearing Maddie's name since she had no connection to any of them. Casey realized that someone was after all of them and went to the woods, where a few cabins were rented for vacation. Along with Gwen and other friends, Casey was trying to leave everything in Oakdale behind. However, the killer had followed them, killing more teens. After everyone split up and ran for their lives, Maddie's sister was revealed to be the killer.

In the hospital, Maddie told Casey why she was so scared to have sex with him; she was raped once by someone she thought to be her friend. Casey was hurt by Maddie's tears and touched by her confession that she loved him. Casey told her that he loved her back and they renewed their relationship. Everything was going great between Maddie and Casey, until Casey and Will's older brother Adam Munson came to town. Adam had become a music producer, offering Gwen a chance to make some demos. Despite Gwen's relationship with Adam's brother Will, Adam fell in love with her. When Casey gambled on the internet and had a major debt to pay, Casey stole Will's trust fund in order to pay. Adam framed Will for the theft, so he had to go to jail and Adam could have Gwen all to himself. His plan backfired when Casey confessed that he had stolen stocks belonging to Will from the safe at Crash to pay off a gambling debt. He was arrested by Jack Snyder. As a minor and the son of a cop, Casey was released with bail and could go back home, as long as he didn't leave Oakdale until his trial was over.

That same night, Adam was forced by his two brothers to leave Oakdale, a chance to escape jail time. Adam called Gwen, begging her to come to the forest to say goodbye. There, he confessed his love and tried to kiss her, when he was suddenly hit from behind by Maddie, who thought he tried to rape her. Scared that they killed him, Gwen and Maddie dug a grave and buried Adam, unaware that he was still alive. The next couple of days, both Maddie and Gwen were stalked by someone. To escape their fate in jail, Gwen, Maddie and Will planned to leave Oakdale and Casey decided to come along to be near Maddie. Adam turned out to be alive and locked Casey and Will in a cabin and knocked Maddie unconscious. He tried to rape Gwen, but he stopped by Casey and Will, who were able to break free. Gwen and Casey stopped Will from killing Adam. Casey and Will told their brother Adam to leave and never return again. In the cabin, more than a year after they met, Casey and Maddie finally had sex for the first time, after she confessed that it was her sister's husband who raped her.

Back in Oakdale, Casey was taken into custody immediately, as he was not supposed to leave Oakdale while out on bail. Casey's trial was moved up and the jury sentenced him to six months in jail. Casey and Maddie promised to write and call each other every week and Casey was taken to jail.

In the following weeks, Maddie and Casey wrote to each other and sent videos to their cell phones. However, three months after Casey was taken to jail, he told Maddie that he was not good enough for her so she should move on. Maddie was heartbroken and in a painful moment, she had sex with the new WOAK intern, Noah Mayer. Maddie felt guilty because of Casey, but was unaware that she was also hurting her best friend Luke Snyder, who was in love with Noah. Noah told Maddie he would like to see her again and in a desperate decision to move on with her life, Maddie started dating Noah.

Casey was released early from jail, where he had a rough time. He visited his grandfather Bob and went to see Gwen and Will and their baby Hallie. Soon after his release, Casey's grandmother, Lisa thrilled that he had been released, and aware of his potential difficulties in finding a job due to his prison record, gave him a job as a bartender at the Lakeview.

Casey then unwillingly pretended to be Luke Snyder's boyfriend, in a bid to keep Ameera Ali Aziz in the United States. Casey had a crush on Ameera but her visa was out of date, so she married Luke's boyfriend, Noah Mayer. Homeland security became suspicious when they found Casey and Ameera hanging out together, so Luke pretended that Casey was gay. After finding out that Ameera had feelings for Noah, Casey decided to stop playing along with the charade and told Luke about Ameera's true feelings. Casey was fired from the Lakeview for being late. After hanging out around the house for a while, Casey got offered the job of being Emily Stewart's personal assistant, of which Margo disapproved. Not long after starting at the Intruder, Casey was held captive with Emily in her office by a judge wanting revenge for an article Emily had published. Luckily, Casey managed to stay cool and keep the judge from hurting anyone. Margo voiced her disapproval, so Emily fired Casey. After a run-in with Margo, Emily confronted Tom and told him to make Margo back off. Tom managed to get Margo to accept Casey's choices. Casey convinced Emily to rehire him.

Shortly thereafter, Casey confessed to Emily that while he had worked at the Lakeview he had stolen money from the register to pay off the guard who had arranged for his early release from prison (resulting in another bartender's having been blamed for the theft and fired). Emily convinced Casey to confess to his grandmother that it was in fact he who took the money. Lisa was devastated to learn that her grandson had yet again stolen from her, and torn over not wanting to keep the news from Tom and Margo, knowing Margo, as a cop, would need to arrest Casey for violating the terms of his parole. In the end she did tell Tom and Margo. Margo decided not to have Casey arrested, but under the stipulation that he stop seeing Emily, and that he enroll in college.

Soon, there were sexual tensions between Casey and Emily, after he had seen her naked in her office. They had sex, which they continued to have, despite fearing someone might find out. After a while, their feelings grew deeper and admitting their love for each other. When Margo found out, she was outraged and demanded Emily to stay away from her son. This only brought the two of them closer and in a moment of spontaneity, Emily asked Casey to marry her. They did, but soon after they came back to Oakdale, Emily had no memory of the proposal or the ceremony and wondered what had gotten into her. She dumped Casey, who was shaken by this. Not much later, they got back together, but then Emily collapsed in front of Margo and she was taken to the hospital. While being there, Casey suddenly had a psychotic episode and was admitted to the hospital as well. More patients, such as Meg Ryan, Alison Stewart and Chris Hughes were admitted as well and a plaque was discovered. Chris found out someone was poisoning them, and it brought out different kinds of emotions in everyone. Casey got very aggressive every time he wanted something. When he asked for a nurse to bring his wife with him, she refused, to which Casey became very outraged and tried to kill the nurse. Margo, at that point, had realized Casey truly loved Emily, and brought Emily to Casey's bed, where not much later, Tom had given his blessings for their marriage.

After the antidote for the poison was found and injected, everyone was discharged from the hospital and Emily wanted an annulment. Casey refused, but Emily insisted, saying she wanted a relationship, not a marriage. These were the first fractures in their relationship. Casey agreed to go ahead with the annulment, but admitted to his parents he loved being married to Emily. A couple of weeks later, the subject "children" coincidentally came up and Casey admitted he would love to have children and he wanted Emily to be their mother. Emily got scared and said she needed to think. However, the next day, Casey discovered she had gone to the hospital to sterilize herself and therefore wouldn't be able to have kids anymore. Casey was outraged that she made this decision without him and when Emily went through with the procedure anyway, he broke up with her. Emily believed they would be all right soon again, but it changed when presumed dead Dusty Donovan returned to town, with whom she had a short fling before his so-called death. They picked of where they left off, exactly three days after she and Casey broke up.

Casey was devastated by this, but tried to get on with his life. He started to hang out more again with Luke and Noah and Emily's sister Ali joined them as well, in the campaign Luke had at his school. Casey now spends more time with Ali, who was recently divorced, and he is slowly starting to move on again with his life, accepting he and Emily weren't right for each other.

Casey becomes Luke's campaign manager when he runs for student government president. He makes it clear that he's not above using underhanded tactics in order to win, including using Alison as a spy for the other side. When Alison's deception is discovered, she's kidnapped by masked men on Halloween, taken to a dorm room and forced to strip as they videotape her. Casey comes to her rescue, attacking Mark, the man they believe to be the main perpetrator. As a result, Casey is arrested, although he avoids charges and is released after having spent the night in prison. However, he soon finds out he's suspended from school for the assault.

On the final election day, Casey stuffs the ballot box so that Luke wins. Noah has a crisis of conscious and tells the dean that Luke cheated, and Luke is expelled from college. Casey reprimands Noah, then confesses his crime to the dean, claiming that he acted alone and that Luke did nothing wrong. The dean then expels Casey as well.

Casey is afraid of telling his parents and puts it off for a while. Alison shows up at his house to help him search for jobs. Casey admits that he has no idea what to do with his life, and Ali tries to help him figure it out. She tells him to picture himself doing something that excites him, then make his move. Casey tries to kiss her. Alison pulls away and says she values their friendship and doesn't want to take it any further.

On Thanksgiving, Casey persuades Alison to help him break the news of his expulsion to his parents. Alison does help explain the situation to Margo and Tom, who are more disappointed than angry. Emily shows up to spend Thanksgiving with the Hughes and flirts with Casey, saying that she still cares about him. By this time Casey has gotten over her. Emily then leaves and the Hughes and Alison enjoy a happy Thanksgiving dinner despite the circumstances.

Later Tom puts his foot down and tells Casey to either get a job or move out. Casey gets a job as a janitor at the hospital where Alison works. Alison is given the assignment of looking after a college student who overdosed on drugs, and is horrified to realize that it's Mark, the man who kidnapped and sexually harassed her. Mark has a psychotic episode and escapes to the hospital roof, planning to jump. Alison and Casey are tempted to let him jump, but Casey manages to save him. Alison is moved by his efforts and the two grow closer as a result of the incident.

Casey's world is turned upside down when an unexpected guest arrives at his home; Maddie. She's back for the holidays and though Casey seems glad to see her, he has no idea what to do. While they're talking, Alison arrives in order to drive him to work. Maddie, clearly jealous of them, leaves immediately. Casey is hesitant to give his relationship with Maddie another chance, but Alison convinces him to try it. Casey sets up a date with Maddie, thinking they're going out, but it turns out Maddie prefers to stay in. When she pressures Casey to have sex with her, Casey points out that they haven't seen each other for two years and need more time to get better acquainted. Maddie reluctantly agrees and they plan a date for New Year's.

Meanwhile, Alison receives a text message from Lucy Montgomery, who's back in Oakdale in search of a bone marrow transplant for her brother Johnny. Alison agrees to test possible donors secretly. She reserves a room at the Lakeview for Lucy and Johnny under her name. She arrives at the Hughes' house to get a sample from Casey, where he tells her of his plans for his New Year's Eve date with Maddie. Alison, clearly jealous, claims that she has a date for New Year's Eve as well, with a man she works with.

On New Year's Eve, while Lucy and Johnny are out for a walk, Alison is alone in the Lakeview room. Casey, who plans to meet Maddie later, sees her enter the Lakeview and follows her upstairs, wanting to know the truth about her plans for New Year's Eve. He doesn't believe Alison when she says she got the hotel room for her and her date. Finally, out of frustration, she says she got the room in the hopes that Casey would want to spend the night with her. When Casey doesn't believe her, she kisses him to convince him it's true. They end up on the bed with Casey naked and Alison in her underwear, but she pulls away and gets out of bed before they can have sex. She says she doesn't want to have sex with him while lying to him. Casey expresses disappointment that she's keeping secrets from him but is understanding and doesn't pressure her. Alison promises to tell him the truth when the time is right, and they part amiably.

Maddie, who had to stop at her brother Henry's hotel room to get her cell phone, hears Casey and Alison together in the room. She later meets Casey downstairs and, crying, tells him she knows he's having sex with Alison.

Days later, Casey hypnotizes Maddie at Al's Diner and then tries to convince her that nothing happened between him and Alison. Maddie is angry and irrational and refuses to hear it, convinced that Casey has a thing for Alison. Later Casey meets Alison at the park and tells her that he and Maddie aren't right for each other because he's not good enough for her. He also expresses a desire to start a relationship with Ali. Alison is afraid of having a relationship with Casey and insists that he gets back together with Maddie. She approaches Maddie outside Al's Diner and tells her she and Casey are just friends. Maddie is not convinced and walks away. Alison then tells Casey that what happened on New Year's Eve meant nothing. Casey is clearly hurt by this but lets it go.

Later Alison and Casey scheme to get their broken-up friends, Luke and Noah, back together. Alison approaches Luke and claims that she's unsure whether Casey likes her as more than a friend, then asks him to speak to Casey for her and find out. Casey approaches Noah with the same issue, and they lure the couple to the hospital's roof and lock them out. While they're waiting for Luke and Noah to reconcile, Casey reveals some acquired maturity, claiming that he's seeking a substantial relationship rather than a brief fling. Alison responds skeptically but is intrigued by this change of attitude and shows more willingness to take a chance with him. When Casey and Jade Taylor plan to get Luke and Noah back together, Alison witnesses the two laughing together and assumes Casey likes her, and starts giving him the cold shoulder.
