= Ottawa Hills High School =

Ottawa Hills High School may refer to:

- Ottawa Hills High School (Michigan)
- Ottawa Hills High School (Ohio)
