= Emily Stewart =

Fictional character from As the World Turns

- As the World Turns character
- Kelley Menighan Hensley as Emily Stewart
- Portrayed by: Janine Sagar (1972–1973); Pat Reynolds (1973–1975); Jenny Harris (1975–1979); Marissa Morell (1979); Colleen McDermott (1986–1987); Melanie Smith (1987–1992); Kelley Menighan Hensley (1992–2010)
- Duration: 1972–1979; 1986–2010
- First appearance: April 1972
- Last appearance: September 17, 2010
- Created by: David Lesan and Irna Phillips
- Introduced by: Fred Bartholomew (1972); Robert Calhoun (1986)
- Crossover appearances: The Young and the Restless
In-universe information
- Occupation: Owner and publisher of The Intruder; Freelance journalist Former Journalist at The Argus; Former Editor of The City Times; Former Executive at Walsh Enterprises; Former Executive at Montgomery & Associates; Former Employee at Fashions Ltd.
- Parents: Dan Stewart; Susan Stewart
- Siblings: Betsy Stewart; Alison Stewart (adoptive)
- Spouse: Holden Snyder (1986–1988); Hal Munson (2002–2005); Paul Ryan (2006, 2009–present); Casey Hughes (2008)
- Children: Alison Stewart; Lyon Hunter; Daniel Hughes; Jennifer Ryan
- Grandparents: Tim Cole; Ellen Lowell Stewart; David Stewart (adoptive); Fred Burke; Julia Burke
- Aunts and uncles: Annie Stewart Ward; Dawn "Dee" Stewart; Paul Stewart (adoptive)
- Nieces and nephews: Danielle Andropolous
- First cousins: Gregory Ward; Lowell Ward; Maria Ward; Nancy Ward; Stewart Cushing

Emily Stewart is a fictional character from As the World Turns, an American soap opera on the CBS network. She has been portrayed by Kelley Menighan Hensley since July 1992. 10 years later, the actress received her first Daytime Emmy Award nomination for Outstanding Supporting Actress. The character briefly appeared on the CBS soap, The Young and the Restless in March 2007, when she went to ask Amber Moore about finding her sister and biological daughter, Alison Stewart.

== Storylines ==
Emily Stewart is the daughter of Dan and Susan Stewart. They divorced soon after she was born. She goes to live with her father, but after a custody battle between Dan and Susan in which Dan won, she goes back and forth between them. Emily's life wasn't very stable; her mother was an alcoholic, and when she was eight years old, her father died. Susan and Emily later left town, but Emily came back to Oakdale when she was 17. A very young Emily found herself falling in love with James Stenbeck and she became pregnant. She had already decided she wanted nothing more to do with James. Therefore, she had a brief relationship with Holden Snyder and she led him to believe that the baby was his, leading to him marrying her. They divorced soon after she miscarried her baby and Holden learned the truth.

Later, Emily met Brock Lombard, who was a mobster. At this time, Emily offered a summer job to a young Paul Stenbeck, who was the son of Barbara Ryan. One night, after she and Brock had a big argument, Paul stopped by her house. She was upset about the argument, and without thinking, she and Paul had sex. Paul was a virgin. He developed deep feelings for Emily, and when his father, James Stenbeck, found out about the situation, he was furious with Emily. Paul came by and heard the argument between his father and Emily. Trying to protect Emily, he grabbed a gun and shot his father. Soon after, Brock reformed from being a mobster. Emily told Brock about the incident with Paul and his father. Brock forgave Emily and planned to be with her forever when someone from the mob shot him. Brock was found dead.

Emily's mother, Susan, wanted to have a baby but was unable to conceive. Emily offered to donate her eggs so Susan could undergo artificial insemination. The procedure was successful and Susan gave birth to a daughter, Alison, but it took a while for Emily to be comfortable with the idea that Alison was her sister, not her daughter.

Emily met Diego Santana, but the affair was disastrous. She stumbled upon some information that led her to believe that he was a mobster making some bad deals. When Diego found out that she knew, he raped her. Devastated, Emily learned to move on. Sometime later, Diego was shot by Kirk Anderson on the day Diego was to marry Lily. Emily had several relationships that just didn't work out. She tried too hard to make it work, but in the end, she was left behind.

Emily fell in love with Tom Hughes, who was married to Margo. Emily felt she could be a better wife and tried to break up his marriage to Margo. She was determined to destroy his marriage and believed that she could get Tom to love her. She later realized it could never be and decided to get on with her life when she finally realized Tom didn't love her. But she was pregnant with Tom's baby and gave birth to a son, Daniel Hughes. Although this affair put tension on Tom and Margo's marriage, they soon patched things up.

Then Emily became involved with Hal Munson. Hal's wife, Barbara, just left him for another man. His world was turned upside down. While dating, Emily went missing. After a long search, it was discovered that Emily, Carly Tenney, and Rose D'Angelo were all kidnapped and taken to another country where they were injected with a serum that would quickly speed up the aging process. Once rescued, the girls looked three times their age. Luckily, Hal and the police department found the man in charge and were able to convince him to give the girls a reverse serum. It worked, and their beautiful faces returned. Hal and Emily's relationship led to marriage. They were happy for a couple of years, but Hal was at the police station most of the time and Emily became lonely, which led to attractions to others, and finally, their marriage ended.

Paul Ryan and Emily became involved in an intimate relationship. At one point, they were both locked up in jail for their involvement in switching Jennifer Munson's baby with Gwen Norbeck's. They decided to get married, and when Emily went to meet Paul to get married, he told her that he had changed his mind and she didn't need to be with someone like him. As he turned to walk away, Emily shot him. Thinking that she had killed him, she tried to get rid of the body. When Paul came back to Oakdale, he won Emily over by telling her that he forgave her. At this time, Emily kidnapped Dusty Donovan, and in order to find him, Paul decided to marry Emily hoping it would help him find out where Dusty was. Finally, Dusty was found and Emily had a breakdown and jumped off a cliff. Emily survived because Paul saved her life; while in the hospital, it was discovered she was pregnant with Paul's child. Instead of being sent to prison, she was sent to an institution for help; she and Paul got a divorce. Before her due date, Emily got caught in a bad storm at the Snyder farm with Meg, who was seeing Paul at the time. She went into labor and there was no way to stop the baby from being born. Meg helped her deliver a little girl. Her daughter died shortly after being born; Paul and Emily named her Jennifer.

During these dark times, Emily became a call girl for Cheri Love, believing she was worthless. Dusty Donovan found out about it and made her see the truth. She left prostitution. Around this time, she realized that Alison was in deep trouble; she was addicted to meth and was doing porn in Las Vegas. Emily and Dusty worked together to save Alison. They managed to get her back to Oakdale, off drugs, and away from the porn career. Emily began to have serious feelings for Dusty but it took him a while to get past her former career as a prostitute. When he finally did, Emily learned that he and Alison had had sympathy sex in Las Vegas. She was crushed and left town.

Emily returned to Oakdale months later with Chris Hughes. They had a steamy relationship, but she wasn't in love with Chris, as she was only trying to get back at Dusty. Dusty and Chris butted heads from the moment he returned, and on New Year's Eve, Emily couldn't deny her true feelings and had sex with Dusty in his car. She said it couldn't happen again and tried to keep the secret from Chris. Lily, who was having an affair with Dusty at the time, learned of Emily's prostitution soon after Dusty's death and outed Emily in an anonymous note left for Chris. He couldn't believe she had lied to him and ended their relationship.

Emily tried to make things right with Chris but he wouldn't even talk to her. Because of the situation, Emily became a suspect in Dusty's shooting and subsequent death. It was later learned that Colonel Mayer shot him and that Evan Walsh IV had killed him with an injection to keep him from telling the truth about a research project at the hospital.

Soon after this, Casey Hughes returned to town. He fell for Emily almost immediately but she tried to keep her distance from him. They wound up having sex on a business trip to New York and from then on couldn't keep their hands off one another. Emily tried to end the relationship several times but couldn't. Margo found out about their relationship when she returned early from a weekend away. She threatened to kill Emily but Casey stepped between them. Margo, who found out about the prostitution too, outed Emily to Tom and Casey. Casey already knew and didn't care but Tom was flabbergasted. He threatened to take full custody of Daniel. Casey managed to get through to him and he dropped the case at the last second.

Emily began to act strangely after a bottle of perfume was delivered to her office, but Casey didn't catch on. She convinced him to elope with her but regretted the decision when the drugged perfume wore off. She said she wanted an annulment but then retracted the statement when she was dosed with more perfume. She and Casey became deathly ill because of the perfume, but Chris' antidote saved their lives. Their families finally began to accept Emily and Casey's relationship but Casey wanted more than Emily was ready to give. He was determined to have kids so she decided to have her tubes tied.
