= Ottawa Hills High School (Ohio) =

Public high school in Toledo, Ohio, United States

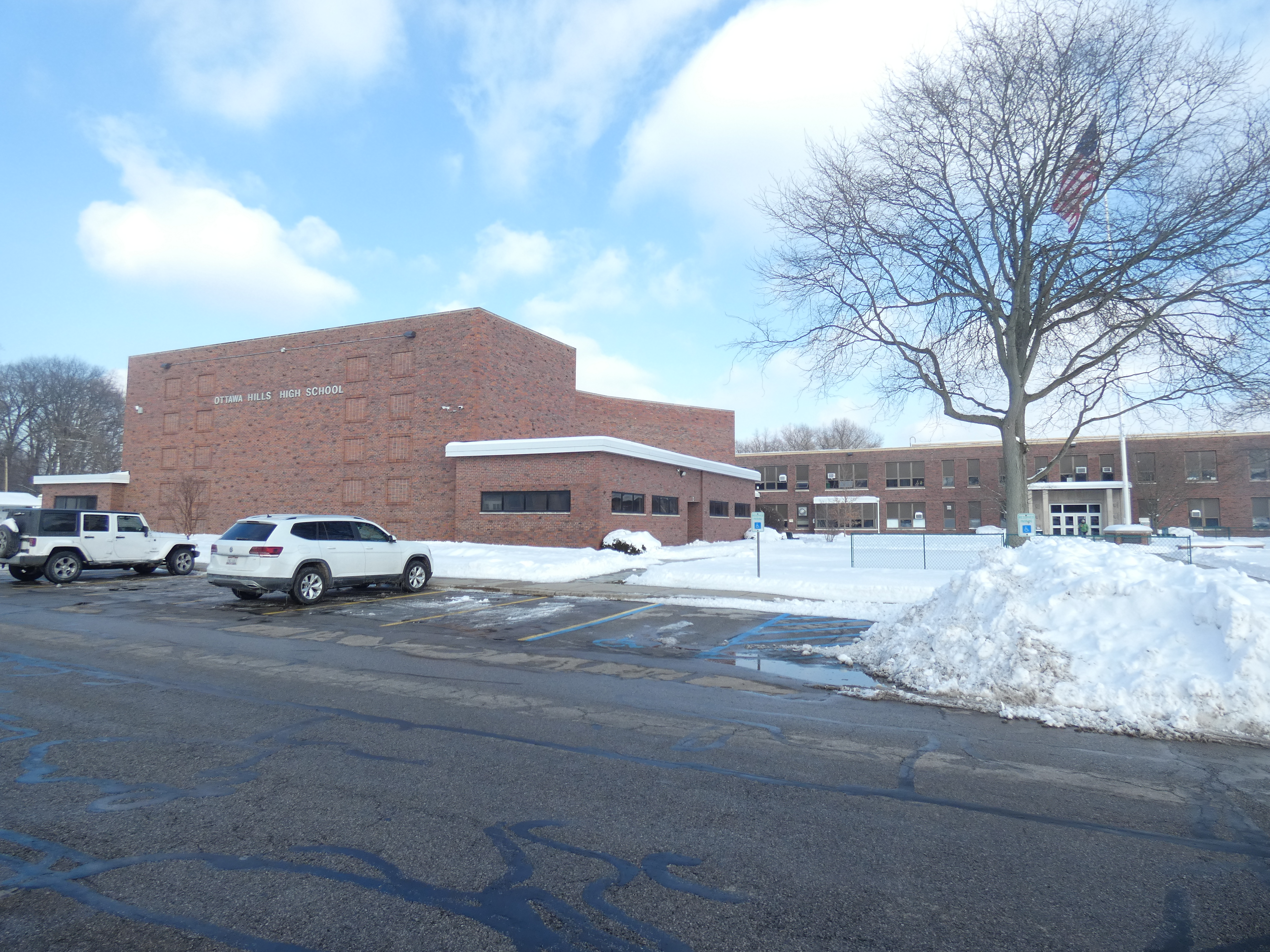
- School's side entrance

Location
- 2532 Evergreen Road; Toledo, (Lucas County), Ohio 43606; United States; 41°40′11″N 83°37′53″W

Information
- Type: Public, Coeducational high school
- School district: Ottawa Hills Local Schools
- Superintendent: Adam Fineske
- Principal: Ben McMurray (Jr./Sr. High School), Jeremy Bauer (Elementary School)
- Teaching staff: 32.74 (FTE)
- Grades: 9-12
- Student to teacher ratio: 14.69
- Colors: Kelly Green and White
- Fight song: Stand Up and Cheer
- Athletics conference: Sandusky Bay Conference
- Mascot: Green Bear (formerly the Green Arrows)
- Team name: Green Bears
- Rival: Toledo Christian
- Accreditation: North Central Association of Colleges and Schools
- Newspaper: The Arrowhead
- Yearbook: Mesasa
- Athletic Director: (Former) Tamara Talmadge
- Website: www.ohschools.org/

Ottawa Hills High School is a public high school in the village of Ottawa Hills, Ohio, United States, just west of Toledo. It is the only high school in the Ottawa Hills Local Schools district. The school's mascot is the Green Bears.

== Appearance ==
The high school is attached to Ottawa Hills Junior High, and as a whole the building is commonly referred to as Ottawa Hills Junior/Senior High School or OHJHS by the villagers. Just outside is a flagpole built by Alumni of OHHS. The Liberty Memorial was added to the area around the flagpole with donations from community members and alumni. The Liberty Memorial was designed by Ottawa Hills resident and architect Todd Kime.

== Teachers ==
80.9% of the school's faculty have advanced degrees and an average teaching experience of 20 years. The school has a 14:1 student-to-teacher ratio as of 2024.

The school credits its staff as the main reason for its good academic standing. The school was awarded by the National Blue Ribbon Schools Program in 2002 and 2004.

== Students ==
The school frequently consists of between 300 and 400 high school students. Known for academics, students at Ottawa Hills excel with a college preparatory curriculum. In 2015, Newsweek ranked Ottawa Hills High School number #1 in Ohio and #45 in the nation.

== Athletics ==
=== State Championships ===
- Boys golf - 2013, 2026
- Boys soccer - 2008
- Girls cross country - 2025
- Girls soccer - 2026

== Notable alumni ==
- Christine Brennan—sports columnist, TV and radio commentator, best-selling author and nationally known speaker is especially known for her coverage of the Olympics
- John Colenback—actor best known for portraying Dan Stewart on As the World Turns
- Evan G. Galbraith—United States Ambassador to France from 1981 to 1985 under Ronald Reagan and the Secretary of Defense Representative to Europe and NATO under Donald Rumsfeld from 2002 to 2007
- Steve Gordon (class of 1957)—screenwriter and director of the 1981 Academy Award-winning film Arthur
- Constance Hauman (class of 1979)—singer-songwriter and actress. She is credited with having the only live recording of Alban Berg's Lulu in the title role, recorded in Copenhagen 1996 at the Queen of Denmark's Castle. Constance Hauman's first full-length release of original songs, Falling Into Now, was chosen by the Guardian UK Music Critic Caroline Sullivan as one of the top 10 best pop albums of 2015.
- Carl Eugene Heiles (class of 1957)—astrophysicist noted for his contribution to the understanding of diffuse interstellar matter through observational radio astronomy
- Jamie O'Hara—country singer/songwriter who wrote the number one Grammy-winning country song of the year "Grandpa (Tell Me 'Bout the Good Ol' Days)" in 1986, performed by the group the Judds
- Daniel H. Overmyer—second-generation warehouse operator, businessman, newspaper publisher, banker and television broadcaster; founder of WDHO-TV and the United Network
- Tom Scholz—rock musician, songwriter, inventor, engineer, and philanthropist, best known as the founder of the band Boston. He is also the inventor of the Rockman portable guitar amplifier. He has been described by Allmusic as "a notoriously 'un-rock n' roll' figure who never enjoyed the limelight of being a performer," preferring to concentrate almost exclusively on his music, and in more recent years, spending much of his time working with charities. Lead guitarist of the band Boston.
- David H. Staelin—astronomer, engineer, and entrepreneur
- Mark D. Wagoner, Jr. (class of 1990)—politician and former Republican member of the Ohio Senate and Ohio House of Representatives
