= Dusty Donovan =

- As the World Turns character
- Portrayed by: Brian Bloom (1983–88); Grayson McCouch (2003–10)
- Duration: 1983–88; 2003–10
- First appearance: 1983
- Last appearance: September 17, 2010
In-universe information
- Occupation: Works at Worldwide Industries; Former Owner of Metro; Formerly Half-owner of The Intruder; Former Employee at Worldwide Industries; Former Partner in Metro; Former Investor
- Parents: Gunnar St. Clair; Nicole Berryesa
- Stepfather: Burke Donovan
- Spouse: Jennifer Munson (2006)
- Sons: Lorenzo Donovan
- Adoptive sons: Johnny Montgomery (former)
- Uncles: Lars Stenbeck

Dustin "Dusty" Donovan is a fictional character on CBS's daytime drama As the World Turns. He was recently portrayed by Grayson McCouch from February 18, 2003, to January 18, 2008. McCouch returned to the role on September 24, 2008.

== Character history ==
Born Dustin Donovan, he was the son of Nicole Berryesa Donovan and her lover Gunnar St. Clair but was legally raised by Burke Donovan when Nicole died giving birth to him. He befriended Paul Stenbeck, and a discovery about their family was made. Paul's father and Dusty's father were switched at birth, making Dusty's father and Dusty himself the rich heir of the Stenbecks. In 1983, a rebellious teen, Dusty arrived in Oakdale with his stepfather, horse trainer Burke Donovan. He quickly became involved with Lily Snyder, daughter of rich and wealthy Lucinda Walsh. John Dixon became Dusty's guardian and mentor. Though Lucinda wasn't thrilled with this relationship, she preferred Dusty over the new stableboy, Holden Snyder, who also had a crush on Lily. Lily was stuck between both boys but eventually lost her virginity to Dusty. Around the time Holden was trying to win over Lily, Dusty had sex with Meg Snyder, who afterward pretended to be pregnant by him to cut him loose from Lily. When Dusty found out Meg lied, he broke up with her but didn't get back together with Lily. However, after some time, Dusty felt as if he didn't belong in Oakdale anymore. He decided it was time for him to leave Oakdale to give himself a fresh start in life.

In 2003, Rose D'Angelo met a charming stranger who seemed to know Lily, Rose's twin sister. Though Rose tried to fight her feelings for the handsome and wealthy man, since she was engaged to Paul who had changed his name to "Ryan", she found herself falling for the man. It was then that Oakdale found out the man was, in fact, Dusty Donovan, who made a fortune while he was away. Rose tried to stay committed to Paul, but Dusty kept hitting on her and eventually the two had an affair. It turned out Barbara Ryan, Paul's mother, had paid Dusty to come between Paul and Rose. Paul did break off the engagement, but it was later back on track when Rose broke everything off with Dusty.

Dusty took over the nightclub "Metro" and became business partners with Molly Conlan, with whom he soon started an affair. Though Molly fell in love with Dusty, he made it clear they only had sex and he had no intention dating her. Dusty got himself into trouble when he asked one of his employees, Aaron Snyder, to deliver a package for him. Aaron was caught by the cops and the package turned out to be drugs. Dusty was criticized by Aaron's father, Holden, by Lucy Montgomery, Aaron's girlfriend, and by Molly, who didn't understand what he was thinking.

Shortly after this, Rose died after being poisoned by Will Munson. Lily and Dusty set up the "Rose D'Angelo Foundation". Around that same time, Dusty was threatened by some loan sharks, and Dusty turned out to be not so rich after all. He had to pay back some big money, so he stole from the foundation. This made Lily turn her back on Dusty and she stopped the foundation.

Weeks later, Dusty found two guys in Metro attacking Lucy Montgomery. He saved her life, but Lucy's father Craig wasn't so grateful after Molly said those guys were probably the same ones who wanted the money from Dusty. When Dusty found out Lucy was leaving town, he went to her to ask if she could remember anything about those guys, but Lucy said she had no clear memory. Dusty let her go, but then he caught a glimpse of her limo driver and realized it was the same guy who attacked her. He chased the limo and pulled Lucy out of the car. They hid in a wooden cabin until the attackers found them again. They managed to escape and this time, they found an abandoned place where they hid out for weeks. Although they were first antagonistic towards each other, as Lucy was a spoiled 18-year-old, and Dusty a criminal 30-something, they grew closer, as both saved each other's lives several times. After Lucy could go back to Oakdale safely, they started a relationship against the wishes of Lucy's family. A few months later, Dusty was approached by an old friend, Dominic Ramsey, who planned to set up a boxing match in an Oakdale gym. Dusty found the perfect candidate in Aaron Snyder, but what Dusty, Lucy, and Aaron didn't know was Dom's boxer, Rafael, was ordered to fight with loaded gloves. When Rafi gave Aaron the final punch, Aaron slipped into a coma and was paralyzed. After finding out the secret, Dusty went after Dom, who said to leave him alone or he would come after Lucy. Then Lucy and Rafael were taken by Dominic and they disappeared from the face of the earth. After weeks, Dusty finally found out where they were: an abandoned mineshaft in the mountains. Dusty found them and brought them home safely. Lucy was unsure what to do with her future next, after she had sex with Rafael in the mine. Dusty, in the meantime, realized he wanted to be with Lucy no matter what and bought an engagement ring. When he was about to propose, Lucy told him she was going back to Montega and going to college. Though it broke Dusty's heart, he understood and he let her leave Oakdale.

Months later, he found Meg Snyder back in Oakdale, who had returned after years of absence. Dusty renewed his relationship with her, but in the meantime befriended Jennifer Munson, Paul Ryan's sister. Jennifer, who was his business partner, was pregnant by Mike Kasnoff, but later revealed to Dusty that the unborn child was actually Craig Montgomery's after a one-night stand. Dusty, knowing what Craig was capable of, promised to protect Jennifer when he had to. Mike and Jennifer divorced after Mike discovered Jen had been working with Dusty to take out Craig and didn't tell him about it. Dusty soon found himself falling in love with Jennifer, but being in a relationship with Meg, he decided not to do anything. However, things changed when Dusty found out Meg lied to him about Johnny, Jenn's supposedly deceased baby. Johnny was in fact still alive but was switched at birth by Craig. Dusty was furious with Meg and didn't understand how she could keep a mother away from her baby. He broke up with Meg and moved on with Jennifer.

Jen was still distracted over the death of her brother Paul, but when Dusty discovered Paul still alive, he became outraged and attacked him. However, Dusty was suddenly hit from behind and woke up hours later in an abandoned cabin. He was visited by Emily Stewart, who had taken him hostage. She didn't want Dusty to kill Paul, who was her ex-fiancé. After weeks of trying to convince Emily to let him go, Dusty was found by Jennifer, who had tracked down Emily's whereabouts. Jen and Dusty reunited. Jennifer and Dusty became engaged weeks later, and Dusty adopted Johnny. Sadly, Johnny was admitted to the hospital and was diagnosed with a rare type of blood cancer. Dusty was surprised when he found out the new doctor treating Johnny, was, in fact, Lucy, who had returned a year after her departure. She made it clear right away she didn't want anything from him and wished him luck with Jen and Johnny.

Thanks to Emily, who was pregnant with Paul's child, they could cure Johnny with Emily's unborn baby. Another disaster hit them when Jen felt ill and was rushed to the hospital. Being alone without her son for so long, Jen was determined to leave the hospital against Lucy's orders. Dusty found Jen unconscious on the floor of their apartment and rushed her back to the hospital. There, the doctors told him Jen's heart was infected and she couldn't be saved. Jen wished to be married, and on her deathbed, she married Dusty. As Dusty held her in his arms, she died, leaving him widowed behind. For weeks, Dusty blamed Lucy for Jen's death, because she was Jen's doctor. However, he couldn't help himself but worry about Lucy when she got involved with Damian Grimaldi, a dangerous man. Dusty followed her and he was able to save her in time from everything. After this, he realized she wasn't to blame and he forgave her.

Dusty and Lucy started to hang out more and became friends again, going on dates occasionally. They were often pressured by Lucinda, Lucy's grandmother, who wanted the two back together again, but pushed away by Barbara Ryan, who felt Dusty should grieve some more. When an ice storm hit Oakdale, Johnny got seriously ill and Lucy took him to the hospital. After realizing Lucy almost died in the storm trying to save Johnny's life, Dusty completely trusted her. When Craig returned from jail, Lucy stood by Dusty's side after Craig fought custody over Johnny Montgomery. However, in court, Lucy suddenly decided not to testify against Craig, leaving him a free man. Dusty didn't understand why she did it and was outraged when, days later, he found no Johnny in his house and realized Lucy had taken off with her little brother. Despite all efforts, Lucy could not be tracked down.

Dusty bonded with Emily Stewart, who begged him to help her find her sister Alison, who apparently was addicted to crystal meth and had become a porn star. They tracked Ali down and brought her back to Oakdale. After spending so much time together, Dusty and Emily started something of a relationship. This could not prevent Dusty from having sex with Alison, which, unfortunately, was caught on tape. After Emily saw this tape, she left Oakdale. Dusty still befriended Ali anyway, but he felt lost in Oakdale without Jen, Johnny, or Emily. When Emily returned, she had begun a relationship with Chris Hughes, who returned with her. Despite his efforts to make Emily forgive him, Emily couldn't and demanded he leave her alone. Dusty got involved with old love Lily, who had recently separated her husband Holden. Dusty and Lily had sex, but Dusty couldn't get his mind off Emily. Dusty, therefore, focused his attention on bringing Chris down, and he found an interesting way of doing so when Chris's father Bob collapsed. Dusty found out a young biotechnologist named Evan Walsh IV could have had something to do with this. Since Evan was working for Chris, Dusty collected all the evidence he could. He confronted Emily with it, but she wouldn't believe him. However, things did start to heat up between them and they had sex on New Year's Eve.

When Dusty finally had all the evidence against Evan and Chris, Dusty was already so hated by Oakdale he decided to skip town. However, he was found dead on January 18, 2008. Emily, Chris, Holden, and Lily were among the suspects, each having a motive to kill Dusty. He had been injected with a lethal dose of potassium chloride, a heart-stopping cardiotoxin. All of them were cleared of the charges, and then Lily and Lucinda were suddenly held hostage by Evan, who turned out to be Dusty's killer. Evan didn't get further than the roof of the hospital after he was injected with the same drug used on Dusty.

Barbara organized a funeral for Dusty, but being hated by the whole town, few showed.

== Dusty returns ==
On September 24, 2008, Meg Snyder Ryan was taken hostage by James Stenbeck and taken to a deserted island and locked in a small cabin. When she investigated the cabin, she discovered Dusty locked in a cage in a wine cellar. He explained that he faked his death, using a drug to slow his heartbeat to make it appear as if he had died so he could flee Oakdale and go after Lucy and Johnny. He had never gotten that far because he was taken by someone and put in the cage. Meg's husband Paul found the two of them in a nearby windmill shortly after. James then told Paul that Dusty was after Meg. Dusty said James was the real crook and pointed a gun at him. James grabbed at the gun and the two men struggled. Paul then shot at his father, but the bullet grazed Dusty, causing him to fall on James. This caused James to fall himself, off the windmill balcony and to his death. Paul then took Meg back home. Dusty stayed behind, promising not to go back to Oakdale.

But when Lieutenant Margo Montgomery Hughes found out that an unknown man was shot at the windmill, she started to question Meg. Dusty had sworn her to secrecy about him so she kept quiet. Margo threatened to put Meg in jail if she didn't talk. Being pregnant and unable to go to jail, but also to betray Dusty, she contacted the P.I. that Dusty had told her about who could help Meg contact him if she needed anything. She told him of her situation and the P.I. told this to Dusty. On the night of the opening of the "Luke Snyder Foundation", Dusty showed up at Metro and shocked everybody with his return. Lucinda turned out to be aware of his plan and had helped him get out of town. Dusty was interrogated by Margo and he told her the story. Afterward, he reunited with Emily and the pair had sex. At the reading of James's will shortly after, Paul goes ballistic that Dusty was still the heir to the Stenbeck fortune. Meanwhile, Meg receives a call from Paul's accountant saying Paul borrowed from Worldwide Industries illegally to finance the sanitation of the contaminated soil on her mother Emma Snyder's farm that James caused; that way he could continue his development project. Meg told Dusty and asked him to pay off the loan to keep her and Paul from going bankrupt. Dusty, still being friends with Meg, agrees.

Paul is furious when he finds out, and still furious about Dusty's plan to flee from Oakdale and upset over James's apparent death, he went crazy. He threatened Dusty multiple times and warned him to stay away from Meg. Emily told Dusty that Paul was serious, but Dusty laughed in Paul's face. Paul then went to New York City and hired an actress and her son to roam the world pretending to be Lucy and Johnny so that Dusty would see them and follow them, leaving town and Meg. Dusty fell for it and followed them only to find this was all a set-up arranged by Paul when he catches them in New York.

Dusty confronted Paul in front of Meg and she said if Paul did anything else, they were over. Paul then decides to sell Worldwide Industries so he can focus more on Meg and their baby she was expecting. Not wanting to own a large corporation anymore, Lucinda agrees to find a buyer rather than buy it back. Lucinda discusses this with Dusty and he decides to use the overseas corporation he owned to buy Worldwide, knowing Paul would never sell Worldwide to him. Shortly after, Paul went to Derek Coburn, James's ex-henchman, and paid him $3,000 to plant drugs on Dusty. But unfortunately for Paul, Derek wasn't the same guy he was while working for James and didn't do the job. He went to Meg and told her what Paul did and returned the $3,000. When Meg confronts Paul, he denies it, but Meg gets Paul to slip up.

She then packs up her pull-along suitcase and goes to stay with Emma. After Meg told Dusty about what Paul tried to get Derek to do, he went and met Derek and paid him to be Meg's bodyguard from Paul. Sometime after this, Dusty learned of a mysterious red-headed woman living in New York who had amnesia and was going by the initials of J.M.D. Dusty didn't know what to think but soon became convinced that this woman might be his deceased wife Jennifer. He took off to New York and found the woman, who was a dead ringer for Jennifer, but wasn't Jennifer herself. Her name was Josie Matthews Driver, and she recently had an accident, which had caused her amnesia. However, she did have certain memories that people could confirm weren't hers. When she told them to Dusty, he recognized them as events that happened to Jennifer, and the two became more convinced that Josie was somehow connected to Jennifer. Emily warned Dusty about Josie, and told him she was bad news, but Dusty rejected her concerns.

He and Josie grew closer and eventually had sex. What Dusty didn't know at the time was that Josie knew exactly who she was, and she didn't have any memories of Jen's life. She was hired two weeks earlier by Paul, who was obsessed with getting Dusty out of town (still believing his father about Dusty trying to steal Meg). Josie told Paul she didn't want to go through with the plan anymore because she had started to fall in love with Dusty. Paul offered her more money and added that Dusty never would've like Josie if she didn't remind him so much of Jennifer. Paul then had Josie pretend to have visions of Johnny in Norway.

When she told Dusty of these visions, they prepared to fly there. When Josie didn't show up on Dusty's corporate jet, he canceled the flight. Meanwhile, Emily overheard Paul and Josie discussing how he had hired her to portray his sister. Emily then confronted Paul. Then she went to Dusty and told him Josie was being hired by Paul to portray Jennifer in an argument, leaving out that Paul had hired her to do so. Dusty figured out that it was Paul who hired Josie and went to confront him. Emily called Paul to tell him that Dusty knew and that he was coming over to confront him. Paul then got Meg out of the house by sending her ornament shopping. He then grabbed his gun. When Dusty arrived and told Paul what he did, Paul denied doing anything. Dusty pushed and Paul admitted to hiring Josie to portray Jennifer to get Dusty out of town.

Paul then told Dusty to stay away from Meg. But Dusty said he was going to tell Meg what Paul did and she'd never trust Paul again afterward. Paul pointed his gun at Dusty and said he was going to kill him. Dusty warned Paul if he did this then Meg would never want him again, but Paul said it was worth the risk. Dusty then grabbed at the gun and they struggled. Dusty managed to get the gun away from Paul. Paul then grabbed an ax and held it up at Dusty. Dusty pointed the gun at Paul and told him to drop it. Paul started to do so and suddenly ran towards Dusty with the ax.

Dusty was then forced to shoot Paul in self-defense, just as Meg entered the room. She ran to Paul, who said Dusty tried to kill him. Dusty then goes to Java and calls Josie, who is leaving town, to meet him there, saying he owes it to him after what she's done. She then meets him and he asked her why she agreed to portray Jennifer. She told him she had expensive college loans and Paul agreed to pay them off, saying it was easy money. Dusty also asked her what her real name was. She told him it was Josie Anderson, Josie being short for Josephine. He told her how he shot Paul and how the police were after him. Josie said she can prove that Paul hired her to portray Jennifer to the police and if she did, they'd believe that Paul being shot was in self-defense. Dusty wouldn't hear of it. When the police arrived at Java to arrest Dusty, he left unspotted and hid at Metro.

Meg finds him there and accuses him of trying to kill Paul. Dusty told her how Paul hired Josie to portray Jennifer and how when he confronted Paul, he tried to kill him, and how he shot Paul in self-defense because Paul came at him with an ax. Meg doesn't believe him and calls the police and tell them where Dusty was hiding. Margo then arrests Dusty. While in jail, Craig Montgomery (having recently returned to town) arrives, telling Dusty he's on his side.

Dusty doesn't believe it and to prove it, he finds Josie and brings her to the police station. Dusty thinks it's a trick and asks how she got involved with Craig. Josie said she didn't know him and she again offers to tell the police about Paul hiring her but again, Dusty won't hear of it. Josie asks him why he's protecting her. He tells her it's because, like Jennifer, she too was a victim of Paul Ryan and he didn't want her to suffer anymore because of him. Josie tells Dusty that she loved him like Jennifer. Dusty tells Josie to tell Meg the truth about Paul. When she arrives at their house, Paul tells Josie that Meg isn't home and so she sits down and waits.

Paul grabs his gun. Just then, Meg comes home and Paul quickly hides the gun. Paul tells Meg that Josie is here to lie on Dusty's behalf. Josie then tells Meg how Paul hired her to portray Jennifer to get Dusty out of town and how when Dusty found out, he went to confront Paul, who tried to kill him, but Dusty shot him in self-defense. Paul tells Meg she's lying on Dusty's behalf so Dusty can get out of jail, but Josie told Meg she was going to tell this to the police, but Dusty wouldn't allow it. She told Meg how Dusty didn't care about getting out of jail, only about Meg knowing the truth about Paul. After Josie left, Meg questions Paul about this. Paul desperately continues to deny what Josie claimed, but because he'd previously tried to get Dusty out of town, Meg doesn't believe Paul. She tells him to look her in the eyes and tell her what he did to Dusty.

Paul finally confesses that he did what Josie claimed to keep him from stealing Meg. Meg reminded him that she kept telling him that she was finished with Dusty and that Paul only did it because he cared more about fighting "the same old battles" than he did losing her. She then makes him tell the police the truth. He does and Dusty is freed. He and Josie go to Java to celebrate. When Paul got home, Meg had her suitcase packed saying she's leaving him. Paul pleads for her to reconsider saying their baby needed both parents. But Meg tells Paul their baby needs a mother who isn't afraid to leave her father because he can't be trusted. She then returns to Emma's. A few days later, Meg goes and apologizes to Dusty for what Paul did to him and she should have known he was just lying to her like he always does. She then tells Dusty she's getting a divorce from Paul. Dusty then takes her to Java where they catch Paul harassing Josie. They get him to back off. Later, Josie told Dusty that Paul was harassing her to tell Meg he had a change of heart about hiring Josie and when he told her to stop, she refused because she liked portraying someone she's not, getting the idea from Barbara. Paul even offered Josie money to change her story, but she refused. Paul then overdoses on anxiety pills to get Meg to help him and realize she wanted him, getting the idea from his father's ghost. He leaves her a suicide note and she finds him lying unconscious on the floor at his cabin. Meg desperately tries to revive him but gets no response, and tries to drag Paul to safety. This causes her to go into labor. She calls Dusty, who is with Josie at Al's Diner, and tells him of this. He then goes to the cabin and finds Meg going into labor and an unconscious Paul. He calls an ambulance for Paul and tells Meg he'll have to get her to the hospital now. Meg wants to stay to tell the E.M.T.s what Paul overdosed on. Dusty finds the pill bottle and sets it beside Paul, saying now they'll know what Paul overdosed on. He then picks up Meg and takes her to the hospital, where she gives birth to a premature but healthy baby girl, Eliza.

When Craig returns to town, Dusty and Paul team up to get back at their enemy. However, where there's a father, a daughter is never far behind, and soon, Dusty comes face to face with Lucy, who has reached a point where she will kill everyone who gets in her way of getting what she wants.

After Josie told Dusty that Lucy and Johnny were back, Alison had to give in and let Dusty see Johnny. Since then, they have tried to shield Johnny from Craig. Craig finds out about this. Dusty and Lucy plan to leave town with Johnny. Craig finds out and calls Margo to have her arrest Lucy for kidnapping Johnny. Dusty tells Lucy she needs to leave town cause even if she isn't charged, Craig will find a way to make her suffer for what she did. Lucy agrees, but says Dusty must try to make peace with Craig for Johnny's sake and she must say goodbye to Johnny. Josie leads them on a wild goose chase, giving Lucy time to say goodbye to Johnny before leaving town on Dusty's corporate jet.

When Craig and Margo get back after realizing they were tricked, Craig demands Margo arrest Dusty and Josie for aiding a kidnapper. Margo said if she did, everyone (including Johnny) will always hate him. Dusty offers to make peace with Craig if he spares him. Craig reluctantly agreed. They struggled to do so, resulting in Dusty calling for a custody hearing to take Craig's custody rights for Johnny from him. Craig attempted to marry Carly Tenney to make a judge think he was a family man.

Unfortunately for Craig, Carly dumped him at the altar, leaving him single. Dusty proposed to Meg to make him also look like a family man. He said it will prove to her estranged husband Paul that their life together was over and he'll stop stalking her to get her to take him back. Meg refused, not being in love with him, but Dusty convinces her to consider. He tells Josie that he has to do it for Johnny because he comes first. Paul went to Emma's to see Meg to convince her to take him back. Meg almost considers, but brings up Dusty's proposal, having been told by an angry Josie. They argue and Meg tells him to leave. Paul tells her she still loves him and she reminds him she never denied it, only the fact she can't take him back and his behavior just confirms it. Paul threatened Meg, telling her she can't ever live without him. A disgusted Meg told Dusty she'll marry him. On January 26, 2009, they were married in Reno, Nevada in a small, simple ceremony, following the finalization of her divorce from Paul that day. It was only when they returned that they learned from Lily and Holden that Craig and Carly didn't marry.

== See also ==
- Dusty Donovan and Lucy Montgomery
