= John Colenback =

American actor (1935–2015)

- Born: October 8, 1935; Toledo, Ohio, U.S.
- Died: May 12, 2015 (aged 79); Los Angeles, California, U.S.
- Occupation: Actor
- Years active: 1958–2015

John Colenback (October 8, 1935 – May 12, 2015) was an American television and stage actor. He was best known for portraying Dan Stewart on As the World Turns.

== Early years ==
Colenback was born October 5, 1935, in Toledo, Ohio, the son of Mr. and Mrs. Lloyd Colenback. His father, an executive vice president with Toledo Scale Company, died when he was 12. John Colenback attended Ottaway Hills Elementary School and was in 17 theatrical productions as a student at Ottawa Hills High School and was named best actor at Dartmouth College during his senior year there.

== Stage ==
Summer stock theatre led the way for Colenback's acting career. An agent spotted him at Bucks County Playhouse in Pennsylvania and persuaded him to try acting in New York. On Broadway, Colenback appeared in After the Rain (1967) and A Man for All Seasons (1961-1963). His obituary in Variety noted, "He starred in regional productions of The Importance of Being Earnest, The Halloween Bandit, Rosencrantz and Guildenstern Are Dead, As You Like It, and The Chinese Well and toured nationally in The Irregular Verb to Love.

== Death ==
Colenback died in West Hollywood, California, of complications of chronic obstructive pulmonary disease on May 12, 2015, at age 79.
