= Scott Bryce =

American actor (1958–2026)

- Born: Scott Macalister Bryce; January 6, 1958; New York City, U.S.
- Died: July 12, 2026 (aged 68); New Haven, Connecticut, U.S.
- Other name: Scott M. Bryce
- Occupation: Actor
- Years active: 1977–2025
- Spouse: Jodi Stevens (m. 2003)
- Children: 1

Scott Macalister Bryce (January 6, 1958 – July 12, 2026), sometimes credited as Scott M. Bryce, was an American film and television actor. Bryce was perhaps best known for his portrayal of Craig Montgomery on As the World Turns (1982–1991, 1993–1994, 2007–2008).

== Life and career ==
Bryce was born in New York City on January 6, 1958, the son of daytime actor Ed Bryce, who for many years played Bill Bauer on The Guiding Light.

He grew up in Westport, Connecticut, and attended Staples High School where he was an active member of The Staples Players student theater group. He appeared at the Palace Theatre on Broadway as a Roman soldier in George Bernard Shaw's Caesar and Cleopatra in 1977.

Bryce was twice nominated for Daytime Emmys. He opened a three-camera television studio in an old vaudeville theater in Connecticut. He made numerous appearances in primetime, including Murphy Brown (on which he played the recurring role of Corky Sherwood's husband Will Forrest), The Facts of Life, ER, Law & Order, Reba and Sex and the City. In addition, the actor appeared as a doctor in six episodes of ABC's One Life to Live in 2006.

He was perhaps best known for the role of Craig Montgomery. He joined As the World Turns in 1982 and was initially paired with Meg Ryan. He continued in the role until 1987, and then made several short-term returns over the years until he departed in 1994. The show re-hired Bryce in 2007, but it was announced in January 2008 that he had been released from the role.

In 2014, Bryce played Senator Tom Wesley in the soap opera web series Beacon Hill.

Bryce also worked behind the camera, producing the television film Frederick Douglass: From Slavery to Freedom and producing and directing the soap opera satire Steamboat, both in 2010. In addition, he taught acting at ACT (A Contemporary Theater) of Connecticut and, along with his wife, Jodi Stevens, he ran SBE Studio (Stevens Bryce Entertainment), which provides acting and singing instruction.

Bryce was a longtime resident of Weston, Connecticut. In 2025, he was diagnosed with terminal esophageal and stomach cancer. He died in New Haven, Connecticut, on July 12, 2026, at the age of 68.

== Filmography ==
=== Film ===
Year	Title	Role	Notes	Ref.
1992	Lethal Weapon 3	Young Man	Credited as Scott M. Bryce	
1993	Visions of Murder	Lt. Sayles	TV film	
1996	Up Close & Personal	Rob Sullivan		
1998	Above Freezing			
2012	Not Waving but Drowning	Damon		

=== Television ===
Year	Title	Role	Notes	Ref.
1982–1991; 1993–1994; 2007–2008	As the World Turns	Craig Montgomery		
1988	The Facts of Life	Rick Bonner		
1990–1992	Murphy Brown	Will Forrest		
1990	The Golden Girls	Dr. Warren		
1992	2000 Malibu Road	Scott Sterling		
1992	The Commish	Sam Cole		
1993	Matlock	Elliot Eagleton		
1996	Homicide: Life on the Street	Philip Engle		
1997	Law & Order	Steven Tashjian		
1997	Diagnosis: Murder	Tod Grimes		
1998	Sex and the City	Tim		
1999–2001	Popular	Mike McQueen		
2006–2007	One Life to Live	Ed Crosby		
2009, 2018	Law & Order: Special Victims Unit	Bill Garnet, Bill Schwartz		
2010	30 Rock	Dave		
2011	Homeland	Maj. Foster		
2014	Blue Bloods	Dr. Garland		
2021	The Blacklist	Derek Huntley		

== Accolades ==
Year	Association	Category	Project	Result	Ref.
1986	Soap Opera Digest Award	Outstanding Young Leading Actor in a Daytime Serial	As the World Turns	Nominated	
1986	Daytime Emmy	Outstanding Lead Actor in a Drama Series	As the World Turns	Nominated	
1987	Daytime Emmy	Outstanding Lead Actor in a Drama Series	As the World Turns	Nominated	
1988	Soap Opera Digest Award	Outstanding Hero: Daytime	As the World Turns	Nominated	
