= Dan Stewart (As the World Turns) =

- As the World Turns character
- Portrayed by: Paul O'Keefe (1962–63); Doug Chapin (1964); Jeffrey Rowland (1965); John Colenback (1966–73, 1976–79); John Reilly (1974–76)
- Duration: 1958–1979
- First appearance: 1958
- Last appearance: September 21, 1979
- Created by: Irna Phillips
- Introduced by: Ted Corday
In-universe information
- Other names: Jimmy Lowell III
- Occupation: Doctor
- Parents: Tim Cole; Ellen Lowell
- Adoptive parents: David Stewart; Betty Stewart
- Siblings: Paul Stewart (adoptive); Annie Stewart (adoptive); Dee Stewart (adoptive)
- Spouse: Susan Stewart (1966–72); Liz Talbot (1973); Kim Dixon (1977–79)
- Daughters: Betsy Stewart; Emily Stewart
- Grandchildren: Danielle Andropolous; Alison Stewart; Lyon Hunter; Daniel Hughes
- Grandparents: Jim Lowell; Claire English

Daniel "Dan" Stewart (born James "Jimmy" Lowell) is a fictional character from the daytime soap opera As the World Turns.

== Storylines ==
Viewers saw Dan's beginnings as Jimmy Lowell, and watched as Ellen, a young single mother, gave up Jimmy for adoption. After Dan's adoptive mother died, his birth mother married his adoptive father, David Stewart, and mother and son were reunited.

Dan was married to heroines Liz Talbot and Kim Reynolds, as well as the more villainous Susan Burke. A love quadrangle with Dan, Susan, Liz and Dan's brother Paul was a cornerstone of the show's storylines for many years.

The character of Dan died of a brain tumor. Dan's daughters, Emily Stewart and Betsy Stewart, figured prominently into subsequent stories on As the World Turns.
