= Gwen Norbeck Munson =

- As the World Turns character
- Portrayed by: Jennifer Landon
- Duration: 2005–2008, 2010
- First appearance: March 30, 2005
- Last appearance: September 15, 2010
- Created by: Hogan Sheffer and Jean Passanante
- Introduced by: Christopher Goutman
In-universe information
- Occupation: Student; Singer
- Parents: Ray Tenney; Iris Dumbrowski
- Half-brothers: Cole Norbeck
- Half-sisters: Carly Tenney
- Spouse: Will Munson (2006–)
- Sons: Billy Norbeck
- Adoptive daughters: Hallie Munson
- Nieces and nephews: Parker Snyder; J.J. Snyder (adoptive); Sage Snyder; Hallie Munson
- First cousins: Molly Peterson

Gwen Norbeck Munson is a fictional character from the American CBS soap opera As the World Turns. She was introduced on March 30, 2005, and was portrayed by Jennifer Landon until April 4, 2008, and again in 2010. Landon won three Daytime Emmy Awards for Outstanding Younger Actress in 2006, 2007 and 2008. Originally shown to be a poor, emancipated minor, Gwen has risen to become a strong woman with a tough exterior, but when under pressure, the uncertainty of her life prevails.

== Casting ==
Jennifer Landon first appeared as Gwen in the episode airing on March 30, 2005. Munson then made her exit as Gwen in the episode that originally aired on April 4, 2010. Landon appeared in almost 500 episodes of the soap as Gwen.

== Storylines ==
Gwen first appeared as a waitress at Al's, a popular restaurant in town. She was set up on a date with Will Munson, which ended disastrously with Will kicking Gwen out of the car. Will was nursing a crush on Allison Stewart, while Gwen showed more interest in Casey Hughes, Will's best friend. To get closer to Casey, Gwen befriended his girlfriend Celia Ortega. Casey and Gwen shared a secret and Casey preferred it if Gwen stayed away from his circle of friends, but nevertheless she became part of their group. It became clear that Gwen and Casey had previously slept together. While Casey wanted to leave the past behind them, Gwen had stunning news: she was pregnant.

Afraid to tell Casey the truth (for fear of upsetting Celia, with whom Gwen had become good friends), Gwen revealed the truth to Will. Will took charge of the situation and pretended to be the baby's father. He made sure Gwen, an emancipated minor living in a tiny apartment in town, made all of her doctor's appointments and kept her good condition for the baby. When Will's mother, Barbara Ryan, found out that Will was claiming to be the father of Gwen's baby, she insisted on a paternity test (that was never taken), thus beginning the feud Barbara and Gwen would have for months to come.

Gwen decided to give the baby up for adoption, to Rosanna Montgomery. She gave birth prematurely, thanks in part to the lack of care she received in her early pregnancy, and began to connect with the baby. When Rosanna fell into a coma after being run off the road in her car, Gwen thought that she and Will (who she fell in love with) would be free to take custody of the baby but a roadblock was thrown in the form of Carly Snyder, Rosanna's half-sister. Before slipping into her coma, Rosanna told Carly to take care of the baby boy.

Gwen sought custody of the baby, but at the hearing, the judge wanted her to name the father of the child. Tearfully, she confessed that Casey was the father of her child, not Will. A paternity test was done and, shockingly, Casey was not a match to the child! The whole town turned against Gwen, as Casey's family had been the cornerstone of Oakdale for many years. Even Will turned against her.

While Carly had custody of the child, Gwen had visitation rights. Carly wanted to force Gwen out once and for all, resorting to dirty tricks to get her out of the picture. Gwen's life became even more complicated when her mother, Iris Dumbrowski, arrived in Oakdale. The judge granted Gwen temporary custody as long as she lived with Iris. Iris didn't like Will and schemed to have him arrested for poisoning her. Gwen and Will took the baby on the run with them to New York City. After Carly, Iris, and Carly's husband Jack followed them, Gwen learned that Carly was her half-sister; they shared the same father!

Iris went to jail for setting up Will and the baby went back to Carly and Jack. A surprising truth came out that shocked everyone: the baby was not Gwen's child. It was actually the son of Jennifer Munson, Will's sister. The babies were switched at birth by Craig Montgomery. Since Gwen's baby turned out to be Jennifer's, it was clear that Gwen's baby was the one believed to be Jennifer's: the one who had died shortly after birth.

Gwen and Casey mended their relationship and became friends. Gwen and Will fell deeper in love. Barbara was dead set against their love and schemed to break them up. She cut off Will's trust fund, leaving the two teenagers penniless, and she enlisted Hal to help get them evicted from their apartment. After weeks of living life homeless, Gwen and Will ran away to Springfield to get married. They returned to town and moved in with Will's father, Hal Munson, under the condition that they both go back to school and graduate. Casey helped Gwen get a job at his grandmother's new teen music club, Crash, as Gwen had previously been a part of a band.

Gwen found out Jade Taylor helped Will cheat on a test. Gwen helped counsel Carly with her divorce from Jack. The Oakdale Slasher killed some of Gwen's classmates and attempted to kill Gwen. The Slasher was revealed to be Eve, Maddie's sister. Jade Taylor pretended to pregnant with Will's child and left Gwen contemplating a divorce of her own. When Gwen and Will found out that Jade was faking her pregnancy, they reunited. Will's brother Adam came to town on the heels of their father's death (Hal Munson). Adam agreed to produce a demo of Gwen's music.

When Gwen found out that Adam was seeing Jade, she stopped the production immediately. She didn't want to work with anyone who was involved with Jade Taylor. Still, Gwen was desperate to make music, so, eventually, she agreed to go along with Adam. Gwen was thrilled that she could finally do what she loves the most. Seeing her so happy and enthusiastic, Adam started to fall for her. When they went to New York for a couple of days to promote Gwen's song, Adam decided to make his move and kissed Gwen. However, even though she liked Adam, Gwen made it clear that they were just friends and that she was married. Adam accepted her rejection and apologized to her. But Adam had changed. He kept trying to seduce Gwen, no matter what she said. Then, Gwen and Will's money was stolen, and while some knew Casey was the one behind it, Adam made it look like Will was the one who stole it. He even placed fake evidence and Gwen started to believe that Will was really guilty. But when she heard about Casey's gambling problem, she knew Will wasn't the one who stole the money, Casey was. Will and Casey gave their brother a chance and let him leave Oakdale. Adam asked Gwen to meet him in the forest, so they could say goodbye. Even though Gwen didn't feel comfortable with it, she decided to go anyway. There, Adam confessed his love for her and despite the fact Gwen tried to reject him, Adam forced her to kiss him. Suddenly, Adam was hit from behind by Maddie, who thought Adam tried to rape Gwen. Unfortunately, Adam was hit so hard that his head was covered with blood and he wasn't breathing. Afraid that they might have killed him and that they would go to jail, Maddie and Gwen buried Adam in the forest. Soon after, Gwen discovered her wedding ring was buried along with Adam. Scared to death that someone might find the body along with her ring, Gwen went to his grave several times to find her ring, without any success. Then, someone started to stalk Gwen, sending dead flowers and walking around her house. Eventually Adam revealed he was still alive, and he attacked Gwen. He was caught in mid-attack by Will and Casey, who overpowered him and forced him to agree to leave Oakdale forever.

Angry at Gwen and Maddie for getting away with attempted murder while continuing to look down their noses at her, Jade vowed revenge. Posting an ad on the internet for a Gwen lookalike, she caught the attention of Cleo Babbit. Exactly what Jade intended for Cleo to do is unclear because Cleo soon decided to go it alone, and wormed her way into Will and Gwen's lives. Cleo wanted Will to fall in love with her and leave Gwen, and deluded herself for a while into thinking that it was happening. Finally growing impatient, Cleo admitted her feelings to Will, who rejected her. In retaliation, she knocked him out and then kidnapped Gwen, tying her to a railroad track alongside Jade, who had tried to warn the couple and stop the dangerous Cleo. Gwen and Jade escaped, and Cleo was arrested and never heard from again.

The Cleo experience changed Jade and caused her to make nice with Gwen before leaving town. With the departure of her longtime nemesis, Gwen enjoyed some happy stress-free time with her husband. Gwen surprised Will with the news that she was pregnant in August 2007. Also in that month, Gwen was shocked to learn that her older brother Cole was back in Oakdale, after deserting her ten years prior to cope with a drunken Iris all alone. Later, Gwen would miscarry, but her life was saved by Alison Stewart and her mother Susan Stewart.

Then Barbara tells her son and Gwen that a couple wants to give up their yet unborn child for adoption. Gwen and Will have doubts since the couple wants to remain unknown, but eventually go on with the plan. What they don't know is that this couple is in fact Sofie Duran and her boyfriend Cole Norbeck. The plan was made by Barbara and Iris, who paid Cole big money for this. Sofie was told that her baby would go to a couple who also wanted to remain anonymous. Both sides continued with it all, until Alison found out about the plan. She told Gwen and Will, who confronted both their mothers with their plans. Barbara admitted that there was no other way for them to get a baby otherwise, because no agency would let them adopt a baby due to Will's past. Will broke the bond with his mother and informed Sofie. A week later, Sofie went into labor and Gwen and Will help her deliver the baby. When Sofie is alone in her bedroom she cries for Cole, who left town, and for knowing she can't raise this baby. Back at home, Gwen breaks down in Will's arms because she still wants this baby. Sofie makes a decision. She tells Gwen and Will that she will give them her baby, if she gets to be a part of her life.

After Sofie signed all rights of the baby to Will and Gwen, she felt a connection between her and her baby. She thought it would go away, but it didn't. As Sofie got more and more involved in Hallie's (Gwen and Will's choice of name for the baby) life Gwen and Will decided it would be best if Sofie stayed away for a while. Sofie did not like this and broke down and felt depressed. While Will and Gwen let Barbara babysit for Hallie, Sofie came and asked if she could see Hallie. Barbara did not like Sofie so she said no (in a mean way). Later when Barbara was napping (at the same time Hallie is napping) Sofie came back, and saw that Barbara left the door unlocked. Sofie took Hallie. When Gwen and Will come back, they notice that the door is open and when they find Hallie missing, they go to the police. They both know that it was Sofie who took the baby. Aaron (a friend of both Sofie's and Will and Gwen's) goes to find Sofie, and finds her in New York. Eventually Sofie brings back Hallie because she has a fever. Gwen feels bad for Sofie and knows what it feels like to lose a baby, so she convinces Will to drop the charges.

Sofie decides that she wants to go to court for custody of Hallie, and feels abandoned when Aaron testifies for Will and Gwen (because he is Hallie's godfather). The judge grants Will and Gwen full custody of Hallie, and Sofie feels even more depressed. As time goes on Gwen is feeling more and more like they took Hallie from her mom, and even though she loves Hallie so much, she can't live with herself if this keeps on going on. Will tries to snap her out of it, because he doesn't want to give Hallie up, but behind his back Gwen gives Hallie to Sofie (not legally). Will comes back to find out that Gwen has already given Hallie to Sofie and is mad, but still loves Gwen. Will hopes that Gwen will change her mind and take Hallie back before Sofie becomes Hallie's mother legally.

When Hallie gets sick, Gwen is there to help Sofie. While they help Hallie in time, Sofie realizes that though she is Hallie's biological mother she is not what's good for Hallie. Gwen and Will are. Sofie gives Hallie back to Gwen and Will for the last time. After this, Gwen and Will decide to leave town with Hallie, to start a new life with just the three of them.

The character of Hallie has been said to "embody the Jungian archetype" of the Child, because of the pronounced mode of interaction between Hallie and the other characters in the series.

== Reception ==
For her role as Gwen, Landon won three consecutive Daytime Emmy Awards for Outstanding Younger Actress in 2006, 2007 and 2008.
