= Frannie Hughes =

- As the World Turns character
- Portrayed by: Kelly Campbell (1973–74); Maura Gilligan (1975–79); Tracy O'Neil (1980–81); Melaney Candel (1982); Helene Udy (1982–83); Terri VandenBosch (1983–84); Julianne Moore (1985–88, 2010); Mary Ellen Stuart (1989–92); Mary Fox Kane (1991)
- Duration: 1973–1992; 2010
- First appearance: 1973
- Last appearance: April 5, 2010
- Created by: Robert Soderberg and Edith Sommer
- Introduced by: Joe Willmore (1973); Robert Calhoun (1985); Christopher Goutman (2010)
In-universe information
- Occupation: Psychologist
- Parents: Bob Hughes; Jennifer Sullivan
- Stepmother: Kim Sullivan Hughes
- Siblings: Tom Hughes; Barbara Ryan; Rick Ryan; Melinda Grey; Sabrina Hughes; Christopher Hughes II; Andrew Dixon (step)
- Husband: Darryl Crawford (1993–94)
- Grandparents: Christopher Hughes I Nancy Hughes
- Aunts and uncles: Susan Hughes; Penny Hughes Cunningham; Don Hughes; Kim Sullivan Hughes
- Nieces and nephews: Lien Hughes; Casey Hughes; Daniel Hughes; Paul Ryan; Jennifer Munson; Will Munson; John "Johnny" Dixon Jr.
- First cousins: Sabrina Hughes; Andrew Dixon; Christopher Hughes II; Ryder Hughes; Christina Hughes; Amy Lin Cunningham (adoptive)
- Other relatives: William "Billy" Norbeck; John "Johnny" Donovan; Jennifer Ryan; Hallie Jennifer Munson; Eliza Ryan

Frances Jennifer "Frannie" Hughes (formerly Crawford) is a fictional character on the daytime soap opera As the World Turns played by several actresses from 1973 to 1992. Frannie was most notably portrayed by future Academy Award winner Julianne Moore, from April 2, 1985, to May 1988 and April 5, 2010.

== Storylines ==
Frances "Frannie" Hughes was born to Bob and Jennifer Hughes. Though the character was born onscreen in 1973, in a later storyline her birth year was said to be 1965, for a story where the character was age 20 in 1985.

Frannie's parents, and Jennifer's sister Kim, were involved in a complicated situation; Kim and Bob had feelings for each other, and in the storyline, Bob had a pregnant wife (Jennifer) as well as a pregnant mistress (Kim). Kim miscarried her baby, while Jennifer gave birth to Frannie. Jennifer died when Frannie was a toddler and she was raised by her father and grandparents. Even though she grew up motherless, Frannie was surrounded by family, and she grew to see Kim as a mother figure in later years.

Since Frannie was so well adjusted, her family was shocked when she flunked out of Yale after one year. When Frannie returned to Oakdale, her old boyfriend, Kevin Gibson, followed her, hoping to repair their relationship. The relationship was rocky with Kevin because of paternity issues with his ex-girlfriend, Marie, and they broke up.

Next, Frannie dated club owner Doug Cummings; they became engaged by Christmas 1985. He turned out to be a psychotic who also worshiped her Aunt Kim (and Frannie's new step-mother with her marriage to Bob) and he longed to make a family with Kim and Frannie. He had even built a hidden shrine to Kim. As Doug was about to rape an unconscious Frannie, he was murdered; her former boyfriend Kevin helped come to the rescue and died in the fight. Eventually, it was revealed both Doug and Kevin were killed by Doug's love-starved assistant Marsha Talbot and Frannie was cleared, but not before Marsha kidnapped Frannie. Frannie was rescued by man who would be her next boyfriend, Casey Peretti. Despite Casey being hailed as a hero, Frannie realized she wasn't in love with Casey and thought it unkind to him to string him along.

Soon after, Frannie studied psychology at Oxford. While in England, Frannie saw a woman who closely resembled her. After some sleuthing, she learned the woman, Sabrina, was her own half-sister and cousin! Sabrina was the child Kim believed she'd miscarried years ago, and was very close in age to Frannie (since Kim and Jennifer had been pregnant at roughly the same time). A sibling rivalry developed between Frannie and Sabrina; Frannie had become engaged to Seth Snyder, but when Sabrina tricked Seth into sleeping with her (because of their similar looks), Frannie was unable to reconcile the relationship and they broke up. Eventually, Frannie forgave Sabrina and they became fairly close.

Back in Oakdale and now a psychologist, Frannie dated Dr. Larry McDermott before eventually marrying businessman Darryl Crawford. When Darryl became the prime suspect in the murder of Carolyn Crawford, his first wife, the evidence mounted against him and Frannie became terribly frightened of her new husband. When Darryl was proven innocent, Frannie couldn't forgive herself for doubting him and gave him a divorce. Frannie then left Oakdale to help refugees in Montega.

Several years later, Frannie and her sister decided to go to Haiti to aid in the relief efforts following that country's devastating earthquake. Before going, Frannie stopped by Oakdale to celebrate her parents' wedding anniversary.
