= Christopher Hughes II =

- As the World Turns character
- Daniel Cosgrove as Chris Hughes
- Portrayed by: Adam Hirshan (1986–1990); Eren Ross Cannata (1990–1991); Christian Siefert (1992–1998); Ben Jorgenson (1999); Paul Korver (1999–2001); Alan White (2002); Bailey Chase (2003–2005); Dylan Bruce (2007–2008); Daniel Cosgrove (2010)
- Duration: 1986–2005; 2007–2008; 2010
- First appearance: August 30, 1986
- Last appearance: September 17, 2010
- Created by: Douglas Marland
- Introduced by: Robert Calhoun (1986); Christopher Goutman (2007, 2010)
- Dylan Bruce as Chris Hughes

- Bailey Chase as Chris Hughes
In-universe information
- Occupation: Doctor; Interim Chief of Staff; Head of Research Department
- Parents: Bob Hughes; Kim Sullivan
- Siblings: Tom Hughes; Frannie Hughes; Sabrina Hughes; Andy Dixon
- Children: Unnamed child (miscarriage with Alison)
- Grandparents: Chris Hughes I Nancy Hughes; Frances Sullivan
- Aunts and uncles: Susan Hughes; Penny Hughes; Don Hughes; Jennifer Sullivan Hughes; Pearl Hughes; Edith Hughes Frey; John Hughes
- First cousins: Ryder Hughes; Christina Hughes; Amy Lin Cunningham (adoptive); Rick Ryan; Barbara Ryan; Melinda Grey; Paul Ryan; Jennifer Munson Donovan; Will Munson; Johnny Dixon; John Munson Donovan; Jennifer Ryan; Hallie Munson
- Other relatives: Lien Hughes; Adam Munson; Casey Hughes; Daniel Hughes; Billy Norbeck

Christopher Hughes II is a fictional character from the CBS soap opera As the World Turns. The role was most notably portrayed by Bailey Chase from 2003 to 2005, Dylan Bruce from 2007 to 2008 and two-time Emmy nominee Daniel Cosgrove in 2010.

== Casting and characterization ==
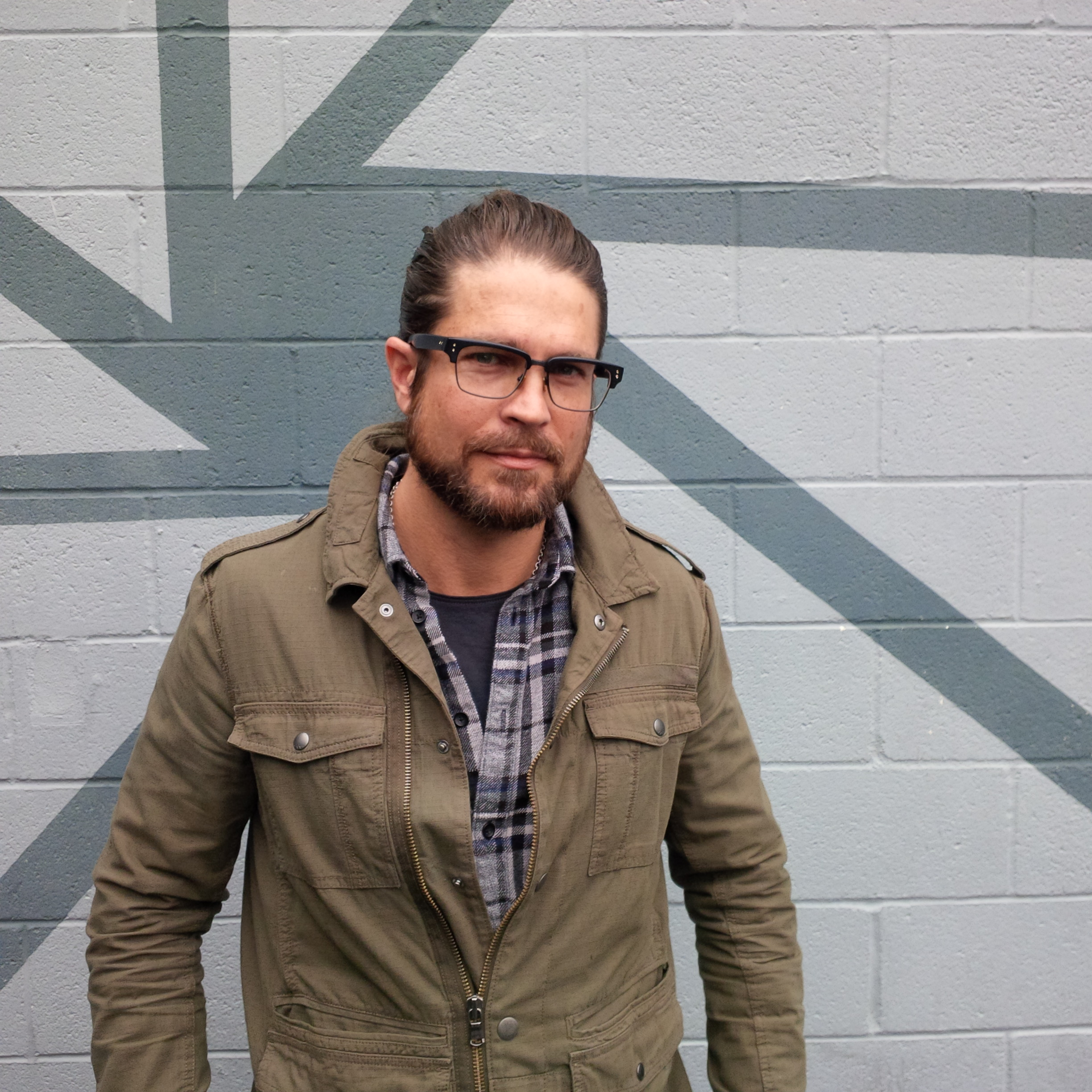
Paul Korver portrayed Christopher Hughes from 1999 to March 2001

Chris Hughes was played by nine actors throughout the character's run including Adam Hirshan from 1986 to 1990, Eren Ross Cannata from 1990 to 1991, Christian Siefert from 1992 to January 28, 1998, Ben Jorgenson in 1999, Paul Korver from 1999 to March 8, 2001 and Alan White from July 3, 2002, to September 17, 2002. The role was soon cast with actor Bailey Chase from January 29, 2003, to January 20, 2005. Chase eventually went on to star in various primetime series such as the MyNetworkTV telenovela series Watch Over Me and the FX drama Damages, among many other projects. Following Chase's departure, Dylan Bruce took over the role from October 25, 2007, to October 15, 2008. Bruce had previously auditioned for a number of soap operas and played the role of a rat turned into a man by on NBC's Passions in 2005. Bruce's agent Michael Bruno got him an audition for the role of "Nate" and his tape was sent to the show's casting director Mary Clay Boland before he was hired for the role of Chris.

Bruce sat down with Soap Opera Digest columnist Jennifer Lenhart to discuss his role and his enjoyment to be working with the show's veterans.

"But I like that he's a Hughes because I get to work with such great vets. And when they're on-screen, hopefully the longtime fans love that having me back means seeing Don Hastings [Bob] and Kathryn Hays [Kim] more."

—Dylan Bruce, Soap Opera Digest

After Bruce was let go from the show nearly a year later, the show cast Daniel Cosgrove in the role and he began airing in March 2010 until the final episode on September 17, 2010. Cosgrove joined ATWT following the finale of the long-running CBS soap opera Guiding Light after having played the role of Bill Lewis III from 2002 to 2005 and 2007 to 2009. Cosgrove also played the role of Scott Chandler on the ABC soap opera All My Children from 1995 to 1997 before returning to the show from 2010 to 2011 after taking over for the departing Adam Mayfield. Before returning to AMC, Cosgrove was said to be in talks with One Life to Live to play the role of Joey Buchanan. Cosgrove led a long career outside of daytime, having appeared in shows such as Beverly Hills 90210 and Dirty Sexy Money.

== Character history ==
=== Family and relationships ===
Dr. Chris Hughes is a member of the long-standing Hughes family of Oakdale, Illinois. He is the son of Bob Hughes and Kim Hughes, the brother of Tom Hughes, Frannie Hughes, Sabrina Hughes and Andy Dixon. He is also the grandson of Chris Hughes and the town's matriarch Nancy Hughes. Growing up in the town's most respected family, Chris at times felt unwanted pressure to become a certain type of man and follow in the footsteps of his father in the medical profession. He eventually became a doctor at Oakdale Memorial Hospital and also traveled the world with the Global Health Association, medically assisting those less than fortunate. Chris' relationships include Katie Peretti, Molly Conlan, Abigail Williams, Emily Stewart, Sofie Duran, and Alison Stewart before finally settling down with his first love Katie at the conclusion of the series in 2010. At the end of the series, Chris battled a rare disease he was diagnosed with while overseas that resulted in heart failure. He eventually received a heart transplant from donor Reid Oliver in one of the show's final major storylines.

== Reception ==
The character of Chris Hughes came under some fire during Cosgrove's run because of his character being saved from a heart ailment while his rival Dr. Reid Oliver (Eric Sheffer Stevens) was sacrificed and killed off in the final week of the show. Chris returned to town in 2010 after being diagnosed with a failing heart and Reid was the only person who knew of his condition and who could cure him. Reid became a close friend and with the assistance of Katie, Chris came to terms with the end of his life. However, while in pursuit of a donor heart Reid was killed when his car was struck by a train.

With columnist Michael Fairman, Stevens praised his co-star Cosgrove over his professionalism and their character's growing from rivals to friends.

"I love playing with Daniel Cosgrove. He is a great, great, guy. Reid will help Chris along the way, and that is part of story."

—Eric Sheffer Stevens, Michael Fairman On-Air On-Soaps

The controversy arose because Reid, a gay character, was killed and his relationship with Luke Snyder sacrificed, while Chris and Katie, a heterosexual couple, were permitted to have a happy ending, with the characters marrying. While Stevens himself dismissed the decision of the writers to intentionally kill off a gay character, both characters' fan bases were at odds.
