= Craig Montgomery =

- As the World Turns character
- Jon Lindstrom as Craig Montgomery
- Portrayed by: Scott Bryce (1982–1994, 2007–2008); Hunt Block (2000–2005); Jeffrey Meek (2006–2007); Jon Lindstrom (2008–2010)
- Duration: 1982–1991; 1993–1994; 2000–2010
- First appearance: January 1982
- Last appearance: September 17, 2010
- Created by: Bridget and Jerome Dobson
- Introduced by: Mary-Ellis Bunim (1982); Laurence Caso (1993); Christopher Goutman (2000)
- Scott Bryce as Craig Montgomery

- Hunt Block as Craig Montgomery
In-universe information
- Occupation: Businessman
- Father: Bart Montgomery
- Mother: Lyla Peretti
- Sisters: Cricket Ross
- Half-sisters: Margo Hughes; Katie Peretti
- Spouse: Betsy Stewart (1983–84); Sierra Estaban (1987–2001); Barbara Ryan (2001–02); Rosanna Cabot (2003–04, 2005–07); Meg Snyder (2007–08)
- Sons: Bryant Montgomery; Gabriel Caras; Johnny Montgomery
- Daughters: Lucy Montgomery
- Nephews: Adam Munson; Casey Hughes; Billy Ross; Jacob Snyder
- Nieces: Suzanne Ross

Craig Montgomery is a fictional character on the CBS soap opera As the World Turns. He has been portrayed by Scott Bryce from 1982 to 1991, 1993 to 1994 and 2007 to 2008, Hunt Block from 2000 to 2005, Jeffrey Meek from 2006 to 2007, and Jon Lindstrom from 2008 to 2010.

== Casting ==
The role of Craig Montgomery has been played by four separate actors through the character's run. Scott Bryce appeared in the role from January 1982 to May 22, 1987, May 9, 1988 to November 1989, March 1990 to November 1990, March 1993 to December 1994 and April 10, 2007 to February 21, 2008. Hunt Block was the second actor to play the character from July 19, 2000 to October 31, 2005 before Jeffrey Meek joined from September 28, 2006 to April 2, 2007. Jon Lindstrom was the last actor to play the character, appearing from December 3, 2008 to September 10, 2010.

Bryce is often considered to be the most well known actor in the role and was nominated for the Daytime Emmy Award for Outstanding Lead Actor in a Drama Series in 1986 and 1987, as well as for two Soap Opera Digest Awards in 1986 and 1988. Following his final appearance on the show, Bryce appeared on ABC's One Life to Live as Dr Crosby in 2006 and eventually co-created and executive produced the web series Steamboat with Michael O'Leary of Guiding Light. The series was intended to become a cable television show until it was broadcast on the Internet. Block is also known for his daytime roles including Ben Warren on CBS' Guiding Light, Lee Ramsey on One Life to Live and Guy Donohue on All My Children. Following his exit, he also appeared in the 2010 feature film Salt, which starred Angelina Jolie and Liev Schreiber. Meek has had a career all throughout television including The WB series Charmed and also appeared on the soap opera Search for Tomorrow.

Lindstrom took over the role after the exit of Bryce. He is a veteran of daytime dramas, having most notably played the character of Kevin Collins on ABC's General Hospital from 1993 to 1997 and 2004 and on the show's spin-off Port Charles from 1997 to 2003. He also played Kevin's twin brother Ryan Chamberlain on GH from 1992 to 1995. His other daytime roles include Brady Chapin on Rituals in 1984, Mark McCormick on NBC's Santa Barbara from 1985 to 1986 and Paul Jarre on Generations in 1989. Lindstom was also nominated for a Daytime Emmy Award for Outstanding Lead Actor in a Drama Series for his role on ATWT in 2010. Lindstrom was also pre-nominated for the award in 2011. After the end of ATWT, Lindstom continues to act and most recently appeared in the romantic comedy What Happens Next in 2012, co-starring Wendie Malick, who stars on the TV Land sitcom Hot in Cleveland. The actor also appeared on the CBS series Blue Bloods in 2011 released a CD with his band The High Lonesome that same year.

== Family and relationships ==
Craig Montgomery is the son of Bart Montgomery and Lyla Crawford, making him the brother of Margo Montgomery Hughes, Cricket Montgomery and Katie Peretti. His relationships often surround Lucinda Walsh and her daughter Sierra Esteban. While he was married to Sierra and had two children with her including Bryant and Lucy Montgomery, his attraction for Lucinda eventually resulted in their contempt for one another and battles in business. Craig is often involved in mysterious business dealings and his attempts for power tended to cloud his judgement when it came to what was best for his family. He was also married to Betsy Stewart, Barbara Ryan, Rosanna Cabot, whom he adopted their son Cabot Sinclair with, and Meg Snyder. His children also include Gabriel Caras and Johnny Montgomery, products of affairs with Lydia Caras and Jennifer Munson.
