= Susan Stewart (As the World Turns) =

- As the World Turns character
- Marie Masters as Susan Stewart
- Portrayed by: Connie Scott (1965–67); Diana Walker (1967); Jada Rowland (1967–68); Leslie Perkins (1968); Marie Masters (1968–2010); Judith Barcroft (1978, temp)
- Duration: 1965–1979, 1986–2010
- First appearance: February 25, 1965
- Last appearance: September 17, 2010
- Created by: Irna Phillips
- Introduced by: Ted Corday (1965); Robert Calhoun (1986)
In-universe information
- Occupation: Physician
- Parents: Fred Burke; Julia Burke
- Spouse: Dan Stewart (1966–67); Bruce Baxter (1967); Larry McDermott (1991–96); Rick Decker (2003)
- Daughters: Emily Stewart
- Adoptive daughters: Alison Stewart
- Grandchildren: Alison Stewart (biological); Daniel Hughes; Lyon Hunter

Susan Stewart (also Burke, Baxter, McDermott and Decker) is a fictional character from the defunct American soap opera As the World Turns. While several actresses have played Susan, the role is most identified with Marie Masters, who played Susan for most of the character's run. Masters stepped into the role on October 18, 1968. Susan was at the center of several stories until the character (and Masters) left the show in 1979, before returning in 1986. Susan was known for her dysfunctional personality and scheming nature. A reformed alcoholic and respected physician, she played a supporting role in later years offering advice to her two daughters, Alison and Emily, who inherited their mother's penchant for controversy and trouble.

== Storylines ==
=== 1965–79 ===
Susan first comes to Oakdale in 1965 as the girlfriend of Dan Stewart. They had married while they were both attending medical school and not, long after they graduated, Susan intentionally caused a miscarriage. As they tried to move past the tragedy, Dan became acquainted with Elizabeth Talbot. Liz was more laid back than Susan, who cared deeply about her own career. Susan noticed her husband's new friendship and quickly set about trying to make a couple out of Liz and Dan's brother, Paul Stewart. Susan's relentlessness drove Dan closer to Liz, however, and Susan didn't know what to do. Ultimately, Dan asked for a divorce, but she didn't want to give him up. At the advice of his mother, Ellen, Susan took advantage of him one night and became pregnant. Dan was upset to learn about the pregnancy, but he became even more saddened when Liz married Paul.

Dan was more than upset with Susan and, in the heat of an argument, pushed her down a staircase, causing her to lose her baby. As Susan recovered, she tried to keep Dan interested in her. She tried to make him jealous by seeing Dr. John Dixon, one of his colleagues, but nothing worked for her. Susan then turned to force tactics in keeping her marriage together when she learned that Dan and Liz had had an affair and that Liz was pregnant with a daughter Betsy. She threatened to expose the truth to Paul unless Dan stayed with her. Dan succumbed to her power over him and she became expectant again. This time, a daughter was born, named Emily.

Dan was finally rid of Susan when she became interested in Bruce Baxter. Bruce did not want children, so Susan divorced Dan and gave him full custody of Emily. Dan married Liz (Paul died of a brain tumor never learning that Betsy's father was his own brother.), and they lived together with their daughter Betsy (who believed that Paul was her father) and now Emily too. Susan knew that Bruce didn't want children, but she figured that after a while, she could make him change his mind. She realized his mind was made up, however, when he told her about his vasectomy. Susan had the marriage annulled. She found her heart wandering back to Dan and, while visiting with Emily at the Stewart home one day, she and Liz got into an argument. Liz saw baby Emily at the top of the stairs and in a rush to save her, she ran up the stairs, falling, and rupturing her spleen. Liz was taken to the hospital where she died.

A devastated Dan left the country with Emily. Susan became an alcoholic, constantly wallowing in her own grief. She spent most of her time with her beer-buddy Kevin Thompson, to whom she was attracted. Dan and Emily came back to town, but now Susan was too drunk to raise her own daughter. Susan also had a one-night fling with Jay Stallings, who was engaged to Carol Demming Hughes. She briefly dated Mark Holloway, who warned Jay to stay away from Susan. Dan became involved with Kim Reynolds Dixon, who was divorced from John. Susan, ever competitive and ambitious, wanted to work things out with Dan again. Kim had had amnesia for a time and, because of John, who was just as clingy as Susan, she did not know of the love she and Dan had shared. Once her memory returned, she called Dan to let him know that she remembered, but Susan hid the answering machine tape that the message was on. When Dan, still believing that Kim forgot him, started to see Valerie Conway, Susan confessed the truth about what she did to Kevin. Kevin was good friends with Valerie and urged Susan to tell the truth. She did, and Dan and Kim were married.

Her drinking became much worse. When she was fired from Memorial Hospital, she appeared before the hospital board in a drunken stupor, accusing the administrator of having personal problems with her. She arrested for drunk and disorderly conduct and Kevin let her stay in jail for the night. When she was set free, Susan was upset, but Kevin soon helped her realize that she had become an alcoholic. Susan decided to change the things in her life, and unfortunately for Kevin, that meant ending their relationship. With Kevin soon killed in an accident and Dan dead from a terminal illness, Susan left town sober, with daughter Emily in tow.

=== 1986–2010 ===
In 1986, Emily came back to Oakdale for a brand new start in an old town. Oakdale soon learned that Emily and James Stenbeck had been lovers.

Susan came back to Oakdale looking for Emily, and reconnected with several old acquaintances, including John Dixon. She offered support to John and Kim's son Andy as he struggled with his own alcoholism. Susan suffered a nasty fall and injured her back, and subsequently became addicted to painkillers. Her doctor, Bob Hughes, tried his hardest to help her quit. Bob was preoccupied with Susan's recovery while Kim and John were distracted by Andy's struggles. The newfound friendship led to a one-night stand between Bob and Susan. At the time, however, Bob was married to Kim. The rivalry that the two women had a decade earlier was revived by the affair.

Susan found love again with the much younger Larry McDermott. Susan wanted to give Larry a child, but she couldn't. Emily, now in her early 20s, came to her mother's rescue and offered to donate the egg. Emily donated the egg, Larry donated the sperm, but it was Susan who carried the baby, a girl named Alison, to term. Larry had an affair and left town; Susan decided to keep the circumstances regarding Alison's birth a secret from the little girl and even changed her name from Alison McDermott to Alison Stewart.

Needless to say, Alison found out the truth and tormented her mother and sister. The teenaged Alison was a rebel who sought the affections of Aaron Snyder in a way similar to her mother's own quest for Dan Stewart's love. In order to get Aaron's attention, Alison committed arson. She turned herself into the police, but Susan was able to help her get released quickly.

Susan's love life became active again when she met Rick Decker. Rick was a suspicious man that she met at a medical convention and both Alison and Emily felt uneasy about him. They didn't approve of their mother's new relationship, but that didn't stop Susan from accepting Rick's marriage proposal. At the same time, he was accused of several murders that took place at the hospital. Susan didn't pay any attention to the accusations and proceeded with marrying Rick. The fairy tale ended as Susan started to catch Rick in lies. He admitted to suffering from anxiety attacks and asked Susan to leave town with him so that he could get psychiatric help. Susan agreed to leave with him, but once they were gone, Susan read a newspaper headline that said that Alison had been found murdered. She rushed back to town and was shocked when Rick confessed to being the killer. Alison was not dead, however. The newspaper article was faked as a way to lure them back to Oakdale. Rick also admitted that he was only interested in Susan because of her ability to get him work at Memorial Hospital. Susan was heartbroken and depressed, but she made peace with Alison and Emily as Rick was carted away. Alison soon left town to be with Aaron.

After the ordeal with Rick finally cooled down, Susan's life as a whole became less eventful. She stood by Emily through some of her more controversial decisions (including attempting to murder Paul Ryan, among other things) and served, essentially, as Emily's enabler. In 2007, however, the reveal of two disturbing secrets about her daughters drove Susan back to the bottle. First, she learned of Alison's infamy as a Las Vegas porn actress (not to mention an addiction to crystal meth), and then found that Emily had been working as a call girl. Susan was devastated, and alcohol proved to be her only friend. She soon realized, however, that going back to that habit would not be setting a proper example for Alison. Together, the two women worked to give up the addictive substances that had worked so hard against them. While things seemed to be getting better for the Stewarts, Susan again found herself in a position between her daughters. Emily found out that Alison had had an affair with Dusty and skipped town, leaving Susan in Oakdale to try to help her daughter pick up the pieces.
