= List of Daytime Emmy Award winners in acting and drama =

This is a list of annual Daytime Emmy Award winners for Best Drama Series and Best Lead Actress/Actor, Supporting Actress/Actor and Younger Actress/Actor in a Drama Series.

== 1974-2019 ==
Year	Best Drama	Lead Actress	Lead Actor	Supporting Actress	Supporting Actor	Younger Actress	Younger Actor
1974	The Doctors (NBC)	Elizabeth Hubbard (The Doctors)	Macdonald Carey (Days of our Lives)	No award given	No award given	No award given	No award given
1975	The Young and the Restless (CBS)	Susan Flannery (Days of our Lives)	Macdonald Carey (Days of our Lives)	No award given	No award given	No award given	No award given
1976	Another World (NBC)	Helen Gallagher (Ryan's Hope)	Larry Haines (Search for Tomorrow)	No award given	No award given	No award given	No award given
1977	Ryan's Hope (ABC)	Helen Gallagher (Ryan's Hope)	Val Dufour (Search for Tomorrow)	No award given	No award given	No award given	No award given
1978	Days of Our Lives (NBC)	Laurie Heineman (Another World)	James Pritchett (The Doctors)	No award given	No award given	No award given	No award given
1979	Ryan's Hope (ABC)	Irene Dailey (Another World)	Al Freeman Jr. (One Life to Live)	Suzanne Rogers (Days of our Lives)	Peter Hansen (General Hospital)	No award given	No award given
1980	Guiding Light (CBS)	Judith Light (One Life to Live)	Douglass Watson (Another World)	Francesca James (All My Children)	Warren Burton (All My Children)	No award given	No award given
1981	General Hospital (ABC)	Judith Light (One Life to Live)	Douglass Watson (Another World)	Jane Elliot (General Hospital)	Larry Haines (Search for Tomorrow)	No award given	No award given
1982	Guiding Light (CBS)	Robin Strasser (One Life to Live)	Anthony Geary (General Hospital)	Dorothy Lyman (All My Children)	David Lewis (General Hospital)	No award given	No award given
1983	The Young and the Restless (CBS)	Dorothy Lyman (All My Children)	Robert S. Woods (One Life to Live)	Louise Shaffer (Ryan's Hope)	Darnell Williams (All My Children)	No award given	No award given
1984	General Hospital (ABC)	Erika Slezak (One Life to Live)	Larry Bryggman (As the World Turns)	Judi Evans (Guiding Light)	Justin Deas (As the World Turns)	No award given	No award given
1985	The Young and the Restless (CBS)	Kim Zimmer (Guiding Light)	Darnell Williams (All My Children)	Beth Maitland (The Young and the Restless)	Larry Gates (Guiding Light)	Tracey E. Bregman (The Young and the Restless)	Brian Bloom (As the World Turns)
1986	The Young and the Restless (CBS)	Erika Slezak (One Life to Live)	David Canary (All My Children)	Leann Hunley (Days of our Lives)	John Wesley Shipp (As the World Turns)	Ellen Wheeler (Another World)	Michael E. Knight (All My Children)
1987	As the World Turns (CBS)	Kim Zimmer (Guiding Light)	Larry Bryggman (As the World Turns)	Kathleen Noone (All My Children)	Gregg Marx (As the World Turns)	Martha Byrne (As the World Turns)	Michael E. Knight (All My Children)
1988	Santa Barbara (NBC)	Helen Gallagher (Ryan's Hope)	David Canary (All My Children)	Ellen Wheeler (All My Children)	Justin Deas (Santa Barbara)	Julianne Moore (As the World Turns)	Billy Warlock (Days of our Lives)
1989	Santa Barbara (NBC)	Marcy Walker (Santa Barbara)	David Canary (All My Children)	Debbi Morgan (All My Children) / Nancy Lee Grahn (Santa Barbara)	Justin Deas (Santa Barbara)	Kimberly McCullough (General Hospital)	Justin Gocke (Santa Barbara)
1990	Santa Barbara (NBC)	Kim Zimmer (Guiding Light)	A Martinez (Santa Barbara)	Julia Barr (All My Children)	Henry Darrow (Santa Barbara)	Cady McClain (All My Children)	Andy Kavovit (As the World Turns)
1991	As the World Turns (CBS)	Finola Hughes (General Hospital)	Peter Bergman (The Young and the Restless)	Jess Walton (The Young and the Restless)	Bernard Barrow (Loving)	Anne Heche (Another World)	Rick Hearst (Guiding Light)
1992	All My Children (ABC)	Erika Slezak (One Life to Live)	Peter Bergman (The Young and the Restless)	Maeve Kinkead (Guiding Light)	Thom Christopher (One Life to Live)	Tricia Cast (The Young and the Restless)	Kristoff St. John (The Young and the Restless)
1993	The Young and the Restless (CBS)	Linda Dano (Another World)	David Canary (All My Children)	Ellen Parker (Guiding Light)	Gerald Anthony (General Hospital)	Heather Tom (The Young and the Restless)	Monti Sharp (Guiding Light)
1994	All My Children (ABC)	Hillary B. Smith (One Life to Live)	Michael Zaslow (Guiding Light)	Susan Haskell (One Life to Live)	Justin Deas (Guiding Light)	Melissa Hayden (Guiding Light)	Roger Howarth (One Life to Live)
1995	General Hospital (ABC)	Erika Slezak (One Life to Live)	Justin Deas (Guiding Light)	Rena Sofer (General Hospital)	Jerry verDorn (Guiding Light)	Sarah Michelle Gellar (All My Children)	Jonathan Jackson (General Hospital)
1996	General Hospital (ABC)	Erika Slezak (One Life to Live)	Charles Keating (Another World)	Anna Kathryn Holbrook (Another World)	Jerry verDorn (Guiding Light)	Kimberly McCullough (General Hospital)	Kevin Mambo (Guiding Light)
1997	General Hospital (ABC)	Jess Walton (The Young and the Restless)	Justin Deas (Guiding Light)	Michelle Stafford (The Young and the Restless)	Ian Buchanan (The Bold and the Beautiful)	Sarah Brown (General Hospital)	Kevin Mambo (Guiding Light)
1998	All My Children (ABC)	Cynthia Watros (Guiding Light)	Eric Braeden (The Young and the Restless)	Julia Barr (All My Children)	Steve Burton (General Hospital)	Sarah Brown (General Hospital)	Jonathan Jackson (General Hospital)
1999	General Hospital (ABC)	Susan Lucci (All My Children)	Anthony Geary (General Hospital)	Sharon Case (The Young and the Restless)	Stuart Damon (General Hospital)	Heather Tom (The Young and the Restless)	Jonathan Jackson (General Hospital)
2000	General Hospital (ABC)	Susan Flannery (The Bold and the Beautiful)	Anthony Geary (General Hospital)	Sarah Brown (General Hospital)	Shemar Moore (The Young and the Restless)	Camryn Grimes (The Young and the Restless)	David Tom (The Young and the Restless)
2001	As the World Turns (CBS)	Martha Byrne (As the World Turns)	David Canary (All My Children)	Lesli Kay (As the World Turns)	Michael E. Knight (All My Children)	Adrienne Frantz (The Bold and the Beautiful)	Justin Torkildsen (The Bold and the Beautiful)
2002	One Life to Live (ABC)	Susan Flannery (The Bold and the Beautiful)	Peter Bergman (The Young and the Restless)	Crystal Chappell (Guiding Light)	Josh Duhamel (All My Children)	Jennifer Finnigan (The Bold and the Beautiful)	Jacob Young (General Hospital)
2003	As the World Turns (CBS)	Susan Flannery (The Bold and the Beautiful)	Maurice Benard (General Hospital)	Vanessa Marcil (General Hospital)	Benjamin Hendrickson (As the World Turns)	Jennifer Finnigan (The Bold and the Beautiful)	Jordi Vilasuso (Guiding Light)
2004	The Young and the Restless (CBS)	Michelle Stafford (The Young and the Restless)	Anthony Geary (General Hospital)	Cady McClain (As the World Turns)	Rick Hearst (General Hospital)	Jennifer Finnigan (The Bold and the Beautiful)	Chad Brannon (General Hospital)
2005	General Hospital (ABC)	Erika Slezak (One Life to Live)	Christian Jules LeBlanc (The Young and the Restless)	Natalia Livingston (General Hospital)	Greg Rikaart (The Young and the Restless)	Eden Riegel (All My Children)	David Lago (The Young and the Restless)
2006	General Hospital (ABC)	Kim Zimmer (Guiding Light)	Anthony Geary (General Hospital)	Gina Tognoni (Guiding Light)	Jordan Clarke (Guiding Light)	Jennifer Landon (As the World Turns)	Tom Pelphrey (Guiding Light)
2007	Guiding Light (CBS) / The Young and the Restless (CBS)	Maura West (As the World Turns)	Christian LeBlanc (The Young and the Restless)	Genie Francis (General Hospital)	Rick Hearst (General Hospital)	Jennifer Landon (As the World Turns)	Bryton McClure (The Young and the Restless)
2008	General Hospital (ABC)	Jeanne Cooper (The Young and the Restless)	Anthony Geary (General Hospital)	Gina Tognoni (Guiding Light)	Kristoff St. John (The Young and the Restless)	Jennifer Landon (As the World Turns)	Tom Pelphrey (Guiding Light)
2009	The Bold and the Beautiful (CBS)	Susan Haskell (One Life to Live)	Christian LeBlanc (The Young and the Restless)	Tamara Braun (Days of our Lives)	Vincent Irizarry (All My Children); Jeff Branson (Guiding Light)	Julie Berman (General Hospital)	Darin Brooks (Days of our Lives)
2010	The Bold and the Beautiful (CBS)	Maura West (As the World Turns)	Michael Park (As the World Turns)	Julie Pinson (As the World Turns)	Billy Miller (The Young and the Restless)	Julie Berman (General Hospital)	Drew Tyler Bell (The Bold and the Beautiful)
2011	The Bold and the Beautiful (CBS)	Laura Wright (General Hospital)	Michael Park (As the World Turns)	Heather Tom (The Bold and the Beautiful)	Jonathan Jackson (General Hospital)	Brittany Allen (All My Children)	Scott Clifton (The Bold and the Beautiful)
2012	General Hospital (ABC)	Heather Tom (The Bold and the Beautiful)	Anthony Geary (General Hospital)	Nancy Lee Grahn (General Hospital)	Jonathan Jackson (General Hospital)	Christel Khalil (The Young and the Restless)	Chandler Massey (Days of our Lives)
2013	Days of Our Lives (NBC)	Heather Tom (The Bold and the Beautiful)	Doug Davidson (The Young and the Restless)	Julie Marie Berman (General Hospital)	Scott Clifton (The Bold and the Beautiful); Billy Miller (The Young and the Restless)	Kristen Alderson (General Hospital)	Chandler Massey (Days of our Lives)
2014	The Young and the Restless (CBS)	Eileen Davidson (Days Of Our Lives)	Billy Miller (The Young and the Restless)	Amelia Heinle (The Young and the Restless)	Eric Martsolf (Days of Our Lives)	Hunter King (The Young and the Restless)	Chandler Massey (Days of our Lives)
2015	Days of Our Lives (NBC) / The Young and the Restless (CBS)	Maura West (General Hospital)	Anthony Geary (General Hospital)	Amelia Heinle (The Young and the Restless)	Chad Duell (General Hospital)	Hunter King (The Young and the Restless)	Freddie Smith (Days of Our Lives)
2016	General Hospital (ABC)	Mary Beth Evans (Days of Our Lives)	Tyler Christopher (General Hospital)	Jessica Collins (The Young and the Restless)	Sean Blakemore (General Hospital)	True O'Brien (Days of Our Lives)	Bryan Craig (General Hospital)
2017	General Hospital (ABC)	Gina Tognoni (The Young and the Restless)	Scott Clifton (The Bold and the Beautiful)	Kate Mansi (Days of Our Lives)	Steve Burton (The Young and the Restless)	Lexi Ainsworth (General Hospital)	Bryan Craig (General Hospital)
2018	Days of Our Lives (NBC)	Eileen Davidson (The Young and the Restless)	James Reynolds (Days of Our Lives)	Camryn Grimes (The Young and the Restless)	Greg Vaughan (Days of Our Lives)	Chloe Lanier (General Hospital)	Rome Flynn (The Bold and the Beautiful)
2019	The Young and the Restless (CBS)	Jacqueline MacInnes Wood (The Bold and the Beautiful)	Maurice Benard (General Hospital)	Vernee Watson (General Hospital)	Max Gail (General Hospital)	Hayley Erin (General Hospital)	Kyler Pettis (Days of Our Lives)

== 2020-present ==
The categories, Outstanding Younger Actor and Younger Actress were merged into Outstanding Younger Performer in a Drama Series.

Year	Best Drama	Lead Actress	Lead Actor	Supporting Actress	Supporting Actor	Younger Performer
2020	The Young and the Restless (CBS)	Heather Tom (The Bold and the Beautiful)	Jason Thompson (The Young and the Restless)	Tamara Braun (General Hospital)	Bryton James (The Young and the Restless)	Olivia Rose Keegan (Days of Our Lives)
2021	General Hospital (ABC)	Jacqueline MacInnes Wood (The Bold and the Beautiful)	Maurice Benard (General Hospital)	Marla Adams (The Young and the Restless)	Max Gail (General Hospital)	Victoria Konefal (Days of Our Lives)
2022	General Hospital (ABC)	Mishael Morgan (The Young and the Restless)	John McCook (The Bold and the Beautiful)	Kelly Thiebaud (General Hospital)	Jeff Kober (General Hospital)	Nicholas Chavez (General Hospital)
2023	General Hospital (ABC)	Jacqueline MacInnes Wood (The Bold and the Beautiful)	Thorsten Kaye (The Bold and the Beautiful)	Sonya Eddy (General Hospital)	Robert Gossett (General Hospital)	Eden McCoy (General Hospital)
2024	General Hospital (ABC)	Michelle Stafford (The Young and the Restless)	Thorsten Kaye (The Bold and the Beautiful)	Courtney Hope (The Young and the Restless)	Robert Gossett (General Hospital)	Category retired
2025	General Hospital (ABC)	Nancy Lee Grahn (General Hospital)	Paul Telfer (Days of Our Lives)	Susan Walters (The Young and the Restless)	Jonathan Jackson (General Hospital)	Category retired
