= Jack Snyder (As the World Turns) =

- As the World Turns character
- Portrayed by: Michael Park
- Duration: 1997–2010
- First appearance: April 1, 1997
- Last appearance: September 17, 2010
- Created by: Stephen Demorest, Mel Brez and Addie Walsh
- Introduced by: Felicia Minei Behr
In-universe information
- Other names: Jake Logan; Jimmy Harrison; Jack Jackson
- Occupation: Detective at the Oakdale PD; Former Part time security guard at WOAK; Former Part time detective at the Oakdale PD; Former Full time detective at the Oakdale PD; Former Singer/piano player at Costello's; Former Federal agent
- Parents: Bert Snyder (father; deceased); Dolores Snyder Pierce (mother; deceased)
- Siblings: Brad Snyder (brother; deceased)
- Spouse: Julia Lindsay (2000–01); Carly Tenney (2002–03, 2003–06, 2010–); Julia Larrabee (2003); Katie Peretti (2007); Janet Ciccone (2008–10)
- Children: Parker Snyder (adoptive); J. J. Snyder (adoptive); Sage Snyder; Unnamed child
- Aunts and uncles: Harvey Snyder; Henry Snyder
- Nieces and nephews: Liberty Ciccone; Jacob Snyder
- First cousins: Seth Snyder; Iva Snyder (adoptive); Holden Snyder; Caleb Snyder; Ellie Snyder; Meg Snyder; Josh Snyder (adoptive)
- Other relatives: Emma Snyder

Jack Snyder is a character on the American soap opera As the World Turns. He was portrayed by actor Michael Park from April 1, 1997 until the final episode on September 17, 2010.

== Reception ==
For portraying Jack Snyder, Michael Park won two Daytime Emmy Awards for Outstanding Lead Actor in a Drama Series in 2010 and 2011 respectively.

== See also ==
- Jack Snyder and Carly Tenney
