= Outstanding Lead Actor in a Drama Series =

Outstanding Lead Actor in a Drama Series can mean one of two Emmy Awards:

- Daytime Emmy Award for Outstanding Lead Actor in a Drama Series (from 1974 on)
- Primetime Emmy Award for Outstanding Lead Actor in a Drama Series (from the 1950s on)
