= Peter Simon (actor) =

American actor (born 1943)

- Born: September 27, 1943 (age 82); New York City, New York, U.S.
- Education: Williams College
- Occupation: Actor
- Years active: 1968 - present
- Spouse: Courtney Simon (m. 1975)
- Children: 4

Peter Simon (born September 27, 1943) is an American actor. He is best known for playing the role of Dr. Ed Bauer on the CBS soap opera Guiding Light, off and on from 1981 until the show's final episodes in 2009. He received a Daytime Emmy Award nomination for Outstanding Lead Actor in 1994 for his role on Guiding Light.

== Early life ==
Simon was born in New York City, New York. He studied acting at the Phillips Exeter Academy and attended Williams College in Williamstown, Massachusetts. He became a member of the professional repertory theater company at Purdue University, and spent a season at The Barn Theatre in Michigan.

== Career ==
Simon has done theater work as an actor and a playwright. His play, Sabbat, received its world premiere at his alma mater, Williams College, in 1968, directed by Keith Fowler, who was then a Williams faculty member.

He played Sebastian in Twelfth Night at New York's Delacorte Theater in August 1969. A play written by Simon, In Case of Accident, was produced Off Broadway in 1972. In March 1978, he played Jimmy in a production of P.S. Your Cat is Dead at the Promenade Theater.

Simon appeared on The Edge of Night before being cast as Scott Phillips on Search for Tomorrow (1969 to 1979). After leaving Search for Tomorrow, he played Ian MacFarland on As the World Turns in 1979.

In 1981, he began playing his most high-profile daytime role as Dr. Ed Bauer on the long-running CBS soap opera Guiding Light. He played the role from 1981 to 1984, then left to focus on theater work. He returned for a second run from 1986 to 1996. He received a 1994 Daytime Emmy Award nomination for Outstanding Lead Actor for his work on Guiding Light.

After several attempts to woo Simon back, Guiding Light convinced Simon to return to the show for a third run in 2002. However, Simon publicly expressed disapproval during a controversial storyline that unfolded in 2003 and 2004. The storyline (regarding mysterious characters Maryanne and Carrie Carruthers) received criticism for revising past show history, and drew disdain from Simon in the press regarding a particular scene where it was written that Ed had to strike his daughter. Simon left the show again in 2004.

Simon made a final return to Guiding Light along with the actors that played his daughter Michelle Bauer Santos (Nancy St. Alban) and son-in-law Danny Santos (Paul Anthony Stewart), in June 2009, appearing several times prior to the show's final episodes in September 2009.

== Filmography ==
=== Television ===
Year	Title	Role	Notes
1969 or before (?)	The Edge of Night	Unknown role	Daytime serial
1969-1977	Search for Tomorrow	Scott Phillips	Daytime serial (contract role)
1979-1980	As the World Turns	Ian McFarland	Daytime serial (contract role)
1981-1984; 1986-1996; 2002-2004; 2009	Guiding Light	Dr. William "Ed" Bauer Jr. #3	Daytime serial (contract role) For Daytime Emmy info, see Awards and nominations section below for details
1983	The Cradle Will Fall	Dr. William "Ed" Bauer Jr. #3	Television movie (CBS)

== Awards and nominations ==
Year	Award	Category	Work	Result
1994	Daytime Emmy Award	Outstanding Lead Actor in a Drama Series	Guiding Light	Nominated

== Personal life ==
He met Courtney Simon when they were both on Search for Tomorrow (she played Kathy Phillips). They were married to other people at the time, but they eventually divorced their spouses and married each other. He has a son and two daughters from his first marriage and a stepdaughter from Courtney's first marriage. Together, the Simons are parents of Kate Hall, a writer who has worked on The Young and the Restless, General Hospital, and All My Children.
