= Scott Clifton =

American television actor

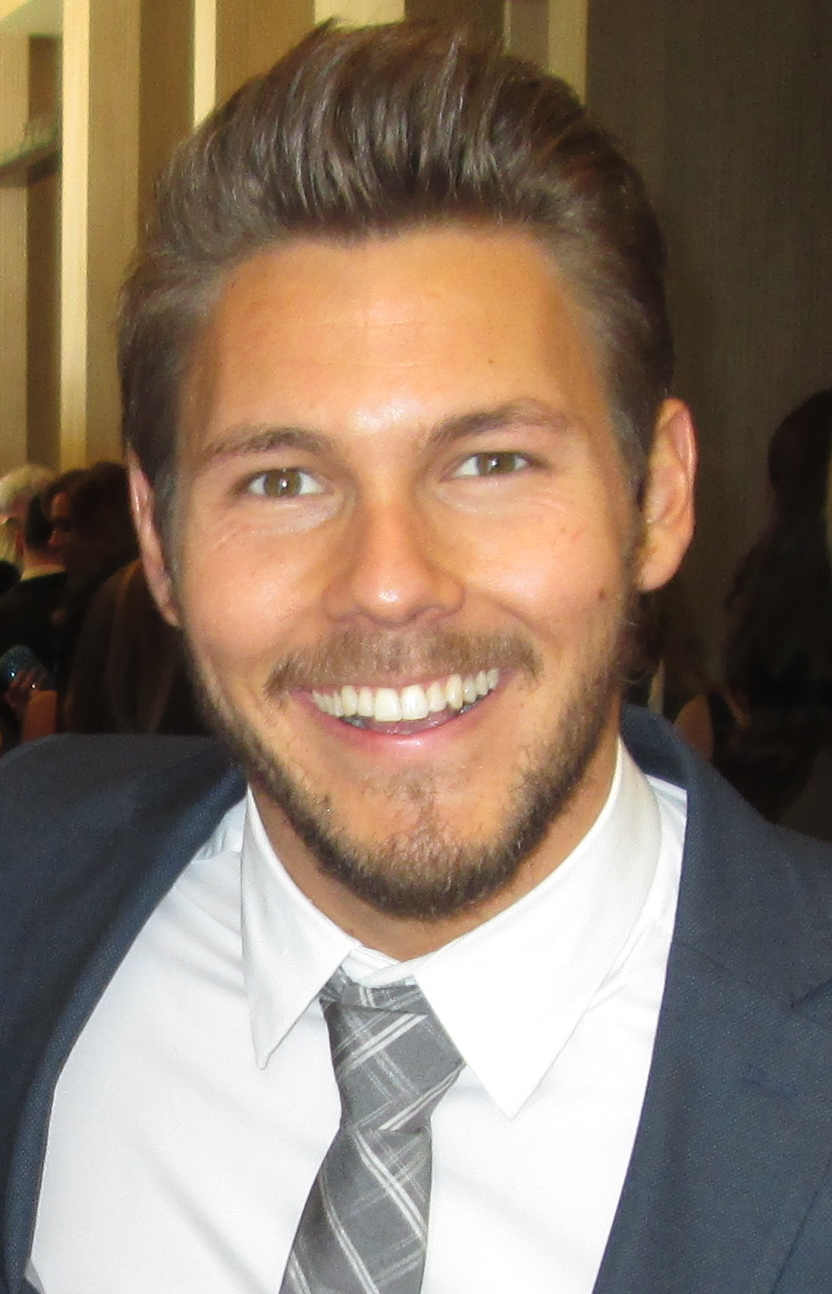
- Clifton attending the 41st Annual Daytime Emmy Awards Nominee Reception
- Born: Scott Clifton Snyder; October 31, 1984 (age 42); Los Angeles, California, U.S.
- Occupation: Actor
- Years active: 2001–present
- Spouse: Nicole Lampson (m. 2012; sep. 2023)
- Children: 1
- Awards: See below

YouTube information
- Channel: Theoretical Bullshit
- Years active: 2007–present
- Genres: Atheism; philosophy; ethics
- Subscribers: 60.8 thousand
- Views: 4.18 million
- Last updated: December 8, 2025
- Website: scottclifton.com

Scott Clifton Snyder (born October 31, 1984), better known as Scott Clifton, is an American actor. He played Dillon Quartermaine in General Hospital (2003–2007), Schuyler Joplin in One Life to Live (2009–2010), and Liam Spencer in The Bold and the Beautiful (2010–present). He has won four Daytime Emmy Awards.

== Early life and family ==
Clifton was born on October 31, 1984, the only child of Ron and Faye Snyder, in Los Angeles, United States. His father is of Russian Jewish descent, and his mother has Scottish ancestry. He was raised in the Greater Los Angeles Area of southern California, including the Santa Clarita Valley and the San Fernando Valley.

== Acting career ==
=== Early roles and success ===
Clifton started acting in commercials at the age of 16. His early roles included appearances on shows such as Roswell, Undressed, and Judging Amy.

He is best known for playing Dillon Quartermaine in General Hospital (2003-2007), Schuyler Joplin in One Life to Live (2009-2010), and Liam Spencer in The Bold and the Beautiful (2010–present). His role in B&B earned him three Daytime Emmy Awards in 2011, 2013, and 2017.

== Musical career ==
Clifton is also a singer, guitarist, and songwriter.

In an initial bid to launch his musical career, he uploaded several songs to the internet, and later compiled these songs among previously unpublished material on his first EP album, Untitled. He later released a second EP, Unbeautiful, as well as two full-length albums, So Much for the Nightlife (in 2006) and Mannequin. Each was produced by Jeff Pescetto. He then released Girl Go Home.

== Personal life ==
Clifton married his longtime girlfriend Nicole Lampson on October 20, 2012. Their wedding was attended by some The Bold and the Beautiful co-stars: John McCook, Don Diamont, Ronn Moss, Adam Gregory, Kim Matula, Jacqueline MacInnes Wood and many others. On May 6, 2016, they welcomed their first child, a son. In February 2023, Clifton announced his separation from Lampson.

Clifton is an atheist. On July 19, 2020, he co-hosted episode 24.29 of The Atheist Experience with Matt Dillahunty. Clifton also has a YouTube channel where he discusses arguments made by theists. One particular video often referenced is the "Treatise on Morality" which defines objective morality as the following:

"A particular action or choice is moral or right when it somehow promotes happiness, well-being, or health, or it somehow minimizes unnecessary harm or suffering or does both. A particular action or choice is immoral or wrong when it somehow diminishes happiness, well-being, or health, or it somehow causes unnecessary harm or suffering, or again, it does both."

== Filmography ==
=== Film and television performances ===
- (2002): Terminal Error as Jock
- (2004): Arizona Summer as Brooke
- (2006): The Death Strip as Mike Kohler

List of acting performances in television
| Title | Year | Role | Notes |
|---|---|---|---|
| Roswell | 2001 | Evan | Guest appearance: "Heart of Mine" Season 2, Episode 16 (2001-04-16) |
| Undressed | 2001 | Caleb | Guest appearances: Season 5, Episode 29 (2001-08-28); Season 5, Episode 30 (2001-08-29); Season 5, Episode 31 (2001-08-30); Season 5, Episode 32 (2001-09-03) |
| Judging Amy | 2002 | Thomas Delancey | Guest appearance: "Boys to Men" Season 4, Episode 9 (2002-11-26) |
| General Hospital | 2003 – 2007 | Dillon Quartermaine | |
| One Life to Live | 2009 – 2010 | Schuyler Joplin | 154 episodes |
| The Bold and the Beautiful | 2010 – present | Liam Spencer | |

=== Television appearances ===
List of appearances as himself in television
| Title | Year | Notes |
|---|---|---|
| Soap Talk | 2003 – 2006 | Talk show: 2003-12-10; 2004-08-09; 2005-01-05; 2006-07-04 |
| 1 Day With | 2004 | Reality Show. Season No.1 Episode No.3 (2004-09-18) |
| Soapography | 2004 | Documentary (2004–06) |
| Family Feud | 2005 | Game show. "Naughty vs. Nice" (2005-11-07) |
| The View | 2006 | Talk show. Episode No.526 (2006-02-08) |
| 33rd Daytime Emmy Award Nominations Announcement | 2006 | Daytime Emmy nominee co-announcer with Alexa Havins (2006-02-08) |

=== Other media ===
| Title | Year | Role | Notes |
|---|---|---|---|
| Life in General | 2008 | Fritz Snyder | Web television series created during the 2007–2008 Writers Guild of America strike. |
| Summer Nights | 2009 | Himself | SOAPnet promotional music video. Various soap opera actors perform "Summer Nights", from the Grease soundtrack. |
| Tactics | 2016 | Ben | Short film, directed by Patrick Fogarty, written by Elizabeth Mihelich |

== Discography ==
=== Studio albums ===
| Year | Albums | Notes |
|---|---|---|
| | So Much for the Nightlife: Released: – 2011; Label: –; Formats: CD | |
| | Mannequin: Released: – 2011; Label: –; Formats: CD | |

=== Extended plays ===
| Year | Albums | Notes |
|---|---|---|
| | Untitled: Released: – 2011; Label: –; Formats: CD | |
| | Unbeautiful: Released: – 2011; Label: –; Formats: CD | |

=== Other appearances ===
| Year | Details | Notes |
|---|---|---|
| 2006 | ABC: A Holiday Affair: Released: November 21, 2006; Label: Buena Vista; Formats: CD | A compilation of Christmas themed music by various ABC soap opera actors.: Song Title: "Little Drummer Boy"; Track: No.9; Time: 2:27 |

== Awards and nominations ==
Awards and nominations for Scott Clifton
| Year | Award | Category | Work | Result | Ref. |
|---|---|---|---|---|---|
| 2004 | Daytime Emmy Award | Outstanding Younger Actor in a Drama Series | General Hospital | Nominated | |
| 2005 | Daytime Emmy Award | Outstanding Younger Actor in a Drama Series | General Hospital | Nominated | |
| 2005 | Soap Opera Digest Award | Outstanding Younger Lead Actor | General Hospital | Won | |
| 2006 | Daytime Emmy Award | Outstanding Younger Actor in a Drama Series | General Hospital | Nominated | |
| 2010 | Daytime Emmy Award | Outstanding Younger Actor in a Drama Series | One Life to Live | Nominated | |
| 2011 | Daytime Emmy Award | Outstanding Younger Actor in a Drama Series | The Bold and the Beautiful | Won | |
| 2013 | Daytime Emmy Award | Outstanding Supporting Actor in a Drama Series | The Bold and the Beautiful | Won | |
| 2014 | Daytime Emmy Award | Outstanding Supporting Actor in a Drama Series | The Bold and the Beautiful | Nominated | |
| 2015 | Daytime Emmy Award | Outstanding Supporting Actor in a Drama Series | The Bold and the Beautiful | Nominated | |
| 2016 | Soap Awards France | Best Couple of the Year — "Hope and Liam" (shared with Kim Matula) | The Bold and the Beautiful | Nominated | |
| 2017 | Daytime Emmy Award | Outstanding Lead Actor in a Drama Series | The Bold and the Beautiful | Won | |
| 2018 | Soap Awards France | Best Actor of the Year | The Bold and the Beautiful | Nominated | |
| 2019 | Soap Awards France | Best International Actor / Actress | The Bold and the Beautiful | Nominated | |
| 2020 | Soap Hub Awards | Favorite The Bold and the Beautiful Actor | The Bold and the Beautiful | Nominated | |
| 2021 | Soap Awards France | Best International Actor | The Bold and the Beautiful | Won | |
| 2024 | Daytime Emmy Award | Outstanding Lead Actor in a Drama Series | The Bold and the Beautiful | Nominated | |
| 2026 | Daytime Emmy Award | Outstanding Lead Actor in a Drama Series | The Bold and the Beautiful | Won | |

== See also ==
- List of atheists in film, radio, television and theater
- List of Daytime Emmy Award winners
- List of General Hospital cast members
- List of One Life to Live cast members
- List of The Bold and the Beautiful cast members
- List of YouTube personalities
- Criticism of religion
- New Atheism
- Social impact of YouTube
