= Jack Snyder and Carly Tenney =

Jack Snyder and Carly Tenney (Michael Park and Maura West)

Jack Snyder and Carly Tenney Snyder are a fictional supercouple from the American daytime drama As the World Turns. Michael Park portrays Jack, while Maura West portrays Carly. They are often referred to using the portmanteau "CarJack" (for Carly and Jack) on internet message boards.

== Storyline ==
- Jack and Carly met in Carly's native state Montana. After breaking up with Carly, Jack met Julia Lindsey. While helping Julia escape from her controlling fiancé, he developed feelings for her. During this time Jack also discovered that Carly have married Hal, to gain a trust fund from her estranged half sister, Rosanna Cabot. Hal eventually discovered the truth on his own and divorced Carly.
- Carly married Jack's brother, Brad, though she did not love him. Brad blackmailed Carly by threatening to tell that Parker was really Hal's son, and not John Dixon's. Carly's cousin Molly switched the paternity results so that Carly could obtain the trust fund. Chemistry between Jack and Carly remained strong. Jack's relationship with Julia ended due to dishonesty and interference from Carly.
- Carly lost everything, including custody of her son. Jack took pity on her and befriended her, despite all that had happened. Jack wanted to attempt a romantic relationship with Carly again, but stipulated that there could be no more lies between them. He made a bet with her that she could not go three months without lying. When she won the bet, he took her to a section of land that he had purchased for them to build their dream home on, and proposed. They named the land Carly's Prize.
- In 2001, Julia miscarried Jack's baby and Jack confessed that he still loved Carly. Jack tried to be faithful, but was drawn to Carly and created excuses to meet with her. Jack's feelings for Carly drove Julia insane, and eventually led her to kill Carly's horse, Flashdance. Jack became concerned about Julia's mental state and eventually uncovered the truth about the horse. He urged Julia to check herself into an institution and hid her crimes, blaming himself for her mental state. Jack would not commit to Carly due to his guilt over being responsible for Julia's state of mind.
- Carly mysteriously disappeared along with Emily Stewart and Rose D'Angelo. The three had been kidnapped by evil mastermind, James Stenbeck and held hostage at a spa. Jack pursued false leads for months and was even stopped from leaving the country by Julia (hired by James) who kidnapped, tortured and raped Jack until Craig and Simon caught on to what was going on. Julia got away but they saved Jack. Jack finally made a deal with James. The deal was that James would let Carly go in exchange for his ex-wife Barbara Ryan. Carly was released, Barbara was able to get away and James fled from the law. Jack saved Carly once again. But, due to skin treatments at the spa, Carly looked decades older. Not wanting her to deal with everyone's reaction, Jack had her secretly transferred to Memorial hospital. Jack loved Carly from the inside and her look did not affect him. The same could not be said for Craig who turned to Rosanna after he saw what had become of Carly. Eventually, Carly was released from the hospital and went to live with Parker and Jack's house. Carly felt Jack's unconditional love.
- Meanwhile, tragedy struck when Rosanna was run off the road by Craig and fell into a coma. At the time of the accident, Rosanna had made plans to adopt a baby boy from a teenage unwed mother. With Rosanna incapacitated, Carly decided to raise her sister's baby, whom she named Rory, after Rosanna. Unfortunately, the mother, Gwen Norbeck, decided to sue the Snyders for custody since she didn't know or trust Carly. A week later, at the trial, Iris told Carly the secret she had been hiding. She had given birth to Carly's father, Ray Tenney's, child and Carly, in a childhood pique of jealousy, murdered her newborn baby. Since Carly was underage, the records were sealed. When Carly relayed the story to Jack, he was forced to admit that he'd not only seen the juvenile records; he'd destroyed them. As for Carly, all she remembered was a small baby and Iris screaming that she'd killed him. In the meantime, the custody battle seemed to be turning in Gwen's favor with her getting visitation rights.
- Carly then moved on to a flirtatious relationship with new business partner, Simon Frasier.

== Impact ==
Jack and Carly were nominated as the "Most Irresistible Combination" at the 32nd Daytime Emmy Awards.

On June 27, 2010, Maura West and Michael Park (Carly and Jack) respectively both won Daytime Emmy Awards for Outstanding Lead Actress (West's second) and Outstanding Lead Actor (Park's first).

On June 18, 2011, Michael Park won his second Daytime Emmy Award for Outstanding Lead Actor.

== See also ==
- List of supercouples
