= Michael Park (actor) =

American actor (b. 1968)

- Born: Michael Frank Park; July 20, 1968 (age 58); Canandaigua, New York, U.S.
- Education: Nazareth College
- Occupation: Actor
- Years active: 1992–present
- Spouse: Laurie Nowak (m. 1996)
- Children: 3

Michael Frank Park (born July 20, 1968) is an American actor, best known for his roles as Jack Snyder on As the World Turns (1997– 2010), Larry Murphy in the original Broadway cast of Dear Evan Hansen (2016), and reporter Tom Holloway in the third season of the Netflix series Stranger Things (2019).

Park won back-to-back (2010, 2011) Daytime Emmy Awards for Outstanding Lead Actor in a Drama Series. In 2018, for his work in Dear Evan Hansen, Park won the Grammy Award for Best Musical Theater Album and the Daytime Emmy Award for Outstanding Musical Performance in a Daytime Program.

== Early life ==
Park was born in Canandaigua, New York, but spent a year of his childhood in Pittsburgh, Pennsylvania.

== Career ==
Park attended Nazareth College, Rochester, New York, originally intending to become an architect, before deciding to become an actor. He worked in the 1992 New Plays Festival at Geva Theatre in Rochester. He appeared in regional productions including Ellen Universe Joins The Band and Peephole.

In 1994, Park appeared in the musical Hello Again at Lincoln Center Theater. In August 1994, Park was in the Goodspeed Opera House production of Shenandoah, and Good News at the North Shore Music Theatre (1994). After understudying Billy Bigelow in the 1994 revival of Rodgers and Hammerstein's Carousel, he made his Broadway debut in 1995 in Smokey Joe's Cafe. In 1997, Park played Monty in the Playwrights Horizons production of Violet.

The day after Violet opened was Park's first day in the long-running daytime soap opera As the World Turns as Jack Snyder, joining in April 1997. Park received three Emmy nominations and several other soap-opera acting awards, including winning the 2010 and 2011 Daytime Emmy Awards for Outstanding Lead Actor in a Drama Series.

During his 13-year tenure in As the World Turns, he continued to work in theatre, playing Lucky Malone in the Roundabout Theatre Company's revival of Little Me (1998). He made two New York City Center Encores! appearances: Bloomer Girl in 2001 as Jeff Calhoun, and Applause in 2008 as Bill Sampson.

With As the World Turns coming to an end in June 2010, Park returned to the stage, and played the role of Pete's ghost father who appeared to his son as three "Alamo" characters in the coming-of-age musical The Burnt Part Boys at Playwrights Horizon. In the summer of 2010, he appeared as Lord Capulet in the musical The Last Goodbye at Williamstown Theatre Festival. Park then appeared as the cop in Will Eno's play Middletown at the off-Broadway Vineyard Theatre (2010).

Park performed in the role of Bert Bratt in the Broadway revival How to Succeed in Business Without Really Trying (2011), starring Daniel Radcliffe and John Larroquette.

In the 2012 independent financial thriller film Supercapitalist, Park appears as Morris Brown, co-starring along with Linus Roache.

On December 5, 2013, he participated as a cast member of the NBC telecast production of The Sound of Music Live! starring Carrie Underwood. He played Cecco, one of Captain Hook's pirates, in the NBC presentation of Peter Pan Live! starring Allison Williams and Christopher Walken; the musical was broadcast on December 4, 2014.

Park has appeared in episodes of numerous television series, including The Good Wife (2012), The Blacklist (2016), You (2018, two episodes), Blue Bloods (2018), and FBI (2021).

In 2015, he originated the role of Larry Murphy in the world premiere of the stage musical Dear Evan Hansen at Washington, DC's Arena Stage. He was not in the off-Broadway run, starting in early 2016, as he was appearing in the Broadway musical, Tuck Everlasting. He returned to Dear Evan Hansen in the fall of 2016 when the musical made its debut on Broadway. For his work in Dear Evan Hansen, Michael Park earned the 2018 Grammy Award for Best Musical Theater Album and his third Daytime Emmy Award, this one a Daytime Creative Arts Emmy Award for Outstanding Musical Performance in a Daytime Program for his and the rest of the cast's Today Show performance that was broadcast on April 25, 2017.

In 2022, Park played Philip Abshire in the HBO series The Time Traveler's Wife.

== Personal life ==
Park has been married to music therapist Laurie Nowak since January 6, 1996. They have three children.

== Stage credits ==
Year(s)	Production	Role	Notes
1993-1994	Hello Again	The College Boy	Mitzi E. Newhouse Theater, Broadway
1994	Shenandoah	James Anderson	Goodspeed Opera House
1994-1995	Carousel	Billy Bigelow (standby)	Vivian Beaumont Theatre, Broadway
1995-1997	Smokey Joe's Cafe	Performer	August Wilson Theatre, Broadway
1997	Violet	Monty	Playwrights Horizons, Off-Broadway
1998-1999	Little Me	Lucky	Roundabout Theatre Company
2001	Bloomer Girl	Jeff Calhoun	New York City Center, Encores!
2008	Applause	Bill Sampson	New York City Center, Encores!
2010	Middletown	Cop	Vineyard Theatre, Off-Broadway
2011-2012	How to Succeed in Business Without Really Trying	Bert Bratt	Al Hirschfeld Theatre, Broadway
2012-2013	Cat on a Hot Tin Roof	Gooper	Richard Rodgers Theatre, Broadway
2013	The Cradle Will Rock	Trixie / Bugs / Dick	New York City Center, Encores!
2014	The Threepenny Opera	Macheath	Atlantic Theater Company, Off-Broadway
2015	Tuck Everlasting	Angus Tuck	Alliance Theatre
2015	Dear Evan Hansen	Larry Murphy	Arena Stage
2016	Tuck Everlasting	Angus Tuck	Broadhurst Theatre, Broadway
2016	Ragtime	Father	Ellis Island Concert
2016-2019	Dear Evan Hansen	Larry Murphy	Music Box Theatre, Broadway
2017	Jagged Little Pill	Steve Healy	Workshop
2018	My One and Only	Prince Nicolai Erraclyovitch Tchatchavadze	Stephen Sondheim Theatre, Broadway Concert
2019	Footloose	Reverend Shaw Moore	Kennedy Center
2020	Next to Normal	Dr. Madden / Dr. Fine	Kennedy Center
2024	Redwood	Finn	La Jolla Playhouse
2025	Redwood	Finn	Nederlander Theatre, Broadway
2026	The Recipe	McWilliams	La Jolla Playhouse
2026	Newsies	Joseph Pulitzer	The Muny
2026	Galileo	Galileo Galilei (alternate)	Shubert Theatre, Broadway

== See also ==
- Jack Snyder and Carly Tenney
