= Robert S. Woods =

American actor

- Born: Robert Sosebee Woods; March 13, 1948 (age 78); Maywood, California, US
- Occupation: Actor
- Years active: 1976–present
- Spouse: Loyita Chapel (1985–present)
- Children: 2 (1 deceased)

Robert Sosebee Woods (born March 13, 1948) is an American actor best known for playing Bo Buchanan on the ABC soap One Life to Live, a role for which he won the 1983 Daytime Emmy Award for Outstanding Lead Actor in a Drama Series.

== Early life ==
In 1966 Woods graduated from Lakewood High School in Lakewood, California, where he served as senior class president, and a cheerleader. He later joined the U.S. Armed Forces and fought in the Vietnam War. Woods ultimately graduated from California State University, Long Beach where he was a member of the Sigma Alpha Epsilon fraternity.

== Career ==
Woods began portraying Bo Buchanan – a Vietnam War veteran – on the ABC soap One Life to Live in 1979, winning the Daytime Emmy Award for Outstanding Lead Actor in a Drama Series in 1983. He left the series in 1986 and returned 1988, and continued the role until the series cancellation in 2012. Woods also earned Daytime Emmy nominations in 1986, 1993, 1994, 1999, and 2000, multiple Soap Opera Digest Award nominations, and four MVP trophies from Soap Opera Update.

Woods has also appeared on television series such as Roseanne and the NBC soap opera Days of Our Lives. He appeared in eight episodes of The Waltons, four credited as "Robert Merritt Woods" and four as "Christopher Woods."

Woods is also the voiceover in the animated TV spot for JPMorgan Chase & Co. which debuted in October 2010.

== Filmography ==
=== Film ===
| Year | Title | Role | Notes |
|---|---|---|---|
| 1978 | Big Wednesday | Lifeguard (as Christopher Woods) | Feature film |
| 1978 | Repairs | Peter | Short film |
| 1979 | The China Syndrome | Uncredited role | Feature film |

=== Television ===
| Year | Title | Role | Notes |
|---|---|---|---|
| 1976 | City of Angels | Young man at car (uncredited) | Episode: "Match Point" |
| 1976 | The Waltons | Dr. David Spencer (credited as Robert Merritt Woods) | Episode: "The Vigil"; Episode" "The Fire storm" Episode: "The Wedding: Part 1"; Episode: "The Wedding: Part 2" |
| 1977 | Family | Steve ccredited as Chrisopher Woods) | Episode: "Acts of Love: Part 1" |
| 1977 | Just a Little Inconvenience | First Sergeant (credited as Christopher Woods) | Television movie (NBC) |
| 1977 | The Night They Took Miss Beautiful | Uncredited role | Television movie (NBC) |
| 1978–1979 | Project U.F.O. | Captain William Coleman (credited as Christopher Woods) | Episode: "Sighting 4001: The Washington D.C. Incident" (1978) |
| 1978–1979 | Project U.F.O. | First Lt. Bob King - Co-Pilot (as Christopher Woods) | Episode: "Sighting 4003: The Fremont Incident" (1978) |
| 1978–1979 | Project U.F.O. | Lt. Carmichael (as Christopher Woods) | Episode: "Sighting 4007: The Forest City Incident" (1978) |
| 1978–1979 | Project U.F.O. | Tom Pederson (as Christopher Woods) | Episode: "Sighting 4025: The Whitman Tower Incident" (1979) |
| 1978–1979 | The Waltons | Dr. David Spencer (credited as Christopher Woods) | Episode: "The Anniversary" (1978); Episode: "The Obsession" (1979); Episode: "The Pin-Up" (1979); Episode: "The Attack" (1979) |
| 1979–1986, 1988–2012 (shown on ABC) 2013 (revival shown on Hulu Channel) | One Life to Live | Beaufort "Bo" Oglethorpe Buchanan | Daytime serial @ ABC (contract role @ 765 episodes); Daytime serial @ Hulu (contract role @ 40 episodes) For Daytime Emmy info, see Awards and nominations section below for details |
| 1982 | Fantasies | Clint McDougall | Television movie (ABC) |
| 1985 | Chase | Sheriff Dean Hartley | Television movie (CBS) |
| 1986 | Newhart | Hal Foster | Episode: "High Fidelity" |
| 1986–1987 | Days of Our Lives | Paul Stewart | Daytime serial (contract role @ 54 episodes) |
| 1987 | CBS Summer Playhouse | Skip | Episode: "Changing Patterns" (unsold TV pilot) |
| 1987 | Carly's Web | Donald Stevens | Television movie (NBC) |
| 1988 | War and Remembrance | Lt. Cmdr. Eugene Lindsey (Enterprise) | Television miniseries (12-part on ABC); he only appeared in Episodes I & III |
| 1992 | Swamp Thing | Ryson | Episode: "Pay Day" |
| 1994 | Roseanne | Beaufort "Bo" Oglethorpe Buchanan | Episode: "Isn't It Romantic?" |
| 1995 | Deadly Love | Jim King | Television movie (Lifetime Television) |
| 2005 | All My Children | Beaufort "Bo" Oglethorpe Buchanan | Episode: #9018, #9027 & #9029 (guest role) |
| 2013 | The Grove | Unknown character | Television movie (unsold pilot for web series) |

== Awards and nominations ==
| Year | Award | Category | Work | Result |
|---|---|---|---|---|
| 1983 | Daytime Emmy Award | Outstanding Lead Actor in a Drama Series | One Life to Live | Won |
| 1986 | Daytime Emmy Award | Outstanding Lead Actor in a Drama Series | One Life to Live | Nominated |
| 1993 | Daytime Emmy Award | Outstanding Lead Actor in a Drama Series | One Life to Live | Nominated |
| 1994 | Daytime Emmy Award | Outstanding Lead Actor in a Drama Series | One Life to Live | Nominated |
| 1999 | Daytime Emmy Award | Outstanding Lead Actor in a Drama Series | One Life to Live | Nominated |
| 2000 | Daytime Emmy Award | Outstanding Lead Actor in a Drama Series | One Life to Live | Nominated |
| 2012 | Daytime Emmy Award | Outstanding Lead Actor in a Drama Series | One Life to Live | Nominated |

== Personal life ==
Woods is married to actress Loyita Chapel and lives in New York. The couple have a son, Tanner Woods, who played a young Bo on One Life to Live in an August 26, 2008 flashback to 1968. Tanner was a twin, whose sibling died at the age of one month.

Woods was good friends with on-screen father Phil Carey.
