= Daytime Emmy Award for Outstanding Lead Actor in a Drama Series =

Daytime drama award

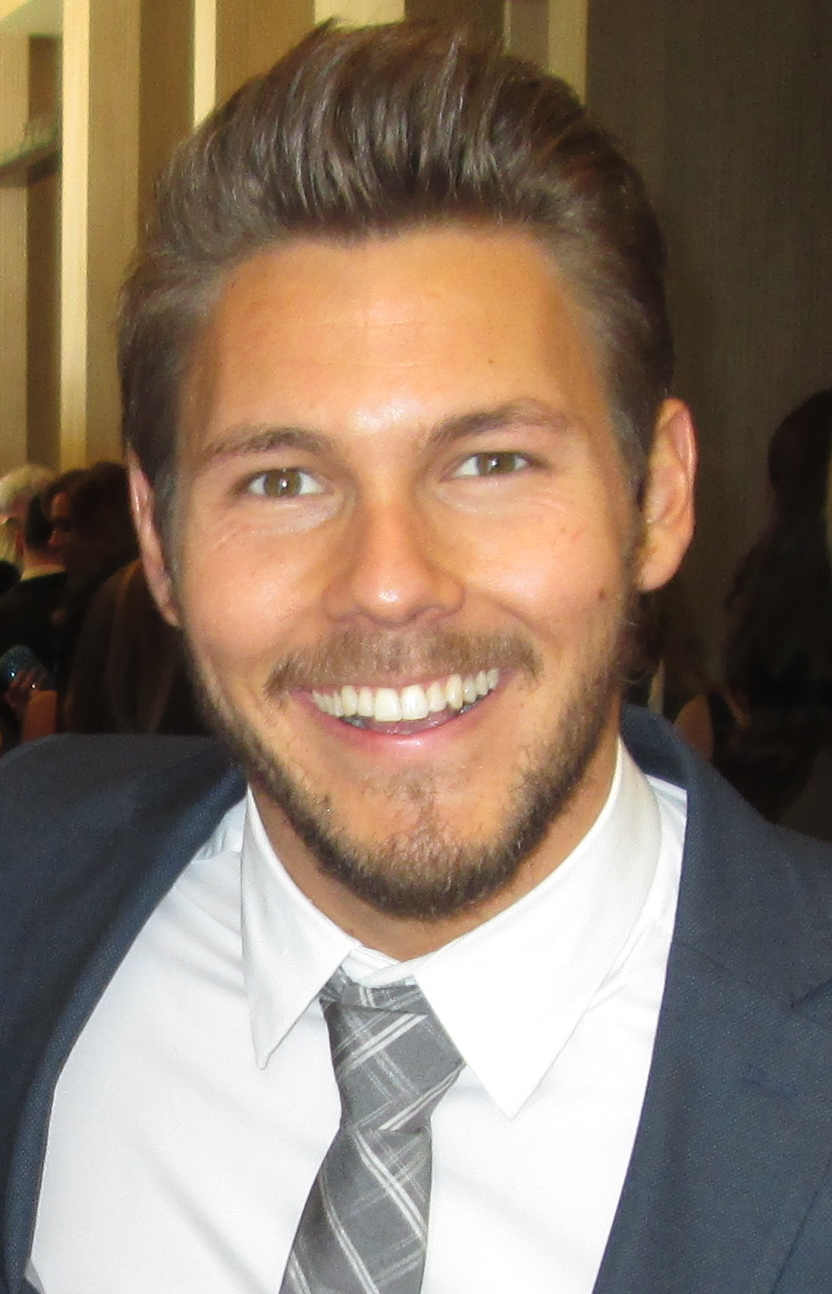
- The 2026 recipient: Scott Clifton
- Awarded for: Outstanding Lead Performance in a Daytime Drama Series: Actor
- Country: United States
- Presented by: NATAS; ATAS
- First award: 1974
- Currently held by: Scott Clifton, The Bold and the Beautiful (2026)

Highlights
- Most awards: Anthony Geary, (8)
- Most nominations: Peter Bergman, (25)
- Website: theemmys.tv/daytime/

The Daytime Emmy Award for Outstanding Lead Actor in a Drama Series is an award presented annually by the National Academy of Television Arts and Sciences (NATAS) and Academy of Television Arts & Sciences (ATAS). It is given in honor of an actor who has delivered an outstanding performance in a leading role while working within the daytime drama industry.

The 1st Daytime Emmy Awards ceremony was held in 1974 with Macdonald Carey receiving the award for his portrayal of Tom Horton on Days of Our Lives. The award has undergone several name changes, originally honoring actors in leading and supporting roles. Following the introduction of a new category in 1979, Outstanding Supporting Actor in a Drama Series, the award's name was altered to Outstanding Actor in a Drama Series before changing once again, to its current title, years later. The awards ceremony was not aired on television in 1983 and 1984, having been criticized for lack of integrity. In 1985, another category was introduced, Outstanding Younger Actor in a Drama Series, one criterion for this category was altered, requiring all actors to be age 26 or younger.

Since its inception, the award has been given to 29 actors. General Hospital has the most awarded actors in this category with a total of twelve wins. In 1979, Al Freeman, Jr. became the first African-American to have garnered the award, winning for his role as Ed Hall on One Life to Live. In 2008, Anthony Geary became the actor with the most wins in the category when he won for a sixth time, surpassing David Canary's previous record. Geary went on to win again in 2012 and 2015, thus far winning on eight occasions. Peter Bergman has been nominated on 25 occasions, more than any other actor. As of the 2026 ceremony, Scott Clifton, is the most recent winner in this category for his portrayal of Liam Spencer on The Bold and the Beautiful.

== Winners and nominees ==
Listed below are the winners of the award for each year, as well as the other nominees.

Table key
‡	Indicates the winner

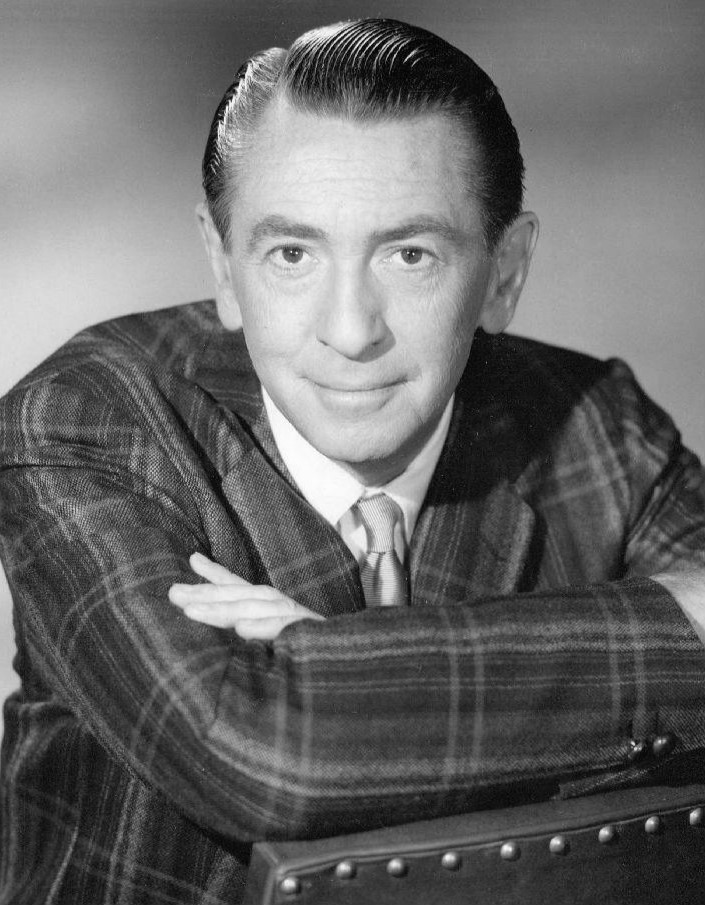
Macdonald Carey won two from three nominations for his role as Tom Horton on Days of Our Lives.

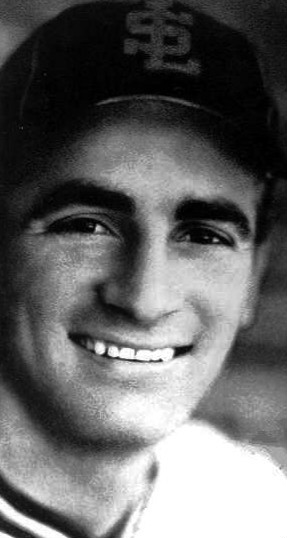
John Beradino was nominated three times for his role as Steve Hardy on General Hospital.

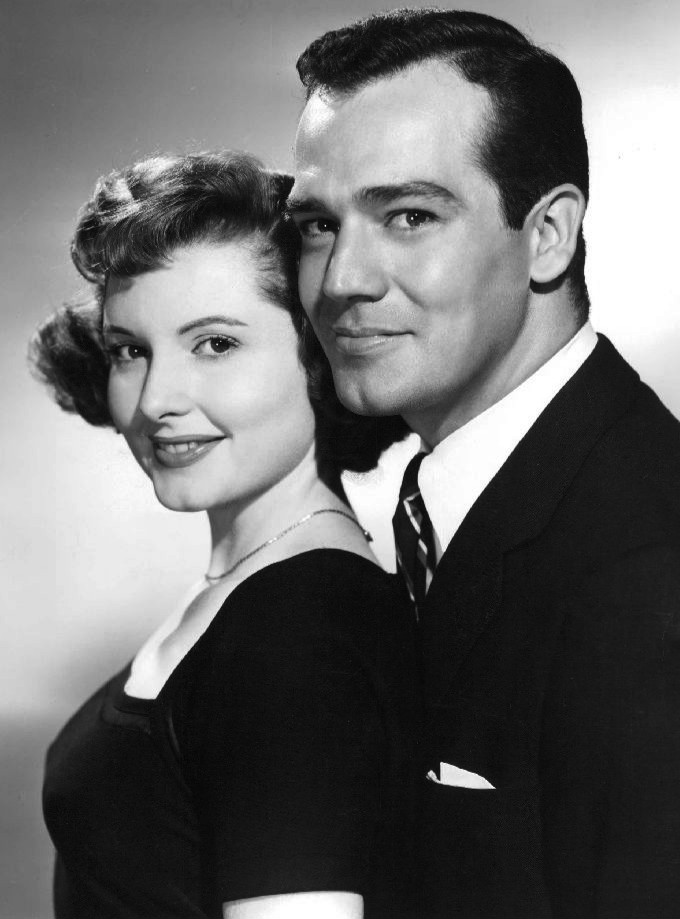
Val Dufour won in 1977 for his role as John Wyatt on Search for Tomorrow.

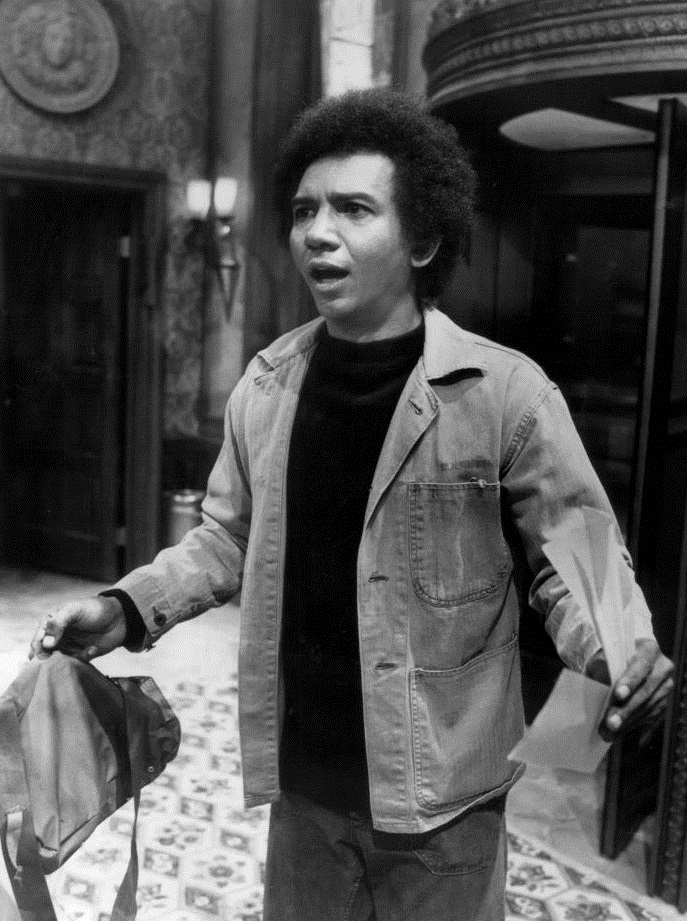
Al Freeman, Jr. won in 1979 for his role as Ed Hall on One Life to Live.

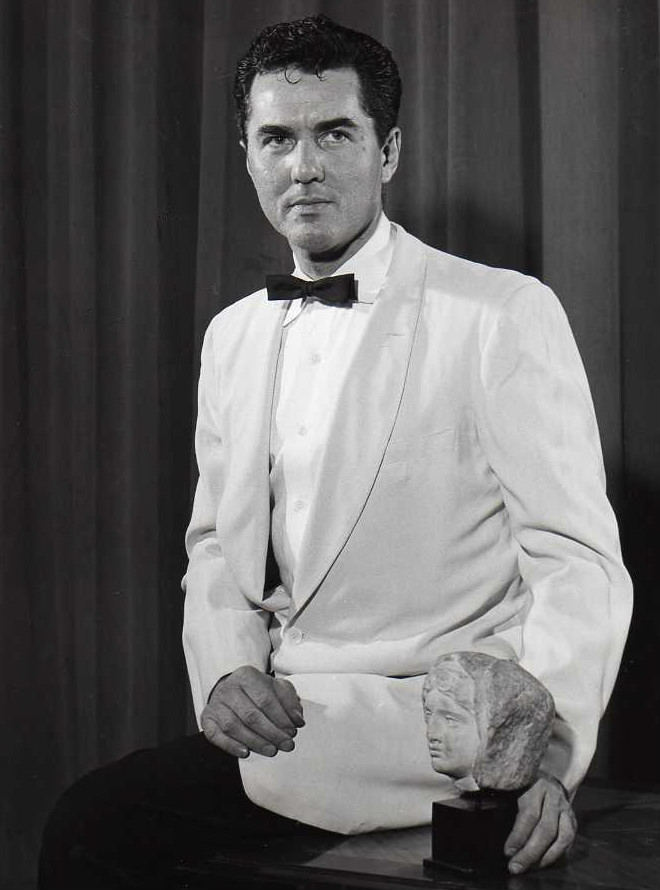
Douglass Watson received two consecutive wins for his role as Mac Cory in 1980 and 1981 on Another World.

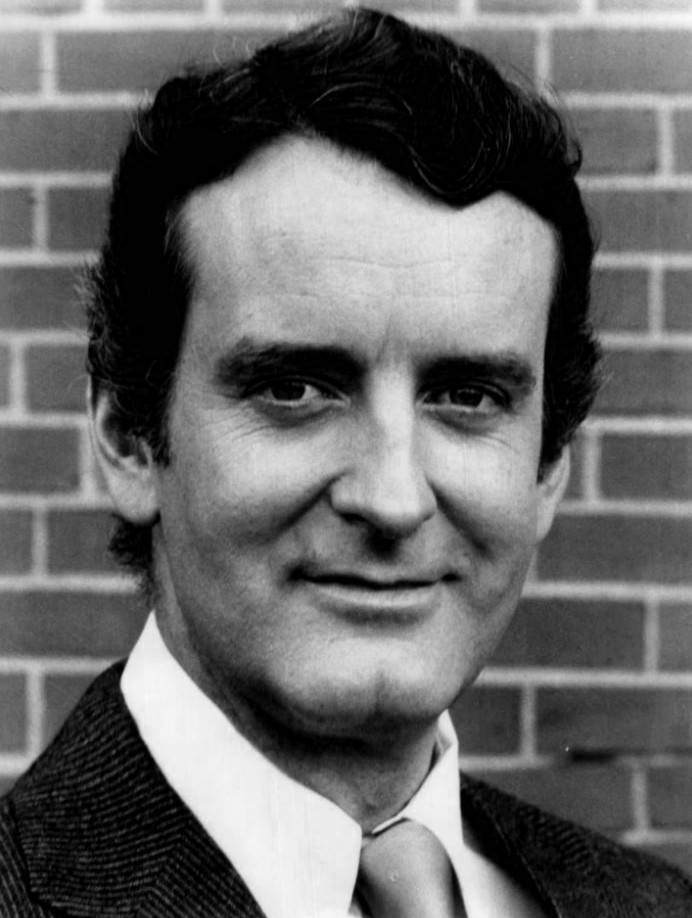
Nicolas Coster was nominated three times for his role as Lionel Lockridge on Santa Barbara.

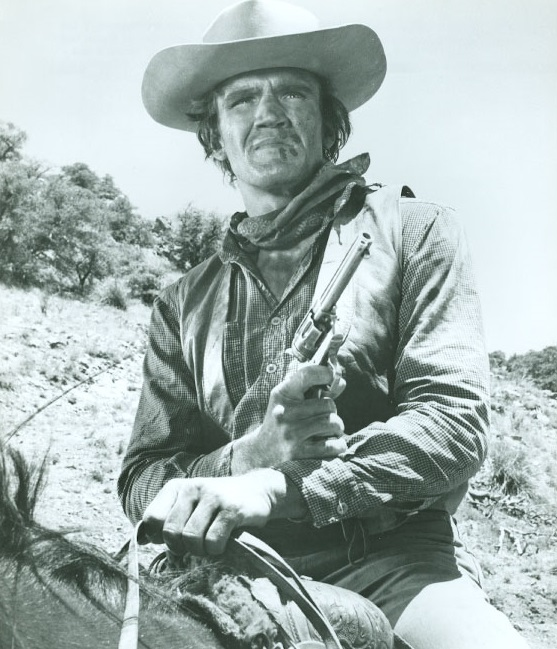
David Canary was nominated 16 times and won five times for his work on All My Children.

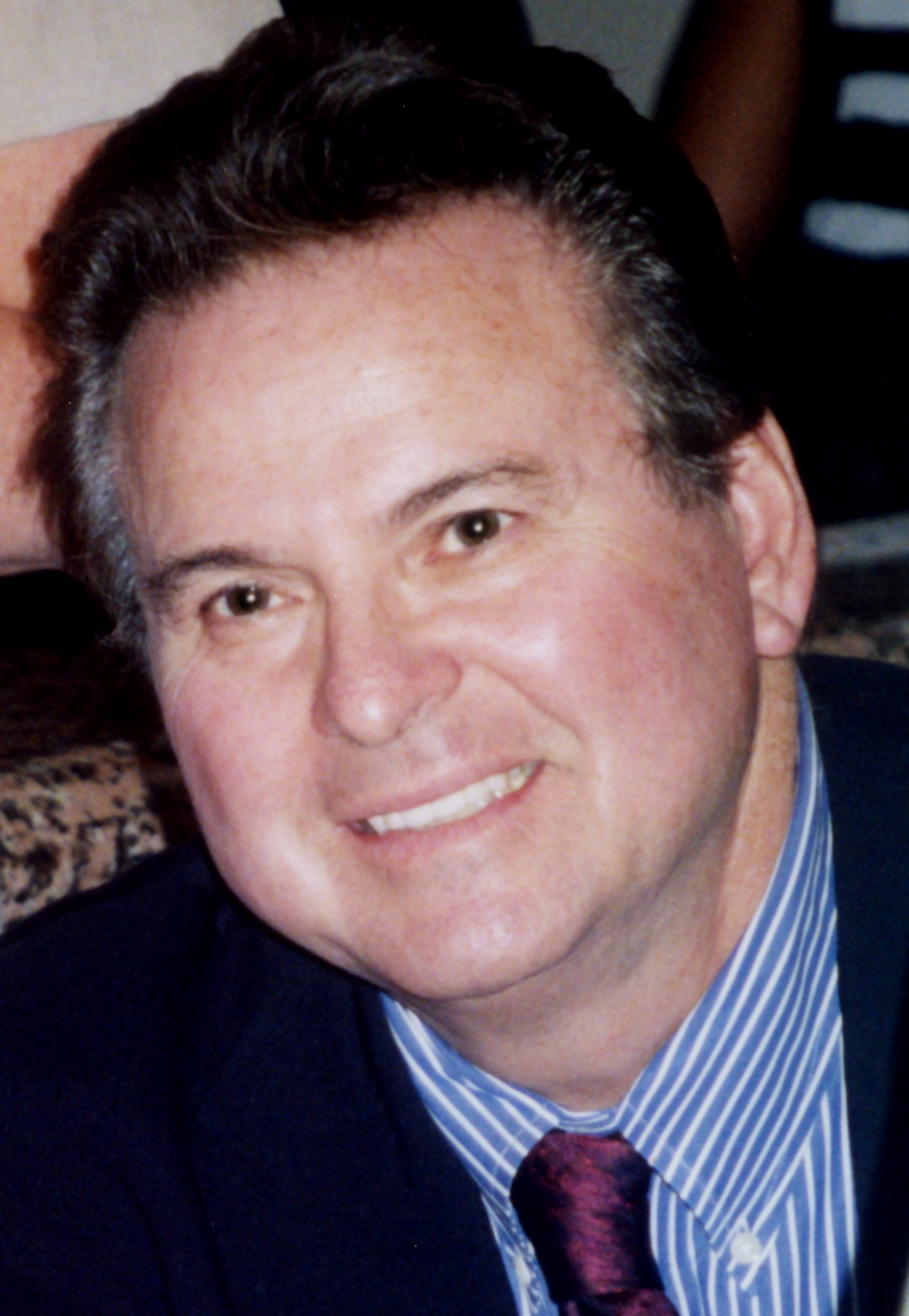
Stuart Damon was nominated three times for his role as Alan Quartermaine on General Hospital.

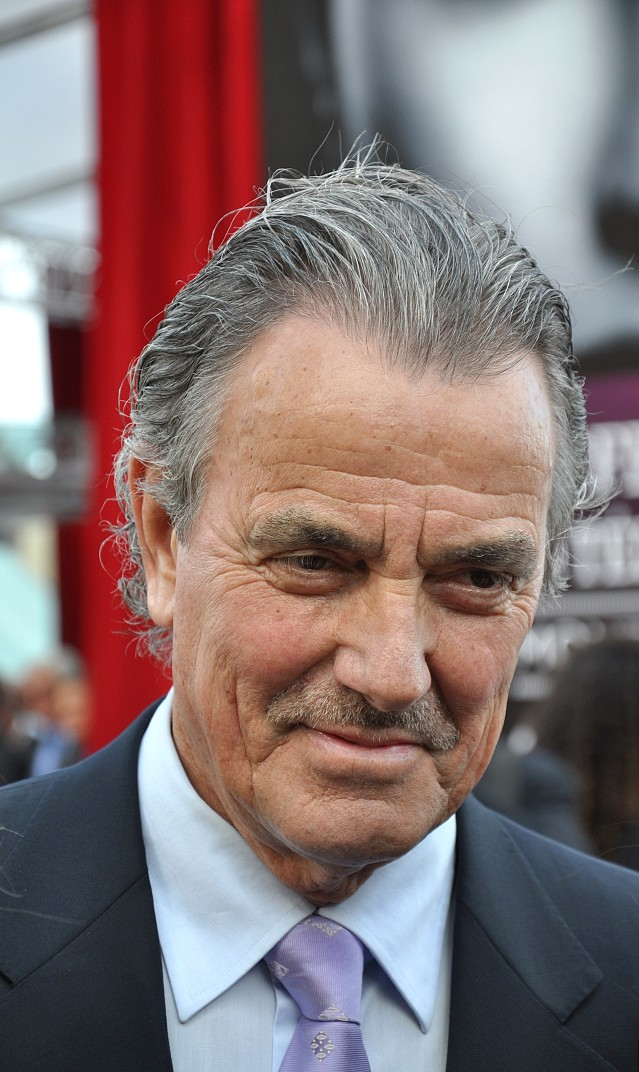
Eric Braeden was nominated eight times, winning once in 1998 for his role as Victor Newman on The Young and the Restless.

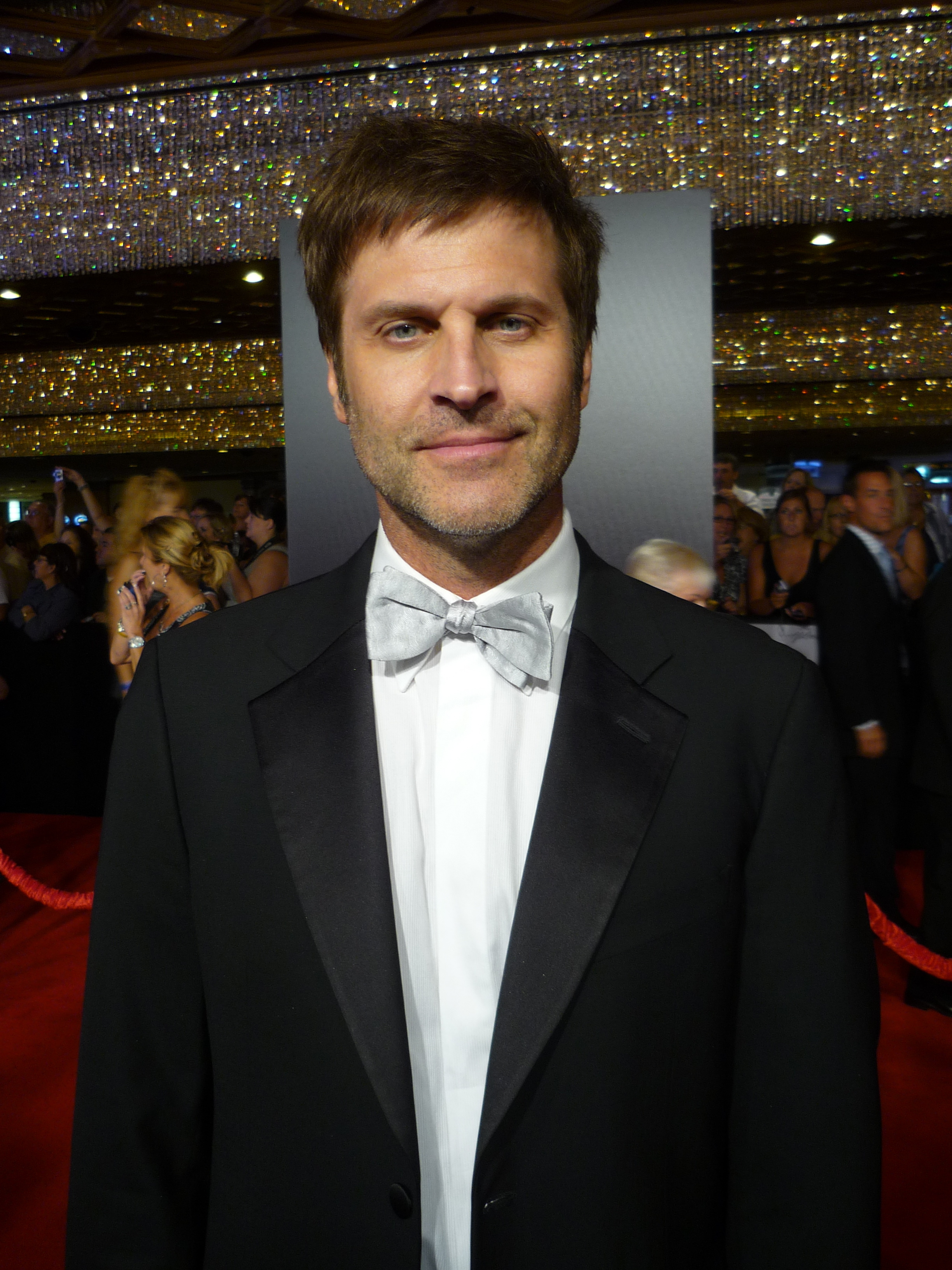
Jon Hensley was nominated in 2001 for his role as Holden Snyder on As the World Turns.

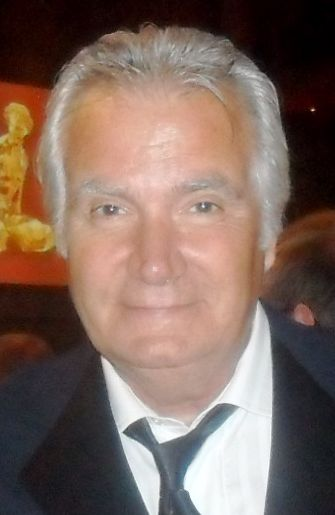
John McCook has been nominated four times (2001, 2012, 2018, 2022) for his role as Eric Forrester on The Bold and the Beautiful.

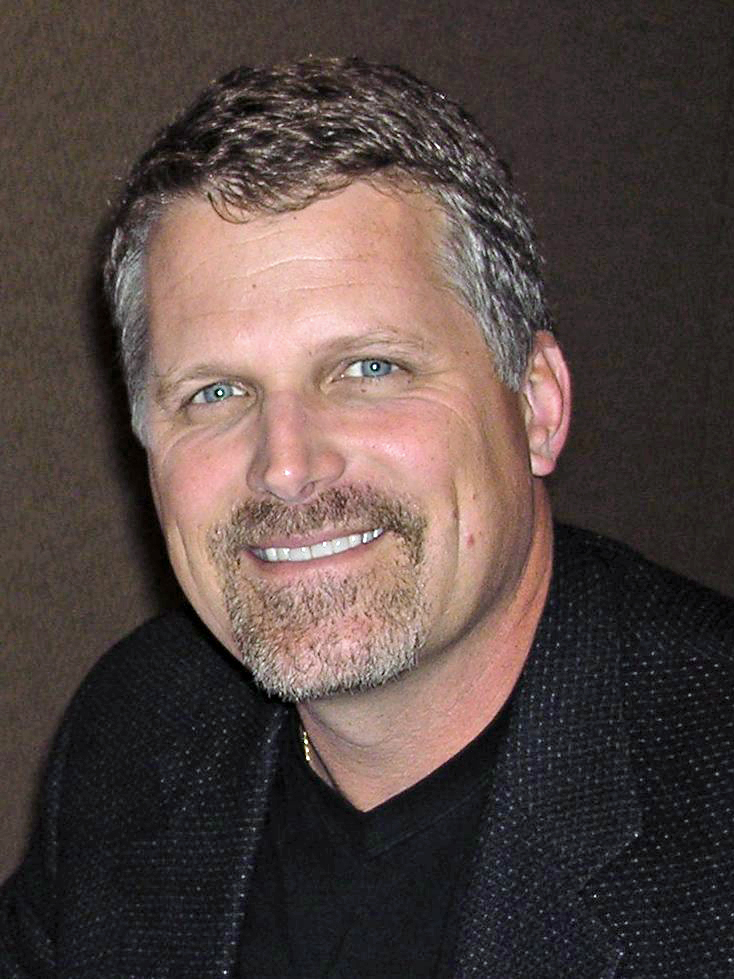
Robert Newman has been nominated twice for his role as Joshua Lewis on Guiding Light.

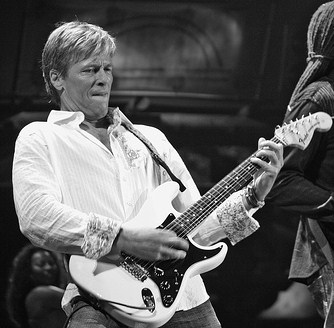
Jack Wagner was nominated in 2005 for his role as Nick Marone on The Bold and the Beautiful.

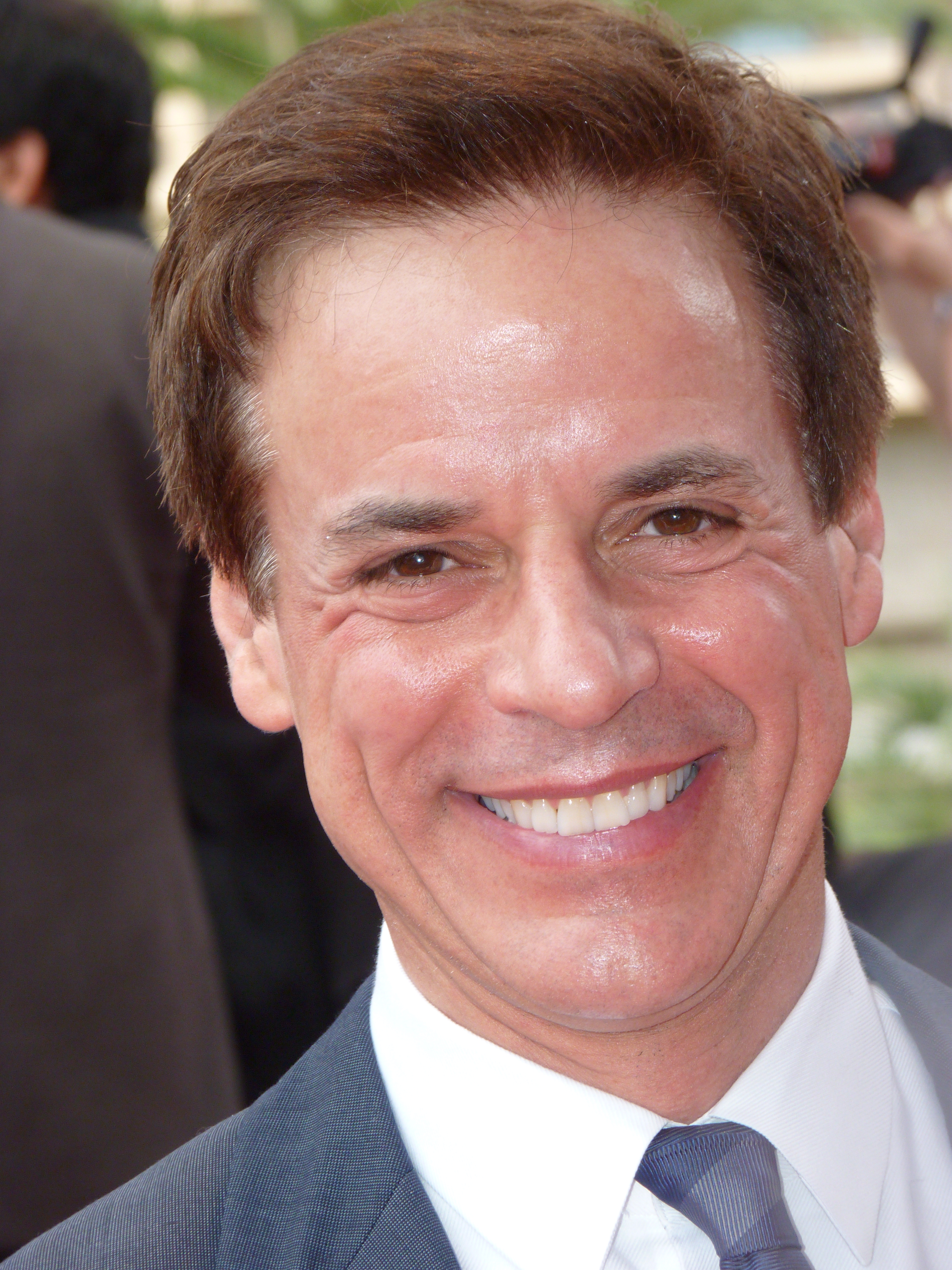
Christian LeBlanc won three (2005, 2007, and 2009) from seven nominations for his role as Michael Baldwin on The Young and the Restless.

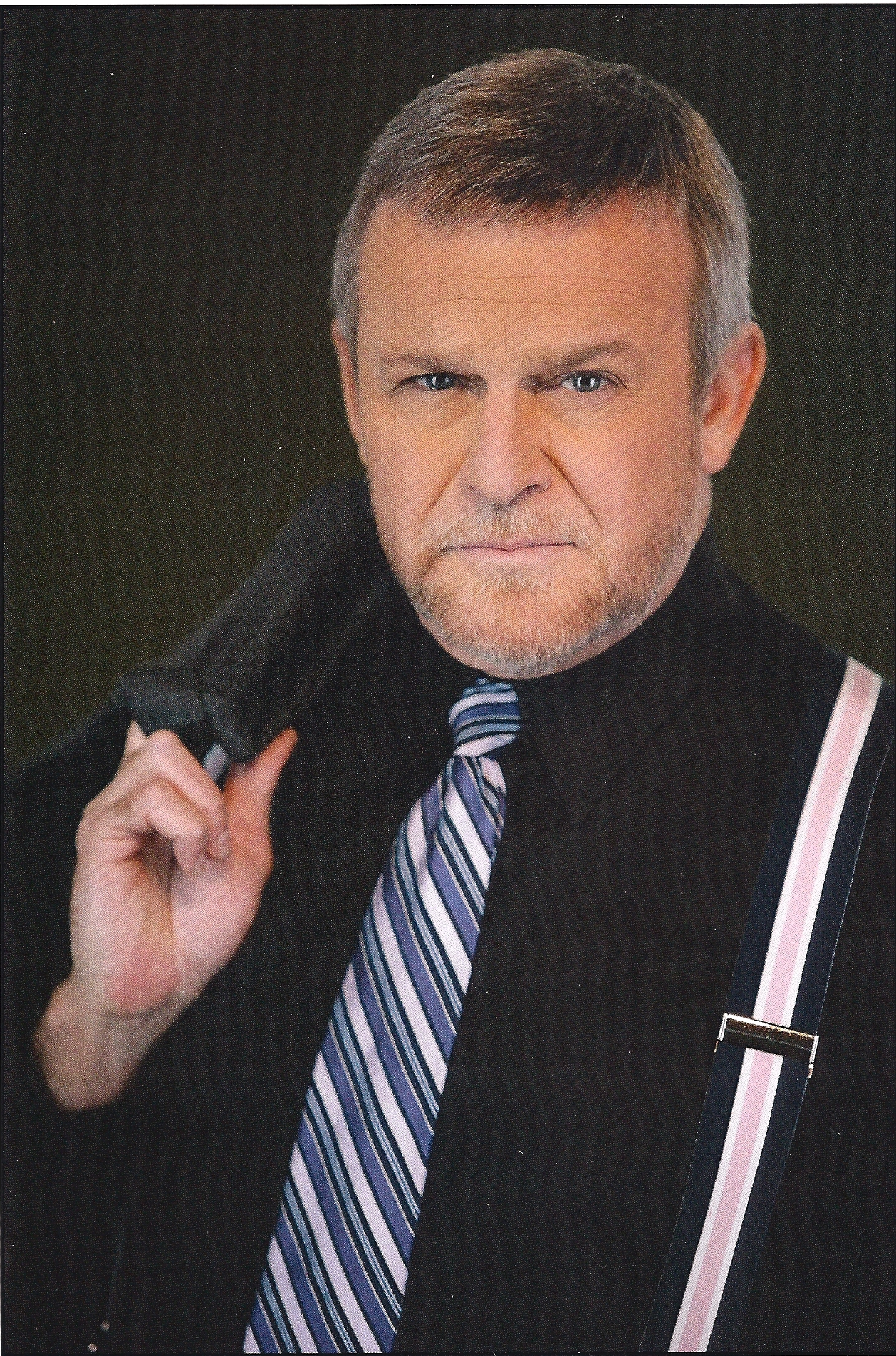
Ron Raines was nominated in 2006 for his role as Alan Spaulding on Guiding Light.

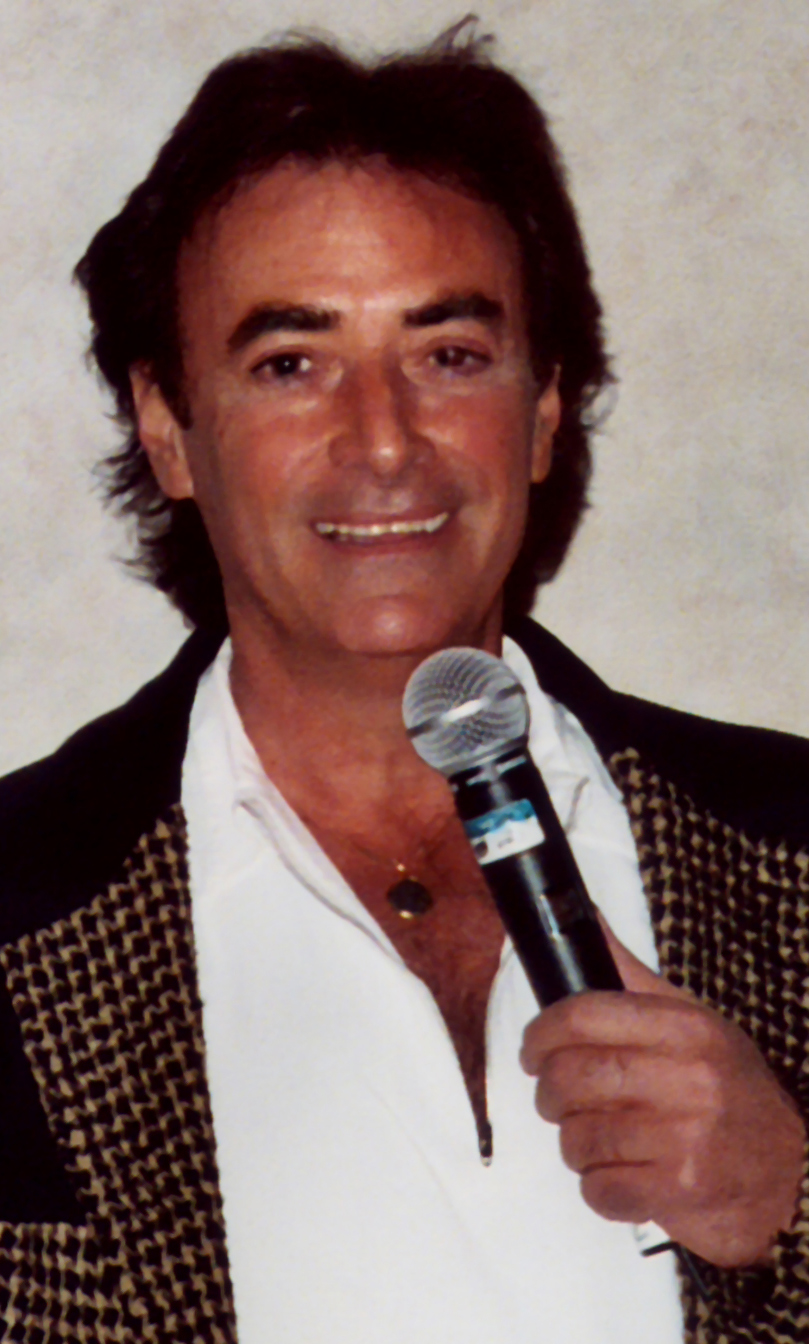
Thaao Penghlis received two nominations (2008 and 2020) for his work on Days of Our Lives.

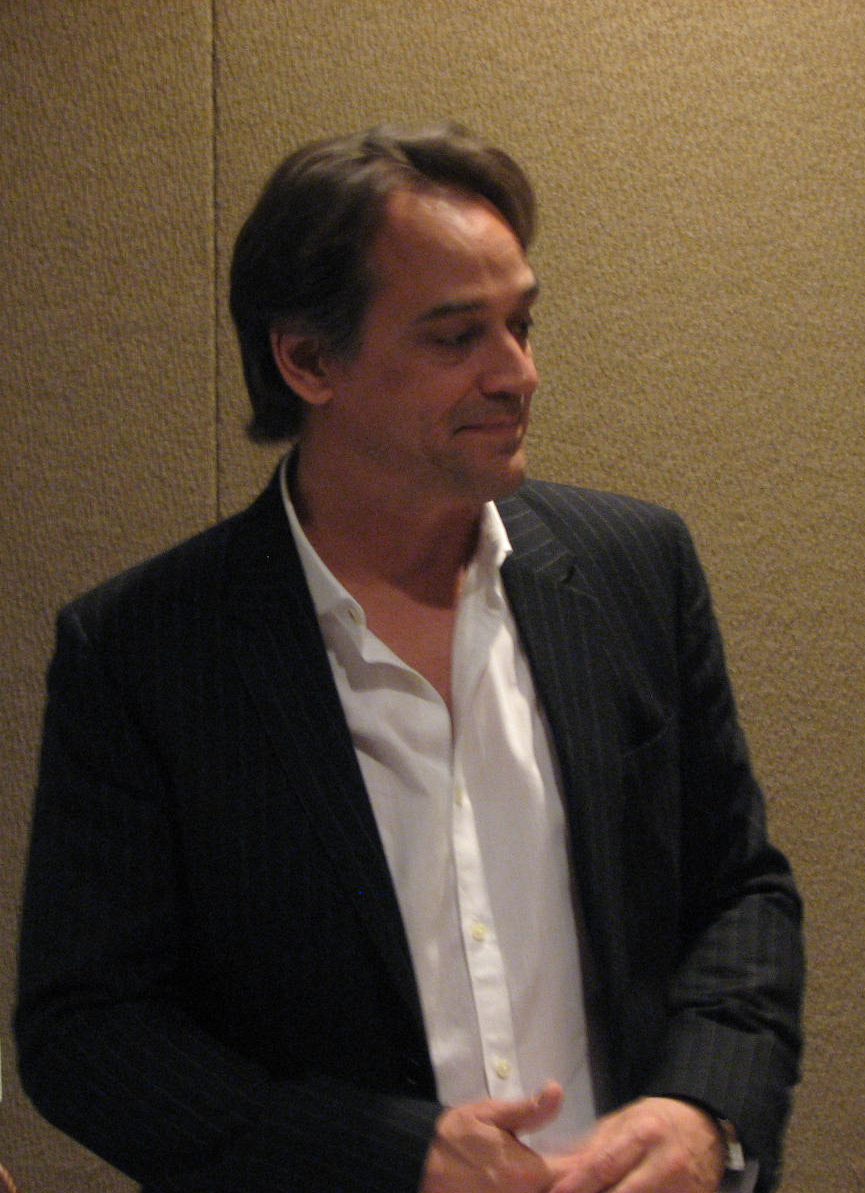
Jon Lindstrom was nominated once for his role as Craig Montgomery on As the World Turns (2011) and twice for playing dual roles on General Hospital, in 2019 and 2020.

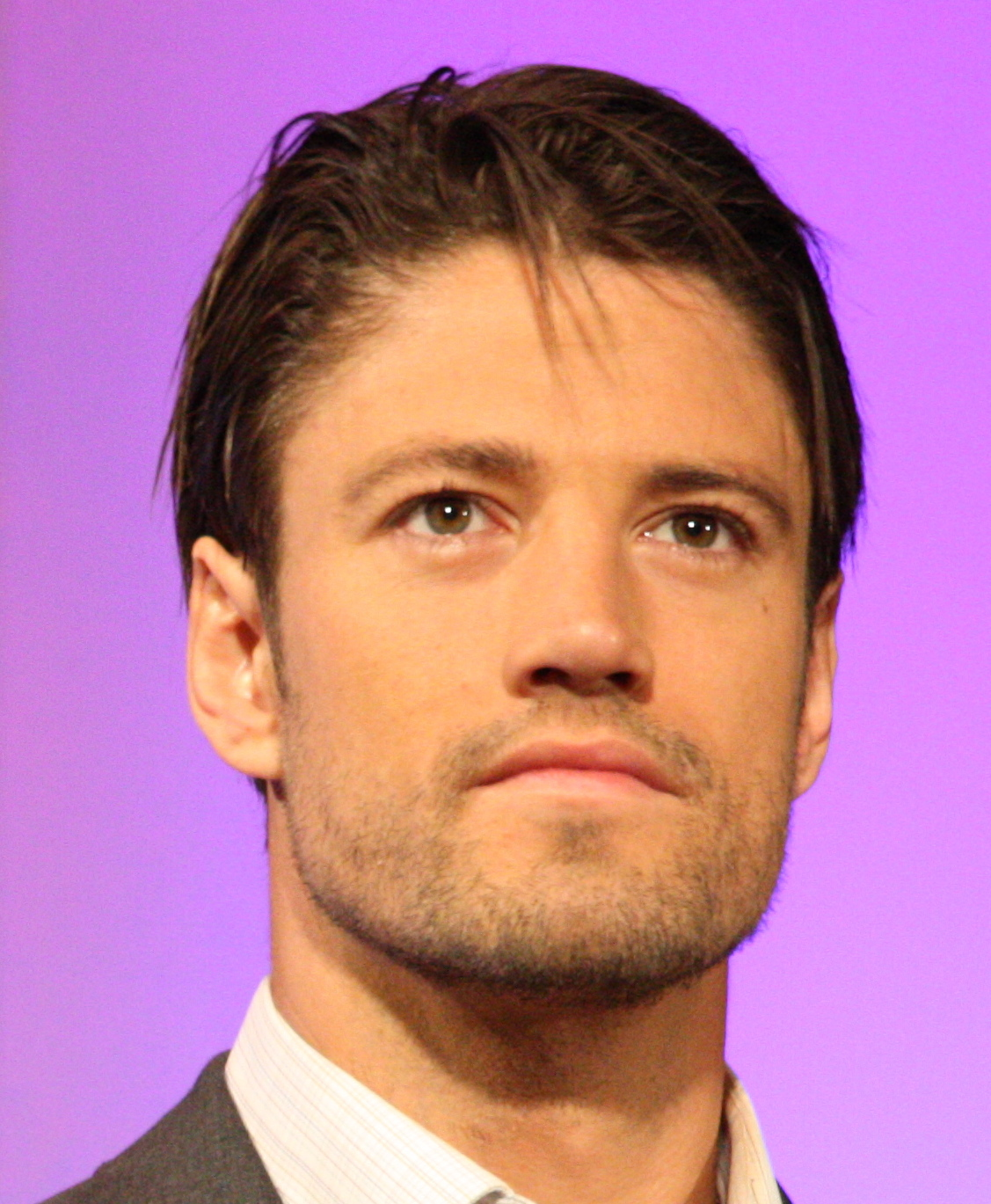
James Scott received two consecutive nominations (2010 and 2011) for his role as EJ DiMera on Days of Our Lives..

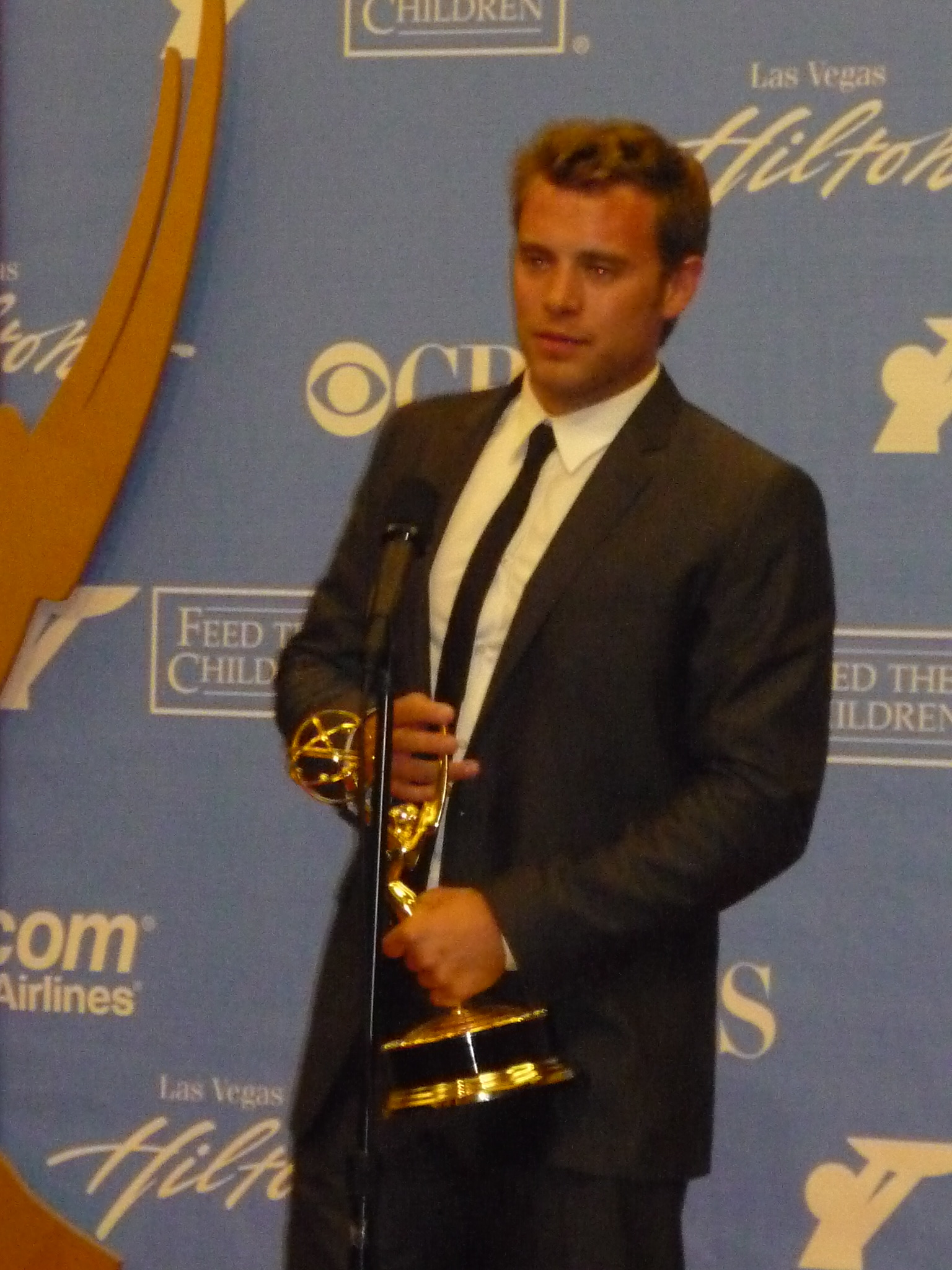
Billy Miller won in 2014 for his role as Billy Abbott on The Young and the Restless.

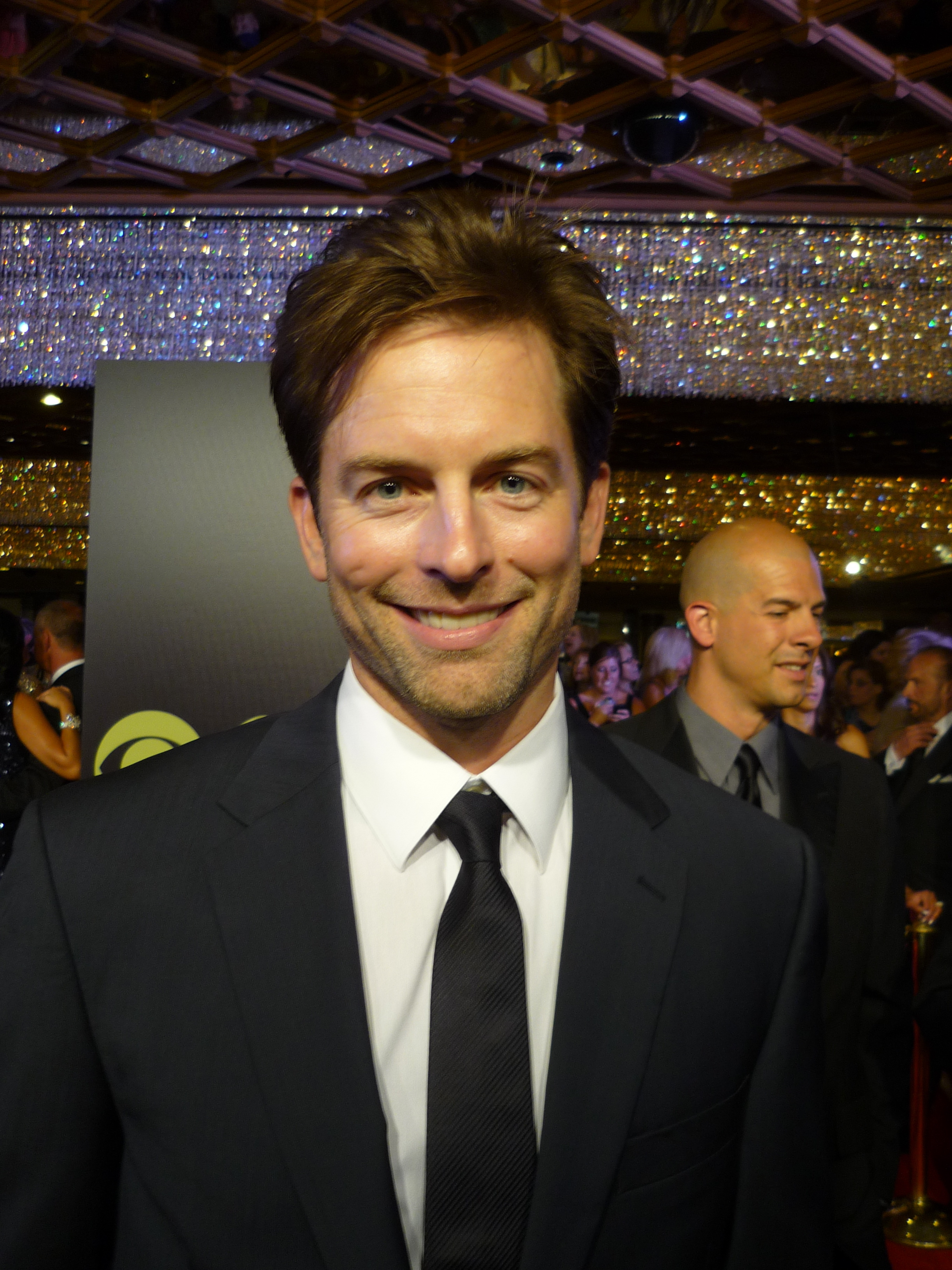
Michael Muhney earned a nomination in 2014, for his role as Adam Newman on The Young and the Restless.

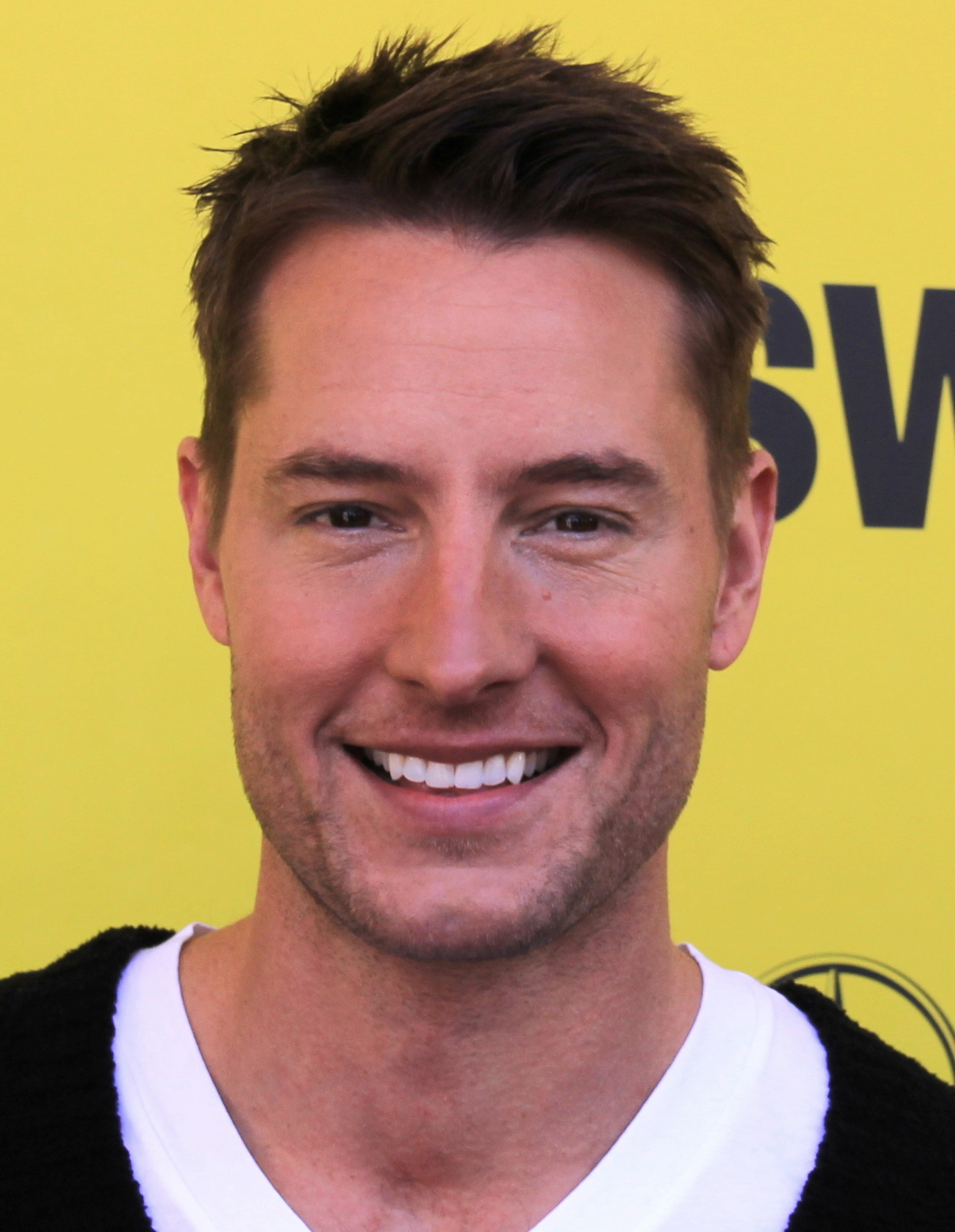
Justin Hartley, as the third actor, who played Adam Newman, received a nomination in 2016 for the role on The Young and the Restless.

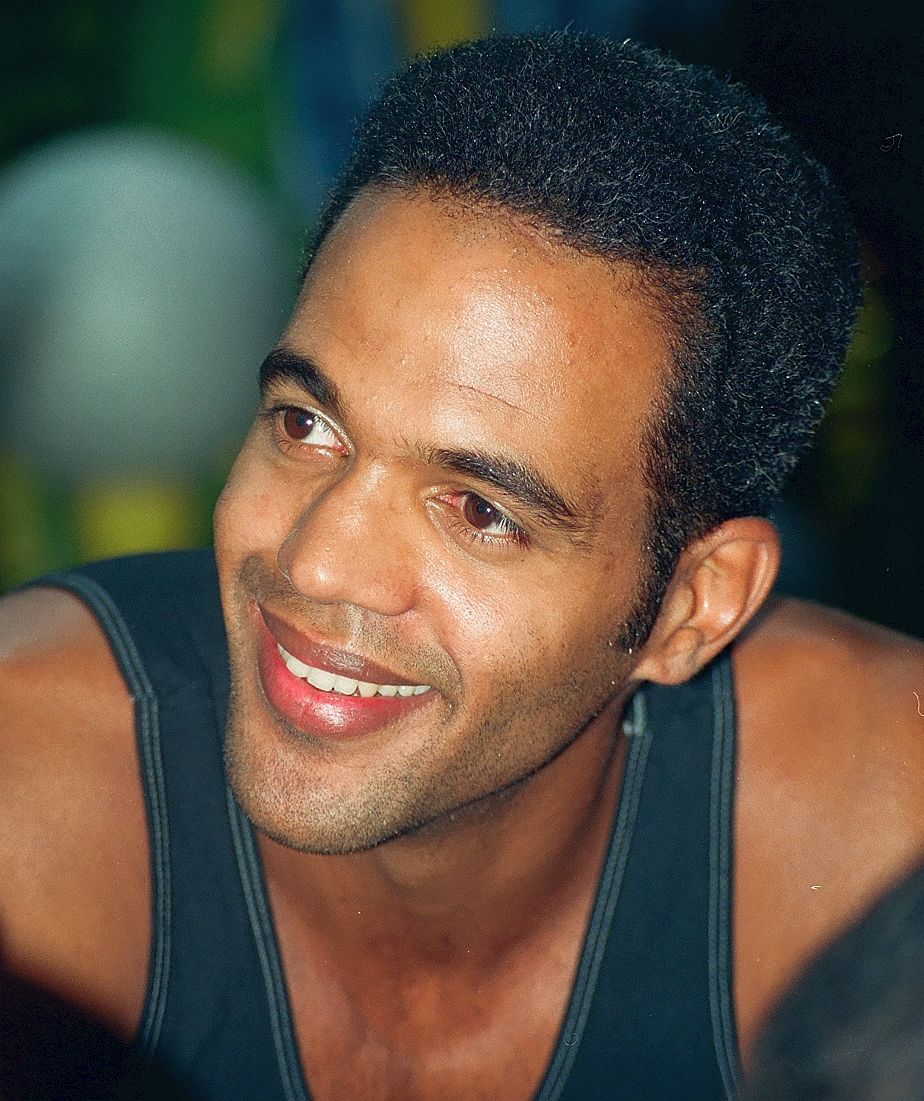
Kristoff St. John received two consecutive nominations (2016 and 2017) for his role as Neil Winters on The Young and the Restless.

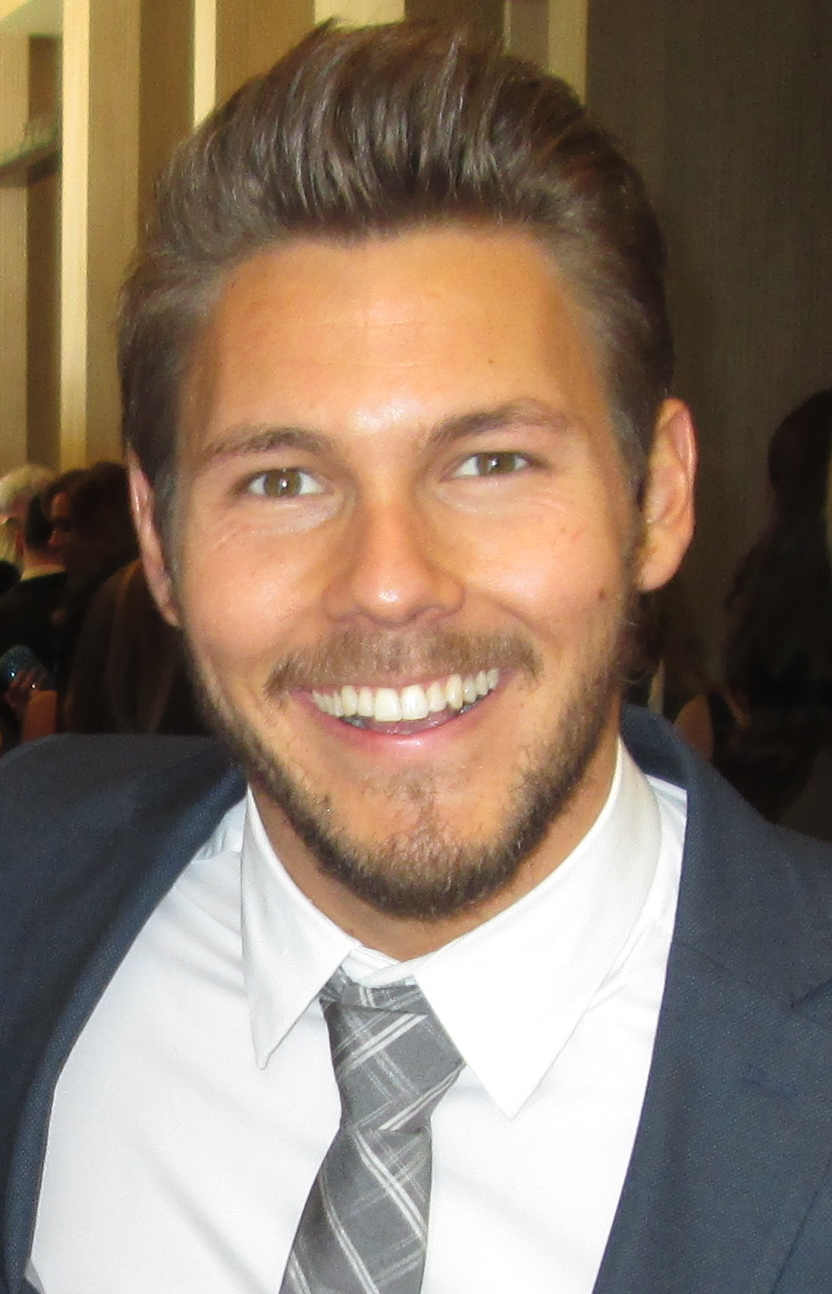
Scott Clifton won in 2017 and 2026 for his role as Liam Spencer on The Bold and the Beautiful.

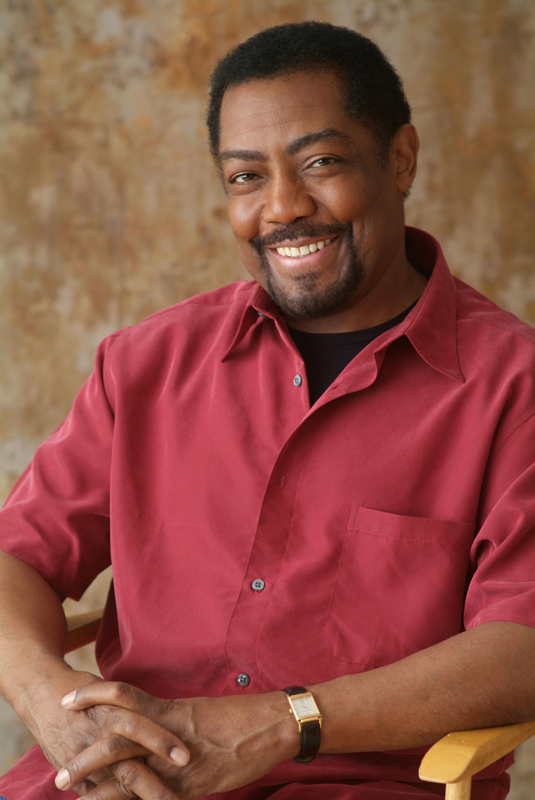
James Reynolds won in 2018 for his role as on Days of Our Lives.

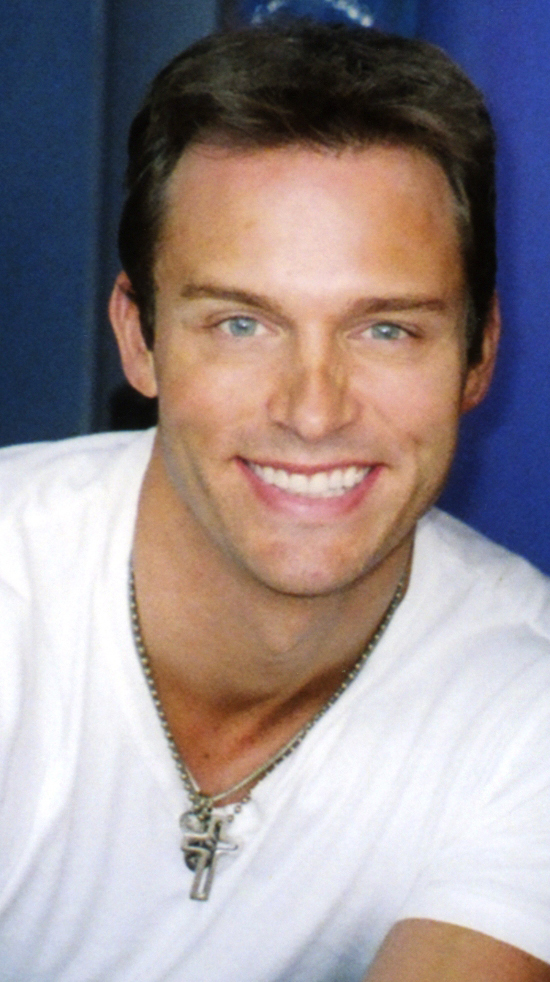
Eric Martsolf earned three nominations for his role as Brady Black on Days of Our Lives.

=== 1970s ===
Year	Actor	Program	Role	Network	Ref.
1974 (1st)	Macdonald Carey ‡	Days of Our Lives	Tom Horton	NBC	
1974 (1st)	John Beradino	General Hospital	Steve Hardy	ABC	
1974 (1st)	Peter Hansen	General Hospital	Lee Baldwin	ABC	
1975 (2nd)	Macdonald Carey ‡	Days of Our Lives	Tom Horton	NBC	
1975 (2nd)	John Beradino	General Hospital	Steve Hardy	ABC	
1975 (2nd)	Bill Hayes	Days of Our Lives	Doug Williams	NBC	
1976 (3rd)	Larry Haines ‡	Search for Tomorrow	Stu Bergman	CBS	
1976 (3rd)	John Beradino	General Hospital	Steve Hardy	ABC	
1976 (3rd)	Macdonald Carey	Days of Our Lives	Tom Horton	NBC	
1976 (3rd)	Bill Hayes	Days of Our Lives	Doug Williams	NBC	
1976 (3rd)	Michael Nouri	Search for Tomorrow	Steve Kaslo	CBS	
1976 (3rd)	Shepperd Strudwick	One Life to Live	Victor Lord	ABC	
1977 (4th)	Val Dufour ‡	Search for Tomorrow	John Wyatt	CBS	
1977 (4th)	Farley Granger	One Life to Live	Will Vernon	ABC	
1977 (4th)	Larry Haines	Search for Tomorrow	Stu Bergman	CBS	
1977 (4th)	Larry Keith	All My Children	Nick Davis	ABC	
1977 (4th)	James Pritchett	The Doctors	Matt Powers	NBC	
1978 (5th)	James Pritchett ‡	The Doctors	Matt Powers	NBC	
1978 (5th)	Matthew Cowles	All My Children	Billy Clyde Tuggle	ABC	
1978 (5th)	Larry Keith	All My Children	Nick Davis	ABC	
1978 (5th)	Michael Levin	Ryan's Hope	Jack Fenelli	ABC	
1978 (5th)	Andrew Robinson	Ryan's Hope	Frank Ryan	ABC	
1978 (5th)	Michael Storm	One Life to Live	Larry Wolek	ABC	
1979 (6th)	Al Freeman Jr. ‡	One Life to Live	Ed Hall	ABC	
1979 (6th)	Jed Allan	Days of Our Lives	Don Craig	NBC	
1979 (6th)	Nicholas Benedict	All My Children	Phil Brent	ABC	
1979 (6th)	John Clarke	Days of Our Lives	Mickey Horton	NBC	
1979 (6th)	Joel Crothers	The Edge of Night	Miles Cavanaugh	ABC	
1979 (6th)	Michael Levin	Ryan's Hope	Jack Fenelli	ABC	

=== 1980s ===
Year	Actor	Program	Role	Network	Ref.
1980 (7th)	Douglass Watson ‡	Another World	Mac Cory	NBC	
1980 (7th)	John Gabriel	Ryan's Hope	Seneca Beaulac	ABC	
1980 (7th)	Michael Levin	Ryan's Hope	Jack Fenelli	ABC	
1980 (7th)	Franc Luz	The Doctors	John Bennett	NBC	
1980 (7th)	James Mitchell	All My Children	Palmer Cortlandt	ABC	
1980 (7th)	William Mooney	All My Children	Paul Martin	ABC	
1981 (8th)	Douglass Watson ‡	Another World	Mac Cory	NBC	
1981 (8th)	Larry Bryggman	As the World Turns	John Dixon	CBS	
1981 (8th)	Henderson Forsythe	As the World Turns	David Stewart	CBS	
1981 (8th)	Anthony Geary	General Hospital	Luke Spencer	ABC	
1981 (8th)	James Mitchell	All My Children	Palmer Cortlandt	ABC	
1982 (9th)	Anthony Geary ‡	General Hospital	Luke Spencer	ABC	
1982 (9th)	Larry Bryggman	As the World Turns	John Dixon	CBS	
1982 (9th)	Stuart Damon	General Hospital	Alan Quartermaine	ABC	
1982 (9th)	James Mitchell	All My Children	Palmer Cortlandt	ABC	
1982 (9th)	Richard Shoberg	All My Children	Tom Cudahy	ABC	
1983 (10th)	Robert S. Woods ‡	One Life to Live	Bo Buchanan	ABC	
1983 (10th)	Peter Bergman	All My Children	Cliff Warner	ABC	
1983 (10th)	Stuart Damon	General Hospital	Alan Quartermaine	ABC	
1983 (10th)	Anthony Geary	General Hospital	Luke Spencer	ABC	
1983 (10th)	James Mitchell	All My Children	Palmer Cortlandt	ABC	
1984 (11th)	Larry Bryggman ‡	As the World Turns	John Dixon	CBS	
1984 (11th)	Joel Crothers	The Edge of Night	Miles Cavanaugh	ABC	
1984 (11th)	Stuart Damon	General Hospital	Alan Quartermaine	ABC	
1984 (11th)	Terry Lester	The Young and the Restless	Jack Abbott	CBS	
1984 (11th)	Larkin Malloy	The Edge of Night	Schuyler Whitney	ABC	
1984 (11th)	James Mitchell	All My Children	Palmer Cortlandt	ABC	
1985 (12th)	Darnell Williams ‡	All My Children	Jesse Hubbard	ABC	
1985 (12th)	Larry Bryggman	As the World Turns	John Dixon	CBS	
1985 (12th)	David Canary	All My Children	Adam Chandler/Stuart Chandler	ABC	
1985 (12th)	Terry Lester	The Young and the Restless	Jack Abbott	CBS	
1985 (12th)	James Mitchell	All My Children	Palmer Cortlandt	ABC	
1986 (13th)	David Canary ‡	All My Children	Adam Chandler/Stuart Chandler	ABC	
1986 (13th)	Scott Bryce	As the World Turns	Craig Montgomery	CBS	
1986 (13th)	Larry Bryggman	As the World Turns	John Dixon	CBS	
1986 (13th)	Nicolas Coster	Santa Barbara	Lionel Lockridge	NBC	
1986 (13th)	Terry Lester	The Young and the Restless	Jack Abbott	CBS	
1986 (13th)	Robert S. Woods	One Life to Live	Bo Buchanan	ABC	
1987 (14th)	Larry Bryggman ‡	As the World Turns	John Dixon	CBS	
1987 (14th)	Eric Braeden	The Young and the Restless	Victor Newman	CBS	
1987 (14th)	Scott Bryce	As the World Turns	Craig Montgomery	CBS	
1987 (14th)	Terry Lester	The Young and the Restless	Jack Abbott	CBS	
1987 (14th)	A Martinez	Santa Barbara	Cruz Castillo	NBC	
1988 (15th)	David Canary ‡	All My Children	Adam Chandler/Stuart Chandler	ABC	
1988 (15th)	Larry Bryggman	As the World Turns	John Dixon	CBS	
1988 (15th)	Robert Gentry	All My Children	Ross Chandler	ABC	
1988 (15th)	A Martinez	Santa Barbara	Cruz Castillo	NBC	
1988 (15th)	Stephen Nichols	Days of Our Lives	Steve "Patch" Johnson	NBC	
1989 (16th)	David Canary ‡	All My Children	Adam Chandler/Stuart Chandler	ABC	
1989 (16th)	Larry Bryggman	As the World Turns	John Dixon	CBS	
1989 (16th)	A Martinez	Santa Barbara	Cruz Castillo	NBC	
1989 (16th)	James Mitchell	All My Children	Palmer Cortlandt	ABC	
1989 (16th)	Douglass Watson	Another World	Mac Cory	NBC	

=== 1990s ===
Year	Actor	Program	Role	Network	Ref.
1990 (17th)	A Martinez ‡	Santa Barbara	Cruz Castillo	NBC	
1990 (17th)	Peter Bergman	The Young and the Restless	Jack Abbott	CBS	
1990 (17th)	Eric Braeden	The Young and the Restless	Victor Newman	CBS	
1990 (17th)	David Canary	All My Children	Adam Chandler/Stuart Chandler	ABC	
1990 (17th)	Stephen Schnetzer	Another World	Cass Winthrop	NBC	
1991 (18th)	Peter Bergman ‡	The Young and the Restless	Jack Abbott	CBS	
1991 (18th)	David Canary	All My Children	Adam Chandler/Stuart Chandler	ABC	
1991 (18th)	Nicolas Coster	Santa Barbara	Lionel Lockridge	NBC	
1991 (18th)	A Martinez	Santa Barbara	Cruz Castillo	NBC	
1991 (18th)	James Reynolds	Generations	Henry Marshall	NBC	
1992 (19th)	Peter Bergman ‡	The Young and the Restless	Jack Abbott	CBS	
1992 (19th)	David Canary	All My Children	Adam Chandler/Stuart Chandler	ABC	
1992 (19th)	Nicolas Coster	Santa Barbara	Lionel Lockridge	NBC	
1992 (19th)	A Martinez	Santa Barbara	Cruz Castillo	NBC	
1992 (19th)	Michael Zaslow	Guiding Light	Roger Thorpe	CBS	
1993 (20th)	David Canary ‡	All My Children	Adam Chandler/Stuart Chandler	ABC	
1993 (20th)	Peter Bergman	The Young and the Restless	Jack Abbott	CBS	
1993 (20th)	Mark Derwin	Guiding Light	A.C. Mallet	CBS	
1993 (20th)	A Martinez	Santa Barbara	Cruz Castillo	NBC	
1993 (20th)	Robert S. Woods	One Life to Live	Bo Buchanan	ABC	
1993 (20th)	Michael Zaslow	Guiding Light	Roger Thorpe	CBS	
1994 (21st)	Michael Zaslow ‡	Guiding Light	Roger Thorpe	CBS	
1994 (21st)	Peter Bergman	The Young and the Restless	Jack Abbott	CBS	
1994 (21st)	Charles Keating	Another World	Carl Hutchins	NBC	
1994 (21st)	Peter Simon	Guiding Light	Ed Bauer	CBS	
1994 (21st)	Robert S. Woods	One Life to Live	Bo Buchanan	ABC	
1995 (22nd)	Justin Deas ‡	Guiding Light	Buzz Cooper	CBS	
1995 (22nd)	Peter Bergman	The Young and the Restless	Jack Abbott	CBS	
1995 (22nd)	David Canary	All My Children	Adam Chandler/Stuart Chandler	ABC	
1995 (22nd)	Brad Maule	General Hospital	Tony Jones	ABC	
1995 (22nd)	Michael Zaslow	Guiding Light	Roger Thorpe	CBS	
1996 (23rd)	Charles Keating ‡	Another World	Carl Hutchins	NBC	
1996 (23rd)	Maurice Benard	General Hospital	Sonny Corinthos	ABC	
1996 (23rd)	Peter Bergman	The Young and the Restless	Jack Abbott	CBS	
1996 (23rd)	Eric Braeden	The Young and the Restless	Victor Newman	CBS	
1996 (23rd)	David Canary	All My Children	Adam Chandler/Stuart Chandler	ABC	
1997 (24th)	Justin Deas ‡	Guiding Light	Buzz Cooper	CBS	
1997 (24th)	Peter Bergman	The Young and the Restless	Jack Abbott	CBS	
1997 (24th)	Eric Braeden	The Young and the Restless	Victor Newman	CBS	
1997 (24th)	David Canary	All My Children	Adam Chandler/Stuart Chandler	ABC	
1997 (24th)	Anthony Geary	General Hospital	Luke Spencer	ABC	
1998 (25th)	Eric Braeden ‡	The Young and the Restless	Victor Newman	CBS	
1998 (25th)	Peter Bergman	The Young and the Restless	Jack Abbott	CBS	
1998 (25th)	David Canary	All My Children	Adam Chandler/Stuart Chandler	ABC	
1998 (25th)	Anthony Geary	General Hospital	Luke Spencer	ABC	
1998 (25th)	Kin Shriner	Port Charles	Scott Baldwin	ABC	
1999 (26th)	Anthony Geary ‡	General Hospital	Luke Spencer	ABC	
1999 (26th)	Peter Bergman	The Young and the Restless	Jack Abbott	CBS	
1999 (26th)	Eric Braeden	The Young and the Restless	Victor Newman	CBS	
1999 (26th)	David Canary	All My Children	Adam Chandler/Stuart Chandler	ABC	
1999 (26th)	Robert S. Woods	One Life to Live	Bo Buchanan	ABC	

=== 2000s ===
Year	Actor	Program	Role	Network	Ref.
2000 (27th)	Anthony Geary ‡	General Hospital	Luke Spencer	ABC	
2000 (27th)	Peter Bergman	The Young and the Restless	Jack Abbott	CBS	
2000 (27th)	Eric Braeden	The Young and the Restless	Victor Newman	CBS	
2000 (27th)	David Canary	All My Children	Adam Chandler/Stuart Chandler	ABC	
2000 (27th)	Robert S. Woods	One Life to Live	Bo Buchanan	ABC	
2001 (28th)	David Canary ‡	All My Children	Adam Chandler/Stuart Chandler	ABC	
2001 (28th)	Peter Bergman	The Young and the Restless	Jack Abbott	CBS	
2001 (28th)	Tom Eplin	As the World Turns	Jake McKinnon	CBS	
2001 (28th)	Jon Hensley	As the World Turns	Holden Snyder	CBS	
2001 (28th)	John McCook	The Bold and the Beautiful	Eric Forrester	CBS	
2002 (29th)	Peter Bergman ‡	The Young and the Restless	Jack Abbott	CBS	
2002 (29th)	Hunt Block	As the World Turns	Craig Montgomery	CBS	
2002 (29th)	Vincent Irizarry	All My Children	David Hayward	ABC	
2002 (29th)	Robert Newman	Guiding Light	Josh Lewis	CBS	
2002 (29th)	Jack Scalia	All My Children	Chris Stamp	ABC	
2003 (30th)	Maurice Benard ‡	General Hospital	Sonny Corinthos	ABC	
2003 (30th)	Grant Aleksander	Guiding Light	Phillip Spaulding	CBS	
2003 (30th)	Doug Davidson	The Young and the Restless	Paul Williams	CBS	
2003 (30th)	Anthony Geary	General Hospital	Luke Spencer	ABC	
2003 (30th)	Ricky Paull Goldin	Guiding Light	Gus Aitoro	CBS	
2003 (30th)	Thorsten Kaye	Port Charles	Ian Thornhart	ABC	
2004 (31st)	Anthony Geary ‡	General Hospital	Luke Spencer	ABC	
2004 (31st)	Grant Aleksander	Guiding Light	Phillip Spaulding	CBS	
2004 (31st)	Maurice Benard	General Hospital	Sonny Corinthos	ABC	
2004 (31st)	Eric Braeden	The Young and the Restless	Victor Newman	CBS	
2004 (31st)	Roger Howarth	As the World Turns	Paul Ryan	CBS	
2004 (31st)	Thorsten Kaye	Port Charles	Ian Thornhart	ABC	
2005 (32nd)	Christian LeBlanc ‡	The Young and the Restless	Michael Baldwin	CBS	
2005 (32nd)	Grant Aleksander	Guiding Light	Phillip Spaulding	CBS	
2005 (32nd)	Steve Burton	General Hospital	Jason Morgan	ABC	
2005 (32nd)	Roger Howarth	As the World Turns	Paul Ryan	CBS	
2005 (32nd)	Michael E. Knight	All My Children	Tad Martin	ABC	
2005 (32nd)	Jack Wagner	The Bold and the Beautiful	Nick Marone	CBS	
2006 (33rd)	Anthony Geary ‡	General Hospital	Luke Spencer	ABC	
2006 (33rd)	Maurice Benard	General Hospital	Sonny Corinthos	ABC	
2006 (33rd)	Thorsten Kaye	All My Children	Zach Slater	ABC	
2006 (33rd)	Robert Newman	Guiding Light	Josh Lewis	CBS	
2006 (33rd)	Ron Raines	Guiding Light	Alan Spaulding	CBS	
2007 (34th)	Christian LeBlanc ‡	The Young and the Restless	Michael Baldwin	CBS	
2007 (34th)	Peter Bergman	The Young and the Restless	Jack Abbott	CBS	
2007 (34th)	Anthony Geary	General Hospital	Luke Spencer	ABC	
2007 (34th)	Ricky Paull Goldin	Guiding Light	Gus Aitoro	CBS	
2007 (34th)	Michael Park	As the World Turns	Jack Snyder	CBS	
2008 (35th)	Anthony Geary ‡	General Hospital	Luke Spencer	ABC	
2008 (35th)	Peter Bergman	The Young and the Restless	Jack Abbott	CBS	
2008 (35th)	David Canary	All My Children	Adam Chandler/Stuart Chandler	ABC	
2008 (35th)	Christian LeBlanc	The Young and the Restless	Michael Baldwin	CBS	
2008 (35th)	Thaao Penghlis	Days of Our Lives	Tony DiMera/Andre DiMera	NBC	
2009 (36th)	Christian LeBlanc ‡	The Young and the Restless	Michael Baldwin	CBS	
2009 (36th)	Daniel Cosgrove	Guiding Light	Bill Lewis	CBS	
2009 (36th)	Anthony Geary	General Hospital	Luke Spencer	ABC	
2009 (36th)	Thorsten Kaye	All My Children	Zach Slater	ABC	
2009 (36th)	Peter Reckell	Days of Our Lives	Bo Brady	NBC	

=== 2010s ===
Year	Actor	Program	Role	Network	Ref.
2010 (37th)	Michael Park ‡	As the World Turns	Jack Snyder	CBS	
2010 (37th)	Peter Bergman	The Young and the Restless	Jack Abbott	CBS	
2010 (37th)	Doug Davidson	The Young and the Restless	Paul Williams	CBS	
2010 (37th)	Jon Lindstrom	As the World Turns	Craig Montgomery	CBS	
2010 (37th)	James Scott	Days of Our Lives	EJ DiMera	NBC	
2011 (38th)	Michael Park ‡	As the World Turns	Jack Snyder	CBS	
2011 (38th)	Maurice Benard	General Hospital	Sonny Corinthos	ABC	
2011 (38th)	Ricky Paull Goldin	All My Children	Jake Martin	ABC	
2011 (38th)	Christian LeBlanc	The Young and the Restless	Michael Baldwin	CBS	
2011 (38th)	James Scott	Days of Our Lives	EJ DiMera	NBC	
2012 (39th)	Anthony Geary ‡	General Hospital	Luke Spencer	ABC	
2012 (39th)	Maurice Benard	General Hospital	Sonny Corinthos	ABC	
2012 (39th)	John McCook	The Bold and the Beautiful	Eric Forrester	CBS	
2012 (39th)	Darnell Williams	All My Children	Jesse Hubbard	ABC	
2012 (39th)	Robert S. Woods	One Life to Live	Bo Buchanan	ABC	
2013 (40th)	Doug Davidson ‡	The Young and the Restless	Paul Williams	CBS	
2013 (40th)	Peter Bergman	The Young and the Restless	Jack Abbott	CBS	
2013 (40th)	Michael Muhney	The Young and the Restless	Adam Newman	CBS	
2013 (40th)	Jason Thompson	General Hospital	Dr. Patrick Drake	ABC	
2014 (41st)	Billy Miller ‡	The Young and the Restless	Billy Abbott	CBS	
2014 (41st)	Peter Bergman	The Young and the Restless	Jack Abbott	CBS	
2014 (41st)	Doug Davidson	The Young and the Restless	Paul Williams	CBS	
2014 (41st)	Christian LeBlanc	The Young and the Restless	Michael Baldwin	CBS	
2014 (41st)	Jason Thompson	General Hospital	Dr. Patrick Drake	ABC	
2015 (42nd)	Anthony Geary ‡	General Hospital	Luke Spencer	ABC	
2015 (42nd)	Christian LeBlanc	The Young and the Restless	Michael Baldwin	CBS	
2015 (42nd)	Billy Miller	The Young and the Restless	Billy Abbott	CBS	
2015 (42nd)	Jason Thompson	General Hospital	Dr. Patrick Drake	ABC	
2016 (43rd)	Tyler Christopher ‡	General Hospital	Nikolas Cassadine	ABC	
2016 (43rd)	Anthony Geary	General Hospital	Luke Spencer/Tim Spencer	ABC	
2016 (43rd)	Justin Hartley	The Young and the Restless	Adam Newman	CBS	
2016 (43rd)	Christian LeBlanc	The Young and the Restless	Michael Baldwin	CBS	
2016 (43rd)	Kristoff St. John	The Young and the Restless	Neil Winters	CBS	
2017 (44th)	Scott Clifton ‡	The Bold and the Beautiful	Liam Spencer	CBS	
2017 (44th)	Peter Bergman	The Young and the Restless	Jack Abbott	CBS	
2017 (44th)	Billy Flynn	Days of Our Lives	Chad DiMera	NBC	
2017 (44th)	Vincent Irizarry	Days of Our Lives	Deimos Kiriakis	NBC	
2017 (44th)	Kristoff St. John	The Young and the Restless	Neil Winters	CBS	
2018 (45th)
2018 (45th)	James Reynolds ‡	Days of Our Lives	Abe Carver	NBC	
2018 (45th)	Peter Bergman	The Young and the Restless	Jack Abbott	CBS	
2018 (45th)	Michael Easton	General Hospital	Dr. Hamilton Finn	ABC	
2018 (45th)	John McCook	The Bold and the Beautiful	Eric Forrester	CBS	
2018 (45th)	Billy Miller	General Hospital	Jason Morgan/Andrew Cain	ABC	
2019 (46th)
2019 (46th)	Maurice Benard ‡	General Hospital	Sonny Corinthos	ABC	
2019 (46th)	Peter Bergman	The Young and the Restless	Jack Abbott	CBS	
2019 (46th)	Tyler Christopher	Days of Our Lives	Stefan DiMera	NBC	
2019 (46th)	Billy Flynn	Days of Our Lives	Chad DiMera	NBC	
2019 (46th)	Jon Lindstrom	General Hospital	Dr. Kevin Collins/Ryan Chamberlain	ABC	

=== 2020s ===
Year	Actor	Program	Role	Network	Ref.
2020 (47th)
2020 (47th)	Jason Thompson ‡	The Young and the Restless	Billy Abbott	CBS	
2020 (47th)	Steve Burton	General Hospital	Jason Morgan	ABC	
2020 (47th)	Thorsten Kaye	The Bold and the Beautiful	Ridge Forrester	CBS	
2020 (47th)	Jon Lindstrom	General Hospital	Dr. Kevin Collins/Ryan Chamberlain	ABC	
2020 (47th)	Thaao Penghlis	Days of Our Lives	Tony DiMera	NBC	
2021 (48th)	Maurice Benard ‡	General Hospital	Sonny Corinthos	ABC	
2021 (48th)	Steve Burton	General Hospital	Jason Morgan	ABC	
2021 (48th)	Thorsten Kaye	The Bold and the Beautiful	Ridge Forrester	CBS	
2021 (48th)	Wally Kurth	Days of Our Lives	Justin Kiriakis	NBC	
2021 (48th)	Dominic Zamprogna	General Hospital	Dante Falconeri	ABC	
2022 (49th)
2022 (49th)	John McCook ‡	The Bold and the Beautiful	Eric Forrester	CBS	
2022 (49th)	Peter Bergman	The Young and the Restless	Jack Abbott	CBS	
2022 (49th)	Eric Martsolf	Days of Our Lives	Brady Black	NBC	
2022 (49th)	James Reynolds	Days of Our Lives	Abe Carver	NBC	
2022 (49th)	Jason Thompson	The Young and the Restless	Billy Abbott	CBS	
2023 (50th)
2023 (50th)	Thorsten Kaye ‡	The Bold and the Beautiful	Ridge Forrester	CBS	
2023 (50th)	Maurice Benard	General Hospital	Sonny Corinthos	ABC	
2023 (50th)	Peter Bergman	The Young and the Restless	Jack Abbott	CBS	
2023 (50th)	Billy Flynn	Days of Our Lives	Chad DiMera	NBC/Peacock	
2023 (50th)	Jason Thompson	The Young and the Restless	Billy Abbott	CBS	
2024 (51st)
2024 (51st)	Thorsten Kaye ‡	The Bold and the Beautiful	Ridge Forrester	CBS	
2024 (51st)	Eric Braeden	The Young and the Restless	Victor Newman	CBS	
2024 (51st)	Scott Clifton	The Bold and the Beautiful	Liam Spencer	CBS	
2024 (51st)	Eric Martsolf	Days of Our Lives	Brady Black	Peacock	
2024 (51st)	John McCook	The Bold and the Beautiful	Eric Forrester	CBS	
2025 (52nd)
2025 (52nd)	Paul Telfer ‡	Days of Our Lives	Xander Kiriakis	Peacock	
2025 (52nd)	Peter Bergman	The Young and the Restless	Jack Abbott	CBS	
2025 (52nd)	Eric Martsolf	Days of Our Lives	Brady Black	Peacock	
2025 (52nd)	Greg Rikaart	Days of Our Lives	Leo Stark	Peacock	
2025 (52nd)	Dominic Zamprogna	General Hospital	Dante Falconeri	ABC	
2026 (53rd)
2026 (53rd)	Scott Clifton ‡	The Bold and the Beautiful	Liam Spencer	CBS	
2026 (53rd)	Eric Braeden	The Young and the Restless	Victor Newman	CBS	
2026 (53rd)	Steve Burton	General Hospital	Jason Morgan	ABC	
2026 (53rd)	Thorsten Kaye	The Bold and the Beautiful	Ridge Forrester	CBS	
2026 (53rd)	Christian LeBlanc	The Young and the Restless	Michael Baldwin	CBS	

== Performers with multiple wins ==
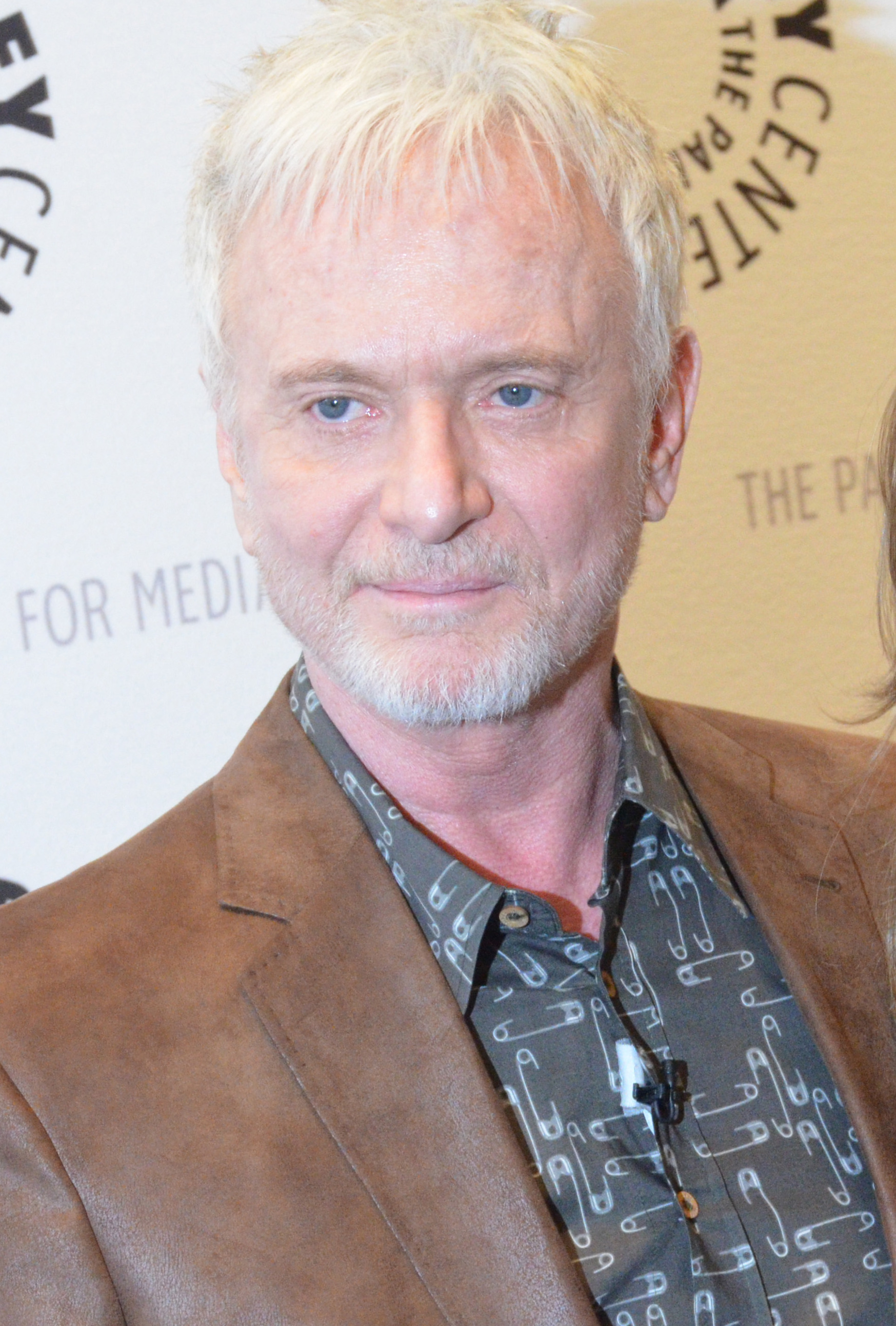
Anthony Geary has the most wins in this category, with a total of eight, for his role as Luke Spencer on General Hospital.

The following individuals received two or more wins in this category:

8 wins

- Anthony Geary

5 wins

- David Canary

3 wins

- Peter Bergman
- Maurice Bernard
- Christian LeBlanc

2 wins

- Larry Bryggman
- Macdonald Carey
- Scott Clifton
- Justin Deas
- Thorsten Kaye
- Michael Park
- Douglass Watson

== Performers with multiple nominations ==
The following individuals received two or more nominations in this category:

25 nominations

- Peter Bergman

16 nominations

- David Canary
- Anthony Geary

10 nominations

- Eric Braeden

9 nominations

- Maurice Benard
- Christian LeBlanc
- Thorsten Kaye

8 nominations

- Larry Bryggman

7 nominations

- A Martinez
- James Mitchell
- Robert S. Woods

6 nominations

- Jason Thompson

4 nominations

- Steve Burton
- Doug Davidson
- Terry Lester
- Michael Zaslow
- John McCook

3 nominations

- Grant Aleksander
- Scott Clifton
- John Beradino
- Macdonald Carey
- Nicolas Coster
- Stuart Damon
- Billy Flynn
- Ricky Paull Goldin
- Michael Levin
- Jon Lindstrom
- Eric Martsolf
- Michael Park
- James Reynolds
- Douglass Watson

2 nominations

- Scott Bryce
- Joel Crothers
- Tyler Christopher
- Justin Deas
- Bill Hayes
- Roger Howarth
- Vincent Irizarry
- Charles Keating
- Larry Keith
- Billy Miller
- Robert Newman
- Thaao Penghlis
- James Pritchett
- James Scott
- Kristoff St. John
- Darnell Williams
- Dominic Zamprogna

== Series with most awards ==
12 wins

- General Hospital

10 wins

- The Young and the Restless

6 wins

- All My Children

5 wins

- The Bold and the Beautiful

4 wins

- As the World Turns
- Days of our Lives

3 wins

- Another World
- Guiding Light

2 wins

- One Life to Live
- Search for Tomorrow
