= 14th Daytime Emmy Awards =

- Date: June 30, 1987
- Location: Sheraton New York Times Square Hotel
- Presented by: National Academy of Television Arts and Sciences
- Hosted by: Oprah Winfrey

Highlights
- Outstanding Drama Series: As the World Turns
- Outstanding Game Show: The $25,000 Pyramid

Television/radio coverage
- Network: ABC

The 14th Daytime Emmy Awards were held on Tuesday, June 30, 1987, to commemorate excellence in daytime programming from the previous year (1986). Telecast from 3-5 p.m. on ABC, the ceremony preempted General Hospital.

Winners in each category are in bold.

== Outstanding Daytime Drama Series ==
- All My Children
- **As the World Turns**
- Santa Barbara
- The Young and the Restless

== Outstanding Actor in a Daytime Drama Series ==
- Scott Bryce (Craig Montgomery, As the World Turns)
- **Larry Bryggman** (**John Dixon, As the World Turns**)
- A Martinez (Cruz Castillo, Santa Barbara)
- Eric Braeden (Victor Newman, The Young and the Restless)
- Terry Lester (Jack Abbott, The Young and the Restless)

== Outstanding Actress in a Daytime Drama Series ==
- Susan Lucci (Erica Kane, All My Children)
- Elizabeth Hubbard (Lucinda Walsh, As the World Turns)
- Frances Reid (Alice Horton, Days of Our Lives)
- **Kim Zimmer** (**Reva Shayne, Guiding Light**)
- Marcy Walker (Eden Capwell, Santa Barbara)

== Outstanding Supporting Actor in a Daytime Drama Series ==
- **Gregg Marx** (**Tom Hughes, As the World Turns**)
- Anthony Call (Herb Callison, One Life to Live)
- Al Freeman, Jr. (Ed Hall, One Life to Live)
- Justin Deas (Keith Timmons, Santa Barbara)
- Richard Eden (Brick Wallace, Santa Barbara)

== Outstanding Supporting Actress in a Daytime Drama Series ==
- **Kathleen Noone** (Ellen Dalton, **All My Children**)
- Lisa Brown (Iva Snyder, As the World Turns)
- Kathleen Widdoes (Emma Snyder, As the World Turns)
- Peggy McCay (Caroline Brady, Days of Our Lives)
- Robin Mattson (Gina Lockridge, Santa Barbara)

== Outstanding Young Man in a Daytime Drama Series ==
- **Michael E. Knight (Tad Martin, All My Children**)
- Brian Bloom (Dusty Donovan, As the World Turns)
- Jon Hensley (Holden Snyder, As the World Turns)
- Billy Warlock (Frankie Brady, Days of Our Lives)
- Grant Show (Rick Hyde, Ryan's Hope)

== Outstanding Ingenue in a Daytime Drama Series ==
- **Martha Byrne (Lily Walsh, As the World Turns)**
- Krista Tesreau (Mindy Lewis, Guiding Light)
- Robin Wright (Kelly Capwell, Santa Barbara)
- Jane Krakowski (T.R. Kendall, Search for Tomorrow)
- Tracey E. Bregman (Lauren Fenmore, The Young and the Restless)

== Outstanding Guest Performer in a Daytime Drama Series ==
- **John Wesley Shipp (Martin Ellis, Santa Barbara)**
- Pamela Blair (Maida Andrews, All My Children)
- Terrence Mann (Jester, As the World Turns)
- Celeste Holm (Clara Woodhouse and Lydia Woodhouse, Loving)
- Eileen Heckart (Ruth Perkins, One Life to Live)

== Outstanding Daytime Drama Series Writing ==
- Days of our Lives
- The Young and the Restless
- **One Life to Live**

== Outstanding Daytime Drama Series Directing ==
- All My Children
- Days of our Lives
- As the World Turns
- **The Young and the Restless**

== Outstanding Game Show ==
- **The $25,000 Pyramid** - A Bob-Sande Stewart Production for CBS (Syn. by 20th Century Fox)
- Jeopardy! - A Merv Griffin Production (Syn. by KingWorld)
- The Price Is Right - A Mark Goodson Production for CBS
- Wheel of Fortune - A Merv Griffin Production for NBC (Syn. by KingWorld)

== Outstanding Game Show Host ==
- **Bob Barker** (The Price Is Right)
- Dick Clark (The $25,000 Pyramid)
- Pat Sajak (Wheel of Fortune)
- Alex Trebek (Jeopardy!)

== Outstanding Animated Program ==
- Joe Ruby, Ken Spears, Janice Karman, Ross Bagdasarian Jr. and Charles A. Nichols (Alvin and the Chipmunks)
- **Margaret Loesch, Jim Henson, Lee Gunther, Bob Richardson, Gerry Chiniquy, Bob Kirk, Robert Shellhorn and Jeffrey Scott (Muppet Babies)**
- Joe Ruby, Ken Spears, Cosmo Anzilotti, Charles A. Nichols John Kimball and Rudy Larriva (It's Punky Brewster)
- Fred Wolf, Art Vitello and Jymn Magon (Disney's Adventures of the Gummi Bears)
- Freddy Monnickendam, William Hanna, Joseph Barbera, Bob Hathcock, Ray Patterson, Don Lusk, Jay Sarbry, Carl Urbano and Rudy Zamora (The Smurfs)
