= Holden Snyder and Lily Walsh =

Holden and Lily
- Martha Byrne and Jon Hensley as Holden and Lily
- Duration: 1985–95; 1997–2010
- Introduced by: Robert Calhoun
- Noelle Beck and Jon Hensley as Holden and Lily
In-universe information
- Other names: Lilden
- Family: Snyder
- Spouse: 1991–93; 2002–09
- Children: Luke Snyder; Faith Snyder; Natalie Snyder; Ethan Snyder

Holden Snyder and Lily Walsh Snyder are fictional characters and the signature supercouple of the CBS daytime soap opera As the World Turns. The role of Lily was first portrayed by actress Lucy Deakins from 1984 until her departure in 1985, when actress Martha Byrne joined the cast in 1985, which began the pairing of Lily with Holden opposite actor Jon Hensley. Byrne departed the role of Lily in 1989, and it was recast with actress Heather Rattray. In 1993, Rattray was let go from the series and Byrne returned to the role. In 2008, Byrne made her high-profiled exit from the series and the role was once again recast with Noelle Beck, who remained in the role until the series finale in September 2010. Hensley is the only actor to portray the role of Holden for the character's duration with the series.

== Casting ==
=== Lily Walsh Snyder ===
The role of Lily Walsh was originated by actress Lucy Deakins, who debuted in the role in June 1984. Deakins departed the role a year later in 1985 and actress Martha Byrne took claim. Byrne remained with the series for four years, until she decided to depart the role; she was subsequently replaced by actress Heather Rattray. Upon Rattray's dismissal in 1993, Byrne returned to the role. Byrne remained in the role for nearly 15 years, until in 2008, she announced her decision to depart the series over contract negotiations. The role was then recast with former Loving actress Noelle Beck, who remained with the series until its final episode in September 2010.

=== Holden Snyder ===
In 1985, actor Jon Hensley was hired into the role of Holden Snyder and made his debut in October 1985. In 1987, it was announced that Hensley would depart the series following the completion of his contract later in the same year. Hensley returned three years later in 1990, only to depart the role once more in 1995. In 1997, Hensley returned for a second time to the role. He remained with the series until its finale in September 2010.

== Reception ==
=== General ===
At the 2000 Soap Opera Digest Awards, Byrne and Hensley were nominated for "Favorite Couple" as Lily and Holden. However, they lost to One Life to Live's Erika Slezak (Victoria Lord) and Mark Derwin (Ben Davidson). In 2008, Entertainment Weekly named the couple one of their "17 Great Soap Supercouples" at number seven. Byrne revealed that the pairing of Lily and Holden was by chance, due to then-head writer Douglas Marland. She remarked, "It was only supposed to be for the summer. Holden was only going to be introduced [on the canvas] through Lily, but he was not going to be her love interest. It was not supposed to be a romantic thing. But Doug Marland [the show's late head writer] changed the whole storyline, because he liked us together."

== See also ==
- List of supercouples

== References and notes ==
1.Luke Snyder is the biological child of Lily and Damian Grimaldi, and the adoptive son of Holden.
