= List of As the World Turns characters =

This is a list of some of the major or minor characters that appear (or have appeared) on the soap opera As the World Turns.

== A ==
Karen Adams
Doe Lang (1968–70)

Registered nurse.

Reg Addington
Mark Sullivan (2008–09)

Bart Albertini
Robert Turano (2007)

Neal Keller Alcott
Mary Kay Adams (1992–93)

Sister to Royce Keller; half-sister of Lucinda Walsh. Formerly married to Michael Alcott.

Greta Aldrin
Joan Copeland (1982)
Rosemary Murphy (1989)

David Allen
Chris Browning (1997–2000)
Daniel Markel (1997–99)

Josie Anderson
Kristen Connolly (2008–09)

Kirk Anderson
Tom Wiggin (1988–98)

Father of Linda Ann Anderson and Stephen Anderson. Married to Samantha Markham. Formerly married to Lenore Carpenter and Ellie Snyder.

Samantha Anderson
Brooke Alexander (1994–96)
Sherri Alexander (1997–98)

Half-sister of Lucinda Walsh. Married to Kirk Anderson. Mother of Georgia Tucker.

Stephen Anderson
James Van Der Beek (1995)

Garth Andrews
Tade Reen (2000)

Danielle Andropoulos
Joshua Dalin (1983)
Colleen Broomall (1983–89)
Kristanna Loken (1994)
Ashley Williams (1994–96)
Deidre Skiles (2008–09)

Daughter of Betsy Stewart and Steve Andropoulos.

Elizabeth "Betsy" Stewart Andropoulos
Lindsay Frost (1984–87)
Meg Ryan (1982-1984)
Jordan Baker (1994)

Margaret Crawford Andropoulos
Mary Linda Rapeleye (1980–85)

Sister of Lyla Montgomery Peretti; ex-wife of Frank Andropoulos

Nick Andropoulos
Michael Forest (1980–82)

Deceased fourth husband of Kim Sullivan Hughes. Brother of Steve.

Steve Andropoulos
Frank Runyeon (1980–87)

Brother of Nick Andropoulos; ex-husband of Carol Stallings, Diana McColl, and Betsy Stewart. Father of Danielle Andropoulos.

Steve Avery
Samuel Stricklen (2006)

Dean Avian
Donald Berman (1990)

Ameera Ali Aziz
Tala Ashe (2008)

== B ==
Cleo Babbitt
Jennifer Landon (2007)

Mentally unstable look-a-like of Gwen Norbeck.

Corinne Bailey
Pearl Bailey (1982)

Grace Baker
Selena Royle (1956–59)
Frances Reid (1959–62)
Murial Williams (1962–19??)

Mother of Jeff Baker.

Jeff Baker
Mark Rydell (1956–62)

Deceased. Penny Hughes' first (and second) husband.

Natalie Bannon
Judith Chapman (1975–78)
Janet Zarish (1981)

Second ex-wife of Tom Hughes.

Hank Barton
Peter Burnell (1969)

Courtney Baxter
Hayley Barr (1990–94)

Sister of Sean Baxter. Dated Andy Dixon.

Sean Baxter
Burke Moses (1989–91)
Mark Lewis (1992)

Brother of Courtney Baxter.

Suzanne Becker
Betsy Palmer (1982)

Tad Becker
Tanner Cohen (2006)

Marty Bendel
Ed Moran (2004)

Camille Bennett
Lauren B. Martin (1997–2000)

Ambrose Bingham
William LeMassena (1985–92)
Dillon Evans (1986)
Dick Latessa (1993)

Andrew Blackmoore
Luther Creek (2004)

Guido Boggia
Aleksander Krupa (2001)

Inspector.

Russell Boyd
Jay Bontatibus (1999)

Gary Bradshaw
Neal Bledsoe (2007)

Franny Brennan
Toni Darnay (1963–65)

Joe Bruno
Humbert Allen Astredo (1970)

Susan Burke
Connie Scott (1966)

== C ==
Alexander Cabot
Paul Hecht (1992–95)

Jesse Calhoun
Thomas Sadoski (2007)

Dr. Doug Campbell
Denis Romer (1979)

Marcia Campbell
Cynthia Bostick (1979)

Gabriel Caras
Ben Levin (2010)

Red Carter
Arch Johnson (1984)

Dr. Douglas Cassen
Nat Polen (1956–67)

Martin Chedwyn
Simon Prebble (1996)

Janet Ciccone
Julie Pinson (2008–10)

Had an affair with Brad Snyder as a teenager, producing daughter Liberty Ciccone. Formerly married to Jack Snyder; gave birth to Dusty Donovan's son Lorenzo.

Liberty Ciccone
Meredith Hagner (2008–10)
Sarah Wilson (2010)

Daughter of Janet Ciccone and Brad Snyder. Formerly involved with Parker Snyder.

Teri Ciccone
Vanessa Ray (2009–10)

Arthur Claybourne
Bill Tatum (1991–92)

Derek Coburn
Benton Greene (2008–09)

Steve Colby
Tim Hopper (2006)

Judge.

Louise Cole
Mary K. Wells (1958)

Dr. Tim Cole
William Redfield (1958)

Audrey Coleman
Lynn Herring (2009)

Mother of Henry, Eve, and Maddie Coleman.

Eve Coleman
Bonnie Root (2006)

Sister of Henry and Maddie Coleman. Serial killer.

Grant Coleman
Konrad Mattaei (1973–74)
James Douglas (1974–95)

Former husband of Lisa Grimaldi and Joyce Hughes.

Henry Coleman
Trent Dawson (1999–2010)

Son of Audrey Coleman and James Stenbeck. Formerly married to Katie Peretti and Vienna Hyatt. Married to Barbara Ryan.

Joyce Coleman
Barbara Rodell (1973–79; 1980–81)

Ex-wife of Grant Coleman and Donald Hughes. Mother of Teddy "Ryder" Hughes.

Maddie Coleman
Alexandra Chando (2005–07; 2009–10)
Kelli Barrett (2008–09)

Younger sister of Henry and Eve Coleman. Dated Casey Hughes.

Dorothy Connors
Nancy Pinkerton 1983–84

Regina Corrado
Priscilla Lopez (2003)

Zoe Crane
Aisha Henderson (1996)

Darryl Crawford
Rex Smith (1990–92)

Late husband of Frannie Hughes. Widower of Carolyn Crawford. Father of Dana Crawford.

Doug Cummings
John Wesley Shipp (1985–86)

Obsessive fan of Kim Sullivan Hughes. Briefly engaged to Frannie Hughes.

Molly Conlan
Lesli Kay (1997–2004, 2009–10)
Christina Chambers (2004)

== D ==
Joe D'Angelo
Tony Musante (2000–03)

Rose D'Angelo
Martha Byrne (2000–04; 2006)

Deceased daughter of Iva Snyder and Rod Landry. Twin sister of Lily Walsh. Mother of Jade Taylor. Killed by Will Munson.

Thelma Dailey
Jenny O'Hara (1992–93)

Heather Dalton
Tonya Pinkins (1983–86)

Walker Daniels
Real Andrews (2003–04)

Mick Dante
Tom Pelphrey (2009–10)

A medical researcher developing a youth serum who claims to be the deceased James Stenbeck.

Chaz Dargote
D. C. Benny (2006–07)

Jack Davis
Martin Sheen (1965–70)

Kevin Davis
Karl Girolamo (2005–09)

L.J. McDermott
Robert Hogan (1991–92)

Rick Decker
John James (2003–04; 2008)

Mentally unstable ex-husband of Dr. Susan Stewart.

Pam Dennison
Kate Hodge (2007)

Jack Devere
Darnell Williams (1994)

Andy Dixon
Jason Ferguson (1976–79)
Robert Dwyer (1980)
Alfe Smith (1982)
Sean Anthony (1983–84)
Scott DeFreitas (1985–95; 1997–2000)

Son of Kim Sullivan Hughes and John Dixon. Half-brother of Sabrina Hughes, Christopher Hughes, Margo Hughes, Duke Kramer, the late Johnny Dixon, and Matthew John Dixon. Ex-husband of Courtney Baxter. Father of Hope Dixon with Denise Maynard.

Hope Dixon
unknown actresses (1998-2001)

Denise Dixon
Cassandra Creech (1998–2001)

Duke Kramer Dixon
Michael Louden (1988–90; 1993)

John Dixon
Larry Bryggman (1969–2004; 2010)

Pilar Domingo
Roselyn Sanchez (1996–97)
Daniella Alonso (2004)

Ariel Aldrin Donovan
Judith Blazer (1982–85)

Burke Donovan
David Forsyth (1983)

Dustin "Dusty" Donovan
Brian Bloom (1983–88)
Grayson McCouch (2003–08; 2008–10)

Harvey Dugan
George R. Sheffey (2005)

Iris Dumbrowski
Terri Garber (2005–08; 2010)

Ada Dunne
Portia Reiners (2006)

Sofie Duran
Justine Cotsonas (2007–08)

== E ==
Dave Eagan
Ken Garito (1997)

Jules Earling
Stu Richel (2006)

Marty Egan
Don Scardino (1969–70)

Nels Andersson Einar
Perry Scott (1980–84)

Helen Eldridge
Anne Shropshire (1992)

John Eldridge
Michael Levin (1991–92)

Scott Eldridge
Joseph Breen (1992–93)
Christopher Cass (1993)
Doug Wert (1995–96)

Bruce Elliott
James Pritchett (1962)

Hank Elliott
Brian Starcher (1989–90)

Linda Elliott
Beverley Owen (1956)

Brian Ellison
Robert Hover (1975)

Kate Emerson
Rachael Kelly (1978–79)

Rob Emerson
Don Money (2007)

Claire English
Anne Burr (1956–59)
Gertrude Warner (1960)
Nancy Wickwire (1960–64)
Jone Allison (1964–65)
Barbara Berjer (1965–71)

Judy English
Sibyl Collier (1966)

Sierra Esteban
Finn Carter (1985–88; 1990; 1991; 1994)
Mary Beth Evans (2000–05; 2010)

Kathy Evans
Catherine Kellner (1987)

== F ==
Beau Farrell
Neil Maffin (1988–89)

Jim Fellows
Jonathan Roumie (2007)

Stu Ferguson
Jamey Sheridan (1986)

Annabelle Fettle
Phyllis Somerville (2004)

Zac Finn
Nicholas Galbraith (2009)

Zoe Finn
Melinda Sullivan (2009)

Ruby Fisk
Diane Perell (2008)

Adelaide Fitzgibbon
Susan Brown (1988)
Beverly Penberthy (1989)

Kit Fowler
Lauretta Vaughn (2007–08)

Sergio Francone
Robert Montano (2006)

Gabriel Frank
Nicholas Coster (2000–01)

Ruby Frank
Guenia Lemos (2000–01)

Roy Franklin
Count Stovall (1986–89)

Sarah Franklin
Novella Nelson (1989)

Simon Frasier
Paul Leyden (2000–03; 2004; 2006–07; 2009–10)

Carol Demming Frazier
Rita McLaughlin-Walter (1970–81)

Sara Fuller
Gloria DeHaven (1966–67)

== G ==
Emerson Gallagher
John Cunningham (1992–93)

Eliot Gerard
Ian Kahn (2007)

Kevin Gibson
Steven Weber (1985–86)

Simon Gilbey
Jerry Lacy (1971)

Dr. Gordo
Joe Holt (2003)

Melinda Gray Spencer
Ariana Munker (1978–80)

Bernard Ignatius Grayson
Brent Collins (1982–83)

B.J. Green
Brian Gaskill (2005)

Dallas Griffin
Duane McLaughlin (2006–07)
Kenneth Franklin (2007)
Wolé Parks (2007–08)

Lamar Griffin
Vince Williams (1989)
Michael Genet (1992–93)
Chris Walker (1995)

Jessica Griffin
Tamara Tunie (1987–95; 1999–2007; 2009)
Joanna Rhinehart (1995–99)

Damian Grimaldi, actor Jon Lindstrom was originally offered the role; he turned it down.
Paolo Seganti (1993–97; 2001; 2006; 2009–10)

Dante Grimaldi
Luca Calvani (2001)

Eduardo Grimaldi
Nicolas Coster (1993–95)

Lisa Grimaldi
Eileen Fulton (1960–64; 1966–83; 1984-2010)
Pamela King (1964)
Lynn Rogers (1977–78)
Betsy von Furstenberg (1983–84)
Jane Powell (1991; 1993–94)
Maeve McGuire (1992)
Carmen Duncan (2004)

Orlena Grimaldi
Claire Bloom (1994–95)
Lynn Milgrim (1995)

== H ==
Bennett Hadley
Doug Haggins (1979)

Cynthia Haines
Charissa Chamorro (2009–10)

Cynthia Haines
Linda Dano (1981–82)

Karen Haines
Kate McNeil (1981–84)

Meredith Halliday
Nina Hart (1970–71)

Jef Hamlin
Christopher C. Fuller (1994–96)

Rick Hamlin
Robert Vaughn (1995)

Alice Hammond
Imogene Coca (1983)

Ben Harris
Peter Parros (1996–2005; 2009)

Curtis Harris
Chad Tucker (2000–02)
Ernest Waddell (2003–05)

Annie Hasbrook
Hallee Hirsh (1996)

Rosalind Hatchley
Ina Balin (1986)

Graham Hawkins
Nick Ullett (1992–94)

Pat Holland Dixon
Melinda Peterson (1976–77)

Brad Hollister
Peter Brouwer (1980–81)

Eric Hollister
Peter Reckell (1980–82)

Hayley Wilson Hollister
Dana Delany (1981)

Amanda Holmes
Deborah Steinberg Soloman (1966–68; 1970)

Ann Holmes
Augusta Dabney (1966–67)

Bill Holmes
William Prince (1966–67)

Casey Hughes
Cruise Russo (1991–99)
Joseph Cross (1999–2002)
Ian Boyd (2004)
Peter Vack (2004)
Zach Roerig (2005–07)
Billy Magnussen (2008–10)

Christopher Hughes I
Don MacLaughlin (1956–86)

Christopher "Chris" Hughes II
Adam Hirshan (1987–90)
Evan Ross Cannata (1990–91)
Christian Siefert (1992–98)
Ben Jorgenson (1999)
Paul Korver (1999–2001)
Alan White (2002)
Bailey Chase (2003–05)
Dylan Bruce (2007–08)
Daniel Cosgrove (2010)

Daniel Hughes
Jared and Lindsey Baskin (1999–2001)
Dylan Bluestone (2001–06)
Kevin Csolak (2006)
Sam Stone (2007–08)

Donald "Don" Hughes
Hal Studer (1956)
Richard Holland (1956–62)
James Noble (1962)
Peter Brandon (1965–72)
Martin West (1976–78)
Conard Fowkes (1978–81; 1985–86; 1993; 1995)

Edith Hughes
Ruth Warrick (1956–60)

Frances "Frannie" Hughes
Kelly Campbell (1973)
Maura Gilligan (1975–79)
Tracy O'Neil (1980)
Melaney Candel (1982)
Helene Udy (1982–83)
Terri VandenBosch (1983–84)
Julianne Moore (1985–88, 2010)
Mary Ellen Stuart (1989–92)
Mary Kane (1991; temporary)

John Hughes
Laurence Hugo (1960s)

Kim Sullivan Hughes
Kathryn Hays (1972–2010)
Patty McCormack (1975–76; temporary)

Lien Hughes
Ming-Na (1988–91)
Lea Salonga (2001, 2003)

Margo Hughes
Margaret Colin (1981–83)
Hillary B. Smith (1983–89)
Ellen Dolan (1989–93; 1994–2010)
Glynnis O'Connor (1993–94)

Mary Ellison Hughes
Kelly Wood (1975–80; 1993)

Nancy Hughes
Helen Wagner (1956–2010)
Betty Runnell (1988–89)

Penny Hughes
Rosemary Prinz (1956–68, 1985–88, 1993, 1998, 2000–01)
Phoebe Dorin (1971)

Robert "Bob" Hughes
Bobby Alford (1956–58)
Ronnie Welch (1958–60)
Don Hastings (1960–2010)

Ryder Hughes
Kerr Smith (1996–97)

Sabrina Hughes
Julianne Moore (1986–88)
Claire Beckham (1990–92)

Thomas "Tom" Hughes
James Madden (1963)
Jerry Schaffer (1964)
Frankie Michaels (1965–66)
Richard Thomas (1966–67)
Paul O'Keefe (1967–68)
Peter Link (1969)
Peter Galman (1969–73)
C. David Colson (1973–78)
Tom Tammi (1979–80)
Justin Deas (1980–84)
Jason Kincaid (1984)
Gregg Marx (1984–87)
Scott Holmes (1987–2010)

William "Pa" Hughes
Will Lee (1956)
Santos Ortega (1956–76)

Aurora Hunter
Karen Ziemba (2009)

Lucy Hunter
Linda Cook (1981)

Hutch Hutchinson
Judson Mills (1991–93)

Woody Hutchinson
Dan Ziskie (1991–93)

Faux Hwa
C. S. Lee (2005)

Vienna Hyatt
Ewa Da Cruz (2006–10)

== J ==
Mason Jarvis
Forbes March (2009)

Roland Jefferies
Steve Cell (2002)

Ava Jenkins
Yancy Butler (2009)

Bonnie Jenkins
Caroline Aimetti (1993–96)
Chloe Morris (1996–99)
Napiera Danielle (2001–04)
Chauntee Schuler (2007–09)

Isaac Jenkins
Paul Taylor (1999–2003)

Kira Johnson
Lauryn Hill (1991)

Denise Jones
Holly Marie Combs (1991–94)

T. Jones
Wendy Jones (1996)

== K ==
Mark Kasnoff
Alexander Walters (1995–97)

Mike Kasnoff
Shawn Christian (1994–97)
Mark Collier (2002–07; 2009)
Jon Prescott (2008)

Nick Kasnoff
Jordan Woolley (2005–06)

Nora Kasnoff

Sarah Kasnoff
Lisa Lawrence (1996)

Laurie Keaton
Laurel Delmar (1978)

Dr. Alex Keith
Jon Cypher (1977–79)

Royce Keller
Terry Lester (1991–94)

Eli King
Marc Aden Gray (2005–06)

Marie Kovac
Mady Kaplan (1985)

Duke Kramer
Michael Louden (1989–91)

Jerry Kramer
Philip Kraus (1983)

Joe Kravitz
Abe Vigoda (1985)

Dr. Ross Kreeger
Damian Young (2006)

Gavin Kruger
Joris Stuyck (1990)
Mark Tymchyshyn (1990–92)

Deborah Kurley
Julie Lancaster (1997)

Adonis Kapsalis
Rex (2007)

== L ==
Lincoln "Linc" Lafferty
James Wlcek (1990–92)
Lonnie McCullough (1993)

Dana Lambert
Louise Roberts (1991–92)

Henry Lange
James Rebhorn (1988–91)

Corrine Lawrence
Patricia Gage (1986–88)

Bridget Lawson
Haviland Morris (2010)

Hayden Lawson
Sami Gayle (2009–10)

Sandy Lebo
Lori Hammel (2008)

Corinne Lee
Elaina Erika Davis (2000)

Thea Lena
Eleni Kiamos (1984)

Phillip Lester
Evan Ferrante (1988)

Mark Lewis
Biff Warren (1977–78)

Charlotte Lindsey
Susan Pratt (1999)

Julia Lindsey
Annie Parisse (1998–2002)

Brock Lombard
Gregory Beecroft (1989–90)

Phillip Lombard
David Cryer (1985)

Chicago Mafia boss.

Cheri Love
Robin Mattson (2007)

James "Jim" Lowell Jr.
Les Damon (1956–57)
William Johnstone (1956–79)

Tuan Ly
Russell Wong (1988)

Ann Lynch
Kaija Matiss (2005–06)

Tammy Lynn
Beth Glover (1999)

Louie Lyons
Rick Zahn (2005)

== M ==
Ruth Mansfield
Ann Flood (1992–93)

Ralph Manzo
Stuart Damon (2009–10)

Samantha Markham
Brooke Alexander (1994–96)
Sherri Alexander (1997–99)

Lydia Marlowe
Zsa Zsa Gabor (1981)

Miranda Marlowe
Elaine Princi (1981–83)

D. A. Dick Martin
Joe Maross (1966)
Edward Kemmer (1966–70, 1975–78)

Otto Martin
Allen Nourse (1966–68)

Derek Mason
Thomas Gibson (1988–89)

Mitzi Matters
Anne Sayre (2000–04)

Janice Maxwell
Holly Cate (1993–95)

Noah Mayer
Jake Silbermann (2007–10)
Patrick Kernan Quinn (2009)

Winston Mayer
Daniel Hugh Kelly (2007–09)

Denise Maynard
Cassandra Creech (1998–2001)

Dan McClosky
Dan Frazer (1985–96)

Police lieutenant.

Lewis McCloud
Marc Gomes (1997)
Monti Sharp (1997–98)

Brian McColl
Robert Burton (1982)
Frank Telfer (1982–84)
Mark Pinter (1984–86; voice)

Diana McColl
Kim Johnston Ulrich (1983–85)

Kirk McColl
Christian LeBlanc (1983–85)

Whitney McColl
Robert Horton (1982–84)

Larry J. McDermott
Ed Fry (1990–95; 2009)

Ian McFarland
Peter Simon (1979–80)

Roy McGuire
Konrad Matthaei (1966–68)

Beatrice McKechnie
Ashley Crow (1986–87)

Duncan McKechnie
Michael Swan (1986–95; 2001–02)

Jake McKinnon
Tom Eplin (1999–2002)

Bridget McKinnon
Megan Ferrara (2001–02)

Michelle McKinnon
Lauren Ferrara (2001–02)

Alma Miller
Joanna Roos (1960)
Ethel Remey (1963–77)
Dorothy Blackburn (1978)

Eric Mitchell
Farley Granger (1986–88)

Ralph Mitchell
Keith Charles (1977–79; 1988–94)

Stan Mitchum
Daniel Ahearn (2005)

Bryant Montgomery
Dennis Marotta (1987–90)
Todd Rotondi (2000–01)

Craig Montgomery
Scott Bryce (1982–90; 1993–94; 2007–08)
Hunt Block (2000–05)
Jeffrey Meek (2006–07)
Jon Lindstrom (2008–10)

Johnny Montgomery
Daniel Menake (2005–06)
Bailey Harkins (2008–10)

Lucy Montgomery
Amanda Seyfried (2000–01)
Peyton List (2001–05)
Spencer Grammer (2006)
Sarah Glendening (2008–10)

Julia Morrisey Larrabee
Sarah Brown (2004–05)

Keith Morrisey
Kin Shriner (2005–06)

Adam Munson
Philip Webster Smith IV (1988–89)
Michael Zderko (1989–95)
Harry Zittel (1996–98)
Craig Lawlor (1998–2002)
Matthew Morrison (2006)
Matt Cavenaugh (2006–07)
Tom Degnan (2009)

Hal Munson
Benjamin Hendrickson (1985–2006)
John Hilner (1994–95)
James Kiberd (2004)
Randolph Mantooth (2004–05)

Jennifer Munson
Michelle Ann Nemeh (1990–91)
Sara Garney (1992–93)
Brianne Sassone (1993–95)
Alexandra Herzog (1995–99)
Kim Onasch (1999–2002)
Jennifer Ferrin (2003–06)

Parker Munson
Justin Weiss (1999)
Cole Kachelhoffer (1999–2004)
Giovani Cimmino (2004–06)
Mick Hazen (2006–10)

Gwen Norbeck Munson
Jennifer Landon (2005–08; 2010)

Nikki Munson
Jordana Brewster (1995–98)
McKenzie Satterthwaite (2004)

Will Munson
John W. Pink, Jr. (1993–96)
Bryon Abadrabo (1996–99)
Brett Groneman (2000–04)
Jesse Lee Soffer (2004–08, 2010)

== N ==
Luis Navarro
Gilbert Cruz (1994)

Blythe Nelson
Shelley Conger (1990)

Elroy Nevens
Cliff Weissman (1992–93)

Cole Norbeck
Chris Heuisler (2007–08)

Jim Norman
James Broderick (1962)

Brad Norris
Marcus Diamond (1983)

== O ==
Matt O'Connor
Eric William Morris (2008–09)

Shannon O'Hara
Margaret Reed (1985–90; 1994–95)

Angus Oliver
James Rebhorn (2010)

Dr. Reid Oliver
Eric Sheffer Stevens (2010)

Celia Ortega
Alyssa Diaz (2005)

Rafael Ortega
A.J. Lamas (2004–05)
Michael Cardelle (2005)

Charlotte Overton
Julie Potter (1993–94)

== P ==
Karen Peters
Leslie Denniston (1977–78)

Gil Penn
Van Hughes (2006–07)

Casey Peretti
Bill Shanks (1986–90)

Katie Peretti
Cori Ann Hansen (1989–94)
Terri Colombino (1998–2010)

Lyla Peretti
Veleka Gray (1980)
Anne Sward (1980–93)
Lee Bryant (1985; temporary)

Neil Perkins
Michael Izquierdo (2008)

Anthony Peterson
Brad Schmidt (2002)

Steve Phillips
Patrick Boll (2006)

Delores Pierce
Valerie Perrine (1998–99)

Hester Pierce
Ann Stanchfield (1979)

Jamie Platt
David Norton (1978–79)

Tom Pope
Charles Baxter (1957–58)

Edith Prisk
Ronnie Farer (2007)

Tony Pugliese
Nick Adams (2010)

== Q ==
Peter Quinn
Danny Johnson (2006)

== R ==
Reenie
Amy Ryan (1990)

Richie
Gerald Anthony (2003)

Roseanne
Edie Adams (1982)

Dominic Ramsey
Chris Tardio (2004)

Joe Ramirez
Gary Perez (1995–2002)

Police detective.

Greg Ray
Nicholas Cortland (1985)

Coleman "Doc" Reese
D.J. Lockhart-Johnson (2004)

Rita Renfield
Barbara Garrick (1998–99)

Tonio Reyes
Peter Boynton (1986–91; 1992)

Ann Reynolds
Linda Cook (2007)

Casey Reynolds
Nicolette Goulet (1984)

Valerie Reynolds
Judith McConnell (1976–79)

Harold Rice
Peter McRobbie (2008)

Judge.

Lauren Roberts
Celeste Holm (1981)

Bethany Rose
Tovah Feldshuh (1994)

Cricket Montgomery Ross
Lisa Loring (1980–84)

Ernest "Ernie" Ross
Marshall Watson (1982–83)

William "Billy" Ross
Hunter Garner (2001–02)

Barbara Rusk
Lara Hillier (2009)

Barbara Ryan
Judi Rolin (Early 1970s)
Barbara Stranger (Early 1970s)
Donna Wandry (1971–72)
Colleen Zenk (1978–2010)

Paul Ryan
Danny Pintauro (1983–84)
Elden Ratliff (1984–85)
C.B. Barnes (1985–86)
Damon Scheller (1986)
Andrew Kavovit (1986–91)
John Howard (1996)
Scott Holroyd (2001–03)
Roger Howarth (2003–10)

Rosanna Ryan
Yvonne Perry (1992–99)
Cady McClain (2002–05, 2007–10)

Daughter of Alexander Cabot. Half-sister of Carly Tenney Snyder. Twice married and divorced Craig Montgomery and Paul Ryan. Widow of the late Jordan Sinclair. Illegal adopted mother of Cabot Sinclair.

Rick Ryan
Con Roche (1972–73, 1986–87)
Gary Hudson (1981)

== S ==
Diego Santana
Bronson Pickett (1996–97)

Elaine Schiller
Traci Godfrey (2005–08)

Nicholas Scudder
Carl T. Evans (2001–02)

Dr. Michael Shea
Jay Lanin (1966–68)
Roy Shuman (1968–70)

Tess Shelby
Parker Posey (1991–92)

Eddie Silva
Nathaniel Marston (1998–2000)
Frank J. Galasso (1998, flashback)

Debbie Simon
Sharon Case (1992–93)

Ned Simon
Frank Converse (1992–94)

Bud Simpson
Vasili Bogazianos (2004)

Jordan Sinclair
Chris Beetem (2004–05)

Ike Slattery
William Hickey (1983)

Aaron Snyder
Mason Boccardo (1991–95)
Unknown actor (1998)
Agim Kaba (2002–05, 2007–09)

Angel Snyder
Alice Haining (1988–94)

Brad Snyder
Nick Kokotakis (1998–99)
Roy Eudon (1999)
John Loprieno (1999)
Austin Peck (2007–09)

Caleb Snyder
Michael David Morrison (1988–93)
Graham Winton (1989 [temporarily]; 1993–95, 1998, 2001–02)

Ellie Snyder
Renee Props (1988–92)

Emma Snyder
Kathleen Widdoes (1985–2010)

Ethan Snyder
Brayden and Declan Schenck (2006–09)
Jason Bastelli (2009–10)

Faith Snyder
Keara Dolan (1998–2002)
Eliza Ryan (1998–2002)
Cassidy Hinkle (2002–06)
Ashley Marie Greiner (2006–09)
Valentina de Angelis (2010)

Holden Snyder
Jon Hensley (1985–88; 1990–95, 1997–2010)

Iva Snyder
Lisa Brown (1985–94, 1998, 2000–01, 2003)
Lisa Robbins (1992; temporary)

Jack Snyder
Michael Park (1997–2010)

Carly Snyder
Maura West (1995–2010)

Jacob Snyder
Unknown babies (2009–10)

Joseph James "J.J." Snyder
Dylan Denton (2004–06)
Daniel Manche (2006–08)

Josh Snyder/ Rod Landry
William Fichtner (1987–89, 1992–94)

Julie Snyder
Susan Marie Snyder (1989–95, 1998)

Lily Snyder
Lucy Deakins (1984–85)
Martha Byrne (1985–89, 1993–2008)
Heather Rattray (1989–93)
Noelle Beck (2008–10)

Luke Snyder
Spencer Goodnow (1995–96)
Sean Cohan (1996)
Jeremy Ian Zelig (1996–2001)
Christopher Tavani (2001–05)
Jake Weary (2005)
Van Hansis (2005–10)

Meg Snyder
Jennifer Ashe (1986–89, 1994)
Marie Wilson (2005–10)

Natalie Snyder
Milena Testa (2004–05)
Ellery Capshaw (2006–08)
Isabella Palmieri (2009–10)

Sage Snyder
Camryn Rose DeRoche (2003)
Bianca Pagona (2004)
Colleen Feehan (2004–05)
Elle Sauli (2006)
Allie Gorenc (2006–10)

Seth Snyder
Steve Bassett (1986–88, 1991–94, 2001, 2009)

Charley Spangler
James McCaffrey (2003)

Beau Spencer
Wayne Hudgins (1977–79)

Jane Spencer
Georgann Johnson (1977–79)

Gunnar St. Clair
Hugo Napier (1982–84)

Jay Stallings
Dennis Cooney (1973–80)
Shawn Campbell (1974)

David Stenbeck
Chris Browning (1997)
Daniel Markel (1997–98)
Keith Coulouris (1998–2000)

James Stenbeck
Anthony Herrera (1980–83, 1986–89, 1996–99, 2001–05, 2008–10)

Blake Stevens
Peter Francis James (1989–91)

Alison Stewart
Amy Princine (1994–2000)
Sarah Hyland (2001)
Jessica Dunphy (2002–05)
Marnie Schulenburg (2007–10)

Betsy Stewart
Tiberia Mitri (1970)
Maurine Trainer (1970)
Patricia McGuiness (1971)
Suzanne Davidson (1972–80)
Lisa Denton (1981–82)
Meg Ryan (1982–84)
Mary Kae (1984)
Lindsay Frost (1984–88)
Tracy Sallows (1991)
Jordan Baker (1994)
Jennifer Van Dyck (1996, voice))

Betty Jackson Stewart
Patricia Benoit (1960–62)

Carol Ann "Annie" Stewart
Jean Mazza (1969–70)
Barbara Jean Ehrhardt (1970–71)
Ariane Munker (1972–73)
Shelly Spurlock (1973–74)
Martina Deignan (1976–79)
Julie Ridley (1979–82)
Randall Edwards (1982)
Mary Lynn Blanks (1982–86, 1991)

Daniel "Dan" Stewart
Paul O'Keefe (1962–63)
Doug Chapin (1964)
Jeffrey Rowland (1965)
John Colenback (1966–73, 1976–79)
John Reilly (1974–76)

David Stewart
Ernest Graves (1960)
Henderson Forsythe (1960–90)

Dawn "Dee" Stewart
Simone Schachter (1971)
Jean Mazza (1972–73)
Glynnis O'Connor (1973)
Marcia McClain (1976–78)
Jacqueline Schultz (1979–82, 1985–86)
Heather Cunningham (1980, temporary)
Vicky Dawson (1982–83, 1991)

Ellen Lowell Cole Stewart
Wendy Drew (1956–60)
Patricia Bruder (1960–95, 1998)

Susan Stewart
Connie Scott (1966–67)
Diana Walker (1967)
Jada Rowland (1967–68)
Leslie Perkins (1968)
Marie Masters (1968–79, 1986–2010)
Judith Barcroft (1978, temporary)

Emily Stewart
Janine Sagan (1970s)
Pat Reynolds (mid-1970s)
Jenny Harris (1975–79)
Marissa Morell (1979)
Colleen McDermott (1986–87)
Melanie Smith (1987–91)
Kelley Menighan Hensley (1992–2010)

Cal Stricklyn
Patrick Tovatt (1988–98, 2001)

Jennifer Sullivan
Geraldine Court (1971–72)
Gillian Spencer (1972–75, 1997)

Dr. Al Suker
Michael Ingram (1964–66)

Helene Suker
Jerrianne Raphael (1964)

Martha Suker
Ann Hegira (1964)

== T ==
Elizabeth "Liz" Talbot Stewart
Jane House (1969–72)
Judith McGilligan (1972–73)

Marsha Talbot
Giulia Pagano (1986–87)

Ronnie Talbot
Curt Dawson (1973)

Brandy Taylor
Virginia Williams (2001–02)

Jade Taylor
Elena Goode (2006–07)
Davida Williams (2008–09)

Tea
Deborah Yates (2006–07)

Kevin Thompson
Michael Nader (1976–78)
Max Brown (1978)
John Cunningham (1978)

Sarah Travers
Joanna HartsHorne (2003–04)

T. Marshall Travers
Lamman Rucker (2002–03)

Natalie Triandos
Janet Zarish (1981)

Georgia Tucker
Jaime Nicole Dudney (1998–2000)

Marcus Tull
Bruce MacVittie (2007)

Janice Turner
Joyce Van Patten (1956–57)
Virginia Dwyer (1962)

Jerry Turner
James Earl Jones (1966)

Doctor.

Thelma Turner
Leona Powers (1956–57)

Malcolm Twist
John Bolton (1996)

Miss Tyler
Betty Garde (1957–59)

== V ==
Nicole Van Doren
Madga Wawrzyniak (1991)

Ella Vanderberg
Annie Heise (2009)

Gregory Varner
Mark Kevin Lewis (1993–94)

Dahlia Farrarr Ventura
Colleen Dion (2001–02)

Maurice Vermeil
David McCallum (1983)

Mark Vero
Lannon Killea (2008–09)

Angela Visconti
Liliana Komorowska (1988)

Franco Visconti
Ronald Guttman (1988)
Lee Godart (1990)

Gordon Voss
Adam Grupper (2007)

Doctor.

== W ==
Neil Wade
Michael Lipton (1962–67)

Pamela Wagner
Robin Morse (1987–89)

Tristan Wagner
Will Blagrove (2009)

Justin Walker
Charles Borland (2005)

Alec Wallace
Michael Woods (1999)

Connor Walsh
Allyson Rice-Taylor (1990–97)
Susan Batten (1997)

Evan Walsh III
Greg Watkins (1991–95)
Trent Bushey (1995; temporary)

Evan Walsh IV
Ryan Serhant (2007–08)

Lily Walsh
Lucy Deakins (1984–85)
Martha Byrne (1985–89, 1993–2008)
Heather Rattray (1989–93)
Noelle Beck (2008–10)

Lucinda Walsh
Elizabeth Hubbard (1984–2010)
Jessica Platell (1993; flashbacks)
Kate Anthony (1996; flashbacks)

Jeff Ward
Robert Lipton (1978–84; 1985; 1986)

Clark Watson
Gregory Michael (2003–04)

Rose Welinski
Lilia Skala (1985)

Sparky Wells
Ray Aranha (1995–97)

Pete Wendell
Jason Biggs (1994–95)

Don West
John Spencer (1988)

Brian Wheatley
Laurence Lau (2008–09)

Dawn Wheeler
Alexandra Neil (1993–95)

Jeremy Wheeler
John Dauer (1995–96)

Alice Whipple
Leslie Charleson (1966)

Silas Whitman
Christopher Durham (2009)

Congressman.

Stefan Wilder
James Burge (1976)

Abigail Williams
Emmy Rossum (1997)
Kristina Sisco (1999–2002; 2010)

Greta Williams
Anne Bobby (2004)

Social worker

Cassandra Willis
Elaina Erika Davis (2006–07)

Carl Wilson
Martin Rudy (1966–71)

Connie Wilson
Debbie McLeod (1981)

Martha Wilson
Anna Minot (1966–70)

Sandy Wilson
Dagne Crane (1966–71)
Jill Andre (1968)
Ronnie Carroll (1975)
Barbara Rucker (1975–79)

Stan Winchell
Estes Tarver (2009)

Edna Winklemeyer
Debra Jo Rupp (2008)

Cass Winthrop
Stephen Schnetzer (1999–2002; 2005; 2006)

Mackenzie Wong
Alice Lee (2009)

Sandra Wong
Linda Wang (1997–99)

Registered nurse.

== Y ==
Kano Yamamoto
James Saito (2006)

Mori Yamamoto
Mariko Takai (2006)

Sam Yee
Aki Aleong (1981)

Doctor.
