= Johnny Montgomery =

- As the World Turns character
- Portrayed by: Danil Menake (2005–06); Bailey Harkins (2008–10)
- Duration: 2005–06, 2008–10
- First appearance: July 12, 2005
- Last appearance: September 16, 2010
In-universe information
- Other names: Rory Cabot; Billy Norbeck; Johnny Munson; Craig Montgomery Jr. John Dustin Donovan; John Dustin Montgomery
- Occupation: Student
- Father: Craig Montgomery
- Mother: Jennifer Munson Donovan
- Adoptive father: Dusty Donovan
- Stepmother: Rosanna Cabot
- Half-brothers: Bryant Montgomery; Gabriel Caras
- Half-sisters: Lucy Montgomery
- Grandfathers: Bart Montgomery; Darryl Crawford; Hal Munson (adoptive)
- Grandmothers: Lyla Crawford; Barbara Ryan
- Uncles: Paul Ryan; Will Munson; Johnny Dixon; Adam Munson (adoptive); Parker Snyder (adoptive)
- Aunts: Margo Montgomery Hughes; Cricket Montgomery; Katie Peretti; Carrie Crawford; Nikki Munson (adoptive)
- First cousins: Adam Munson; Casey Hughes; Billy Ross; Suzie Ross; Jennifer Ryan; Eliza Ryan; Hallie Munson (adoptive)

John Dustin "Johnny" Montgomery (also Kasnoff, Munson and Donovan) is a fictional character in the daytime soap opera, As the World Turns. He is the only son of Jennifer Munson Donovan. He is the son of Craig Montgomery but was adopted by Dusty Donovan. He was kidnapped by his paternal half-sister, Lucy. Lucy and Johnny returned to the show in December 2008. Craig regained full custody of Johnny in January 2009 and had his son's surname changed legally from Donovan to Montgomery. He lives with Craig Montgomery and Rosanna Cabot in Oakdale, Illinois.

== Casting ==
From July 2005 to December 2006 the character was played by Danil Menake. Subsequently, Bailey Harkins played the character (December 2008 to 16 September 2010).

== Story ==
When Jennifer Munson went into labor and gave birth, she was later told that her baby had "died" that night. She arranged a memorial service where she revealed the name of her "deceased" son; Johnny, after her half brother who died after his birth as well and Dustin, after Dusty Donovan, who helped Jennifer deliver her baby. In the months after, Jennifer had a rough time running into her brother Will and his girlfriend Gwen, who also had a baby at the same day as Jen did. Jennifer felt a strong connection to the child and was more than once convinced that their babies were switched at the hospital, which means that Gwen's son Rory, who is being raised by Jack and Carly, is actually Johnny. A DNA test was done and the results showed that Rory was not Jennifer's son. She was heartbroken and became an addict to crystal meth and eventually was committed to a mental institution.

However, during this time, she was sure, more than ever, that Rory was her son and she begged her business partner and good friend Dusty to find things out. Another DNA test was done, and again, it showed that Rory was Gwen's, not Jennifer's. Jennifer broke down again, but she was able to stay away from the drugs this time. A few weeks later, Meg Snyder discovered that something was wrong with Rory's blood group. It didn't match Gwen's blood group, which should be impossible. She went out on research and soon found out that Rory was in fact Jennifer's son.

Jennifer was right; the babies were switched at the hospital, by Craig Montgomery, the father of Johnny, who was cut off from his son before he was even born. This was his revenge. While Gwen broke down by the devastating news that her son died months ago, Jennifer was reunited with her little boy. However, the story wasn't over yet. Dusty soon discovered that Meg's heroic action wasn't heroic at all. He finds out that she had visited the DNA Lab a few times, weeks ago, so he makes an appointment with one of the lab workers. The worker tells Dusty that Meg knew about this for a very long time. Dusty is furious and breaks up with Meg, only to start a relationship with Jennifer with whom he had fallen in love.

Johnny then finally begins a peaceful life with his real mother and is not taken away by anyone. Unfortunately, 6 months later, Johnny is diagnosed with a rare type of blood cancer and is admitted to the hospital. Thanks to Emily Stewart, Johnny has a blood transfusion and is cured. A few weeks later, Jennifer falls ill. She goes to the hospital where she hears she has pneumonia. However, she refuses to stay at the hospital and wants to go be with her son. That was a fatal mistake, proven when she collapses that same night. She is rushed to the hospital, where it becomes clear that her disease had infected her heart and cannot be cured anymore. Jennifer realizes she will die and asks Dusty to marry her now instead of later like they had planned. At her deathbed they say "I do" and she sings a lullaby to Johnny. After an imaginary dance, Jennifer dies in Dusty's arms.

Dusty suddenly has to take care of Johnny all by himself. Before Jennifer died, he adopted the boy because he had asked Jennifer to marry him. Lucy Montgomery, Johnny's biological sister, wants to help Dusty, despite the fact that he blames her for the death of his wife. Soon, Dusty realizes that he can't keep blaming Lucy for something that was not her fault, so he forgives her and the two become friends. A few weeks later, Dusty has to leave for business and leaves Johnny in the care of his mother-in-law Barbara. That night, Johnny falls ill so Barbara calls the hospital. Lucy answers and rushes to Barbara's penthouse. Barbara wants to wait for an ambulance, but Lucy says that it will never happen since an ice storm is blowing over Oakdale. While Barbara tries to call anyway, Lucy grabs Johnny and takes off with her car, on the way to the hospital. Her car breaks down so she has to get out. She realizes it is too dangerous, but an unknown man with a mask saves her and demands her to go.

She loses her way due to snow and heavy winds, but is eventually saved by Dusty, who decided to miss his plane so he can be with Johnny. They make it to the hospital, where Lucy almost collapses due to undercooling. Dusty realizes that she would sacrifice her life to save Johnny and the two become closer. Lucy overhears that the man who saved her life was taken to the hospital, so she decides to visit him. She is surprised to find out that it was her father Craig Montgomery, who was just released from jail. Dusty is outraged when he hears that Craig is making plans to get custody over Johnny. Dusty swears that Craig will never get his son and Lucy stands by Dusty's side. They decide to get Craig arrested for kidnapping Lucy two years earlier. However, in court, Craig blackmails Lucy by saying that if she tells the truth, awful things might happen to Dusty. Scared that Craig will hurt him, she tells the judge that she doesn't know for sure that it was Craig who kidnapped her. This angers Dusty. From that point on, the relationship between her and Dusty cools off and eventually she realizes that the fight over Johnny will last forever. She packs her bag and takes off with Johnny, to let him live happily and freely.

In December 2008, Johnny returns to Oakdale with Lucy, and now he is almost five years old. Johnny has a rare blood disease and he is in desperate need of a bone marrow transplant. Lucy, not wanting the residents of Oakdale, specifically Craig and Dusty, to know that she and Johnny are back, enlists the help of Alison Stewart to test Johnny's relatives and see if any of them are a match for the bone marrow transplant. Dusty eventually finds out his adopted son is back in Oakdale. Katie Peretti is revealed to be a match for Johnny's transplant.

Johnny is involved with the custody battle between his biological father and adoptive father. Johnny is awarded custody to his biological father, Craig. Meanwhile, Dusty promises him that they will be back together soon. Lucy has since started a mission for kids in east Africa, which involved smuggling cargo. When Fredo, her medical dealer finds out, he demands $50,000 for his silence. Dusty gets him to keep quiet, but a few days later, the dockworker found guns in one of the crates Lucy was going to send to Africa. Dusty is furious at first, but then realizes Fredo did this. Dusty tells the dockworker to empty the guns from the crate, but while doing so, he is murdered. Because the crate the guns were in was for Craig & Carly's designer vodka company, they are taken in for questioning. Carly is free to go, but Craig is arrested and accused of the crimes. Dusty uses this as a golden opportunity to get Johnny back. Dusty talks to his Lawyer, Tom Hughes, who tells Dusty that with Craig's arrest for crimes this serious, he could arrange a custody hearing for Dusty, and that Dusty could regain full custody of Johnny, all by the end of the day. And sure enough, with Craig in jail, without bail, unable to do anything about it, Dusty was awarded full custody of Johnny back before the day was over.
