= Meg Snyder =

- As the World Turns character
- Marie Wilson as Meg Snyder
- Portrayed by: Jennifer Ashe (1986–1994); Marie Wilson (2005–2010)
- Duration: 1986–1989; 1991–1994; 2005–2010
- First appearance: January 11, 1986
- Last appearance: June 29, 2010
- Created by: Douglas Marland
- Introduced by: Robert Calhoun
In-universe information
- Occupation: Nurse; Businessperson; Waitress
- Parents: Harvey Snyder; Emma Snyder
- Siblings: Seth Snyder; Iva Snyder Benedict (adoptive); Ellie Snyder; Caleb Snyder; Holden Snyder
- Spouse: Tonio Reyes (1987–1988); Josh Stricklyn (1989–2005); Craig Montgomery (2007–2008); Paul Ryan (2008–2009)
- Children: Eliza Ryan

Margaret "Meg" Snyder (previously Reyes, Stricklyn, Montgomery, and Ryan) is a character on the CBS daytime soap opera As the World Turns. Meg is known as the grown daughter of the Snyder family, a central family in the fictional town of Oakdale. She was portrayed by Port Charles actress Marie Wilson from 2005 to 2010.

== Casting ==
Actress Jennifer Ashe was cast in the role of Meg Snyder, portraying Snyder from January 1986 until November 1989, when Ashe left the show. Ashe went on to reprise the role in June 1991, December 1992, and January 1993. Ashe returned for one final guest run from June 14 to June 21, 1994.

In April 2005, it was announced that former Port Charles actress Marie Wilson was cast to bring the character of Meg back to the series after an eleven-year absence. Wilson debuted in the role on June 16, 2005.

In April 2010, following the cancellation of the series, it was announced that Wilson would exit the series prior to its September 2010 finale. Wilson's last portrayal of Meg Snyder aired on June 29, 2010. Following her departure, Wilson joined the online web series The Bay as Isabella Ahmed.

== Storylines ==
Meg Snyder is the daughter of Emma and Harvey Snyder. She is the sister of Seth Snyder, Iva Snyder Benedict, Caleb Snyder, Elinor "Ellie" Snyder, and Holden Snyder. She was involved with Dusty Donovan in the early years and even faked a pregnancy to trap him. Meg married Tonio Reyes but had an affair with Josh Stricklyn and became pregnant. She had a miscarriage after falling down a flight of stairs. She later married Josh, and they left town.

She returned to Oakdale in 2005 after eleven years and began working as a nurse at Memorial Hospital. It was revealed that she and Josh had since gotten divorced and she picked up her old relationship with Dusty until it was clear to her that he was in love with Jennifer Munson. Meg had planned to leave Oakdale but instead found Paul Ryan in the woods, badly injured from a gunshot wound. Since he was a fugitive, she took him secretly to an abandoned cabin, treated his wounds as a nurse, and took care of him until he was healed. The two fell in love and later became engaged.

Craig Montgomery was released from jail for his role in switching the babies of Jennifer and Gwen Norbeck Munson, and he set his eyes on Meg. She eventually left Paul at the altar and slept with Craig after losing her job as a nurse from causing a patient's death due to negligence. She married Craig to regain control of Worldwide Industries and restore the company to its original owner, Lucinda Walsh. Paul and Meg planned to leave Oakdale as soon as Lucinda had the company, but Craig found out and took Meg on a honeymoon. Craig then drugged Meg and let Paul fall off a cliff during a fight with Craig. When Paul was assumed dead, Meg continued her marriage with Craig, moving on. When Paul appeared alive and returned with Craig's ex-wife, Rosanna Cabot, the two agreed to continue with their separate lives. Meg then discovered she was pregnant, but having slept with both Craig and Paul, she was unsure of who the father could be. While Paul and Craig were fighting, Meg attempted to break up the fight. Paul, as a result, pushed Meg accidentally, causing her to miscarry. Meg later divorced Craig as Rosanna fell back into her comatose state. In the divorce decree, she returned Worldwide Industries to Lucinda.

In July 2008, Meg finally married Paul, though in a hospital bed, after being admitted for psychotic episodes brought on by fatigue. After marrying, Meg discovered she was once again pregnant with Paul's child. After finding out that Paul hired a Jennifer lookalike to seduce and distract Dusty, Meg asked for a divorce. A ghostly James Stenbeck convinced Paul to fake an overdose to get her back. Meg, having found a suicide note, went to the cabin they shared when she nursed him back to health and found Paul having overdosed in the chair. After trying to resuscitate him and get him to the car, she went into labor. She called Dusty, and he took her to the hospital where she delivered a healthy baby whom she named Eliza. Paul subsequently agreed to Meg's divorce. Dusty then learned that Craig had plans to marry Carly Tenney Snyder in an attempt to take Johnny away from him by proving he had a more stable family. To retaliate, Dusty proposed to Meg, which she accepted to help Dusty. The marriage was soon considered invalid.

Meg was committed to Deerbrook Mental Hospital due to an account by Damian Grimaldi, who made the rejected Meg believe he was leaving Lily for her. Damian later paid a man to turn off the cameras at Deerbrook, told Meg he loved her and was leaving Lily, and paid a doctor to tamper with Meg's medications to keep her unstable.

Upon escaping from Deerbrook with the help of Paul and his wife, Emily Stewart, Meg goes to find Damian to kill him for keeping her committed. During their struggle, Damian strangled Meg, and she fell to the floor. Meanwhile, Lily came back to argue about leaving again with Damian. Months later, following Eliza's christening, Paul agreed to let Meg move back into Fairwinds despite Emily's objections. Meg's delusions continued as she drugged herself with methadone to gain Paul's attention. When left alone, Meg shot Emily with a gun filled with blanks. She was then admitted to Memorial under psychiatric care. Paul gently encouraged her to receive the treatment that she needed. Though he assured her that a part of him would always love her, he could not follow her on her journey to recovery; she had to push herself to get better for Eliza's sake. Coming to terms with her drug-induced illness and the toxicity of her relationship with Paul, Meg agreed to go with Emma to a treatment facility in Washington, D.C. Meg left Memorial with confidence, with her mother and brother Holden by her side.
