= Peter Haskell =

American actor (1934–2010)

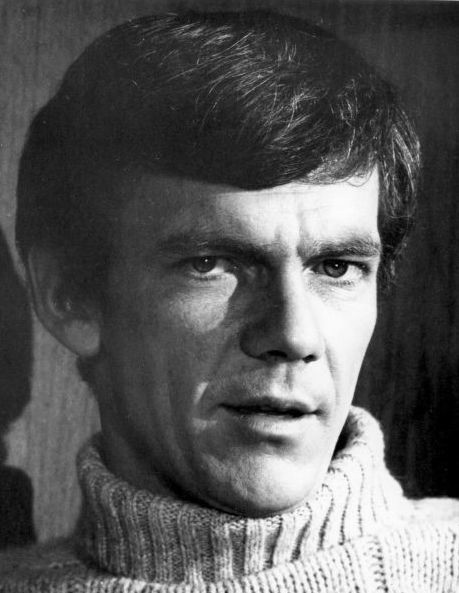
- Haskell in 1969
- Born: October 15, 1934; Boston, Massachusetts, United States
- Died: April 12, 2010 (aged 75); Northridge, California, United States
- Occupation: Actor
- Years active: 1963–2009
- Spouses: Annie Compton (1960–1974); Dianne Tolmich (1974–2010)
- Children: 2

Peter Haskell (October 15, 1934 – April 12, 2010) was an American actor who worked primarily in television.

== Early years ==
Haskell attended Browne & Nichols and later earned a Bachelor of Arts degree at Harvard University following a two-year stint in the United States Army where he rose to the rank of Private First Class. His plan to study at Columbia Law School was derailed when he was cast in the off-Broadway play The Love Nest, with James Earl Jones and Sally Kirkland.

Guest appearances followed on The Outer Limits; Twelve O'Clock High; Dr. Kildare; Combat!; The Man from U.N.C.L.E.; Ben Casey; The Fugitive; The F.B.I.; Land of the Giants; The Mary Tyler Moore Show; The Big Valley; Mannix; Medical Center; The Streets of San Francisco; Barnaby Jones; Cannon; Vega$; B. J. and the Bear; Hawaii Five-O; Charlie's Angels; The A-Team; Hunter; Matlock; Booker; Bracken's World; Frasier; Columbo: Caution: Murder Can Be Hazardous to Your Health; JAG; The Closer; MacGyver; Murder, She Wrote; and Cold Case. He was a regular on the daytime soap operas Search for Tomorrow and Ryan's Hope.

He had recurring roles in Garrison's Gorillas and Rich Man, Poor Man Book II, and was featured in TV movies, such as The Eyes of Charles Sand (1972), The Phantom of Hollywood (1974), The Night They Took Miss Beautiful (1977), Superdome (1978), Mandrake (1979), Shadow of Fear (1979), and The Cracker Factory (1979). Film appearances include Mary Ellen Bute's experimental film Passages from James Joyce's Finnegans Wake (1965),he title role in The Legend of Earl Durand (1974), Riding the Edge (1989), and Robot Wars (1993), although he may be best-known as Mr. Sullivan, the CEO of Playpals Toys, in David Kirschner's Child's Play 2 (1990) and Child's Play 3 (1991).

== Personal life ==
Haskell circa 1990

Haskell was married to Annie Compton from 1960 until their 1974 divorce. In 1974, he married Hollywood talent agent Dianne "Crickett" Tolmich, with whom he had a son and a daughter (Jason and Audra).
