= Mandrake (1979 film) =

- Genre: Thriller
- Based on: Mandrake the Magician by Lee Falk
- Written by: Rick Husky
- Directed by: Harry Falk
- Starring: Anthony Herrera; Simone Griffeth; Ji-Tu Cumbuka; Gretchen Corbett; Peter Haskell; Robert Reed
- Country of origin: United States
- Original language: English

Production
- Producer: Rick Husky
- Cinematography: Vincent A. Martinelli
- Editors: Frederic L. Knudtson; Edward W. Williams
- Running time: 100 minutes

Original release
- Network: NBC
- Release: January 24, 1979

Mandrake is a 1979 American television thriller film directed by Harry Falk and starring Anthony Herrera, Simone Griffeth, Ji-Tu Cumbuka, Gretchen Corbett, Peter Haskell, and Robert Reed. Based on the comic strip Mandrake the Magician, the film follows a magician attempting to help an amusement park owner who is being blackmailed by a psychopath who is murdering guests.

== Premise ==
The film follows Mandrake, a magician, and his assistant Lothar, who attempt to help an amusement park proprietor being blackmailed by a psychopath who is murdering the park's customers.

== Cast ==
- Anthony Herrera as Mandrake
  - David Hollander as Young Mandrake
- Simone Griffeth as Stacy
- Ji-Tu Cumbuka as Lothar
- Hank Brandt as Alec Gordon
- Gretchen Corbett as Jennifer Lindsay
- Peter Haskell as William Romero
- Robert Reed as Arkadian
- David Hooks as Dr. Malcolm Lindsay
- Harry Blackstone Jr. as Dr. Nolan
- James Hong as Theron
- Sab Shimono as Ho
- Donna Kei Benz as Cindy

== Release ==
=== Critical response ===
Tom Buckley of The New York Times panned the film, writing that "Rick Husky's script for this Universal Television presentation is a compilation of cliches. Harry Falks's direction is plodding. However, viewers can try a magic trick of their own. By turning the dial, they can make Mandrake disappear".
