= Earl Durand =

American outlaw

Walter Earl Durand (January 9, 1913 – March 24, 1939) was an American from Wyoming who became known as an outlaw after he escaped from jail. He killed a total of four officers in the course of resisting capture, two at his house, and two who tried to apprehend him during an 11-day manhunt in the Beartooth Mountains (near the mouth of Clarks Fork Canyon) of Wyoming.

== Early life and education ==
Walter Earl Durand was born in 1913 to parents who were farmers in Powell, Wyoming, where he grew up. He learned all about farming and hunting.

== Mountain man ==
Durand was a mountain man who lived off the land in the mountains of Wyoming during the years following the Great Depression. He was arrested for poaching elk, as he did not believe in the new hunting license system and refused to get a license.

While in jail in Cody, Wyoming, Durand escaped by taking a Deputy sheriff/Jailer's gun and forcing the officer to drive him into the countryside before he returned to his home. Durand shot and killed two police officers who came to his house to take him back to jail; then he armed himself and headed into the wilderness of the Beartooth Mountains.

The prosecutor initially deputized 10 men to form a posse to find and bring Durand in for trial. Durand shot and killed two of the possemen who were searching for him. The manhunt grew to include the FBI, sharp shooters, the Wyoming National Guard with artillery from Fort Warren, civilians, and an airplane fitted with tear gas and dynamite bombs.

During the manhunt, Durand eluded the pursuers for several days. He car-jacked a vehicle and drove it to Powell, where he attempted to rob a bank. He spent several minutes shooting at the windows and walls of the bank. Durand took several hostages, one of whom was killed by a citizen trying to shoot and take down Durand as they left the bank. After being shot by Tip Cox, Durand crawled back into the bank; there he killed himself with a shot to the neck.

== Representation in other media ==
The 11-day manhunt was widely covered by the national press, with Durand being nicknamed "Tarzan of the Tetons". Inspired by the manhunt, the film Wyoming Outlaw was rapidly produced: the B movie starring John Wayne appeared in theaters 3 months after Durand's death. Durand was later portrayed by Peter Haskell in a Hollywood biopic, The Legend of Earl Durand (1974). Singer/songwriter Charlie Brown's "The Ballad of Earl Durand", from his 1967 album Teton Tea Party, was included on The Best of Broadside 1962-1988.
