= Jennifer Munson Donovan =

- As the World Turns character
- Jennifer Ferrin as Jennifer Munson
- Portrayed by: Michelle Ann Nemeh (1990–91); Sara Garney (1992–93); Brianne Sassone (1993–95); Alexandra Herzog (1995–99); Kim Onasch (1999–2002); Jennifer Ferrin (2003–06)
- Duration: 1990–2006
- First appearance: October 29, 1990
- Last appearance: July 14, 2006
- Created by: Douglas Marland
- Introduced by: Laurence Caso
In-universe information
- Occupation: Designer for "Street Jeans"; Former Model for BRO
- Parents: Darryl Crawford; Barbara Ryan
- Adoptive parents: Hal Munson
- Siblings: Paul Ryan; Will Munson; Johnny Dixon; Carrie Crawford; Nikki Munson (adoptive); Adam Munson (adoptive); Parker Munson (adoptive)
- Spouse: Mike Kasnoff (2005–06); Dusty Donovan (2006)
- Children: Johnny Montgomery
- Grandparents: Reverend Crawford; Harold Munson (adoptive); Louise Munson (adoptive); Chuck Ryan; Jennifer Hughes
- Aunts and uncles: Claire Shelby (adoptive); Rick Ryan; Melinda Grey; Frannie Hughes
- Nieces and nephews: Eliza Ryan; Hallie Munson (adoptive); Jennifer Ryan
- First cousins: Tess Shelby (adoptive); Cassie Shelby (adoptive); Becky Shelby (adoptive); Davey Shelby (adoptive); Ben Shelby Jr. (adoptive)
- Other relatives: Frances Sullivan; Kim Sullivan Hughes; Sabrina Hughes; Andy Dixon; Chris Hughes; Hope Dixon

Jennifer Munson is a fictional character on the CBS soap opera As the World Turns. The character was the daughter of late police chief, Hal Munson, and fashion designer, Barbara Ryan. She was born on-screen on October 29, 1990, and died on-screen on July 7, 2006, of cardiovascular myopathy brought on by a pneumonic infection.

The role was portrayed by Jennifer Ferrin at the time of the character's death. She received two Daytime Emmy nominations in 2005 and 2006 for "Outstanding Younger Actress" and "Outstanding Supporting Actress" respectively.

== Storylines ==
Jennifer Louise Munson is born on October 29, 1990, to Barbara Ryan and Darryl Crawford but is adopted by Hal Munson. Her birth date is later revised to 1983 after she is aged to 16 years old in 1999.

Mike and Jennifer meet through mutual friends. Her sister, Nikki, had a crush on Mike and his friend, Henry, had a crush on Nikki. One day, Mike was fixing a pipe that broke in Jen's office. He ripped his jeans, and Jennifer decided that she would make a design out of them. With Mike as her inspiration, she decided to start her own design company called "Street Jeans". Mike and Jen started spending time together as he was modeling her clothes. They decided to embark on a relationship but when Mike's ex-girlfriend, Katie Peretti, came back into town, it was obvious that Katie and Mike still had feelings for one another.

Though Mike had feelings for Katie, he insisted that he was in love with Jennifer. On the night of a party for Jen's company, Mike didn't show up. Jen knew that he was with Katie. After the party, thinking that she and Mike were breaking up, Jen got drunk and slept with Craig Montgomery. Jen felt horrible about what she'd done, and confessed all to Mike. He forgave her. Then, Jen found out that not only was she pregnant, but it wasn't Mike's baby. Mike suggested that they get married, and that he would raise that baby as his own.

Tensions rose soon after as Craig Montgomery insisted on being a part of the child's life. Jennifer, knowing Craig and his history, was determined to keep him out of her child's life. She decided to set Craig up to make it look like he pushed her down. Her plan worked. The court decided that Craig could not be near the child for five years. Mike, who wanted a peaceful resolution, was angry when he found out what Jen had done. He left her and went to a hotel where Katie just happened to be staying. They ended up making love and admitting that they still loved one another. Jen found Mike with Katie and tried to convince him that they could make their marriage work but Mike told her that their marriage was over.

Jennifer first met significantly older man, Dusty when she first came back to Oakdale from Europe. She at first flirted with him as a way of getting him away from Rose, Jen's brother Paul's former girlfriend. While Jennifer and Dusty were attracted to one another, they didn't like each other. Dusty stayed with Rose, and Jen moved on.

Years later, business would bring them back into each other's lives. With Jen building her new company, Street Jeans, the company became a subsidiary of Lucinda Walsh's World Wide where Dusty worked. Not getting along at first, they eventually found common ground against a common enemy in Craig Montgomery. After having a one-night stand with Craig, Jennifer found herself pregnant. But Jennifer, knowing the type of father that Craig was, didn't want him in her baby's life. Jennifer married her boyfriend at the time (Mike Kasnoff) and decided to raise the baby as his. To make this happen, Jen and Dusty set Craig up. As a result, there was a restraining order against Craig until the baby turned five.

Having found out what Jennifer and Dusty did, Mike left her. Upset over the breakup, Jen went to her mother's cabin. She fell off of a chair and went into premature labor. Dusty found her there and helped her give birth to her son. But at the hospital, Jen's baby died. With Dusty delivering her son, Jen and Dusty formed a bond and friendship. At her son's funeral, it was revealed that she named him, John Dustin Kasnoff. For months, Dusty was there for Jen. He helped her through the pain of losing her child, her drug addiction and believed in her when she insisted that her son was still alive. Their friendship turned into love, but neither admitted it. After not being able to prove that her son was alive, Jen pushed Dusty away. Having been rejected by Jennifer, Dusty went back to former girlfriend, Meg Snyder. Meg knew that Jen's baby was alive but kept it a secret to keep Dusty with her.

When her guilt got the best of her, Meg made it so that Dusty would figure out the truth without having anyone discover her part in it. Dusty got John Dustin (Johnny) back for Jen and their bond became even stronger. But Dusty remained with Meg. When Dusty discovered Meg's part in the deception, he left her and immediately went back to Jennifer. Not too long after Jennifer and Dusty started dating, Dusty was presumed dead. Like when her son was presumed dead, Jennifer didn't believe it. She didn't feel that Dusty was dead. Her brother, Paul claimed to have killed him during a fight they had but Paul was lying. Paul thought that his new love, Meg killed Dusty. But when he discovered that she didn't, he also realized that his former girlfriend, Emily Stewart might have. Emily didn't actually kill Dusty. She was holding him hostage.

After getting a note from Dusty, she was determined to find him. She got her brother out of jail and followed Emily into the woods. There, she found Dusty. With that crisis over, Dusty asked Jen to marry him. She accepted his proposal, and he adopted her son. Not long after the adoption went through, Johnny fell ill. But with the help of Dusty's kidnapper, Emily, he got better. Then Jen contracted pneumonia while looking over Johnny. Her disease got worse and turned into something deadly. Knowing her fate, Jen asked Dusty to marry her now instead of later. Not too long after the wedding, she died in his arms. With Emily being on trial for Dusty's kidnapping, Jen came to Dusty in a vision. She told him to let Emily go free, because she saved their son. Dusty, not wanting to disappoint his late wife, did as she wanted.

Jennifer gave birth to a son prematurely and at the same time as Gwen Norbeck. Craig, along with his wife Rosanna Cabot, made plans to adopt Gwen's baby. Realizing the opportunity, Craig switched his and Jennifer's son and Gwen's son while the babies were in the hospital nursery. This way, Rosanna and himself could raise his biological son. Gwen's baby, unfortunately, died and Jennifer was told that it was her son that died. Rosanna found out what Craig had done and was horrified. On the way to expose Craig, Rosanna's car was run off the road. Craig was revealed to have caused the accident and was sent to jail, while Rosanna slipped into a coma. She tried to tell her ex-husband, Paul Ryan, about the switch, able to only say the word "Wrong foot" before falling into the coma. Rosanna was sent to a hospital in Switzerland and Paul was left to figure out what she had tried to tell him.

Jennifer was distraught over the "death" of her son. She eventually became addicted to crystal meth. Dusty Donovan and Meg Snyder realized Jennifer's addiction and got her help. Jennifer eventually fell in love with Dusty, and she told him that she believed her son was still alive. Dusty was able to find enough information that confirmed that Gwen's baby was born the same day as Jennifer's, meaning Billy (Gwen's son) could be Jennifer's. A DNA test confirmed this, and baby "Billy" was returned to his rightful mother. Jennifer gave her son the name John Dustin Munson, after her deceased half-brother John, and Dusty, who had done so much for her.

Johnny was diagnosed with a rare form of blood cancer, but was able to go into remission because of stem cells given from Emily Stewart, who was pregnant with Paul's baby and Johnny's cousin. On the day that Johnny was set to be released from the hospital, Jennifer fell ill herself and was diagnosed with viral pneumonia. Despite pleas from her doctors to stay in the hospital, Jennifer was adamant about going home to be with her son, and left the hospital when Lucy Montgomery told her of her right to leave against doctor's orders. Leaving the hospital proved to be fatal for Jennifer, and she collapsed the same night. She was rushed back to the hospital, where it was discovered that the pneumonia had caused irreparable damage to Jennifer's heart. Dusty tried to convince Jennifer (and himself) that she would recover, but Jennifer realized the truth. Jennifer asked Dusty to marry her, and he did, in her hospital room, surrounded by her family. On July 7, 2006, after an imaginary dance with Dusty and still in his arms, Jennifer dies of cardio myopathy brought on by the viral pneumonia.

== Family ==
Jennifer's biological parents have never married and she thus had numerous stepparents in her life though she was raised primarily by Barbara. Hal would later adopt her, and she came to know him as her only father.

Jennifer had eight half-siblings during her life: Carrie Crawford, Nikki Munson, Adam Hughes Munson, Will Munson, Parker Munson, Paul Ryan and Johnny Dixon. She was very close to Paul and Will in particular.

Jennifer was also sister-in-law to Gwen Norbeck Munson and half-aunt to Jennifer Ryan, her namesake. She was stillborn though her stem cells ultimately saved Johnny's life when he was diagnosed with cancer.

=== Marriages, motherhood and significant relationships ===
Jennifer was married twice and at the time of her death, she was married to Dusty Donovan. Dusty also adopted her son, John Dustin "Johnny" Donovan, before she died. Jennifer died in Dusty's arms after he gave her an imaginary wedding dance in her deathbed. She later appeared in one of Dusty's dreams urging him to let go of his grief and move on for her and their son's sake.

Johnny was conceived in a drunken one-night stand with the much-older Craig Montgomery . The act left Jennifer guilt-ridden because Craig was the father of her first love, Bryant Montgomery, and also because she was seeing Mike Kasnoff at the time. Tragically, Bryant was killed in a car accident when they were teenagers after he witnessed Jennifer having sex with his cousin, Billy Ross. Her relationship with Billy deteriorated months later when she re-focused her energy into being a fashion model. She later left Oakdale to pursue her dreams in Tokyo, Japan.

When she returned after a bad relationship with a man named Andres, Jennifer embarked on love affairs with Jordan Sinclair and Mike Kasnoff. She married the latter but they later divorced after it became apparent that he was still in love with his ex-girlfriend, Katie Peretti. Her son, Johnny, briefly took on Mike's last name before Dusty adopted him.
