= Luke Snyder =

Fictional character from the American daytime drama As the World Turns

- As the World Turns character
- Van Hansis as Luke Snyder
- Portrayed by: Christopher Tavani (2001–2005); Jake Weary (2005); Van Hansis (2005–2010); (and child actors)
- Duration: 1995–2010
- First appearance: May 16, 1995
- Last appearance: September 17, 2010
- Created by: Richard Culliton
- Introduced by: Laurence Caso
In-universe information
- Other names: Luciano Eduardo Grimaldi
- Occupation: Employee of Grimaldi Shipping; Founder of a foundation to improve gay rights Intern at WOAK; Keyboard player of The Oakdale Five
- Parents: Damian Grimaldi; Lily Walsh Snyder
- Adoptive father: Holden Snyder
- Siblings: Abigail Williams; Aaron Snyder; Faith Snyder; Natalie Snyder; Ethan Snyder
- Grandparents: Orlena Grimaldi; Joshua Snyder-Stricklyn; Iva Snyder Benedict; Martin Guest; Lucinda Walsh; Harvey Snyder; Emma Snyder
- Aunts and uncles: Rose D'Angelo; Matthew John Dixon; Sierra Esteban; Bianca Walsh; Seth Snyder; Ellie Snyder; Caleb Snyder; Meg Snyder
- First cousins: Jade Taylor; Bryant Montgomery; Lucy Montgomery

Luciano "Luke" Eduardo Snyder (also Grimaldi) is a fictional character from the American daytime drama As the World Turns. Actor Van Hansis is most recognized for his portrayal of Luke from his debut in December 2005 until the series finale in September 2010.

Luke was born to Lily Walsh and Damian Grimaldi, and was subsequently raised by Lily and Holden Snyder (see Holden Snyder and Lily Walsh). When Luke became a teenager, he came out to his parents Lily and Holden that he was gay. Eventually they accepted him. He is also part of soap opera's first gay supercouple, Luke Snyder and Noah Mayer, also known as "Nuke" (Noah, Luke).

== Casting ==
The role of Luke Snyder was acted by several child actors from his debut in 1995 until 2001, when the character was SORASed with actor, Christopher Tavani. In March 2005, actor Jake Weary stepped into the role of a once again SORASed character of Luke.

Weary announced his decision to leave the series; this announcement led to rumors of the actor and his mother, Guiding Light actress Kim Zimmer leaving due to the character's upcoming coming out storyline. Zimmer denied such rumors, simply stating that Weary, who at the time was 15, wouldn't be able to dedicate the time needed for the storyline. He instead decided to focus on his school work.

On December 14, 2005 Van Hansis succeeded Weary in the role. Hansis would portray Luke until the series finale in 2010.

== Character description ==
Luke is depicted as honest, forthright and occasionally sarcastic. He values his relationships and is considerate, often putting the needs of others before himself. He's comfortable in both the rich and privileged world of the Walsh and Grimaldi families and the more down-to-earth atmosphere of the Snyder family.

Despite being confident in his sexuality, Luke has shown himself to be extremely insecure at times, several times irrationally so. This is especially noticeable when it comes to his relationship with Noah Mayer. Luke came out as a gay teenager, dealt with bullying, and eventually gained the support of his parents and family. However left him very sensitive about his sexuality.

After a somewhat tumultuous long-term relationship with Noah Mayer, that relationship ended. Luke began developing feelings for neurosurgeon, Dr. Reid Oliver, who was in town because Luke had blackmailed him to treat Noah. However, this was complicated by Noah wanting to restart his relationship with Luke. The show’s cancellation leaves the Luke and Noah storyline open ended, foreshadowing a future reunion.

== Character history ==
=== 1995–2005 ===
When Luke was born, his mother Lily Walsh did not know whether his father was her then-spouse Damian Grimaldi or her lover Holden Snyder. Although Damian proved to be the father, the two men struggled over possession of the boy for years before Holden – who had married Lily some years earlier – adopted Luke. When Luke was a teenager, he confessed to the murder of Julia Larrabee, who he blamed for breaking up his parents' marriage, to protect his mother, who he thought was guilty of the crime. When the true killer was found to be somebody else, his life did not return to normalcy; as his mother began dating another man, Keith Morrissey, Luke became an alcoholic. Following her son's kidney failure, Lily was blackmailed into promising to marry Keith by his promise of a new kidney for Luke, but after Luke's passionate appeal to Keith he released her from her vow. Luke's family was left intact, but Luke's problems were not over, as he continued seeing destructive friends and accidentally hit a pedestrian, Jade Taylor, with his car.

=== 2005–07 ===
Luke trusted Jade, who claims to everyone that she is Luke's cousin, enough to reveal his deepest secret to her – his romantic love for Kevin – she turned out to be a fraud, forcing him to pretend to be in love with her. Unfortunately, this destroys his relationship with Kevin. A desperate Luke comes out to his friend Will Munson before, on Will's advice, revealing his secret to his family. While a pregnant Lily can't accept her eldest son's sexual orientation, the rest of his family supports him.

Shortly after his surprise reappearance in their lives, Luke's birth father Damian tries to send Luke to a gender re-alignment camp. When Lily realizes the nature of the camp, she tries to reassure Luke that she will accept him, but thinking her the sole responsible party he lashes out angrily at her for her betrayal, inadvertently knocking her down the stairs. She lapses into a coma. Holden will not accept Luke's explanation for what happened, and Luke takes shelter from his adoptive father's anger with Damian. He grows closer to Damian especially when Damian claims to be dying...but it all falls apart when he later discovers the truth of his father's health. He severs ties with his birth father, changing his name, but yields his share in the Grimaldi family fortune to Damian before he goes.

Back home, Luke comes out to his friends. While Kevin has difficulty at first, he reconciles with Luke after Luke saves his life. Lily, who gave birth while in her coma, finally emerges to also reconcile with Luke and, to everyone's surprise, Jade turns out not to be a fraud after all.

=== 2007–10 ===
While interning at WOAK, Luke meets and falls for Noah Mayer. Noah is dating Luke's friend Maddie Coleman, but soon after Luke reveals his feelings to Noah, he begins to struggle with his own attraction. Eventually, he acknowledges that he is also gay, although he fears revealing this to his father. Unfortunately, Colonel Mayer learns the secret when he catches them in their second kiss and rejects Noah before devising a plan to murder Luke. His efforts leave Luke paralyzed for a time, although physical therapy, and Noahs help, eventually put him back on his feet. In spite of Colonel Mayer's plans, he and Noah remain a couple.

Their relationship is challenged when Noah, to save a young Iraqi woman with connections to his father from deportation, decides to marry her. Although he weds Ameera Ali Aziz, Noah reassures Luke of his steadfast love, but the relationship eventually instigates a break-up of the pair after Colonel Mayer is seemingly killed in a kidnapping plot and Ameera arrested. Noah blames Luke for the events, and Luke is angry that Noah requests time apart. The pair reconcile after a visit from Cyndi Lauper, who dedicates a performance of the song "True Colors" to them.

When Damian returns a portion of Luke's inheritance to him, he decides to start a charitable foundation, run by Brian Wheatley, who encourages Luke to be more discreet in his homosexuality to avoid alienating the philanthropic community. He also enters politics, running against his old friend Kevin for President of the Student Government at Oakdale U. He winds up cheating to overcome a dirty campaign by Kevin and is expelled when Noah comes clean to the dean about what Luke did. After an angry Luke, and Noah break up during the fallout, he begins drinking again and while drunk is kissed by Brian, who has married Luke's grandmother Lucinda. Later, when Luke is living at Lily and Holden's house and Brian and Lucinda must come to stay with them, does Brian confess that, he is attracted to Luke, and loves Lucinda.

Luke and Noah begin to rebuild their relationship after the election scandal, and reunite by Christmas, but when Luke becomes paranoid and jealous of Noah's friendship with Maddie, he kisses Brian himself. Noah, who sees this, is angry with Luke for some time, and Lucinda is soon angry as well when Jade blurts out the secret. Ostracized, Brian comes very close to suicide before Luke and Noah can intervene, but after their intervention, he makes peace with Lucinda and his own homosexuality before leaving town. Also, with the help of Jade, Casey Hughes, and Lucinda, Luke and Noah get back together and finally consummate their relationship.

Luke turns his Luke Snyder Foundation to LGBT rights after he and Noah are discriminated against in their housing search, but his personal life is complicated when Damian returns, ostensibly to make amends. Then, when a couple, under the guise of being twins, that Luke takes on as volunteers for his Foundation prove to be con-men after money, kidnapping first Noah and then Luke. Damian saves them both. Damian eventually remarries Lily, after Holdens apparent death, but flees the country mysteriously soon after.

When Noah is blinded in an accident at film school, he grows distant with Luke, feeling a need to be independent and continuously holding Luke responsible for what happened. Tired of being pushed away and blamed for Noah's accident Luke ends things with Noah, although Luke continues to help Noah during his crises, and they maintain a rocky friendship. Luke becomes intrigued by neurosurgeon Reid Oliver, who is working to save Noah's sight after Luke bribes him to come to Oakdale on Noahs behalf. Their involvement starts out a bit rocky when Noah gets his sight back, and refuses to reunite with Luke after seeing him and Dr. Oliver kissing. Feeling loyalty toward Noah, and guilt for falling for his doctor, Luke has a hard time figuring out who he wants to be with, in most cases, rebuking the Dr.s advances. In the end, however, he decides to pursue his relationship with Reid, with Noah remaining a constant presence. Soon after, Noah receives a grant to make a movie in Los Angeles and asks Luke to go with him. He tells him he cannot go. During the final episodes, Reid is mortally injured when his car is struck by a train.

With Reid dying not long before he is set to leave for LA, Noah is convinced by Allison to comfort Luke, but while he is willing to remain in Oakdale during his time in need, Luke urges him to pursue his dream. Noah tells Luke to stay in Oakdale, grieve, and heal, and that he will be waiting for him, leaving the door open to reconciliation. Noah leaves and Luke continues to grieve Reid. In his last scene Katie, Reid's best friend and roommate, gives Luke his stethoscope saying Reid would want him to have it. Luke asks Chris, the man who received Reid's heart after he died, if he could use it to listen to his heartbeat. He says it's okay and the final shot we ever have of Luke is of him listening to Reid's heart with a sad smile on his face.
