= Hayley Barr =

Austrian actress

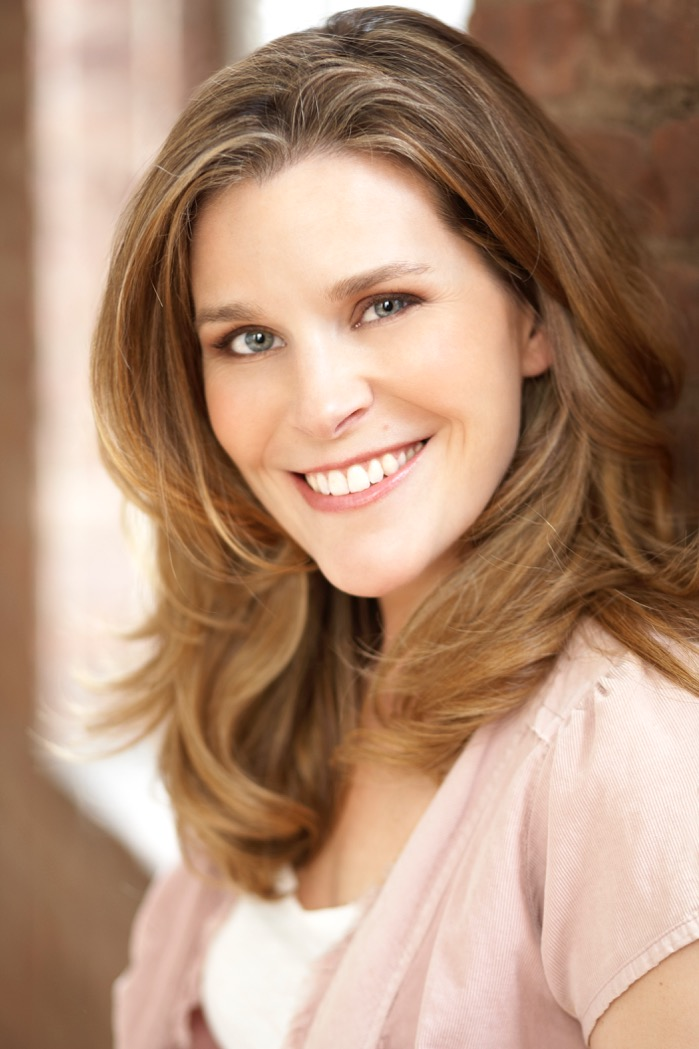
- Hayley Barr in New York, 2011
- Born: April 27, 1971 (age 54); Salzburg, Austria
- Other names: Hayley Sparks
- Occupation: Actress
- Years active: 1990–present
- Spouse: Jon Simmons

Hayley Barr (born April 27, 1971) is an Austrian actress. She is best known for playing the role of Courtney Baxter Dixon on the CBS soap opera As the World Turns from 1990 to 1993. She received three Soap Opera Digest Award nominations for her role on As the World Turns.

== Early life ==
Barr was born in Salzburg, Austria to Australian parents who were stationed at a nearby military base. Her father was a doctor and her mother was a teacher. She is the second of four children. As of 1992, she maintained dual citizenship.

When she was four years old, Barr's family settled in Portland, Oregon. She began studying ballet at the age of five. When she was eleven, she was cast as Pepper in a Portland Civic Center production of Annie. She also appeared in Ballet West's production of The Nutcracker and worked as a model.

Barr attended Sunset High School, where she worked in the theater department and won awards for competitive speaking. The summer before her senior year, she was chosen to attend Northwestern University's five week National High School Institute, where she studied with Peter Hedges. She attended New York University and studied at the Circle in the Square Theatre's Professional Workshop.

== Career ==
Barr appeared in New York stage productions of Jesus Christ Superstar, Addict, Peter Pan, and West Side Story. After her first semester at NYU, she found that she couldn't afford to continue paying her tuition. She moved to Los Angeles to look for acting work, but she ended up landing a role in New York instead. After unsuccessfully auditioning for the role of Lily Walsh on the CBS soap opera As the World Turns (which went to Heather Rattray), she won the role of Courtney Baxter. She was nominated for Soap Opera Digest Awards in 1991, 1992, and 1993. Barr stayed with the show from 1990 to 1993.

She appeared as herself in the 1996 film Looking for Richard.

In 1999 and 2002, Barr temporarily played the role of Harley Cooper on Guiding Light, filling in for Beth Ehlers.

She played Sarah Fisher in the 2005 film Sum of Existence.

After interning for Annie Leibovitz, she now works as a professional photographer. Her clients have included Marie Claire, The New York Times, Sunday Life, Camilla, Cotton On, and Westfield.

== Filmography ==
=== Film ===
Year	Title	Role	Notes
1996	Looking For Richard	Herself	
2005	Sum of Existence	Sarah Fisher	

=== Television ===
Year	Title	Role	Notes
1990-1993	As the World Turns	Courtney Baxter Dixon	Contract role
1998	Soul Man	Alex Watson	Episode: "Play Ball"
1999-2002	Guiding Light	Harley Cooper	Temporary replacement
