= Holden Snyder =

- As the World Turns character
- Portrayed by: Jon Hensley
- Duration: 1985–88; 1990–95; 1997–2010
- First appearance: October 15, 1985
- Last appearance: September 17, 2010
- Created by: Douglas Marland
- Introduced by: Robert Calhoun (1985); Laurence Caso (1990); Felicia Minei Behr (1997)
In-universe information
- Occupation: Horse trainer Former Manager of WOAK; Executive at Montgomery & Associates; Former Supervisor for one of the European showrooms of furniture maker Henry Lange; Former Executive at World Wide; Former Stable boy Host of "The Holden and Lily Show"
- Father: Harvey Snyder
- Mother: Emma Snyder
- Siblings: Seth Snyder; Iva Benedict (adoptive); Ellie Snyder; Caleb Snyder; Meg Snyder
- Spouse: Emily Stewart (1986–88); Angel Lange (1989–90); Lily Walsh (1991–93, 2002–09)
- Sons: Aaron Snyder; Luke Snyder (adopted); Ethan Snyder
- Daughters: Abigail Williams; Noel Snyder (adopted); Faith Snyder; Natalie Snyder
- Aunts and uncles: Henry Snyder; Bert Snyder
- Nephews: MJ Dixon (adoptive)
- Nieces: Lily Walsh (adoptive); Rose D'Angelo (adoptive); Eliza Ryan
- First cousins: Jack Snyder; Brad Snyder; Josh Stricklyn (adoptive)

Holden Snyder is a fictional character on the CBS daytime soap opera As the World Turns. He was portrayed by Jon Hensley from 1985 to 1988, 1990 to 1995 and 1997 until the show's final episode on September 17, 2010. Hensley's character is part of the large Snyder clan, one of the central families on the show that reflected the life of the show's then-head writer Douglas Marland. Holden's introduction immediately involved his romance and struggles with future wife Lily Walsh Snyder.

== Casting and characterization ==
Jon Hensley joined the show on October 15, 1985 in the role of stable boy Holden Snyder as part of head writer Douglas Marland's decision to reintroduce a younger set of characters to revitalize the show. Hensley previously played the role of Brody Price on the ABC soap opera One Life to Live the same year. Marland, who previously worked as the head writer of the CBS soap opera Guiding Light for a number of years accepted the advice of his young niece to bring on younger characters much like he did on GL. The plan resulted in the popular romance of Holden and Lily, who was portrayed by Martha Byrne at the time.

Hensley remained as part of the show until 1988 when he moved to London to study at the Shakespeare Academy of Music, Drama and Art. He returned to the show in 1990 but left again in 1995. In 1997, Hensley was at the center of a "bidding war" between ATWT and ABC's soap opera All My Children before he rejoined the CBS drama again airing on January 3, 1997 and remained until the show's final episode on September 17, 2010. Hensley was nominated for three Daytime Emmy Awards including Outstanding Younger Actor in 1986 and 1987 and Outstanding Lead Actor in 2001.

Hensley's character was said to have been based on the early life of Marland and in an interview with Nelson Branco of TV Guide Canada, he discussed his feelings on the matter and getting to know his former co-worker.

"I think my character was who Doug was as a kid so he had this special interest in me as a person. He always made sure I was growing as a person and made sure I was happy. We would have dinner once a month and go to the theatre. He was more of a father figure for me than anything else. He was very caring and loving. It was a very special relationship. I never expected to have experienced something like that with a head writer. I mean, when you go out with your head writer, you’re terrified because you don’t know what to expect."

—Jon Hensley, TV Guide Canada

Hensley and his wife Kelley Menighan Hensley, who played Emily Stewart on ATWT moved to Los Angeles following the end of the show. Nearly two years after the final episode of ATWT, Hensley returned to daytime when he accepted a role on the CBS soap opera The Bold and the Beautiful to air in May 2012.

== Character history ==
Holden Snyder is the son of Emma Snyder and the late Harvey Snyder and is often seen as the man and modern patriarch of his family. He grew up with his siblings Seth Snyder, Iva Snyder, Caleb Snyder, Ellie Snyder and Meg Snyder and moved to Oakdale when he met his future wife Lily Walsh Snyder. With Lily, he has three biological children including Faith Snyder, Natalie Snyder and Ethan Snyder and also adopted her son Luke Snyder, who was fathered by Lily's ex-husband Damian Grimaldi. Divorced from Lily twice, Holden also married Emily Stewart and Angel Lange. His other children include Abigail Williams with Molly Conlan, Aaron Snyder with Julie Wendall and an adopted daughter named Noel Snyder with Angel Lange with whom the couple lost custody. Holden also has several cousins that include Jack Snyder and Brad Snyder. Holden began work as a stable boy before becoming a horse trainer, along with several positions in business such as manager at the town's television station WOAK and an executive career at Walsh-Montgomery Enterprises.

Holden and Lily met after he began work at her mother's stables and after they began their star-crossed relationship, they were shocked to learn in 1987 that Lily's mother Lucinda Walsh was not her biological mother. Lucinda revealed that she adopted her and was the biological daughter of Holden's sister Iva Snyder and his cousin Joshua Snyder-Stricklyn. Holden and Lily were thought to be related but it was revealed that her biological parents were only adopted into the Snyder family. The romance blossomed and suffered two divorces, Holden's brain injury, amnesia and presumed deaths, his battles with her exes Damian and Dusty Donovan and him being drawn to his exes Molly Conlan and eventually Carly Snyder. The pair is considered to be the central couple ever to be featured on the show and Hensley, along with Lily's portrayer Martha Byrne have become one of daytime's most popular supercouples Holden also assisted his son Luke in his struggles as he faced life after coming out as gay, a storyline which forced recast with Van Hansis taking over for Jake Weary, the son of Guiding Light actress Kim Zimmer. Holden and Lily's marriage was also put to the test when her twin sister Rose D'Angelo died, which led to the couple to drift apart. Holden met Jack's wife Julia Larrabee, whom he married while he had amnesia, and they began a relationship after Jack chose his real wife Carly. The new couple caused controversy within the Snyder family before she was killed by Les Sweeney, her ex-husband who injected her with bee venom. After reconciling, Holden and Lily remarried.

Lily's marriage to Damian when Holden was presumed dead had become too much for Holden to accept and they spent time away from one another. During his time out of Lily's life, he was thought to have died in a car accident in Kentucky but was nursed back to health by Maeve Stone, played by Judi Evans, whose abusive husband Eb Stone thought Holden knew the location of money that he stole from a bank. After Maeve got away from Eb, she followed Holden back to Oakdale when he learned of Lily and Damian's marriage. Although Holden and Maeve did not pursue a relationship, he encouraged her to live her life with independence. Holden eventually pursued his relationship and almost married his ex-girlfriend Molly.

== See also ==
- Holden Snyder and Lily Walsh
- Supercouple
