= Douglas Marland =

American screenwriter (1934–1993)

Douglas Marland (born Marland Messner; May 5, 1934 – March 6, 1993) was an American writer, known for his work as the head writer of several soap operas.

== Career ==
Marland began his career as an actor, appearing on the Irna Phillips series The Brighter Day and As the World Turns. He also did odd jobs on the side as a director for small theatre groups. On one such job, staging the DeSylva, Brown, and Henderson musical Good News!, he worked with Broadway dancer Edie Cowan and pianist Ethan Mordden, both of whom went on to professional careers as, respectively, choreographer and writer.

Marland began his writing career by authoring some Nick Carter mysteries, under one of the publisher's standard pseudonyms. He first started writing scripts for soap operas in the 1970s, as a script writer for Harding Lemay on Another World.

== Soap operas ==
=== The Doctors ===
He was hired by NBC Daytime in 1976 after then head writer, Margaret DePriest, left The Doctors. Although Marland's writing received critical acclaim and the show received Daytime Emmys, ratings dropped.

During his tenure on The Doctors which spanned from September 20, 1976, to September 30, 1977, a variety of new acting talent were added to the program: Kathy Bates (Phyllis), Glenn Corbett (Jason Aldrich), Carol Potter (Betsy Match), Ted Danson (Mitch Pierson), and Jonathan Frakes (Tom Carroll), among other actors. Marland was instrumental in shifting the serial's focus away from Hope Memorial Hospital to the Powers and Aldrich families, as well as the Dancy family, introduced by previous head writers Robert Cenedella and Margaret DePriest.

=== General Hospital ===
After his job on The Doctors, he was hired by ABC Daytime on January 16, 1978, to work with Gloria Monty on their serial General Hospital. At that time, the show was near cancellation. Marland's writing, along with Monty's extensive production changes, helped the show rise in the ratings.

Marland was instrumental in pairing the iconic of Luke Spencer and Laura Webber, as well as creating vixen nurse Bobbie Spencer, and the Quartermaine family. Although the changes at General Hospital were a success, Marland was not interested in moving to Los Angeles, where the show was produced, and didn't like the show's increased pacing by Monty. Marland left the show a year later on August 3, 1979.

=== As the World Turns and Guiding Light ===
Back in New York, he was asked by CBS Daytime to temporarily assume the head writing reins at As the World Turns, which he did for thirteen weeks from November 7, 1979, to January 4, 1980.

In 1979, he assumed the head writing reins of Guiding Light. Marland's run on GL produced popular storylines and characters, first airing on January 31, 1980. One character Marland introduced was Nola Reardon, played by Lisa Brown. The unconventional Nola started as a villainess and became the heroine of the show.

Another story was an envelope-pushing story that featured the character of Carrie Todd Marler (played by Jane Elliot). Carrie was diagnosed with multiple personalities, and Marland had barely delved into her psychosis when Elliot's contract was abruptly terminated by Executive Producer Allen M. Potter in 1982; Marland resigned in protest, last airing on September 24, 1982.

=== Loving ===
Marland next teamed up with fellow writer Agnes Nixon to create Loving, which premiered on June 26, 1983. He served as head writer for the show's first two years, until June 14, 1985. The show was a critical but not commercial success during the time that he wrote it.

=== A New Day in Eden ===
During the 1982–1983 season, he co-wrote, with James Rosin, a show that he had created, A New Day in Eden for the cable channel Showtime. The show was hailed as TV's first "nude" serial, in which many cast members would perform their love scenes without clothes. The show thrived on the taboo, showcasing bodies and a perverse combination of sex and violence, including a deflowering in a barn, a sexual assault in a shower, and one story in which a woman seduced the rival for another man's affections in a lesbian storyline. Despite its controversy and the fact that the cast included Steve Carlson, Jane Elliot (fresh from her run as Tracy on GH & Carrie on GL), and Lara Parker (famous as the witch Angelique on the cult Dark Shadows) and that it was produced and sometimes directed by daytime veteran actress Susan Flannery, A New Day in Eden only lasted 66 episodes.

=== Return to As the World Turns ===
Marland was hired in 1985 to return to As the World Turns, his material began airing on October 14, 1985. Marland refocused the show and made the Hughes family central to the plot again. He used over 30 years of history to create new storylines for core characters Bob Hughes and Kim Hughes. (One story, where a child previously thought to be dead was found to be alive and living in England, was a dual role played by future Oscar-winning actress Julianne Moore.) He was also credited with bringing original cast members Helen Wagner and Don MacLaughlin back to the center the show as Nancy and Chris Hughes, after they'd been bumped to recurring status in 1982. When McLaughlin (and his character) died in 1986, Marland paired Nancy with Chief of Detectives Dan McClosky, and then chronicled McClosky's subsequent battle with Alzheimer's disease. He also reached back to Lisa McColl's 1965 stint on short-lived ATWT spinoff Our Private World, giving her a son, Scott Eldridge, hitherto unknown to viewers, who tracked her down as an adult. (He was said to have been born during the several-month-long lapse between when Private World ended and when Lisa resurfaced on ATWT in mid-1966.)

He also introduced a new working-class family, the Snyders, into the storyline and added new dimensions to the wealthy Lucinda Walsh (Elizabeth Hubbard) by tying the Walshes and Snyders together. This resulted in the pairing of Lily Walsh (Martha Byrne) and Holden Snyder (Jon Hensley). It was also revealed that Iva Snyder (Lisa Brown) was the biological mother of Lucinda's adopted daughter Lily. The new Snyder family was based largely on Douglas Marland's own experiences; he grew up on a farm in West Sand Lake, NY. In several interviews, Marland remarked that the character of Seth Snyder was based largely on his own life. Seth was the oldest child, who had been taken on great responsibility in helping to raise his siblings following patriarch Harvey Snyder's death. This event was key to the formation of the Snyder family dynamic, in that Marland was allowed to write a strong and independent yet maternal figure in matriarch Emma Snyder (Kathleen Widdoes).

Marland was also responsible for adding the first gay male character on an American soap opera to his story during his tenure, Hank Elliot (Brian Starcher). The story was short-lived (Hank was featured for about 18 months), but groundbreaking; the soap opera became a pioneer for others who wished to put gay male characters, heretofore unseen, on their respective shows. Although the story centered on Hank, it allowed viewers to see another side to long running characters, when those characters reacted to the news that Hank was gay. Hank was written off of the show to take care of his lover Charles, who was dying of AIDS. Starcher was nominated for a Soap Opera Digest Award in 1990.

Marland diversified the previously white canvas of As the World Turns, introducing an Amerasian character as the child of a Vietnam vet, and also featuring a story of a mixed-race couple marrying and having a baby (and showing negative reactions to the marriage and birth). Another story featured town matriarch Nancy Hughes helping a young, illiterate African-American girl (played by singer/actress Lauryn Hill), learn to read.

Marland also penned a story featuring the character of Ellie Snyder having an abortion; abortion is a rarity in daytime and this again allowed Marland to write about both sides of a controversial issue.

Marland wrote ATWT until his death from complications after abdominal surgery on March 6, 1993. His material aired until April 23, 1993.

== Marland's Rules ==
During his tenure at As the World Turns, Marland gave an interview to a soap magazine with his rules on "how NOT to ruin a soap". In the years that followed, and since his death, the rules have been much discussed in the serial press and by Internet soap opera fans.

The rules are:

- Watch the show.
- Learn the history of the show. You would be surprised at the ideas that you can get from the back story of your characters.
- Read the fan mail. The very characters that are not thrilling to you may be the audience's favorites.
- Be objective. When I came in to (the show), the first thing I said was, what is pleasing the audience? You have to put your own personal likes and dislikes aside and develop the characters that the audience wants to see.
- Talk to everyone; writers and actors especially. There may be something in a character's history that will work beautifully for you, and who would know better than the actor who has been playing the role?
- Don't change a core character. You can certainly give them edges they didn't have before, or give them a logical reason to change their behavior. But when the audience says, "He would never do that," then you have failed.
- Build new characters slowly. Everyone knows that it takes six months to a year for an audience to care about a new character. Tie them in to existing characters. Don't shove them down the viewers' throats.
- If you feel staff changes are in order, look within the organization first. P&G (Procter & Gamble) does a lot of promoting from within. Almost all of our producers worked their way up from staff positions, and that means they know the show.
- Don't fire anyone for six months. I feel very deeply that you should look at the show's canvas before you do anything.
- Good soap opera is good storytelling. It's very simple.

== Awards and nominations ==
Marland won several Daytime Emmy Awards, including one in 1974–75 as the associate writer for "Another World," and two as head writer for "Guiding Light."

He also earned several Emmy nominations as head writer for "As the World Turns"

Daytime Emmy Awards

WINS

- (1975; Best Writing; Another World)
- (1981 & 1982; Best Writing; Guiding Light)
- (1993; Lifetime Achievement Award, posthumous)

NOMINATIONS

- (1986, 1989, 1991 & 1993; Best Writing; As the World Turns)

Writers Guild of America Award

NOMINATIONS

- (1990 season; As the World Turns)
