= Anthony Herrera =

American actor (1944–2011)

- Born: Anthony John Herrera; January 19, 1944; Wiggins, Mississippi, U.S.
- Died: June 21, 2011 (aged 67); Buenos Aires, Argentina
- Education: University of Mississippi
- Occupation: Actor
- Partner: Viva
- Children: Gaby Hoffmann

Anthony John Herrera (January 19, 1944 – June 21, 2011) was an American actor.

== Early life and family background ==
Herrera was born on January 19, 1944, in Wiggins, Mississippi, to Theresa Jewel (née Blackburn) and Rafael Antonio Herrera. His paternal grandfather was French-born Gaston Louis Malécot, an instructor at Columbia University and a World War I veteran, and his paternal grandmother was Spanish.

Reared in Stone County, Mississippi by his maternal grandparents, he graduated from Wiggins High School. He earned a bachelor's degree from the University of Mississippi and was a member of Sigma Chi fraternity. He was the biological father of actress Gaby Hoffmann. Herrera and Gaby's mother, Viva, were estranged shortly before Gaby's birth. She was raised by Viva, in the Chelsea Hotel.

== Career ==
Herrera's professional acting career began in 1969. He became best known for his role as the evil James Stenbeck on the soap opera As the World Turns, a role he played periodically between 1980 and 2010. Herrera also played Mark Galloway in 1974 and 1975 on the same show. From the fall of 1975 to 1977, he played Jack Curtis, a college professor who cheated on his wife, driving her to obesity, on The Young and the Restless, and played Dane Hammond on Loving from 1984–1986 and again in 1990–1991.

Herrera produced and directed a short documentary titled Mississippi Delta Blues, about the life of James "Son" Thomas. In 1987, he wrote and directed an episode of American Playhouse titled "The Wide Net", starring Kyra Sedgwick. He also appeared as Lee Falk's Mandrake the Magician, alongside Ji-Tu Cumbuka as Lothar, in a failed TV series pilot.

== Last years ==
Herrera was diagnosed with mantle cell lymphoma, an aggressive and normally fatal type of non-Hodgkin's lymphoma, in 1997. He went to Memorial Sloan-Kettering and underwent chemotherapy, total body irradiation, and an autologous stem cell transplant, but all these treatments were unsuccessful. In 1999, he received an allogenic stem cell transplant using bone marrow donated from his brother, John. Herrera's disease went into remission for at least nine years, and was considered a "pioneer case" and proof that donor stem cells could induce long-term remission.

In 2005, Herrera wrote a book about his experiences, which he titled The Cancer War. In October of that year he testified before U.S. Congress on the importance of stem cell research. In October 2010, Herrera was the featured guest speaker at the Cardiology & Oncology International Symposium in Nashville, Tennessee. His remission from cancer ended, however. He died on June 21, 2011, aged 67, in Buenos Aires, Argentina.

== Partial filmography ==
- Night of Bloody Horror (1969) – Man In Club
- Midway (1976) – Marine Lieutenant at Internment Camp (uncredited)
- Mandrake (1979) – Mandrake the Magician
- Twisted (1986) – Orator
- Extreme Justice (1993) – Bill Keller
- Foreign Student (1994) – Coach Mallard
