= Kelley Menighan Hensley =

American actress

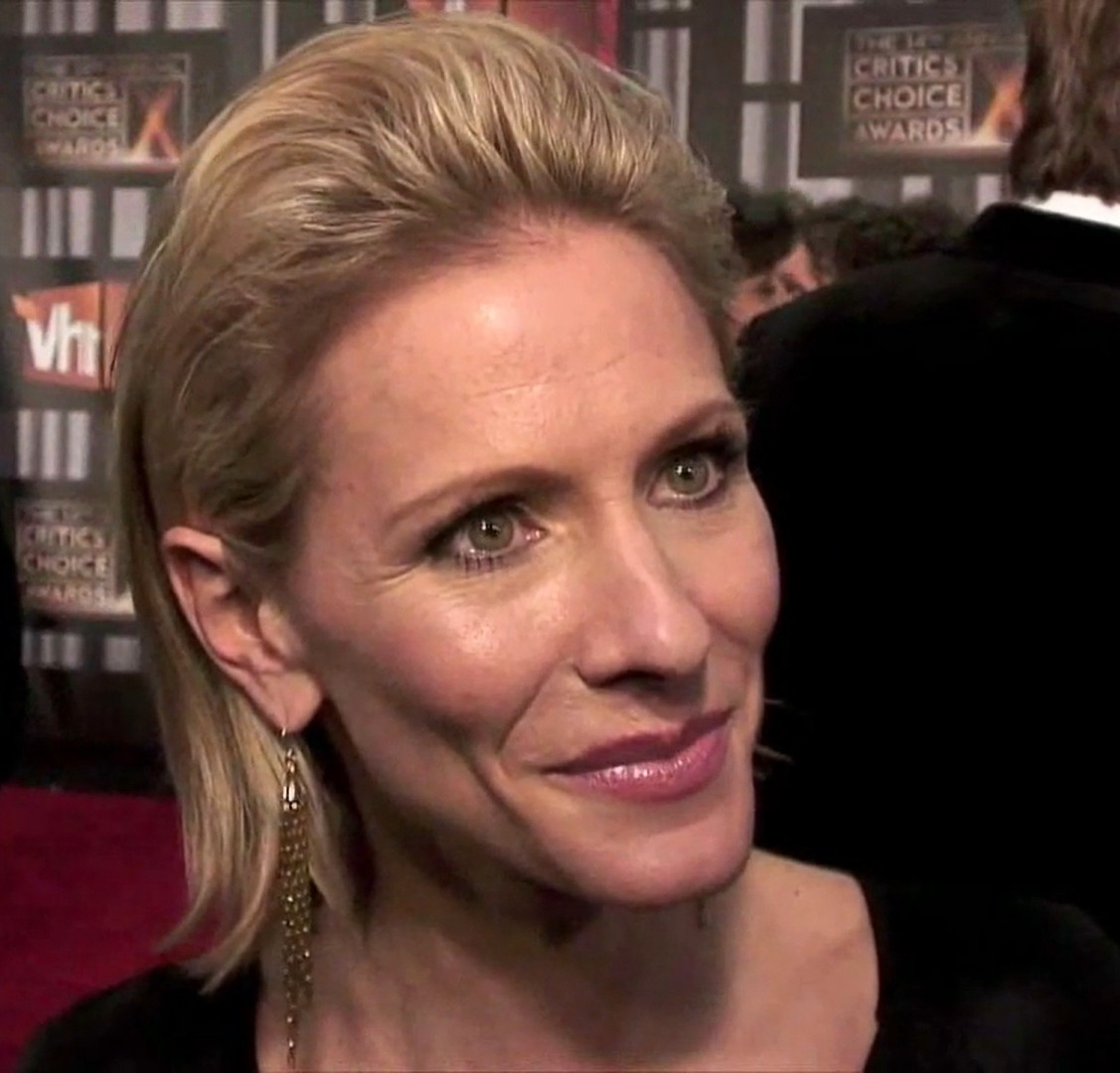
- Hensley in 2009
- Born: February 15, 1967 (age 59); Glenview, Illinois, U.S.
- Occupation: Actress
- Spouse: Jon Hensley (m. 1996; div. 2015)
- Children: 3

Kelley Menighan Hensley (born February 15, 1967, in Glenview, Illinois) is an American actress best known for her role as Emily Stewart on As the World Turns.

== Career ==
Hensley appeared on the program from 1992 until the series finale in 2010. She earned Daytime Emmy nominations in 2002 and 2008 for Best Supporting Actress.

Hensley also made a cross-over to the daytime drama, The Young and the Restless on March 27, 2007, portraying Emily opposite Adrienne Frantz's Amber Moore.

In 2012, Hensley appeared on the Showtime dark satire series Reality Show. She played Katherine Warwick, the matriarch of a family being recorded for a reality TV series without their knowledge or permission. From 2013 to 2014, Hensley portrayed Veronica Ashton on the soap opera web series Tainted Dreams.

== Personal life ==
A resident of Old Tappan, New Jersey, she married her co-star Jon Hensley (Holden Snyder) on May 25, 1996. The couple had three children and divorced in 2015. Hensley is a vegetarian.

== Filmography ==
=== Film ===
Year	Title	Role	Notes
1990	Guns	Tong's Blonde	
2015	Shooting the Warwicks	Katherine Warwick	

=== Television ===
Year	Title	Role	Notes
1992–2010	As the World Turns	Emily Stewart	1,713 episodes
1989	Young Charlie Chaplin	Uncredited	Episode #1.6
1991	The Gambler Returns: The Luck of the Draw	Waitress	Television film
2007	The Young and the Restless	Emily Stewart	Episode #1.8606
2012	Reality Show	Katherine Warwick	7 episodes
2014–2017	Tainted Dreams	Veronica Ashford	12 episodes
