= Martha Byrne =

American actress (born 1969)

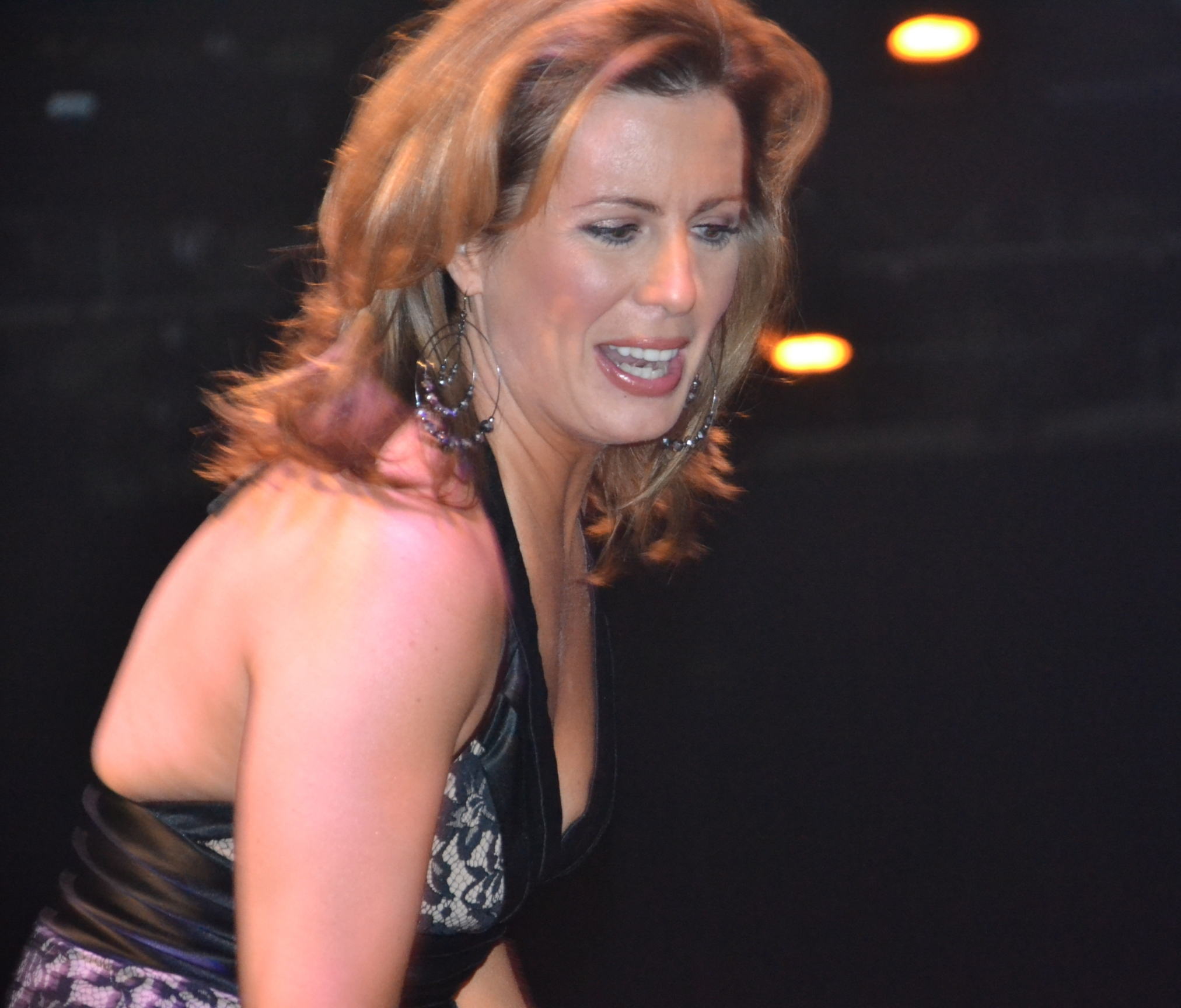
- Byrne in 2012
- Born: Mary Martha Byrne; December 23, 1969 (age 56); Ridgewood, New Jersey, U.S.
- Occupation: Actress
- Years active: 1982–present
- Spouse: Michael McMahon (m. 1994)
- Children: 3
- Website: marthabyrne.net

Mary Martha Byrne (born December 23, 1969) is an American actress. She played the role of Lily Walsh Snyder on the soap opera As the World Turns from 1985 to 1989, then again from 1993 to 2008; as well as, from 2000 to 2003, Lily's twin sister, Rose D'Angelo. Byrne has also appeared in other stage, television and movie roles, including the title role in the 1983 film Anna to the Infinite Power. She is currently executive producer of the digital drama series Anacostia, where she has played the role of Alexis Jordan since 2011. Byrne has won three Daytime Emmy Awards for acting.

== Early life ==
Byrne was born in Ridgewood, New Jersey, the daughter of Terrence Joseph and Mary Adele (née TuMulty) Byrne.

== Career ==
=== Featured roles ===
Byrne began acting at a young age when she joined the cast of the Broadway musical Annie, where she played the role of July.

She was a featured actor on a number of prime time episodic television programs, including Kate and Allie; Murder, She Wrote; Parker Lewis Can't Lose; Jake and the Fatman; In the Heat of the Night; and Hearts are Wild. Byrne also appeared in several television movies, with featured roles in When the Cradle Falls and Pink Lightning.

Byrne's best known film role was as the title character in the 1983 film Anna to the Infinite Power. In 2010 she provided the commentary for the film's DVD release.

=== Daytime television ===
Byrne is best known for portraying Lily Walsh Snyder on the CBS Daytime soap opera As the World Turns. She started in May 1985 at age 15, taking over from another teenage actress. Byrne soon became part of a "supercouple" when then-head writer Douglas Marland paired "poor little rich girl" Lily with hard-luck farmhand Holden Snyder, played by Jon Hensley. The show attracted controversy in 1987 when Byrne—months shy of her 18th birthday—and equally underage actor Brian Bloom played out a storyline in which they lost their virginity to each other.

Byrne won a Daytime Emmy Award for Outstanding Younger Actress in 1987. She left As the World Turns in 1989, and returned in April 1993. From 2000 until 2003, Byrne also played a second role, Lily's long-lost twin, Rose D'Angelo. She won another Daytime Emmy in 2001, this time as Outstanding Lead Actress.

Byrne left As the World Turns again in April 2008. The show's executive producer Christopher Goutman stated, "We made Martha an incredibly generous offer in hopes that she would remain a valuable member of the ATWT cast. Unfortunately, Martha has decided to leave despite our best efforts to keep her." Byrne later asserted that the contract negotiations fell through because the show refused to guarantee her the same number of episodes of work she had previously been guaranteed. She added that a casting call was made for her successor during her contract negotiations, which fueled her drive to leave. Byrne's last airdate on the show was April 22, 2008; her successor, Noelle Beck, appeared in the role of Lily from May 2008 until the series' end in 2010.

Byrne was hired as a script writer by Bradley Bell for The Bold and the Beautiful in early 2009. From June 17 though September 9, 2009, she portrayed Andrea Floyd on the ABC soap opera General Hospital.

Byrne began portraying Alexis Jordan (née Joanne Edwards) on the soap opera web series Anacostia in 2011, winning a 2012 Indie Series Award for Best Guest Appearance (Drama), and a 2015 Daytime Emmy Award for Outstanding Performer in a New Approaches Drama Series. The entire cast won a 2015 Indie Series Award for Best Ensemble (Drama). Byrne served as a co-executive producer, director and writer for the series from 2012-2016, and was promoted to Executive Producer in the show's 2017 fifth season. As a producer, Byrne was also nominated for the Daytime Emmy for Outstanding New Approaches Drama Series in 2015.

=== Music ===
Byrne is also a singer. She contributed a Christmas medley to the 1994 RCA release, A Soap Opera Christmas. She released her self-titled album Martha Byrne in 1996.

She has also released a second album, Woman Thing Music. Byrne again was the subject of controversy, as the sponsor of the second album was Philip Morris. The CD could only be purchased in conjunction with the purchase of cigarettes, or at one of the "Woman Music Thing" concerts that Philip Morris sponsored. Byrne eventually withdrew endorsement from the music label, as she did not want to be associated with a product that could encourage underage smoking.

In 2006 Byrne released a third album, The Other Side.

== Awards and recognition ==
Byrne is a ten-time Daytime Emmy Award-nominee as actress and producer, winning Outstanding Younger Actress in 1987, Outstanding Lead Actress in 2001, and Outstanding Performer in a New Approaches Drama Series in 2015.

== Personal life ==
Byrne married Michael McMahon, a former undercover officer in the New York City Police Department, on November 12, 1994. She grew up in Waldwick, New Jersey and lives in nearby Ridgewood.

Their first child, Michael Terrence McMahon, was born on May 29, 1998. An episode of the TLC series A Baby Story chronicled her second pregnancy and the birth of her son, Maxwell Vincent McMahon, on September 3, 2002. Their third child and first daughter, Annmarie, was born June 12, 2006.

== Filmography ==
Year	Title	Role	Notes
1982	The Eyes of the Amaryllis	Jenny Reade	
1982	Drop-Out Father	Elizabeth McCall	
1983	Anna to the Infinite Power	Anna Hart	
1983	The Hamptons	Miranda	1 episode
1984	He's Fired, She's Hired	Emily Grier	
1985	As the World Turns	Lily Walsh Snyder	1985–1989, 1993–2008
1985	The Beniker Gang	Molly Stamwick	aka Dear Lola, or How to Start Your Own Family
1985	Kate & Allie	Carter Lowe	1 episode
1986	As the World Turns: 30th Anniversary	Lily	
1989	In the Heat of the Night	Lizbeth Hagen	
1990	Jake and the Fatman	Melanie Wilkerson	
1990	The Young Riders	Vera Collins	2 episode
1990	Doogie Howser, M.D.	Sasha Larkin	1 episode
1990	Over My Dead Body	Julie Talmadge	1 episode
1991	Bob Hope & Friends: Making New Memories	Herself	
1991	Murder, She Wrote	Sarah Lapp	1 episode
1991	Silk Stalkings	Erica Dietz	1 episode
1991	Pink Lightning	Jill	
1992	Parker Lewis Can't Lose	Erin	
1997	The Marksmen	Alison Wells	
1997	When the Cradle Falls	Donna McDermott	
2001	The 28th Annual Daytime Emmy Awards	Herself	
2001	Mergers & Acquisitions	Iowa	
2004	Living It Up! With Ali and Jack	Herself	March 17, 2004
2006	SoapTalk	Herself	May 8, 2006, April 5, 2006
2006	Life After Tomorrow	Herself	
2009	General Hospital	Andrea Floyd	June 17–September 9, 2009
2011–present	Anacostia	Alexis Jordan	
2014	Crisis	Marie Wirth	1 episode

== Writer ==
Year	Title	Role	Notes
2009	The Bold and the Beautiful	script writer	3 episodes

== Producer ==
Year	Title	Role	Notes
2009	Bye Bye Sally	executive producer	
