= Lisa Brown (actress) =

American actress (1954–2021)

- Born: August 2, 1954; Kansas City, Missouri, U.S.
- Died: November 24, 2021 (aged 67); Jersey City, New Jersey, U.S.
- Occupation: Actress
- Years active: 1980–2009
- Spouses: Tom Nielsen (m. 1982; div. 1991) Brian Neary (m. 1997)
- Children: 2

Lisa Brown (August 2, 1954, Kansas City, Missouri – November 24, 2021, Jersey City, New Jersey) was an American actress. She was best known for two high-profile roles in daytime television, Nola Reardon on Guiding Light and Iva Snyder on As the World Turns.

== Career ==
Brown's first notable role was on Guiding Light, where she played the role of Nola Reardon Chamberlain from 1980 to 1985 and again from 1995 to 1998 (with an appearance in the show's final weeks in 2009). She and actor Michael Tylo, who played Quint, were a popular pairing on the show. She created another notable soap role in the form of Iva Snyder on As the World Turns, playing her from November 6, 1985, to 1994 and with several guest appearances from 1998 to 2003. Both roles were created by writer Douglas Marland, and Brown was in some ways a "muse" for Marland's writing. After her acting roles on both shows concluded, she was an acting coach for Guiding Light and One Life to Live.

Brown appeared in the lead role of the Broadway version of 42nd Street in the early 1980s, while simultaneously playing her Guiding Light role. Other daytime work included a short stint as a corrupt FBI agent on Loving in 1995.

== Personal life ==
Brown was married to Tom Nielsen, an actor who played one of Brown's love interests, Floyd Parker, on Guiding Light, from 1979 to 1985. They had two children together, Victoria and James "Buddy" Anthony Nielsen, who as a child played her infant son on Guiding Light and is now the lead singer of Senses Fail. Brown helped produce and direct several of their videos.

In 1997, she married Brian Neary.

Brown lived the remainder of her life in Jersey City, New Jersey, where she died on November 24, 2021, at the age of 67. In a post on his Instagram shortly after her death, Buddy Nielsen indicated that she had a "quick battle with cancer."
