= Jon Hensley =

American actor (born 1965)

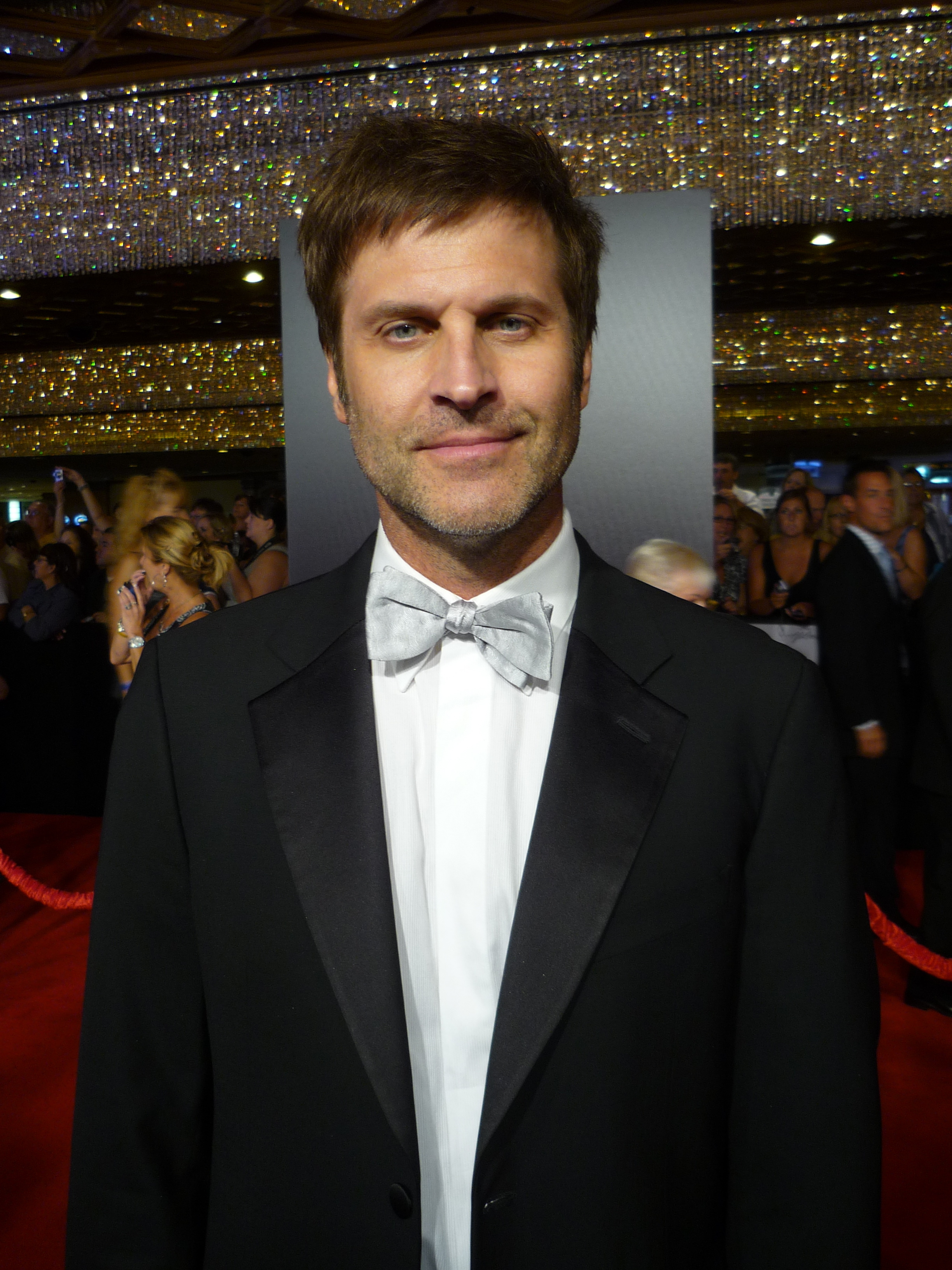
- Born: August 26, 1965 (age 60); Browns Mills, New Jersey, US
- Occupations: Actor; singer; songwriter
- Years active: 1985–2013
- Spouse: Kelley Menighan Hensley (m. 1996; div. 2015)
- Partner: Natasha Sorokin (2016–present)
- Children: 3

Jon Hensley (born August 26, 1965, in Browns Mills, New Jersey) is an American actor, singer and songwriter, best recognized for his portrayal of Holden Snyder on the CBS daytime soap opera As the World Turns, a role he held from 1985 until the series finale on September 17, 2010. He later portrayed Dr. Meade on The Bold and the Beautiful from 2012 to 2013.

== Career ==
Hensley's first television role was in 1985 on the daytime drama One Life to Live as Brody Price. That role was short-term, but led to Hensley being cast in the role for which he is best known, the role of rebellious farmhand Holden Snyder on As the World Turns.

Hensley started on the series in 1985, and became a popular player when the character of Holden and his "wrong side of the tracks" love affair with rich Lily Walsh (Martha Byrne) set the stage for much story in the 1980s and early 1990s.

Hensley ended his first stint in 1988. During his first break from the show, Hensley studied at the National Shakespeare Conservatory 8-week summer session in Kerhonkson, New York, in 1989.

Hensley returned to the series in 1990 and continued on until 1995. He returned again in 1997, where his character eventually resumed his relationship with Lily. The couple is considered to have reached "supercouple" status and are recognized as one of the serial's most recognized supercouples.

Outside of daytime, Hensley has starred in the USA Network television movie Wounded Heart, and made appearances on Beverly Hills, 90210, and Almost Perfect.

Hensley returned to daytime in May 2012 in the recurring role of Dr. Meade on the CBS daytime soap opera The Bold and the Beautiful.

== Personal life ==
Hensley met co-star Kelley Menighan, who portrayed the role of Emily Stewart on As the World Turns, and the couple were married on May 25, 1996. They have three children, two daughters and a son. In 2015, Hensley and Menighan were divorced.

In the 1990s and early 2000s, Hensley was a resident of Old Tappan, New Jersey.

== See also ==
- As the World Turns
- Holden Snyder and Lily Walsh
- Supercouple
