= Noelle Beck =

American actress (born 1967)

- Born: December 14, 1967 (age 58); Baltimore, Maryland, U.S.
- Occupation: Actress
- Years active: 1983–present
- Spouse: Eric Petterson (m. 1990)
- Children: 3

Noelle Beck (born December 14, 1967) is an American actress, best known for her role as Trisha Alden on the ABC daytime soap opera Loving.

== Life and career ==
Beck was born in Baltimore, Maryland. She graduated from Baltimore School for the Arts. She portrayed Loving's Trisha Alden from December 1984 to March 26, 1993, returning briefly in 1995 as the series neared cancellation. On May 8, 2008, she took over the role of Lily Walsh on the CBS soap As the World Turns and remained until the series' cancellation on September 17, 2010.

In 1996, Beck was cast in the second season of the CBS primetime soap Central Park West as Jordan Tate. In 2000, she was a series regular on the comedy TV series Tucker. Beck also guest starred as Mr. Big's ex-wife Barbara in a first season episode of Sex and the City in July 1998.

Beck appeared on Law & Order and Law & Order: Special Victims Unit in 2000, on Law & Order: Criminal Intent in 2002, and returned in 2011 to Special Victims Unit and to Criminal Intent.

== Personal life ==
She is of Italian and German ancestry. Beck married Eric Petterson on August 5, 1990. They have two daughters, one born in 1991, and one in 1992, and a son born in 1998.

== Filmography ==
=== Film ===
Year	Title	Role	Notes
1989	Fletch Lives	Betty Lee Dilworth	
1996	The Substitute	Deidre Lane	
2005	Trust the Man	Flight Attendant	
2005	The Naked Brothers Band: The Movie	Katrina	
2007	If I Didn't Care	Janice Meyers	
2009	Frame of Mind	Linda	
2010	Wall Street: Money Never Sleeps	Bretton's Wife	
2014	Innocence	Sarah Wilson	

=== Television ===
Year	Title	Role	Notes
1985–1995	Loving	Patricia "Trisha" Alden Sowolsky Hartman McKenzie	Series regular: 1984 – April 12, 1993; 1995
1991–1992	All My Children	Trisha Alden McKenzie	4 Episodes: October 23 – 24, 1991; December 31, 1991 – January 2, 1992
1994	Golden Gate	Danie Addison	Television film
1994	Love on the Run	Ava Dietrich	Television film
1996	CPW	Jordan Tate	Main role (8 episodes)
1998	Spin City	Kaari the Magician	Episode: "The Lady or the Tiger"
1998	Sex and the City	Barbara	Episode: "Three's a Crowd"
2000	919 Fifth Avenue	Audrey Wildsmith	Television film
2000	Law & Order: Special Victims Unit	Stephanie Mulroney	Episode: "Entitled"
2000	Law & Order	Stephanie Mulroney	Episode: "Entitled: Part 2"
2000	Tucker	Jeannie Pierce	Main role (13 episodes)
2001	Big Apple	Kate Ryder	Episode: "1.7"
2002	Law & Order: Criminal Intent	Tina Davenport	Episode: "Tomorrow"
2004	My Sexiest Mistake	Andie	Television film
2005	Rescue Me	Mariel	4 episodes
2006	The Evidence	Inspector Jessica Sykes	2 episodes
2008	Cashmere Mafia	Cilla Gray	4 episodes
2008–2010	As the World Turns	Lily Walsh	Main role
2011	Blue Bloods	Sue Connors	3 episodes
2011	Law & Order: Criminal Intent	Deborah Brite	Episode: "Rispetto"
2011	Law & Order: Special Victims Unit	Dr. Audrey Shelton	Episode: "Bang"
2012	Person of Interest	Sydney Baylor	Episode: "Risk"
2012	Made in Jersey	Maureen Barnes	Episode: "The Farm"
2013–2014	The Carrie Diaries	Mrs. Kydd	5 episodes
2015	The Blacklist	Dr. Lauren Kimberly	Episode: "Karakurt (No. 55)"
