= Lily Walsh =

- As the World Turns character
- Martha Byrne as Lily Walsh
- Portrayed by: Lucy Deakins (1984–85); Martha Byrne (1985–1989, 1993–2008); Heather Rattray (1989–1992); Noelle Beck (2008–2010)
- Duration: 1984–2010
- First appearance: June 1984
- Last appearance: September 17, 2010
- Created by: Tom King and Millee Taggart
- Introduced by: Mary-Ellis Bunim
- Noelle Beck as Lily Walsh
In-universe information
- Other names: Lily Snyder
- Occupation: Possibly runs WorldWide; Former Partner in Carly Tenney's design business; Co-Owner of the Lakeview; Former Partner in Rosie's Roller Palace; Co-Owner of WOAK-TV; Former Manager of Valletta; Former Executive at Montgomery & Associates; Co-host of ‘’The Holden and Lily Show’’
- Father: Josh Stricklyn
- Mother: Iva Benedict
- Adoptive father: Martin Guest
- Adoptive mother: Lucinda Walsh
- Stepfather: Jason Benedict
- Sisters: Rose D'Angelo
- Half-brothers: M.J. Dixon
- Half-sisters: Sierra Estaban (adoptive); Bianca Walsh (adoptive)
- Spouse: Derek Mason (1987); Holden Snyder (1991–93, 1998–2009); Damian Grimaldi (1993–97, 2009–10); Diego Santana (1997)
- Sons: Luke Snyder; Ethan Snyder
- Daughters: Faith Snyder; Natalie Snyder
- Grandfathers: Harvey Snyder (adoptive); Jared Carpenter; Henry Snyder (adoptive); Cal Stricklyn
- Grandmothers: Emma Snyder (adoptive); Caroline Carpenter; Elizabeth Snyder; Gloria Walters Keller (adoptive)
- Uncles: Royce Keller (adoptive); Seth Snyder (adoptive); Holden Snyder (adoptive); Caleb Snyder (adoptive)
- Aunts: Elizabeth Carpenter; Samantha Anderson (adoptive); Neal Keller Alcott (adoptive); Meg Snyder (adoptive); Ellie Snyder (adoptive)
- Nephews: Bryant Montgomery (adoptive)
- Nieces: Lucy Montgomery (adoptive); Jade Taylor
- First cousins: Georgia Tucker Silva (adoptive); Abigail Williams (adoptive); Aaron Snyder (adoptive); Eliza Ryan (adoptive)

Lily Walsh is a fictional character from the CBS daytime soap opera, As the World Turns. Most notably played by Martha Byrne from May 1985 to September 29, 1989, and again from April 1993 to April 22, 2008, the character was originated in June 1984 by Lucy Deakins. Heather Rattray stepped into the role from December 24, 1989, to December 24, 1992. In the show's final two years, Lily was recast with Noelle Beck and she aired from May 8, 2008, after the much-publicized departure of Byrne until its final episode on September 17, 2010. Byrne is considered to be one of the most recognized faces of daytime television and is often called a "superstar" of soap opera history.

== Casting and characterization ==
=== Deakins, Byrne and Rattray's tenures ===
Lily Walsh was originally played by Lucy Deakins for 1984–1985. As the daughter of an acting coach, Deakins also entered the field and was cast on the show following her appearance in the play So What Are We Going To Do Now? as part of the Circle Repertory Company. After Deakins departed from the role, Martha Byrne initially assumed the character from 1985 to 1989 and became the most notable portrayer. Byrne, who was 15 at the time of her first appearance also had a background in theater as she appeared in the play Annie at the age of 10. Her early years were greatly involved in stories with Holden Snyder (Jon Hensley), with whom she is one half of the show's most popular and well-received love stories. Byrne is also an accomplished singer, having written and performed the song "Find My Way Back" as part of her album The Other Side in tribute of Holden and Lily and her co-star Hensley. The song made its television debut on the December 5, 2005 episode as a montage of clips played of Holden and Lily through the years.

Byrne commented on her song "Find My Way Back" and her inspiration behind its creation during an interview with Soapdom.com columnist Laura DeBrizzi on December 1, 2005.

"About a year ago, I decided that I really wanted to write something for Holden and Lily since the couple has been together for so long – 20 years. Plus, having come this far and still being with Jon (Hensley, Holden), both as an actor and a friend, I thought now would be the perfect time."

—Martha Byrne, Soapdom.com

Byrne departed the role and Heather Rattray took over from 1989 to 1993 and took the character in a different direction with a colder personality following a fire. Rattray had a small role in the CBS soap opera Guiding Light as Wendy in 1988 and led a primetime career before and after her time on ATWT. The show's then-head writer Douglas Marland lured Byrne back to the role when Rattray announced her departure.

=== Byrne's second run ===
Martha Byrne's second run on the show proved to be her most successful as she took on the role of Lily's twin sister Rose D'Angelo initially from 2000 to 2003 and continued to play in role until 2006 with various appearances. Lily and Rose's characters were often involved in storylines with Holden and Dusty Donovan (Grayson McCouch) and Rose's presence continued to be felt in Lily's life until her death in 2003. Byrne was nominated for several Daytime Emmy Awards and won for Outstanding Ingenue in 1987 and Outstanding Lead Actress in 2001. After nearly 20 years in the role, Byrne left the show after her contract negotiations with the show's executive producer Christopher Goutman "took a turn for the worse." Byrne reportedly left the show when she was not guaranteed the same number of episodes she contractually received a year earlier and was upset that an audition breakdown was released to recast the role during negotiations.

When Byrne left the role, she spoke with the New York Daily News about her appreciation from the fans and feelings about the show.

"I want to thank all the loyal fans who, over the course of two decades, have unconditionally supported me and the characters of Lily and [her late twin] Rose," she continued. "It was a wonderful journey, one I sincerely hoped would continue. I consider myself fortunate to have shared so many years with you."

—Martha Byrne, New York Daily News

Byrne last aired on April 22, 2008 but continued to make her presence known within the daytime community. In 2009, she began a three-episode stint as a writer for CBS' The Bold and the Beautiful after sending some writing samples to the show's executive producer and head writer Bradley Bell. After her writing duties came to an end, Byrne returned to acting and appeared on ABC's General Hospital as Andrea Floyd that same year. Her character was completely different than her ATWT role and this was often cited in comparison to both roles. Andrea was eventually killed off after being hit by a car driven by Edward Quartermaine (played by John Ingle) after Andrea poisoned him, technically bringing on her own death. Byrne eventually created the web series Gotham: The Series, which premiered on November 23, 2009, and starred many ATWT and GL cast members. Byrne's web series debut also mirrored the new addition to the web series Venice: The Series, created and starring Crystal Chappell of Guiding Light. Byrne continued her filmmaking career with former ATWT co-star Paul Leyden, who played the role of Simon Frasier when they premiered their short film "Bye Bye Sally" in 2010. The film starred their former co-star Paolo Seganti, who portrayed Damian Grimaldi and Malin Åkerman, best known for her roles in the feature films The Heartbreak Kid, 27 Dresses and Watchmen.

=== Beck's tenure ===
On March 26, 2008, Noelle Beck was named Byrne's replacement and first aired in the role on May 8 of that year. Beck previously played the role of Trisha Alden on the ABC soap opera Loving from 1985 to 1993 and again in 1995 in time for its finale. Before joining ATWT, Beck led an impressive career in primetime that included roles in CBS' Central Park West, NBC's Tucker and many guest appearances on other series including ABC's Cashmere Mafia.

Beck's casting came with criticism due to the actress replacing the popular Byrne. With columnist Michael Fairman, Beck spoke about her initial hesitance to rejoin daytime after nearly 15-year break and her approach to playing the character of Lily.

"I hadn't been involved in daytime for quite awhile [sic?]. I left in 1993 and there was a big long gap since I returned. I was raising my children and not watching a lot of daytime TV. So I forgot how committed and loyal soap fans are, because a lot of the work I did after I left "Loving" was episodics and pilots. People don't have that kind of loyalty to characters like in soaps, because you are not in their homes every day."

—Noelle Beck, Michael Fairman On-Air On Soaps

In the same interview, Beck further added:

"When I did daytime before, they didn't have any blogs. So I didn't know when people didn't like me. Ignorance is bliss. I was like, 'I think this is fun,' and then I was reading a lot of negative stuff. It's hard not to take it personally. Than I thought, 'You know what? I am not going to do this to myself. I'm just going to do the best job I can."

—Noelle Beck

Following the final episode of ATWT, Beck continued to appear in primetime with guest appearances on CBS' Blue Bloods, NBC's Law & Order: Special Victims Unit and USA Network's Law & Order: Criminal Intent, which also starred Jay Mohr in a Charlie Sheen rant-inspired episode.

== Storylines ==
Lily showed up in Oakdale as the daughter of Lucinda Walsh. Upon arriving, she quickly hit it off with Dusty Donovan who wound up becoming her first boyfriend. The Lily and Dusty romance also created real-life memories for Lily's portrayer Martha Byrne, who shared her first kiss with Dusty's portrayer Brian Bloom. Lily's most notable pairing was with Holden Snyder, whom she met after he began work at her mother's stables. In 1987, Lily learned Lucinda was not her biological mother as she adopted her and was the biological daughter of Iva Snyder and Joshua Snyder-Stricklyn. Lily and Holden were thought to be related but it was revealed that her biological parents were only adopted into the Snyder family. The romance blossomed and suffered various tribulations and two divorces. The pair is considered to be the central couple ever to be featured on the show and Byrne, along with Holden's portrayer Jon Hensley have become one of daytime's most popular supercouples Lily had a twin sister, Rose D'Angelo who died in 2006, which caused her and Holden to nearly divorce before he began a relationship with Julia Larrabee, who was eventually killed by injected bee venom by her ex-husband Les Sweeney. Many other well-remembered stories include her addiction, recovery and relapse with diet pills and the presumed death of her first love Dusty.

In 1993, Lily married Damian Gramaldi and while married to him, she engaged in an affair with her ex-husband Holden. Eventually Lily ended her marriage to Damian to return to Holden. With Damian, Lily is the mother of Luke Snyder, whom Holden adopted. Luke's struggles always lead Lily and Holden to offer their support as their son faced life after coming out as gay, a storyline which forced a recast with Van Hansis taking over for Jake Weary, the son of Guiding Light actress Kim Zimmer. Lily's other children are Faith Snyder, Natalie Snyder and Ethan Snyder with Holden. Lily's and Holden's adoptive relations have been a factor in their relationships since her biological mother Iva is Holden's adoptive sister, making her Holden's adoptive niece and Holden's mother Emma Snyder is also Lily's grandmother through Iva as well as her mother-in-law. When Holden adopted Luke, the arrangement made Luke a second cousin to his mother. In early 2010, Damian went missing and presumed dead, but he in fact faked his death in order to frame Holden. The truth was discovered and Damian was furious and then resurfaced and involved Lily's daughter Faith in his scheme. Once Faith revealed Damian's alive, he kidnapped Lily and tried to convince her to reunite with him, but she told him off as her nemesis Molly Conlan and Holden arrived and rescued her. Lily's marriage to Damian when Holden was presumed dead had become too much for Holden to accept and they spent time away from one another. By the end of the show, it appeared that the couple were moving toward a reconciliation to get back together.
