= 31st Daytime Emmy Awards =

- Date: May 21, 2004 (Ceremony); May 15, 2004 (Creative Arts Awards)
- Location: Radio City Music Hall, New York City
- Presented by: National Academy of Television Arts and Sciences
- Hosted by: Vanessa Marcil

Highlights
- Outstanding Drama Series: The Young and the Restless
- Outstanding Game Show: The Price Is Right

Television/radio coverage
- Network: NBC

The 31st Daytime Emmy Awards, commemorating excellence in American daytime programming from 2003, was held on May 21, 2004 at Radio City Music Hall in New York City, Vanessa Marcil hosted. Creative Arts Emmy Awards were presented on May 15, 2004. It is the last Daytime Emmy Awards ceremony to have aired on NBC. The nominees were announced on May 4, 2004.

== Nominations and winners ==
The following is a partial list of nominees, with winners in bold:

=== Outstanding Drama Series ===
- As the World Turns
- The Bold and the Beautiful
- General Hospital
- Guiding Light
- **The Young and the Restless**

=== Outstanding Lead Actor in a Drama Series ===
- Grant Aleksander (Phillip Spaulding, Guiding Light)
- Maurice Benard (Sonny Corinthos, General Hospital)
- Eric Braeden (Victor Newman, The Young and the Restless)
- **Anthony Geary (Luke Spencer, General Hospital)**
- Roger Howarth (Paul Ryan, As the World Turns)
- Thorsten Kaye (Ian Thornhart, Port Charles)

=== Outstanding Lead Actress in a Drama Series ===
- Tamara Braun (Carly Corinthos, General Hospital)
- Nancy Lee Grahn (Alexis Davis, General Hospital)
- **Michelle Stafford (Phyllis Abbott, The Young and the Restless)**
- Maura West (Carly Snyder, As the World Turns)
- Kim Zimmer (Reva Lewis, Guiding Light)

=== Outstanding Supporting Actor in a Drama Series ===
- William deVry (Michael Cambias, All My Children)
- **Rick Hearst (Ric Lansing, General Hospital)**
- Christian LeBlanc (Michael Baldwin, The Young and the Restless)
- Ron Raines (Alan Spaulding, Guiding Light)
- James Reynolds (Abe Carver, Days of Our Lives)

=== Outstanding Supporting Actress in a Drama Series ===
- Kathy Brier (Marcie Walsh, One Life to Live)
- Sharon Case (Sharon Newman, The Young and the Restless)
- Ilene Kristen (Roxy Balsom, One Life to Live)
- **Cady McClain (Rosanna Cabot, As the World Turns)**
- Heather Tom (Victoria Newman, The Young and the Restless)

=== Outstanding Younger Actor in a Drama Series ===
- **Chad Brannon (Zander Smith, General Hospital)**
- Scott Clifton (Dillon Quartermaine, General Hospital)
- Agim Kaba (Aaron Snyder, As the World Turns)
- David Lago (Raul Guittierez, The Young and the Restless)
- Brian Presley (Jack Ramsey, Port Charles)

=== Outstanding Younger Actress in a Drama Series ===
- **Jennifer Finnigan (Bridget Forrester, The Bold and the Beautiful)**
- Christel Khalil (Lily Winters, The Young and the Restless)
- Eden Riegel (Bianca Montgomery, All My Children)
- Alicia Leigh Willis (Courtney Matthews, General Hospital)
- Lauren Woodland (Brittany Hodges, The Young and the Restless)

=== Outstanding Drama Series Writing Team ===
- All My Children
- **As the World Turns**
- General Hospital
- The Young and the Restless

=== Outstanding Drama Series Directing Team ===
- **General Hospital**
- One Life to Live
- Passions
- The Young and the Restless

=== Outstanding Game/Audience Participation Show ===
- Jeopardy!
- **The Price is Right**
- Who Wants to be a Millionaire

=== Outstanding Game Show Host ===
- **Bob Barker, The Price is Right**
- Alex Trebek, Jeopardy!
- Meredith Vieira, Who Wants to be a Millionaire

=== Outstanding Talk Show ===
- Dr. Phil
- **The Ellen DeGeneres Show**
- Live With Regis and Kelly
- The View
- The Wayne Brady Show

=== Outstanding Talk Show Host ===
- **Wayne Brady, The Wayne Brady Show**
- Ellen DeGeneres, The Ellen DeGeneres Show
- Phil McGraw, Dr. Phil
- Regis Philbin and Kelly Ripa, Live With Regis and Kelly
- Barbara Walters, Meredith Vieira, Star Jones and Joy Behar, The View

=== Outstanding Service Show ===
- Essence of Emeril
- Great Hotels
- **Martha Stewart Living**
- The Suze Orman Show
- This Old House

=== Outstanding Service Show Host ===
- Bobby Flay, Boy Meets Grill
- Emeril Lagasse, Essence of Emeril
- Kevin O'Connor, This Old House
- **Suze Orman, The Suze Orman Show**
- Martha Stewart, Martha Stewart Living

=== Outstanding Special Class Series ===
- Animal Rescue with Alex Paen
- A Baby Story
- Judge Judy
- Trading Spaces: Boys vs. Girls
- **When I Was a Girl**

=== Outstanding Children's Animated Program ===
- Arthur
- Dora the Explorer
- Kim Possible
- **Little Bill**
- Rugrats

=== Outstanding Special Class Animated Program ===
- Duck Dodgers
- Fillmore!
- Ozzy & Drix
- Rolie Polie Olie
- Static Shock
- **Tutenstein**

=== Outstanding Individual Achievement in Animation ===
- **Dan Kuenster** (Jakers! The Adventures of Piggley Winks)

=== Outstanding Music Direction and Composition ===
- **Richard Wolf** (Static Shock)
- Mike Renzi, Glen Daum, Stephen Lawrence, Tony Geiss, Dave Conner, and Danny Epstein (Sesame Street)
- Paul Jacobs, Christopher Cerf, Sarah Durkee, Thomas Z. Shepard, Fred Newman, Sharon Lerner, and Chris Cardillo (Between the Lions)
- Michael Rubin and Nick Balaban (Blue's Clues)
- Van Dyke Parks and Kevin Kiner (Stuart Little: The Animated Series)
- Peter Michael Escovedo (The Wayne Brady Show)

=== Outstanding Performer In An Animated Program ===
- **Joe Alaskey (Duck Dodgers, Duck Dodgers)**
- Nancy Cartwright, (Rufus, Kim Possible)
- Walter Cronkite (Benjamin Franklin, Liberty's Kids)
- John Ritter (Clifford, Clifford the Big Red Dog)
- Henry Winkler (Norville, Clifford's Puppy Days)

=== Outstanding Pre-School Children's Series ===
- Bear in the Big Blue House
- Blue's Clues
- **Sesame Street**

=== Outstanding Children's Series ===
- **Assignment Discovery**
- Between the Lions
- Jeff Corwin Unleashed
- Operation Junkyard
- Scout's Safari
- ZOOM

=== Outstanding Performer in a Children's Series ===
- Kevin Clash (Elmo, Sesame Street)
- **Jeff Corwin (Himself, Jeff Corwin Unleashed)**
- David Rudman (Cookie Monster, Sesame Street)
- Lynne Thigpen (Luna, Bear in the Big Blue House)
- Michelle Trachtenberg (Host/Narrator, Truth or Scare)

=== Lifetime Achievement Award ===
The Lifetime Achievement Award was awarded to 10 veteran soap opera performers in recognition of their many years of service to the genre:

1. Rachel Ames (Audrey Hardy, General Hospital, 1964–2007, 2009, 2013, 2015)
2. John Clarke (Mickey Horton, Days of our Lives, 1965–2004)
3. Jeanne Cooper (Katherine Chancellor, The Young and the Restless, 1973–2013)
4. Eileen Fulton (Lisa Grimaldi, As the World Turns, 1960–1964, 1966–1983, 1984–2010)
5. Don Hastings (Bob Hughes, As the World Turns, 1960–2010)
6. Anna Lee* (Lila Quartermaine, General Hospital, 1978–2003)
7. Ray MacDonnell (Joe Martin, All My Children, 1970–2010, 2011, 2013)
8. Frances Reid (Alice Horton, Days of our Lives, 1965–2007)
9. Helen Wagner (Nancy Hughes, As the World Turns, 1956–2010)
10. Ruth Warrick (Phoebe Tyler Wallingford, All My Children, 1970–2005)

* - Anna Lee died a week before the awards ceremony and was honored with a brief moment during the telecast. Her award was accepted on her behalf by her son, actor Jeffrey Byron.
