= Ellen Lowell =

- As the World Turns character
- Patricia Bruder as Ellen Lowell in 1995
- Portrayed by: Wendy Drew (1956–60); Patricia Bruder (1960–95, 1998)
- Duration: 1956–95, 1998
- First appearance: April 2, 1956
- Last appearance: November 30, 1998
- Created by: Irna Phillips
In-universe information
- Occupation: Retired
- Parents: James "Jim" Lowell Jr. Claire English
- Spouse: Timothy "Tim" Cole; David Stewart (1966–91)
- Children: Dan Stewart; Annie Stewart Ward; Dawn Stewart
- Grandchildren: Elizabeth "Betsy" Stewart; Emily Stewart; Gregory Ward; Lowell Ward; Maria Ward; Nancy Ward

Ellen Lowell (previously Cole and Stewart) is a fictional character from the American daytime soap opera As the World Turns. She was portrayed by Wendy Drew from the series first episode on April 2, 1956 until September 1960 and by Patricia Bruder from December 1960 until November 1998.

== Casting ==
Wendy Drew initially played Ellen from 1956 until 1960, when Patricia Bruder took over the role. When Drew requested to be released from her contract as she was getting married, the fictional Ellen was sent away on a cruise, and returned played by Bruder. Bruder appeared in As the World Turns for 35 years. Alongside Eileen Fulton and Don Hastings, who played Lisa Grimaldi and Bob Hughes respectively, Bruder was one of the serial's longest-serving cast members. In 1990, a party was organised to honor the longevity of these and other cast members, and viewers were invited to attend to the event. In 1995, Bruder was "let go" from the serial. In 1998, Bruder returned to the serial to play Ellen once again.

== Development ==
As The World Turns initially focused on two families: the Hugheses and the Lowells. Ellen's father, Jim Lowell (Les Damon), was one of the soap's original protagonists. An early plot featured an affair between Jim and Edith Hughes (Ruth Warrick). Creator Irna Phillips had intended to contravene the typical format of soap opera storylines by allowing the affair to lead to a happy marriage, however ultimately killed Jim off instead. This resulted in younger members of the Lowell and Hughes families, including Ellen, being brought to the forefront of storylines. Ellen had been horrified by her father's affair, and as Marilyn J. Matelski writes in The Soap Opera Evolution, this, alongside her doubt as to whether her parents truly loved her, set Ellen on a "somewhat reckless [path ... seeking] love and security from any source". In 1958, Ellen became pregnant by Dr. Tim Cole (William Redfield) and subsequently gave their son up for adoption. According to The Daytime Serials of Television, 1946–1960, she was the first major character in any serial to have an illegitimate child. Lynda Hirsch summarised Ellen's following storylines:

After Tim [...] divorced his wife, he and Ellen married. But Tim died of a blood ailment shortly after the wedding. Meanwhile David and his wife Betty Stewart had adopted [Ellen and Tim's son] Dan and also had a natural son named Paul. Betty died and David hired a housekeeper to raise his boys. Ellen learned where Dan was and tried to win custody but the court denied her motion. Several years later, David fell in love with Ellen and they married, but not before Ellen murdered his house-keeper Franny Brennon.

— Lynda Hirsch, Youngstown Vindicator.

The Stewarts became a prominent family in the serial in the 1960s, and members of the Lowell family were written out in their favor. David and Ellen had two daughters together, Carol Ann (later known as Annie) and Dawn, later known as Dee; the roles of their family unit increased during this period. Over the course of the decade, Ellen's son Dan Stewart was rapidly aged. When Bruder joined the serial in 1960, both she and Ellen were in their early twenties. By 1966, Dan was also in his twenties—his portrayer John Colenback was only a year younger than Bruder. Bruder's costume and in-character appearance were altered to complement Ellen's aging. Copious amounts of grey powder were used, and she began dressing in old fashioned outfits and wearing her hair in a French twist. In 1979, Jon Reed of the Star-Banner described Ellen as "matronly", and reported that Bruder wore little make-up, and applied white powder to her hair. For a brief period in 1980, Bruder tried styling Ellen's hair after her own and wearing it loose. She changed it back, however, after receiving dozens of letters from viewers who felt that the style was inappropriate given the "mother image" which Ellen had gained.

== Reception ==
In 1988, Mary Anne Cooper of The Madison Courier described Ellen as one of the serial's "popular characters". In one storyline Ellen discovers that she has been caring for her long-lost son. Michael Maloney of The Huffington Post questioned the chances of someone babysitting an infant and it turning out to be their long-lost child. He noted that the character then went through a series of "trials and tribulations" in her unsuccessful battle to gain custody of Dan. He opined that Ellen and David were "one of Oakdale's more stable duos" and that the "bouffant hairdo" was a trademark of the character's image. In 1982, a columnist for The Tuscaloosa News said that "Ellen Stewart has had many problems lately" and that she really needed a friend in the series. They said the serial came up with "the best" when they cast Betsy Palmer as her best friend, Suzanne Becker.

== Bibliography ==
- Cox, Jim (2006). The Daytime Serials of Television, 1946–1960. McFarland & Company. ISBN 978-0-7864-2429-0.
- Matelski, Marilyn J. (1988). The Soap Opera Evolution: America's Enduring Romance With Daytime Drama. McFarland & Company. ISBN 978-0-89950-324-0.
- Museum of Television & Radio (1997). Worlds Without End: The Art and History of the Soap Opera. Abrams Books. ISBN 978-0-8109-3997-4.
- Schemering, Christopher (1985). The Soap Opera Encyclopedia. Ballantine Books. ISBN 978-0-345-32459-7.
