= Kim Sullivan Hughes =

- As the World Turns character
- Portrayed by: Kathryn Hays
- Duration: 1972–2010
- First appearance: August 31, 1972
- Last appearance: September 17, 2010
- Created by: David Lesan and Irna Phillips
- Introduced by: Freddie Bartholomew
In-universe information
- Other names: Kimberly Sullivan; Kim Reynolds; Kim Dixon; Kim Stewart; Kim Andropoulous
- Occupation: Co-owner of WOAK-TV
- Mother: Frances Sullivan
- Sisters: Jennifer Ryan Hughes
- Spouse: Jason Reynolds; John Dixon (1973–76); Dan Stewart (1977–79); Nick Andropoulous (1981–82); Bob Hughes (1985–)
- Sons: Andrew Dixon; Christopher Hughes II
- Daughters: Sabrina Hughes
- Stepdaughters: Frannie Hughes
- Granddaughters: Hope Dixon
- Nieces and nephews: Rick Ryan; Barbara Ryan; Melinda Grey; Frannie Hughes
- Other relatives: Paul Ryan; Jennifer Munson; Will Munson; Johnny Dixon; Jennifer Ryan; Johnny Montgomery; Hallie Munson (adoptive)

Kim Sullivan Hughes (formerly Reynolds, Dixon, Stewart, Andropoulus, and Hughes) is a fictional character on the CBS soap opera As the World Turns. The character was portrayed by Kathryn Hays continuously from 1972. Kim was created by soap opera legend Irna Phillips and was based on Irna's own personality. She soon became one of As the World Turns's most popular characters. First appearing in August 1972, the actress become the fourth longest serving cast member on the show after Helen Wagner (Nancy Hughes), Don Hastings (Bob Hughes), and Eileen Fulton (Lisa Grimaldi) when the show finished on air on September 17, 2010.

Kim's storylines often revolve around the core Hughes family. The character is portrayed as strong, fiery, sensitive and mother figure who in recent years has taken on the role as the Hughes' matriarch. Throughout her almost 40-year run on the show, Kim has endured several love interests, health issues including open heart surgery and amnesia whilst making the change from adulterous home-wrecker to matriarchal figure. Princeton's Bureau County Republican said the character had "grown over the decades and survived the typical drama of complicated soap plots."

== Creation and casting ==
=== Characterisation ===
Kathryn Hays was cast as the single, marriage-wrecking Kim Sullivan in 1972 by Irna Phillips. Various accounts have suggested that Kim is, in some ways, representative of Phillips herself. Phillips had written an earlier story on Another World for the character Pat Randolph that had also paralleled her own life.

"I don't know if she modelled Kim after herself," Hays said in an interview. "Don [Hastings] once said to me that Irna Philips saw something in me, or something that spoke to her in some ways. I don’t really know...I was really terrified of her to tell you the truth."

"Kim was written as a troublemaker. She was going to come in and cause trouble for Dr. Bob and Jennifer, Kim’s sister. Irna turned that into someone who had depth and evolved into Kim. For me as an actor, it started one way and then turned into someone else."

"She turned into a deeper character, and that was wonderful. I was playing a character who had had a rough patch in her life but she made the choice to be a better person and to not be selfish. She made the choice to be thoughtful of others. You saw her grow through those years."

Hays said it was always reassuring to know that if Kim got pushed too far, or too hard, "she could turn around and deck you. Verbally, not physically."

== Character development and impact ==
=== Early storylines ===
Kim evolved from an adulterous sister to a loving member of the Oakdale community. She first arrived in Oakdale for her sister Jennifer's wedding to Bob Hughes in late 1972, she fell in love with Bob as he also began to share feelings for Kim. Bob and Jennifer's marriage was at a strain due to the behavior of Jennifer's son Rick, Bob took a break to Florida and Kim who still had feelings for Bob followed him there and pretended that she had met him out of pure coincidence. Eventually Kim and Bob shared a one-night stand together and then the two returned to Oakdale where Jennifer announced she was pregnant with Bob's child. However Kim was also pregnant with Bob's child but she didn't want to hurt Jennifer so she married Bob's rival Dr. John Dixon. At this stage, show creator Irna Phillips planned to have Bob leave Jennifer for Kim, this caused outrage among viewers who thought Kim should've been "punished" for her adultery. CBS asked Irna to reconsider but Irna refused, they were forced to dismiss her as head writer. At that time, the story had Kim gave birth to a stillborn baby.

=== Marital rape ===
Kim never really loved John as she was really in love with Bob. In frustration with their lackluster marriage, John raped Kim and marital rape was not illegal in those days so Kim couldn't press charges against him. Kim stayed in her marriage to keep her sister Jennifer happy.

"I didn’t even realize that was controversial. But it was.."

— —Kathryn Hays

"It didn’t register with me how important this story was. I thought that relationship certainly served us well throughout the years. It was such a love-hate relationship. That only happened because of what we made out of it. It was so much about how Larry [Bryggman] would approach the scene. Because they would write some brutal things for him. He would then take them and pull it around in such a way that it would be so poignant, so that the reaction could only be one of compassion. That became the way we would function. At the end of one of these scenes, he said to Kim, “If you would be nicer to me, I will be nicer to you.” That was in a scene that was written as nasty. Instead of being nasty and brutal, he would temper it. He said that to me in a way that broke my heart. That is what made it interesting. In his terrible clumsy way he really loved Kim. He just wasn't good at being loving.

=== Jennifer's death ===
Jennifer and Bob were happy until Jennifer discovered that she was dying of a rare disease of the central nervous system. Later it went into remission, but tragedy struck for Kim in 1975 when Jennifer died in a car accident. One day she had enough of John's controlling antics and ran out of the house. John followed but fell down the stairs. Kim then stayed with John out of guilt but she had started to fall in love with Dr. Dan Stewart. John faked his illness when he recovered and this forced Kim to leave him. Kim fled to a cabin and while writing a love letter to Dan a tornado struck and she sustained an injury that caused amnesia. John then pretended to Kim that he had the perfect marriage with her. John limited her contact with the outside world, thinking that her memory would return. When Kim regained her memory she discovered she was pregnant with John's baby as he had taken advantage of her memory loss. Kim then left John to be with Dr. Dan Stewart.

=== Dr. Dan Stewart and Nick Andropolous ===
Kim got together with Dan Stewart with resistance from his estranged wife Susan and married, in 1976, Kim gave birth to Andy Dixon and in 1978 married Dan. Tragedy struck in nearly 1979 for Kim when Dan was experiencing bad headaches and was diagnosed with a brain tumor. When Dan's illness grew worse, they went on vacation but were stumbled upon by criminals Roy Barker and Chip Kelley who were robbing a store. The latter of the two was killed and Barker held them hostage, Dan disarmed him eventually and he was arrested, sadly the next day for Kim was even worse when Dan died. Kim found comfort in Oakdale's newest business man, Nick Andropolous who was running a Greek restaurant in Oakdale. Kim reminded Nick of his dead wife, this was confirmed when his brother Steve arrived in town, he was shocked when he saw Kim who resembled his brother's dead wife. Kim and Nick then planned to get married but a problem arose, Nick's dead wife Andrea wasn't dead, Andrea eventually allowed a divorce and Kim and Nick married. Kim's stepdaughter by Dan, Betsy was now seeing Steve who was a bad egg and was now involved in smuggling drugs. Betsy and Steve refused to see reason and ran away, Nick found them and threatened to kill Steve in furious anger, Nick made Betsy swear not to see Steve again which she did, then Nick sadly collapsed and died of a heart attack, leaving Kim a widow by three men, Jason Reynolds, Dan, and Nick.

=== Marriage to Bob, Frannie and Sabrina, and Bob's affair with Susan ===
Kim married Bob Hughes in 1985. Shortly after their wedding, she and Frannie were involved in a mystery which eventually revealed Douglas Cummings as Kim's admirer. Douglas kidnapped Kim and Frannie, and was ultimately murdered. Kim believed Frannie may have been responsible, and claimed she did it to protect Frannie (ultimately, Marsha Talbot was revealed as the killer).

In 1986, Kim gave birth to her and Bob's son, Christopher. Not long after, they heard from Frannie, who had seen a woman in the UK that looked like her. Kim, Bob and Frannie eventually learned that the woman, Sabrina Fullerton, was Bob and Kim's daughter. John Dixon and Memorial hospital staff had a role in taking Sabrina away as an infant and getting her out of the country. Sabrina tried to become part of the Hughes family, but stirred up conflict and came between Frannie and her then-boyfriend, Seth Snyder.

A few years later, Bob and Kim drifted apart. Bob was feeling left out as Kim and John tried to deal with their son Andy's alcoholism. The strain led to Bob having an affair with an old friend and coworker (and Kim's rival) Dr. Susan Stewart. Though Kim threw him out of the house, she eventually forgave him and their marriage remained on solid ground.

=== Hospitalizations ===
In 1997, Kim underwent a life-threatening heart valve replacement surgery, something sure to alter her and Bob's life for years. During this time she had an out of body experience where she would see her life if she had died on the operating table. In addition, Kim was injured in a church bombing and was in a coma for a time. She recovered with a new appreciation for her family and friends and a new commitment to make a difference in their lives. On this note, Kim donated her bone marrow to Hope Snyder. Kim was later shocked to learn that Hope was her very own granddaughter.

=== Chris' return ===
Chris, now a young doctor, fell in love with the teenaged Alison Stewart, Susan's youngest daughter. Kim didn't seem to have a problem with the relationship until the couple decided to move in together—into the Hughes' home. However the relationship didn't workout, and after divorcing, Chris left Oakdale. Hays said during this storyline came one of her favourite scenes with actress Marie Masters (Susan Stewart).
"When Chris married Alison. Marie and I had a scene where I went to her house, we were talking about our kids Chris and Ally. Kim was trying to make peace, trying to be reasonable, and Susan was having none of it. We got down to the floor and were getting ready to tape. In rehearsal, Marie had added a line at the end, “Be sure to say hello to Bob for me.” It was a real dig at Kim. At the end of rehearsal it made me so mad, as Kim. I knew what I felt like doing, and I didn't do it at rehearsal. But I knew that if she said that during the taping that I would was going to let it fly. So we’re taping this thing, it had gone well. Kim was going to the door, and Susan said, “Be sure to hello to Bob for me.” I yelled, “Oh go to hell!” and slammed the door."

=== Bob's stroke ===
A few years later, Kim was elated when Chris returned. However, she had concerns that he was back with Emily Stewart. However, Emily would be the least of Kim’s worries. Upon arriving in town, Chris was at loggerheads with Bob over a research project conducted by Evan Walsh IV. While Chris felt the project was cutting-edge and would help people in the end, Bob felt it was far too risky. Though Bob had intended to groom Chris to eventually take over as Chief of Staff, Chris’s arrogant ambitiousness unsettled Bob. Later, Bob was unexpectedly struck down by a stroke. At Kim’s insistence, Chris was sworn in as interim Chief of Staff despite his lack of experience. Though Dusty Donovan accused Chris of causing Bob’s stroke, Chris was exonerated, and humbled, when the true culprit turned out to be Evan. In the meantime, after six weeks, Bob finally woke up from his coma and made a full recovery.

=== Later years and Bob's retirement ===
Despite his brush with death, Bob continued to work long hours at the hospital, frustrating Kim. The final straw came when Bob refused to take a vacation and go away with Kim to the cabin for their anniversary. At the same time, while planning a special surprise for Bob and Kim, Tom and Margo discovered that Bob and Kim weren't legally married. The family proposed holding a quickie ceremony the following day, but an upset Kim revealed that she might not want to marry Bob at all. Luckily, the family was able to convince the pair to reconcile and Bob and Kim married again in a beautiful ceremony with their family present. Months later, Bob finally took Kim’s wishes to heart and retired in the final episode of As The World Turns.

"It was the moment I realized that Kim wouldn’t be there anymore [tearful]. It was such a shock to me. It was just a shock to me."

— —Kathryn Hays

Hays said news of the cancellation of the show come as a shock to her. "It was the moment I realized that Kim wouldn’t be there anymore [tearful]. It was such a shock to me. It was just a shock to me."

On filming her final episode in 2010, Hays said the last day was incredibly "poignant".
“The last day was poignant, and what was so incredible about it was how we shot pretty much in order that day. As each group finished with a scene, that would be the end of their involvement. But it wasn’t like tomorrow was another show, so the studio got really full. By the time they got to our scenes with Don and myself, there was hardly any room for cameras or the boom. In a way, it felt like being in a theater. We don’t normally have an audience. The stage manager asked if it was going to be a problem for us, but we both said no. It was like everybody’s arm was around us. It was absolutely incredible, there was not a sound. It was like everyone was holding their breath. In a way, we were all doing it together. When we finished, Don and I both spoke a little bit to everybody, and the whole As the World Turns family moved to the other end of big studio where they had the world’s longest table set up, covered with champagne glasses."
