= Patricia Bruder =

American actress (born 1937)

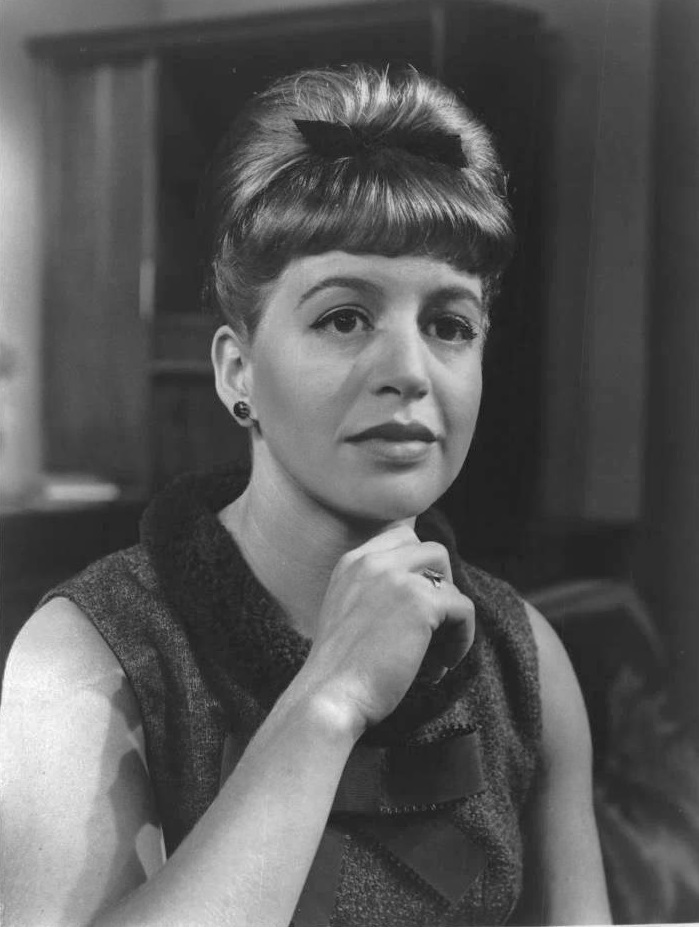
- Bruder as Ellen Lowell in As the World Turns (1966)
- Born: April 14, 1937 (age 89); Brooklyn, New York, U.S.
- Other name: Patsy Bruder
- Occupation: Actress
- Years active: 1946–1998
- Spouse: Dr. Charles Debrovner (m. 1959)
- Children: 2

Patricia Bruder (born April 14, 1937) is an American actress. She is known for playing the role of Ellen Lowell on the CBS Daytime soap opera As the World Turns (1960 to 1975, 1976 to 1995, 1998).

== Early life ==
Bruder was born in Brooklyn, New York. She decided to become an actress when she was 9 years old, after becoming involved in drama at camp. Her mother began taking her to auditions. She won her first role, singing in the chorus on the radio show Rainbow House. She then joined the cast of another radio show, Juvenile Jury. When the show transitioned from radio to television, Bruder stayed in the cast. She attended James Madison High School. She enrolled at Columbia University, studying drama.

== Career ==
At the age of 13, Bruder became an understudy for the role of Flora in The Innocents on Broadway. When the play launched a tour, she took over the part. In her early career, she was billed as Patsy Bruder. She appeared on television, guest starring on Robert Montgomery Presents, Studio One, Suspense, and Kraft Television Theatre.

Bruder played Elspeth McNairn in the original Broadway cast of Lace on Her Petticoat. The play ran from September 4 to November 10, 1951 at the Booth Theatre in New York. She appeared in Off-Broadway productions of Livin' the Life and The King and the Duke. Bruder was cast as Marjorie May in the original Broadway cast of Gypsy, co-starring with Ethel Merman. The musical ran from May 21, 1959 to March 25, 1961 at the Broadway Theatre in New York.

Her performance in Gypsy caught the attention of producers of the CBS soap opera As the World Turns. She was cast as Ellen Lowell (later known as Ellen Stewart). Bruder replaced Wendy Drew, an original cast member who had played the role since 1956. Bruder began airing as Ellen in December 1960. The character was paired romantically with Dr. David Stewart (Henderson Forsythe). Bruder left the show for a brief time in 1975, returning in 1976.

During her time on As the World Turns, she continued to work in theater. In 1961, she appeared Off-Broadway in The Sap of Life. In 1977, Bruder produced and starred in The Miracle Worker. Her two daughters also appeared in the play. She also had a role in The Effect of Gamma Rays on Man-in-the-Moon Marigolds at New York's Theater in the Park.

In 1995, Bruder was dismissed from her role on As the World Turns, but she returned in 1998. She last aired in the role on November 30, 1998. Since leaving As the World Turns, she has done voice-over work. Bruder is a member of the New York Society for Ethical Culture and she is a producer for their Ethics and Theater program. On June 17, 2024 she performed the song "Time and Time Again" at a benefit for the American Popular Song Society at New York's The Cutting Room. Richard Maltby Jr. and David Shire were receiving a Lifetime Achievement Award and she had originally performed the song in their musical, The Sap of Life, in 1961.

== Personal life ==
In June 1959, she married Dr. Charles Debrovner, a gynecologist. They first met when they were both in high school. They have two daughters, born in 1965 and 1968.
