= Bob Hughes =

Soap character

- As the World Turns character
- Don Hastings as Bob Hughes
- Portrayed by: Bobby Alford (1956–1958); Ronnie Welch (1958–1960); Don Hastings (1960–2010)
- Duration: 1956–2010
- First appearance: April 2, 1956
- Last appearance: September 17, 2010
- Created by: Irna Phillips
- Introduced by: Ted Corday (1956); Allen M. Potter (1965)
- Spin-off appearances: Our Private World
In-universe information
- Occupation: Physician; Chief of Staff at Memorial Hospital; Board member of Memorial Hospital
- Parents: Chris Hughes; Nancy Hughes
- Siblings: Susan Hughes; Don Hughes; Penny Hughes
- Spouse: Lisa Miller (1960–1964); Sandy Wilson (1968–1971); Jennifer Sullivan (1972–1975); Miranda Marlowe (1981–1984); Kim Sullivan (1985–)
- Sons: Tom Hughes; Christopher Hughes II
- Daughters: Frannie Hughes; Sabrina Hughes
- Grandsons: Casey Hughes; Daniel Hughes
- Granddaughters: Lien Hughes
- Grandparents: Will Hughes; Ma Hughes
- Uncles: John Hughes
- Aunts: Edith Hughes; Pearl
- Nephews: Ryder Hughes (adoptive)
- Nieces: Christina Hughes; Amy Lin Cunningham (adoptive)

Robert Hughes M.D. is a fictional character on the American soap opera As the World Turns. Bob was played by actor Don Hastings from October 1960 until the series' final episode on September 17, 2010. Actors Bobby Alford and Ronnie Welch played Bob previously between 1956 and 1960.

He was briefly married to Lisa Miller (with whom he had son Tom) during the 1960s; he and Lisa remain close friends. He was married to Kim Hughes, with whom he had a daughter, Sabrina, and a son, Chris.

Bob was also the last character seen on the show, leaving his office at the end of the final episode with the words "Good night," which mirrored the first words spoken on the show, "Good morning, dear," spoken by Helen Wagner as she portrayed Bob's mother, Nancy Hughes.

== Storylines ==
=== Early Storyline ===
Bob Hughes was the youngest child of Chris and Nancy Hughes and has always been a man of honor. Despite this, he has had a number of failed marriages and many women who did not measure up. Bob was in college and planning to go to medical school, when he met, Lisa Miller, a young college student from Rockford, Illinois. Lisa was determined to get Bob to marry her, as she reasoned a doctor would bring her prosperity. When Bob succumbs to Lisa's charms and they are secretly married, Bob's parents tried to have the marriage annulled on the basis of the couple being too young, Lisa's announcement of her pregnancy put an end to Chris and Nancy plans and the couple moved in with the Hugheses. Though Bob tried to be a good husband to Lisa and a good father to their son, Tommy, Lisa soon grew bored with her life and left Bob for a rich shoe salesman. The man found Lisa too unsophisticated, however, and dumped her. Lisa tried to get back together with Bob, but his pride was hurt and he refused to take her back.

=== Sylvia and Sandy ===
Not long after his divorce from Lisa, Bob fell for a sweet nurse named Sylvia Hill who was suffering from lupus. However, that relationship ended rather quickly since Sylvia decided to return home to her native Michigan. Bob continued to be busy building his medical career and became best friends with the older Dr. David Stewart. Meanwhile, at home, Tommy was lashing out at the Hugheses, thanks to Lisa's poisoning his mind against them. Blaming his father for the breakup of the marriage, Tommy destroyed "daddy" dolls and destroyed all gifts that Bob bought him. Finally, one day, Lisa suddenly left Oakdale with Tommy. Searching for him, the Hugheses discovered that he was placed in a military school in California and Bob and his father, Chris, retrieved the boy and brought him home. Now with his father, Tommy formed a close bond with his family again. Soon after, Bob received word that Lisa had gone to L.A. looking for Tommy, so he flew over to meet her only to find her nearly catatonic following a rape. Distressed at her condition, Bob brought her home. Also returning to Oakdale was Sylvia, whose lupus was in remission. Bob and Sylvia resumed their relationship and became engaged. Unfortunately by now, Lisa had recovered from her traumatic experience in L.A., and guilted Sylvia about splitting up the family. Not wanting to be a detriment to a potential reconciliation, Sylvia ended it with Bob and left town. However, though Lisa and Nancy, had hoped that he'd marry her again, he rebuffed her advances.

Bob's next wife was Sandy Wilson McGuire, a woman who was unjustly put in prison, and had a son from a previous marriage named Jimmy. Though both Tommy and Nancy opposed the union, with Nancy going as far as to tell Sandy that she would always consider Lisa her daughter in law, Bob married Sandy anyway. The marriage was a happy one, until tragedy struck: Sandy was caught in a fire and was horribly burned. Sandy's condition left her terribly depressed and Bob had no choice but to place her in an institution. While Sandy was away, Bob's sister, Penny, who could not have children of her own, persuaded Sandy's ex-husband, Roy McGuire, to get custody of Jimmy, even though Roy really believed the boy should stay with Bob. This put Bob at odds with his sister, especially when Penny talked Roy into marrying her to ensure that he would get custody. Fortunately, Sandy soon recovered and returned to Bob, with Jimmy being returned to them. Later, it was Bob's turn to be caught in a fire. The fire left him blind and the stress of taking care of him became too much for Sandy and she left. Feeling betrayed, Bob divorced her and his eyesight later returned. Sandy returned to Oakdale a few years later and though she and Bob tried to make another go of their relationship, by now Sandy was too involved in her new career (modeling) and the two parted ways again.

=== Jennifer Ryan ===
Afterwards, Bob fell for nurse Jennifer Ryan, the wife of Bob's old friend from medical school, Chuck Ryan. When Chuck learned he was dying, he asked Bob to take care of his family. Bob kept his word and ended up falling in love. Though Jennifer's daughter, Barbara, liked the Hughes family, Rick, who idolized his father, deeply resented Bob and vehemently opposed their relationship, going as far as to tell his mother that Lisa (who was now dating Bob's brother, Don) was pregnant with Bob's child. Jennifer saw right through the lie and married him. Unfortunately, Rick's poor performance at Memorial put a strain on their marriage because Jennifer continually accused Bob of being too hard on her son, who was an aspiring doctor. However, Bob refused to condone Rick's shoddy work, which included shamelessly stealing patients from Bob and David and making careless near-fatal diagnosis. With Rick a constant source of strife in the marriage, Bob and Jennifer's started coming apart. Finally, at a convention in Florida, Bob was pleasantly surprised to see Jennifer's sister, Kim Sullivan Reynolds. A singer, the widowed Kim was performing in Florida and she and Bob became reacquainted and had a fling. Afterwards, Kim, smitten with Bob, followed him back to Oakdale and observed for herself the deteriorating state of the marriage. Then came a shocking twist—both Jennifer and Kim ended up pregnant. Knowing there was a baby on the way changed everything and Kim decided to cover up the fact that she was pregnant with Bob's child - keeping the secret even from Bob himself. Although Kim had resolved to raise the child on her own, she quickly fell prey to Bob's rival, Dr. John Dixon, and fell for his arguments that she marry him to give the child a name. Later, one night, Bob and Jennifer fought and Bob ran out of his house and was hit by a car, in a delirious state, he blurted out to Jennifer that Kim was pregnant with his baby. Though shocked, Jennifer placed the brunt of the blame on herself and resolved to be a more understanding wife. Late that year, as Jennifer gave birth to their daughter, Frannie, while Kim was told that she had suffered a miscarriage. Kim stayed in her loveless marriage to John while Bob and Jennifer resolved to patch their marriage back together. Though things got easier when Rick left town, tragically, Jennifer would lose her life in a car accident, leaving Bob to raise Frannie alone.

=== Norm Garrison's death and Val Conway ===
Not long after, Sandy returned to town, running from her abusive husband, Norman Garrison. Soon, Norman followed demanding that she return to him. Accusing Bob of having an affair with Sandy, Norman suddenly suffered a heart attack and was admitted to Memorial where he later died after having another argument with someone. Soon an investigation, instigated by John Dixon, was conducted to see if Bob had caused Garrison's death. Bob was able to prove it was a woman who argued with Garrison the day he died, thus causing his death.

After an uneventful relationship with Kim's former sister-in-law, Valerie Reynolds Conway, Bob found himself intrigued with a woman named Karen Peters, who confessed to running off with a file that would clear her father (a judge) of the wrongdoing that he was accused of. Meanwhile, D.A. Walter Vested tried to persuade Bob to retrieve the papers and give them to him, but, sensing something was wrong, Bob refused. Shortly after, Karen's hotel room was ransacked and she fled town, but Vested lured her back by having his thugs go after Bob. Seeing Karen, Bob warned her not to trust Vested since he believed he was corrupt. Soon, Vested caught up with them and pulled a gun on the pair, but was killed in a struggle over the gun. Not long after, Bob was shocked to learn that Karen herself was also involved in the white collar crimes and she was placed in jail.

=== Relationships with Lyla and Kim ===
Years later, Bob became involved with Nurse Lyla Montgomery, and they fell in love and became engaged. However, trouble came during Dee Stewart's rape trial against John when Lyla was forced to admit that John was the father of her oldest daughter, Margo. Distressed that Lyla never told him about knowing John, in fact she led him to believe that she never knew him until now, Bob told Lyla that he did not know how he felt about her. Sadly, Lyla returned his ring. Next, Bob briefly married Miranda Marlowe, an international criminal. At one point, Miranda learned that her daughter, Bilan, was alive. Seventeen years earlier, Miranda, fearing for Bilan's safety, was forced to abandon the child after Bilan's father was murdered by Mr. Big's criminal organization. Sympathetic to her plight, Tom and Margo agreed to locate the girl and convince Bilan of her mother's love. Unbeknownst to them, Mr. Big was hoping to uncover a missing treasure that had belonged to Bilan's father; he was also looking for the teenager. Tom and Margo traveled from a convent in Paris to the island of Drasue where they found Bilan in a jungle village—but Mr. Big's men had followed them. Luckily, Bilan was able to escape and made her way to the US. Despite having some issues with her new stepmother, a nearly grown up Frannie became friends with Bilan. Unfortunately, when Frannie did this, she shunted aside, just a bit, another friend of hers, Marcy Thompson. Marcy started to believe that Frannie did not like her because of how poor she was and so when Frannie, who was volunteering as a candy striper at Memorial, introduced Marcy to her dad, Marcy decided to get Frannie back by kissing the older, rather shocked, Bob. At this same time, wealthy Kirk McColl, who was starting to date Marcy after Frannie spurned him, got mad at Marcy because she started developing a crush on Dr. Bob. During the end of 1983, while Bob was getting very frustrated about all of Miranda's lies, Marcy decided this was her time to pounce on Dr. Bob, literally. One day, Marcy went to Bob's office and literally threw herself on top of him unto his couch. At that moment, in walked Miranda, Bilan, Kirk and Frannie. Although it was innocent on Bob's part, that event helped bring about the end of Bob and Miranda's marriage. Although truth be told, Miranda found the Hughes family hopelessly provincial and, when her suave old flame arrived, he was easily able to persuade her to leave Bob. Marcy would continue to have that crush on Bob, until Lisa finally set her straight.

Soon after, Bob was finally able to marry the love of his life, and long-time friend, Kim. Soon after their marriage, Bob and Kim became involved in a mystery surrounding a young woman from England named Sabrina who looked an awful lot like Frannie. The Hugheses were not the only ones curious about Sabrina — someone else was asking about her as well, and when Bob spotted Memorial's former hospital administrator, he came to a stunning conclusion about who Sabrina really was. Tracking down Lansing for confirmation, Bob found him and demanded to know if Sabrina was the baby that Kim was told had died years earlier. In the end, it was discovered that Kim had never miscarried her baby — Lansing and Rick Ryan sold the baby to the wealthy Fullertons. The story out, Bob and Kim welcomed Sabrina into the family. Sabrina eventually moved to Oakdale and lived, for a time, with Bob and Kim before moving to Montega. Not long after, Kim gave birth to Bob's youngest son, Christopher. The biggest crisis to hit the Hughes marriage was when Bob had an affair with his old friend, Susan Stewart, Kim's old rival. Though Kim threw him out of the house, eventually she forgave him and their marriage remained on solid ground.

=== Serial killer Rick Decker ===
In his later years, Bob would face a professional crisis when three of his patients died under his care. Suffering from memory lapses during this time, Bob's handling of the cases was being looked into and he agreed to step down as head of Memorial. Though he initially balked at Chris's request that he seek out a specialist, he finally relented and made an appointment with the new geriatric specialist, Dr. Ric Decker. Though Chris feared that Bob may be suffering from Alzeheimer's, he actually had been suffering from a series of mini strokes that were treatable with medication. However, when more people started dying, it became apparent that there was a serial killer at Memorial. After bringing in a specialist, Walker Daniels, Bob was concerned when Daniels began suspecting Dr. Decker. Bob, however, stood by his doctor especially since there was no real evidence against him. However, Bob did find a key piece of evidence, the journal of a murdered nurse. Having realized who the killer was, Bob confronted him only to be injected with potassium chloride and lingering in a coma. Weeks later, he awoke to see Dr. Decker standing over him and called him a murderer before slipping back into a coma. Not long after, Bob awoke again for a brief moment, long enough to tell Chris, "Ric." Soon after, Bob made a full recovery and named Ric as his attacker.

=== Stroke and Senility ===
A few years later, after having left Oakdale to work in Pittsburgh and then Africa, Chris returned home with none other than Emily. Chris accepted Bob's offer to return to Memorial as head of research. Immediately, Chris was at loggerheads with his father over a research project conducted by Evan Walsh IV. While Chris felt the project was cutting-edge and would help people in the end, Bob felt it was way too risky. Though Bob had intended to groom Chris to eventually take over as Chief of Staff, Chris's arrogant ambitiousness unsettled Bob. While Emily encouraged Chris and even helped by printing a story condemning Bob for his closed minded reaction to the project, Dusty Donovan sided with Bob and warned that if the project was approved, he would pull the Jennifer Munson Foundation out of Memorial. That same day, Bob overheard Chris talking to Evan about his project; stating that Bob would not be a problem anymore. Finally, Bob had enough of his son's attitude and fired him from Memorial. That same day, Bob was left comatose following a stroke and, thanks to Kim's insistence that Bob wanted Chris to take over, Chris, who told no one of the huge argument he had with Bob, was sworn in as interim Chief of Staff. Defying his father's wishes, Chris approved Walsh's project. Soon, Dusty started accusing Chris of causing his father's stroke which Chris vehemently denied. Meanwhile, Bob lingered in a coma for six weeks. When Bob woke up, a humbled Chris apologized for his arrogant behavior.

=== Signs of senility ===
In July 2009, Bob and Kim attended a surprise party for Casey. During the middle of the party, Bob turned to Alison and said, "Nurse, would you send in the next patient?" When she questioned him about it he assured her he was fine and walked away. Alison later told Kim about it, and Bob quickly interrupted, saying that he was simply making a joke and that Alison does not understand his sense of humor, to which Kim replied that few people do. They left the party to go have drinks with Lisa. While the three were chatting at the bar, Lisa got up and left to go speak to someone. Kim said to Bob how terrific he was to which he replied saying, "You're pretty terrific yourself, Lisa." When Kim caught him on saying the wrong name, he quickly denied having said it, and Kim, having believed his mistake, blamed it on the champagne he had consumed.

=== 25th wedding anniversary ===
Kim and Bob celebrated 25 years of marriage on April 2, 2010. However, they discovered the man who initially performed their wedding ceremony was a clergyman and a fraud, thus making their marriage invalid. Kim chuckled and quoted, "25 years of sin," as Bob opted to get remarried. Kim, however, shocked everyone when she declared she needed space and decided not to hasten getting remarried.

Nevertheless, after consulting Bob's mother Nancy Hughes McClosky, Barbara Ryan, and Lisa Miller Grimaldi, several of Oakdale's most well-known citizens, Kim did indeed remarry Bob. A surprise came when their daughter Frannie Hughes (Julianne Moore) returned to Oakdale briefly.

=== Departure from Oakdale ===
In the fall of 2010, after the death of his beloved mother, Nancy, and a health scare for their son Chris, Bob and Kim decided to retire from their demanding jobs, so that they could spend time together. The pair left Oakdale together in ATWT's final episode, airing September 17, 2010.
