= Don Hastings =

American actor (born 1934)

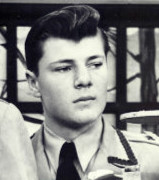
- Hastings as the Video Ranger on DuMont's Captain Video and His Video Rangers
- Born: April 1, 1934 (age 92); Brooklyn, New York, U.S.
- Occupations: Actor; singer; screenwriter
- Years active: 1940–2010
- Spouse: Nan Hastings (m. 1957, divorced) Leslie Denniston (m. 1980)
- Children: 4
- Relatives: Bob Hastings (brother)

Donald Francis Michael Hastings (born April 1, 1934) is an American television actor, singer, and writer. He is best known for his 50-year role as Dr. Robert "Bob" Hughes on the CBS soap opera As the World Turns (1960 to 2010). For his work on As the World Turns, Hastings received an Editor's Award at the Soap Opera Digest Awards in 1998 and a Daytime Emmy Lifetime Achievement Award in 2004. In the 1940s, he appeared on Broadway in I Remember Mama, On Whitman Avenue, A Young Man's Fancy, and Summer and Smoke. He also starred as the Video Ranger on DuMont's Captain Video and His Video Rangers (1949 to 1955) and as Jack Lane on the CBS soap opera The Edge of Night (1956 to 1960).

== Early life ==
Hastings was born on April 1, 1934, in Brooklyn, New York. He is the younger brother of actor Bob Hastings. His career began at six years old when he went to see his brother perform on a radio show. When the show's producers learned that Hastings was also a singer, he was asked to audition. He won his first role, singing on the radio show Coast to Coast on a Bus.

== Career ==
In 1941, Hastings joined a national tour of Life with Father. He traveled the U.S. with the company by train, from the age of seven until he was ten years old. He made his Broadway debut in I Remember Mama (1944). He then landed another Broadway role in On Whitman Avenue. He made his third appearance on Broadway as a replacement for the part of Grilly in A Young Man's Fancy at the Plymouth Theatre. Hastings played Young John in the original Broadway production of Tennessee Williams' Summer and Smoke. The play opened at the Music Box Theatre on October 6, 1948.

From 1949 to 1955, Hastings played Captain Video's teenaged companion, the Video Ranger, on the DuMont television series, Captain Video and His Video Rangers. He portrayed one of television's first superheroes designed to appeal to children.

In the 1940s and 1950s, he made appearances on television and radio shows, including The Chevrolet Tele-Theatre, The Magic Cottage, Studio One, Crunch and Des, A Date with Life, Modern Romances, The Road of Life, Hilltop House, Portia Faces Life, and Decoy.

In 1956, Hastings was cast as Jack Lane on the CBS soap opera, The Edge of Night. He spoke the first line in the premiere episode of the series. He stayed on the show for four and a half years. In 1960, Irna Phillips, the head writer of the CBS soap opera As the World Turns, saw his work on The Edge of Night. She thought he would be right for the role of Dr. Bob Hughes on ATWT and he was cast on the show. In the first week of October 1960, Hastings appeared in his last two episodes of The Edge of Night and also aired in his first two episodes of As the World Turns. The role of Bob had previously been played by a child actor, Bobby Alford, and one adult actor, Ronnie Welsh. In his early years on the show, he was paired romantically with Lisa Miller (Eileen Fulton), but he eventually found true love with Kim Sullivan (Kathryn Hays).

Hastings began writing sample scripts for the NBC soap opera Another World and submitting them to the show's head writer, Harding Lemay. He then started writing for As the World Turns, working with Irna Phillips. He also wrote for Guiding Light. As a writer, Hastings used the pen name J.J. Matthews, a combination of his children's names. He eventually decided to focus on acting because he found writing too stressful.

In 1965, Hastings was offered a role as one of Macdonald Carey's sons on the NBC soap opera Days of Our Lives, but he declined because he was happy working on As the World Turns. In 1977, he performed with his ATWT co-star, Kathryn Hays, in Hastings & Hays On Love, an evening where they would chat and sing about love. In June 1978, they appeared together in Algonquin Sampler, a literary review performed at New York's Joseph Jefferson Theater. In 1993, he received a Silver Circle Award from the Academy of Television Arts & Sciences for his many years in the television industry. Hastings and Kathryn Hays won the Editor's Award at the Soap Opera Digest Awards in 1998. He received a Daytime Emmy Lifetime Achievement Award in 2004.

The cancellation of As the World Turns was announced in December 2009. In the final episode, airing September 17, 2010, Dr. Bob Hughes retired from the hospital. Hastings spoke the final line of the series, "Good Night." The show had opened in 1956 with Nancy Hughes (Helen Wagner) saying, "Good morning, dear."

Hastings previously held the record as the longest continuous actor in the history of television serials until November 2010, shortly after As the World Turns ended. Guinness World Records stated that the non-continuous record was held by Hastings' co-star Helen Wagner, who played Nancy Hughes from April 2, 1956, until her death in May 2010.

== Personal life ==
Hastings married his first wife, Nan, in 1957. They had two daughters and a son. They later divorced.

He met actress Leslie Denniston when she briefly played Karen Peters on As the World Turns. They were married in 1980. They have a daughter, who was born in 1982.

His son Matthew has been active in show business since 1999 as a writer, director, and producer.

His older brother, actor Bob Hastings, died in 2014, at the age of 89.

== Awards and nominations ==
Year	Award	Category	Title	Result	Ref.
1992	Soap Opera Digest Award	Outstanding Lead Actor: Daytime	As the World Turns	Nominated	
1993	Silver Circle Award from the Academy of Television Arts & Sciences	Achievement Award		Won	
1998	Soap Opera Digest Award	Editor's Award (shared with Kathryn Hays)	As the World Turns	Won	
2004	Daytime Emmy Award	Lifetime Achievement Award		Won	
