= Lisa Grimaldi =

- As the World Turns character
- Eileen Fulton as Lisa Grimaldi
- Portrayed by: Eileen Fulton (1960–2010); Pamela King (1964); Betsy von Furstenberg (1983–84); Jane Powell (1990s); Maeve McGuire (1990s); Jennifer Bassey (1990s); Carmen Duncan (2004)
- Duration: 1960–2010
- First appearance: May 16, 1960
- Last appearance: September 17, 2010
- Created by: Irna Phillips
- Introduced by: Ted Corday
- Spin-off appearances: Our Private World
In-universe information
- Occupation: Former Partner in Java Underground; Owner of Mona Lisa Restaurant; Co-owner of the Lakeview Hotel; Former owner of Argus newspaper Formerly wrote a gossip column under the pseudonym "Dolly Valentine"; Former Co-Owner of Fashions Limited; Partner in Get Real Fashions; Former Manager of Wade Book Shop
- Father: Henry Miller
- Mother: Alma Miller
- Husband: Bob Hughes (1960–1964); John Eldridge (1965–1967); Michael Shea (1969–1970); Grant Coleman (1975–1979); Whit McColl (1982–1984); Earl Mitchell (1986–1987); Eduardo Grimaldi (1994–1995); Martin Chedwyn (1996)
- Sons: Tom Hughes; Scott Eldridge; Charles "Chuckie" Shea
- Stepchildren: Brian McColl; Diana McColl; Kirk McColl

Lisa Grimaldi is a fictional character from the CBS soap opera, As the World Turns. The character was portrayed by Eileen Fulton for 50 years from May 1960, until the last episode aired in September 2010, with Fulton becoming one of the longest-serving soap opera actors in the United States. Lisa is considered to be the first soap "vixen" and was one half of the first ever super couple, Bob and Lisa Hughes.

== Casting ==
As the World Turns creator and longtime head writer Irna Phillips created Lisa in the late 1950s as a short-term character. In a 2007 interview with the Archive of American Television, Fulton explained that ATWT's casting director contacted her agent, wanting to audition another of his clients, Lois Smith, for the role, but because Smith was unavailable, he recommended they audition Fulton instead. Lisa was kept on the As the World Turns canvas due to Fulton's day-to-day acting improvement. A Procter & Gamble executive said to Fulton six months into her run as Lisa, "I want to tell you what a wonderful job you are doing, because when you first came on the show we thought, 'We can't keep her. She's not very good.'"

Fulton's eagerness to play Lisa as a villainess contributed to the character's popularity and therefore its longevity. In the Archive of American Television interview, Fulton explained that the character was originally written to be a "nice girl", which she did not find compelling as an actress, and that, while she read Phillips' lines exactly as they appeared on the script, she said them with a "scheming tone" in her voice. When Phillips saw Fulton's performance she said "I can write for that little rascal. She can play a bitch!" In The Soap Opera Encyclopedia, Christopher Schermering writes, "Although Lisa was guilty of many lapses, nothing made her more hated by her audience of housewives than a simple sequence in which she hired a maid to clean house and went gallivanting about town. When mother-in-law Nancy complimented Lisa on what a nice home she had made for Bob, audiences were furious."

A scheming "vixen" in her early years, TIME magazine once referred to Lisa as a "superbitch" and the "most hated woman on TV." Since those days, Lisa has gone on to become a well-respected presence in Oakdale (the fictional town in which As the World Turns is set), often offering advice and support to the town's younger residents.

When the character of Lisa was introduced in 1960, the name "Lisa," which had only seen a popular resurgence in the previous ten years, was the sixth most popular baby name in the United States. Fulton's Lisa was credited with speeding up the popularity of the name for baby girls; "Lisa" became the most popular name for girls between the years of 1962 and 1969.

Lisa back in a 1960s episode

The character departed on May 3, 1965, and briefly crossed over into her own primetime spinoff series, Our Private World, for a few months in 1965, during which Lisa left Oakdale and moved to Chicago. She returned to Oakdale on January 16, 1967, where she remained until the final episode in 2010.

Recasts for Lisa were Pamela King filling in as Lisa during 1964 and Betsy von Furstenberg playing the role from late 1983 to early 1984 during a contract dispute between Ms. Fulton and Procter & Gamble. On multiple occasions from 1991 to 1994, former movie actress Jane Powell and soap opera veterans Maeve McGuire replaced Ms. Fulton during that same the time period as did soap opera veteran Jennifer Bassey. Australian actress Carmen Duncan, best known to American audiences for her role as Iris #3 on Another World, filled in for Fulton for three episodes in late 2004 while she was on emergency medical leave.

By the 1970s, Fulton's Lisa was always credited at the end of each program, after the names of the rest of the cast appeared in the credits. The character had become so integral to the story on As the World Turns that by 1987, actress Fulton was credited with playing the role of "Lisa" at the end of each day's show, and not with a surname (which was Mitchell at that time; Lisa had many marriages through the years). Fulton would be credited simply as playing "Lisa" with no character surname until the show ended its run in 2010. In its final years, Fulton along with a number of other veteran actors were rarely seen on canvas. In a 2009 interview, Fulton was confused as to why the writers found it so difficult to write for older characters. "It could be an age thing, but one of my favorite soaps is the British series EastEnders. They have no problem with featuring older actors. And giving them romantic and dramatic storylines."

== Character history ==
=== Bob and "Scheming Lisa" ===
The character first appeared in May 1960, as the fiancée of medical student Bob Hughes (Don Hastings). They soon eloped when they discovered that Lisa was pregnant. Though Bob's and Lisa's parents were at first opposed to their marriage (they believed the pair to be too young), they accepted it when they learned of Lisa's pregnancy. The young couple moved in with Bob's parents, Chris (Don MacLaughlin) and Nancy Hughes (Helen Wagner), while Bob finished his residency at Oakdale Memorial Hospital. Lisa initially demonstrated her scheming ways by faking "difficulties" with her pregnancy to get out of helping her new mother-in-law with the household chores. However, Nancy and Lisa eventually became very close, forming a bond that would remain intact for decades (even after Lisa and Bob divorced). Lisa's new sister-in-law, however, Penny Hughes (Rosemary Prinz) (who also was still living with Chris and Nancy) and Lisa took an immediate dislike to one another. Penny, who had lost a baby, and recently learned she could no longer have children, resented Lisa's pregnancy. Lisa disliked Penny and her best friend Ellen Lowell (Patricia Bruder), who she felt thought they were better than herself, while Ellen and Penny found Lisa to be an idle gossip. The animosity between Penny and Lisa led to considerable tension in the Hughes home, with Lisa exploiting Penny's emotional estrangement from Chris and Nancy, attempting to further alienate Penny from her parents. (Though Lisa and Penny would eventually become a bit more friendly as they both matured, Lisa maintained an adversarial relationship with Ellen right up until Ellen left Oakdale in the late 1990s.)

A year into Bob and Lisa's marriage, after their son Tom was born, Lisa became tired of living as the wife of a young resident, resenting Bob's long hours in the hospital. She had an affair with flashy businessman Bruce Elliott, asking him to take her with him when she left town, but he told her the affair was just a diversion for him, and that he cared nothing for her. Meanwhile, Bob, whom she had already alienated, had found out about the relationship and divorced Lisa. Lisa responded by poisoning Tom's mind against his father, eventually fleeing to California with Tom, without Bob's knowledge. When Bob finally tracked them down, he found Lisa in a near-catatonic state, following a brutal rape. He brought her back to Oakdale, enlisting the help of Sylvia Hill, a nurse with whom Bob had been involved. Once Lisa recovered from the trauma, she attempted to guilt Sylvia into ending her relationship with Bob, falsely suggesting that she was the only thing preventing Bob and Lisa to reconcile. Nancy also cautioned Sylvia that Lisa was the only person she would ever accept as her daughter-in-law. Though Sylvia eventually decided to end her relationship with Bob, Bob informed Lisa that he was not interested in a reconciliation with her.

=== Our Private World ===
Rejected, Lisa moved to Chicago in mid-1965 (with the character relocating to the primetime soap Our Private World), where she became involved with the Eldridge brothers. She married wealthy John Eldridge, but soon began a torrid affair with his brother Tom. When the affair was revealed, Lisa fled Chicago in disgrace. It was revealed in the early 1990s that Lisa was in fact pregnant when she left, and that the Eldridge family had paid Lisa a hefty divorce settlement, in exchange for her having nothing to do with her baby. The baby, Scott Eldridge, was presumably born during the several-month-long lapse between when Our Private World went off the air in the fall of 1965 and when Lisa returned to As the World Turns in the spring of 1966. Viewers were not made aware of Scott's existence until he tracked Lisa down as an adult in 1992.

=== Return to Oakdale ===
Several months after leaving Chicago, Lisa resurfaced in Oakdale, and began having an affair with Dr. Michael Shea, a charming, manipulative sociopath. Though she asked Michael to leave his wife so they could be married, especially after Lisa discovered she was pregnant, Michael refused. After Lisa's baby, Charles "Chuckie" Shea was born, Lisa told Michael's wife about the affair and her son. Clare was drinking, something she did a lot of in those days. Claire told Michael she wanted him to marry Lisa and make his son legitimate. Claire then let it slip that there had been another illegitimate child in the family. Michael put things together and figured out that Ellen was the mother of that child and that her son was Dr. Dan Stewart, a bright young doctor that Shea resented. He made it his business to tell Dan the truth. When Claire learned this, she stabbed him with a letter opener. Michael, who had been let go from Memorial Hospital after the loss of a patient, agreed to keep quiet about what Claire had done if he could be reinstated. Claire divorced Michael.

A short while later, Michael decided that he wanted to play a role in his son's life, and tried to get Lisa to marry him, but by this time, she wanted nothing to do with him. Around the same time, Lisa's son Tom had returned from Vietnam with a drug habit. One night, Michael caught Tom breaking into his office to steal drugs, and Michael used this information to blackmail Lisa into marrying him. By this time, Lisa hated Michael with a passion, and though she did marry him (to save Tom), she refused to have any kind of a sexual relationship with him. Michael responded by orchestrating a series of events designed to make Lisa appear as an unfit mother, so he could divorce her and sue for custody of Chuckie. However, in early 1970, Michael was murdered, and Lisa was nowhere to be found. Tom was the prime suspect, and, thinking his mother had committed the murder, he said little to demonstrate his innocence. When Lisa returned to town, she could not remember the events leading to Michael's murder, but eventually the murder was revealed to have been committed by the mother of a young woman with whom Michael had had an affair.

Lisa had a few more flings, including one with Bob's older brother, Don Hughes, attorney Dick Martin, minister Wally Matthews, and the rich Simon Gilby. Around this time, she believed herself to be pregnant, though her doctor revealed Lisa suffered from an ovarian cyst.

=== Lisa, Grant and Joyce ===
In 1973, Tom and his young brother Chuckie were struck by another driver. Though Tom survived, Chuckie was killed in the accident. The grief was almost too much for Lisa to bear but she received a great deal of support and love from her former mother-in-law Nancy Hughes, as well as from a new man in her life, Grant Colman (James Douglas), an attorney who had recently joined Chris Hughes' law firm. Grant and Lisa fell in love and planned to be married, but on the day of the ceremony, Grant's ex-wife crashed their wedding to announce that during their marriage, she and Grant had had a son of whom Grant was unaware. Grant postponed the wedding to investigate, and determined that he and Joyce had indeed had a son who had since been adopted. He decided not to interfere in the boy's life, and let him remain with his adoptive parents. Grant and Lisa were finally married, but Joyce continued to scheme and interfere in their lives, and for a while they also had to contend with the equally scheming Valerie Conway was also attempting to seduce both Bob and Grant at the same time. Lisa eventually pointed Valerie in Bob's direction, so she would stay away from Grant.

Though Grant and Lisa were very happy together, Lisa's ongoing jealousy of Joyce and later Valerie continue to be a problem, and at one point, Grant asked Lisa for a divorce. Lisa pretended to be ill, and staged an elaborate scheme designed to demonstrate Valerie's true calculating ways. Though she succeeded in this, Grant and Lisa's lives continued to be complicated, this time by a new woman, Tina Cornell, who had a played a role in the previous manipulations involving Valerie, and was injured as a result. Lisa invited Tina to recuperate with her and Grant. Tina told Lisa that she had developed agoraphobia, but she in fact was becoming obsessed with Grant. When Lisa discovered this, she ordered Tina to leave, but Grant saw this as just another case of Lisa's jealousy. He and Lisa separated, but when Tina attempted to seduce him, he realized that Lisa had been right all along.

Though he claimed to be through with scheming women, Joyce now reentered Grant's life, pretending to be terminally ill. Though Lisa disputed Joyce's claims of illness, Grant believed her and the two became engaged. He learned that Lisa was correct, but Lisa was hurt by Grant's refusal to believe her, and refused to give her relationship with Grant another try. Grant left town in late 1981, though he and Lisa would get over their bitterness and would become friends again.

=== Whit and Earl ===
In 1982, Lisa eloped with wealthy businessman Whit McColl. Their lives were soon complicated by the arrival of Lucinda Walsh, who claimed Whit was responsible for the suicide of her husband, Whit's former business partner. Lisa became very close to Whit's two sons, Brian and Kirk McColl, and when Whit was murdered in 1984, Lisa continued to serve as a mother figure to her stepsons.

Though deeply saddened by Whit's death, Lisa embarked on two new business ventures during this period that would help her through the sorrow. In 1985, Lisa joined her friends, Kim Sullivan Hughes and Barbara Ryan, to launch Fashions, a high-end boutique showcasing top designs. Kim and Barbara eventually both sold their shares in the business to Lisa; she remains the sole owner through the show's conclusion in 2010. In 1986, Lisa and Craig Montgomery purchased a restaurant formerly known as Caroline's, and reopened it as The Mona Lisa. Lisa became the sole owner when Craig left Oakdale in the late 1980s, and presumably still operates the restaurant today although it was neither seen nor referred to on camera after 2005. In addition to these two businesses, Lisa also co-owns the Lakeview Hotel with Lily Snyder.

In 1986, though Brian McColl's girlfriend Shannon O'Hara (who herself had become very close to Lisa), she met Shannon's uncle, the mysterious, charming Earl Mitchell. The two began dating, and though Earl had a mysterious side, disappearing without explanation for days on end, Lisa agreed to marry him. A few months into their marriage, Earl disappeared, and Lisa soon received a message that Earl had been kidnapped. Her ex-husband Grant returned to Oakdale to show his support. Lisa received a call from someone who claimed to know of Earl's whereabouts, but when she drove to meet him, her brakes failed. She was not injured, but started to see images of Earl and hear his voice, causing her family to worry and question her sanity. The truth about Earl was finally revealed: he was an Interpol agent who'd been killed while attempting to investigate James Stenbeck.

=== Later years ===
In 1992, Lisa stood up to her friends, Jessica Griffin (a Black woman) and Duncan McKechnie (a white man), when she voiced her objections to their plans to wed. At first Duncan and Jessica believed Lisa's objections stemmed from residual feelings for Duncan's previous wife, Shannon O'Hara, with whom Lisa bonded, serving as a mother-figure of sorts for Shannon. Lisa later told the couple her reasoning was that she was afraid of the racism they would face, even going as far as to assert that interracial marriages were "morally wrong". Through compassion and education on the parts of Duncan and Jessica toward Lisa, Lisa realized the negative impact of her public stance. She apologized to the couple, and they forgave her. Lisa warmed to Jessica and Duncan's union and was even asked to become godmother to their child, Bonnie, which she accepted.

In late 1994, Lisa married Eduardo Grimaldi, a Maltese gangster. Lisa's happiness lasted only a few weeks, because Eduardo was shot by an associate, and was rushed to Oakdale Memorial. His cousin Orlena Grimaldi sneaked into his room and killed him, resulting in Lisa believing Eduardo's death was due to medical incompetence on the part of John Dixon, who was on duty in the ER when he was brought in. Lisa sued John for malpractice, threatening to end his career, before the truth of Eduardo's death came out. John took revenge on Lisa by wooing her and proposing to her, only to publicly dump her at their engagement party. She and John remained estranged for some time, until he and their mutual friend Barbara Ryan rescued Lisa from Martin Chedwyn, a criminal who had forced Lisa to marry him as part of a scheme to smuggle assets out of Hong-Kong before the changeover in government in 1999. Lisa forgave John for the public spectacle at their engagement party, and the two remained on good terms thereafter.

In the early 2000s (decade), Lisa befriended Oakdale newcomer Isaac Jenkins, introducing Isaac to her goddaughter Bonnie McKechnie (whom he would later marry), and partnering with Isaac and Bonnie in their new club Java. She would remain involved with Java until Isaac and Bonnie left town, at that time, selling her shares in the club. She was featured in a tribute episode in May 2000, honoring Fulton's and costar Don Hastings' 40th anniversaries on the show, in which a mean spirited tabloid story causes Lisa and Bob to reminisce about key events in their lives (via flashbacks).

In more recent years, Lisa has retreated from the spotlight, interfering in the lives of her son and daughter-in-law, and mentoring Oakdale's younger residents.

In June and July 2008, Lisa became involved in the dramas between Barbara, Paul, Meg, and Sofie. This ended when Paul Ryan found Sofie dead in her hotel room. It was revealed that Cole had killed Sofie.

Lisa played a key role in organizing Tom and Margo's twenty-fifth anniversary party.

Eileen Fulton as Lisa Grimaldi in a screencap from the April 22, 2009 episode.

Lisa reappeared in April 2009 to be involved in the mystery of Luke and Noah's kidnapping.

== Final years and ATWT cancellation ==
During the final years of ATWT, Lisa's portrayer Eileen Fulton criticized producers over the lack of airtime for her character, as well as other longtime characters, whose screentime had dramatically diminished in favor of younger cast members. In 2008, she appeared three - four times per month, but played a large role in the April 2010 episode depicting Bob and Kim's second wedding.

A special two-part tribute episode aired on May 17–18, 2010, commemorating Fulton's fiftieth anniversary on the show, and she was also prominently featured in the August 2010 episode memorializing longtime castmate Helen Wagner.

She appeared in the final episode in September 2010. In her last scenes, Lisa made peace with former fiance John Dixon and rival Lucinda Walsh.

== Reception ==
In 2024, Charlie Mason from Soaps She Knows placed Lisa 16th eighth on his ranked list of Soaps' 40 Most Iconic Characters of All Time, writing, "Eileen Fulton's wicked witch of Oakdale may have been the ultimate love-to-hate character; early on in her 50-year run, she was even chosen to headline a primetime offshoot."

== See also ==
- List of soap opera villains
