= Wendy Drew =

American actress (1929-2017)

Wendy Drew (née Barbara Levitt; May 8, 1929 - August 2, 2017) was an American actress.

== Early years ==
Drew was born on May 8, 1929, in Brooklyn, the daughter of Philip and Shirley Levitt. Ballerina Allegra Kent is her sister.

After her parents divorced when she was a child she and her two siblings stayed with her mother. The family moved frequently, living in Texas and California, among other places. Each move was accompanied by an intelligence test in her new school system. Her consistently high scores resulted in her skipping grades until she graduated from high school in Los Angeles when she was 14 years old.

For the first 12 years of her life, Drew had no interest in acting. In the summer of 1941, when the family lived in Miami Beach, she decided to attend a drama school in which some of her friends had enrolled. When actor Morgan Farley heard her read a part during his visit to the school, "her face and her voice stayed with him". A year later he contacted her, and she portrayed a girl in her late teens in his production of The Eve of St. Mark. Only after she had been in the play did he discover that she was 13 years old, rather than his estimation of 16.

== Career ==
Drew began studying dramatics at the Pasadena Playhouse when she was 15, but she was so much younger than the other students there that she felt isolated. Her mother allowed her to go to New York, where she lived with a relative. Farley provided a reference that she took to an agent, and she began to seek work. The agent sent her to an audition for a touring production of A Joy Forever, with the company headed by Otto Kruger. At the theater, she became discouraged because more than 20 actress tried out for the role, and all of them "looked so experienced and glamorous". She had almost given up when someone encouraged her to at least read for the part. She was the last one to try, and she was given the part. That play ended after 2 1/2 months on the road and two weeks on Broadway. Then she began taking night jobs so that her days would be free for seeking acting work. After short stints as a box-office cashier and a cigarette girl in a restaurant, she worked for three years in a bookstore.

=== Stage ===
Drew was a member of the cast of a touring company that put on Dear Ruth in a series of one-night stands in the midwestern United States for a month. After each performance the group got a few hours' sleep in a hotel, then loaded a station wagon and traveled to the next town, where the pattern was repeated. In the winter of 1948-1949 she was part of a stock troupe that put on plays in Berwyn, Pennsylvania. In June 1949 Drew's debut with the Lakewood Players came in Let Us Be Gay. The following week she had a major role in that company's production of Slightly Married.

=== Radio ===
In 1954, Drew was slected for the lead role in Young Widder Brown. The program's producers remembered her from her unsuccessful audition for another program eight years earlier, contacted her, and signed her for the part. Other radio programs in which she appeared included Our Gal Sunday, Electric Theatre, Let's Pretend, Teen Talk, and True Story.

=== Television ===
Drew portrayed Betty, the title character's sister, in Jimmy Hughes, Rookie Cop, a 1953 Dumont Network series. She played Ellen Lowell on As the World Turns for the program's first four years. Her performances in the latter role sometimes resulted in antagonistic encounters with viewers. Other TV programs on which Drew appeared included Lux Video Theatre, Blind Date, Front Row Center, Kraft Television Theatre, The Philco Television Playhouse, and Studio One.

== Later years ==
Drew was co-proprietor of The Family Album, an antique store in Westport, Connecticut. Drew, who began collecting antiques with money from her first pay as an actress, and her business partner opened the store in June 1977.

== Personal life ==
Drew was married to, and divorced from, photographer Ken Heyman. They had a daughter.
