= Our Private World =

American television series

- Genre: Soap opera
- Created by: Irna Phillips; William J. Bell
- Directed by: Tom Donovan
- Starring: Eileen Fulton; Nicolas Coster; Geraldine Fitzgerald; Sam Groom; David O'Brien; Julienne Marie
- Music by: Wladimir Selinsky
- Country of origin: United States
- Original language: English
- No. of episodes: 38

Production
- Producer: Allen M. Potter
- Running time: 30 minutes

Original release
- Network: CBS
- Release: May 5 – September 10, 1965

Our Private World is a 1965 American serial. It was the first primetime spin-off from a daytime soap (As the World Turns, the number-one daytime soap opera at the time). Created by Irna Phillips and William J. Bell, it premiered on May 5, 1965, and aired Wednesdays and Fridays over the summer; the multiple-episode-per-week format was inspired by ABC's hit show Peyton Place. The final episode aired on September 10 of the same year. Our Private World starred Eileen Fulton as Lisa Miller Hughes, the same heroine she had played on As the World Turns, and Nicolas Coster. A total of 38 half-hour episodes were produced. Also in the cast were film star Geraldine Fitzgerald and stage actress Julienne Marie.

The storyline started on As the World Turns, with Lisa boarding a train to Chicago and the announcer (Dan McCullough) encouraging the audience to watch the spin-off. Upon arriving, Lisa took a job in the admitting room of the local hospital and met her wealthy future husband John Eldredge (Coster, who decades later also played Lisa's seventh husband, Eduardo Grimaldi). A few months after the demise of the series, Fulton returned to As the World Turns.

Nearly three decades later, As the World Turns writers resurrected remnants of Lisa's Our Private World storyline, when a previously unmentioned son whom Lisa had while in Chicago (presumably during the period between the end of Our Private World and Fulton's return to As the World Turns in early 1966) resurfaced and made contact with her.

For its run from May until September 1965, the series was aired on CBS on Wednesdays at 9:30 pm and Fridays at 9:00 pm.
