= Eileen Fulton =

American actress, singer and author (1933–2025)

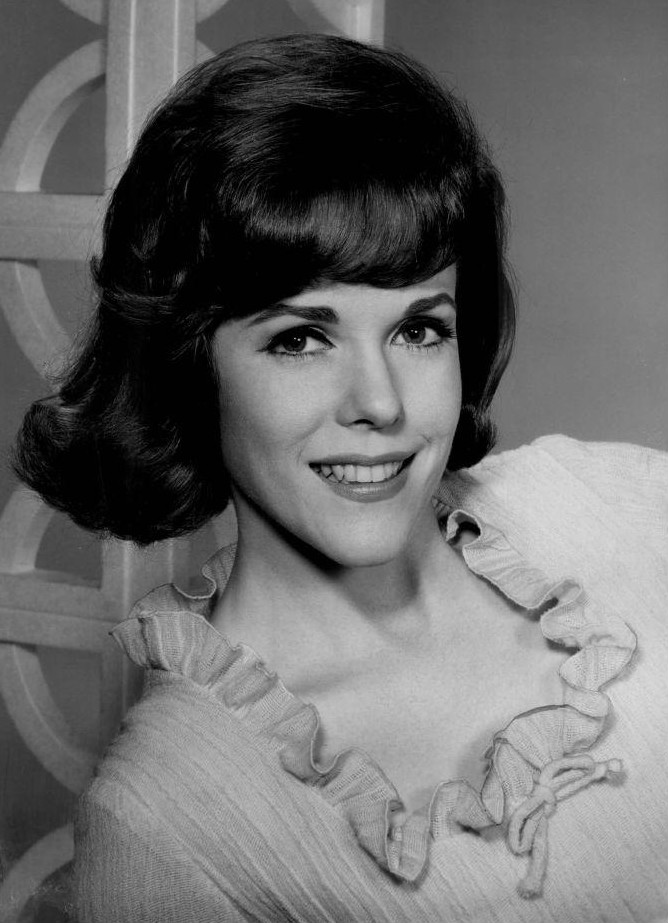
- Fulton in 1965
- Born: Margaret Elizabeth McLarty; September 13, 1933; Asheville, North Carolina, U.S.
- Died: July 14, 2025 (aged 91); Asheville, North Carolina, U.S.
- Education: Greensboro College
- Occupations: Actress; singer; author
- Years active: 1960–2019
- Spouse(s): Bill Cochrane (m. 1957, divorced) Danny Fortunato (m. 1970; div. 1980) Rick McMorrow (m. 1989, divorced)

Margaret Elizabeth McLarty (September 13, 1933 – July 14, 2025), known professionally as Eileen Fulton, was an American actress, singer and author. She portrayed Lisa Grimaldi on the CBS soap opera As the World Turns, which she played almost continuously for 50 years, from May 18, 1960, until the show's ending on September 17, 2010. She also starred on Our Private World (1965), a primetime spin-off of As the World Turns. For her work on ATWT, she received an Editor's Award at the Soap Opera Digest Awards in 1991 and a Daytime Emmy Lifetime Achievement Award in 2004. Fulton appeared in theatrical productions including the original Broadway run of Who's Afraid of Virginia Woolf? She performed a cabaret act at theaters in New York and Los Angeles. She co-authored two autobiographies, How My World Turns and As My World Still Turns. She also wrote a novel titled Soap Opera, and six murder-mystery novels.

== Early life ==
Fulton was born Margaret Elizabeth McLarty in Asheville, North Carolina, on September 13, 1933. Her father was a Methodist minister, and she was descended from a long line of clergymen. When she was two years old, Fulton interrupted church services by performing the song "Shortnin' Bread".

Her father's work as a minister caused the family to move frequently. They lived in Mount Holly, Winston-Salem, Boone, Belmont, and Marion. When she was in the third grade, Fulton told her parents, "When I grow up and become a movie star, I'm going to get you a house of your own."

She attended Greensboro College, studying music and dramatics. During her college years, she performed in Candide. Fulton also played an elf in a production of James Thurber's The 13 Clocks. She majored in music. After graduation, her father found her a job working with a local church choir, but she wanted to move to New York.

== Career ==
=== 1956–1960: As the World Turns ===
Fulton made her professional acting debut in the play The Lost Colony in Manteo, North Carolina. She moved to New York in 1956 and attended the Neighborhood Playhouse School of the Theatre. She studied with Sanford Meisner and Lee Strasberg. She supported herself with a variety of jobs, including selling hats at Macy's and modeling. She posed for photos that were used on the cover of True Confessions magazine. She started using the stage name of Eileen Fulton. She was cast as Lisa Mae Bailey in the drama film Girl of the Night (1960), co-starring with Anne Francis.

She was cast as Lisa Grimaldi (then known as Lisa Miller) on the CBS soap opera As the World Turns, first airing May 18, 1960. Fulton originated the role. In her early years on the show, the character of Lisa was married to Dr. Bob Hughes (Don Hastings). That romance eventually failed, but she went on to have seven more marriages.

In the 1960s, Fulton became the first soap actress to hire a publicist. The character of Lisa became hated after a sequence in which she hired a maid to clean the house and went gallivanting about town. When mother-in-law Nancy complimented Lisa on what a nice home she made for her son Bob, the audience became furious, stopping Fulton on the street and slapping her.

She once refused to film a scene where the character of Lisa was being spanked, because she believed it glorified spousal abuse. Another time, when the show's producer and head writer, Irna Phillips, refused to tell her if Lisa was the culprit during a murder mystery, Fulton told her, "We're live–don’t forget. And if you don’t tell me, I'll make up your mind for you on the air."

=== 1960–1966: Our Private World ===
In the 1960s, she also took theater roles. She appeared in Abe Lincoln in Illinois with Hal Holbrook. Fulton replaced Melinda Dillon as Honey in the original Broadway production of Who's Afraid of Virginia Woolf? She also starred Off-Broadway in The Fantasticks. Fulton would perform in the live broadcast of As the World Turns, then be on stage for the matinee performance of Who’s Afraid of Virginia Woolf? There was only a 30-minute window between the time ATWT concluded its live broadcast at 2:00 pm, and the beginning of the first act of Virginia Woolf. She had time to travel from CBS' studios to the Billy Rose Theatre and get into costume because her character did not appear on stage for the first 20 minutes. Fulton would be back onstage by evening, performing in The Fantasticks.

Her other theater credits include Many Loves, Any Wednesday, Sabrina Fair, Summer of the Seventeenth Doll, Nite Club Confidential, Plaza Suite, It Had To be You, The Owl and the Pussycat, Goodbye Charlie, and Cat on a Hot Tin Roof.

Fulton left As the World Turns for several months in 1964. During her absence, the role of Lisa was recast with actress Pamela King. In 1965, Irna Phillips, the head writer of ATWT, created a primetime spin-off series, Our Private World, focused on the character of Lisa. The spin-off lasted from May 5 to September 10, 1965, before being cancelled. Fulton took several months off before returning to As the World Turns in May 1966. CBS hired a bodyguard to escort her to and from the studio due to overzealous fans.

=== 1966–1986: The Granny clause ===
In the late 1960s, after her onscreen son was aged from age 12 to 19, Fulton insisted it be written into her contract that her character could not become a grandmother. She feared that the perception of her as a grandmother, instead of a glamorous and vital woman, would cause the writers to kill off her character. (This had been done when Barbara Berjer, who was playing one of Lisa's rivals, Claire Shea, became a grandmother).

In 1970, Fulton co-authored her first autobiography, How My World Turns. She also released her debut album, The Same Old World, on the Pan label. She was briefly absent from ATWT in the late 1970s and the role of Lisa was recast with actress Lynn Rogers.

She left ATWT again in April 1983 and the role was recast with Betsy von Furstenberg. Fulton returned 18 months later, first airing on August 3, 1984. She agreed to return when she was promised to have six months on the show, followed by six months off, a more glamorous storyline, and time off for singing and acting appearances. Fans, believing that the "granny clause" as it had become known, was still in effect (which it was not), sent Fulton so much threatening "hate mail" when Lisa's onscreen daughter-in-law, Margo, had a miscarriage in 1986, that she again had to have a bodyguard.

=== 1988–1998: Books ===
In the late 1980s, she wrote a series of six murder-mystery novels: Take One for Murder, Death of a Golden Girl, Dying for Stardom, Lights, Camera, Death, A Setting for Murder, and Fatal Flashback.

Fulton was nominated for a Daytime Emmy Award for Outstanding Supporting Actress in a Drama Series in 1988. In June 1990, she took a leave of absence from ATWT while she underwent gynecological surgery. The role of Lisa was temporarily recast with Jane Powell. In 1991, Fulton received the Editor's Award at the Soap Opera Digest Awards. She took another short break from ATWT in 1992 and was replaced with Maeve McGuire. Jane Powell filled in for Fulton again briefly in 1993 and 1994.

In 1995, she co-authored her second autobiography, As My World Still Turns, to celebrate her 35th anniversary on ATWT. Fulton was nominated for a Soap Opera Digest Award for Outstanding Lead Actress in 1996. She was inducted into the Soap Opera Hall of Fame in 1998.

=== 1999–2019 ===
Fulton wrote a fiction novel titled Soap Opera, loosely based on her experiences on As the World Turns. In the early 2000s, she routinely performed a cabaret act at the West Bank Cafe in Manhattan. She also brought the act to the Cinegrill in Los Angeles. The spotlight song of Fulton's cabaret performances was "As If We Never Said Goodbye" from Sunset Boulevard. She would perform the song in front a slideshow tribute to her years on As the World Turns. She headlined CabaretFest 2003 in Provincetown, Massachusetts.

On June 1, 2000, ATWT aired a special clip montage to honor Fulton and her co-star Don Hastings' 40th anniversaries on the show. In 2004, they both received Daytime Emmy Lifetime Achievement Awards. She was absent from ATWT for a few days in 2004 and the role of Lisa was temporarily recast with Carmen Duncan. Fulton played Betty in the drama film The Signs of the Cross (2005), co-starring with Dan Lauria. She played Joyce Singleton in the drama film Tinsel Town (2005), written and directed by Kenneth del Vecchio. She also appeared as Mrs. Carreck in The Drum Beats Twice (2008), another film written and directed by del Vecchio.

The cancellation of As the World Turns was announced in December 2009. In May 2010, ATWT aired a tribute episode, celebrating Fulton's 50th year on the show. In the episode, the show's younger cast members re-enacted classic scenes of Lisa and Nancy (Helen Wagner). Fulton remained on the show through its cancellation, but she only appeared briefly in the final episode, airing September 17, 2010.

In 2010, Fulton performed her cabaret act at Don't Tell Mama in New York. In April 2011, she brought her act, titled "Blame It on My Youth," to the New Hope Cabaret in Pennsylvania. In July 2011, she played Mrs. Higgins in a Connecticut Repertory Theatre production of My Fair Lady, co-starring with Terrence Mann.

== Personal life and death ==
In honor of her father, Fulton established a music scholarship at Brevard College in North Carolina. She also established a fine arts scholarship in her mother and her names at their alma mater, Greensboro College. She was awarded an honorary doctorate at Greensboro College when she spoke at their commencement.

Fulton was an investor in the New York Stars women's basketball team.

She married her first husband, Bill Cochrane, in 1957, and they later divorced.

She married her second husband, record producer Danny Fortunato, in 1970. They divorced in 1980. Fulton said that she wore disguises when going to work after their breakup, because she was afraid of him.

Fulton met landscape architect Rick McMorrow at a political benefit. They were married in 1989 and divorced three months later. She said that the marriage was over the day after their wedding.

Fulton died on July 14, 2025 in Asheville, North Carolina from heart failure at the age of 91.

== Filmography ==
=== Film ===
Year	Title	Role	Notes
1960	Girl of the Night	Lisa Mae Bailey	
2005	The Signs of the Cross	Betty	
2005	Tinsel Town	Joyce Singleton	
2005	Rose Woes and Joe's	Multiple Woman Customers	
2008	The Drum Beats Twice	Mrs. Carreck	
2011	The Life Zone	Katherine Wise	

=== Television ===
Year	Title	Role	Notes
1959	Nero Wolfe	Receptionist	Episode: "Count the Man Down"
1960–1964, 1966–1983, 1984–2010	As the World Turns	Lisa Grimaldi	Contract role
1962	Naked City	Janie Daggett	Episode: "The Face of the Enemy"
1962	Armstrong Circle Theatre		Episode: "The Secret Crime"
1965	Our Private World	Lisa Grimaldi	Series regular, 33 episodes

== Awards and nominations ==
Year	Award	Category	Title	Result	Ref.
1988	Daytime Emmy Award	Outstanding Supporting Actress in a Drama Series	As the World Turns	Nominated	
1991	Soap Opera Digest Award	Editor's Award		Won	
1996	Soap Opera Digest Award	Outstanding Lead Actress	As the World Turns	Nominated	
2004	Daytime Emmy Award	Lifetime Achievement Award		Won	

== Bibliography ==
Author	Title	Year	Publisher	ISBN	Notes
Fulton, Eileen; Bolton, Brett	How My World Turns	1970	Taplinger Publishing Company	0800839706	
Fulton, Eileen	Take One for Murder	1988	Ballantine Books	0804101949	
Fulton, Eileen	Death of a Golden Girl	1988	Ivy Books	0804101965	
Fulton, Eileen	Dying for Stardom	1988	Ivy Books	0804102007	
Fulton, Eileen	Lights, Camera, Death	1988	Ivy Books	0804102031	
Fulton, Eileen	A Setting for Murder	1988	Ivy Books	0804102082	
Fulton, Eileen	Fatal Flashback	1988	Ivy Books	0804102104	
Fulton, Eileen; Atholl, Desmond; Cherkinian, Michael	As My World Still Turns: The Uncensored Memoirs of America's Soap Opera Queen	1995	Birch Lane Press	1559722746	
Fulton, Eileen	Soap Opera	1999	St. Martins Press	0312203659	
