= Nancy Hughes =

Fictional American TV character

- As the World Turns character
- Portrayed by: Helen Wagner; Betty Lowe (1988)
- Duration: 1956–2010
- First appearance: April 2, 1956
- Last appearance: June 1, 2010
- Created by: Irna Phillips
In-universe information
- Occupation: Teacher; Volunteer; Author
- Siblings: Pearl
- Husband: Chris Hughes (1936–1986); Dan McCloskey (1988–1996)
- Sons: Don Hughes; Bob Hughes
- Daughters: Penny Hughes; Susan Hughes
- Grandsons: Tom Hughes; Ryder Hughes; Chris Hughes II
- Granddaughters: Frannie Hughes; Sabrina Hughes; Christina Hughes; Amy Lyn Cunningham

Nancy Hughes McClosky is a fictional character from the CBS Daytime soap opera As the World Turns. Portrayed by Helen Wagner for 54 years from the soap's inception in 1956 until 2010, Nancy served as the core family's and, by extension, the town's matriarch.

Wagner was acknowledged by the Guinness Book of Records as being the portrayer of the longest-running character portrayed by one actor on television, and held the title until her death on May 1, 2010. Wagner spoke the first lines, "Good morning, dear," on the series debut on April 2, 1956.

Throughout the course of the series, Nancy remained a matriarch figure in the lives of those she cared for. Over the course of the program, Nancy had appeared in some 19,700 scenes and has been described as a straitlaced, proper and unassuming woman who stood for "old-fashioned values".

In 2004, Wagner received her first award for her work on the show in the form of a Lifetime Achievement Award at the Daytime Emmys after 48 years on the soap. Wagner died of cancer on May 1, 2010, and Nancy last appeared June 1, 2010. As the World Turns dedicated two episodes to both the character and actress with surrounding characters illustrating different ways of dealing with her death.

== Creation and casting ==
=== Characterization ===
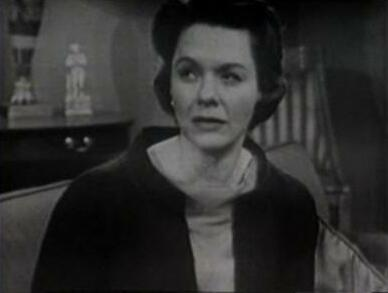
Nancy as she appeared in 1956

Wagner began portraying Nancy in the first episode in 1956. Six months on, producer Irna Phillips sacked Wagner due to her dissatisfaction with the way that she poured coffee – an important task for a character who provided a sympathetic ear and a shoulder on which to cry. The character was later reinstated.

In a 1968 New York Times interview, Wagner called Nancy Hughes "a tentpole character." "Nothing ever happens to Nancy," Wagner said. "She's the one the others come and talk to."

However again in the 1980s, Wagner and on-screen husband Don MacLaughlin were relegated to recurring status by new producer, Mary-Ellis Bunim, who wanted to attract a younger audience. She voiced her displeasure at the situation in a 1981 Associated Press article, where she claimed she'd been given one line in three months worth of television.

I had nothing whatsoever to do anymore... I haven't been in the kitchen for a year and a half.

— —Helen Wagner

"There just hasn't been anything to Nancy's character. Anybody could read the lines I've been given," Wagner said.

She and MacLaughlin returned as contract players in 1985. Wagner appeared on contract from April 2, 1956, to June 28, 1956; July 17, 1956, to April 1981, as recurring from April 1981 to March 1985, and again on contract from March 1985 until her death in the spring of 2010.

Wagner highlighted in 1998 that the characters were now "destructive, mean, immoral, unattractive and selfish." "They care about nothing but themselves — me, me, me. That's a dead end. That's no life." She also wished her character hadn't receded into the background in later years while most of the plot developments happened to the younger characters. "I don't like the making of Nancy into only an extra figure at parties," she said. "She is too dynamic a person to be made into a ghost."

The show today may be very au courant, but Nancy isn't, which is a good thing - her values are still about honesty, integrity and courtesy.

— —Helen Wagner

=== Death ===
Nancy as she appeared in 2010

When Wagner died in 2010, the show dedicated two shows to both the actress and the character. In an interview with We Love Soaps, co-star Kathryn Hays commented on her death. "I saw her a couple days before she passed on and she was still herself. She knew how she wanted to be. She was definitely an original. She loved her job, loved her position, and loved her character. Even at the end, when she was in the hospital, she knew she had a call to appear on the show the following week. She asked the doctor if they could get her well enough to be there for her call," Hays said.

=== Legacy ===
Wagner, as well as her character, often garnered positive reviews from critics. New York Times writer Melinda Henneberger described her in 1984 as an "icon for a generation of women". "Nancy was Donna Reed with real problems in the days before soap characters traveled through time, engaged in espionage or almost routinely were reunited with evil twins," she said.
"She's a beloved presence in the soap world," Jason Bonderoff, managing editor of Soap Opera Digest told the Times, who also called her "daytime's answer to Angela Lansbury." Upon her death, New York Times reporter Dennis Hevesi detailed the reason for the actress' longevity. "Ms. Wagner’s Nancy lasted precisely because she remained solid; she wouldn’t join the country club because she considered it elitist, and insisted on cleaning her house because she felt uncomfortable being bossy."

== Storylines ==
Nancy is one of the original characters of the long-running soap, and spoke the first line on the debut episode on April 2, 1956 ("Good morning dear, what would you like for breakfast?"). Show creator Irna Phillips modeled Nancy in the mold of a member of a Greek chorus: someone who stays mostly on the sidelines but nevertheless comments on the crises that more dynamic residents of the town faced. In many respects, Nancy's "moral voice" served to further how Phillips wanted certain characters to be perceived by the public. When Nancy spoke out against her son Bob's ex-wife Lisa in the mid-1960s, the Lisa character became, by and large, the character everyone "loved to hate." Likewise, when Nancy forgave Lisa for her past transgressions in the 1970s, public opinion softened toward Lisa and she became a respected character on the program.

Traditionally a housewife, Nancy was bit by the feminism bug in the late 1970s and worked for a time as a secretary. In the early 1980s, she quit that job and returned to keeping house. For several years she worked as a volunteer at Oakdale Memorial Hospital where her son, Bob, is Chief of Staff.

In 1936, she married attorney Christopher Hughes, and they had four children (three of which were seen on the show; a daughter died while swimming in a pool during a thunderstorm before the series started). Chris died in 1986, shortly after he and Nancy celebrated their fiftieth wedding anniversary. After a considerable mourning period, she married Detective Dan McClosky (Chief of the Oakdale Police Department) in 1987. McClosky developed Alzheimer's disease in 1994 and died two years later. She later enjoyed the company of Joe D'Angelo, as the two developed a strong bond over their frustrations at being unable to help their respective offspring with their ongoing problems. Since McClosky's death, Nancy has lived with her son Dr. Bob Hughes and his wife, Kim, and has spent much of her time with her grandchildren. She is particularly close to her grandson Chris.

Nancy was rarely seen in later years, averaging about three or four appearances a month when the storyline permitted. Unlike other soap actors who have advanced in years (such as Anna Lee and Frances Reid), Helen Wagner had relatively few health problems as she got older, and her lack of appearances on the series were almost solely due to limited storyline. The character made a long-awaited appearance at Tom and Margo's 25th Wedding Anniversary on July 2, 2008.

Much of her screen time in 2006 finds the character "embroiled in a mystery surrounding the publication of a scandalous novel, Oakdale Confidential, which sheds light on the checkered pasts of several characters."

In 2009, Nancy was still active and worked as a volunteer at the hospital. On Thanksgiving 2009, she gives pieces of advice to Katie after the death of Brad. Nancy again showed up just after Christmas when she heard of Casey's upcoming marriage to Alison. She gave him the engagement ring that Chris gave her. When the engagement was broken off, the ring was returned to Nancy, but she insisted that Casey hang onto it.

Nancy was on hand in 2010 to celebrate Bob and Kim's 25th wedding anniversary. Nancy and the rest of the family were all shocked to find out that they really weren't married. She helped Bob and Kim settle their recent differences and was delighted when Frannie returned to see them wed. (This scene is notable for a brief return to the show by Julianne Moore, who began her career playing the role of Frannie in the 1980s.) In Nancy's final appearances on the series, she is seen having breakfast with Casey and Alison, and then giving advice to Katie on coping with Brad's death.

Nancy was quietly written out of the show by having her die in her sleep in her apartment and be found by her son Bob. Episodes that aired August 30 and August 31, 2010, dealt with her death, the former episode depicting news of the death and the latter serving as a memorial.
