= As the World Turns =

American television soap opera (1956–2010)

- Also known as: ATWT
- Genre: Soap opera
- Created by: Irna Phillips
- Written by: Jean Passanante and Lloyd Gold
- Directed by: See below
- Starring: Series cast
- Country of origin: United States
- Original language: English
- No. of seasons: 54
- No. of episodes: 13,858

Production
- Executive producers: Ted Corday (1956–65); Mary Harris (1965–71); Fred Bartholomew (1971–73, 1980–81); Joe Willmore (1973–78); Joe Rothenberger (1978–80); Mary-Ellis Bunim (1981–84); Robert Calhoun (1984–88); Laurence Caso (1988–95); John Valente (1995–96); Felicia Minei Behr (1996–99); Christopher Goutman (1999–2010)
- Producer: See below
- Running time: 30 minutes (1956–75); 60 minutes (1975–2010)
- Production companies: Procter & Gamble Productions, Inc. (1956–2008); TeleNext Media, Inc. (2008–10)

Original release
- Network: CBS
- Release: April 2, 1956 – September 17, 2010

Related
- Another World; The Brighter Day; Guiding Light; The Young and the Restless

As the World Turns (often abbreviated as ATWT) is an American television soap opera that aired on CBS for 54 years from April 2, 1956, to September 17, 2010. Irna Phillips created As the World Turns as a sister show to her other soap opera Guiding Light. With 13,763 hours of cumulative narrative, As the World Turns has the longest total running time of any television show. In terms of continuous run of production, As the World Turns at 54 years holds the fourth-longest run of any daytime network soap opera on American television, surpassed only by General Hospital, Guiding Light, and Days of Our Lives. (Note: By number of episodes. In terms of total duration, As the World Turns has run longer than Guiding Light, at 13,763 hours, versus 3,940 hours and 30 minutes of Guiding Light.) As the World Turns was produced for its first 43 years in Manhattan and in Brooklyn from 2000 until 2010.

Set in the fictional town of Oakdale, Illinois, the show debuted on April 2, 1956, at 1:30 pm EST, airing as a 30-minute serial. Prior to that date, all serials had been 15 minutes in length. As the World Turns and The Edge of Night, which premiered on the same day at 4:30 pm EST, were the first two to be 30 minutes in length from their premieres. At first, viewers were indifferent to the new half-hour serial, but ratings picked up in its second year, eventually reaching the top spot in the daytime Nielsen ratings by fall 1958. In 1959, the show started a streak of weekly ratings wins that was not interrupted for over 12 years. The show switched to color on August 21, 1967, and expanded from a half hour in length to one hour daily starting on December 1, 1975, when The Edge of Night moved to ABC. In the year-to-date ratings, As the World Turns was the most-watched daytime drama from 1958 until 1978, with some 10 million viewers tuning in each day. At its height, core actors such as Helen Wagner, Don MacLaughlin, Don Hastings, and Eileen Fulton became nationally known. Wagner, Hastings, and Fulton are also three of longest-serving actors in the history of American soap operas.

The show passed its 10,000th episode on May 12, 1995, and celebrated its 50th anniversary on April 2, 2006. On September 18, 2009, As the World Turns became the last remaining Procter and Gamble-produced soap opera on television after Guiding Light had aired its finale three days earlier; it would hold this distinction until Beyond the Gates premiered on CBS on February 24, 2025.

On December 8, 2009, CBS announced it was canceling As the World Turns after five decades on the air. From 6.5 million viewers in 1993, the show had an audience of 2.5 million by the time of its cancellation. After the series ended on September 17, 2010, episodes of The Price Is Right, Let's Make a Deal, and The Young and the Restless aired on the time slot for four weeks. On October 18, 2010, CBS replaced As the World Turns with The Talk.

== Premise ==
The original core family, the Hugheses, in the 1980s, clockwise from top left: Kim Sullivan Hughes (Kathryn Hays), Bob Hughes (Don Hastings), Tom Hughes (Gregg Marx), Margo Montgomery Hughes (Hillary Bailey Smith), Andy Dixon (Scott DeFreitas), Frannie Hughes (Julianne Moore) Center: Chris Hughes (Don MacLaughlin) and Nancy Hughes (Helen Wagner)

As the World Turns was the creation of Irna Phillips who, beginning in the 1930s, had been one of the foremost creators and writers of radio soap operas. As a writer, Phillips favored character development and psychological realism over melodrama, and her previous creations (which included Guiding Light) were especially notable for placing professionals – doctors, lawyers, and clergy – at the center of their storylines. Phillips wrote: "As the world turns, we know the bleakness of winter, the promise of spring, the fullness of summer, and the harvest of autumn—the cycle of life is complete."

This was therefore shown in As the World Turns, with its slow-moving psychological character studies of families headed by legal and medical professionals. The personal and professional lives of doctors and lawyers remained central to As the World Turns throughout its run, and eventually became standard fare on many soap operas. Whereas the 15-minute radio soaps often focused on one central, heroic character (for example, Dr. Jim Brent in Phillips' Road of Life), the expanded 30-minute format of As the World Turns enabled Phillips to introduce a handful of professionals within the framework of a family saga.

Phillips' style favored gradual evolution over radical change. Slow, conversational, and emotionally intense, the show moved at the pace of life itself – and sometimes even more slowly than that. Each new addition to the cast was done in a gradual manner and was usually a key contact to one of the members of the Hughes family. As such, the show earned a reputation as being quite conservative, though the show did showcase a gay male character in 1988. During the show's early decades, the content-related policies of its sponsor Procter & Gamble Productions may have contributed to the perception of conservatism. The household products-manufacturing giant typically frowned on storylines in which adultery and other immoral behavior went unpunished, and as late as the 1980s, characters from the primary families were still generally not allowed to go through with abortions.

== Notable history and accomplishments ==
As the World Turns premiered on April 2, 1956. It was the first television daytime drama with a 30-minute running time; all daytime dramas until then had 15-minute running times.

The series was also CBS's first to expand to a 60-minute running time in 1975. By 1958, the program was the number-one daytime drama in the United States, where it remained until 1978. As the World Turns won the Daytime Emmy for Outstanding Drama Series four times in 1987, 1991, 2001, and 2003.

== Cast and characters ==
=== Helen Wagner ===
The first words spoken in As the World Turns in the first episode (aired on April 2, 1956) were "Good morning, dear", said by the character Nancy Hughes, played by actress Helen Wagner.

Wagner was acknowledged by the Guinness Book of Records for having the longest run in a single role on television. She did not play the role without interruption – she was temporarily dropped from the series after the first six months due to conflicts with creator Irna Phillips. Wagner also left the series in 1981, when she felt that writers were not interested in the veteran players and returned as a regular character in 1985.

On the episode broadcast on Monday, August 30, 2010, it was revealed that Nancy had died in her sleep; the next day's episode dealt with Nancy's memorial service. Nancy Hughes's memorial aired just two weeks before the series finale.

== Crossovers ==
Several crossovers have been made between As the World Turns and other serials:

- 1962
  - The character Mitchell Dru (Geoffrey Lumb) was brought to Oakdale after the cancellation of the Procter and Gamble soap The Brighter Day. The same character (and actor) was then transferred to a new P&G soap, Another World, shortly after its premiere in 1964. Another World was originally conceived by Irna Phillips to be a spin-off series of As the World Turns. Like several other characters from Another World, Mitchell Dru "crossed over" for one or more performances on the first Another World spin-off, Somerset, which premiered in March 1970.
- 1965
  - The character Lisa Miller Hughes (Eileen Fulton) was used as the basis to create a primetime spinoff soap Our Private World, (CBS's attempt to duplicate the success of rival network ABC's Peyton Place), with Lisa leaving Oakdale and moving to Chicago, where she married wealthy John Eldridge, but had an affair with his brother Thomas. Though Our Private World only lasted a few months, and Fulton returned to As the World Turns in early 1966, after taking a few months off, remnants of Lisa's time on Our Private World were resurrected 26 years later, when it was revealed in 1992 that Lisa had had a son off-camera, hitherto unknown to viewers, before returning to As the World Turns in 1966. Her son Scott Eldridge tracked her down as an adult and remained on As the World Turns for several years.
- 1999–2003
  - Shortly after NBC canceled Another World on April 12, 1999, with the series finale that aired on June 25 of the same year, the characters of Cass and Lila Winthrop (Stephen Schnetzer and Lisa Peluso), and Jake and Victoria McKinnon (Tom Eplin and Jensen Buchanan) crossed over to As the World Turns briefly. Jake and Vicky intended to move to Oakdale, but Vicky was soon killed off in September 1999, then appeared as a ghost to Jake and Molly from November 2000 to February 2001. Cass only appeared on a recurring basis through 2003 (usually whenever anyone in Oakdale needed an attorney other than resident lawyer Tom Hughes), and Jake (Tom Eplin) remained as a regular on the series until his character was killed off in 2002. Cindy Brooke Harrison (Kim Rhodes) also had minor appearances in 2000 and 2001. Vicky's mother and twin sister, Donna (Anna Stuart) and Marley (Ellen Wheeler, who at the time also directed episodes of As the World Turns), made recurring appearances from 2000 to 2002, and left the show when they gained custody of Jake and Vicky's twin daughters after Jake's death. There were also plans to have a now-teenage Steven Frame (Vicky's son with Jamie Frame) come to Oakdale and live with Jake, but the character was reconceived as teenage Bryant Montgomery, the son of As the World Turns couple Craig and Sierra.

Since 2005, a number of characters have crossed back and forth between As the World Turns and The Young and the Restless:

- 2005
  - As the World Turns: At the request of Oakdale, Illinois, District Attorney Jessica Griffin, Michael Baldwin (Christian LeBlanc) traveled there to serve as the attorney for Jack Snyder (Michael Park) in a custody hearing involving his late wife Julia Larabee's son, JJ. (April 4–5, 2005).

The irony in his appearance in the above-mentioned episodes is that 20 years before, LeBlanc left the role of Kirk McColl, the youngest son of Lisa's fifth husband, Whit McColl (played by Wagon Train star Robert Horton, who was killed off shortly before Fulton's return to the show). So, to many long-time fans of both As the World Turns and The Young and the Restless, seeing LeBlanc as the character from the latter show was weird. History was also made during LeBlanc's appearance on As the World Turns, since both shows are made by different production companies (Bell Dramatic Serial Company for The Young and the Restless; Procter and Gamble for As the World Turns), although they are on the same network.

- 2007
  - The Young and the Restless: Amber Moore (Adrienne Frantz) called on her friend Alison Stewart (Marnie Schulenburg) to help trick Cane Ashby (Daniel Goddard) into marriage. After Amber drugged Cane, Alison dressed up as him for the wedding service. (February 22, 2007)
  - The Young and the Restless: Emily Stewart (Kelley Menighan Hensley) traveled from Oakdale, Illinois, to Genoa City, Wisconsin, in search of information on her sister, Alison Stewart (Marnie Schulenburg). Emily met with Amber Moore (Adrienne Frantz) at the Crimson Lights Coffeehouse, but Amber denied knowing Alison's whereabouts. After Emily was gone, Amber placed a call to Alison as a heads-up.
- 2009–10

On December 8, 2009, CBS canceled As the World Turns after almost 54 years, with the series finale airing on September 17, 2010, making it the last Procter & Gamble soap opera to end until Beyond the Gates premiered on February 24, 2025.

== President Kennedy's assassination ==
The initial CBS News bulletin which interrupted As the World Turns at 1:40 pm (EST), as Nancy (Helen Wagner) talks with Grandpa (Santos Ortega)

On November 22, 1963, the live CBS broadcast of As the World Turns began as always, at 1:30 EST. In this episode, the Hughes family was discussing plans for Thanksgiving. Ten minutes later, a "CBS News Bulletin" slide suddenly appeared on the screen and Walter Cronkite gave the first report of shots being fired at the motorcade in which President Kennedy was travelling.

Here is a bulletin from CBS News: in Dallas, Texas, three shots were fired at President Kennedy's motorcade in downtown Dallas. The first reports say that President Kennedy has been seriously wounded by this shooting. More details just arrived. These details about the same as previously: President Kennedy shot today just as his motorcade left downtown Dallas. Mrs. Kennedy jumped up and grabbed Mr. Kennedy, she called, 'Oh no!'. The motorcade sped on. United Press says that the wounds for President Kennedy perhaps could be fatal. Repeating, a bulletin from CBS News: President Kennedy has been shot by a 'would-be assassin' in Dallas, Texas. Stay tuned to CBS News for further details.

At the end of this bulletin, CBS rejoined As the World Turns which was still in progress. The cast, performing the episode live, was not yet aware of the rapidly-developing situation. However, just before Don Hastings and Henderson Forsythe began the third scene of the show, Hastings overheard cameraman Phil Polansky talking to the control room through a headset: "Don't tell the actors what? The President's been shot?" The actors received their cues and began the scene while Walter Cronkite was in the midst of reporting further information from Dallas. CBS then returned to the show in the middle of the third scene, which would be the last regular program viewed by the television audience that day. During the commercial break that followed, the "CBS News Bulletin" slide appeared again and Cronkite resumed with audio-only reports of the developments in Dallas until the top of the hour when CBS News was ready to go on the air with video. Once the episode came to a close with Eileen Fulton in the final scene, the cast was finally informed of the news.

As NBC and ABC, the other two major American TV networks, were not programming in that timeslot then (the 1:30–2:00 ET period belonging to their local affiliates), As the World Turns has the distinction of being the last regular American network program broadcast for the next four days as the assassination and funeral of President Kennedy and the transition of power to President Lyndon B. Johnson took center stage.

== Broadcast history ==
As the World Turns enjoyed a virtually uninterrupted reign as the highest-rated soap from 1958 to 1978, tying for first place with NBC Daytime's Another World (1973–1974, 1977–1978) and Days of Our Lives (1973–1974). By the mid-1960s, it was so firmly entrenched that its strongest competition, Let's Make a Deal, despite developing a devoted fan base in its own right and becoming one of daytime's most popular game shows, could not come close to matching it in the Nielsens.

Its strength was such that ABC ran hour-long drama reruns in the 1:00–2:00 pm. (noon–1:00 Central) slot in the mid-1960s and NBC, after losing Deal to ABC in 1968, ran a total of eight shows, all short-lived (with the exception of Three on a Match, which lasted three years), against As the World Turns and Let's Make a Deal from that point until 1975.

As that year began, Another World was expanded to 60 minutes, with its first hour-long episode airing on January 6, 1975. Although this did not directly affect As the World Turns, as the two shows were not in competition for anything other than the overall ratings win, CBS' afternoon lineup suffered some ratings damage as the popular soap put a dent in the ratings of two popular afternoon game shows, The Price Is Right and Match Game 75. NBC, pleased by the success that the expansion of Another World had brought to the network, elected to do the same thing with Days of Our Lives beginning on April 21, 1975; this put Days of Our Lives and As the World Turns in direct competition for ratings. Incidentally, the expansions were occurring six and a half years after the last two 15-minute serials, Search for Tomorrow and The Guiding Light, expanded to 30 minutes.

CBS considered expanding As the World Turns and Search for Tomorrow to 45 minutes (eliminating the timeslot during which stations broadcast local or syndicated programs), but eventually decided to expand As the World Turns, its front-runner in the ratings battle, to a full-hour length. Initially, in order to free up the necessary 30 minutes to do so, CBS returned The Price Is Right, which had been paired with Match Game for the previous two years as part of the network's successful 3 p.m. game show block, to the morning. However, CBS changed course and decided that it would also attempt an expansion of Price to 60 minutes; this meant that, if the plans to expand As the World Turns were to go as anticipated, CBS would need to cancel a program to free up that 30 minutes of airtime it needed.

At the time CBS was having ratings trouble with The Edge of Night. Procter & Gamble had demanded that CBS give the serial the 2:30 p.m. slot following The Guiding Light in 1972, moving it from the 3:30 p.m. slot it had held since 1963. This decision proved to be a grave mistake. The Edge of Night, which had a much younger and more male-centric audience than almost any other serial on television when the move was made, lost a large portion of its audience, especially to NBC's The Doctors, at the height of its popularity at the time. In addition, the rest of CBS' drama lineup was performing well in the ratings and the network could not move the long-running serial to another timeslot without risking preemption from local affiliates, which would almost certainly have driven ratings even lower.

At the same time, ABC expressed interest in picking up The Edge of Night for its own lineup as it had been interested in carrying a P&G-produced serial for some time, supplementing its in-house productions. An agreement was struck between CBS, Procter & Gamble, and ABC to get the necessary 30 minutes for the As the World Turns expansion. CBS would not renew The Edge of Night once its contract was up, Procter & Gamble would move the serial to ABC, and thus As the World Turns could go ahead with its expansion.

However, a major issue arose that halted the planned shuffle. CBS was contracted to air The Edge of Night until December 1975, and ABC had no place in its schedule to put it at the time. This forced CBS to temporarily postpone expanding As the World Turns and keep The Edge of Night until ABC could find a timeslot for it. Finally, in November, ABC agreed that The Edge of Night would join its lineup on December 1, replacing the game show You Don't Say! at 4:00 p.m. (closer to its pre-1972 timeslots) and keeping the serial's continuity intact. And thus, As the World Turns became CBS' first 60-minute daytime serial.

The first half of the newly-expanded show continued to perform well against Let's Make a Deal on ABC, which the network moved to the noon/11 a.m. timeslot within four weeks of the expansion. The second half put As the World Turns in competition with ABC's most-popular game show, The $10,000 Pyramid, which had done well against Guiding Light since the network moved it to 2:00 p.m. in December 1974 and kept doing so against As the World Turns. Although the expansion was not a complete success, at the end of the season, the serial was again at the top of the daytime Nielsens, despite a 1.4-point drop from the year before.

Although the eventual hit game show Family Feud ran against As the World Turns from July 12, 1976, until April 22, 1977, it did not become a hit for ABC until its move to the mornings. Only when ABC made its first move to a one-hour soap with All My Children did trouble really begin for As the World Turns and NBC's ( Days of Our Lives), since ABC kept that serial's starting time at 1:00/noon, meaning that fans of that serial who tuned to NBC or CBS would miss the last half of that day's storyline (or, contrariwise, would not, if they watched until the mid-program commercial break and then changed channels, pick up the As the World Turns or Days of Our Lives activities from the episode's beginning, since ABC strategically placed its break several minutes after, rather than exactly at, the bottom of the hour). Further, All My Children's emphasis on youth-oriented, sexier storylines provided a sharp contrast to the domestic, almost quaint tone of As the World Turns (and to a lesser degree, the melodramatic, somewhat topical Days). On January 16, 1978, ABC ballooned its decade-old One Life to Live to the 2:00 PM/1:00 p.m. starting time, compounding the other networks' headaches. These factors helped contribute to the fall of As the World Turns from the top spot in the ratings at the end of the 1978-79 season. After finishing the previous season tied with Another World for number one in the Nielsens, As the World Turns fell to fourth behind All My Children, General Hospital, and The Young and the Restless.

On February 4, 1980, CBS moved and expanded The Young and the Restless to a full hour after the cancellation of the long-tenured Love of Life. The Young and the Restless moved from noon/11:00 a.m. to 1:00 p.m./noon (the former affiliate break timeslot) and As the World Turns was bumped up to 2:00/1:00 p.m. and Guiding Light to 3:00/2:00 p.m. On June 8, 1981, As the World Turns returned to its traditional 1:30/12:30 p.m. start time with Search for Tomorrow following at 2:30/1:30 p.m. and The Young and the Restless leading off the serial lineup at either noon/11:00 a.m. or 12:30 p.m./11:30 a.m. (depending on affiliate preference).

As the World Turns remained at 1:30/12:30 p.m. until March 20, 1987, when CBS cancelled the five-year-old Capitol in favor of The Bold and the Beautiful. CBS scheduled it at 1:30/12:30 p.m., and finally settled As the World Turns at 2:00/1:00 p.m., where it remained until its final network episode in September 2010. Although facing the full length of Another World and One Life to Live once again, the Douglas Marland era of 1985 to 1993 had a resurgence in ratings, and by 1991, it was back in its once-habitual top-four placing. As the World Turns survived NBC's cancellation of its sister series Another World in 1999.

=== Cancellation and final episode ===
On December 8, 2009, CBS confirmed that it would not renew As the World Turns. The final CBS episode was taped on June 23, 2010, at JC Studios in Brooklyn, and aired on September 17, 2010. The final scene showed Dr. Bob Hughes (played by Don Hastings) retiring from Oakdale Memorial Hospital. In the scene, Bob is packing up his office and talking to his wife, Kim Hughes (Kathryn Hays). She leaves and tells Bob to take as much time as he needed to say goodbye. Bob looked around, put his nameplate in his briefcase, and spoke the show's final line, "Good night." That line was a bookend to the beginning of the show in 1956, and the first line spoken, "Good morning." The camera panned to the globe on Bob's desk spinning – a reference to the show's title – before the final fade-out.

== Ratings ==
Series ratings

One example of the drastic change in daytime television can be found in the following:

- Daytime history: Highest rated week (November 16–20, 1981)
- (Household ratings – Nielsen Media Research)

Rank/serial	Household rating	(Time slot) Network
1. General Hospital	16.0	(3–4pm) ABC
2. All My Children	10.2	(1–2pm) ABC
3. One Life to Live	10.2	(2–3pm) ABC
4. Guiding Light	7.5	(3–4pm) CBS
5. The Young and the Restless	7.0	(12:30–1:30pm) CBS

1995 ratings

Rank/serial	Millions of viewers
1. The Young and the Restless	7.2
2. All My Children	5.891
3. General Hospital	5.343
4. The Bold and the Beautiful	5.247
5. One Life to Live	5.152

As the World Turns spent a record-breaking 20 years on top of the Nielsen ratings for American daytime soap operas, from 1958 to 1978. It would retain this record until The Young and the Restless broke it in 2008 when it remained #1 for 21 years and counting.

Years as #1 series

Year(s)	Household rating
1958–1959	9.8
1959–1960	9.9
1960–1961	10.4
1961–1962	11.9
1962–1963	13.7
1963–1964	15.4
1964–1965	14.5
1965–1966	13.9
1966–1967	12.7
1967–1968	13.6
1968–1969	13.8
1969–1970	13.6
1970–1971	12.4
1971–1972	11.1
1972–1973	10.6
1973–1974	9.7 (tied with Days of Our Lives and Another World)
1974–1975	10.8
1975–1976	9.4
1976–1977	9.9
1977–1978	8.6 (tied with Another World)

Record low: 1,773,000 viewers on December 25, 2009 (Nielsen Media Research)

1956–1957 season

- 1. The Guiding Light 11.4
- 7. As the World Turns 8.4 (Debut)

1957–1958 season

- 1. The Guiding Light 10.1
- 6. As the World Turns 8.4

1978–1979 season

- 1. All My Children 9.0
- 4. As the World Turns 8.2

1979–1980 season

- 1. General Hospital 9.9
- 6. As the World Turns 7.9

1980–1981 season

- 1. General Hospital 11.4
- 5. As the World Turns 7.9

1981–1982 season

- 1. General Hospital 11.2
- 5. As the World Turns 7.4 (tied with The Young and the Restless)

1982–1983 season

- 1. General Hospital 9.8
- 5. As the World Turns 7.6

1983–1984 season

- 1. General Hospital 10.0
- 6. As the World Turns 7.9

1984–1985 season

- 1. General Hospital 9.1
- 6. As the World Turns 7.1 (tied with Days of Our Lives)

1985–1986 season

- 1. General Hospital 9.2
- 7. As the World Turns 6.7

1986–1987 season

- 1. General Hospital 8.3
- 4. As the World Turns 7.0 (tied with All My Children and Days of Our Lives)

1987–1988 season

- 1. The Young and the Restless 8.1 (tied with General Hospital)
- 6. As the World Turns 6.6

1988–1989 season

- 1. The Young and the Restless 8.1
- 6. As the World Turns 6.4

1989–1990 season

- 1. The Young and the Restless 8.0
- 5. As the World Turns 5.8

1990–1991 season

- 1. The Young and the Restless 8.1
- 4. As the World Turns 5.9

1991–1992 season

- 1. The Young and the Restless 8.2
- 3. As the World Turns 5.8 (tied with General Hospital)

1992–1993 season

- 1. The Young and the Restless 8.4
- 4. As the World Turns 5.7

1993–1994 season

- 1. The Young and the Restless 8.6
- 5. As the World Turns 5.8

1994–1995 season

- 1. The Young and the Restless 7.5
- 7. As the World Turns 5.1

1995–1996 season

- 1. The Young and the Restless 7.7
- 7. As the World Turns 4.4

1996–1997 season

- 1. The Young and the Restless 7.1
- 6. As the World Turns 4.4

1997–1998 season

- 1. The Young and the Restless 7.0
- 6. As the World Turns 4.1

1998–1999 season

- 1. The Young and the Restless 6.9
- 6. As the World Turns 3.8

1999–2000 season

- 1. The Young and the Restless 6.8
- 6. As the World Turns 3.8

2000–2001 season

- 1. The Young and the Restless 5.8
- 6. As the World Turns 3.3

2001–2002 season

- 1. The Young and the Restless 5.0
- 5. As the World Turns 3.5

2002–2003 season

- 1. The Young and the Restless 4.7
- 7. As the World Turns 2.9

2003–2004 season

- 1. The Young and the Restless 4.4
- 6. As the World Turns 2.9 (tied with One Life to Live)

2004–2005 season

- 1. The Young and the Restless 4.2
- 7. As the World Turns 2.6

2005–2006 season

- 1. The Young and the Restless 4.2
- 5. As the World Turns 2.7

2006–2007 season

- 1. The Young and the Restless 4.2
- 7. As the World Turns 2.1

2007–2008 season

- 1. The Young and the Restless 4.0
- 3. As the World Turns 2.4

2008–2009 season

- 1. The Young and the Restless 3.7
- 7. As the World Turns 1.9

2009–2010 season

- 1. The Young and the Restless 3.7
- 7. As the World Turns 1.8

== Schedule ==
CBS:

- April 2, 1956 – November 28, 1975: 1:30–2:00 PM (12:30–1:00 PM, CT/PT)
- December 1, 1975 – February 1, 1980: 1:30–2:30 PM (12:30–1:30 PM, CT/PT)
- February 4, 1980 – June 5, 1981: 2:00–3:00 PM (1:00–2:00 PM, CT/PT)
- June 8, 1981 – March 20, 1987: 1:30–2:30 PM (12:30–1:30 PM, CT/PT)
- March 23, 1987 – September 17, 2010: 2:00–3:00 PM (1:00–2:00 PM, CT/PT)

== Main crew ==
=== Executive producers ===
Name
Ted Corday
Mary Harris
Fred Bartholomew
Joe Willmore
Joe Rothenberger
Fred Bartholomew
Mary-Ellis Bunim
Robert Calhoun
Laurence Caso
John Valente
Felicia Minei Behr
Christopher Goutman

=== Head writers ===
Name
Irna Phillips
Irna Phillips and William J. Bell
Katherine Babecki
Joe Kane and Ralph Ellis
Winifred Wolfe
Katherine L. Phillips
Winifred Wolfe and Warren Swanson
Warren Swanson, Elizabeth Tillman, and John Boruff
David Lesan and Irna Phillips
Robert Soderberg and Edith Sommer
Ralph Ellis and Eugenie Hunt
Douglas Marland
Bridget and Jerome Dobson
Paul Roberts
Tom King and K.C. Collier
Bridget and Jerome Dobson
Caroline Franz and John Saffron
John Saffron
Tom King and Millee Taggart
Cynthia Benjamin and Susan Bedsow Horgan
Susan Bedsow Horgan
Douglas Marland (Robert Calhoun during 1988 WGA strike)
Juliet Law Packer and Richard Backus
Juliet Law Packer, Garin Wolf and Richard Culliton
Richard Culliton
Stephen Black and Henry Stern
Stephen Demorest, Mel Brez and Addie Walsh
Jessica Klein
Stephen Demorest, Mel Brez and Addie Walsh
Addie Walsh
Lorraine Broderick, Hal Corley and Addie Walsh (co-headwriters)
Leah Laiman and Carolyn Culliton (co-headwriter)
Hogan Sheffer, Carolyn Culliton, Hal Corley and Stephen Demorest (co-headwriters)
Hogan Sheffer, Jean Passanante and Carolyn Culliton
Hogan Sheffer and Jean Passanante
Jean Passanante, Leah Laiman and Christopher Whitesell
Jean Passanante and Leah Laiman
Christopher Goutman (2007 WGA strike)
Jean Passanante and Leah Laiman
Jean Passanante and David Kreizman
Jean Passanante and Lloyd Gold

=== Crew at cancellation ===
- Writing Team: Jean Passanante, Lloyd Gold, Leah Laiman, Cheryl Davis, Susan Dansby, David A. Levinson, Gordon Rayfield, Dan Mooney, Gigi Swift, Janet Iacobuzio, Josh Griffith
- Producing Team: Christopher Goutman, Carole Shure, Jennifer Schacor, Vivian Gundaker, Sarah Shaker, Sonia Blangiardo
- Directing Team: Michael Eilbaum, John O'Connell, Jennifer Pepperman, Matthew Griffin, Maria Wagner, Habib Azar, Sonia Blangiardo, Ian Toporoff, Christopher Goutman, Michael Kerner, Carol Sedwick, Janet Andrews, James Kowal, Brian Lydell, Jennifer Blood, Nancy Barron, Alexandra Roalsvig, Brett Hellman
- Casting Director: Mary Clay Boland

== International broadcast ==
In South Africa, As the World Turns aired on SABC2 from June 2010 to February 2012 from 14:10 to 15:00 each weekday. Episodes were four years behind the original U.S. broadcast. In Canada, As the World Turns aired on ONtv, and, later, Global Television Network, and on NTV in Newfoundland and Labrador. In Jamaica, As The World Turns started airing on Television Jamaica Monday to Friday 1:00 pm beginning in 2011. In Belize, As the World Turns was seen on Great Belize Television at 2:00 pm Central Time, usually the same day as the U.S. telecasts. In New Zealand, As The World Turns was aired on TVNZ 1 from 1962 to 1989. In Australia, As The World Turns was aired on Network Ten first at 1.30 pm, then moved to 5:00 pm before ultimately being dropped entirely in 1987. In the Netherlands, As The World Turns was popular and aired for more than 20 years. From 1989 till its cancellation, it was the best watched daytime soap. In 2010 Terri Conn, Martha Byrne, Marnie Schulenburg, Trent Dawson, Grayson McCouch and Van Hansis visited the Netherlands and were special guests at the "Farewell ATWT" meeting. Elizabeth Hubbard even guest-starred in the Dutch soap "Goede Tijden, Slechte Tijden" for a while, after the cancellation of ATWT.

== InTurn ==
In 2006, CBS launched a reality show called InTurn on their broadband channel innertube, the winner of which would go on to receive a 13-week acting contract on As the World Turns. The eventual winner of InTurn was Alex Charak, an 18-year-old "Student/Pizza Transportation Artist" from New York. Charak made his debut as the character Elwood Hoffman on September 26, 2006. A one-hour "best-of" show aired on CBS on November 24, 2006.

CBS launched InTurn 2 in the summer of 2007. For the new season, the age restrictions expanded to allow for middle-aged viewers to participate, and there were nine competitors instead of eight. The winner of the second season was Ryan Serhant, a recent graduate of Hamilton College. Serhant made his debut in the contract role on November 7, 2007. He plays Evan Walsh IV, son of Evan Walsh III. He is a young hotshot biochemist prodigy who comes home to Oakdale to try to convince Craig Montgomery to invest in the cutting edge biomedical tech field. He began taping on September 24, 2007, two days after the close of his off-Broadway play Purple Hearts.

Inturn 3 began airing in April 2008 and featured 17 episodes.

== Awards ==
=== Writers Guild of America Awards ===
- 2007 "Best Daytime Serial" Written by Jean Passanante, Leah Laiman, Christopher Whitesell, Courtney Simon, Anna Cascio, Lisa Connor, Paula Cwikly, Hogan Sheffer, Judy Tate, Bettina Bradbury, Richard Culliton, Susan Dansby, Judith Donato, Josh Griffith, Elizabeth Page, Melissa Salmons, Charlotte Gibson; CBS Daytime

=== Daytime Emmy Awards ===
As the World Turns won 43 Daytime Emmys:

==== Show ====
- 1987 "Outstanding Drama Series"
- 1991 "Outstanding Drama Series"
- 1993 "Outstanding Directing Team"
- 1999 "Outstanding Original Song" (tied with General Hospital)
- 2001 "Outstanding Drama Series"
- 2001 "Outstanding Writing Team"
- 2002 "Outstanding Writing Team"
- 2003 "Outstanding Drama Series"
- 2004 "Outstanding Writing Team"
- 2005 "Outstanding Achievement in Casting for a Drama Series"
- 2005 "Outstanding Writing Team"
- 2007 "Outstanding Directing Team"

==== Individuals ====
- 1984 "Outstanding Supporting Actor in a Drama Series" Justin Deas (Tom Hughes)
- 1984 "Outstanding Lead Actor in a Drama Series" Larry Bryggman (Dr. John Dixon)
- 1985 "Outstanding Juvenile Male in a Drama Series" Brian Bloom (Dusty Donovan)
- 1986 "Outstanding Supporting Actor in a Drama Series" John Wesley Shipp (Doug Cummings)
- 1987 "Outstanding Ingenue in a Drama Series" Martha Byrne (Lily Walsh)
- 1987 "Outstanding Supporting Actor in a Drama Series" Gregg Marx (Tom Hughes)
- 1987 "Outstanding Lead Actor in a Drama Series" Larry Bryggman (Dr. John Dixon)
- 1988 "Outstanding Ingenue in a Drama Series" Julianne Moore (Frannie Hughes/Sabrina Hughes)
- 1990 "Outstanding Juvenile Male in a Drama Series" Andrew Kavovit (Paul Ryan)
- 2001 "Outstanding Supporting Actress in a Drama Series" Lesli Kay (Molly Conlan)
- 2001 "Outstanding Lead Actress in a Drama Series" Martha Byrne (Lily Walsh Snyder/Rose D'Angelo)
- 2003 "Outstanding Supporting Actor in a Drama Series" Benjamin Hendrickson (Hal Munson)
- 2004 "Lifetime Achievement Award" Eileen Fulton (Lisa Grimaldi)
- 2004 "Lifetime Achievement Award" Don Hastings (Bob Hughes)
- 2004 "Lifetime Achievement Award" Helen Wagner (Nancy Hughes)
- 2004 "Outstanding Supporting Actress in a Drama Series" Cady McClain (Rosanna Cabot)
- 2006 "Outstanding Younger Actress in a Drama Series" Jennifer Landon (Gwen Norbeck Munson)
- 2007 "Outstanding Younger Actress in a Drama Series" Jennifer Landon (Gwen Norbeck Munson)
- 2007 "Outstanding Lead Actress in a Drama Series" Maura West (Carly Tenney Snyder)
- 2008 "Outstanding Younger Actress in a Drama Series" Jennifer Landon (Gwen Norbeck Munson)
- 2010 "Outstanding Supporting Actress in a Drama Series" Julie Pinson (Janet Ciccone Snyder)
- 2010 "Outstanding Lead Actress in a Drama Series" Maura West (Carly Tenney Snyder)
- 2010 "Outstanding Lead Actor in a Drama Series" Michael Park (Jack Snyder)
- 2011 "Outstanding Lead Actor in a Drama Series" Michael Park (Jack Snyder)

=== Other awards ===
In 2010, As the World Turns was nominated for a GLAAD Media Award for "Outstanding Daily Drama" during the 21st GLAAD Media Awards.

== American daytime television firsts ==
- In 1988, the serial made American daytime television history by introducing its first gay male character, Hank Elliot (played by Brian Starcher).
- In 2007, Luke Snyder and Noah Mayer (played by Van Hansis and Jake Silbermann, respectively) shared the first gay male kiss on American daytime television. They formed a relationship and became the first gay male couple on American daytime television, consummating their relationship on January 12, 2009.

== Supercouples ==
- Jeff Baker and Penny Hughes
- Bob Hughes and Kim Sullivan
- Tom Hughes and Margo Montgomery
- Steve Andropoulos and Betsy Stewart
- Holden Snyder and Lily Walsh
- Jack Snyder and Carly Tenney
- Luke Snyder and Noah Mayer
- Will Munson and Gwen Norbeck

== In popular culture ==
=== Television ===
- On Saturday Night Live, a sketch called "As World Turn" was created in 1989.
- On the TV series Tom & Jerry Kids, while Tom watches Nine Lives to Live, Jerry changes it to As the Cheese Turns.
- In the 1960s–'70s The Carol Burnett Show featured a recurring sketch called "As the Stomach Turns", a parody of As the World Turns and soap operas in general.
- On All in the Family, Edith Bunker would occasionally mention wanting to watch The Secret Storm, but after that soap opera was canceled, she would later mention As the World Turns as a viewing preference.
- In the pulp series The Destroyer #22 "Brain Drain" by Warren Murphy and Richard Sapir, it was revealed that Chiun is a big fan of the soap opera As the Planet Revolves and constantly sits glued in front of the television to catch the broadcast.
- Children's television network Nickelodeon once featured a series of shorts entitled As Our School Bus Turns, with the (actually unconnected) episodes taking place aboard a school bus. Each episode would end with a stereotypical soap opera cliffhanger.
- In 1993, the PBS children's show Mister Rogers' Neighborhood featured a parody soap opera in the Neighborhood of Make-Believe called "As the Museum Turns", starring Lady Elaine Fairchild of the Museum Go Round.
- The show is mentioned in Mad Men in Season 2: 'A Night to Remember', set in 1962. The character Joan Holloway tells a client of Sterling Cooper, Maytag, they should buy airtime for ads, as she has read the scripts for the show and knows the show will get popular.
- The Muppets character dog Doctor Rowlf in Veterinarians Hospital was inspired by Doctor Bob Hughes.
- In an episode of SpongeBob SquarePants, "The Masterpiece". Squidward watches the soap opera called "As the Tide Turns".
- Season 1, Episode 21 of Sabrina the Teenage Witch is titled "As Westbridge Turns" (Westbridge is the fictional school attended by the characters).

=== Music ===
- In 1999, Eminem recorded the song "As the World Turns" as part of his album The Slim Shady LP.

== DVD release ==
In October 2011, SoapClassics released a four-DVD collection of 20 selected episodes, marking the first time that any As the World Turns episodes were available on any recorded medium. The oldest episode on the collection dates from September 29, 1979, while the latest episode was from April 10, 2010.

In November 2011, a Christmas in Oakdale DVD was released, celebrating five Christmas episodes from the show. The featured Christmases are 1985, 1992, 1995, 2000 and 2007.

A "CarJack" collection was also released, celebrating supercouple Carly and Jack in 10 of their most memorable episodes.

The Holden and Lily Story collection had 10 of their most memorable episodes.

Farewell to Oakdale had the final 10 episodes of the series.

The James Stenbeck Story collection had 10 of his most memorable episodes.

The "As the World Turns – The Wedding of Bob and Kim" DVD collection contained 10 episodes which aired April 2–15, 1985 that featured the bachelor party, the wedding ceremony, and the reception of Bob Hughes and Kim Sullivan, as played by Don Hastings and Kathryn Hays. This collection was only available online.

== See also ==
- History of As the World Turns
- List of longest-running United States television series
