= Helen Wagner =

American actress (1918–2010)

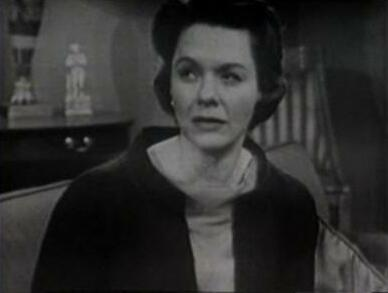
- Wagner as Nancy Hughes McClosky (1956)
- Born: Helen Losee Wagner; September 3, 1918; Lubbock, Texas, U.S.
- Died: May 1, 2010 (aged 91)
- Education: Monmouth College
- Occupations: Television actress; theatre performer; singer
- Years active: 1952–2010
- Known for: Actress
- Spouse: Robert Willey (1954–2009; his death)
- Awards: Emmy, Lifetime Achievement, 2004

Helen Losee Wagner (September 3, 1918 – May 1, 2010) was an American actress.

Born in Lubbock, Texas, she is best known for her role as Nancy Hughes McClosky on the soap opera As the World Turns. After appearing in the soap opera for some 50 years, at the time of her death she was the longest serving actor on an American soap opera. She played the role of Trudy Bauer during the initial TV years of Guiding Light in the early 1950s. She appeared on the early soap Valiant Lady, as well as on primetime programs including The World of Mr. Sweeney, Mister Peepers, Inner Sanctum, and the Philco-Goodyear Playhouse.

== Biography ==
Wagner was born on September 3, 1918, in Lubbock, Texas, as one of two daughters of Charles and Janette (née Tinker) Wagner. She studied music and drama at Monmouth College in Illinois where she graduated with a Bachelor of Arts degree in 1938.

Before signing a 13-week contract for As the World Turns in 1956, Wagner had been a singer and stage actress, sometimes working as a church soloist to pay the rent. She had roles in the stage plays Sunny River, Oklahoma! and The Bad Seed, on Broadway.

In 1954, she married Robert Willey, an actor and theater producer. He died in 2009. Wagner died of cancer on May 1, 2010, at the age of 91.

== As the World Turns ==
Wagner played the soap opera's matriarch, Nancy Hughes, from its debut on April 2, 1956, until her death. She was acknowledged in Guinness World Records for having the longest run in a single role on television, a position she held until 2010.

Wagner spoke the show's very first line, "Good morning, dear."

On November 22, 1963, Wagner inadvertently became part of broadcast history. About ten minutes into that day's episode of As the World Turns, a scene featuring her character was interrupted by Walter Cronkite's first news bulletin that President John F. Kennedy had been shot in Dallas (this bulletin was audio only, as the studio camera was not ready until 20 minutes later). Wagner later remembered that she and actor Santos Ortega, who played Grandpa Hughes, continued with the scene as it was broadcast live, unaware of the unfolding tragedy until they were told about it during a commercial break.

Helen Wagner as Nancy Hughes in 2009

After the death of costar and onscreen husband Don McLaughlin in 1986, the Nancy Hughes character became a widow. She later met and married Dan McClosky (Dan Frazer) and was subsequently part of a storyline in which Dan was diagnosed with Alzheimer's disease. After it culminated in Dan's death, Wagner faced many years with little to no part in the story. She returned to the screen with a pivotal role in a 2004 storyline revolving around her grandson's marriage to naïve teenager Alison Stewart (played by Jessica Dunphy). In 2005, 2006, and 2007, Wagner averaged around three appearances a month on the serial. She was prominently featured in the show's 50th anniversary episode in April 2006.

Wagner's death came less than two months before As The World Turns taped its final episode. CBS announced on December 9, 2009, that it was cancelling the show after 54 years on the air. Many fans had hoped that Wagner would be able to close the series with the line "Good night, dear," just as she had uttered "Good morning, dear" as the first line of the program back in 1956. The last episode was taped on June 23, 2010, and aired on September 17, 2010.

She was presented with a "Lifetime Achievement" Emmy by the National Academy of Television Arts and Sciences in May 2004.

== Filmography ==
=== Television ===
Year	Title	Role	Notes
1950–1951	The Web	Unknown role	Episode: "Key Witness" (1950); Episode: "Star Witness" (1951)
1951	Starlight Theatre	Unknown role	Episode: "Flaxen-Haired Mannequin"
1951	The Philco Television Playhouse	Unknown role	Episode: "Mr. Arcularis"; Episode: "Women of Intrigue"
1952	Hallmark Hall of Fame	Unknown role	Episode: Crabapple Saint
1952	Mister Peepers	Nurse Johnson	Episode: Unsold pilot
1952–1953	Guiding Light	Trudy Bauer Palmer #3	Daytime serial (contract role)
1953	Mister Peepers	Spokesperson	15 episodes (she did not play a character on the show but did commercial segments promoting Reynolds aluminum wrap)
1953–1954	Valiant Lady	Jane Lyman	Daytime serial (contract role)
1954	The Philco Television Playhouse	Inez	Episode: "The Dancers"
1954	The Kate Smith Hour	Marge Franklin	Episode: "Bill Hayes, 'The World of Mr. Sweeney' segment featuring Charlie Ruggles"
1954	Inner Sanctum	Midge; Teacher	Episode: "Never Die Alone"; Episode: "Cat Calls"
1954–1955	The World of Mr. Sweeney	Marge Franklin	Cast member The series began as a segment from season 4 on The Kate Smith Hour
1956–1981, 1983, 1985–2010	As the World Turns	Nancy Hughes McClosky	Daytime serial (contract and recurring role)

== Alma mater ==
In 1988, Wagner's alma mater, Monmouth College (Illinois), awarded her an honorary degree of "Doctor of Humane Letters". The following year, Wagner chaired a national committee that raised more than $1 million to replace the school's "little theater" with a state-of-the-art facility. On opening night in Monmouth's new Wells Theater, Wagner played the role of Eleanor in The Lion in Winter.
