= Eli Grant =

Fictional character from soap opera Days of Our Lives

- Days of Our Lives character
- Portrayed by: Lamon Archey
- Duration: 2017–present
- First appearance: February 23, 2017
- Created by: Dena Higley and Ryan Quan
- Introduced by: Ken Corday, Albert Alarr and Greg Meng
- Spin-off appearances: Days of Our Lives: Beyond Salem (2021)
In-universe information
- Other names: Elijah Grant (full name)
- Occupation: FBI agent (until 2017; since 2022); Police detective (2017–2022); Security consultant (2019–2020)
- Father: David Banning
- Mother: Valerie Grant
- Half-brothers: Scotty Banning
- Wife: Lani Price (2020–present)
- Sons: David Grant; Carver Grant
- Daughters: Jules Grant
- Grandparents: Paul Grant; Helen Grant; David Martin; Julie Olson Williams; Scott Banning (adoptive); Janet Banning (adoptive); Doug Williams (step)
- Uncles: Danny Grant; Dickie Martin
- Other relatives: Hope Williams Brady; Jennifer Horton; Tom Horton; Alice Horton; JJ Deveraux

Eli Grant is a fictional character from Days of Our Lives, an American soap opera on the NBC network, portrayed by Lamon Archey. The character made his first appearance on February 23, 2017, and was introduced as the son of established character, Valerie Grant (Vanessa Williams) and the previously unknown grandson of Julie Olson Williams (Susan Seaforth Hayes). As Valerie's son with Julie's late son David Banning (Gregg Marx), Eli is the product of daytime's first interracial romance, and the first African-American member of the show's core family, the Hortons.

Though he is embraced by Julie and his new family, it puts a strain on his budding romance with Gabi Hernandez (Camila Banus). However, the relationship ultimately falls apart due to Eli's one-night-stand with his co-worker Lani Price (Sal Stowers) which culminates in the birth of their stillborn son. Eli falls for Lani but she struggles fearing the feelings are only due to their shared grief. After interference from Eli's friend Sheila (Tionne "T-Boz" Watkins), the couple finally make it official and start dating. In 2019, their failed wedding leaves Eli devastated when a vengeful Gabi blackmails Lani into dumping him at the altar. The couple reunite in 2020 and are finally married later that year. They go onto have twins a boy and girl an over year later into their marriage.

While the reception to the writing for the character's introduction was less positive, Archey's portrayal quickly won many fans and critics over. Eli and Lani's romance also became quite popular with viewers. The pair go on to make Days of Our Lives history in 2020 when they become the first African-American couple to marry on-screen.

== Storylines ==
In 2017, Eli confronts his mother Valerie about David Banning, his biological father. Furious, Eli reveals he's known about his paternity since he applied to the FBI Academy and Val explains that David wasn't fit to be a father. He later forces Val to tell his grandmother Julie the truth. While Julie and her family welcome Eli, he struggles to forgive Valerie. Eli's cousin Abigail (Marci Miller) sets him up on a failed blind date with Gabi Hernandez. Despite encouragement from Val's boyfriend Abe Carver (James Reynolds) and his daughter Lani Price, Eli still can't forgive Val. He later agrees to use his connections to help his cousin JJ Deveraux (Casey Moss) breakup the local mob war. Eli heads up the investigation which doesn't sit well with Lani. He also comforts Gabi as she struggles to get over Chad DiMera (Billy Flynn) and grieves the loss of her dad when goes to prison. Despite warnings from Julie and Abigail, Eli is determined to continue seeing Gabi and wants to help her get over Chad. Eli serves as a federal liaison in a drug investigation when Lani is exposed to a synthetic drug and also helps Lani cope with her withdrawal syndrome in secret. After being ambushed with a breakfast date orchestrated by Abe and Gabi, Eli begins to understand Val's actions but he still needs time work through his feelings. Eli travels to Greece with Lani, JJ and Gabi to apprehend Deimos Kiriakis (Vincent Irizarry) where he witnesses a close moment between Chad and Gabi and breaks up with her. On the way back to Salem, the plane crashes and the group is stranded along with Sonny Kiriakis (Freddie Smith) his boyfriend Paul Narita (Christopher Sean). Eli disappears after he goes to radio for help and returns to reveal that Paul stabbed him. Sonny keeps Eli from killing Paul as they realize he has contracted jungle madness. Eli later serves as a listening ear when Lani has doubts about her relationship with JJ. At Paul's request, Eli agrees to kill him if he tries to harm anyone else but they are soon rescued. Back home Lani convinces Eli to reconcile with Val and he is surprised to learn that she and Julie have also called a truce. Julie then gifts Eli with the Martin House, which belonged to his great-grandfather and plans a welcome home party for everyone from the island. During the party, Eli comforts Lani after she witnesses a close moment between JJ and Gabi. They wake up together and learn that Deimos drugged the party guests and he has been murdered. Later, Eli and Lani arrest Gabi's brother Dario (Jordi Vilasuso) for hacking Countess Wilhelmina Cosmetics and running a counterfeit operation. However, they make enemies with Police Commissioner Lou Raines (Aaron D. Spears) when they shut him out of the case. Dario convinces Eli to grant him immunity and place him into the Witness Protection Program in exchange for giving up his partner. Eli's plan backfires when Dario disappears after a failed attempt on his life that lands Abigail in the hospital and Eli tells his aunt Hope Brady (Kristian Alfonso) that Dario's partner is responsible for Abby's accident. Eli blindsides everyone including Lani and Valerie when he has Abe arrested for conspiring with Dario. Julie even threatens to take back the Martin House if Eli doesn't get Abe released. While Eli tries to keep his loved ones at bay, it is revealed that he and Abe are working together to bring down Dario's real accomplice, Commissioner Raines. Raines later kidnaps Gabi forcing Eli, Hope and Gabi's brother Rafe Hernandez (Galen Gering) to come to her rescue. Eli takes a risky shot to save Gabi and Raines is arrested. As Eli and Gabi rekindle their romance against Rafe's wishes, Eli gets fired for his actions. Fortunately, Abe recommends him to the Salem PD. Meanwhile, Eli is confronted by Sheila Watkins, an estranged friend from his past, whom he was responsible for sending to prison. Riddled with guilt, Eli agrees to help Sheila get out of town. Eli comforts Lani when her brother Theo (Kyler Pettis) gets shot in a confrontation with her cop boyfriend JJ. When Abe ask for his personal opinion, Eli reluctantly admits that he believes JJ could've handled the situation better. Gabi is irate at Eli for painting JJ as some trigger happy cop and he accuses Gabi of still pining for him. Eli admits that he is afraid to lose Gabi and they are more determined than ever to make their relationship work. After Gabi stands Eli up at the Horton Christmas party, Eli comforts a distraught Lani who reveals that she walked in on JJ and Gabi in bed.

Eli is later horrified to learn Gabi kept JJ from committing suicide. He and Lani agree to put their mistake behind them but Lani tells him she's pregnant. Lani convinces him to let her raise the baby with JJ as they are engaged to be married. When Eli sees Rafe and Hope's marriage implode due to infidelity, a guilt riddled Eli tells Gabi about the affair, but lies about the baby. When Gabi is put on trial for the murder of André DiMera (Thaao Penghlis), Lani and Eli's affair is exposed when she takes the witness stand. Upon discovering that Eli lied about the baby, Gabi dumps him. Lani initially tries to cut Eli out of the baby's life as it reminds her of the mistakes they've made. When Lani is diagnosed with Placenta praevia, Eli promises to support her and the baby. In June 2018, Eli is devastated when Lani goes into premature labor and the baby is stillborn. Through their grief, Eli and he falls for her. When Lani delivers their son's death certificate, a distraught Eli kisses her only to be rejected. However, by December 2018, Sheila's meddling forces Lani to admit her feelings for Eli and they start dating.

In 2019, Eli worries about Lani's infatuation with Jordan Ridgeway's (Chrishell Stause) infant son – David – when Rafe takes him in. Eli's concern grows as Lani starts missing work and spending nights at Rafe's to care for David after Rafe gets shot. When Eli accuses Lani of trying to replace their son and she refuses to hear him out, he breaks up with her. Fortunately they reconcile when Rafe helps Lani see that her attachment to is due to grief. Eli are engaged on July 4, 2019, and they even discuss having more children. Julie suffers a heart attack and needs a transplant and everyone blames Gabi who leaves her for dead. Later, Lani accidentally shoots Gabi's husband Stefan DiMera (Brandon Barash) leaving him braindead forcing Eli and Lani to turn to Gabi to donate Stefan's heart to save Julie. Gabi ultimately agrees and Eli wants to hold off on the wedding until after Julie recovers but she convinces the couple to move forward. However, Eli is blindsided when Lani suddenly leaves him at the altar. A year later, Eli is dating Gabi and working security at DiMera Enterprises when Gabi sends Eli to track down her sister-in-law Kristen DiMera (Stacy Haiduk) in Europe. He finds Kristen living as a nun in Europe but also finds Lani, also ready to take her vows.

Their reunion sends Eli reeling and he impulsively proposes to Gabi upon his return. As Eli and Gabi are set to marry in February 2020, Lani crashes the wedding to expose that Gabi rigged Julie's pacemaker to stop her heart unless Lani left Eli at the altar. A scorned Gabi tries to kill Julie but JJ has already arranged for Julie to receive a new pacemaker. As Gabi is arrested for incriminating herself, Lani professes her love for Eli struggles to process this revelation. While they soon reunite, the couple are at odds when Lani helps Kristen escape police custody. Eli is forced to look the other way and does not arrest Lani. When Eli and Lani get engaged, as they plan for the wedding, Lani realizes she is pregnant. Though she initially questions whether she wants to keep the baby or not, the couple ultimately decide to go through with the pregnancy. Despite multiple interruptions, Eli and Lani are finally married in July 2020 surrounded by their closest relatives. Eli is upset to learn that Lani is helping Kristen who has snuck back into town. He in turn arrest Kristen leaving Lani furious. Soon district attorney Melinda Trask (Tina Huang) threatens to prosecute the heavily pregnant Lani for aiding and abetting unless Eli can get Kristen to confess. A reluctant Eli successfully records Kristen's confession. Instead of taking it to Melinda, Eli goes to Kristen and convinces her to confess before he turns the recording over. But Lani soon uncovers what Eli did and kicks him out of their home. The couple reconcile on Christmas Eve after Julie and her husband Doug (Bill Hayes) intervene. Lani goes into labor during the Horton tree trimming ceremony and on Christmas Day the couple welcomes their twins, Jules and Carver.

== Development ==
=== Creation and casting ===
Photo Effects

I was going out for casting calls, but nothing was really happening. I wasn't booking anything. Finally, I thought, 'Is this for me? Do I really want to keep doing this?' I got discouraged and then I booked an under-five [lines] on DAYS OF OUR LIVES. That got me back to see some light at the end of this tunnel.

— Lamon Archey, Soap Opera Digest (2013)

In July 2016, the series had released a casting call for the role, then called "Levi." The recurring role, which could possibly become regular, was due to begin taping in late August and expected to begin appearing by early 2017. In December 2016, it was announced that Lamon Archey, known to soap viewers for his recurring role as Mason Wilder on The Young and the Restless had been cast in an unidentified role. On December 11, 2016, Archey and co-star Susan Seaforth Hayes revealed that he would play Eli Grant. "I was really looking to get back into a stable job where I could really sink my teeth into a character," the actor said in a statement to Soap Opera Digest. Executive producer Ken Corday said "He's a good addition to the cast." Archey had previously appeared on Days of Our Lives in two "under-five" roles which he says lead to his casting on The Young and the Restless. The roles included "Centerville cop" in 2011 and "New Dad" in 2013.

While Archey had recently appeared in episodes of 2 Broke Girls and Roadies, he craved the stability that came with a soap and he was "super-excited" to win the role of Eli. He wanted a role that he could make his own and Archey also reveled that Eli's story "hits close" to his own experiences. "Out of all the characters DAYS has written for black males, it would be this one that I get." It was "destiny" he declared. Having sharpened his acting skills since his last stint in daytime, "I definitely felt ready" when the role came about. Archey auditioned opposite his co-stars, Camila Banus and Vanessa Williams, and taped his first scenes the day after he got hired. The actor was relieved that most his audition material appeared in his first scripts so memorizing came easy. "It's taken forever!" Archey said of his debut as he had been filming for nearly six months. The actor reflected on his first day: "I was shaking in my boots. I was really nervous." He continued, "Now I'm much more comfortable and much more comfortable with the character. I understand a lot more about Eli, and I'm able to shape him in ways that blend with me."

=== Characterization ===
==== Personality ====
The initial casting call, described the character as a "gorgeous African American male in [his] late 20s." He said to be "everything a woman could want." He was also characterized as "funny, quick-witted, protective" and "intelligent." The character at times may come off "as edgy not angry." Upon his introduction in 2017, Eli was billed as a "hero". Kelli Larson said while "he's a stand-up guy, Eli is also "someone who loves hard, is hard headed and has a hard time letting go of a grudge." In addition, "honesty is a hot-button topic" for Eli. Eli is "both compassionate and a gentleman" Larson observed.

When the character was announced in 2016, Archey described Eli "very strong" to Soap Opera Digest. In 2017, he called Eli a "confident guy. According to Archey, "He's a good guy." Eli is the kind of person that "definitely knows what he wants in life." According to the actor, Eli has a strong sense of "morals" because he was raised "right." The actor also described Eli as a "mamma's boy." Archey further stated that Eli is "as nice as he appears to be" but he is also very "headstrong." Eli is not some "pushover." Overall, Eli is "pretty straight and narrow." Similar to Archey, in tough situations, Eli prefers to deal with them internally or with those closest to him, as opposed to involving his large extended family. In a 2018 interview, Archey said Eli is "just good people." Even if it's to his own detriment, "if [Eli] loves and cares about you, then he'll do anything for you." "He's an educated black man" Archey said of the character in 2018 and "I've taken it upon myself to show a little more... blackness from him, if I can say."

==== Lineage and backstory ====
It was reported that the character in the casting call was Valerie's son. Some questioned if Abe Carver was his father, as Abe and Valerie dated until Valerie was written out in 1982. However, multiple publications reported that David Banning fathered Valerie's son, making him a Horton. Hope Campbell questioned the validity of the rumor considering Valerie and David had been apart for several years when the characters were written out in the early 1980s. Campbell assumed that David and Valerie had rekindled their romance off screen. Daytime Confidential's Jamey Giddens agreed that an off-screen reunion would be the only way the character's existence would make sense. Eli's paternity makes him the product of soaps' very first interracial pairing. He is also the first Black character with a blood connection to Hortons. Through David, Eli is also descended from the wealthy Martin family, the characters at the center of the first major death and murder plots within the series. As a Horton, Eli is related to majority of the canvas including iconic legacy characters, such as his great-aunt Hope Williams and his cousin Jennifer Horton.

David and Valerie reunite when he visits her in Washington, D.C. but the relationship was still rocky and David would come in and out of her life often. Their final attempt at building a life together culminates in Valerie's pregnancy. Valerie's best friend and neighbor, a police officer named Terence, learns she is pregnant and offers to raise Eli as his own. However, Terence is later killed in the line of duty. Eli is six years old at the time and Val continues raising him on her own. For the most part, it was just Eli and his mom – and Terence up until his death. There isn't any extended family, specifically grandparents, for Eli to interact with. Eli longs to have a "father figure." He is "hurt" that he had to experience all the usual father-son things without a father, like sports. Due to Val's demanding career, she hires a nanny, Dana, to assist with caring for Eli. With his mother always working, Eli spends a lot of time on his own and describes himself as latchkey kid. Eli "has a very strong bond with his mother" Archey commented to in 2016. Growing up, he even confides in her about the girls he likes, unlike most boys his age. As a teenager, he befriends Russell Watkins, and his sister Sheila. They are the best of friends and often get in trouble for petty crimes such as shop lifting and vandalism. Their behavior leads to Eli getting in trouble with the police and Valerie orders Eli to stay away from his friends. When Eli and Valerie are about to move, Eli discovers that Sheila and Russell have started selling drugs. As a rookie in the FBI, Eli goes undercover to investigate a drug kingpin in Chicago and runs into his old friends. Using their friendship, Eli bust up the drug ring sending Russell and Sheila to prison, where Russell dies.

=== Introduction (2017) ===
Archey on Eli's introduction

Within a year, a lot has happened with Eli, meeting a whole new family that he never knew that he had. Also, gaining a lot of relationships with people in the town.

— Lamon Archey, Kontrol (2018)

Once Valerie returns to Salem, the decades-old secret begins to unravel. Throughout late 2016, the writers slowly laid the groundwork for Eli's introduction. As Valerie reconnects with the people of Salem, she runs into Julie which leads to David being mentioned frequently for the first time in decades. When Julie discovers Valerie has a grown son – it puts Val on edge. Corday said Eli's arrival "causes quite a stir." Hayes said the plot revisits David and Valerie's story and allows it "to play out in a natural way." The actress felt the story would "bring up a lot of memories for devoted fans" as it focused on "characters that hadn't even been spoken of in years." By the time he crashes David's funeral, Eli is fully aware of the situation. According to Archey, it doesn't take much for FBI agent Eli to figure out that his mother is hiding something, especially because she has been lying about her whereabouts. "It's a pretty big heartfelt moment" Archey said of Eli's confrontation about her lying. Before he can tell Julie the truth, he has to cope with the news himself. Archey explained, "There's an uncertainty of not knowing if it's ok to go to Julie." He doesn't know how she will react.

Eli ultimately forces Valerie to tell Julie the truth because knows "It needs to come out." Eli puts his mom "on the spot" and forces her hand. While Eli is not prepared for Julie's reaction, he "sympathizes with her." Because they both have lost David and are learning this "huge" secret, it allows them to bond. Archey viewed the revelation of Eli's paternity as the "brighter side" to losing David. For Eli, connecting with Julie means getting "something he didn't have" before. Despite the truth coming out, Eli is still "uneasy" because he doesn't know what comes next. Janet Di Lauro said the scenes are "pivotal" for the character of Eli and for Archey as the actor. The plot hits very close to home for Archey. It mirrors Archey's personal experiences because he only met his own father three times before he died. "I flew out to attend his funeral and kind of went through the same thing that Eli did" Archey told Soap Opera Digest. He continued, "Trust me, when I was reading the script, it was shocking... I was able to tap back into the experiences I had gone through." Archey said Eli's debut was one of his favorite plots to play out specifically because of how much he could relate to it.

Fortunately for Eli, the Hortons welcome him with open arms. And according to Hayes, "Julie is entranced" by her grandson. And "He really likes Julie too." Hayes later said Julie is "coming in and attempting to make a mark on Eli right away" which makes for a "natural conflict" between Val and Julie. Eli is excited to be welcomed in the family – it feels "official" for him Archey said. "He's very interested in finding out more" about David's side of the family and though it is what he wants, the situation is a bit "overwhelming." In the meantime, Eli still wants nothing to do with his mother.

=== Relationship with Gabi Hernandez (2017–2018) ===
Early reports said that Eli would be romantically linked to Gabi Hernandez. It is later revealed that Eli's cousin Abigail Deveraux orchestrates the pairing to keep Gabi away from her husband – Chad DiMera. At the time, Gabi, Abby and Chad are involved in a slowly developed romantic triangle. Coryon Gray considered Eli to be a convenient departure from the failed triangle. The couple's first big obstacle comes in the form of Julie who vehemently disapproves. Hayes said "This woman is a murderess, and Eli is [an] FBI officer. I mean, come on!" A confrontation between the women even lands Julie in the hospital and "Eli is in the middle of this, really not knowing anybody very well." Despite warnings from his new family, Eli is not phased by Gabi's past. "He's got no problem with it" Archey remarked. However, Eli keeps the information in the back of his mind just in case. Eli believes that he can help Gabi get over Chad. Eli is "there as a friend" for Gabi when Chad reunites with Abigail. As opposed to making her "bitter," Carlivati viewed the budding romance with Eli as part of Gabi's "fight to maintain her dignity and take the high road." Eli is attracted to the "sweet girl" that Gabi is and because she is hurting, there is an element of protectiveness on Eli's part. But Eli is determined to take his relationship with Gabi slowly. According to Archey, Eli is attracted to every part of Gabi. "From the first time they met, he was very intrigued by her." Archey praised his co-star Banus for being "very bubbly" and "easy to work with." He continued, "She knows what she's doing and makes the job easier for me."

Meanwhile, Eli bonds with Lani. Eli ultimately cheats on Gabi with Lani who incorrectly believes Gabi is sleeping with Lani's estranged lover, JJ Deveraux. Archey said Eli views their tryst as a "mistake" that occurs "out of anger in the moment." Eli witnesses "how much hurt infidelity can cause" and comes clean. Eli does not "want Gabi to find out from anyone else but him, and he is just tired of stringing her along." While upset, Gabi "understands that Eli was misinformed" and forgives him. But Eli "makes a very bad decision" when he lies about fathering Lani's unborn child as he feels it would "too much" for Gabi to accept. However, the lie eventually leads to the demise of their relationship. When his attempts to help her out of prison and also win her back are met with rejection, Eli gets to the point where he feels "that there was nothing else he could do." When asked about the two potentially reuniting, Archey said they had been through too much. "The wounds are still fresh. [...] I don't see them rekindling anytime soon."

=== Baby David (2018) ===
Lani reluctantly tells Eli she is carrying his child in February 2018. The mere thought of being a father is "extremely important to Eli." Because of Eli's own history, Archey felt it'd be important for Eli to be a part of his own child's life every step of the way. Once the secret is exposed, it becomes "second nature" and Eli "dives in quickly." Archey saw it as the character's attempt to "make up for [the] time that he wasn't involved in the pregnancy and the things that he's missed with her." The high risk pregnancy leaves Eli "frightened, as any new parent would be."

Initially, Archey "wasn't sure where they were going to take [the story]." Throughout filming, Archey and Stowers would confer with each other to see if either had any information about where the pregnancy was going. "There was a time where we were under the assumption that [Lani] would go full term and have the baby. Then we would hear whispers that it might not happen." The actors were ultimately informed of the decision to kill off the baby about two weeks before filming the scenes. Archey assumed the decision had to with the character of Abigail also being pregnant at the time. "Personally, I think it would have been too much to have two characters dealing with a new baby on the show." When Lani goes into premature labor, Eli is concerned but "he's got to be strong for Lani and have a positive mindset about it." He does have a little bit of hope due to Doctor Kayla Brady's (Mary Beth Evans) positive prognosis. Eli is "thrown off" when the Hortons offer their support. According to Archey, because Eli is not accustomed to dealing with a big family, all the extra support is "very foreign to him." When the baby ultimately dies, Eli is "shocked and caught off-guard" because he has already decided "in his mind that everything would turn out okay." As the baby's father and because "they've been trying to go through this process together," Eli insist on breaking the news to Lani.

At first, the baby does not even seem real to Eli. "When they first talked about that, Lani wasn't even showing. There was nothing in front of him that said 'I'm getting ready to be a dad' except for words." Archey worked with producer Albert Alarr and decided he could not ignore that Eli initially rejected the baby in an effort to save his relationship with Gabi. "I couldn't act like that never happened. I kept that as part of his journey." While Archey himself is a father of 3, the actor admitted he had to "dig a little deeper" in his portrayal of Eli's grief because unlike Eli, Lamon bonded got to bond with his children after birth. "I didn't have that connection right away." While he did not get to work with the baby that appeared in Lani's dream sequences, Archey said that just seeing the child helped him connect to the material. "When I saw that baby I almost started crying myself. There’s so much going on in that span of time when we shot those scenes. It brought up emotions for me." Because Sal Stowers was also grieving the loss of her grandmother, Archey "wanted to make sure Sal was okay, just like Eli was with Lani, helping her through the process."

Archey described the filming process which lasted approximately two months, as "a very draining period." He struggled with carrying Eli's grief with him over the course of filming. "I just really wanted to get out of that mind frame – that dark cloud that I was in because it follows you." Fortunately for Archey, he had a vacation to Hawaii planned once the story wrapped. "I remember I was so happy it was over" he stated.

=== Relationship with Lani Price (2018–present) ===
Eli's most significant romance to date is his relationship with Lani Price. However, they start off as friends in 2017. Coryon Gray said "Eli seems to understand Lani a lot" and said their interactions put their personalities on display. Gray noted that the writers "are using Eli to help build" Lani up as a character. It also helped that Archey and Stowers were already familiar with each other through modeling. Due to their first romantic encounter being a one-night-stand neither Archey nor Stowers thought it would lead to a relationship. Despite Lani's ill-fated pregnancy, Archey said "I didn't think it was going to go further." Eli and Lani are "so focused on losing the child" that they can't "think about anything past that."

However, Gray said the duo's shared grief over David made way for "interesting and unique drama – more than a regular birth bringing characters together." Eli and Lani "rushed into something, it didn't work out and now they're trying to work through it." Archey himself described their budding romance as "slow burn." Archey was "very, very happy" to work with T-Boz. "It's fun because [Sheila] brings a different side of Eli out that viewers haven't seen, as well." Sheila's presence ultimately forces Eli and Lani to face their feelings for one another. "They have come a long way" Archey said of the couple's romance. Archey felt that Eli and Lani "are right for each other" because in addition to losing David, they both grew up without their fathers. "They have a lot of things to bond over." Stowers credited Archey with bringing out the "lighthearted side" of the couple's relationship by injecting his own personality into Eli.

Their first major obstacle emerges with Lani's "instant attachment" to David Ridgeway. Lani genuinely wants to help, but the situation is "further exacerbated by the fact that his name is David." However, this "drives a wedge between Eli and Lani" as she moves in with Rafe after he gets shot to assist with David. Eli even appeals to Lani to come home as he "misses spending time" with her. However, according to Sal Stowers, "She keeps blowing him off to stay and be with David, and it kind of puts them in a very weird, awkward place." Eli feels like Lani is "projecting the loss of their David onto this baby David." Stowers admitted that while "[Lani] knew what Eli was saying [...] was true, but she didn't want to hear it." When Lani is hesitant to leave David even after Rafe is healed, Eli breaks up with her. It is only when she kisses Rafe that he helps Lani realize just how deep in "denial" she is. Stowers said Lani has to walk away from David not only for herself, "but also to save her relationship with Eli." Eli and Lani reunite and Stowers believed they "become stronger" after working from this. The reconciliation goes so well that they get engaged.

However, the impending nuptials are threatened when Julie suffers a heart attack. Despite Julie insisting that they carry on without her, Carlivati said "there's a bigger incident that threatens to overshadow their wedding that happens while Lani is on duty." The reconciliation goes so well that the couple gets engaged. When Lani unintentionally shoots Stefan leaving him braindead, Lani – and Eli – have to appeal to Gabi to donate Stefan's heart to save Julie's life. Lamon Archey said "Eli knows there's no way these two women are going to come to terms." Instead, Eli takes it upon himself and reaches out to Gabi based on their past relationship. "He has a connection with [Gabi]" Archey stated. However, Eli's hope is "crushed" when Gabi rejects the idea leaving Julie to die. For Eli it'd be a "huge loss" to lose Julie so soon after she came into his life. Eli is relieved when Gabi donates Stefan's heart to Julie, only for Eli to be blindsided when suddenly Lani dumps him at the altar, claiming she doesn't love him anymore. While he knows she's lying, "It's jolting to hear" Archey said of Lani's declaration. Sal Stowers admitted it was hard for her to accept not having Archey as her main screen partner anymore. "Lamon and I have spent a lot of time growing our friendship and growing the connection of [Eli and Lani] together." Eli and Lani have been separated for a year when he finds her living as a nun in Europe. The meeting "brings up a lot of emotions and bottled-up feelings... He's definitely not in a happy place regarding her. There's a lot of anger there." Eli goes so far as to tell Lani that he is now sleeping with Gabi. According to Archey, "to see if he gets a rise out of [Lani]." And Eli is "a little happy" when Lani's reaction shows she still cares for him. Archey explained that Eli has "been pissed off for a whole year. He's never gotten over what she's done to him and he's really bitter. He wants Lani to feel some of the pain that he went through."

As Eli is set to marry Gabi, Lani, JJ and Julie expose Gabi for rigging Julie's pacemaker to kill her unless Lani left Eli at the altar. In an interview with Soap Opera Digest, Susan Seaforth Hayes explained "The person [Julie] thought was a villain, Lani, is actually a heroine." Though Eli knows the truth now and Lani professes her love for him, "he needs time alone to process things." According to Hayes, while it is a "relief [...] you can't move forward too fast emotionally." Eli and Julie both feel like they've "been hit by a car."

In the summer of 2020, the series borrowed from the 1994 British romantic comedy Four Weddings and a Funeral, and Eli and Lani are one of four couples to get married. While looking for a wedding date that doesn't conflict with the other impending nuptials, Lani realizes she is pregnant. "In addition to their wedding, we have the onset of this pregnancy, which is a joyous thing, and yet it comes with a lot of trepidation" due to David Abraham's stillbirth. While Eli is excited, Lani is terrified of potentially losing another child. "So that is something they tackle together and come to a decision about whether or not to continue with this pregnancy." The characters also mark a historic milestone for the series as they are first African-American couple to marry onscreen in the show's 54-year history.

Soon Eli must contend with the fact that he covered for Lani when she helped Kristen escape police custody in May 2020. When Kristen sneaks back into Salem, Eli chooses to arrest her pitting him at odds with Lani again. Lani is "furious" with her husband as he used what she told him "in confidence to arrest Kristen behind her back." Then, Eli is put over a barrel when D.A. Trask threatens to send Lani to jail unless he can obtain Kristen's confession. "In Eli's mind, this could've been avoid if Lani had been a law-abiding citizen and acted like the cop that she is." Eli is forced to choose between going behind Lani's back, again, or letting her go to prison. Fortunately, Eli "reels [Kristen] in" and gets Kristen to "incriminate herself" on tape. If or when Lani finds out what Eli did, "it could lead to problems in their marriage" Carlivati said. Additionally, Eli's actions pit him against Kristen's boyfriend Brady Black (Eric Martsolf) "because they’re both going to do what they have to in order to save the women they love."

== Reception ==
=== Casting and portrayal ===
TV Source interview

For nearly two years, Lamon Archey has captivated Days of our Lives fans as Detective Eli Grant. Playing the long-lost son of a controversial interracial supercouple of decades long gone could have been a big burden, but Lamon Archey has carried it with grace, humor and class.

— Coryon Gray, TV Source Magazine (2018)

Daytime Confidential's Jamey Giddens celebrated the casting and said "Days of Our Lives is finally getting a black Horton." TVSource Magazine's Coryon Gray praised the casting as part of the show's consistent efforts to further integrate minority characters into the series. Gray further praised Archey for his "natural" portrayal, his chemistry with Vanessa Williams (Valerie) and said "I must say I've been impressed by him from the beginning of his stint in Salem." Gray said the Eli provides a "good balancing dose of heart." He continued that "There is this spark in the actor and character that just makes him pop on screen, no matter who his scene partner may be at the time."

Gray said he was "stunned" when Eli "schooled" Gabi on racial bias in the police force. On their podcast, TVSource Magazine said "Eli Grant always keeps it 100%. We want to see more of him." Gray further stated that "It feels like Eli’s been on much longer [...] because of how well he fits into the show." In 2018 Soapcentral.com said "Lamon Archey is amazing." In 2020, Tony S. of Soapcentral.com said "I don't praise him enough, but I adore Lamon Archey. His delivery always either cracks me up or prompts me to cheer Eli on." Michael Maloney hailed Archey's portrayal during the stillbirth of Eli's son as Emmy worthy.

=== Introduction ===
Missing Pieces

At the very least, the set up to introduce Eli would have been better had David and Scotty made their way to the canvas.

— Steve N, Soap Opera Digest

The writing for the character's introduction received a very mixed reaction. Of Eli's debut scenes in which he announces his paternity – though David had been off screen and gone unmentioned for decades – Carolyn Hinsey from Soap Opera Digest said "A stranger talking to the coffin of another stranger? That's not a soap opera." Laurisa from Soap Central also appreciated that Eli made the show more diverse, but felt the plot was way too independent of existing storylines for a character that viewers weren't familiar with. TV Fanatic's Christine Orlando praised the show for revisiting the David and Valerie's story – which was controversial for the time. Jack Ori felt killing off David solely to facilitate Eli's introduction was "unnecessary" and felt hollow because viewers had only just met Eli. Ori was also disappointed that the writers didn't incorporate flashbacks. Laurisa from Soap Central and Coryon Gray both agreed that Eli's introduction was very rushed – which Gray argued took away from the "emotional impact." Meanwhile, Laurisa said "I'm hard-pressed to think of another character who ever went through that much storyline so fast." Though Gray appreciated Eli and Julie's "beautiful" embrace of one another, he felt it was "anticlimactic" and "unrealistic" for two people who had just met. On the other hand, Soap Opera Digest was ecstatic that the plot put the veteran Hayes back in the forefront and also reunited the remaining members of the Horton family. The magazine also praised Archey for his portrayal. "Credit is also due to Lamon Archey, whose soulful portrayal of Eli, a young man whose whole world has been turned upside down by news of his true paternity, has already impressed." Laurisa continued that she felt "emotionally indifferent" because she did not know Eli. "The whole thing feels mishandled" she stated. Laurisa credited the scenes in which Eli is introduced to his extended family members with making her like the character. "Never underestimate the power of a group scene" she stated. TV Fanatic and Jack Ori also praised the scenes. Soap Opera Digest also celebrated the scenes as "the 'perfect getting to know you' beat that is so often skipped in today's storytelling" and praised Archey for the "ease" he brought to the scenes – "the dynamic wasn't forced." Coryon Gray noted that viewers "were pretty happy to see Eli" when the character was introduced which doesn't always happen with new characters.
