= Valerie Grant =

- Days of Our Lives character
- Vanessa Williams as Valerie Grant
- Portrayed by: Tina Andrews (1975–1977); Rose Fonseca (1977–1978); Diane Sommerfield (1981–1982); Vanessa A. Williams (2016–2022)
- Duration: 1975–1978; 1981–1982; 2016–2022
- First appearance: October 27, 1975
- Last appearance: March 17, 2022
- Created by: Pat Falken Smith
- Introduced by: Betty Corday (1975); Betty Corday and Al Rabin (1981); Ken Corday, Albert Alarr and Greg Meng (2016)
In-universe information
- Occupation: Cardiologist
- Parents: Paul Grant; Helen Grant
- Brothers: Danny Grant
- Sons: Eli Grant
- Grandsons: David Grant; Carver Grant
- Granddaughters: Jules Grant

Valerie Grant is a fictional character from Days of Our Lives, an American soap opera on the NBC network. The character was created by Pat Falken Smith and introduced as the black love interest for white character David Banning. The role was originated by Tina Andrews on October 27, 1975. Andrews was replaced by Rose Fonseca in the summer of 1977. Valerie and her family take David in when he is injured in a car accident and they soon fall in love. David and Valerie become engaged in the summer of 1976 but the romance is plagued by his infidelity, his ex-girlfriend Brooke Hamilton and her mother Helen's unwillingness to accept the relationship. When David's affair with Trish Clayton results in pregnancy, Valerie ends the relationship and takes a scholarship to medical school at Howard University in 1978. Actress Diane Sommerfield took over the role in 1981 when Valerie returns as a medical intern at the hospital. She becomes involved with Abe Carver which is plagued by Val's residual feelings for David and Abe's unwillingness to get married one day. The character is written out in 1982.

In 2016, after a nearly 35-year absence, the character was reintroduced with veteran actress Vanessa A. Williams in the role, when cardiologist Valerie is enlisted to help save Abe Carver. Valerie rekindles her romance with Abe despite disapproval from his teenage son Theo Carver. In 2017, after David's sudden death, it is revealed that Valerie had secretly given birth to his son — Eli Grant. Valerie's romance with David is recognized as the first interracial love story in daytime television history. The refusal of certain viewers to accept the relationship would make Valerie one of the most controversial characters in the history of Days of Our Lives.

== Storylines ==
=== 1975–1978 ===
(Left to right): Richard Guthrie and Tina Andrews as David and Valerie on the cover of Jet on August 18, 1977.

In October 1975, Valerie (Tina Andrews), a young nurse, is shocked when her brother Danny (Michael Dwight Smith) brings home a mysterious stranger after a car accident. Val examines him and realizes he is severely dehydrated. When he awakens, the stranger introduces himself as David Smith (Richard Guthrie) and they their parents agree to let him stay. When David begins drinking heavily, Val's mother Helen (Ketty Lester) wants to put him out but her father Paul (Lawrence Cook) refuses to abandon David. The Grants are shocked when David confesses that he is actually the presumed dead David Banning and he is hiding from his family and swears them to secrecy. Val informs David that he has been calling out the name "Brooke" in his sleep but David claims the name isn't special. Brooke (Adrienne LaRussa) turns out to be David's girlfriend, who comes looking for him and Val initially denies that David is living there until Brooke accuses her of wanting money. David is furious that Brooke has found him and Paul confesses to telling the Horton family of his whereabouts. Val warns David that Brooke is trouble and David later dumps her. David reconciles with his grieving mother Julie Anderson (Susan Seaforth Hayes) who has just miscarried her baby but still rejects Brooke, and Brooke in turn berates Val about her budding relationship with David leaving her in tears. Val later helps David and his great-grandmother Alice Horton (Frances Reid) pack up Julie's nursery. David and Val make plans to go dancing upsetting Helen and Danny who fear they are getting too close. Brooke ruins their outing and harasses Val in public forcing Danny to come to her rescue while David deals with a jealous Brooke. David and Val finish their rendezvous at the Grants' home and Paul is suspicious when he finds them together, though David and Val claim they are just friends. The family later celebrates when Paul gets a job at Anderson Manufacturing but Paul isn't too happy and reveals that Brooke claims she is pregnant. Val is horrified when David announces plans to marry Brooke—though he doesn't love her. However, Val is shocked when Brooke makes plans to have an abortion and accuses David of skipping out on his responsibilities. David explains that he did not know about Brooke's decision but fears he is too late to stop her. Brooke confronts David and Val at church, and refuses to marry him realizing he is in love with Valerie, but makes him promise to care for their child. In late March 1976, David and Val celebrate his new job at Anderson Manufacturing working under her father. Throughout the spring, David and Valerie struggle to admit their feelings for one another which leads to constant bickering. In late August 1976, Val is stunned when David professes his love for her and proposes marriage. Though she loves him too, Val is reluctant to accept the proposal fearing her family's reaction. While Paul isn't happy, he will accept it if it makes Val happy but Helen is adamantly against the interracial marriage and Julie isn't too keen on the idea either. Meanwhile, the Grant family is turned upside down when Paul and David are accused of stealing money from Anderson Manufacturing. Val comforts a concerned Helen after Paul nearly falls off the wagon and believes the stress of her impending nuptials to David has driven her dad over the edge. On October 4, 1976, Val accepts David's proposal despite her reservations but with David now out of a job, their plans are stalled and Val is willing to wait until they can afford it. Still upset over Paul's recent firing, Helen is not happy about Val and David's news. Val and David agree that he should move out until after the wedding. Val is shocked when Helen reveals that she found David at Brooke's apartment. While Val buys David's story that he was just comforting a grief-stricken Brooke after her mother's funeral, Val knows Helen won't accept the explanation. A reluctant Val temporarily calls off the engagement afraid of the trouble it has caused her family. In actuality, Val has some doubts about David and Brooke. Helen gives her daughter an ultimatum, she must choose between David and their family. A confident David encourages her to make a choice but is shocked when Val chooses her family. However, she soon changes her mind only to find him after a drunken one-night-stand. Though she is hurt, Val forgives David and the engagement is back on. Tired of her parents' opinions about her romantic life, Val moves into her own place just before the holidays. In April 1977, Val is shocked when she receives a full scholarship to Howard University's College of Medicine. Though she is reluctant to tell him, David is willing to drop everything to be with her. In May 1977, despite further protest from Julie who fears David is sacrificing way too much, David and Val travel to Washington, D.C. to look for an apartment. But upon their return, Brooke blindsides Val with the news that Trish Clayton (Patty Weaver) is pregnant with David's child. A distraught Val calls off the wedding and runs away to D.C. Val (Rose Fonseca) returns to Salem in August 1977 hoping to reunite with David but leaves town immediately when she realizes he is too preoccupied with the pregnant Trish. Val visits for the holidays in December 1977 and she and David are quite upset to realize that they've missed yet another chance to be together. Val returns in July 1978 after Paul suffers a fatal heart attack at work. David comforts Val and they reminisce about their past before she returns to Washington.

=== 1981–1982 ===
Valerie (Diane Sommerfield) returns to town in November 1981 and strikes up a romance with Police sergeant Abe Carver (James Reynolds). Val also lands a job as a medical intern at Salem University Hospital. Val is furious when she discovers Danny is harboring a fugitive David (Gregg Marx) who has been shot. Meanwhile, Danny disapproves of Abe and Val's budding romance. David leaves before Danny can be implicated in his disappearance and Abe puts distance between himself and Val. At work, Val faces off with her former mentor Doctor Neil Curtis. Val later confesses to harboring David and gives him an alibi for a murder which clears him as a prime suspect in the Salem Strangler serial killer investigation. Upon learning that David is on the run from the mob, Valerie starts looking into the murders. She and Danny later find David and his son Scotty (Dick Billingsley) hiding in a deserted warehouse. David and Valerie agree to remain friends. In May 1982, Abe and Valerie briefly rekindle their romance. Their reunion is short lived due to Abe revealing that he is not interested in marriage. Valerie leaves town and takes a job offer in New York City.

=== 2016–present ===
Kayla Brady (Mary Beth Evans) brings Valerie (Vanessa A. Williams) back to Salem to oversee Abe's medical treatment. Abe's teenage son Theo (Kyler Pettis) struggles to trust Valerie when he watches Abe nearly die. Valerie quickly realizes that Abe has been neglecting his health and is forced to operate again. Abe pulls through and wants to rekindle their romance. Meanwhile, Theo accuses Valerie of lying to Abe and she claims to have lied to her boss about attending a medical convention in New York. Valerie and Abe bond over raising children as single parents and Theo starts to let his guard down with Valerie when Abe invites her to spend Christmas with them. In early 2017, Valerie is irate to discover a recording device in her purse and confronts Theo who admits to spying on her. Theo apologizes and Valerie agrees to keep the incident from Abe. Val later advises Theo and his girlfriend Claire Brady (Olivia Rose Keegan) on how to deal with reactions to their interracial romance. As Valerie is about to leave town, she is devastated by the news of David's sudden death. Val is shocked when her son Eli Grant (Lamon Archey) crashes David's funeral and confronts her with truth about David being his father. Valerie tries to reconcile with Eli who avoids her until she confronts him and he forces her to tell Julie that he is David's son. Faced with rejection from her son, Val finds comfort with Abe.

== Development ==
=== Casting and creation ===
Williams on her interview

We talked about the character, what soap opera mean to our culture and my own personal life. My grandmother watched the CBS soaps, [such as] THE YOUNG AND THE RESTLESS. Of course, I knew about DAYS. It was fascinating to hear about Valerie's history and the reaction to her relationship with David Banning in the 1970s. At that time, people just were not ready to see a white man and a black woman together. A few days later, they called and said, 'C'mon down!'

— Vanessa A. Williams, Soap Opera Digest

The role of Valerie was originated by actress Tina Andrews in 1975 on a recurring basis. In the summer of 1977, it was announced that Andrews would vacate the role of Valerie after two years to join the cast of the network's prime-time sitcom, Sanford Arms. On her departure from the role of Valerie, Andrews remarked "It's like having your child grow up and leave home. You know it's for the best but hard to accept." In addition to collecting a regular salary, Andrews appreciated the advantages of working on the soap. "It was like a paid workshop. I kept my skills sharp." Because she was not bound by a contract, "I can take another job whenever I want. I was just sure to give the show time enough to write my character out of the story for that time. Andrews and the producers were working on an arrangement for her to continue taping when she was available, but plans changed when the actress booked several television films. Andrews last appeared in the role of Valerie on July 22 and was replaced by Rose Fonseca on August 2; Fonseca was also on a recurring basis. Fonseca vacated the role in 1978, and last appeared on July 26. Actress Diane Sommerfield took over the role of Valerie on October 19, 1981, as a series regular. However, Sommerfield's tenure barely lasted a year and she last appeared on July 1, 1982.

In April 2016, following the announcement that the series had once again replaced their head writers, a casting call was released for the character of Valerie. The producers were looking for an experienced actress to step into the role by late May 2016. In October 2016, several media outlets reported that former Melrose Place actress Vanessa A. Williams had been cast in the role of Valerie; she made her first appearance on October 25. In an interview with Soap Opera Digest, Williams revealed that she'd auditioned for the show several times -- but "guest-star and recurring roles." And when the casting call for the role of Valerie went out, "Marnie [Saitta, casting director] already knew my work" the actress said. "I think there was enough tape on me that it was basically an interview." From there, Williams went straight to work. "Oh my God, it was trial by fire," Williams exclaimed. She had not worked on a soap since she had a bit role on Another World in New York. "It was so different than how we do it." She continued, "It reminded me of working in theater" as there was very little time to rehearse.

=== Early storylines ===
Valerie was created as the Black love interest for Richard Guthrie's David Banning in 1975. To help with the writing for "America's first and foremost Daytime TV interracial romance," the producers recruited Black script writer, Wanda Coleman to help pen the story. The romance developed "oh so slowly" with the duo barely ever touching until their first kiss in 1976. Actress Tina Andrews, who originated the role of Valerie, relished in challenging the "taboo" and "reflecting life as it really is." Despite viewer backhlash, Andrews pushed for David and Valerie's eventual marriage and hoped the two would start a family. She insisted, "if you are doing a soap and want to be slightly scandalous then do it right." When David proposes to Valerie in the summer of 1976, Valerie wants to take time to consider it. In actuality, the writers believed they could wait for viewers to come around. As of the summer of 1977, Valerie and David were engaged and Andrews believed the two would eventually marry. But when fan response did not change, the writers chose to end the romance. Andrews was very upset when she was informed of the storyline decision. In story, David cheats on Valerie with Trish Clayton, and she breaks it off with him upon learning that Trish is pregnant. David marries Trish and Valerie is written out having received a scholarship to Howard University's College of Medicine. Andrews, at the time was in negotiations with the producers to get Valerie back on canvas when she booked Sanford which led to the recast.

When Pat Falken Smith was rehired as head writer in 1981, one of the first moves was to bring Valerie back to the canvas with Diane Sommerfield in the role. However, David (Gregg Marx) and Valerie's romance was not revisited. The two remain friends even when she helps him hide from the law. Instead, Valerie becomes involved with Detective Abe Carver (James Reynolds). Their romance is plagued by Valerie's maintained friendship with David and the danger Abe faces in his work.

=== Return (2016) ===
It was reported that Valerie, now a respected cardiologist, would return to tend to her former flame, Abe Carver, who had recently been shot. In addition, Valerie's return puts her in story with Abe's teenage son, Theo (Kyler Pettis). The actress also had to learn medical terminology and credits co-star Evans, who plays Kayla Brady, with helping Williams step into the doctor role. Williams said: "It will be very intriguing to see [Valerie] interacting with Abe." According to Williams, "Valerie's a professional. She's sharp and knows her stuff, but at same time, she also has a little mystery to her."

In the summer of 2016, the series released a casting call for the recurring role of the African-American Levi. In December 2016, reports surfaced with claims that the character of Levi would be Valerie's son which led to speculation that David was the man's father, making him a member of show's core family, the Hortons. Meanwhile, it was announced the Lamon Archey had joined the cast in an unnamed role and was slated to debut in early 2017. On December 11, 2016, Seaforth Hayes announced Archey's casting in a video interview with the actor and revealed that he would portray Julie's grandson, Eli Grant.

== Reception ==
In 2020, Candace Young and Charlie Mason from Soaps She Knows put Valerie on their list of Daytime's Most Important African-American Characters, commenting that "Andrews made headlines with Richard Guthrie as David Banning in creating what Jet magazine called at the time "TV's Controversial Interracial Couple." Or, as we'd call the pairing now, "Oh, What a Lovely Couple." It was progress, but there was and still is more to be made."
