= List of Days of Our Lives characters introduced in the 1960s =

A list of notable characters from the NBC soap opera Days of Our Lives that significantly impacted storylines and debuted between November 8, 1965, and the end of 1969.

== Tony Merritt ==
Tony Merritt
- Days of Our Lives character
- Portrayed by: Richard A. Colla (1965–66); Don Briscoe (1966); Ron Husmann (1966–67)
- Duration: 1965—67
- First appearance: November 8, 1965
- Last appearance: March 31, 1967
- Created by: Peggy Phillips; Kenneth Rosen
- Introduced by: Ted Corday
In-universe information
- Occupation: Teacher
- Father: Craig Merritt

Tony Merritt is a character from the soap opera Days of Our Lives, portrayed by Richard Colla from 1965 to 1966, Don Briscoe in 1966, and Ron Husmann from 1966 to 1967.

Tony was engaged to Marie Horton but suffered from a blood disease that affected his health and decided to leave the night of their wedding believing she wouldn't want to see him suffer and die. When he returned to Salem, Marie had married his father, Craig. He tried to move on and accept Marie's choice. Eventually, he told his father the truth on why he called his wedding and Craig stepped aside to let Marie and Tony have a second chance at love. However, the trust between him and the whole Horton family was gone, so he and Marie ended their relationship and he left Salem later that year.

== Craig Merritt ==
Craig Merritt
- Days of Our Lives character
- Portrayed by: David McLean (1965–67); Harry Lauter (1966)
- Duration: 1965–67
- First appearance: November 9, 1965
- Last appearance: February 14, 1967
- Created by: Peggy Phillips; Kenneth Rosen
- Introduced by: Ted Corday
In-universe information
- Occupation: Airline pilot
- Spouse: Mrs Merritt (backstory); Marie Horton
- Children: Tony Merritt

Craig Merritt is a character from the soap opera Days of Our Lives, portrayed by David McLean from 1965–67, and by Harry Lauter in 1966 temporary.

== Ben Olson ==
Ben Olson
- Days of Our Lives character
- Portrayed by: Robert Knapp
- Duration: 1965
- First appearance: November 10, 1965
- Last appearance: December 13, 1965
- Created by: Peggy Phillips; Kenneth Rosen
- Introduced by: Ted Corday
In-universe information
- Occupation: President of the First National Bank of Salem
- Wife: Addie Horton (until 1971)
- Children: Steve Olson; Julie Olson
- Grandchildren: David Banning; Spencer Olson
- Other relatives: Scotty Banning; Eli Grant

Ben Olson was a character from Days of Our Lives, who was the husband of Addie Horton, and portrayed by Robert Knapp.

His significant storyline was in 1965, when Ben and Addie moved to Paris, leaving their daughter Julie behind, and in the care of Addie's parents, Tom and Alice. In 1971, Ben died offscreen from a heart attack, which prompts Addie to return to Salem.

== Steve Olson ==
Steve Olson
- Days of Our Lives character
- Portrayed by: Flip Mark (1965); James Carroll Jordan (1972); Stephen Schnetzer (1978–2025)
- Duration: 1965; 1972; 1978–1979; 2024–2025
- First appearance: November 10, 1965
- Last appearance: November 14, 2025
- Created by: Peggy Phillips; Kenneth Rosen
- Introduced by: Ted Corday
In-universe information
- Parents: Ben Olson; Addie Horton
- Sisters: Julie Olson Williams
- Half-sisters: Hope Williams Brady
- Children: Spencer Olson
- Grandparents: Tom Horton; Alice Horton
- Aunts and uncles: Tommy Horton; Mickey Horton; Bill Horton; Marie Horton
- Nieces and nephews: David Banning; Robert Anderson Jr. Shawn Douglas Brady; Zack Brady; Ciara Brady
- First cousins: Sandy Horton; Melissa Horton (adoptive); Sarah Horton (legal); Mike Horton; Jennifer Horton; Lucas Roberts; Jessica Blake
- Other relatives: Scotty Banning; Eli Grant; Claire Brady; Bo Weston

Steven Olson is a character from Days of Our Lives and is the older brother of Julie. He was portrayed by Flip Mark (1965), James Carroll Jordan (1972), and then finally Stephen Schnetzer (1978–1979, 2024).

Briefly introduced in 1965, Steve when with parents when they decided to move to Paris, France. After his father died in 1971, Steven remained in Paris to finish his schooling, even though his mother Addie returned to Salem. The following year, he returned to Salem after finishing school, but, when he was unhappy in Salem, he returned to Paris.

In 1978, Steve returned to Salem once more where he took up some jobs in Doug's Coffee House where he skimmed tips, and later Julie's antique store he sold Julie fake antiques. His troubled behavior reached a boiling point when became involved in with a drug smuggler, Durand. After losing diamonds that Durand made him in charge of, Steve fled Salem out of fear, never to be heard from again.

In March 2024, it was announced that Schnetzer would reprise the role of Steve for a number of episodes. Steve returns to Salem in December of the same year to support his sister after Doug's death. After a time capsule revealed a diamond necklace belonging to Alice, as a gift from her daughter Addie, he privately revels how his grandmother kept it from him all those years. He is later wrongly accused by Lucas and Ciara for stealing it when it goes missing. He dismisses their claims and says goodbye to Julie, not telling her of the confrontation. He only mentioned to her not to believe everything she hears about him. He also has a son named Spencer who he reveals to Leo Stark is also gay and was willingly to set a meeting of the two if he wanted. He briefly returns in 2025, for the opening of the Tom Horton Free Clinic thru the hospital.

== David Martin ==
David Martin
- Days of Our Lives character
- Portrayed by: Clive Clerk
- Duration: 1966–67
- First appearance: February 10, 1966
- Last appearance: August 24, 1967
- Created by: Peggy Phillips
- Introduced by: Ted Corday
In-universe information
- Parents: John Martin; Helen Martin
- Spouse: Susan Hunter (1966-1967)
- Children: Richard Martin; David Banning
- Grandchildren: Scotty Banning; Eli Grant
- Other relatives: Jules Grant; Carver Grant

David Martin is a character on the soap opera Days of Our Lives, portrayed by Clive Clerk from 1966-67.

The only child of the affluent John and Helen Martin, he was the former lover of Julie Olson. They had planned to elope until Julie was talked out of it by her grandfather Tom Horton. David eventually ended up marrying Julie's best friend Susan Hunter after discovering she was pregnant with their child. They had originally planned to give the baby up for adoption, but Susan changed her mind when the baby was born, Richard "Dickie" Martin. He wanted to end the marriage but Susan's parents, Richard and Diane, pressured him to stay with Susan.

As his marriage continued to fall apart, and he started seeing Julie again. Things only got worse when Richard fell off his swing set, and died while the two were playing. Delirious with grief, she believed David had intended for the accident to happen as their so was the only thing tying David to her and she shot him, killing him. In the aftermath of the murder, Julie learned she was pregnant with his child, David Martin Jr. Julie gave the baby up for adoption and was adopted by Scott and Janet Banning.

== Susan Martin ==
Susan Martin
- Days of Our Lives character
- Portrayed by: Denise Alexander (1966–73); Bennye Gatteys (1973–76)
- Duration: 1966–76
- First appearance: April 14, 1966
- Last appearance: October 1, 1976
- Created by: Peggy Phillips
- Introduced by: Ted Corday
In-universe information
- Other names: Susan Hunter
- Occupation: Founded the David Martin Clinic
- Parents: Richard Hunter; Diane Hunter
- Spouse: David Martin (1966–67); Greg Peters (1973–76)
- Children: Dickie Martin; Annie Peters

Susan Martin was originated by Denise Alexander from April 14, 1966, to February 6, 1973, when the character was written out of the show temporarily when the casting office hit a snag renewing Alexander's contract and the contract lapsed. ABC Daytime rushed to offer her a then-unheard of salary/perks package to join General Hospital as Lesley Webber. When Susan returned to the show, a new actress, Bennye Gatteys, played her from April 6, 1973, to October 1, 1976.

Susan was an old high school classmate of Julie Olson, her storyline involved the first major death when her son Dickie Martin accidentally died in May 1967, which culminated into the first Days murder, where Susan kills her husband, David Martin.

In 2020, Charlie Mason from Soaps She Knows placed Susan at #20 on a list of the 35 most memorable characters from Days of Our Lives, saying "Wherever Denise Alexander’s troubled heroine went, heartache followed. Over the course of a decade in Salem, she suffered through the deaths of both a marriage and a child, and a totally twisted triangle with the Peters brothers."

== Kitty Horton ==
Kitty Horton
- Days of Our Lives character
- Portrayed by: Regina Gleason
- Duration: 1967–69
- First appearance: August 31, 1967
- Last appearance: November 28, 1969
- Created by: William J. Bell
- Introduced by: Betty Corday
In-universe information
- Occupation: Secretary
- Spouse: Tommy Horton (until 1969)
- Children: Sandy Horton

Kitty Horton was portrayed by Regina Gleason from 1967–69.

Kitty was the wife of Tommy Horton and the mother of their daughter Sandy. Kitty and Tommy were married before Tommy was supposedly killed during the Korean war in 1953. Even after Tommy was revealed to be alive, she still pursued other men which soon led to their divorce. After accidentally recording a conversation between Tom and his daughter-in-law Laura Horton, discussing her son Mike Horton's health problems and parentage, Kitty called Tommy's brother Bill over, using the tape as bait to seduce him. Furious, he struggled with her to get the tape back. After he left, Kitty had a heart attack from the stress and died. After a brief investigation, Bill became the primary suspect in Kitty's death. Refusing to say why he was at the apartment, Bill was sentenced to three years in prison.

== Elliot Kincaid ==
Dr. Elliot Knicaid is a character on the soap opera Days of Our Lives spanning from September 11, 1967 to October 8, 1969 before being written out of the show. He was first portrayed by Phillip Pine in 1967, Charles Macaulay from 1967 to 1968 and finally John Matthews from 1968 to 1969.

A doctor that Salem University Hospital, Elliot was pursued romantically by Kitty Horton until the emergence of long-thought dead husband Tommy. After Tommy discovered the affair, it complicated things even though the couple divorced. Elliot later broke up with Kitty.

== Sandy Horton ==
Sandy Horton
- Days of Our Lives character
- Portrayed by: Astrid Warner (1967); Heather North (1967–72); Martha Smith (1982); Pamela Roylance (1983–84)
- Duration: 1967–72; 1982–84
- First appearance: December 12, 1967
- Last appearance: April 11, 1984
- Created by: William J. Bell
- Introduced by: Betty Corday (1967); Betty Corday and Al Rabin (1982)
In-universe information
- Occupation: Doctor
- Family: Horton
- Parents: Tommy Horton; Kitty Horton
- Grandparents: Tom Horton; Alice Horton
- Aunts and uncles: Addie Horton; Mickey Horton; Bill Horton; Marie Horton
- First cousins: Julie Olson Williams; Steve Olson; Hope Brady; Melissa Horton (adoptive); Sarah Horton (legal); Mike Horton; Jennifer Horton; Lucas Roberts; Jessica Blake

Dr. Sandy Horton is a fictional character on the NBC soap opera Days of Our Lives. She is the daughter of Kitty and Tommy Horton, Jr. and the granddaughter of original characters Alice and Tom Horton.

The role was originated by Astrid Warner who portrayed the role briefly for two episodes on December 12 and 13, 1967, it was around that time the role was recast with actress Heather North, the actress who played Sandy for the longest duration from December 20, 1967, to May 21, 1971, and from December 23, 1971, to June 16, 1972. In 1982, Sandy was reintroduced to the series with actress Martha Smith, who would play the role for four months from August 12 to December 8. Seven months later, the role was recast, this time with Pamela Roylance. Roylance would only last for about seven months, starting on July 18, 1983, and ultimately leaving on April 11, 1984.

== David Banning ==
David Banning
- Days of Our Lives character
- Portrayed by: Chad Barstad (1968–1970); Christian Mann (1968); Jeffrey Williams (1970–1973); Steve Doubet (1975); Richard Guthrie (1975–1980); Gregg Marx (1981–1983)
- Duration: 1968–1973; 1975–1983
- First appearance: June 10, 1968
- Last appearance: November 22, 1983
- Created by: William J. Bell
- Introduced by: Betty Corday
In-universe information
- Other names: David Martin, Jr. (birth name); David Blake; Bradley Banning (adopted); David Smith
- Family: Horton
- Parents: David Martin; Julie Olson
- Adoptive parents: Scott Banning; Janet Banning
- Stepfather: Bob Anderson (1974–1976); Doug Williams (1976–1979, 1981–1986, 1994–2017)
- Half-brothers: Dickie Martin
- Wife: Trish Clayton (1977–81); Renée DuMonde (1982–1983)
- Sons: Scotty Banning; Eli Grant
- Grandsons: David Grant; Carver Grant
- Granddaughters: Jules Grant
- Grandparents: Ben Olson; Addie Horton; John Martin; Helen Martin
- Uncles: Steven Olson
- Aunts: Hope Williams
- First cousins: Spencer Olson; Shawn-Douglas Brady; Zack Brady; Ciara Brady
- Other relatives: Tom Horton; Alice Horton

David Banning, most notably portrayed by Richard Guthrie (1975–1980) and Gregg Marx (1981–1983), is the son of Julie Olson (Susan Seaforth Hayes) and her late lover David Martin.

David Martin, Jr. is born in January 1968 to Julie Olson (Catherine Ferrar) and he is immediately put up for adoption. The child is adopted by Scott Banning (Mike Farrell) and his terminally ill wife Janet (Joyce Easton) as Bradley Banning (Chad Barstad). Susan Martin (Denise Alexander) befriends the Bannings and often helps care for Janet and baby Brad. As Susan comforts Scott after Janet's death in early 1969, Julie (Susan Seaforth Hayes) discovers that Brad is the child she gave up and seduces Scott away from Susan. Though Julie and Scott marry in 1970, by 1971, she's fallen in love with Doug Williams (Bill Hayes) and plans to leave Scott but wants to make sure she can retain custody of David (Jeffrey Williams). As Julie is set to divorce Scott in 1972, she plans to elope with Doug and honeymoon in Portofino and wants to bring David along. However, Doug is not interested in parenthood and he spontaneously marries Julie's mother Addie Olson (Patricia Barry). After Scott's death in early 1973, Julie sends David off to military school.

The 18 year old David (Richard Guthrie) returns in the summer of 1975 with his new girlfriend Brooke Hamilton (Adrienne La Russa). Brooke is jealous of David's growing closeness with his mother Julie and to drive a wedge between them, Brooke spread rumors about Julie being unfaithful to his stepfather Bob Anderson (Mark Tapscott) and potentially being pregnant with Doug's child. David and Julie get into a fight and he runs off and gets into a car accident in which he is presumed dead. David survives and is taken in by the Grants where he befriends the daughter Valerie Grant (Tina Andrews). Meanwhile, Brooke learns she is pregnant with David's baby but refuses to marry him because he is in love with Valerie.

In 2017, it is revealed that David has died in a motorbike accident. It is also revealed that he has another son, Eli Grant, with Valerie.

== Mike Horton ==
Mike Horton
- Days of Our Lives character
- Portrayed by: Kyle Puerner (1968–1969); Wade Holdsworth (1969); Brian Andrews (1970); Bobby Eilbacher (1970); Eddie Rayden (1970); Alan Decker (1970–1971); John Amour (1971–1973); Dick DeCoit (1973); Stuart Lee (1973); Wesley Eure (1974–1981); Paul Coufos (1981–1982); Michael T. Weiss (1985–1990); Roark Critchlow (1994–2025)
- Duration: 1968–1982; 1985–1990; 1994–1999; 2010; 2022; 2025
- First appearance: November 13, 1968
- Last appearance: November 14, 2025
- Created by: William J. Bell
- Introduced by: Betty Corday (1968); Betty Corday and Al Rabin (1985); Ken Corday and Tom Langan (1994); Ken Corday and Gary Tomlin (2010); Ken Corday and Albert Alarr (2022); Ken Corday and Janet Spellman-Drucker (2025)
In-universe information
- Other names: Michael William Horton II
- Occupation: Doctor
- Parents: Bill Horton; Laura Horton
- Stepfather: Mickey Horton
- Sisters: Jennifer Horton
- Half-brothers: Lucas Horton
- Wife: Margo Anderman (1978–1980)
- Sons: Jeremy Horton
- Grandparents: Tom Horton; Alice Horton; James Spencer; Carrie Spencer
- Aunts and uncles: Tommy Horton; Addie Horton; Mickey Horton; Marie Horton
- Nieces and nephews: Abigail Deveraux; Will Horton; JJ Deveraux; Allie Horton
- First cousins: Sandy Horton; Steven Olson; Julie Williams; Hope Williams Brady; Melissa Horton (adoptive); Sarah Horton (legal); Jessica Blake Fallon

Mike Horton is the son of Laura Horton, and was named after Mickey Horton, who was thought to be his father, though his actual father was Bill Horton, Mickey's brother. Mike has the honor of being the most recast character in Days of our Lives history, having been played by sixteen different actors since his character's birth in 1968. He's also been the most constantly aged and de-aged. His most well known (and longest lasting) portrayers were Wesley Eure from June 6, 1974, to January 16, 1981, Michael T. Weiss from August 8, 1985, to March 1, 1990, and Roark Critchlow from April 27, 1994, to November 19, 1999, and June 23 to 28, 2010. In June 2025, it was revealed Critchlow would reprise the role when Mike returns to town.

Mike grew up knowing his father as town lawyer Mickey Horton and was as shocked as Mickey was to learn that his true father is the man he thought was his uncle Bill, who drunkenly raped his mother, Dr. Laura Spencer, while she was married to Mickey. Although Mike has become a bit closer to Bill through the years, he still considers Mickey to be his father.

Mike was married for the first time very young to Margo Anderman and his wife died in the summer of 1980 of leukemia. He left town not long after that happened, but later returned and began a residency at Salem University, while looking after his teenage sister, Jennifer. During this time, he began a relationship with Dr. Robin Jacobs, which was made difficult by their different religions, Robin was devoutly Jewish and Mike was Catholic and she wouldn't allow herself to marry inter-faith. Although Mike wanted to convert in order to make the relationship work, he eventually realized that wouldn't be fair to either of them and Robin left town to live in Israel. Sometime later Mike learned that Robin had given birth to his son, Jeremy. Mike left Salem in 1990 to join Robin and Jeremy and try to make a family.

In 1994, Mike returned to Salem, it having not worked out between him and Robin. He was soon made chief of staff at Salem University Hospital, over rival Craig Wesley. Craig convinces nurse Ali McIntyre to pursue a relationship with Mike to get the head nurse's job, but when she doesn't get the job she sues Mike and the hospital for sexual harassment. During this, he began an affair with Carrie Brady Reed, who worked in Public Relations at the hospital. Eventually Carrie's husband Austin Reed found out, and the two divorced. Mike and Carrie devised a plan to get Ali to admit what she and Craig were planning, but when she figured it out, she drugged and kidnapped Mike. She planned to force him to elope with her, but Roman Brady caught and arrested her. Ali was declared mentally unstable and institutionalized. Mike and Carrie got together officially and left Salem together to return to Israel, as Mike wanted to continue to have a relationship with his son. While off-screen, Mike and Carrie split up and his son Jeremy returned to Salem for a brief period.

Mike returned to Salem in June 2010 when he received news that his grandmother, Alice Horton was extremely ill. Mike returned along with many other family members. While on his way to Alice's, he was involved in a car accident and was injured. He was brought to University Hospital where he was treated. His goal was to get better quickly so he could visit his grandmother one last time. Several days later, he received news from Bill and Jennifer Horton that Alice had died. He reminisced about the wonderful times he shared with Alice. Before leaving Salem, he hung up a plaque in the hospital in honor of his late grandmother.

Mike returned in 2022 where he made amends with Nancy Wesley and took Jennifer to rehab after she relapsed in her painkiller addiction and again in November 2025 for the opening of the Tom Horton Free Clinic.

== See also ==
- List of Days of Our Lives characters
- List of Days of Our Lives characters (1970s)
- List of Days of Our Lives characters (1980s)
- List of Days of Our Lives characters (1990s)
- List of Days of Our Lives characters (2000s)
- List of Days of Our Lives characters (2010s)
- List of Days of Our Lives characters (2020s)
- List of Days of Our Lives cast members
- List of previous Days of Our Lives cast members
