= Lamon Archey =

American actor (born 1981)

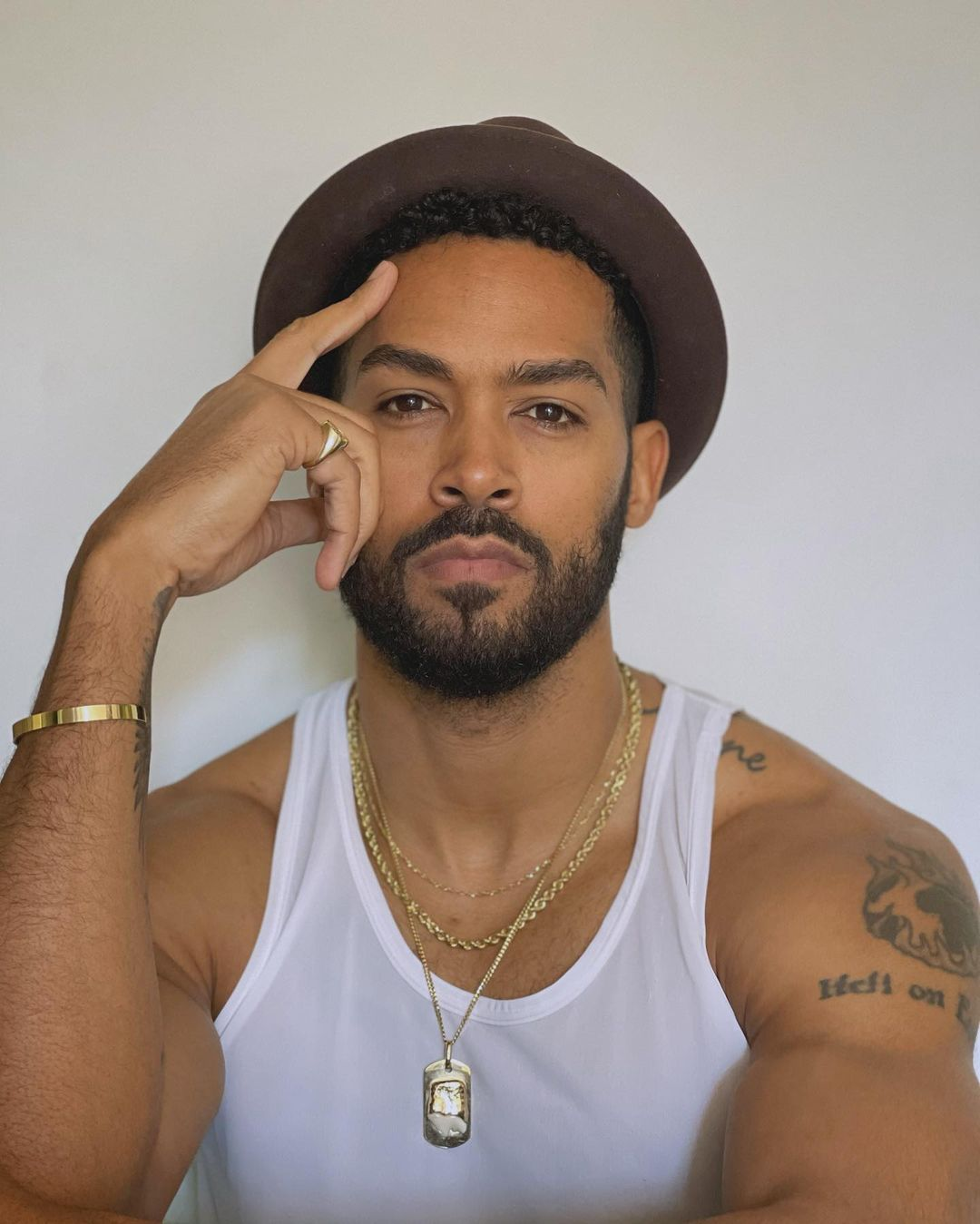
- Archey in 2023
- Born: Lamon Dezjon Archey; April 9, 1981 (age 43); Daly City, California, U.S.
- Occupation: Actor
- Years active: 2010–present

Lamon Dezjon Archey (/lʌmoʊn/; born April 9, 1981) is an American actor. He is known for the roles of Mason Wilder on the CBS soap opera The Young and the Restless (2012 to 2014), Eli Grant on the NBC soap opera Days of Our Lives (2017 to 2022, 2023, 2024), and D'Angelo Carter on The CW series All American (2020 to present).

== Early life ==
Archey was born in Daly City, California and raised in San Mateo by his grandparents. He was an only child and his father died when Archey was 20 years old. He played baseball and football during his first two years of high school. Archey graduated from San Mateo High School. After graduation, he worked as a carpenter and emergency veterinarian technician. In 2001, he decided to move to Los Angeles and live with his uncle.

== Career ==
Less than a year after moving to Los Angeles, Archey was approached by a modeling scout while attending a job fair. He eventually landed modeling jobs for Macy's, Gap Inc., Kohl's, Armani and Dolce & Gabbana. In 2004, he was chosen by Beyoncé to play her love interest in the music video for Destiny's Child's "Cater 2 U". He credits modeling with helping him break out of his shell.

Archey's manager, Michael Bruno, advised him that if he took acting classes, he could get him a job on a soap opera. He was cast in a short film, Let's Get Laid! (2010). Archey also appeared in television commercials for Chase Bank, McDonald's, and Gap Inc. After about two years of acting classes, he was ready to give up. He finally booked two episodes as an under-five on Days of Our Lives, playing Centerville Cop in 2011.

In October 2012, Archey was cast in the recurring role of Mason Wilder on The Young and the Restless. His first air date was December 12, 2012. Archey made his last appearance on the show on January 7, 2014. In 2013, he had a recurring role on Diary of a Champion. He starred in The B Word, a short film about bulimia nervosa.

In 2016, Archey made guest appearances on Cooper Barrett's Guide to Surviving Life and 2 Broke Girls. He had a recurring role on Roadies. He appeared in the film The Woman in the Red Dress. He also narrated the television film Dope Boys.

In December 2016, Archey returned to Days of Our Lives in the newly created contract role of Eli Grant. The character is the grandson of Julie Olson Williams (Susan Seaforth Hayes). Archey's first air date was February 23, 2017. The character of Eli was paired romantically with Lani Price (Sal Stowers).

In 2017, Archey played Vince in the television film Can't Buy My Love. In 2020, Archey guest starred as D'Angelo Carter in the season two finale of The CW series All American. In December 2020, it was announced that Archey would reprise his role in season three in a recurring capacity. He continued to make recurring appearances on the show in seasons four, five, and six.

In 2021, Archey played Eli Grant in Days of Our Lives: Beyond Salem, a spin-off miniseries streaming on Peacock. In June 2022, it was announced that he and his co-star, Sal Stowers, would be leaving Days of Our Lives. His last air date was in early July 2022. Archey made return appearances to Days in 2023 and 2024.

He appeared in the Lifetime film Every Breath She Takes (2023).

== Filmography ==
=== Film ===
Year	Title	Role	Notes
2010	Let's Get Laid!	Sundi	Short film
2014	The B Word	Rashid	Short film
2016	The Woman in the Red Dress	Vin	
2023	Bomb Pizza	Rob	

=== Television ===
Year	Title	Role	Notes
2011	Days of Our Lives	Centerville Cop	Episodes: "Episode #1.11574" & "#1.11575"
2012–2014	The Young and the Restless	Mason Wilder	Recurring role
2013	Diary of a Champion	TJ Lawson	3 episodes
2016	Cooper Barrett's Guide to Surviving Life	Guy	Episode: "How to Survive Losing Your Phone"
2016	Roadies	Detective Rick Davidson	3 episodes
2016	2 Broke Girls	Jake	Episode: "And the 80's Movie"
2017	Can't Buy My Love	Vince	Television film
2017–2022; 2023; 2024	Days of Our Lives	Eli Grant	Contract role 425 episodes
2018	Engaged	Dr. Houston	Television film
2020–2024	All American	D'Angelo Carter	Recurring role 20 episodes
2021	Days of Our Lives: Beyond Salem	Eli Grant	Main Cast: Season 1 4 episodes
2023	Every Breath She Takes	Paul Jones	Television film

=== Music video ===
Year	Artist	Song	Role
2005	Destiny's Child	"Cater 2 U"	Beyoncé Love Interest
