= Catherine Ferrar =

American actress (b. 1946)

- Born: October 22, 1946 (age 78)
- Occupation: Actress
- Years active: 1965-
- Known for: Days of Our Lives; The Sixth Sense

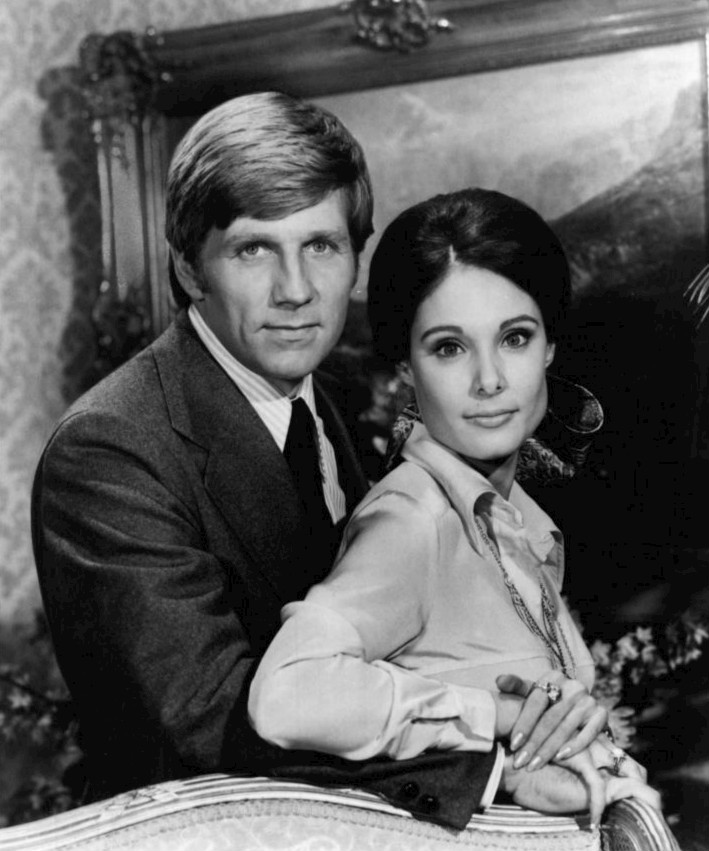
Ferrar and Gary Collins in 1971.

Catherine Ferrar (born October 22, 1946) is an American television actress. She is mostly known for playing the character of Julie Olson Williams on Days of Our Lives in 1967–1968 (before Susan Seaforth-Hayes) and for the lead role of Nancy Murphy in the show The Sixth Sense with Gary Collins. She also guest starred in various shows of the seventies and eighties such as CHiPs and Matt Houston.
