= Doug Williams and Julie Olson =

American soap opera characters

Doug & Julie Williams

Douglas Williams and Julie Olson Williams are fictional characters and a supercouple from the American daytime drama Days of Our Lives. Doug and Julie are considered to be the first supercouple in daytime television history. Doug was portrayed by Bill Hayes and Julie is portrayed by Susan Seaforth Hayes. The actors were married in real life from 1974 until Hayes’ death in 2024, and appeared together in their roles that made them famous on NBC's Days of our Lives from 1970 until 2024.

== Cultural impact ==
Bill Hayes and Susan Seaforth began to develop a romance outside of their characters' storyline. It was "at first publicized by the soapmill as 'just friends,' but slowly it developed into a full-scale love affair." On an October 1974 weekend, the two secretly married. Only a few friends of the couple knew about the event. When the press got knowledge of this, it "set off a commotion among fans, who wrote endless letters to the show asking that the couple also be allowed to get married in the story. If they could get married in real life, so the argument went, they certainly should be able to get together on screen."

The writers of Days of our Lives refused popular demand, and prolonged the anticipation of the two marrying onscreen. In the book All My Afternoons by Annie Gilbert, the event is described:

Nothing was ever such a guarantee of good ratings as star-crossed lovers everyone knew belonged together. But finally the producers set the date for the marriage and Days put on one of the most extravagant weddings imaginable on the screen. It was such a soap opera media event that the local L.A. press (Days, along with General Hospital and The Young and the Restless, which is produced in Los Angeles) was invited to the studio to watch.

In the episode featuring Doug and Julie's honeymoon, Susan Seaforth managed to slip an ad libbed line past the censors that was - for US daytime television in the 1970s - provocative and risque. When Doug (Bill Hayes) asked her what she would like for breakfast, she mentioned items including juice, coffee and "big pink sausage".

Doug and Julie are the only soap opera characters ever to grace the cover of Time magazine. Entertainment Weekly calls them one of the great soap opera supercouples.

== See also ==
- List of supercouples
