= Roark Critchlow =

Canadian actor

- Born: Roark Grant Critchlow; May 11, 1963 (age 63); Calgary, Alberta, Canada
- Occupation: Actor
- Years active: 1989–present
- Spouse: Maria Brewer (1990-2006)
- Children: 3

Roark Grant Critchlow (born May 11, 1963) is a Canadian actor. He is known for starring as Dr. Mike Horton on the American daytime soap opera Days of Our Lives from 1994 to 1999.

== Career ==
From 1994 to 1999, Critchlow starred on the American daytime soap opera Days of Our Lives as Dr. Mike Horton. On June 23, 2010, Roark returned briefly to Days of Our Lives in the role of Dr. Mike Horton. He reprised the role once again on October 4, 2022. He also had a recurring role on the soap Passions in 2003.

Critchlow was in the television film The Perfect Husband: The Laci Peterson Story the Lifetime made-for-TV movie Pregnant at 17 as well as appearing in the Nickelodeon series Drake & Josh as Dr. Glazer. He also portrayed Zoey Brooks' father in Zoey 101. Roark has had smaller roles in movies like Mr. Deeds with Adam Sandler and TV shows such as Street Justice, Malcolm in the Middle, Entourage, Highlander: The Series, Afterworld and Friends. In 2009, he appeared in an episode of the re-imagined Battlestar Galactica. He also appeared in the 2009 movie Hydra as Sean Trotta. Critchlow recently had a recurring role on the science fiction TV show V and on the ABC Family drama television series Pretty Little Liars, where he played Tom Marin, the father of Hanna Marin. He guest starred on Charmed, in which he played a man with the sin of greed.

== Personal life ==
Critchlow was born in Calgary, Alberta, Canada and grew up in Summerland, British Columbia. He was a theater major at the University of Victoria, and married Maria Brewer in 1990, with whom he produced and co-starred in Making it Home. They have three children. They divorced in 2006. Critchlow enjoys many sports and was named after Howard Roark, a character in the book The Fountainhead.

== Filmography ==
Television and film roles
Year	Title	Role	Notes
1989	21 Jump Street	Dave Gibson/Ro	
1990	Cadence	Brooks	Film
1990	The New Adventures of the Black Stallion	Johnny King	
1990	Neon Rider	Garth	
1990	Bordertown	Jake Andrews / Walter Zachuck	
1991	The Commish	Bobby Sturdivant	
1992	Street Justice	Jerry Mitchell	
1992	The Comrades of Summer	Petra	
1992	The Round Table	N/A	
1992	The Man Upstairs	Boy Scout Leader	
1992	Call of the Wild	Arthur	
1994	Cobra	Deputy Beauford	
1994	Highlander	Jason Talbott	
1994–1999, 2010, 2022, 2025	Days of Our Lives	Dr. Mike Horton	
1996	Friends	Dr. Mike Horton	
1998	Making it Home	Joseph Catwood	
2000	How to Marry a Billionaire: A Christmas Tale	Gunther	
2001	V.I.P.	Peter Stiles	
2001	Charmed	Robert Pike	Episode: "Sin Francisco"
2001	Hollywood 7	President of CBL Records	
2001	Asylum Days	Yann Castor	
2002	Mr. Deeds	William	Film
2003	View From The Top	Tennis Pro	Film; uncredited
2003	Hunter	Mike Gambley	
2003	Joan of Arcadia	TV Anchorperson	
2003	Passions	Dr. Ackland	
2004	Creating America's Next Hit Television Show	Ducky #1	
2004	The Perfect Husband: The Laci Peterson Story	Todd Dewey	Television film
2004	Buds for Life	Robert Jamison	
2004	Drake & Josh	Dr. Glazer	
2005	Ghosts Never Sleep	Anchor Garrett	
2005	Komodo vs. Cobra	Major Garber	
2005	Entourage	Mandy's Manager	
2005	Meet the Santas	Mark	
2005	Zoey 101	Mr. Brooks	
2006	Las Vegas	Jerry Ackerman	
2006	Malcolm in the Middle	Vince	
2006	18 Fingers of Death!	Lew Jameson	Direct-to-video film
2006	Pepper Dennis	ADA Robbins	
2006	The Last Stand	Yuppie Lawyer	
2006	AI Assault	Daryl Cage	
2006	Petrified	Buzz York	Direct-to-video film
2007	Eyes	Agent Greg Palmer	
2007	The Bold and the Beautiful	Arthur Harrison	
2007	CSI: Miami	Doug Lansing	
2007	Bone Eater	Deputy Roberts	
2007	Point of Entry	Richard Alden	
2008	Afterworld	Russell Shoemaker	
2008	Urban Decay	Cameron	
2008	On the Bench!	Shane	
2008	Turbo Dates		
2009	Hydra	Sean Trotta	
2009	Battlestar Galactica	Slick	
2009	A View From Here	Robert	
2009	Mending Fences	Robert	
2010	The Mentalist	Mike Brewster	
2011	NCIS	Wayne Grossman	
2011	V	A.D. Paul Kendrick	
2011	Batman: Year One	Hare Krishna	Film; voice role
2011	Earth's Final Hours	Arnett	
2012	Cupid, Inc.	Rick	
2012	Drop Dead Diva	Anton Horn	
2012	True Bloodthirst	Kovacs	
2012	Flashpoint	Staff Sgt. Matt McGrath	
2012	The Twelve Disasters of Christmas	Kane	Television film
2012	Republic of Doyle	Shane Garrett	
2013	Scavengers	Wake	
2013	Dear Sidewalk	Mark	
2013	Mr. West	Bogdan	
2014	SEAL Patrol	Dr. Whitmore	
2014	Arrow	Clinton Hogue	
2014	Cedar Cove	Dan Sherman	
2014	By God's Grace	Bill Watson	
2014	Supernatural	Randy	
2015	Pretty Little Liars	Tom Marin	
2015	A Dangerous Arrangement	Daniel	
2015	UnREAL	Brooks Mackey	
2015	Mother of All Lies	Jason Caskie	
2015	Murdoch Mysteries	Charles Cutter	
2016	Murder, She Baked: A Peach Cobbler Mystery	Douglas	Television film
2016	Heartland	N/A	
2016	Pregnant at 17	Jeff	Television film
2017	Paradise Inc.		
2017	The Layover	Roger	
2017	Tin Star	Inspector Benoit Lehane	
2018	Santa's Boots	John Monroe	Television film (Hallmark)
2023	The Professional Bridesmaid	Evan Shepard	Television film
2021	Debbie Macomber's A Christmas Miracle	Michael	Television Film
2024	Don't Scream, It's me		LMN movie
2024	Searching for a serial killer: The Regina Smith Story		LMN story
