= Julie Olson Williams =

- Days of Our Lives character
- Susan Seaforth Hayes as Julie Olson Williams
- Portrayed by: Charla Doherty (1965–1966); Kathy Dunn (1967); Catherine Ferrar (1967–1968); Susan Seaforth Hayes (1968–present)
- Duration: 1965–1984; 1990–1994; 1996; 1999–present
- First appearance: November 8, 1965
- Created by: Peggy Phillips and Kenneth Rosen
- Introduced by: Ted Corday
In-universe information
- Other names: Julia Olson; Julie Horton; Julie Banning; Julie Anderson
- Occupation: Businesswoman; Hospital administrator; Mansion Proprietor; Bed and breakfast Proprietor; Nightclub owner; Newspaper magnate; Antique shop owner; Coffeehouse owner
- Family: Horton
- Father: Ben Olson
- Mother: Addie Horton
- Brothers: Steven Olson
- Half-sisters: Hope Williams Brady
- Husband: Scott Banning (1970–73); Bob Anderson (1974–1976); Doug Williams (1976–1979, 1981–1986, 1994–2024)
- Sons: David Banning; Robert Anderson, Jr.
- Grandsons: Scotty Banning; Eli Grant
- Grandfathers: Tom Horton
- Grandmothers: Alice Horton
- Uncles: Tom Horton, Jr. Mickey Horton; Bill Horton
- Aunts: Marie Horton
- Nephews: Spencer Olson; Shawn-Douglas Brady; Zack Brady
- Nieces: Ciara Brady
- First cousins: Sandy Horton; Melissa Horton (adoptive); Sarah Horton (legal); Mike Horton; Jennifer Horton; Lucas Horton; Jessica Blake Fallon
- Other relatives: David Grant; Jules Grant; Carver Grant

Julie Olson Williams is a fictional character on the American television series Days of Our Lives, a soap opera broadcast on NBC. A member of the Horton family, the core family of the series, Julie has been played by Susan Seaforth Hayes off and on since 1968, making her one of the longest-tenured actors in American soap operas, and the only actor to appear in all seven decades of the series.

The character of Julie was introduced as a 16-year-old when the show premiered in 1965, with 19-year-old Charla Doherty being the first actress to play Julie. The role was unsuccessfully recast twice with Kathy Dunn in 1967, followed by Catherine Ferrar from 1967 until 1968. The role was then taken over by actress Susan Seaforth Hayes in 1968, who still portrays the character to this day. Julie is the last remaining character from the pilot, and Hayes the earliest-appearing actor to appear currently on the serial. Hayes is most recognizable in the role, having portrayed the character in the show all seven decades it has been on the air.

Doug Williams and Julie Olson were the first super couple in the history of the daytime industry. The January 12, 1976, cover of Time magazine featured Days of our Lives' Bill Hayes and Susan Seaforth Hayes, the first and only daytime actors to ever appear on its cover. The Hayeses themselves were a couple whose onscreen and real-life romance (they met on the series in 1970 and married in 1974) was widely covered by both the soap opera magazines and the mainstream press.

Julie was often the subject of notable press during the time on her serial. Widely read magazines would routinely publish forthcoming developments in her storylines. For her work as Julie, Susan Seaforth Hayes has been nominated for the Daytime Emmy Award for Lead Actress in a Drama Series in 1975, 1976, 1978, and 1979 and for Supporting Actress in a Drama Series in 2018 and 2020. No other actress has received as many nominations for their work on Days. She has also won two Soapy Awards for Best Actress and Favorite Romantic Female in 1977. She has been described as a legend, and television icon for the soap.

== Creation and development ==
=== Background ===
Ted Corday and Irna Phillips created Julie in the 1960s as part of the story bible for Days of our Lives, a light-hearted soap opera focusing on the troubles of its core family, the Hortons. The Cordays and Bell combined the "hospital soap" idea with the tradition of centering a series on a family, by making the show about a family of doctors, including one who worked in a mental hospital. The Julie character officially aired on November 8, 1965, when the show premiered on NBC in color. Julie was the sole character to represent the younger side of the series' main family compared to her adult co-stars. She was the first character to ever speak on the serial when it first broadcast in 1965, and was also the star of the two main scenes in the serial. Julie was also the first to mention the last name of the series when she gave a false name (Julie Horton) to a police officer when he arrested her for theft of a mink stole.

=== Casting ===
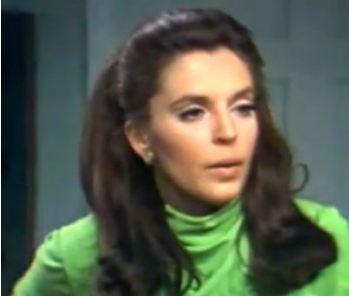
Susan Seaforth as Julie Olson in 1970

At the time, soap operas featured mostly older casts. To add a contemporary feel to the show, Corday and Philips focused on younger characters, while also mixing in older ones so as not to lose traditional soap opera viewers. Charla Doherty originated the role of Julie on November 8, 1965, when the show first premiered. Doherty had been in previous short roles on Wagon Train and Dr. Kildare. Charla was quite a bit younger than her co-stars when the show first aired in 1965. Frances Reid was in her fifties, as was MacDonald Carey. Maree Cheatham was in her early twenties, John Clarke and Patricia Huston were both in their thirties, with Doherty being in her late teens and early twenties during her first few years on the program.

In 1966, Doherty departed the serial to focus on other career options, last appearing on December 23 of that year. The role went through two unsuccessful recasts. The show replaced Doherty with actress Catherine Dunn from January 24 to June 20, 1967, who was in turn replaced by Catherine Ferrar that same year from July 13, 1967, until September 2, 1968. Both actresses proved to be unpopular in the role and were both fired. William J. Bell - the show's main writer at the time - decided to give the character a short break from the serial.

On December 11, 1968, the character reappeared onscreen. The role was now played by newcomer actress, Susan Seaforth Hayes (credited as "Susan Seaforth" because she had not yet met her husband Bill). Susan's previous soap roles included General Hospital and The Young Marrieds, but made a few appearances on Hallmark Hall of Fame, Bonanza, and Dragnet. In portraying Julie, the actress drew on the "self-centered" and "haughty" traits she recognized in herself while in college. In 1970, Bill Hayes joined the cast as Doug Williams. The Hayeses themselves were a couple whose onscreen and real-life romance (they met on the series in 1970) was widely covered by both the soap opera magazines and the mainstream press. Bill and Susan eventually fell in love and married, becoming the first soap couple to be together in real life (they married in 1974). With Frances Reid's passing in 2010, Susan Hayes is the only cast member to have aired on Days of our Lives in all seven decades that it has been on the air. Macdonald Carey often helped her in her early years on the show.

Mac had been helpful to me. earlier. Once I had a job, I had a tendency to read a script and point out the flaws and imperfections of other people’s writing. And often it was quite a list. After a few weeks of this, he said to me, "You’ll catch more honey with flies than vinegar here."

=== Archetypes ===
Over the years Julie developed into different character archetypes. Soap operas once featured only one-dimensional characters who were either good or bad. By the 1970s, characters were written with more depth, fitting into archetypes consisting of the young-and-vulnerable romantic heroine, the old-fashioned villain, the rival, the suffering antagonist, Mr. Right, the former playboy, the meddlesome and villainous mother/grandmother, the benevolent mother/grandmother, and the career woman. Julie was established as the rival to Susan Martin's young-and-vulnerable romantic heroine. As the rival, Julie was written as a younger leading heroine, often portraying her vulnerable sides. Julie was generally positioned as the main protagonist being part of the prestigious Horton family.

By the late 1970s, a different set of character types was established, including the chic suburbanite, the subtle single, the traditional family person, the successful professional, and the elegant socialite. Julie was in the elegant socialite category which comprised "flashy", achievement-oriented characters that often loved their families and friends. Like others in this category, Julie was written as "flamboyant", "frivolous and carefree". Overall, Julie is the embodiment of "young hero", a soap opera archetype that "transformed and defined" the soap opera genre. Irna Phillips, Nixon, and William J. Bell created the archetype in the 1960s and it became one of their defining legacies. The archetype is an assertive Cinderella who goes after material things.

=== Lineage and personality ===
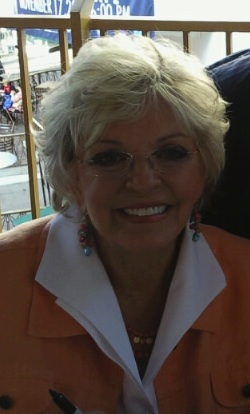
Julie is a member of the high class Horton family, around which Days of our Lives was originally built.

Julie is a headstrong teenager when Days of our Lives premiered in 1965. She is part of the soaps core family, the Hortons, around which the soap was originally structured. At the beginning of the serial in 1965, Julie was a 16 year old schoolgirl. The fictional history of her younger years has been told via behind-the-scenes books such as Days of our Lives: The True Story of one Family's Dream, and the second tie-in novel by Ken Corday, which explains that Julie was born and raised in Salem with the rest of her family before the show premiered.

Whereas most of the other female characters in Days of our Lives were portrayed in a somewhat more glamorous working class way, Julie Olson was the exception to the rule, being the sole character to represent the emotional side of the Horton family. As the serial progresses, Julie grew and matured much like the other characters. After the death of her mother Addie Horton in 1974, Julie matured into a young heroine, often helping to raise her baby sister, Hope Williams. Julie married Doug in the seventies and the two have remained relatively intact ever since. They are known as daytime's first supercouple. In more recent years, Julie has become a pillar of the community, representing the Horton family and their values. She is respected by many and is often seen giving advice or helping others. Julie also has a protective side and will do anything to protect and defend her family.

== Storylines ==
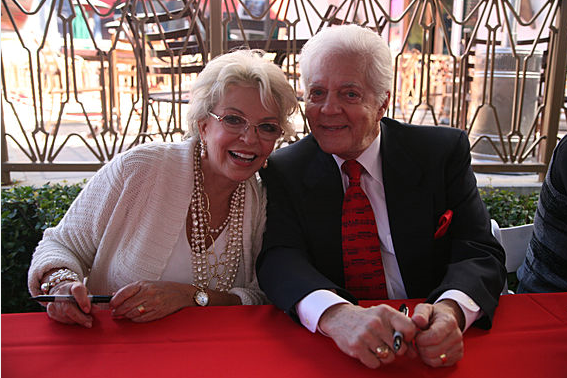
Susan Seaforth Hayes and husband Bill Hayes portray Julie and Doug who are considered to be daytime's very first Supercouple.

Julie was born on March 31, 1949, to Addie Horton and Ben Olson. As Days of our Lives begins in 1965, Julie is a rebellious teenager part of the series's Horton family. In the first episode, Julie steals an expensive mink from a department store and is caught by a security guard and arrested. Julie moves in with her grandparents, Tom and Alice Horton, when her parents move to Europe. She plans on eloping with David Martin, but backs out after talking to Tom about it. Later, Julie pursues David while he is married to her best friend Susan, and maintains hope that he will leave Susan one day and marry her. However, that dream is shattered in 1967 when Susan, who blames David for the death of their son, kills David. During Susan's court trial, Julie is exposed as being pregnant with David's child. Julie eventually gives birth to a son whom she names David Jr and, following Tom's advice, she gives the child up for adoption. The baby is adopted by Scott and Janet Banning. After Janet dies of a brain tumor, Julie marries Scott and they raise David together.

Doug and Julie as they appeared the cover of Time on January 12, 1976.

In 1970, Julie meets Doug Williams who, at the time, is being paid by Susan Martin to have an affair with Julie. Incidentally, Julie falls in love with Doug and vice versa. In the summer of 1972, the time came for Doug and Julie to elope. Her divorce petition was just about ready, and he had the arrangements for their Italian honeymoon all set. But at the last minute, Doug and Julie had a fight that would change their lives drastically. Julie insisted on bringing David along on the honeymoon. Doug was opposed to this idea; he also did not agree with Julie's plans to take David away from Scott, who loved the boy as his own son. During their fight, Julie walked out on Doug. Later that night, Addie stopped by and asked Doug to marry her. On the rebound, and always up for an adventure, Doug agreed. At midnight, Doug and Addie left for Portofino using the tickets that he had meant to use with Julie- a decision which crushed Julie.

In 1973, Julie's husband, Scott, is killed in a construction accident while working for Anderson Manufacturing. Phyllis and Bob Anderson feel guilty and offer Julie a house and financial support, and Bob soon divorces Phyllis and marries Julie. Julie deals with another blow when Addie is diagnosed with cancer and discovers she is pregnant with Doug's child, Julie's half-sister. Addie gives birth to daughter Hope and falls into a coma. Addie comes out of her coma and makes Julie promise to care for the baby and Doug. However, Addie goes into remission only to be killed in a hit and run accident. In 1975, Julie suffers a miscarriage and divorces Bob the following year to reunite with Doug. Shortly after Doug and Julie announce their engagement, Kim Douglas shows up in Salem claiming to the legal wife of Brent Douglas, Doug's real name. After a few months, Kim eventually reveals that she and Doug had been divorced for many years, so Julie and Doug marry. In 1977, Doug falls on hard times when he loses his liquor license and, eventually, the club. Julie buys back the club and turns it into Doug's Coffee House, but Doug is forced to leave Salem for a while to take care of business elsewhere. During his absence, Julie faces problems with the club staff and Larry Atwood helps her through it. Julie is not aware that Larry set Doug up in a dope bust to keep him out of Salem while he goes after Julie. When Julie finds out what Larry did to Doug, she confronted him, Larry rapes Julie in his apartment to keep her quiet about setting Doug up. Julie is traumatized by the rape making her act distance towards Doug when he returns with the charged conveniently drop. He suspects something is going on because of the way Julie is acting toward him. Doug received a letter from Jerri Clayton telling him that Julie's having an affair with Larry, after seeing her go into his apartment the day, of the rape. Doug then talks to a neighbor who watch Hope that same night tells Doug how Juile came home with her dress torn, her excuse to the neighbor was the dress was torn when it was caught in the car door. This makes Doug more suspicious, her of having an affair with Larry. With Jerris letter and the neighbor telling him about the torn dress and Julie acting distant with him after his return Doug confronted Julie forcing her to tell him that Larry raped her. Doug goes after Larry who is murdered, he is the main suspect at first until the investigation turns to Julie. She is arrested for Larry's murder goes to trial and is forced to testify to in court to Larry raping her. Things didn't look good for Julie after her testimony making her more likely to have kill him. This also cause Doug to become impotent with the knowledge of Julie's rape. It was discovered during the trail that Arlo Roberts killed Larry for a business deal gone bad. When he confesses to the murder Julie is cleared of all charges Doug is no longer impotent life goes back to normal with Julie getting counseling from Laura for the rape. In 1979, Julie is badly burned by Maggie Horton's oven when it blows up in her face. When Julie sees the scars from her injuries, she is sure that Doug will no longer want her as his wife. When a reconstructive operation fails, Julie flies to Mexico and gets a divorce behind Doug's back. She has a successful operation, but by this time, he has married his widowed sister-in-law, Lee Dumonde. Determined to hang onto Doug, Lee tries to have Julie killed by a hit man but fails. After divorcing Lee, Doug remarries Julie, and they settle into a happy marriage. They become involved with an investigation of Stefano DiMera's criminal activities that ends with his presumed death. Their contentment is interrupted by Doug's heart attack after finding Hope about to make love with Bo Brady. In early 1984, Doug and Julie decide to take a cruise around the world, but by 1986 have separated again. Doug comes back to town without her, indicating that Julie's opening of a dress shop in Paris became more important to her than their marriage. Later, Doug leaves for parts unknown, still not reconciled with Julie.

Julie returns to the show in 1990 when her partner Nick is murdered. She is on the cruise of deception where Hope is believed to be killed by Ernest Toscano. In 1993, Doug, pretending that he is dying, convinces her to visit him, but it is only a ploy to win her back. Still very much in love with him, Julie reconciles with Doug, and they continue their world traveling. They visit later in the year to see an ailing Tom, and come back the following year for his funeral where they are reunited with an amnesiac Hope who has returned from being believed to be dead. Over the next couple of years, Doug and Julie are seen on and off, mostly at family holidays such as the annual Horton Fourth of July picnic and the annual Christmas tree decorating. Julie and Doug come back to town for an extended visit in 2004 and are soon enmeshed in the Salem serial killer storyline. Julie is devastated when Doug is seemingly killed by the serial killer, and she begins to focus on helping Mickey get over Maggie while keeping him from the advances of his housekeeper, Bonnie. After Alice is also apparently killed, it is revealed that old family friend Marlena Evans was the culprit, and when Marlena shows up at the funeral to give her respects, Julie loses her cool and threatens to kill her. When Maggie and Doug turn up alive and well (along with Alice and the other alleged victims, including the actually innocent Marlena), Doug and Julie work to help Maggie get Mickey (who is now married to Bonnie) back. Their joint effort is ultimately successful.

In the summer of 2006, Doug and Julie come to town to discover that Lexie has been kept prisoner in the tunnels underneath the old "Doug's Place." They help rescue Lexie and nurse her back to health. Doug and Julie return the following summer in 2007 for Bo and Hope's 4 July BBQ and they advise Bo and Hope about dealing with Chelsea dating someone of whom they do not initially approve. They return a few weeks later to watch Bo and Hope renew their wedding vows. Julie and Doug later convince Maggie to get the very busy Mickey to take a cruise with her to strengthen her marriage, but are devastated when Mickey dies of a heart attack before they can leave. Several months later, Doug and Julie gather around the family with the news that Alice is nearing death. They are present to say goodbye to the Horton family matriarch with several other family members who had not been seen on screen in years. Julie (with or without Doug) has made sporadic appearances ever since (most notably when Nick Fallon was believed dead and, again, when he was actually killed). Both Doug and Julie were highly involved with the show's 50th anniversary and were around to help Hope deal with the sudden death of Bo Brady from cancer and to comfort Maggie after her son, Daniel, was killed in a car accident. Julie would find herself a major supporter of both Hope and Maggie, especially when Hope killed Stefano DiMera whom she blamed for Bo's death, and when Maggie broke her spine due to a fall down the stairs.

In 2017, Julie is devastated when she hears from Scotty, her grandson, that David was killed in a motorbike accident. However, she is delighted to find out that she has another grandson, Eli Grant, and welcomes him into the Horton family, although is angry at his mother, Valerie Grant, for not allowing Eli contact with his father.

In late 2018, when everyone thinks Abigail Deveraux's alters have returned, Julie is the only one that believes her that they have not and that Gabi Hernandez has been framing Abigail this whole time. In order to prove it, Julie goes into Gabi's room for proof. Julie finds the true results of Charlotte's paternity, Gabi later walks in and is furious. The two fight at the top of the stairs and Gabi pushes her. Julie falls into a brief coma, but wakes up just in time for Christmas. Later, Julie remembers what she read about Charlotte's paternity and that Chad DiMera, not Stefan DiMera, is the true father.

== Reception ==
Julie has been described as one of Days of our Lives's most high-profile characters. Hayes has won several awards for her performance as Julie. In 1977, she won a Soapy award for outstanding lead actress in a daytime drama. She has been nominated for a Daytime Emmy award four times; once in 1975, 1976, 1978 and another in 1979. The character has been received quite favorably. Hayes is known for "dominating the seventies" in the daytime genre.

Critics originally praised the show for its non-reliance on nostalgia (in contrast to shows such as As the World Turns) and its portrayal of "real American contemporary families." By the 1970s, critics deemed Days the most daring daytime drama, as it led the way in using then-controversial themes that other shows of the period avoided, such as artificial insemination and interracial romance. The January 12, 1976, cover of Time magazine featured Days of our Lives's Bill Hayes and Susan Seaforth Hayes, the first and only daytime actors to ever appear on its cover. The Hayeses themselves were a couple whose onscreen and real-life romance (they met on the series in 1970 and married in 1974) was widely covered by both the soap opera magazines and the mainstream press.

In 2020, Charlie Mason from Soaps She Knows placed Julie #8 on their list of the 35 most memorable characters from Days of Our Lives, calling the character a "harried heroine" who was "brought to life by Susan Seaforth Hayes".

== See also ==
- Days of Our Lives
- Doug Williams
