= Roadies (TV series) =

American comedy-drama television series

- Genre: Comedy drama
- Created by: Cameron Crowe
- Starring: Luke Wilson; Carla Gugino; Imogen Poots; Rafe Spall; Keisha Castle-Hughes; Peter Cambor; Colson Baker; Ron White
- Country of origin: United States
- Original language: English
- No. of seasons: 1
- No. of episodes: 10

Production
- Executive producers: Cameron Crowe; J. J. Abrams; Winnie Holzman; Bryan Burk; Len Goldstein
- Producers: Iain Paterson; Peter Schindler; Kelly Curtis; Tamara Isaac
- Cinematography: Nicola B. Marsh; Thomas Yatsko
- Editors: Joe Hutshing; Jon Dudkowski; David Bilow
- Camera setup: Single-camera
- Running time: 60 minutes
- Production companies: Bad Robot; Vinyl Films; Warner Bros. Television; Showtime Networks

Original release
- Network: Showtime
- Release: June 26 – August 28, 2016

Roadies is an American comedy-drama television series created by Cameron Crowe. The series premiered on Showtime on June 26, 2016.

On September 16, 2016, Showtime announced that the series had been canceled after one season.

== Cast ==
=== Main ===
- Carla Gugino as Shelli Anderson, the tour's production manager. Christina Hendricks was originally cast in the role.
- Imogen Poots as Kelly Ann Mason, a recently hired lighting rigger with the Staton-House road crew. She is torn between attending film school and staying on with the band
- Luke Wilson as Bill Hanson, the tour manager of The Staton-House Band, a fictional arena-level group from Denver
- Rafe Spall as Reg Whitehead, a financial advisor from England
- Keisha Castle-Hughes as Donna Mancini, soundboard operator
- Colson Baker as Wesley "Wes" Mason, a recently fired Pearl Jam roadie and twin brother of Kelly Ann
- Peter Cambor as Milo, bass guitar tech
- Ron White as Phil
- Christopher Backus as Rick, hard-partying bassist with The Staton-House Band
- Jacqueline Byers as Natalie Shayne, stalker of The Staton-House Band

=== Recurring ===
- Tanc Sade as Christopher House, guitarist, and songwriter of The Staton-House Band
- Catero Alain Colbert as Tom Staton, lead singer of The Staton-House Band
- Ethan Michael Mora as Winston, the ill-behaved son of Tom Staton, lead singer of The Staton-House Band
- Brian Benben as Preston, Staton-House Band manager
- Luis Guzmán as Gooch, crew tour bus driver
- Finesse Mitchell as Harvey, an accountant with the Staton-House Band road crew
- Lamon Archey as Detective Rick Davidson
- Joy Williams as Janine Beckwith, former girlfriend of Christopher House and the subject of Staton-House's most beloved song "Janine"
- David Spade stars as a fictionalized version of himself, star of the recurring show-within-the-show Dead Sex

== Production ==
The soundtrack consists of indie music songs, featuring on-screen performances and cameo interactions by The Head and the Heart, Reignwolf, Lindsey Buckingham, The Ting Tings, Lucius, Halsey, Jim James, Phantogram, John Mellencamp, Eddie Vedder, Robyn Hitchcock, Jackson Browne, Greg Leisz, Gary Clark Jr. and Nicole Atkins.

== Episodes ==
| No. | Title | Directed by | Written by | Original release date | US viewers (millions) |
|---|---|---|---|---|---|
| 1 | "Life is a Carnival" | Cameron Crowe | Cameron Crowe | June 13, 2016 (online); June 26, 2016 (Showtime) | 0.348 |
Bill Hanson (tour manager of Staton-House Band) and Shelli Anderson, the tour's production manager, gather with the band’s crew to start preparing for a concert. Lighting rigger Kelly Ann Mason decides to leave and enroll in film school. The band arrives for rehearsals, but the stage is not ready yet. British financial advisor Reg Whitehead arrives on set and tells Phil, a member of the band's organization who has caused legal trouble, that manager Preston wants to fire him. Kelly Ann receives a warm goodbye from Bill and the crew. She hears that Natalie Shayne, a groupie who is banned from the band's performances, is in the building and decides to take her down. Kelly finds her in the band's dressing room, where Natalie snatches the microphone used by Bruce Springsteen in his "Dancing in the Dark" video. Kelly chases her on a skateboard and gets it back. She remembers a film she made, with movie characters experiencing a detour in their lives and retracing their steps. Kelly runs back into the building and decides to stay on tour. Guest: The Head and the Heart
| 2 | "What Would Phil Do?" | Cameron Crowe | Winnie Holzman | June 27, 2016 (online); July 3, 2016 (Showtime) | 0.353 |
After a disastrous opening show in New Orleans, the band's crew heads to Memphis. Shelli and Bill argue about whether the firecracker was intentional or accidental. Reg tells both managers about his decision to cut one member off and his need to interview each crew member to decide. Bill gathers the roadies for the ritual morning circle traditionally run by Phil. Wearing "What Would Phil Do?" T-shirts, the crew suffers after Phil is fired. Bill cannot fill Phil's shoes. Shelli tasks Kelly Ann with running the teleprompter. She meets with songwriter and guitarist Christopher House for the set list but ends up ranting about raisins, which inspires him to fire Reg. Kelly Ann realizes that Reg is a benefactor of the "WWPD" T-shirts when he confronts her, assuming that she tried to get him fired. Bill asks Christopher to stop doing the fingertip kiss, because it annoys lead singer Tom Staton. Fans begin doing the fingertip kiss, forcing Christopher to change his mind and return it. Guest: Reignwolf
| 3 | "The Bryce Newman Letter" | Cameron Crowe | Cameron Crowe | July 10, 2016 | 0.329 |
The tour arrives in Atlanta. Bill, who is known for dating young women, is in bed with beautiful, young Cassie. The roadies are outraged after music critic Bryce Newman writes a negative review about the band, calling it "relentlessly irrelevant". Reg decides to neutralize Newman, and invites him to the show. He tells the crew and asks Wes Mason, a useless member, to make Newman a "memorable espresso". Newman, escorted by Natalie (whom the crew agrees to allow backstage if she collaborates with this mission), is treated like a king. The coffee kicks in, and Newman begins acting crazy. While Bill and Reg fight backstage about the disastrous state of the crew, a drugged Newman goes onstage, strips himself naked, and is taken to the hospital. Cassie breaks up with Bill, and Reg decides to fire Wes. He changes his mind after Newman writes a heartwarming review of the band and crew, thanking Reg and Wes for the coffee. Guest: Lindsey Buckingham
| 4 | "The City Whose Name Must Not Be Spoken" | Jeffrey Reiner | Hannah Friedman | July 17, 2016 | 0.262 |
En route to Louisville, the crew discusses plans for a day off. Reg disrupts that when he says the "C" word ("Cincinnati"), which the crew believes will curse the tour. To break the curse, Gooch drives the bus 100 miles in the wrong direction; the crew has to find 11 eggs and balloons on foot, smash the eggs, release the balloons, and play a song by The Who. Shelli cannot reach bassist Rick by phone, and suspects that he took off after an emotional concert. The two managers look for him by car, putting their day-off plan on hold. After they drive 100 miles, Kelly Ann and Reg hunt for eggs; they barge into a farmhouse, and steal eggs from the refrigerator. On their way back, they tell each other that they are not looking for attachment. Wes and Milo, the guitar tech, find balloons attached to a "House For Sale" sign. The crew members break the eggs and release the balloons, singing "They Are All in Love". After breaking the curse, Milo has a revelation about Rick's location: in a strip club, sleeping with Natalie. Guest: Jim James
| 5 | "Friends and Family" | Allison Liddi-Brown | David J. Rosen | July 24, 2016 | 0.291 |
On the first day in Denver, Shelli goes through a dry spell which no amount of phone sex with her husband will fix. The crew thinks Kelly Ann and Reg are hooking up, but she angrily keeps rejecting the ideas of relationship or attachment. Reg learns that Janine, who broke the singer Christopher's heart, is attending the concert without backstage access. He decides to meet her and see if he can get the band’s recordings and journals back for the box set. He finds Janine in the crowd; they spend time together, and ultimately click. Chris asks Bill to get the magic jacket from his storage unit, which now belongs to his ex. At the end of a long day, Bill finds Shelli backstage looking disconnected and upset. She becomes angry with him for not answering any of her voicemails or calls, but her anger dissipates when he hugs her. They finally make love, under a supermoon. Guest: Lucius
| 6 | "Longest Days" | Jonathan Kasdan | Cameron Crowe & Tom Kapinos | July 31, 2016 | 0.242 |
On the second day in Denver, the crew discusses their least-favorite phrases. Shelli and Bill face the repercussions of the supermoon night, and agree not to repeat it. Kelly Ann awkwardly invites Reg to watch a movie, but he is happy hanging out with Janine. He invites Janine to meet Christopher backstage and put their "ancient story" to bed. Janine tells Chris that he used her love to sell records, but never reached out to her. She stirs things up when she admits making love to Bill while dating Chris. Reg cannot get Jack White to open for the band, but comedian Marc Maron (who flies in from LA to help Rick stay sober) offers to do a 15-minute standup show instead. Tom’s son Winston wants to learn guitar, so his nanny (Wes) brings him to meet John Mellencamp. Reg risks losing his job after being used by Janine to get the closure she always wanted. Guest: John Mellencamp
| 7 | "Carpet Season" | Julie Anne Robinson | David J. Rosen | August 7, 2016 | 0.310 |
In Seattle, Bill attends an AA meeting and describes himself as a carpet salesman. He admits that being with Shelli brings out the best in him, and wonders if that is his only opportunity in life. Reg and Bill discuss Chris' missing iPad and Janine's missing yearbook. They and Phil decide to track down band archivist Mike Finger and retrieve the tour items he has been secretly collecting. On her birthday, Shelli is trying to keep busy and get over cheating on her husband. Wes is invited to join musical guest star Halsey on tour, but later turns the offer down. Abby Van Ness arrives backstage for a scheduled photo session. Kelly Ann is a fan of her work, but her admiration soon vanishes with close interaction. Abby soon earns everyone's disdain, and the session descends into mayhem. Guest: Halsey
| 8 | "The All Night Bus Ride" | Sam Jones | Cameron Crowe | August 14, 2016 | 0.286 |
The tour bus heads to California on a 12-hour trip. Phil regales the crew with the story behind his glorious career as a roadie, when his job accidentally changed from cigar smuggler to assistant road manager for Lynyrd Skynyrd. Everyone is moved as Phil speaks about his strong bond with Ronnie Van Zant, which lasted until Van Zant's death. Reg tells Kelly Ann that all the crew are going on the European tour, but he later discovers that he has to omit some members due to budget restrictions. As he is navigating through the numbers, he arrives at the surprising conclusion that he has been hired to destroy the band; Tom Staton could go solo. Bill and Shelli’s affair grows blurrier as she leaves the bus to attend her father-in-law's funeral. At the end of a long ride, full of stories and tears, the crew commemorates Van Zant and Phil by singing "Simple Man". Guest: N/A
| 9 | "The Corporate Gig" | Jon Kasdan | Cameron Crowe & Winnie Holzman | August 21, 2016 | 0.345 |
"Time to sell out", says Phil as the band lands in San Diego for a corporate gig. Puna, an intuitive head of security, warns Bill about something happening that night. Kelly Ann is not yet ready to sell out after reading a letter she wrote to herself at 16. Reg cannot cope with the cancellation of the tour of Europe and his trip back to England. He gets drunk, wanders around and meets Kelly Ann (who is drunk too). Vulnerable, wasted and open, they kiss and agree to have sex in Europe. Tom Staton asks Shelli to manage the band, but she rejects the offer unless Bill joins her as co-manager. Shortly before he dies, Phil reassures Reg that what breaks the band is the conflict between Chris and Tom. When he collapses, Phil whispers into Kelly Ann’s ear. Guest: Phantogram
| 10 | "The Load Out" | Cameron Crowe | Cameron Crowe & Winnie Holzman | August 28, 2016 | 0.308 |
In Los Angeles, the band and crew bid goodbye to Phil. They organize a star-studded funeral with Eddie Vedder, Robyn Hitchcock, Jim James, Gary Clark Jr, Jackson Browne, Nicole Atkins, and Lucius. Shelli's husband, Sean, also attends. Eager to rekindle their relationship, he offers her a trip to the Maldives. Shelli has other dreams, however, and is not ready to give them up. Bill asks Kelly Ann to reveal Phil's last word to her; she goes on stage and says "Pistachio". Later, she discovers that "Pistachio" is the nickname Phil picked for her. Chris shows up at the wake with Janine, and hugs Tom. Reg asks Kelly Ann to go to England with him, but Kelly Ann cannot leave the band; neither can Reg.

== Reception ==
On Metacritic, season one of Roadies holds a score of 47, indicating "mixed or average reviews" based on 30 critics.

Review aggregator Rotten Tomatoes reported that 36% of critics gave the first season a positive review, saying "Roadies' condescending tone, boring and underdeveloped characters, and lack of dramatic intrigue lead to a failure to rock."
