= Abe Carver =

- Days of our Lives character
- Portrayed by: James Reynolds
- Duration: 1981–present
- First appearance: October 29, 1981
- Created by: Pat Falken Smith
- Introduced by: Betty Corday and Al Rabin
- Spin-off appearances: Days of Our Lives: Beyond Salem (2021)
In-universe information
- Other names: Abraham Washington Carver
- Occupation: Mayor of Salem; Salem police commissioner Chief of Police; Police officer Soap opera producer
- Parents: Benjamin Carver; Rita Carver
- Brothers: Theo Carver; Jonah Carver
- Sisters: Karen Carver
- Wife: Lexie Brooks (1991–2012); Paulina Price (2022–present)
- Sons: Brandon Walker; Theo Carver
- Adoptive daughters: Lani Price
- Stepdaughters: Chanel Dupree
- Grandsons: David Grant (adoptive); Carver Grant (adoptive) Trey DiMera (step)
- Granddaughters: Jules Grant (adoptive)
- Nephews: Jett Carver

Abe Carver is a fictional character on the long-running American soap opera Days of Our Lives. Actor James Reynolds has played the character since he originated it on the series in 1981, and is currently the fifth longest serving actor on the show. The role is one of the longest-running African American characters in American soap operas. The character was created by head writer Pat Falken Smith. Abe is the widowed husband of Lexie Carver, daughter of international crime lord, Stefano DiMera. He is the father of Brandon Walker and Theo Carver and the adoptive father of Lani Price.

== Storylines ==
Abe grows up in Salem with his siblings, Theo, Jonah and Karen. His passion for justice starts young, but amplifies after Theo is killed by a crooked police officer. Abe joins the Salem Police Department determined to rid the city of filth, including international crime lord, Stefano DiMera. Abe is also the police officer who investigates Anna Brady's claim that she was sold into white slavery. She reports the existence of her secret Swiss bank account to her husband, Roman Brady.

Abe starts a relationship with Nikki Wade, but this is cut short after he stands her up at a débutante ball in favor of heading up a drug bust. He is also in two short-lived relationships with Dr. Valerie Grant and singer Tamara Price. Before Abe's promotion to police chief, he meets and marries Lexie Brooks. Over the years, their marriage gets compromised due to Lexie being the daughter of Stefano.

His next major storyline involves the Aremid wedding of Peter Blake and Jennifer Horton. Abe is caught up in the investigation of Tony DiMera's murder. Abe and Lexi go to Paris to find Marlena Evans when Stefano kidnapped her. They end up finding and saving Marlena and catching Stefano but are unable to prosecute him, because only Stefano has a drug that can save Roman's life. Abe, Lexi, and John Black help break Stefano out of jail and later he is pardoned for his crimes after returning to Salem with the drug Roman needed.

Later, Abe and Lexie adopt baby Isaac, thinking he is the child of DiMera henchman Wilhelm Rolf. Isaac is actually the son of Bo Brady and Hope Brady who was switched at birth by Stefano. Abe is later appalled to learn that Lexie knew of the switch, but hides the truth from him. Abe files for divorce but after Lexie helps Hope, Brady and her son Zack, Lexie and Abe reconcile.

Brandon Walker comes to Salem with a deep hatred of Abe. Lexie sleeps with Brandon in a weak moment and becomes pregnant, unsure if Abe or Brandon is the father. It is revealed Abe is the father and Lexie and Abe reconcile for good. Brandon's presence causes issues for Abe until it is revealed that Brandon is Abe's illegitimate son with Fay Walker. After some time, Abe and Brandon embrace each other as family, and have since had a good relationship.

In 2003, Abe is supposedly dead on the day of Theo's christening, becoming the first victim of the Salem Stalker serial killer. Months later, he is revealed to be alive – his death having been faked – on a remote tropical island, Melaswen, which is a complete replica of Salem. He works together with Roman and the others to escape the island. Abe is reunited with Lexie and Theo but goes blind as a result of an injury he got while escaping Melaswen and learns that he is impotent. His anger shines through and he becomes paranoid that Lexie is cheating. Eventually, Abe's eyesight is restored but an anonymous note leads him to a motel where he finds Lexie having sex with his protege, Salem police officer Tek Kramer. Their marriage is in turmoil for a while until Abe uses Lexie in the investigation of her half-brother, EJ DiMera, and Abe falls back in love with her. They stay together until Lexie disappears on December 29, 2006.

Abe's eyesight starts to deteriorate again and he undergoes a second retina transplant. At the same time, Lexie is found in the tunnels under Doug's Place and the DiMera mansion, where André DiMera has kept her against her will for months. The transplant is successful and Abe returns to work as the Commissioner of the Salem Police Department. In the fall of 2010, Abe returned full-time to the screen. He began investigating the murders of the people of Salem, because he did not want anyone going through what he already had. However, the tables may turn on him when Stefano decided that he was going to frame Abe for the murders.

In June 2012, Lexie, who has cancer, died peacefully in Abe's arms.

In 2015, Abe finds out that he has a daughter, Lani Price, that he fathered with Tamara.

In 2021, it was revealed that Lani wasn't his daughter but actually the daughter of Tamara's sister Paulina, and that Tamara had raised Lani as her own child. However, that did not impact their relationship and eventually Abe legally adopted Lani.

== Cultural impact and reception ==
James Reynolds' portrayal of Abe Carver since 1981 has made Abe the longest-running African American character in American soap opera history. Having logged more hours on television than most actors, Reynolds is also a humanitarian and his work on Days of our Lives helps continue his work. For his role as Abe Carver, James Reynolds earned a Daytime Emmy Award nomination for Outstanding Supporting Actor in 2004, and won the award for Outstanding Lead Actor in 2018.

Abe was a minority character of tremendous integrity who was not working for somebody else. He was in charge—and that meant a lot to the African American audience. It had real impact.

— James Reynolds

In 2020, Charlie Mason from Soaps She Knows placed Abe 31st on their list of the 35 most memorable characters from Days of Our Lives, saying that "For going on four decades, James Reynolds’ stand-up character has had the thankless job of being Salem’s voice of reason. None of your wackadoo neighbors may listen, Abe, but we hear you, loud and clear." That same year, Mason and Candace Young from Soaps She Knows put Abe on their list of Daytime's Most Important African-American Characters, commenting that "Since 1981, James Reynolds' top cop has provided the (rarely heeded) voice of reason in Salem as well as a counterpoint to the madness that's forever swirling around him. Don't get sucked in, Abe! Don't!"
