= Tina Andrews =

American actress, television producer, screenwriter, author and playwright

- Born: Chicago, Illinois, U.S.
- Education: New York University
- Occupations: Actress; television producer; author; playwright
- Years active: 1971–present
- Known for: Valerie Grant – Days of Our Lives; Aurelia – Roots
- Spouse: Stephen Gaines
- Website: www.tinaandrews.com

Tina Andrews is an American actress, television producer, screenwriter, author and playwright. She played Valerie Grant in the series Days of Our Lives from 1975 until 1977.

Andrews also wrote the TV miniseries Sally Hemings: An American Scandal, which was the first time that the relationship between Thomas Jefferson and Sally Hemings had been explored on TV. In 2001, Andrews was the first African American to win the Writers Guild of America award for Original Long Form, for her script for this miniseries.

== Biography ==
=== Early life and education ===
Andrews is one of two children of Eloyce and George Andrews in Chicago, Illinois. Andrews attended Harlan Community Academy High School, where she participated in Modern Dance, Student Council and Drama Club. After graduating high school in 1969, Andrews studied at New York University, majoring in Drama.

=== Career ===
==== Acting ====
Andrews spent many years acting in such series as Days of Our Lives, where she originated the role of Valerie Grant from 1975 to 1977. Her character was part of the first interracial romance shown on daytime television. Thereafter, Andrews played Angie Wheeler in The Sanford Arms. She also acted in the TV miniseries Roots (1977) as Aurelia, the girlfriend of the character Kunta Kinte. From this role, she met and became professional partners with Alex Haley, the author of the book on which it was based and the screenplay for the series. Haley hired Andrews to work with him on the miniseries Alex Haley's Great Men of African Descent. Andrews portrayed Valerie on Falcon Crest in 1983 and Josie in the television movie Born Innocent. Andrews' had guest appearances as characters on many shows, including The Odd Couple, Love Story, Sanford and Son, Good Times and The Brady Bunch. She also performed in films such as Conrack and Carny.

==== Writing ====
Andrews had been long interested in the story of Sally Hemings and Thomas Jefferson. She wrote the play The Mistress of Monticello, which was produced in Chicago in 1985 to good notices. About 10 years later, Craig Anderson started working with Andrews on developing it as a script for TV. Her play was produced in staged readings at the Southampton Cultural Center in February 2013.

Andrews worked on the Hemings project for nearly 16 years. Craig Anderson had optioned the rights to historian Fawn McKay Brodie's 1974 biography of Jefferson, which had explored the possibility of the long-rumored relationship with Hemings. She concluded that they did have a liaison and children. While Andrews was working on her script, a DNA study in 1998 demonstrated a match between the male lines of descendants of Hemings and Jefferson, which shifted the consensus of major historians of Jefferson, such as Joseph Ellis. He announced that he believed that Jefferson had a long-term relationship with Hemings and fathered all her children. Andrews completed her script, and the team took it to production. In 2000, CBS aired Sally Hemings: An American Scandal. It was directed by Charles Haid and starred Carmen Ejogo as Hemings and Sam Neill as Jefferson.

Andrews also wrote the CBS miniseries 'Jackie Bouvier Kennedy Onassis', and the screenplay for the movie Why Do Fools Fall in Love (1998). In 2019, Andrews joined other WGA writers in firing their agents as part of the WGA's stand against the ATA and the practice of packaging.

==== Literary works ====
Following the production of the miniseries in 2000, Andrews published the non-fiction book Sally Hemings: An American Scandal: The Struggle to Tell the Controversial Truth (2001). It recounts her work over 16 years to bring Hemings' story to a larger audience. The book was published by Malibu Press. She wrote an essay for The First Time I Got Paid for It: Writers Tales from the Hollywood Trenches (2002). Andrews novel The Hollywood Dolls (2009) was published by Malibu Press.

Andrews is the author of 'Awop Bop Aloo Mop: Little Richard, A Life of Sex, Drugs, Rock & Roll and Religion' (Malibu Press); and the historical novel 'Princess Sarah: Queen Victoria's African Goddaughter' (Malibu Press). Additioally, Andrews is also the author of Charlotte Sophia: Myth, Madness, and the Moor (2010), a historical novel about Charlotte of Mecklenburg, wife of King George III of Great Britain. A paperback edition was published in 2013. Andrews explores the life of the queen, building on a theory that she had a black ancestor in the 13th century. Andrews adapted the Charlotte novel as a play titled Buckingham, which premiered at the Southampton Cultural Center in May 2013. An updated edition of the book entitled Queen Charlotte Sophia: A Royal Affair was acquired for publication by Jacaranda Books in 2023.

== Awards and nominations ==
In 1999, Andrews received a nomination at the Acapulco Black Film Festival for Best Screenplay for the 1998 movie Why Do Fools Fall in Love. In 2001, Andrews was the first African American to win the Writers Guild of America award for Original Long Form for her script for the 2000 miniseries Sally Hemings: An American Scandal. She shared the award with Phil Alden Robinson and Stanley Weiser, who won for the 2000 movie Freedom Song. That year, Andrews also won the NAACP Image Award for Outstanding TV Movie, Miniseries or Special. In 2002, Andrews won two awards for her book about developing the Hemings story as a TV miniseries: the NAACP Image Award for Outstanding Achievement in Literary Nonfiction and the Literary Award of Excellence from the Memphis Black Writers Conference. In 2003, Andrews won the MIB/Prism Filmmaker Image Award, and she received a proclamation from the City Council of New York that year.
