= Gregg Marx =

American actor

- Born: April 3, 1955 (age 71); Hollywood, California, U.S.
- Occupation: Actor
- Relatives: Gummo Marx (grandfather)

Gregg Marx (born April 3, 1955) is an American actor known mainly for his work on daytime soap operas.

He first played the role of David Banning on Days of Our Lives from 1981 to 1983. He then moved to As the World Turns where he portrayed Tom Hughes, from December 7, 1984 to 1987. Marx won the Daytime Emmy Award for Outstanding Supporting Actor in a Drama Series at the 14th Daytime Emmy Awards in 1987.

As a cabaret performer, he has performed at Los Angeles venues such as Hollywood Cinegrill, Masquers Cabaret, The Gardenia, and Feinstein's At The Cinegrill, as well as in New York at Danny's Skylight Room, Maggiano's at The Grove and II Moro Supper Club.

He voiced a fictional commercial in an episode of Two and a Half Men in 2007.

Gregg Marx is a grandson of Gummo Marx of the Marx Brothers.
