= James Reynolds (actor) =

American actor (born 1946)

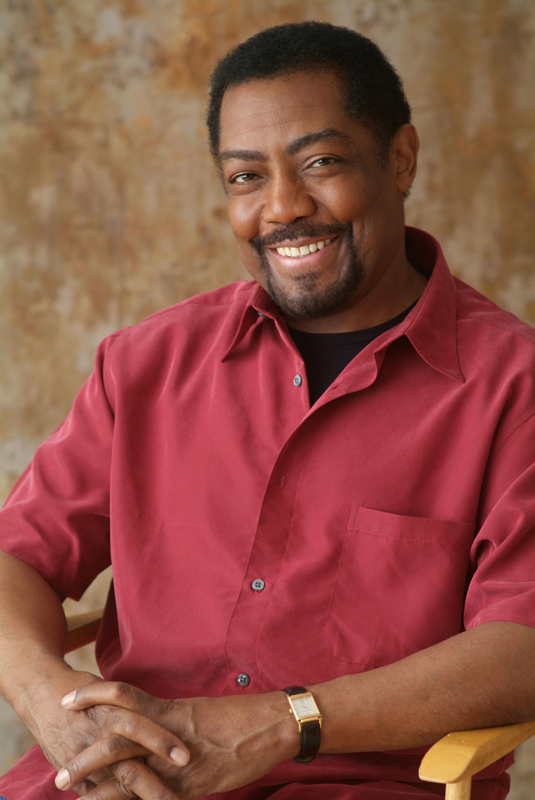
- Born: August 10, 1946 (age 79); Oskaloosa, Kansas, U.S.
- Occupation: Actor
- Years active: 1974–present
- Spouses: Laura Toffenetti (m. 1978; div. 1984) Lissa Layng (m. 1985)
- Children: 1

James Reynolds (born August 10, 1946) is an American television actor. He is best known for portraying the role of Abe Carver on Days of Our Lives, for which he won the Daytime Emmy Award for Outstanding Lead Actor in a Drama Series in 2018.

== Early life ==
Reynolds was born in Oskaloosa, Kansas on August 10, 1946. At Oskaloosa High School (Kansas), he was an All-State football player..

Following graduation from high school, Reynolds joined the Marines. After boot camp he was assigned to the Information Service Office where, first stationed in Hawaii, he became a reporter for the service newspaper, the Windward Marine. Later, he was sent to Vietnam and served for almost a year with a variety of units in and around Chu Lai, adding battlefield reporting to his combat duties.

Returning to the States, Reynolds enrolled in Topeka's Washburn University, majoring in prelaw and journalism. Advised that the best place on campus to meet girls was the theater department, he began auditioning and performing in plays. In addition to his improved social life, Reynolds reaped another unexpected benefit—he discovered a passion for acting. He went on to appear not only in regular campus productions of musicals and dramatic plays, but with local theater groups as well.

== Career ==
Reynolds originated the character of Abe Carver on the NBC dramatic serial Days of Our Lives in 1981, which he has played since then. He has been on contract with the show since 1981 with only two short breaks in 1991 and 2003 where he still appeared as a recurring character. He is the only actor to play the role of Abe Carver. Before appearing on Days of Our Lives, he had previously appeared in the 1979 CBS series Time Express.

After serving as stalwart police commander Abe Carver on Days of our Lives for nine years, Reynolds moved to the new series, Generations in 1991 to play powerful business tycoon Henry Marshall, replacing actor Taurean Blacque in the role. He was rewarded for his powerful portrayal with an Emmy nomination as Outstanding Lead Actor in a Drama Series. With the subsequent demise of that series, Reynolds was invited to return to Days where his character was promoted in rank to Chief and named the top law enforcement official in Salem, the fictional community which is home to Days of our Lives.

== Personal life ==
One of Reynolds' greatest honors is being named to the Kansas Historical Society's list of famous Kansans, a list that includes such notables as President Dwight Eisenhower, Amelia Earhart, Langston Hughes, Barry Sanders, and many others.

He was married to Laura Toffenetti on September 30, 1978. They welcomed their son Jed, on October 27, 1979. After four years of marriage, the couple separated, and divorced on July 19, 1984. Reynolds married his second wife, Lissa Layng on December 21, 1985.

== Feature filmography ==
- C.H.O.M.P.S. (1979)
- The Magic of Lassie (1978)
- Fun with Dick and Jane (1977)
- Mr. Majestyk (1974)
- Days of Our Lives (1981–present)
- Inhumanoids (1986)
- Generations (1990–1991)

== Awards and nominations ==
List of awards and nominations for James Reynolds
Year	Award	Category	Work	Result	Ref.
1991	Daytime Emmy Award	Outstanding Lead Actor in a Drama Series	Generations	Nominated	
2002	NAACP Image Award	Outstanding Actor in a Daytime Drama Series	Days of Our Lives	Nominated	
2004	Daytime Emmy Award	Outstanding Supporting Actor in a Drama Series	Days of Our Lives	Nominated	
2004	NAACP Image Award	Outstanding Actor in a Daytime Drama Series	Days of Our Lives	Nominated	
2007	NAACP Image Award	Outstanding Actor in a Daytime Drama Series	Days of Our Lives	Nominated	
2012	NAACP Image Award	Outstanding Actor in a Daytime Drama Series	Days of Our Lives	Nominated	
2013	NAACP Image Award	Outstanding Actor in a Daytime Drama Series	Days of Our Lives	Nominated	
2017	Daytime Emmy Award	Outstanding Supporting Actor in a Drama Series	Days of Our Lives	Nominated	
2018	Daytime Emmy Award	Outstanding Lead Actor in a Drama Series	Days of Our Lives	Won	
2022	Daytime Emmy Award	Outstanding Lead Actor in a Drama Series	Days of Our Lives	Nominated	
