= Susan Seaforth Hayes =

American actress (born 1943)

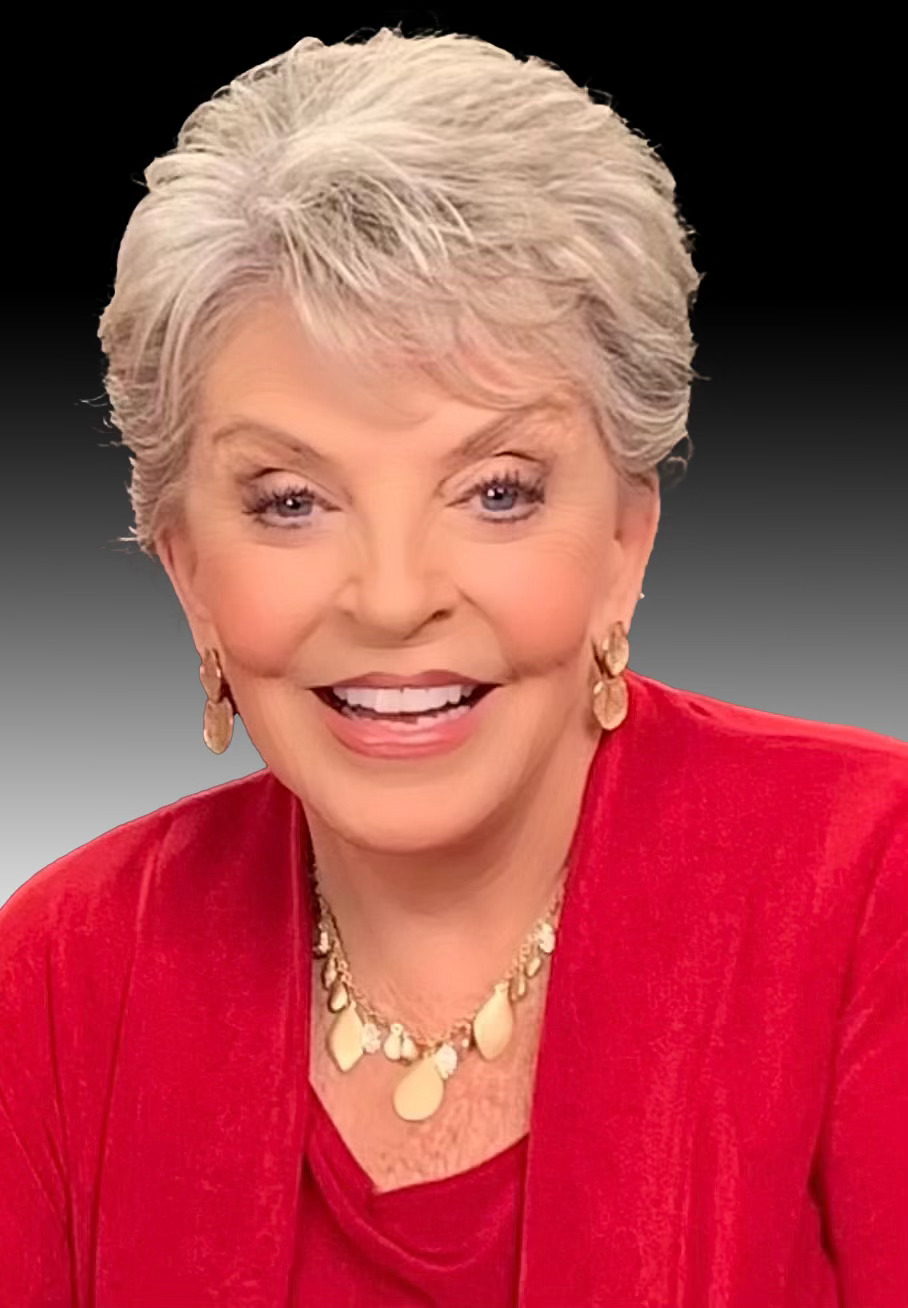
- Seaforth Hayes in 2022
- Born: Susan Seabold; July 11, 1943 (age 83); Oakland, California, U.S.
- Occupation: Actress
- Years active: 1953–present
- Spouse: Bill Hayes (m. 1974; died 2024)

Susan Seaforth Hayes (born Susan Seabold; July 11, 1943) is an American television actress. She is best known for her portrayal of Julie Williams on the NBC drama Days of Our Lives, and her intermittent portrayal of Joanna Manning on the CBS daytime drama The Young and the Restless. She began playing the role of Julie on Days of Our Lives in 1968, and is the only actress to appear on the show for all seven decades it has been on the air. Seaforth Hayes still regularly appears on Days as Julie.

== Career ==
Susan Seaforth grew up in Hollywood, where she was active in theater as a teenager. Her mother, Elizabeth Harrower (1918–2003), was an actress and screenwriter who eventually became a part of the writing teams of The Young and the Restless and Days of Our Lives. Her father, Harry Seabold, lived with his bride for 90 days during World War II, through his basic training near Oklahoma City. He shipped out after his daughter was conceived and remained overseas for thirty-three months; during this time, Harrower returned to her family home in Berkeley.

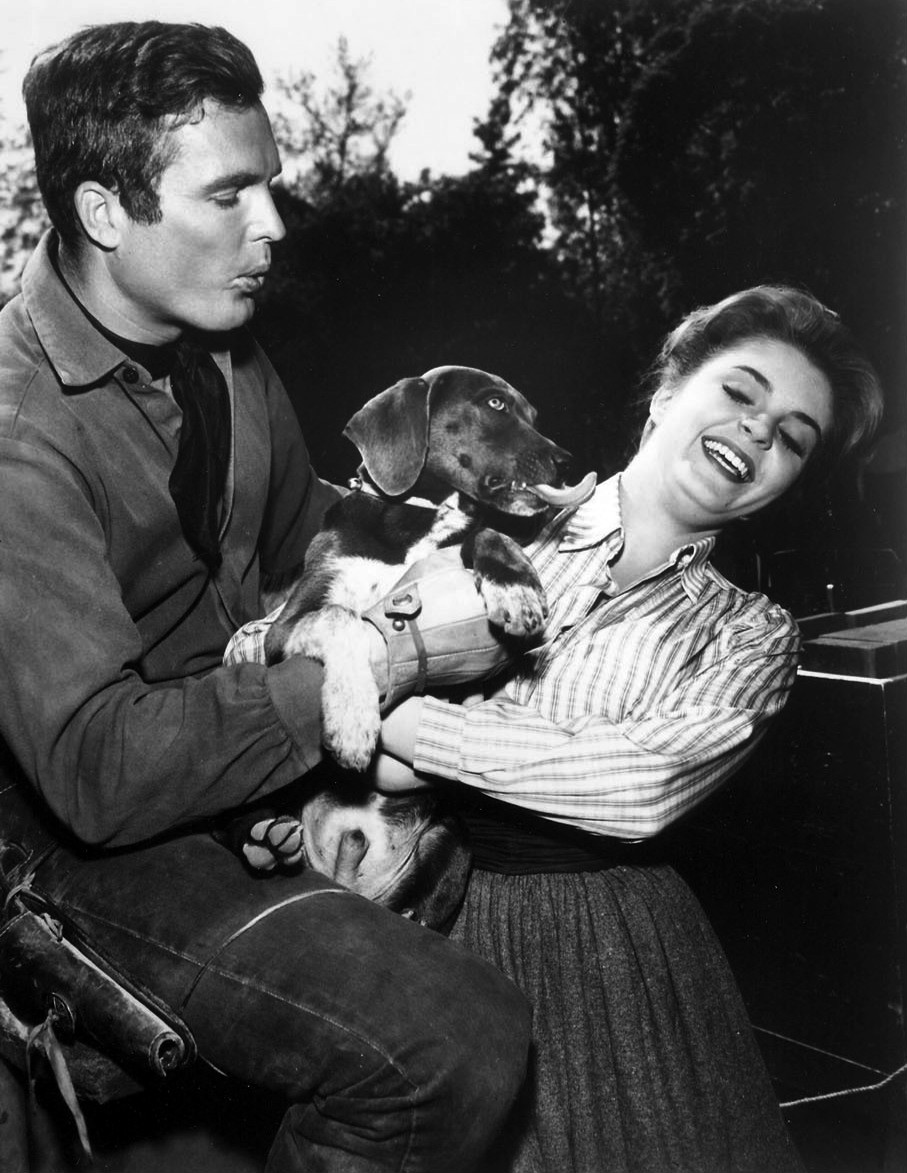
Hayes and Ty Hardin, 1962

Seaforth Hayes had a number of featured roles on prime-time television in the 1960s, 1970s, and 1980s. Seaforth appeared in the TV series Cheyenne in the episode, "The Bad Penny", portraying a young murderer avenging the hanging of her outlaw father. She appeared as Martha Otis, the wife of Jim Otis (Gil Peterson) in 1967 in Death Valley Days. She guest starred in National Velvet, The Fugitive, The Man from U.N.C.L.E., My Three Sons, Emergency!, Adam-12, Dragnet, and Matlock. She made a guest appearance on Perry Mason in 1962 as title character Helen Gregory in "The Case of the Stand-in Sister." In the mid-1960s, she appeared on General Hospital as the flirtatious Dorothy Bradley (1964). She gave a moving performance as the expectant Holly, who was fleeing her outlaw husband while falling in love with Dev, his bounty hunter played by Dennis Hopper, on "Bonanza" S5 E31 "The Dark Past", which aired in May 1964. She also appeared in Wagon Train S8E14, ‘The Echo Pass Story.’ She then appeared on The Young Marrieds as Carol West (1965). In 1968, she appeared in Season 4, Episode 12, of The Wild Wild West as Delilah (The Night of Miguelito’s Revenge). She played opposite Michael Dunn as Dr. Loveless.

She is best-known for her work on the daytime soap opera Days of Our Lives in the role of Julie Olson Williams, which she played continuously from 1968 to 1984 and again from 1990 to 1993, with recurring appearances in 1994 and 1996. Since 1999, she has appeared on the show in a recurring capacity, often doing double duty between Days and Y&R, in one case appearing on both shows on the very same day, a feat possible because of their different shooting and airing schedules.

She is the only actress to appear on Days of Our Lives in all seven decades that it has been in production. In between appearances, she starred from November 1984 to May 1989 as Joanna Manning, mother to Tracey E. Bregman's character, Lauren Fenmore, on The Young and the Restless and as District Attorney Patricia Steele on Sunset Beach in that show's final months on the air.

The role of Stephanie Forrester on The Bold and the Beautiful was created for her by former Days headwriter William J. Bell. When she turned it down, her former Days costar Susan Flannery took the role. However, when the character of Lauren Fenmore crossed over, Seaforth Hayes did reprise her role of Joanna Manning on that show for one episode in 2003, and made several return appearances as that character on Y&R, as Lauren's storyline required the character to be there.

Most recently, Seaforth Hayes made a cameo appearance in a music video for Chip Chocolate's "Cookie Dance" as Mrs. Fields.

For her work on Days, Seaforth Hayes has received four Daytime Emmy Award nominations for Outstanding Lead Actress in a Drama Series, in 1975, 1976, 1978, and 1979; and two nominations for Outstanding Supporting Actress in a Drama Series, in 2018, and 2020. On April 29, 2018, the National Academy of Television Arts & Sciences presented Bill Hayes and Susan Seaforth Hayes with Lifetime Achievement Awards at the 45th Annual Daytime Emmy Awards. She was voted Best Actress in Daytime TV's Annual Reader's Poll in 1976, 1977, and 1978. Additionally, in 1977, she won two Soapy Awards for Actress of the Year and Favorite Heroine. She was awarded Photoplay Gold Medal Awards in 1977 and 1978, for Favorite Daytime Female Star. She earned a degree in history from L.A's City College, and the stack of books at her deskside reflects an intense interest in the American West and diverse Native American cultures. Seaforth Hayes has lectured at universities in Los Angeles and Boston.

Her onscreen and real-life romance with co-star Bill Hayes (Doug Williams) was widely covered by both the soap opera magazines and the mainstream press (they were married from 1974 until Hayes' death in 2024). The characters of Doug and Julie were Days of our Lives', as well as daytime TV's, first supercouple, and are widely believed to be the first supercouple on the American daytime serials. Their appearance together on the January 12, 1976 cover of Time was the only time daytime actors have appeared there. They also made an appearance on Password Plus in 1979.

In 2005, she and Hayes published their joint autobiography, Like Sands Through the Hourglass.

== Major roles ==
- Julie Olson Williams on Days of Our Lives
  - (1968–1984, 1990–1993) [contract]
  - (1993–1994, 1996) [guest stints]
  - (1999–present) [recurring]
- Delilah on The Wild Wild West
  - (1968, credited as Susan Seaforth)
- Joanna Manning on The Young and the Restless
  - (1984–1989) [contract]
  - (2005–2007, 2010) [guest stints]
- Joanna Manning on The Bold and the Beautiful
  - (2003, 2005) [guest stints]
- D.A. Patricia Steele on Sunset Beach
  - (1999) [recurring]

== Personal life ==
Susan Seaforth Hayes's roots are in the Kopp family from Germany, which hails from Oberemmel, a district of Konz in the state of Rhineland-Palatinate. For many years, she and her mother lived in the Alvarado Terrace Historic District of Los Angeles.

== Awards and nominations ==
List of acting awards and nominations
Year	Award	Category	Title	Result	Ref.
1975	Daytime Emmy Award	Outstanding Lead Actress in a Drama Series	Days of Our Lives	Nominated	
1976	Daytime Emmy Award	Outstanding Lead Actress in a Drama Series	Days of Our Lives	Nominated	
1978	Daytime Emmy Award	Outstanding Lead Actress in a Drama Series	Days of Our Lives	Nominated	
1977	Soapy Awards	Outstanding Actress	Days of Our Lives	Won	
1977	Soapy Awards	Favourite Heroine	Days of Our Lives	Won	
1979	Daytime Emmy Award	Outstanding Lead Actress in a Drama Series	Days of Our Lives	Nominated	
2018	Daytime Emmy Award	Lifetime Achievement Award (shared with Bill Hayes)	Herself	Won	
2018	Daytime Emmy Award	Outstanding Supporting Actress in a Drama Series	Days of Our Lives	Nominated	
2020	Daytime Emmy Award	Outstanding Supporting Actress in a Drama Series	Days of Our Lives	Nominated	

== See also ==
- Supercouple
