= Doug Williams (Days of Our Lives) =

Fictional character

- Days of our Lives character
- Portrayed by: Bill Hayes
- Duration: 1970–1984; 1986–1987; 1993–1996; 1999–2024
- First appearance: February 9, 1970
- Last appearance: July 11, 2024
- Created by: William J. Bell
- Introduced by: Betty Corday
In-universe information
- Other names: Brent Douglas (birth name)
- Occupation: Retired; Owner of Doug's Place; Singer at Sergio's; Mayor of Salem; Con-man
- Half-brothers: Byron Carmichael
- Spouse: Kim Douglas (until 1972); Addie Horton (1972–1974); Julie Olson Williams (1976–1979, 1981–1986, 1994–2024); Lee DuMonde (1979–1980)
- Children: Hope Williams; Douglas LeClaire
- Stepsons: David Banning
- Grandchildren: Shawn-Douglas Brady; Zack Brady; Ciara Brady; Doug Williams III

Doug Williams is a fictional character on the American soap opera Days of Our Lives, portrayed by Bill Hayes from 1970 until 2024. After 1999, Hayes made recurring appearances as Doug, notably airing during the holiday seasons, with his final appearance on July 11, 2024, six months after his death on January 12, 2024.

== Reception ==
For his portrayal of Doug Williams, Bill Hayes was given the Daytime Emmy Lifetime Achievement Award in 2018. Hayes was also nominated for Emmy Awards for Outstanding Actor in a Daytime Drama Series in 1975 and 1976. In 2020, Charlie Mason from Soaps She Knows placed Doug at #15 on a list of the 35 most memorable characters from Days of Our Lives, saying "The erstwhile Brent Douglas has come a long way from his humble beginnings. The smooth-talking con man became a good guy — so good, in fact, that viewers deemed him worthy of the heroine at No. 8 [Julie Olson]".

== See also ==
- Doug and Julie Williams
