= List of awards and nominations received by Days of Our Lives =

Days of Our Lives is an American daytime television soap opera created by Ted and Betty Corday. It first aired on NBC on November 8, 1965. The following is a list of awards and nominations the show's crew and cast have received.

== Daytime Emmy Awards ==
=== Outstanding Drama Series ===
Year	Nominee	Result	Ref
1974	Days of Our Lives	Nominated	
1975	Days of Our Lives	Nominated	
1976	Days of Our Lives	Nominated	
1977	Days of Our Lives	Nominated	
1978	Days of Our Lives	Won	
1979	Days of Our Lives	Nominated	
1983	Days of Our Lives	Nominated	
1984	Days of Our Lives	Nominated	
1985	Days of Our Lives	Nominated	
1995	Days of Our Lives	Nominated	
1996	Days of Our Lives	Nominated	
1997	Days of Our Lives	Nominated	
1998	Days of Our Lives	Nominated	
1999	Days of Our Lives	Nominated	
2009	Days of Our Lives	Nominated	
2012	Days of Our Lives	Nominated	
2013	Days of Our Lives	Won	
2014	Days of Our Lives	Nominated	
2015	Days of Our Lives	Won	
2016	Days of Our Lives	Nominated	
2017	Days of Our Lives	Nominated	
2018	Days of Our Lives	Won	
2019	Days of Our Lives	Nominated	
2020	Days of Our Lives	Nominated	
2021	Days of Our Lives	Nominated	
2022	Days of Our Lives	Nominated	
2022	Days of Our Lives: Beyond Salem	Nominated	
2023	Days of Our Lives	Nominated	
2024	Days of Our Lives	Nominated	
2025	Days of Our Lives	Nominated	

=== Outstanding Lead Actor in a Drama Series ===
Year	Nominee	Result	Ref
1974	Macdonald Carey (Tom Horton)	Won	
1975	Macdonald Carey (Tom Horton)	Won	
1975	Bill Hayes (Doug Williams)	Nominated	
1976	Macdonald Carey (Tom Horton)	Nominated	
1976	Bill Hayes (Doug Williams)	Nominated	
1979	Jed Allan (Don Craig)	Nominated	
1979	John Clarke (Mickey Horton)	Nominated	
1988	Stephen Nichols (Steve "Patch" Johnson)	Nominated	
2008	Thaao Penghlis (Tony DiMera)	Nominated	
2009	Peter Reckell (Bo Brady)	Nominated	
2010	James Scott (EJ DiMera)	Nominated	
2011	James Scott (EJ DiMera)	Nominated	
2017	Billy Flynn (Chad DiMera)	Nominated	
2017	Vincent Irizarry (Deimos Kiriakis)	Nominated	
2018	James Reynolds (Abe Carver)	Won	
2019	Billy Flynn (Chad DiMera)	Nominated	
2019	Tyler Christopher (Stefan DiMera)	Nominated	
2020	Thaao Penghlis (Tony DiMera)	Nominated	
2021	Wally Kurth (Justin Kiriakis)	Nominated	
2022	Eric Martsolf (Brady Black)	Nominated	
2022	James Reynolds (Abe Carver)	Nominated	
2023	Billy Flynn (Chad DiMera)	Nominated	
2024	Eric Martsolf (Brady Black)	Nominated	
2025	Paul Telfer (Xander Kiriakis)	Won	
2025	Eric Martsolf (Brady Black)	Nominated	
2025	Greg Rikaart (Leo Stark)	Nominated	

=== Outstanding Lead Actress in a Drama Series ===
Year	Nominee	Result	Ref
1975	Susan Flannery (Laura Horton)	Won	
1975	Susan Seaforth (Julie Williams)	Nominated	
1976	Susan Seaforth (Julie Williams)	Nominated	
1978	Susan Seaforth Hayes (Julie Williams)	Nominated	
1979	Susan Seaforth Hayes (Julie Williams)	Nominated	
1984	Deidre Hall (Marlena Evans)	Nominated	
1985	Deidre Hall (Marlena Evans)	Nominated	
1986	Peggy McCay (Caroline Brady)	Nominated	
1987	Frances Reid (Alice Horton)	Nominated	
1998	Eileen Davidson (Kristen Blake)	Nominated	
2012	Crystal Chappell (Dr. Carly Manning)	Nominated	
2013	Peggy McCay (Caroline Brady)	Nominated	
2014	Eileen Davidson (Kristen DiMera)	Won	
2014	Arianne Zucker (Nicole Walker)	Nominated	
2015	Peggy McCay (Caroline Brady)	Nominated	
2015	Alison Sweeney (Sami Brady DiMera)	Nominated	
2016	Kassie DePaiva (Eve Donovan)	Nominated	
2016	Mary Beth Evans (Kayla Brady)	Won	
2018	Marci Miller (Abigail Deveraux)	Nominated	
2019	Marci Miller (Abigail Deveraux)	Nominated	
2020	Arianne Zucker (Nicole Walker)	Nominated	
2022	Marci Miller (Abigail DiMera)	Nominated	
2022	Arianne Zucker (Nicole Walker)	Nominated	
2024	Tamara Braun (Ava Vitali)	Nominated	

=== Outstanding Supporting Actor in a Drama Series ===
Year	Nominee	Result	Ref
1979	Joseph Gallison (Neil Curtis)	Nominated	
1989	Joseph Campanella (Harper Deveraux)	Nominated	
2004	James Reynolds (Abe Carver)	Nominated	
2013	Matthew Ashford (Jack Deveraux)	Nominated	
2014	Eric Martsolf (Brady Black)	Won	
2017	John Aniston (Victor Kiriakis)	Nominated	
2017	James Reynolds (Abe Carver)	Nominated	
2018	Chandler Massey (Will Horton)	Nominated	
2018	Greg Vaughan (Eric Brady)	Won	
2019	Eric Martsolf (Brady Black)	Nominated	
2019	Greg Rikaart (Leo Stark)	Nominated	
2020	Wally Kurth (Justin Kiriakis)	Nominated	
2020	Chandler Massey (Will Horton)	Nominated	
2020	Paul Telfer (Xander Kiriakis)	Nominated	
2023	Daniel Feuerriegel (EJ DiMera)	Nominated	
2024	Wally Kurth (Justin Kiriakis)	Nominated	
2025	Blake Berris (Everett Lynch)	Nominated	

=== Outstanding Supporting Actress in a Drama Series ===
Year	Nominee	Result	Ref
1979	Suzanne Rogers (Maggie Horton)	Won	
1979	Frances Reid (Alice Horton)	Nominated	
1980	Deidre Hall (Marlena Evans)	Nominated	
1986	Leann Hunley (Anna DiMera)	Won	
1987	Peggy McCay (Caroline Brady)	Nominated	
1988	Arleen Sorkin (Calliope Jones)	Nominated	
1989	Jane Elliot (Anjelica Deveraux)	Nominated	
1989	Arleen Sorkin (Calliope Jones)	Nominated	
2000	Patrika Darbo (Nancy Wesley)	Nominated	
2008	Judi Evans (Bonnie Lockhart/Adrienne Johnson)	Nominated	
2009	Tamara Braun (Ava Vitali)	Won	
2010	Arianne Zucker (Nicole Walker)	Nominated	
2013	Arianne Zucker (Nicole Walker)	Nominated	
2016	Peggy McCay (Caroline Brady)	Nominated	
2016	Melissa Reeves (Jennifer Horton)	Nominated	
2017	Kate Mansi (Abigail Deveraux)	Won	
2018	Susan Seaforth Hayes (Julie Williams)	Nominated	
2019	Kassie DePaiva (Eve Donovan)	Nominated	
2019	Linsey Godfrey (Sarah Horton)	Nominated	
2019	Martha Madison (Belle Black)	Nominated	
2020	Susan Seaforth Hayes (Julie Williams)	Nominated	
2021	Tamara Braun (Ava Vitali)	Nominated	
2022	Stacy Haiduk (Kristen DiMera)	Nominated	
2023	Stacy Haiduk (Kristen DiMera)	Nominated	
2024	Linsey Godfrey (Sarah Horton)	Nominated	
2024	Emily O'Brien as Gwen Rizczech	Nominated	
2025	Linsey Godfrey (Sarah Horton)	Nominated	
2025	Emily O'Brien (Theresa Donovan)	Nominated	

=== Outstanding Younger Actor in a Drama Series ===
Year	Nominee	Result	Ref
1987	Billy Warlock (Frankie Brady)	Nominated	
1988	Billy Warlock (Frankie Brady)	Won	
1989	Darrell Utley (Benjy Hawk)	Nominated	
1998	Jensen Ackles (Eric Brady)	Nominated	
1999	Jensen Ackles (Eric Brady)	Nominated	
2000	Jensen Ackles (Eric Brady)	Nominated	
2003	Kyle Lowder (Brady Black)	Nominated	
2008	Darin Brooks (Max Brady)	Nominated	
2009	Darin Brooks (Max Brady)	Won	
2009	Blake Berris (Nick Fallon)	Nominated	
2010	Dylan Patton (Will Horton)	Nominated	
2011	Chandler Massey (Will Horton)	Nominated	
2012	Chandler Massey (Will Horton)	Won	
2013	Chandler Massey (Will Horton)	Won	
2013	Freddie Smith (Sonny Kiriakis)	Nominated	
2014	Chandler Massey (Will Horton)	Won	
2015	Freddie Smith (Sonny Kiriakis)	Won	
2017	James Lastovic (Joey Johnson)	Nominated	
2018	Lucas Adams (Tripp Dalton)	Nominated	
2018	Casey Moss (JJ Deveraux)	Nominated	
2019	Lucas Adams (Tripp Dalton)	Nominated	
2019	Kyler Pettis (Theo Carver)	Won	
2023	Cary Christhopher (Thomas DiMera)	Nominated	

=== Outstanding Younger Actress in a Drama Series ===
Year	Nominee	Result	Ref
1985	Kristian Alfonso (Hope Williams)	Nominated	
1985	Lisa Trusel (Melissa Anderson)	Nominated	
1990	Charlotte Ross (Eve Donovan)	Nominated	
1991	Charlotte Ross (Eve Donovan)	Nominated	
1992	Melissa Reeves (Jennifer Horton)	Nominated	
1997	Christie Clark (Carrie Brady)	Nominated	
1998	Christie Clark (Carrie Brady)	Nominated	
2008	Rachel Melvin (Chelsea Brady)	Nominated	
2009	Rachel Melvin (Chelsea Brady)	Nominated	
2010	Molly Burnett (Melanie Layton)	Nominated	
2010	Shelley Hennig (Stephanie Johnson)	Nominated	
2012	Molly Burnett (Melanie Layton)	Nominated	
2012	Shelley Hennig (Stephanie Johnson)	Nominated	
2015	Camila Banus (Gabi Hernandez)	Nominated	
2016	True O'Brien (Paige Larson)	Won	
2018	Olivia Rose Keegan (Claire Brady)	Nominated	
2019	Olivia Rose Keegan (Claire Brady)	Nominated	
2019	Victoria Konefal (Ciara Brady)	Nominated	
2020	Olivia Rose Keegan (Claire Brady)	Won	
2020	Thia Megia Haley Chen	Nominated	
2021	Victoria Konefal (Ciara Brady)	Won	
2022	Lindsay Arnold (Allie Horton)	Nominated	

=== Outstanding Emerging Talent in a Daytime Drama Series ===
Year	Nominee	Result	Ref
2025	AnnaLynne McCord (Cat Greene)	Nominated	
2025	Ashley Puzemis (Holly Jonas)	Nominated	

=== Outstanding Drama Series Writing Team ===
Year	Nominee	Result	Ref
1975	Days of Our Lives	Nominated	
1976	Days of Our Lives	Won	
1977	Days of Our Lives	Nominated	
1978	Days of Our Lives	Nominated	
1979	Days of Our Lives	Nominated	
1994	Days of Our Lives	Nominated	
1997	Days of Our Lives	Nominated	
1998	Days of Our Lives	Nominated	
1999	Days of Our Lives	Nominated	
2011	Days of Our Lives	Nominated	
2012	Days of Our Lives	Won	
2014	Days of Our Lives	Nominated	
2015	Days of Our Lives	Nominated	
2017	Days of Our Lives	Nominated	
2018	Days of Our Lives	Won	
2019	Days of Our Lives	Nominated	
2020	Days of Our Lives	Nominated	
2022	Days of Our Lives	Won	
2023	Days of Our Lives	Nominated	
2023	Beyond Salem: Chapter Two	Nominated	
2024	Days of Our Lives	Nominated	
2025	Days of Our Lives	Nominated	

=== Other Daytime Emmy awards ===
Year	Category	Nominee	Result	Ref
1974	Best Individual Director for a Drama Series	Wes Kenney	Won	
1974	Outstanding Sound Mixing for a Drama Series	Days of Our Lives	Won	
1980	Outstanding Cameo Appearance in a Daytime Drama Series	Hugh McPhillips (Hugh Pearson)	Won	
1988	Outstanding Make-Up for a Drama Series	Days of Our Lives	Won	
1988	Outstanding Hairstyling for a Drama Series	Days of Our Lives	Won	
1988	Outstanding Costume Design for a Drama Series	Days of Our Lives	Won	
1990	Outstanding Music Direction for a Drama Series	Days of Our Lives	Won	
1991	Outstanding Make-Up for a Drama Series	Days of Our Lives	Won	
1992	Outstanding Make-Up for a Drama Series	Days of Our Lives	Won	
1995	Outstanding Hairstyling for a Drama Series	Days of Our Lives	Won	
1997	Outstanding Make-Up for a Drama Series	Days of Our Lives	Won	
1997	Outstanding Hairstyling for a Drama Series	Days of Our Lives	Won	
1997	Outstanding Art Direction/Set Decoration/Scenic Design for a Drama Series	Days of Our Lives	Won	
1997	Outstanding Music Direction for a Drama Series	Days of Our Lives	Won	
1999	Outstanding Hairstyling for a Drama Series	Days of Our Lives	Won	
2004	Lifetime Achievement Award	John Clarke (Mickey Horton) and Frances Reid (Alice Horton)	Won	
2004	Outstanding Multiple Camera Editing for a Drama Series	Days of Our Lives	Won	
2007	Outstanding Multiple Camera Editing for a Drama Series	Days of Our Lives	Won	
2008	Outstanding Hairstyling for a Drama Series	Days of Our Lives	Won	
2012	Outstanding Stunt Coordination	Days of Our Lives	Won	
2012	Outstanding Make-Up for a Drama Series	Days of Our Lives	Won	
2013	Outstanding Sound Mixing for a Drama Series	Days of Our Lives	Won	
2013	Outstanding Stunt Coordination	Days of Our Lives	Won	
2013	Outstanding Set Decoration for a Drama Series	Days of Our Lives	Nominated	
2013	Outstanding Casting for a Drama Series	Days of Our Lives	Nominated	
2013	Outstanding Costume Design for a Drama Series	Days of Our Lives	Nominated	
2013	Outstanding Hairstyling for a Drama Series	Days of Our Lives	Nominated	
2013	Outstanding Make-Up for a Drama Series	Days of Our Lives	Nominated	
2015	Outstanding Art Direction/Set Decoration/Scenic Design for a Drama Series	Days of Our Lives	Won	
2015	Outstanding Multiple Camera Editing for a Drama Series	Days of Our Lives	Won	
2015	Outstanding Live and Direct to Tape Sound Mixing for a Drama Series	Days of Our Lives	Won	
2015	Outstanding Casting Director for a Drama Series	Marnie Saitta for Days of Our Lives	Nominated	
2015	Outstanding Costume Design for a Drama Series	Days of Our Lives	Nominated	
2015	Outstanding Hairstyling for a Drama Series	Days of Our Lives	Nominated	
2015	Outstanding Makeup for a Drama Series	Days of Our Lives	Nominated	
2015	Outstanding Music Direction and Composition for a Drama Series	Days of Our Lives	Nominated	
2015	Outstanding Technical Team for a Drama Series	Days of Our Lives	Nominated	
2016	Outstanding Music Direction and Composition for a Drama Series	Days of Our Lives	Won	
2017	Outstanding Casting for a Drama Series	Days of Our Lives	Won	
2017	Outstanding Live and Direct to Tape Sound Mixing for a Drama Series	Days of Our Lives	Won	
2017	Outstanding Music Direction and Composition for a Drama Series	Days of Our Lives	Won	
2017	Outstanding Original Song for a Drama Series	Days of Our Lives	Won	
2021	Outstanding Guest Performer in a Drama Series	Cady McClain (Jennifer Horton)	Won	
2024	Outstanding Guest Performer in a Drama Series	Dick Van Dyke (Mystery Man/Timothy Robicheaux)	Won	
2024	Outstanding Directing Team for a Daytime Drama Series	Days of Our Lives	Nominated	
2024	Outstanding Technical Direction, Camerawork, Video	Days of Our Lives	Nominated	
2024	Outstanding Casting	Marnie Saitta and Bob Lambert	Nominated	
2025	Outstanding Directing Team for a Daytime Drama Series	Days of Our Lives	Nominated	
2025	Outstanding Lighting Direction for a Series	David Meagher and Billy Yakes	Nominated	
2025	Outstanding Outstanding Casting	Marnie Saitta and Bob Lambert	Won	

== Directors Guild of America Awards ==
Year	Category	Nominee(s)	Result	Ref
1999	Outstanding Directorial Achievement in Daytime Serials	Herbet Stein and Roger W. Inman for Episode #8,557	Won	
2001	Outstanding Directorial Achievement in Daytime Serials	Randy Robbins for Episode #8,991	Nominated	
2005	Outstanding Directorial Achievement in Daytime Serials	Herbet Stein and Albert Alarr for Episode #10,090	Nominated	
2008	Outstanding Directorial Achievement in Daytime Serials	Noel Maxam for "This Is It" (Episode #10,763)	Nominated	
2012	Outstanding Directorial Achievement in Daytime Serials	Albert Alarr for Episode #11,895	Nominated	

== GLAAD Media Awards ==
Year	Category	Nominee	Result	Ref
2012	Outstanding Daily Drama	Days of Our Lives	Won	
2013	Outstanding Daily Drama	Days of Our Lives	Won	
2014	Outstanding Daily Drama	Days of Our Lives	Won	
2015	Outstanding Daily Drama	Days of Our Lives	Won	
2018	Outstanding Daily Drama	Days of Our Lives	Nominated	

== People's Choice Awards ==
Year	Category	Nominee	Result	Ref
1997	Favorite Daytime Serial	Days of Our Lives	Won	
1998	Favorite Daytime Serial	Days of Our Lives	Won	
2002	Favorite Daytime Serial	Days of Our Lives	Won	
2003	Favorite Daytime Serial	Days of Our Lives	Won	

== PRISM Awards ==
Year	Category	Nominee	Result	Ref
1999	TV Daytime Drama Series Continuing Storyline	Lucas and Maggie	Won	
2000	TV Daytime Drama Series Episode or Storyline	"Fetal Alcohol Syndrome" storyline	Won	
2012	Daytime Drama Series Storyline	Matthew Ashford for Jack Deveraux's post traumatic stress syndrome	Won	
2013	Daytime Drama Series Storyline	Peggy McCay for Caroline Brady's battle with Alzheimer's disease	Won	
2014	Daytime Drama Series Storyline	Eric Martsolf for Brady Black's drug and alcohol addiction	Won	

== Writers Guild of America Awards ==
=== Best Television Writing in a Daytime Drama ===
Year	Nominee(s)	Result	Ref
1988	Sheri Anderson, Leah Laiman, Anne M. Schoettle, Thom Racina, Shelly Moore, Dena Breshears, Richard J. Allen, Linda Campanelli, Maralyn Thoma, Michelle Poteet Lisanti, Peggy Schibi, Penina Spiegel, Ted Kubiak	Nominated	
1992	Anne M. Schoettle, Richard J. Allen, Gene Palumbo, Leah Laiman, Dena Higley, Marcia E. Greenlaw, Roberto Lollederman, Beth Milstein, Sheri Anderson, Michelle Poteet Lisanti, Mike Cohen, Maura Penders, Mary Le Donne, Penina Spiegel, Marlene Clark and Dwight D. Smith	Nominated	
1994	Maura Penders, James E. Reilly, Sheri Anderson, Dena Higley, Mel Brez, Ethel M. Brez, Marlene Clark Poulter, Dorothy Ann Purser, Fran Myers, Maralyn Thoma, Michelle Poteet Lisanti, Mary Jeannett LeDonne, Elizabeth Harrower, Pete T. Rich and N. Gail Lawrence	Nominated	
2000	Sally Sussman Morina, Dena Higley, Marlene Clark Poulter, Dorothy Ann Purser, Victor Gialanella, Meredith Post, Peter Brash, Peggy Schibi, Fran Myers, Maralyn Thoma, Joyce Rosenblad, Bruce Neckels and Sofia Landon Geier	Won	
2002	Tom Langan, Dena Higley, Dorothy Ann Purser, Victor Gialanella, Peter Brash, Paula Cwikly, Frances Myers, Sofia Landon Geier, Jeanne Marie Grunwell, Randy Holland, Edwin Klein, Richard Culliton, Christopher Whitesell, Joyce Rosenblad and Cydney Kelley	Nominated	
2013	Lorraine Broderick, Carolyn Culliton, Richard Culliton, Rick Draughon, Christopher Dunn, Lacey Dyer, Janet Iacobuzio, David A. Levinson, Ryan Quan, Dave Ryan, Melissa Salmons, Roger Schroeder, Elizabeth Snyder, Christopher J. Whitesell and Nancy Williams Watt	Nominated	
2014	Lorraine Broderick, David Cherrill, Carolyn Culliton, Richard Culliton, Rick Draughon, Christopher Dunn, Janet Iacobuzio, David A. Levinson, Ryan Quan, Dave Ryan, Melissa Salmons and Christopher J. Whitesell	Won	
2015	Lorraine Broderick, David Cherrill, Carolyn Culliton, Richard Culliton, Rick Draughon, Christopher Dunn, Janet Iacobuzio, Ryan Quan, Dave Ryan, Melissa Salmons and Christopher J. Whitesell	Nominated	
2018	Ron Carlivati, Sheri Anderson Thomas, Lorraine Broderick, David Cherrill, Lisa Connor, Carolyn Culliton	Nominated	
2019	Ron Carlivati, Sheri Anderson Thomas, Lorraine Broderick, David Cherrill, Joanna Cohen, Lisa Connor, Carolyn Culliton, Richard Culliton, Rick Draughon, Cydney Kelley, David Kreizman, David A. Levinson, Rebecca Taylor, Ryan Quan, Dave Ryan, Katherine Schock, Elizabeth Snyder, Tyler Topits	Nominated	
2020	Lorraine Broderick, Ron Carlivati, Joanna Cohen, Carolyn Culliton, Richard Culliton, Rick Draughon, David Kreizman, Rebecca Taylor, Ryan Quan, Dave Ryan, Elizabeth Snyder, Katherine Schock	Nominated	
2021	Ron Carlivati, Lorraine Broderick, Joanna Cohen, Carolyn Culliton, Richard Culliton, Rick Draughon, David Kreizman, Rebecca Taylor, Ryan Quan, Dave Ryan, Katherine Schock, Elizabeth Snyder	Won	
2022	Ron Carlivati, Lorraine Broderick, Joanna Cohen, Carolyn Culliton, Richard Culliton, Jamey Giddens, David Kreizman, Ryan Quan, Dave Ryan, Katherine Schock, Elizabeth Snyder	Won	
2023	Ron Carlivati, Lorraine Broderick, Jazmen Darnell Brown, Joanna Cohen, Carolyn Culliton, Richard Culliton, Cheryl L. Davis, Kirk Doering, Christopher Dunn, Jamey Giddens, David Kreizman, Ryan Quan, Dave Ryan, Katherine Schock	Won	
2024	Ron Carlivati, Sonja Alarr, Jazmen Darnell Brown, Joanna Cohen, Carolyn Culliton, Richard Culliton, Cheryl Davis, Kirk Doering, Christopher DunnJamey Giddens, David Kreizman, Henry Newman, Dave Ryan, Katherine Schock, Ryan Quan	Won	

== Young Artist Awards ==
Year	Category	Nominee	Result	Ref
1979	Best Juvenile Actor in a Daytime Series	Meegan King (Pete Curtis)	Won	
1979	Best Juvenile Actor in a Daytime Series	Mikey Martin	Nominated	
1979	Best Juvenile Actress in a Daytime Series	Tracey E. Bregman (Donna Temple Craig)	Won	
1979	Best Juvenile Actress in a Daytime Series	Natasha Ryan (Hope Brady)	Nominated	
1980	Best Young Actor – Daytime TV Series	Jeremy Schoenberg	Nominated	
1980	Best Young Actress – Daytime TV Series	Tracey E. Bregman (Donna Temple Craig)	Nominated	
1989	Best Young Actor in a Daytime Drama Series	Michael Bays (Julio Ramirez)	Won	
1989	Best Young Actor in a Daytime Drama Series	Darrell Utley (Benjy Hawk)	Nominated	
1989	Best Young Actress in a Daytime Drama Series	Christie Clark (Carrie Brady)	Nominated	
1989	Best Young Actress in a Daytime Drama Series	Charlotte Ross (Eve Donovan)	Nominated	
1991	Best Young Actor in a Daytime Drama Series	Scott Groff (Shawn-Douglas Brady)	Nominated	
1991	Best Young Actress in a Daytime Series	Aimee Brooks (Sarah Horton)	Won	
1992	Best Young Actor in a Daytime Drama Series	Scott Groff (Shawn-Douglas Brady)	Won	
1998	Best Performance in a Daytime Drama: Young Performers (Male)	Collin O'Donnell (Shawn-Douglas Brady)	Won	
2002	Best Performance in a TV Drama Series: Leading Young Actress	Kirsten Storms (Belle Black)	Won	
2004	Best Performance in a TV Series: Supporting Young Actor	Christopher Gerse (Will Roberts)	Nominated	
2004	Best Performance in a TV Series: Recurring Young Actor	Darian Weiss (Will Roberts)	Nominated	
2004	Best Performance in a TV Series: Recurring Young Actress	Jillian Clare (Abigail Deveraux)	Won	
2005	Best Performance in a TV Series: Recurring Young Actor	Christopher Gerse (Will Roberts)	Nominated	
2005	Best Performance in a TV Series: Recurring Young Actress	Jillian Clare (Abigail Deveraux)	Won	
2009	Best Performance in a TV Series: Recurring Young Actor	Terrell Ransom Jr. (Theo Carver)	Nominated	
2011	Best Performance in a Daytime TV Series: Young Actor	Dylan Patton (Will Horton)	Nominated	
2011	Best Performance in a Daytime TV Series: Young Actress	Taylor Spreitler (Mia McCormick)	Nominated	
2011	Best Performance in a Daytime TV Series: Young Actress	Gabriela Rodriquez (Gabi Hernandez)	Nominated	
2011	Best Performance in a Daytime TV Series: Young Actress 12 and under	Lauren Boles (Ciara Brady)	Nominated	
2012	Best Performance in a Daytime TV Series: Young Actress 10 and under	Lauren Boles (Ciara Brady)	Nominated	
2013	Best Performance in a Daytime TV Series: Young Actor	Terrell Ransom Jr. (Theo Carver)	Nominated	
2013	Best Performance in a Daytime TV Series: Young Actress 10 and under	Campbell Rose (Allie Horton)	Nominated	

== Other awards ==
Year	Award	Category	Nominee	Result	Ref
1991	Environmental Media Awards	Daytime Television	Days of Our Lives	Won	
1999	TV Guide Awards	Favorite Soap Opera	Days of Our Lives	Won	
2000	TV Guide Awards	Favorite Soap Opera	Days of Our Lives	Won	
