= C2SV =

Creative Convergence Silicon Valley. (C2SV)
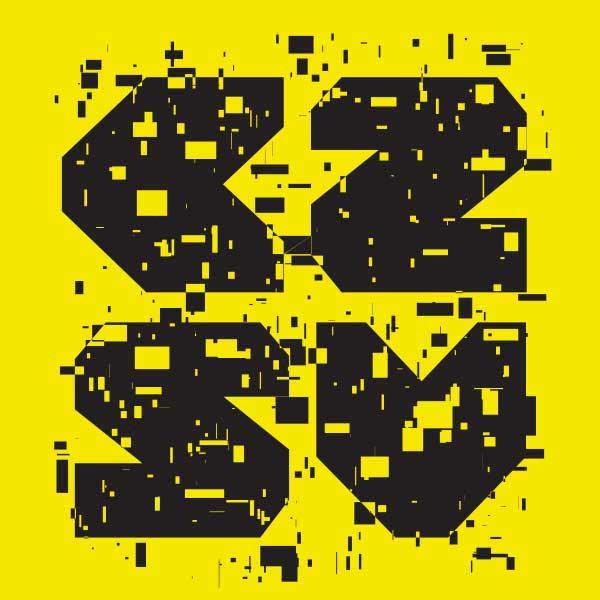
- Dates: October 6–8, 2016
- Frequency: Annual
- Locations: SoFA District, San Jose, California, United States
- Years active: 2012–2016
- Next event: 2016
- Organizer: C2SV San Jose, LLC
- Website: www.c2sv.com

Creative Convergence Silicon Valley, or C2SV, was an annual multi-day music festival and technology conference held each fall in San Jose, California, United States from 2012 to 2016. It was founded in 2012 as the Silicon Valley Sound eXperience (SVSX), a one-day event, 3 p.m. to midnight on September 22 at various downtown San Jose venues, founded by Dan Pulcrano, the CEO of Metro Newspapers.

In 2013, it changed its name to Creative Convergence Silicon Valley (C2SV), with the addition of a technology conference.

C2SV was patterned after technology and music events held in other cities, most notably the South by Southwest (SXSW) festival in Austin, Texas, but also NXNE in Toronto, Ontario and MFNW in Portland, Oregon. The group of blended festivals and conferences with whimsical four-character acronyms, established by weekly alternative newspapers, have been called “four-letter festivals" in the industry.

== Music festival ==
In 2012, performers included Maxx Cabello Jr., Anya (Kvitka) and the Get Down, Will Sprott of the Mumlers, rappers Antwon and Cities Aviv, battle rapper Dirtbag Dan, Fierce Creatures, Containher and Mike Huguenor.

The 2013 festival featured a concert in San Jose’s St. James Park with Iggy and The Stooges on September 28, 2013. Supporting main stage acts were Thee Oh Sees, Bosnian Rainbows and The Bang Girl Group Revue. Five models painted by artist Trina Merry joined Iggy Pop on-stage during one of the songs. Artist Shepard Fairey issued a limited edition poster commemorating the Stooges’ C2SV Festival show. Club performances at 12 venues included The Lemonheads, The Limousines, metal band Deafheaven, hardcore punk band Off!, Mondo Generator, The Coup and Dam Funk.

In 2014, C2SV Music and Tech Conference was held in downtown San Jose’s SoFA District from 10 September to 14 September. Conference presenters included technology entrepreneur and author Vivek Wadhwa, journalist Yasha Levine and BlogHer cofounder Elisa Camahort Page. Club music showcases and the revived SoFA Street Fair comprised the musical portion.

In 2015, the conference and festival was held October 8–9, 2015 in the SoFA District, according to organizers.

In 2016, headliners for the music festival include Donald Glaude, Shonen Knife and Eric Victorino.

== Technology conference ==
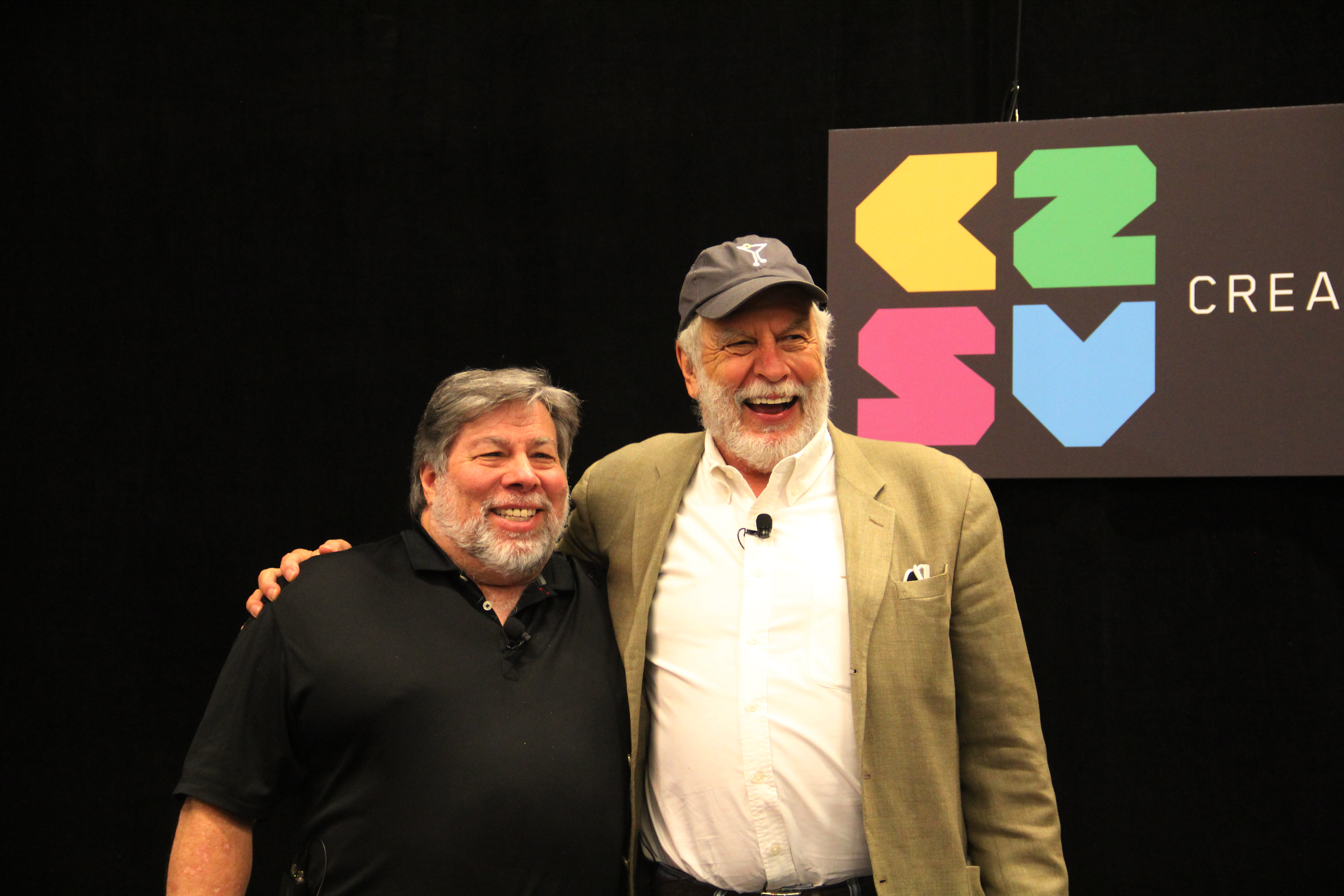
Steve Wozniak and Nolan Bushnell at C2SV 2013 Conference

In 2013, the three-day inaugural conference, held September 26–28, 2013 at the San Jose McEnery Convention Center, included keynotes by technology evangelist Robert Scoble, guitarist James Williamson (musician) and author, CEO and brain scientist Jeff Stibel. The plenary-style stage also hosted a wide-ranging series of discussions on Bitcoin, self-driving cars, robotics, drones, augmented reality, space travel and open source web standards. Other notable speakers included Chris Anderson, former editor-in-chief of Wired magazine, Match.com founder Gary Kremen, Eloan co-founder Chris Larsen, Apache server programmer Brian Behlendorf, WalmartLabs CTO Jeremy King, Yahoo! chair Maynard Webb, eBay Vice President Hugh Williams, Kerio Technologies CEO Scott Schreiman, former California controller Steve Westly and serial entrepreneur Steve Kirsch.

The event also included John McAfee’s first public appearance since his highly publicized escape from Belize and arrest in Guatemala. McAfee used the conference appearance to announce his intentions to market a low-cost secure router to foil government surveillance.

The conference also presented the first on-stage fireside-style discussion with Apple co-founder Steve Wozniak and video game inventor Nolan Bushnell on September 27, 2013.

The 2015 conference, held at the California Theatre, featured Oculus VR inventor Jack McCauley, cameraphone inventor Philippe Kahn and game designer Jane McGonical.

The 2016 conference was held on October 6 and 7, 2016. Uber CTO Thuan Pham provided a keynote. Researchers Hillary Mickell, Michele Madansky, Lisen Stromberg presented “The Elephant in the Valley: Gender Bias in the Technology Industry.” Other speakers included Black Girls Code’s Kimberly Bryant, “Chaos Monkeys: Obscene Fortune and Random Failure in Silicon Valley” author Antonio García Martínez, Waze executive Josh Fried and Men’s Warehouse founder George Zimmer, who sat down with author Bryan Kramer.

== See also ==
- ZERO1
