= Chandler Massey =

American actor and singer (born 1990)

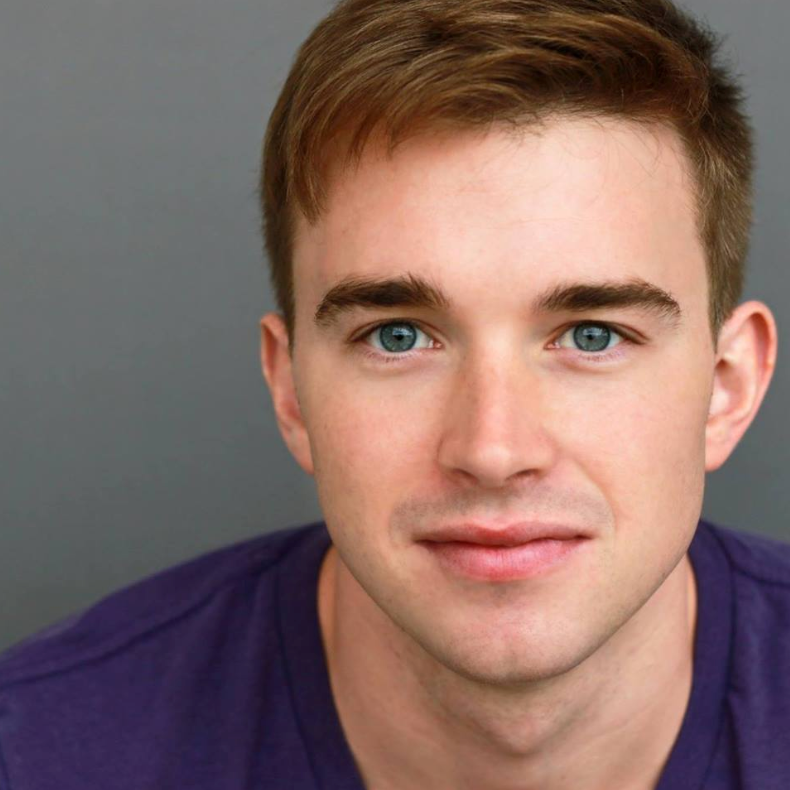
- Massey in February 2015
- Born: September 10, 1990 (age 35); Norcross, Georgia, U.S.
- Education: Norcross High School
- Alma mater: University of California, Los Angeles (BA)
- Occupations: Actor; singer
- Years active: 2008–present
- Parent(s): Lewis A. Massey; Amy Reichard Massey

Chandler Abit Massey (born September 10, 1990) is an American actor and singer, best known for his portrayal of Will Horton on the NBC daytime soap opera Days of Our Lives.

Massey was awarded the Daytime Emmy Award for Outstanding Younger Actor in a Drama Series three years in a row – in 2012, 2013, and 2014, and is the first actor ever to receive the Daytime Emmy Award for playing a gay character. In 2018 and 2020, Massey was nominated for the Daytime Emmy Award for Outstanding Supporting Actor in a Drama Series.

== Personal life ==
Massey was born and raised in Norcross, Georgia. He is the son of Lewis A. Massey, former Secretary of State of Georgia, and Amy Reichard Massey. He has two younger siblings: Cameryn and Christian.

He graduated from Norcross High School in May 2009. While there, he was active in its drama club and took part in many of the school productions, including playing the lead roles in Little Shop of Horrors, One Flew Over the Cuckoo's Nest, Guys and Dolls and How to Succeed in Business Without Really Trying.

Later that year, he moved to Los Angeles to attend the University of California at Los Angeles (UCLA) and to pursue an acting career. At UCLA, he played on the Ultimate Frisbee team, where he was given the nickname "Bamm Bamm." While working on Days of Our Lives, Massey roomed with his friend and Days co-star Casey Deidrick.

In March 2023, Massey got engaged to long time girlfriend Stephanie Bennett.

== Acting career ==
=== Days of Our Lives ===
"Massey brings a pureness to the role of Will that makes you love him. This is a brilliant young actor who will move you to tears based on a look alone."

— Jessica Radloff, Glamour Magazine

In December 2009, after completing his first quarter at UCLA, Massey successfully auditioned for the role of Will Horton on NBC’s daytime drama Days of Our Lives, joining the cast in 2010. He had previously auditioned for Will when Dylan Patton was cast. For this role, Massey became the first actor in history to win the Daytime Emmy Award for portraying a gay character, when he won the Outstanding Younger Actor category in 2012. He had been nominated in the same category the previous year. In February 2013, Massey's younger brother, Christian, appeared as a young Will Horton on Days of Our Lives in a flashback. In June 2013, Massey won his second consecutive Daytime Emmy for Outstanding Younger Actor. Massey revealed that he intended to return to school instead of renewing his contract, which was set to expire in December 2013. Days executive producer Ken Corday stated that his character would not be recast, and that the door would be open in case Massey decided to return; but Massey expressed that he would support a recast. On August 23, 2013, it was announced that Massey had taped his final episode that day, and that a recast had already been made. Massey was let out of his contract early, for which he thanked Days and NBC. On June 22, 2014, Massey won his third consecutive Emmy for Outstanding Younger Actor in a Drama Series. Massey made Daytime Emmys history with his three consecutive wins in the Younger Actor category. While he is the second actor to win the category three times – following Jonathan Jackson, who won for General Hospital in 1995, 1998, and 1999 – he is the first to do so in consecutive years. Massey is also the first actor from Days of Our Lives ever to win three Emmys, consecutive or otherwise.

"There is a reason that Massey has three Daytime Emmys to his name. His work is at once understated, powerful, truthful, and has the ability to touch the hearts of millions"

— Michael Fairman, MichaelFairmanTV.com

On May 8, 2017, Entertainment Weekly announced that Massey was reprising the role of Will on Days of Our Lives, and Massey expressed excitement at bringing the character back. His new episodes began airing on September 15, 2017. Kristyn Burtt of SheKnows said Massey's return was a "huge watershed moment" for the network; in 2018, Massey was again nominated for a Daytime Emmy Award, this time for Outstanding Supporting Actor in a Drama Series.

On March 10, 2022 Chandler Massey has returned to Days of our Lives in a recurring role.

=== Other work ===
Massey has made guest appearances in several drama series, including One Tree Hill and Army Wives, as well as appeared in the HBO comedy series, Eastbound & Down. In 2011, he starred in his first feature film, 16-Love, in which he portrayed Farrell Gambles, a fun-loving junior tennis player, and the love interest of Lindsey Shaw's lead character, Ally Mash. Backstage wrote that he gave "levels to his character" as the "boyish, smitten, too-romantic-to-be-true athlete next door." Following its release in January 2012, the film topped iTunes' Sports Movies chart for several weeks.

Massey is also a musician, serving as the keyboardist and one of the two clean vocalists in the metal band And Still I Rise.

== Filmography ==
Film
Year	Title	Role	Notes	Ref.
2009	For What I Had to Fear	Ben Tucker	Short film Directed by Andrew Schwab	
2012	16-Love	Farrell Gambles	Feature film debut Directed by Adam Lipsius	
2014	Angels in Stardust	Angelo	Directed by William Robert Carey	
2016	The Standoff	Chris Goodman	Directed by Ilyssa Goodman	
2016	I Remember You	AJ	Short film Directed by Michael W. Catlin	
2017	Aquarians	Danny	Directed by Michael M. McGuire	
2017	Butterfly Caught	Terry	Directed by Manny Rodriguez, Jr.	
2018	Hide in the Light	Shane	Directed by Mikey McGregor	

== Television ==
Year	Title	Role	Notes
2009	Eastbound & Down	Pliny Caldwell	Episode 1.03: "Chapter 3"
2007-2013	Army Wives	Ben Goldsmith	Episode 3.13: "Duty to Inform"
2010–14, 2017–	Days of Our Lives	Will Horton	Series regular (2010–14, 2017–20); Guest appearances (2020–)
2015	Bad Judge	Derek	Episode 1.10: "The Fixer"
2015	AfterBuzz TV's Spotlight On	Himself	Interview on August 16, 2015.
2016	Bunk'd	Noah	Episode 1.17: "For Love and Money"
2021	Days of Our Lives: Beyond Salem	Will Horton	Miniseries
2021	Days of Our Lives: A Very Salem Christmas	Will Horton	Television film
2021	Next Stop, Christmas	Ben Lee	Television film (Hallmark Channel)
2022	Heart of the Matter	Henry Lowery	Television film (Hallmark Movies & Mysteries)
2022	A Tale of Two Christmases	Drew	Television film (Hallmark Channel)
2023	The Professional Bridesmaid	Henry Whittington	Television film (Hallmark Channel)
2023	Mystic Christmas	Sawyer Adams	Television film (Hallmark Channel)
2024	A '90s Christmas	Matt	Television film (Hallmark Channel)

== Awards and nominations ==
Year	Award	Category	Work	Result	Ref.
2011	Daytime Emmy Award	Outstanding Younger Actor in a Drama Series	Days of Our Lives	Nominated	
2012	Daytime Emmy Award	Outstanding Younger Actor in a Drama Series	Days of Our Lives	Won	
2013	Daytime Emmy Award	Outstanding Younger Actor in a Drama Series	Days of Our Lives	Won	
2014	Daytime Emmy Award	Outstanding Younger Actor in a Drama Series	Days of Our Lives	Won	
2018	Daytime Emmy Award	Outstanding Supporting Actor in a Drama Series	Days of Our Lives	Nominated	
2020	Daytime Emmy Award	Outstanding Supporting Actor in a Drama Series	Days of Our Lives	Nominated	
