= 37th Daytime Emmy Awards =

- Date: June 27, 2010 (Ceremony); June 25 (Creative Arts Awards)
- Location: Las Vegas Hilton, Paradise, Nevada
- Presented by: National Academy of Television Arts and Sciences
- Hosted by: Regis Philbin

Highlights
- Outstanding Drama Series: The Bold and the Beautiful
- Outstanding Game Show: Cash Cab

Television/radio coverage
- Network: CBS
- Produced by: Associated Television International

The 37th Annual Daytime Emmy Awards were held on Sunday, June 27, 2010, at the Las Vegas Hilton, and were televised on CBS. The Daytime Entertainment Creative Arts Emmy Awards were presented two days earlier on June 25 at the Westin Bonaventure Hotel.

The televised ceremony was hosted by Regis Philbin, and the nominations were announced May 12, 2010, partially on The Early Show.

== Nominations and winners ==
The following is a list of nominees, with winners in bold:

Category	Winners and nominees
Outstanding Drama Series	All My Children; **The Bold and the Beautiful**; General Hospital; The Young and the Restless
Outstanding Lead Actor	Peter Bergman (Jack Abbott, The Young and the Restless); Doug Davidson (Paul Williams, The Young and the Restless); Jon Lindstrom (Craig Montgomery, As the World Turns); **Michael Park (Jack Snyder, As the World Turns)**; James Scott (EJ DiMera, Days of Our Lives)
Outstanding Lead Actress	Sarah Brown (Claudia Zacchara, General Hospital); Crystal Chappell (Olivia Spencer, Guiding Light); Bobbie Eakes (Krystal Carey, All My Children); Michelle Stafford (Phyllis Newman, The Young and the Restless); **Maura West (Carly Tenney, As the World Turns)**
Outstanding Supporting Actor	Bradford Anderson (Damien Spinelli, General Hospital); Ricky Paull Goldin (Jake Martin, All My Children); Jonathan Jackson (Lucky Spencer, General Hospital); Brian Kerwin (Charlie Banks, One Life to Live); **Billy Miller (Billy Abbott, The Young and the Restless)**
Outstanding Supporting Actress	Beth Chamberlin (Beth Raines, Guiding Light); Carolyn Hennesy (Diane Miller, General Hospital); **Julie Pinson (Janet Ciccone, As the World Turns)**; Bree Williamson (Jessica Brennan, One Life to Live); Arianne Zucker (Nicole DiMera, Days of Our Lives)
Outstanding Younger Actor	**Drew Tyler Bell (Thomas Forrester, The Bold and the Beautiful)**; Scott Clifton (Schuyler Joplin, One Life to Live); Zack Conroy (James Spaulding, Guiding Light); Drew Garrett (Michael Corinthos, General Hospital); Dylan Patton (Will Horton, Days of Our Lives)
Outstanding Younger Actress	**Julie Marie Berman (Lulu Spencer, General Hospital)**; Molly Burnett (Melanie Layton Kiriakis, Days of Our Lives); Shelley Hennig (Stephanie Johnson, Days of Our Lives); Christel Khalil (Lily Ashby, The Young and the Restless); Marnie Schulenburg (Alison Stewart, As the World Turns
Outstanding Writing Team	All My Children; As the World Turns; **The Bold and the Beautiful**; The Young and the Restless
Outstanding Directing Team	All My Children; The Bold and the Beautiful; **General Hospital**; One Life to Live
Outstanding Achievement in Art Direction/Set Decoration/Scenic Design for a Drama Series	**The Young and the Restless (CBS)**; General Hospital (ABC); As the World Turns (CBS); The Bold and the Beautiful (CBS); One Life to Live ( ABC)
Outstanding Achievement for a Casting Director for a Drama Series	Mark Teschner, General Hospital (ABC); Marnie Saitta, Days of Our Lives (NBC); **Julie Madison, One Life to Live ( ABC)**; Christy Dooley, The Bold and the Beautiful (CBS); Judy Blye Wilson, All My Children (ABC)
Outstanding Achievement in Costume Design for a Drama Series	The Young and the Restless (CBS); As the World Turns (CBS); One Life to Live (ABC); **All My Children (ABC)**
Outstanding Achievement in Hairstyling for a Drama Series	As the World Turns (CBS); Days of Our Lives (NBC); **The Bold and the Beautiful (CBS)**; One Life to Live ( ABC)
Outstanding Achievement in Lighting Direction for a Drama Series	The Young and the Restless (CBS); General Hospital (ABC); One Life to Live ( ABC); **All My Children (ABC)**
Outstanding Achievement in Live & Direct to Tape Sound Mixing for a Drama Series	**The Young and the Restless (CBS)**; As the World Turns (CBS); General Hospital (ABC); One Life to Live ( ABC)
Outstanding Achievement in Makeup for a Drama Series	The Bold and the Beautiful (CBS); The Young and the Restless (CBS); As the World Turns (CBS); **All My Children (ABC)**
Outstanding Achievement in Multiple Camera Editing For A Drama Series	The Young and the Restless (CBS); As the World Turns (CBS); **General Hospital (ABC)**; One Life to Live ( ABC)
Outstanding Achievement in Music Direction and Composition For A Drama Series	The Young and the Restless (CBS); **The Bold and the Beautiful (CBS)**; General Hospital (ABC); One Life to Live ( ABC)
Outstanding ORIGINAL SONG FOR A DRAMA SERIES	**The Young and the Restless (CBS)**; The Bold and the Beautiful (CBS); Days of Our Lives (NBC)
Outstanding Technical Direction/Electronic Camera/Video Control for a Drama Series	The Young and the Restless (CBS); **General Hospital (ABC)**; Days of Our Lives (NBC); All My Children (ABC)
Outstanding New Approaches - Daytime Entertainment	Indebted (mtvU); **Unplugged (MTV)**; The Ellen DeGeneres Show (Syndicated); The New York Times Style Magazine Screen Test Series (NYTIMES.COM)
Outstanding Promotional Announcement - Episodic	**General Hospital "Graffiti" (ABC)**; General Hospital "Carnival" (ABC); The Today Show (NBC)
Outstanding Promotional Announcement - Institutional	**PBS Kids Trusted Guide (PBS)**; NICK JR. IDS: Counting, Reindeer, Birds & Seeds (Nickelodeon); NICK JR. Parent Directed Spot (Nickelodeon)
Outstanding Special Class Series	Travelscope (PBS); Ruby (The Style Network); **The Relic Hunter with Ian Grant (Travel Channel)**; Equitrekking (PBS); Laura McKenzie's Traveler (Syndicated)
Outstanding Special Class Special	We Are One: The Obama Inaugural Celebration at the Lincoln Memorial (HBO); **Clean House: The Messiest Home in the Country (The Style Network)**; ON the Edge: The Poverty Crisis in Africa (Fox Reality Channel)
Outstanding Entertainment Talk Show	**The Ellen DeGeneres Show**; Live with Regis and Kelly; Rachael Ray
Outstanding Informative Talk Show	The Dr. Oz Show; Dr. Phil; **The Doctors**
Outstanding Talk Show Host	Bonnie Hunt on The Bonnie Hunt Show; Regis Philbin and Kelly Ripa on Live with Regis and Kelly; Rachael Ray on Rachael Ray; **Mehmet Oz on The Dr. Oz Show**; Barbara Walters, Whoopi Goldberg, Joy Behar, Elisabeth Hasselbeck, and Sherri Shepherd on The View
Outstanding Morning Program	American Morning (CNN); Good Morning America (ABC); **The Today Show (NBC)**
Outstanding Lifestyle Program	Clean House; How Do I Look?; Make: **Martha**; This Old House
Outstanding Culinary Program	America's Test Kitchen; Gourmet's Adventures with Ruth; **Giada at Home**; Tyler's Ultimate
Outstanding Lifestyle/Culinary Host	Bobby Flay, Grill It! with Bobby Flay (Food Network); **Ina Garten, Barefoot Contessa: Back to Basics (Food Network)**; Paula Deen, Paula's Best Dishes (Food Network); Martha Stewart, The Martha Stewart Show (Syndicated); Giada De Laurentiis, Giada at Home (Food Network)
Outstanding Legal/Courtroom Program	Caso Cerrado (Telemundo); **Cristina's Court (syndicated)**; Judge Judy (syndicated); Judge Jeanine Pirro (syndicated); The People's Court (syndicated)
Outstanding Game/Audience Participation Show	Are You Smarter Than a 5th Grader? (syndicated); **Cash Cab (Discovery)**; Jeopardy! (syndicated); The Price Is Right (CBS); Wheel of Fortune (syndicated)
Outstanding Game Show Host	**Ben Bailey, Cash Cab (Discovery)**; Wayne Brady, Let's Make a Deal (CBS); Pat Sajak, Wheel of Fortune (syndicated); Alex Trebek, Jeopardy! (syndicated); Carnie Wilson, The Newlywed Game (GSN)
Outstanding Stunt Coordination	Tim Davison, General Hospital (ABC); **Dorenda Moore, Kamen Rider: Dragon Knight (The CW4KidsThe CW)**; Danny Aiello III & Vincent Cupone, One Life to Live (ABC); Jake Turner, As the World Turns (CBS); Mike Cassidy, The Bold and the Beautiful (CBS)
Outstanding New Approaches - Daytime Children's	Come On Over (COMEONOVER.COM); Fizzy's Lunch Lab (PBS); Design Squad (PBS); **The Electric Company (PBS)**
Outstanding Pre-School Children's Series	The Wonder Pets! (Nickelodeon); Between the Lions (PBS); **Sesame Street (PBS)**
Outstanding Children's Animated Program	The Backyardigans; **Curious George**; Sid the Science Kid; WordGirl
Outstanding Special Class Animated Program	**Robert Schooley, Mark McCorkle, Bret Haaland, Dean Hoff and Dina Buteyn (The Penguins of Madagascar)**‡; **Paul Tibbitt, Dina Buteyn and Stephen Hillenburg (SpongeBob SquarePants)**; Bradley Zweig, Chris Plourde, Joyce Campbell and Lisa Henson (Sid the Science Kid); Sascha Paladino, Mary Harrington, Jeff DeGrandis and Andrew Huebner (Ni Hao, Kai-Lan)
Outstanding Children's Series	Fetch! with Ruff Ruffman; Design Squad; **The Electric Company**
Outstanding Sound Mixing - Live Action and Animation	**Michael Beiriger and Ray Leonard (The Fairly OddParents)**; Dean Giammarco and Ewan Deane (Hot Wheels: Battle Force 5); Kenn Fuller (The Mr. Men Show)
Outstanding Writing in Animation	**Gene Grillo, Dan Serafin, Tom Sheppard and Jed Spingarn (Back at the Barnyard)**; **Kim Roberson, Bobby Gaylor, Antoine Guilbaud and Dan Povenmire (Phineas and Ferb)**; Carla Filisha, John N. Huss, Jack Ferraiolo, Eric Ledgin, Tom Martin, Matt Fleckenstein, Will Shepard, Kim Samek and Ryan Raddatz (WordGirl); Kevin Sullivan, Butch Hartman, Scott Fellows, William Schifrin, Thomas Krajewski, Ed Valentine, Charlotte Fullerton, Amy Keating Rogers, Joanna Lewis, Gary Conrad and Ray De Laurentis (The Fairly OddParents); Bill Motz, Mark McCorkle, Bob Roth, Eddie Guzelian, Brandon Sawyer and Robert Schooley (The Penguins of Madagascar); Jim Conroy and Glen Berger (FETCH! with Ruff Ruffman)
Outstanding Directing in an Animated Program	Erik Wiese, Alex Kirwan and Cynthia True (The Mighty B!); Alan Smart, Andrew Overtoom, Tom Yasumi and Andrea Romano (SpongeBob SquarePants); Nicholas Filippi, Bret Haaland and Lisa Schaffer (The Penguins of Madagascar); **Jim Schumann, Brian Sheesley and Ginny McSwain (Fanboy & Chum Chum)**

=== Lifetime Achievement Award ===
- **Agnes Nixon**

=== Special Tributes ===
- **All My Children**
- **As the World Turns**
- **Dick Clark**
- **American Bandstand**
- **Daytime Gives Back, Feed The Children**
