= 16-Love =

2012 romantic comedy film directed by Adam Lipsius

- Official poster
- Directed by: Adam Lipsius
- Screenplay by: Leigh Dunlap
- Produced by: Ilyssa Goodman
- Starring: Lindsey Shaw; Chandler Massey; Keith Coulouris; Lindsey Black; Susie Abromeit
- Cinematography: Alan Caso
- Edited by: Tina Pacheko
- Music by: Russ Howard III
- Production company: Uptown 6 Productions
- Release date: January 20, 2012
- Running time: 88 minutes
- Country: United States
- Language: English

16-Love is a 2012 American romantic comedy film directed by Adam Lipsius, written by Leigh Dunlap, and starring Lindsey Shaw, Chandler Massey, Keith Coulouris, Lindsey Black, and Susie Abromeit. Produced by Ilyssa Goodman, and Adam Lipsius, the story centers on a 16-year-old female tennis prodigy who while sidelined by injury discovers the normal teenage life she has missed out on, including falling in love. It was released on January 20, 2012 in the United States.

== Plot ==
Ally Mash is a 16-year-old high school student and prodigy tennis player. Her dad, who won the Open back in the day, is also her obsessive coach. He is always pushing her to become the best, and restricting her from doing things that can distract her, including through his disapproval of her best friend, Rebecca. She meets attractive amateur tennis player Farrell Gambles, who immediately likes her, though she rebuffs him due to his tennis level. One day during a tournament, she plays Russian rival Katina Upranova and injures her ankle, forfeiting the game. Her dad soon assembles a team of physical and mental therapists to help her get back on track.

Farrell asks Ally to coach him for an upcoming tournament, which if he wins, can help him get into college due to financial difficulties. Initially refusing, he aids her in a small situation at the mall, and she agrees. She trains him hard, through running and footwork exercises. She also confides in him that she's never experienced what normal teenagers get to do, like go out for ice cream or have a prom. So, he throws her a personal prom and she begins to like him as well.

Farrell begins playing in his tournament, rapidly advancing through with Ally's support. Her dad disapproves of her skipping therapy sessions to be at the matches, but she finally stands up and tells him that she will make her own decisions. During a photo session before finals, Katina notices Ally's attraction to Farrell and kisses him in front of her. Upset, she leaves and doesn't show up to his final match, which he loses. She also goes to an exclusive beach party held by mean popular girls at their school who refuse to invite Rebecca. Rebecca is hurt and takes a break from Ally. Farrell is also upset that she ditched him, and explains that Katina kissed him out of the blue.

Ally apologizes and then asks Farrell if he will be her partner in an upcoming mixed doubles tournament, to which he agrees and forgives her. They begin training together and end up winning the tournament, though Ally falls on her ankle again. Ally also enrolls in the singles tournament, for her rematch with Katina. With newfound confidence and her friends and family supporting her, she wins against Katina with her ankle injury and finally kisses Farrell.

The film ends with everyone happy with the way their life is going, and Ally satisfied with her balanced life of sports and social events.

== Cast ==
- Lindsey Shaw as Ally Mash
- Chandler Massey as Farrell Gambles
- Keith Coulouris as Dave Mash
- Lindsey Black as Rebecca
- de:Susie Abromeit as Katina Upranova
- Mark Elias as Nate
- Steven Christopher Parker as Stuart
- Alexandra Paul as Margo Mash
- Josh Cooke as Dr. Jim
- Josh Blaylock as Red Bull
- Sarah Lilly as Amy
- Fabienne Guerin as Debbie

== Production ==
Leigh Dunlap wrote a filmscript called "Smash" about a teenage tennis romantic comedy that formed the basis of 16-Love. The script was promoted by producer Ilyssa Goodman who, in November, 2009, offered it to Adam Lipsius and his wife who had created the film company Uptown 6 Productions. They liked the script and decided to make the film.

Lindsey Shaw was cast in the lead after impressing Lipsius at her audition. He recollected: "... She was so professional and passionate, I just saw her as Ally Mash". Writer Dunlap picked Chandler Massey for male lead due to his acting skills and tennis skill, she wrote: " ... I fought the creative battle of my life to get (Massey) cast as the lead". Lipsius was unconvinced by Massey at first but after playing a tennis game with him and discovering his romantic nature he decided he was right for the part. Susie Abromeit, cast as the Russian player, was a top ten ranked junior who had a Duke University tennis scholarship.

Shooting took place in the San Diego area and Denver over 21 days with ten of those days on a tennis court. Lipsius described the "vital closeness" of shooting the tennis scenes with close-ups of the players' faces to create intensity. CGI visual effects were used to transform 250 spectators into 2000.

Massey commented that shooting the film was "... one of the greatest experiences of my life".

== Release ==
16-Love premiered in the United States on January 20, 2012 with a limited theatrical release along with television rotation, DVD release and on-line streaming.

== Reception ==
In her review of 16-Love for The New York Times, Jeannette Catsoulis criticized the script and direction as being clichéd. She considered: " ... 16-Love is in a sense the perfect movie for teenagers - you can text and tweet to your heart's content and never miss a thing". In his review for Common Sense Media, Renee Schonfeld gave two stars from five. He criticized one-dimensional characters, teen film clichés, and excessive product placement, while praising the performances of Shaw and Massey. He concluded: " ... There's plenty of innocent romance and just enough tennis to hold the audience's interest and keep the story moving". Dennis Harvey, reviewing for Variety criticized the script as predictable but praised the direction and performances. He concluded: " first time feature helmer Adam Lipsius keeps things slick and pacey, and the cast is decent within mostly one-dimensional roles".

== See also ==
- List of media set in San Diego
