= Samantha Skey =

American business executive

- Education: Hamilton College (BA)
- Occupation: CEO of SHE Media

Samantha Skey is an American business executive who is chief executive officer for SHE Media.

== Early life and education ==
Skey holds a Bachelor of Arts degree in comparative literature from Hamilton College.

== Career ==
In her early career, Skey served in management positions at companies such as The Walt Disney Company and CNET. She also worked as an executive at Alloy Online and was the chief marketing officer at Passenger, as well as the chief revenue officer at Recyclebank. Skey is also credited with the first real-time multi-player reward based website, "Riddler," for Interactive Imaginations.

Skey joined SHE Media in 2013. She was the president of the company when it was purchased by Penske Media Corporation in 2018. Four months after the acquisition, she was promoted to CEO. Skey created and launched the Flow Space platform for women's health in 2022 Flow Space brand. Her passion for health equity and innovation continued as she launched the Future of Health event in 2022 at the SHE Media Co-Lab at SXSW. The Future of Health has become a SXSW mainstay- returning annually through 2026 Women's Health Forum

A frequent presenter and commentator for business and trade media, Skey's speaking events include annual SXSW, annual Ad Week panel moderation, MediaPost, Digiday, iMedia, She Summit, Folio, the Gamification Summit of 2011, GreenBiz State of Green Business Forum 2011, the Physic Ventures-Edelman Social Media Summit 2011, SheStreams 2011, OMMA Global New York 2011, Gamification Summit 2011 and ad:tech conference 2011. In an authored Advertising Age article, Skey advised companies on how to reach millennial moms. She said that this generation of mothers (those born after 1980) are wallet-driven activists who consider both family health and environmental sustainability when making purchases. “The Millennial mom has different expectations for the brands she supports and demands transparency and authenticity both from the brand's on- and offline efforts.”

== See also ==
- Recycling
- Gamification
- Sustainability
