= Scott Schreiman =

American technology executive

- Education: Bachelor's Degree, Claremont McKenna College
- Occupation: Technology Executive

Scott Schreiman is an American technology executive who founded Samepage Labs Inc., a productivity and collaboration suite company in Campbell, California. Samepage Labs was acquired by Paylocity on Nov 16, 2020.

Prior to that, Schreiman was CEO and chairman of Kerio Technologies, Inc., a $25 million mail server, firewall and VoIP software vendor. Samepage was spun out of Kerio in 2015. Kerio was acquired in Jan. 2017 by GFI Software.

Schreiman was named a top global influencer in the enterprise technology industry by a panel of industry experts in 2012.

In September 2013, the C2SV Technology Conference tapped Schreiman as an expert on workplace reinvention to moderate a session with Yahoo! chair Maynard Webb and NextSpace CEO Jeremy Neuner.

== Early career ==
Schreiman was vice president and general manager of Aladdin Knowledge Systems, Inc. from August 1994 to March 1998 (3 years 8 months).

He was also the co-founder of MovieWeb.com, a leading film entertainment portal.
