= BlogHer =

American media company

- Industry: Media
- Founded: February 1, 2005; 21 years ago
- Founder: Elisa Camahort Page, Jory des Jardins, and Lisa Stone
- Parent: SHE Media
- Website: www.blogher.com

BlogHer is an American media company founded by Elisa Camahort Page, Jory des Jardins, and Lisa Stone in 2005. It is an online blogger community and holds a yearly conference for women bloggers. BlogHer is owned by SHE Media which is a division of Penske Media Corporation.

== History ==
BlogHer began as a conference in 2005 in San Jose, California, founded by Elisa Camahort Page, Jory des Jardins, and Lisa Stone. It was originally planned to be a blog, but grew to a 300-person conference on women and blogging once announced. In 2006, BlogHer started a group blog featuring over 60 women blogging on a variety of topics. The second BlogHer conference was held in San Jose and was much larger than the first, with at least 750 attendees.

In 2007, the company expanded to include BlogHers Act, a political blogging network by and for women. Dan Gillmor quoted the site's community guideline "We embrace the spirit of civil disagreement" as an ideal. On July 16, 2008, iVillage, a network of online media outlets owned by NBC Universal, announced that it had reached a partnership with the BlogHer network to provide content for sites across the iVillage network. The same year, BlogHer received $5 million in funding from Peacock Ventures, NBC Universal's venture investment arm. Also in 2008, the BlogHer cofounders were honored with the Social Impact ABIE Award from the Anita Borg Institute.

By 2010, BlogHer had 76,000 registered bloggers and 80 paid contributing editors. It also had 2,500 affiliated bloggers with revenue-sharing agreements, with 20 million unique monthly visitors. On November 3, 2014, BlogHer was purchased by SHE Media. In 2018, SHE Media was purchased by Penske Media Corporation.

== BlogHer conference and online community ==
BlogHer holds annual conferences designed to give women bloggers exposure. Its first conference was held in San Jose, California, in 2005. Its community is described as an "ecosystem of blogs where each feeds off the others." It rotates headlines from all bloggers in the community to allow smaller bloggers to benefit from traffic of a larger website.
