= Jack McCauley =

American computer scientist

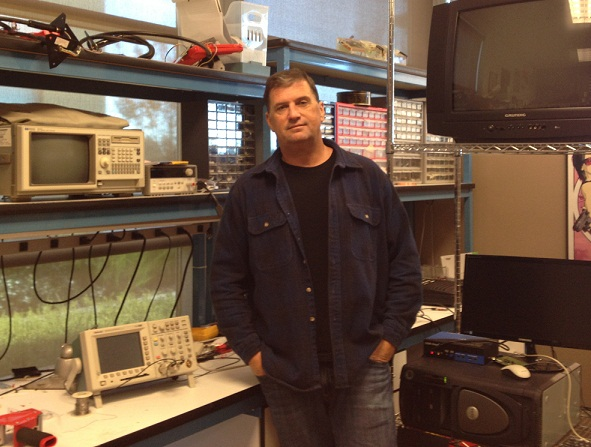
- Born: December 3, 1959 (age 66)
- Education: Bachelor of Science, University of California, Berkeley
- Occupations: Inventor, engineer, video game developer
- Known for: Guitar Hero, Oculus Rift

Jack McCauley is an American engineer, hardware designer, inventor, video game developer and philanthropist. As an engineer at RedOctane, he designed guitars and drums for the Guitar Hero video game series. He later worked at Oculus VR, which was eventually acquired by Facebook for $2 billion.

== Early life and education ==
The son of a United States Armed Forces officer, McCauley's early life began in De Bilt, Netherlands. From an early age, McCauley loved taking things apart, building them into something new, exploring everything from basic spatial relationships to electronics. When he was 9, Tinkertoy named him a "Junior Tinkertoy Engineer".

In 1980, McCauley was accepted into the U.S. Navy Nuclear Power School. He later attended University of California, Berkeley, College of Engineering, where he specialized in electronics and circuit theory and earned a BSc. in electrical engineering and computer science (EECS) in 1986. McCauley credits U.C. Berkeley with moving him into his career as an engineer.

== Career ==
McCauley began his professional career at the U.S. Department of Defense. Upon graduating from Berkeley, he worked at various technology and gaming companies including RedOctane and Microsoft. He helped develop USB drivers, kernel mode drivers, arcade machines and video game related peripherals.

McCauley designed many of the guitar and drum peripherals for the Guitar Hero video game series.

=== Guitar Hero ===
In 2005 McCauley joined RedOctane, where he served as an engineer on the Guitar Hero team. He stayed on after RedOctane became a wholly owned subsidiary of Activision, eventually departing in 2009.

McCauley created the hardware for early Guitar Hero guitars by reverse-engineering the guitars used in the Konami game Guitar Freaks. He also designed hardware peripherals for Silent Scope and EA Sports Active 2.

=== Oculus VR ===
McCauley joined Oculus VR as vice president of engineering in August 2012, shortly after the company raised millions of dollars on Kickstarter for their first development kit. He served as VP Engineering at Oculus until March 2014 when the company was acquired by Facebook for $2 billion. He left Oculus immediately after the acquisition was completed. He claims to have donated all the money he received from the Facebook buyout to charity.

While at Oculus, he designed test equipment and managed China-based manufacturing of the Oculus DK1 and DK2, the company's development hardware that was shipped to game developers years before the 2016 release of their consumer product, the Oculus Rift.

=== Lucid VR ===
In 2017, McCauley joined Lucid VR as Chief Engineer to lead worldwide manufacturing of their flagship virtual and augmented reality camera, the VR180 LucidCam.

=== Inventions, credits, and accomplishments ===
McCauley worked on creating audio effects; computer peripherals; game controllers; light gun technology; composite HID USB device for gaming; and guitar and drum controllers for the Guitar Hero franchise.

Video game	Role	Developer
Guitar Hero II	Director of R&D	RedOctane
Guitar Hero III: Legends of Rock	Director of R&D	RedOctane
Guitar Hero World Tour	Director of R&D	RedOctane
Oculus DK1 Development Kit	VP Engineering	Oculus VR
Oculus DK2 Development Kit	VP Engineering	Oculus VR

== Philanthropy ==
In 2015 he, Paul Jacobs and others funded the Jacobs Institute for Design Innovation at the UC Berkeley College of Engineering; as of October 2015, he is an Innovator in Residence there.
