= Christopher Gerse =

American actor (born 1991)

Christopher Ryan Gerse
- Born: October 19, 1991 (age 34); Los Angeles, California, U.S.
- Education: Chapman University
- Occupation: Actor
- Years active: 2001–present

Christopher Ryan Gerse (born October 19, 1991) is an American actor. He is best known for his role as Will Roberts (later to be known as Will Horton) on the daytime television series Days of Our Lives. For that role he received two Young Artist Award nominations for Best Performance in a Television Series, in 2004 for Supporting Young Actor, and in 2005 for Recurring Young Actor. He was born in Los Angeles, California.

== Filmography ==
| Year | Title | Role | Notes |
|---|---|---|---|
| 2001 | The District | Joshua Gilroy | Episode: "Melt Down" |
| 2002 | ER | Viktor | Episode: "Bygones" |
| 2002 | Hidden Hills | Boy | Episode: "The Getaway" |
| 2003–08 | Days of Our Lives | Will Roberts | Recurring character |
| 2004 | The Bernie Mac Show | Brett | Episode: "It's a Wonderful Wife" |
| 2004 | Malcolm in the Middle | Brett | Episode: "Dewey's Special Class" |
| 2005 | Monk | Stork | Episode: "Mr. Monk and Little Monk" |
| 2016 | Westworld | Destin | 3 episodes |
| 2017 | The Chronicles of Spooner and Moustafa | Spooner | 5 episodes |
| 2018 | Rock Steady Row | Starving Steven | film |
| 2018 | Death Camp | James | Lead role |
