= Ruby (2008 TV series) =

- Genre: Reality
- Country of origin: United States
- No. of seasons: 4
- No. of episodes: 41

Production
- Executive producers: Gay Rosenthal; Brittany Daniel; Ruby Gettinger; Nicholas Caprio; Paul Barrosse; Carrie Franklin; Sarah Weidman; Tim Puntillo
- Running time: 30 minutes (season 1-2); 1 hour (season 3-4)
- Production company: Gay Rosenthal Productions

Original release
- Network: Style
- Release: November 9, 2008 – present

Ruby is an American reality-documentary television series on Style. The series debuted on November 9, 2008 and follows the life of Ruby Gettinger who lives in Savannah, Georgia as she attempts to lose weight. On December 12, 2012, it was announced that Style has passed on a fifth season order of the series and it has since been cancelled. Ruby returned with new episodes October 12, 2022 on a streaming platform with FarmDaze productions. Now titled The Ruby Show, 3 episodes are posted each week.

== Synopsis ==
Gettinger starts the show weighing more than 550lbs (she originally weighed over 750lbs.) Ruby works with nutritionists, doctors, and trainers to lose weight, all the while commenting honestly and often humorously about the experience. The show also deals with the everyday life issues a morbidly obese person can face, such as the difficulty in using airplane bathrooms.

The first season featured one one-hour episode and eight half-hour episodes. The second season featured the same number of episodes as the first season, with mostly half-hour episodes, and a few one-hour episodes. The third season was the first season to feature all one-hour episodes. As of May 2, 2010, the third season featured all hour-long episodes, minus the season finale, which was two hours, plus one special, Ruby: My Australian Adventure. The fourth season featured all hour-long episodes, including the pre-season special: Ruby: My Naked Truth.

== Episodes ==
=== Series overview ===
Season	Episodes	Originally released	
Season	Episodes	First released	Last released
1	9	November 9, 2008	January 4, 2009
2	10	July 5, 2009	September 6, 2009
3	11	February 14, 2010	May 2, 2010
4	10	March 6, 2011	May 8, 2011

=== Season 1 (2008–09) ===
No. overall	No. in season	Title	Original release date
1	1	"Meet Ruby"	November 9, 2008
In the series opener, Ruby, who is a nearly 500-pound woman, is told that her life is in danger if she doesn't exercise, change her eating habits and lose weight. Ruby receives guidance from a personal trainer, an obesity expert and a psychiatrist.
2	2	"Denny Returns"	November 16, 2008
An ex-boyfriend of Ruby's returns after six years to help Ruby with her diet and to get back together with her. Ruby's friends question his motives though.
3	3	"The Temptation of Ruby"	November 23, 2008
Ruby deals with temptation as she decides to eat out with her friends.
4	4	"Ruby's Secret Storm"	November 30, 2008
A severe thunderstorm makes Ruby think about her new way of life and dieting.
5	5	"Ruby Hits the Road"	December 7, 2008
Ruby experiences difficulties when she travels to Los Angeles. Ruby also discusses motherhood with her friends and wonders if she will ever experience it.
6	6	"Ruby's Revelation"	December 14, 2008
Ruby returns from vacation and realizes she has fallen off the bandwagon. She has gained weight and needs to eat healthier and keep moving!
7	7	"The Summit"	December 21, 2008
Ruby's weight-loss team disagrees over how she should continue after her weight falls under 400 pounds.
8	8	"Real Women Have Curves"	December 28, 2008
Ruby puts together a support group for obese women. Ruby recruits a design team to create a new look for herself.
9	9	"Fishing for Memories"	January 4, 2009
Ruby puts together a weekend camping trip.

=== Season 2 (2009) ===
No. overall	No. in season	Title	Original release date
10	1	"Ruby's Road to Rascal Flatts Premiere Version"	June 21, 2009
Ruby has now lost 100 pounds and discusses her journey to this point.
11	2	"Fired Up"	July 5, 2009
Ruby's dad died, and it has taken her on an emotional rollercoaster and her diet gets off track. She attends the Rascal Flatts concert which lifts her spirits.
12	3	"Let's Get Physical"	July 12, 2009
Ruby suddenly does not trust her trainer and the diet she is on when she meets a fitness guru who reveals new information to her.
13	4	"Training Daze"	July 19, 2009
Ruby visits her gynecologist and heads back to work.
14	5	"Making Room for Ruby"	July 26, 2009
After talking with the fitness guru, Ruby looks for a new trainer who can help her succeed with her weight-loss goals.
15	6	"Ruby's Missing Memories"	August 2, 2009
Ruby continues to lose more weight and gets a room makeover.
16	7	"Beach Blanket Ruby"	August 9, 2009
Ruby searches for missing childhood memories.
17	8	"The Doctor is In"	August 16, 2009
Ruby plans to set her friend up with a man while on weekend beach outing with her girlfriends.
18	9	"Losing a Best Friend"	August 23, 2009
Ruby's diet suffers a setback and she agrees to see a specialist about her food addiction.
19	10	"The Final Weigh-In"	September 6, 2009
Ruby's dog gets very sick; Ruby conducts a weight-loss workshop.

=== Season 3 (2010) ===
This is first season to not feature episodes shorter than an hour

No. overall	No. in season	Title	Original release date
21	1	"Ruby's Road to Recovery"	February 14, 2010
After the weight-loss camp, Ruby continues on her weight loss journey.
22	2	"Mississippi Memories"	February 21, 2010
Ruby and her friends and family travel to Mississippi for a relative's birthday.
23	3	"Ruby's Swimsuit Issue"	February 28, 2010
Ruby travels to see Denny and his family, where she puts on a swimsuit and gets in the pool.
24	4	"Let's Get Physical"	March 14, 2010
Ruby gives support to a teen competing in a plus-size beauty pageant.
25	5	"Sleepless in Savannah"	March 21, 2010
Ruby gets a visit from her childhood physician while staying overnight at a sleep clinic.
26	6	"Trimming the Fat"	March 28, 2010
Ruby's therapist makes a suggestion of replacing bad things with healthier options in her life.
27	7	"Ruby: My Australian Adventure"	April 4, 2010
Ruby goes to Australia to promote her new book and conquers a fear at the same time.
28	8	"Skin Tight Ruby"	April 11, 2010
Ruby considers plastic surgery as one of her options for removing her excess skin.
29	9	"Hacky Thanksgiving"	April 18, 2010
Ruby looks into a healthy alternative Thanksgiving dinner with her friends.
30	10	"Ruby Fires Back"	April 25, 2010
Local crime sends Ruby to self-defense classes where she learns to shoot a gun and overcomes her fear of the dark.
31	11	"The Thinner Child"	May 2, 2010
In the two-hour season three finale, Ruby and her friends take on their weight issues by signing up for a six-day weight program.

=== Season 4 (2011) ===
No. overall	No. in season	Title	Original release date
32	0	"Ruby: My Naked Truth"	March 6, 2011
Ruby shares the most intimate stories on her journey to lose weight.
33	1	"Ruby & Denny: Toxic Relationship Premiere Version"	March 6, 2011
Ruby gets Denny to come into town to teach her about cooking healthy because she feels that she has gained weight. They get into a series of arguments, then they have a counseling session that ends in them agreeing to leave each other's life for good. Ruby gets on the scale and discovers that she has gained 30 pounds.
34	2	"Secrets in the Attic"	March 13, 2011
Following her weight gain, Ruby discovers letters from her childhood while cleaning out the attic and is shocked and upset at them. She has a counseling session and a meeting for her Woman's Fat Night group, where pastor Paula White makes an appearance.
35	3	"Ruby's High School Reunion"	March 20, 2011
Ruby & friends have a garage sale to raise money for Ben's move to Los Angeles for music school. Ruby's childhood friends show up and they have a dinner. Meanwhile, Ruby tries to discover more about her letters with the help of pastor Paula White & her therapist. Ruby & friends then head out to a horse center where they get Zach, who is autistic, to ride a horse in hopes of him forgetting that Ben is leaving.
36	4	"Ruby Goes Under"	March 27, 2011
Ruby & the gang go out to LA to help Ben set up for music school. While there, they enjoy time at a water park. Ruby then speaks with Melissa and they go to a reiki session, where she starts blowing up with emotions. They then get Ruby into the backyard pool where she overcomes the fears of the deep end.
37	5	"Ruby's Beach Meltdown"	April 3, 2011
Ruby, Georgia & Jeff go to a mall, where she meets someone at Lane Bryant. She then decides to go to a yogurt shop, while her friends go get hot dogs on a stick, which is a decision she didn't like. The new friends agreed. Ruby sees what Jeff is talking about when he says that she is sick. Ruby has a Woman's Fat Night with her new LA friends. She endures a beach workout with a trainer that she thinks is trying to hurt her. During the episode, she weighs in, only to discover that she has gained even more weight.
38	6	"Ruby Falls for a New Guy"	April 10, 2011
Ruby & friends go to a show, where she meets a guy named Ian. All throughout the episode, Jeff & Georgia think that Ian & Ruby are in a relationship, something she constantly denies. She goes for a walk on a long path, having breathing troubles, but ends up making it to the end. She then goes to Ken Paves and gets hair extensions. She invites Ian to Ben's concert, then they go to a dream art gallery. They then finish off at a French restaurant. The next day, Ruby has a discussion with her close friends about the date the previous night. The episode closes with a conversation over the phone with Dr. Jane.
39	7	"Always a Bridesmaid"	April 17, 2011
Ruby is throwing an engagement party for an old friend named Anna. Denny comes into town and Ruby does her best to control herself. An argument breaks out at the pool. Her gang surprises her with a dummy for her to beat up on. She beats up on it and tries to get Denny to find fault in the situation. Denny realizes there is fault in him for what happened. It is engagement party time and Ruby does enjoy herself at the party, but she thinks that they don't know she is on a diet. Denny & Ruby share a kiss at the party, to which Jeff hopes that they are not getting back together. The next morning, the gang packs up and gives Ben their hugs goodbye. Ruby finds it hard to say bye to Ben. They have a last minute talk before she heads back to Savannah, Georgia.
40	8	"50 Pounds & Gaining"	April 24, 2011
Ruby returns from her month in Los Angeles and meets with Dr. Jane, then afterwards, Carrington calls and she invites her to spend a day with her. Jeff & Ruby go to a store to get gifts for Carrington. Denny calls and wants to come to town to see her. Ruby & Denny go to get their body test done, in which it is revealed that Ruby has over half of her weight in fat. She then gets the people of her system together and she decides to have a summit to hopefully get back on track after having met with her trainers and revealing that she had gained the weight, then working out. Her and Carrington then have lunch together before her mother comes to get her.
41	9	"Ghosts of Childhood"	May 1, 2011
Ruby & her friends make little signs on paper to post around the house. Ruby & Denny go out to dinner, where Denny asks her to please continue the journey. They then go to a charity baseball game, where Ruby's church wins. She then speaks with Paula White on the phone. They then meet up and she opens up about how she doesn't want the little version of Ruby to live. Finally, after more discussion & prayer, she admits that she wants the little Ruby to live, signaling a breakthrough that Ruby Gettinger has been waiting for. After the meeting with the pastor, she goes through the healing workbook that Paula gave her.
42	10	"Ruby Faces Rosie"	May 8, 2011
Ruby & Jeff go to New York City for Ruby's appearance on Rosie O'Donnell's radio show. They walk and Ruby struggles when she constantly is bumping into the passing people. Ruby appears on the radio show and tells Rosie about what she has been going through. She also meets at Rosie's house to discuss more, where she thinks Ruby has been sexually abused, something that Ruby denies. While in New York, Ruby & Jeff do more walking and Jeff records on the camera. The season concludes with Ruby talking with Jeff atop the arch bridge in New York.
