= Will Horton =

- Days of Our Lives character
- Chandler Massey as Will Horton
- Portrayed by: Shawn and Taylor Carpenter (1995–2002); Darian Weiss (2002–2003); Christopher Gerse (2003–2008); Dylan Patton (2009–2010); Chandler Massey (2010–2014, 2017–present); Guy Wilson (2014–2015)
- Duration: 1995–2015; 2017–2023; since 2025
- First appearance: November 16, 1995
- Created by: James E. Reilly
- Introduced by: Ken Corday and Tom Langan (1995); Ken Corday, Albert Alarr and Greg Meng (2017); Ken Corday and Albert Alarr (2021); Ken Corday and Janet Spellman-Drucker (2025)
- Spin-off appearances: Days of Our Lives: Beyond Salem (2021); Days of Our Lives: A Very Salem Christmas (2021)
In-universe information
- Other names: Will Reed; Will Roberts; EJ DiMera
- Occupation: Journalist; Screenwriter; Political campaign staffer; Business intern; Website entrepreneur; Pub worker; Student
- Parents: Lucas Horton; Sami Brady
- Sisters: Allie Horton; Grace Brady (adoptive)
- Half-brothers: Johnny DiMera
- Half-sisters: Sydney DiMera
- Husband: Sonny Kiriakis (2014–2018, 2019–present)
- Daughters: Arianna Horton
- Grandfathers: Roman Brady; Bill Horton; John Black (step)
- Grandmothers: Marlena Evans; Kate Roberts
- Uncles: Austin Reed; Eric Brady; Philip Kiriakis; Rex Brady; Mike Horton; DJ Craig; Brady Black (step)
- Aunts: Carrie Reed; Billie Reed; Jennifer Horton; Belle Black; Cassie Brady
- Nephews: Henry Horton; Trey DiMera (adoptive)
- Nieces: Olivia DiMera
- First cousins: Abigail Deveraux; JJ Deveraux; Claire Brady; Chelsea Brady; Jeremy Horton; Tyler Kiriakis; Noah Reed; Emily Lockhart; Mackenzie Horton

Will Horton is a fictional character from the American daytime TV soap opera Days of Our Lives, known for a highly praised coming out story, award-winning performances by actor Chandler Massey, and as one half of US daytime drama's first male gay wedding and marriage. The character first appears in the episode of November 16, 1995, when his mom Sami Brady (Alison Sweeney) gives birth to him. Initially portrayed by a series of child actors, the character grew up in real-time as the show aired, eventually to be played by adult actors Chandler Massey (2010–2014, 2017–present), and Guy Wilson (2014–2015).

The character is initially named Will Reed, after his presumed father, Austin Reed, but it is later revealed that Austin's half-brother and Sami's friend Lucas Roberts (Bryan Dattilo) is his father. Sami and Lucas fight each other for custody, and Will, who is renamed Will Roberts, has a "tumultuous upbringing". As a child, Will endeavors to bring his parents together, whilst his grandma Kate Roberts (Lauren Koslow) schemes to keep them apart. Will sees success when his parents marry in 2007; and his newly united family take the name Horton, to distance themselves from his grandma Kate. Cast in the role when Will was 17, Massey played Will's transition to adulthood and is noted for his portrayal of Will coming out as gay and beginning a same-sex relationship with Sonny Kiriakis (Freddie Smith). Massey's performance and the coming out storyline received high praise: Glamour magazine said it "has never been done better – not on primetime, daytime, or in feature films", and "it's raw, it's touching" and "honest to the core"; and soap journalist Michael Fairman called Massey's performance "beyond sensational". Will and Sonny became the show's first same-sex supercouple (commonly referred to by the portmanteau "WilSon"), and in 2014 Guy Wilson took over the role of Will as Days broadcast the first male gay wedding in US daytime drama history.

The character was graphically murdered in the episode of October 9, 2015, with Will being shown strangled to death, lying dead in the morgue, and being buried and grieved by his family. Viewers reacted with "major" backlash, the decision was highly criticized by professionals, and there was a feeling Days of Our Lives was pandering to anti-gay sentiment in its audience base. In January 2017 Days of Our Lives announced a new head-writer in Ron Carlivati; and in May 2017 Entertainment Weekly reported that Massey was reprising the role of Will. Carlivati indicated, via social media, that Will may not have died after all, and the ensuing storyline showed how Will survived. Massey's new episodes played from September 15, 2017 to September 1, 2020, and he returned again for the Christmas season in December 2020. In the fall of 2021, he reprised his role as Will in the Days spin-off miniseries Days of Our Lives: Beyond Salem, on the Peacock streaming service, and later headlined the spin-off Days of Our Lives: A Very Salem Christmas, in December 2021. Beginning in March 2022, Massey would again start making appearances on the main series, in a recurring role.

For playing Will, Massey won the Daytime Emmy Award for Outstanding Younger Actor in a Drama Series in 2012, 2013, and 2014, becoming the first to win three years in a row in that category, as well as the first to win it for playing a gay character.

== Casting ==
Identical twins Shawn and Taylor Carpenter originally played Will. They were only six weeks old when they started, and they portrayed Will from babyhood until six years old (1995 to 2002). In 2002, Days decided they wanted a trained young actor playing Will, and nine-year-old Darian Weiss was cast, and the character was rapidly-aged three years. A year later (2003), Christopher Gerse took over as Will. Gerse was able to attend regular school while working on Days, including playing on his school's basketball team, just like his character. In 2005, Days were again planning to rapidly age Will, and were "actively seeking out a new actor to play the role" — but the plans were shelved when a new storyline for the younger Will "became available", and Gerse was retained to "preserve the believability of Alison Sweeney and Bryan Dattilo as his parents". Will was not aged again, and Gerse continued until 2007 when Will was temporarily written out (by having the character go to live with his uncle and aunt in Switzerland). In addition, for one episode in January 2008, Gerse provided Will's voice for a phonecall.

In 2009, Will, now sixteen, was reintroduced with actor Dylan Patton. In 2010 the role was again recast with Chandler Massey, the first adult in the role, reportedly to facilitate a new storyline. Before he started, Massey watched as many old episodes as he could find to familiarize himself with the character. In 2013, his younger brother Christian played Will in flashbacks for the episode of February 8. In June 2013, after Massey's second Emmy win, he told reporters he would vacate the role to return to university when his current contract expired. Executive Producer Ken Corday said, "I wish he would stay. I keep telling him to change his mind, don't go away .... The door will always be open here to Chandler. We are not going to recast Will, but I wish him well". Massey said he supported a recast, saying "I don’t want Will and Sonny to break up. I want them to be together forever and go off and get married", and "I want what is best for WilSon!"

In August 2013, it was reported Massey had left Days, and the show had recast due to the character's current storyline "and the timely discovery of new talent"; and in September 2013, it came out that Guy Wilson was cast in the role of Will. Wilson later revealed that when he tested for the role with his costar Freddie Smith, Smith did not know that Wilson was reading for the role of Will, saying "I wasn't supposed to tell him". Wilson said "the whole experience was a soap opera, because everyone knew something that someone else didn't know." Smith said the on-screen switch between Massey and Wilson would happen as quick as the news of the recast, saying, "If you blink and open your eyes, you'll be like, 'Wait, there's a new Will?!' ... It's literally just 'BOOM!'" Wilson first appeared on January 8, 2014, and his last air date was October 13, 2015, with the character portrayed as dead.

On May 8, 2017, Entertainment Weekly announced that Massey was reprising the role of Will, airing in September. Massey told the publication: "I am so excited to be bringing Will back [...] I can't wait for the fans to see what we have planned"; and Wilson expressed "joy" about Will's revival, and happiness that Massey was "back in the saddle as the steward of such an important LGBT icon". Massey made his return in the episode of September 15, 2017. Then in February 2020, it was revealed that Massey was again let go from the serial, with his last appearance airing September 1, 2020; but Executive Producer Ken Corday said Will would be "returning on and off", and Massey re-appeared as Will in the 2020 Christmas season.

In February 2023, it was announced Massey would again exit the role. On October 3, 2024, it was announced Massey would reprise the role, when Will returned during the May 30 episode.

== Development ==
=== Characterization and family ===
When Will is born, his mother Sami is in love with Austin Reed (Austin Peck) and desperately wants to marry him. To this end, she has convinced Austin (and maybe herself too) that Austin is Will's father. So Will begins life with Austin as his father, and the two develop a "strong bond" as father and son. Austin is "beloved" by Will, and their strong bond continues even after it is revealed, two years later, that Will is actually the son of Austin's half-brother, Lucas Roberts.

Initially Will is a quiet child; the twins who initially played Will, and who started on the show as babies, had a tendency to be quiet in front of the cameras. But when, in 2002, Will was aged to nine years and Darian Weiss cast to play him, the character was given an outspoken streak; a trait that was carried on with later portrayals.

Will's parents, Sami and Lucas, fight each other for custody of Will for several years, and Will's chaotic upbringing has an influence on his character. The Sony Pictures web page for Will stated his "turbulent upbringing" made the young Will "moody and suspicious", however About.com's character profile said Will overcame the turmoil of his upbringing, and grew up to be a "kind-hearted" and "level-headed" teenager. In an early interview, Massey said Will is "a great guy .... he kind of had an interesting upbringing, but he turned out to be a really good kid, very forgiving." Massey added: "He doesn’t like being lied to, definitely, but that happens all the time to him. He's very mature for his age. Sometimes it seems like he is the parent in the relationship" (with his mom Sami); Massey said: "He’s like the voice of reason in his family." Will has a relationship with his dad Lucas that is more than father and son – they are "best friends". As a big brother, he is close to his siblings.

Will also has a close relationship with his Grandma Marlena (Deidre Hall), his "most-trusted confidante", who helps him through his struggles to come out. She tells Will he is "one of the bravest men I've ever known". Wilson said Will is "very passionate about everything he does". Will has a long-time best male friend in Tad "T" Stevens – played by Brendan Coughlin, who has played opposite Patton, Massey, and Wilson. With his best female-friend, Gabi Hernandez (Camila Banus), Will is the father of Arianna Horton (initially played by twins Harper and Sydnee Udell, and most recently by Sydney Brower). Arianna's birth was portrayed on the show, as was Will's and his mother's. Will is a great-grandson of the show's original couple, Tom and Alice Horton.

Will begins a romantic pairing with Sonny Kiriakis in September 2012, and they marry in April 2014. Talking about Will and Sonny's relationship, Massey said Will "being insecure" creates drama, but Will and Sonny were "by far the most stable, most logical and loving" couple on the show. Wilson called the couple "great communicators", and "one thing that Will and Sonny have is a sense of humor"; and Massey felt "they complement each other. They cover each other’s flaws and mesh very well.”

Beginning with the marital conflict storyline that kicked off in the fall of 2014, commentators thought Will was written as if he had had a sudden "full-on personality transplant"; and in January 2015, in the midst of Will and Sonny's relationship difficulties, Will breaks his marriage vows, and has sex with his interview subject, the star baseball player Paul Narita (Christopher Sean) – who turns out to be Sonny's ex, and the son of Will's step-grandpa, John Black (Drake Hogestyn). Sonny leaves Will in August 2015. Will endeavours to fix things with Sonny, and they are on the verge of re-uniting when Will is strangled and written out of the show.

At Will's revival in 2017, Massey talked about how the character had changed, saying: "He has grown up to be very much like his mother Sami, which is fun to play. Will can be bitchy, like Sami", adding fun-to-play characteristics can be fun for the audience too, saying "audacity can be very entertaining"; and he later told Soap Opera Digest that Will has "all the impulsiveness and scheming tendencies of Sami". In another interview he said Will can be "very sneaky". Massey also enthused about the characteristics of Will that he loves playing, saying "I love how mad Will can get sometimes! And I love that Will can yell at people. And I love that he is fearlessly protective of Ari, his daughter. And he's not afraid to confront and embrace confrontation. In real life that's discouraged – yelling at people is largely discouraged – but on Days of Our Lives that's how people thrive! I like being able to explore Will's wide range of emotions, and really being able to go there in ways that you can't always in real life."

In the show, Will cheats death, but is left with total amnesia of his life before – and Massey discussed the challenges of playing a character who does not know his own past or family: "It was almost like starting with a blank canvas again. Amnesia’s often associated with some pretty drastic personality changes, so it was a chance to completely recreate Will’s personality in some sense… and yet I also tried to stay faithful to the kind of things that might be hardwired into his body.” In the storyline, amnesiac Will is shocked to learn that he cheated on his husband, and hates thinking he is the type of person who would do that. Wanting to understand, he seeks out Paul to find out how it happened and finds himself "super attracted" to the athletic young man. Amnesiac Will really likes that Paul accepts him as he is, without expectations of who he was before, and he spontaneously kisses Paul on two occasions. Will realizes he has "no business being married to anyone", and in March 2018 he divorces Sonny, whom he does not remember at all. Will and Paul become a couple, (named "Horita" by fans – a mash-up of their surnames, Horton and Narita). Will and Sonny reunite after Will regains his memories.

=== Sexuality and coming out ===
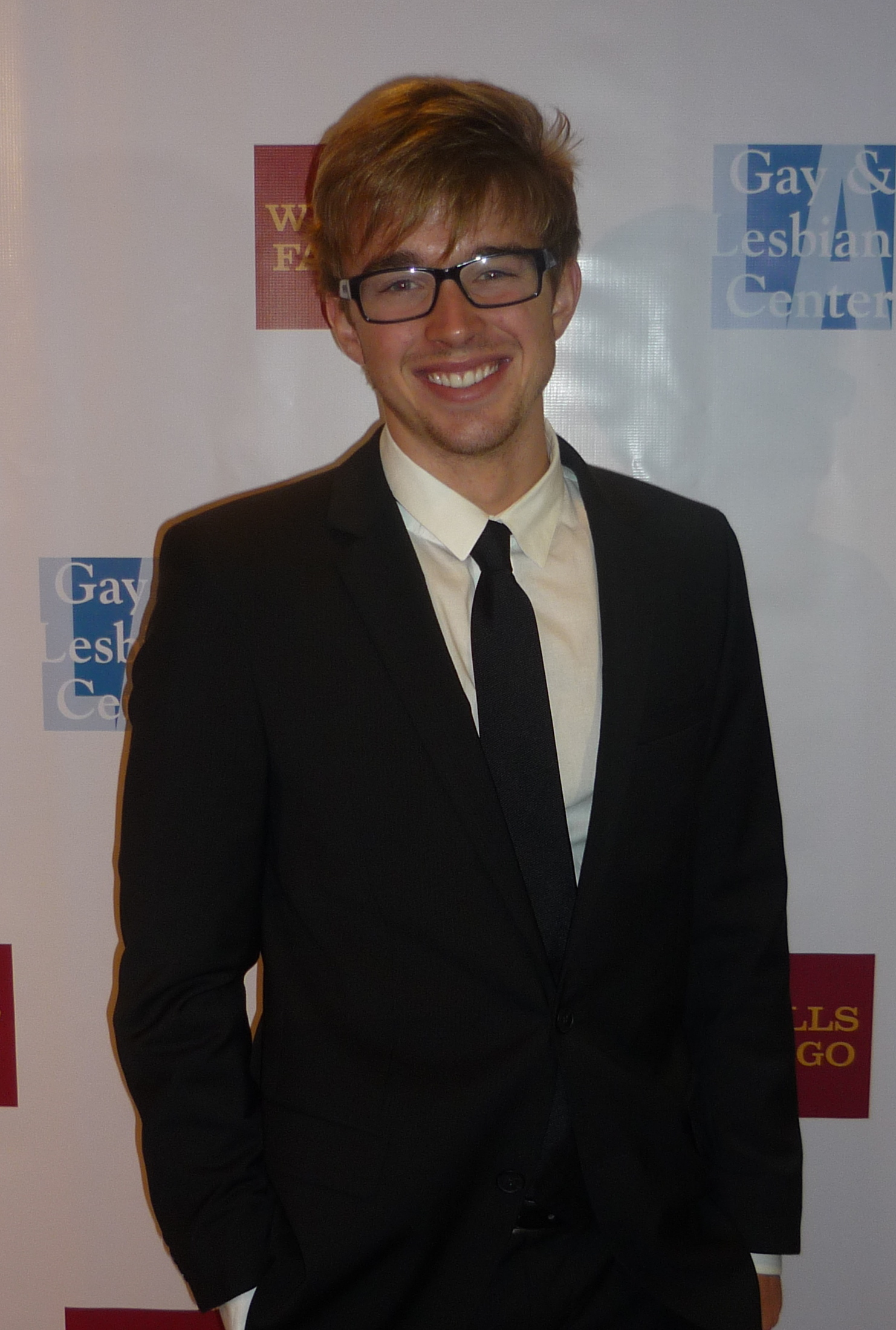
Chandler Massey anticipated Will's coming out story opening minds and promoting tolerance.

When Dylan Patton played him, Will was characterized as straight. Will (aged 16–17) had a girlfriend in Mia McCormick (Taylor Spreitler), and Patton was unaware of any intention to make Will gay. At the start of Chandler Massey's era, Will was also characterized as straight. Massey told Afterbuzz TV "It wasn't till later" and "I guess something that I was doing made them think, 'this guy should be gay! And this will be great!'". Massey explained: "They sat me down and told me 'we have this great story for Will – he's going to be coming out – and we want to let you know that's the direction we're going in.'" After Massey learned of this in February 2011, uncertainty was cast over the storyline, as Days of Our Lives changed head writers and executive producers. Massey said that, while he was not told whether or not they would proceed, he played Will "with his sexuality in mind".

In June 2011, actor Freddie Smith joined the show to play Sonny Kiriakis, an openly gay character. Will and Sonny quickly become friends, and initially, the two characters share a "bromance". Massey told Jacobs of We Love Soaps that Will has a close relationship with Sonny, and Will looks up to and respects Sonny because Sonny has encountered hate but remains confident and comfortable with who he is. Massey said Will admires these qualities in Sonny as "they are rare to see."

In November 2011, Days of Our Lives announced that Will would be coming out as gay. Both NBC (the show's broadcaster in the USA) and Sony Pictures Entertainment (its international distributor) approved of the storyline. Co-Executive Producer Greg Meng said "we are excited to have the encouragement and support from both NBC and Sony to tell the inspiring story of a young man learning who he is as he defines and creates his relationships with others." Massey told Entertainment Weekly that he was "thrilled" to play Will in an "empowering way that will show his struggle to accept who he is", and hoped the storyline would "inspire others to be true to themselves as well". Days showcased the storyline at the Outfest film festival, in March 2012, where Meng told reporters: "We wanted to do a gay storyline for several years. And we didn’t want to do just something splashy or just do a gay story to be telling a gay story. So we needed to find the right time, when it was organic, when it fit in. Will was the right age … and who better with his family history on the show, all the family connections! It just felt right." Meng said Will's story "goes on and on and on. So it’s not a splash!" He added: "We actually have used consultants on the show to help us with the storyline. We used a man who is a volunteer at the Gay and Lesbian Center. So we’ve actually had input from outside people to help us tell the story really accurately, and also so it would hopefully be helpful to somebody who might be watching, going through the same thing."

As the story began, TV Guide's Michael Logan noted Will "is gay and deeply, desperately in denial about it", and that the story would not take a "politically safe route". In the storyline, after Will meets Sonny, he starts rebuffing his then girlfriend Gabi Herdandez's attempts at intimacy; and when she ends her relationship with Will, he has an emotional breakdown and smashes up his aunt's kitchen (the place where Gabi breaks up with him). Massey explained that Will has had a lot to deal with throughout his life, and so Will "has put his sexuality on the back burner and hasn't really dealt with it." According to Massey, Will is "living with self-loathing and disgust over not being able to accept himself", and Will drinks alcohol to make himself feel "less awkward". In the storyline, this leads to Will, boozed-up, kissing one of Sonny's gay friends, a young man called Neil (Jesse Kristofferson) – a first for Will, and a first for Days of Our Lives.

"For months after Will’s coming out, I can’t remember a time where I went out and wasn’t stopped by some darling young man saying things like, ‘You saved me,’ or ‘I didn’t know how to tell my parents [and because of this show] I was able to tell them.'"

— Actress Deidre Hall, portrayer of Will's Grandma Marlena.

Sonny sees them at it, and Will is "super embarrassed" and he seeks his grandma Marlena's advice "so she could make everything better". Will tells her that he thinks he might be gay, and she says "Honey, I think it's okay. Remember that Lady Gaga song you played for me once where she said that sexuality is like the color of your eyes? It’s a thing that you’re born with? Well, I happen to agree with that. You were born with great good looks and charm and wisdom and a wonderful future. And if you’re figuring out something about yourself and acknowledging it, it’s nothing to be ashamed of. It’s a cause for celebration."

In Massey's words, the storyline shows Will's journey from "a young, wet-behind-the-ears kid who felt he was different in some way" to a happily out gay man, who has found "an amazing guy to be with". On the way the storyline deals with the reactions of his friends and family, and how their reactions impact Will (both positively and negatively), and includes one of his best friends rejecting (and then accepting) him, and Will being outed by the media.

=== Revival ===
In reaction to the killing of Will, "fans were outraged in a way rarely seen before in Days history, not comprehending the purpose of killing a legacy character ... who we watched grow from birth in real time onscreen", according to soap journalist Hope Campbell. On January 23, 2017, news broke that Days of Our Lives had a new headwriter in Ron Carlivati. Then on May 8 news broke of Chandler Massey's return as Will, and Carlivati engaged fans on Twitter with an exclaim of "Whaaaattt??? Will Horton is dead! Or is he! How can this be?! Tune in and find out!" Carlivati talked about his motivation to bring back Massey in an interview with Soap Opera Digest, saying "it seemed like the death of Will Horton was not a popular decision and was viewed as a mistake. I wanted to take a look at that and see if there was a way to repair some of that damage.” Executive producer Ken Corday said: "People hated the fact that we killed Will, but we did. Now we’re fixing it." Shortly before his first new episode in September 2017, Massey chatted about Will's revival with the New York Post, saying: "Soaps have their ways, you know? Will certainly wouldn’t be the first person to come back from the dead. They have a medically plausible explanation." Carlivati later revealed that bringing back Massey was one of the first ideas he pitched to Days, and credited creative consultant Ryan Quan with the idea of using Susan Banks (Eileen Davidson) as the "villain" of the story.

== Storylines ==
=== 1995–2008 ===
"Will's paternity drove story for DAYS in the 90's. The character provided a living crucible for the twisted love quadrangle of Sami, Austin, Carrie and Lucas. Will was also a central factor in the delicious, decades-long war Kate and Sami waged against one another."

— Jamey Giddens, Daytime Confidential

Will is born to Sami via Caesarean section. Sami has convinced herself, and everyone else, that Austin is the father, and Austin welcomes Will as his own. But when Will has an accident as a child, his blood is tested, and Sami then realizes that Lucas must be Will's real father. In order not to lose Austin, Sami says nothing, and changes hospital records so no one knows – but her brother Eric (Jensen Ackles) and sister Carrie (Christie Clark) uncover the truth, just before she is to marry Austin. The wedding is stopped, and over the following years, Will is centric to several custody battles between his parents. In addition, he is caught up in the bitter feud between Sami and Kate Roberts (Lauren Koslow), who is the mother of both Austin and Lucas.

Despite his turbulent upbringing, for many years Will is a quiet, eager to please little boy (played by Shawn and Taylor Carpenter). He loves both Austin and Lucas, and he gets upset when he cannot see them, and when his father Lucas is in a coma after a fire. However, after Lucas takes him on holiday to Africa in the summer of 2002, Will (now Darian Weiss, and nine years old) becomes spoiled, bold, and at times obnoxious. He cheekily talks back to his parents and calls them by their first names. He also starts to play rough with other children and ends up hurting his cousin Abby on more than one occasion. Everyone worries that his unstable home life is the cause of his antics.

Eventually his childish behavior subsides. But when a serial killer (the Salem Stalker) begins offing his relatives he gets afraid - and it doesn't help that both his parents are, for a time, suspects! Will (now Christopher Gerse) comes home from school one day with a black-eye, after he has gotten into a fight defending his parents honor. Will does everything he can to get his parents together, so that he can be like "other kids" with a father and mother who live together. Several times it seems that Will's dream is going to come true, but Sami, or his grandma Kate, usually manage to throw a spanner in the works. So when Lucas marries Sami's sister Carrie Brady, and Sami gets engaged to Austin, Will is happy, as he loves both his aunt and uncle, and his parents. But when Sami jilts Austin at the altar, Will cannot cope and runs away to Chicago. Sami fears he has been kidnapped and goes onto the news to plea for his safe return. When Will returns, he is surprised to find out the kerfuffle he has caused.

Carrie has an affair with Austin and they leave Salem (the show's fictional town) together, and Lucas moves back in with Will and Sami. Will is pleased to have his parents together once more, and to his delight, Lucas and Sami become engaged. They marry despite Kate's attempts to stop them, and Will is over-the-moon that his dream has finally come true. But his happiness does not last, as crime lord Stefano DiMera (Joseph Mascolo) tells Sami she has to divorce Lucas and marry Stefano's son EJ DiMera (James Scott) to end the longstanding Brady-DiMera feud. When she refuses, Sami's step-dad (Will's "grandpa John") is killed (or so they think). Sami gives birth to twins, and the girl (Allie) is Lucas's, but the boy (Johnny) is EJ's – and this is due to EJ having raped Sami on a night she had sex with Lucas. Sami decides that the only way she can protect the lives of her family is to marry EJ, but Will is furious that his family is being torn apart by EJ. He is so upset that he does something very rash, that is only revealed years later. After Sami and EJ are married, Will is brought home to Lucas by a police office who finds him underage-drinking. Will doesn't want to be in Salem any more – and wants to go live with his Uncle Austin and Aunt Carrie in Switzerland. His dad agrees to this, and Will leaves America. Six weeks later, Sami phones Will to tell him that his dad has been arrested for the shooting of EJ DiMera.

=== 2009–2013 ===
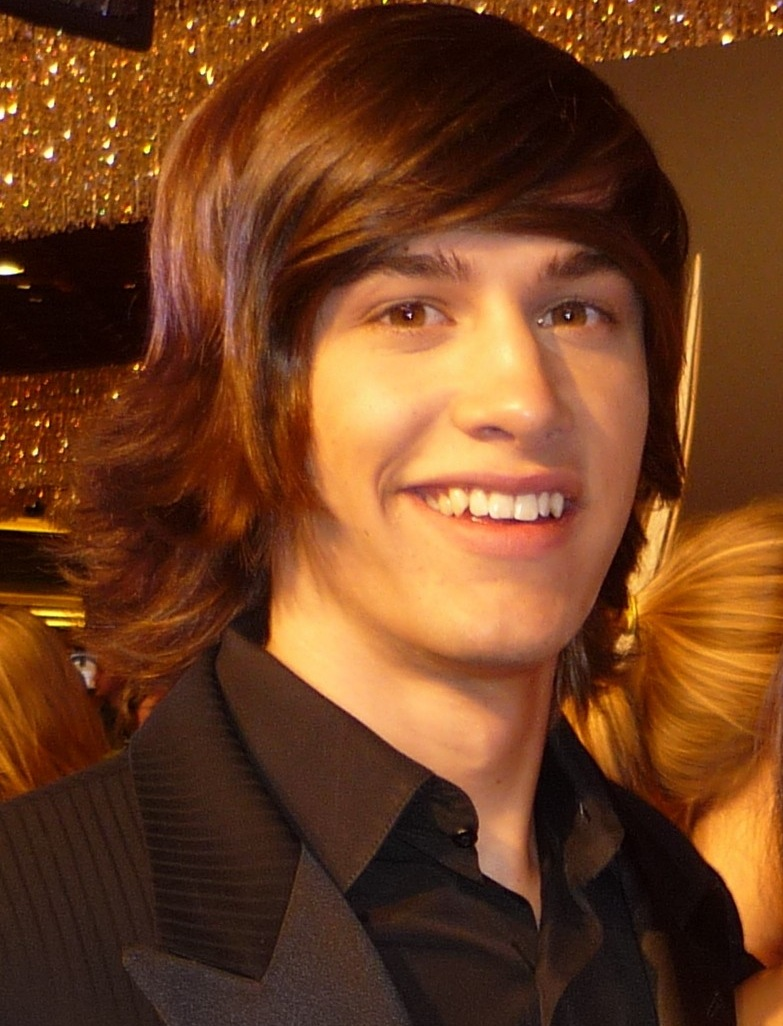
Dylan Patton (pictured) played Will on his 2009 return from Switzerland.

After his dad is released from prison, and his mom divorces EJ, Will (now Dylan Patton, and aged 16) returns to Salem in February 2009. Disappointed his parents are not back together, Will is stunned when his mom tells him she has adopted a new baby – Grace Brady. Sami is lying to Will, as in truth, she got pregnant by EJ, and after divorcing EJ, gave birth to a daughter – and the "adoption" is Sami's way to keep EJ from knowing. Will meets and befriends Mia McCormick (Taylor Spreitler), who like Will, is a new student at school. Mia encourages Will to accept Grace as his sister. Mia and Will start dating, but Will realizes she is keeping secrets. Eventually, it comes out that Mia herself had a baby in secret after getting pregnant by an ex-boyfriend, Chad Peterson-Woods (Casey Deidrick). She gave away her daughter to Nicole Walker (Arianne Zucker), the new wife of EJ DiMera: the plan being that Nicole, who had just miscarried EJ's child (and not told him), would pass the baby off as hers and EJ's. Will and Sami are distraught when Grace contracts meningitis and dies. Will is further hit when Sami tells Will that Grace was his biological (half) sister. Five months later, everyone is shocked to find out Nicole had surreptitiously swapped Mia's baby with Sami's baby (whom she knew was EJ's child) just after their births, and has been bringing up Sami's daughter (named Sydney) from the start. Mia learns her daughter, Grace, is dead. And Sami is re-united with Sydney; and Will meets his new sister.

After a break, Will and Mia start dating again, but when Mia two-times Will with Chad, Will (now Chandler Massey) breaks up with her. Despite starting out as rivals for Mia's love, Will and Chad become friends. Chad also befriends Will's best mate − Tad "T" Stevens (Brendan Coughlin).

Will's mom marries the former FBI agent and policeman Rafe Hernandez (Galen Gering), and Will loves living with them and his three young siblings as a family. His friend Gabi Hernandez (Camila Banus) is Rafe's young sister, and Will begins dating her. They graduate high school together, and on graduation day, they meet Sonny Kiriakis (Freddie Smith), who has just returned to town after traveling the world. Will and Sonny quickly become friends, and Will learns Sonny is gay. After befriending Sonny, Will avoids being intimate with Gabi, and she ends the relationship. Will catches Sami cheating on Rafe with EJ, and in an angry and upset mood, he goes to a party with Sonny, gets drunk and kisses a young man named Neil (Jesse Kristofferson). Will talks about the kiss with his grandmother Marlena Evans (Deidre Hall), who promises him her support and love. His grandma Kate also supports and accepts him, saying she has known for a long time. Will confides in Sonny that he is not ready to come out as gay, and, trying to resist his sexuality, he has a one-night stand with Gabi that results in a pregnancy. As Will enters into a relationship with Sonny, Gabi, with Will's agreement, pretends that the baby has been fathered by her new boyfriend Nick Fallon (Blake Berris), who is Will's second cousin. Will and Sonny split when the paternity of Gabi's baby is revealed, but soon reunite. Nick doesn't want Will involved in the coming baby's life because he is gay, and when Nick discovers that it was Will, not Lucas, who had shot EJ years before, he blackmails Will to sign away his parental rights. After Will and Nick are both attacked by a former prison-mate of Nick's, and Will is shot while trying to save Nick's life, Nick relents – and Will is correctly named as baby Arianna's father on her birth certificate when she is born. When they leave hospital, Gabi and Arianna move in with Will and Sonny, and together they form a three-parent family, with Gabi, Will and Sonny bringing up Arianna together.

=== 2014–2015 ===
Will (Guy Wilson) marries Sonny in April 2014. Gabi rekindles her relationship with Nick, who pressures Gabi to seek a court decision that will drastically limit Will's access to his daughter. Shortly after a court date is set, Nick is shot and killed. Thinking that Sonny did it, Will confesses to protect him. This causes Gabi, the real killer, to admit to killing Nick, who she felt was a threat to her and Arianna. Gabi accepts a plea deal and goes to prison, leaving Arianna in the care of Will and Sonny. In October 2014, Will and Arianna leave Salem temporarily with Sami, who is mourning EJ's death, but they return in December 2014. Will's absence and Sonny's financial troubles with his new club have strained their relationship. Will finds out that Sonny has spent all their money, and Will plunges himself into his work as a journalist. He is assigned to interview injured star baseball player Paul Narita (Christopher Sean), whom Will soon suspects is gay but closeted. Will sees an opportunity to get an important scoop about what it is like to be a gay professional athlete, and also to help another gay man to come out. Recognizing that Will is keen to confirm that he is gay, Paul seduces Will into bed with him. Will is immediately remorseful, but he continues to interview Paul and encourages Paul to come out to the world in his article, sharing his own coming-out story with him. What Will doesn't know is that Paul is Sonny's ex, to whom Sonny had proposed to before he had met Will, and Paul had only declined because he didn't think he could be an out gay athlete. Paul's athletic career is now at an end due to his injury, and unbeknownst to Will, he has already tried to get back together with Sonny. Sonny learns that Paul is Will's interview subject at the same time he hears about Will's infidelity, but he is stabbed in the park as he goes to confront them. Sonny's memory is impaired while he recovers, but when he remembers what Will has done, Sonny rejects Will and leaves Salem to convalesce. When he returns, they struggle to mend their relationship, but Will's infidelity is made public and the Kiriakis family turn against Will. Desperate to repair his marriage and terrified of losing Sonny to Paul, Will does all he can to get Paul to leave town. When this fails, Will tries playing match-maker to pair Paul with Derrick (Spencer Neville). To help things along Will shares his interview notes about Paul with Derrick, to help him win Paul's heart. But Paul realizes Derrick knows stuff he has only told Will. Sonny is furious when he finds out about Will's machinations, and leaves town again, ostensibly to take care of Kiriakis family business. Will is distraught, but he holds onto the hope that they will be re-united. Gabi is released from prison on a technicality, and Will and Arianna welcome her back into their lives.

Ben Weston (Robert Scott Wilson) asks Will to be his best man in his upcoming wedding to Will's cousin, Abigail Deveraux (Kate Mansi). Will calls on Abby at the apartment she shares with Ben, to give her wedding venue information that Sonny had put together when they were engaged. Abby has to go out, but the cable guy is due to come, and Will offers to wait in the apartment. While there, Will reminisces about his own wedding, and calls Sonny (who is in Paris, and a different time zone) and leaves him an emotional voice message, admitting his fault in their breakup, and expressing his unconditional love. Afterwards, Will notices a red necktie in Ben's trash can, which makes Will think of the recent unsolved murders of two local women who were strangled with red neckties (found with their bodies). Ben arrives just as Will is holding the tie and thinking about this. Ben acts alarmingly, and Will realizes Ben is the Necktie Killer. Will tries to leave, but Ben knocks him out. Just as Will is coming to, Ben strangles Will with the tie. Will is apparently killed on October 9, 2015.

Sonny is elated to get Will's message, and immediately gets ready to return to Salem, to reunite with Will. While packing, he is told Will has been murdered. Sonny is devastated, and he returns to Salem to bury his husband rather than reconcile with him. Meanwhile, Ben has made sure Chad (now Billy Flynn) is the prime suspect in the murders; but as Ben's relationship with Abigail self-destructs, he becomes increasingly violent and unhinged. After he nearly murders Abigail and Chad, Ben is arrested and publicly revealed as the Necktie Killer.

=== 2017–2020 ===
In 2017, it is revealed that Will (now Chandler Massey) did not die when he was strangled. When Will had entered Ben's apartment, he was being followed by Susan Banks (Eileen Davidson), who was planning to abduct Will in an act of revenge against Sami, whom she blamed for her son EJ's death. When Ben slipped out after strangling Will, Susan and her associate Dr Wilhelm Rolf (who had revived Sami's step-dad John back when he was thought to be dead) secretly entered, and Dr Rolf found Will to be unconscious but breathing. He then injected Will with something that would make him appear to be dead. After Lucas and Sami had viewed Will in the morgue, Dr Rolf (William Utay) revived Will. It turns out that Will's family unwittingly buried an empty coffin at his funeral, and Will, who had lost all his memories, was taken by Susan, who took care of him, but made him believe that he was her son EJ.

In the fall of 2017, Sonny and Paul are to marry, and Ben escapes from Bayview Sanatarium, and crashes their double wedding with Chad and Abigail to announce that Will is alive. This is met with a high degree of skepticism, but Sonny, who thinks Will died thinking Sonny didn't love him, really wants to know the truth, and says he can't marry Paul until he knows. Sami returns to Salem to find out the truth. When investigation reveals that the claim that Will is alive originates from Dr Rolf, this ignites hope that it is true. The investigation leads to an address in Memphis, where they find Susan. Will is working at a local bar, and Lucas is the first to see him, but he is inebriated, and thinks he is hallucinating and does not realize he has really seen Will. Paul then sees Will, but is afraid to tell people in case he loses Sonny. Eventually he confesses to Sonny, and Sonny and Sami find Will, and discover that he does not recognise them, and does not believe that they are his real family. But John persuades Susan's partner Roger (John Enos), whom Will trusts, to admit to Will what Susan has done. And Will, with some encouragement from Marlena, decides to return to Salem, to find out who he really is.

Even meeting his daughter does not trigger Will's memory. Sami, learning that re-living a traumatic event can trigger memory, has Will assaulted and strangled again by Ben. Absolutely terrified, Will rejects his mom and hates the idea of regaining memories of her as his mother; but then the intervention of Will's Uncle Eric helps bring about a rapprochement with Sami. Sonny realizes he wants to be with Will, and dumps Paul. Sonny endeavours to rebuild a relationship with Will, but Will does not remember their love. Instead, Will crushes on Paul. Will also likes Paul because he does not feel pressured to be the old Will with him, whereas he feels Sonny wants him to be someone he does not remember being. Thinking he may never remember, Will decides to divorce Sonny, believing it best for both of them. Will and Paul become friends, and when Paul suspects John of poisoning Will's Uncle Steve, they investigate together. Their adventure brings them close, and Paul develops feelings for Will. They start dating, and become a couple. Paul encourages Will to apply to be a journalist with the Salem Spectator, and Will gets the job. His first assignment is to investigate the drug that was used to revive him. Will discovers accounts of Dr. Rolf's resurrection experiments, and finds that Rolf was working on a formula to counter the amnesia side-effect. With Paul's help, Will gets the chemical synthesized, and Marlena injects it into Will at the hospital. Initially there is no effect, but later a brief memory of Will's early experience with Sonny flashes into his head. Will wants to take another dose, but the hospital board forbids it; so Will steals the remaining chemical. Worried for him, Paul is upset when he finds out Will intends to inject himself with more, but seeing Will's determination, he injects Will himself. Will gets a few more isolated snippets of memories, and then in August 2018, at the wedding of his grandma Marlena and John Black, he suddenly recalls Marlena marrying him and Sonny. Overwhelmed, he slips away from the wedding. Sonny runs into him, and Will experiences a cascade of memories of their wedding and their love together. Sonny encourages Will, and in an avalanche of recall, Will remembers his family, his love for them, and his entire life. Will remembers everything – and he and Sonny embrace and kiss.

== Reception and impact ==
=== Coming out story ===
Days of Our Lives "first gay kiss" was welcomed by critics. Soap journalist Michael Fairman called it "one of the best daytime television coming out kisses", and said the best part was "Sonny sees the whole thing!" Online blogger Perez Hilton described the scenes as "incredible" and "absolutely wonderful". Pascal Parvis of Têtu noted Will and Neil's kiss was "not a little" and said "what could be better" than the serial's first gay kiss lasting two episodes. Both The Huffington Post and Perez Hilton remarked favorably on Days showing a hot "steamy make-out" session as opposed to just a kiss, and Hilton praised the serial and NBC for not "bowing down to bigoted pressure". Sara Bibel of Xfinity said Will and Neil got the "full soap treatment" (as for heterosexual couples) claiming daytime soap operas in the past have panned the camera away during same-sex kisses. There were also jibes at Days of Our Lives belated featuring of man-to-man intimacy: Joachim Ohnona from Pure People pointed out it took more than ten thousand episodes for Days to air their first gay kiss; and Dan Avery of Queerty said the serial "made television history yesterday when it became the absolutely last show to show two men kissing", and "he’ll get some bed scenes by 2016". Entertainment Weekly's Lynette Rice commented "a first gay kiss is no longer much of a milestone on broadcast TV, but for Days of Our Lives it represents the latest effort to remain relevant", and Xfinity's Bibel noted it was remarkable for a show with a reputation for being "socially conservative".

"Head writers Marlene McPherson and Darrell Ray Thomas Jr. developed the character layer by layer, and then bounced him around like a ball in a pinball machine as he had to deal with the ‘am I gay?’ realization .... Having seen friends go through this before, I've never seen a more honest approach."

— Jessica Radloff, Glamour Magazine

Fairman called Will's coming out story "excellent", "powerful", "emotionally impactful", "relatable", and "believable", and credited Days of Our Lives for keeping it "edgy, dark, and very raw". He said the writers and actors did "a subtle, compelling and beautiful job relating the struggles of young man trying to face and accept who he is, and the ramifications he fears it will have for him with his family and society"; and he also praised the writing for "addressing what parents fear for their child when they come out", saying "a lot of important points were made throughout the dialog." Fairman gave his accolade of "power performances of the week" to Chandler Massey and Deidre Hall (playing Will's grandma Marlena, who helps Will come out), and gave Massey his "Best Overall Performance" of a daytime younger actor in 2012, and praised Massey's performance as "remarkable", "fabulous", and "beyond sensational". Jessica Radloff of Glamour Magazine, said: "In any other actors hands, the story would not carry the same weight. Massey brings a pureness to the role of Will that makes you love him. This is a brilliant young actor who will move you to tears based on a look alone." Massey submitted the episode where Will kisses Neil and talks to Marlena about it to the Daytime Emmys in 2013, and won. Anthony D. Langford of AfterElton.com noted the "terrific chemistry" of Massey and Hall; Rick Nelson of the Star Tribune found the storyline to be addictive viewing; and Hollywood reporter Greg Hernandez wrote "this storyline is a cause for celebration as is this writing and these performances. Bravo to all – and thank you."

Days of Our Lives executive producer Greg Meng talked about the reactions of viewers to a reporter at Outfest 2012: "The reaction has been tremendous. We’ve had some diverse reaction. We’ve had a few people in some different states who’ve been a little concerned that we’re telling this story. But to balance that the reaction has been enormous – in places we couldn’t even imagine."

Chandler Massey spoke about the story's impact in a speech to the Human Rights Campaign Atlanta Gala of May 2018: "We received letters from young men and old men [from] all across the world that said they saw something of themselves in Will Horton. I received a letter from a mom in the Midwest, and she said that she had always known that her son was gay but they never talked about it, or they never even acknowledged it, and she said that seeing Will Horton come out of the closet gave them a roadmap to have that conversation for the very first time."

=== Will and Sonny's romance ===
Will Horton's romance with Sonny Kiriakis was generally well received by critics and the audience. TV Guide said that "while it took 45 years for the show to introduce its first openly gay character (Sonny) and another year and a half to have him find a male partner (Will), the wait was well worth it. This steamy, star-crossed saga has had drama to spare (Paranoia! Blackmail! Impossible parents!), but its real success lies in the fresh, easy charm of these two young men." TV Source Magazine named Will and Sonny Best Couple of 2012 in the Days of Our Lives series, saying "One of the most refreshing things about Will and Sonny’s relationship is it's portrayed just as any heterosexual couple would be. Watching them grow from friends to being in love was one of the highlights of the year for Days." Jeremy Helligar of The Advocate declared Will and Sonny "groundbreaking" because "their domestic stability (and sex life!) is so front-and-center on Days". He compared them favorably with 1992 series Melrose Place, whose gay character Matt Fielding "never got so much as on onscreen kiss", whereas Will and Sonny "are regularly shown in flagrante delicto and basking shirtless in post-coitus afterglow." "How far we've come", he exclaimed.

=== Wedding ===
Greg Hernandez called the wedding "great, great stuff", and said he was "wiping away tears left and right". He confessed, "I used to get lost in fantasy as a teenager that I would marry a guy" and explained how his imagined festivities were very much like Will and Sonny's wedding. He was thrilled that "with gay marriage becoming legal in a growing number of states" his fantasy "can actually come true for young gay people dreaming about that today", and he said "that is why I will be forever grateful to this soap for giving us this episode, this wedding that was filled with love and supportive family and friends. It’s the way it should be and always should have been", and he "loved every minute of it". Michael Fairman declared it the "best wedding" of 2014, and praised it for being "beautifully acted", with "inspired writing" and "touching speeches", saying "every time we watch this we need hankies".

When on June 26, 2015, the Supreme Court of the United States ruled to make same-sex marriage a right across all states of the US, soapcentral.com published an article celebrating the Supreme Court's ruling with a look back at the first same-sex marriages shown in USA soap operas: the first female-female marriage (Bianca and Reese on All My Children) and the first male-male marriage (Will and Sonny on Days of Our Lives), saying both were "incredibly special". Commenting on the importance of the couple at the time of Will's revival, Krystyn Burtt of SheKnows said, "The storyline began to play out in 2012, when few states had marriage equality. By the time the Supreme Court of the United States ruled that same-sex marriage was a right in all 50 states on June 26, 2015, Will and Sonny were already married. Days of Our Lives had shown fans how important all types of love stories were and how they deserved representation on daytime TV."

=== Marital conflict and triangle ===
In Soap Opera Digest's "Best and Worst" end-of-year reviews, Will and Sonny got "Worst Marital Conflict" in both 2014 and 2015. Digest criticized the writing, saying "it was not the write stuff". Greg Hernandez said it was as if Will had had a "sudden personality transplant" and "none of it feels true"; and Fairman said the character became "unrecognizable" in his actions. Soap Opera Digest complained that Will "inexplicably succumbed" to Paul's advances and that it added "insult to injury" when it was subsequently revealed that Will had a previous episode of infidelity when off the show. They remarked: "when Will and Sonny tied the knot, it was a groundbreaking moment based in love, which is why it is impossible to comprehend why the show spent the better half of the last two years trying so hard to unravel this historic union". But Cyd Zeigler of Outsports was complimentary, saying the gay love triangle showed the writers' interest in treating a gay couple just like any other, and Fairman said the triangle drove interest in the show, being the best story on at the time; and Hernandez found Will and Paul' "hot together", and their sex scene "memorable and steamy".

=== Murder ===
Former Days writer Kola Boof, tweeted "I think the killing of Will Horton is one of the biggest dumbest mistakes in Days history. On many levels." Soap Opera Digest condemned the killing, saying it was "sick and violent", and "it got people talking all right, but not in a good way," and whilst realizing the show needed to boost ratings, "killing off a legacy character like Will was not at all the way to do it." They said "Will holds a special place in the hearts of Days viewers", because they watched him "grow up on-screen after his birth in 1995", and "his sensitive coming out tale in 2012" added to his "cherished status". TV Guide Magazine's Michael Logan tweeted "Killing Will is a dumb-ass move. He's not just a legacy character & LGBT icon, this crazy hot mess was storytelling gold. Insane." Logan expanded in his end-of-year review, saying it was "dead wrong" and "idiotic" and "the murder of Days of Our Lives’ landmark gay character Will Horton via brutal strangulation meant the loss of an insanely fascinating fire-starter who had kept the show spinning for years," adding "many are calling the move homophobic."

Michael Fairman labelled the killing as "The Worst Decision" in soaps in 2015, saying "to kill the legacy character of Will Horton by having him brutally murdered ... sent a message to the LGBT community, and the viewers, that caused a major negative backlash." Fairman gave the runner-up for "Worst Decision 2015" to Days not having Will's husband upfront at his funeral, "Will’s husband Sonny was relegated to the second row ... Not cool!" Tony S., a columnist at soapcentral.com, said the family photograph of Will, Sonny and Arianna blowing off Will's grave "came across as a promise from someone in charge to homophobic fans ... as, 'Congrats, you won't have to worry about their kind anymore.'"

James Lott Jr of AfterBuzz TV said Will's murder was a "jump the shark moment", and "I just couldn't believe it!" He said Will was "a character that has been on since pre-birth", and is "related to almost everyone on the show", and "I mean this is really ridiculous to me: to kill Will Horton!" Lott described his experience watching it happen and thinking "you're ruining the show right now – this is the biggest mistake you could have made," and "as the life was coming out of him, the life was coming out of me at the same time, as a long-time viewer." Lott's Afterbuzz TV colleague Tony Moore called Will's death "gruesome" and "hard to watch", and bemoaned "the whole gay storyline is just going to be done away with." He criticized the writing, in that Will didn't run, cry for help, or fight back. Tony S did too, writing "Will was just as fit as any other Salem heartthrob, but was so discombobulated by a toss to the fridge that he couldn't fight back. Alllll riiiggghhhttt", and "he had a child and husband to live for – to fight for – yet the writers seemed like he couldn't die fast enough." Several commentators criticized the lack of repercussions in the story. Laurisa, a columnist at soapcentral.com, wrote "the people of Salem were no more invested in solving this crime than they were before Will's death." Michael Logan wrote "Will’s death was pretty much forgotten by the people of Salem within days, even by his own mother," and Soap Opera Digest said "the end game" was "nil", and "people were giddily partying to honor Salem's birthday party mere weeks after his graphic murder!"

Mark J Freeman of Afterbuzz TV talked in strongly critical terms about pandering to viewers who dislike seeing gay characters on TV: "instead of just saying 'a majority of middle america doesn't like the gay storyline: let's kill them' ... how about being the change?" Freeman framed it in an historical context, saying, "there are things in American history, that a majority of people ... thought was right, and it didn't make it right, ... and it doesn't mean that change should not have happened."

"Does anyone in the TV industry know or care that Days of Our Lives exterminated their iconic gay legacy character and pretty much abolished all things gay on the show, just in time to celebrate 50 years on the air?"

— Question addressed by Matt Roush in TV Insider's Ask Matt column

Fans expressed outrage via social media and letters to Soap Opera Digest. Social media fan reactions were published in Hollywood Life, and 2paragraphs.com, with one fan saying: "Will Horton was a beacon in the face of bullying and persecution. Today, you expect LGBTQ youth to watch his life strangled away". Soap Opera Digest printed a letter saying: "In my 30-plus years as a Days viewer, I have never been more disgusted by a storyline than the violent strangulation death of a gay legacy character ... As the mother of a young son who was struggling with his sexuality, we were able to watch Will come out, fall in love, and get married ... Now I regret ever encouraging him to watch."

In another published tweet a fan thanked Alison Sweeney (who plays Will's mother, Sami Brady) for "voicing our disgust" to the killing of Will. Sweeney told Soap Opera Digest: "I was angry. I felt betrayed and hurt", and "this particular story point is something that I just don't agree with and I didn't from the moment they told me. And I don't understand why they did it." Sweeney said: "it breaks my heart that there is no Will anymore."

=== Return ===
Will's revival was welcomed by critics and fans. Kristyn Burtt of SheKnows wrote: "The return of Chandler Massey to Days of Our Lives this fall has been a huge watershed moment for NBC. The character of Will Horton and his love story with Sonny Kiriakis, played by Freddie Smith, was a groundbreaking one on television. It really is a romance for the ages." Hope Campbell of Soap Hub said the killing of Will "ushered in a downward spiral for the soap just before its 50th anniversary that never stopped – until now. Welcome back, Will, and welcome back, Sami;" and soap journalist Janet Di Lauro named the resurrection of Will as the first of five ways Ron Carlivati had "revitalized" Days and made it "better than ever".

Jeremy Helligar of Queerty commented favorably on the show's portrayal of its gay characters, saying: "Days is making us [gays] look better than we ever have in daytime. We no longer exist just to be sassy and sexless or tortured and tormented", instead Days gay character stories "could play out with straight characters. And when it comes to romance, they get to do a lot more than hug" ... "Real-life gays don’t get this much action on Grindr, Scruff, and Saturday night combined. Days lets [gays] do all the things its straight characters do, including come back from the dead, make out and make love in the afternoon. In some ways, it’s more progressive than Will & Grace."

The story event of Will regaining his life's memories and his love for Sonny attracted particular praise. Soapcentral.com said "the WilSon magic was back. And it was just lovely. I was so happy for Will as he remembered his life and all that's good about it". Fairman felt Massey's performance "was everything anyone could have hoped it would be and more", and thought viewers may have "witnessed quite possibly Emmy number four heading Massey’s way", and he reported that "many took to social media to say how moved to tears they were by Chandler’s work".

In 2020, Charlie Mason from Soaps She Knows placed Will and Sonny jointly at #24 on a list of the 35 most memorable characters from Days of Our Lives, commenting "Judge us if you must for making Freddie Smith and Chandler Massey’s gay supercouple share an entry. After all that they’ve been through, we just couldn’t bear to separate the harried marrieds again."

== Awards and nominations ==
Darian Weiss, Christopher Gerse, and Dylan Patton, were all nominated for Young Artist Awards for their portrayal of Will. Gerse was nominated twice – in 2004 and 2005. In 2010, Patton earned a nomination for a Daytime Emmy Award for Outstanding Younger Actor in a Drama Series, and the next year (2011), Chandler Massey was nominated. Massey went on to win the Daytime Emmy for Outstanding Younger Actor in a Drama Series – never before won for a gay character – three years in a row, in 2012, 2013, and 2014. Massey earned nominations in 2018 and 2020 for the Daytime Emmy Award for Outstanding Supporting Actor in a Drama Series.

Days of Our Lives won the GLAAD Media Award for Outstanding Daily Drama in 2012, 2013, 2014, and 2015, in recognition of the characters and stories of Sonny Kiriakis and Will Horton and related characters. After Will's revival, Days received a nomination in the 2018 awards season.

== See also ==
- Same-sex marriage in the United States
- Will Horton and Sonny Kiriakis
- Lucas Roberts and Sami Brady
- Billy Douglas (One Life to Live)
- Luke Snyder
- Luke Snyder and Noah Mayer
- List of LGBT firsts by year
- List of LGBT characters in soap operas
- List of LGBT characters in television and radio
