= Elisa Camahort =

Writer, speaker, consultant

- Pronunciation: "Eh-lee-sa Ca-ma-hort"
- Other name: Elisa Camahort Page
- Occupation: Entrepreneur/Writer/Speaker/Consultant
- Employer: self-employed
- Known for: Co-founder of BlogHer and author of Roadmap for Revolutionaries

Elisa Camahort is an entrepreneur, writer, speaker, and consultant best known as the co-founder and COO of global women’s media company BlogHer and co-author of Road Map for Revolutionaries: Resistance, Activism, and Advocacy for All.

== Career ==
Elisa Camahort was the co-founder and COO of BlogHer, and later the Chief Community Officer of SHE Media. She is presently the host of the podcast, The Op-Ed Page with Elisa Camahort Page, serves on the board of directors of Our Hen House, and is also a longtime member of the SXSW Interactive programming committee.

=== BlogHer ===
Camahort and her co-founders, Jory Des Jardins and Lisa Stone, started BlogHer in 2005 as a side project producing a conference for women bloggers, but they quickly formalized BlogHer as a company after the first event sold out and sparked intense interest. They subsequently bootstrapped the company for two years before raising funding in 2007. Ultimately, BlogHer sold to SHE Media in 2014.

BlogHer became a national women's media brand with 36 million participating every week, and 15 million with their own blogs. By 2012, the BlogHer platform attracted nearly 92 million visitors monthly, that in combination with around 3,000 blogs on Pinterest and Facebook, BlogHer had created enough leverage to obtain the eyes of high-end brands, marketers and advertisers. By the end of 2013, a gross amount of $100 million worth of advertising had been sold by BlogHer to major brands allowing them to in turn pay bloggers 25 million in their share of advertising revenues.

=== SHE Media ===
In October 2015, Camahort became SHE Media's Chief Community Officer. She left SHE Media in June 2017 and secured a book deal for the book she co-authored, Road Map for Revolutionaries, in the same month.

== Published works ==
=== Road Map for Revolutionaries: Resistance, Activism, and Advocacy for All ===
Elisa Camahort and her co-authors Carolyn Gerin and Jamia Wilson wrote and published Road Map for Revolutionaries: Resistance, Activism, and Advocacy for All in September 2018, which provides the resources needed to help you feel safer, more empowered, invested in, and intrinsic to the American experiment. The book is centered around activism and how to support the "greater good" and the "big picture". It offers advice on how to protest practically and how to stand up to any form of injustice, whether it be local or national in addition to giving a look on how to channel feelings of political or social frustration. It quickly gained popularity, with The Guardian describing it as, "a handbook for people of all ages and backgrounds who are ready to step into advocacy and activism, but don’t know where to begin."

== Personal life ==
Since Camahort's youth, her mentor and role model in the business world was her mother. Additionally, when Camahort was starting out in the business world, her boss, "vice president of marketing", and her "director of product management" were also her mentors in the business world. Camahort watched her mother climb the corporate ladder, and she wanted to do the same. Soon, she reached the top and discovered that she enjoyed having "control, and accountability and ownership" of being at the top of her own corporate ladder Camahort also likes the idea of people using a social media or blogging in order to shape their life and be able to find support from others. On August 5, 2016, Kim Kardashian met with Camahort to discuss Kim Kardashian's public lifestyle.

== Honours, decorations, awards, and distinctions ==
- BlogHer’s co-founders — Elisa Camahort, Jory Des Jardins, and Lisa Stone — were listed alongside the likes of Marissa Mayer and Arianna Huffington as the Most Influential Women in Web 2.0 by Fast Company in 2008.
- In 2008, she and her BlogHer co-founders were picked among the seven most influential people in new media by Katie Couric in Forbes.
- Camahort was honored as an NCWIT Hero in 2008.
- In 2013, Elisa Camahort was named one of AlwaysOn’s Power Players in Technology Business Media.
- She was named a C-Suite Network Social Media Legend in 2015 by The C-Suite Network.
- In 2016, Camahort was recognized as a Mentor in the 2016 Folio: Top Women in Media awards.
- Camahort is also described as an influential person in Silicon Valley.
- Elisa Camahort is recognized as co-founding "the United States’ largest blog network."
