= SHE Media =

American media company

- Industry: Lifestyle and entertainment digital media
- Founded: 1999
- Key people: Samantha Skey, CEO
- Parent: Penske Media Corporation
- Website: www.shemedia.com

SHE Media (formerly known as SheKnows Media) is an American digital media company. It operates the website properties BlogHer, SheKnows, STYLECASTER, Soaps.com and HelloFlo. It has been a brand of Penske Media Corporation since 2018.

== History ==
SHE Media was founded as SheKnows.com in 1999 by Kyle Cox, Betsy Gartrell-Judd, and Nancy J. Price as a subset of Price and Bailey's online media company Myria Media.. It was designed for "21st-century mothers" with blogs, videos, and articles about entertainment, lifestyle, and parenting written by industry experts, journalists, and published authors. SheKnows.com was acquired by Evolve Media in 2012, which in turn sold it to Great Hill Partners. In 2014, it acquired #BlogHer and STtyleCaster. In 2016, it acquired HelloFlo, a website dedicated to women's health.

The company was acquired by Penske Media in March 2018 for $40 million. Samantha Skey was named CEO of the company in July of that year. SheKnows.com rebranded as SHE Media in November 2018. As of that date, it had 60 million unique monthly visitors.

== Overview ==
SHE Media publishes entertainment, fashion, health, career, parenting, and food multi-media content aimed at a female audience. SHE Media is the creator of the annual #Femvertising Awards, which pay recognition to brands and agencies that produce pro-female advertising. Its #BlogHer brand hosts a series of large conferences for women entrepreneurs and content creators each year.

== Properties ==
=== SheKnows.com ===
SHE Media defines SheKnows.com as a site dedicated to "providing women with the practical service they need and the daily inspiration they want to live full, authentic lives." As the flagship property of SHE Media, SheKnows.com’s editorial and branded content spans topics that include food, family, health, beauty, entertainment, and more. The site was a Webby Best in Lifestyle Site honoree in 2017. In 2015, SheKnows.com received an OMMA Award in the Family/Parenting/Women’s Interest Category. In 2013, it was listed in Forbes’ Top Websites for Women list.

=== #BlogHer ===
On November 3, 2014, the company acquired #BlogHer, which brought a large network of women content creators and a legacy conference and event revenue stream to the business. The deal was estimated by Ad Age to be worth between $30 and $40 million. #BlogHer co-founders Jory Des Jardins, Elisa Camahort, and Lisa Stone joined SHE Media as executives. The merger offers #BlogHer customers access to SHE Media's multi-media resources and increases the company's share of women's presence on the internet.

Past speakers have included Serena Williams, Kim Kardashian, Gwyneth Paltrow, Gabrielle Union, Amy Schumer, Jessica Alba, Chelsea Clinton, Carla Hall, Sheryl Crow, Martha Stewart, Ava DuVernay, Arianna Huffington, and more.

=== STYLECASTER ===
On August 15, 2014, SHE Media purchased STYLECASTER Media Group in Manhattan to broaden its customer base, complement its existing market, and better target "young, cosmopolitan, and fashion-forward" women. It expected to realize $50 million in revenue from the combined organization, according to The Wall Street Journal, which reported that the $10 million purchase was an all-stock transaction. Founders Ari Goldberg and David Goldberg initially became part of the SheKnows organization. Editor-in-Chief Laurel Pinson also moved to SHE Media from STYLECASTER. The site was a Webby Award nominee and honoree for the Best Fashion & Beauty Site in 2015, 2016 and 2017.

=== HelloFlo ===
In April 2016, SHE Media acquired HelloFlo, a website designed to normalize the conversation about women’s and girls' bodies at every stage of life and the creator of viral videos like "Camp Gyno", "First Moon Party" and "A Visit from Aunt Flo". In 2017, HelloFlo was the winner of a Webby Award for Best Health Site. That same year, it received an OMMA Award for Best Health/Wellness site.

=== The #Femvertising Awards ===
The #Femvertising Awards, created by SHE Media, honor excellence in pro-female advertising. Based on a term now coined by CEO Samantha Skey in an article published in MediaPost in 2014, SHE Media launched the #Femvertising Awards the following year to celebrate ads that challenge social and gender norms through advertising. Since 2015, the term Femvertising and the #Femvertising Awards have been covered by a variety of media outlets, including NBC Nightly News, Adweek, The Huffington Post and more.

=== Hatch ===
SHE Media launched Hatch in 2015 to explore social issues impacting Generation Z.

Hatch has been published in news outlets that include CNN, TIME, AdWeek, Upworthy, Buzzfeed, and more. In October 2017, Good Morning America featured the Hatch #DigitalDetox workshop, in which a group of 12- and 13-year-olds who belong to the program shared what it was like to give up social media, online games, streaming video, and texting for an entire week.
