= Dylan Patton =

American actor

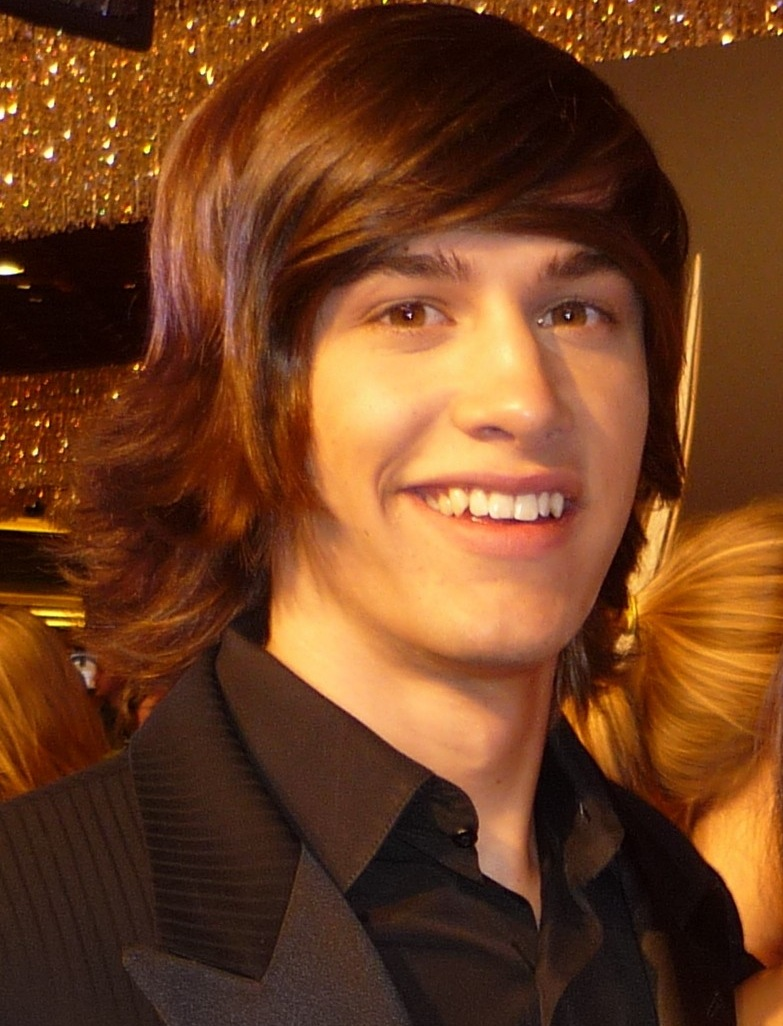
- Patton at the Daytime Emmy Awards, June 27, 2010
- Born: Dylan Michael Patton; July 13, 1992 (age 33); Denton, Texas, U.S.
- Occupation: Actor
- Years active: 2002–2013

Dylan Michael Patton (born July 13, 1992) is an American former actor and child model. He is best known for portraying the role of Will Horton on the NBC soap opera Days of Our Lives from February 27, 2009, to January 20, 2010.

He currently plays Ultimate Frisbee for the Los Angeles Organization of Ultimate Teams called Kong and does production assistant work in art department.

== Career ==
In early 2009 he was cast in the role of Will Horton on the NBC soap opera "Days of Our Lives for 4 years, but due to the change in story line, after playing the role for eleven and a half months, the role was recast and he was let go from the show. In 2010, he was nominated for an award at the 37th annual Daytime Emmy Awards in the Outstanding Younger Actor category for his role on Days.

== Personal life ==
Patton was born in Texas, United States on July 13, 1992. His family consists of his parents David Patton, Deborah Patton and younger brother Julian. He studied at Agoura High School. He spent his youngest years in Texas, then moved to Los Angeles to pursue his acting career. On May 14, 2013, Patton was arrested for selling cocaine out of his parents' Agoura Hills home in California, and on June 13, 2013, he was sentenced to three years probation after pleading no contest.

== Awards and nominations ==
=== Nominations ===
2008

- Young Artist Awards (Cold Case)

2010

- Daytime Emmy Awards (Days of Our Lives)

2011

- Young Artist Awards (Days of Our Lives)

== Filmography ==
Film
Year	Film	Role	Notes
2005	Paradise, Texas	Tyler Cameron	Lead role
2005	O' Best Beloved, Six Honest Men	Oliver Murphy	short film
2005	Sheeba	Clay Thomas	Lead role
2009	First Strike	Dustin Tyler	Film
2013	Romey and Julie	Romey	Short movie
Television
Year	Title	Role	Notes
2002	Our Family	Dakota Manning	Pilot
2005	That's So Raven	Justin Banks	1 episode
2007	Cold Case	Young Matt Merriman	1 episode
2009-2010	Days of Our Lives	Will Horton	211 episodes
