= List of Days of Our Lives cast members =

Days of Our Lives is a long-running American television soap opera that streams on the streaming service Peacock. Created by Ted and Betty Corday, the series premiered on November 8, 1965. The longest-running cast member is Suzanne Rogers, who has portrayed Maggie Horton since August 20, 1973, making her one of the longest-tenured actors in American soap operas. Original cast member, Frances Reid, was previously the soap's longest-running cast member, portraying Horton family matriarch, Alice Horton, from 1965 to 2007. Actresses Susan Seaforth Hayes and Deidre Hall, who portray Julie Olson Williams and Marlena Evans, are the second and third longest tenured actors on Days of Our Lives, joining in December 1968 and June 1976, respectively. The following list is of cast members who are on the show: the main, recurring and guest cast members, as well as those who are debuting, departing or returning to the serial.

== Cast ==
=== Main cast ===
Main cast members
| Actor | Character | Duration |
|---|---|---|
| Tyler Joseph Andrews | Theo Carver | 2025–present |
| Carson Boatman | Johnny DiMera | 2021–present |
| Raven Bowens | Chanel Dupree | 2021–present |
| Raven Bowens | Allie Horton | 2022 |
| Rachel Boyd | Sophia Choi | 2025–present |
| Brandon Butler | Zack Brady | 2025 |
| Brandon Butler | Mason Whitfield | 2026 |
| Mary Beth Evans | Kayla Brady Johnson | 1986–1992, 2006–present |
| Mary Beth Evans | Kassandra Loved | 2023 |
| Dan Feuerriegel | EJ DiMera | 2021–present |
| Dan Feuerriegel | Johnny DiMera | 2022 |
| Conner Floyd | Chad DiMera | 2026 |
| Cole Gersmeyer | Thomas DiMera | 2026 |
| Linsey Godfrey | Sarah Horton | 2018–present |
| Linsey Godfrey | Kristen DiMera | 2021 |
| Linsey Godfrey | Ava Vitali | 2022 |
| Linsey Godfrey | Gwen Rizczech | 2022 |
| Deidre Hall | Marlena Black | 1976–1987, 1991–2009, 2011–present |
| Deidre Hall | Samantha Evans | 1992, 2008 |
| Deidre Hall | Hattie Adams | 2004, 2016–2020, 2024–2025 |
| Jackée Harry | Paulina Price | 2021–present |
| Susan Seaforth Hayes | Julie Olson Williams | 1968–1984, 1990–1994, 1996, 1999–present |
| Leo Howard | Tate Black | 2024–present |
| Cherie Jimenez | Gabi DiMera | 2024–present |
| Abigail Klein | Stephanie Johnson | 2022–present |
| Lauren Koslow | Kate Roberts | 1996–present |
| Lauren Koslow | Kristen DiMera | 2021 |
| Lauren Koslow | Lorna | 2023 |
| Martha Madison | Belle Black | 2004–2008, 2015–present |
| Martha Madison | Jan Spears | 2021 |
| Sydney Malakeh | Sydney DiMera | 2026 |
| Jacob Martinez | Javi Hernandez | 2026 |
| Eric Martsolf | Brady Black | 2008–present |
| AnnaLynne McCord | Cat Greene | 2024–present |
| Stephen Nichols | Steve Johnson | 1985–1990, 2006–2009, 2015–present |
| Stephen Nichols | Stefano DiMera | 2019–2020 |
| Stephen Nichols | Marlena Evans | 2021 |
| Emily O'Brien | Gwen Von Leuschner | 2020–2023, 2025–present |
| Emily O'Brien | Tiffany Rizczech | 2021 |
| Emily O'Brien | Theresa Donovan | 2023–2025 |
| Ashley Puzemis | Holly Jonas | 2023–present |
| James Reynolds | Abe Carver | 1981–present |
| Greg Rikaart | Leo Stark | 2018–2020, 2022–present |
| Suzanne Rogers | Maggie Kiriakis | 1973–present |
| Sal Stowers | Lani Price | 2015–present |
| Josh Taylor | Chris Kositchek | 1977–1987 |
| Josh Taylor | Roman Brady | 1997–present |
| Paul Telfer | Damon | 2015 |
| Paul Telfer | Xander Cook Kiriakis | 2015–present |
| Robert Scott Wilson | Ben Weston | 2014–2023 |
| Robert Scott Wilson | Alex Kiriakis | 2022–present |

=== Recurring and guest cast ===
Recurring and guest cast members
| Actor | Character | Duration |
|---|---|---|
| Kristian Alfonso | Hope Williams Brady | 1983–1987, 1990, 1994–2020, 2023–present |
| Kristian Alfonso | Gina Von Amberg | 1998–2001, 2012, 2017–2020 |
| Miles Anderson | Foster | 2025–present |
| Lamon Archey | Centerville cop | 2011 |
| Lamon Archey | New dad | 2013 |
| Lamon Archey | Eli Grant | 2017–present |
| Matthew Ashford | Jack Deveraux | 1987–1993, 2001–2007, 2011–2012, 2016–present |
| Brandon Beemer | Shawn Brady | 2006–2008, 2016–present |
| Grayson Berry | Clint Rawlings | 2023–present |
| Pippa Blaylock | Charlotte DiMera | 2026 |
| Elia Cantu | Jada Hunter | 2022–present |
| George DelHoyo | Orpheus | 1986–1987, 2016, 2020–present |
| Vico Escorcia | Arianna Horton | 2026 |
| Judi Evans | Becki | 1983 |
| Judi Evans | Adrienne Johnson Kiriakis | 1986–1991, 2007–2008, 2010–2020, 2025 |
| Judi Evans | Bonnie Lockhart | 2003–2007, 2017–2018, 2020–present |
| Judi Evans | Nick Fallon | 2023 |
| Kennedy Garcia | Felicity Greene | 2024–present |
| Galen Gering | Rafe Hernandez | 2008–present |
| Galen Gering | Rafe Hernandez 2 | 2011, 2024–2025 |
| Galen Gering | Marlena Evans | 2021 |
| Stacy Haiduk | Jane Smith | 2010 |
| Stacy Haiduk | Susan Banks | 2018–2019, 2021–present |
| Stacy Haiduk | Kristen DiMera | 2018–present |
| Stacy Haiduk | Sister Mary Moira Banks | 2022 |
| Stacy Haiduk | Nick Fallon | 2023 |
| AlexAnn Hopkins | Joy Wesley | 2024–present |
| Tina Huang | Josie Jordan | 2008–2009 |
| Tina Huang | Melinda Trask | 2020–present |
| Leann Hunley | Anna DiMera | 1982–1986, 2007–2010, 2017–2023, 2025–present |
| Victoria Konefal | Ciara Brady | 2017–present |
| Wally Kurth | Justin Kiriakis | 1987–1991, 2009–present |
| Clyde Kusatsu | Wei Shen | 2022–present |
| John-Paul Lavoisier | Philip Kiriakis | 2015–2016, 2023–present |
| Colton Little | Andrew Donovan | 2023–present |
| Franco LoPresti | Dante Vitali | 2026 |
| Kyle Lowder | Brady Black | 2000–2005 |
| Kyle Lowder | Rex Brady | 2018–present |
| Chandler Massey | Will Horton | 2010–2014, 2017–2023, 2025–present |
| Casey Moss | JJ Deveraux | 2013–2020, 2022, 2024–present |
| Lorelei Olivia Mote | Rachel Black | 2026 |
| Shi Ne Nielson | Kaya | 2005 |
| Shi Ne Nielson | Amy Choi | 2024–present |
| Hank Northrop | Liam Selejko | 2025–present |
| Michael Ocampo | Gus | 2026 |
| Stephen Oyoung | Jason Choi | 2026 |
| Thaao Penghlis | Tony DiMera | 1981–1985, 2007–2009, 2019–2023, 2025–present |
| Thaao Penghlis | Andre DiMera | 1983–1984, 1993–1996, 2002–2005, 2007, 2015–2019, 2022 |
| Peter Reckell | Bo Brady | 1983–1987, 1990–1992, 1995–2012, 2015–2016, 2022–present |
| Peter Porte | Dimitri Von Leuschner | 2023, 2026 |
| Kyle Pryor | Dominic Marino | 2026 |
| Melissa Reeves | Jennifer Horton | 1985–1995, 2000–2006, 2010–2022, 2024–present |
| Jonah Robinson | Mark Greene | 2024–present |
| Christopher Sean | Paul Narita | 2014–2018, 2023–present |
| Charles Shaughnessy | Shane Donovan | 1984–1992, 2002, 2010, 2012–2013, 2016–2017, 2023, 2025 |
| Charles Shaughnessy | Drew Donovan | 1988, 2017 |
| Alison Sweeney | Adrienne Johnson | 1987 |
| Alison Sweeney | Sami Brady | 1993–2015, 2017–present |
| Alison Sweeney | Colleen Brady | 2007–2008 |
| Louis Tomeo | Aaron Greene | 2024–present |
| Richard Wharton | Wilhelm Rolf | 2022–present |

== Cast changes ==
=== Debuting cast ===
Debuting cast members
| Actor | Character | Date | Ref. |
|---|---|---|---|
| Sofia Mattsson | Chloe Lane | 2027 | |
| Brytni Sarpy | Character TBA | 2027 | |

=== Departing cast ===
Departing cast members
| Actor | Character | Date | Ref. |
|---|---|---|---|
| Carson Boatman | Johnny DiMera | TBA | |
| Raven Bowens | Chanel Dupree | TBA | |
| Leo Howard | Tate Black | TBA | |
| Ashley Puzemis | Holly Jonas | TBA | |
| Elia Cantu | Jada Hunter | TBA 2027 | |

=== Returning cast ===
Returning cast members
| Actor | Character | Date | Ref. |
|---|---|---|---|
| Christie Clark | Carrie Brady | June 2027 | |
| Bryan Dattilo | Lucas Horton | June 2027 | |
| Alice Halsey | Rachel Black | 2027 | |

== See also ==
- List of previous Days of Our Lives cast members
