= Lani Price =

- Days of Our Lives character
- Portrayed by: Sal Stowers
- Duration: 2015–present
- First appearance: September 25, 2015
- Created by: Josh Griffith and Dena Higley
- Introduced by: Ken Corday, Albert Alarr and Greg Meng (2015); Ken Corday and Albert Alarr (2021); Ken Corday and Janet Spellman-Drucker (2024)
- Spin-off appearances: Days of Our Lives: Beyond Salem (2021)
In-universe information
- Other names: Lani Grant
- Occupation: Police detective (2015–2022); Police officer (2013–2015)
- Father: TR Coates
- Mother: Paulina Price
- Adoptive father: Abe Carver
- Adoptive mother: Tamara Price
- Half-brothers: Brandon Walker (adoptive); Theo Carver (adoptive)
- Half-sisters: Chanel Dupree
- Husband: Eli Grant (2020–present)
- Sons: David Grant; Carver Grant
- Daughters: Jules Grant
- Grandfathers: Benjamin Carver (adoptive)
- Grandmothers: Olivia Price; Rita Carver (adoptive)
- Uncles: Theo Carver (adoptive); Jonah Carver (adoptive)
- Aunts: Tamara Price; Karen Carver (adoptive)
- Nephews: Trey DiMera (adoptive)
- Nieces: Olivia DiMera
- First cousins: Jett Carver (adoptive)

Lani Price is a fictional character on the NBC soap opera Days of Our Lives, played by Sal Stowers. On September 25, 2015, Lani was introduced by co-head writers Josh Griffith and Dena Higley as a rookie police officer, who is revealed to be the daughter of long-running character, Mayor Abe Carver (James Reynolds). While Lani is quickly promoted to detective, the character struggles to find a place on the canvas and is abruptly written out on June 9, 2016, after Stowers was released from her contract. Lani was reintroduced on December 19, 2016, and Stowers became a series regular again a year later.

Lani's first major romance with JJ Deveraux (Casey Moss) starts with controversy as it breaks up his relationship with Gabi Hernandez (Camila Banus). Lani and JJ become partners at the police department where she clashes with Gabi's new boyfriend, FBI agent Eli Grant (Lamon Archey). When the fiercely independent Lani is forced to lean on Eli during an investigation they grow closer as Lani doubts her future with JJ. When JJ dumps Lani after he shoots her brother Theo Carver (Cameron Johnson), Lani and Eli sleep together after she finds JJ with Gabi. While the affair results in the stillbirth of their son, and Eli and Lani ultimately fall in love, in spite of their grief. The romance is plagued by Gabi's vendetta against Lani after she accidentally kills Stefan DiMera, Gabi's husband, in the line of the duty. With their 2020 wedding, Eli and Lani are the first African-American couple to marry onscreen in the show's history.

In 2021, head writer Ron Carlivati revisited Lani's backstory with the introduction of her wealthy aunt Paulina Price played by sitcom legend Jackée Harry and Paulina's wayward daughter Chanel Dupree (Precious Way, Raven Bowens). Lani struggles to forgive Paulina when she takes advantage of Abe's trust. With the arrival of matriarch Olivia Price, played by Harry's 227 co-star Marla Gibbs, it is revealed that Paulina's is Lani's biological mother.

Lani left Salem after she was charged with killing her biological father to protect Paulina. Her last appearance was on July 1, 2022. She briefly returned on July 4, 2023 after Abe was supposedly dead and was granted furlough for his funeral.

== Storylines ==
Lani comes to Salem in 2015 and takes a special interest in Mayor Abe Carver. The ambitious Lani also befriends fellow officer Rafe Hernandez (Galen Gering) when he has her consult on two high-profile homicide cases on her first day. Lani ask Rafe on a date but he insist they keep things strictly professional. However, Rafe and Lani attend Salem's bicentennial together so they don't have to go alone. At the party, Abe confronts Lani about the pictures of him he found on her laptop and Lani reveals she is Abe's daughter with Tamara Price (Marilyn McCoo). While Abe welcomes Lani with open arms, he hesitates to tell his autistic teenage son Theo (Kyler Pettis) for fear of his reaction. However, Lani helps Theo call for help when his friend Joey Johnson (James Lastovic) collapses. Lani bonds with Theo over baseball but when Abe tells him they are brother and sister, Theo doesn't take it well. With the help of JJ Deveraux, Lani arrest serial killer Ben Weston (Robert Scott Wilson) and she is then promoted to detective.

In 2016, Theo confides in Lani that he is being cyber bullied and she encourages him to confide in Abe. Lani gives up on a potential romance with Rafe when she realizes he is in love with Hope Brady (Kristian Alfonso). Lani soon takes an interest in Hope's recently divorced son Shawn-Douglas Brady (Brandon Beemer) and they start dating. Lani tells Shawn that she is falling for him and confides in him about a bad breakup. Their plans to consummate the relationship are interrupted when they bust up a local drug ring operating out of the motel room next door. Not long after, Shawn and Lani split when he admits he still loves his ex-wife, Belle Black (Martha Madison). While she appears jealous, Lani wishes him well. Lani goes back to Miami soon after. Lani returns in December 2016 to visit Abe who is recovering from a gunshot wound. Lani runs into JJ and it is revealed that they had a drunken fling in Florida. It ultimately breaks up his romance with Gabi Hernandez.

With the two working so closely together, Lani and JJ begin dating in 2017. Fearing JJ will let the budding romance interfere in their work, Lani cuts JJ out of her attempt to infiltrate a local drug ring. Lani is dosed with a designer drug called "halo" and left for dead. Fellow cop Eli Grant supports Lani through her withdrawals and covers for her with Abe and JJ. In May 2017, Lani and several officers including JJ and Eli go to Greece to arrest Deimos Kiriakis (Vincent Irizarry). On their way back, the group are stranded on a deserted island after a plane crash. As Lani worries that JJ isn't as invested in the relationship as she is, Eli offers his support and they bond. JJ organizes a surprise birthday party for Lani in November 2017 and they profess their love for each other soon after. Their evening is interrupted when they get called to the scene of a break-in. JJ shoots the perp believing the person has a gun. Lani is devastated when she and JJ realize that Theo is the "perp" and he is unarmed. With Theo in emergency surgery, Lani is torn between JJ and Abe who vows never to forgive JJ. Lani is further upset when JJ suddenly breaks up with her as he can't forgive himself. Lani is distraught when she finds JJ in bed with Eli's girlfriend Gabi on Christmas Eve and she sleeps with Eli. Lani is horrified to learn that Gabi was comforting JJ after his attempted suicide. She and Eli then agree to keep quiet about their tryst.

In January 2018, Lani learns she is pregnant. Though she initially doesn't know who the father is, once Kayla Brady (Mary Beth Evans) tells her how far along she is, Lani knows the baby can only be Eli's. She plans to terminate the pregnancy but JJ overhears her making the appointment and assumes the baby is his. With JJ feeling hopeful about the future again, Lani starts to rethink her decision to terminate the pregnancy. Once JJ shares the news with their families, Lani abandons her abortion plans and decides to keep quiet for fear of disappointing JJ and everyone else who is excited about the baby. Eli's mother Valerie Grant (Vanessa Williams) confronts Lani about her lies and forces her to tell Eli the truth. While Eli isn't thrilled, he wants to step up. However, Lani convinces Eli to let her raise the baby with JJ as they are engaged to be married. When Gabi is framed for André DiMera's (Thaao Penghlis) murder, Lani catches her trying to destroy evidence. Gabi ask her not to report it in exchange for Lani keeping quiet about Lani and Eli's affair. However at Gabi's trial, her lawyer Justin Kiriakis (Wally Kurth) forces Lani to admit to the affair under oath. Lani is then forced to tell JJ that Eli is her baby's father and JJ dumps her. In addition to Abe's support, Eli offers to support Lani more as she prepares for the baby, but Lani is adamant that he not be involved. Despite her rejection, Eli gets Lani to the hospital when she experiences cramping caused by Placenta praevia. In June 2018, Lani experiences cramping again and JJ rushes her to the hospital where she goes into premature labor. She wants to stall her labor but Kayla and JJ inform her that it could be dangerous and Lani is rushed into emergency surgery. Lani is destroyed when she wakes up from her surgery and Eli tells her their son did not survive. Eli and Lani name their son David Abraham, after their fathers. When Lani delivers Eli a copy of their son's death certificate, Eli kisses her and Lani furiously rejects him. Lani finally admits her feelings for Eli when his friend Sheila (T-Boz) deliberately makes her jealous and they start dating.

In 2019, Lani becomes attached to baby David Ridgeway when Rafe takes him in. When Rafe gets shot on the job, she goes so far as to spend the night with Rafe to assist with David. When Lani rejects the notion that she's using David to fill the void left by their son, Eli breaks up with her. She then kisses Rafe and he helps her realize she is in denial. Lani then reconciles with Eli and they become engaged on July 4, 2019. However, when Eli's grandmother Julie Williams (Susan Seaforth Hayes) suffers a heart attack, the couple want to postpone the wedding until she recovers though Julie encourages them to move forward. Lani tries to apprehend escaped fugitive Vivian Alamain (Robin Strasser) and Vivian pulls a gun on her. Lani shoots at her but her son Stefan DiMera (Brandon Barash) jumps in the way of the bullet and Vivian escapes. Though Lani gets him to the hospital, Stefan is braindead leaving Gabi, his wife, devastated. Meanwhile, Julie is in desperate need of a heart transplant and Gabi refuses to donate his heart to save her leaving her loved ones, including Eli, devastated. At the last minute, Gabi comes to Lani and agrees to save Julie on one condition. Lani makes it clear that she never intended to hurt Stefan, and even attends Stefan's funeral with Eli to show her support and gratitude to Gabi for saving Julie. But the history between them doesn't reassure Gabi and instead, she demands that Lani to dump Eli at the altar. Gabi reveals that she rigged Julie's pacemaker to explode and orders Lani to dump Eli or watch him grieve his grandmother. Lani ultimately caves, and leaves Eli at the altar. He tries to convince her to go through with the wedding but Lani claims she doesn't love him and leaves. A year later, Lani is set to take her final vows as a nun when she confides in Kristen DiMera (Stacy Haiduk) about how Gabi forced her to leave Eli. Though Kristen urges her to fight for Eli, Lani isn't sure it's safe. Lani sees Eli again when he tracks Kristen to the convent in Europe and he reveals that he and Gabi are together.

In the New Year, Lani makes her way back to Salem and enlists JJ's help to bring down Gabi. Her plan is complicated by the news of Eli and Gabi's impending nuptials. Lani crashes the wedding and exposes Gabi. A spiteful Gabi goes through with her plan not knowing that Lani and JJ have already disabled Gabi's control over Julie's pacemaker. Though Lani explains everything to Eli, and they kiss, he isn't ready to reconcile. However, they reunite very soon after. In May 2020, Lani helps Kristen escape the police station when she is arrested for stabbing Victor Kiriakis (John Aniston). A furious Eli begrudgingly keeps quiet. Soon, they become engaged and while they look for a wedding, Lani realizes she is pregnant. Though Eli is happy, Lani is fearful of losing another baby. However, they agree to move forward with the pregnancy. On the morning of her wedding, Lani gets a visit from a fugitive Kristen. Kristen helps Lani dress for the wedding before she skips town again. The ceremony is first interrupted when Tamara collapses but she insist they go forward anyway. To make matters worse, Gabi interrupts the ceremony, for nothing more than to spite the couple. Once Gabi is gone, Vivian (Louise Sorel) crashes the wedding threatening to shoot Lani to avenge Stefan. Rafe arrives in time to arrest Vivian and reveal that Stefan may be alive. Though Lani is afraid the day is ruined, with support from Eli and their loved ones, Lani happily marries Eli. A month later, the newlyweds learn they're having twins. Later, Lani is furious when Eli goes behind her back and arrests Kristen using information she shared in confidence. Lani, along with Kristen's boyfriend Brady Black (Eric Martsolf) are shocked when Kristen turns herself and confesses despite Lani's successful appeal to district attorney Melinda Trask (Tina Huang). Later Lani is suspicious when Eli and Abe claim they are secretly planning her baby shower. She records them with her phone and realizes they are keeping a bigger secret from her that involves Brady. Lani confronts Brady who reluctantly admits that Eli forced Kristen to confess after he recorded her confession. An irate Lani confronts Eli and kicks him out of their home. On Christmas Eve, Lani reconciles with Eli thanks to Julie and her husband Doug's (Bill Hayes) meddling. Lani goes into labor during the Horton Christmas party and she gives birth to twins Jules and Carver on Christmas Day.

As they are set to take the twins home, Lani and Eli discover the babies have been kidnapped. When Bonnie Lockhart (Judi Evans) reveals she saw a woman with newborn twins in the park, Eli and Lani enlist a sketch artist and discover the woman is fugitive Dr. Amanda Raynor (Victoria Platt). Lani and Eli track Raynor down and question her. Lani deduces that Raynor gave the twins to Ivan Marais (Ivan G'Vera), Vivian's longtime henchman. While they track Ivan and Vivian (Linda Dano) to a Chicago townhouse, the desperate parents end up imprisoned by Ivan. Vivian plans to kill them once she finds out, but Eli and Lani overpower her and arrest them. As they prepare for the twins' christening, Lani's aunt Paulina arrives unexpectedly and puts herself in contention to be Jules's godmother. In actuality, the parents have already chosen Julie and Theo (Johnson) as godparents. Fortunately, Val helps Lani clarify the mixup just before the christening Paulina even gifts the parents with a blank check for the twins' college tuition. After the christening, Paulina's daughter Chanel (Precious Way) arrives and causes trouble when she tries to stick Eli's cousin Claire Brady (Isabel Durant) with an expensive champagne bill. After Paulina cuts her off financially, Lani and Eli help a worried Paulina track Chanel down only to discover she has eloped with Xander Kiriakis (Paul Telfer). At Chanel's request, Lani facilitates a meeting between Paulina and the newly weds to discuss dissolving the marriage. Lani is furious to learn of Chanel and Xander's failed extortion attempt against Paulina but reluctantly agrees to let Chanel stay with her as she divorces Xander and tries to stand on her own feet. Later, Lani convinces a fugitive Kristen to turn herself in. As Lani and Eli gear up for their first wedding anniversary, she gives her blessing for Abe and Paulina to date, as they've grown close through their work on the Horton Town Square. Lani even encourages Chanel's plans to open a bakery in Paulina's indoor market place at the square. Eli surprises Lani with an anniversary party which is interrupted by Paulina's plans to demolish the square, leaving Lani, Chanel (Bowens) and Abe furious. Though Paulina calls off her plans to demolish the square, Lani struggles to forgive Paulina and confides in Abe about Paulina's history of letting her down. Eventually, Lani forgives Paulina in exchange for complete honesty going forward just in time to share a happy reunion with her grandmother Olivia. Despite Olivia's objections, Lani gives her blessing as Abe and Paulina rekindle their romance and soon become engaged. Lani does her best to support her family when Abe gets shot. After Abe makes it through surgery, Lani is surprised when Paulina ask her to be her matron of honor. She agrees on the condition that Chanel is ok with it and Theo agrees to talk Chanel about it. At the wedding, Lani is shocked when Chanel announces that Paulina is Lani's biological mother.

== Development ==
=== Casting and creation ===
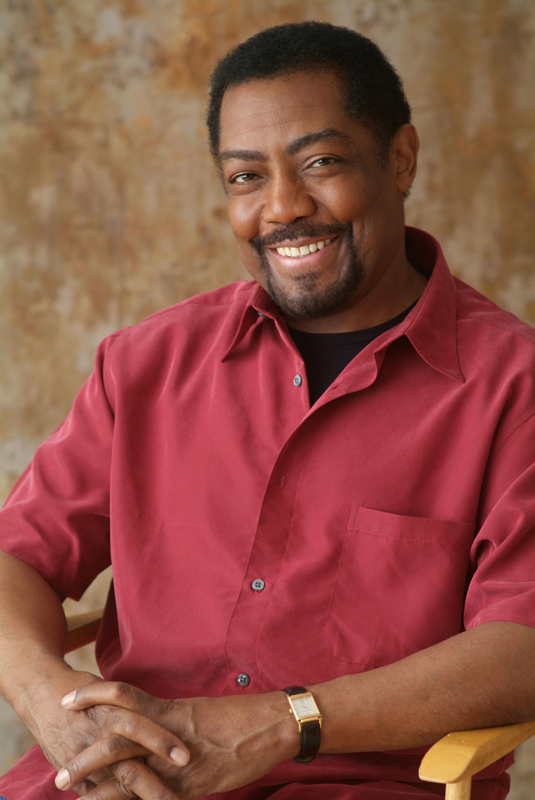
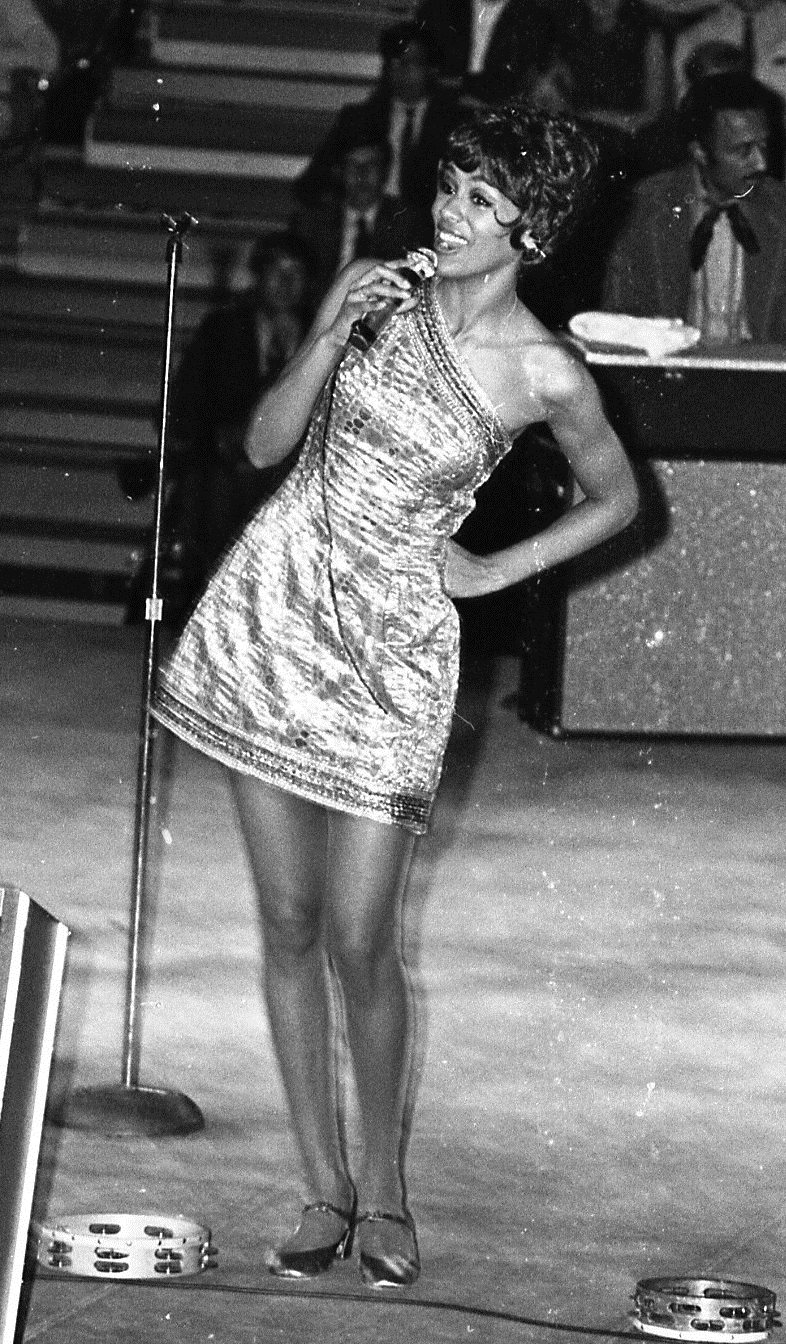
Lani was introduced as the daughter of Abe Carver and Tamara Price, played by veteran soap actor James Reynolds (left) and singer/actress Marilyn McCoo (right).

Casting for the role began in 2014. The character, was due to start filming in late 2014 and was expected to air by Spring 2015. The casting process was ongoing as of March 2015, with the character being called "Lani." On June 30, 2015, Michael Fairman TV reported that America's Next Top Model winner turned actress Sal Stowers, known to daytime audiences for her portrayal of Cassandra Foster on the short lived online reboot of All My Children had joined the cast in a contract role. The actress expressed her excitement on social media: "So beyond excited and honored to announce that I have joined the Emmy-winning cast of Days Of Our Lives!" On September 2, 2015, Stowers announced on Twitter that she would debut in the role of Lani on September 25.

Stowers auditioned opposite Galen Gering and beat out eight other actresses for the coveted role. In 2019, she recalled "When I got the audition for Lani and read the breakdown of her, I loved everything about who she was." Stowers further explained that she immediately "connected" with Lani and "felt very confident in who I was as a woman at that time and that I could [play] that." The actress described the process in an interview with Soap Opera Digest. "It was 6 a.m. and there was this huge adrenaline rush right before the test." Casting director Marnie Saitta instructed Stowers to do push-ups to help calm her nerves. Stowers booked the role the same day. She was still a bit nervous but then the actress told herself "There was a reason why I got the job." "I'm so passionate about Lani" Stowers declared when she returned in 2016. Stowers began filming in April 2015. Of her first day, Stowers said "I just remember being so overwhelmed and so nervous. It's funny to look back because I was so intimidated in a way, but also so excited." The actress filmed three episodes her first day on set. To celebrate her new gig, Stowers planned a brunch to coincide with her first airshow.

In preparation for the role, Stowers binged several "cop shows" including the CBS procedural Blue Bloods as well as Jennifer Lopez's crime drama Shades of Blue, which also aired on NBC. "I just sat in my apartment and just watched cop shows. I needed to study their body language and mannerisms, how they were speaking, how they were out in the field, how they were dressing." The actress also created a backstory for the character which delved into Lani's history with her mother.

=== Characterization ===
==== Personality ====
The original casting notice described the character as "smart and drop-dead gorgeous" African-American woman between the ages of 25 and 30 who was a "confident, dedicated professional" with a "sensitive side." The second casting call characterized Lani as "stunning, strong and savvy." A 2016 casting call after Stowers' release described the character as an "edgy" and "intelligent female" and "independent woman." Because of her profession "her tough exterior can sometimes make her hard to read. She is sexy and knows how to have fun and craves a little danger to keep things interesting." In 2015 Tony S. of Soap Central described Lani as a "plucky rookie cop." In 2017 Soaps In Depth described Lani as the "straightest arrow in the Salem PD's quiver. Akbi Khan described Lani as "confident, funny, and all-around awesome" and said she "has an admirable drive and passion when it comes to her career." Garren Waldo categorized Lani as a "heroine" that "has had more interrupted happily ever afters than most."

Stowers said "Lani is very smart." She is also "very driven and really good at her job." Stowers described Lani as having "a power in her." Lani is "very determined. When she finds out what she wants, she goes after it and won't let anything stop her." Lani is also said to be "cautious" and "methodical in her work, but with a wit and a wild streak … She has no problem grabbing a perp and throwing him up against the wall and slapping cuffs on him." The actress continued, "She's a good cop and takes her job very seriously." When Stowers was invited back to play Lani in 2016, she actively decided to change the way she portrayed Lani. "I wanted to approach her differently and bring a boldness to Lani, showing her as strong." In addition, the writers wanted to explore the character's personality more. Lani is more of a risk taker when she comes back. According Stowers, Lani has grown so much and "has more of an opinion now." The actress later explained that "[Lani] always tries to be Superwoman." Stowers further stated that "Lani owns her power and is committed to her job." "Her job makes her very happy" she stated. Lani is someone who "loves love" and she wants it just as much as she wants a career." The actress loved "how Lani stands up for herself. […] She never backs down."

==== Style ====
For the first six months, Stowers dressed in a traditional police uniform as Lani was still a rookie. "At first it was exciting because I was a cop" Stowers said. However, Stowers did want the character to change her attire and she gets that chance when Lani is promoted to detective. "Now Lani has the freedom to wear whatever she likes. I love styling her." When it comes to Lani's wardrobe, Stowers said "I wanted to make sure Lani came off as a powerful detective. I think I got a lot of her style of her style from Rachel McAdams character in True Detective. It was effortless — jeans, leather jacket, combat boots. It was the same thing with J-Lo on her show." Lani "mostly wears her detective gear and occasionally a dress."

For the character's very first wedding dress in 2019, Stowers collaborated with costume designer Richard Bloore. Bloore approached the actress several weeks prior to filming to get her input. "And I did some research and I gave him the vibe of what I wanted." Stowers explained "I wanted something that was very simple, but very sexy and romantic without having to try. I wanted something soft and elegant." Stowers said "I loved the dress. The train of it was all lace and my back was exposed." She continued that "it's just something that you never get to see Lani in because she's always in detective casual wear." For storyline purposes, Stowers decided against a wedding veil. "I was trying to make everything feel right because of what was about to happen. I thought flowers were more of that soft, lovely feel versus having a veil."

Before Lani's wedding in 2020, Stowers made a drastic change to Lani's appearance when she had her hair styled in box braids. "I chose to do the braids right when we started filming the wedding episodes" she stated to Soap Opera Digest. For Stowers, it was about representation. "I wanted young girls or women who look myself to see themselves on television." The actress revealed "I grew up wearing braids. Most black girls grow up wearing braids. It's very common in our culture." However, as popular as the hairstyle was, "braids are not really in the soap world" Stowers said. In addition, Stowers also used it as a way to further develop Lani as a character. The hairstyle helped "show who [Lani] is and where she comes from. […] I just wanted to embrace that side of myself and embrace that side of Lani and bring that to the screen for our fans." Stowers reveled in the opportunity. "It was a very special moment for me and I'm so happy that I did it because it should be done and it should be represented."

==== Backstory ====
In August 2015, TV Soap magazine reported on the rumor that Lani was Abe's daughter. When the character's last name was revealed in spoilers ahead of her debut, majority made the connection that Lani was the product of Abe's short lived romance with Tamara. Tony S. said another option for Lani's mother was Nikki Wade, a role played by Renée Jones before she stepped into the role of Abe's main love interest, Lexie Carver. Like most of his romances before Lexie, Abe's relationship with Tamara fizzles out due his unwillingness to commit. In 2017, James Reynolds said "Abe being the dedicated police officer he was, his personal life always took more than a backseat to his professional life."

Lani is born on November 10, 1987, in Miami, Florida Tamara raises Lani as a single mother. (Note: On the November 5, 2015 episode, Lani's stepfather was referenced by Abe. However, as of November 18, 2021, the character, who was never identified by name, had seemingly been retconned out of existence.) While Lani wonders who her biological father is, Tamara doesn't offer much information. Lani was an avid soccer player as a kid and even made the all-star team when she was 12 years old. Lani comes to idolize Abe in high school when she learned of his decorated career in law enforcement. In 2013, Lani joined the police force as a beat patrol officer. Growing up without Abe was the "most influential" experience in Lani's life. In a 2017 interview, Stowers said that "going into law-enforcement was her way of making up for that." Lani felt her career path could provide some sort of connection to Abe. In 2018, Soap Opera Digest reported Tamara to be dead on two separate occasions. However, in 2019 Lani tells Eli that Tamara is still alive, and living in Miami.

=== Introduction (2015–2016) ===
Lani's introduction

I was brought onto the show to play his [Abe's] daughter. That was the whole reason my character was brought to Salem.

— Sal Stowers, Soap Hub (2021)

When Lani comes to Salem in 2015, she "came with a goal," according to Stowers. The actress later explained, "She wants to be the best and prove herself, with her father being the [former] mayor." Lani is determined to ingratiate herself into the Salem Police department and "she's putting everything into her work." At the time, Lani is still settling into her new home "so we are seeing Lani on her best behavior" Stowers admitted. She is also trying to build a relationship with her father Abe whom her mother kept "hidden from Lani her whole life." In 2019, the actress reflected on the character's introduction. "When Lani first came to Salem and was a rookie, I felt like she was doing a lot of work at the station and on the phone. I was given so much cop jargon and it didn't flow right. I would try to rush it and it didn't sound right so we'd have to do it over." The first time Lani had to arrest someone, Stowers admitted she wasn't aggressive enough and producer Albert Alarr had to give her a pep talk. In the beginning, Stowers said "there was a mystery to Lani." As the mayor's daughter, "Lani kind of walked on eggshells."

With her arrival in Salem "she finally got the family she always wanted," in the Carvers. Not only does Abe accept Lani "fully" but she also bonds with Theo "after he opened up to her about being bullied." The character "has proven to be a good detective, a good daughter and a good sister." Lani initially takes an interest in Rafe as more than a friend and co-worker. Stowers was under the impression that Lani was introduced as a potential love interest for Rafe. "That's kind of where they were going and then it switched." Lani is then paired with a newly divorced Shawn-Douglas. Martha Madison who played Shawn's ex-wife Belle said "Belle is seeing somebody succeed where she failed." It's the first time a woman has seemingly taken Belle's "place" in Shawn's life. When Shawn dumps Lani to reunite with Belle, there appeared to be more to the story as Lani is portrayed as being "jealous." However, the story was dropped when Stowers left.

In March 2016, not long after the story began, Daytime Confidential reported that Stowers was one of several cast members released from their contracts when the series replaced their writers. Stowers had actually filmed her departure scenes in December 2015, only a few months after her debut. However, the series kept quiet about her impending departure. When the news finally broke, Stowers took to Twitter to thank fans for their love and support. Of Lani's unexpected departure in June 2016, Stowers said "I just went with what was happening." She further stated "it wasn't my choice to leave at that time." Ryan White-Nobles noted that Lani "hasn’t done much of anything since her debut last fall." The actress said of her first stint: "It was just mostly detective work, so there wasn't any substance to Lani yet. And then I left." Lani last appeared on June 9, 2016, "peeved" as she "witnesses a warm moment between Shawn and Belle."

=== Reintroduction (2016) ===
In July 2016, Stowers appeared in a cast photo for 13,000th episode. Executive producer Ken Corday revealed to Soap Opera Digest that Lani was set to return during November Sweeps. However, Stowers does not reappear until December 19, 2016. Stowers was hesitant when she was suddenly contacted about returning to the role of Lani. "I was excited but at first, I didn't believe it" she explained. Stowers expected Lani to come back at some point because of her family. The return was kept secret so it was just as much a surprise to her co-stars as the actress herself. But Stowers was excited because she missed working with everyone.

Stowers made a conscious choice to "put her stamp" on Lani. "It was definitely a big switch from when I first got on the show until I came back" she told Soap Opera Digest. The break helped her develop as an actress and as a person. "When I walk onto the set now I'm very confident in what I've created with Lani." She continued, "I've definitely grown, not only as an artist, but also as a human… Giving Lani a voice, I also gave myself a voice. That's not easy to do, especially [with] a new job. Stowers was grateful that Lani was much more integrated into the canvas upon her return. "Everyone respects her. She's making great friendships. I think in the beginning […], that wasn't there." This time around, Lani's relationships with Abe and Theo are also showcased more. Stowers said "And I think it’s important for Lani to have a life established. To show her family, to show she’s not just a detective, she’s not just [a] girlfriend that there’s more to her and I like that they wrote that in." "I love playing Abe's daughter and being a part of his family" Stowers said. She also "loved" working opposite the veteran Reynolds. She said "we just naturally have a father/daughter connection with each other which makes it very easy for us to work together."

The purpose of Lani's return is actually to visit Abe who is recovering from a gunshot wound. However, she comes back to town with "secret." The secret turns out to be that Lani has a connection to JJ Deveraux. Serial Scoop's Michael Goldberg said that the characters would "cross paths" in a "major story." When JJ is in Florida in 2016, he meets up with Lani and they have a drunken fling, which JJ doesn't remember. However, he remembers enough to tell his then girlfriend Gabi Hernandez that he cheated on her which ultimately leads to their split.

=== Relationship with JJ Deveraux (2017–2018) ===
After Lani's return, the writers develop a romance between her and JJ. In 2017 Corday said that "Sparks will fly between these two" now that they're working together. Stowers liked the pairing "because they're fun" she stated to Soaps In Depth. "They have this very playful chemistry but they also really get each other." Stowers later said "Lani's very happy when she's around JJ." She also described JJ as Lani's "guilty pleasure." JJ and Lani are "so fun together, and they just love being spontaneous with each other." Stowers said it was easy work with Casey Moss and credited her costar with making her feel comfortable.

The first major obstacle is Lani feels the rookie JJ will let their relationship interfere with their work so she tries to cut him out of things. However, this backfires on Lani at times. In 2017, Lani goes undercover as a prostitute "dressed in fishnet stockings and a bustier bra" to investigate a drug ring. After she is drugged and left for dead, Lani experiences withdrawal and at the same time questions the future of her relationship with JJ. "She wonders if this is what he really wants or if it's just something to get him by." Lani is adamant about keeping JJ out of her struggles because "she had something to prove to herself" and JJ. "She wanted to show JJ that she could hold it together." However, Eli supports Lani through the ordeal and keeps her secret. Her uncertainty about the relationship only increases when she witnesses a close moment between JJ and Gabi, and Lani kisses Eli. Stowers relished in the opportunity to show her acting chops as Lani suffered from withdrawals after ingesting halo. "I spent a lot of time researching what addicts go through during withdrawal — I didn't know there was fear, loneliness, and hot and cold sensations, feeling like your skin is on fire." Stowers admitted that she had to go a "dark place" but she was up for the challenge. "I remember lying on my floor in the dark, just shaking, crying, feeling alone. I really put myself into the shoes of someone who had been drugged. I wanted to show the audience the truth of that experience." Stowers portrayed a similar plot as All My Children's Cassandra in 2013. It "was scary" for Stowers who described herself as a "very positive, happy person."

In November 2017, an umbrella storyline unfolded with JJ, and the police department, at the center. The story affects everyone, including Lani as JJ's partner, both professionally and in life. When JJ shoots an unarmed Theo, "Lani is devastated" Stowers declared. "The man she is in love with has shot her brother, who she loves so much. She sees both of them suffering and it's heartbreaking." Stowers described Lani's internal struggle to TV Source Magazine. "It’s a push-pull, Theo is her little brother, that’s her life and of course there’s JJ, who she loves so much." The story proved to be very emotional for Stowers, both due to real-life implications as well as her relationship Kyler Pettis. "I have such a close bond with Kyler. Whenever I work with him, he brings out so much emotion in me." She continued "It really broke me down." The actress had to let herself "be vulnerable with these three important men in Lani's life." Because Lani has a "distinct" relationship with each of them, her heart is "pulled in so many different directions." Stowers credited the plot with helping her prove to the producers that she could "carry even deeper story." After the story, Stowers became a series regular again.

When JJ breaks up with her, it is "for Lani's sake, of course" Alina Adams noted. Lani turns to Eli for comfort as they believe JJ and Gabi are together, and the next morning, she regrets it "instantly" Stowers insisted. Lani is "distraught" and in the moment, Eli "basically was her savior" Stowers said. "She wanted to feel loved and she wanted someone to comfort her and Eli was there." When Lani learns of JJ's attempted suicide, "she knows she made a mistake and has to live with that." Lani reunites with JJ after Theo wakes up from a coma and she hopes they can put everything behind them and "just live their lives." When JJ finds out Lani is pregnant, he proposes marriage assuming the baby is his. While she never "intended to deceive JJ," Lani "managed to get caught up in his excitement." Carlivati said the proposal "raises the stakes" and only makes it "harder for Lani to tell the truth." Stowers described the proposal as "very sweet." Lani "has this fairytale in her head that if they get married and have a baby, maybe it can all work out." However, things get awkward as Eli and Gabi are present for the moment as well. "Lani’s so conflicted because while JJ’s proposing to her, she sees Eli and Gabi standing there. Lani knows she’s making the wrong decision saying yes, but it’s what she wants." They ultimately split for good when Lani's lie is exposed. Her attempt to salvage her romance with JJ "all blows up in her face in the worst way possible." Though she lied, Lani's intentions were to protect JJ and "save what they have together." Stowers later said "[Lani] still wants to be with JJ and she still loves him, but she has to let it go. She can't really do too much there because she knows that she messed up really bad." The couple does get some closure JJ comforts Lani after her baby dies. "The love is still there for both of them, even through this hard time." Stowers stated that "in her time of need, [JJ] is there and I think for Lani, that just means the world to her."

=== Pregnancy and stillbirth (2018) ===
Lani's attempt to move after her one-night-stand with Eli on is futile because she is pregnant. In 2019, Stowers admitted she was "completely shocked" when she learned that Lani was pregnant. According to the actress, Lani is "in denial" over the news. "She is super shocked and scared and also not sure how to feel because she doesn't know who the father is." But, because of the timing, "she knows it can only be Eli's baby." Carlivati described it as a "huge dilemma for Lani" in 2018. While she "initially" tries to do the "right thing" and tell Eli the truth, Lani knows she'll lose JJ. At the time, Lani "also doesn't want to have a kid in general." When Eli reaffirms their decision to forget about the one-night-stand, Lani decides to terminate the pregnancy. But when JJ learns Lani is pregnant, she realizes the news brings a "little bit of light" to JJ's life and he is thinking of his future again, and with her. JJ's reaction to the news is justification for Lani. "She truly believes that she is holding JJ together and that if he finds out the truth, he’s going to spiral down. She’s afraid he might try to kill himself, like he [was going to do before]." Making decisions with JJ in mind, Lani starts to reconsider termination. And once news spreads to their families, "She knows she can't terminate it now. […] Now she's in a deeper hole because she's lying to her family." However, Eli's mother Valerie uncovers the baby's true paternity and confronts Lani. Valerie is "basically threatening her" Stowers explained in Soap Opera Digest. With Valerie forcing her hand, Lani comes clean with Eli about the pregnancy. But she convinces him to let her raise the baby with JJ. At the same time, Lani is willing to do anything to keep Gabi quiet. Meanwhile, Lani is also nervous that Valerie can "ruin everything." When Lani is forced to admit to her tryst with Eli at Gabi's murder trial, Stowers expressed excitement about the scenes. "The truth really does get to come out, but it's devastating."

Next, Lani sets out to pick up the pieces of her life. "At this point, Lani has no one to talk to and for the first time, Lani talks to the baby." Lani apologizes to her baby because she's "messed everything up." Stowers described it as "such a sweet moment because she's settling into the truth of it all." Lani then confides in Abe. "She just needs comfort and she's not afraid to tell her dad." Abe offers his support and lets Lani vent. This moment "is really big for her because everyone else is already disappointed in her." Though "heartbroken" and "embarrassed," Lani knows she "has to get herself together for the sake of the baby." And while he offers his support, Lani doesn't want Eli involved. "She doesn't want to seem like they're just a happy family who planned to have a baby because that's not what it is." Fortunately, Eli is there when Lani experiences painful cramping and rushes her to the hospital where she is diagnosed with Placenta praevia. Though Lani is assured that she can still deliver a healthy baby, as long she takes it easy, Lani is "crushed by what the diagnosis could mean for her baby."

The Storyteller

I cried so much and it was real heartbreak. It was real, the devastation and confusion of it all. And then I found out that they were bringing in a little doll that looked so real and it was so sad because you can tell that it’s supposed to be a deceased infant, and that was even more heartbreaking.

— Sal Stowers, Soap Opera Digest (2018)

When Lani goes into labor, Carlivati said "it is very premature and it's a very dangerous situation." On the advice of JJ, she undergoes emergency surgery in an effort to save her life and the baby's. However, while Lani is in surgery on June 18, doctors deliver the news to Eli that their son, called David Abraham, did not survive. While Lani is in surgery and unconscious during recovery, as everyone else receives the news, Lani fantasized about giving birth to a healthy baby. Stowers confided in TV Insider's Michael Maloney that she was "completely shocked" as she was under the impression that Lani would go full-term. In the middle of production for the birth scenes, Alarr told Stowers that Lani would lose the baby. "I actually found out the Friday before the Monday we were going to start filming the end of it." At the time, Lani was about six months along and Stowers was "already to the point of where I was accepting that Lani was going to be a mom." Meanwhile, Lani was "really happy after everything she'd been through and then this happens." To prepare for the scenes, Stowers who was not a parent said "I did research about women losing their babies to placenta [praevia] and watched a ton of videos because I didn't really know where to go or how to grieve that." Shortly after the filming of the baby's death, Stowers lost her grandmother and then had to go back to film Lani's reaction scenes. "So even though I didn't know how to grieve before I was filming the losing the baby episodes, a week later, I definitely knew because I lost a really important woman in my life. I had a deeper level of grief because I had just experienced that, so I brought that to the story."

Stowers explained that the guilt "stems from knowing that baby was made out of a mistake and not love." Lani "spent so much time focusing on the negative" when she got pregnant that "she goes into blaming herself" for the stillbirth. "If she wasn't stressing so much, maybe the baby would've had a chance. If she would've given it more love, maybe he would still be here." The actress signed a new contract with the series in the summer of 2018. Though Lani was not featured heavily in story after the baby's death, her determination to see Lani through her grief weighed heavily on Stowers decision to sign a new contract with the series. "I knew there was unfinished business with Lani." Stowers credited story with helping her grow "as an artist." She continued, "I felt it really showed what I can do as an actress."

=== Relationship with Eli Grant ===
Lani's most significant relationship is with Eli Grant. The connection between the two is obvious, but Stowers felt it would be a bit "awkward" due to Abe's romance with Valerie. While they clash professionally, Lani admires how good Eli is at his job. Stowers was excited to work with Archey again, as they had worked together in their modeling days. "We're super-comfortable around each other because we've known each other for so long." Coryon Gray said Eli and Lani's early interactions "show their personalities" and further "build up" Lani as a character.

After the affair's exposure leaves both of them single, and despite Lani carrying his child, she still wants nothing to do with Eli. "At the moment, she feels like Eli is the person who messed up her life." Lani and Eli do eventually bond over their mutual grief for David Abraham. However, when their dynamic "starts to turn romantic, Lani is the one to pull back from it" because she believes their feelings are only due to their shared loss. According to Gray, Lani and Eli "rushed into something, it didn't work out and now they're trying to work through it." It's a "slow-burn" romance Archey said. It takes interference from Sheila for Lani to finally be honest about her feelings. Sheila implies to Lani that she is sleeping with Eli which "triggers feelings in [Lani] and makes her jealous" Stowers explained. However, Eli plays into Sheila's act, "to see Lani's reaction." Stowers admitted that "everything is getting under Lani's skin." Eli confronts her and Lani finally admits her feelings. Like Archey, Stowers was excited to work opposite Tionne "T-Boz" Watkins of the girl group TLC, who plays Sheila. "She's pretty awesome to work with. And she's fun. […] I love working with her." In comparison to Lani's previous relationship, Eli and Lani "get each other on a different level" because of their common experiences. The relationship allowed Stowers to further develop Lani because "so much more of who [Lani] is is coming out." Stowers credited Archey's humor for bringing out the "fun" and "lighthearted" side of the relationship.

In spring of 2019, Lani develops an "instant attachment" to baby David Ridgeway. Lani goes so far as to spend the night with Rafe to help him care for David. While everyone around Lani, including Eli, is "concerned," for her, it is "strictly" about caring for David. Stowers later said Lani "was definitely putting Eli on the back burner." Her actions "drive a wedge between Eli and Lani, so she starts to pull closer toward Rafe and the baby and further away from Eli." According to Stowers, "it definitely puts her and Eli in a weird spot" as Eli feels Lani is "projecting the loss of their David onto this baby David." While Lani knows it's true, she isn't ready to face it. When she kisses Rafe after Eli breaks up with her, Lani thinks she can have a life with David and Rafe. "They've already been playing house and acting like a family." And Lani "really starts to believe that David is her son. She is basically being a mother to him." But Rafe knows "Lani is in denial" and urges her to reconcile with Eli knowing how much she loves him. "Rafe is the one who completely opens Lani's eyes about entire the situation." Lani must then say goodbye to David. "It's devastating for her. She has fallen in love with that child. But she knows it's the right thing to do," both for herself and her relationship with Eli. "They reconcile, grow from this, and become stronger" Stowers said.

Stowers on Lani and Gabi

In Gabi's eyes, Lani has destroyed Gabi's life. In the beginning, Eli and Gabi were dating, so she feels that Lani took Eli away from her, she feels that Lani took JJ away from her, and now it's Stefan. I feel she has a lot of anger and hatred toward Lani. And now with shooting Stefan, everything just caught on fire.

— Sal Stowers, Soap Opera Digest (2019)

Lani and Eli are set to marry when Julie suffers a heart attack. Julie encourages them to get married. However, when Lani is on duty an even "bigger incident" sends Lani "into crisis and threatens to possibly upend this wedding." That event proves to be when Lani inadvertently shoots Stefan leaving him brain dead. In the aftermath of Stefan's death, Lani is "questioning who she is a cop, and if she made the right decision. She was trying to protect herself" but "ended up shooting an innocent man, and that keeps playing in her head, as well. […] She is a cop, she was doing her job, she did absolutely nothing wrong, but when you do shoot someone, you can't help but feel sympathy." On top of the existing "tension" between them, Lani is riddled with guilt. "Lani is very genuine and she's very sincere and she wants to show Gabi just how sorry she is." She even attends Stefan's funeral "trying to find some peace with Gabi." Lani is shocked when Gabi "wants her to dump Eli at the altar." Though Lani initially thinks she's is joking, "she realizes Gabi is dead serious. […] She's taking Lani down, basically." Having rigged Julie's pacemaker, Gabi issues Lani an "ultimatum," either she leaves Eli or Julie dies. Carlivati said "We're building to this romantic wedding and Lani has this hanging over her head." On the morning of the wedding, Lani is "very conflicted" Stowers stated. "Eli is the love of Lani's life; she wants to protect him. She doesn't want to put him through this. She knows that this is going to destroy him." The storyline also saw McCoo reprise her role as Lani's mother, Tamara, for the first time since 1987. Stowers relished in working opposite McCoo. "I was so excited. And it gives Lani more depth." Lani's interaction with Tamara "show the audience a little bit more of who she is." Stowers told Soap Opera Digest about the difficulty in playing Lani and Eli's break-up and having to adjust to work without Archey as her screen partner. But she was still "really proud" of the work they did together.

In her absence, Lani joins a convent. For Lani, "Eli is the only man for her, so therefore if she can't be with Eli, she feels that turning herself over to the Lord is the only place where she can be forgiven." As Lani is ready to take her final vows, Kristen DiMera "is there to help." The two women have many things to bond over. "They're both brokenhearted and they're both grieving their deceased children." Kristen urges Lani to take her life back but "Lani is still afraid that Gabi can kill Julie." An unexpected reunion with Eli prompts Lani's return to Salem to "neutralize" Gabi. She secretly pulls JJ into her plan knowing "if Gabi got wind of her confiding in anybody, that could be the end of Julie." However, Lani is racing against time as she learns Eli is about to marry Gabi. While Lani successfully exposes Gabi upending the wedding, any progress she makes with Eli is stalled as he needs "time to process" the news. Lani assures Eli that "she loves him and whenever he's ready, she'll be there." Stephanie Sloane, editor of Soap Opera Digest, described the confrontation as the "ultimate 'turnabout is fair play' moment' considering how Gabi had previously destroyed" Lani and Eli's first wedding.

Despite their happy reunion, Lani causes tension when she helps Kristen escape police custody. She intends "to keep Eli out of that to protect him from that" but he finds out and is forced to look the other way. As Lani is set to marry Eli, she realizes she is pregnant again. Though it is happy news, Lani is "less thrilled." She is filled with "trepidation" because she can't bare the thought of losing another child. But it's "something they tackle together and come to a decision about whether or not to continue this pregnancy." Despite several mishaps and uninvited guests, the pair become the first African-American couple to marry on-screen in the show's history. However, the newly weds are at odds due to Eli turning Kristen in. After Kristen confesses, Lani grows suspicious of her husband and father's sudden closeness. "They're close but they're not that close, so when she sees them being overly close with each other, she kind of knows there's something there." When she plants her phone to record their conversation which leads her to Brady. "Lani is just in complete shock" when Brady informs her of Eli's actions. Not only did Eli to her, but according to Stowers, Lani can't get over that "he did all of this to her best friend, the woman who is the reason why Eli and Lani are even together. She is the reason Lani mustered up the strength to leave the convent, to come back to Salem to fight for Eli, […], and Eli basically just threw that away." Lani confronts Eli, but he doesn't back down. "They both believe they're doing what's right for each other and for the situation, and they cannot see eye to eye."

While the couple reconcile in time for the twins' birth, the happiness is short lived when the twins disappear leaving Lani "in complete and utter shock." Bonnie provides a lead but "That's all they have." There is slight relief when they locate Dr. Raynor "but Lani also wants to strangle" the woman for her actions. The news that Raynor has handed the twins over to a blackmailer leaves the parents "devastated" but Raynor's description of the man leads them to Ivan and Vivian. Now, "it all kind of makes sense" for Lani. "Of course [Vivian] is still out there trying to ruin Lani's life" as Lani took Stefan's life. But, "at this point, I'm going to do whatever I have to do to get my kids back" Stowers said of Lani's mindset.

=== Price family and secret lineage ===
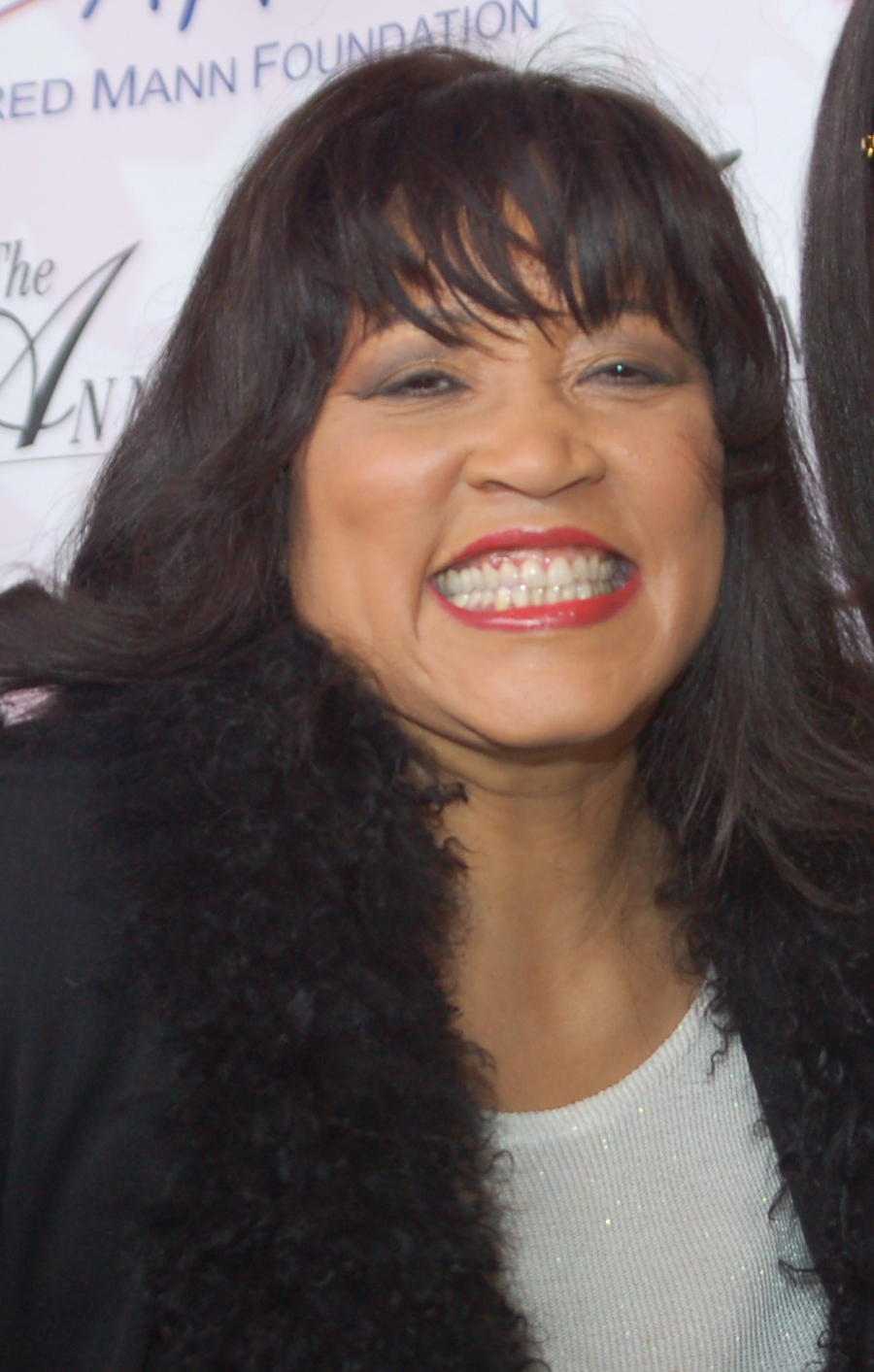
In 2021, Jackée Harry was introduced as Lani's aunt, who is later revealed to be her biological mother.

In 2021, Harry joined the cast as Lani's wealthy aunt, Paulina when she surprises Lani before the twins christening. Paulina is soon followed by her daughter and Lani's cousin Chanel. On the characters' introductions, Carlivati explained that idea came about as the writers brainstormed ideas for Lani and Eli. "It seemed like a good opportunity to expand the family a bit" and Chanel could also "play into Eli and Lani's story." Despite her initial trepidation about Chanel's interactions with Eli and Lani, Stowers was excited about Paulina and Chanel. The pair are "caught in the middle" when "Chanel acts out in some very outrageous and fun ways." As they help Chanel navigate the mess she's made of her life, "it kind of turns Lani and Eli's lives upside down." Stowers gushed about working with Harry. "I’m so thankful and honored to get to play alongside her. It was definitely one of those moments in my career where I was like, 'Oh wow! Look who I get to work alongside.'" Of their dynamic, Stowers said "It was effortless. It was like, she was my aunt. I was her niece. That family dynamic was just there. When we’re around each other, it feels good." The Price family's expansion continued with Gibbs' casting as Olivia in July 2021. Like Harry, Stowers was as excited to work with the "pioneer" Gibbs. "I remember the first day she came on set. She saw me and automatically called me by my character’s name […] I remember hugging her and feeling like I wanted to cry. She reminds you of a grandmother and feels like a grandmother. It felt so special to be hugging her and be able to work with her."

In the summer of 2021, Lani's wedding anniversary collides with Paulina's plans for the town square. Their party is upended by Paulina's plans to demolish Horton Town Square. "It is hard for both Abe and Lani to accept this betrayal, because that's what it is" Reynolds said. Paulina's deception would prove much deeper for Lani. Upon Olivia's arrival, it is revealed that Lani is Paulina's daughter. Carlivati admitted that story really developed once Harry joined the cast as Paulina. While he loved Harry as a comedienne, Carlivati wanted to give Harry something more dramatic to play. The writers use Olivia to facilitate the plot's exposition. As the family matriarch, Olivia is the "keeper of the family secrets." While Olivia convinces Paulina to keep quiet about Lani, Carlivati said the truth is "going to turn all these relationships upside down when they were just getting back on track." While Stowers was not immediately made aware of the twist, she anticipated something big. "They didn’t tell me for a while, but something just wasn’t clicking. When I found out she was going to be my mother my heart sank" at the realization that Lani would no longer be Abe's daughter. Stowers said "So, for me, it didn’t make any sense at first." She continued, "I didn’t want anything to be taken away from him [Reynolds]…I was absolutely heartbroken." However, Stowers did eventually come around to the idea.

The story climaxed as the writers revisited the iconic devil possession plot with Marlena Evans (Deidre Hall). Marlena, as Abe's longtime friend and Tamara's college roommate, becomes a confidant for Paulina and is enlisted to officiate her wedding to Abe. A possessed Marlena plays on Chanel's insecurities about Paulina's favoritism of Lani and tells Chanel the truth just before the wedding. Chanel is compelled to do "the right thing" and exposes her mother's "huge deception" at the wedding. Stowers described Lani as "absolutely crushed." She continued that Lani feels like "her whole life is basically a lie. So she’s not only crushed, but she’s f*#*ing pissed." With the exception of the family she has with Eli and the twins, "Nothing is real to [Lani]. Nothing makes sense." As she questions everything, Lani's first instinct is to distance herself from Paulina. "She doesn’t want to see her. She doesn’t want to talk to her. She completely just cuts her off."

== Reception ==
=== Casting and introduction ===
The casting news was well received by critics. Michael Fairman TV said of the casting "More big news out of Salem!" Kambra Clifford said "The door at NBC's Days of our Lives is revolving faster than it ever has these days with a slew of actors headed to the canvas and a few rumored to soon be out." Soap Opera Spy's Annemarie LeBlanc was also "excited" to see what role Stowers would fill. Jenn Bishop of TV Source Magazine said "Days has been enticing viewers with some exciting new additions" one of which is Stowers. Bishop admitted "With all the casting comings and goings, it can be a little hard to keep track." Trey from Rickey.org said "Looks like Days of our Lives is about to get some well-needed diversity on their canvas!" Ruby of Ruby's Hub also expressed her excitement for Stowers' debut and said "Fans are very curious to know which family does she belong to."

Maloney on Lani's lineage

Soaps are famous for creating long-lost children and sometimes they come out of nowhere. But DAYS went into the history books in order to tie Lani to one of Abe’s former loves, Tamara Price, played by singer/actress Marilyn McCoo.

— Michael Maloney, TV Insider (2018)

While many were excited about the casting news, the writing for Lani's introduction garnered mixed reactions. Taylor Rios of the Inquisitr said it was "interesting" that Lani was Abe's daughter. "Abe FINALLY has a storyline" Donald Thompson of Canyon News said of the Lani's arrival. Tony S. was also excited that Abe had a storyline and said "I'm on board with Lani. Sal Stowers has quickly won me over with her exuberant take on the role." Janet Di Lauro appreciated that Lani's introduction was "well-rooted in Salem history." She continued that "All the stars aligned when years later Lani revealed she was Tamara’s child, and viewers were totally invested in the turn. The pair even looked the part of mother and daughter; both stylish and sleek." Thomasina, a Soap Opera Digest reader listed the revelation that Lani is Abe's daughter as one of the highlights for the bicentennial episodes. However, Michael Logan who described Lani as "eye-poppingly gorgeous but mind-numbingly dull" said the character's introduction "has yet to give [James] Reynolds anything worth while to do." Gray admitted that it was odd when Lani "was welcomed into the fold as a legitimate family member" without much effort by writers to legitimatize her backstory. Michael Thomas believed that Lani did not interact with her family enough during her initial introduction. Ruby's Hub said Lani "has already won the fans hearts" in early 2016. While Tony enjoyed the character for her "sass," only a few months later, he said "I miss her 'Girl power' days," feeling as if the writing for Lani had gone awry. The character given the "Most Regressed Award" on Soap Central's year-end list in 2016.

News of Stowers' 2016 fired also elicited diverse opinions. Michael Fairman TV said Stowers "was let-go from the series rather suddenly." "Firing the actress proves once again that while discussions of diversity are of growing importance in primetime and film, daytime is completely regressing in this area" Jamey Giddens said. White-Nobles said the lack of development for the character left him unable to feel anything for Lani. However, he continued, "I will say it’s disappointing that once again; an actress of color remains an afterthought in a genre that once placed a value on showcasing diversity." Thomas was "sad to see the talented actress go" but wished her well. He later stated that "Her story was short-lived and fans never really got the chance to connect with her." Sandra Dee believed the character had potential, but felt "there really is no point in keeping Lani around, sadly" if the story with Shawn was dropped. However, Ruby's Hub felt "Lani has no reason to leave" because of her familial connections. Tony said "Lani leaving was a good thing at the time." Goldberg felt "the actress was let go from the show before the story could go anywhere." Of the character's exit, Rios said "she simply disappeared without any explanation."

The announcement that Stowers was set to return was received well. Tanya Clark categorized the announcement as "good news." "Sal Stowers couldn't get enough of Days of Our Lives" Luke Kerr said of the return news. Critics were hopeful the character's return would lead to better writing. Goldberg said "here is hoping that Lani works better as a character this time around then she did last time." Thomas said "We could understand why the new co-head writing team would want to give the character of Lani [Price] another shot." Ruby's Hub said "It was about time the writers wrote Lani back into the storyline." Jenna Kaylor said "I adore Lani when she gets into detective mode and Sal Sowers plays it perfectly."

=== Motherhood ===
The pregnancy twist was mostly well received. Soap Opera Digest described the pregnancy as "compelling story" but were critical of how the plot "stalled as soon as JJ found out the baby wasn't his." Diane Brounstein said "It looks like things in this nicely tied-up quadrangle are about to get a whole lot messier." Thompson who described it as a "bombshell" said "I always love how right after someone has a one-night stand in the soap arena they learn like 1-2 weeks later they are pregnant. It’s like the notion of being surprised is not even possible for the viewers." Jack Ori from TV Fanatic felt Lani's shock over the pregnancy made her look "irresponsible" and "stupid" because she never considered the possibility, though she and Eli didn't use protection. Ori accused the writers of going for "cheap drama" by having Lani lie about her baby's paternity. Gray said the story exposed just how "thin of a character" Lani was. While Gray recognized Stowers as a capable actress, "she’s had scraps to work with. And it shows. Lani has made bad decisions time and time again but the viewers are left wondering why each time!" Gray later admitted that Lani's poor decisions made her hard to root for. However, he appreciated that Lani did not have malicious intent when she lied. Carolyn Hinsey described the pregnancy plot as a "snoozefest." Contrarily, Hope Campbell said it was one of the "Hottest Plots Right Now" in 2018. Some viewers felt Lani was blaming others for the mistakes she made. C.S. in Canada said "Lani should stop acting like a baby, woman up and take the blame!" According to a poll of over 12,000 fans, 65% did not have any sympathy for Lani.

Baby Mine

The scenes were beautiful, realistically performed and staged as DAYS showed the ripple-effect impact of the tragedy on many Salem players. It made for difficult but emotionally rewarding viewing.

— Soap Opera Digest (2018)

The decision for the baby to be stillborn garnered mixed reactions. Soap Opera Digest described the scenes surrounding David's death as a "tearjerker." However, the magazine felt David's death left Lani, and those involved in "story limbo. […] In wrapping up the plot before it ever really got going, DAYS threw away potential for major and meaningful drama." Brounstein described it as a "Shocking Salem TRAGEDY." Maloney described it "shocking twist." Maloney further stated that it "will go down as one of the saddest moments in DAYS’ history." Soap Opera News blog said the material was "emotional and gut-wrenching." TV Fanatic's roundtable unanimously admitted that while the loss of the baby was sad, they did not care for the character. Ori admitted "mixed feelings" about the "heartbreaking" scenes, it felt like an attempt to garner sympathy Lani's potential reunion with JJ. However, he insisted it wasn't enough to make Lani or reunion with JJ "rootable." In addition, Ori said the lack of interaction between Eli and Lani "detracted from the power" of the scenes. Campbell said the story was "told so very wrong" that it left the viewer to question the point of it all. Campbell argued that Lani's diagnosis wasn't severe enough to warrant the child's death. The writer also felt the dream sequences that juxtaposed with the David's death were a bit cruel. "Can you rub a little bit more salt in that wound there, DAYS?" It also didn't help that the story was spoiled ahead of time. "So, watching the Hortons gather around Eli and plan for the baby just stung more." While he did see it as a way to end a plot that was a "little lackluster," Tony agreed with Campbell's sentiment that the stillbirth was unnecessary.

Stowers garnered "rave reviews" for her portrayal of Lani's grief, including from her Archey who took to social media to offer his applause. Soap Opera Digest said "Kudos to Sal Stowers (Lani) for her fantastic work." Josh Baldwin awarded Stowers with the "Performer of the Week" on the Daytime Confidential podcast. Maloney called the performance "riveting" and agreed that Stowers should definitely be in contention for a Daytime Emmy Award for Supporting Actress in 2019. Tony said "Hands down, the saddest part of this storyline was brought on by the actors' powerful performances. Sal Stowers especially tore my heart up with her gut-wrenching take on the sheer heartbreak of what Lani was going through." Ori "enjoyed Lani's realization that her life with Rafe and another baby called David impossible. "Not a Lani fan, but that was some great work by Sal Stowers." He gave the actress "major props" for her portrayal "Lani's pain and guilt were raw and real as it hit her that she'd been throwing her life away for the fantasy." Soap Opera Digest hailed Stowers's portrayal of Lani's grief as one of the most "memorable performances" of 2018. David's death was given an honorable mention on Brounstein's list of most tragic deaths of the year. Brounstein later categorized David's death as a "punch to the gut" and said Stowers "broke our hearts" but made viewers root for Lani.

Like critics, viewers were "really affected" by the plot. Stowers observed that fans on social media were "really sad, and they're mad." Paige Turner of The Daily Banner said "the fanbase is not pleased" as David died before his life even began. It also didn't help that the deceased infant was depicted onscreen. One viewer was just relieved that Lani wasn't killed off. "Although the loss of Eli and Lani's baby boy was tragic, it does give DAYS a way to reunite two couples who should be together, Lani and JJ, and Eli and Gabi." Another viewer said the "performances […] surrounding baby David's death were spot-on and heart-wrenching."

Reactions to Lani's second pregnancy were much more positive. Ori said the "story has promise if it's written properly." However, he did not like the plot's reliance on the "overused trope of Lani not realizing she missed her period." On the other hand, Christine Orlando felt it "to be one of the most realistic scenes the show has had in a while." Both Ori and Orlando were excited about the story while Doolfan4life saw it as "filler drama." Ori later said "the Lani storyline is surprisingly compelling." He credited the story with changing his opinion about the character. "Lani used to be my least favorite character, but now she's on the top of my list. It's amazing what better writing can do!" Ori declared that "Lani's fear of miscarrying again makes sense." He appreciated Lani's loved ones rallying around her. "THIS is what I watch Days of Our Lives for -- families supporting each other no matter what forces are aligned against their members." Laurisa sympathized with Lani's reservations. "I wished I could have hugged Lani through the screen when she started spiraling out of control about another miscarriage. I've been there, and it's awful. I hope DAYS lets Lani have a healthy baby this time." While Lani carrying twins was "unexpected," Orlando said "I love this twist because it's a happy one, and [Eli and Lani] deserve some more joy in their lives." Laurisa was happily relieved by the news. "I'm so glad the babies Elani are safe! Let's keep it that way!" Kaylor could not contain her joy. "My babies are having twins!!!" She continued "To say I was excited when I found out about the twins, is putting it mildly." Kaylor said "The reaction to the news was the best part of it all for me." Like other critics, Kaylor implored the writers to let Lani have a successful pregnancy. "I really need them to have a good and healthy pregnancy, Days. I’m serious. No premature, one baby is in a health crisis delivery. They should be happy and healthy. Please do not harm another Elani baby."

Stowers won Soap Hub's "Performer of the Week" for her portrayal of Lani after the twins' abduction. "Sal Stowers’ devastation knocked us out" Brounstein declared. "[W]atching Stowers shine as Lani’s world crashed down around her was heartbreaking. We couldn’t look away — nor did we want to." Tony echoed similar thoughts. "Sal Stower's performance was heartbreaking. I misted up while watching her. Stay strong, Lani!" He later said Stowers is really "selling the sadness of this situation." Tony said it was "smart" to have Lani recognize Raynor from their interactions when she was pregnant with David.

=== Lineage ===
Into the Salem-Verse

Sal Stowers gut-punched me with her performance as Lani stood at the altar and calculated that if Paulina was her mother, Abe wasn't her father. Oof. That moment is going to haunt me for a while. It absolutely depicted Lani's shattering loss. Bravo, Sal!

— Tony S., Soap Central (2021)

The story of Lani's true parentage garnered mix reactions from critics. Thompson, who suspected Paulina was Lani's mother before the show confirmed it, said "That is a very interesting plotline that I cannot wait to see where things are headed." Michael Fairman TV described the revelation as a "bombshell." Di Lauro called it a "doozy of a secret" and said "While it's a major move in the drama department, the twist upends a lot of established history and well-developed relationships." She felt it was a "shame" that Lani was not Abe's daughter. Soaps.com's Lori Wilson described it as a "game-changing secret." Wilson observed that though it's a "massive rewriting for history, it is good to see the Carver/Price family get more story…." Thompson raved about the revelation. "Ooh, this is getting juicy and will throw Lani and her family for a loop." Laurisa said "this one hurts" of the "whopper of a secret." She said it was "maddening" to see a veteran like Abe "stripped of half his family." Tony S. was "miffed" that Abe was involved in the coverup at all. Daytime Confidential's Carly Silver said it brings "major drama" to Lani's life. Brounstein relished in the idea of seeing the cast, Stowers included, play the story out. Stowers "has shown that she has the chops to play that suffering beautifully and she deserves the right to do so as often as possible!" She declared, "This is going to be must-see TV and we can’t wait!"

Wilson categorized the reveal as "classic soap" and said the scenes "were well worth the months of buildup." As she realized her connection to the Carvers was not real, "Lani about broke my heart" said Wilson. "That slap Lani gave Paulina should go down in the soap opera hall of fame" she raved. The secret "exploded in epic fashion" Thompson said of the climax. Ori felt Lani's anger at Paulina was misdirected as Tamara had perpetuated the lie about Abe. Waldo agreed that Tamara's absence was glaring. "It makes no sense to have Lani and Abe Carver (James Reynolds) hooping and hollering at Paulina when they aren’t going to do the same to Tamara who, let’s be frank here, is FAR worse than Paulina given the fact that she’s the one who compounded the lie by naming Abe as Lani’s father." Much like Lani, "I was a mixed bag of emotions" Tony said. "Foremost, I felt for her. She lost Abe as a dad. That would be crushing." Laurisa nominated the plot for "Worst Storyline Direction" on Soap Central's Best & Worst Lists of 2021. "The whole retcon where Lani was now Paulina's daughter felt unnecessary at best and cruel at worst." She categorized the twist as "unnecessary" because there was no shortage of stories to tell for Paulina. "But more than that, this felt super mean to do to Abe." Soap Opera Digest said "The plot twist has propelled Sal Stowers's Lani into a new family dynamic as she has to navigate the fallout." They felt the story gave "Lani much-needed depth." However, the magazine acknowledged that the plot was "unpopular" among viewers. While she admitted the possession storyline was "entertaining," Mary D. wrote to Digest: "I do not appreciate DAYS changing the history of the show by making Paulina Lani's mother, thus meaning Abe is not her father."

=== Relationships ===
The character's early romantic interactions sparked controversy among critics. In 2015, Laurisa from Soap Central felt Lani came off as "desperate" in her pursuit of Rafe. Meanwhile, Soap Opera Digest said Lani and Shawn had "zero chemistry" and described the pair as a "dead-end romance." Ori felt the lack of chemistry was "mostly because the writers haven't bother to give Lani a personality." Tony was initially open to the idea of Lani's romance with Shawn-Douglas when the story started. However, by April 2016, he changed his mind. "When it comes to men, maybe she just shouldn't" he said of Lani's attempts to mix business with pleasure. The critic later described Lani as "cray cray." Tony agreed with Laurisa and said Lani came off as a "sexual predator" that was "a bit obsessive." Tony continued, "She went from "Girl Power!" to "Girl, please." Orlando said "Lani has gone from strange to sleazy." Goldberg also felt Lani was "obsessed" with Shawn-Douglas. Conversely, Ruby's Hub felt Lani handled the split with Shawn "maturely" despite him "leading her on."

Lani's romance with JJ Deveraux garnered very mixed reactions. Akbi Khan of Soap Cities said the duo would "become the Salem pair to watch" and she felt that "Stowers’ mature, grounded energy provides a perfect compliment for Moss’ more boyish vibe." Goldberg said Lani's interaction with JJ "can only bode well for the character." While the writing does not present it that way, Ori saw Lani and JJ's initial fling as rape arguing that JJ was too drunk to consent. He later called it a "ridiculous storyline." "There is no love story between JJ and Lani, and there has never been." Ori said Lani not recognizing JJ was blackout drunk "was disturbing on so many levels… because she's supposed to be a cop." Her further stated that "The problems with this storyline are compounded by the fact that Lani is one of two African-American women on the show, and she's consistently been portrayed as man hungry and amoral." According to Ori, in her interactions with JJ, Lani is written to be "stupid and incompetent." Tony said "this storyline is crashing hard." While he could believe both parties were drunk, he felt Lani the picture Lani took of JJ during their fling was "creepy." "I'm not ok with pretending she's all there" Laurisa said of the inconsistencies in the writing for Lani and JJ. Laurisa was not a fan of the pairing. They "still bore me" she commented. She later said, "I'm barely tolerating Lani by herself" she stated. "I can't root for her as part of any pair. Lani needs some time unconnected so she can develop her character a little more." Some viewers said "JJ and Lani are aired so infrequently that a viewer can quite invest in the character."

Soap Opera Digest was not excited about Lani's undercover drug sting during her relationship with JJ. "This murky, low-stakes 'drama' has never made compelling viewing in the past." On the other hand, Tony was excited to see Lani doing police work again "Lani the Detective is much more "Girl Power!" than the former incarnations of her character." He later said "I hope the Lani we saw last week is the Lani we keep going forward." Laurisa felt JJ coming to Lani's rescue was unnecessary, considering Lani is a trained police officer. However, she said "Stowers has been great in this storyline, especially playing Lani's withdrawal." Laurisa credited the storyline withe helping her connect with the character for the first time. Tony said "I am starting to like Lani more and more each week."

The character's most popular pairing to date is with Eli Grant. A few critics thought the romance between their parents initially made things "awkward." Tony was very intrigued by the duo's dynamic with Gabi Hernandez. Thompson felt the chemistry between Eli and Lani was "much stronger." Of their one-night-stand, Soap Opera Digest said "While not exactly romantic, their interaction was charged with chemistry between portrayers Sal Stowers and Lamon Archey." Ori said their "drunken tryst didn't do Lani any favors either." However, Di Lauro said the "complicated quartet" between the pairing and their exes made for compelling television. She later credited the fall-out after Theo's shooting, including the couple's one-night-stand with helping the series win the Daytime Emmy Award for Outstanding Drama Series in 2018. Fairman praised Stowers for her portrayal of Lani when she is forced to leave Eli at the altar. The actors even made Fairman's "Best of" year-end list in 2019. Kelly Joyner said she "did amazing work expressing her anguish." Kaylor said the couple had "fire chemistry." Sloane praised Stowers as "cool and confident" when Lani crashes Eli and Gabi's wedding.

The duo was quite popular with fans before the romance even blossomed. In 2018, a poll revealed that 47% of viewers favored Lani and Eli over Lani and JJ. Of all the couples affected by the 2020 time jump, Eli and Lani's 2020 reunion was the most highly anticipated among Soap Opera Digest readers. Another poll revealed 77% of fans were also excited for the reunion. Of the 4 weddings happening in the summer of 2020, Eli and Lani's was also the most anticipated. Of the three couples the successfully married, an overwhelming 63% of fans enjoyed Eli and Lani's wedding the most. However, Soap Central criticized the writers for having too many interruptions at the ceremony.
