= Gabi Hernandez =

- Days of Our Lives character
- Cherie Jimenez as Gabi Hernandez
- Portrayed by: Gabriela Rodriguez (2009–2010); Camila Banus (2010–2023); Cherie Jimenez (2024–present)
- Duration: 2009–present
- First appearance: November 20, 2009
- Created by: Dena Higley and Christopher Whitesell
- Introduced by: Ken Corday and Gary Tomlin (2009); Ken Corday, Lisa de Cazotte and Greg Meng (2014); Ken Corday, Albert Alarr and Greg Meng (2015); Ken Corday and Albert Alarr (2020); Ken Corday and Janet Spellman-Drucker (2024)
- Spin-off appearances: Days of Our Lives: A Very Salem Christmas (2021); Days of Our Lives: Beyond Salem (2022)
- Camila Banus as Gabi Hernandez
In-universe information
- Other names: Gabriella Josephina Hernandez; Gabriella Adriana Josephina Hernandez; Gabi Fallon; Gabi DiMera
- Occupation: Image consultant; Model; Waitress; Receptionist; CEO
- Father: Eduardo Hernandez
- Mother: Adrianna Hernandez
- Brothers: Rafe Hernandez; Dario Hernandez
- Sisters: Arianna Hernandez
- Half-sisters: Paige Larson
- Spouse: Nick Fallon (2013); Stefan DiMera (2019–2022, 2023–2025); Li Shin (2022–2023)
- Daughters: Arianna Horton
- Aunts: Estrella

Gabi Hernandez is a fictional character from the American soap opera Days of Our Lives on the NBC network. The role was introduced in 2009, and played by actress Camila Banus from 2010 to 2023. The role was created by Dena Higley and Christopher Whitesell, and originated by actress Gabriela Rodriguez on November 20, 2009. Banus stepped into the role on October 4, 2010. She exited the role in April 2023, and last appeared in November of the same year. In 2024, the role was re-introduced with Cherie Jimenez.

Originally described as a sweet, innocent, and loving girl, a number of events since Gabi's arrival on the series have altered her personality. In 2012, the character experienced a personality shift, which would reveal her manipulative side that was called "crazy" and obsessive. Her storylines have included the death of her sister Arianna Hernandez (Lindsay Hartley), her first love (Will Horton) coming to terms that he is gay, and romances with Chad DiMera (Casey Deidrick/Billy Flynn), Nick Fallon (Blake Berris), JJ Deveraux (Casey Moss), Eli Grant (Lamon Archey), Stefan DiMera (Tyler Christopher/ Brandon Barash) and Jake Lambert (also Barash). Other storylines have included killing Nick, giving birth to Will's daughter, Arianna Horton, going to prison several times, being wrongly accused and imprisoned for the murder of André DiMera and her feuds with Chad, Abigail Deveraux, Julie Olson Williams and Lani Price, amongst others. Gabi is of Latin descent, and Banus has expressed her pride in representing the Hispanic community through her portrayal. Banus' portrayal of Gabi earned her a Daytime Emmy Award nomination for Outstanding Younger Actress in a Drama Series in 2015.

== Casting ==
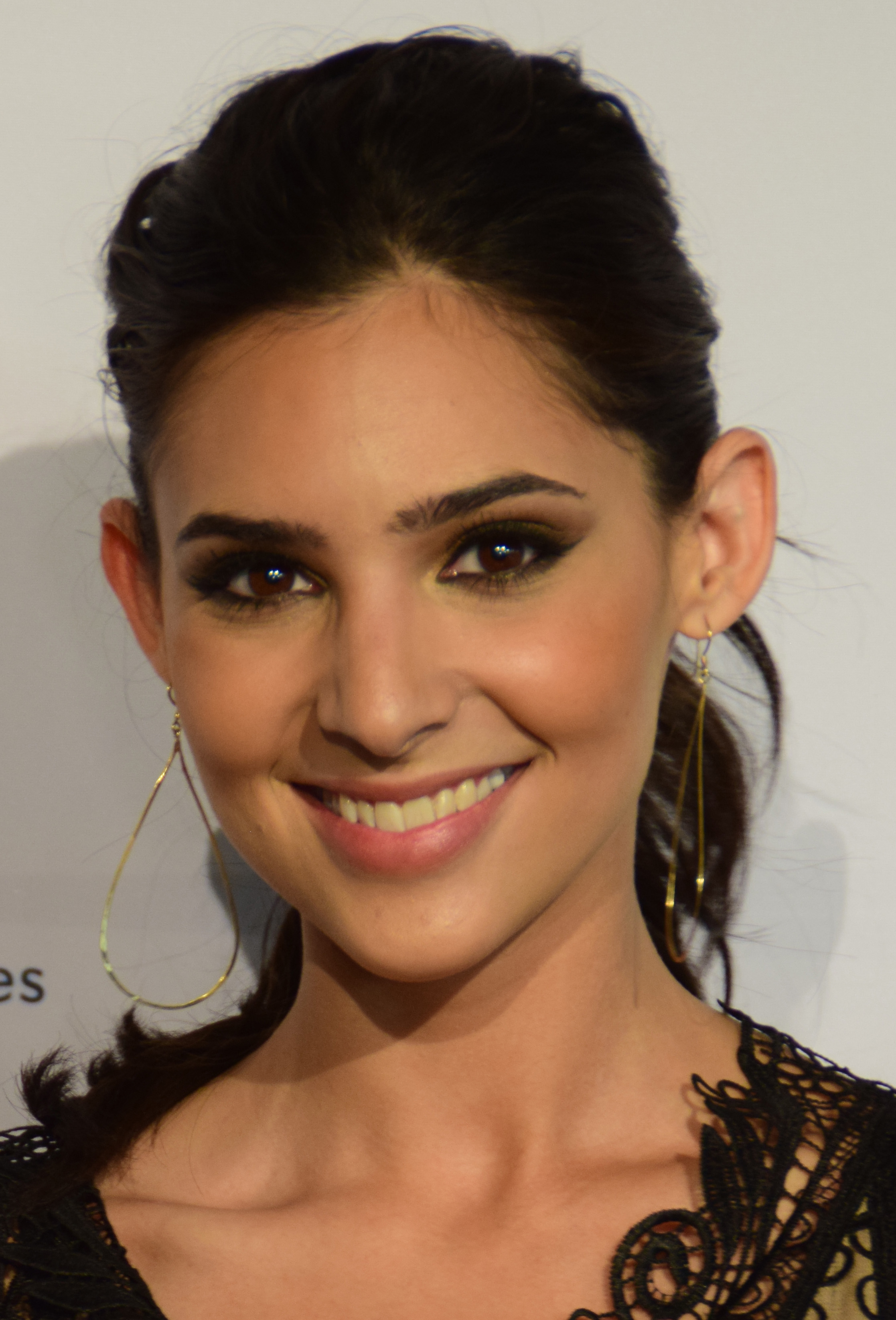
Camila Banus was cast in the role of Gabi Hernandez in 2010; she remained the role until 2023.

Gabriela Rodriguez first appeared in the role of Gabi on November 20, 2009. Of auditioning, Rodriguez said "It was honestly so random. I had never auditioned for a soap opera before and I was like "wow this is different. I think I want to give it a try." She seemed like such a cool girl, I was like "hey let's go for it." [...] I ended up talking with the casting director for a while and she just kind of explained to me about the character [...] The next day I got called for a callback and that was that." Fellow Hispanic actress Camilla Banus had also auditioned. Banus stated "I went in and read for the role. It was actually a pretty long process. The first audition then the second audition, then I went in again to meet the casting director and the producer. They then said they wanted me for a screen test. I did the screen test and they ended up not choosing me. They ended up going with the other girl [Rodriguez]. They told me that they wanted to go a little bit younger for the part."

"So, I put it out of my mind and said ‘Days is over. Keep on moving forward’ and I did."

— Banus on failing to win the part following her audition

In July 2010, Soap Opera Digest reported that Rodriguez had been replaced by Banus. Banus was previously best known for her role as Lola Montez on One Life to Live. Banus, who first aired as Gabi on October 4, 2010, said that the transition was "super easy" and she was welcomed onto the set with "lots of love".

Explaining her being hired by Days of our Lives, Banus said that two months after her initial audition she was again offered the role of Gabi by its casting director due to the character being aged, but rejected them because of other career projects. She recalled thinking "Days is over" again and "they were never going to call me again". Two months after this, Banus received a second call asking her to reconsider; she said "At that point I felt there was something there and that I HAD to do this, like it was something that was calling me and I said, ‘Yes.’" At the 2013 Emmy ceremony, Banus revealed that she would be departing from the series when her current contract expired. Her announcement followed the news that her costars Casey Deidrick and Chandler Massey were also leaving. Banus last aired on June 12, 2014, and briefly appeared from December 22 to 29, 2014. On April 24, 2015, it was confirmed that Banus would be reprising the role of Gabi to take part in the soap's fiftieth anniversary celebrations; Banus returned on September 17, 2015. In April 2018, Banus announced she had extended her deal with the soap for an additional year. In July 2020, it was announced she would once again exit the role; Banus last aired on August 28, 2020. The following month, Corday Productions announced Banus' exit would be short-lived, and that she was scheduled to return to filming in September; Banus’ return aired on November 27, 2020.

In May 2023, TheWrap announced Banus' exit from the soap; she last taped on April 28, and exited during the November 9 episode. In April 2024, Cherie Jimenez was cast in a then-undisclosed role, leading to speculation the character of Gabi had been recast. Two months later, Jimenez's casting as Gabi was announced; she debuted during the June 27 episode.

== Character development ==
=== Characterization and family ===
Initially, Gabi was "sweet" and "innocent". During an interview with TV Source magazine, Rodriguez described Gabi as "very loving", and said "even though sometimes she can come off like loudmouth and just like I guess bratty, but she's not. She's a really good girl and has a really big heart. She loves her brother and sister and would do anything for them." Rodriguez said that she is sensitive, has a strong personality and shows her soft side with people she's "comfortable with", and believed these were all traits Gabi has. Banus feels that she is like Gabi in the sense that she's "very, very sassy", stating "When Gabi has that kind of fiery thing, that’s totally Camila. Gabi is very motherly and likes helping the people that she loves, which is very much like me as well." She said that Gabi is sensitive when people say things about her. Gabi has three siblings: Rafe (Galen Gering), Arianna (Lindsay Hartley) and Dario Hernandez (Francisco San Martín). Rodriguez said that although they get into "little bickering fights every once in a while", the siblings love each other. Banus said that compared to her three siblings, Gabi "is extremely independent, responsible and she has been on her own for a little bit", but noted that "She is a family girl and loves taking care of family." She enjoys working with Galen, having stated "I love working with him. I think he’s my favorite person to work with, because we just have that brother and sister relationship."

Banus loves playing the "evil bitch"-type character, and had that opportunity when Gabi underwent a personality change in 2012. About.com said that she was "the epitome of sweetness and light" but a rocky road led by finding out her first love Will Horton (Chandler Massey) was gay lead the character to undergo a "major personality switch".

Of Gabi's transformation from a "sweet girl" to doing terrible things, Banus said "things I think are going on in Gabi’s head that nobody gets to see". The actress who enjoys playing the "dark side of Gabi" credited Ariana's death as the reasoning for Gabi's life going downhill. The actress sent a message to fans, "I want to tell them to be patient with me. The girl they once knew will come back." The new Gabi was described as "obsessive and crazy" and also "manipulative" and "psycho", which received flack from fans. Banus confessed to seeing the backlash on social media websites including Twitter. She said "People say mean things, but it doesn’t really get to me at all. I’m used to it". She noted that her previous role, Lola Montez on One Life to Live, was worse, stating "When I was on One Life to Live I was worse than Gabi is right now. She was a bad girl. She popped holes in condoms. That’s pretty bad. She took acid. That’s pretty bad."

=== Relationship with Chad DiMera ===
While the role was still being portrayed by Rodriguez, Gabi had a brief romance with Chad DiMera (Casey Jon Deidrick). However, Chad left her for Mia McCormick (Taylor Spreitler). Rodriguez said that Gabi was still into him, but was "heartbroken because they really didn't have a chance at a real relationship. It was just kind of left like on the verge of something new and interesting. She was just starting to like him and she didn't know where it was going." She felt that the relationship had potential, as Gabi still "might have a little thing for him".

"She sees how cute he is, and she thinks there’s something there. Plus, now they’re doing all these sexy modeling shoots wearing God knows what. Or, rather, not wearing God knows what. She wants him."

— Banus on Gabi's attraction to Chad during their photoshoot

In January 2012, the romance was re-visited in a storyline which Deidrick felt that the writers dropped their brief past, and "You'd never know that happened if you were tuning into Days for the first time now." Gabi and Chad became "superstar models" as the new faces of Countess Wilhelmina Cosmetics. This included a "steamy ad campaign", which Banus described as them having "no clothes and they're dripping wet. It's pretty intense." However, Chad was in a committed relationship with Melanie Jonas (Molly Burnett) at the time. On-Air On-Soaps wrote: "So will this be a case of fatal attraction? If so, Melanie better watch out, given that we have seen Banus play man-crazy when she went off the rails as One Life to Live's Lola Montez." Banus felt that it wasn't love, but an infatuation, "[Gabi] is obsessed with having the ideal boyfriend because she has never had an ideal boyfriend. The person she thought was the ideal boyfriend turned out to be gay." She also noted during an interview with TV Guide that "Gabi is attracted to Chad and she sees this modeling thing as a way to be near him." Everyone at the photoshoot felt that they made a good couple, while Deidrick said "Meanwhile, Chad's like, "Huh? What?" He's clueless." Banus called her attraction to Chad a "rebound" from Will; Deidrick said "He's oblivious to her feelings, which is hard because Camila is such a beautiful woman." Gabi was shocked to find out that Chad was dating Melanie when she showed up to the photoshoot and shared a kiss with Chad.

Banus said that Gabi: "sees Chad with Melanie and realizes she is not the girl for Chad. Gabi is the girl for Chad. So she focuses all her time and devotes her energy to making sure that is clear to him. At the point where they are at, I think she would do a lot to get that, and that is where she is at right now." However, she noted that "Melanie, deep down, is really her friend. And honestly, she really does care about Melanie a whole lot and never wants to see her get hurt. Gabi knew Melanie being kidnapped by her stalker, Andrew but didn't do anything because Andrew blackmailed her. Chad discovered this and has since had a bitter vendetta against Gabi, despising her.

=== Relationship with Will Horton ===
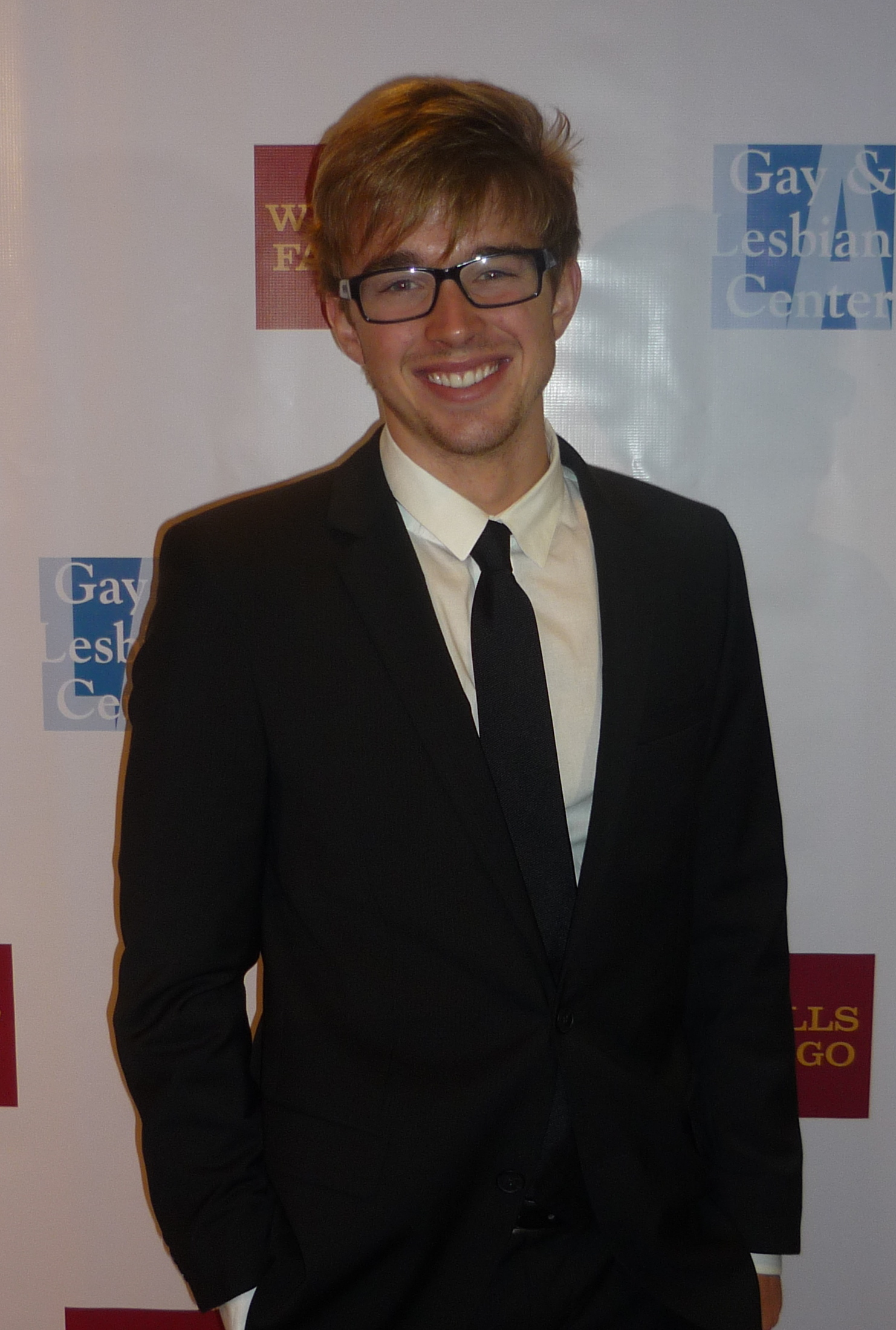
Chandler Massey (pictured) plays Gabi's "first love", Will Horton. The couple split after he came out as gay

Following Arianna's tragic death, Gabi leaned on her sister-in-law Sami Brady's (Alison Sweeney) son, Will Horton (Chandler Massey) for support. Of a possible Will and Gabi pairing, Rodriguez said "I think that would be so perfect. They're so compatible. They're just very good people. I think that would be fun, and I think the audience would like that." Both virgins, the couple had sex. However, Will soon lost all interest in sleeping with her again which was unsettling to Gabi. Banus said "To be completely denied by him in this way is definitely going to make her feel like something is wrong with her." She also stated "Gabi loves Will. Before they were ever boyfriend and girlfriend, they were best friends, who were there for each other." It was then announced by Days of our Lives that Will would come out as gay. Banus looked forward to playing the "fallout", and said "For me there are so many questions [...] How is Gabi going to react? Is she going to turn to somebody [else]? Is she going to break up with Will? Is he going to go behind her back? So many things could happen that could affect Gabi, her brother, Sami ... It's going to be an amazing storyline." Previewing Gabi's reaction, the actress said: "I feel like when it happens she is going to understand what it was. She is going to go through all those occasions where she felt something weird between them and know what it was. Obviously she will feel hurt because she's invested a lot." The couple eventually parted ways.

Banus said that Gabi knew things weren't "completely 100 percent" during their relationship despite the fact that she loves and cares for him. She explained that "when they do break up and he comes out to her, she always honestly feels like everything is her fault. And she blames herself for a lot of things." Chandler said "Will loves her as well. There is just no sexual/physical attraction." Prior, viewers picked up on the fact that Will's lack of physical connection with her became one of Gabi's "minor obsessions". Banus joked that his affection was "all she wants". Chandler noted that "There's no doubt Will loves Gabi [...] It's just not in the 'let's get freaky' way". Additionally, the actor felt that the show "didn't drop the dynamic" of the couple after he came out, but it became "more powerful".

=== Nick Fallon and pregnancy ===
In August 2012, Will and Gabi both ended up having "a bad week" and have sex, despite him previously announcing he was gay. Nothing developed from this. Following her ordeal with Will, Banus said "Gabi needs a man. It’s really important. If she doesn’t get a man soon, she’s going to go ballistic. It needs to be somebody that she doesn’t choose, but they choose her." It was announced that Blake Berris would return as former "braniac" Nick Fallon who was just let out of prison. Banus said that if he was paired with Gabi, they could be "crazy together". Nick and Gabi eventually inched closer and quickly began a romance in October 2012. During an interview with Soap Opera Digest, Banus explained their relationship: "Since both Gabi and Nick were in such dark places in their lives, they don't trust what is happening to them... There's a part of them that feels, I'm not good enough to have this happen." Berris said: "Camila is very funny, and I'm not sure she gets to play that often on screen." Additionally, Berris said of the pairing: "I love Camila. She’s awesome, and Nick and Gabi are an interesting pairing. Both characters have gone through so much. I like how slowly they built [the relationship]. Nick was almost freaked out about what would happen to him, if he got involved with somebody."

That November, Gabi received shocking news that she was pregnant. Janet Di Lauro of About.com said "Let's face it. It's a move viewers saw coming, after a down-and-out Gabi shared a night of passion with her gay ex, Will." Gabi nearly had an abortion but decided to go ahead with the pregnancy. Despite Will being the unborn baby's biological father, Gabi and Nick convinced Will to let them raise the baby as their own. He agreed, and they have begun planning their wedding. At the wedding, Chad—still nursing a grudge over her part in his breakup with Melanie—announces that Gabi was pregnant when she and Nick met. This makes Will admit to being the father of Gabi's baby. She and Nick get married in March 2013. Nick blackmails Will into giving up his parental rights. She gives birth to her daughter, Arianna Grace Horton in May 2013 and Nick—after Will saves his life—allows Will to be her father. When he reveals to Gabi about his blackmailing Will and not wanting him in her or the baby's life because Will is gay, she seeks an annulment.

When Nick plots to remove Will from Arianna's life and become her primary guardian, Gabi and Nick have a physical altercation in which Gabi strikes him with a rock to keep him from raping her, "killing" him (or so she believes). Sami and Kate help Gabi dump him in the river in which he wakes up before believing he drowned. However, he returns continues to blackmail Gabi until the character is killed in a whodunit murder mystery.

== Storylines ==
=== 2009–2014 ===
Gabriella Josephina Hernandez is born in 1992 or 1993 in Salem, Illinois. She is the younger sister of Rafe, the late Arianna, and Dario Hernandez. Rafe and Arianna felt that they were being stalked while at the Brady pub, but were shocked to find out that Gabi had come to Salem and was spying on them. Initially in town for her winter break, Gabi decided to permanently move to Salem, and moved into a vacant room at the Brady Pub. Arianna and Gabi briefly argued but eventually bonded. She befriended other local teens including Chad Peterson-Woods (later revealed to be Chad DiMera). They briefly dated, but he left her for Mia. Saddened by the break-up, Gabi focused herself fully on school. She befriended Will Horton who attended the Salem High formal as her date. Arianna was killed in a hit-and-run accident. She leaned on Will for support and they shared their first kiss. The couple's romance deepened as they were there for one another during mutual times of crisis. They slept together, but Gabi noticed that Will didn't want to sleep with her again. He later came out as gay, and they split up. Gabi earned a job at Quinn Hudson's (Bren Foster) Intensity Day Spa and developed another crush on Chad, and began scheming to break him and his girlfriend Melanie Jonas (Molly Burnett) up. To make Chad worry over her, she pretended to have a stalker, writing fake threatening notes. Chad had Gabi move in with him. So further keep up with her lie, she hired a guy named Andrew to pose as her stalker. Eventually, Andrew's actions became too much and Gabi told him to stop. He ended up kidnapping Melanie, to Gabi's knowledge. Andrew blackmailed Gabi into not telling anybody about Melanie. The truth was eventually revealed, and Chad hated Gabi for it. Feeling down, she ended up having a one night stand with Will, but agreed that it was a mistake. Chad consistently reminded Gabi that she would continue to pay for what she did. She then began a relationship with Nick, who was released from jail after serving time because he kidnapped Melanie. Nick reassured everyone he was a changed man. Chad assaulted Nick, who promised not to press charges if Chad dropped his threats towards Gabi, which he did. Gabi and Nick began planning their happy future, but she realized that she was pregnant with Will's child. Eventually, Gabi, Nick and Will decided that they would pretend that Nick is the father, and Gabi and Nick decided to get married. But when Gabi accidentally let it slip that she is further along than she originally said, Nick covered for her, saying that the two had a one-night stand the day they met. Despite there being some anger at this, everyone has accepted the duo as a couple, except for Chad, who wants Gabi to pay for her misdeeds. Chad told Sonny Kiriakis, Will's boyfriend, about Gabi's role in Melanie's kidnapping. Ever since, Sonny has cut all his ties to Gabi and warned Will to avoid her. On May 20, 2013, Gabi gave birth to a daughter, Arianna Grace Horton, after Gabi's sister and Rafe's deceased goddaughter. Nick finally tells Gabi about what happened to him in prison, and what he did to Will. Gabi moves in with Will, Sonny and baby Arianna and her marriage to Nick is annulled. Despite being divorced, Nick continued to be obsessed with Gabi. When Gabi refused his advances, he tried to rape her. Gabi took a rock and bashed Nick on the head. Sami and Kate arrived and help Gabi throw Nick's body in the water. Nick briefly woke up before sinking into the water, and Gabi was haunted by the fact that they had let him die. On the day of Arianna's christening, Nick showed up at the ceremony alive, and lied about the events that happened that night. Nick wanted to reconcile with Gabi and slowly spent time with her and Arianna. He tried to get Gabi to take Arianna away from Will, but was eventually shot and killed with Gabi revealed to be the shooter. Gabi explained that she was scared of Nick's influence over her and felt she had to kill him to stop him from being a threat to Arianna. She also admitted her role in Melanie's kidnapping and told Marlena about her, Kate and Sami throwing Nick in the river. EJ, who served as Gabi's lawyer, thought it would be better for her to have a plea deal than go to trial and have the truth about Melanie's kidnapping come out. Gabi accepted the plea deal and got ten to twenty years in prison.

Gabi is visited by Rafe and later on by Will, Sonny and Arianna for the holidays. She gets another visitor, but it's Melanie, instead of Will and Sonny, who forgave Gabi her past decisions.

=== 2015–2023 ===
Gabi is released from prison in September 2015 and shares a happy reunion with Rafe, Will and Arianna thanks to an error made in her sentencing. As Gabi settles back into her life and relaunches her modeling career when Kate hires her at Basic Black working opposite retired baseball player Paul Narita (Christopher Sean), she is devastated when Will is murdered by a serial killer. The killings lead to Gabi's reunion with her estranged father Eduardo (A Martinez) for the first time since she was an infant as one of the serial killer victims is Gabi's half-sister Paige (True O'Brien). In December 2015, Gabi bonds with JJ Deveraux (Casey Moss) and they begin dating, but the romance is short-lived and he cheated on her with Abe's daughter, Lani. In 2016, her best friend Abigail Devereaux DiMera (JJ's sister) is presumed dead, and Gabi later begins a relationship with her husband Chad. But in November 2016, Chad's wife Abigail returns to Salem and they reconcile, so Gabi tries to ignore her feelings for Chad. Chad and Gabi are locked in a meat locker by Deimos Kiriakis and Chad tells Gabi he loves her. Abigail, with the help of Gabi's brother Dario, who has developed feelings for Abigail himself, rescue them. Chad tells Abigail that he still has feelings for Gabi, but that he loves Abigail and wants to keep his marriage, and eventually decides he must remove Gabi from his life entirely. The day that Chad decides to tell Gabi this, Deimos kidnaps Abigail and Gabi and poisons them both and gives Chad only enough antidote to save one of the women, forcing him to choose which woman would live and which would die. Chad, however, gives half of the antidote to each one, saving both of their lives.

When Gabi recovered from the poison, Andre DiMera (Thaao Penghlis) warned her about coming in between Abigail and Chad. Gabi supported Chad and Abigail's plans to remarry, but Abigail broke it off with Chad. At the time, Gabi was dating Eli Grant (Lamon Archey). Gabi went to Greece where Chad and Eli both went for different reasons. Chad went to procure an amulet that was said to be cursed and Eli went with Hope, Rafe, Lani, and JJ to capture Deimos. Eli saw Gabi had feelings for Chad and broke up with her. Deimos was successfully apprehended and Hope and Rafe brought him back to Salem. Gabi, Eli, JJ, Sonny, and Paul all went with Chad, but their plane crashed, stranding them on a desert island. Gabi realized Chad had the amulet with him when he told her he had gotten rid of it, and convinced him to bury it in the sand. Gabi and Chad admitted they had feelings for each other and slept together. Paul ended up contracting jungle madness, and ended up attacking Gabi. They were rescued by John and Marlena and returned safely to town. Andre warned Gabi not to hurt Chad, and subtly threatened her by telling her to watch her back. Gabi and Chad continued seeing each other while Abigail got ready to marry Dario. Gabi supported the marriage, but Chad was skeptical of the rush to get married. Everything culminated with the death of Deimos, and Abigail's desire to protect Chad, which led to her getting struck by a car and the revelation that Abigail had only married Dario to stop his deportation, which he lied about and then later blackmailed her to stay married to him. Gabi realized Chad still loved Abigail and broke up with him.

Gabi stumbled upon evidence that Dario had sent to implicate Commissioner Lou Raines (Aaron D. Spears) as his partner. Raines finds out and held Gabi hostage. Eli saved Gabi by shooting Raines in the shoulder, and he was apprehended. Gabi and Eli reconnected as he taught her self defense, and eventually rekindled their romance. After JJ accidentally shot Theo Carver (Kyler Pettis), he struggled with the guilt and planned to commit suicide. Gabi found out and was furious with JJ. Concerned, Gabi stayed overnight to make sure JJ was alright. Gabi went to work for DiMera after signing a contract that had GabiChic work under them. Chad and Andre's long lost brother Stefan DiMera (Brandon Barash) came to town and took over DiMera. Stefan subtly flirted with Gabi, though he was interested in Abigail. Gabi was shocked and angry when Andre severed their contract with Gabi, and used a loophole to steal GabiChic from her. Gabi was furious with Andre and vowed to make him pay. The next morning, Andre was found dead on the floor of the office with blood leaking from a head wound, and the murder weapon, the furnace that contained the ashes of Tony DiMera (Thaao Penghlis), lay on the floor underneath his desk with the lid missing and the ashes scattered across the floor. Security footage showed a woman that resembled Gabi leaving the office with the lid, but Gabi swore she did not kill Andre.

Gabi found out that Eli and Lani had slept together and surmised that he was the father of Lani's baby, so she broke up with him. The missing lid showed up in Gabi's purse and she attempted to get rid of it, but Lani caught her and arrested her. Chad and Abigail wee convinced that Stefan had hired someone to pose as Gabi and kill Andre. Chad vowed to find the woman, but ultimately failed. At Gabi's trial, Abigail claimed that Gabi confessed to her that she killed Andre. Gabi was found guilty and sent to prison where she was left bitter and angry that Abigail would betray her like that. Gabi was attacked in prison by a woman named Diane, who had been Raines’ girlfriend and blamed her for Raines arrest. Gabi was beaten nearly to death and hospitalized. Diane attempted to finish the neck and wound up dead with a needle in her neck. Abigail finally remembered that she had killed Andre, and soon after developed DID. It was her altar, Gabby, that left the office with the lid, and her other altar, Dr. Laura, that had lied about Gabi killing Andre. Abigail confessed and attempted to apologize to Gabi, but she was furious with Abigail and her release was delayed while they investigated Diane's murder. Gabi was released when someone else bragged about killing Diane.

Upon her release, Gabi found out she suffered internal injuries from her attack that made it hard for her to have children. Gabi found out Chad was the father of Abigail's baby when Kayla Brady (Mary Beth Evans) left the paternity results on her desk, so Gabi burned the paternity test and forged a new one that said Stefan was the father. Abigail planned to get an abortion, so Gabi, preying on hers and Abigail's friendship went to Stefan and told him Abigail was pregnant and that he was the father. Stefan stopped Abigail from having an abortion. Later on, Gabi went to Kayla and asked for some sleeping medication that was pregnancy safe. She drugged Abigail with the medications and send a message to Stefan from her phone, so to make him believe it was from Abigail's altar, Gabby, whom Stefan had fallen for. Kate found out about Gabi's plot, and Gabi convinced her to keep quiet, eventually resorting to blackmail once Kate got in too deep and expressed reservations. Gabi's plan started to work perfectly as Chad, JJ, and Jennifer all feared Abigail was relapsing. With Kate to back her up, whom Chad trusted, it was easy to convince him. Chad left Abigail and moved into the Kiriakis mansion where Gabi was already living, and she bonded with him as her plan as to have Abigail committed and raise her children with Chad. Abigail was the only one who was suspicious of Gabi.

Gabi upped the ante by dressing Abigail as Gabby and putting her in the DiMera mansion. She then whacked herself in the head with a tray and claimed Gabby had attacked her and Kate supported her story. As Chad planned to have Abigail committed, Abigail got a quick divorce from Chad and married Stefan. Luckily for Gabi, Chad was persistent and managed to get Stefan to commit Abigail. Gabi visited Abigail and gloated to Abigail, confessing everything. Abigail attacked Gabi and Chad ran in and broke them up. Abigail had no proof, so Chad continued to fall for Gabi's lies. Kate convinced Gabi to tell Chad the truth about his child, so Gabi printed a new copy from Kayla's computer and planned to make it look like Stefan had switched the results, but Stefan almost caught her and she was unable to plant the results in the mansion. Later, by Abigail's request to expose Gabi for her lies, Julie sneaked into the Kiriakis mansion and discovered the test results in Gabi's room. Gabi caught Julie with the evidence, who threatened to tell Chad everything. The two fought and Julie fell down the stairs. Julie was rushed to the hospital shortly after Chad and Sonny came to her aid. Desperate to keep Julie quiet, Gabi sneaked into Julie's room later that night in an attempt to suffocate her with a pillow, but was eventually caught by Abigail who accused her of pushing her down the stairs. Gabi continues to taunt Abigail's illness and gloats innocence... until Julie woke up and eventually told Abigail the truth, who then told Chad. A furious Chad threatened to send Gabi to prison, vowing to separate her from her only daughter the same way she separated Abigail from hers and her son. Abigail however chose not to press charges against Gabi, despite Chad's objection; but she also chose to permanently end her friendship with Gabi and wished her the best as they went on their separate ways.

== Reception ==
Janet Di Lauro of About.com said that the character is crazy and "naughty." Of being the only Hispanic during her time on Days of Our Lives, Banus stated in 2012: "I’m definitely grateful. I’m proud be a Latina, and I’m really proud to represent for all the Latinas out there; especially the young Latina women. It’s important for them to have a role. I feel really empowered to be the young Latina on the show, and I have no problem carrying all of the responsibility on my back." Banus' portrayal of Gabi earned her a nomination for Outstanding Younger Actress in a Drama Series at the 42nd Daytime Emmy Awards in 2015. Charlie Mason from Soaps She Knows placed Gabi at #19 on a list of the 35 most memorable characters from Days of Our Lives, saying "Admit it: No matter how spiteful a plot the impetuous supervixen hatches, you not only root for her to get away with it, you root for her to get the kinda happy ending that might afford her a new beginning."

On December 14, 2024, Soap Opera News named the casting of Jimenez as Gabi as their top recast of the year, sharing the recognition with Alexa Havins Bruening as Lulu Spencer on General Hospital. The website complimented: "And then there's Jimenez, who stole our hearts from the very beginning. She missed no beats!"
