= JJ Deveraux =

American soap opera character

- Days of Our Lives character
- Casey Moss as JJ Deveraux
- Portrayed by: Tyler Lake (2004); Jake and Nick Ravo (2005); Jacob and Micah Reeves (2005–2006); Casey Moss (2013–present)
- Duration: 2004–2006; 2013–2020; 2022; 2024–present
- First appearance: November 12, 2004
- Created by: James E. Reilly
- Introduced by: Ken Corday and Stephen Wyman (2004); Ken Corday, Lisa de Cazotte and Greg Meng (2013); Ken Corday and Albert Alarr (2020, 2022); Ken Corday and Janet Spellman-Drucker (2024)
In-universe information
- Other names: Jack Patrick Deveraux, Jr.
- Occupation: Emergency medical technician (2018–2024); Detective (2017–2018, since 2025); Police cadet (2015–2017)
- Father: Jack Deveraux
- Mother: Jennifer Horton
- Sisters: Abigail Deveraux
- Half-sisters: Gwen Rizczech
- Grandfathers: Duke Johnson; Bill Horton; Harper Deveraux (adoptive)
- Grandmothers: Jo Johnson; Laura Horton; Camille Deveraux (adoptive)
- Uncles: Steve Johnson; Mike Horton; Lucas Horton
- Aunts: Adrienne Johnson Kiriakis
- Nephews: Thomas DiMera
- Nieces: Charlotte DiMera
- First cousins: Jeremy Horton; Stephanie Johnson; Victor Kiriakis II (adoptive); Joey Kiriakis (adoptive); Sonny Kiriakis; Will Horton; Allie Horton; Joey Johnson; Tripp Dalton

JJ Deveraux is a fictional character from the original NBC soap opera, Days of Our Lives. Born onscreen in 2004, the character was portrayed by several child actors between 2004 and 2006. In 2013, Casey Moss joined the cast as a rapidly aged JJ.

JJ is the son of supercouple Jack Deveraux and Jennifer Horton and younger brother of Abigail Deveraux. The character is a member of the original core family, the Horton family as well as the Johnson family. JJ shares a connection to several of the show's most popular characters and is considered a legacy character. JJ's first significant storyline launched in 2013 and focused on his rebellion following his father's death and his feud with his mother's new boyfriend, Dr. Daniel Jonas.

In 2014, JJ's storyline shifts to him meeting Paige Larson (True O'Brien), JJ cheating on Paige with her mother, Eve Donovan, and Paige discovering their affair on her birthday in 2015. Further relationships have included Gabi Hernandez (Camila Banus) and Lani Price (Sal Stowers). In 2019, he began experiencing a romantic connection with Haley Chen (Thia Megia).

Moss' performance has been met with critical acclaim, having garnered him a Daytime Emmy Award nomination for Outstanding Younger Actor in a Drama Series in 2018.

== Casting ==
Though he is born on September 3, 2004, the role was originated by Tyler Lake on November 12, 2004. Lake last appeared on December 20, 2004. Siblings Jake and Nick Ravo debuted on April 25, 2005, and last appeared in October of that year. Jacob and Micah Reeves stepped into the role in December 2005 and last appeared on September 21, 2006. Casey Moss first auditioned for the role in October 2012, and screen tested with Melissa Reeves, who plays Jennifer Horton, in November. Moss began taping in January 2013. In March 2013, Moss was spotted in a cast photo published by The News Tribune next to Reeves. Immediately fans began speculating who he could be with some assuming Moss was the new JJ. Fan speculation went into overdrive when another new cast member, Jen Lilley tweeted about Moss joining the cast and told fans to follow the actor on Twitter. NBC eventually confirmed that Moss had been cast as JJ. Moss first appeared on May 7, 2013. In January 2020, it was announced that Moss would exit the role, with his last appearance being on February 18. In August of the same year, it was announced he would reprise the role; he returned on November 5, and departed on November 27.

Moss briefly returned as JJ from June 29 to July 18, 2022 for the funeral of JJ's sister, Abigail Deveraux.

In June 2024, it was reported that Moss would be reprising the role; Moss made his return on October 17, 2024.

== Development ==
Upon Moss's debut, the character's age is revised to 17 placing his birth in 1995. Moss's JJ was described as Jack and Jennifer's "troubled teenage son," who returns from boarding school in London with a chip on his shoulder. CBS Soaps In Depth hinted that JJ would be in very heavy story. According to Moss, JJ is acting out because he is "in a state of confusion." Moss also explained that JJ's actions are because he is "still troubled by his father's death." Moss described the character as "very loving" and also "heartbroken." Upon his re-introduction, JJ is "all over the place and doesn't really know who he is yet." Moss revealed to Soap Opera Digest that JJ is going through the process of "becoming a man." In the midst of JJ's scheming, the series introduced Kevin Riggin as JJ's partner in crime Rory. The two begin selling drugs to make quick cash. JJ falls in with the wrong crowd because he longs to feel a connection. However, JJ does not have to worry about forming a "real bond", Moss told Soap Opera Digest. Abigail is immediately concerned but JJ resents his sister and mother as "he doesn't feel they grieved his father's death." JJ's anger reaches a climax when he gets into an altercation with Daniel but according to Moss, JJ had been looking for a fight. Soaps In Depth referred to Moss's character as "Hurricane JJ!" His return home isn't what he expected and he is uncomfortable that his mother has moved on. JJ feels that his family has "forgotten" about Jack. Though Jack wasn't always physically present, JJ felt a "sense of security" knowing his father was at least out there somewhere. When he finally does come, JJ does not feel that anymore. JJ definitely wants his mother to find happiness again but he feels it is too soon. Of the circumstances surrounding JJ's return, Moss hinted that there is more to JJ's story. According to Moss, JJ is at a point in his life where he is still a good kid, who is making bad choices.

== Storylines ==
Jack Patrick "JJ" Deveraux is born as the son of Jennifer (Melissa Reeves) and Jack (Matthew Ashford). JJ is named after his father and Patrick Lockhart (Brody Hutzler). JJ is born on the island of Melaswen after Jennifer goes in search of his father Jack who is believed to have been killed by the Salem Stalker long before JJ's birth. Jack and Jennifer are reunited on the island and JJ meets his father. After several near death experiences, the family makes it back to Salem. Upon their reunion, the family relocates to London where Jack and Jennifer get jobs as reporters.

JJ reappears in Salem in May 2013 after getting kicked out of boarding school. JJ's lies quickly catch up to him when his school reveals that he was expelled due to him knowing about his roommate selling drugs on campus. Jennifer enrolls JJ in summer school, while JJ immediately dislikes Jennifer's new boyfriend, Dr. Daniel Jonas (Shawn Christian). Abigail (Kate Mansi) is immediately weary of JJ's excuses and interrogates him often. JJ and his friend Rory go so far as to vandalize Daniel's car, but JJ continues to claim innocence in everything he does which causes tension between his mother and Daniel. When JJ and Rory cannot make enough money selling pot, JJ sets his sights on Abigail's doctor boyfriend, Cameron Davis (Nathan Owens) and steals medication from the hospital. After learning about what his father did to Kayla Brady (Mary Beth Evans), JJ vandalized the town square, until Daniel came and was able to subdue JJ. At his hearing, JJ is given one final chance. Later that night, JJ is with Theresa Donovan (Jen Lilley) when she overdoses. Scared, JJ calls Daniel for help. After realizing that Daniel was a good person and how close he came to being sent to jail, JJ begins to turn his life around.

In March 2014, he meets Paige Larson (True O'Brien), who he is immediately attracted to. JJ and Paige begin dating, but Paige's mother Eve Donovan (Kassie DePaiva) plots to break them up. In November 2014, JJ begins to have an on and off affair with Eve. In May 2015, on Paige's birthday, she learns of their affair and isolates herself from them and begins to plot revenge.

JJ starts working for the DEA in July 2015 and finds out that Kyle Southern, who is dating Paige, is a dealer and is instructed to find out who his boss is. JJ starts posing as a drug dealer and "working" with Kyle in order to find out who his boss is. Paige starts to suspect that JJ is dealing and even confronts his mom, who denies it, as she is aware he is working for the DEA. JJ sneaks into Kyle's apartment, determined to find something that could help him in the investigation. While he's there Kyle and Paige return. Paige helps JJ hide and makes out with Kyle in order to distract him as JJ leaves. Paige finds out that JJ is working for the DEA and agrees to help him. Eve, who also finds out, tells Kyle of JJ's true motives and tips off the police. Kyle confronts JJ who denies his involvement with the cops. It is revealed that Clyde Weston is Kyle's boss. Clyde kills Kyle, but JJ manages to convince him that he is not working for the DEA. Clyde tells him that if he tells anyone, he will go after Abigail, Paige and Jennifer.

Paige and JJ reconnect and JJ tells her to stay safe and that he loves her. She kisses him and later, she calls him and tells him that she has something important to tell him, and asks him to meet her at her dorm. JJ arrives at Paige's dorm and finds the door unlocked and her dead, strangled in the shower. He and Eve are both heartbroken.

JJ believes that Clyde killed Paige and tells Jennifer who persuades him to go to the cops. However, when he does, Clyde shows up and JJ pretends he was there to check on Paige's murder investigation. Clyde then gives Roman false information that he saw Chad outside Paige's dorm building around the time she was killed.

JJ later puts Clyde in jail and wants to become a cop but Jennifer and Abigail are against his decision because they both think that he is making too quick of a decision and his mother Jennifer wants him to finish college before he thinks about putting his life in danger. He also begins to pursue a relationship with Gabi Hernandez. After their break-up, he starts seeing Lani Price (Sal Stowers). Things take a worse turn when he shoots his girlfriend's brother Theo Carver and gets suspended and charged. Unable to deal with the guilt of shooting Theo who sadly slipped into coma, he breaks up with Lani. The charges then get dropped, but on Christmas Eve knowing he was responsible for Theo's shooting, he attempts suicide, but is stopped by Gabi Hernandez when she happens to show up at his hotel room. She spends the night with him just to keep him safe. The next day, JJ gets back together with his ex girlfriend, Lani. He then learns that she is pregnant, but wrongly believes the baby is his, when in fact it is Eli's after their one night stand on the Christmas Eve. He decides not to go back to being a detective Instead, he becomes interested in a new career as an emergency medical technician. He breaks up with Lani after learning that she had cheated on him and is expecting someone else's baby. They decide they are better off as friends.

In December 2018, JJ comes to the aid of Haley Chen, a nurse at University Hospital, who attempted suicide. He befriends her and invites her to Doug's place for the New Year's Eve party. As their connection builds, she confides in him about being an illegal immigrant, and they grow closer and even share a few kisses. After JJ confides in a recently returned Jack about Haley's immigration status and he reveals it during a televised debate for Mayor, his relationship with Haley begins to deteriorate. When she is eventually arrested, JJ pleads for Haley's forgiveness and in an effort to make up for the mistake, JJ offers to marry Haley in order to help her avoid deportation; she declines the proposal and marries Tripp Dalton instead in order to get a green card. Just a few days after the wedding, she confesses the truth about the fake marriage and gets arrested. As she is about to deported, JJ saves her in the last minute and they become fugitives. JJ turns himself in after learning of his mother's arrest.

== Reception ==
Michael Fairman described the character's return as "long-awaited" and said Moss would "add to the young hunk quotient in Salem!" Jillian Bowe immediately hoped that Moss's JJ would cause trouble for Jennifer and Daniel. Moss was voted as the #1 soap newcomer in the June 10, 2013 issue of Soap Opera Digest with 34% of votes. Jamey Giddens praised Moss and claimed him as a "breakout, young adult star." According to Giddens, JJ becomes a voice for the fans of Jack and Jennifer who were upset about the Daniel/Jennifer (Dannifer) pairing. "I absolutely love it when he gives Jennifer and Abigail grief for being able to so readily replace Jack with Daniel," remarked Giddens. Giddens hoped JJ would cause even more trouble by "hooking up" with Jennifer's rival, and Daniel's ex-wife, Chloe Lane (Nadia Bjorlin). Laurisa Mahlin of Soap Central praised the dynamic in contrast to the usual romantic triangle for Dannifer. Mahlin explained that even though JJ is acting horribly, it was enough for most fans that he caused trouble for the hated pairing. Jamey Giddens later said that Moss's JJ was the "best foil ever" for the couple and that JJ gave the pairing a rooting factor.
