= Ashley Puzemis =

American actress

- Born: April 9, 2001 (age 25); Detroit, Michigan
- Occupation: Actress

Ashley Puzemis is an American actress. She is best known for playing Holly Jonas in the soap opera Days of Our Lives.

== Early life ==
Puzemis was born in Detroit, Michigan on April 9, 2001.

== Career ==
Early in her career she made appearances in BF for Hire, Danger Force and The Sex Lives of College Girls. Her first big role came playing Holly Jonas in the soap opera Days of Our Lives. She secured the role of Holly after several chemistry reads with actors from the show. She found out she got the role the day before her birthday For her performance as Holly she received a nomination for best emerging talent at the 77th Primetime Emmy Awards.

== Personal life ==
She has a professional relationship with her on-screen grandmother, Suzanne Rogers, whom she stated provided a welcome to the set.

== Filmography ==
=== Film ===
Year	Title	Role	Notes
2016	Dear Papa	Jessica	Short
2017	A Slice to Die For	Jenna	Short
2018	Culture Clash	Tiffany	
2019	T.I.M.	Goth Girl	Short
2020	Beware of Mom	Lena	
2024	The Midway Point	Sophia	
2025	Reason to Believe	Missy	

=== Television ===
Year	Title	Role	Notes
2020	BF for Hire	Chelsea	3 episodes
2022	The Sex Lives of College Girls	Rush #1	Episode; Will You Be My Girlfriend?
2023	Danger Force	Kennedy	Episode; SwellMelonFest
2023–present	Days of Our Lives	Holly Jonas	155 episodes
