= True O'Brien =

American model and actress

- Born: Los Angeles, California, U.S.
- Occupations: Actress; model
- Years active: 2012–present
- Spouse: Casey Moss (m. 2025)
- Relatives: Hailee Steinfeld (cousin)
- Modeling information
- Agency: Ford Models (Los Angeles)

True O'Brien is an American model and actress. She is known for her role as Paige Larson on NBC's soap opera Days of Our Lives, for which she has won a Daytime Emmy Award for Outstanding Younger Actress in a Drama Series.

== Early life ==
O'Brien was born in Los Angeles, California, to Elizabeth Marie (née Domasin), a housewife, and John Richard O'Brien, a graphic designer. Her maternal first cousin is actress Hailee Steinfeld. Her maternal grandfather Ricardo Domasin was of half Filipino (from Bohol) and half African-American descent. Her maternal great-uncle is former child actor Larry Domasin.

== Career ==
O'Brien is signed with Ford Models. She started at the age of five when her mother got her into television commercials, and subsequently got into modeling at the age of 13. During her teenage years, she modeled for Guess and Pottery Barn. O'Brien appeared in the Girlfriend perfume campaign with Justin Bieber, and as his second girlfriend in his music video, "One Time". She began her acting career in 2012, when she guest starred in an episode of Jessie playing the role of Diamond Bloodworth.

In 2014, she joined the cast of the soap opera Days of Our Lives, portraying the role of Paige Larson; her episode debuted on March 3, 2014. O'Brien is signed to a two-year deal with the series. In June 2015, it was reported that she was let go from the series, and last appeared on September 9, 2015. In 2016, she joined the series Queen Sugar as Stella.

== Personal life ==
In 2015, O'Brien began a relationship with her former Days of Our Lives co-star Casey Moss. They became engaged on June 9, 2022. On May 25, 2025 it was revealed that the couple had gotten married.

== Filmography ==
Year	Title	Role	Notes
2012	Jessie	Diamond Bloodworth	Episode: "Trashin' Fashion"
2014–2015 2017, 2020	Days of Our Lives	Paige Larson	Series regular 2014–2015; Guest 2017 and 2020
2016	Queen Sugar	Stella	Episodes: "Thy Will Be Done" and "The Darker Sooner"
2016	Code Black	Joy Samton	Episode: "Hero Complex"
2018	Taco Bell: Web of Fries	Millennial	Short film
2025	Recipe for Romance	Sari	Television film

Music video roles
Year	Title	Artist	Role
2009	"One Time"	Justin Bieber	Extra

== Awards and nominations ==
List of acting awards and nominations
Year	Award	Category	Title	Result	Ref.
2016	Daytime Emmy Award	Outstanding Younger Actress in a Drama Series	Days of Our Lives	Won	
