= Camila Banus =

American actress (born 1990)

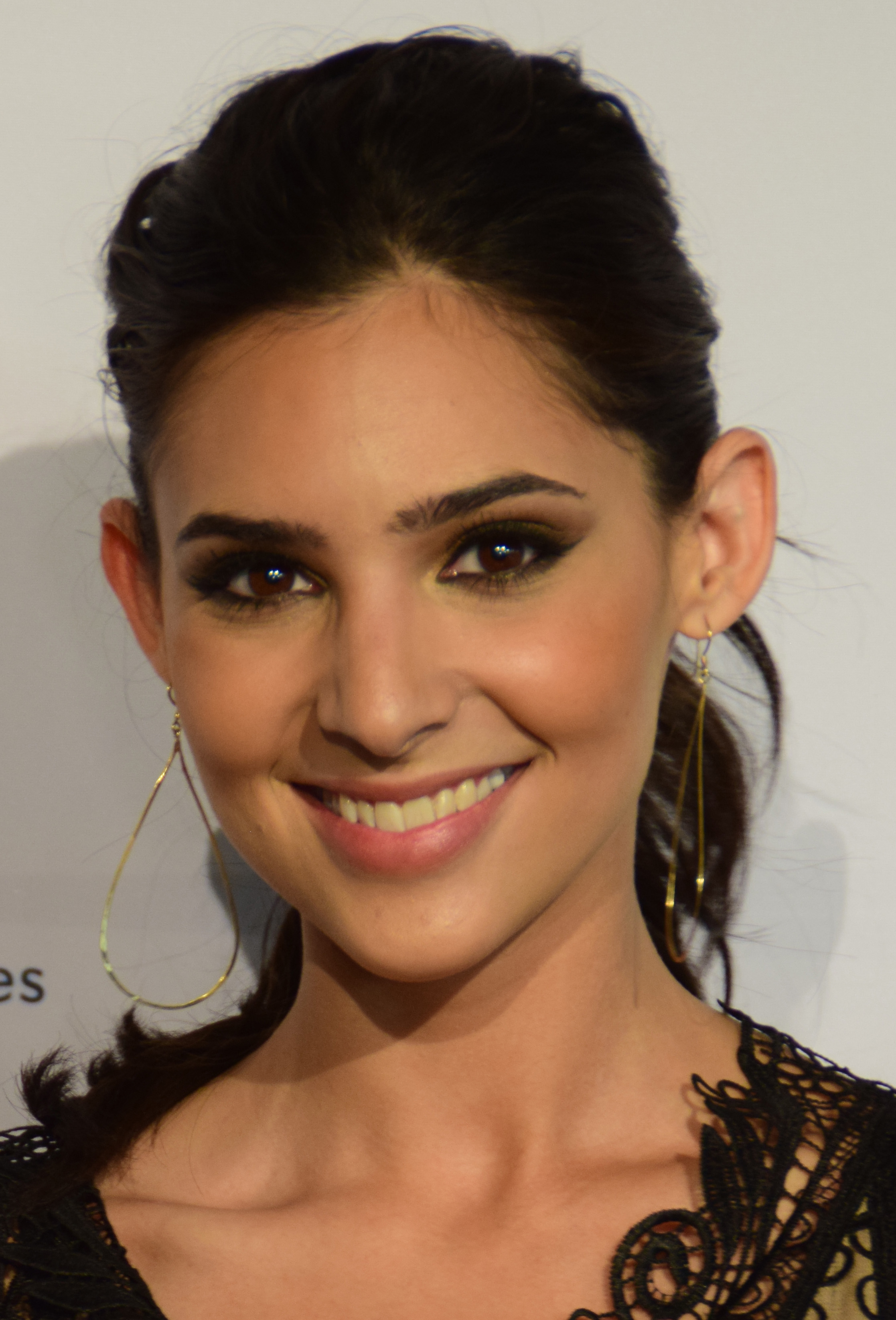
- Banus in May 2015
- Born: July 22, 1990 (age 36); Miami Beach, Florida, U.S.
- Occupation: Actress
- Years active: 2005–present
- Spouse: Marlon Aquino (m. 2021)

Camila Banus (born July 22, 1990) is an American actress. She is known for playing the roles of Lola Montez on the ABC Daytime soap opera One Life to Live (2008 to 2009), Gabi Hernandez on the NBC Daytime soap opera Days of Our Lives (2010 to 2023), and Nina Ferrera on the Fox series Star (2018). In 2015, Banus was nominated for a Daytime Emmy Award for Outstanding Younger Actress in a Drama Series for her work on Days of Our Lives.

== Early life ==
Banus was born in Miami Beach, Florida. She has a younger sister, Gabriela Banus, who is also an actress. She is of Spanish and Cuban descent. She was born pigeon toed and her mother signed her up for ballet classes when she was very young. Banus became a competitive ballroom dancer.

She was a very energetic child and when she was six years old, her mother looked in the Yellow pages for a talent manager. Banus signed with one and began acting in television commercials.

== Career ==
Banus made her film debut, playing the role of Rainbow in Lenny the Wonder Dog (2005). In 2006, she guest starred on Dexter. In 2007 and 2008, she also made guest appearances on the Spanish language series' Seguro y urgente and Gabriel.

Banus was cast on the ABC soap opera One Life to Live, playing Lola Montez. Her first airdate was October 16, 2008. The character was the daughter of Ray Montez (A Martinez). In April 2009, it was reported that Martinez had decided to leave the show and Banus had been dismissed from her role. Her final airdate was May 15, 2009.

In 2009, Banus co-starred with Amy Smart in See Kate Run, an ABC pilot that didn't go forward. In 2010, she guest starred on the Disney XD series' I'm in the Band and Zeke and Luther.

In August 2010, it was announced that Banus had been cast as Gabi Hernandez on the NBC soap opera Days of Our Lives. The role had previously been played by Gabriella Rodriguez. Banus' first airdate was October 4, 2010.

In 2011, she appeared on the web series ACME Saturday Night. Banus played Talia Portillo in the action film Counterpunch (2013). She announced in August 2013 that she had decided to leave Days of Our Lives to pursue other opportunities. Her last airdate was June 12, 2014. Banus guest starred on Matador in 2014. She played Simone Funicello in the comedy film Wishin' and Hopin'. She returned to Days of Our Lives for a few episodes during the holidays, first airing December 22, 2014.

In 2015, Banus was nominated for a Daytime Emmy Award for Outstanding Younger Actress in a Drama Series for her role on Days of Our Lives. She guest starred on Hawaii Five-0. In August 2015, she announced that she would be returning to Days of Our Lives on a long-term basis. Her first airdate was September 17, 2015. Banus was cast as Lucia Villanuevo in the original pilot for the FX series Snowfall.

In April 2016, Banus landed a recurring role on the ABC series Mistresses. She starred as Nella in the film Speak Now (2016). She also starred in the romantic comedy film Almost Amazing (2017), co-starring with Eric Roberts, and in the film Marigold the Matador.

Banus starred in the Lifetime television film Killer Caregiver (2018). In August 2018, she was cast in a recurring role as Nina Ferrera on the Fox music drama series Star. In 2021, Banus co-starred with Brittany Underwood in the Lifetime television film A Bride's Nightmare (also titled Fatal Fiancé). She starred as Carmen in the Lifetime television film Sweet Navidad (also titled A Christmas & Postre), directed by Brittany Underwood. Banus played Gabi Hernandez in Days of Our Lives: A Very Salem Christmas, a holiday film streaming on Peacock.

In 2022, she played Gabi Hernandez in Days of Our Lives: Beyond Salem, a spinoff miniseries streaming on Peacock. She was cast in the horror film Bad Connection. In April 2023, Banus was also cast in the LGBTQ romance film The Holiday Exchange.

In May 2023, she announced that she would be leaving Days of Our Lives after thirteen years, saying that she was "ready for something different." The character of Gabi was sent to prison for murder and was later recast with Cherie Jimenez. In May 2024, Banus spoke out against her former co-workers on social media, saying "I will never understand all the people at my previous place of employment that are friends with snakes." She also said, "I remember times where everyone just stayed quiet, knowing what was happening was wrong. Men and women."

Banus played Willa in the film Final Heist (2024). In July 2024, she was cast in the film Cake.

== Personal life ==
When she was 15, Banus had cosmetic surgery to have her ears pinned back. She has said that she continued to feel insecure about her ears after the procedure, but she now feels confident about her appearance.

When she was 19 and just starting her work on Days of Our Lives, Banus' father died from suicide. She has said that she buried her grief at the time. Working with the American Foundation for Suicide Prevention helped her heal. She has stated that her father's death made her "a more empathetic person."

She began dating actor Marlon Aquino in 2012. In December 2020, he proposed to her at the Pérez Art Museum Miami. Banus and Aquino were married on August 28, 2021 at The Castle House Estate in Joshua Tree, California.

== Filmography ==
=== Film ===
Year	Title	Role	Notes
2005	Lenny the Wonder Dog	Rainbow	
2013	Counterpunch	Talia Portillo	
2014	Wishin' and Hopin'	Simone Funicello	
2015	Ripples on the Water	Linda	Short film
2016	Speak Now	Nella	Also executive producer
2016	The Broken Camera	Carmen	Short film
2017	Almost Amazing	Taylor	
2023	Marigold the Matador	Marigold (Older)	
2023	Bad Connection	Eva	
2024	Final Heist	Willa	

=== Television ===
Year	Title	Role	Notes
2006	Dexter	Girl Swimming	Episode: "Crocodile"
2007	Seguro y urgente	Tina	Episode: "Cumpleaños feliz"
2008	Gabriel	Vampirita 2008	2 episodes
2008–2009	One Life to Live	Lola Montez	Recurring role, 49 episodes
2009	See Kate Run		Unaired pilot
2010	I'm in the Band	Bianca Ortega	Episode: "Annoying Arlene"
2010	Zeke and Luther	Big Sister	Episode: "Local Heroes"
2010–2023	Days of Our Lives	Gabi Hernandez	Contract role 1,127 episodes
2014	Matador	Pretty Servant Girl No. 2	Episode: "Enter the Worm"
2015	Hawaii Five-0	Tori Onuma	Episode: "Ho'amoano"
2016	Mistresses	Kylie	5 episodes
2017	Snowfall	Lucia Villanuevo	Episode: Original Pilot
2017	The Last Defectors	Isadora	
2018	Rhino	Sophie	Television film
2018	Star	Nina Ferrera	Recurring role, 7 episodes
2018	Killer Caregiver	Tess Harper	Television film
2021	Sweet Navidad	Carmen Tirado	Television film
2021	A Bride's Nightmare	Faith	Television film
2021	Days of Our Lives: A Very Salem Christmas	Gabi Hernandez	Television film
2022	Days of Our Lives: Beyond Salem	Gabi Hernandez	Miniseries, 3 episodes (season 2)
2022	It's Complicated	Mandy	Television film Also associate producer

=== Web series ===
Year	Title	Role	Notes
2011	ACME Saturday Night	Woman in Bed	Episode: "Chandler Massey and Casey Deidrick" Segment: "Waking Up with Brett Sheridan" (Uncredited)

== Awards and nominations ==
List of acting awards and nominations
Year	Award	Category	Title	Result	Ref.
2009	Young Artist Award	Outstanding Young Ensemble in a TV Series (shared with Eddie Alderson, Kristen Alderson, Carmen LoPorto and Austin Williams)	One Life to Live	Nominated	
2015	Daytime Emmy Award	Outstanding Younger Actress in a Drama Series	Days of Our Lives	Nominated	
