= Casey Moss =

American actor and singer

- Born: Casey Allen Moss; Hanford, California, U.S.
- Occupations: Actor; singer
- Years active: 2013–present
- Spouse: True O'Brien (m. 2025)

Casey Allen Moss is an American actor and singer. He is known for playing the role of JJ Deveraux on the NBC soap opera Days of Our Lives.

His portrayal of JJ Deveraux earned him a nomination for the Daytime Emmy Award for Outstanding Younger Actor in a Drama Series in 2018.

== Career ==
Moss began his acting career in 2013 by joining the NBC soap opera, Days of our Lives. Prior to that, in 2012, he had modeled for James Tudor underwear. He is also in a band called "Eyes of One." They released their first EP, "Reconnection," in May 2014. In June 2015, Moss was announced as Jonathan Lipnicki's replacement as Tyler Dean on the teen television series, Youthful Daze. In December 2016, he was cast in the film The Last Champion as Scott Baker. The film was directed by Glenn Withrow.

== Personal life ==
Moss was born in Hanford, California, on November 16, 1993. At the age of 16, he moved to Los Angeles with his father to pursue a career in music. In his spare time, he plays as much music as possible.

He has been dating his former Days of our Lives co-star True O'Brien since 2015. In 2022, the couple announced their engagement. The couple were married on May 25, 2025.

== Filmography ==
Film and television
Year	Title	Role	Notes
2013–2020, 2024	Days of Our Lives	JJ Deveraux	Series regular
2015	Youthful Daze	Tyler Dean	13 episodes
2018	The Last Champion	Scott Baker	Post-production
2019	Circle	Chris Hardy	Post-production

== Nominations ==
Year	Award	Category	Work	Result	Ref.
2018	Daytime Emmy Award	Outstanding Younger Actor in a Drama Series	Days of Our Lives	Nominated	
