= Justin Kiriakis and Adrienne Johnson =

Justin Kiriakis and Adrienne Johnson Kiriakis are fictional characters and a supercouple on the American soap opera Days of Our Lives. Justin is portrayed by Wally Kurth and Adrienne is portrayed by Judi Evans. The couple was popular from 1987 to 1991. After remaining off-screen for more than 15 years, both characters have appeared on the show off and on since 2009.

== Storylines ==
=== 1986-1987 ===
Adrienne Johnson came to Salem in December 1986 in search of her brother Steve Johnson, whom she had never met. She sought his help in getting their mother, Jo, away from their abusive father, Duke. During this turbulent time, Adrienne was attacked and raped by Duke. In her distress, she shot and killed her father, but then couldn't remember what happened due to the trauma. Steve took the blame and was charged with Duke's murder.

In February 1987, Justin Kiriakis, nephew of villain Victor Kirakis, graduated from college in Paris and came to Salem to live with his Uncle Victor. A womanizing playboy, Justin first pursued Melissa Horton, then began an affair with married Anjelica Deveraux. One day, while walking in the park, Justin came across a crying Adrienne, who was upset that she couldn't remember what happened with her father so that she could save Steve from going to jail. Justin offered comfort, and later ran into Adrienne at the park two more times. The third time, while talking to Justin, Adrienne got her memory back about the night she killed her father. She hurried away to save Steve from being sent to jail.

Justin and Adrienne, who hadn't even learned each other's names in their previous encounters, ran into each other again at the Emergency Center where Adrienne was a receptionist. Justin was accompanying an injured construction worker who was on a job for Kiriakis-Deveraux, the construction company Justin ran with Anjelica. Justin asked Adrienne on a date and wouldn't take no for an answer despite her acute shyness. When he realized she only felt comfortable with him because she thought he was a poor construction worker, he began a charade and went all out to keep her from figuring out that he was a Kiriakis.

When Adrienne finally learned the truth, she was furious at Justin's deception and felt they had nothing in common - he was rich, she was poor. She refused to see Justin again until she needed his help to find Steve and Kayla who had gone on the run after Steve was accused of trying to kill Harper Deveraux. Justin accompanied Adrienne to Colorado to find Steve and Kayla, and she began to trust him again, enough to tell him what her father did to her. When they returned to Salem, Justin and Adrienne began going on dates again.

Anjelica, who Justin had broken up with shortly after he met Adrienne, was very unhappy to see Justin moving on with the maid's daughter. She began doing everything she could to sabotage their relationship, eventually setting it up for Adrienne to find Justin in Anjelica's hotel room and assume he was having sex with her. Justin admitted to Adrienne that he had previously had a relationship with Anjelica, but insisted it had been over for a long time. Adrienne eventually believed him, and the two tried to resume their relationship. Victor interfered after deciding that Adrienne's past and family would ruin Justin's future. Victor offered Adrienne $10,000 to stay away from Justin forever. An emergency orchestrated by Anjelica forced Adrienne to spend the money, and she tried to end things with Justin for good. Justin declared his love for Adrienne, but she insisted they couldn't be together.

Just as Justin was about to give up and leave for an indefinite business trip in Greece, Adrienne realized she didn't want to be without him and ran to the airport to stop him from leaving town. The two shared their first kiss, and Justin decided to stay. The relationship escalated quickly, and Justin proposed on a trip to Montreal. Adrienne accepted, despite her brother's warnings that the Kiriakis family was dangerous.

The two were married in Greece, with Steve giving Adrienne away. Adrienne and Justin had sex for the first time on their wedding night, as Adrienne had not been ready before due to the trauma suffered at the hands of her father.

=== 1988-1991 ===
After their wedding, Adrienne became pregnant, and then quickly learned the truth about how dangerous Victor Kirakis' business could be. She considered getting an abortion, but changed her mind at the last minute. After a brief separation due to strife over the Kiriakis business and Justin believing Adrienne had gotten an abortion, the two reunited and moved out of the Kiriakis mansion into a small apartment. Justin tried to get a new job but had trouble finding decent work. Adrienne had problems with her pregnancy and eventually miscarried.

After Victor was shot trying to protect Justin, Justin insisted he needed to help his uncle and go back to the family business to make it right. Horrified that Justin might become like Victor, Adrienne refused to go with Justin, and the two separated. After Adrienne told Justin that they were over for good, Justin got drunk and had sex with Anjelica. Due to this encounter, Anjelica became pregnant with Justin's son, Alexander, something that would remain a secret for almost a year. Justin and Adrienne once again reunited, and Adrienne agreed to return to the Kiriakis mansion with Justin. They started trying to get pregnant again, but Adrienne had many health issues that prevented this from happening.

A new gardener named Emilio Ramirez, who Adrienne had previously met and used to try and make Justin jealous, started working at the Kiriakis mansion. Adrienne befriended him and offered to teach him how to read. Justin grew distant with family business, and then Victor brought family friend Kristina to town to try and break up Adrienne and Justin. Justin did not give in to Kristina, but Adrienne grew closer to Emilio and eventually had sex with him. Once Justin found out about Adrienne's infidelity, he rigged the Curtis stable roof to fall on Emilio. When he heard that Adrienne had gone to the stables, he ran to stop her, and the roof fell on both of them. Adrienne was okay, but Justin was left unable to walk. Adrienne pledged her devotion to him, but Justin tried to push her away, not feeling good enough for her.

Justin eventually was able to walk again, but the two broke up once again when Adrienne found out Justin had tried to kill Emilio. Emilio then tried to kill Justin by cutting the brakes in his car, but in the same way Justin was caught in his own trap, Emilio jumped in front of the car because his love interest Jennifer Horton had asked Justin for a ride. Adrienne and Justin reunited, and again left the Kiriakis mansion after Justin discovered Victor had been giving him pills to cause impotence in order to try and break up Justin's marriage. Then, finally, Anjelica revealed that Justin was her baby's father. Adrienne and Justin tried to stay together through this, but the turmoil caused by a conniving Anjelica was almost too much to stand. As a last-ditch effort to trump Anjelica once and for all, Adrienne pretended to be pregnant. When Justin found out about the deception, he filed for divorce.

After the breakup of her marriage, Adrienne bought a rival construction company to go up against Kiriakis-Deveraux. Now estranged spouses and business rivals, Justin and Adrienne kept an adversarial relationship but still secretly loved each other. After their divorce was finalized, the two became friends again and even started to go on dates. Anjelica sabotaged a building that Adrienne's company was working on, and Adrienne and Justin were caught in the building when it collapsed. In the rubble, the two declared their love and Justin asked Adrienne to marry him again, using a discarded washer as a makeshift engagement ring. Worried she would be charged for the building's collapse, which had also killed the foreman at Adrienne's company, Anjelica planned to flee the country with Alexander. They never got on the plane, but when it crashed, killing everyone on board, Anjelica used that cover to skip town.

Adrienne helped Justin deal with the "death" of Alexander, and the two remarried. Having formed their own company, AJ Construction, Adrienne and Justin returned from a prolonged honeymoon in Tahiti to work with Jencon, a controversial oil company in Salem. Alexander's former nanny, JJ, became pregnant with twins, and asked Justin and Adrienne to adopt them. Though there were some delays and questions about whether JJ or the babies' father would end up keeping the children, Justin and Adrienne adopted the babies and named them Victor and Joey. After much trying, shortly after the adoption of the twins, Adrienne found out she was finally pregnant again.

With the downfall of Jencon, Justin began looking for another job, and found an opportunity in Dallas. He and Adrienne decided to make a new life there. Before they left, Anjelica, who had been keeping tabs on the couple from afar, decided to send Alexander back to Salem, believing Adrienne and Justin would do a better job raising him. So with Alexander, Victor, Joey, and Adrienne pregnant with a fourth son, the couple left Salem vowing that one day they would be back.

=== 2009-2019 ===
After a brief appearance by Adrienne in 2007, where she said she and Justin were still happy together, Justin returned to Salem solo in 2009, now a lawyer. Separated from Adrienne, Justin took an interest in Hope. Adrienne soon returned to Salem as well, and the two were eventually divorced. After a period of time, they reconciled, Justin proposed, and they went to Las Vegas to get married for a third time.

The couple's fourth son, Jackson "Sonny" Kiriakis came to Salem, openly gay and completely accepted by his parents. Adrienne objected to Sonny's romance with Will Horton, but ultimately Adrienne and Justin supported Sonny when he and Will got married.

In 2015, it was revealed that Justin had had an affair with a coworker named Elsa in Dubai. Adrienne began an affair with Lucas Horton, and she and Justin divorced for a third time. In 2016, Adrienne was set to marry Lucas when Justin interrupted the wedding, declaring that he still loved her. Adrienne found herself torn between two men that she loved, forced to make a decision. Before she could decide between them, Adrienne discovered she had breast cancer. During her treatment, both Lucas and Justin cared for her. After her cancer battle was over, Adrienne chose to stay with Lucas.

Anjelica, still bitter that Adrienne had raised Alexander with Justin, returned to town set on stealing The Spectator from Adrienne and Jennifer Horton. Justin secretly swooped in to save the paper from being bought out by Anjelica at the last minute. Anjelica then recruited Bonnie Lockhart, Adrienne's doppelganger, to steal Adrienne's life. Anjelica drugged Adrienne, and then, with help from Hattie Adams, had her placed in prison, where everyone thought she was Bonnie. Bonnie then took over Adrienne's life in Salem, dumping Lucas and asking Justin to reconcile with her as "Adrienne." Bonnie planned to blackmail Victor into marrying her as revenge for her long-ago feud with Maggie. Steve and Kayla figured out the ruse and rushed in just as Justin and Maggie broke up Bonnie and Victor's fake wedding. Justin, Steve, and Kayla rushed to prison to retrieve Adrienne. Upon seeing Justin, Adrienne kissed him. Adrienne revealed to Lucas all that had happened with Bonnie, but they broke up for real because she admitted she still loved Justin. Adrienne and Justin reconciled, and she moved back into the Kiriakis mansion with him. In 2019, during the first ever in daytime television time warp event, it was revealed that Adrienne had been killed in a car accident and that her organs were donated.

== Casting and characterization ==
Though both Evans and Kurth joined Days of our Lives around the same time period, the character of Justin was most likely not originally intended to be paired with Evans' Adrienne. "It was very unexpected for me," Evans said. "I think originally Wally was brought on for Melissa Horton." Kurth also noted: "When I first went on the show, I don’t think we were intended for each other. But then they went for that rich boy falling for the girl from the other side of the tracks."

Executive Producer Al Rabin instructed Kurth to portray Justin as falling in love with Adrienne at first sight. "When Al Rabin, the executive producer, said to me, 'Wally, when you see her, you fall in love with her; she is the love of your life,' I took him at his word," Kurth said. "I remember this scene where she was really devastated. She was recoiling from this incredible emotional experience she had with her father, who I think attacked her. She was very upset, sitting in the park. I saw her and I walked up to her and handed her a handkerchief. From then on, I just played this, 'No matter what, I love you.' That was it. Our love was going to get through anything, and that’s how we played it."

== See also ==
- List of supercouples
