= Finding Bliss =

- Theatrical poster
- Directed by: Julie Davis
- Written by: Julie Davis
- Starring: Leelee Sobieski; Kristen Johnston; Matthew Davis; Mircea Monroe; Denise Richards; Jamie Kennedy
- Cinematography: Peter N. Green
- Music by: John Swihart; Kevin Roentgen
- Release dates: January 18, 2009 (Slamdance); June 4, 2010 (United States)
- Running time: 96 minutes
- Country: United States
- Language: English
- Budget: $1.2 million

Finding Bliss is a 2009 romantic comedy film written and directed by filmmaker Julie Davis (Amy's Orgasm). Finding Bliss explores the pornographic film industry through the eyes of an idealistic 24-year-old film school grad, Jody Balaban (played by Leelee Sobieski).

== Plot ==
After a long humbling year temping as a traffic cop on a studio lot, Jody is faced with the hard decision of taking the only well-paying industry job she has yet been offered — editing porn at Grind Productions, a profitable adult film company run by former porn star Irene Fox (Kristen Johnston).

At first horrified by the prospect of exposing herself to the cockroaches of the film industry, not to mention the effect it would have on her strict Jewish parents, Jody has a remarkable change of heart when she realizes that Grind has all the facilities she needs to make her own low budget movie — on the sly of course — but things get complicated when Jody meets Jeff Drake (Matthew Davis), the charming Herr Director of adult films. Jeff, also an award-winning filmmaker, once had his own dreams of making "real" films, but now is a hard-worn cynic who masks his disappointment behind a façade of irony. In Jody, he sees the idealism he once had, while Jody starts to face her own sexual hang-ups as she begins to get aroused by the porn she so harshly judges. Jody and Jeff get close to each other, but she gets hurt when she sees him making out with one of his actresses, Sindi, who was actually taking advantage of Jeff in his drunken state. The movie made by Jody is well received by critics, and Jeff is also nominated for an AVN Award for his movie. Jody wants to set things right with him; she accepts help from Bliss, the lead actress in both Jody's and Jeff's movies, but with different identities, and pretends to be her to gain entry at an award function. On stage, when Jeff receives his award, he announces his retirement from the Adult Industry to move on. Jeff calls Bliss for special thanks. He realizes that Jody is in disguise as Bliss, and they kiss.

== Cast ==
- Leelee Sobieski as Jody Balaban
  - Sammi Hanratty as Young Jody Balaban
- Matthew Davis as Jeff Drake
- Denise Richards as Laura / Bliss
- Mircea Monroe as Sindi
- Jamie Kennedy as Richard "Dick" Harder
- Kristen Johnston as Irene
- P. J. Byrne as Gary
- Caroline Aaron as Debra Balaban
- Tim Bagley as Alan Balaban
- Christa Campbell as Kato
- Mr. Marcus as Jake B. Bigg
- Donnamarie Recco as Kathleen
- Stormy Daniels as Porn Starlet
- Garry Marshall as Himself
- Ron Jeremy as Himself
- Zach Cumer as Bobby Daples
- Mario Cassem as Morris Goldstein
- Dan Taylor as Cute Guy
- Julie Davis as Dyan Cannons
- G.K. Bowes as Additional Voices (uncredited)

== Release ==
The film was released theatrically in the U.S. on June 4, 2010 in New York City and June 11, 2010 in Los Angeles.

== Reception ==
The film was well-received upon its premiere at the 2009 Slamdance Film Festival. Despite that, it received generally negative reviews from critics. On Rotten Tomatoes it has a rating of 30% based on reviews from 20 critics, with an average rating of 3.8/10. On Metacritic the film has a score of 30 out of 100 based on 10 reviews, indicating "generally unfavorable" reviews.
