= Adrienne Johnson Kiriakis =

Fictional character

- Days of our Lives character
- Judi Evans as Adrienne Johnson Kiriakis
- Portrayed by: Denise Wanner (1986); Judi Evans (1986–2025); Alison Sweeney (1987; flashbacks)
- Duration: 1986–1991; 2007–2008; 2010–2020; 2025
- First appearance: November 7, 1986
- Last appearance: June 16, 2025
- Created by: Leah Laiman
- Introduced by: Betty Corday, Ken Corday and Al Rabin
In-universe information
- Other names: Adrienne Josephine Johnson
- Occupation: Newspaper magnate Businesswoman; Bar owner
- Parents: Duke Johnson; Jo Johnson
- Brothers: Steve Johnson; Jack Deveraux
- Spouse: Justin Kiriakis (1987–2015, 2019) (Note: The first ceremony for Justin and Adrienne was on November 16, 1987. They divorced for the first time on March 6, 1990. The second marriage between them took place three months later on June 26, 1990, until their divorce in 2010. The couple remarried in 2011 and divorced again in 2015. However, they were married consecutively from 1987 to 2015.)
- Sons: Sonny Kiriakis
- Adoptive sons: Joseph Kiriakis; Victor Kiriakis II
- Stepsons: Alexander Kiriakis
- Grandchildren: Arianna Horton
- Uncles: Earl Johnson
- Nieces and nephews: Stephanie Johnson; Joey Johnson; Abigail Deveraux; JJ Deveraux; Tripp Dalton; Gwen Rizczech

Adrienne Johnson Kiriakis is a fictional character on NBC's daytime drama Days of Our Lives. She had been portrayed by actress Denise Wanner from November to December 1986 before Judi Evans took over the role from December 1986 to February 1991, from May 2007 to January 2008, and from March 2010 to January 2020. She reprised the role in June 2025 when Adrienne appeared before Steve Johnson (Stephen Nichols).

== Casting and characterization ==
The role was initially played by Denise Wanner, as a mysterious character whose face wasn't shown until Judi Evans debuted in the role on December 26 of that year after a widely popular run on the CBS soap opera Guiding Light, where she played Beth Raines from 1983 to 1986. Her run on the NBC soap opera centered on her battles with childhood abuse and her relationship with Justin Kiriakis, played by Wally Kurth. After she left the show in 1991, she joined Another World that year as Paulina Cory Carlino until the show ended in 1999. After a short break from daytime, she returned to DAYS in 2003 as an entirely different character, Bonnie Lockhart and remained in the role until 2007 when she was immediately brought back as Adrienne from 2007 to 2008 and then since 2010. In between her second and third runs on DAYS, Evans joined the cast of the CBS soap opera As the World Turns as Maeve Stone in 2009. The role lasted for several months and followed her almost-relationship with Holden Snyder, played by Jon Hensley. Evans' casting on ATWT coincided with Kurth's return to DAYS, ending plans for a Justin and Adrienne reunion but she eventually returned a year later.

At the time of her 2010 return, Evans spoke to the Sony Pictures Days of our Lives website about her character's onscreen reunion with Justin and their struggling marriage.

"...The way they wrote the characters...they really matured them, they really caught the gist of what their relationship had been as opposed to what it is now. Wally and I kept marveling at how wonderful the writing is. And true to form, true to life, true to the characters."

—Judi Evans, Sony Pictures/Days of our Lives

In February 2015, nearly five years since her return Evans has been upgraded to contract status alongside Wally Kurth and Mary Beth Evans.

In December 2015, Evans and Kurth were downgraded back to recurring status. Evans exited the role on January 24, 2020.

== Storylines ==
=== 1986–1991 ===
Adrienne Johnson, an abused teenager runs away to Salem, where she becomes friends, and moves in with Kayla Brady. At that time Kayla is falling in love with Adrienne's oldest brother Steven Earl "Patch" Johnson. Their abusive father Duke comes to Salem in search of his daughter. He beats and rapes Adrienne when he finds her alone. After the attack she finds a gun, and shoots him. Steve takes the blame and goes on trial for his murder. Adrienne confesses to the crime but after explaining everything does not go to jail. After the murder trial she meets Justin Kiriakis. In 1987 they marry in Greece. Adrienne doesn't like Justin's ties to his uncle Victor Kiriakis' business and makes him choose between her and his work. He ultimately chose her, and they move out. It is however short lived when Victor Kiriakis is shot, Justin returns, without Adrienne. Justin & Adrienne are having trouble conceiving, so when their housekeeper JJ Bagwood gets pregnant she offers them her twins. After a custody battle with the father, Stanley, they receive custody. Later Adrienne becomes pregnant with a baby of her own, Jackson. Before leaving town Justin, Adrienne, and Victor all reconcile. The family is offscreen throughout the nineties. They do not appear for Adrienne's younger brother Jack Deveraux's funeral in 2003 (years later, Jack is discovered alive), however Adrienne makes a call to his wife Jennifer Horton Devereaux offering her condolences.

=== 2007–2025 ===
Adrienne returns home in 2007 at her sister-in-law Kayla's request to help Adrienne's amnesiac brother Steve. After accomplishing her goal, she, Justin, and the kids leave Salem again for Dubai. In March 2010, Adrienne comes back to Salem and is engulfed in a struggling marriage with Justin, who has feelings for Hope Williams Brady. Hope doesn't return the feelings and pressures the couple to reunite. Adrienne and Justin divorce but the couple find their way back to one another and remarry. The couple soon welcome their son Sonny Kiriakis back to town and it is revealed that he is gay. They support him as he comes out to his uncle Victor and as he makes a home for himself with his new life. After remarrying Justin, Adrienne is killed when she is involved in a car accident caused by supervillain Orpheus.

In June 2025, Adrienne appears in Steve's dream to reassure him John is being well cared for.

== Reception ==
In 2020, Charlie Mason from Soaps She Knows placed Adrienne 35th on his list of the 35 most memorable characters from Days of Our Lives, saying that "The bigger the heart, the more painful the breaks — so Judi Evans' down-to-earth angel taught us. Thankfully, when she was killed off, she left behind brassy lookalike Bonnie Lockhart to leaven our grief."

== See also ==
- Justin Kiriakis and Adrienne Johnson
