= Mitchell Whitfield =

American actor (born 1964)

- Born: September 8, 1964 (age 61); Brooklyn, New York, U.S.
- Occupation: Actor
- Years active: 1983–present
- Children: 2

Mitchell Whitfield (born September 8, 1964) is an American actor. He is best known for his roles as Barry Farber in Friends (1994–2000), Dr. Bruce Hampton in Minor Adjustments (1995–1996), and Stan Rothenstein in My Cousin Vinny (1992). He is also known for voice roles including Donatello in the 2007 film TMNT, Prince Phobos in W.I.T.C.H., and Fixit in Transformers: Robots in Disguise.

== Life and career ==
Whitfield was born to a Jewish family in Brooklyn, New York. In the 1992 film My Cousin Vinny, Whitfield starred as Stan Rothenstein.

He guest-starred in several episodes of Friends as Barry Farber, Rachel Green's ex-fiancé, whom Rachel left at the altar on their wedding day. He portrayed Dr. Bruce Hampton in Minor Adjustments which ran for one season. He also appeared in Dharma & Greg, Murder, She Wrote, Diagnosis Murder, CSI: Crime Scene Investigation, and Curb Your Enthusiasm. He also appeared in an episode of The Suite Life of Zack & Cody.

As a voice actor, Whitfield voiced Donatello in the 2007 film TMNT, Phobos in W.I.T.C.H., and Fixit in Transformers: Robots in Disguise.

In Dogfight, he played Benjamin.

== Filmography ==
=== Film ===
Year	Title	Role	Notes
1983	The First Turn-On!	Bedwet Micky	
1990	Reversal of Fortune	Curly	
1991	Dogfight	Benjamin	
1992	My Cousin Vinny	Stan Rothenstein	
1996	Sgt. Bilko	Pfc. Mickey Zimmerman	
1997	I Love You, Don't Touch Me!	Ben	
1997	A Match Made in Heaven	Gordon Rosner	Television film
1997	Best Men	Sol Jacobs	
1997	The Fanatics	Benny Pinser	
1997	Critics and Other Freaks	Casting Agent	
1999	Lost & Found	Mark Gildewell	
1999	Seal with a Kiss	Larry	Television film
2000	Files on Cupid	Steven Hayes	
2001	Amy's Orgasm	Don	
2007	The Memory Thief	Tom	
2007	TMNT	Donatello (voice)	
2010	Dylan Dog: Dead of Night	Cecil	
2011	Green Lantern: Emerald Knights	Avra (voice)	Direct-to-video

=== Television ===
Year	Title	Role	Notes
1992	Murder, She Wrote	Teddy Cardoza	Episode: "Ever After"
1993	Blossom	Larry Levin	Episode: "Sitcom"
1994	The Angry Beavers	Norbert Beaver (voice)	Pilot episode
1994	The George Carlin Show	Brian	Episode: "George Helps Sydney"
1994–1995	Diagnosis: Murder	Eddie Clark, Arnold Baskin	2 episodes
1994–2000	Friends	Barry Farber	6 episodes
1995	Double Rush	Michael	Episode: "Love Letters"
1995–1996	Minor Adjustments	Bruce Hampton	20 episodes
1997	Perversions of Science	Matt Solomon	Episode: "Ultimate Weapon"
1997	Head over Heels	Warren Baldwin	7 episodes
2000	Family Law	Ian Packard	Episode: "Media Relations"
2000	Dharma & Greg	Bob	Episode: "Boxing Dharma"
2000	Buzz Lightyear of Star Command	Norbert Klerm (voice)	2 episodes
2001	CSI: Crime Scene Investigation	Cameron Nelson	Episode: "Slaves of Las Vegas"
2001	Curb Your Enthusiasm	Becky's Fiancé	Episode: "The Baptism"
2004–2006	W.I.T.C.H.	Phobos, Sandpit (voice)	Recurring role
2006	Hellboy: Sword of Storms	Russell Thorn (voice)	Television film
2007	The Suite Life of Zack & Cody	Mr. Blaine	Episode: "Lip Synchin' in the Rain"
2011–2014	Winx Club	Professor Palladium (voice)	Recurring role
2014–2016	Doc McStuffins	Oooey Gablooey (voice)	6 episodes
2014	The Legend of Korra	Gun, various voices	4 episodes
2014–2017	Sofia the First	Boo, Greylock (voice)	3 episodes
2014–2017	Transformers: Robots in Disguise	Fixit (voice)	Main cast
2015–2018	Goldie & Bear	Humpty Dumpty, Demi, Woodsman (voice)	21 episodes
2017–2021	Vampirina	Demi (voice)	Main cast
2017	Jeff & Some Aliens	Race Track Announcer (voice)	Episode: "Jeff & Some Laughs"
2025–present	RoboGobo	Gimme Pig (voice)	Recurring role

=== Video games ===
Year	Title	Role	Notes
2007	TMNT	Donatello	
2014	Skylanders: Trap Team	Bruiser Cruiser	
2015	Lego Jurassic World	Donald Gennaro	
