= Down, Out & Dangerous =

- Directed by: Noel Nosseck
- Written by: Carey Hayes; Chad Hayes
- Produced by: Jack Roe
- Starring: Richard Thomas; Bruce Davison; Cynthia Ettinger
- Cinematography: Paul Maibaum
- Edited by: Cari Coughlin
- Music by: Mark Snow
- Production company: Wilshire Court Productions
- Release date: August 23, 1995
- Running time: 91 minutes
- Country: USA
- Language: English

Down, Out & Dangerous is a 1995 made for TV thriller film directed by Noel Nosseck starring Richard Thomas and Bruce Davison. The film aired August 22, 1995, on Lifetime and August 23, 1995, on USA Network.

== Plot ==
A father to be makes the mistake of helping a homeless drifter who turns out to be an escaped murderer.

== Cast ==
- Richard Thomas as Tim Willows
- Bruce Davison as Brad Harrington
- Cynthia Ettinger as Monica Harrington
- Steve Hytner as Grant Cromwell
- Jason Bernard as Detective Danner
- George DiCenzo as Lance Fredricks
- Christine Cavanaugh as Leslie McCoy
- Melinda Culea as CeCe Dryer
