= Vampirina =

Children's television series from Disney Junior

- Genre: Preschool; Comedy horror Adventure; Musical
- Created by: Chris Nee
- Based on: Vampirina Ballerina by Anne Marie Pace
- Developed by: Chris Nee; Jeny Quine
- Voices of: Isabella Crovetti; Lauren Graham; James Van Der Beek; Mitchell Whitfield; Wanda Sykes; Jordan Alexa Davis; ViviAnn Yee; Benji Risley
- Opening theme: "Vampirina" theme by Isabella Crovetti, Lauren Graham, and James Van Der Beek
- Ending theme: "Vampirina" theme (instrumental)
- Composers: Layla Minoui; Jérôme Leroy (S3)
- Countries of origin: United States; Ireland
- No. of seasons: 3
- No. of episodes: 75 (147 segments) (list of episodes)

Production
- Executive producers: Chris Nee (S1–2); Cathal Gaffney; Darragh O'Connell; Chelsea Beyl (S3)
- Producers: Erik Vignau (S1); Lisa O'Connor (S2–3); Nayanshi Shaw (S3)
- Running time: 24 minutes (2x 12-minute segments)
- Production company: Brown Bag Films

Original release
- Network: Disney Junior; Disney Channel
- Release: October 1, 2017 – June 28, 2021

Related
- Vampirina: Teenage Vampire

Vampirina is an animated children's television series created by Chris Nee. Based on the Vampirina Ballerina series of books written by Anne Marie Pace and published by Disney-Hyperion, the series premiered on Disney Junior and Disney Channel on October 1, 2017. It features much of the staff that has worked on another program created by Nee, Doc McStuffins. Vampirina received generally positive reviews from critics.

The series ended on June 28, 2021, after 3 seasons and 75 episodes.

== Premise ==
Vampirina follows the story of Vampirina "Vee" Hauntley who becomes the new kid on the block after she and her family move from Transylvania to Pennsylvania to open a local bed and breakfast called the Scare B&B for visiting ghouls (including vampires) and goblins. The Hauntley family have to learn to do things the "Pennsylvania way", especially when Vee is at school, all while keeping their monster lives a secret from humans so they don't scare them.

== Characters ==
=== Main ===
- Vampirina "Vee" Hauntley (voiced by Isabella Crovetti) is a physically 10-year-old (6 in season 1a, 7 in season 1b, 8 in Season 2a, and 9 in Season 2b), but chronologically near-200-years-old (as stated in "Countless Vee") vampire. Unlike in the books, in the TV adaptation she and her family have blue skin and super-speed. She is the lead singer and spookylele player of her band, the Ghoul Girls.
- Oxana Hauntley and Boris Hauntley (voiced by Lauren Graham and James Van Der Beek respectively) are Vee's parents who are the proprietors of the Scare B&B. Both speak with a Transylvanian accent.
- Demi Hauntley (voiced by Mitchell Whitfield) is a blue ghost who lives with the Hauntleys.
- Gregoria (voiced by Wanda Sykes) is a 473-year-old gargoyle who lives with the Hauntleys.
- Poppy Peepleson (voiced by Jordan Alexa Davis) is Edgar's sister and Edna's daughter who is Vee's best friend and neighbor. She is the first human who discovers Vee's true identity, but promises not to tell anyone. She's the drummer and the youngest of the Ghoul Girls. She is 8 years old. In "Double Double Halloween Trouble", she and her family are revealed to be Hispanic. Her first name is probably chosen as a reference to Gothic author Billy Martin's pen name Poppy Z. Brite (cf. her brother's first name being that of Edgar Allan Poe).
- Bridget (voiced by ViviAnn Yee) is a very shy and nervous girl who is one of Vee's best friends. She also soon discovers Vee's identity, and like Poppy, promises to keep it secret. She has a pet Sphynx cat named Miss Cuddlecakes. She's the bassist and the smartest of the Ghoul Girls. She is also 9 years old. She is revealed to be partly Jewish in "Double Double Halloween Trouble".
- Edgar Peepleson (voiced by Benji Risley) is Poppy's younger twin brother and Edna's son who is Vee's friend. He is a monster enthusiast and runs a vlog called "Weekly Weirdness". In the Season 2 finale episode "Ghoul Guides Save the Day!", he finally learns Vee's secret of her family being vampires, and the fact that monsters are actually real when he visits Vee's home town, Transylvania for the first time. However, just like Poppy and Bridget, he promises not to tell anyone. He is the percussionist and twin member of the Ghoul Girls. He is 8 years old. Similarly to his sister, Edgar's first name is probably chosen as a reference to a Gothic author - namely Edgar Allan Poe.

=== Supporting ===
- Wolfie Hauntley (vocal effects provided by Dee Bradley Baker) is a purple dog who is the Hauntley's house pet. He can assume a werewolf-like form during a full moon or by drinking milk.
- Penelope is a plant monster who is the Hauntley's house pet.
- Chef Remy Bones (voiced by Ian James Corlett) is a skeleton who is the head chef of the Scare B&B. He speaks with a French accent.
- Edna Peepleson (voiced by Cree Summer) is Poppy and Edgar's mom and the next door neighbor of the Hauntleys. She is very excitable, motherly, and supportive, but often gets creeped out by the spooky stuffs in Vampirina‘s home.

=== Recurring ===
- Nanpire and Grandpop (voiced by Patti LuPone and Brian Stokes Mitchell respectively) are Vee's paternal grandparents. Both speak with a Transylvanian accent.
- Mr. Gore (voiced by Dee Bradley Baker) is Vee's human school teacher. His surname is inspired by the horror genre of the same name.

=== Guests ===
- Cosmina and Narcissa (voiced by Alex Ellis and Laraine Newman respectively) are two 800-year old internet-using vampire sisters who were guests at the Scare B&B.
- King Pepi (voiced by Andrew Rannells) is a mummy from Egypt.
- Uncle Dieter (voiced by Henry Winkler) is the ancestor who left the house to Vampirina's family.
- Nosferatu "Nosy" (voiced by Kari Wahlgren) is Olga's baby daughter, Vampirina's baby cousin, and Oxana's and Boris' baby niece.
- Aunt Olga (voiced by Kari Wahlgren) is Vampirina's aunt, Nosy's mother, Oxana's sister and Boris' sister-in-law.
- Matilda (voiced by Lara Jill Miller) is a cuddly Snugglot monster.
- Mr. Froufington (voiced by Phil LaMarr) is a human foodie who visits the Scare B&B to try Oxana's food.
- Phoebe (voiced by Sanai Victoria) is a little witch who first appears in "The Little Witch".
- The Scream Girls are Vee's favorite ghoulish rock band.
  - FrankenStacey (voiced by Kaley Snider) is a Frankenstein monster who is the lead singer and guitarist of The Scream Girls.
  - Creepy Caroline (voiced by Raini Rodriguez) is a Gorgon minus the petrifying gaze and guitarist of The Scream Girls
  - Ghastly Gayle (voiced by Gabriela Milo) is an unspecified humanoid monster and drummer of The Scream Girls
- Buttons (voiced by Nika Futterman) is a blue Cuddle Monster.
- Hornadette and Shriekia (voiced by Georgie Kidder and Debi Derryberry respectively) are a two-headed monster whose two heads are sisters.
- Rusty Topsail (voiced by Christian Borle) is a ghost pirate.
- Bob Bigfoot (voiced by Ethan Suplee) is an old friend of Boris who is often called "Uncle Bob" by Vee.
- Poltergeist Pat (voiced by Adam DeVine) is an arrogant entertainer who cheats in order to win a talent show.
- Frankenstein (voiced by Skylar Astin) is an old friend of Boris who tends to forget things.
- Bride of Frankenstein (voiced by Anna Camp) is the girlfriend of Frankenstein who gets engaged to him.
- Esmeralda (voiced by Rachel Bloom) is a human psychic.
- Hugo (voiced by Imari Williams) is a gargoyle and Gregoria's brother.
- Ichabod Crane (voiced by Taran Killam) is a ghost who starts off disliking the Horseman before becoming friends.
- Headless Horseman (voiced by Christopher Jackson) is a ghost who starts off disliking Ichabod before becoming friends.
- Franken Bolt (voiced by T. J. Holmes) is a Frankenstein monster and a reporter for Transylvania News Network (or TNN for short).
- Frankie Bolt (voiced by Marsai Martin) is a teenage Frankenstein monster and the daughter of Franken Bolt who is one of Vee's oldest friends and an aspiring reporter.
- Swampy (voiced by Lily Sanfelippo) is a swamp monster who is Vampirina's friend from Transylvania, she appears in "Making a Splash".

== Episodes ==
Season	Segments	Episodes	Originally released	
Season	Segments	Episodes	First released	Last released
1	49	25	October 1, 2017	November 23, 2018
2	49	25	December 7, 2018	April 10, 2020
3	49	25	October 5, 2020	June 28, 2021

== Release ==
=== Broadcast ===
Vampirina premiered on Sunday, October 1, 2017 in the United States with two back-to-back episodes simulcast on Disney Channel and Disney Junior. Of the first season's 15 episodes, 10 premiered within the month of October to tie into Halloween and were also placed on Disney Junior's streaming and video on demand venues. In Canada, the show premiered on Disney Junior on October 7 the same year. The second season premiered on December 7, 2018, while the third season premiered on October 5, 2020. Vampirina is broadcast in 115 countries and translated into 15 languages. The series ended with its series finale on June 28, 2021 after 3 seasons and 75 episodes.

=== Home media ===
DVD releases
Region	Set title	Seasons	Aspect ratio	Episode count	Time length	Release date
1	Vampirina: Volume 1: Meet The New Girl On The Block!	1	1.78:1	4 (half-hours)	92 minutes	Oct 17, 2017
1	Vampirina: Ghoul Girls Rock!	1	1.78:1	6 (half-hours)	144 minutes	Nov 6, 2018
1	Disney Junior Holiday	1	1.78:1	2 (half-hours)	143 minutes	Oct 23, 2018

The series was also included to stream on Disney+.

== Reception ==
=== Critical response ===
Emily Ashby of Common Sense Media gave Vampirina a grade of four out of five stars, praised the presence of positive messages and role models, citing friendship and honesty, writing that "vivacious vampire girl's adventures promote tolerance". Dave Trumbore of Collider included Vampirina in their "Best Animated Series Debuts of 2017" list, saying that the show is "a super-cute take on The Munsters or The Addams Family with a bit of the "new kid in school" thrown in for good measure".

Charles Curtis of USA Today ranked Vampirina 5th in their "20 Best Shows For Kids Right Now (March 2020)" list, calling it a "delight with some great celebrity voices". Ryan Britt of Fatherly ranked Vampirina 87th in their "100 Best Kids TV Shows Of All Time" list: "For kids who are having a hard time feeling seen at school, or for anyone feeling left out, Vampirina is both sweet and smarter than its saccharine appearance".

=== Accolades ===
Year	Award	Category	Nominee(s)	Result	Ref.
2018	Daytime Emmy Awards	Outstanding Directing in an Animated Program	Nicky Phelan, Marten Jonmark, Ehud Landsberg, Matteo Ceccotti and Kristi Reed	Nominated	
2018	Daytime Emmy Awards	Outstanding Main Title and Graphic Design	Nicky Phelan, Stephen Robinson, Leigh Fieldhouse and Magnus Kråvik	Nominated	
2018	Daytime Emmy Awards	Outstanding Writing in an Animated Preschool Program	Chris Nee, Chelsea Beyl, Travis Braun and Jeffrey King	Nominated	
2018	British Academy Children's Awards	International Pre-School	Chris Nee, Norton Virgien, Nicky Phelan	Nominated	
2018	Irish Film and Television Awards	Best Animation - Television	Chris Nee, Erik Vignau, Lisa O'Connor	Nominated	
2019	Daytime Emmy Awards	Outstanding Sound Mixing for a Preschool Animated Program	Jay Culliton, Carlos Sanches and Eric Lewis	Nominated	
2019	Daytime Emmy Awards	Outstanding Sound Editing for a Preschool Animated Program	Otis Van Osten, Marcos Abrom, Jason Oliver, Eric Lewis, Goeun Lee	Won	
2020	Daytime Emmy Awards	Outstanding Preschool Children's Animated Series	Chris Nee, Cathal Gaffney, Darragh O'Connell, Norton Virgien, Chelsea Beyl, Gillian Higgins, Colm Tyrrell, Lisa O'Connor, Erik Vignau, Nayanshi Shaw and Jeffrey King	Nominated	
2020	Daytime Emmy Awards	Outstanding Original Song in a Children's, Young Adult or Animated Program	Michael Kooman, Christopher Dimond and Chris Nee for The Vamp-Opera: "The Vamp Opera"	Nominated	

== Live-action series ==
On November 1, 2024, Disney Channel announced a new Vampirina live-action series is set to premiere in 2025. In August 2025, it was announced the series would be titled Vampirina: Teenage Vampire, which would show the titular protagonist (played by Kenzi Richardson) starting high school, and with the first two episodes premiering on Disney Channel on September 12, and all 16 episodes on Disney+ on October 15. It would end a year later with a 6 epsiode order for Season 2.
