= All Over the Guy =

2001 film by Julie Davis

- Theatrical release poster
- Directed by: Julie Davis
- Written by: Dan Bucatinsky
- Produced by: Susan Dietz; Juan Mas; Dan Bucatinsky; Donnie Land
- Starring: Sasha Alexander; Dan Bucatinsky; Adam Goldberg; Joanna Kerns; Lisa Kudrow; Andrea Martin; Christina Ricci; Doris Roberts; Richard Ruccolo
- Cinematography: Goran Pavicevic
- Edited by: Glenn Garland; Mary Morrisey
- Music by: Peter Stuart; Andrew Williams
- Distributed by: Lions Gate Films
- Release date: August 10, 2001
- Running time: 95 minutes
- Country: United States
- Language: English
- Box office: $1 million

All Over the Guy is a 2001 American gay-themed romantic comedy film directed by Julie Davis and written by Dan Bucatinsky, based on Bucatinsky's 1997 stage play, I Know You Are, But What Am I?

== Plot ==
The film is told mostly in flashback; with Eli (Dan Bucatinsky) recounting his side to Esther (Doris Roberts), an HIV clinic worker as he waits for test results and Tom (Richard Ruccolo) telling his side to a man he meets at an Alcoholics Anonymous meeting. Tom is the son of emotionally distant alcoholic WASP parents who never quite accepted his sexual orientation and as a result is a heavy drinker himself and has a penchant for random hookups with different men. Eli's parents are both Jewish psychiatrists who raised him to be emotionally open but ended up making him neurotic.

Tom and Eli are set up on a blind date by their best friends, Jackie (Sasha Alexander) and Brett (Adam Goldberg), who think they would be a perfect match. They are both looking for 'The One', but don't recognize it when they find it. On the date, a boring evening is broken up only by an amusing diatribe by Tom against the movie In & Out. A few days later they run into each other at a flea market and hit it off, winding up back at Eli's place where Tom spends the night. The next morning Tom says that it was a mistake.

Jackie and Brett decide to try again to set them up, and the two men start to develop a relationship. Tom's fear of becoming emotionally close coupled with Eli's own insecurities makes it difficult for them to maintain, but Jackie and Brett get engaged which forces Tom and Eli together. They disguise their unease behind petty arguments over meaningless details of grammar and pronunciation but are finally able to push past the pettiness and make love. Eli tells Tom he loves him and Tom, terrified, lashes out at him the next day and drives him away.

The flashbacks end here on the day of Brett and Jackie's wedding. Esther tries to teach Eli to be more understanding of Tom's emotional needs. The AA member tries to sexually assault Tom and when he tells Jackie, she upbraids him for throwing Eli away for daring to fall for him. At the reception, Eli and Tom come to realize that they have to overcome their families' dysfunction and their own fears.

== Release ==
All Over the Guy premiered in 2001, with a small band called Kara's Flowers on hand to perform at the after party. That band later changed its name to Maroon 5.

== Critical reception ==
The film received mixed reviews from critics. Review aggregator Rotten Tomatoes reports that 43% out of 47 professional critics gave the film a positive review, with an average rating of 4.9/10. Metacritic, which uses a weighted average, assigned the film a score of 46 out of 100, based on 20 critics, indicating "mixed or average" reviews.

Kevin Maynard from Mr. Showbiz wrote “While both leads are appealing enough, it’s the stuff on the sidelines that keeps All Over the Guy entertaining.” Kevin Thomas of the Los Angeles Times wrote “A romantic comedy of wit and substance that actor-writer Dan Bucatinsky and director Julie Davis have moved gracefully from stage to screen with a change of title and sexual orientation.”

Albert Nowicki of Queer.pl praised the movie, called it "a classic of LGBT cinema," and noted: "This is a film about the struggles of dating, challenging each other, about dealing with problems and escaping from them. All Over the Guy doesn't feature faultless heroes, nor does it have perfectly articulated, calculated speeches that sound artificially and kitschy — like 'I'm just a girl...' from Notting Hill. Instead, we are presented with rationally outlined characters openly discussing their weaknesses. Natural performances from the actors make it easy to identify with them."
