= Cynthia Ettinger =

American actress

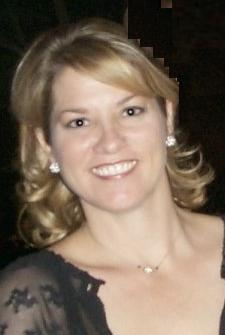
- Ettinger in 2009
- Occupation: Actress
- Spouse: Wally Kurth (m. 1990; div. 1993)

Cynthia Ettinger is an American character actress, known for her roles on HBO television series Carnivàle and Deadwood.

== Career ==
Ettinger made her screen debut appearing in the 1989 comedy film, Martians Go Home. She later appeared in films Brain Dead (1990), The Silence of the Lambs (1991), Down, Out & Dangerous (1995), Deep Impact (1998), Frailty (2001) and Thirteen (2003). On television, she appeared in "The Parking Garage" episode of the sitcom Seinfeld and later had guest-starring appearances on Lois & Clark: The New Adventures of Superman and Touched by an Angel and the televised play Fail Safe (2000) by Stephen Frears.

In 2001, Ettinger was originally cast as Martha Kent in the superhero series Smallville, but during filming everyone realized that she was not right for the role, including Ettinger. She turned to theater jobs, and when the opportunity for HBO series Carnivàle came up, she chose that project because of the theater-like experience. The series ran from 2003 to 2005. She also made two different guest appearances on Law & Order: Special Victims Unit. In 2004 she played a fellatio teacher in Season 4, Episode 10 of Curb Your Enthusiasm. In 2006, Ettinger continued the momentum, landing a ten-episode run on another HBO series Deadwood, where she played Claudia. She also made guest-starring appearances on ER, House and Grey's Anatomy. In 2018 she had recurring role in another HBO drama, Here and Now.

== Personal life ==
Ettinger met actor Wally Kurth when they were in college. They were friends for years before beginning a relationship. They dated for a year and a half before marrying in May 1990. They divorced in 1993.
