= Julie Davis =

American film director, writer and actress

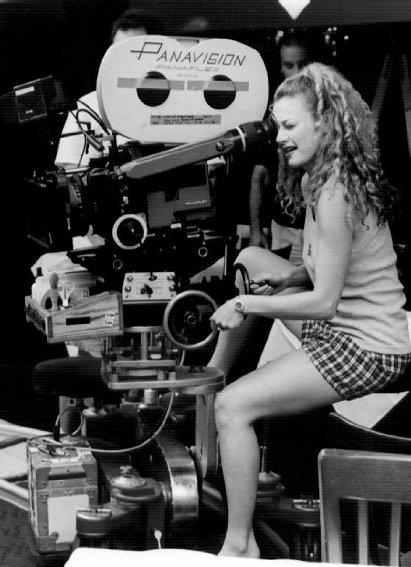
- Davis Behind the camera on set of Amy's Orgasm, early 2001
- Born: 1969 (age 56–57); United States
- Education: Dartmouth College (1990)
- Occupations: Film director, screenwriter, actress
- Years active: 1994–present

Julie Davis (born 1969) is an American film director, writer and actress. Davis is best known for directing, writing and acting in the romantic comedy film Amy's Orgasm. Davis' first film, the ultra low-budget I Love You, Don't Touch Me! debuted at the 1997 Sundance Film Festival. She also directed the cult gay romantic comedy All Over the Guy in 2001 and the 2010 film Finding Bliss, based on her experiences as an editor at the Playboy Channel.

== Early life and education ==
Davis grew up in a Jewish family in Miami, Florida. As a child, she spent her summers at the Interlochen Arts Academy studying classical piano. She attended Southwood Middle School and graduated from Miami Palmetto High School in 1986. She attended Dartmouth College, graduating in 1990. At Dartmouth, she majored in Comparative Literature and spent nine months living in Mainz, Germany and Toulouse, France. After graduating from Dartmouth, Davis attended the AFI Conservatory's editing training program, graduating in 1991.

== Career ==
In 1995, she moved to Los Angeles where she got her start in the film business by editing and directing ultra-low-budget films. While editing promos for the Playboy Channel, she raised $60,000 to make her first feature I Love You, Don't Touch Me! which premiered at the Sundance Film Festival in 1997 and was sold to the Samuel Goldwyn Company. Davis was compared to a female Woody Allen.

Davis' second film Amy's Orgasm won the Audience Choice Award for best feature at the Santa Barbara International Film Festival in 2001.

== Filmography ==
Director (4 titles)

- 2009 Finding Bliss
- 2001 All Over the Guy
- 2001 Amy's Orgasm
- 1997 I Love You, Don't Touch Me!

Actress (5 titles)

- 2014 The M Word as Julie
- 2012 Just 45 Minutes from Broadway as Betsy Isaacs
- 2009 Finding Bliss as Dyan Cannons
- 2001 Amy's Orgasm as Amy Mandell
- 1997 I Love You, Don't Touch Me! as Lisa

Writer (3 titles)

- 2009 Finding Bliss
- 2001 Amy's Orgasm
- 1997 I Love You, Don't Touch Me!
