= Caroline Aaron =

American actress (born 1952)

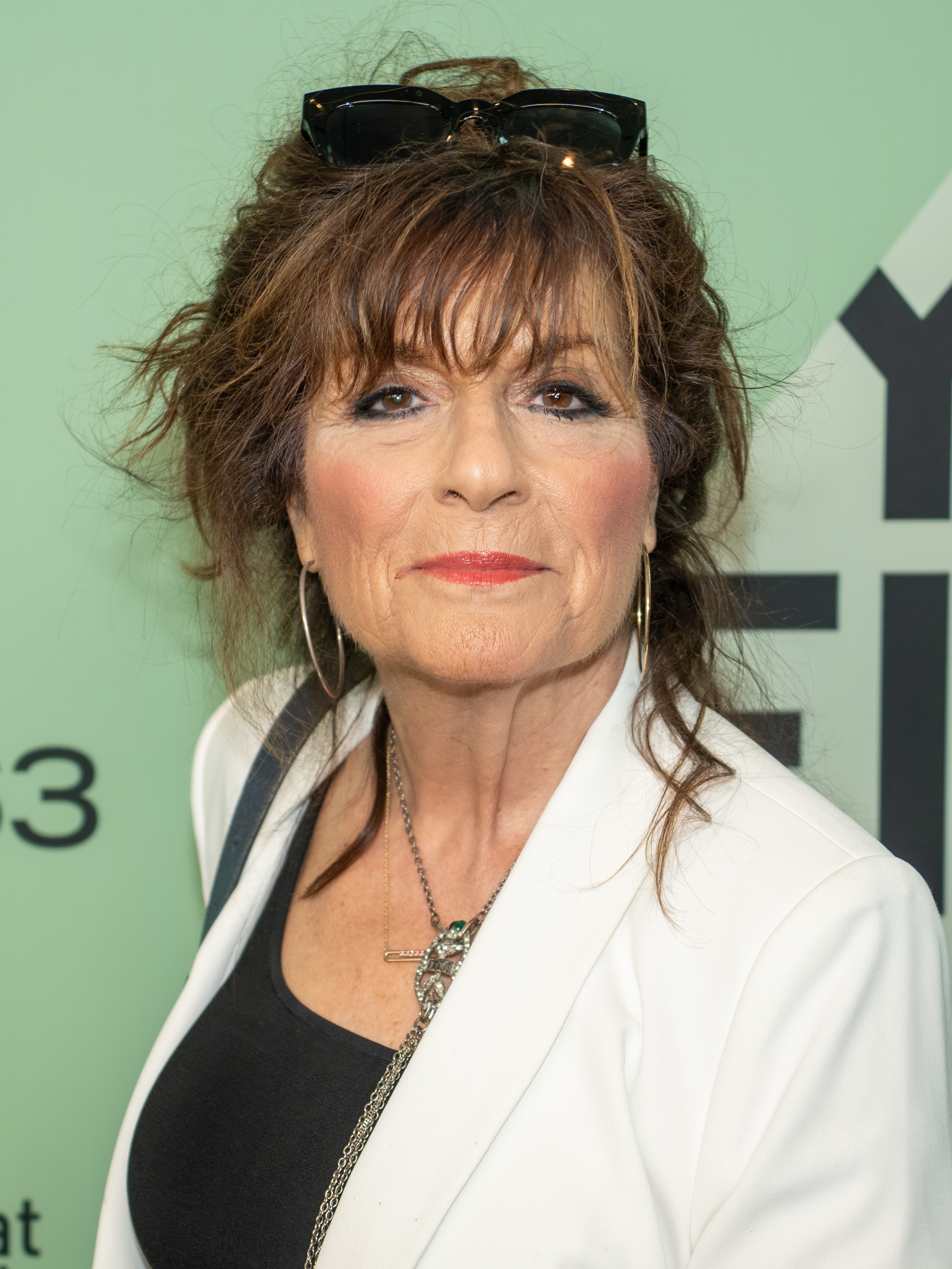
- Aaron at the 2025 New York Film Festival
- Born: Caroline Sidney Abady; August 7, 1952 (age 73); Richmond, Virginia, U.S.
- Education: American University (B.A.); HB Studio
- Occupation: Actress
- Years active: 1982–present
- Spouse: James Foreman (m. 1980)
- Children: 2
- Relatives: Josephine Abady (sister)

Caroline Sidney Aaron (née Abady; born August 7, 1952) is an American actress. She has appeared in multiple Mike Nichols, Nora Ephron, and Woody Allen films and is also known for her role in the television series The Marvelous Mrs. Maisel.

== Early life ==
Aaron was born in Richmond, Virginia. Her mother, Nina Abady (née Friedman), was a civil rights activist; Alabama-raised, she was of Syrian descent, and worked full time to support her three kids after the death of Aaron's father, who was of Lebanese-Jewish descent. Aaron's elder sister, Josephine Abady, a theatre director and producer, died from breast cancer on May 25, 2002, aged 52.

== Education ==
Aaron attended American University in Washington, D.C., studying performing arts. She studied acting at HB Studio in New York City.

== Career ==
Aaron is known for her performances in films like Mike Nichols' Heartburn (1986) and Primary Colors (1998), as well as Woody Allen's Crimes and Misdemeanors (1989), Alice (1990), and Deconstructing Harry (1997), and Nora Ephron's Sleepless in Seattle (1993). She also appeared in Tim Burton's Edward Scissorhands (1990) and Stanley Tucci's Big Night (1996). She also appeared in 21 Jump Street (2012) and its sequel 22 Jump Street (2014).

She is also known for her work on television, including guest roles on Wings, Frasier, Curb Your Enthusiasm, Desperate Housewives, Transparent, Madam Secretary, The Good Fight, and Ghosts.

Her Broadway roles include Relatively Speaking, I Hate Hamlet, Social Security, and The Iceman Cometh.

She was a regular on the critically acclaimed and Primetime Emmy Award-winning show The Marvelous Mrs. Maisel (2017–2023), with her comic performance of a Jewish mother winning her two consecutive Screen Actors Guild Awards for Outstanding Performance by an Ensemble in a Comedy Series alongside the rest of the series' cast.

Aaron is a guest instructor at HB Studio.

== Personal life ==
She has been married to James Foreman since 1980; they have two children.

== Filmography ==
=== Film ===
Year	Title	Role	Notes
1982	Come Back to the 5 & Dime, Jimmy Dean, Jimmy Dean	Teenager	
1983	Without a Trace	Makeup Woman	
1983	Baby, It's You	Waitress	
1984	The Brother from Another Planet	Randy Sue Carter	
1985	O.C. and Stiggs	Janine	
1986	Heartburn	Judith	
1987	Anna	Interviewer	
1988	Working Girl	Petty Marsh Secretary	
1989	Crimes and Misdemeanors	Barbara	
1990	Edward Scissorhands	Marge	
1990	Alice	Sue	
1992	This Is My Life	Martha Ingels	
1992	Husbands and Wives	Dinner Party Guests	
1993	The Pickle	Nancy Osborne	
1993	Sleepless in Seattle	Dr. Marcia Fieldstone	
1994	Mixed Nuts	Hotline Caller	
1995	A Modern Affair	Elaine	
1996	Big Night	Woman in restaurant	
1996	House Arrest	Louise Finley	
1997	White Lies	Virginia Past	
1997	Deconstructing Harry	Doris Block	
1997	Dinner and Driving	Roz	
1998	Primary Colors	Lucille Kaufman	
1998	There's No Fish Food in Heaven	Venessa	
1999	A Fine Day for Flying	Madelyn	Short film
1999	Anywhere but Here	Gail Letterfine	
2000	What Planet Are You From?	Nadine Jones	
2000	Lucky Numbers	Nurse Sharpling	
2000	Bounce	Donna	
2001	Nobody's Baby	Doctor	
2001	Amy's Orgasm	Janet Gaines	
2001	Joe Dirt	Mrs. Nunamaker	
2001	Never Again	Elaine	
2002	Pumpkin	Claudia Prinsinger	
2003	Two Days	Mrs. Miller	
2004	Along Came Polly	Lois The Wedding Planner/Coordinator	
2004	Call Waiting	Judy Baxter / Carol Lane	
2004	A Day Without a Mexican	Aunt Gigi	
2004	Cellular	Marilyn Mooney	
2004	Beyond the Sea	Nina Cassotto Maffia	
2005	Just like Heaven	Grace	
2006	Grilled	Faye Goldbluth	
2007	My First Time Driving	Helen	Short film
2007	Nancy Drew	Barbara Barbara	
2007	Love Comes Lately	Rachel Meyerowitz	
2008	Surveillance	Janet	
2009	Finding Bliss	Debra Balaban	
2009	Love Hurts	Wanda	
2010	Our Family Wedding	Elaine	
2010	Meeting Spencer	Nancy Diamond	
2012	21 Jump Street	Annie Schmidt	
2013	Sex & Marriage	Beatrice	Video
2013	Tuna	Virginia	
2014	22 Jump Street	Annie Schmidt	
2014	The Rewrite	Ellen	
2014	Planes: Fire & Rescue	Additional Voices	
2016	Hello, My Name Is Doris	Val	
2017	Breakable You	Judith Singer	
2017	Bitch	Nana	
2022	Christmas vs. the Walters	Jane	
2023	Theater Camp	Rita Cohen	
2024	Between the Temples	Meira Gottlieb	

=== Television ===
Year	Title	Role	Notes
1989	The Days and Nights of Molly Dodd	Waitress	Episode: "Here's a Leisurely Stroll Through the Park"
1991	Dead and Alive: The Race for Gus Farace	Dolly	Television movie
1991–1992	Law & Order	Susan / Valerie Walker	2 episodes
1995	Empty Nest	Shannon	Episode: "Feelings, Whoa Whoa Whoa, Feelings"
1995	Mad About You	Trish Dawson	Episode: "Two Tickets to Paradise"
1995	If Not For You	Nina	Episodes: "Taking a Shower with My Two True Loves", "The Kiss"
1995	Dad, the Angel & Me	Abby	Television movie
1995, 1997	Wings	Mary Pat Lee	2 Episodes: "Ex, Lies and Videotape" and "Let's Talk About Sex"
1996	The Boys Next Door	Mrs. Warren	Television movie
1996	Hey Arnold!	Spelling Bee Moderator / Landlady (voice)	2 episodes
1996	Dave's World	Judy	Episode: "Stress"
1997	Early Edition	Dr. Susan Leonard	Episode: "Frostbite"
1997	Weapons of Mass Distraction	Robin Zimmer	Television movie
1998	LateLine	Amy Freundlich / Rhonda Laskey	Voice; Recurring role (4 episodes)
1998	Frasier	Phyllis Conrad	Episode: "First Date"
1998	Sex and the City	Pamela Glock	Episode: "The Monogamists"
1999	Ally McBeal	Laura Dipson	Episode: "Love Unlimited"
1999	NYPD Blue	Doris Steinman	Episode: "Big Bang Theory"
1999	The Practice	Delores Keplar	Episode: "Of Human Bondage"
1999	Tracey Takes On...	Bev Millis	Episode: "Hype"
1999	Payne	Diane Taggert	Episode: "I Never Forget a Face-Lift"
1999	Tuesdays with Morrie	Connie	Television movie
2000	Judging Amy	Eloise Darline	Episodes: "Zero to Sixty", "The Wee Hours"
2000	An American Daughter	Veronica	Television movie
2000	Running Mates	Jody Daniels	Television movie
2000	Family Law	Sharon	Episode: "The Choice"
2000	Gideon's Crossing	Nancy Bales	Episode: "The Gift"
2001	When Billie Beat Bobby	Gladys Heldman	Television movie
2001	Six Feet Under	Amelia	Episode: "The Foot"
2001	The Mind of the Married Man	Mother In Law	Episode: "The Secret of the Universe"
2001	Inside Schwartz	Bernice	Episode: "Play-Action Fake Boyfriend"
2001–2002	7th Heaven	Sally Palmer	2 episodes
2002	Greg the Bunny	Casting Director	Episode: "Piddler on the Roof"
2002	The Secret Life of Zoey	Mimi	Television movie
2002	Less than Perfect	Roz	Episode: "Future Shock"
2002	Curb Your Enthusiasm	Barbara	3 episodes
2002–2004	One on One	Cheryl Ballard	3 episodes
2003	Dragnet	District Attorney	Episode: "All That Glitters"
2003	Lucky	Theresa's Sponsor	Episode: "Monkey on Your Back"
2003	Miss Match	Judy Schiff	Episode: "The Love Bandit"
2004	Oliver Beene	Charlotte's Mum	Episode: "Disposa-Boy"
2004	Revenge of the Middle-Aged Woman	Madeleine	Television movie
2004	Malcolm in the Middle	Nurse Peterson	Episode: "Reese Comes Home"
2005	Head Cases	Ida Shultz	Episode: "Pilot"
2005	Girlfriends	Michele Garrett	Episode: "All God's Children"
2006	Shark	Judge Sylvia Howard	Episode: "Fashion Police"
2007	Brothers & Sisters	Elise	Episode: "Sexual Politics"
2007	Entourage	Sheila Rubenstein	Episode: "Return of the King"
2007	Grey's Anatomy	Connie	Episode: "Let the Truth Sting"
2008	Ugly Betty	Judge Biotch	Episode: "Odor in the Court"
2008	Boston Legal	Phyllis Goulet	Episode: "True Love"
2008	CSI: Crime Scene Investigation	Mrs. Steiner	Episode: "19 Down"
2009	Monk	Sheila Dorfman	Episode: "Mr. Monk and the Magician"
2009	CSI: Miami	Dr. Miller	Episode: "Bad Seed"
2009	Desperate Housewives	Daphne Bicks	Episode: "Boom Crunch"
2009–2016	American Dad!	Waitress (voice)	2 episodes
2010	The Young and the Restless	JoJo	5 episodes
2010	Players	Olivia DiMarco	Episode: "Krista's Mom"
2010	Private Practice	Stephanie	Episode: "War"
2010	Childrens Hospital	Glenn's Mom	Episode: "Frankfurters. Allman Brothers. Death. Frankfurters."
2011	Happy Endings	Pauline Blum	Episode: "Mein Coming Out"
2011-2013	Franklin & Bash	Judge Rebecca Bayles	2 episodes
2012	Rizzoli & Isles	Dana	Episode: "Class Action Satisfaction"
2012	Up All Night	Marla	Episode: "First Snow"
2013	2 Broke Girls	Wiga	Episode: "And the Psychic Shakedown"
2013	Modern Family	Judge Bartley	Episode: "Goodnight Gracie"
2014–2017	Episodes	Linda	3 episodes
2014	Instant Mom	Beverly Keogh	2 episodes
2014	Bad Teacher	Doris	Episode: "A Little Respect"
2014	The Millers	Kathy	Episode: "Movin' Out (Carol's Song)"
2014–2015	Transparent	Judy	3 episodes
2015	Secrets and Lies	Ellie Lindsey	Episode: "The Sister"
2016	Life in Pieces	Karyl	Episode: "CryTunes Divorce Tablet Ring"
2016	Code Black	Barbara Abbott	Episode: "1.0 Bodies"
2016	The Odd Couple	Christina	Episode: "The Odd Couples"
2017	Doubt	Judge Eugenia Souza	Episode: "The Return"
2017–2019	Madam Secretary	Edie Moran	2 episodes
2017–2023	The Marvelous Mrs. Maisel	Shirley Maisel	29 episodes
2018	The Good Fight	Lucy Heinberg	Episode: "Day 415"
2018	The Good Cop	Olivia Nyborg	Episode: "Who Cut Mrs. Ackroyd in Half"
2018	I Feel Bad	Irene	Episode: "My Kids Barely Know Their Culture"
2020	Outmatched	Sylvia Bennet	Episode: "Grandparents"
2021–	Ghosts	Carol	Recurring, 5 episodes
2022	Chanshi	Babshi	Recurring role; Israeli-American co-production

=== Theatre ===
Year	Title	Role	Playwright	Notes	Ref.
1985	The Iceman Cometh	Cora	Eugene O'Neill	Lunt-Fontanne Theatre, Broadway	
1986	Social Security	Trudy Hayman; Barbara Kahn	Andrew Bergman	Ethel Barrymore Theatre, Broadway	
1991	I Hate Hamlet	Felicia Dantine	Paul Rudnick	Walter Kerr Theatre, Broadway	
2007	The Ritz	Vivian Proclo	Terrence McNally	Studio 54, Broadway	
2011	Honeymoon Hotel	Judy Spector	Woody Allen	Brooks Atkinson Theatre, Broadway	
2023	Madwomen of the West	Performer	Thomas Caruso	Actors Temple Theatre, Off-Broadway	
2024	Bye Bye Birdie	Mae Peterson	Michael Stewart	Eisenhower Theater, The Kennedy Center, Washington, DC	
2025	Conversations with Mother	Maria Collavechio	Matthew Lombardo	Theatre555, Off-Broadway	
2026	The Reservoir	Ensemble	Jake Brasch	Atlantic Theatre Company, Off-Broadway	

=== Video games ===
Year	Title	Role	Notes	Ref.
2015	Fallout 4	Additional Voices	Video Game	

=== Audiobooks, Audio Entertainment and Podcasts ===
Year	Title	Role	Notes	Ref.
2022–2023	Around the Sun	Kathy / Nina	Audio drama	
1999	The Prisoner of Second Avenue	Edna	L.A. Theatre Works	
2005	The Sisters Rosensweig	Pfeni	L.A. Theatre Works	

== Award and nominations ==
Year	Award	Category	Title	Result	Ref.
2018	Screen Actors Guild Award	Outstanding Ensemble in a Comedy Series	The Marvelous Mrs. Maisel	Won	
2019	Screen Actors Guild Award	Outstanding Ensemble in a Comedy Series	The Marvelous Mrs. Maisel	Won	
2026	Outer Critics Circle Award	Outstanding Featured Performer in an Off-Broadway Play	The Reservoir	Won	
2026	Drama Desk Award	Outstanding Featured Performance in a Play	The Reservoir	Nominated	
2026	Drama League Award	Distinguished Performance	The Reservoir	Nominated	
2026	Dorian Award	Outstanding Featured Performance in an Off-Broadway Production	The Reservoir	Nominated	
