= Final Embrace (film) =

- Directed by: Oley Sassone
- Written by: R.J. Robertson; Jim Wynorski
- Release date: 1992
- Country: USA
- Language: English

Final Embrace is a 1992 American thriller film directed by Oley Sassone.

== Plot ==
A pop singer is killed. A detective investigates.

== Cast ==
- Robert Rusler as Kyle Lambton
- Nancy Valen as Candy Vale / Laurel Parrish
- Dick Van Patten as Larch
- Dee McCafferty as Adrian Waring
- Linda Dona as Jeri
- Wally Kurth
