= Best Men =

- DVD cover
- Directed by: Tamra Davis
- Written by: Art Edler Brown; Tracy Fraim
- Produced by: Brad Krevoy; Steve Stabler; Brad Jenkel; Deborah Ridpath
- Starring: Dean Cain; Andy Dick; Sean Patrick Flanery; Mitchell Whitfield; Luke Wilson; Drew Barrymore
- Cinematography: James Glennon
- Edited by: Paul Trejo
- Music by: Mark Mothersbaugh
- Production company: Orion Pictures
- Distributed by: Metro-Goldwyn-Mayer (United States); Rank Film Distributors (through FilmFour Distributors, United Kingdom)
- Release date: October 17, 1997
- Running time: 90 minutes
- Countries: United States; United Kingdom
- Language: English
- Budget: $14 million
- Box office: $5,000 (domestic)

Best Men is a 1997 American crime comedy film directed by Tamra Davis, and stars Sean Patrick Flanery, Luke Wilson, Andy Dick, Mitchell Whitfield, Fred Ward, Drew Barrymore, and Dean Cain.

In the film, a man's wedding is set for the day of his release from prison. His four best friends will serve as groomsmen. One of the friends has recently started robbing banks, and he stops for another bank robbery on the way to the ceremony. The other men enter the bank after him and unwittingly create a hostage situation. The FBI takes over the hostage negotiation. But the lead agent plans to execute all of the "robbers", and is not interested in the safety of the hostages.

The film received a brief theatrical release in the United Kingdom on March 27, 1998.

== Plot ==
Four groomsmen are preparing for a wedding, donning tuxedos. Buzz, a former soldier, has a few handguns in his tuxedo, Teddy, a browbeaten house husband, is meticulously getting ready, Sol, a former criminal lawyer now specializing in divorce, dresses neatly while Billy, a failing actor, is shown watching a newscast. The reporter describes a recent bank robbery where the robber recited works by William Shakespeare before escaping.

All four meet up, walking towards the prison where Jesse is being released after three years for an unspecified crime. Sol and Jesse have a heated argument as Sol's error as his attorney led to Jesse's incarceration.

Jesse is marrying Hope, surrounded by his best friends. En route to the ceremony, Billy asks them to pull over near a bank. He commences to rob it (he is the Shakespeare robber from the earlier newscast). As he finishes, reciting Shakespeare, Buzz comes in to hurry him up, stopping the robbery, unveiling Billy in the process. The others then walk in, inadvertently creating a hostage situation. When the police arrive, they realise their predicament: they are all accomplices, facing serious prison time.

However, the bank customers bond with the five unlikely robbers. Outside the bank Billy's dad, Sheriff Philips, demands he surrenders, mocking him for being a failure. Billy confronts him, refusing. Inside the bank, it's suggested that Billy release some of the hostages. One of them, Gonzo suggests they request a chopper land on the roof so he can fly them to safety. Buzz bonds with Gonzo, a Vietnam veteran, he tells him his life dream was to serve in the military but, being gay, he was not allowed to. Seeing his pain, he gifts Buzz his military jacket. Outside the FBI arrives to take over the hostage negotiation.

Lead agent Hoover shows little regard for the hostages, planning to execute the five robbers as they exit the bank. Sheriff Philips approaches the bank and Billy finally confronts his father for being a lousy parent. He realises he was never there for his son. Billy agrees to allow some of the hostages to go, Gonzo amongst them. All of the freed hostages refuse to identify Billy or his friends.

The gang negotiates for Jesse and Hope to be married in the bank; Hoover agrees for a priest to go in and perform the ceremony. During the wedding, the priest turns out to be a federal agent, and Teddy and Buzz are shot during a struggle. Teddy, feeling like the bank robbery has woken him up, refuses to be sent to the hospital for urgent care but eventually acquiesces. Buzz patches his wound and the guys plot their exit from the bank.

Sol goes outside, negotiating a deal with Hoover to get everyone out. As he re-enters the bank, Hoover orders his men to gun them down. Sol and the guys, with the remaining hostages, leave the bank draped in a giant American flag. The snipers, unable to pick out the guys, refuse to shoot indiscriminately (or shoot at the flag). As everyone enters the bus, Sol tells Jesse he's sorry and Hope forgives him. He then steps off the bus and announces the deal he brokered involved him surrendering to save Jesse and the guys. Hoover, however, reneges on the deal; Sol holds him at gunpoint so the police cars let the bus go. As the bus leaves, he is shot and killed by the snipers. Sheriff Philips then blocks the feds with his police cruiser, giving Billy time to get away.

As the bus heads to the local airport, the feds start to catch up, and Buzz drives it off the main road. Gonzo then appears in a military helicopter and Jesse and Hope escape onto the chopper. However, Billy and Buzz are unable to, remaining behind. Surrounded by the feds, in a final bloody shootout, the two best friends die but not before Buzz gets off a shot killing Hoover.

The film ends with Jesse and Hope playing with a son some years later on a beach in Mexico.

== Cast ==
- Dean Cain as Sergeant Buzz Thomas
- Andy Dick as Teddy Pollack
- Sean Patrick Flanery as Billy Phillips
- Mitchell Whitfield as Sol Jacobs
- Luke Wilson as Jesse Reilly
- Drew Barrymore as Hope
- Fred Ward as Sheriff Bud Phillips
- Raymond J. Barry as Agent Hoover
- Brad Dourif as John "Gonzo" Coleman
- Tracy Fraim as Cuervo
- Biff Yeager as Mayor Boar
- Art Edler Brown as Agent Carter
- K. K. Dodds as Cindy Vargas
- Kathryn Joosten as Edie
- Dee Maaske as Dorothy

== Reception ==
On the review aggregation website Rotten Tomatoes, the film holds an approval rating of 13% based on 8 reviews.

Reviewing the film for Variety, critic Derek Elley praised the cast and said "At heart, 'Best Men' is a modest picture that harks back in many ways to U.S. movies of the late '60s and early '70s in its unconventional attitudes and anti-establishment tone. Pacing never lingers, and, unlike in 'Guncrazy,' there’s no narrative fat; at the same time, there isn’t much emotional residue either. In short, it’s simply a quality B movie."
