= I Love You, Don't Touch Me! =

1997 American romantic comedy film by Julie Davis

- Directed by: Julie Davis
- Written by: Julie Davis
- Produced by: Scott Chosed; Julie Davis
- Starring: Marla Schaffel; Mitchell Whitfield; Michael Harris; Meredith Scott Lynn
- Cinematography: Mark Putnam
- Edited by: Julie Davis
- Production company: Goldwyn Entertainment Company
- Distributed by: Orion Pictures
- Release date: January 21, 1997 (Sundance Film Festival)
- Running time: 86 minutes
- Country: United States
- Language: English

I Love You, Don't Touch Me! is a 1997 American independent romantic comedy film written and directed by Julie Davis and starring Marla Schaffel and Mitchell Whitfield.

== Plot ==
Katie is a 25-year-old virgin living in Los Angeles who wants to save herself for the ideal man. As time passes, however, she becomes convinced the ideal man does not exist. Katie is good friends with Ben, who is crazy about her and wants to move their relationship from friendship to romance; she does not feel the same way about him, however. When Katie meets Richard, a talented British songwriter, she thinks that she may have finally found the right man.

== Cast ==
- Marla Schaffel as Katie
- Mitchell Whitfield as Ben
- Michael Harris as Richard Webber
- Meredith Scott Lynn as Janet
- Jack McGee as Lou Candela
- Darryl Theirse as Jones
- Julie Ariola as Mom
- Nancy Sorel as Elizabeth
- Wally Kurth as David Barclay
- Victor Raider-Wexler as Dad
- Sara Van Horn as Analyst
- Debbie Munroe as Margo
- Tim de Zarn as Vagrant
- Janine Venable as Deidre
- Michael A. Candela as Audition Man
- Ramesh Pandey as Bob Yager
- George Saunders as Ted
- Jackie Debatin as Jenny
