= Josephine Abady =

American stage director, film director, and producer

- Born: August 21, 1949; Richmond, Virginia, U.S.
- Died: May 25, 2002 (aged 52); New York City, New York, U.S.
- Education: Syracuse University (BA); Florida State University (MFA)
- Family: Caroline Aaron (sister)

Josephine R. "Josie" Abady (August 21, 1949 – May 25, 2002) was an American stage director, film director, and producer.

== Early life and education ==
Abady's mother Nina (née Friedman) was an Alabama-raised civil rights activist of Syrian Jewish descent who worked full time to support her three kids after Aaron's father, who was of Lebanese-Jewish descent, passed away. Her sister is actress Caroline Aaron.

Abady graduated from Syracuse University and earned her MFA from Florida State University.

== Theatrical career ==
Abady taught theater at Bennington College and was head of the theater program at Hampshire College in Amherst, Massachusetts before she began her professional career as the artistic director of the Berkshire Theater Festival (in Stockbridge, Massachusetts). She opened the season at the Cleveland Play House with a revival of Born Yesterday, starring Ed Asner and Madeline Kahn, a production that moved to Broadway.

From 1994 to 1996, Abady was one of the two artistic directors of the Circle in the Square Theatre, along with Theodore Mann.

== Film and TV work ==
Abady also did film and TV work, including, with the assistance provided by an American Film Institute grant, To Catch a Tiger, a short film inspired by the life of Nina Friedman Abady, Abady's own mother. She later co-produced a TV remake of A Raisin in the Sun, which starred Esther Rolle and Danny Glover.

== Last years ==
Despite her advanced breast cancer, she was active during the last years of her life, until her death, at her home in Manhattan, aged 52.

== Affiliations ==
- Member, League of Professional Theatre Women
