= Justin Kiriakis =

Soap opera character

- Days of Our Lives character
- Portrayed by: Wally Kurth
- Duration: 1987–1991; 2009–present
- First appearance: February 3, 1987
- Created by: Leah Laiman
- Introduced by: Betty Corday, Ken Corday and Al Rabin
In-universe information
- Occupation: District Attorney lawyer businessman
- Family: Kiriakis
- Father: Alexander Kiriakis
- Mother: Christina Kiriakis
- Spouse: Adrienne Johnson (1987–2015, 2019) (Note: The first ceremony for Justin and Adrienne was on November 16, 1987. They divorced for the first time on March 6, 1990. The second marriage between them took place three months later on June 26, 1990, until their divorce in 2010. The couple remarried in 2011 and divorced again in 2015. However, they were married consecutively from 1987 to 2015.); Bonnie Lockhart (2021–present)
- Sons: Alexander Kiriakis; Sonny Kiriakis
- Adoptive sons: Joey Kiriakis; Victor Kiriakis II
- Granddaughters: Arianna Horton (adoptive); Kelsey Wesley
- Grandparents: Yurgos Kiriakis; Sophie Kiriakis
- Uncles: Victor Kiriakis; Titus Kiriakis; Deimos Kiriakis
- First cousins: Isabella Toscano; Bo Brady; Philip Kiriakis; Xander Kiriakis
- Other relatives: Brady Black; Shawn-Douglas Brady; Chelsea Brady; Zack Brady; Ciara Brady; Tyler Kiriakis; Claire Brady

Justin Kiriakis is a fictional character on the NBC daytime soap opera Days of Our Lives. Created by head writer Leah Laiman, he is portrayed by actor Wally Kurth from February 3, 1987, to February 5, 1991. From 2007 to 2008, Justin was mentioned but not seen on screen. Kurth reprised the role again August 10, 2009, remaining in the role for nearly five years before departing on April 3, 2014. However, he once again returned in February 2015. Justin is the nephew of Greek tycoon Victor Kiriakis. Justin married Adrienne Johnson Kiriakis, and together they have three sons while Justin has one by a past romance.

Kurth's performance has been met with critical acclaim, having garnered him a Daytime Emmy Award nomination for Outstanding Supporting Actor in a Drama Series in 2020.

== Casting and characterization ==
Wally Kurth joined DAYS in 1987 and was successfully paired with Judi Evans, who played his wife Adrienne Johnson Kiriakis. After having studied music atal theater at Loretto Heights College in Denver and theater arts at UCLA, Kurth spent a number of years working as a horse ranger, meat packer, telemarketer and appeared in several theater productions before landing his first daytime role on the NBC soap opera. Kurth was also nominated for "Hottest Male Star" at the 1996 Soap Opera Digest Awards. He remained with the show until 1991 and soon joined ABC's General Hospital as Ned Ashton that same year. He found great success in the role and remained on the show until 2007, later accepting the short-term role of Sam Hutchins on the CBS soap opera As the World Turns from 2007 to 2008. Outside of acting, Kurth ventured into hosting duties with his reality show 1 Day With on SOAPnet from 2004 to 2005, which feature him documenting the daily lives of soap stars. Kurth most recently appeared on NBC's primetime drama Law & Order: Los Angeles on April 11, 2011, which coincided with the final episode starring Skeet Ulrich. Kurth has also made a name for himself in music as the lead singer and guitarist of "Kurth & Taylor." He also won a Daytime Emmy Award for Outstanding Original Song for his song "Barefoot Ballet" on GH in 2002, which he shared with his bandmate Christian Taylor and lyricist Debi Cochran. In March 2015, Kurth was placed on contract with the series.

In December 2015, Kurth along with Judi Evans were downgraded back to recurring status. In October 2019, it was announced that Kurth was bumped back to regular status. In March of the following year, Kurth clarified the reports, stating he was still under recurring status.

== Storylines ==
=== 1987–1991 ===
Justin Kiriakis arrived in town to become reacquainted with his uncle Victor Kiriakis, from whom he had become estranged since the death of his parents. Justin became accustomed to the family's questionable conduct as he ran his construction company. He soon met the love of his life Adrienne Johnson. Adrienne was unlike anyone Justin had known since she had not grown up in a privileged family, but instead was raised in poverty by an abusive father and ineffectual mother. Victor objected to their relationship but they eventually married. They had their share of issues, primarily Justin's affair with Angelica Deveraux which resulted in a son, Alexander Kiriakis. Adrienne also had a relationship with Emilio Ramirez, whom Justin tried to have killed only to get caught in his own trap and become paralyzed from the waist down. Justin and Adrienne divorced and she opened a rival construction company before they remarried. The reunited couple had trouble conceiving a child, however their housekeeper, JJ Bagwood, allowed them to adopt her twins which they named Victor and Joseph. Following a custody trial with the biological father (Stanley), Justin and Adrienne were livid when the biological mother kidnapped the twins. After they were found, Adrienne learned she was pregnant and so she, Justin and their three children left town before the birth of their son Jackson (Sonny).

=== 2009–2015 ===
Justin returned to town after he became a lawyer and told his cousin Bo Brady and his wife Hope Williams Brady that he and Adrienne were on the brink of divorce. Bo and Hope were also not getting along and so Justin and Hope soon developed feelings for one another until ending any possibility for a relationship. Adrienne soon returned to town and after they struggle with their divorce the couple found their way back to each other and remarried. The couple soon welcomed their son Jackson "Sonny" Kiriakis back to town and it is revealed that he is gay. They support him as he comes out to his uncle Victor and as he makes a home for himself with his new life with Will Horton as his boyfriend. In 2013, Justin went into business with EJ DiMera as well as represented Sami when she was put on trial for the murder of dirty cop, Joseph Bernardi; at last second, she was found not guilty. On April 3, 2014, Justin was last shown attending and speaking at his son, Sonny`s wedding to Will Horton. He hadn't been seen since until returning in February 2015. In 2015, Justin and Adrienne divorce following his affair during a business trip to Mumbai. They decide not reconcile and instead begin seeing other people. While being the prosecutor against Chad DiMera during the necktie serial killings, he and Eve Donovan form a relationship.

== Reception ==
In 2024, Kurth was shortlisted for the Daytime Emmy Award for Outstanding Supporting Actor in a Drama Series for his role as Justin.

== See also ==
- Justin Kiriakis and Adrienne Johnson

== Bibliography ==
- Ken Corday (2010). The Days of our Lives: The True Story of One Family's Dream and the Untold History of Days of our Lives. Sourcebooks. p. 272. ISBN 978-1402242229.
- Maureen Russell (1995). Days of Our Lives: A Complete History of the Long-Running Soap Opera. McFarland & Company. p. 286. ISBN 0525943021.
- Lorraine Zenka (1999). Days of Our Lives: A Tour Through Salem. Dutton Adult. p. 288. ISBN 0786401125.
