= List of Vampirina episodes =

Vampirina is an animated children's television series created by Chris Nee. Based on the Vampirina Ballerina series of books written by Anne Marie Pace and published by Disney-Hyperion, the series premiered on Disney Junior and Disney Channel on October 1, 2017. It features much of the staff that has worked on another program created by Nee, Doc McStuffins.

The series ended on June 28, 2021, after 3 seasons and 75 episodes.

== Series overview ==
Season	Segments	Episodes	Originally released	
Season	Segments	Episodes	First released	Last released
1	49	25	October 1, 2017	November 23, 2018
2	49	25	December 7, 2018	April 10, 2020
3	49	25	October 5, 2020	June 28, 2021

== Episodes ==
=== Season 1 (2017–18) ===
No. overall	No. in season	Title	Directed by	Written by	Storyboard by	Original release date	Prod. code	US viewers (millions)
1	1	"Going Batty"	Nicky Phelan, Matt Engstrom	Chris Nee	Matt Engstrom	October 1, 2017	101	1.03 (Disney Channel); 0.72 (Disney Junior)
1	1	"Scare B&B"	Ehud Landsberg	Jeffrey King	Matt Engstrom	October 1, 2017	101	1.03 (Disney Channel); 0.72 (Disney Junior)
"Going Batty": Vee's family has moved to Pennsylvania where they become neighbors to the Peepleson family, but must hide their identities as vampires. Vee starts to uncontrollably turn into a bat as Demi and Gregoria work to keep her from exposing her identity to Poppy Peepleson. "Scare B&B": When Vee's family open the Scare B&B, they get guests in the form of the Peepleson family and the vampires Narcisa and Cosmina. Vee and Poppy work with Vee's parents to keep Edna from running into Narcisa and Cosmina.: Absent: Bridget; DVD releases: Vampirina: Volume 1: Meet The New Girl On The Block!
2	2	"The Sleepover"	Nicky Phelan	Chris Nee and Jeny Quine	Charlie Grosvenor	October 1, 2017	102	1.04 (Disney Channel); 0.71 (Disney Junior)
2	2	"Portrait of a Vampire"	Mårten Jönmark	Chelsea Beyl	Mireia Serra	October 1, 2017	102	1.04 (Disney Channel); 0.71 (Disney Junior)
"The Sleepover": Vee invites her new human friends over for a sleepover, but must maintain her cover as a normal girl to avoid scaring Bridget.: Absent: Edna; "Portrait of a Vampire": On Vee's first day of school, Vee keeps turning into a bat when her picture is taken as Poppy works to keep her vampire identity from being found out by Mr. Gore. DVD releases: Vampirina: Volume 1: Meet The New Girl On The Block!
3a	3a	"Vee's Surprise Party"	Norton Virgien	Jeffrey King	Allan Abelardo, Brian Hatfield	October 2, 2017	103	0.61
Vee invites her class over for a party full of spooky surprises. Absent: Edna DVD releases: Vampirina: Volume 1: Meet The New Girl On The Block!
3b	3b	"Vee Goes Viral"	Nicky Phelan	Chelsea Beyl	Tim Spillane	October 2, 2017	103	0.61
While trying to learn a new dance, Vee unknowingly teaches her friends a dance that gets the attention of a competitive ghoul, Dragos the Dancer, who challenges her to a dance-off. Absent: Oxana, Bridget, Edna and Mr. Gore “” Song: Livin in the scream DVD releases: Vampirina: Volume 1: Meet The New Girl On The Block!
4a	4a	"The Plant Predicament"	Ehud Landsberg	Jennifer Hamburg	John Flagg, Nondas Korodimos	October 6, 2017	104	0.82
Edna enters a Green Thumb Contest and accidentally plants some of Oxana's magical Transylvanian seeds. Absent: Boris, Bridget, Edgar and Mr. Gore DVD releases: Vampirina: Volume 1: Meet The New Girl On The Block!
4b	4b	"Mummy Mayhem"	Mårten Jönmark	S : Chelsea Beyl; T : Travis Braun	Jessica Toth	October 6, 2017	104	0.82
When Vee goes on a field trip to the Natural History Museum, she runs into an old family friend, King Pepi. DVD releases: Vampirina: Volume 1: Meet The New Girl On The Block!
5a	5a	"Little Terror"	Matt Engstrom	Chelsea Beyl	Vitaly Shafirov	October 9, 2017	105	0.82
Vee's Aunt Olga visits and leaves her daughter Nosferatu "Nosey" in her care. Vee and her friends volunteer to babysit Nosey, but she keeps making a mess of the place. Absent: Edgar, Edna and Mr. Gore
5b	5b	"Super Natural"	Mårten Jönmark	Travis Braun	Brian Hatfield	October 9, 2017	105	0.82
When a family of ghost hunters comes to stay at the Scare B&B, Vee and her family spend the day trying to prove that their house is not haunted. Absent: Poppy, Bridget, Edgar (mentioned), Edna and Mr. Gore
6a	6a	"Vamping Trip"	Ehud Landsberg	Jeffrey King	Brian Hatfield	October 13, 2017	106	0.88
Vee's family and the Peeplesons go on a camping trip. Absent: Bridget and Mr. Gore
6b	6b	"The Monster Snore"	Nicky Phelan	Karissa Valencia	Tad Butler	October 13, 2017	106	0.88
Oxana leaves a trail of special breadcrumbs for a visiting Snugglot named Matilda. Because Bridget walked on the breadcrumbs, Matilda follows them to Bridget's house and sleeps under her bed. Vee and Poppy must work to get Matilda to the Scare B&B without Edgar seeing her. Absent: Boris
7a	7a	"Bone Appetit"	Ehud Landsberg	S : Chelsea Beyl; T : Kerri Grant	Anna Margiotta	October 16, 2017	107	0.76
When a foody named Mr. Froufington comes to visit the hotel, Demi enlists the skeleton Chef Remy Bones to help prepare a meal for him, though some of his dishes come into conflict with the ones that are made by Poppy. Absent: Boris, Edgar, Edna and Mr. Gore
7b	7b	"Woodchuck Woodsies"	Mårten Jönmark	Kerri Grant	Nondas Korodimos	October 16, 2017	107	0.76
Vee joins the Woodchuck Woodsies that are led by Edna and has a hard time living up to the group's potentials. Absent: Oxana, Boris, Demi, Gregoria, Edgar and Mr. Gore
8a	8a	"Hide & Shriek"	Matt Engstrom	Travis Braun	Magnus Kravik	October 20, 2017	111	0.75
Vee invites her friends over for a game of "hide and shriek". Absent: Oxana, Boris, Edgar, Edna and Mr. Gore
8b	8b	"The Little Witch"	Mårten Jönmark	Chelsea Beyl	Brian Hatfield	October 20, 2017	111	0.75
The most famous witches in all of Transylvania come to stay at the Scare B&B with their adorable daughter, Phoebe, who enlists Vee's help to learn how to transform into a cat. Absent: Poppy, Bridget, Edgar, Edna and Mr. Gore
9a	9a	"Vampire Weekend"	Ehud Landsberg	Jeffrey King	Anna Margiotta	October 23, 2017	112	0.83
During a full moon, magic amulets cause Vee and Poppy to magically switch places and Vee transforms into a human and Poppy into a vampire. When Poppy's amulet goes missing, the girls have to find it before the switch becomes permanent. Absent: Bridget, Edgar, Edna and Mr. Gore DVD releases: Vampirina: Ghoul Girls Rock!
9b	9b	"The Bird Who Knew Too Much"	Matt Engstrom	Chelsea Beyl	Ansgar Niebuhr	October 23, 2017	112	0.83
When Vee and Poppy's class pet Kiwi the parrot comes to stay at the Scare B&B, she starts repeating everything about the Scare B&B. The girls have to stop Kiwi from exposing Vee's identity to Edgar while at the same time try to get Gregoria unstuck from the fence. Absent: Bridget and Mr. Gore (mentioned) DVD releases: Vampirina: Ghoul Girls Rock!
10a	10a	"The Ghoul Girls"	Mårten Jönmark	Chris Nee	Massimiliano Lucania	October 27, 2017	109	0.70
Vee's favorite band, The Scream Girls, comes to stay at the Scare B&B and help Vee and her friends overcome their stage fright when they decide to start their own band, the Ghoul Girls. Absent: Mr. Gore DVD releases: Vampirina: Ghoul Girls Rock!
10b	10b	"Game Night"	Matt Engstrom	Kerri Grant	Tobias Schwartz	October 27, 2017	109	0.70
Vee invites her friends over for family game night and teaches them her favorite Transylvanian game, Skelly Run. Absent: Demi (mentioned only), Gregoria, Edgar, Edna and Mr. Gore DVD releases: Vampirina: Ghoul Girls Rock!
11a	11a	"Oldie But a Ghouldie"	Ehud Landsberg	Travis Braun	Mireia Serra	November 3, 2017	113	0.70
When the family does some spring cleaning, Gregoria worries that she'll be thrown away. Absent: Oxana, Bridget, Edgar and Mr. Gore DVD releases: Vampirina: Ghoul Girls Rock!
11b	11b	"Beast in Show"	Mårten Jönmark	Melinda LaRose	Allan Abelardo	November 3, 2017	113	0.70
Vee enters Wolfie in the local dog show, but a treat with an ingredient that causes him to transform could expose the Hauntleys' identities. Absent: Edgar and Mr. Gore DVD releases: Vampirina: Ghoul Girls Rock!
12a	12a	"Critters!"	Ehud Landsberg	Karissa Valencia	Charlie Grosvenor	November 10, 2017	108	0.94
When a Critternarian arrives, Vee tries to help him look after a mysterious egg. Absent: Oxana (mentioned), Boris (mentioned), Poppy, Bridget, Edgar, Edna and Mr. Gore
12b	12b	"Cuddle Monster"	Mårten Jönmark	Travis Braun	Jessica Toth	November 10, 2017	108	0.94
A cuddle monster staying at the Scare B&B wants to learn scaring techniques from Vee. Absent: Edgar, Edna and Mr. Gore
13a	13a	"Batty Fever"	Ehud Landsberg; Matt Engstrom	Jeffrey King	Micha Cohen	November 17, 2017	116	0.73
When Vee, Boris, and Oxana come down with the Batty Fever that traps them in their bat forms, Demi and Gregoria must work together to whip up a cure for them. Absent: Poppy (mentioned), Bridget, Edgar, Edna and Mr. Gore
13b	13b	"Poetry Day"	Mårten Jönmark	Jennifer Hamburg	Jonathan Hashiloni	November 17, 2017	116	0.73
Bridget does not have a poem for Poetry Day, so Vee tries to help her out. When Vee ends up giving Bridget a book of spells by mistake, she must get it back before Bridget reads from it. Absent: Gregoria
14a	14a	"Nanpire the Great"	Ehud Landsberg	Jeffery King	Brian Hatfield	December 1, 2017	110	0.94
Vee's grandmother, Nanpire, visits from Transylvania and helps her cook a traditional vampire dish for the class potluck. Absent: Edgar and Edna DVD releases: Disney Junior Holiday
14b	14b	"Two Heads Are Better Than One"	Matt Engstrom	Travis Braun	Robin French	December 1, 2017	110	0.94
Vee holds a Friendship Festival with Demi, Gregoria, Poppy, and Bridget. When a family of two-headed monsters checks in, Vee has the two-headed monster Hornadette and Shrieka join in as well, but both heads have opposite interests. Absent: Boris, Nanpire, Edgar, Edna and Mr. Gore DVD releases: Disney Junior Holiday
15a	15a	"Vee Is for Valentine"	Mårten Jönmark	Chelsea Beyl	Kwabena Sarfo	January 12, 2018	114	0.87
Vee tries to celebrate Valentine's Day and Ghoulentine's Day but mixes up her cards. Absent: Nanpire and Edna
15b	15b	"Scarestitute Teacher"	Ehud Landsberg	Jeffery King	Wickus Cotzee	January 12, 2018	114	0.87
When Mr. Gore needs a substitute teacher, Oxana decides to step in. Absent: Boris, Nanpire and Edna
16a	16a	"Look Who's Scared Now!"	Matt Engstrom	S : Chris Nee; T : Melinda LaRose	Tobias Schwartz	February 16, 2018	118	0.73
Vee and her family get scared during the town's anniversary celebrations. Absent: Nanpire and Ms. Fincher
16b	16b	"Dust Bunnies"	Mårten Jönmark	Travis Braun	Magnus Kravik	February 16, 2018	118	0.73
It is time to give the house its one-hundred year clean. While her parents leave to buy some cleaning accessories, Vee and her friends are left to clean the house. Demi tries to use magic to clean the house faster, but instead conjures up Dust Bunnies, who begin to wreak havoc. Absent: Poppy, Bridget, Edgar, Edna, Mr. Gore and Ms. Fincher
17a	17a	"Vampirina Ballerina"	Mårten Jönmark	Chelsea Beyl	Dan Nosella	March 16, 2018	122	0.79
Vee gets stage fright during a ballet performance. Absent: Nanpire and Ms. Fincher DVD releases: Vampirina: Ghoul Girls Rock!
17b	17b	"Treasure Haunters"	Leigh Fieldhouse and Ehud Landsberg	Travis Braun	Leigh Fieldhouse	March 16, 2018	122	0.79
Bridget's bracelet has gone missing, and Vee and her friends help a ghost pirate search for treasure so that he can be freed from a haunted map. Soon, they found Bridget's jewellery as she thanked him. Absent: Oxana, Boris, Nanpire, Edgar (mentioned), Edna, Mr. Gore and Ms. Fincher DVD releases: Vampirina: Ghoul Girls Rock!
18a	18a	"Mummy's Day"	Mårten Jönmark	S : Chris Nee; T : Melinda LaRose	Brian Hatfield	April 27, 2018	121	0.70
When Mary-Margaret Mummyton visits the Scare B&B for Mummy's Day, Vee insists that Oxana take the day off and join her for a relaxing day at the spooky spa. Absent: Nanpire, Bridget, Edgar, Edna, Mr. Gore and Ms. Fincher
18b	18b	"Dancelvania"	Ehud Landsberg	Travis Braun	Jonathan Hashiloni	April 27, 2018	121	0.70
Vee hosts a dance party at the Scare B&B to celebrate her favorite Transylvanian holiday, Dancelvania Day. Absent: Nanpire, Edna, Mr. Gore and Ms. Fincher
19a	19a	"Acrobat Boris"	Ehud Landsberg	Chelsea Beyl	Wickus Cotzee, Darren Taylor, and John Flagg	June 15, 2018	117	0.62
Boris gets an invitation to reunite with the Scare-Devils, an acrobatic flying troupe. Absent: Nanpire (mentioned), Poppy, Bridget, Edgar, Edna, Mr. Gore and Ms. Fincher
19b	19b	"The Lemonade Stand"	Mårten Jönmark	Jennifer Hamburg	Massimilano Lucania, Brian Hatfield	June 15, 2018	117	0.62
With a little help from Chef Remy, Vee and Poppy run an irresistible lemonade stand. Absent: Nanpire and Ms. Fincher
20a	20a	"Hiccupire"	Mårten Jönmark	Jeffrey King	Micha Cohen	July 20, 2018	124	0.612
When Vee gets a case of the vampire hiccups, Poppy and Bridget struggle to find a way to scare them away. Absent: Nanpire, Edna and Ms. Fincher
20b	20b	"Uncle Bigfoot"	Ehud Landsberg	Jeffrey King	Anna Margiotta	July 20, 2018	124	0.61
Boris' old friend Bob Bigfoot comes to the Scare B&B. While accommodations are made so that nobody can see him, Vee and Poppy must also keep Edgar from discovering him. Absent: Nanpire, Bridget, Edna, Mr. Gore and Ms. Fincher
21a	21a	"Fangless"	Mårten Jönmark	S : Chris Nee; T : Kent Redeker	Massimilano Lucania	July 27, 2018	120	0.63
After losing her fangs at school, Vee worries that she is becoming more human than vampire. Her parents comfort her and explain that the Fang Fairy will deliver her grownup fangs if she puts her baby fangs under her pillow. Vee realizes she will always be Vee, whether she has fangs or not. Absent: Nanpire, Edna and Ms. Fincher
21b	21b	"Transylvanian Tea"	Ehud Landsberg	Karissa Valencia	Charlie Grosvenor	July 27, 2018	120	0.63
Nanpire passes down the family tea party tradition to Vee. Absent: Edgar, Edna, Mr. Gore and Ms. Fincher
22	22	"Home Scream Home"	Nicky Phelan	Chris Nee	Nondas Korodimos	August 3, 2018	115	0.61
Vee's parents surprise her with a vacation to their former home in Transylvania so that the Ghoul Girls can enter a talent contest, which the Scream Girls are also entered in. Her friends Poppy and Bridget are invited as well. An unscrupulous competitor, Poltergeist Pat, locks the Scream Girls in a dungeon so that they cannot sing, giving him a better chance to win. Vee, Demi and Gregoria save the Scream Girls, who perform in the show and invite the Ghoul Girls to perform with them, to the delight of the audience. Absent: Nanpire (mentioned), Edgar, Edna, Mr. Gore and Ms. Fincher DVD releases: Vampirina: Ghoul Girls Rock!
23a	23a	"Countess Vee"	Nicky Phelan	Chelsea Beyl	Brian Hatfield	August 24, 2018	123	0.62
Vee trains to become a countess after being named heir to Spookelton Castle in Transylvania. Absent: Nanpire, Edgar, Edna, Mr. Gore and Ms. Fincher DVD releases: Vampirina: Ghoul Girls Rock! Note: Vee is revealed to be 2 centuries old, which is indicated that she's 200 years old.
23b	23b	"Frights, Camera, Action!"	Mårten Jönmark	S : Jeffrey King; T : Steve Sobel	Nondas Korodimos	August 24, 2018	123	0.62
Vee helps Edgar film a spooky monster movie for the school film festival. Absent: Nanpire, Edna and Ms. Fincher DVD releases: Vampirina: Ghoul Girls Rock!
24a	24a	"Hauntleyween"	Ehud Landsberg	Travis Braun	Nico Selma and Wickus Cotzee	October 1, 2018	119	0.51
Vee helps prepare the house for the family's first Hauntleyween; the family worries about its secret getting out. Absent: Nanpire, Mr. Gore and Ms. Fincher
24b	24b	"Frankenflower"	Mårten Jönmark	Steve Sobel	Mireia Serra	October 1, 2018	119	0.51
Vee doesn't know what to make for the inventor fair. Gregoria suggests an invention that can bring dead flowers back to life; it works but not quite as expected. Absent: Nanpire, Ms. Fincher and Ms. Meyer
25a	25a	"Nanpire and Grandpop the Greats"	Nicky Phelan	Jeffrey King	Kwabena Sarfo	November 23, 2018	125	0.72
Nanpire and Grandpop come to visit Vee and her family in Pennsylvania for the Blood Moon Festival and learn about some human holiday traditions. Absent: Bridget, Mr. Gore, Ms. Fincher and Ms. Meyer DVD releases: Disney Junior Holiday
25b	25b	"There's Snow Place Like Home"	Mårten Jönmark and Ehud Landsberg	Chelsea Beyl	Wickus Cotzee	November 23, 2018	125	0.72
When Vee doesn't get the snow day she was hoping for, Demi casts a spell to help cheer her up. Absent: Nanpire, Grandpop, Bridget, Edgar, Mr. Gore, Ms. Fincher and Ms. Meyer DVD releases: Disney Junior Holiday

=== Season 2 (2018–20) ===
No. overall	No. in season	Title	Directed by	Written by	Storyboard by	Original release date	Prod. code	US viewers (millions)
26a	1a	"Vampire for President"	Mårten Jönmark and Ehud Landsberg	Chelsea Beyl	Brian Hatfield	December 7, 2018	202	0.40
Vee decides to run for class president, but Poppy is running as well. Vee suggests good ideas as a candidate, such as setting up a haunted house for a school fundraiser, but Poppy's ideas include having a school mascot, and she has a better showy campaign. Vee wants to drop out of the race due to her scary pins, bad photo, and poor campaigning, but Poppy realizes that fundraising to help a school is more important than a mascot, and chooses Vee as the new class president. Absent: Nanpire, Grandpop, Edna, Ms. Fincher and Ms. Meyer
26b	1b	"Where's Wolfie?"	Maeve Garvan	S : Travis Braun; T : Melinda LaRose	Wickus Cotzee	December 7, 2018	202	0.40
Poppy wants a pet bunny, but first she has to show her mom she is ready to have a pet by looking after Wolfie. Absent: Nanpire, Grandpop, Bridget, Mr. Gore, Ms. Fincher and Ms. Meyer
27a	2a	"The Woodsie Way"	Mårten Jönmark and Ehud Landsberg	Chelsea Beyl	Marco Piersma	January 11, 2019	203	0.43
Vee and her friends go on their first hiking trip with the Woodchuck Woodsies and she tries to lead a hike without her usual powers. Absent: Oxana, Boris, Nanpire, Grandpop, Gregoria, Edgar, Mr. Gore, Ms. Fincher and Ms. Meyer
27b	2b	"TNN"	Pete McEvoy	S : Chris Nee and Travis Braun; T : Jeffrey King	Micha Cohen and Matt Engstrom	January 11, 2019	203	0.43
One of Vee's oldest friends from Transylvania, Frankie Bolt, comes to visit her in Pennsylvania as she does a news report for Transylvania News Network that challenges her beliefs on humans. Absent: Nanpire, Grandpop, Edna, Ms. Fincher and Ms. Meyer
28a	3a	"Franken-Wedding"	Mårten Jönmark and Ehud Landsberg	Travis Braun	Jose Cerro	February 1, 2019	201	0.55
Frankenstein and the Bride of Frankenstein hold their wedding at the Hauntley’s Scare B&B and give Vee a very important job. Absent: Nanpire, Grandpop, Edgar, Edna, Mr. Gore, Ms. Fincher and Ms. Meyer
28b	3b	"Bat Hair Day"	Matt Engstrom	Travis Braun	Jonathan Hashiloni	February 1, 2019	201	0.55
Gregoria's sculpture of the Hauntley family is almost ruined when Vee wakes up with a Bat Hair Day. Absent: Nanpire, Grandpop, Edgar, Edna, Mr. Gore, Ms. Fincher and Ms. Meyer
29a	4a	"Baby Dragon"	Mårten Jönmark and Ehud Landsberg	Travis Braun	Jose Guzman	February 22, 2019	205	0.33
A baby dragon visits the Hauntley's and takes a special liking to Gregoria. Absent: Oxana (mentioned), Boris (mentioned), Grandpop (mentioned), Poppy, Bridget, Edgar, Edna, Mr. Gore, Ms. Fincher and Ms. Meyer
29b	4b	"Gloomates"	Matteo Ceccotti	S : Chris Nee; T : Jeffrey King	Brian Hatfield	February 22, 2019	205	0.33
When the Hauntley house becomes infested with Charmer bugs, Edna insists the entire family stay with her while the house is being fumigated. Absent: Nanpire, Grandpop, Mr. Gore, Ms. Fincher and Ms. Meyer
30a	5a	"The Ghoul Next Door"	Pete McEvoy	Jeffrey King	Samm Lee	March 8, 2019	206	0.40
Vee, Poppy and Edgar get new neighbors, and Vee begins to suspect their son is a vampire. Absent: Nanpire, Grandpop, Mr. Gore (mentioned), Ms. Fincher and Ms. Meyer
30b	5b	"The Scare B & Vee"	Leigh Fieldhouse and Maeve Garvan	Jennifer Hamburg	Jose Guzman	March 8, 2019	206	0.40
While her parents are away, Vee volunteers to be in charge of running the Scare B&B, but the intended guests turn out to be humans. Absent: Nanpire, Grandpop, Edgar, Edna, Mr. Gore, Ms. Fincher and Ms. Meyer
31a	6a	"The Birthday Broom"	Pete McEvoy	Chelsea Beyl	Robin French	March 15, 2019	204	0.56
Vee is gifted a Hover Haunt Spook-Thousand broom on her first birthday in Pennsylvania as her friends try to get her a good gift in Transylvania. Absent: Nanpire (mentioned), Grandpop, Edgar, Edna, Mr. Gore, Ms. Fincher and Ms. Meyer
31b	6b	"Vee Takes the Court"204	Norton Virgien	Stuart Friedel	Fernando Yache	March 15, 2019	204	0.56
Vee volunteers to sub in on Poppy's basketball team to help win the final game and inclusively learns a lesson about sportsmanship. Absent: Nanpire, Grandpop, Ms. Fincher and Ms. Meyer
32a	7a	"Scare-itage Day"	Mårten Jönmark	Chelsea Beyl	Micha Cohen	March 22, 2019	TBA	0.37
Family Heritage Day is coming up at school, and Vee is excited to make a family tree. Absent: Ms. Fincher and Ms. Meyer
32b	7b	"The Great Egg Scramble"	Pete McEvoy	Travis Braun	Brian Hatfield	March 22, 2019	TBA	0.37
Vee's first Easter egg hunt turns into a rescue mission after a baby dragon egg accidentally gets mixed in with the other eggs. Absent: Nanpire, Grandpop, Mr. Gore, Ms. Fincher and Ms. Meyer
33a	8a	"Desserter Mystery"	Mårten Jönmark	Jeffrey King	Fernando Yache	April 12, 2019	TBA	0.33
The Hauntleys travel to Spookelton castle to celebrate Nanpire's birthday, and Vee makes her a special cake, but the cake disappears and they must find out what happened to it. Absent: Poppy, Bridget, Edgar, Edna, Mr. Gore, Ms. Fincher and Ms. Meyer
33b	8b	"Mirror Mirror"	Pete McEvoy	Karissa Valencia	Brant Moon	April 12, 2019	TBA	0.33
When Vee starts to feel overwhelmed by all she has to do, Demi introduces her to a magic mirror that can create duplicates of herself. Absent: Nanpire, Grandpop, Mr. Gore, Ms. Fincher and Ms. Meyer
34a	9a	"Beach Night"	Pete McEvoy	Stuart Friedel	Brant Moon	June 21, 2019	TBA	0.44
When the Hauntleys accidentally leave their special sunblock at home during a trip to the beach with the Peeplesons, they try to delay the trip so they can have a beach night instead. Absent: Nanpire, Grandpop, Bridget, Mr. Gore, Ms. Fincher and Ms. Meyer
34b	9b	"Gregoria Takes Flight"	Matteo Ceccotti and Jean Herlihy	S : Travis Braun; T : Jeffrey King	David De Rooij	June 21, 2019	TBA	0.44
Vee and Demi help Gregoria learn how to fly. Absent: Nanpire, Grandpop, Poppy, Bridget, Edgar, Edna, Mr. Gore, Ms. Fincher and Ms. Meyer
35a	10a	"The Big Bite"	Pete McEvoy	Ariel Shepherd-Oppenheim	Brian Hatfield	June 28, 2019	TBA	0.49
Absent: Nanpire, Grandpop, Poppy (mentioned), Bridget (mentioned), Edgar (mentioned), Edna, Ms. Fincher and Ms. Meyer
35b	10b	"Ghost Hosts"	Mårten Jönmark and Ehud Landsberg	Alex Fox & Rachel Lewis	David De Rooij	June 28, 2019	TBA	0.49
Absent: Boris, Nanpire, Grandpop, Gregoria, Mr. Gore, Ms. Fincher and Ms. Meyer
36a	11a	"The Boo Boys Are Back"	Leigh Fieldhouse and Jean Herlihy	S : Chris Nee; T : Chelsea Beyl	Wickus Cotzee	July 12, 2019	TBA	0.48
Poltergeist Pat steals the Ghoul Girls' newest song and they must work to create another before it's their turn. Absent: Nanpire, Grandpop, Edgar, Edna, Mr. Gore, Ms. Fincher and Ms. Meyer
36b	11b	"Pixie Problem"	Pete McEvoy	Karissa Valencia	Brian Hatfield	July 12, 2019	TBA	0.48
Vee uses a spell to shrink herself and her friends so they can play with a visiting pixie, but she cannot find a way to return them to normal. Absent: Boris (mentioned), Nanpire, Grandpop, Mr. Gore, Ms. Fincher and Ms. Meyer
37a	12a	"Face the Music"	Pete McEvoy	S : Melinda LaRose; T : Jennifer Hamburg	Kwabena Sarfo	July 26, 2019	TBA	0.53
Vee cannot bring herself to tell her friends she cannot perform an intense spookylele solo in the song Poppy writes for the Ghoul Girls to perform in the school talent show. Absent: Nanpire, Grandpop, Edna, Ms. Fincher and Ms. Meyer
37b	12b	"Fright at the Museum"	Jean Herlihy and Matteo Ceccotti	Travis Braun	Wickus Cotzee	July 26, 2019	TBA	0.53
Absent: Nanpire, Grandpop, Edgar, Edna (mentioned), Ms. Fincher and Ms. Meyer
38a	13a	"Vamp-iversary"	Mårten Jönmark	Travis Braun	Jose Guzman	August 9, 2019	TBA	0.54
On Oxana's birthday, Vee travels to Transylvania to find the perfect gift for them. Absent: Nanpire, Grandpop, Poppy, Bridget, Edgar, Edna, Mr. Gore, Ms. Fincher and Ms. Meyer
38b	13b	"The Wolf Boy"	Pete McEvoy	Mercedes Valle	Jose Guzman	August 9, 2019	TBA	0.54
Absent: Nanpire, Grandpop, Edna, Mr. Gore, Ms. Fincher and Ms. Meyer
39a	14a	"Bat Got Your Tongue"	Mårten Jönmark	Jeffrey King	Wickus Cotzee	August 16, 2019	TBA	0.50
Vee loses her voice after too many rehearsals right before her band is to perform, and she must speak the truth so she can sing again. Absent: Edgar, Edna, Mr. Gore, Ms. Fincher and Ms. Meyer
39b	14b	"The Haunted Theater"	Jean Herlihy	Karissa Valencia	Jonathan Hashiloni	August 16, 2019	TBA	0.50
Vee and her friends visit a theater that is rumored to be haunted. Absent: Oxana, Boris, Nanpire, Grandpop, Gregoria, Edna, Ms. Fincher and Ms. Meyer
40a	15a	"Trick or Treaters"	Mårten Jönmark	Travis Braun	Kwabena Sarfo	October 4, 2019	TBA	0.43
The Hauntleys' Halloween takes a strange turn when Demi accidentally gives some of Chef Remy's dragon taffies to the trick-or-treaters. Absent: Nanpire, Grandpop, Mr. Gore, Ms. Fincher and Ms. Meyer
40b	15b	"Play It Again Vee"	Pete McEvoy	Lisa Kettle	Wickus Cotzee	October 4, 2019	TBA	0.43
To prevent her project from getting destroyed, Vee uses a spell to go through the same day over and over again. Absent: Nanpire, Grandpop, Poppy, Bridget, Edgar, Edna, Mr. Gore, Ms. Fincher and Ms. Meyer
41a	16a	"Jumping Jack-o-Lanterns"	Pete McEvoy	Chelsea Beyl	Samantha Suyi Lee	October 11, 2019	TBA	0.39
Vee and Oxana grow pumpkins for a school project, but Vee disobeys her advice and accidentally makes one of them grow nonstop. Absent: Nanpire, Grandpop, Edna, Ms. Fincher and Ms. Meyer
41b	16b	"Freeze Our Guest"	Mårten Jönmark	S : Travis Braun; T : Lisa Kettle	David Frasquet	October 11, 2019	TBA	0.39
Absent: Nanpire, Grandpop, Poppy (mentioned), Bridget, Edgar, Edna, Mr. Gore, Ms. Fincher and Ms. Meyer
42a	17a	"The Vamp-Opera"	Mårten Jönmark	Chris Nee	Kwabena Sarfo	October 18, 2019	TBA	0.31
When Vee attempts to use a hybrid spell to help with her writer's block, she accidentally puts the world under a Sung-through musical spell and has to find a way to break the curse. Absent: Nanpire, Grandpop and Ms. Meyer
42b	17b	"This Haunted House Is Closed"	Mårten Jönmark	Chelsea Beyl	Fiona Ryan	October 18, 2019	TBA	0.31
Absent: Nanpire, Grandpop, Poppy, Bridget, Edgar, Edna, Mr. Gore, Ms. Fincher and Ms. Meyer
43a	18a	"Dia de los Muertos (Day of the Dead)"	Mårten Jönmark and Ehud Landsberg	S : Chris Nee; T : Jorge R. Gutierrez and Doug Langdale	Fernando Yache	October 25, 2019	TBA	0.46
A family of calacas visit the Scare B&B and teach the Hauntleys about Day of the Dead. Absent: Nanpire, Grandpop, Poppy, Bridget, Edgar, Edna, Mr. Gore, Ms. Fincher and Ms. Meyer
43b	18b	"As You Wish"	Pete McEvoy	Karissa Valencia	Robin French	October 25, 2019	TBA	0.46
Chef Remy bakes special cupcakes that grant wishes to whoever eats it, and Vee's identity is threatened when Edgar gets his hands on one. Absent: Oxana (mentioned), Boris (mentioned), Nanpire, Grandpop, Edna (mentioned), Mr. Gore, Ms. Fincher and Ms. Meyer
44a	19a	"The Scare Council"	Mårten Jönmark	Chelsea Beyl	Kwabena Sarfo	November 1, 2019	TBA	0.38
Boris is named head of the Transylvania Scare Council, but the members reject his park idea until Vee comes in. Absent: Oxana (mentioned), Nanpire (mentioned), Grandpop, Poppy, Bridget, Edgar, Edna, Mr. Gore, Ms. Fincher and Ms. Meyer
44b	19b	"Taking Scare of Business"	Pete McEvoy	Chelsea Beyl	Samantha Suyi Lee	November 1, 2019	TBA	0.38
Vee and her friends help Demi complete his list of unfinished business so he can go to Haunteray Bay. Absent: Nanpire, Grandpop, Edgar, Edna, Mr. Gore, Ms. Fincher and Ms. Meyer
45a	20a	"Hauntley Girls"	Pete McEvoy	Jeffrey King	Brian Hatfield	November 22, 2019	TBA	0.33
Absent: Boris, Nanpire, Grandpop, Edgar, Mr. Gore, Ms. Fincher and Ms. Meyer
45b	20b	"The Not So Haunted House"	Mårten Jönmark	Jennifer Hamburg	Jose Guzman	November 22, 2019	TBA	0.33
Poppy thinks her house is being sold, so Vee and the gang try to make her house appear haunted. Absent: Oxana (mentioned), Boris, Nanpire, Grandpop, Bridget, Edgar, Briana, Mr. Gore, Ms. Fincher and Ms. Meyer
46a	21a	"A Gargoyle Carol"	Norton Virgien	Chelsea Beyl	Fernando Yache	November 30, 2019	TBA	0.62
Absent: Nanpire, Grandpop, Poppy (mentioned), Bridget (mentioned), Edgar (mentioned), Briana, Mr. Gore, Ms. Fincher and Ms. Meyer
46b	21b	"Deliver-Eek!"	Mårten Jönmark	Jeffrey King	Josh Taback	November 30, 2019	TBA	0.62
Absent: Nanpire, Grandpop, Bridget, Briana, Mr. Gore, Ms. Fincher and Ms. Meyer
47a	22a	"The Great Esmeralda"	Maeve Garvan and Matt Engstrom	S : Travis Braun; T : Jennifer Hamburg	David Frasquet	January 17, 2020	TBA	0.37
A visiting fortune teller predicts Vee will "lose a friend", and she believes it's her friendship with Poppy. Absent: Nanpire, Grandpop, Bridget, Edgar, Edna, Briana, Mr. Gore, Ms. Fincher and Ms. Meyer
47b	22b	"Frog's Breath"	Jean Herlihy	Karissa Valencia	Samantha Suyi Lee	January 17, 2020	TBA	0.37
A potion gone wrong turns Vee into a frog and is found by Edgar. Absent: Oxana, Boris, Nanpire, Grandpop, Bridget, Briana, Mr. Gore (mentioned), Ms. Fincher and Ms. Meyer
48a	23a	"Oh Brother"	Pete McEvoy	Karissa Valencia	Jonathan Hashiloni	February 21, 2020	TBA	0.27
Gregoria's soft and sweet brother Hugo visits the Scare B&B, and Gregoria is jealous when he gets all the attention. Absent: Nanpire, Grandpop, Poppy, Bridget, Edgar, Edna, Briana, Mr. Gore, Ms. Fincher and Ms. Meyer
48b	23b	"The Search for Bigfoot"	Mårten Jönmark	Jeffrey King	Kwabena Sarfo	February 21, 2020	TBA	0.27
When Uncle Bob misses check in, Vee sets Edgar, Bigfoot's biggest fan, out to find him. Absent: Nanpire, Grandpop, Edna, Briana, Mr. Gore, Ms. Fincher and Ms. Meyer
49a	24a	"Au Revoir Remy"	Pete McEvoy	Jeffrey King	David Frasquet	March 27, 2020	TBA	0.43
Remy says "au revoir" to the Hauntleys so he can become head chef at the Catacomb Café. Absent: Nanpire, Grandpop, Poppy, Bridget, Edgar, Edna, Briana, Mr. Gore, Ms. Fincher and Ms. Meyer
49b	24b	"The School Scare Fair"	Mårten Jönmark	S : Chris Nee; T : Jennifer Hamburg	David Frasquet	March 27, 2020	TBA	0.43
Oxana is put in charge of Vee's school fair, but makes it too scary for the visitors. Absent: Nanpire, Grandpop, Briana, Ms. Fincher and Ms. Meyer
50	25	"Ghoul Guides Save the Day!"	Pete McEvoy	Chris Nee	Josh Taback	April 10, 2020	TBA	0.43
When Edgar crashes the annual Ghoul Guides Extravaganza vamping trip in Transylvania, Vee and the girls must come clean about Vee's family. An excited Edgar reassures them that he will not tell anyone about the world of monsters. Absent: Nanpire, Grandpop, Briana, Mr. Gore, Ms. Fincher and Ms. Meyer

=== Season 3 (2020–21) ===
No. overall	No. in season	Title	Directed by	Written by	Storyboard by	Original release date	Prod. code	US viewers (millions)
51a	1a	"Weekly Normalness"	Jean Herlihy	Jeffrey King	Wickus Cotzee	October 5, 2020	TBA	0.34
Edgar decides to move Weekly Weirdness to the Monster World Wide Web, but finds the viewers aren't interested in his videos. Absent: Bridget (mentioned)
51b	1b	"Vampire's Luck"	Matt Engstrom	Chelsea Beyl	Karim Gouyette	October 5, 2020	TBA	0.34
Nanpire gives Vee a ghoul luck charm to help her with her ballet recital, but it gives the others bad luck.
52a	2a	"A Key for Vee"	Seamus O'Toole	Chelsea Beyl	Jonathan Hashiloni	October 6, 2020	TBA	0.28
Vee and her friends follow a set of clues to unlock secret rooms in the Scare B&B. Absent: Edgar
52b	2b	"Art Galler-Eek!"	Norton Virgien	Mia Resella	Charles Grosvenor	October 6, 2020	TBA	0.28
Poppy gets her pictures on display at the Monstropolitan Museum of Art, but when trying to get attention, she makes a huge mess.
53a	3a	"A Ghoulish Tour"	Maeve Garvan	Jeffrey King	David Frasquet	October 7, 2020	TBA	0.36
When the Ghoul Girls go on tour with the Scream Girls, Vee becomes homesick and messes up the gigs. Absent: Edgar
53b	3b	"Training Wings"	Alan Moran	S : Jeffrey King; T : Jennifer Hamburg	Wickus Cotzee	October 7, 2020	TBA	0.36
Vee wants to learn to ride a bike for the Penn-Cycle-Vania festival, but finds the hobby easier said than done. Absent: Edgar
54a	4a	"Nosy's Day In"	Alan Moran	Mia Resella	Jose Guzman	October 8, 2020	TBA	0.33
Nosy gets into wild mischief when Vee babysits her, and she and her friends must catch her before Oxana and Olga notice. Absent: Edgar
54b	4b	"Sincerely, Blobby"	Maeve Garvan	S : Jeffrey King; T : Jennifer Hamburg	Ilenia Gennari	October 8, 2020	TBA	0.33
Vee arranges for Demi's old friend Blobby to visit, but he keeps making a slimy mess. Absent: Poppy, Bridget, Edgar
55a	5a	"Double Double Halloween Trouble"	Matt Engstrom	Mia Resella	Jose Guzman	October 9, 2020	TBA	N/A
Vee tries to go trick-or-treating and attend the Transylvania Boneyard Banquet on the same day.
55b	5b	"The Creepover"	Seamus O'Toole	S : Jeffrey King; T : Melinda LaRose	Wickus Cotzee	October 9, 2020	TBA	N/A
Vee invites Frankie Bolt and her friends over for a Transylvanian "creepover" which exceeds Bridget's fear tolerance. Absent: Edgar
56a	6a	"Phantom of the Auditorium"	Seamus O'Toole	Mia Resella	David Frasquet	October 12, 2020	TBA	N/A
The Ghoul Girls discover a phantom who is afraid of showing his face to everyone.
56b	6b	"Memor-Eek!"	Alan Moran	Jeffrey King	Denzel De Meerleer	October 12, 2020	TBA	N/A
Demi casts a spell to make Edgar forget he met Vee and it affects Poppy as well. Absent: Bridget
57a	7a	"Weekend with Granpop"	Maeve Garvan	Chelsea Beyl	Wickus Cotzee	October 13, 2020	TBA	N/A
Grandpop comes to babysit Vee but has a hard time doing human things. Absent: Edgar
57b	7b	"Haunted House Call"	Seamus O'Toole	Jeffrey King	Jonathan Hashiloni	October 13, 2020	TBA	N/A
When Demi catches the flu and gets stuck in the Hauntleys' TV, the family must find out how to free him. Absent: Poppy, Bridget (mentioned), Edgar
58a	8a	"The Critter Fair"	Alan Moran	Karissa Valencia	Brian Hatfield	October 14, 2020	TBA	N/A
Vee and her friends volunteer at the Transylvania Critter Fair, but Edgar wishes his chosen pet can do cool things.
58b	8b	"Mirror Monster"	Seamus O'Toole	Ariel Shepherd-Oppenheim	Denzel De Meerleer	October 14, 2020	TBA	N/A
A visiting mirror monster starts copying everything Vee and her friends do. Absent: Edgar
59a	9a	"Bust Friends"	Alan Moran	Lisa Kettle	Samantha Suyi Lee	October 15, 2020	TBA	N/A
The Hauntleys are given a bust by Edna who threatens Vee's identity during a walking tour of Pennsylvania. Absent: Bridget, Edgar
59b	9b	"The Invisible Fan"	Seamus O'Toole	S : Chelsea Beyl; T : Karissa Valencia	David Frasquet	October 15, 2020	TBA	N/A
A shy ghost named Eerie Mae visits the Scare B&B but is too nervous to meet the Ghoul Girls.
60a	10a	"Remy's Recipe"	Alan Moran	Chelsea Beyl	Ilenia Gennari	October 16, 2020	TBA	N/A
Edgar decides to film Chef Remy's cooking for Weekly Weirdness, but Remy gets stage fright and keeps ruining the takes. Absent: Bridget
60b	10b	"Vampire Chaperone"	Maeve Garvan	Mia Resella	Brian Hatfield	October 16, 2020	TBA	N/A
Boris volunteers for Vee's nature walk but she is disappointed when he doesn't do what they used to do.
61a	11a	"Fang Ten!"	Maeve Garvan	Mia Resella	Jose Guzman	October 19, 2020	TBA	N/A
Vee insists Oxana teach her how to surf and discovers the consequences of learning so quickly. Absent: Poppy, Bridget, Edgar
61b	11b	"Science Rocks"	Seamus O'Toole	Stuart Friedel	Brian Hatfield	October 19, 2020	TBA	N/A
Vee makes special rock candy and tries to find out the secret to how it tastes good.
62a	12a	"Aw, Shucks"	Seamus O'Toole	S : Jeff King; T : Kent Redeker	David Frasquet	October 20, 2020	TBA	N/A
The Hauntleys hire a scarecrow to help with their Monstro-Crow problem, but he can do anything but scare. Absent: Edgar
62b	12b	"Family Scareloom"	Alan Moran	Michael Kooman & Christopher Dimond	Cristina Menghi	October 20, 2020	TBA	N/A
Vee accidentally destroys a family heirloom and does not want to tell Nanpire. Absent: Edgar
63a	13a	"Chrysalis Amiss"	Maeve Garvan	S : Sindy Boveda Spackman; T : Karissa Valencia	Jonathan Hashiloni	October 21, 2020	TBA	N/A
A Transylvanian caterpillar gets loose at Vee's school and eats everything. Absent: Boris, Gregoria,
63b	13b	"Bringing Down the House"	Alan Moran	Jennifer Hamburg	Samantha Suyi Lee	October 21, 2020	TBA	N/A
When struggling with a Ghoul Girls performance, Vee gets a fortune that it will "bring down the house". Absent: Edgar
64a	14a	"Bat to the Future"	Seamus O'Toole	Jeffrey King	Ilenia Gennari	October 22, 2020	TBA	N/A
When Vee uses Esmeralda's crystal ball to predict the future, trouble soon ensues.
64b	14b	"Gregoria Gets Down!"	Alan Moran	Lisa Kettle	Massimiliano Lucania	October 22, 2020	TBA	N/A
Vee and Demi help Gregoria train for the Monster Bop dance contest. Absent: Poppy, Bridget, Edgar
65a	15a	"Vee and the Family Stone"	Alan Moran	Stuart Friedel	David Frasquet	October 23, 2020	TBA	N/A
Vee and the gang are excited to model Medusa's fashion line but are upset when she chooses the style for them. Absent: Bridget, Edgar
65b	15b	"Twin Trouble"	Anna Margiotta	Karissa Valencia	Todd Waterman	October 23, 2020	TBA	N/A
Poppy and Edgar's shared birthday goes awry when they use Vee's spooky sparkler to wish for the parties they want.
66a	16a	"Bora the Banshee"	Maeve Garvan	Roxy Simons	Jose Guzman	October 25, 2020	TBA	N/A
A famous Transylvanian reporter comes to the Scare B&B to interview the Ghoul Girls, and they try to do their best to impress her. Absent: Edgar
66b	16b	"A Tale of Two Hollows"	Alan Moran	Mia Resella	Brian Hatfield	October 25, 2020	TBA	N/A
A spa weekend is threatened by Ichabod Crane and the Headless Horseman's constant feuding. Absent: Edgar
67a	17a	"The Fright Before Christmas"	Alan Moran	Jeffrey King	Jonathan Hashiloni	November 30, 2020	TBA	N/A
Vampirina plans a Spooky scare in the hopes of attracting Spooky Claus so that her family can enjoy a festive Transylvanian Christmas. Absent: Poppy, Bridget, Edgar
67b	17b	"Scared Snowman"	Shobhit Trivedi	Ariel Shepherd-Oppenheim	Charles Grosvenor and Irene Martini	November 30, 2020	TBA	N/A
When the Abominable Snowman arrives at Scare B&B after a big snowstorm, Vee and her friends help him overcome some of his fears and discover that he's much braver than he imagined. Absent: Edgar
68a	18a	"New Century's Eve"	Jean Herlihy	Jeffrey King	David Frasquet	December 14, 2020	TBA	N/A
The Hauntleys gather with Bridget and Poppy to watch the pumpkins drop and make resolutions on New Century's Eve. Absent: Edgar
68b	18b	"Bridget the Brave"	Alan Moran	Melinda LaRose	Cristina Menghi	December 14, 2020	TBA	N/A
Bridget tries to cast a spell to make her fearless, but it causes her friends, Vee, Poppy and Demi, to be afraid of her instead. Absent: Edgar, Oxana, Boris
69a	19a	"Hauntley Home Movies"	Alan Moran	Jeffery King	Fiona Ryan	January 25, 2021	TBA	N/A
Demi and Gregoria help Vee with her school project, "What Was I Like as a Baby".
69b	19b	"Little Drummer Girl"	Maeve Garvan	Mia Resella	Karim Gouyette	January 25, 2021	TBA	N/A
Poppy tries to prevent herself from sneezing during a rock band practice in the basement, so she decides to replace herself for Octo to go in her place.
70a	20a	"The Magic Howl"	Seamus O'Toole	Chelsea Beyl	Brian Hatfield	February 22, 2021	TBA	N/A
When asked to watch a pack of werewolf pups, Vee finds the task easier said than done. Absent: Edgar
70b	20b	"Edgar the Ghoul Girl"	Alan Moran	Karissa Valencia	Cristina Menghi	February 22, 2021	TBA	N/A
Poppy invites Edgar to the Ghoul Girls' band practice, but he feels insecure about being a Ghoul boy for once.
71a	21a	"April Ghoul's Day"	Matt Engstrom	Melinda LaRose	Ilenia Gennari	March 22, 2021	TBA	N/A
It's April Fools Day, and Vee shows Bridget how to tell a joke, but Bridget is too nervous to understand. Absent: Edgar (mentioned)
71b	21b	"Monster's New Bed"	Alan Moran	Kent Redeker	Wickus Cotzee	March 22, 2021	TBA	N/A
After the guest bed breaks, the Under the Bed Monster must approve a new bed. Absent: Edgar
72a	22a	"Making a Splash"	Alan Moran	Mia Resella	Jose Guzman	April 5, 2021	TBA	0.20
Vee's best friend from Transylvania visits for the Firefly Festival, but gets too hot during a Pennsylvania heat wave.
72b	22b	"The Spelling Vee"	Seamus O'Toole	S : Chelsea Beyl; T : Jennifer Hamburg	Jonathan Hashiloni	April 5, 2021	TBA	0.20
Vee competes everyone to a Transylvanian spelling contest, but Bridget couldn't admit she is nervous. Absent: Edgar
73a	23a	"The Curious Case of the Giggles"	Alan Moran	Karissa Valencia	Alex Almaguer	April 19, 2021	TBA	0.16
Hydie Jekyll, a monster-kid scientist, is in town in search of the final ingredient to her secret potion. Absent: Poppy, Bridget, Edgar
73b	23b	"International Treasure"	Seamus O'Toole	Jeffrey King	Wickus Cotzee	April 19, 2021	TBA	0.16
Vee and her friends are invited to take part in special mummy tradition. Absent: Edgar
74a	24a	"Daddy's Little Ghoul"	Maeve Garvan	Karissa Valencia	Ilenia Gennari	June 14, 2021	TBA	N/A
Vee and Boris take a flight for Papa's day. Absent: Poppy, Bridget, Edgar
74b	24b	"Chef Remy's Green Thumb"	Anna Margiotta	Lisa Kettle	Brian Hatfield	June 14, 2021	TBA	N/A
Chef Remy spruces up the backyard before Vee's Woodchuck Woodsies picnic. Absent: Edgar
75	25	"Home is Where the Hauntleys Are"	Jean Herlihy	Chelsea Beyl	Anna Margiotta and Fiona Ryan	June 28, 2021	TBA	N/A
The Hauntleys' vampire identities are put to the ultimate test when the Scare B&B are selected to receive a prestigious award by Edna and the Historical Society. Note: This is the series finale.
