= Amy's Orgasm =

2001 film by Julie Davis

- Poster
- Directed by: Julie Davis
- Written by: Julie Davis
- Produced by: Julie Davis; Fred Kramer
- Starring: Julie Davis; Nick Chinlund; Jeff Cesario; Julie Bowen; Andrea Bendewald
- Cinematography: Mark Mervis
- Edited by: Julie Davis; Glenn Garland
- Music by: Miriam Cutler
- Production companies: Catchlight Films; Serious Dan; Withoutabox
- Distributed by: Magic Lamp
- Release date: March 8, 2001
- Running time: 85 minutes
- Country: United States
- Language: English
- Budget: $500,000

Amy's Orgasm (title censored to Amy's O in many video shops) is a 2001 film directed by Julie Davis. It stars Julie Davis as Amy, a 29-year-old Jewish woman who usually avoids dating as she does not believe in love. The film won the "Audience Choice Award" in the 2001 Santa Barbara International Film Festival.

== Premise ==
Amy is a single 29-year-old Jewish woman. She wrote a successful self-help book about how women can't truly be in love and experience "mental orgasm". Her parents and acquaintances always try to give her advice. Eventually, she breaks her celibacy and starts dating radio shock jock Matthew Starr, who is known for hitting on his bimbo guests. Of all men, will she find in him the true love she never believed in, or will he prove her worst fears true?

== Cast ==
- Julie Davis as Amy Mandell
- Nick Chinlund as Matthew Starr
- Caroline Aaron as Janet Gaines
- Mitchell Whitfield as Don
- Jeff Cesario as Priest
- Mary Ellen Trainor as Amy's Mom
- Charles Cioffi as Amy's Dad
- Tina Lifford as Irene Barris
- Vincent Castellanos as Hans
- Kira Reed as Shannon Steele
- Wally Kurth as Beautiful Guy
- Andrea Bendewald as Beautiful Girl
- Carrie Genzel as Michelle
- Julie Bowen as Nikki
- Jerry Penacoli as Himself
- Marissa Jaret Winokur as Radio P.A.
- Stephen Polk as Bill
