= Wally Kurth =

American actor (born 1958)

- Born: Wallace Kurth; July 31, 1958 (age 68); Billings, Montana, U.S.
- Education: UCLA
- Occupations: Actor; musician
- Years active: 1981–present
- Spouses: Cynthia Ettinger (m. 1990–1993) Rena Sofer (m. 1995–1997) Debra Yuhasz (m. 2003)
- Children: 3

Wallace "Wally" Kurth (born July 31, 1958) is an American actor and musician. He is best known for playing the roles of Justin Kiriakis on Days of Our Lives (1987 to 1991, 2009 to present) and Ned Quartermaine on General Hospital (1991 to 2007, 2013 to present). He has received one Daytime Emmy Award nomination for his work on General Hospital and three nominations for his work on Days of Our Lives.

He is also a guitarist and vocalist for the musical groups Kurth and Taylor and The Day Players Band. Kurth and Taylor won a 2002 Daytime Emmy Award for Outstanding Original Song, "Barefoot Ballet," which was heard on General Hospital.

== Early life ==
Kurth was born and raised in Billings, Montana. He is the youngest of five children. His father was a lawyer and his mother ran a cattle company, inherited from his grandfather. He became interested in acting at ten years old, when he saw the film Oliver! A year later, he won the role of The Artful Dodger in a local production.

He attended Loretto Heights College in Denver, Colorado and also UCLA, where he received a bachelor's degree in 1985.

== Career ==
He played The Pirate King in The Pirates of Penzance on Broadway, debuting January 8, 1981 at the Uris Theatre. He had previously played the role in a touring production of the musical.

Kurth joined the cast of Days of Our Lives, playing Justin Kiriakis from 1987 to 1991. After leaving Days due to lack of storyline, he began playing Ned Quartermaine (then Ashton) on General Hospital in 1991.

His television work includes a guest starring role on Oh, Grow Up and the TV movie, The Stepsister. He has appeared in the films Final Embrace, I Love You, Don't Touch Me!, and Amy's Orgasm. From 2004 to 2007, he hosted a SOAPnet series, 1 Day With..., where he would spend the day with a fellow soap star, including many of his GH castmates.

He was taken off contract at General Hospital in February 2005, but continued to air on a recurring basis until July 2007. In late 2007 and early 2008, he appeared on As the World Turns as Sam Hutchins.

In 2008, Kurth produced and narrated a documentary, Class C: The Only Game in Town, which tells the story of life in Montana small towns through the lens of five girls' basketball teams. The film won two regional Emmy awards. In June 2009, he announced that he would be returning to Days of Our Lives as Justin Kiriakis.

Kurth made guest-starring appearances on Law & Order: LA in 2011 and Hot in Cleveland in 2015. In 2014, he starred in a short film, Blue Skies. Kurth appeared on the web series Ladies of the Lake, based on a novel by Days of Our Lives producer Ken Corday.

He returned to General Hospital as Ned Quartermaine in 2013 and since 2020, continues to appear on both GH and Days of Our Lives. He received a Daytime Emmy Award nomination for Outstanding Supporting Actor in 2018 for his role on General Hospital, then was nominated in the same category for his work on Days of Our Lives in 2020 and 2024. He was nominated for Outstanding Lead Actor for Days of Our Lives in 2021.

He is the lead vocalist and guitarist for the band Kurth and Taylor. The group has performed on and produced songs for General Hospital. Their song, "Barefoot Ballet", won a Daytime Emmy Award in 2002 for Outstanding Original Song. They have released two albums, Kurth & Taylor and Half & Half. Kurth is also a vocalist and guitarist in the Day Players Band, a music group formed with his Days of Our Lives castmates Brandon Barash, Carson Boatman, and Eric Martsolf.

In 2020, he starred in the independent film More Beautiful for Having Been Broken. He also appeared in the 2021 film A Bride's Nightmare. In 2022, Kurth co-starred with Kassie DePaiva in a short film, Common as Red Hair.

== Personal life ==
He is the father of actress Meghann Kurth, who was born in 1985. Kurth has said that his relationship with her mother had ended before he learned they were expecting a child together.

Kurth met actress Cynthia Ettinger when they were in college. They were friends for years before beginning a relationship. They dated for a year and a half before marrying in May 1990. They divorced in 1993.

Kurth married his General Hospital co-star, Rena Sofer, in 1995. They have a daughter, artist Rosabel Rosalind Kurth-Sofer, who was born in September 1996. They divorced in 1997.

On July 4, 2003, he married Debra Yuhasz. They have a son, who was born in November 2004. Their son is on the autism spectrum.

Kurth's mother, Susie, died in April 2026 at the age of 101.

== Filmography ==
=== Film ===
Year	Title	Role	Notes
1992	Final Embrace	Devon	
1994	Pom Poko	Tamasaburo (voice, English version)	
1997	I Love You, Don't Touch Me!	David Barclay	
2001	Amy's Orgasm	Beautiful Guy	
2008	Class C: The Only Game in Town	Narrator	Documentary Also producer
2014	Blue Skies	Tom Hammond	Short film
2019	More Beautiful for Having Been Broken	Bud	
2021	A Bride's Nightmare	Hank	
2022	Common as Red Hair	Will	Short film

=== Television ===
Year	Title	Role	Notes
1987–1991, 2009–present	Days of Our Lives	Justin Kiriakis	Contract role; Recurring role
1991–2007, 2012–present	General Hospital	Ned Quartermaine	Contract role; Recurring role
1997	The Stepsister	Man Holding Baby	Television film, uncredited
1999	Oh, Grow Up	Lewis Morris Jr.	Episode: "Clods and Monsters"
2004	Higglytown Heroes	Eye Doctor Hero (voice)	Episode: "Star Struck"
2004-2007	1 Day With...	Self (Host)	
2007–2008	As the World Turns	Sam Hutchins	Recurring role
2010–2013	Generator Rex	Agent Six, Captain Callan (voice)	Main cast 46 episodes
2011	Law & Order: LA	Gordon Ralston	Episode: "Zuma Canyon"
2013	Hot in Cleveland	Mark	Episode: "Pony Up"

=== Video games ===
Year	Title	Role	Notes
2009	Cartoon Network Universe: FusionFall	Agent Six	
2011	Generator Rex: Agent of Providence	Agent Six, Captain Callan	

=== Web series ===
Year	Title	Role	Notes
2016	Ladies of the Lake	Hudson Montgomery	Episode: "Montgomery"

== Awards and nominations ==
List of awards and nominations
Year	Award	Category	Title	Result	Ref.
2002	Daytime Emmy Award	Outstanding Original Song ("Barefoot Ballet", shared with Christian Taylor and Debra Cochran)	General Hospital	Won	
2018	Daytime Emmy Award	Outstanding Supporting Actor in a Drama Series	General Hospital	Nominated	
2020	Daytime Emmy Award	Outstanding Supporting Actor in a Drama Series	Days of Our Lives	Nominated	
2021	Daytime Emmy Award	Outstanding Lead Actor in a Drama Series	Days of Our Lives	Nominated	
2024	Daytime Emmy Award	Outstanding Supporting Actor in a Drama Series	Days of Our Lives	Nominated	
