= 29th Daytime Emmy Awards =

- Date: May 17, 2002 (Ceremony); April 29, 2002 (Creative Arts Awards)
- Location: The Theater, Madison Square Garden, New York City
- Presented by: National Academy of Television Arts and Sciences
- Hosted by: Bob Barker

Highlights
- Outstanding Drama Series: One Life to Live
- Outstanding Game Show: Jeopardy!

Television/radio coverage
- Network: CBS

The 29th Daytime Emmy Awards ceremony, commemorating excellence in American daytime programming from 2001, was held on May 17, 2002 at the theater at Madison Square Garden in New York City. Hosted by Bob Barker, it was televised in the United States by CBS. It was also the first time the ceremonies were simulcast in Spanish.

Creative Arts Emmy Awards were presented on April 29, 2002.

== Mistakes ==
When Susan Flannery's name was announced as the winner of the Outstanding Lead Actress in a Drama Series Award, the "Flannery" part was unintelligible. Everybody in the television production booth thought it was Susan Lucci who was named, and therefore cut to a shot of Lucci (who was backstage at the time after presenting the previous award), cued the All My Children theme song, and told her to go on stage. Once the producers realized their mistake, they immediately cut to Flannery coming towards the stage, and Lucci returned backstage. The producers apologized for their mistake the following day.

== Nominations and winners ==
The following is a partial list of nominees, with winners in bold:

=== Outstanding Drama Series ===
- All My Children
- As the World Turns
- **One Life to Live**
- The Young and the Restless

=== Outstanding Actor in a Drama Series ===
- **Peter Bergman (Jack Abbott, The Young and the Restless)**
- Hunt Block (Craig Montgomery, As the World Turns)
- Vincent Irizarry (David Hayward, All My Children)
- Robert Newman (Joshua Lewis, Guiding Light)
- Jack Scalia (Chris Stamp, All My Children)

=== Outstanding Actress in a Drama Series ===
- Martha Byrne (Lily Walsh Snyder, As the World Turns)
- **Susan Flannery (Stephanie Forrester, The Bold and the Beautiful)**
- Finola Hughes (Anna Devane, All My Children)
- Susan Lucci (Erica Kane, All My Children)
- Colleen Zenk Pinter (Barbara Ryan, As the World Turns)

=== Outstanding Supporting Actor in a Drama Series ===
- Mark Consuelos (Mateo Santos, All My Children)
- **Josh Duhamel (Leo du Pres, All My Children)**
- Benjamin Hendrickson (Hal Munson, As the World Turns)
- Paul Leyden (Simon Frasier, As the World Turns)
- Cameron Mathison (Ryan Lavery, All My Children)

=== Outstanding Supporting Actress in a Drama Series ===
- **Crystal Chappell (Olivia Spencer, Guiding Light)**
- Beth Ehlers (Harley Cooper, Guiding Light)
- Kelley Menighan Hensley (Emily Stewart, As the World Turns)
- Kelly Ripa (Hayley Vaughan, All My Children)
- Maura West (Carly Snyder, As the World Turns)

=== Outstanding Younger Actor in a Drama Series ===
- Jesse McCartney (JR Chandler, All My Children)
- Brian Presley (Jack Ramsey, Port Charles)
- Justin Torkildsen (Rick Forrester, The Bold and the Beautiful)
- Jordi Vilasuso (Tony Santos, Guiding Light)
- **Jacob Young (Lucky Spencer, General Hospital)**

=== Outstanding Younger Actress in a Drama Series ===
- **Jennifer Finnigan (Bridget Forrester, The Bold and the Beautiful)**
- Jessica Jimenez (Catalina Quesada, Guiding Light)
- Lindsey McKeon (Marah Lewis, Guiding Light)
- Eden Riegel (Bianca Montgomery, All My Children)
- Kristina Sisco (Abigail Williams, As the World Turns)

=== Outstanding Drama Series Writing Team ===
- All My Children
- **As the World Turns**
- One Life to Live
- Passions

=== Outstanding Drama Series Directing Team ===
- All My Children
- As the World Turns
- The Bold and the Beautiful
- **The Young and the Restless**

=== Outstanding Game/Audience Participation Show ===
- Hollywood Squares
- **Jeopardy!**
- The Price Is Right
- Win Ben Stein's Money

=== Outstanding Game Show Host ===
- **Bob Barker, The Price Is Right**
- Pat Sajak, Wheel of Fortune
- Ben Stein and Nancy Pimental, Win Ben Stein's Money
- Alex Trebek, Jeopardy!

=== Outstanding Talk Show ===
- Live With Regis and Kelly
- The Montel Williams Show
- **The Rosie O'Donnell Show**
- The View

=== Outstanding Talk Show Host ===
- **Rosie O'Donnell, The Rosie O'Donnell Show**
- Regis Philbin and Kelly Ripa, Live With Regis and Kelly
- Barbara Walters, Meredith Vieira, Star Jones, Joy Behar and Lisa Ling, The View
- Montel Williams, The Montel Williams Show

=== Outstanding Service Show ===
- The Christopher Lowell Show
- Essence of Emeril
- Martha Stewart Living
- This Old House
- **Wolfgang Puck**

=== Outstanding Service Show Host ===
- Emeril Lagasse, Essence of Emeril
- Christopher Lowell, The Christopher Lowell Show
- **Martha Stewart, Martha Stewart Living**
- Steve Thomas, This Old House

=== Outstanding Special Class Series ===
- **Behind the Screen with John Burke**
- Cool Women in History with Susan Sarandon
- Judge Judy
- Pop-up Video
- Trading Spaces

=== Outstanding Children's Animated Program ===
- Arthur
- Clifford the Big Red Dog
- Dora the Explorer
- Dragon Tales
- **Madeline**

=== Outstanding Special Class Animated Program ===
- Batman Beyond
- The Legend of Tarzan
- Little Bill
- Rolie Polie Olie
- **Gary Baseman, Bill Steinkellner, Cherie Steinkellner, Jess Winfield, Nancylee Myatt, Timothy Björklund, Alfred Gimeno, Jamie Thomason and David Maples (Teacher's Pet)**

=== Outstanding Sound Editing ===
- **Greg Stewart, Ian Emberton, Wendy Romano, Tony Gort and Patrick S. Clark (Off Season)**
- Michael C. Gutierre, James L. Pearson, Anthony Torretto, Susan Welsh and Debby Ruby-Winsberg (The Nightmare Room)
- Michael Lyle, James Bladon, Paul Menichini, Marc Allen and Lance Wiseman (V.I.P.)

=== Outstanding Sound Editing - Special Class ===
- **Roshaun Hawley, Paca Thomas, Dan Cubert and Marc S. Perlman (Men in Black: The Series)**
- Robert Schott, Brian Beatrice and Christopher Fina (Between the Lions)
- Robert Duran and Roshaun Hawley (Jackie Chan Adventures)

=== Outstanding Sound Mixing ===
- **Stephen Traub and Ric Jurgens (The Zack Files)**
- Robert Montrone, Joe Carpenter, Josiah Gluck and David Pliskin (Martha Stewart Living)
- Matt Foglia (MTV: Grammys Uncensored)
- Chuck Buch and Edward F. Suski (Power Rangers Time Force)
- Christopher Allan and Dan Lesiw (Zoom)

=== Outstanding Sound Mixing - Special Class ===
- **Dick Maitland, Blake Norton and Bob Schott (Sesame Street)**
- Stéphane Bergeron (Arthur)
- Gregory Cathcart, Devon Bowman and Dan Cubert (Clifford the Big Red Dog)
- Melissa Ellis, Fil Brown and Dan Cubert (Jackie Chan Adventures)

=== Outstanding Single Camera Editing ===
- **Roderick Davis, Tad Nyland and John Gilbert (V.I.P.)**
- Douglas Schuetz, Juantxo Royo and Laura Young (Reading Rainbow)
- Terry Cafaro, Vincent J. Straggas and Laura Cheshire (Between the Lions)
- Gary Stephenson (This Old House)
- Brian Ford and Todd Maurer (Trading Spaces)
- Arnie Harchik and Julie Kahn Zunder (Zoom)

=== Outstanding Performer In An Animated Program ===
- Jackie Chan, (Himself, Jackie Chan Adventures)
- Kel Mitchell (T-Bone, Clifford the Big Red Dog)
- John Ritter (Clifford, Clifford the Big Red Dog)
- **Charles Shaughnessy (Dennis, Stanley)**
- Alicia Silverstone (Sharon Spitz, Braceface)

=== Outstanding Pre-School Children's Series ===
- Blue's Clues
- **Sesame Street**

=== Outstanding Children's Series ===
- Between the Lions
- Discovery Kids Ultimate Guide to the Awesome
- Even Stevens
- **Reading Rainbow**
- ZOOM

=== Outstanding Directing in a Children's Series ===
- **Mitchell Kriegman and Dean Gordon (The Book of Pooh)**
- **Emily Squires, Ted May, Steve Feldman, Victor DiNapoli, Jim Martin, Lisa Simon and Ken Diego (Sesame Street)**
- Lucy Walker, Dave Palmer and Koyalee Chanda (Blue's Clues)
- Ed Wiseman (Reading Rainbow)
- Bob Comiskey (ZOOM)

=== Outstanding Directing in a Children's Special ===
- **Adam Arkin (My Louisiana Sky)**
- Eric Stoltz (My Horrible Year!)
- Bruce Davison (Off Season)
- Richard Friedenberg (Snow in August)

=== Outstanding Performer in a Children's Series ===
- **LeVar Burton (Himself, Reading Rainbow)**
- Kevin Clash (Elmo, Sesame Street)
- Mary-Kate Olsen (Riley, So Little Time)
- Donna Pescow (Eileen Stevens, Even Stevens)
- Fred Rogers (Mister Rogers, Mister Rogers' Neighborhood)

=== Outstanding Performer in a Children's Special ===
- **Kelsey Keel (Tiger Ann Parker, My Louisiana Sky)**
- Kevin Clash (Elmo, Elmo's World: The Wild Wild West)
- Juliette Lewis (Dorie Kay, My Louisiana Sky)
- Hume Cronyn (Sam Clausner, Off Season)
- Stephen Rea (Rabbi Judah Hirsch, Snow in August)

=== Outstanding Writing in a Children's Special ===
- **Glenn Gers (Off Season)**
- Molly Boylan and Judy Freudberg (Elmo's World: The Wild Wild West)
- Anna Sandor (My Louisiana Sky)
- Karen Leigh Hopkins (What Girls Learn)

=== Outstanding Individual Achievement in Animation ===
- **Valery Mihalkov (Sagwa, the Chinese Siamese Cat)**

=== Lifetime Achievement Award ===
- **John Cannon**, longtime announcer and voice-over actor.

=== Special Tribute ===
- **Guiding Light**
