= Tom Hughes and Margo Montgomery =

Fictional couple from As the World Turns

Tom and Margo Hughes (Scott Holmes and Ellen Dolan)

Thomas "Tom" Hughes and Margo Montgomery Hughes are fictional characters and a supercouple on the American CBS daytime drama As the World Turns. The pairing has been called "one of the greatest examples of the action-adventure and fantasy romance of soaps during [the early 1980s]." For most of the last two decades of the show, Tom was played by Scott Holmes and Margo was played by Ellen Dolan. On internet message boards, the couple is often referred by the portmanteau "Tomargo" (for Tom and Margo).

== Storyline ==
Tom and Margo first became involved during the couple's investigation of Mr. Big, who eventually held them captive in his mansion for several weeks. At the time, Tom was involved with Margo's aunt Maggie, but he eventually broke up with her to be with Margo.

Tom and Margo got married in 1983, and unlike many other couples on soap operas, their marriage has survived for over 25 years despite adultery on both sides. While married, Margo had an affair with Hal Munson, resulting in her getting pregnant with a son she named Adam, who was, for a time, presumed to be Tom's biological son. Years later, Tom had an affair with Emily Stewart which left Emily pregnant with Tom's child, Daniel. Tom and Margo have one son together, Casey. Tom also discovered that he had fathered a child while in Vietnam, whom he had never known about. His daughter, Lien, tracked Tom down as an adult and eventually built a relationship with him. Lien, like her father, is an attorney.

The 1990s were full of trauma for Tom and Margo as Margo faced murder charges for the assisted suicide of her stepfather, Casey Peretti. Margo was later raped, and after learning that her rapist was HIV positive, she spent months worrying about her own status before test results proved that she did not have the virus.

In 2005, Tom and Margo discovered that their son Casey had had a baby with Gwen Norbeck who died a short while after he was born. Though initially furious at Casey for his immaturity and lack of judgment, they later forgave him.

== Tom Hughes ==
Tom is the son of Dr. Bob Hughes and Bob's first wife Lisa Miller, and was born soon after the two eloped as teenagers. He had a difficult childhood, as his parents split up soon after he was born and often fought bitterly. He was SORASed during the late 1960s and was sent to Vietnam, returning a few months later with a self-inflicted injury and a drug habit. He had a number of brushes with the law, including stealing drugs, and later a murder conviction. (He had confessed to the murder of his stepfather, Dr. Michael Shea, to cover for his mother, Lisa, who he mistakenly assumed had committed the murder). After being cleared of the charges when the real murderer was discovered, Tom went to law school, and became an attorney. He was married twice (Carol Hughes and Natalie Bannon), before eventually marrying Margo Montgomery in 1983. The two split up in 1999 over Tom's affair with Emily Stewart, and Margo's subsequent fling with Alec Wallace, but reconciled in early 2000.

=== Actors ===
Tom has been played by 13 different actors since the character's birth in 1961.

- James Madden (1963)
- Jerry Schaffer (1963)
- Frankie Michaels (1964–1966)
- Richard Thomas (1966–1967)
- Paul O'Keefe (1967–1968)
- Peter Link (1969)
- Peter Galman (1969–1974)
- C. David Colson (1974–1978)
- Tom Tammi (1979–1980)
- Justin Deas (1980–1984)
- Jason Kincaid (1984)
- Gregg Marx (1984–1987)
- Scott Holmes (1987–2010)

== Margo Montgomery Hughes ==
Margo Montgomery was the daughter of Lyla Montgomery, a nurse and aspiring singer, and Dr. John Dixon (though she did not learn John was her father until adulthood). Margo had three siblings: Cricket Montgomery, Craig Montgomery, and Katie Peretti. She initially became a nurse, as her mother had been, but later switched professions to become a police officer. When Margo's son, Adam, was born in 1988, it was assumed that he was Tom's son, but it later came out that he was the result of a fling between Margo and Detective Hal Munson. Tom and Margo later had another son, Casey. In 1999, devastated over Tom's affair with Emily, Margo began a friendship with Alec Wallace, a criminal she was investigating, which eventually led to a romance. When Wallace was found murdered and Margo was in his bed, unaware of how she got there (she could not remember the previous night's activities), she was charged with his murder, but was later cleared, when the real murderer was discovered. She and Tom then reconciled, and remained more or less happily married through ATWT's final episode in 2010.

=== Actresses ===
The role of Margo has been played by four different actresses.

- Margaret Colin (1980–1983)
- Hillary B. Smith (1983–1989)
- Ellen Dolan (1989–1993, 1994–2010)
- Glynnis O'Connor (1993–1994)

== See also ==
- List of supercouples
