= Margo Hughes =

- As the World Turns character
- Ellen Dolan as Margo Hughes
- Portrayed by: Margaret Colin (1980–1983); Hillary B. Smith (1983–1989); Ellen Dolan (1989–1993, 1994–2010); Glynnis O'Connor (1993–1994)
- Duration: 1980–2010
- First appearance: July 1980
- Last appearance: September 17, 2010
- Created by: Bridget and Jerome Dobson
- Introduced by: Fred Bartholomew
In-universe information
- Other names: Margo Montgomery
- Occupation: Chief of police; Detective; Nurse; Stablehand
- Parents: John Dixon; Lyla Crawford
- Half-brothers: Duke Kramer; Craig Montgomery; Andy Dixon; M.J. Dixon; Johnny Dixon, Jr.
- Half-sisters: Cricket Montgomery; Katie Peretti
- Husband: Tom Hughes (1983–present)
- Sons: Adam Munson; Casey Hughes
- Stepsons: Daniel Hughes
- Stepdaughters: Lien Hughes
- Grandsons: Billy Norbeck

Margo Hughes is a fictional character on the daytime soap opera As the World Turns, a show about working life in the fictional town of Oakdale. She was first played by Margaret Colin, and then by Hillary B. Smith for six years. However the actress most recognized for the role is Ellen Dolan, who played the character from December 18, 1989 until 2010, with a break from January 1993 to June 1994 when Glynnis O'Connor played the role.

Margo's storylines often focus on family dramas and police matters. The character is portrayed as a stoic, hard-nosed, determined and level-headed character, who in later years has begun interfering in the lives of her children. A pivotal storyline for the character came in 1992 when the character was raped by two criminals she was attempting to arrest during a holdup. The storyline was continually re-hashed by the show in the years after.

Margo's only marriage in her 30-year history on the show was with that of lawyer Thomas "Tom" Hughes. The couple met during their investigation of Mr. Big and married in 1983. The super couple endured many trials and tribulations over their 27 years of marriage, most notably when Margo had an affair with Hal Munson, and Tom cheated on Margo with Emily Stewart. For her work on the show, Dolan won Soap Opera Digest's Outstanding Supporting Actress award in 1993, and was nominated for a Daytime Emmy the same year.

== Creation and casting ==
=== Background ===
The character of Margo Montgomery was brought in as the daughter of Lyla Montgomery and John Dixon. Marrying Tom Hughes three years after her arrival, the move connected her to the core Hughes family. Margo miscarried three children with Tom and gave birth to son Casey Hughes. In the 1980s, Margo gave birth to a son Adam Munson which turned out to be the son of policeman Hal Munson.

=== Casting ===
The character of Margo had been with the soap since 1980 and was played by several actresses:

- Margaret Colin (1980–1983)
- Hillary Bailey Smith (1983–1989)
- Ellen Dolan (1989–1993; 1994-2010)
- Glynnis O'Connor (1993–1994)

Originating the role in 1980, The Edge of Night's Colin stayed for two years (eventually marrying her on-screen love interest Justin Deas). In 1983, Bailey took over the role and admitted Deas didn't agree with the idea of the character being recast. "Because he and Margaret (Colin), they were not yet together. This was his way of interacting with her at work, he didn’t like the idea that she wasn’t there anymore. I think I handled him the best and that’s why I got the job. Subsequently we became really good friends." In 1989, after six years with the show, Bailey Smith quit the role, admitting she was burned out after her time on As the World Turns. "I wanted to spend more time with my kids. I felt I had taken Margo to the length I could take her. I needed to do something else. Doug’s feeling was, “Go take a break and come back.” I said, “I’d loved to do that, I just need a break.”

Ellen Dolan was offered the role of Margo Montgomery Hughes in 1989 by then head-writer Douglas Marland. Dolan said four years of Guiding Light helped her prepare for the role. "I wanted her to be funny/quirky .... everything you don't get to see in her these days." Dolan's first scene on the show, she revealed to CBS, was aboard an airplane. "My first storyline Casey, my husband’s Casey, had some rare disease and he was going to die. And I unplugged his life support but the way they brought the character of Margo back was they brought her home, so my first scenes were on an airplane," Dolan recalled. Dolan said the writers never wrote the character funny and any humour there was she brought it to the show. "Anything that's in there that brings a twinkle to anybody’s eye is what I bring to it. In fact, they have to take a lot of it away. They don't let me do it a lot."

After several years of forecasting the cancellation of the 54-year-old show, Dolan's 20-year role came to an end when CBS ended the show, with the last episode airing in September 2010. When asked how she hoped her character would leave, she replied: "I don't hope anymore."

== Storylines ==
=== Arrival in Oakdale ===
Upon arriving in Oakdale, Margo Montgomery immediately became involved with the married James Stenbeck. When Margo confided in her friend, Jeff Ward, that James loved her and would marry her, Jeff told her she was a fool. Meanwhile, Margo was beginning continually perplexed at her mother, Lyla's, antagonism toward Dr. John Dixon and his likewise cold demeanor toward Lyla. Not long after, Margo's life changed forever during Dee Stewart's rape trial. Lyla was a witness and seemed to be protecting the accused, John Dixon. District Attorney Tom Hughes's questioning of Lyla brought out the truth: John Dixon was Margo's real father. After being exonerated, John ended up being a victim of a hit and run. John was in the hospital for a few days and started running his own investigation despite the pleas of Lt. Savage not to. John pretended that he was blind and asked to stay with Margo at the house that she lived in on the Stenbeck estate. While John was supposedly recuperating but faking his blindness, he was dismayed to find out that Margo was carrying on an affair with James. John had started to suspect that James was involved somehow with John's nemesis, Dr. Rick Ryan. John was even more convinced of this when he saw Rick and James having secret meetings. When James set up Rick to date not only Margo but also his good friend, Hayley Wilson, James started to suspect that John was investigating him. Realizing that John wasn'tblind, James threatened to kill John with a knife. However, John recorded the whole meeting on a hidden audio tape. Soon, John discovered it was James who had attempted to kill him in the hit and run. Meanwhile, Tom, who was dating Margo's Aunt Maggie, tried to convince Margo that John was faking his blindness, but Margo didn't believe him.

=== Relationship with her father, John Dixon ===
Finally, one day in August 1981, John tried to play the blackmail tape for Margo, but the only thing on it was music from the rock group the Rolling Stones—Margo's sister, Cricket, had gotten her hands on the tape. John, however, had a duplicate tape in his safe deposit box. Margo got angry at him and told John that she was no longer his nursemaid, Later, Margo got miffed when John sought pity from his former wife Kim Andropolous and Margo's mother, Lyla. Tom had obviously made Margo suspicious of John's "blindness", but it wasn't enough, because although Margo ordered John out of her house, she quickly took him back. Later, learning that James was having *another* affair with a woman named Connie Wilson, Margo realized that her relationship with James was going nowhere and she ended it. It was her break-up with James that led Margo to a career in law enforcement, and she began working as an assistant for the law firm of Lowell, Colman, and Hughes for her Aunt Maggie. At the same time, Maggie and Tom started drifting away from each other. Meanwhile, one night, Margo accidentally got locked in at Fashions, Ltd. While investigating the place, that night James decided that there were too many people who suspected that he was smuggling drugs and jewels through Fashions so he decided to have it torched, while Margo was locked inside. Luckily, Margo was saved by Ernie Ross and her sister, Cricket, and all three put the fire out and saved Fashions. But as she waited for Ernie and Cricket to save her, Margo stumbled across the cache of illegal drugs and jewels. Despite her having found the evidence, Tom read Margo the riot act for almost having herself killed and he fired her. Undeterred, when Margo learned about a connection between Stenbeck and Mr. Big, Margo followed James to Paris to see what he was up to. To her surprise, Tom followed her. Soon, she spotted two thugs following James and Miranda Marlowe.

=== James Stenbeck ===
To investigate the connection between James and Mr. Big, she and Tom took off for the greenhouse. The meeting started on March 4, 1982, just as Margo and Tom arrived with the FBI hot on their trail. Mr. Big accused James of being a spy and Miranda of being a traitor. Miranda pulled a gun, but Mr. Big had already removed its firing pin. Seeing the danger they were in, Tom started a fire. In the confusion, Tom and Margo managed to escape, and so did Mr. Big. Tom and Margo spotted a plane in the field, and with Margo at the controls (although not knowing how to pilot a plane), they took off. Tom and Margo were horrified to learn that Mr. Big was hiding in the back, and before he jumped, he told them the tank was almost empty since he had siphoned off the gas of his plane. Margo somehow managed to land in a deserted area. For several days in the south of France, Tom and Margo seemed lost and neither of them knew French fluently enough to ask for directions. Finally, Margo spotted a castle in a clearing. Upon entering, they found a kitchen stocked with pancake mix and brandy but the phone was dead. A sudden gust of wind slammed the door, and an unseen hand turned the key in the lock. Exhausted, Tom and Margo went to sleep, awakening to a gourmet meal. Tom wanted to run, but their path was blocked by a 400-pound mute. This silent man, whose name was Bruno (who had killed Connie Wilson back in September 1981), ushered them to the table, and to their horror, Mr. Big joined them. This was Mr. Big's castle and he was about to show Tom and Margo how horrifying it was. Mr. Big proceeded to play games with his captives. Their only escape lay in figuring out clues from classic literature. If they failed, they would die. In the "room of love," (from March 17–19, 1982) Margo stepped on a painted heart and was shot by an arrow (with only a minor injury to her arm. Tom found the clue in a Robert Browning sonnet, and they escaped.

=== Entry into the police force ===
Meanwhile, Tom and Margo realized they were in love, but once they met with Bob and then flew back to Oakdale they realized they had to keep their love for one another a secret since Tom was still seeing Margo's aunt Maggie. Maggie did figure it out, but since Margo did not want to hurt her aunt, she asked Tom to cool it between the two of them. Margo also decided to become a police officer. In May 1982, she passed the police academy entrance exams, but everyone worried for her safety. The officer in charge, Captain Aaron Striker, made it clear that Margo would have to prove herself. In July, she solved one of Striker's cases, and when he tried to take the credit, Margo called his bluff. Striker wanted her dismissed, but Margo caught him in the locker room with a shapely blond officer. Striker realized she'd make one hell of a policewoman and kept her on the force. Meanwhile, Tom finally convinced Margo of his love for her, and she agreed to see him. Later, Mr. Big arrived at Margo's cottage and searched thoroughly for a hat. Margo had no idea of the hat's importance and had given Tom the band from the hat, which Tom gave to his younger half-sister, Frannie. Later, Mr. Big came back to the cottage, knife in hand, and found the hat. John finally convinced Margo that Mr. Big was in town and that he had spotted him. Margo agreed to follow John to a clearing, but at first didn't see anything and doubted her father. Just as she was getting ready to leave, Margo spotted Mr. Big with a henchman. Margo told John to lie low and not confront Mr. Big while she went to get help. John didn't listen and confronted Mr. Big. Mr. Big held a gun on John and told him to stop following him or he'd be dead. Meanwhile, Margo was duped by another tape sent to her by one of Mr. Big's henchman into going to a nightclub on Halloween evening, 1982. At the nightclub, there was a magic show. Mr. Big informed the magician that Margo would make a wonderful assistant. She was handcuffed and blindfolded and put in a box.

=== Kidnapped by Mr. Big ===
When the box was opened, Margo was gone, as was a cougar. In an isolated room away from the nightclub, Mr. Big told Margo that if she didn't tell him where the hatband was, he would release the cougar. Luckily, Tom saved Margo in the nick of time, and she told Tom about the hatband, which Frannie had left at Fashions. Miranda told Margo that Mr. Big had said something about his fortune being locked up under his hat. They found a miniature audiotape sewed into the hatband, which computer genius Ernie Ross offered to decode. The only two words they could make out were "Bilan" and "Corsica." Miranda was shocked: Bilan was her daughter by Jacques. She was 17, and Miranda hadn't seen her in some time. After Mr. Big had killed Jacques, he had kidnapped Bilan, from a convent near Nice, France, and spirited her to his ranch in the east African island nation of Zanzibar. Mr. Big had nearly convinced Bilan that he was her biological father, which was untrue. Mr. Big was shocked to learn that Bilan knew the secrets to the fortune that he felt Jacques had kept for himself and quickly booked an airline flight to Zanzibar. Miranda feared for the daughter. Tom and Margo went to the convent in France, where Bilan was last seen. They figured out that Mr. Big had spirited Bilan to his ranch in Zanzibar. Big beat them to Zanzibar, though, and released Bilan into the care of a village of Bububu (Kiswahili's) tribe. By this time, Bilan had fallen quite ill and the priest in a nearby village church told Mr. Big where to find Bilan. Tom and Margo weren't having as much luck, but were hot on Mr. Big's trail. However, before they arrived near the village, they had to go on adventure on the Rufiji River and nearly drowned during a storm. On a nearby bank, while drying out from the storm, one evening Margo went skinny-dipping. Tom awoke and saw her, and they had sex for the first time.

=== Mr. Big's death ===
Tom and Margo met some Bububu people who were willing to tell them where Bilan was. However, Mr. Big met them and decided to kill them once and for all. Mr. Big arranged for Tom and Margo to be released into a pit of poisonous snakes that nearly killed them. But when Mr. Big left to go retrieve Bilan, Margo was able to convince the chief of the village to let Tom and Margo go. Margo had no idea that she had promised the chief to be his perfect seventh wife, in an exchange for their freedom. When the chief took Margo (his seventh wife) and Tom back to the village, Margo and Tom discovered a very ill Bilan. Margo nursed Bilan until her fever broke, but then Mr. Big kidnapped the girl, with Tom and Margo in pursuit. In a clearing tent, Mr. Big tried to get Bilan to decode the message, but Bilan was still delirious from the fever and couldn't concentrate. When Tom and Margo caught up with them, Mr. Big set fire to the tent, without Tom, Margo and Bilan realizing and there were explosives in the tent. Tom, Margo and Bilan were okay, but then Big went missing. He was presumed dead, although Margo had her doubts that Tom tried his best to relieve. Sure enough Margo was proven correct. During the village chief's wedding ceremony to a clueless Margo, Mr. Big turned up alive. He again kidnapped Bilan to get her to decode her father's message. Meanwhile, Tom and Margo swam to Big's boat. They grabbed Bilan and tried to escape, but were caught. Margo begged Mr. Big to spare Bilan. Suddenly, Bilan grabbed a hold of Mr. Big and struggled with him and threw him overboard where Mr. Big met his untimely death, when he was eaten by one of the crocodiles.

=== Marriage to Tom Hughes ===
After Tom and Margo returned to Oakdale, on January 24, 1983, they were thrown a grand surprise party by Maggie and Lyla. Tom and Margo had intended to tell Maggie about their true feelings, but when they walked into the door, Margo collapsed. Margo was taken to Memorial Hospital and it discovered that she had been bitten by a mosquito. She recovered rather quickly, but was astounded to learn that Tom had defended the woman who had supposedly killed her father John, Dee Stewart. Margo broke up with Tom and discovered that she was pregnant. Sadly, Margo miscarried the baby. Tom misinterpreted the situation and mistakenly believed that she'd had an abortion. Later Margo would take Tom back, when she learned that John was still alive. Finally, in the summer of 1983, Margo and Tom married in an impromptu ceremony in the park.

=== Affair with Hal and her pregnancy ===
Margo's first crisis came when Barbara Ryan decided that she wanted Tom back. She set it up so that he would believe they had sex. When Tom told Margo about the "affair", she planned to divorce him. Luckily, she found out that there was no affair. She and Tom reconciled and she became pregnant. However, Margo miscarried the baby. Still despondent over the miscarriage, she was crushed when Tom went to Washington DC to work on the crime commission. During Tom's absence, Margo confided in her best friend, Hal Munson. Believing her marriage was over, they began an affair. Soon after Tom returned, he and Margo decided to put their marriage back together. When Margo learned that she was pregnant (with Hal's baby) she fled the country. Tom found her in Greece and ended up delivering her son, Adam. Tom agreed to raise Adam as his own.

=== Birth of Casey ===
A few years later, Margo became pregnant with Tom's child. At the same time, Margo's stepfather, Casey Peretti, was terminally ill and made her promise to unplug the machines that he was hooked up to. Margo fulfilled her promise, but charges were brought up against her. The charges were dropped. Margo then gave birth to a son, Casey.

=== Rape and Nevins break-in ===
A few years later, Margo's idyllic life would come crashing down in an instant. The night Tom, the boys, and she returned home from vacation to Cape Cod, Margo went out to pick up a bottle of Tom's favorite wine. However, she stepped right in the middle of a hold-up. Margo chased the perpetrators into a dark alley in an effort to get their license plate number. Suddenly, the men grabbed her and pulled her into a car where one of the robbers viciously raped her. Afterward, instead of dealing with her trauma, Margo put all her energies into catching the men—Fickett and the man who raped her, Elroy Nevins. When both men were apprehended, the Hughes family was horrified to learn that Nevins was HIV positive. That meant that Margo could be too. Although her initial test came back negative, Margo had to wait six months for final word on her prognosis. Meanwhile, Nevins pleaded guilty to the rape but when Tom and Margo discovered that an unremorseful Nevins knew he was HIV positive, they pressed charges and tried him for attempted murder which led to a stiffer sentence. As the months went by, Tom lovingly supported Margo as she dealt with her rape. Finally, after six months the Hughes family was relieved to learn that Margo was HIV negative. The following year, Nevins escaped from prison and broke into the Hughes house to seek revenge. Tom confronted him using Margo's gun and shot him when Nevins reached for his own gun.

=== Return to Oakdale ===
In the meantime, the Hughes took in Dawn Wheeler—another of Nevins's victims—who was HIV positive. Dawn developed a harmless crush on Tom. However, Margo didn't find it so harmless and accepted Jason Benedict's offer to come to work with the F.B.I. on special investigation into the Grimaldi family. After spending a few months in Washington DC, Margo started getting homesick and returned to Oakdale to be with Tom and the boys.

=== Plane crash ===
A few years later, Margo was involved in a plane crash. Following the crash, she suffered from post-traumatic stress disorder and had to be institutionalized. When she returned, her relationship with Tom and her sons was somewhat strained.

=== Tom and Emily Stewart ===
Shortly after, Margo accidentally killed Eddie Silva's mother during a drug bust. Margo felt extremely guilty and asked Eddie to stay with her family. Tom (who was having his own problems) was adamantly against this. Eddie's presence helped put a strain on their marriage. Eddie had a crush on Margo and told her so. However, unbeknownst to both, this conversation was filmed and broadcast by Emily Stewart for Tom to see in the hope that it would break up Margo and Tom. In the fall of 1998, Margo became pregnant with Tom's child. Hesitant at first, she decided that having a baby might be good for them. However, Margo miscarried. The same night Margo lost her baby, Tom was having a one-night stand with Emily. When Margo found out about the affair, she threw Tom out. She relented though and took him back, only to learn that Emily was pregnant. Unable to deal with the fact that Emily was now a permanent part of their lives, Margo served Tom with separation papers. About this time, she met the mysterious Alec Wallace and became friends with him.

=== Renewing of her wedding vows ===
Soon, Margo found herself drawn to this complicated and brooding man. Alec intrigued Margo and when he came under investigation by the police, Margo agreed to go undercover even though she was certain that he was innocent of any wrongdoing. When evidence came forth that Alec might have been involved in several deaths, Margo was sure he was innocent and was determined to prove that everyone was wrong about Alec. Margo realized too late that she was wrong. When Margo found Alec in Tom's hospital room after he was attacked, she immediately knew that she made a mistake and was determined to send him to jail. Alec was on to her though, and drugged her. The next morning, Margo woke up with Alec dead and she had no memory of what happened. Subsequently, Margo was tried and convicted of his murder. Margo remembered who killed Alec and the conviction was overturned. Margo's greatest supporter during this crisis was Tom, who never believed that she killed Alec even when she had doubts. After a harrowing year, Tom and Margo renewed their wedding vows.

=== Years after ===
Since renewing her vows, Margo spent her time dealing with her siblings' various schemes and crises. She cut all ties with Katie after learning that Katie had lied about (among other things) Chris Hughes stalking her. Margo also had many an argument with Hal over his treatment of Craig. After Hal was forced to resign as chief of detectives after decking Craig, Margo inherited the position. Aside from scorn from other officers for "stealing" Hal's job, she had to agonize over her actions after arresting her brother for the boathouse explosion, which nearly killed Barbara.

=== Katie's donation ===
Margo's rape of years ago came back to haunt her when she learned that she had hepatitis C. Deathly ill, Margo's liver failed and she required a transplant. Katie was able to donate part of her liver and Margo recovered. Instead of taking a break from police work, Margo threw herself into her job and became involved in several criminal investigations.

=== Margo's affair ===
In 2004, the Hughes marriage would reach another crisis with the arrival of former football star and new sports anchor for WOAK, Doc Reese. From the moment she laid eyes on him, Margo, inexplicably, found herself drawn to this man who oozed sex appeal. It soon became apparent that Doc was attracted to Margo as well and he wasted no time flirting with her, flirting that she participated in. Although her best friend, Jessica Griffin Harris, tried to warn Margo that she was playing with fire, Margo enjoyed the attention and saw nothing wrong with it. However, as the weeks went by, Margo became more and more attracted to Reese who pursued her with a passion, making her feel desirable. Soon Margo's self-control started to crumble, especially after she found herself caught in a smoldering kiss with Doc in the club's sauna. After stopping things from going too far (only because an employee at the club, Jill, walked in and interrupted), Margo couldn't stop thinking of Doc and began to consider that it might be best to have sex with him, thereby getting him out of her system. However, the night she was going to go through with it, Doc unexpectedly refused her and asked her to leave his hotel room. Doc's rejection worked like a cold shower for Margo and the next morning she confided to Jessica that she was over him.

Margo's lies and distracted behavior came back to haunt her when Tom, learning she'd lied to him about working late the previous night, saw a pattern to her behavior and accused her of having an affair with Reese. Although Margo tried to tell Tom that nothing happened between her and Reese, he didn't believe her and was convinced she was holding something back. Trying to satisfy him, she admitted to the flirting but made it seem much more innocent than it actually was. Again, Tom didn't believe her. Soon, Margo found herself being blackmailed by Jill, who asked for a night with Doc in exchange for her silence. Although Margo pleaded with Doc to comply, he saw Jill as a troublemaker and refused to go through with it. True to her word, Jill went to Tom and told him about seeing Margo and Doc come out of the sauna together. Found out, Margo told Tom about the smoldering kisses she and Doc shared but insisted that nothing sexual occurred. Although he believed her, it was too late. Disgusted with the way she'd lied to him, Tom filed for a legal separation. At the same time, Margo learned that Doc did have an affair—with Jessica. That knowledge put a crimp in her friendship with Jessica. However, by year's end, Margo healed her relationship with not only Jess, but Tom as well.

=== Dealing with Casey ===
Meanwhile, Casey was growing into quite the teenager. Unlike Adam, who was always very responsible, Casey was somewhat of a slacker. During his senior year in high school, Casey was named the father of Gwen Norbeck's baby. However, Casey denied it vehemently and, although Tom had doubts, Margo believed him. Months later, after Gwen learned that her baby had died, Casey finally owned up to his parents and admitted that Gwen had been pregnant with his child. Margo was saddened not only at losing the grandchild that she never knew she had but also at Casey's failure to own up to his responsibility. Because of his history, Margo was wary when Casey grew closer to young Maddie Coleman who ultimately became a good influence on him. In the meantime, Oakdale was saddened when Hal was killed in the line of duty. With her dear friend gone, Margo was promoted to chief of police. At the same time, Casey's irresponsibility got him into trouble again—this time from gambling online. Casey racked up a huge debt and resorted to stealing from Lisa in order to pay it. However, when Casey revealed the truth to Adam, Adam convinced him to set Will Munson up for the crime. Now a music producer, Adam, unbeknownst to everyone, was obsessed with Will's wife Gwen. Finally, Casey went to his parents and confessed what he had done. Meanwhile, Adam was nowhere to be found. Several weeks later, Margo would learn that Adam was on the lam after trying to rape Gwen. Still shocked by the actions of her older son, Margo was even more saddened when Casey was sent to jail. Though her family tried to assure her that she had been a good mother, Margo frequently had doubts.

=== Casey's release from prison ===
Eight months later, Casey was finally released. Though Tom warned her to give Casey some time to adjust, Margo immediately began peppering him with questions about his future. Soon after his arrival, Margo returned home and thought she heard Adam's voice. However, it wasn't Adam—it was Casey's friend, Matt O’Connor. Matt, who appeared to be a good kid, informed Margo that he met Casey at Oakdale University. Instantly taking a liking to Matt, Margo invited him into her home. As the weeks went by, Matt seemed to be a good influence on Casey—especially since Casey agreed to take some courses at Oakdale U. Then one day, Margo was shocked to find a note “I'll be there when you least expect it.” That same night, Margo apparently got a call from Adam asking her to meet him at the church at Luther's Corner. When Margo and Tom went, it wasn't Adam they found—it was Matt who'd been shot. Matt told Margo that the man who shot him was Gray Girard, his employer. Meanwhile, Alison Stewart had seen Matt in conversation with Gray various times. Suspecting that Gray was bad news, Alison took her suspicions to Casey and the two found out something startling—Gray's real name was Gerald Nevins. Casey called Margo with the news and Margo realized that it could not be a coincidence. Gray must be related to her rapist.

=== Shooting of Gray ===
Meanwhile, Matt quickly recovered and confessed that Gray hired him to infiltrate the Hughes home. He also admitted that the Hughes had been good to him and felt remorse. Since Gray was wanted for racketeering by the FBI, Matt was supposed to be taken into custody for questioning. Instead he was kidnapped by Gray and brought to the Hughes house while Casey and Alison were there. Gray held the group hostage and forced Casey to call his mother by threatening to kill Alison. When Margo arrived, Gray held her hostage as well and revealed that he was Roy Nevins's brother. A cold Gray blamed Margo for his brother's death and told Margo that he'd waited years to get his revenge. Gray then set a bomb and walked out. Luckily, the bomb was defective and failed to go off. That same night, Gray snuck into the Hughes home to finish what he started. Ali returned to get her cell phone and while talking with Margo spotted Gray with a gun. Alison shoved Margo out of the way. When Tom ran down to stop Gray, he was overpowered and Margo shot Gray to keep him from killing Tom. Though Margo assured Tom and everyone that she was alright, the incident rattled Margo to the core.

=== Rivalry with Emily Stewart ===
Meanwhile, Casey continued to flounder without direction, which irked Margo, who kept badgering him into getting a job or going back to school. Soon, Casey found the perfect opportunity when he visited the Intruder offices and learned that Emily had fired her assistant. Casey charmed Emily into hiring him, despite Emily's concern that Margo would not approve since Margo hated Emily. Emily was right—Margo did not approve and demanded that Casey quit. To keep the peace, Emily fired Casey. Casey refused to accept that and stood up to Margo. After telling Margo in no uncertain terms that she had no right butting in, Casey asked Emily for his job back. In the meantime, when Casey helped Emily investigate some stolen manuscripts from the university, he was framed. Margo refused to believe Casey's claims of innocence. Casey was quickly vindicated and although he refused to forgive Margo for doubting him, Emily convinced him to forgive her. Emily also convinced Casey to come clean when he told her about the money he stole from the Lakeview for Matt.

Casey confessed the theft to Lisa who had no choice but to tell his parents. After railing at Casey for the theft, Margo told Casey that she would keep silent if he returned to school. Although a stubborn Casey refused, the alternative was returning to prison for violating his parole so Casey had no choice but to comply. Casey's friendship with Emily unnerved Margo and she finally resorted to blackmail to get Emily to stay away. Margo warned Emily that if she didn't back off Casey, she would tell Tom about Emily's recent past as a prostitute. Later, during the week of her twenty-fifth wedding anniversary, Margo got a shock when she returned home unexpectedly to find Emily in a state of undress with Casey. A cold Margo immediately pulled a gun on Emily and threatened to shoot her. Tom came home and was able to defuse the situation. Appalled at the thought of Emily cavorting with Casey, Margo vindictively revealed Emily's hooker past to Tom and Casey. However, Casey knew all about it and didn't care. Not only that, but Casey defied his parents by moving out in order to remain with Emily. Rattled by the revelation of Emily's hooker past, Tom sought for full custody of Daniel. However, when Casey blasted his father for his actions, Tom ultimately backed down.

=== Acceptance of Casey and Emily's relationship ===
When it became clear that Casey would pick Emily over his family, Tom convinced a begrudging Margo that they had to accept the relationship or they risked losing their son. Soon after, Margo was horrified to learn from Casey that he and Emily had impulsively gotten married and Emily quickly denounced it as a mistake. Later, Emily collapsed and was rushed to the hospital after a confrontation with Margo. Casey became ill as well and Margo deduced that the pair had been poisoned by Rick Decker—Emily intentionally and Casey indirectly. Seeing Emily's concern for Casey, Margo took her to Casey's room. Chris found an antidote to the poison and Emily and Casey made a full recovery. Having seen their devotion to each other, Tom and Margo finally accepted the relationship. However, Emily still felt uneasy about marrying Casey under the influence of Decker's drug and convinced him to get their marriage annulled.

=== Adam's death ===
Later, the Hughes family received word that Adam had been killed in a bombing in Afghanistan. At the same time, Riley, a mysterious young man claiming to be Adam's friend, insinuated himself into their lives. Though Margo instantly welcomed Riley into their home, Casey was suspicious. Later, after Margo was shot in the line of duty, Riley rushed to her side and called her "mom"—revealing that he was Adam. Margo confided in Casey who confronted his brother. According to Adam, he'd been in a bombing in Afghanistan and had to have facial grafts that had changed his appearance. Adam had used the opportunity to return to Oakdale to seek forgiveness from his family. Casey was angry that Adam had lied to his family yet again, but for Margo's sake, agreed not to tell Tom. At this point, Tom became suspicious of Margo's interest in Riley and suspected that something was going on. Though Casey continually harped on Adam to tell the truth, Adam was unwilling to reveal himself. However, when Tom tried to get Riley to leave town, Margo finally confessed that Riley was Adam. After a furious Tom confronted his son, Adam turned himself in to the police. Thanks to testimony from Maddie, stating that her having buried him alive may have led to his violent behavior, and a plea of leniency from Tom, the case against Adam was dismissed. However, Adam disappointed his family again by skipping town without saying goodbye.

=== Swapping houses and final episode of As The World Turns ===
Afterwards, Margo concentrated on her professional life. On the personal front, things were finally looking bright for Casey when he announced that he was enrolling in law school and he was engaged to Alison Stewart. Though happy for Casey, Margo was devastated when he and Alison opted to move to Carbondale to attend school. Not knowing how to live in her home with her children gone, Margo and Katie decided to switch houses—Katie would move into Margo's and Margo and Tom would make new memories in the house Katie previously shared with Brad.

== See also ==
- Tom Hughes and Margo Montgomery
