= 2002 Emmy Awards =

2002 Emmy Awards may refer to:

- 54th Primetime Emmy Awards, the 2002 Emmy Awards ceremony honoring primetime programming June 2001 – May 2002
- 29th Daytime Emmy Awards, the 2002 Emmy Awards ceremony honoring daytime programming during 2001
- 30th International Emmy Awards, honoring international programming

Preceded by 2001	Emmy Awards; 2002	Succeeded by 2003
