= Barbara Ryan =

- As the World Turns character
- Portrayed by: Judi Rolin (1971); Barbara Stanger (1971); Donna Wandrey (1971–72); Colleen Zenk (1978–2010)
- Duration: 1971–72; 1978–2010
- First appearance: 1971
- Last appearance: September 17, 2010
- Created by: Irna Phillips and David Lesan
- Introduced by: Freddie Bartholomew (1971); Joe Rothenberger (1978)
In-universe information
- Other names: Barbara Stenbeck; Barbara St. Clair; Barbara Munson; Barbara Dixon; Barbara Montgomery; Barbara Coleman
- Occupation: Former fashion designer and owner of BRO
- Parents: Chuck Ryan; Jennifer Sullivan
- Siblings: Rick Ryan; Melinda Grey; Frannie Hughes
- Spouse: James Stenbeck (1980–83, 2002); Gunnar St. Clair (1983–84); Hal Munson (1988–91, 1993–97, 1999–2001); John Dixon (1997–98); Craig Montgomery (2001–02); Henry Coleman (2010–)
- Children: Paul Ryan; Jennifer Munson; Will Munson; John Dixon, Jr.
- Grandchildren: Jennifer Ryan; Eliza Ryan; Johnny Montgomery; Hallie Munson
- Aunts and uncles: Kim Sullivan Hughes
- First cousins: Sabrina Hughes; Andrew Dixon; Christopher Hughes II

Barbara Ryan is a fictional character from the American CBS soap opera As the World Turns. In the early 1970s, Barbara was played by a succession of actresses, but the actress most associated with the role is Colleen Zenk, who played her since September 1, 1978. She is portrayed as a heroine who experienced many tragedies, mostly at the hands of her controlling ex-husband, the villainous James Stenbeck (Anthony Herrera). Barbara is the daughter of Jennifer Sullivan.

Over her 32 years on the show, Barbara has been shot through the heart, nearly gored by a bull in Spain, kidnapped 15 times, married nine times, burned in a chemical explosion and jumped out of a three-story window.

After years of being a heroine, Barbara was transformed when writer Douglas Marland came on board at ATWT in 1985. He decided to make Barbara a "bitch" of sorts, and had her break up long standing couple Tom Hughes and Margo Montgomery. This proved to be unpopular, and Marland quickly reverted the character back to being "good" by pairing Barbara with Oakdale police detective (and later chief) Hal Munson (Benjamin Hendrickson). Again, in the early 2000s (decade), writer Hogan Sheffer turned Barbara back into a scheming villain. Burned up in a chemical explosion in 2001 with the actress donning special effects make-up for a full year, Barbara returned to her evil ways and culminated in her committing crimes such as drugging a police officer and hiring a hit man to murder Rose D'Angelo (Martha Byrne). She then kidnapped three of her female adversaries (Emily Stewart, Carly Tenney and Rose D'Angelo). Though the character subsequently reformed and became a more or less law-abiding presence in Oakdale, she remained manipulative and devious.

Entertainment reporter Lisa Joyner described the character as a "sultry vixen" who'd made the transition from "helpless victim to scheming villain", while TV Guide's Michael Logan called the character Oakdale's "firecracker".

== Creation and casting ==
=== Casting ===
The character of Barbara Ryan was first seen on the show in 1971, she was played by Judi Rolin. Barbara Stranger took over the role briefly that same year, before being played by Donna Wandrey from 1971 to 1972. After six years off screen, Barbara was recast and returned to the show, now played by dancer and actress Colleen Zenk. Zenk began the role on September 1 of that year and stated her maternal grandparents never owned a television until her debut on As the World Turns. "Those were the people I heard from. Back then there was no internet, there was no way of getting any information from anyone until the fan mail started pouring in, which it did. I received a nice response from the beginning. I think that’s because I very quickly settled into such an easy rapport with Don Hastings and Kathy Hays, and Helen Wagner, and then eventually, after awhile [sic] with Eileen Fulton," she said.

=== Awards ===
Zenk has never received a Daytime Emmy for her work however was nominated for Outstanding Lead Actress in both 2002 and 2011. In 2001, she was nominated for Outstanding Supporting Actress.

== Storylines ==
Barbara Ryan is first introduced to the Hughes family when her mother, Jennifer, marries Bob Hughes. Barbara is very happy for her mother and likes having Bob as a stepfather. Barbara has a fairly uncomplicated teenage life, but suffers from bulimia at age 16.

Barbara returns to town in 1978, having just graduated from art school and fleeing a failed romance with Steven Farrell. Unable to live without her, Steven follows her to Oakdale and gets a job in the cardiology department at Memorial. The couple rekindle their romance, but Steven has a secret past, one he cannot share with the woman he loved. The year ended on a sad note when, on the night Nancy Hughes was to give an engagement party for the happy couple, Steven leaves town, leaving Barbara to nurse a broken heart.

She then began dating her former stepbrother Tom Hughes. At about this time, Barbara began receiving mysterious phone calls. Soon, she was forced to confess a deep, dark secret—three years earlier Barbara had an affair with the aristocratic, very rich James Stenbeck, and became pregnant with his child. Believing he did not want to raise the child, whom she named Paul, she gave him to her friend Claudia Colfax to raise. Claudia's husband, Raymond, proved to be an abusive man and, with Tom's help, Barbara was able to secure custody of Paul. Just then, James came to Oakdale himself. Barbara resisted a romantic reunion with the dashing aristocrat and became engaged to Tom, but Stenbeck soon learned that he was Paul's father and confronted her on her wedding day. Barbara tearfully left Tom at the altar and ran off to the Caribbean with James and they made plans to marry.

The Stenbeck fortune first became a problem for the couple when Charles Ivenstrom, whose daughter was pregnant by James' brother, tried to kill them so that his grandchild-to-be, rather than Paul, would inherit the money. Barbara was shot, but survived and she and James married in her hospital room. Following Charles' arrest, James's brother accused James of marrying Barbara so James would have access to Paul's inheritance. James assured Barbara that this was ridiculous. For Barbara, the marriage proved disastrous. Seeing nothing wrong with having a wife and a mistress, James began an affair with Margo Montgomery, Barbara's private nurse. In addition, James decided to supplement his fortune by smuggling drugs and stolen jewelry through the fashion company he bought for Barbara. Finally, Barbara found out about the affair and the illegal activities. Though James was able to talk Barbara into giving their marriage a chance, it became clear that Barbara was becoming disenchanted.

At the same time she suspected that James was having another affair, this time with Dee Stewart, Barbara started having bizarre visions of a previous life. The visions consisted of a woman who looked just like her, named Bianca, who resided in Paris with her husband Jason (who looked remarkably like James). Bianca would later learn Jason was carrying on an affair with the maid, Daphne (who looked like Dee Stewart). Later, Barbara's flashbacks started to have a mysterious blonde Englishman coming to Paris who, for some reason, was very angry with Jason. The mysterious blonde Englishman challenged Jason to a duel (with Jason getting the upper hand, at first). In the summer of 1982, Bianca (Barbara's doppelganger) learned this mysterious blonde Englishman's name, Geoffrey. Not long after, at the funeral of James's brother, Lars, Barbara was shocked to see a man who looked exactly like Geoffrey: Gunnar St. Clair.

Gunnar surprised the Stenbecks by claiming to be James's cousin. He produced records from the St. Clair orphanage showing that Greta Aldrin, James's ex-nanny, brought him there after his parents died, because James's father didn't want him living in the same house. James ordered an investigation and was determined not to let Gunnar claim any rights to the Stenbeck fortune. In early September 1982, the Stenbecks were surprised when Gunnar showed up at the penthouse. Electrified by his presence, Barbara mistakenly called him Geoffrey. Later, at Fashions, Gunnar saw Barbara holding a blue dress and suggested that she buy it. Later, she had a vision of Bianca wearing a similar dress for Geoffrey. Whenever she wore the blue dress, Barbara felt loved. Barbara was convinced these visions were premonitions of the end of her marriage, and she was afraid of her attraction to Gunnar. Barbara headed for her cabin in Michigan to get away. When Barbara got into her car at the cabin, a masked man put a gun to her head. Barbara's captors were Charles Ivenstrom, the man who had once ordered her death, and his daughter, Ingrid, the widow of James's younger brother, Lars. Ingrid blamed Barbara and James for her husband's death. Lars and James would have had to share the Stenbeck fortune, and Ingrid said Lars futilely begged James to keep him out of bankruptcy. Desperate, Lars got drunk and died in the hiking "accident." In revenge, Ingrid vowed to kill Barbara, and her father, Charles, was helping her get back the money that was rightfully hers.

The kidnappers mistook Gunnar for James, and demanded $2 million in cash for Barbara. They insisted Gunnar make the drop, but captured him as he approached. Alone in a dark cellar, on Halloween Eve, Gunnar and Barbara declared their love. They escaped and hid in a nearby barn. As they slept, a little girl wandered in and told her parents, who contracted the police. James arrived to find Gunnar and Barbara sleeping in each other's arms. Alone with Barbara, James accused her of having an affair with Gunnar, which she denied. Meanwhile, Gunnar found a painting of a woman who bore a striking resemblance to Barbara/Bianca and bought it, telling Barbara the picture meant they were destined to be together. Then he proposed. Soon after, Barbara overheard John Dixon yelling at Dee that Barbara was a fool to stay married to the man who ran him down and who was having an affair with Dee. Shocked, she told James she and Paul were moving out. James's attorney, Mr. Hoyt, warned James about losing control of the Stenbeck fortune. He begged Barbara to reconsider and warned that she and Gunnar would never get custody of Paul. Barbara ignored him and went to Switzerland with Gunnar, leaving Paul with her Aunt Kim and Kim's husband, Nick. Meanwhile, the intensity of the visions was becoming much, with people noticing how distracting she was becoming. Finally Lisa, her partner in Fashions, suggested that Barbara see a psychiatrist, Dr. Ben Forrest.

This suggestion fell right into James's plans for Barbara since he decided to use this as a means to get Barbara locked away so he'd get control of Fashions. Later, he was found dead in Australia. Afterwards, Barbara next set her sights on newspaperman Brian McColl. Soon, the couple fell in love and made plans to marry. Paul was vehemently against the marriage and caused trouble. Continually argumentative, at one point, Paul hit Brian several times and when Brian raised his hand, instinctively, to hit back, Barbara walked in and railed into Brian. Disgusted at Barbara's tendency to let Paul dictate her life, Brian broke off the engagement. With the encouragement of her friend (and Brian's former stepmother) Lisa McColl, Barbara tried to go to his place to take him back, only to find Shannon O'Hara in the room wearing Brian's bathrobe. From that moment, Barbara vowed to no longer be victimized by men. Soon a different Barbara Ryan emerged. Later, Barbara attempted to seduce Tom Hughes, now married to Margo Montgomery (James's former mistress). Though her attempt was unsuccessful, she did put a cramp in the Hughes marriage after lying to Margo that she and Tom had had sex. Since Tom had been drunk on the day in question, he had no idea if it was true or not. When Tom "confessed" to Margo, she left town for several months, leaving Barbara free to comfort a heartbroken Tom.

At the same time, Barbara's jealousy caused her to be a thorn in Shannon's side when she decided to do some digging to get the dirt on Shannon. Her efforts paid off when she learned Shannon had a husband. Vindictively wanting to stop Shannon's wedding to Brian, Barbara located Shannon's husband, Duncan McKechnie, and brought him to Oakdale. Soon after, Barbara got the shock of her life: James was alive! He apparently had survived the fall out of the airplane with the use of a parachute. After his initial appearance, James was able to evade the police for weeks. In the meantime, Barbara bonded with the detective in charge of the case, Hal Munson. Around Hal, Barbara finally started loosening up and enjoying the simple pleasures in life, such as a hockey game and a can of beer. Eventually, James was apprehended and put on trial. However, with the help of Lucinda Walsh, he was exonerated. Like Barbara, Lucinda was only a means to an end.

While working at Walsh Enterprises, he started embezzling funds in order to regain his fortune. It didn't take long though for the authorities to go after him again for illegal business dealings in Europe. On the run again, James blackmailed his ex-lover Emily Stewart into helping him escape and manipulated Paul into keeping his whereabouts secret. However, James couldn't hide his dangerous nature from Paul for long and in order to spare John Dixon's life, Paul agreed to go with his father. For James, the police were waiting for them. After a standoff in a cabin at Ruxton Hills, James apparently died in fire, his body burned beyond recognition. Although there were a slew of suspects, Barbara would end up being arrested when her gun was found to be the one that killed James and Tonio Reyes reported that he saw her enter the house right before he heard gunshots. For her own part, Barbara had no memory of the night and couldn't defend herself. She was convicted of the crime and sent to jail. Luckily, she was exonerated when it was discovered that the body in the house wasn't James; it was his accomplice whom James must have murdered to fake his death. Her ordeal over, Barbara married Hal in an elegant ceremony at Lakewood Towers. Soon after their marriage, Barbara figured out that Hal was Adam Hughes's biological father, since she knew Tom was out of town when Margo apparently conceived, and knew about Hal & Margo's affair. Fearing losing Hal to Margo, Barbara decided to keep this a secret from Hal.

At the same time, a teenaged Paul was offered an internship at Montgomery & Associates, something Barbara wouldn't stand for since she didn't want Paul working around James's older lover, Emily. However, at this point, Emily accidentally learned about Margo's true conception date and blackmailed Barbara into letting Paul work there—or she'd tell Hal the truth. In the end, Margo told Hal the truth. Shocked, Hal distanced himself from Barbara, as he tried to deal with the revelation. In the meantime, James resurfaced again and returned to Oakdale to retrieve his son. By now, James truly wanted Paul to be close to him and was disconcerted that Paul hated him. Lurking in the shadows, James learned of Paul's affair with Emily. Disgusted by the affair, he decided to murder Emily. However, this time, Paul rescued the intended victim and shot his father dead. During the course of the trial, Paul and Emily kept the truth to themselves, leaving Barbara to believe that Emily killed James. Afterwards, the pair told the truth and Paul left town.

A few years later, tragedy struck when Jennifer was stricken ill with pneumonia which proved fatal. Though devastated, Barbara was strong and faced her daughter's death with dignity. Tragedy struck again mere months later when Hal was killed in the line of duty. From that point on, Barbara focused her energies on her sons. To that end, she decided to grant Will and Gwen their fondest wish—a baby. Gwen had learned she was infertile and attempts at in vitro fertilization (IVF) were unsuccessful. At the same time, Gwen's brother's girlfriend, Sophie, was expecting a baby who Cole Norbeck wanted no part of. Barbara decided the perfect solution was for Gwen to adopt Sophie's baby and arranged a deal with Gwen's mother, Iris, to buy Sophie's baby. Knowing there was no love lost between Gwen and her brother, Barbara kept the identity of the birth mother a secret. Alison Stewart noted some similarities between the Munson's adoption and Sophie's and went to Barbara. Barbara lied that she would look into the matter and then tried to cover her tracks. Alison Stewart did some digging around and discovered the truth. She went straight to Will and Gwen who confronted Barbara. Though she denied it at first, she was forced to admit to it but insisted that she acted out of love. Will disowned his mother.

In the end, the Munsons did end up adopting Sophie's baby whom they named Hallie Jennifer. Will refused to let Barbara attend the christening. In fact, he didn't want her to be in Hallie's life at all. Soon, Lisa asked Barbara if she was all right because Lisa had noticed that Barbara seemed to be having difficulty speaking. At Lisa's suggestion, Barbara consulted her doctor and was horrified to learn that she had oral cancer. Though her doctor told her to tell her family about her condition, Barbara decided to keep it to herself. At this point, Will and Gwen were contending with Sofie, who wanted Hallie back, while Paul had just been injured in a car explosion and Barbara did not want to be a burden on her sons. After weeks of going through radiation alone, Barbara's secret was discovered by Sophie when Sophie overheard Barbara make an appointment for treatment. At Sofie's insistence, Barbara, finally, told her family about her condition. Although, Will and Gwen were poised to reconsider their move out of Oakdale, Barbara refused to let them put their lives on hold for her.

At this point, Paul invited Barbara to stay with him at Fairwinds. Sofie, who offered to take care of Barbara when Gwen and Will were gone and who had already befriended Paul, spent many hours at the mansion where Barbara discovered Sofie's talent for jewelry design. Recognizing that Sofie had talent, Barbara and Paul decided to subsidize her new business venture. During this time, Paul and Sofie developed an attraction to each other and, one night, depressed about losing Meg, Paul had sex with Sofie. Although both Barbara and Paul tried to tell Sofie that the fling meant nothing, the girl became obsessed with Paul. Worried about Sofie's attraction to Paul, Barbara decided that Meg was the better choice and tried to convince Meg to reunite with Paul, and even hired Meg as her private nurse. As Paul and Meg got closer, Sofie's obsession with Paul went to dangerous heights with her switching Barbara's medication in an effort to get Meg into trouble. Though she almost died of an overdose, Barbara recovered and witnessed Paul's proposal to Meg. Soon after being threatened by Barbara, Sofie mysteriously disappeared. Determined that her son be happy, Barbara led Paul and Meg to believe that her health was failing so they would get married ASAP. With only Barbara in attendance, Paul and Meg married near the rose garden at Fairwinds. That night, the police caught Paul transporting Sofie's lifeless body and he was booked on murder charges. Meg insisted to Barbara that Paul was guilty and implied that he was covering up Barbara's crime. Barbara denied murdering Sofie and, on her lawyer's suggestion, enlisted Rick Decker's help in proving Paul's innocence.

Rick reported that whoever killed Sofie was a professional in the use of needles—leading Barbara to suspect Meg. Not long after, Barbara was visited by Hallie's father, Cole Norbeck, who informed her that he saw her murder Sofie. Since she had been taking pain medication, Barbara couldn't dismiss Cole's claim that she killed Sofie in a drug induced stupor. It soon became clear that the reason Cole wanted money was to support his drug habit. After blackmailing Barbara for money, Cole got desperate and ultimately kidnapped her for ransom. It soon became clear that Cole, a drug user, had killed Sofie. Luckily for Barbara, she got the upper hand and knocked Cole out with his own drugs. Cole escaped but was apprehended by the police. James Stenbeck also returned to Oakdale in August 2008, and soon enough, Barbara had confronted him, learning he had stolen her money to get Paul to ask him for help and not her. Barbara then closed all of her accounts, liquifying the money and guaranteeing Paul that he would get the loan he asked for. In late September, James Stenbeck 'died' after falling from a lighthouse on an island. It was also revealed that Dusty Donovan was still alive and well having been captured by James nine months previous.

At that time, Barbara went to New York for a business trip. She returned on November 10 and met up with Dusty, only to find he had met a girl that he thought resembled his late wife and Barbara's daughter Jennifer. Barbara and Paul were completely insulted and left Dusty. The following year, Barbara learned shocking news—Henry Coleman was James’ illegitimate son. Shortly after this startling revelation, James was apparently killed and Henry was named heir to the Stenbeck fortune. Since Paul was uninterested in fighting for his inheritance, Barbara took it upon herself to make sure Paul got the inheritance that he deserved. However, Henry later seduced Barbara and then agreed to split the inheritance 50/50. Afterwards, Barbara was almost poisoned by Henry’s mother, Audrey. Luckily, Henry found out what his mother was up to and stopped Barbara from drinking the poison.

Later, the spector of James returned in the form of researcher Mick Dante. The much younger Mick was convinced that he was James Stenbeck. Though Mick tried to convince everyone that James had taken a youth serum developed by Dante, in reality, James had brainwashed Dante. After Dante turned himself in, Paul again declared that he wanted nothing from his father and gave the remainder of his fortune to Henry. Henry and Barbara fell into bed again and soon began relishing their commitment free affair. However, it didn’t take long for the pair to develop genuine feelings for each other. Unfortunately, Henry was torn between his feelings for Barbara and his newly returned, lover, Vienna. Vienna stunned Henry by proposing to him, and they had sex. When Henry told Barbara about it, she dumped him. Though he was seemingly committed to Vienna, Henry kissed Barbara when he learned that she was cancer-free.

Afterwards, Barbara discovered that Vienna was trapping Henry into marriage by falsely claiming to be pregnant. Before she had a chance to interrupt the wedding, Barbara was chloroformed and held captive. Barbara’s captor turned out to be Gwen’s mother, Iris, who demanded bank codes from Barbara, and forced her to write a short note to ask her family to give her time alone. Upon seeing the note, Henry became convinced that Barbara had been kidnapped. Barbara discovered a walkie-talkie and somehow tuned the frequency to Jacob's baby monitor. As she hoped, Henry heard the message when he was babysitting Katie’s baby. Iris then relocated Barbara to the wine cellar at Fairwinds. Emily stumbled upon Barbara in the wine cellar. Iris tied Emily up and insinuated to Will and Gwen that Emily was behind Barbara's disappearance. Later, Henry caught Iris strutting around in Barbara's clothes and deduced that Iris had kidnapped Barbara and Emily. The family smelled smoke at Fairwinds and rescued Emily and Barbara from the cellar. Gwen detained Iris at the Lakeview bar, and the police arrested Iris. Barbara suddenly wanted nothing to do with Henry, who'd chosen Vienna over her, but after a poignant talk with Katie, Barbara accepted Henry's marriage proposal. Henry and Barbara received the cold shoulder when they announced their engagement to her sons, who were opposed to her marrying James Stenbeck's son. Henry withdrew his proposal, but Barbara insisted that genes wouldn't hold them back. When Paul learned that his mother had planned an impromptu wedding, he surprised the couple by gathering the family to witness the union. Later, Barbara decided to dissolve BRO so that she could concentrate on her new life with Henry.

== Character development and impact ==
=== Anthony Herrera's return ===
She also recalled the secrecy in the return of Barbara's supposedly dead husband, James Stenbeck. It was also the first return-from-the-dead storyline the show tackled. "It was a shock for everyone in the production as well. They kept it so quiet. They eliminated the name “James” from every single script. Nobody knew he was coming back except Doug Marland and Bob Calhoun, our executive producer at the time. I was told the day before. The crew didn’t know. Obviously wardrobe did because they had to put him in the monk’s robe. They snuck him into the building, they snuck him on set, and it wasn’t until “Hello Barbara” that anyone knew James and Anthony [Herrera] were back. It was cool."

=== Change in character ===
“Barbara went so far off the back burner that she went off the stove.”

— Colleen Zenk, We Love Soaps

In 1985, writer Douglas Marland stepped aboard the team, transforming the character of Barbara. Zenk recalls the change in character literally happened "overnight." "I could never figure out what Doug saw. But when I look back at myself at that young age before Barbara turned into Bad Barbara, I can see some of that. I can see how he could say, “That girl could have an edge if I gave it to her.” We didn’t have a young bad girl on the show at that point. I think he positioned me perfectly for that. "Barbara was in the middle of everything - stirring the pot, making things happen, causing grief for everyone around her, making the same mistakes over and over. She found Hal, fell in love with him, and couldn’t figure out how to put that marriage first. The one thing I always loved about the character, that they never forgot, is that Barbara never learned from her mistakes." However, when Marland died in 1993, Zenk said the character was under-utilized to the point that screen time for the character had effectively "died." “Barbara went so far off the back burner that she went off the stove.”

=== Barbara under Hogan Sheffer ===
Apart from her character's romance with John Dixon, Zenk was rarely seen in for most of the 1990s. It wasn't until head-writer Hogan Sheffer brought the character to the front burner yet again did audiences see Barbara again. "Hogan took one look at me and said, “What do you mean you’re not using this character? Look at the history of this character! Look at this actress, she looks okay! Let’s see what she can do.” So they looked at what I could do. He completely resurrected Barbara, and I became his muse." "I had so much fun, I can’t tell you. I had the time of my life with Hogan. When he left it nearly killed me. I was really upset. I didn’t think I would ever get back up to that level where he had me. I was wrong. "A lot of people felt Hogan destroyed the show because of the way he told story. I completely disagree. I thought he completely revived us and saved us from the chopping block all those years ago. We weren’t looking good there for awhile [sic]. He saved us, and he certainly saved Barbara, that’s for sure." A pivotal storyline, running for one year, was Barbara's deformity caused by a chemical explosion.

=== Oral cancer ===
In January 2008, Zenk brought her battle with oral cancer to the screen. Writers diagnosed Barbara with the disease, and Zenk said she felt it was her responsibility to get the message out about the illness. "So I made it my duty to get out there and talk as much as I can about oral cancer. The thing with oral cancer, and the reason so many people don’t know about it, is because there are not that many survivors."

=== Cancellation of As the World Turns ===
In December 2009, CBS decided to cancel As the World Turns after 54 years on air. Zenk, who had played Barbara for 32 years, said the show could have been saved if it was marketed better.

I think we needed to have focused on core characters awhile back. I think we needed to stop focusing on story lines that the audience didn’t find as important. I’m not blaming anybody. But I think the focus needed to be on the core families and the core characters because they are the reasons the audience tunes in. The core characters are the reasons the audience is bereft right now. Because we are family to all these people, to generations of viewers. We also needed to find ways to incorporate new media early on, to get creative with new media early on. Fifteen years ago they should have been thinking how to sell it differently. Why didn’t we use the Bell model and go sell these shows abroad the way The Bold and the Beautiful did?
