= Hal Munson =

- As the World Turns character
- Portrayed by: Benjamin Hendrickson (1985–2004, 2005–2006); John Hilner (1994–1995); James Kiberd (2001); Randolph Mantooth (2003–2005)
- Duration: 1985–2006
- First appearance: 1985
- Last appearance: July 12, 2006
- Created by: Susan Bedsow Horgan
In-universe information
- Occupation: Chief of Police of the Oakdale Police Department
- Parents: Harold Munson, Sr.; Louise Munson
- Sisters: Claire Munson Shelby
- Spouse: Lynda Graves (1979); Barbara Ryan (1988–91, 1993–95, 1998–2000); Carly Tenney (1998); Emily Stewart (2004–05)
- Sons: Adam Munson; Will Munson; Parker Snyder
- Daughters: Nikki Munson
- Adoptive daughters: Jennifer Munson
- Grandsons: Johnny Donovan (adoptive)
- Granddaughters: Hallie Munson (adoptive)
- Nieces and nephews: Tess Shelby; Cassie Shelby; Becky Shelby; Dave Shelby; Ben Shelby

Hal Munson (born Harold Todd Munson, Jr.) is a fictional character that appeared on the American soap opera As the World Turns. He was played by Benjamin Hendrickson from 1985 to 2004 and 2005 to 2006.

He was described as a "tough-but-gentle" police chief by People magazine.

== Casting ==
Hendrickson was asked to play the role of Hal Munson by then head writer, Susan Bedsow Horgan. His tenure with the show ran until 2004, when he quit the show over a contract dispute.

He returned to the show in 2005 with his character now being thrust into storylines which involved his children. The following year, Hendrickson died by suicide; he shot himself in the head. The show dealt with the death off-screen in October 2006 by having the character shot in the line of fire, and his family and friends celebrating his life and years in Oakdale. Of Hendrickson, co-star Ellen Dolan said, "He was a marvelous and gifted man, I just know him to be a wonderful man with a big heart – we are all part of a tight family here. I am just heartbroken."

== Storylines ==
Hal Munson, upon arriving in Oakdale, immediately started investigating James Stenbeck. In the course of the investigation, he met and fell in love with James's ex-wife, Barbara Ryan. Their relationship was strained, though, because of her preoccupation with her son, Paul, so Hal started confiding his problems with his partner, Margo Hughes. Soon, he and Margo became best friends and later began an affair when Margo’s husband Tom left Oakdale for a job in Washington D.C. Soon after, Margo ran away from Oakdale and Hal married Barbara. Margo came back months later with a child she claimed was hers and Tom's. Ten months later, Hal learned that Adam was actually his! Hal was angry with everyone for keeping this secret. He was especially angry with Barbara and felt betrayed by her since she had known the truth. Before he had a chance to forgive her, Barbara ran off to Europe. Hal decided to let, Adam be raised by the Hughes family and he decided to give Barbara another chance when she returned. Unfortunately, he found out that Barbara had an affair in Europe and, when she told him the child she was carrying wasn't his, he divorced her. After the divorce, Hal left Oakdale to do some undercover work while Barbara gave birth to a daughter, Jennifer. Hal returned a few years later. By this time, his anger toward Barbara had softened and they had sex. Soon after, Hal left again on another undercover assignment and was presumed dead. When he resurfaced, he found out that his night with Barbara produced a child, Will. Hal married Barbara at his father's house.

The marriage ended when Hal learned that Barbara lied about being stalked. Hal lived alone for a while, until he learned of the existence of a daughter he never knew about, Nikki. He and Nikki formed a close father-daughter relationship and Nikki persuaded Hal to tell Adam the truth about his parentage. A few years later, a lonely Hal found himself attracted to Carly Tenney and impulsively married her. Very quickly after, Carly got pregnant. Their marriage started to fall apart however, thanks to resistance from Nikki who believed that Carly was up to something. Meanwhile, Hal started to suspect that Carly was still in love with her old boyfriend, Hal's friend and subordinate, Jack Snyder. Later, Hal was shocked to learn that Carly lied about the paternity of her baby and quickly divorced her. Although Carly quickly married the man she believed to be the father (John Dixon), and gave birth to a baby boy named Parker Joe, it was soon discovered that Parker was Hal's son after all.

As his marriage to Carly was floundering, Hal's friendship with Barbara grew and the two remarried. Their happiness wouldn't last long however. When Jen started dating Bryant Montgomery, Hal vehemently objected and was overprotective of her. His preoccupation with Bryant and Carly put a strain on his marriage. When Bryant's father, Craig, returned to town, Hal was convinced that Craig was involved in illegal activities and put all his energies into the investigation. Soon Hal's investigation drew a wedge between him and Barbara and she began spending time with Craig. Barbara's involvement made Hal even more determined to arrest Craig and soon Barbara left him.

To his chagrin, Barbara married Craig. Hal floundered for a while in self-pity. Then Barbara was suddenly caught in an explosion. Determined to prove that Craig was behind it, Hal started working with Emily Stewart. Though he wanted Craig to be guilty, the more he investigated, the more circumstantial the evidence became. Finally, with Emily's help, the real culprit was caught. In the course of the investigation, Hal and Emily grew closer and started dating. Though he knew she had a tendency to be unethical and manipulative, he found himself intrigued by her sensitive side and asked her to move in with him. Later, Emily suddenly disappeared! At first appearing as if she'd simply skipped town, that didn't seem right to Hal, especially when he learned that Carly was missing also. When he learned that a vindictive Barbara was behind the kidnappings, he bitterly wrote her out of his life and forbade from seeing their son. During the course of the investigation to find the missing women, Hal was suddenly kidnapped and drugged by James. Returning to Oakdale a few weeks later, he was, unbeknownst to everyone, now working for Stenbeck!

After spending weeks as James's henchman, Hal became lost when James was rendered unconscious after being caught in a fire. Knowing that he had to protect James, Hal kidnapped him from the hospital, hid him in the basement of the police station, and asked John Dixon to make sure that he lived. Knowing he had to help James, but not having James to tell him what to do, Hal went to Barbara for help. Fortunately, Barbara was able to crack through the programming by mentioning Emily and Hal's children. Suddenly realizing that James was controlling him, a still unstable Hal went to James and decided to make him pay. Luckily, Barbara and Margo found Hal before he was able to shoot James and they talked him into turning himself in.

Free of Stenbeck's influence, Hal was deprogrammed at the hospital and, during his recovery, was reunited with Emily who had escaped with Barbara's help. Telling Barbara that they would never be together, Hal continued his relationship with Emily and soon married her. Over the next few years, Hal found himself caught up in various law enforcement and family matters, which at times coincided. While Hal was spending more and more time at the station, Emily was feeling neglected. Although Emily tried to find time to spend with Hal by visiting him at the station, Hal continually pushed her away since he was so focused on his work. Things finally came to a head when, after standing up Emily's sister at the altar, Chris Hughes informed Hal that he and Emily were in love! Horrified that Chris would just impulsively blurt that out, Emily denied actually being in love with Chris but confessed, to a shocked Hal, that in her loneliness, she flirted with Chris, collimating in only a few kisses. After hearing her tearful explanation, Hal realized that he hadn't been fair to Emily and forgave her. Unfortunately, the Munson marriage would continue to deteriorate. A year later, after an argument, Emily moved and then had an affair with Paul. Disgusted, Hal informed her that their marriage was over.

After the dissolution of his marriage, Hal focused on his children. He was there to support Jennifer when she gave birth to Craig's child and comforted her when it was believed the child was dead. He rejoiced when it was discovered that Craig had switched babies and Jen's son, whom she later named Johnny, was alive and being raised by Gwen Norbeck. Also involved in the drama was Will, who had fallen in love with Gwen. Will, a senior in high school, shocked his family by marrying Gwen. Though Hal agreed with Barbara that Will was too young, nothing could be done about it. Though Will wanted to live off his trust fund, Hal agreed that was a bad idea. Instead, he offered to support the newlyweds as long as they finished school. At the same time, Carly and Jack were having marital problems and Hal decided that Parker would be better off with him. By the summer of 2006, everything seemed perfect. Jen was now happily engaged to Dusty Donovan, who adopted Johnny; Will and Gwen had both graduated (or in Will's case, working on his GED) and were now staying at Carly's. Then tragedy struck—Jen was stricken with viral pneumonia which led to heart failure. Suddenly, Jennifer was dying. Emotionally distraught, Hal nonetheless kept it together to be strong for Jennifer. After watching Jennifer marry Dusty, Hal said a heartfelt goodbye. That night, his princess was gone. At Jen's funeral, Hal sent Parker back to live with his mother.

A few months later, tragedy struck when Hal was in Washington, D.C., on assignment. During the course of a robbery, Hal was caught in gunfire and, while heroically saving a fifteen year old kid, was killed instantly.
