= Scott Holmes =

American stage and television actor

- Holmes in 1984
- Born: May 30, 1952 (age 74); West Grove, Pennsylvania, U.S.
- Education: Catawba College
- Occupations: Stage and television actor
- Spouse: Pamela Holmes

Scott Holmes (born May 30, 1952) is an American stage and television actor. He is best known for playing district attorney Tom Hughes in the American soap opera television series As the World Turns.

== Life and career ==
Holmes was born in West Grove, Pennsylvania, and was raised in Oxford, Pennsylvania. During his high school years, he served as student council president, and was a member of the school's drama club. After graduating from high school, he attended Catawba College, earning his BA degree in drama and music. He began his stage career in the 1970s, and spent a season with the Pittsburgh Civic Light Opera. He appeared in numerous stage plays such as Evita (as Che), Jerome Kern Goes to Hollywood, Grease and The Rink.

Holmes then began his screen career in 1984, playing Dave Greenberg, in the ABC soap opera television series Ryan's Hope until 1985. From 1985 to 2010, he then played district attorney Tom Hughes, the husband of Margo Hughes, in the CBS soap opera television series As the World Turns. In 1986, he appeared in the television film Adam's Apple, and in 1994, he starred as Sam Dallas in the Broadway play The Best Little Whorehouse Goes Public.

== Personal life ==
According to Soaps.com, Holmes is married to Pamela, and he resides in a farmhouse in New York with his wife.
