= Ellen Dolan =

American actress

- Born: October 16, 1955 (age 71); Monticello, Iowa
- Years active: 1981–present
- Children: 1

Ellen Dolan (born October 16, 1955 in Monticello, Iowa, USA) is an American actress.

== Early life and career ==
Dolan earned her B.A. and M.F.A. degrees in theater from the University of Iowa in Iowa City. While working toward her bachelor's degree, she spent a summer studying dramatic arts at the Webber Douglas Academy of Dramatic Art in London.

Dolan is best known for two daytime soap opera roles. She originated the role of Maureen Reardon Bauer on Guiding Light, and played the role from 1982 to 1986. She replaced Hillary Bailey Smith in late 1989 as Margo Hughes on As the World Turns. Dolan played Margo until 1993, when she moved to California to pursue nighttime television work.

Dolan returned to As the World Turns in 1994 and played Margo until the show ended in 2010.

In 1992, she was nominated for a Daytime Emmy for Outstanding Lead Actress.

Her additional television credits include the made-for-television movies Mother's Day, Mothers, Daughters and Lovers with Helen Shaver and Claude Akins, and Dancing with Danger, with Cheryl Ladd and Ed Marinaro.

== Theatre ==
Her stage career began in 1980 at the Milwaukee Repertory Theater with roles such as Katrin in Mother Courage. Her subsequent roles in numerous regional productions have included Maggie in Cat on a Hot Tin Roof at the Virginia Stage Company, Mary in How the Other Half Loves at the Pennsylvania Stage Company, and Clelia in The Nerd at the Capitol Repertory in Albany, NY. She also started a theater company in New York called The Studio Three Group. She joined a repertory group called the WorkShop Theater Company in 2004 and has had leading roles in several mainstage productions there.

== Filmography ==
=== Film ===
Year	Title	Role	Notes
2012	Molly's Girl	Ginger	Feature film
2013	After Life	Lynn	Feature film
2014	A Place For Heroes	Lillian	Feature film
2015	The Southside	Joanie	Feature film
2016	A Timeless Love	Charlie	Feature film

=== Television ===
Year	Title	Role	Notes
1982-1986	Guiding Light	Maureen Reardon Bauer #1	Daytime serial (contract role)
1987	Leg Work	Nina	Episode: "Life Itself"
1989	Another World	District Attorney Morgan Graves	Episode: #6271
1989	Mother's Day a/k/a Lethal Error	Lucille	TV movie (aired on Christian Broadcasting Network Family Channel)
1989	Mothers Daughters and Lovers	Erica	TV movie (aired on NBC)
12/1989 - 1/1993; 6/1994 - 9/2010	As the World Turns	Margo Montgomery Hughes #3	Daytime serial (contract role) For Daytime Emmy info, see Awards and nominations section below for details
1993	Angel Falls	Lola Faye	Episode: "Only the Lonely"
1993	CBS Schoolbreak Special	Janet Deevers	Episode: "If I Die Before I Wake"
1994	Walker, Texas Ranger	Trish Kingston	Episode: "Something in the Shadows"
1994	Walker, Texas Ranger	Trish Kingston	Episode: "Something in the Shadows: Part 2"
1994	Dancing With Danger	Wendy	TV movie (possible direct-to-video)
2010	Law & Order: Special Victims Unit	Lisbeth Sander	Episode: "Beef"
2011	Selling New York	Herself	Episode: "Smells Like a Deal"
2024 (post-production)	'Them' †	Marge Mindley	Original comedy series on YouTube Comedy

Key
†	Denotes television productions that have not yet been released

== Awards and nominations ==
Year	Award	Category	Work	Result
1993	Daytime Emmy Award	Outstanding Lead Actress in a Drama Series	As the World Turns	Nominated

== Personal life ==
Dolan and businessman Doug Jeffrey had their first child, a daughter, Angela Emmett Jeffrey (born 2000).

After ATWT ended, Dolan and Jeffrey sold their New York City home, the sale of which was featured as a story on the reality TV program Selling New York.

== See also ==
- Tom Hughes and Margo Montgomery
- Supercouple
