= 2007 Emmy Awards =

2007 Emmy Awards may refer to:

- 59th Primetime Emmy Awards, the 2007 Emmy Awards ceremony that honored primetime programming during June 2006 – May 2007
- 34th Daytime Emmy Awards, the 2007 Emmy Awards ceremony that honored daytime programming during 2006
- 28th Sports Emmy Awards, the 2007 Emmy Awards ceremony that honored sports programming during 2006
- 35th International Emmy Awards, honoring international programming

Preceded by 2006	Emmy Awards; 2007	Succeeded by 2008
