= 2003 Emmy Awards =

2003 Emmy Awards may refer to:

- 55th Primetime Emmy Awards, the 2003 Emmy Awards ceremony honoring primetime programming June 2002 – May 2003
- 30th Daytime Emmy Awards, the 2003 Emmy Awards ceremony honoring daytime programming during 2002
- 31st International Emmy Awards, honoring international programming

Preceded by 2002	Emmy Awards; 2003	Succeeded by 2004
