= 2004 Emmy Awards =

2004 Emmy Awards may refer to:

- 56th Primetime Emmy Awards, the 2004 Emmy Awards ceremony honoring primetime programming June 2003 – May 2004
- 31st Daytime Emmy Awards, the 2004 Emmy Awards ceremony honoring daytime programming during 2003
- 32nd International Emmy Awards, honoring international programming

Preceded by 2003	Emmy Awards; 2004	Succeeded by 2005
