= 2006 Emmy Awards =

2006 Emmy Awards may refer to:

- 58th Primetime Emmy Awards, the 2006 Emmy Awards ceremony honoring primetime programming June 2005 – May 2006
- 33rd Daytime Emmy Awards, the 2006 Emmy Awards ceremony honoring daytime programming during 2005
- 27th Sports Emmy Awards, the 2006 Emmy Awards ceremony honoring sports programming during 2005
- 34th International Emmy Awards, honoring international programming

Preceded by 2005	Emmy Awards; 2006	Succeeded by 2007
