= Colleen Zenk =

American actress (born 1953)

- Born: January 20, 1953 (age 73); Barrington, Illinois, U.S.
- Education: Catholic University of America
- Occupations: Actress; model
- Years active: 1975–present
- Spouses: Michael Crouch (m. 1983–1986) Mark Pinter (m. 1987; div. 2010)
- Children: 3

Colleen Zenk (born January 20, 1953) is an American actress. She is known for her role as Barbara Ryan in the CBS daytime soap opera, As the World Turns, a role she played from September 1978 until the show ended in September 2010. She received three Daytime Emmy Awards nominations for her performance.

== Early life ==
Zenk was born in Barrington, Illinois, and studied drama at The Catholic University of America.

== Career ==
She appeared in print ads and TV commercials at the beginning of her career, including several commercials for Kellogg's.

In 1975, Zenk moved to New York City and made her stage debut as well began screen tests for Indiana Jones, Grease, and Superman. After 12 failed soap opera screen tests and a bit part on Ryan's Hope, Zenk finally landed the role of Barbara Ryan in the CBS daytime soap opera, As the World Turns in 1978.

In 1980, she made her big screen debut appearing in the horror film, Christmas Evil. In 1982, she appeared with Albert Finney and Carol Burnett, in the musical film Annie directed by John Huston. In 1982, Zenk was also the focus of a commercial for L'eggs pantyhose.

In 1993, Zenk went to star along with fellow daytime performers Deidre Hall and Leslie Charleson in the leading roles of the NBC made-for-television movie Women on the Ledge.

=== As the World Turns ===
Zenk's most notable role was as Barbara Ryan on As the World Turns. After auditioning for several soap operas, including The Edge of Night, Guiding Light and Search for Tomorrow, Zenk was signed to a contract at As the World Turns and assumed the role of Barbara in 1978. She played the role for 32 years, until the show ended in 2010.

In the early years of Zenk's run on As the World Turns, her character, Barbara, was tormented by her criminal ex-husband, James Stenbeck (played by Anthony Herrera). For a brief period in the mid-1980s, the character of Barbara, as written by award-winning head writer Douglas Marland, became a complex romantic vixen.

In 2001, then head-writer Hogan Sheffer took the character in a drastically different direction after the character suffered burns in a fire which destroyed her face (and more deception by then-husband Craig Montgomery). Sheffer was quoted in a 2006 interview in a cover-feature article in The New Yorker that he wanted to give Zenk, who he felt was an "under-utilized gem of an actress", more to do than just pour coffee with children underfoot. She was nominated for a Lead Actress Daytime Emmy Award in 2001, 2002. and 2011, and also voted Best Villain by Soap Opera Digest in 2003. Sheffer won the Emmy Outstanding Writing in 2001, 2002, 2004 and 2005, in part with stories featuring Zenk's work.

Zenk was prominently featured in the show's special 50th anniversary episode "Seven Divas on a Bus" in April 2006, and also in several special comedy episodes over the years.

=== Stage ===
In 1980, Zenk co-starred on Broadway with musical theatre legends Chita Rivera and Donald O'Connor in the sequel to Bye Bye Birdie titled Bring Back Birdie.

In the summer of 2005, Zenk came out of her self-imposed musical theater retirement and starred as Dolly Levi in a regional tour of Hello Dolly! at the Academy Theater in Meadville, Pennsylvania, and the Pocono Playhouse. Due to overwhelming audience response, she was asked to reprise the role that fall at the Bucks County Playhouse in New Hope, Pennsylvania.

In June 2007, three weeks after her initial three surgeries for oral cancer, in the 50th anniversary production at Little Theatre on the Square of Sullivan, Illinois. The production was Stephen Sondheim's Follies, and Zenk played Phyllis Stone. Recovering from tongue reconstruction and on heavy pain medication due to radiation burning and side effects, Zenk sang and danced with the 35-piece orchestra, and brought down the house.

In April 2011, only four months after more cancer surgery to her tongue, she debuted her one-woman show Colleen Zenk: LIVE at Bob Egan's New Hope, to great critical acclaim. She was featured in a new Off-Broadway show from the Araca Group, Odyssey – The Epic Musical at the American Theatre of Actors in October 2011. Then, the long-awaited New York debut of her one-woman show Still Sassy premiered at Feinstein's at the Regency in New York City October–November 2011.

She was one of the many producers of the Broadway revival of Godspell. In late 2012, she starred in the off-Broadway world premiere of the stage version of the bestselling memoir, Marrying George Clooney, Confessions from a Mid-life Crisis. She kicked off the 2012–2013 theatre season for CAP21 in their "Concerts for CAP21" Benefit Series with a "standing room only" night of her one-woman show Still Sassy. In 2013, she portrayed iconic actress Tallulah Bankhead in the Regional Premiere of Matthew Lombardo's play Looped at STAGEWORKS/Hudson.

The world premiere of Michael Slade's play Family Shots at the Human Race Theatre Company in 2015 earned her a Lead Actress in a Play DayTony nomination. That same year, she played Polly Wyeth in back-to-back productions of the Pulitzer Prize nominated play Other Desert Cities by Jon Robin Baitz, directed by Dan Foster at Theatre Workshop of Nantucket and the Hudson Stage Company in New York.

In June 2018, Zenk returned to the role of Dolly in Hello, Dolly! at The Little Theatre on the Square.

In 2020, Zenk made several appearances on the YouTube show The Locher Room, which facilitates discussions with entertainment figures, including actors, writers and producers from soap operas.

=== Later screen appearances ===
In 2014, she appeared as Joan in the 5th-season episode "Loose Lips" of the CBS show Blue Bloods.

On Thurston, a Western web series, she portrayed town madam Agnes Snead, garnering two Lead Actress nominations from the Indie Series Awards. Zenk also appeared in supporting roles on the web series Tainted Dreams and Milgram and the Fastwalkers. In April 2018, the series After Forever debuted on Amazon; Zenk played Dr. Robbins.

In 2023, Zenk was cast in a recurring role as Jordan Howard on the CBS daytime soap opera, The Young and the Restless. She departed the role in 2025.

== Personal life ==
Zenk married musician and actor Michael Crouch in 1983.

In 1987, she married actor Mark Pinter, whom she met on the set of ATWT. Together, they raised 6 children (four from previous marriages and two from their union). They made their home in Fairfield County, Connecticut.

In May 2010, Zenk filed for divorce citing abandonment and irreconcilable differences. The divorce was finalized in August 2010.

=== Health issues ===
In 2007, Zenk was diagnosed with oral cancer. Through a series of four surgeries including brachytherapy radiation, Zenk's stage II cancer was treated. In October 2007, Zenk appeared on CBS's The Early Show to publicize the risk factors of oral cancer and to stress the importance of early screening.

She partnered with the Oral Cancer Foundation to do additional interviews in print and TV media as well as produce public service TV announcements (PSA) on the importance of early detection. In 2008, CBS donated approximately $500,000 in airtime minutes on their national affiliates for the PSA to play.

Her story was told in depth in Woman's Day magazine in March 2009. In the article, Zenk said it appears her cancer was most likely caused by HPV-16, a strain of a common sexually transmitted virus that can potentially also cause cervical cancer.

Zenk revealed that she contracted COVID-19 in 2020, with a lengthy recovery. period.

== Filmography ==
=== Film ===
Year	Title	Role	Notes
1980	Christmas Evil	Binky	
1982	Annie	Celette	
1993	Woman on the Ledge	Steffi	Television film
2013	Libby	Libby	Short film Los Angeles Shorts International Film Festival Award for Best Short Film
2015	About Scout	Female Dinner Guest	
2015	Line to the Wall	Elizabeth Stone	Short film
2016	The Comedian	Herself	
2018	Milgram and the Fastwalkers 2	Whit Wilkerson	
2019	American Criminal	Judge Witaker	

=== Television ===
Year	Title	Role	Notes
1978	Ryan's Hope	Nurse	Episode dated January 30, 1978
1978—2010	As the World Turns	Barbara Ryan	Series regular Nominated — Daytime Emmy Award for Outstanding Lead Actress in a Drama Series (2002, 2011); Nominated — Daytime Emmy Award for Outstanding Supporting Actress in a Drama Series (2001); Nominated — Soap Opera Digest Award for Outstanding Villainess in a Drama Series – Daytime (2005)
2012—2013	Thurston	Agnes Snead	Web series Nominated — Indie Series Award for Best Lead Actress - Drama (2014–2015); Nominated — Indie Series Award for Best Ensemble - Drama (2015)
2014	Blue Bloods	Joan	Episode: "Loose Lips"
2016	Tainted Dreams	Sofia DiGiacomo	Web series
2018	After Forever	Dr. Robbins	Episode: "Back on the Bike"; Nominated —International Academy of Web Television Award for Best Ensemble Performance (Drama)
2023–2025	The Young and the Restless	Jordan Howard	Recurring role
