= 2005 Emmy Awards =

2005 Emmy Awards may refer to:

- 57th Primetime Emmy Awards, the 2005 Emmy Awards ceremony honoring primetime programming during June 2004 – May 2005
- 32nd Daytime Emmy Awards, the 2005 Emmy Awards ceremony honoring daytime programming during 2004
- 26th Sports Emmy Awards, the 2005 Emmy Awards ceremony honoring sports programming during 2004
- 33rd International Emmy Awards, honoring international programming

Preceded by 2004	Emmy Awards; 2005	Succeeded by 2006
