= Benjamin Hendrickson =

American actor (1950–2006)

- Born: August 26, 1950; Huntington, New York, U.S.
- Died: July 3, 2006 (aged 55); Huntington, New York, U.S.
- Education: Juilliard School (BFA)
- Occupation: Actor
- Years active: 1976-2006

Benjamin Hendrickson (August 26, 1950 – July 3, 2006) was an American actor known for playing Harold "Hal" Munson Jr., the Chief of Detectives for the fictional town of Oakdale on the daytime soap opera As the World Turns.

== Theater and film ==
Hendrickson was born in Huntington, New York. He studied at the Juilliard School as part of the institution's first drama division class and was a founding member of John Houseman's The Acting Company.

Prior to his television appearances, Hendrickson acted in theatre. From 1973 to 1984, he appeared in a host of productions that included The Elephant Man (taking over the title part in 1981 after serving as David Bowie's understudy), Awake and Sing and Strider.

Hendrickson also acted in feature films. He originated the role of Frederick Chilton, Hannibal Lecter's pompous, incompetent psychiatrist, in the 1986 film Manhunter; the part was later played by Anthony Heald in the Silence of the Lambs (1991) and Red Dragon (2002) and Raúl Esparza in the TV series Hannibal (2013-2015). Hendrickson's other credits include Dreams Don't Die (1982), Russkies (1987), Regarding Henry (1991), Consenting Adults (1992) and Spanking the Monkey (1994).

== Television ==
Hendrickson made appearances on daytime television in the early 1980s; his credits included Another World, Texas, and a notable role on Guiding Light as the villainous Silas Crocker.

However, Hendrickson was best known for playing Harold "Hal" Munson Jr., the Chief of Detectives for the fictional town of Oakdale on the long-running daytime soap opera As the World Turns.

He played Hal for over 20 years, from October 1985 to September 2004 and from June 2005 to July 2006. Hal was initially a short-term role, but as Hendrickson joked, when he "impregnated the leading lady" (the character of Margo, then played by Hillary B. Smith), he signed a contract with a longer term.

Hendrickson won the Daytime Emmy Award for Outstanding Supporting Actor for playing Hal in 2003. During his acceptance speech, he honored his source of moral support with a joke: "To my mother, who scrimped and saved to send me to Juilliard to study the classics... I'm sorry."

== Death ==
Hendrickson's body was discovered on July 3, 2006, at his Huntington, New York, home. The Suffolk County Police labeled his death a suicide; his body had been found with a gunshot wound to the head.

=== On screen ===
Since daytime soap operas are taped several weeks before airing, Hendrickson's final scenes on As the World Turns were broadcast July 12, 2006, nine days after his death. The July 12 episode featured a brief dedication at the end alerting viewers to his death.

A July 5, 2006, TV Guide article indicated that the role would not be recast; the show addressed the fate of the character onscreen in October 2006, and had Hal Munson die in the line of duty.

== Filmography ==
Year	Title	Role	Notes
1976	The Time of Your Life	Nick	TV movie
1982	Dreams Don't Die	Attorney	TV movie
1982	The Demon Murder Case	Father Carelli	TV movie
1986	Manhunter	Dr. Frederick Chilton	
1986	Adam's Apple	Mitlock	TV movie
1987	Russkies	Sgt. Kovac	
1991	Regarding Henry	Daniel, Phyllis' Boyfriend	
1992	Consenting Adults	Jimmy Schwartz	
1994	Spanking the Monkey	Tom Aibelli	
2002	Mr. Smith Gets a Hustler	Mr. Lapp	
