= Leg Work =

American crime drama television series

- Main title screen
- Genre: Crime drama
- Created by: Frank Abatemarco
- Starring: Margaret Colin; Frances McDormand; Patrick James Clarke
- Composer: Michael Omartian
- Country of origin: United States
- Original language: English
- No. of seasons: 1
- No. of episodes: 10 (4 unaired)

Production
- Running time: 60 minutes
- Production companies: Treasure Island Productions; 20th Century Fox Television

Original release
- Network: CBS
- Release: October 3 – November 7, 1987

Leg Work is an American crime drama television series created by Frank Abatemarco that premiered on CBS on October 3, 1987. Ten episodes of the series were produced, of which six were aired prior to the show's cancellation. The final episode aired on November 7, 1987. The cable network TV Land later aired the remaining four episodes.

== Synopsis ==
Set in New York City, the show's main character was Claire McCarron (played by Margaret Colin), a former Assistant D.A. turned private investigator. A policeman's daughter (Colin was a policeman's daughter in real life), she drove around town in a Porsche 911 Cabriolet but lived beyond her means and often struggled to make a living from her fledgling detective agency. The show also starred Patrick James Clarke as her brother and NYPD lieutenant Fred McCarron, and Frances McDormand as Willie Pipal, her friend who still worked for the DA's office.

== Cast ==
- Margaret Colin as Claire McCarron
- Frances McDormand as Willie Pipal
- Patrick James Clarke as Fred McCarron

== Episodes ==
No.	Title	Directed by	Written by	Original release date	Prod. code
1	"Pilot"	Richard Michaels	Frank Abatemarco	October 3, 1987	5G79
2	"Things That Go Bump in the Night"	Ray Danton	Deborah R. Baron	October 10, 1987	5G01
3	"The Best Couple I Know"	Peter H. Hunt	Mark Lisson	October 17, 1987	5G02
4	"All This and a Gold Card Too"	Peter H. Hunt	Story by : Frank Abatemarco; Teleplay by : Frank Abatemarco & Deborah R. Baron	October 24, 1987	5G05
5	"Blind Trust"	John Nicolella	Frank Abatemarco & Mark Lisson & Marvin Kupfer & Deborah R. Baron	October 31, 1987	5G06
6	"The Art of Murder"	John Nicolella	Marvin Kupfer	November 7, 1987	5G04
7	"Mystery Woman"	Ray Danton	Janis Hirsch	UNAIRED	5G03
8	"Life Itself"	Dale White	Chaim Laeb	UNAIRED	5G07
9	"The American Dream"	Michael Zinberg	Bruce Graham	UNAIRED	5G08
10	"Peaches"	Dale White	Kathy McCormick	UNAIRED	5G09

== Reaction and ratings ==
Critical opinion was mixed. It was described as having a "somewhat leering tone", but also the "best and brightest of CBS' new series" as well as being a seeming extension of Colin's 1985 lawyer sitcom, the equally short-lived Foley Square (in which Colin had played an assistant district attorney). However even before its premiere, critics anticipated a quick demise due to its difficult programming slot, on Saturday nights opposite NBC's The Golden Girls and Amen. Ratings were indeed dismal, as in its five weeks on the air, Leg Work was always rated within the bottom five network shows every single week. In its final airing it was ranked dead last, 71st out of 71 ranked shows that week.

Despite its brief run, Leg Work was shown in other countries outside of the US. It premiered in the UK on the ITV network (usually in a late Friday night slot) in Spring 1988. It was also screened on Network 10 in Australia.
