= Margaret Colin =

American actress (born 1958)

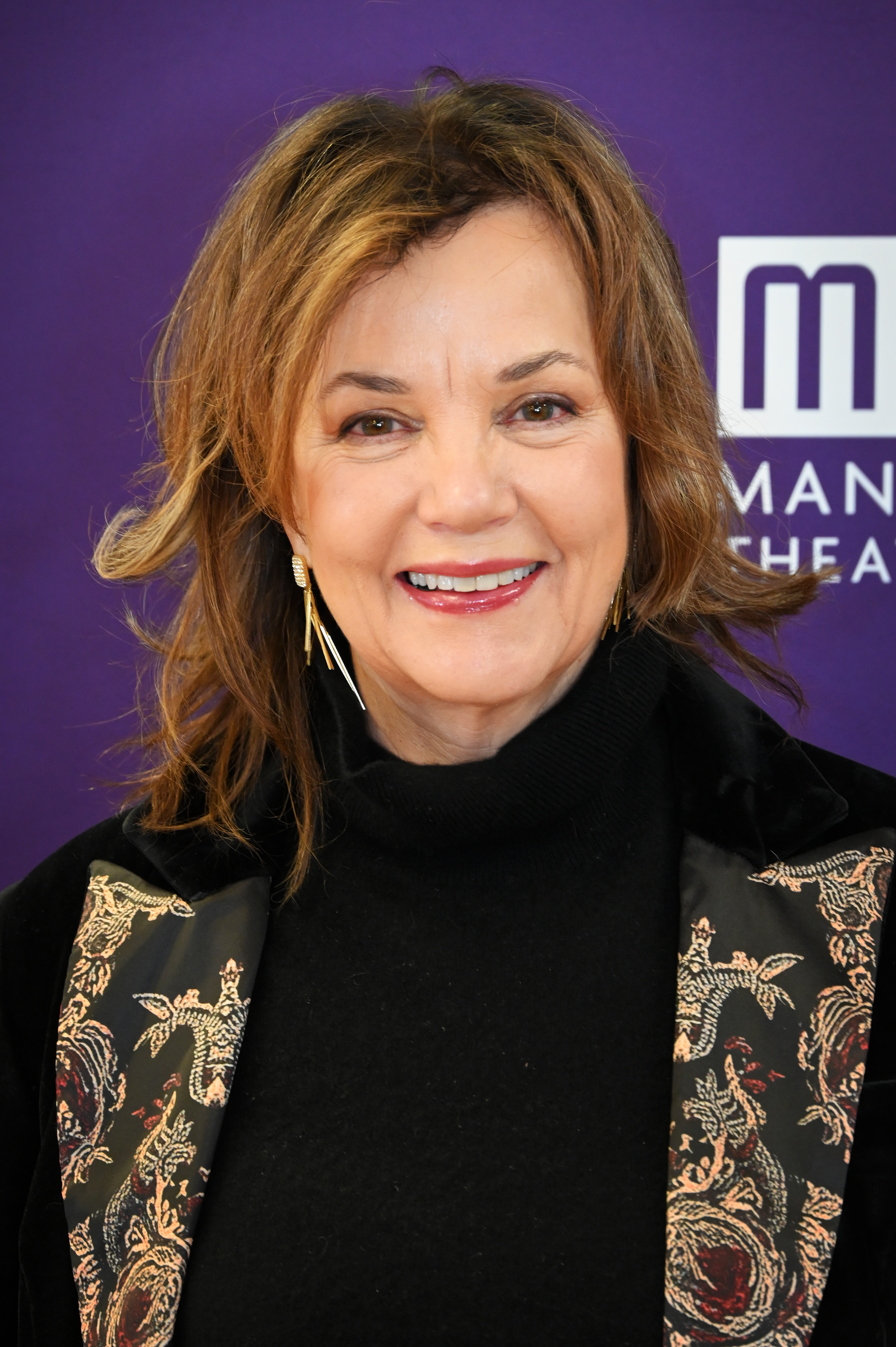
- Colin in 2026
- Born: May 26, 1958 (age 68); Brooklyn, New York, U.S.
- Occupation: Actress
- Years active: 1976–present
- Spouse: Justin Deas (m. 1988)
- Children: 2

Margaret Colin (born May 26, 1958) is an American actress. She is known for her roles as White House Communications Director Constance Spano in the sci-fi film Independence Day (1996), the originating performer of character Margo Hughes on As the World Turns (1980–1983), and her recurring role as Eleanor Waldorf in all six seasons of Gossip Girl (2007–2012).

== Early life ==
Margaret Colin was born in Brooklyn, New York City, and was raised in Baldwin, New York, on Long Island. She is of Irish descent and was raised in a large Catholic family. She graduated from Baldwin Senior High School in 1976, and after attended Hofstra University.

== Career ==
Colin began her acting career in the soap opera The Edge of Night, playing an heiress and former terrorist. In seven months on that show, her character survived seven murder attempts and ended up marrying her stepbrother. She followed that role with a longer stint on As the World Turns, originating the role of Margo Montgomery, a character that endured nearly 30 years.

She has appeared on a number of primetime television shows, starting with Foley Square, Leg Work, and several early episodes of Chicago Hope. She played Lisa Wiseman on the 1999 series Now and Again, with Eric Close and Dennis Haysbert. In 2003, she appeared in an episode of Law & Order: Special Victims Unit titled "Tortured", playing a mother/bakery owner who was later arrested for abetting a murder.

From 2007 to 2012, Colin played the recurring role of Eleanor Waldorf, mother of Blair Waldorf, on the teen drama television series Gossip Girl. In the pilot episode, Eleanor was played by One Life to Live actress Florencia Lozano.

Colin has also been in a number of films, some of the most well-known including Something Wild (1986), Three Men and a Baby (1987), The Butcher's Wife (1991), Independence Day (1996), The Devil's Own (1997), Unfaithful (2002), and First Daughter (2004). She also appeared in the play Jackie: An American Life, in which she played Jacqueline Kennedy.

During her 2003 performance of the English play A Day in the Death of Joe Egg on Broadway, Colin smoked her way through the second half of the show and dedicated the performance to Mayor Michael Bloomberg in defiance of the state's smoking ban. After the play finished its run, she gave up smoking.

In 2017, Colin appeared as a recurring character throughout the sixth season of the HBO comedy series Veep, playing fictional CBS News anchor Jane McCabe. Along with her fellow cast members, Colin won the Screen Actors Guild Award for Outstanding Performance by an Ensemble in a Comedy Series. In 2019, she reprised her role as McCabe in the seventh season premiere of Veep and again in the series finale.

Colin performed on Broadway as Mrs. Mullin in the 2018 revival of Carousel.

== Personal life ==
Colin met actor Justin Deas when he played her love interest, Tom Hughes, on As the World Turns. They were married in January 1988. The couple have two sons, Sam and Joe, and Colin is stepmother of her husband's daughter from his first marriage. The family moved to Upper Montclair, New Jersey in the late 1990s.

She is an anti-abortion activist and was formerly the honorary co-chair of Feminists for Life, an organization opposed to abortion. Colin is an honorary board member of the group Feminists for Nonviolent Choices.

== Filmography ==
=== Film ===
Year	Title	Role	Notes
1986	Pretty in Pink	English Teacher	
1986	Something Wild	Irene	
1987	Like Father Like Son	Ginnie Armbruster	
1987	Three Men and a Baby	Rebecca	
1989	True Believer	Kitty Greer	
1990	Martians Go Home	Sara Brody	
1991	The Butcher's Wife	Robyn Graves	
1993	Amos & Andrew	Judy Gillman	
1994	Terminal Velocity	Joline 'Jo'	Uncredited
1996	Independence Day	Constance Spano	
1996	Milk & Money	Lorraine	
1997	The Devil's Own	Sheila O'Meara	
1997	Time to Say Goodbye?	Kristen Hamstra	
1998	The Adventures of Sebastian Cole	Joan Cole	
2002	Blue Car	Diane	
2002	Unfaithful	Sally	
2004	First Daughter	Melanie MacKenzie	
2006	A Broken Sole	Nan	
2007	Happenstance	Beth	Short film
2008	Deception	Ms. Pomerantz	
2008	iMurders	Carol Uberoth	
2009	The Missing Person	Lana Cobb	
2012	Camilla Dickinson	Mona Rowan	
2012	Backwards	Mrs. Brooks	
2014	Kelly & Cal	Janice	
2014	You Must Be Joking	Linda Schwartz	
2015	Stealing Chanel	Constance Borden	
2016	Equity	Attorney Cahn	
2022	The Road to Galena	Margaret Kenney	

=== Television ===
Year	Title	Role	Notes
1979	The Edge of Night	Paige Madison	Series regular, daily soap opera
1980–83	As the World Turns	Margo Hughes	Series regular, daily soap opera
1985–86	Foley Square	Alex Harrigan	Main cast
1987	Leg Work	Claire McCarron	Main cast
1987	The Return of Sherlock Holmes	Jane Watson	TV movie
1987	Warm Hearts, Cold Feet	Amy Webster	TV movie
1988	Magnum, P.I.	Connie Northrop	Episode: "Legend of the Lost Art"
1989	Traveling Man	Joanna Reath	TV movie
1990	Goodnight Sweet Wife: A Murder in Boston	Michelle Caruso	TV movie
1991–92	Sibs	Audie Ruscio	Main cast
1994	Related by Birth	Audie Ruscio	Television special
1994	Chicago Hope	Dr. Karen Antonovich	5 episodes
1995	In the Shadow of Evil	Molly Nostrand	TV movie
1995	The Wright Verdicts	Sandy Hamor	Main cast
1999	Hit & Run	Joanna Kendall	TV movie
1999	Swing Vote	Linda Kirkland	TV movie
1999–2000	Now and Again	Lisa Wiseman	Main cast
2000	Madigan Men	Vonda Madigan	Episode: "Pilot"
2001	Private Lies	Ellen	TV movie
2001	The Familiar Stranger	Elizabeth 'Peachy' Welsh	TV movie
2001	The Wedding Dress	Madeline Carver	TV movie
2003	Law & Order: Special Victims Unit	Mrs. Krug	Episode: "Tortured"
2004	Law & Order: Criminal Intent	Dr. Eloise Barnes	Episode: "Shrink-Wrapped"
2007–12	Gossip Girl	Eleanor Waldorf	Recurring role (seasons 1–5), guest appearance (season 6)
2009	Royal Pains	Lucy Everett	Episode: "Strategic Planning"
2010	Law & Order	Mary Markson	Episode: "Four Cops Shot"
2010	Medium	Kelly Shuler	Episode: "It's a Wonderful Death"
2012	Blue Bloods	Melanie Maines	Episode: "Women with Guns"
2012	Nurse Jackie	Trish	2 episodes
2013	The Good Wife	Rochelle	Episode: "The Seven Day Rule"
2013	Elementary	Natalie Gale	Episode: "Blood Is Thicker"
2014	Gotham	Taylor Reece	Episode: "Viper"
2015	Madam Secretary	Judith Fanning	Season 2 Episode 7: "Catch and Release"
2017–2019	Veep	Jane McCabe	Recurring role (season 6), guest appearances (season 7); Screen Actors Guild Award for Outstanding Performance by an Ensemble in a Comedy Series
2017–2018	Shades of Blue	Linda Wozniak	Recurring role (seasons 2–3)
2019	The Enemy Within	Evelyn Bell	Episode: "Sequestered"
2019	The I-Land	Dr. Stevenson	2 episodes
2021	Chicago Med	Carol Conte	Recurring role (season 6)
2021, 2023	Gossip Girl	Eleanor Waldorf	2 episodes (sequel series)
2022	Three Wise Men and a Baby	Barbara Brenner	TV movie
2024	Three Wiser Men and a Boy	Barbara Brenner	TV movie
2025	Three Wisest Men	Barbara Brenner	TV movie
