= James Stenbeck =

- As the World Turns character
- Anthony Herrera as James Stenbeck
- Portrayed by: Anthony Herrera
- Duration: 1980–1983; 1986–1987; 1989; 1997–1999; 2001–2002; 2004; 2008–2010
- First appearance: February 1, 1980
- Last appearance: September 13, 2010
- Created by: Bridget and Jerome Dobson
- Introduced by: Joe Rothenberger (1980); Robert Calhoun (1986); Felicia Minei Behr (1997); Christopher Goutman (2001)
In-universe information
- Other names: Jimmy Aldrin; Lester Keyes; The Falcon; Marvin Jurrow; Salvatore Chavez; Mark Jennings; Jay Stanhope; Mick Dante
- Occupation: International Businessman
- Mother: Greta Aldrin
- Siblings: Ariel Aldrin Donovan; Lars Stenbeck
- Spouse: Enid Constanza; Barbara Ryan (1980–83, 2002); Karen Haines (1983); Lucinda Walsh (1998–2000)
- Children: David Allen Stenbeck; Paul Ryan; Jordan Sinclair; Henry Coleman
- Grandchildren: Cabot Sinclair; Jennifer Ryan; Eliza Ryan

James Stenbeck is a fictional character on CBS's daytime drama As the World Turns, portrayed by Anthony Herrera starting in 1980. He is often described as a villain. In the series, the character was presumed dead after falling out of an airplane in 1983, but returned four years later.

== Storylines ==
Introduced in 1980 as a widower and controlling ex-lover of heroine Barbara Ryan (who was pregnant with his child), he quickly staked his claim on his family. He caused Barbara to break her engagement with Tom Hughes. James and Barbara married as she gave birth to his son Paul Ryan. However, the marriage turned out to only be James' means to an end. His role as the first Stenbeck husband and father of his generation secured his place as the rightful heir to the family fortune. He began pursuing other women outside of the marriage, including his mistresses Margo Montgomery and Dee Stewart. The Stenbeck family was very wealthy, seeing as how they were heirs to the Swedish throne.

In addition to his adultery, James dabbled in drugs and stolen goods smuggling, using Barbara's business, Fashions Ltd., which he had purchased for her, as a front for his illegal activity. When Barbara learned about all this, the marriage was put at risk; though James managed to calm her down for a time by having Margo sidelined and trying to be more of a husband to her, it soon became even rockier when Barbara grew more disenchanted with James.

Barbara had an infatuation with newcomer Gunnar St. Clair, a Stenbeck cousin she had met at a family event. Eventually she told James she was leaving him for Gunnar, and James, desperate to maintain his hold on the Stenbeck inheritance through Paul, told her she would never get custody of their son. James had a further setback when he discovered that he was not, in fact, the true Stenbeck heir when Greta Aldrin revealed she had switched him at birth with the true Stenbeck heir, giving the Stenbeck heir to an orphanage. In fact, his rival Gunnar turned out to be the true heir to the family fortune. Though James sought to conceal the truth, his nemesis John Dixon had also discovered the secret tape in which James admitted to his sister Ariel Aldrin he was not a Stenbeck.

James launched a series of ploys to keep Barbara and Gunnar (to whom she was now engaged due to her and James undergoing a divorce) from gaining custody of little Paul and learning he was not a true "Stenbeck". His ploys included trying to kill John Dixon by poisoning a jug of water so he would not expose he was not a biological "Stenbeck", and hiring a woman named Mme. Koster poses as "Sylvia", Barbara's housekeeper, to drive Barbara insane and even tried to poison Gunnar numerous times to gain the fortune. When all else failed, James turned to attempt to murder Gunnar by throwing him from a catwalk, but Barbara saved Gunnar when she shot James, and he survived. He attempted to take Barbara to court for attempted murder to gain Paul.

Karen Haines came into the mix when she discovered the truth about James via the tapes in John's safe. However, Barbara's court case for attempted murder went over as James planned, and he gained Paul and the Stenbeck fortune, but Karen, to get her hands on some money, blackmailed James into marrying her in 1982. John, however, soon resurfaced alive and testified to Barbara's sanity (after Gunnar appealed the case with the D.A.). James was not about to let Paul slip away, and invited Barbara to a private bullfighting demonstration in which he planned to have her killed by having a bull trample her while she was in the ring. Gunnar rescued Barbara as James took off to a castle where he would duel with Gunnar in a sword fight. Eventually, James lost and soon was forced to turn over custody of Paul to Barbara, and without the boy, there was no fortune. Karen angrily divorced James (who had fallen in love with her), and she angrily turned to his arch-enemy in, John Dixon, whom she would later marry.

James Stenbeck returned to Oakdale on August 27, 2008, much to the surprise of his family. Around that time, Barbara's money (the Stenbeck fortune) had gone missing and he was being blamed. After Paul found out it was James who had taken the money, James kidnapped Meg Snyder (Paul's pregnant wife) and threw her into a holding dungeon on an island. James wanted Meg and Paul's unborn child as the new Stenbeck heir, but in the dungeon Meg discovered a presumed dead Dusty Donovan very much alive! Dusty admitted he had faked his death around the time he was captured by James. Together, Meg and Dusty tried to hatch an escape attempt, but it failed when Dusty was caught. Meg got to Paul, who eventually returned to the island to save Dusty. Meg, however, was recaptured by James as James began manipulating Paul, making him believe Dusty and Meg were having an affair. Paul, struggling to free himself of James's manipulations, got into a squabble with him inside a windmill while trying to rescue Meg and Dusty. He shot at James, grazing Dusty while the two were struggling over the gun he had aimed at James's head; they struggled all the way to the windmill balcony. This caused Dusty to fall forward onto James, pushing him over the balcony that resulted in James falling to his death, after which Paul, Meg, and Dusty returned to Oakdale, surprising all who believed Dusty to be dead. Lucinda revealed she had known about Dusty faking his death, but did not know James had kidnapped him. Later, after James was said to be cremated, a mysterious tape arrived with the last will and testament of James Stenbeck. On the tape, Paul believed he was to inherit the Stenbeck fortune, but James made it clear there would be a winner and a loser to set the stage for the final showdown, Dusty was cited as the winner having escaped his lockup and Paul the loser. Dusty inherited the Stenbeck fortune, much to Paul's dismay. Around that time, James had begun haunting Paul. However, months later, it became evident that James had again faked his death and was very much alive.

James returned again in August 2009, much to Oakdale's surprise. It was later revealed that he had another son. That son was Henry Coleman! He began manipulating Henry to get him to accept his share of the fortune he would get when James died. James was later arrested after Paul tipped off the police that James was back in town. He was then placed in the Oakdale PD's custody. James died when he was injected with a paralyzing agent by Audrey Coleman, causing his heart to go into an attack. Barbara ordered an autopsy, but it was too late. James's body had already been embalmed and prepared for burial. At the funeral, Barbara, Emily, Paul, and Henry examined James's body to see if he was really dead, and it appeared that he was.

In November 2009, a mysterious figure by the name of Mick Dante appeared to assist Paul Ryan's wife Emily Stewart with getting pregnant. On December 22, 2009, Mick revealed to Barbara Ryan that he was really James Stenbeck. It was later revealed that Mick was not really James, but that James had brainwashed him. On July 28, 2010, Barbara was visited by a hallucination of James while being held captive in a party supply warehouse. On August 27, 2010, Barbara and Henry were shocked to see James appear during their wedding. After the wedding, Paul invited everyone back to Fairwinds to burn photos of James, symbolically exorcising him from their lives.
