= Hillary B. Smith =

American actress

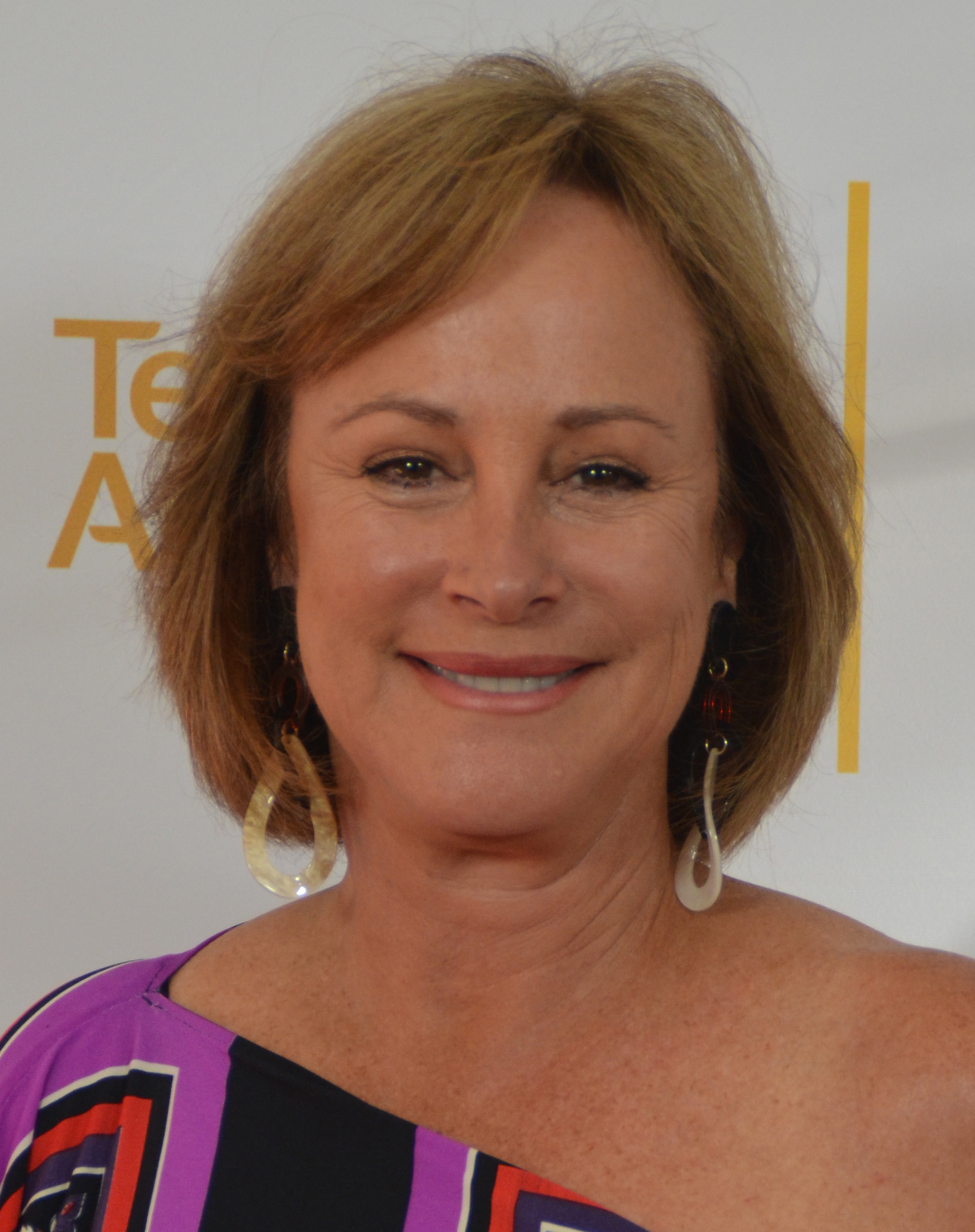
- Smith in 2014
- Born: Hillary Bailey; May 25, 1957 (age 69); Boston, Massachusetts, U.S.
- Occupation: Actress
- Years active: 1981–present
- Spouse: Philip Smith (m. 1983)
- Children: 2

Hillary Bailey Smith (born May 25, 1957) is an American actress, best known for her daytime soap opera roles as Margo Hughes on As the World Turns and Nora Gannon Buchanan on One Life to Live.

== Life and career ==
Smith was born as Hillary Bailey in Boston, Massachusetts. She attended Dana Hall School, Pine Manor College and Sarah Lawrence College. At Sarah Lawrence, she performed in off Broadway and Broadway productions, including The Heidi Chronicles, as a senior. She married Philip Webster Smith, III in 1983. She met her husband at age 14 and married him a few years later after the two reconnected at a friend's wedding. They have two children, a daughter, Courtney and a son, Philip. (As an infant, Smith's son played her on-screen son briefly on As the World Turns.)

Smith is best known for her roles in daytime soap operas. She made her soap debut in 1982, as Kit McCormick on The Doctors and one year later, she assumed the role of Margo Hughes on As the World Turns, a role she played from 1983 to 1989.

After taking maternity leave from acting in 1988, after the birth of her son, Smith returned to daytime television, originating the role of Nora Gannon Buchanan on the ABC soap opera, One Life to Live. She played Nora from 1992 until the series' cancellation in 2012. She later returned to the show in the 2013 The Online Network short-lived reboot. Smith won the Daytime Emmy Award for Outstanding Lead Actress in a Drama Series in 1994 for her performance in One Life to Live. From 1994 to 1995, Smith also appeared in the NBC sitcom Something Wilder.

Smith was a producer of the web soap Venice: The Series, and also appeared as Guya. As a producer, Smith won a Daytime Emmy in 2014. In 2014, Smith was also a supervising producer for the soap opera web series Beacon Hill, and was nominated for a 2015 Daytime Emmy for Outstanding New Approaches Drama Series. In late January 2017, it was reported by Soap Opera Digest and Deadline Hollywood that Smith would reprise her role as Nora on General Hospital.

== Filmography ==
=== Film ===
Year	Title	Role	Notes
1984	Purple Hearts	Jill	
1992	Love Potion No. 9	Sally	
1997	Lifebreath	Edie Weinreb	
2000	It Had to Be You	Jewelry Saleswoman	
2001	Maid in Manhattan	Mrs. Lefferts	
2004	Palindromes	Robin Wallace	
2005	Stanley's Dinosaur Round-Up	Paleontologist	Voice
2019	A Million Happy Nows	Val	Also producer

=== Television ===
Year	Title	Role	Notes
1981	Nurse	Tina	"Best Friends"
1982	No Soap, Radio	Karen	Main role
1982	The Doctors	Kit McCormac	"1.5280"
1983	Baby Makes Five	Susan	"Jennie Gets a Job"
1983	Too Close for Comfort	Donna Stewart	"Family Business"
1983–1989	As the World Turns	Margo Hughes	Regular role
1988	Sharing Richard	Roz	TV film
1991	Acting Sheriff	Asst. D.A. Donna Singer	Unsold TV pilot
1992	Driving Miss Daisy	Florine Werthan	TV film
1992–2013	One Life to Live	Nora Buchanan	Main role
1994–95	Something Wilder	Annie Bergman	Main role
2005	Law & Order: Special Victims Unit	Mrs. Stanton	"Identity"
2009–2016	Venice: The Series	Guya	Main role
2011–2013	Fumbling Thru the Pieces	Ellie Daniels	Web series
2012	The Bold and the Beautiful	Dr. Stacy Barton	Guest role (13 episodes)
2017, 2019	General Hospital	Nora Buchanan	Guest role (9 episodes)
2020	Beacon Hill	Isabel	Guest role (3 episodes)

== Awards and nominations ==
Year	Association	Category	Nominated work	Result
1986	Soap Opera Digest Awards	Outstanding Actress in a Supporting Role on a Daytime Serial	As the World Turns	Nominated
1988	Soap Opera Digest Awards	Outstanding Heroine: Daytime	As the World Turns	Nominated
1989	Soap Opera Digest Awards	Outstanding Heroine: Daytime	As the World Turns	Nominated
1994	Soap Opera Digest Awards	Outstanding Lead Actress	One Life to Live	Nominated
1994	Daytime Emmy Award	Outstanding Lead Actress in a Drama Series	One Life to Live	Won
1998	Online Film & Television Association	Best Actress in a Daytime Serial	One Life to Live	Nominated
1999	Online Film & Television Association	Best Actress in a Daytime Serial	One Life to Live	Nominated
2000	Online Film & Television Association	Best Actress in a Daytime Serial	One Life to Live	Nominated
2000	Daytime Emmy Award	Outstanding Lead Actress in a Drama Series	One Life to Live	Nominated
2001	Soap Opera Digest Awards	Outstanding Lead Actress	One Life to Live	Nominated
2010	Indie Series Awards	Best Performance in a Comedic Role	Venice the Series	Nominated
2011	Indie Series Awards	Outstanding Supporting Actress	Venice the Series	Won
2012	Indie Series Awards	Best Actress (Comedy)	Fumbling Thru the Pieces	Nominated
2012	HollyWeb Festival	Best Actress	Fumbling Thru the Pieces	Won
2013	Indie Series Awards	Best Actress (Comedy)	Fumbling Thru the Pieces	Nominated
2014	Daytime Emmy Award	Outstanding New Approaches - Drama Series	Venice the Series	Won
2015	Daytime Emmy Award	Outstanding New Approaches - Drama Series	Beacon Hill	Nominated
2017	Daytime Emmy Award	Outstanding Digital Daytime Drama Series	Venice the Series	Nominated
