= John Dixon (As the World Turns) =

- As the World Turns character
- Portrayed by: Larry Bryggman
- Duration: 1969–2004; 2010
- First appearance: July 18, 1969
- Last appearance: September 17, 2010
- Created by: Katherine Babecki
In-universe information
- Occupation: Cardiologist: Chief of Staff at Oakdale Memorial Hospital; Member of the Board of Directors of Oakdale Memorial Hospital; Former Resident Administrator of National HealthTac HMO
- Sisters: Annette Dixon Wagner
- Spouse: Kim Reynolds (1973–76); Patricia Holland (1978); Dee Stewart (1979–80); Ariel Aldrin (1981–83); Karen Haines (1984); Lucinda Walsh (1987–91); Barbara Ryan (1997–98); Carly Tenney (1998–99)
- Sons: Duke Kramer; Andy Dixon; M.J. Dixon; Johnny Dixon
- Daughters: Margo Montgomery
- Grandsons: Adam Munson; Casey Hughes
- Granddaughters: Hope Dixon
- Nieces: Pam Wagner

John Dixon M.D. is a fictional character on the American TV soap opera, As the World Turns. He was portrayed by Larry Bryggman from July 18, 1969 until December 14, 2004. Dixon is a cardiologist at Oakdale Memorial Hospital where he is also Chief and Acting Chief of Staff at Memorial Hospital. Though the character stopped appearing in 2004, when Bryggman left the show, no mention was made of his having left town. However, after Larry Bryggman returned to the show on August 27, 2010, Bob Hughes mentioned that Dixon had been at Johns Hopkins. The character remained on the show for its final month, appearing in the last episode in September 2010.

Protégé of the late Michael Shea, Dixon was a constant thorn in the side of many Oakdale residents. John's main rivals through the years were Dan Stewart and Bob Hughes. The son of a working-class family, John was jealous of the affluent Stewarts and Hughes and felt that their lives were served to them on a silver platter. John’s romantic entanglements kept Oakdale on its toes for decades.

== Character history ==
=== Kim Sullivan ===
John's first romantic relationship was with widow Kim Reynolds. John saw Kim as the perfect doctor's wife and was determined to marry her. His opportunity came when he discovered that Kim was pregnant with her brother-in-law, John's professional rival, Bob Hughes's, baby. Although Kim was determined to raise the child on her own, John persuaded her to marry him to give the child a name. Sadly, the child died at birth. Desperate to keep his wife, John blackmailed her into staying married to him by threatening to tell Kim's sister the truth about her pregnancy. Although he was content to stay in a loveless marriage, soon the lack of intimacy got to him and he raped Kim. Having no legal recourse, Kim decided to leave John. After a terrible argument, Kim ran away from John. He followed and fell down the stairs becoming paralyzed. In his debilitated condition, John played on Kim's sympathy and guilted her into staying married to him. However, Kim would find herself falling for John's rival, Dr. Dan Stewart.

John had an obsessive need to stay married to Kim and conspired with Dan's ex-wife, Susan, to keep the two apart. Fed up with John, Kim was ready to leave him when she had an accident that resulted in amnesia. Technically still her husband, John took care of her, isolated her from everyone and convinced her to have a sexual relationship with him. By the time Kim's memory returned, she was pregnant with John's baby and Dan had left for South America. Kim decided to leave John for good despite his pleas to stay for the good of their baby. Losing Kim drove John to the brink of destruction. John started drinking heavily and was finally suspended from the hospital. Shaken by John's behavior, Kim demanded that John only be permitted supervised visits with their son, Andy.

=== Shooting ===
Determined not to let Andy be raised as a Stewart, John kidnapped the boy. When Dan found Andy and confronted John, John went after him with a gun, only to be shot accidentally. John lied and told everyone that Dan tried to kill him and married Pat Holland so that she wouldn't be forced to testify against him. Pat had a change of heart, however, and told the truth in court. Pat then ran away to escape John's wrath and fell to her death. John then got help for his drinking problem and was eventually reinstated at the hospital.

=== Dee Stewart ===
Not long after. John saved Melinda Grey, and Mary and Teddy Ellison in a fire. Mary had been the only person, up to this point, who had befriended John after the disastrous death of his wife, Pat. When John was brought to Memorial with serious injuries, surgery was recommended. The doctor on call was none other than Dan Stewart, so Dan had no choice but to operate on his rival. John developed a blood clot in his lung, and Dan feared he might not make it. Despite their history, Kim prayed for his recovery, since despite everything he'd done, John was still the father of her child. Fortunately, John recovered and later found a friend in Dee Stewart, Dan's younger sister. Dee was young and emotionally fragile following the death of her lover Ian McFarland, who died as they were having sex. John showed great kindness toward her. John's compassion turned to love very quickly.

=== Lyla Montgomery's arrival ===
Unfortunately, it wasn't mutual, as Dee was in love with another man: her brother-in-law Brad. John knew how to control Dee, however, and he convinced her that he was the only man for her. John alienated Dee from her father, David Stewart, and made her believe that her sister was pregnant with Brad’s baby. On September 26, 1980, with nowhere left to turn, Dee hastily married John. None of the Stewarts except for David could bring themselves to watch the brief civil ceremony. Unfortunately, it was obvious to John that his new wife was in love with another and he became possessive toward Dee and flew into jealous rages over Brad. At the same time, an older lover of John's arrived in town, Nurse Lyla Montgomery. The two had a passionate affair in Chicago years ago when they were both students at Northwestern University, until Lyla threw him over for her husband, who was then a candidate for governor, John was still intrigued by Lyla, the woman who got away, but she wanted nothing to do with him and warned him to stay away from her. . Meanwhile, one night John forced his way into Dee's bed and Dee cried rape. In the course of the trial, John maintained his innocence and later learned something startling—Lyla's daughter, Margo, was his daughter.

In the end, John was exonerated when Dee finally admitted that she, while groggy from sleeping pills, willingly had sex with John believing him to be Brad. After the trial, John was run into by a hit and run driver in the Memorial Hospital parking lot. John claimed that he didn't see the driver, but Ellen Stewart was worried that it was David when David disappeared. While John recuperated for a few weeks at Memorial, he put a plan in motion to find out who had hit him. John assumed it was David, but wasn't sure; it could also have been James Stenbeck.

=== Hit and run ===
While John was in his hospital bed, John told his doctor, Jeff Ward, that he was going to move into Margo's cottage at James' estate. At that point, Jeff told John, innocently enough, that he was concerned about Margo having an affair with the married James. Immediately after, John told Jeff that he was blind. Jeff was confused because John had not said anything after the surgery. Jeff could not find any physical reason as to John's blindness, but assumed that he was telling the truth. John was, of course, faking. Margo took pity on her newly discovered father and agreed to take him in. Sure enough, John continued to investigate the hit and run, and found out that James was the culprit while James would continue to try to kill John for several months.

=== "The Loner" ===
About this time, John wrote a fictionalized account of his ordeal, entitled "The Loner." In the meantime, the exotic Ariel Aldrin moved to the apartment next to John. One of John's non-friends, Lisa Miller McColl was writing a gossip column under the pseudonym "Dolly Valentine" and she took great pleasure in manufacturing a romance between her nemesis John and Ariel. John accused Ariel of planning the item, but she denied it. When he invited her to dinner, Ariel accepted, and she told John that American women were too aggressive, but European women, like herself, were "created to make their men happy." John was in total accord. Soon, Armond Elliot, a movie producer friend of Ariel's offered to buy the rights to John's book. Ecstatic, John thought he was going to be rich and maybe even win an Oscar. His interest in Ariel increased. What he didn't know was that Armand was working for James, who quickly shelved the project. Because John had portrayed James as an adulterer and a crook, James wanted to ensure that the movie would never be made. Dee was relieved, too, since John's "fiction" discussed the inability of a woman to have normal sexual responses. James meanwhile, was becoming attracted to Dee. Unable to control themselves, Ariel and John had sex in the linen closet at Memorial. However, Ariel wanted more than a fling, she wanted the financial security a marriage would bring. Ariel did everything she could to make John jealous.

=== Ariel Aldrin ===
Afraid of losing her, John went to purchase a diamond ring. The real ones were too expensive, so he bought a fake one. Dee was relieved that John had found someone and wished the couple luck. After Ariel made John promise her a big wedding, a house and travel, she agreed to be his wife. John told Ariel he wanted custody of his son, Andy, but this was not what she had in mind. When no one wanted to come to their wedding, so John suggested they marry in Jamaica. John wanted his bride to get pregnant, because he never had the chance to see Margo as a child, and a child would give him respectability. However, Ariel's mind was on material things, and when she had her ring appraised, two appraisers verified that the diamond was a fake. Ariel vowed to make John pay. First, she went on a shopping spree, then purchased twenty acres of land and made plans to build tennis courts and a pool. Despite his anger, John was still attracted to Ariel, and after having sex, she showed him the blueprints and told him the house would cost around a million dollars—she'd already made the down payment. John gave Ariel an ultimatum: no children, no house. Ariel agreed to have children, and John threw out her birth control pills.

=== The Stenbeck Fortune ===
It was at this time that John learned something shocking: James Stenbeck was not the heir to the Stenbeck fortune. In fact, he was Ariel's brother. John found out when he discovered that he had a tape of James screaming that he wanted the birth certificates destroyed. James went to Stockholm to retrieve them. John followed and found the birth certificates in Greta Aldrin's house. When James arrived, John escaped out the window with the documents. He put copies in Greta's car, where Greta and James found and burned them. On one of the tapes, John heard Ariel and James talk about getting rid of him. With glee, John began to plot James's ruin. John was out driving when his brakes failed, and he lost control of the car and crashed. When he came to, John told Margo that either Ariel or James was trying to kill him. John cut Ariel out of his will and insurance policies and then he gave Margo sealed envelopes containing copies of James's birth certificates and addressed them to Gunnar St. Clair, Barbara and the New York Times—to be delivered in the event of his death. John pasted cut-out letters to form the question, "When is a Stenbeck not a Stenbeck?" James suspected John, but Ariel was sure John had no idea that James was not a Stenbeck. John's next note read "Sweet Dreams," and with it John sent a copy of James's birth certificate.

Meanwhile, in a rage after John refused to sign the deed to the new house, Ariel destroyed her engagement ring, but told John not to worry—she'd get another one, and this time it would be real. Maggie soon arrived with divorce papers. Ariel heard John listening to the tapes and realized that it was John who was behind the blackmail and the notes. Ariel stole the tapes and played them for James, who went wild. James assured her that he'd handle the situation. After Ariel left, James vowed that he would kill John and read up on undetectable poisons. Then he left a message for John saying Dee's life was in danger. John ran out, and seconds later James poisoned a jug of water on John's desk. John returned to his office and drank some water. Soon, he was lying on the floor, gasping for air. Later, John approached James with a gun and forced James to admit to the murder attempts and said he had proof that James wasn't a Stenbeck.

Instead of killing him, John demanded a million a year for his silence. The first installment of James's blackmail money ($100,000) was missing and Ariel didn't deny stealing it. John handed her the divorce papers and told her she could consider the money her settlement. Meanwhile, Ellen Stewart knew that her husband, David, was headed for John’s and Ellen found John's body on the floor. Afraid that David did it, Ellen called the police. When they arrived, there was blood but no body. A couple of days later, Dee confided in Brian McColl and it was apparent that she was emotional over John's death. She was arrested for the murder of John Dixon. However, when Dee took the stand, a man appeared at the back of the courtroom and shouted at him to stop. When he removed his wig and his beard, everyone in the courtroom gasped, seeing John Dixon back from the dead.

John took great pleasure in telling Ariel to pack her bags and leave. John threatened James with public disclosure of his true identity as Jimmy Aldrin. In the meantime, the manipulative Karen Haines found out why James was being blackmailed and blackmailed him into marrying her, threatening to reveal his true heritage if he didn't.

=== Shooting of Bob Hughes ===
Meanwhile, a mysterious stranger became involved in John’s life. Under the assumed name "Robert Allen," Richard Fairchild III met John on a flight from Detroit. John was still banned from Memorial and, low on research funds, looking for a teaching post. He almost had one but was disqualified because of a condemning recommendation from longtime rival Bob Hughes. Later, Richard engaged John in an eerie conversation about enemies. John thought this stranger was joking when he suggested that he'd kill John's enemy (Bob) if John would kill his enemy (Gunnar St. Clair). Not long after Bob was found bleeding in his office from a gunshot wound. All the doctors were occupied with car-crash victims, and an inexperienced resident asked John to help with Bob. Tom didn't want John near his father but when Bob's condition worsened, John asked Tom if he was going to let his personal feelings get in the way of saving his father's life. After much agonizing, Tom let John perform the surgery. John saved Bob's life, and Bob thanked him but he still could not approve readmitting him to the hospital staff. He did agree, however, to abstain when the board voted on the proposal.

Unfortunately, all evidence in the shooting pointed to John, and he was booked for attempted murder. The evidence was at best circumstantial so Maggie was able to plead for John to be cleared rather quickly. Richard Fairchild remained on the loose. A bit later, Bob was found in a compromising position with the young Marcy Thompson, Though he'd recognized the teen's crush on Bob, when she told him that Bob initiated the kiss, John "suggested" to Marcy that that was sexual harassment, Marcy decided to file charges against Bob for sexual harassment and Kirk's older brother, District Attorney, Brian McColl—while Bob was represented ironically by the same defense attorney who had represented John during his marital rape trial two years earlier, Maggie Crawford. The next day when Richard paid John a visit, John realized it was Richard who had shot Bob, but Richard fled before John could stop him. Knowing that he might try to kill Bob again, John called the police, but neither the police nor Tom believed John's story.

=== Reinstated at Memorial ===
After he was reinstated at Memorial, John began treating a man named Burke Donovan for a heart disease called Wilhelm's Disease. He also became acquainted with James's new wife, blackmailer Karen Haines. With nowhere to go, after James divorced her, Karen took John up on his offer of an extra bedroom. They talked about Burke, and about John's desire to find a cure for Wilhelm's disease so he could save Burke before it was too late. Before the night was over, Karen and John found themselves in each other's arms. Although Burke wanted to keep his condition a secret from his son, Dusty, John finally convinced him to tell the teen about his fatal condition. In the meantime, Karen ended her marriage to James and was given custody of Dusty after Burke’s death. Soon after, John and Karen married since the courts were wary of granting custody to a single woman. John and Karen's married life was not going to be easy. A week after James' death, Maggie was able to get Marcy to admit that Bob had not tried to seduce her, that in actuality it was her that had tried to seduce him. Further, Marcy told the court that it was John who had told her that she should file sexual harassment charges against Bob. Karen was livid when she heard this and started to wonder whether she was married to another man who was as criminally suspect as James was.

Meanwhile, John still had to deal with Richard's anger over John not killing Gunnar. When Karen got wind of John's involvement with the insane Richard Fairchild she refused to speak to or have sex with him for several weeks. Later, Lucinda Walsh had a mild heart attack, and was treated for her heart arrhythmia by John. When Lucinda recovered, she, as a member of the hospital board, convinced the board to keep John at Memorial and Bob reluctantly agreed to give John a few more responsibilities at Memorial. Lucinda became smitten with John, while her teenage daughter Lily, became an item with Dusty. When Karen allowed John back into her bed, she was livid that John kept on bringing up Lucinda Walsh and her riches. Finally, Lucinda started goading Karen that she wasn't good enough wife for a doctor with the capabilities of John Dixon. John also started listening to Lucinda's opinion of Karen and Karen realized that John was drifting from her. After finding out that Dusty's relationship with Lily was on a little more solid ground, and seeing how John seemed to truly be a great parent to Dusty, Karen decided to leave town and left a teenage Dusty in John’s care.

=== Sabrina Fullerton ===
A few years later, an old secret would come back to haunt John. The child that Kim "lost at birth" decades earlier was actually sold at birth by the hospital's administrator, Howard Lansing, and Rick Ryan. Though John didn't find out about this until two years after the child's birth, he kept quiet when he learned that the child died with her parents in a train wreck. Now, twenty one years later, John was being blackmailed by the former administrator. When he talked to Rick Ryan he learned the reason: the child (Sabrina Fullerton) didn't die in the train wreck after all. Realizing that Lansing was trying to murder Sabrina, a regretful John went to the police and finally told them of the deception. Thankfully, though Lansing was arrested, John was cleared of any wrongdoing and Lucinda saved him from being booted out of Memorial.

=== Lucinda Walsh's child ===
Soon after, John, who was angry that Lucinda who had leaked his role in the Sabrina Fullerton affair in her paper, found out Lucinda’s secret: she was actually Sierra Estaban's mother. Knowing that Lucinda didn't want Sierra to know, he blackmailed her. Lucinda proved to be as stubborn as John however and she defied him he told Sierra the truth. Despite their attempts to outmaneuver each other, John and Lucinda fell in love, and, in 1987, they eloped. After the marriage, he moved into the Walsh mansion. Shortly after, John learned that he had a son he never knew about. Duke Kramer was the product of an affair that John had many years ago when he was married to Kim. John was determined to get to know his son and invited him into his home. Unfortunately, Duke's wild ways clashed with Lucinda's sophisticated style and she made plans to get him out of town. Enraged at his wife's cavalier attitude toward his family, John had an affair with his old friend, Susan Stewart. He divorced Lucinda in 1990 as he started to get closer with Kim as they helped Andy through his alcoholism.

=== Colon cancer ===
John then began a romance with Iva Snyder as she adopted Aaron, her nephew. Iva lived in the apartment below John's penthouse and, when she announced that she was pregnant, they got engaged. Iva broke off the engagement when John told Iva's mother the truth about baby Aaron's parentage. Iva then gave birth to John's son, Matthew John, married attorney Jason Benedict and moved to Washington, DC. When John was diagnosed with colon cancer, he decided not to sue for custody. John's bout with cancer brought him closer to his children and, thankfully, the disease went into remission.

=== Malpractice suit ===
John's medical career was nearly destroyed, in 1995, by Lisa Grimaldi. When Lisa's husband died for unexplained reasons, while being treated by Dr. Dixon, she blamed him and initiated a malpractice suit. John was found guilty until evidence surfaced that revealed that Lisa's husband had, in fact, been murdered. Angry that Lisa nearly destroyed his career; John pretended to forgive her and romanced her into a marriage proposal. John then humiliated Lisa by publicly dumping her. John later redeemed himself with Lisa by rescuing her from Martin Chedwyn. Since John's daughter Margo was married to Lisa's son Tom, the turmoil between John and Lisa caused ramifications that echoed throughout the entire family for some time.

=== Relationship with Barbara ===
During the dangerous and exciting time that John and Barbara worked together to rescue Lisa, they became very close, leading to an unexpected night of passion which resulted in Barbara's pregnancy. After proving to Barbara that he was serious in his commitment to her and their child, they married. Unfortunately, Barbara was injured in a bombing and John authorized the early birth of their son in order to save her life. Too premature to survive, the child, Johnny, died one week after being born. Barbara could not forgive John for the death of their son and initiated divorce proceedings.

To keep Barbara away from her ex-husband, Hal, John conspired with Carly Munson. Together they tried to keep Hal and Barbara apart by artificially inseminating Carly and claiming that Hal was the father. Eventually though the truth came out that John had provided the sperm. When Hal divorced Carly, John married her to help her inherit fifty million dollars. They divorced soon after their baby, Parker, was born. For once, John was content. He had a good job and for the first time in his life, he was raising a child. Sadly, John's world was crushed when he learned that Parker was not his son, but Hal's. Though John tried to deny it, he was forced to face up to the fact that Parker wasn't his and handed the boy over to Hal. Losing Parker brought back memories of losing Johnny and it was hard for John to adjust.

=== Grandchildren ===
Soon after, John received a blessing when Andy told him that he had a daughter with Denise Maynard. Thrilled at having a grandchild, John was dismayed to learn that Andy was uncertain about whether to keep his parental rights. Though everyone (including Andy) told him to stay out of it, John decided to fight for Hope on Andy's behalf. John decided that Denise wasn't the appropriate person to raise his granddaughter and went to a lawyer to find out about his grandparental rights. John took it upon himself to make sure Hope was a part of his family, even if it meant going against his own son. Knowing of John's plans, Andy quickly married Denise so that John couldn't gain custody. However, what began as a marriage of convenience turned into an obsession with Andy going as far as to fake paralysis to keep Denise married to him. Realizing that he was partly to blame for Andy's obsessive attitude, John let Denise take Hope after she divorced Andy.

=== Clashes with Bob and departure ===
Over the next few years, John focused on his career at Memorial. Just as his style of medicine clashed with Bob's when John first arrived in town, John disapproved of how Bob's son, Christopher, dealt with his patients—thinking that Chris went way beyond the call of duty. Although Chris fully expected to be dismissed from Memorial, John surprised him by offering him a position. In addition, John was sympathetic towards attorney Marshall Travers when he was falsely accused of rape and allowed him access to the medical records of a young girl named Sarah Smith since Marshall suspected the girl was his long-lost daughter. Later, John initiated a quiet investigation into Ben Harris's condition when he suspected that Ben shouldn't have been performing surgery. Afterwards, John left town with no fan fare to take an offer at Johns Hopkins University.

=== Return in 2010 ===
John returned to Oakdale at the request of Dr. Reid Oliver. Though not a cardiologist, Dr. Oliver was treating a mysterious patient whose heart was failing due to an exotic disease. Reid’s patient was none other than Chris Hughes who was adamant that his condition be kept secret. Ultimately, John convinced Chris to tell his family. Afterwards, John discovered that Chris’s heart was failing fast and he needed a transplant. Soon after, Dr. Oliver was involved in a fatal car crash. Before dying, the doctor requested that his heart be given to Chris.

In the meantime, John reconnected with both Lucinda and Dusty. Upon learning that Dusty had some doubts as to the paternity of Janet Ciccone’s newborn child, John secretly ordered a DNA test and was thrilled to discover that Dusty was indeed the baby’s father. At the same time, Lucinda had no luck repairing her newest rift with Lily and agreed to John’s invitation to accompany him to Amsterdam. A month later, they returned to Oakdale in love and John accepted an offer as interim Chief of Staff when Bob retired from Memorial.

== Character References Links ==
- Dr. John Dixon profile - Sonypictures.com
- John Dixon profile - Soapcentral.com
