= History of As the World Turns =

History of the American soap opera

As the World Turns is a long-running soap opera television series that aired on CBS from April 2, 1956, to September 17, 2010. Its fictional world has a long and involved history.

== 1956–1960 ==
=== Original cast ===
List of characters who were part of the original cast:

- Christopher Hughes - Don MacLaughlin (1956–86)
- Nancy Hughes - Helen Wagner (1956-2010)
- Donald Hughes - Hal Studer (1956–72, 1976–81, 1985, 1986, 1993, 1995)
- Penny Hughes - Rosemary Prinz (1956–68, 1971, 1985, 1986–87, 1998, 2000)
- Bob Hughes - Bobby Alford (1956-2010)
- Grandpa William Hughes - William Lee (1956–76)
- Edith Hughes - Ruth Warrick (1956–60)
- John Hughes - Larry Hugo (1956–57)
- Janice Turner - Joyce Van Patten (1956–57, 1962)
- Mrs. Turner - Leona Powers (1956–62)
- Judge James Lowell - William Johnstone (1956–79)
- Jim Lowell - Les Damon (1956–57)
- Claire Lowell - Anne Burr McDermott (1956–71)
- Ellen Lowell - Wendy Drew (1956-95 1998)
- Dr. Doug Cassen - Nat Polen (1956–67)

=== Storylines ===
- Chris (Don MacLaughlin) and Nancy (Helen Wagner) debate as to whether his father (Will "Pa" Hughes, played after the first episode by Santos Ortega) will live with them.
- Nancy's struggle to get over the death of her eldest unseen daughter, Susan, leads Penny (Rosemary Prinz) to have feelings of inadequacy.
- Penny puts her Aunt Edith (Ruth Warrick) on a pedestal. She also has allusions of her best friend, Ellen Cole (Wendy Drew), having a romance with her older brother Don.
- Edith Hughes and a married man, Jim Lowell (Les Damon), have an affair.
- Nancy visits her unseen sister Pearl, who lives away from Oakdale.
- Claire English Lowell tries to keep husband Jim at her side by overdosing. Dr. Doug Cassen (Nat Polen) helps her.
- Jim dies in a boating accident in Florida.
- John Hughes (Lawrence Hugo), Chris's brother, marries a woman named Marion.
- Don and Nancy fall out over Janice because Nancy thinks Janice Turner isn't good enough for Donald.
- Donald becomes engaged to Janice Turner. She breaks it off and marries Carl Whipple (Rod Colbin).
- Penny is in love with Jeff Baker (Mark Rydell) and elopes with him but it is annulled at Nancy's insistence.
- Al James (Donald Madden) and Jeff get in a fight over Penny, and Jeff is arrested after James dies.
- Penny becomes engaged to Tom Pope, but when she says she still loves Jeff, Tom breaks it off.
- Donald works for Mitchell Dru (Geoffrey Lum) on this show as well as two other serials, The Brighter Day and Another World). Donald leaves and works for the DA and then at the Lowell firm.
- Claire Lowell marries Dr. Doug Cassen.
- Ellen and Dr. Tim Cole (William Redfield), a married man, fall in love and have a child, James "Jimmy" Cole, but she gives him up for adoption. Louise Cole, Tim's wife (Mary K. Wells), arrives in Oakdale and names Ellen in their divorce proceedings.
- Edith marries Dr. George Frey (played by George O. Petrie and they leave town.
- Penny and Jeff get married. A live wedding and reception were broadcast, with on-air invitations at the end of the program for several days prior.
- When Jeff leaves town), Penny becomes pregnant but loses the baby.
- Lisa Miller (Eileen Fulton) comes to town with medical student Bob Hughes. Later, they secretly marry and her parents visit Oakdale from Rockport, Henry and Alma Miller (Luis van Ruten and Ethel Remey) attend the wedding. Lisa begins a relationship with Bob and they are secretly married.
- Lisa becomes pregnant.
- Nancy wants Bob and Lisa's marriage annulled but is forced to accept her into the Hughes home when Nancy discovers Lisa is pregnant.
- Jeff returns to Oakdale and is revealed to have an alcohol problem. He is treated at the hospital, where Penny approves of Dr. Cassen's treatment and his mother Grace does not.
- Tim has leukemia. Ellen marries him and weeks later he dies.
- The Stewart family comes to Oakdale. They are Dr. David Stewart (originally played by Ernest Graves and played for twenty years by Henderson Forsythe), his wife Betty Jackson Stewart (Patricia Benoit) and their two sons, Paul and Danny.

== 1961–1965 ==
- While babysitting for the Stewarts, Ellen Lowell realized that Danny Stewart is really her son Jimmy.
- Jeff Baker became a piano player in a bar under the name Jack Bailey. Meg Blaine (Teri Keane) developed feelings for him, then discovered his true identity.
- Penny Baker and Greg Williams (Robert Readick) made plans for a date. Meg Blaine, who had gone to Oakdale to tell Penny where Jeff was, overheard.
- Jeff begged Penny to take him back.
- Janice Whipple returned to town with daughters Alice and Debbie after Carl Whipple died. Donald Hughes then married Janice.
- Nancy tried to stop Don from getting back with Janice.
- Chris asked Nancy to stop interfering in Don's life.
- Lisa Hughes gave birth to Thomas Christopher Hughes.
- Lisa made excuses so she wouldn't have to do housework. She also falsely claimed that Pa Hughes disliked her.
- Claire became attracted to Bill Abbott. The two were kissing in a parked car when they were sideswiped by another car. Doug Cassen got angry and Bill left town.
- Ellen Cole became engaged to Jim Norman (James Broderick), but when he found out she was marrying him just to get custody of her son he left her.
- Lisa Hughes had an affair with her friend Linda Elliot's brother Bruce (James Pritchett). Bruce, a shoe tycoon, broke off the affair because Lisa wasn't sophisticated enough for him.
- Penny sees flowers from Bruce Elliott being delivered to Lisa. Lisa asks her to not tell Bob, but Penny, filled with hatred of Lisa and dedication to her younger brother, decides that she will tell him.
- Jeff and Penny were involved in a car crash. Jeff was killed and Penny was in a coma and woke up with amnesia (in what has been called "the automobile accident that shook the nation"). Every time that she sees Lisa, she thinks of flowers.
- Lisa Hughes became pregnant, but she miscarried and divorced Bob Hughes.
- Bob Hughes met and got closer to Sylvia Hill, R. N. (Millette Alexander).
- Nancy was disappointed that Bob wouldn't give his marriage with Lisa another try.
- Edna Rice's husband died because Doug Cassen didn't get a message on time due to his wife Claire's attempted overdose.
- Chris tried to get Nancy to apologize to Don.
- Interruptions in 1963 for the first bulletins on the assassination of John F. Kennedy.
- Don stood up in front of the whole of the Hughes family and accused Nancy of ostracizing his new family.
- Janice and Donald Hughes left town to go to Texas.
- Neil Wade (Michael Lipton) came to town and met Penny Hughes. Neil was a doctor who couldn't save his dying father.
- Neil saved Pa Hughes's life after he chokes at the Hughes's 4th of July party.
- Doug Cassen was revealed to be Neil Wade's father. His mother was Judith Wade. Judith had married Frank Wade because she was pregnant.
- Doug offered Neil a job at Oakdale Memorial instead of Bob.
- Lisa Hughes ran off with Tommy Hughes and put him in military school, but Chris and Bob Hughes brought Tom back.
- Franny Brennan (Toni Darnay), David's new housekeeper, harbored delusions that they would marry.
- Penny Hughes Baker and Dr. Neil Wade got married. Neil opens the Wade Book Store.
- Judith Wade and Jerry Stevens (Roy Poole) got married and left town.
- Judge Lowell almost died while under Neil's care, and Claire Cassen told Doug Cassen to stay away from Neil.
- Neil Wade gave up medicine and opened up a bookstore, the Wade Book Shop.
- Judge James T. Lowell convinced Don to return to Oakdale after learning that Janice had died.
- Hurt that Don didn't tell them of Janice's death, Chris sent Don a letter about it, but Don tore it up.
- Nancy encouraged Don to get to know Sara Fuller better.
- Donald Hughes rekindled his relationship with old flame, Ellen Cole.
- Danny Stewart called Ellen Cole "mother" while delirious with a fever.
- Lisa Hughes went to look for Tommy and got kidnapped. She was raped on a train car from Texas to California. (Pamela King was playing Lisa during this time.)
- Bob Hughes and Sylvia Hill became engaged. She broke it off and later married Dr. Al Suker.
- The Holmes Family (Bill, Ann, and their daughter, Amanda) came to Oakdale.
- Amanda Holmes's mother was really Sara Fuller (Gloria DeHaven).
- Ellen Cole and Donald Hughes got engaged, but then Dr. David Stewart proposed to Ellen.
- Dan Stewart almost died from encephalitis. He recovered, and left town to attend medical school.
- Lisa Hughes (now played again by Eileen Fulton) moved to Chicago but did not reveal where she was to anyone in Oakdale. There, she met the Eldridge family and married John Eldridge (Nicolas Coster) on the primetime serial Our Private World. They returned to Oakdale later that year and divorced.
- Lisa Hughes was going to sue for custody of Tom and tell Bob Hughes that she had married John Eldridge. When Tom didn't want to go with her, Lisa Hughes came to the Hughes's door step demanding Tom, but Penny kicked her out.

== 1966–1970 ==
- Ellen Cole fires Franny Brennan. When Franny threatens to tell Dan that Ellen is his mother, Ellen hits her over the head, killing her.
- In prison, Ellen Cole meets Sandy McGuire (Dagne Crane). Her husband, Roy McGuire (Kasey Arnold), was a convict who was responsible for her imprisonment.
- In prison, Sandy McGuire gives birth to a boy and names him Jimmy at Ellen's behest.
- Bill Holmes (William Prince tells his daughter, Amanda (played by Deborah Solomon Steinberg), that her real mother is Sara Fuller (played by Gloria DeHaven. Sara and Nancy Hughes become fast friends., and Chris warns Nancy that Claire's feelings may be hurt.
- Donald Hughes and Sara Fuller get engaged.
- Pa Hughes is unhappy when Nancy offers to work in Sara Fuller's shop
- Michael Shea comes to town and becomes Doug Cassen's protégé.
- Joan Rogers has a tumor and Dr. Doug Cassen tries to treat her, but she dies. Her husband, Ted Rogers, pushes Dr. Cassen who dies after hitting his head.
- Dr. Neil Wade, while out of town, dies of an embolism.
- Ellen Cole is released from prison. She and Dr. David Stewart are married.
- Amanda (Deborah Steinberg), in love with Don, threatens to show him a letter revealing that Sara Fuller is her real mother. While chasing Amanda to get the letter form her, Sara falls down a flight of stairs and dies. Amada is placed on trial for the death of Sara.
- Chris Hughes believes that Sara's death was an accident; however, Nancy and Don believe was murdered by Amanda Homes, the child Sara gave up for adoption.
- Nancy stands as a witness for the prosecution against Amanda. Chris is Amanda's defense lawyer and grills Nancy.
- Nancy forces Chris to sleep on the couch, but Chris later proves that Sara's death was accidental.
- Amanda Holmes dates Donald Hughes for a while and later leaves town. She later returns to Oakdale briefly to work at Wade's Book Store.
- An older Tom Hughes returned from serving in the Vietnam War with a drug habit. He attempted to break into the office of Dr. Michael Shea (originated by John Lasell but mainly played by Roy Shumann) to steal drugs.
- Lisa Hughes Eldridge had a fling with Claire Cassen Shea's husband, Dr. Michael Shea. When she becomes pregnant, she tried to get him to marry her, but he refused. She told Claire of their affair, and Claire divorced Michael. Michael blackmailed Lisa (who now hated him) into marrying him.
- Ellen and Dr. David Stewart are expecting a child.
- Sandy McGuire and Dr. Bob Hughes begin a relationship.
- Nancy makes it clear that she thinks that Bob should remarry Lisa instead.
- While in Vermont, Sandy is in a fire and is severely burned. Bob Hughes places her in a sanitarium.
- Penny Wade and Roy McGuire get married, but when Jimmy is returned to his mother, Sandy Hughes, they get an annulment and Penny leaves Oakdale.
- Ellen Stewart gives birth to Carol Ann Stewart.
- Dr. Dan Stewart comes back from medical school along with Dr. Susan Burke, whose father (played by James Karen) is an officer at Community Hospital. They had been secretly married and were going to have a baby, but Susan causes her own miscarriage. The strong-willed Susan wants her husband to practice medicine at Community Hospital rather than Memorial Hospital.
- Lisa Hughes gets pregnant with Michael Shea's child and when she gives birth she names the baby Charles "Chuckie" Shea.
- Claire stabs Michael with a letter opener when she hears the only reason he'll remarry her.
- Paul Stewart (played by a variety of actors) returns to town and falls for Elizabeth Talbot (played by Jane House).
- Dr. Michael Shea cruelly tells Dr. Dan Stewart the truth about his parentage.
- Ellen and David Stewart have a second child, Dawn "Dee" Stewart.
- Sandy McGuire Hughes divorces Dr. Bob Hughes.
- Sandy Hughes launches a modeling career with the help of Peter Kane (played by Arlen Dean Snyder).
- A new doctor at Oakdale Memorial Hospital, John Dixon (and later Michael Shea's protégé) comes in to treat Sandy McGuire's mother, Martha Wilson (played by Anna Mannot Warren), for a heart condition.
- An older Tom Hughes returned from serving in the Vietnam War with a drug habit. He attempted to break into the office of Dr. Michael Shea (originated by John Lasell but mainly played by Roy Shumann) to steal drugs.
- Tom Hughes leaves town for a while and finds Michael Shea writing a confession used to blackmail Lisa Hughes into marrying him.
- Dr. Michael Shea takes up with a new nurse, Karen Adams, R. N. (played by future author Doe Lang).
- Lisa and Michael get married.
- Chris Hughes helps Lisa by representing Michael Shea in court on a drunk driving claim; Chris gets Shea off with 6 months.
- When Chris discovers that his grandson Tom's grades are slipping in his school, he tries to persuade Tom not to join the army but he does anyway. Tom is sent to fight in Vietnam, but is sent back home. He returns with a drug habit.
- Michael Shea was planning to claim Lisa Shea was an unfit for a mother to Chuckie and he was going to blackmail her, but before he could he was shot and killed. Tom Hughes is put on trial for the crime and convicted, but it was actually Miss Thompson who killed Michael, because Michael caused her daughter to commit suicide.
- Amanda Holmes returns to town and purchases at the Wade Book Store after Penny's departure.
- Dr. Dan Stewart, in love with Elizabeth, wants a divorce from Dr. Susan Stewart, but she refuses to give him one.
- Dr. Susan Stewart becomes pregnant, but when she and Dan Stewart have a fight, she falls and loses the baby.
- Dr. Paul Stewart marries Elizabeth Talbot because she is pregnant by another man. Elizabeth gives birth to a baby girl, Elizabeth "Betsy" Stewart. Paul is unaware that his brother Dr. Dan Stewart is the father.
- Dr. Paul Stewart brings Elizabeth Talbot Stewart's brother, Ronnie Talbot, to Oakdale.
- Dr. John Dixon proposes to Sandy McGuire Hughes but she wants to marry Peter Kane instead.
- A mysterious woman, Meredith Harcourt, comes to Oakdale.

== 1971–1975 ==
- Claire Cassen is killed after running into a road to try to apologize to Dan Stewart; unaware of passing cars, Claire is struck by one and dies after apologizing to Dan (1971).
- Sandy McGuire married Peter Kane.
- Susan Stewart dated Dr. John Dixon briefly.
- Elizabeth Talbot Stewart becomes pregnant by Dr. Paul Stewart. She has a miscarriage and goes into a sanitarium.
- Susan then becomes pregnant by Dan Stewart.
- Penny Wade returns to town briefly with her adopted daughter Amy Hughes (who is looking for her true grandparents) but then leaves town and marries Anton Cunningham.
- Tom falls for Meredith Harcourt and allows her to stay in his home.
- Nancy doesn't trust Meredith and doesn't believe she is poor as she claims.
- Meredith buys Nancy some "costume jewelry" which Nancy has checked and discovers its value is $2000.
- Simon Gilbey comes to town and it is revealed that Meredith Harcourt is his ward.
- a wealthy new client, Simon Gilbey, seeks Chris Hughes's legal expertise.
- Gilbey overworks and insults Chris Hughes, his lawyer.
- Nancy is distraught when an overworked Chris suffers a heart attack.
- Don blames Bob and David for being too cautious regarding Chris's heart attack and wants Chris to have experimental surgery.
- Chris agrees with Bob against the idea of experimental surgery and, in time, makes a full recovery
- Simon Gilbey falls in love with Lisa Shea. Then Simon Gilbey and Meredith Harcourt leave town as lovers.
- Dr.Chuck Ryan Bob’s old medical school friend, comes back to Oakdale with his wife nurse Jennifer Sullivan Ryan (played by Jennifer Court -1971 and Gillian Spencer-1972-1975). He has had two children with Jennifer, Barbara (Judi Rolin, Barbara Stanger, Donna Wandrey-early 1970’s) and Rick Ryan (Con Roche-1972-73). Shortly after his return, Chuck dies.
- Dr. Paul(Marco St. John 1969-1970 then Dean Santoro-1970-72) and Elizabeth Stewart (Jane House-1969-72, Judith McGilligan-1972-1973) divorce and he later dies from a brain tumor.
- Nancy plays matchmaker and tries to set up Don with widowed Jennifer Ryan. However Bob falls for Jennifer and they begin a relationship.
- Nancy tries to get Bob and Lisa back together.
- Donald Hughes and Lisa Shea get together.
- Bob is hated by Jennifer's son, Dr. Rick Ryan, and Nancy warns Bob of the problems of living with the Ryan family.
- Lisa Shea believes she is pregnant by Don as he is the only one she has been having sex with. Eventually, she discover it is actually an ovarian cyst. Her doctor is played by future writer Douglas Marland.
- Don proposes to Lisa.
- Jennifer Ryan and Bob Hughes plan to get married.
- Tom Hughes and Carol Deming get married as do Bob and Jennifer.
- .
- Doctors Susan and Dan Stewart were very unhappy. Susan was much more interested in her career than her marriage. After Susan suffered a miscarriage, Dan grew closer to Liz Talbot, first as friends. Susan tried everything to stop this growing attraction, even matchmaking Liz with Paul Stewart. Liz and Paul marry.Susan suspects Liz is carrying Dan’s child. Dan eventually grows tired of Susan’s harshness and ambition and asks for a divorce. Susan flatly refuses and seduces Dan, becoming pregnant with Emily. After the birth, Susan finally grows tired of Dan and leaves him for Dr. Bruce Baxter. They divorce and she married Bruce Baxter, but he didn't like children, and Susan lets Dan raise Emily.
- Dan starts dating nanny/ nurse, Peggy Reagan (played by Susan Cameron), who had liked Dan Stewart for awhile.

*Bruce also had a vasectomy. Eventually, Susan regretted  giving up Emily (and Dan) and divorced Banner, who left town.

- When Dan Stewart performed gall bladder surgery on Marie Marino, she died and Joe Fernande shot him.
- Divorced Dan Stewart marries widowed Elizabeth Stewart, but after she accidentally left the safety gate for Betsy open at the top of the stairs while she and Susan Baxter were arguing, Elizabeth Stewart fell going up the stairs to check on Betsy. Elizabeth ruptured her liver and died, but not before telling Dan Stewart that he was Betsy Stewart's father.
- Rev. Wally Matthews (played by Charles Siebert, comes to town followed later by Peter Burton and his adopted mother, Grace Burton. Peter Burton realizes Wally Matthews is his father. Don Hughes is suspicious of the other man Lisa has been dating, Wally Matthews, and wants her decision about who she wants to be with. Finally, Don can't wait any longer and leaves Oakdale.
- Wally Matthews tells Peter Burton that he's his father and Peter Burton left town with his new wife Marion.
- Wally Matthews left town when Lisa Shea rejected him.
- Amy Cunningham, Penny Hughes's adopted daughter finds her real grandparents (played by William Prince and Augusta Dabney).
- Bob Hughes puts Rick Ryan on probation at the hospital.
- John Dixon wants to marry Kim Sullivan Reynolds.
- Bob Hughes, now separated from Jennifer goes to a medical convention in Florida. He runs into his sister-in-law, Kim Sullivan Reynolds who is singing in Florida. Bob has no idea Kim secretly came to Florida to be with him. They give into their attraction and have sex. Bob is shocked when he returns home and Jennifer tells him she wants to reconcile because she is pregnant.
- Kim Sullivan Reynolds is heartbroken to discover that Bob and Jen had reconciled and that she was also pregnant with Bob’s child. Kim chooses not to reveal who the father was. Jennifer gives birth to Frannie and Kim has a stillborn child. Years later, Douglas Marland, the Headwriter, retconned that and created Bob and Kim’s long lost daughter, Sabrina, who was exchanged at birth for another couple’s stillborn child.
- When Jennifer Hughes is about to get hit by a car Bob Hughes pushes her out of the way and gets hit instead. In the hospital, he reveals that he is the father of Kim Sullivan's child.
- John Dixon wants to marry Kim Sullivan Reynolds.
- Grant Colman (played by Kasey Arnold and, later, by James Douglass) comes to town (1973); he works for the Lowell firm and dates Lisa.
- Jay Stallings comes to town. Gil Stallings, his stepfather, burned their house down and came to town and set fire to the Wade Bookstore. Grant cornered him and he got hit by a truck. Jay Stallings starts up a construction company.
- Carol Hughes realizes she can't have children.
- Jennifer Hughes gives birth to Francis "Frannie" Hughes. (It is later revealed that twins had been born.)
- Nancy tries to reconcile with Jennifer who is hostile towards her mother-in-law.
- Natalie Bannon comes to town and Tom Hughes falls in love with her.
- Kim Dixon wants a divorce from John Dixon but he threatens her.
- Susan gets a new boyfriend, Mark Galloway (played by Anthony Herrera).
- Dr. John Dixon rapes Kim Dixon.
- Jennifer Hughes almost died of a disease, but recovered. Shortly after, she was involved in a car crash and died. Her son, Dr. Rick Ryan left town.
- John and Kim Dixon fight and he falls down the stairs, becomes paralyzed, and has to be in a wheelchair.
- Susan sued Dan Stewart for custody of Emily Stewart but loses. She sinks deep into alcoholism.
- Susan liked Jay Stallings but he was in love with Carol Deming. Jay and Carol later got married, but he and Susan Stewart had an affair.
- Emily Stewart almost died of meningitis.
- Pa Hughes finds love again with the unseen widow Erma Kopeckney and they marry.
- Kim and Dan Stewart also got a divorce but when a tornado hit she got a concussion so they continued their relationship.
- Kim Stewart and Grant Colman had a romance.

== 1980–1989 ==
Like many daytime dramas of the period, the show entered into a mixed experiment with heavily youth-oriented action-adventure storylines in the early 1980s under producer Mary-Ellis Bunim and writers Bridget and Jerome Dobson. One of their juiciest stories centered around the various and sundry traumas endured by Jennifer's daughter Barbara Ryan (Colleen Zenk Pinter) - during the years of her marriage to the charismatic criminal James Stenbeck (Anthony Herrera) (This was after she had left Tom Hughes at the altar in June 1980). James would be involved with smuggling both illegal drugs and stolen art work through Barbara and her partner Lisa's dress shop to show off Barbara's fashion designs, Fashions, Ltd.. James had various affairs while married to Barbara, and tried to drug her and kill her on more than one occasion so he could get sole custody of their young son, Paul (played as a child by Danny Pintauro). Then Barbara had a star-crossed romance with Gunnar Stenbeck (Hugo Napier), whom she first met through visions of a past life. Gunnar was revealed to be the true Stenbeck heir with James the son of the nanny. After marrying Barbara, Gunnar learned he had a terminal illness and, wanting to explore the world with the time he had left, bid adieu to Oakdale via hot air balloon.

The Dobsons centered the melodrama around a limited set of characters. One of their favorites was John Dixon, who regained his malicious streak after a few years of dormancy. But John's newly refound maliciousness started out somewhat innocently and at first was seen as being part of another new character's maliciousness. In the winter of 1980, coal mining company owner, Brad Hollister (Peter Brouwer) arrived in Oakdale and conned the Hugheses (Chris and Nancy), the Stewarts (Ellen and David), and Lisa Colman out of land to start mining (with both of the families and Lisa unaware of how profitable their land was). Despite Brad's con game, Dee Stewart (played in the 1980s by Jacqueline Schultz and Vicky Dawson) fell in love with him, but was hesitant to have sex after a bad experience with another man. A frustrated Brad turned to her sister, Annie (played in the 1980s by Julie Ridley, Randall Edwards and Mary Lynn Blanks), and Dee married a supportive John (who had kept Dee's secret about the true nature of the death of Ian McFarland) which was seen as a scandal by the pure-hearted Stewart family. Brad also had to contend with some concerns of safety at the mine, and also Melinda Gray coming on to him. Melinda would die in a freak drowning accident after the Hollister's mine July 4, 1980 picnic. Betsy Stewart overheard Brad and Melinda arguing before the drowning, but for a couple of months blocked the incident out. When Betsy recovered the memory, the D.A.'s office was sure Brad had murdered Melinda, but it was later ruled an accident. Dee got a job at the mine (Brad's version of paying back the Stewarts), and a couple of times John came by and started arguing with Dee, convinced she was having an affair with Brad. And then in October 1980 there was a cave-in at the mine, and one of those killed was mine worker Jay Stallings!

One night, mistakenly believing John was Brad, Dee allowed John to have sex with her. When she realized what had just happened, a horrified Dee believed John had sexually assaulted her and took him to trial for rape—a knockoff of the Dobson's highly successful marital rape storyline on Guiding Light in 1980. Dee hired recently arrived back in town, Tom Hughes (played at this time by Justin Deas) and John hired recently arrived in town attorney Maggie Crawford (Mary Linda Rapelye) (seen as a scandal, by many, in and of itself that a woman would defend a man in a rape trial). Tom and Maggie had been lovers and continued after Maggie moved to Oakdale. Maggie would get John acquitted when Dee had to admit on the witness stand both her past with the death of Ian, and also her love for Brad. Brad and Annie divorced shortly after this revelation by Dee. Shortly after his acquittal, David tried to run down John with his car but didn't succeed, and then David left Oakdale and suffered from temporary amnesia and adopted the name Donald Saunders. During this time, in the summer and fall of 1981, David as Donald got involved with the widowed Cynthia Haynes (Linda Dano) and adopted as his own, Cynthia's unruly and conniving teenage daughter, Karen Haines (Kathy "Kate" McNeil). David might have married Cynthia if it had not been for John tracking him down and bringing Dee to the wedding! John also faked his own death, battled blindness, feuded with James Stenbeck, married Stenbeck's conniving sister Ariel Aldrin (Judith Blazer), and later Karen Haines (who first would find out the truth about James not being the true Stenbeck heir and blackmail him into a loveless marriage, with James telling the reverend at the wedding ceremony, "No, I do not want to kiss the bride.") John also would learn along the way that he had a daughter he never knew (Margo) via a long-ago affair with nurse Lyla Montgomery (Veleka Gray, then for a decade, Anne Sward), who was Maggie Crawford's sister. Margo began an affair with James Stenbeck which broke up his marriage to Barbara. Dee left town, in 1983. James supposedly accidentally plunged to his death when he tried to kill John, Karen, Ariel, Dusty Donovan (Brian Bloom) (who was revealed to be the true Stenbeck heir; and Gunnar's biological son) and Gunnar on a small cargo airplane leaving the Caribbean while he and Gunnar were struggling, in February 1984 (but James was wearing a parachute). Annie, after having quadruplets with Dr. Jeff Ward (and after Jeff suffered briefly from drug addiction, when he nearly killed a patient, with John faking death stepping in to save Jeff's hide), did the same in 1984 (Dee, Annie and Jeff did return for a couple of episodes in 1985 and 1986. Cynthia Haines was last seen and leaving in 1982 and Karen Haines was last seen before departing the show after she got a divorce from John left in the spring of 1984.

The Dobsons's most lasting legacy was pairing Lisa and Bob's strait-laced son Tom with the sluttish Margo. Justin Deas and Margaret Colin thrilled viewers with their witty banter and subtle eroticism (Colin and Deas apparently enjoyed their work—they married in the early 1980s and remain married to this day). Bob Hughes surprised everyone by marrying an Italian woman, named Miranda Marlowe (Elaine Princi) who was working with James Stenbeck and a man only known as Mr. Big (actual name Bernard Ignatius Grayson; played by a dwarf named, Brent Collins) in smuggling drugs and stolen art work. Margo and Tom would be caught up in the intrigue involving James, Miranda and Mr. Big, and be kidnapped by Mr. Big (twice) and nearly lose their lives. Margo and Tom though would learn that Miranda had been separated from her teenage daughter, Bilan Marlowe (Kathleen Rowe Horton) who Mr. Big had kidnapped Bilan after murdering Miranda's former lover. Mr. Big would get eaten by a crocodile while trying to struggle with Tom and Margo to keep Bilan in his clutches in Africa. Miranda would leave Bob and follow a French man to Paris after Bob tried to get her to act like a "normal" housewife (something Miranda was not happy about). Maggie would lose Tom to Margo, but would later marry policeman Frank Andropoulos (Jacques Perrault), a member of a large Greek family transplanted to the U.S. Maggie and Frank would later adopt a baby girl Maggie named, Jill, but would have to fight Jill's biological father, Cal Randolph (Luke Reilly). Cal at first seemed to be a former alcoholic who seemed to be a drifter with no purpose, but it would later be revealed he was an F.B.I. Agent. When it was revealed that Cal was with the F.B.I., Maggie and Frank were certain they would lose custody of Jill. But Cal finally let it be known to the court that his profession was probably not the best job to be in raise Jill (especially since Jill's mother couldn't be located), and agreed to let Maggie and Frank raise Jill as their own, with Maggie and Frank agreeing to a generous visitation rights for Cal. Kim Stewart also married an Andropolous, Nikolas "Nick" (Frank's cousin; played by Michael Forest), a restaurant owner who took Kim on a beautiful honeymoon in Greece (with many location shots of several Greek ruins). Also introduced was Margo's younger sister, and Lyla's other daughter, Cricket Montgomery (Lisa Loring) who Lyla seemed to have even less control over than Margo. Cricket while still in high school got a job working as an assistant for a movie company and got pregnant, but tried to pass off the child as Brad Hollister's handsome younger brother, Eric (played by Peter Reckell). But after Eric's life was saved by Karen Haines when she discovered that some of the illegal drugs being smuggled through Fashions had nearly killed Eric, Eric developed feelings for Hayley Wilson (Dana Delany) who was a temporary ward of John Dixon's. Eric and Hayley would marry before the end of 1981 and leave town, but Eric would return for the birth of Cricket's child she named William "Billy". But Karen and Jeff Ward (the brother of the young movie maker that had actually gotten Cricket pregnant) knew that Eric wasn't the father, and blasted Cricket into telling the truth. Eric would then leave town and he and Hayley haven't been heard of since. Cricket would later get involved with computer geek, Ernie Ross (J. Marshall Watson) who was a virgin for a long time, nervous around the very beautiful Cricket. But after he got his nerve up, Ernie became a wild man in the bedroom, and on his "first time" with Cricket he got her pregnant. Ernie left town because he thought Cricket would never marry him. But he returned short time later and see that she was pregnant and would marry her. Ernie adopted Billy as his own child, and the couple left with their daughter, Suzie, and relocated to Oregon. Cricket would return for a short time in 1984, but except for Billy's return in 2001, Cricket, Ernie and Suzie would not be seen again.

The Dobsons departed after a few years but the show managed to remain a strong Emmy contender, while increasingly sagging ratings and introducing the world to actress Meg Ryan as well as Marisa Tomei. Tomei played ditzy teen Marcy Thompson, who briefly accused Bob Hughes of sexual harassment. Marcy would go on to marry a real prince, who turned out to be Paul Stewart's long lost son, Lord Stewart Cushing, and move to England and become Lady Cushing. Ryan was a more SORASed Betsy Stewart, who struggled through a marriage to Margo's bad-seed brother Craig Montgomery (played by heartthrob Scott Bryce, and years later by Hunt Block) while pining away for blue-collar Steve Andropolous (Frank Runyeon), Frank's cousin. Nick was opposed to his stepdaughter, Betsy, being in relationship with Steve and one day Nick died of a heart attack during an argument with Steve, leaving Kim a widow yet again. This also set up a year and a few months storyline where Betsy was forced into the marriage with Craig, and then Craig doing everything he could (illegally of course) to keep the Betsy and Steve apart (he even tampered with paternity tests to show that he was the father of Betsy's daughter, Danielle, and not Steve as was the truth). When Steve and Betsy married in May 1984, the show soared to #1 in the ratings for the week. Steve's friend and best man, trucker turned private investigator, Tucker Foster (Eddie Earl Hatch) was introduced, and he was the first major African-American character in As the World Turns's history. Tucker had a romance for a while with gospel singer, Heather Dalton (Tonya Pinkins) who sang at Steve and Betsy's wedding, but as Heather became more popular as a pop singer, Tucker and Heather's relationship suffered.

Some longtime fans were dispirited, however, by the show's dwindling emphasis on the core Hughes and Stewart families, and were angered when Bunim's relentless emphasis on youth storylines at the expense of established characters led longtime favorite Eileen Fulton - once the undisputed star of As the World Turns - to quit the role of Lisa in disgust. (Fulton returned several months later. Betsy Von Furstenberg played the role while Fulton was gone). Although introduced through Lisa was the McColl family. Before Fulton left in 1983 she married the wealthy businessman, Whitney McColl (Robert Horton), who had three children from his previous marriage to Joanna: Diana McColl (Kim Johnston Ulrich) (who would open a nightclub, and get involved with Craig Montgomery, Steve Andropoulos — by whom she got pregnant with, but would miscarry the child — and Cal Randolph), Brian McColl (played by Robert Burton, Frank Telfer and Mark Pinter), and Whit and Joanna's youngest son, Kirk McColl (Christian Jules LeBlanc). Kirk would get involved with both Frannie Hughes (before she went away to college) and Marcy Thompson (before she got married). But Kirk was a ruffian who was involved with several robberies and also became an alcoholic for a while, until his brother, attorney turned newspaper man, Brian helped get him into recovery. On August 2, 1984 after a benefit concert given by Jermaine Jackson, Whit would be found dead from a blow in the head by Lisa (a returned Fulton) in his study. A murder mystery was begun where there were many suspects, but in the end the real culprit would turn out to be the McCall's long time housekeeper Dorothy Connors (Nancy Pinkerton Peabody), who had a teenage boy named Jay Connors (Breck Jamison) a couple of months older than Kirk and would compete with Kirk for the affections of Frannie. As it would turn out, Dorothy had accidentally killed Whit by striking him in the head with a crystal decanter while they were having an argument about the upbringing of their illegitimate child, Kirk McColl.

From 1985 to 1993, the show was written by Douglas Marland, whose tenure is widely considered to be the second golden age of As the World Turns. After what had been several years of standoffs between Bunim's production office and the cast over long-term story direction, the program was finally returned to its roots under Marland and executive producers Robert Calhoun and later Laurence Caso. Marland wrote the matriarch and patriarch of the Hughes family back into the storyline, bringing back original cast members Helen Wagner and Don MacLaughlin, who had left after a spat with Bunim. Marland's back-to-emotional basics writing — characterized by psychological authenticity and a deep understanding of family dynamics — coupled with the successful integration of a new farm family, the Snyders (based on Marland's own large and close-knit family), brought enormous approval from fans and critics alike, and caused the show's ratings to approach the level they had once reached in the 1970s. Marland's storytelling placed the highest value on character development and realism, and he consistently drew fresh material from the show's rich history. Long-unseen characters like Penny Hughes (with Rosemary Prinz returning to the role after a seventeen-year absence) and Susan Stewart (Marie Masters, returning for the first time since 1979) were seen once again, and new storylines rippled from events far in the show's past. Daytime viewers heartily approved of Marland's mining of new twists from storylines and characters they remembered from as far back as the 1960s and 1970s. One history-rich storyline shone a spotlight on Kim, who began receiving notes and flowers from a secret admirer. The attention became more and more threatening as Kim tried to decipher who the mystery person was. Meanwhile, Bob's daughter Frannie, played by this time by future movie star Julianne Moore, fell in love with mysterious restaurant owner and widower Douglas Cummings (John Wesley Shipp) and nearly married him. Cummings was revealed to be Kim's stalker and killed three characters who knew his secret, a young woman named Marie Kovac (Mady Kaplan), Cal Randolph and his psychiatrist Henry Strauss (who was run into in front of the Hughes home). Cummings also nearly choked to death Heather Dalton when she came upon his secret. Cummings then kidnapped both Frannie and Kim when they stumbled upon his secret shrine room to Kim. And then Cummings nearly killed Frannie, but Frannie's former boyfriend Kevin Gibson (played by later primetime star Steven Weber; Frannie and Kevin had broken up because Marie Kovac had falsely claimed she was pregnant by Kevin and had paid for an abortion for her) jumped in front of the bullet when the right-hand woman of Cumming's, Marsha Talbot (Giulia Pagano) -- who ended up stabbing Doug Cummings to death in her jealousy (Kim would go on trial for this murder, but it would be revealed at the trial that it was indeed Marsha, who went to prison, but escaped for a few days and held Frannie hostage in a cabin until two young men, Seth Snyder (the eldest child of the Snyder clan played by Steve Bassett) and Dr. Casey Peretti, played by Bill Shanks came to rescue her). Douglas Marland cited this as his favorite storyline. He then dipped into history yet again to have Kim and Bob track down the daughter they long believed was dead, Sabrina, played originally by Julianne Moore in a dual role and then solely by Claire Beckman from 1990 to 1991.

Marland breathed new life into ever-distraught heroine Barbara Ryan. She dated Brian McColl (played by Mark Pinter, her real-life husband; Marland would write out both Diana and Kirk within the first year of his writing the show in 1985) but when he dumped her for another woman, Shannon O'Hara (real name Erin Casey, played by Margaret Reed), Marland decided to have Barbara abandon her goody-two shoe ways and become a vixen. She tried to break up Tom and Margo but then became involved with, arguably, the love of her life: police detective Hal Munson (Benjamin Hendrickson). Barbara also broke up Brian and Shannon by bringing Shannon's long thought dead husband, the Scottish Duncan McKechnie (Michael Swan) to Oakdale. Duncan and Shannon became a super couple on their own, and Brian would end up marrying Duncan's grown daughter from a previous affair, Beatrice McKechnie (Ashley Crow).

Barbara would get the scare of her life when James Stenbeck returned from the "dead" hiding in Duncan's castle that Duncan had transferred from Scotland to Oakdale. James would reveal himself to Barbara by saying, "Hello, Barbara...!", to the delight of many audience members.

Much later, after a one-night stand with Darryl Crawford (Rex Smith), Barbara was forced to admit that the baby that was conceived (Jennifer, named after her mother) was not Hal's, and he divorced her. In the 1990s, however, Barbara and Hal were to be married two more times, though their happiness wasn't long-lived. For the better part of three decades, Barbara's turbulent personal life has seldom strayed from center stage.

In 1988 Marland introduced the first gay male character, Hank Elliot (Brian Starcher), to daytime. Hank was a masculine man who was introduced to the town before revealing his homosexuality. The characters, particularly young slightly SORASed teenagers Paul Ryan (played at this time by Andrew Kavovit) and his friend, Andy Dixon (played by Scott DeFreitas), then had to struggle with their feelings over being around him. Ultimately, when Hank was shot after saving Paul from his nefarious father James, Paul realized what a true friend Hank was. When Hank was written out of the show, Marland almost gave him AIDS, but felt that would send a stereotypical message. Instead he gave Hank's off-camera partner the virus.

During Marland's tenure, Lisa McColl was revitalized, when she befriended her stepson Brian's girlfriend (and later fiancé) Shannon O'hara. Shannon had a somewhat mysterious uncle Earl Mitchell (played by screen legend Farley Granger), who became taken by Lisa, who was still mourning the death of her husband Whit McColl. After spending a good deal of time together, Lisa and Earl were married in 1986. However, Lisa never knew what to make of Earl's mysterious practice of abruptly disappearing for several weeks at a time. When Earl disappeared for an extended period in 1988, Lisa's friends and family assumed he had left her, and she herself had begun to eventually accept this herself, but then she began receiving mysterious phone calls and messages. Aided by her former husband Grant Colman, it eventually came out that Earl had been an interpol agent, investigating James Stenbeck, and had been murdered by James during his investigation.

Marland had a rule never to introduce new characters until he had been at a series for six months and knew the canvas, but many of the new characters that Marland introduced often became every bit as beloved as the old favorites. Many of the stories during this period revolved around Lucinda Walsh (Elizabeth Hubbard; she had been created shortly before Marland arrived at ATWT), a tough-as-nails businesswoman whose tremendous confidence, savvy and success in the boardroom masked a deep pain and vulnerability over her failings as a mother and romantic partner. Her adopted daughter Lily (Martha Byrne) became, in many respects, the emotional centerpiece of the program, as she entered into a series of star-crossed love affairs that took much precedence in the late 1980s and early 1990s. Although Lily was raised rich, she'd had quite a tough childhood, having seen at a young age Martin Guest, the man she'd believed to be her father, commit suicide. One day, Lily was told that her close friend and by then brother-in-law Craig Montgomery's airplane had gone down. Thinking him dead, Lily ran to a barn at the Snyder Farm and wept. Farmhand Rod Landry (William Fichtner) found her here and shook her, asking what was wrong. At this moment, Lily's biological mother Iva Snyder (Lisa Brown) happened to enter the room. She thought that Rod (whose real identity was Josh Snyder) was trying to rape Lily as he'd raped her, so she grabbed a pitchfork and blurted out that Lily was Rod/Josh's daughter. Emotionally charged scenes like these were characteristic of Marland's tenure.

One of the more puzzling aspects of the Snyder family involved near-incestuous relationships, the most confusing of which involved Lily and Holden (Jon Hensley). Lily was dating safe, kindhearted Dusty Donovan (then played by Brian Bloom) in 1985 when brooding stable boy Holden Snyder taught her how to ride horses. Sensing a palpable chemistry between Byrne and Hensley, Marland paired them up. The problem was that if Iva was Holden's sister and Lily was Iva's daughter, then Holden was Lily's biological uncle. To straighten out the mess, Marland had Iva learn she had been adopted by Emma (Kathleen Widdoes) and Henry Snyder at a time when they believed they could not conceive children. Another, more controversial story aspect was Meg Snyder (then played by Jennifer Ashe) falling in love with Josh Snyder in spite of knowing he had raped her sister. Marland revealed Josh had been brutally beaten by his father for years, but some fans still never warmed to the Meg/Josh relationship. Another Snyder story involved real incest, when Angel Lange (Alice Haining) arrived in Oakdale. She had been Holden Snyder's brother Caleb Snyder's girlfriend while he lived in Chicago, and had an abortion. On the rebound and angry about Caleb's shoddy treatment of Angel, Holden married Angel and they moved to Europe. When they returned a year or so later, Angel refused to give him a divorce even though everyone knew he was in love with Lily. What seemed to be selfishness was actually abject terror of what her father Henry Lange (James Rebhorn) would do to her if she were alone. Sure enough, one night Henry crawled into Angel's bed and raped her, as he had been doing ever since she was a little girl. When Caleb learned the fetus Angel had aborted was her own father's, he confronted Henry, who then killed himself out of shame. Caleb stood trial due to his unwillingness to expose Angel's secrets to the world, but finally Angel took the witness stand and confessed her father's brutality. A few years later, Angel married the eldest Snyder brother, Seth (Steve Bassett) and they moved to New York City in 1993.

Marland often delved into realistic portrayals of controversial, socially relevant topics in his storylines. During his tenure, the citizens of Oakdale encountered AIDS, homosexuality, Native American land rights, incest, euthanasia, and menopause, in addition to the more typical soap opera tribulations. Marland always centered his stories around beloved characters and steered away from preaching. As a result, viewers accepted the heavy emphasis on social issues.

== 1990-1999 ==
The decade started out well, but then the show lost many popular characters. The death of Douglas Marland hit the show especially hard. It then brought on its own double whammy by introducing the Carly Tenney character and invoking many mind-boggling storylines.

== 2000–2007 ==
As the World Turns rang in the new millennium with a "Carly Tenney Originals" fashion show and then ended the Alec Wallace murder mystery. Young heroine Georgia (Jaime Nicole Dudney), Lucinda's niece, had been the culprit, as she had gone to visit Wallace to talk to him and accidentally shot him as she struggled to get a gun away from him (all the while, Margo lay passed out in his bed). Given the extenuating circumstances, she was cleared of charges and married her boyfriend Eddie (Nathaniel Marston) in a dual ceremony with Tom and Margo, who also renewed their vows after a year of separation. At their wedding reception, Margo pushed the face of resident bitch Emily Stewart (whose machinations had broken up Tom and Margo to begin with) into the wedding cake (which had been made by Tom's mother, Lisa). (The writers had reportedly planned to have Emily turn out to be Wallace's murderer, but were forced by producers to change things mid-storyline.) This emphasis on over-the-top humor highlighted the campy nature of soaps at the turn of the millennium. Since the debut of NBC's low-rated spoof-soap Passions (which targets teen and young-adult soap viewers as its audience), As the World Turns and other soaps began a move toward satire.

Much airtime was devoted to star-crossed lovers Christopher "Chris" Robert Hughes (played at this time by Paul Korver) and Abigail Williams (Kristina Sisco), to the chagrin of viewers, who found scenes where Chris read F. Scott Fitzgerald to the much younger Abigail to be overly sappy. The pair were destined for a break-up, however, because, before they met, Chris had a brief fling with Abigail's mother Molly Conlan. When Abigail discovered the affair, she was so distraught when confronting Molly that she chased her down a flight of stairs, resulting in Molly being in a coma for months. This was actually to cover actress Lesli Kay's real life pregnancy. At the same time Kay was pregnant, her co-stars Maura West and Ellen Dolan were as well. The show used this "pregnancy epidemic" as an excuse for what fans felt was a dip in quality.

With the new millennium, As the World Turns was still honoring its veteran actors, but as the decade progressed, that spotlight has inarguably dimmed. On June 2, 2000, the show did a special episode commemorating the 40 years of work by Don Hastings (Chris's father, Bob Hughes) and Eileen Fulton (Lisa Miller Hughes Eldridge Colman McColl Mitchell Grimaldi) on the show. In the episode, town-witch Emily Stewart published an article in her tabloid rag blasting the oft-married Lisa. A spontaneous party was thrown to support Lisa, and at the end of the episode, she and Bob shared a dance as they remembered old times.

With three leading ladies on maternity leave, the slack was picked up by Martha Byrne, who had played Lily Snyder on and off since 1985 and now tackled a dual role. While walking at the Snyder pond one day, Lily found some old love letters made out to "Beloved". Lily found a picture of "Beloved" and was startled to find she looked exactly like her. When Lily posted the picture of "Beloved" on the Internet, she found out that somebody in Atlantic City had exactly the same picture. Meanwhile, Lily was remodeling her home with the help of a mysterious Australian named Simon Frasier (Paul Leyden). Simon was after the "Rose of Sharon", a priceless diamond that his family member had given to Beloved. When Lily went to Atlantic City (where she met her doppelgänger, Rose D'Angelo), Simon followed. Lily found the diamond that she had read about in the letters Simon's grandfather had written to "Beloved", and accidentally came to possess it. Though fighting for her life while being chased by Simon and his insane sister Celia (Fiona Hutchison), Lily had become friends with Rose and didn't want to lose the priceless heirloom. The psychotic Celia didn't want Simon to find the diamond, so she proceeded to leave them on a deserted island, while Rose, convinced by a cryptic phone message that Lily was not coming home, settled into the rich Lily's life. Rose gradually fell in love with Holden and Lily (in a case of Stockholm syndrome) with Simon. Rose was discovered to have been Lily's identical twin, as their mother (Iva) had been drugged during the birth. The two initially hated each other, but gradually formed a bond at Lucinda's insistence.

Maura West returned to As the World Turns after a long maternity leave during the fall of 2000, in a storyline penned by new writer Hogan Sheffer. Sheffer had been brought in to clean up Leah Laiman's storylines (Lily and Simon's months spent on the deserted island, among other stagnant plots) that had been progressively upsetting the show's fans. When West's re-introduction (which also brought in Hunt Block as Craig Montgomery, a popular character from the 1980s and early 1990s) proved popular with fans, Sheffer was promoted to head writer.

=== The Sheffer years ===
As the new head writer of As the World Turns, Sheffer quickly became a critical darling, although by the end of his five-year run as head writer he would be a controversial figure among As the World Turns fans. By some, he was credited with reviving the strong sense of character development and emotional complexity long associated with the program. By others, (most vocally by five-decade veteran actress Eileen Fulton), he was accused of neglecting the show's veteran characters. A major complaint from the latter group was lack of payoff and complete ignorance of the show's history.

Although some of the As the World Turns audience became jaded with Sheffer during his tenure as head writer, he was initially almost universally beloved. ATWT's success at the 2001 Daytime Emmy Award Show, after having been neglected for the better part of the 1990s, was credited to Sheffer, who had never held a position in daytime soap writing before As the World Turns. Sheffer himself professed in one interview that he had never seen a soap opera before January 15, 2000; when Procter & Gamble asked him to tune in to watch As the World Turns and Guiding Light and decide which one he wanted to write for. Guiding Light, which revolved mostly around the government of fictitious tropical island San Cristobel and the Santos mafia family at the time, did not interest Sheffer very much. As the World Turns, however, intrigued Sheffer. He thought the storylines were "boring as hell" but liked the actors and characters. Brutal honesty in interviews became Sheffer's trademark. In the television industry, and soap operas especially, many interviews from network and sponsor executives came off as rehearsed. Sheffer was always blunt, admitting to his faults and mistakes and not being afraid to curse.

As pressure to court the audience of younger-skewing ABC Daytime increased, various former-ABC Daytime stars were hired by As the World Turns during the Sheffer Era. By 2004, it was felt by fans and executives that these stars were beginning to dominate the show and Sheffer started making efforts to include longtime actors such as Kathryn Hays, Don Hastings, and Helen Wagner back into the story (although two other long-time actors, Benjamin Hendrickson and Larry Bryggman, who had a combined 54 years on As the World Turns, left the show that year in contract disputes.) Under Sheffer, As the World Turns secured Daytime Emmy awards for Outstanding Drama Series in 2001 and 2003, and for Outstanding Drama Series Writing Team in 2001, 2002, and 2004. The Sheffer Era can probably be split into pre- and post-summer 2001, when Mary Alice Dwyer-Dobbin dictated changes in the writing staff. Hal Corley, Stephen Demorest, and Richard J. Allen were fired from the writing staff and replaced by female writers, in an attempt to "soften" the program. Sheffer was against this move, stating to the media that he was "surrounded by women" in the As the World Turns writing room.

Sheffer clearly loved adventure and mystery storylines, and under his tenure the program began to up its shock value quotient. The first of many mystery storylines under Sheffer culminated in early 2001, when, following a long search, popular couple Jake and Molly McKinnon located Jake's previously assumed-dead twin daughters, Bridget and Michelle. Their happiness, however, would not last. Molly's ex-boyfriend, Nick Scudder (Carl T. Evans), responsible for landing her in jail (where she met Lily in 1997), surfaced in Oakdale. He swore that he had reformed and took a job at Kim's television station, WOAK-9. Molly's daughter Abigail befriended him, but one night Nick tried to rape her. Then the next morning Nick was discovered dead. Abigail had no memories of the night and for months the wheels of a murder mystery turned until it was revealed that the nanny of Bridget and Michelle, Mary Mennihan (aka Mary Dolan) (Marian Tomas Griffin), had been responsible for killing Nick. Worried that Abigail was close to recalling the events of the night Nick was murdered, Mary decided to attack. When Abigail eluded her, Mary resorted to a plan B of taking Molly hostage and holding up the wealthy Jake for a sizeable ransom. Deciding to take matters into his own hands, Jake made a bold move to rescue Molly. The showdown culminated in Mary falling to her death from a rooftop high above Oakdale, but before that, she was successful in fatally shooting Jake. Jake's daughters were taken away from Molly (in guest appearances by Another World stars Anna Stuart and Ellen Wheeler, who was also a director of As the World Turns at the time) and although she was promised visits with them, this angle was never explored, as Molly quickly moved on into a romance with returned character Mike Kasnoff (now played by Mark Collier) in July 2002, only two months after Jake's death.

The most popular of Sheffer's many murder mysteries was a series of murders at the Oakdale Memorial Hospital in early 2003. Former Dynasty star John James joined the cast as Dr. Susan Stewart's (Marie Masters) new colleague and love interest, Dr. Rick Decker. Not long after, hospital patients began to randomly die. This storyline brought the hospital, neglected for several years, back to the forefront. SORASed younger characters Katie, Chris (at this time played by Bailey Chase), and Susan's younger daughter, Alison (at this time played by Jessica Dunphy) all took jobs there, putting them into contact with some of the older characters. Although the older characters were gradually phased out of the storyline, no major characters were killed, and the younger characters's jobs at the hospital didn't last very long, the effort was applauded by fans, and the suspense was enough to keep them coming back for more. James's performance was also lauded as Rick Decker gradually showcased his true colors as a psychotic killer.

During Sheffer's tenure, As the World Turns placed a renewed emphasis on romance. Although the show was accused during this period of having too many "insta-couples" (which in soap lingo means couples who are put together quickly, regardless of the chemistry between the actors), many popular couples developed during this period nonetheless. At the 2000 Halloween party (the theme was Roaring Twenties, ) Katie (Terri Colombino) and Simon (Paul Leyden), having been scorned by the objects of their affections (married duo Holden and Lily, respectively,) had a one night stand in the back of a car. Katie became enamored with former gigolo Simon, and began pursuing him. When the INS came after Simon (who was from Australia), Katie married him to keep him in the country. Fans rooted for Katie as she schemed to make Simon love her, and the duo renewed its vows in Fall 2001. Unfortunately, the show seemed unable to figure out where to go with the couple, giving them abbreviated or confusing stories such as Simon's evil doppelgänger Donovan menacing Katie, or Katie's career-making, "Butt Buster" aerobic videos, or when psychotic Dahlia Ventura (Colleen Dion) befriended Katie and inexplicably convinced her Simon killed one of his previous wives, her sister, Monique Farrar (actually, Dahlia killed her own sister). In 2003, Simon left town due to Bartleby Shears's threats on Katie's life. Bartleby (Jonno Roberts; Roberts would also play Bartleby's twin, Mordecai Shears) was a former con man with whom Simon worked back in Australia. Bartleby came to Oakdale looking for Simon to do one more con. Simon didn't want to do the con and he ended up killing Bartleby and leaving town. Before he left Simon took all the money out of their bank accounts. Katie went to work at Memorial as a nurse's aid. Katie was devastated and even as she attempted to move on with Mike (now played by Mark Collier) returned to convince her to move on with her life, but several months later, Katie inexplicably learned that Simon was behind the return of Mike's old girlfriend Pilar Domingo (played from 1996 to 1997 by Roselyn Sanchez and in 2004 by Daniella Alonzo). As the World Turns never gave any reasonable explanation for Simon's sudden turn to the dark side and the moment was panned by many fans and critics. Although Mike and Katie were a popular couple, they were broken up in favor of a romance between Mike and Jennifer Munson (played as an adult from July 1999 to March 2002 by Kim Onasch and from July 2003 until the character's on-screen death in July 2006 by Jennifer Ferrin), whose own romance with the theretofore unknown Stenbeck son, Jordan (Chris Beteem) was deep-sixed. The Mike/Jen romance paved the way for a romance between Katie and fan-favorite Henry Coleman (Trent Dawson). Henry, who had loved Katie from afar for years, suggested to her that they marry in an attempt to make Mike jealous and come back to her. Katie agreed; Henry, however, was sincere in his proposal and hoped against hope that Katie would fall just as much in love with him as he was with her. The two opened a gym together and, for a few months, managed to be happy, even consummating their relationship. By May 2005, Henry had realized once and for all that Katie could only love Mike, and despite Katie's pleas, ended their marriage.

Another popular couple created by Sheffer was Aaron Snyder (Agim Kaba) and Alison Stewart (Jessica Dunphy). Alison had a crush on Aaron immediately after he showed up in Oakdale in 2002, and pulled many schemes to try to steal him from Craig Montgomery's saccharine daughter Lucy (then played by Peyton List). Aaron stayed with Lucy (and in one lambasted storyline in Fall 2002, Aaron and Lucy (along with Alison) went on the run after Aaron was accused of arson, touring college campuses across the country and having college students urge Hal to "free the Oakdale Three") while Alison developed a relationship with Chris Hughes (Bailey Chase) (now a doctor, after only two years of pre-med and medical school!) However, Aaron and Alison remained close friends, and when Alison became pregnant it seemed like she and Chris would get married (she suffered a miscarriage soon after). Alison moved in with Chris's family and befriended his grandmother Nancy Hughes. In summer 2004, the Oakdale characters engaged in a quest to find the "Keys to the Kingdom", a scavenger hunt sponsored by Lucinda's newspaper with a cash reward. Aaron and Alison teamed up and quickly became best friends. Soon, however, they realized their feelings went beyond friendship, and when Chris left town after cheating on Alison with her sister Emily, Aaron and Alison declared their love for one another. Unfortunately, Aaron's entire right side became paralyzed in a boxing accident shortly after this. Alison's wanted to help him, but Aaron insisted that he do everything for himself. The young love story was seen as refreshing by many fans. In 2005, Agim Kaba chose to leave the show, and Aaron moved to Seattle to be with his terminally ill mother, Julie. Alison stayed behind for a few months, but in July 2005, she moved to Seattle to be with Aaron and said farewell to Oakdale and her family.

Lucy (then played by Peyton List), meanwhile, began dating the much older Dusty (who had been lovers with her Aunt Lily fifteen years earlier), a romance that was popular with a subset of viewers who dubbed them "Lusty". The romance ended rather abruptly, with Lucy leaving Oakdale for college in January 2005. This storyline was responsible for (in the eyes of many viewers) doing irreversible damage to Craig's character. Craig had often been scheming since returning to town in 2000, but he was so opposed to Dusty and Lucy's relationship that he paid a man to stalk her. The story included Craig causing the death of Sierra's fiancée, and Craig killing the paid stalker in cold blood. He paid for none of these crimes, and in spite of a brief kidnapping of Lucy and stay in a monastery (arranged by Sierra in an attempt to make him change his ways), he seemed to feel no remorse for what he had done.

Perhaps the signature couple of the 2000s was Carly Tenney and Jack Snyder. Sheffer professed little interest in the couple for a number of years, attempting to pair Carly up with Craig Montgomery, and saddling Jack with Julia (Annie Parisse), who had debuted as a heroine but under Sheffer's tenure spiralled into madness. Julia killed a horse and kidnapped Carly before being sent to the mental institution. The absolute nadir arrived during 2002, when Barbara Ryan had James Stenbeck kidnap Carly, Emily Stewart and Rose to get them out of the lives of the men she loved. Jack planned to go search for Carly but Julia broke out of the institution and held Jack prisoner. In the course of the storyline, Julia, desperate for a child, gave Jack Viagra so that he would be forced to have sex with her. Many fans expected a serious discussion of male rape, but instead the whole thing was played for laughs, and immediately forgotten. Carly then had a brief fling with old flame Mike and had to figure out if Jack or Mike was the father of her baby. Julia returned with a baby (J.J.) she claimed was Jack's, but paternity tests proved otherwise. In summer 2003, Jack and Carly remarried, only to have Jack presumed dead and suffering from amnesia. He recovered with the help of a nurse named Julia Larrabee and her son J.J. Julia tried to hang on to Jack post-amnesia and then seduced his cousin Holden. No explanation was ever given for the similarity in names. The nurse Julia was played by former ABC Daytime star Sarah Brown. In March 2005, Julia hit her head during a fight with Lily and died. Lily, scared that she would be blamed for the accidental death of Julia, fled the scene of her crime (her son Luke helping her conceal evidence of having been at the scene of the crime.) It was thought that Julia's brother Keith (played by another ABC Daytime star, Kin Shriner) killed Julia, but when suspicion shifted to Luke, Lily took the blame for Julia's death. Lily became involved with Keith even though she suspected he killed Julia. The killer was actually Julia's ex-husband (Michael Lowry).

Tamara Tunie was a popular figure as DA Jessica in the 1980s and early 1990s. She returned to the show in 1999 but only began to receive leading material again in 2001. Unfortunately, much of that material served to, in the eyes of many fans, destroy her very self-assured, independent character. Jessica lost her job as district attorney to a sleazy lawyer named T. Marshall Travers (Lamman Rucker). In spite of this, she jeopardized her relationship with moral doctor Ben Harris in order to begin a hot and heavy affair with Marshall. When Jessica and Ben broke up, Marshall briefly moved into her home and many thought As the World Turns was going to begin a formal romance between the two. Instead, Marshall raped Jessica while she was asleep and a "he said/she said" rape trial commenced. During the early 2000s, As the World Turns was praised for bringing African-American characters like Jessica, Marshall, Ben, Bonnie (Napiera Danielle Groves), and Isaac (Paul Taylor) to the forefront. However, the newfound racial integration ended when Jessica's daughter Bonnie accidentally pushed Marshall out a window. Bonnie and Isaac promptly left the show (leading Isaac to sell "Java Underground", the hangout of the early-2000s, to Dusty, Molly, and Craig, who renamed it "Metro" (and who would later sell to Aaron and Alison), adopting Marshall's biological daughter (and chronic troublemaker) Sarah. Jessica reunited with Ben, leaving them the only two African-American leads left (besides Walker Daniels Real Andrews, a doctor who helped treat Barbara when she had a bout with brain cancer in spring 2004. When the briefly reformed Barbara returned to her evil ways, Walker left her—and Oakdale.) In 2004, Jessica and her best friend Margo Hughes fought over a sleazy football player-turned-sportcaster named Doc, in spite of both ladies' traumatic experiences with adultery and with shady men. Jessica had sex with Doc and had to figure out who the father of her child was. Doc was intended to be a roguish type of character but was so loathed by viewers that he did not even last six months. The soap magazines dubbed the storyline "worst of the year". Despite her dalliance with Doc, Margo and Tom reunited. Ben temporarily became addicted to pain killers, causing himself to be accused of causing Aaron's paralysis (since Aaron, injured in a boxing match, needed neurosurgery and only Ben was available.) Jessica had a miscarriage. All four characters then returned to the back burner, and Ben and Jessica seemed to vanish altogether for most of 2005.

The exits of Kaba, List and Dunphy moved the show to try to rebuild its teen scene. Tom and Margo's son Casey was recast for the third time in two years, and Barbara and Hal's son Will was aged to 17 years old. Will (Jesse Soffer) was very popular with fans, but Casey was not and was often written in a negative manner. Two other characters, however, were brought on who did not achieve widespread popularity. Rafael Ortega (first AJ Lamas, then Michael Cardelle), Lucy's best friend from Montega, and his younger sister Celia (Alyssa Diaz) appeared for the first time, and immediately dominated storylines. Rafael was recast within three months of his first appearance and he quickly began trying to control his sister's life. Many fans considered the actors playing these new "Montegan transplants" to be amateurs and even the writing was also decried as being amateur. In one scene, Rafael, Casey, and Will all joined Celia in the girls' bathroom; another scene featured Celia trying out for a singing competition and facing criticism from a "mean", Simon Cowell-like judge—the problem was that many fans agreed with his criticisms! In June 2005, Rafael was written out for good and more attention was paid to new teen arrival Gwen Norbeck (Jennifer Landon). In August 2005, Celia left Oakdale when her relatives asked her to come back to Montega and she accepted, saying farewell to some of her friends.

While the hijinks at Oakdale Latin High School continued, Lucinda's daughter Sierra (now played by Mary Beth Evans) became a regular on the show (after making only sporadic appearances for most of the past few decades). She began working at Lucinda's company, Worldwide, with Dusty Donovan (who'd dated her daughter Lucy before Lucy's exit from the show to attend college.) The two enjoyed a mild flirtation, while Sierra's ex-husband Craig worked with Jennifer (who started a fashion company, Street Jeans.) For a time the show seemed to be pushing Dusty towards Lucy's mother, Sierra, but then announced plans for a storyline with long-absent Snyder sister Meg (now played by Marie Wilson). For reasons that were never adequately explained by the show, Street Jeans fell under the control of Jennifer's evil mother Barbara. Upset that her mother took credit for her first successful fashion show and feeling abandoned by boyfriend Mike, Jennifer got drunk and had sex with Craig (the father of her former lover, Bryant). Mike discovered this and forgave Jennifer, but she was not yet home free, as she soon discovered she was pregnant.

Perhaps the most notorious hire from ABC was longtime One Life to Live actor Roger Howarth. Howarth was brought on as a recast for Paul Ryan. Some hardcore, devoted fans convinced themselves that his over-the-top take on the character was much more appropriate than his predecessor Scott Holroyd's subtle, layered, and charming performance, but many viewers felt that Howarth did not understand the Paul character and was simply playing him as he'd played his role on One Life to Live. With Howarth's hammy histrionics in full flame, Paul became a much less interesting, and severely damaged, character. Paul was engaged to Lily's twin sister Rose, who was torn between him and Dusty. On their wedding day, Paul verbally tore Rose to shreds at the altar. Rose collapsed and later died (Paul's younger brother Will, feeling she had created problems in the Ryan family, had actually poisoned her mouthwash). Lily plunged into depression and clung to Dusty, but the long-term story projections (which involved a Lily/Dusty and Holden/Molly pairing) were rejected by Procter & Gamble. Paul then began a relationship with Rosanna (Cady McClain), who was fresh off a divorce from Craig (Hunt Block) and then became involved with Jordan (Chris Beetem), the father of her young adopted son, Cabot. The fast-track romance baffled many viewers, as Paul suddenly began to be "happy" and with Rosanna spent significant chunks of time talking about how wonderful their lives were and how fantastic everything was. Cabot was presumed dead; but was actually kidnapped by James Stenbeck (back from the dead...yet again). After a story involving a hypnotized and drugged Emily Stewart (Paul's mother Barbara did it, framing her other son Will, and then eventually Rosanna), Stenbeck told Rosanna he would kill Cabot if she did not dump Paul and join him overseas. Rosanna did so and vanished for several months. Craig was kidnapped by Barbara and sent to Hong Kong - there he ran into Rosanna, who was being held prisoner because she had refused to marry James. James then planned to push her out of an airplane, but Craig sneaked on board and stopped him. He nearly killed James, but Rosanna asked him not to. Rosanna then decided to let Cabot find another home where he would not be under such stress. The Cabot storyline was viewed as a "black hole" by many fans, because so many characters who came into contact with the child (Rosanna, Craig, Jordan) were then quickly written out. Paul, meanwhile, began to grow close to his long-ago love Emily (when played by Andrew Kavovit and Melanie Smith during the late 1980s, Emily had deflowered a teenaged Paul). In July 2005, Rosanna was rushed to the hospital after a car she was driving was spun out of control by an equally out of control Craig Montgomery. Plunging into a coma, she was eventually sent to a hospital in Europe. Craig was arrested for trying to kill Rosanna. And in August 2005, Craig was sentenced to life in state prison after having committed numerous crimes.

The show's Emmy Award streak (which had begun at the 2001 awards show) came to an end in 2005, when only 3 actors (Howarth, Byrne, Jennifer Ferrin) were nominated for awards. The show did win for Outstanding Writing, but Sheffer did not attend the ceremony. Current head writer Jean Passanante accepted on his behalf and let viewers know that Sheffer was missed behind the scenes of As The World Turns.

Although As the World Turns had first been discussed online in the early 1990s by an eccentric group of posters on rec.arts.tv.soaps who came up with humorous names for the characters in their daily summaries (e.g. Easy for Emily, Juicy for Lucinda, Holdumb for Holden, etc.), it wasn't until the 2000s that As the World Turns began exploiting the internet for the first time. There were a few attempts at cross-promotion through the SoapCity website. During the 2001 season for example, viewers could read the Abigail character's e-mails to her mother Molly, boyfriend Adam, and other friends. She discussed the events that took place on the show, offering the viewer another perspective. In 2003, the show began repurposing itself daily through the SoapCity website for a small charge. Although this service was discontinued in March 2005, it was the first time As the World Turns had ever been repurposed.

In early 2005, it was announced that Hogan Sheffer would be taking a 17-week sabbatical from his writing duties. On April 11, 2005, however, it was announced that Sheffer would not be returning to As the World Turns at all and was being replaced permanently in his duties by co-head writer Jean Passanante. Although the last script credited to Sheffer aired on May 23, 2005, sources indicated that his work stopped airing at least a month before then. Sheffer was asked to return to the show a few months later. He agreed to do so, but only on the condition that he be made a breakdown writer instead of the head writer.

=== New beginnings ===
In mid-2005, soon after the show celebrated its 49th year on television and began its 50th year, came news that As the World Turns and its sister show Guiding Light had been renewed by CBS through 2007. Both were required to make budget cuts, asking some of the higher-paid actors to take pay cuts.

Passanante, who was originally only intended to be a temporary head writer, found herself permanently in the head writer's seat. She attempted to stay true to Sheffer's vision for As the World Turns while mixing in her own unique style. Leah Laiman and Christopher Whitesell served as her co-writers. Lisa Connor, Paula Cwikly, Charlotte Gibson, Hogan Sheffer, Trent Jones and Frederick Johnson (both ex The Young and the Restless, Emmy and WGA Award winners) all served as associate head writers during 2005. Also As the World Turns audio podcasts of episodes released the day after the episodes aired on CBS were released on the iTunes Music Store.

Celia and Casey, who had originally received much focus, were given less airtime upon the hiring of Jennifer Landon as Gwen, a teenage girl pregnant with Casey's child. Will, not wanting Celia to be disappointed in Casey, claimed Gwen's baby as his own. Meanwhile, Mike waffled back and forth between Jennifer and Katie. Jennifer and Dusty cooked up a scheme whereby Craig was forbidden from contact with his and Jen's child for five years, and Mike's discovery of this scheme landed him in bed with Katie. Former All My Children, Port Charles and The Bold and the Beautiful star Brian Gaskill signed on to join the soap as B.J. Green (aka Byron Glass), a high school classmate (and obsessed admirer) of Katie's, leaving Mike and Katie in yet another love triangle. B.J. hired Katie and Mike at WOAK after being made Kim's co-manager. He purchased Fairwinds and hosted a Halloween party there, revealing to Katie that he was actually the formerly obese high school nerd Byron. He continued stalking Katie through the end of 2005.

As Craig and Rosanna remarried and planned to adopt Gwen's baby, Jennifer went into labor, and Craig toyed with the idea of switching the babies, which he proceeded to do. "Jennifer's" baby (which was actually Gwen's baby) died, and Jennifer went into hysterics—upon looking at the dead baby's body, she remarked that it was not her child, but her family felt that her objectivity had been obscured and convinced her she was mistaken. Craig attempted to comfort Jennifer, but his wife Rosanna realized that he was not nearly as sad as was characteristic for Craig, considering that the dead baby was supposedly his.

Meanwhile, while flipping through a family scrapbook, Carly came upon a picture of her father at Mabel's Red Hots, a popular fast food restaurant in Oakdale. Carly, not aware that her father had ever been to Oakdale, showed the picture to many longtime Oakdale residents, including Lisa, Nancy, Kim, and finally to Susan, who told her that the man in the picture had been involved in "something horrible" at a clinic which had closed. Jack, wanting to get to the bottom of it, asked Jessica to open the file on the event. Jack decided it was too horrible for Carly to ever know, but the determined Carly paid Henry to find the woman who was with her father in the picture. The woman (Iris Dombrowski, played by Terri Garber) revealed that Carly had done something to her son, and then began to blackmail Carly.

Rosanna found out Craig switched the babies, but before she could tell Paul, Craig ran her car off the road. Rosanna was rendered comatose and Craig was shipped off to jail (written off the show, his trial presumably happening off-camera, though none of the other characters, including his sisters Katie or Margo ever referred to it), which kicked off an umbrella story focused on the struggles of those most affected by the baby switch. Carly and Gwen fought for custody of baby "Rory", neither realizing that child died at birth. The child's natural mother, Jennifer, was devastated by her loss. Paul (and soon Emily) found out about the switch, but kept quiet because he wanted Jennifer to be free of Craig. During the custody hearing, Gwen was forced to reveal the name of her baby's father. She told the truth (Casey Hughes was the father) but because of the baby switch, "Rory"'s DNA results did not match Casey's, and everyone thought Gwen lied. Gwen began to suspect Rory was not her real child. Paul began to work to undermine his brother Will's close friendship with Gwen, doing anything to keep Jennifer from her child. All the while Jennifer slid further and further into a crystal meth addiction, and Carly drugged Gwen to make her look like a bad mother. Gwen then reconnected with her deadbeat mother, Iris, who unbeknownst to her was blackmailing Carly. As Gwen suffered more and more setbacks, she became one of the breakout stars of the show. Paul had Jennifer committed after he realized she was on meth. Dusty, who had a casual sexual relationship with a fixated Meg Snyder, became very protective of Jennifer, or "Jenny" as he called her.

Lucinda contracted breast cancer and struggled to deal with showing weakness to the outside world. She discovered that Lily's boyfriend Keith smuggled human organs, and blackmailed him into helping her find experimental treatments for her cancer. The secrecy put a strain on Lily and Keith's relationship, and drew her closer to Holden.

The show remained in a consistent third place in the ratings for most of summer 2005, as other, more established shows such as General Hospital at times went into freefall. In September 2005 Procter & Gamble announced their daytime division head, Mary Alice Dwyer-Dobbin was leaving and the position was being eliminated, which led some fans to doubt about whether or not they wanted to continue producing As the World Turns or Guiding Light.

Under Passanante's ongoing tenure, the baby-switch story continued, with Carly finally realizing that she had not in fact killed Iris's baby, after all (Iris had orchestrated it to look that way), and that Iris had not even had a son but rather a daughter, who turned out to be Gwen (this made Gwen and Carly half-sisters, a plot twist that was criticized by a number of fans, since it contradicted Carly's age and history, in that she had to be rewritten as being eight to ten years younger to make the ages and dates correspond.) As both women struggled to absorb the fact that they were half-sisters, custody of the baby was given to Gwen (under the stipulation that she move back into her estranged, alcoholic mother's house for "stability"), when it came out that Carly had drugged Gwen. Meanwhile, Paul and Emily continued to work to keep Jennifer from learning the truth about the baby, going so far as to draw Meg (who had put the pieces together on her own) into their efforts. Meg eventually couldn't take the guilt and revealed to Dusty that she knew that Gwen's child couldn't possibly be hers. Paul and Emily were caught trying to delete hospital records concerning the child, and the child was ordered to be returned to Jennifer within the night. Gwen discovered that her baby had died and Casey finally apologized for not being there for her during her pregnancy.

In October 2005, Lucinda's cancer had metastisized to the point where she was forced to undergo a mastectomy, while Luke became consumed by an infection he'd picked up in Mexico (when he'd stowed away with his grandmother and Keith), which destroyed his kidneys. Lily turned to Keith, who agreed to find Luke an illegally obtained kidney on the condition that she agree to marry him. Lucinda and Holden soon discovered that Keith had obtained the kidney, but Lily feared that karma would allow something to happen to Luke if she went back on her word to Keith. She still could not deny her attraction to Holden, and after the two had sex, Keith finally left town. Emily continued to stand by Paul after their role in keeping the baby switch was discovered, until Paul dumped her on their wedding day. Emily then shot him. When B.J. Green tried to blow up the WOAK studios shortly before the new year, new character Nick Kasnoff (who replaced Jack on the police force) heroically stopped him. Dusty dumped Meg Snyder on New Year's Eve as they were about to get married because Dusty found out that Meg had a hand in covering up the baby swapping scheme by keeping silent that she knew that Jennifer was the mother. An injured Paul made it to a cabin out in the snowy woods, and Meg (who had been fired from Memorial) started taking care of him. Paul started losing a lot of blood, and Meg tried to get him to rest but Paul was becoming delusional that Emily and his sister, Jennifer, were trying to kill him. Susan became increasingly concerned for her daughter, Emily's, mental health and asked Hal to investigate. Hal put new cop, Nick, on the case. Jack was rehired by Hal at the police part-time, and had trouble getting along with Nick. Carly also had to contend with Nick's flirtations, which she really didn't want. Mike and Katie became engaged after Jennifer consented to a divorce, and they also forgave Maddie when she confessed that it was she who initially lured B.J. to Oakdale, not realizing how dangerous and unstable he really was. Conditions improved slightly for Gwen, when Lisa offered her a room and a job at the Lakeview. (Will went to stay with Bob and Kim.) Gwen's good fortune was short-lived, however, as Barbara caused Lisa to think Gwen stole an expensive piece of jewellery from a hotel guest, resulting in her being fired.

=== 2006 ===
As February 2006 began, Will and Gwen were once again homeless and jobless. Desperately, Will decided to steal a thousand dollars from Barbara's Lakeview suite, and while Gwen tried to talk him out of it, she eventually agreed to the plan, going along with him. When Barbara turned out to be present in the suite, she threatened to call the police, and in his struggle to get the telephone away from his mother, Will pushed her, and she hit her head. When she regained consciousness in the hospital, she claimed it was Gwen, not Will who had intentionally pushed her, and that Will was not even present. Will countered that it was he who had pushed his mother, but when Margo attempted to request the teens come into the station to be questioned, they fled, and a warrant was issued for their arrest. Meanwhile, Luke sneaked out of the house to meet Kevin, but when he decided to return home shortly thereafter, he struck a girl with his car. She turned out to be okay, but revealed a startling fact to Luke, Lily and Holden: she was Rose's daughter, Jade, who had been given up for adoption at birth.

Around this same time, Holden began to suspect that Luke might be gay and eventually Luke confirmed this when he came out to his parents. Lily was shocked, as was Damien, who had returned to town in June 2006. Damien convinced Lily he would solve the "problem" with Luke and attempted to send him to a summer camp that advertised "gender re-alignment". Luke rebelled against his mother, hurt by her reaction to his revelation that he was gay. Things were strained between them for quite a while and Luke eventually agreed to go to Krieger's "summer camp" and went upstairs to pack his things. Lily, discovering at the last minute that Damien had lied to her about the true purpose behind Krieger's "de-gaying" camp and regretting her alignment with him, rushed home in an attempt to reconnect with Luke. Still hurt and angry at his mother's continual rejection, believing she alone was behind the idea to send him away, Luke pushed a pregnant Lily away from him causing her to fall down a long flight of stairs and lapse into a coma.

In April 2006, town matriarch Nancy Hughes McClosky was honored by the Women's Guild for her fifty years of service. Lisa, Lucinda, Kim, Barbara, Susan and Emma all joined Nancy at a luncheon honoring her, but on their way back, the bus they had chartered went off the road (when Barbara, upset at having just learned of Paul and Emily's marriage) attempted to gain control of the steering wheel from the driver). Though no one was seriously injured, the seven women were stranded in woods all night long. To pass the time, they reminisced about their lives and loves through the previous several decades. (The special episode was written to commemorate ATWT's fiftieth anniversary.)

Emily, too, became pregnant during her short-lived sham marriage to Paul, and Paul convinced her not to have an abortion. Emily did, however, use stem cells from her baby to help Johnny, Jennifer's ill son. Jennifer (against the advice of Dr. Lucy Montgomery, who had just returned to Oakdale) signed herself out of the hospital when she had pneumonia. It developed into a rare virus and Jennifer died—but not before she married Dusty Donovan. On her deathbed, Jennifer asked Gwen to make a videodisc recording of her for Johnny.

Will and Gwen, now married and living with Hal, struggled to complete high school after missing months. Gwen graduated, but Will got caught cheating when Jade convinced him to buy papers off the Internet. A drunken Will also had sex with Jade, while Casey and Gwen got closer when they began working together at Lisa's new club, Crash (which moved onto the premises of what was Mabel's Red Hots.) Maddie and Casey decided to have sex, during which Maddie began to experience flashbacks of a dorm room. It was later brought to light (during a conversation with Oakdale's newest police officer, Dallas Griffin—Jessica's nephew) that she had been sexually assaulted a year before at a frat party in Chicago. She abruptly ended her relationship with Casey, leaving him wanting and confused. "Snotty teen" Lia then began making advances on Casey in such a way as to make Maddie even more jealous. When Lia was killed everyone accused Maddie of being her killer, and her friends turned her back on her. It was later revealed that Maddie's rapist was her Brother-in-law Louis, who Maddie protected in fear. Later evidence seemed to indicate that Louis was also the Oakdale Slasher.

All the show's teens—Gwen, Will, Maddie, Casey, Luke, Kevin (a friend of Luke's since the second grade as well as someone Luke has been pining for throughout the years), Jade, the final three being contestants of As the Worlds' In Turn contest (the winner of which would secure a thirteen-week contract on ATWT) and a busload of others—headed to Raven Lake for an end of summer bash at a campsite in the woods. During their time there, various teens reunited, apologized, and reconciled (Casey apologized to Maddie for thinking she was crazy after she confessed that she was raped, Gwen apologized to Will for not speaking up for him after he was accused of being the slasher, and Kevin apologized to Luke for calling him a faggot when Luke told him he was gay.) Various other teens (6 or 7 of them at least) as well as Maddie's brother-in-law/rapist Louis bled to death after being stabbed by the "Slasher". Maddie's sister, Eve, was revealed to be the "Slasher".

Soon afterwards, a freak ice storm paralyzed Oakdale, leading to several important developments. Emily had decided to run away, but instead found herself trapped at the Snyder farm with Meg; Emily went into premature labor, and despite the best efforts of Meg and Paul, who arrived at the last minute, she lost the baby, a daughter named Jennifer in honor of her late aunt, and great-grandmother.

While driving a sick Johnny to the hospital, Lucy had an accident, and was freed from her car by a mysterious stranger, who turned out to be her father Craig, who had been released from jail on a technicality. Craig's return, naturally, upset Dusty, Barbara and Paul; Barbara, particularly, accused Lucy (who was growing close again with Dusty) of helping her father, but Lucy proved her independence by revealing to Jack (who had a restraining order against Craig) that her father was faking the severity of his injuries (a tree had fallen on him during the storm). Craig further incensed Barbara when he proposed to donate funds to Oakdale Memorial to establish a stem cell research center in Jennifer's name.

Lily came out of her coma during the ice storm (during the coma, she gave birth to a son, Ethan), with visions of Rose before her, compelling her to resume her search for Rose's daughter, Theresa. At the same time, Jade, who had claimed to be Theresa earlier in the year, was forced by Luke to reveal that she was not, in fact, pregnant by Will.

Meanwhile, Carly, now divorced from Jack, was developing both a romantic and business relationship with Katie's ex-husband, Simon, who had returned to Oakdale, much to Katie and Mike's displeasure. (Mike and Katie had married in May, and ran into Simon and his then-girlfriend Vienna during their honeymoon.) Simon purchased a dilapidated building with the intent of refurbishing the site and renting it out; Carly signed on to be an interior decorator. During the ice storm, a telephone pole crashed into the building, nearly killing Carly. Desperate to find the funds to cover the re-building, Simon first tried to get money from Lucinda, but Mike told Lucinda that the building had a weak structure, so Simon turned to a notorious loan-shark for the money, much to Carly's displeasure.

Finally, Katie gave in to Simon, who was supposedly trying to say goodbye to her, and had sex with him. Katie tried to keep this a secret, but she typed it all on her laptop for her new Oakdale Confidential book. Lucinda convinced Mike over the phone to look at the story on Katie's laptop because the deadline for the story was that night. Mike read it all and left Katie.

On the night of the Oakdale Halloween Gala, Simon convinced Carly to help him steal one of the Prince's jewels, supposedly worth millions of dollars. They succeeded, and Simon gave the diamond to Carly as a necklace. Meanwhile, Carly's SORASed daughter Sage found a "magic crystal" which she included in her science project. Katie ransacked Carly's house and found what she thought was the diamond, but it turned out that the diamond had been accidentally switched with Sage's cubic zirconia. Simon got the crystal and threw it in a trash bin, but it came back to bite them again. A worker had found the jewel in the trash, and Bob and Kim got a hold of it, and Katie saw it, and has the 'proof' to arrest Simon and Carly.

Lucy, now desperate over what to do, tricked her father, Craig, telling him that he needed to go to the hospital for a doctor to examine his wound. She was really kidnapping Johnny, and taking him away; she thought that it would be better for Johnny if Dusty and Craig were out of his life. She took money from her father's safe, and convinced Lucinda to let her go. Lucy and Johnny are now out of town.

Faith, Lily's daughter, has caught on to her mother—they are both self-conscious about their weight. Faith also ran away because she thought that her parents were splitting up, when they really weren't. They found Faith hurt with her horse.

Casey now has a gambling addiction. He has lied to Maddie countless times, and blamed it all on Elwood (who has been pushing him to do it more), and was even visited by the poker site 'thug'.

Vienna, Carly and Katie had a catfight on Christmas Eve, ruining Emma's dinner. Carly broke up with Simon because of Jack's warnings.

Iris, Gwen's mother came back from jail to cause more trouble. She saw Gwen and Adam kiss in L.A. Gwen told Will about it, and he seems to be forgiving.

Paul wrecked his car on Christmas Eve, leaving Emma's rifle at the Snyder barn. Meg saved his life, and he is still critical, and had quite a freaky dream. He also had a vision that someone would give him medicine that would kill him—and it came true, to the shock of Susan.

=== 2007 ===
Emily interrupts Paul and Meg's wedding with the news that she had witnessed Paul trying to kill Craig, and Meg calls off the wedding in response. Emily and Meg free Dusty from jail. Craig is not arrested, but he swears revenge on Emily for her betrayal. Shortly afterward, Craig sells his half of The Intruder to a gangster, who then tries to force Emily to sign over her share of the paper to him. When she refuses to do so, he has her son Daniel kidnapped. Emily attempts to seek Tom's help in locating Daniel, but upon hearing the news, Tom has a heart attack and is rushed to Oakdale Memorial.

Jade enlists Cleo Babbit to impersonate Gwen, and end her relationship with Will. However, Cleo falls in love with Will. On their trip to Branson she gets mad when Will doesn't want to kiss her and knocks him over the head and then ties Jade and Gwen up to the train tracks. Will gets up and unties them just in the knick of time and Cleo goes off to a mental institute and Jade apologies and leaves town. The next thing is when this Ava Jenkins comes to town she wants a box from J. J. but he won't give it to her and then Ava's husband Silas kidnaps him and Ava writes a letter saying that they want $100,000,000 if Jack and Carly want to see J.J. alive. Carly then pays the money but Ava and Silas lies and says that they are gonna raise J.J. as their son. Carly and Jack then find J.J. and they take him home safe and sound. Then there is Noah Mayer whose father is Col. Winston Mayer and he killed his ex-wife known as Cheri Love and everyone thought it was Dusty but the truth came out. It was then revealed the Noah and Luke Snyder were in love. That was not ok for Noah's father who on a hunting trip shot Luke and he ended up in a wheelchair and Winston was off to prison. Eventually Katy and Jack married but when Carly was dying, and was later a misdiagnosis, so Katy and Jack split and him and Carly are about to get married when Carly tells him and he leaves her at the altar. Then there is Meg Snyder who married Craig and was only going to marry him to get the company Worldwide back but after Paul went over a cliff after a fight with Craig she stayed married to him. A month later Paul was alive and in a hospital in Switzerland, where Rosana was. She eventually wakes up from her coma and they head back to town and get married on Halloween day. But then Meg and Paul have sex and she finds out she's pregnant and later finds out the father is Paul by Rosana still doesn't trust him. Later a Cole comes to town with his girlfriend, Sofie and she gets pregnant. Since Will and Gwen can't have a baby, they are going to adopt there, not know whose it is. Craig finds out that the baby Meg is carrying is Paul's not his and he tries to drug her getting cut in the process.

=== 2008 ===
Gwen and Will's Baby - Sofie Duran is sad she gave up her baby and when Gwen and Will Munson choose Alison Stewart and Aaron Snyder to be the godparents to their baby, Hallie Jennifer Munson. Everything's going fine until Sofie kidnaps Hallie. She turns herself in and then decides that she wants her baby back. Gwen and Will win the custody battle. Gwen later returns Hallie to Sofie. Hallie becomes sick and needs a blood transfusion. Sofie tries to call Cole Norbeck, her ex and the baby's father, but there is no answer. Sofie realizes that she cannot take care of Hallie so she gives her back to her adopted parents. Later Gwen and Will leave town to get a new start.

Meg's Baby - In 2007, Meg Snyder had an affair with Paul Ryan and she got pregnant and every one thought Craig Montgomery was the father but later it was revealed that Rosanna Cabot switched the lab results and that Paul is really the father. When Craig finds out, Rosanna wants him to keep quiet. Craig tries to give Meg a drug that will make her have a miscarriage. Then he rethinks it and throws her glass that he put it in. When Meg takes him to the hospital Chris Hughes tells him his hand is infected by this drug and is suspicious. Meg finds out later from her friend Jan that Craig's hand is infected and remembers what happened and begins to wonder if Paul is the father. Later she and Paul do a DNA test and that proves Paul is the father. When Craig and Paul are fighting and push Meg down and she loses the baby. Paul wants Craig arrested but Meg doesn't want that. Paul and Rosanna break up and so does Meg and Craig and Rosanna relapses into her coma.

Bob Hughes Hospital - In 2007, Bob Hughes had a stroke which was caused by a temper flare that Chris Hughes caused. Dusty Donovan overheard them arguing and nobody believes him and Tom Hughes tells him to stay away from his family. Dusty believes Chris poisoned his father and wants to find proof and has Alison Stewart spy on him. He finally wakes up. It was revealed later that Evan Walsh poisoned him.

Lily-Dusty-Emily - A while ago, Dusty Donovan and Emily Stewart dated and started a tabloid together. She left town in 2007 only to return later that year and Dusty wanted her back, except she was with Chris Hughes. He and Lily Snyder stated dating but when he had sex with Emily, it was the end of them.

Jack-Katie-Brad – In 2007, Jack Snyder and Katie Peretti fell in love and got married. They got their marriage annulled because he started spending too much time with Carly Tenney because she was "dying" but she really wasn't and she Carly and Jack were going to get remarried but he left her at the altar. Then Katie wanted to make a baby with Jack's brother Brad Snyder. Then Katie joined a speed dating program and thought she had found someone until Brad messed it up. When on a road trip Brad admits to Katie he loves her. Later in April Brad proposes to Katie and she says yes.

Carly's Story - Carly Tenney loves Jack Snyder but he loved Katie Peretti. Then Kit Fowler and Sam Hutchins come to stay with her. Kit goes off to jail New Year's Eve and the re-opening of Metro is going to happen. And so it does. Sam then starts to fall for Carly. When Parker Snyder leaves his Science book there on purpose and goes back. Then he steals money from Metro and tries to frame Sam. Parker then steals "Cowboy Jack", Sam's dummy and later Sam throws "Cowboy Jack" in the fireplace at Carly's house to make it look like Parker did it. Sam then tried to rape Carley and Parker shoots and kills him. Carly and Jack try to prove that Parker did not kill Sam but, Kit did. Carly finds a lady who saw Kit disguised as a bag later, testifies, and Parker is free.

Barbara's Cancer - Early 2008 Barbara Ryan was diagnosed with oral cancer. On April 6 Barbra must be rushed in to have tumor removed. {This story is inspired by Colleen Zenk Pinter's real-life battle with cancer.}

Casey's Return – On January 29, Casey got released from prison and returned to town. He paid a cop to say something good about him but he didn't have the money so he has to pay him later. When his friend Matt reveals that the cop wants his money, he robs The Lakeview.

Who Killed Dusty? – A celebration is on at the hospital, ME, and Chris Hughes are the guest-of-honor. Dusty Donovan is going to prove that Chris poisoned his father and got Dusty killed. (Was hated by-Lucinda Walsh, Chris Hughes, Lily Snyder, Holden Snyder, Emily Stewart, and Tom Hughes) Holden is arrested and is later released on bail. It is later revealed-while holding Lily Snyder and Lucinda Walsh hostage-that it was Evan Walsh who killed him.

Henry Coleman-Vianna Hyatt-Gray Gerald – A man comes to town by the name of Gray Gerald and he tries to steal Vienna Hyatt from Henry Coleman

Gray Gerard/Margo Hughes/Tom Hughes – Gray's real name was Gerald Nevins. Casey called Margo with the news and Margo realized that it could not be a coincidence. Gray must be related to her rapist. Since Gray was wanted for racketeering by the FBI, Matt was supposed to be taken into custody for questioning. Instead he was kidnapped by Gray and brought to the Hughes house while Casey and Alison were there. Gray held the group hostage and forced Casey to call his mother by threatening to kill Alison. When Margo arrived, Gray held her hostage as well and revealed that he was Roy Nevins's brother. Gray blamed Margo for his brother's death that he waited years to get his revenge. Gray set a bomb and walked out. The bomb was defective and failed to go off. That same night, Gray sneaked into the Hughes home to finish what he started. Allison returned to get her cell phone and while talking with Margo spotted Gray with a gun. Alison shoved Margo out of the way. When Tom ran down to stop Gray, he was overpowered and Margo shot Gray to keep him from killing Tom. Though Margo assured Tom and everyone that she was alright, the incident rattled Margo to the core.

Luke Snyder/Noah Mayer/Ameera Ali Aziz – Luke supports Noah and Ameera Ali Aziz, a young Iraqi woman who is going to be deported and who has connections to Colonel Mayer. In their efforts to go visit the Colonel in prison, the trio is attacked en route by bigots. Noah is badly hurt after being hit with a tire iron, but Luke manages to protect his friends, and prevents the men from kidnapping Ameera until Holden and Lily stumble across the scene and help. Luke commits to helping Noah as he supports Ameera's efforts to stay in the United States.

When Ameera is about to be deported by Homeland Security, Noah decides that the only way to keep her in the country is to marry her. Luke struggles with the idea. Luke asks Noah if he loves him, and for the first time Noah is able to say that he loves Luke. Luke and Noah tell Holden and Lily about Noah's plan, and Lily and Holden agree to help. Luke gives his blessing for the wedding but quietly struggles watching the man he loves marry someone else, knowing their relationship will once again have to be kept secret. He agrees to be Noah's best man, and even writes his wedding vows. At the end of the day, looking over the wedding certificate, Luke mentions that he hopes he and Noah will have one with their names on it some day.

Return of Mike Kasnoff – Katie's ex-husband returned to Oakdale (now working for a real estate development company) to propose a deal to Emma Snyder to buy some of the land she owns. Paul Ryan and Lucinda Walsh (working together at Worldwide) are also interested in the land. Emma leans towards going with Mike but Paul convinces Emma he and Mike can work together. Meg is also pleased with this. Mike almost leaves town after finding out Katie is engaged but is convinced by Paul and Meg to stay and work on the development project. Mike runs in to Carly and they chat. She tried to convince him Katie is still available. Anything to keep her away from Jack. Mike also finds out Katie and Jack were married and divorced while he was away. Mike then seeks out Margo and when he shows up at her home he interrupts Katie and Brad's engagement party. Katie seems happy Mike is back but makes it immediately clear she is engaged to Brad. The next day, they meet up for coffee.

Casey Hughes/Emily Stewart – After being fired from the Lakeview, Casey goes to work for Emily as her assistant. Margo is not happy about this at all and tells Emily so. Later, an Oakdale judge bursts into Emily's office irate because she published a story about him having an affair. He holds Casey and Emily in Emily's office. Casey talks him down and after Margo arrives, the judge us taken away and Margo tells Casey he must leave his job with Emily. He refuses but Emily fires him anyway.

Parker Snyder/Liberty Ciccone – When Liberty showed up in Oakdale, everyone knew she was trouble. Parker found that out first hand when he and she would skip school, and when she jumped into the lake for $20. Parker started developing a crush on Ashley, but could not kiss her because he did not know how. That same day, Liberty "taught him". Liberty and Parker would get closer and closer until July 24, 2008, when they lost their virginities to each other.

Return of Dr. Rick Decker

=== 2009 ===
Johnny & Lucy (December 2008-January 2009) - December 2008 Lucy and Johnny return to town because Johnny is very sick and needs bone marrow and they are trying to hide from everyone in town until Josie comes finds out they are back in town and she tells Dusty whom goes to the Lakeview searching for them and sees them in a room at the Lakeview. He finds them and helps Johnny by getting Katie to deliver bone marrow. Katie then tells Craig that Johnny is with Lucy in Oakdale. Craig wants Lucy arrested for kidnapping. Johnny lives with Lucy and Dusty and Craig gets permission to see him. Craig gives Johnny a hug and Dusty punches him and gets arrested. Emily offers to marry Dusty like Carley is with Craig so he can show that he is starting a family but Dusty declines the offer. He later marries Meg and Paul reveals at the herring that it's invalid, which it was. Craig gets custody of Johnny.

Noah and Luke's Breakup (January 2009) - At the beginning of 2009 Casey and Alison try to reunite the couple after hearing of their breakup. Their attempt fails and Luke scolds Casey for interfering. Eventually Jade and Casey both force Luke and Noah to confront each other and they both realize they are still in love and reunite.

Henry's Book (December 2008-January 2009) - Vienna found Henry's book which he wrote about Lucy and Johnny. She gets his book, The Man from Oakdale, published for him in January.

Brian's Secret (2008-January 2009) - After his marriage to Lucinda, Brian makes a few passes at Luke to which Luke is horrified but does not reveal anything to Lucinda. Luke gets drunk believing Noah is cheating with Maddie and kisses Brian believing he is the only one who cares for him. Noah sees this happen and believes Brian is making the moves and physically attacks Brian. Noah breaks up with Luke after Luke comes clean and Jade covers for Brian after seeing the whole incident unfold. In January 2009 while Lucinda is abusing Jade, Jade reveals that Brian is gay and Lucinda kicks him out after learning of his feelings for her grandson. Brian comes to terms with his homosexuality with the help of Noah and Lucinda and leaves town.

Meg/Paul/Dusty (January 2009-Present) - Meg wants a divorce from Paul. Dusty proposes to Meg but she wants to make sure her divorce with Paul is final. Dusty marries Meg while they are in Reno.

Josie as Jennifer (2008-January 2009) - Paul figures out that Josie is not his dead sister, Jennifer. Paul gets advice from her on how to deal with Meg. She later leaves town.

Casey & Alison (January 2009-Present) - When Casey spends too much time with Jade, Alison thinks he likes her. Throughout the year they break up and get back together.

Craig & Carly (January 2009-Present) - Craig proposes to Carly which she accepts. She backs out of the wedding at the last minute.

Jade's Father (January 2009) - Derek Corburn is revealed to be Jade's father.

Katie's Baby (January 2009-Present) - Katie and Brad try to have a baby. Kim wants to make a reality show about it but only if Brad can have his job back at Oakdale Now. They put having a baby on hold when they find out Katie has reproductive problems.

Paul's Kidnapping of Eliza (February 2009) - While at the Lakeview the lights go off and Paul kidnaps Eliza; Josie finds them and calls Dusty to tell him where they are.

Carly's Alcoholism (February 2009-July 2009) After the stress of her divorce, Parker's marriage and moving into the vodka business Carly began drinking. Her drinking started to become obvious when Carly constantly became extremely drunk numerous times, flirting with strangers and also becoming abusive. Carly then started to lie about her drinking and was drinking first thing in the morning. Carly was then arrested for a DUI but that did not stop her as she then got extremely drunk and tried to kill Craig by running him down with her car. The toll the drinking was taking on Carly became more obvious as she was blacking out. She was also now becoming so drunk that she has verbally abused her young daughter Sage for not agreeing with her wedding to Craig and assaulted and kicked her sister Rosanna out of her house. Her family held an intervention and Carly realized the toll her addiction was taking on herself and her family, so Craig checked her into rehab.

Noah's Kidnapping (April 2009 – May 2009) - Noah Mayer was kidnapped by the disgruntled daughter of a Grimaldi family member. He was held at ransom for the Grimaldi fortune which Luke Snyder inherited, believing she was the rightful recipient. Luke was subsequently also kidnapped after falling into a trap trying to rescue Noah and Lily was held at gun point. Luke's father Damien Grimaldi eventually rescued the boys but not before Noah had been shot and as the kidnapper Zoe Finn attempted to rape Luke in order to become pregnant with a legitimate Grimaldi heir. The two kidnappers were subsequently arrested after Casey notified Margo of their whereabouts after discovering a clue and Noah recovered from his gunshot wound.

Riley's Story (June 2009-September 2009) - Margo is confronted with devastating news – her son Adam is dead. At the memorial service, Sgt Riley Morgan turns up claiming to be a friend of Adam's in Kabul before Adam was killed in the explosion. Margo immediately invites Riley to stay with them on hearing he has nowhere to go. Margo latches on to Riley as her last connection to her son. Tom and Casey however are not so trusting. Noah Mayer's father Col Mayer returns to town and is threatening Riley to help him see Noah; otherwise he will reveal Riley's true identity to Margo. During a confrontation between Riley and Col Mayer, Margo intervenes but is shot by Col Mayer after losing concentration by the shock of seeing Col Mayer alive. Riley runs to Margo's side calling her Mom. Margo then reveals that she has known all along that Riley was really Adam as a mother would always know her child and that she said nothing because she didn't want to see another son arrested. Adam reveals that he was severely injured in the explosion in Kabul and required extensive reconstructive surgery. Once healed he did not recognize himself in the mirror and saw it as the perfect opportunity to start a new life with his beloved family. After Adam's presence creates tension in the Hughes household, Adam decides to leave town and is also cleared of his criminal charges by Gwen Munson and Maddie Coleman.

Col Winston Mayer is Alive (June 2009 - July 2009) - Noah is working on a movie for school about his life growing up as an Army brat. When he needs access to an army site he engages Riley's help in gaining access to the site. When Riley arrives at the army base to speak with Lt Hasbro, the man he meets is not Lt Hasbro but Col Winston Mayer and the base turns out to be unused. Col Mayer blackmails Riley into agreeing to get Noah to come to the base alone and without Luke. If Riley does not do this, Col Mayer threatens to reveal Riley's true identity. Meanwhile, Casey comes to Noah with information that Riley is not who he says he is because the real Riley Morgan was killed in Kabul. Luke forbids Noah from visiting the base so Noah goes to Java to get his shifts back. While walking into Java, Noah is grabbed from behind by Col Mayer. Noah is shocked to see that his Dad is alive and Col Mayer talks Noah into coming to a quiet location to talk. When back at the abandoned base Noah and his father discuss everything that his father has done to Noah and Noah tells his Dad he wants him in jail. Col Mayer reminds Noah that he loves him and accepts him and wants to start a new life with his son. Eventually Noah agrees to leave Oakdale with his dad and go on the run. As they are planning to leave Luke and Damien arrive in time to talk to Noah and remind him of all the things he has done such as murdering Noah's mother, attempting to murder Luke and Dusty and now shooting Margo. Noah finally realises that the only right thing is to call the police and report his father as a fugitive. Col Mayer is in turn arrested.

James Stenbeck is Alive... Again! (August 2009-) - James Stenbeck was found by Paul, who is at what he thinks is a doctor's office but is really James's hideout. James returns with Paul to Fairwinds and he reveals to Barbara that James isn't dead. He then reveals that Audrey Coleman is a former fling of his that resulted in her getting pregnant with Henry! Henry and Audrey then find out that James is dying and will receive a substantial portion of the Stenbeck fortune.

== History of title sequences ==
The show changed opening title sequences from the original format several times:

=== 1956–1981 ===
Since the show's premiere on April 2, 1956, the show's announcer was Dan McCullough, from April 2, 1956 to January 8, 1982 whose voice is heard during the opening sequence.

The show used the same theme song for 25 years (an organ-piano tune for the opening theme and an organ-.?piano-celesta tune for the long closing theme - the transition into pre-recorded versions occurred in December 1973 and these were composed by Charles Paul)) The accompanying visual sequence of a globe spinning in space is a very widely recognized piece of opening footage in the area of television. During the "black-and-white" years, the globe was in the distance and to the right of the camera; as the theme played, the camera zoomed in until the globe was centered and the title card faded up whilst Dan McCullough provided the voiceover dialogue. For the midbreaks and closing titles, the globe was in the center of the screen.

Color brought some minor changes. The globe was now always on center. The title zoomed out from the middle of the globe. The organ version of the main theme was used over the color visual until early December 1973, when the theme became orchestrated.

Prior to 1973, Charles Paul played a celeste composition called "Simple Melody" over the midbreak plugs. During 1973, organ music was dropped from the body of the show, in favour of electric piano only. However, it was not until December 10, 1973 that the orchestrated opening and closing themes replaced the live organ versions.

The sponsor tags from the show's premiere until the opening sequence was changed in 1981 were hand drawn pictures of the product, or the name of the product, superimposed over the globe. On a 1965 closing sequence, the sponsor tag was an actual photo card of the product.

=== 1981–1999 ===
On November 2, 1981, a new synthesized theme song was introduced, with computer-enhanced visuals. The globe was relegated to an O in the word WORLD, with three beams of light reflecting separate ways. The globe was on the center of the screen for the closing sequences.

On January 11, 1982, McCullough was replaced as announcer, by Dan Region.

On February 3, 1993, the theme song and opening visual was changed again. The theme song is "Jelinda's Theme" by David Foster.

The credits were done by computer specialist group Castle/Bryant/Johnsen.

In the visuals, the letters of the title slowly passed by, with the four seasons illustrated inside the letters, an ode to the original poem written by As the World Turns creator Irna Phillips. When the visual reached the O in WORLD, a spinning globe fell into its place and the whole title was zoomed out of focus, to be seen by the audience.

For a brief period, the globe was used to promote the viewer feedback line. Beauty shots were then used for the credit crawl. A credit crawl was run almost daily, either short or full crawl. This was the last title sequence to use traditional closing credits.

=== 1999–2002 ===
The show changed its music and opening again on November 1, 1999. For the first time, cast shots (both solo and group) were seen, accompanied by music. (As the World Turns had been one of the last soaps to incorporate cast shots into their openings.)

The globe was now made up of clips from throughout the show's history.

The closing credits were never seen on the air on CBS, but they were seen in rebroadcasts on SoapCity.com.

The visual returned to seeing a spinning globe (the computerized globe of clips from the opening) in space with the credits scrolling, ending with the title.

For the first time in the series history, As the World Turns had no official announcer or show announcements, although a station announcer would announce the sponsor tags on days where the show was sponsored. Cast members also made special announcements.

=== 2002–2007 ===
A new sequence, featuring clips of the cast, and a more "mellow" music selection, debuted on July 8, 2002.

The backdrop for the actor clips was gold, changed to sky blue in November 2003. The music from 2002 remained intact. Several shorter versions of this intro were used, rotating from day to day, and each featuring different members of the cast. There are two versions of closing credits. The globe fades off as the credits run. There is no closing title card, as the background fades up and the crawl runs. The closing logo is the 1993 version, now in white. In September 2006, a temporary intro was introduced to mark the "Ice Storm" theme of the next few shows.

=== 2007–2009 ===
A new opening sequence premiered on April 23, 2007. It featured a dramatic, piano-based score, accompanied by shots of the main characters (usually in pairs with their storyline counterparts), and composite images of the characters' histories superimposed over their shots against a gold background.

The logo that had been used since 1999 was replaced with one which kept the globe in place of the "O" in "WORLD", but the logo typeface was changed and "AS THE" in the title aligned to the right instead of the center.

=== 2009–2010 ===
On June 22, 2009, the show debuted yet another new sequence, with a spinning globe and one full line of text entering from the right side of the screen to the middle in front of the globe. In the background is a faded version of the show title in larger letters.

This new title sequence has a stark resemblance to the original title sequence from 1956 with a modern flair.

Production ended on June 23, 2010, in their Brooklyn, New York studios, with the final episode airing on September 17 of that year.
