= Mike Kasnoff =

- As the World Turns character
- Portrayed by: Shawn Christian (1994–97); Mark Collier (2002–07, 2009); Jon Prescott (2008)
- Duration: 1994–97; 2002–09
- First appearance: February 1994
- Last appearance: November 11, 2009
In-universe information
- Parents: Nora Kasnoff
- Siblings: Mark Kasnoff; Sarah Kasnoff
- Wife: Jennifer Munson (2005–06); Katie Peretti (2006–07); Anna Kasnoff (2009–)
- Children: Nora Kasnoff; Caroline Kasnoff
- First cousins: Nick Kasnoff

Michael "Mike" Kasnoff is a fictional character on the daytime soap opera As the World Turns. Mike was first portrayed by Shawn Christian from February 1994 to March 1997. After a five-year absence, Mike returned to Oakdale in July 2002, portrayed by Mark Collier, who played Mike until January 2007. On April 2, 2008, the character of Mike again returned to Oakdale, played by Jon Prescott. Prescott last aired in October 2008; Collier returned to the role of Mike on November 11, 2009.

== Storylines ==
In 1994, as an auto mechanic, Mike meets wealthy Rosanna Cabot when he is hired to fix her car. Mike's dream is to become a race car driver and Rosanna helps him to realize it, Both soon fall for one another. In 1995, Rosanna's half-sister, Carly Tenney comes to town, Mike does not know that Rosanna and Carly are related. After a drunken night, Rosanna rejects Mike, and by chance he runs into Carly, at a bar. Carly has no idea that Mike and Rosanna had hoped to marry. Mike took Carly to his apartment, where they have sex. In 1996, Rosanna & Mike continued to have misunderstandings that kept them apart due to the machinations of Carly and Scott Eldridge.

He has a relationship with Jennifer Munson (played by Jennifer Ferrin) and with Katie Peretti. He returns to Oakdale temporarily to help Jack Snyder and Katie Peretti through their grief after Brad Snyder's death. He soon tells them that he is now married to a woman named Anna, and has a daughter named Caroline.

== Reception ==
In 2021, Richard Simms from Soaps She Knows noted that Mike had been more popular than his brother, Mark, saying that "While Mike would have a long list of lovers and be played by three different actors over a period of nearly 15 years, poor Mark had basically one love interest and exited Oakdale after two years."
