= Rosanna Cabot =

- As the World Turns character
- Cady McClain as Rosanna Cabot
- Portrayed by: Yvonne Perry (1992–1999); Cady McClain (2002–2010)
- Duration: 1992–1999, 2002–2005, 2007–2010
- First appearance: 1992
- Last appearance: September 15, 2010
- Created by: Douglas Marland
- Introduced by: Laurence Caso (1992); Christopher Goutman (2002, 2007)
In-universe information
- Occupation: Entrepreneur
- Parents: Alexander Cabot; Sheila Washburn Cabot
- Half-brothers: Peter Cabot
- Half-sisters: Carly Tenney; Lauren Cabot
- Husband: Craig Montgomery (2003–04, 2005–07); Jordan Sinclair (2004); Paul Ryan (2004–05, 2007–08)
- Adoptive sons: Cabot Sinclair
- Uncles: Lee Washburn
- Nieces and nephews: Nora Kasnoff; Parker Snyder; Joseph James "J.J." Snyder (adoptive); Sage Snyder

Rosanna Cabot is a fictional character on the American daytime soap opera, As the World Turns. The character was originated by Yvonne Perry, who portrayed her from 1992 to 1999. In 2002, Daytime Emmy-winner Cady McClain took over the role and was consequently nominated twice for "Outstanding Supporting Actress" in 2003 and 2004, winning the award in the later year. She portrayed the role until 2005, before returning three times from 2007 to 2010.

== Casting and creation ==
The role of Rosanna was originated by actress Yvonne Perry. In 1993, she won the Soap Opera Digest award for Outstanding Female Newcomer, which was the show's first win in that category. During Perry's tenure on the show, Rosanna had love stories with the characters Hutch Hutchinson (Judson Mills), Evan Walsh (Greg Watkins) and Scott Eldridge. But it was the love story between Mike Kasnoff (Shawn Christian) and Rosanna Cabot (then played by Perry) that made the character so popular. She last appeared in the role in 1999.

In 2002, it was announced that actress Cady McClain, most known for her portrayal of Dixie Cooney on ABC's soap opera, All My Children, had been cast in the role of Rosanna.

In a letter on her official site, McClain spoke about why she chose to take the role of Rosanna. She stated:

Personally, after Sept 11th, I started to reevaluate my life, as many of us have. I realized I was tired, creatively and physically, and I needed...something. A break, a change, something different to wake up my insides. It is hard work being an actor; it takes a lot of constant revitalization to give as much energy as we do. Originally, I had no real "plan." I just wanted to leave contract status and "keep the door open," as we say, so that Dixie could come back here and there. I still feel that way. She is pregnant, in Europe, and with a delicate physical condition, so...anything could happen in any amount of time. The powers that be were kind enough to leave me with this exit, and I am so very grateful to them. I never have taken their kindnesses for granted, nor do I intend to. It is just too important to me for that. When I was approached a few weeks after I shot my last day at AMC with the idea of coming to ATWT for a little stint to try out an old character that they were working on, I felt very flattered and interested to join the cast and try something new. I don't think you know this, but I have been a huge fan of ATWT. I know almost the characters, and who they've been involved with. I even feel a little star struck around certain actors who shall remain nameless!

McClain continued to portray the role, earning two nominations for "Outstanding Supporting Actress" during the 2003 and 2004 Daytime Emmys, the latter of which she won. In 2004, it was heavily rumored that McClain had been let go from the series due to budget cuts. However, executive producer quickly debunked such rumors, stating, "As far as the show is concerned, Cady McClain is and will continue to be a valued cast member of As The World Turns. Cady has brought her incredible talent to her portrayal of Rosanna, as witnessed by last year's [Outstanding Supporting Actress] Emmy nomination. Cady and her character are definitely part of future story plans.".

In early 2005, McClain announced her decision to depart the series, which sparked the interest of the actress returning to her All My Children counterpart, Dixie. McClain returned to the role of Dixie following her World Turns exit. McClain's last airdate as Rosanna aired on July 29, 2005. McClain then returned to All My Children later that year.

Following McClain's departure, rumors began to fuel a possible recast of the character. However, this was not the case. In May 2007, it was announced that McClain would once again resurrect the character of Rosanna, following her firing from All My Children. She returned to the role on July 30, 2007 McClain's return was cut short, the actress announced her decision decided to leave the show once again, due to the upset she had over the loss of dignity the character once had. She last aired on January 28, 2008.

Following her As the World Turns departure, it was rumored that McClain would join the cast of "Guiding Light" in the role of Harley Cooper. However, those rumors were debunked when McClain stated she had no intentions of joining the soap and later announced that she had agreed to once again return to As the World Turns. However, it was stated that her stint would not be permanent. She appeared from May 2009 to December 18, 2009. McClain then returned again in September 2010 for the finale of the series.

== Development ==
Actress Cady McClain was upset with the direction Rosanna's character went during her return in 2007. When asked how her exit was in an interview with Soap Opera Weekly, she said, "Let’s put it this way: As the person who plays this character, it was an emotional hysterectomy. Rosanna’s womb, adopted child, and business exited stage left. Apparently, there was nothing left to take but her dignity." She later added, "I don’t know. I cannot understand why in a medium that caters to women, intelligent female characters have to be set up to be stupid and emotionally impulsive… 'punished' for actions they would never have taken without a gun to their head… and left begging and pathetic. As an actress, it was not romantic. It was embarrassing. Almost as bad as the pancakes, and that’s saying something. I have to wonder what the hell is going on these days. Are strong, smart women so threatening that they have to be vilified? I think they should be celebrated, but what do I know? Maybe I need a boob job."

In 2009, McClain took part in an interview with soapcentral.com owner Dan J. Kroll. During the interview, McClain stated that she did not think anyone in daytime would hire her again and that she would not apologize for being honest.

== Storylines ==
=== 1992–99 ===
Rosanna is the only child of the married Alexander Cabot and Sheila Washburn. She arrives in Oakdale in 1992, wanting to have a small-town experience like her recently deceased mother. She goes on to live at the Snyder farm and becomes very close to Emma Snyder (Kathleen Widdoes). Despite trying to pass herself off as an average girl, Evan Walsh eventually discovers that Rosanna is an heiress and is worth millions. Rosanna dates farm boy Hutch Hutchison, but their relationship is ruined due to his fling with Debbie Simon. She then dates Evan briefly. Rosanna's father Alexander marries Evan's snobbish mother Edwina, who she does not get on with.

Rosanna meets mechanic Mike Kasnoff, who she goes on to date. They are one of the show's supercouples, but they clash due to her wealth and his status as an ex-convict. Rosanna's father disapproves of Mike and during an argument, Alexander dies of a heart attack and leaves Rosanna all of his money. Although Rosanna wants nothing to do with the money or power her father has bestowed upon her, and Mike very much wants her to rid herself of the money, Rosanna's relationship with Mike collapses before she can give away her fortune.

In 1995, Carly Tenney plots to worm her way into Rosanna's life, knowing she is also Sheila's daughter. Sheila had abandoned her daughter and marriage to Ray Tenney to run off with Alexander when Carly was a child and the latter swore she would receive a slice of the good life as well. Carly secretly has sex with Mike Kasnoff, Rosanna's fiancé, and becomes pregnant. She interrupts Mike and Rosanna's wedding with her bombshell. After the truth is revealed, Carly and Rosanna are constantly at each other's throats and though she eventually reconciles with Mike, she becomes addicted to gambling. When they try to elope in Atlantic City, Rosanna becomes so busy playing the slot machines that she barely remembers she is there for a wedding, and the couple do not go through with the ceremony. Tragedy strikes during an argument the sisters are having. Rosanna, who has had enough, turns to walk away when Carly grabbed her hand to stop her. When Rosanna jerks her hand away, Carly fell and goes into premature labor, giving birth to a stillborn child, Nora, named after Mike's late mother. When Mike hesitates to assure Rosanna that the baby's death was not her fault, Rosanna knows the relationship is over and leaves for Europe with a message for Carly: she will receive $50 million if she gives birth to a child in wedlock, provided the man is not Mike Kasnoff. Later, she adds a deadline to the deal, with Carly having to give birth by December 31, 1998. Carly makes the deadline when she gives birth to Parker Munson, but she had committed fraud in the process, nullifying her claim to the money. Rosanna takes back the $50 million from her sister but sets up a trust fund for her nephew.

=== 2002–05 ===
When Rosanna returns from Europe in 2002, she is given temporary custody of Parker. This makes her the town pariah, who believe that she had obtained the child simply to hurt Carly, who is incapable of caring for her son at the time. She shares an emotional reunion with Mike in August 2002. She also strikes a friendship with Craig Montgomery, who is infatuated with her sister. This later turns into romance and the duo marry in a low-key ceremony. Carly and Rosanna also finally put aside their differences when Carly gives birth to Sage Snyder. Sage's birth leads Rosanna to want a child of her own but having undergone a hysterectomy, she chooses to adopt. Craig, having lost his son, Bryant, does not want another child but appeases Rosanna by agreeing. Later, she finds out he has been sabotaging their adoption process and is prepared to leave him before Craig shows up with a child at their home. Rosanna loves her new son, whom they name Cabot, and revels in motherhood and a newfound friendship with Paul Ryan. Her happiness is short-lived when she learns that Cabot had been illegally adopted, which devastates Rosanna completely when she has to relinquish her rights to him and give him up to his Canadian birth mother. She leaves Oakdale to pull herself back together and serves Craig with divorce papers upon her return. Though he attempts to fight her, she reminds him that she can take everything from him and is letting him keep his money and Metro Court. She also consequently ends her friendship with Paul, who had turned Craig in to the police, causing them to lose Cabot. In secret, however, Rosanna is concocting a plan with Carly to marry new BRO employee, Jordan Sinclair, and worm her way into his life. When Jordan learns of her true intentions, he is enraged, which prompts Rosanna to confess that Cabot's birth mother had promised her that if she married Jordan, her son would be returned to her. Not knowing why he was singled out and not appreciating having been used, Jordan refuses to enter a marriage of convenience but changes his mind when Rosanna consequently has a breakdown upon his departure.

After marrying Jordan, they learn that he is Cabot's biological father. The latter demands a role in his son's life, which unsettles Rosanna, but she agrees. They also learn that James Stenbeck had been instrumental in bringing them together and it is revealed that Stenbeck was Jordan's biological father. Realizing that this was his way of insinuating himself into their lives, Rosanna runs away with Cabot but is brought back by Jordan. Later, Stenbeck becomes increasingly diabolical when he demands that Rosanna and Jordan consummate their marriage, which the latter refuses to since he is in love with Jennifer Munson and Rosanna with Paul Ryan. His father retaliates by kidnapping both his wife and son and traps them in a burning building. Though Paul manages to save Rosanna, Cabot seemingly dies in the fire. Inconsolable with grief, Rosanna breaks all ties with him and finds comfort in Jordan's arms. Jordan leaves town after annulling their marriage. Rosanna temporarily moves in with Emma Snyder to deal with her pain. She eventually forgives Paul and they marry.

Rosanna is haunted by visions of her son, however, and this goes beyond the metaphysical when she keeps finding Cabot's playthings out of storage. When the perpetrator is revealed to be Emily Stewart, an investigation os launched and it is later determined that Barbara Ryan, Rosanna's mother-in-law, has been drugging Emily to get back at Rosanna for marrying Paul, killing two birds with one stone by using a long-standing enmity with Emily to destroy her daughter-in-law emotionally. Barbara is revealed to be in cahoots with her ex-husband, James Stenbeck, who had saved Cabot from the fire. He later reveals this to Rosanna, and demands that she falsely implicate herself in Emily's drugging in order to spare Barbara from prosecution and end her marriage to Paul and leaves town with him. Rosanna accomplishes the former task before informing a heartbroken Paul that she hates him. Months later, she resurfaces in Bangkok, Thailand only to bump into Craig. Though he assures her he will help her escape, she realizes that she will never be free under Stenbeck's thumb and makes the decision to give Cabot up for adoption in order to ensure his safety.

Upon her return to Oakdale, Rosanna attempts to reconcile with Paul after telling him her ordeal. Hurt that she chose to turn to Craig for help instead of him, he rejects her. At the same time, Craig is determined to obtain custody of his unborn child with Jennifer Munson and begs Rosanna to remarry him. Weeks earlier, Rosanna had met a pregnant teenager, Gwen Norbeck. Feeling sorry for her plight and wanting a family, she arranged for the adoption of Gwen's child. Craig is vehemently against the adoption but Rosanna defies his wishes and goes ahead with the process. In a strange turn of events, Jennifer and Gwen both went into premature labor at the same time. Jennifer's baby seemingly died in the hospital and when Craig does not show any signs of grief, Rosanna becomes suspicious, taking into account his tireless efforts to gain custody of his son before his death. She becomes even more confused when Craig immediately takes to their adopted child. When she realizes that Craig must have switched the babies, Rosanna confronts him. He confesses to his crime and Rosanna, horrified, rushes out to tell the police. Craig, who was tailing her, continually hit the side of her car trying to get her to pull over but this causes her to crash as she was on the phone with Paul, begging for help. Before she loses consciousness, she tells him, "Wrong foot" before slipping into a coma. Craig is subsequently sent to jail for attempted murder and the baby is placed in Carly's custody, who sends a comatose Rosanna to a private clinic in Switzerland.

=== 2007–08 ===
In July 2007, Paul is in a coma after he fell from cliff during a fight with Craig, and he is brought to the same clinic as Rosanna. In his coma, he meets Rosanna at the place between life and death. Paul wakes up, asking for Rosanna. He goes to her bed, pleading her to wake up. After he leaves, she wakes up, smiling and saying his name. Paul promises that they will punish Craig for what he has done to her. A few weeks later, Craig receives a call from the clinic with the news that Rosanna has woken up and left the clinic, leaving him frightened.

Craig tries to get into the good graces of Rosanna, but she is not interested. All she wants to do is be with Paul and get back at Craig for what he had done to her. Rosanna soon learns about the on-off relationship between Paul and Meg. She sees Meg as a threat, but when Paul marries her on Halloween 2007, Rosanna is relieved and believes nothing can come between her and Paul anymore. However, Rosanna notices that Paul is still in love with Meg, so she meets with Craig and demands him to get Meg pregnant. Craig and Rosanna were happy when Meg becomes pregnant until Rosanna learned that Megs baby wasn't Craig's, but Paul's. Rosanna switches the result of the paternity tests. Meg and Craig hear that Craig was the father and once again, Rosanna feels safe now that Meg is bonded to Craig. Craig finds out the truth and discovers that Meg had cheated on him and the baby is Paul's. Craig looks for medication that will cause a miscarriage for Meg. Rosanna then slips back into her coma.

=== 2009–10 ===
Rosanna appears again in May 2009 and is discovered by Paul. She reveals that after she woke up from her coma, she discovered that her assets had been wiped out, as Cabot Motors had failed during the recession, and the remainder of her assets were placed in a Ponzi scheme. She then moved to a co-op farm in the Midwest and worked there to make ends meet. She agrees to return to Oakdale if Paul accompanies her. Rosanna later reunites with Carly and is introduced to the relationship between Carly and Craig. Though originally against it, she agrees to be Carly's maid of honor before Carly goes missing and ends up in the hospital. Rosanna realizes that Carly is an alcoholic after finding several hidden bottles of alcohol at Milltown. Along with Craig, Parker, Jack and Janet, the group hold an intervention, hoping to persuade Carly to go to rehab. After Carly agrees, Rosanna promises that she will live at Carly's home and assist with household duties, while helping Craig run the vitamin water company he and Carly own. After continuing bickering between each other, Rosanna and Craig rekindle their romance behind Carly's back. When Carly returns from rehab in November, she catches Craig in an embrace with Rosanna and the two confess to an affair. Carly throws Rosanna out of her house and breaks off her engagement to Craig. Rosanna and Craig continued their relationship and plan to marry, but witnessing first-hand that Craig still has feelings for Carly and vice versa, Rosanna leaves Craig at the altar and leaves town for Germany. After hearing that Craig did not intend to run her off the road and that it was merely at the thought of losing Johnny, she confesses to Carly that she's been set free from Craig and their past.

Rosanna returns to Oakdale in September 2010 for Jack and Carly's third wedding. She quickly brings the woes of her personal life with her to the wedding and comes to blows with Craig after meeting his son, Gabriel. Rosanna reconciles with Craig and decides to help him co-parent Johnny.

== Reception ==
Hollie Deese put the recasting of Rosanna on her list of the best soap opera recasts, commenting that when McClain "stepped into the role of Rosanna after originator Yvonne Perry, she quickly earned a following and won a Daytime Emmy in 2004 for Outstanding Supporting Actress." Garren Waldo from SoapHub described the character as "devilish".
