= Katie Peretti =

- As the World Turns character
- Terri Conn as Katie Peretti Snyder
- Portrayed by: Cori Anne Hansen (1989–94); Terri Conn (1998–2010)
- Duration: 1989–94; 1998–2010
- First appearance: February 22, 1989
- Last appearance: September 17, 2010
- Created by: Douglas Marland
In-universe information
- Other names: Kathryn Ann Peretti; Katie Frasier; Katie Coleman; Katie Kasnoff; Katie Snyder (2007–)
- Occupation: Talk show host; Author
- Parents: Casey Peretti; Lyla Crawford
- Siblings: Margo Montgomery Hughes; Cricket Montgomery Ross; Craig Montgomery
- Spouse: Simon Frasier (2000–2004); Henry Coleman (2005); Mike Kasnoff (2006-07); Jack Snyder (2007); Brad Snyder (2008–09)
- Children: Jacob Snyder
- Grandparents: Joe Peretti; Maureen Peretti
- Aunts and uncles: Michael Peretti; Loretta Peretti; Margaret Crawford
- Nieces and nephews: Adam Munson; Casey Hughes; Billy Ross; Suzie Ross; Bryant Montgomery; Lucy Montgomery; Johnny Montgomery
- First cousins: Jill Andropoulos

Katie Peretti is a fictional character on the daytime soap opera As the World Turns. She was portrayed by Terri Conn from August 29, 1998 to September 17, 2010. She was also portrayed by Cori Anne Hansen as a child, from 1989 to 1994. Conn, known as Terri Colombino during the majority of her years on the show, is considered to be one of the most popular young heroines to appear on ATWT in its final decade.

== Casting and characterization ==
Terri Conn joined the cast of the CBS daytime drama ATWT in 1998 but was not the first to appear on the show in the role as Cori Anne Hansen played the part from 1989 to 1994. Conn previously appeared as a model on another CBS soap opera, The Young and the Restless in 1995. The actress' popularity as the young heroine is considered to be one of the last in the final decade of the show. The actress and character's critical acclaim allowed the show to capitalize on the attention with the release of the novel Oakdale Confidential: A Novel, which spanned a series of other books inspired by other CBS and ABC daytime dramas.

At the conclusion of the show in 2010, Conn commented on her favorite storyline which saw her character manage life without her husband, who recently died.

"I definitely felt like the day when Brad died was one [her favorite story] because it was so beautifully written. And that is another thing, too. You have to have the writing and there has to be a great story. The way they wrote it was so beautiful, because he comes back to life for a bit there, and you think he’s going to be all right. And we have this conversation that everything is going to be great, and I go get the baby and while I am gone he dies. He never gets to see the baby. I don’t get to have a goodbye with him, and it’s really something I have not seen done before, and I was so glad about that."

—Terri Conn, Michael Fairman On-Air On-Soaps

Following the end of the show on September 17, 2010, Conn was cast in the role of ABC's One Life to Live as con-artist Aubrey Wentworth and she remained with the show from November 29, 2010 until December 29, 2011. After departing from her role on OLTL, Conn continued to act and appeared in the role of Kerrie on the NBC sitcom 30 Rock in the episode "The Ballad of Kenneth Parcell" on January 26, 2012.

== Character history ==
=== Family and relationships ===
Her relationship with con artist and jewel smuggler Simon Frasier (Paul Leyden) has become one of daytime's most successful modern day couples. Known as "Skatie," the couple was documented In the show-inspired novel Oakdale Confidential: A Novel. Katie said of her relationship with him that "when it came to Simon, I now had calluses upon calluses on my heart to protect me from his powers of persuasion."

Katie (Terri Conn) and Simon (Paul Leyden) were a successful couple on ATWT.

Their marriage and subsequent on-again, off-again relationship came about in between Katie's breakups and divorces with Henry Coleman and Mike Kasnoff and the death of her other great love Brad Snyder, who she shares a son with, Jacob Snyder. Although Henry and Katie's friendship remained strong, Henry's portrayer Trent Dawson said that "Katie loved Henry, but she wasn't in love with him." Katie was also married to Brad's brother Jack Snyder in 2007. The marriage was rushed due to Katie's insecurities and her dislike for his ex-wife Carly Snyder, as well as Jack's own issues. Katie eventually became engaged to former love Chris Hughes by the end of the series. Among Katie's other relationships were her best friends Henry and his ex-fiancee Vienna Hyatt, both of whom became surrogate family to her. Katie's family includes her parents Casey Peretti and Lyla Crawford and maternal half-siblings Margo Montgomery Hughes, her greatest ally throughout all of her tribulations, Cricket Montgomery Ross and Craig Montgomery, who is one of the town's most feared villains.

== Career and Oakdale Confidential ==
Katie primarily worked as the co-host of "Oakdale Now" at local television station WOAK but she is also the author of Oakdale Confidential: A Novel, which was released on April 4, 2006 through publishing company Pocket Books, a division of Simon & Schuster. Katie's name appeared as the fictional author, although the actual book was written by Alina Adams, who also wrote Henry Coleman's novel The Man From Oakdale, which was released in 2009 and Guiding Light-inspired novel Guiding Light: Jonathan's Story, which was released in 2008 with co-author Julia London and centered on the life of popular character Jonathan Randall.

The book follows the investigation into the murder of Gregory Marron, Jr., a longtime supporter of Oakdale Memorial Hospital whose killer can be anyone in town due to his high volume of enemies. With Katie's boyfriend Mike, Maddie Coleman's brother Henry and Carly Snyder's husband Jack being the three main suspects, all three women attempt to conceal any evidence that could imprison the men they love. Re-released as Oakdale Confidential: Secrets Revealed seven months later on November 14, 2006, the book achieved acclaim as it entered The New York Times Bestseller List. Promoted heavily on the show itself, the novel was praised by mystery and crime writer Jeffery Deaver, saying that the publication was "Fast, fun, and filled with sizzling intrigue and gossip galore..."
