= Yvonne Perry =

American actress

Yvonne Perry (born October 23, 1966) is an American actress.

== Early years ==
Born on October 23, 1966, Perry has a BFA in theater from Adelphi University and an MA in Theatre History from the University at Albany.

== Career ==
After years doing commercials, and nearly a year as part of the improv team tricking people for Candid Camera, her big break came in 1992 when she landed the role of Rosanna Cabot on the CBS soap opera As the World Turns. In 1993, she won the Soap Opera Digest award for Outstanding Female Newcomer which was the show's first win in that category. She and on-screen love interest Shawn Christian (ex-Mike) were voted Hottest Soap Opera Couple by People magazine in 1995. In 1996, she left the program but returned in 1998 and 1999.

After leaving As the World Turns, Perry studied in London with the Royal National Theatre, lived in Los Angeles for several years, and now resides in upstate New York with her husband, Mark, whom she married in 1993, and their two daughters. She remains very good friends with former co-stars Martha Byrne (Lily, ex-Rose) and Kelley Menighan Hensley (Emily). She has been a Visiting Guest Artist at Union College in Schenectady, New York and currently teaches at Siena College, Skidmore College, and the State University of New York at Albany.

Perry still enjoys an active career as a freelance actress. She does regional theatre, commercials, voice-overs, audio books, industrial films, and occasional independents. In 2018 Yvonne became an Associate Artist at Capital Repertory Theatre in Albany, NY, where she often performs, directs, and serves on the Next Act New Play Summit selection committee. She also serves as the vice-chair of the Greater Albany Area Liaison for Actors Equity.

She played a divorced mother of a young boy in a half-hour comedy pilot called Dads in 1997.

== Movie roles ==
In 2006, she appeared in the films Ten 'til Noon and UnCivil Liberties. She appeared in two unreleased films, Winter of Frozen Dreams and Love Conquers Paul.
