= Terri Conn =

American actress

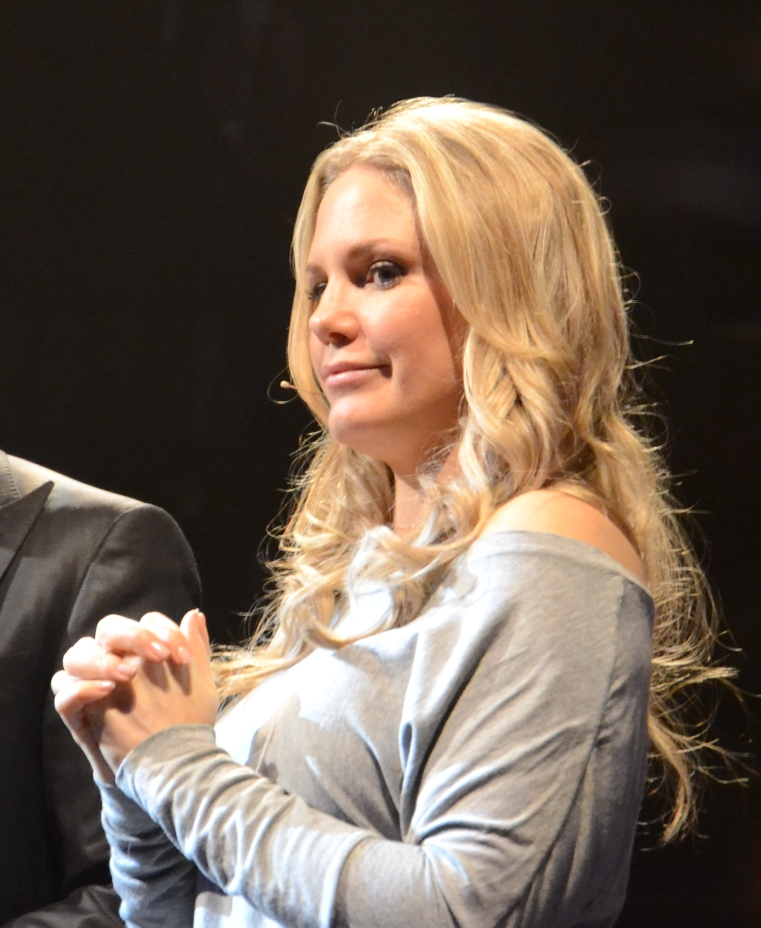
- Conn in 2012
- Born: Bloomington, Indiana
- Years active: 1993–present
- Spouse: Austin Peck (m. 2011)
- Children: 3

Terri Conn is an American actress. She is known for her roles as Katie Peretti on As the World Turns, Christine “Aubrey Wentworth" Karr on One Life to Live, and Ashley Dupree on Breaker High. On July 1, 2011, she married her former As the World Turns co-star, Austin Peck. On December 22, 2018, Conn joined the shopping network QVC as a program host.

== Personal background ==
In June 2010, Conn and her former As the World Turns co-star, Austin Peck officially came out as a couple at the 37th Annual Daytime Emmy Awards. Their relationship was covered in the February 15, 2011 and March 8, 2011 issues of Soap Opera Digest magazine. The February Valentine's Day issue included an interview with Peck, covering his move to One Life to Live, along with his relationship with Conn. The couple were married on July 1, 2011. The couple have two daughters Keira Grace Peck and Morgan Theresa Peck.

== Professional background ==
Conn starred in the 2008 movie, iMurders, in the role of Sandra Wilson. She also appeared on the Canadian teen show Breaker High.

From 1998 to its finale in 2010, Conn portrayed Katie Peretti on CBS' As the World Turns. In December 2010, she joined One Life to Live in the newly created role of Aubrey Wentworth, credited under her maiden name, Terri Conn.

== Filmography ==
=== Film ===
Year	Title	Role	Notes
1994	Kickboxer 4	Eliza	
1994	Hong Kong 97	Woos Bodyguard	
1995	Spitfire	Vicky	
2002	Long Story Short	Tina Hobble	
2008	iMurders	Sandra Wilson	
2010	Once More	Linda Martin	Short film
2012	Couch	Christine	Short film
2019	Play the Flute	Lisa Cobb	Christian film

=== Television ===
Year	Title	Role	Notes
1995	The Young and the Restless	Model	1 episode
1996	ABC Afterschool Special		Episode: "Too Soon for Jeff"
1996	Profiler	Candy Bruckner	Episodes: "Ring of Fire", "Night Dreams"
1997	Brotherly Love	Girl in Music Store	Episode: "Stealing Beauty"
1997	Step by Step	Julie Fleming	Episode: "Show Me the Money"
1997–1998	Breaker High	Ashley Dupree	Main role (44 episodes)
1998	7th Heaven	Charlotte	Episode: "It Takes Two, Baby"
1998–2010	As the World Turns	Katie Peretti Snyder	Main role (1366 episodes)
2003	Law & Order: Criminal Intent	Chantal Fielding	Episode: "Monster"
2010–2011	One Life to Live	Aubrey Wentworth	Main role (106 episodes)
2012	30 Rock	Kerrie	Episode: "The Ballad of Kenneth Parcell"

== See also ==
- Supercouple
