= List of soap opera media outlets =

There are multiple media outlets which focus primarily on television soap operas and telenovelas. These publications and websites feature news, cast and crew interviews, plot summaries and previews, editorials and reviews, TV listings and video previews related to the genre.

List of soap opera media outlets
| Name | Years | Country | Notes |
|---|---|---|---|
| Afternoon TV | 1968–1985 | United States | Monthly print magazine covering daytime soap operas published by Roband Publications. |
| All About Soap | 1999–2016 | United Kingdom | Biweekly print magazine covering primetime soap operas |
| Daily Drama | 2023–present | United States | Website featuring soap opera news, spoilers, recaps, exclusive interviews, and more |
| Daytime Confidential | 2007–present | United States | Website founded in 2007, under the Zap2it network from January 2012 through March 2014 |
| Inside Soap | 1992–present | United Kingdom | Weekly print magazine covering primetime and daytime soap operas |
| Into Soap Magazine (IntoSoap) | 2004 | United Kingdom | Short-lived print publication founded by actor Nicholas Cochrane of Coronation Street |
| Michael Fairman TV | 2008–present | United States | Established in 2008 as On-Air On-Soaps, the website was re-branded as Michael Fairman TV in May 2018. The site features news, interviews, reviews and previews by longtime soap opera journalist Michael Fairman, creator and executive producer of Sony's SoapCity. |
| Serial Scoop | 2013–present | United States | Covers "daytime soap operas, primetime serials, novelas, TV movies, big screen features, web series, theater and every form of serialized entertainment" |
| Soap Opera Digest | 1975–present | United States | Weekly print magazine covering daytime and prime time soap operas; it went to internet-only at the end of 2023. |
| Soap Opera Magazine | 1991–1999 | United States | Weekly print magazine covering daytime soap operas |
| Soap Opera Network | 2001–present | United States | News and features website |
| Soap Opera Update | 1988–2002 | United States | Weekly print magazine covering daytime soap operas |
| Soap Opera Weekly | 1989–2012 | United States | Weekly print magazine covering daytime soap operas |
| Soap Hub | 2014–present | United States | Website featuring soap opera news, spoilers, recaps, exclusive interviews, and more |
| Soap Central | 1995–present | United States | Soap opera news and feature hub, originally a fansite known as The AMC Pages and later Soap Opera Central. As of 2024, owned by Nazara Technologies |
| SoapCities | 2017–present | United States | Soap opera news blog founded by Shawn Brady and Akbi Khan in 2017. The site provides news and interviews. |
| SoapCity | 1999–20?? | United States | Sony Pictures' now-defunct official website for the American daytime soap operas Days of Our Lives and The Young and the Restless, created and executive produced by longtime soap opera journalist Michael Fairman |
| Soaplife | 1999–2018 | United Kingdom | Biweekly (weekly in 2018) print magazine covering primetime soap operas |
| ABC Soaps In Depth | 1997–2020 | United States | Trio of print publications each focusing on the soaps of one of the three primary American networks. As of 2020, all print publications have ceased, although Soaps in Depth continues to operate as a digital-only publication. On May 29, 2025, Soaps In Depth digitally merged with Soap Opera Digest, as part of the A360media branding. |
| CBS Soaps In Depth | 1997–2020 | United States | Trio of print publications each focusing on the soaps of one of the three primary American networks. As of 2020, all print publications have ceased, although Soaps in Depth continues to operate as a digital-only publication. On May 29, 2025, Soaps In Depth digitally merged with Soap Opera Digest, as part of the A360media branding. |
| NBC Soaps In Depth | 1997–1999 | United States | Trio of print publications each focusing on the soaps of one of the three primary American networks. As of 2020, all print publications have ceased, although Soaps in Depth continues to operate as a digital-only publication. On May 29, 2025, Soaps In Depth digitally merged with Soap Opera Digest, as part of the A360media branding. |
| Soaps She Knows (Soaps.com) | 2006–present | United States | Owned by SHE Media, the website was founded in June 2006 as Soaps.com, in January 2010 the site was mirrored at Soaps.SheKnows.com, and in April 2010 Soaps.com became a redirect to the new location. |
| Thatsup | 2015–present | Canada | Established in 2016, covers American soap operas. |
| TVMEG.COM | 2000–present | United States | Established in 2000 as The TV MegaSite, Inc., the website was re-branded in 2018 as TVMEG.COM. The site, run by Suzanne Lanoue, focuses on television, especially daytime soaps. It's linked to the old site, The TV MegaSite, which has daily transcripts, recaps etc. going back to the 90's. They have many interview with TV actors and more. Hundreds of volunteers have written for the site over the years. |
| TVSource Magazine | 2008–present | United States | Established in 2008 as Soap Opera Source, the website was re-branded in 2012 as TVSource Magazine. The site focuses on the entertainment industry, television and pop culture. |
| TVyNovelas | 1982–present | Mexico | Print magazine and Televisa house publication covering telenovelas, with international editions in the US, Argentina, Chile and Colombia, and annual awards called the Premios TVyNovelas |
| We Love Soaps | 2007–present | United States | Founded by Roger Newcomb in 2007, We Love Soaps is a leading voice in the recognition and advancement of serialized storytelling across television and digital media. It's an essential hub for industry insight, archival history, and cultural commentary. |
