= Carly Snyder =

- As the World Turns character
- Portrayed by: Maura West
- Duration: 1995–2010
- First appearance: April 11, 1995
- Last appearance: September 17, 2010
- Created by: Richard Culliton
- Introduced by: Laurence Caso (1995); Felicia Minei Behr (1997)
In-universe information
- Other names: Carly Lowe; Carly Munson; Carly Dixon; Carly Snyder
- Occupation: Businesswoman; Nightclub owner; Fashion designer; Interior decorator; Waitress; Ladies room attendant; Secretary
- Parents: Ray Tenney; Sheila Washburn
- Half-sisters: Rosanna Cabot; Gwen Norbeck
- Husband: Winston Lowe (backstory); Hal Munson (1998); John Dixon (1998–1999); Brad Snyder (1999); Jack Snyder (2002–2006, 2010–present)
- Children: Nora Kasnoff; Parker Snyder; Sage Snyder; Unknown Child
- Adoptive children: J.J. Snyder
- Aunts and uncles: Lee Washburn
- Nieces and nephews: Billy Norbeck; Hallie Munson
- First cousins: Molly Conlan
- Other relatives: Abigail Williams

Carly Tenney Snyder is a fictional character from the CBS soap opera As the World Turns. The character was originated in 1995 by actress Maura West, who appeared from April 11, 1995, to May 8, 1996, and from September 11, 1997, until the series finale on September 17, 2010.

The character's history on the show has mostly revolved around her multiple relationships and children; most notably being half of a supercouple duo on As the World Turns with Jack Snyder (Michael Park).

== Storylines ==
=== 1995–96 ===
Carly Tenney is the daughter of Ray Tenney and Sheila Washburn. Carly originally comes to town in search of her "cousin" Rosanna Cabot and the Cabot fortune. When Carly was little, Sheila abandoned her, married Alexander Cabot and gave birth to Rosanna. Ray married Sheila's sister, Lee, who raised Carly as her own daughter.

Carly had a one-night stand with a man she met in a bar soon after arriving in town, whom she later learns is Mike Kasnoff, Rosanna's fiancé. Carly tries everything she could to destroy their relationship. After Mike and Rosanna's wedding is called off, he and Carly sleep together again and she becomes pregnant. Mike and Rosanna reconcile but Carly uses the pregnancy to get closer to Mike. Rosanna becomes jealous of Carly and offers to buy Carly's baby. Carly at first refuses but later uses the offer in another attempt to end Mike and Rosanna's relationship. During a confrontation with Rosanna, Carly falls and goes into premature labor. Her baby is stillborn, who she calls Nora. Carly then leaves to go to Hong Kong.

=== 1997–2010 ===
Once she was back in Oakdale, Carly met Brad Snyder. She fell in love with Brad's brother, Jack. Her sister Rosanna agreed to provide Carly's child with a 50 million dollar trust fund if she would have the baby with a man to whom she was married (who was not Mike). Growing impatient, she later gave Carly a deadline: midnight the end of 1998. Unfortunately for Carly, the deadline was given in the late winter of 1998, giving her little time to get pregnant. She wanted to have Jack's baby, but he was injured in the line of duty and could not have sex. Deciding that the money was more important than her love for Jack (or feeling she could get him back later), she seduced Hal Munson. After they married, she was unsure whether she was pregnant, so as the end of March neared, Carly got desperate and enlisted John Dixon to inseminate her. In the meantime, Carly continued to pine for Jack, and Hal sensed this, leading to their divorce. Soon after, she found that her due date was in January, indicating that John was the likely father and not Hal. So she quickly married John so fulfill Rosanna's terms. As 1999 loomed, Carly decided to induce labor early to ensure her trust fund, but John refused to risk the baby's safety since the plan was for him to raise the child when it was born. However, when Carly felt a contraction in her 8th month, she had a change of heart and decided that she was keeping this child, money or no money. Not long after, fate intervened and miraculously, Jack delivered Carly's baby boy on New Year's Eve—30 seconds before the deadline. John named the baby Parker after his mother's maiden name.

After this, she became fairly depressed. She had lost Jack to another woman and couldn't handle it. She began drinking to help fix her problems. Her son, Parker, and Craig Montgomery were the only ones that notice her problems. After a while she agreed to marry Craig, and he was trying to help her with her problem.

Her sister Rosanna came back to town and Carly and Craig lied to her about her alcoholism problem, as they were planning their wedding. After an intervention staged by her family, Carly finally agreed to go to rehab. Then Carly wrote a letter to Sage. She returns from rehab for Brad's funeral and she reveals she has become sober. She is happy to see Craig but then learns that he and Rosanna are having an affair and they break up. Then Craig and Rosanna planned to marry but she leaves him at the altar after realizing he still has feelings for Carly, and she flees to Germany. When Jack and Janet separate, he and Carly grow close once again and when she learns that Janet slept with Dusty she plots to break them up. On September 15, 2010, Jack and Carly remarry, but while coming home after their wedding, they find Jack's ex-wife, Janet in labor so, Jack and Carly help deliver Janet's child. On September 16, 2010, Carly received news that she was pregnant.

== See also ==
- Jack Snyder and Carly Tenney
