= SoapCity =

Soap opera website

SoapCity is a defunct soap opera website, owned by Sony Pictures Digital. The site was the former home to the official websites for two soap operas produced by Columbia TriStar Television, (now Sony Pictures Television) NBC's Days of Our Lives and CBS's The Young and the Restless. In addition, Procter & Gamble Productions contracted with SoapCity to handle the web presence for their two CBS series, As the World Turns and Guiding Light.

When announced in 1999, SoapCity was planned to be the online component to a Sony-produced cable channel of the same name, which would air same-day repeats and archives of these same shows. However the channel would never air after being beaten to the market by ABC/Disney's SoapNet, contractual objections by NBC and CBS at the time disallowing re-airs on a network not owned by them, and distribution and programming complications with Sony's Game Show Network which made launching a second channel untenable.

In addition to standard coverage of daytime soap operas, including news stories, catch-up synopses and story analysis, the site was one of the first to allow day-and-day digital downloads of Days and Y&R, along with archived episodes dating back to the series' 1965 and 1973 launches. Eventually the site became a landing page redirecting viewers to the sites of their soap operas on their television networks, though as of 2017, the domain is defunct, but still held by Sony Pictures Television.

SoapCity was created and executive produced by soap opera journalist Michael Fairman.
