= Laurence Caso =

American television producer

Laurence Caso is an American television producer.

== Career ==
Caso was the executive producer of CBS Daytime's As the World Turns from 1988–1995. During the 1988 Writers Guild of America strike, he became the show's head writer.

He won the Editor's Award at the 9th Annual Soap Opera Digest Awards.

In 1995, CBS was widely believed to have engineered the infamous producers musical chairs. With the help of Procter and Gamble Productions, Another World's EP, John Valente, went to ATWT; GL's EP, Jill Farren Phelps, to AW and Michael Laibson took over at GL, leaving ATWT's EP, Laurence Caso the odd man out. He was offered to be a Creative Consultant on ABC Daytime's The City in 1996 but turned it down.

Prior to becoming ATWT's EP in 1988, Caso had been CBS VP for Daytime. His replacement was Lucy Johnson.

== Awards and nominations ==
He has been nominated for 5 Daytime Emmys.
