= Daytime Emmy Award for Outstanding Children's Series =

Former television award

The Daytime Emmy Award for Outstanding Children's Series was an Emmy award given to television programming aimed towards children. Children's television had been recognized at the Emmys since the inaugural year. In 1995, a separate award for pre-school children's television was created, and the two categories had been recognized since then. Starting in 2018, a distinction between children's series and educational series was created, resulting in two separate categories. In November 2021, it was announced that all Daytime Emmy categories honoring children's programming would be retired in favor of a separate Children's & Family Emmy Awards ceremony that was held starting in 2022.

== Winners and Nominees ==
Winners in bold

=== Outstanding Entertainment Children's Series ===
1974

- **Zoom** (PBS)
- Captain Kangaroo (CBS)
- Fat Albert and the Cosby Kids (CBS)
- Star Trek: The Animated Series (NBC)

1975

- **Star Trek: The Animated Series** (NBC)
- Captain Kangaroo (CBS)
- The Pink Panther Show (NBC)

1976

- **Big Blue Marble** (SYN)
- Captain Kangaroo (CBS)
- Fat Albert and the Cosby Kids (CBS)
- Zoom (PBS)

1977

- **Zoom** (PBS)
- Captain Kangaroo (CBS)
- Once Upon a Classic ("David Copperfield") (PBS)
- Once Upon a Classic ("Heidi") (PBS)
- Once Upon a Classic ("The Prince and the Pauper") (PBS)

1978

- **Captain Kangaroo** (CBS)
- Once Upon a Classic ("Robin Hood") (PBS)
- Zoom (PBS)

1979

- **Kids Are People Too** (ABC)
- Captain Kangaroo (CBS)
- Once Upon a Classic ("John Halifax, Gentleman") (PBS)
- Once Upon a Classic ("Lorna Doone") (PBS)
- Once Upon a Classic ("The Secret Garden") (PBS)

1980

- **Hot Hero Sandwich** (NBC)
- Captain Kangaroo (CBS)
- Kids Are People Too (ABC)
- **Once Upon a Classic** ("Leatherstocking Tales") (PBS)

1981

- **Captain Kangaroo** (CBS)
- **Once Upon a Classic** ("A Tale of Two Cities") (PBS)
- ABC Weekend Specials (ABC)
- Once Upon a Classic ("The Legend of King Arthur") (PBS)

1982

- **Captain Kangaroo** (CBS)
- ABC Weekend Specials (ABC)

1983

- **Smurfs** (NBC)
- **Captain Kangaroo** (CBS)

1984

- **Captain Kangaroo** (CBS)
- **Smurfs** (NBC)

=== Outstanding Children's Instructional Programming ===
1976

- **Schoolhouse Rock!** ("Grammar Rock") (ABC)
- Mister Rogers' Neighborhood (PBS)
- Sesame Street (PBS)

1977

- **Sesame Street** (PBS)
- Villa Alegre (PBS)

1978

- **Schoolhouse Rock!** (ABC)
- Sesame Street (PBS)

1979

- **Schoolhouse Rock!** ("Science Rock") (ABC)
- Dear Alex and Annie (ABC)
- The Metric Marvels (NBC)
- Sesame Street (PBS)

=== Outstanding Informational Children's Series ===
1976

- **Go** (NBC)
- The Electric Company (PBS)
- Make a Wish (ABC)

1977

- **The Electric Company** (PBS)
- ABC Minute Magazine (ABC)
- Animals, Animals, Animals (ABC)
- Schoolhouse Rock! (ABC)

1978

- **Animals, Animals, Animals** (ABC)
- ABC Minute Magazine (ABC)
- Villa Alegre (PBS)

1979

- **Big Blue Marble** (SYN)
- ABC Minute Magazine (ABC)
- 30 Minutes (CBS)
- Animals, Animals, Animals (ABC)
- In the News (CBS)
- NBC Special Treat ("When You Turn Off The Set, Turn On A Book") (NBC)

=== Outstanding Children's Informational/Instructional Series ===
1980

- **Sesame Street** (PBS)
- **30 Minutes** (CBS)
- Mister Rogers' Neighborhood (PBS)

1981

- **30 Minutes** (CBS)
- Animals, Animals, Animals (ABC)
- Kids Are People Too (ABC)
- Sesame Street (PBS)

1982

- **30 Minutes** (CBS)
- Kids Are People Too (ABC)
- Sesame Street (PBS)

1983

- **Sesame Street** (PBS)
- Mister Rogers' Neighborhood (PBS)

1984

- **ABC Weekend Special** (ABC)
- Mister Rogers' Neighborhood (PBS)
- Sesame Street (PBS)

=== Outstanding Children's Informational/Instructional Programming - Short Form ===
1980

- **Ask NBC News** (NBC)
- **H.E.L.P! - Dr. Henry's Emergency Lessons for People** (ABC)
- **In the News** (CBS)
- **Schoolhouse Rock!** (ABC)
- NBC Special Treat ("When You Turn Off The Set, Turn On A Book") (NBC)

1981

- ABC Nutrition Spots (ABC)
- Ask NBC News (NBC)
- The Doughnuts (ABC)
- In the News (CBS)

1982

- **In the News** (CBS)
- Ask NBC News (NBC)
- Betcha Don't Know (NBC)

1983

- **In the News** (CBS)
- Willie Survive (ABC)

1984

- **Young People's Special** ("Just Another Stupid Kid") (SYN)

=== Outstanding Children's Series ===
1985

- **Sesame Street** (PBS)
- Kidsworld (ABC)
- 3-2-1 Contact (PBS)
- Mister Rogers' Neighborhood (PBS)
- Pryor's Place (CBS)

1986

- **Sesame Street** (PBS)
- 3-2-1 Contact (PBS)
- Mister Rogers' Neighborhood (PBS)

1987

- **Sesame Street** (PBS)
- 3-2-1 Contact (PBS)
- Mister Rogers' Neighborhood (PBS)
- Pee-wee's Playhouse (CBS)

1988

- **Sesame Street** (PBS)
- Pee-wee's Playhouse (CBS)
- Mister Rogers' Neighborhood (PBS)

1989

- **Newton's Apple** (PBS)
- 3-2-1 Contact (PBS)
- Mister Rogers' Neighborhood (PBS)
- Reading Rainbow (PBS)
- Sesame Street (PBS)

1990

- **Reading Rainbow** (PBS)
- Captain Kangaroo (PBS)
- Mister Rogers' Neighborhood (PBS)
- Pee-wee's Playhouse (CBS)
- Sesame Street (PBS)

1991

- **Sesame Street** (PBS)
- Pee-wee's Playhouse (CBS)
- Reading Rainbow (PBS)
- Jim Henson's Mother Goose Stories (Disney Channel)
- Mister Rogers' Neighborhood (PBS)

1992

- **Sesame Street** (PBS)
- Lamb Chop's Play-Along (PBS)
- Mister Rogers' Neighborhood (PBS)
- Reading Rainbow (PBS)
- Where in the World Is Carmen Sandiego? (PBS)

1993

- **Reading Rainbow** (PBS)
- Barney & Friends (PBS)
- Mister Rogers' Neighborhood (PBS)
- Sesame Street (PBS)
- Where in the World Is Carmen Sandiego? (PBS)

1994

- **Sesame Street** (PBS)
- Lamb Chop's Play-Along (PBS)
- Mister Rogers' Neighborhood (PBS)
- Reading Rainbow (PBS)
- Where in the World Is Carmen Sandiego? (PBS)

1995

- **Nick News with Linda Ellerbee** (SYN)
- Where in the World Is Carmen Sandiego? (PBS)
- Reading Rainbow (PBS)
- Bill Nye the Science Guy (PBS)
- Beakman's World (CBS)

1996

- **Reading Rainbow** (PBS)
- Bill Nye the Science Guy (PBS)
- Nick News with Linda Ellerbee (SYN)
- Really Wild Animals (CBS)
- Where in the World Is Carmen Sandiego? (PBS)

1997

- **Reading Rainbow** (PBS)
- Beakman's World (CBS)
- Bill Nye the Science Guy (PBS)
- Nick News with Linda Ellerbee (Nickelodeon)
- Where in Time Is Carmen Sandiego? (PBS)

1998

- **Reading Rainbow** (PBS)
- Beakman's World (CBS)
- Bill Nye the Science Guy (SYN)
- Nick News with Linda Ellerbee (SYN)
- Where in Time Is Carmen Sandiego? (PBS)

1999

- **Bill Nye the Science Guy** (SYN)
- Animal Show (FOX)
- Nick News with Linda Ellerbee (SYN)
- Reading Rainbow (PBS)

2000

- **Bill Nye the Science Guy** (SYN)
- The Crocodile Hunter (Animal Planet)
- Nick News with Linda Ellerbee (SYN)
- Saved by the Bell: The New Class (NBC)
- Zoom (PBS)

2001

- **Reading Rainbow** (PBS)
- Between the Lions (PBS)
- Even Stevens (Disney Channel)
- Real Kids, Real Adventures (Discovery Channel)
- Zoom (PBS)

2002

- **Reading Rainbow** (PBS)
- Between the Lions (PBS)
- Discovery Kids Ultimate Guide to the Awesome (Discovery Kids)
- Even Stevens (Disney Channel)
- Zoom (PBS)

2003

- **Reading Rainbow** (PBS)
- Assignment Discovery (Discovery Channel)
- Between the Lions (PBS)
- Even Stevens (Disney Channel)
- Zoom (PBS)

2004

- **Assignment Discovery** (Discovery Channel)
- Jeff Corwin Unleashed (NBC)
- Between the Lions (PBS)
- Operation Junkyard (NBC)
- Scout's Safari (NBC)
- Zoom (PBS)

2005

- **Reading Rainbow** (PBS)
- Jeff Corwin Unleashed (NBC)
- Endurance (NBC)
- Postcards from Buster (PBS)
- Zoom (PBS)

2006

- **Zoom** (PBS)
- Endurance (NBC)
- Between the Lions (PBS)
- Postcards from Buster (PBS)
- Strange Days at Blake Holsey High (NBC)

2007

- **Reading Rainbow** (PBS)
- Assignment Discovery (Discovery Channel)
- Strange Days at Blake Holsey High (NBC)
- Endurance (NBC)

2008

- **Greatest Inventions with Bill Nye** (Discovery Channel)
- **Jack Hanna's Into the Wild** (SYN)
- Design Squad (PBS)
- Postcards from Buster (PBS)

2009

- **From the Top at Carnegie Hall** (PBS)
- Adventure Camp (Discovery Kids)
- FETCH! with Ruff Ruffman (PBS)
- Postcards from Buster (PBS)

2010

- **The Electric Company** (PBS)
- Design Squad (PBS)
- FETCH! with Ruff Ruffman (PBS)

2011

- **The Electric Company** (PBS)
- FETCH! with Ruff Ruffman (PBS)
- Jack Hanna's Into the Wild (SYN)
- SciGirls (PBS)

2012

- **The Electric Company** (PBS)
- **Jack Hanna's Into the Wild** (SYN)
- Biz Kid$ (PBS)
- Born to Explore with Richard Wiese (ABC)
- Everyday Health (ABC)

2013

- **R. L. Stine's The Haunting Hour** (The Hub)
- The Aquabats! Super Show! (The Hub)
- Everyday Health (ABC)

2014

- **R. L. Stine's The Haunting Hour** (The Hub)
- Animal Science (SYN)
- Game Changers with Kevin Frazier (CBS)
- Sea Rescue (ABC)

2015

- **R. L. Stine's The Haunting Hour** (Discovery Family)
- Made in Hollywood: Teen Edition (SYN)
- Odd Squad (PBS)
- Spooksville (Discovery Family)
- The Wildlife Docs (SYN)

2016

- **Sea Rescue** (SYN)
- Annedroids (Amazon)
- Odd Squad (PBS)
- Project Mc2 (Netflix)
- The Wildlife Docs (SYN)

=== Outstanding Pre-School Children's Series ===
1995

- **Sesame Street** (PBS)
- Lamb Chop's Play-Along (PBS)
- Mister Rogers' Neighborhood (PBS)

1996

- **Sesame Street** (PBS)
- Barney & Friends (PBS)
- Lamb Chop's Play-Along (PBS)
- Mister Rogers' Neighborhood (PBS)

1997

- **Sesame Street** (PBS)
- Mister Rogers' Neighborhood (PBS)

1998

- **Sesame Street** (PBS)
- Bear in the Big Blue House (Disney Channel)
- Blue's Clues (Nickelodeon)
- Mister Rogers' Neighborhood (PBS)

1999

- **Sesame Street** (PBS)
- Blue's Clues (Nickelodeon)
- Mister Rogers' Neighborhood (PBS)
- Teletubbies (PBS)

2000

- **Sesame Street** (PBS)
- Bear in the Big Blue House (Disney Channel)
- Blue's Clues (Nickelodeon)
- Mister Rogers' Neighborhood (PBS)
- Teletubbies (PBS)

2001

- **Sesame Street** (PBS)
- Blue's Clues (Nickelodeon)
- Mister Rogers' Neighborhood (PBS)

2002

- **Sesame Street** (PBS)
- Blue's Clues (Nickelodeon)

2003

- **Sesame Street** (PBS)
- Bear in the Big Blue House (Disney Channel)
- Blue's Clues (Nickelodeon)

2004

- **Sesame Street** (PBS)
- Bear in the Big Blue House (Disney Channel)
- Blue's Clues (Nickelodeon)

2005

- **Sesame Street** (PBS)
- Blue's Clues (Nickelodeon)
- Hi-5 (Discovery Kids)

2006

- **Sesame Street** (PBS)
- Blue's Room (Nickelodeon)
- Hi-5 (Discovery Kids)
- The Paz Show (Discovery Kids)

2007

- **Sesame Street** (PBS)
- Hi-5 (Discovery Kids)
- Hip Hop Harry (Discovery Kids)
- It's a Big Big World (PBS)
- The Paz Show (Discovery Kids)

2008

- **Sesame Street** (PBS)
- Between the Lions (PBS)
- Blue's Room (Nickelodeon)
- Jack's Big Music Show (Noggin)
- Super Why! (PBS)

2009

- **Between the Lions** (PBS)
- Johnny and the Sprites (Disney Channel)
- Mama Mirabelle's Home Movies (PBS)
- Sesame Street (PBS)
- Wonder Pets! (Nickelodeon)

2010

- **Sesame Street** (PBS)
- Between the Lions (PBS)
- Wonder Pets! (Nickelodeon)

2011

- **Sesame Street** (PBS)
- Between the Lions (PBS)
- Mickey Mouse Clubhouse (Disney Channel)
- Yo Gabba Gabba! (Nickelodeon)

2012

- **Sesame Street** (PBS)
- 3rd & Bird (Disney Channel)
- Super Why! (PBS)
- Wonder Pets! (Nickelodeon)
- Yo Gabba Gabba! (Nickelodeon)

2013

- **Sesame Street** (PBS)
- The Fresh Beat Band (Nickelodeon)
- Pajanimals (NBC)

2014

- **Sesame Street** (PBS)
- Dino Dan (Nickelodeon)
- The Fresh Beat Band (Nickelodeon)
- Yo Gabba Gabba! (Nickelodeon)

2015

- **Dino Dan: Trek's Adventures** (Nickelodeon)
- Sesame Street (PBS)
- Yo Gabba Gabba! (Nickelodeon)

2016

- **Sesame Street** (PBS)
- Dino Dan: Trek's Adventures (Nickelodeon)
- Mutt & Stuff (Nickelodeon)
- Sunny Side Up (Sprout)

2017

- **Sesame Street** (HBO)
- Bookaboo (Amazon)
- Dino Dan: Trek's Adventures (Nickelodeon)
- Mutt & Stuff (Nickelodeon)
- Sunny Side Up (Sprout)

2018

- **Sesame Street** (HBO)
- Dino Dana (Amazon)
- Julie's Greenroom (Netflix)
- Sprout House (Universal Kids)

2019

- **Sesame Street** (HBO)
- The Big Fun Crafty Show (Universal Kids)
- Dino Dana (Amazon)
- Miss Persona (YouTube.com)
- Snug's House (Universal Kids)

2020

- **Sesame Street** (HBO)

=== Outstanding Children's or Family Viewing Series ===
2017

- **Give** (NBC)
- Annedroids (Amazon)
- Odd Squad (PBS)
- This Just In (POP TV)
- Xploration DIY Sci (SYN)

2018

- **Free Rein** (Netflix)
- Annedroids (Amazon)
- Odd Squad (PBS)
- Top Chef Junior (Universal Kids)
- Nat Geo Kids Block (Nat Geo)

2019

- **Odd Squad** (PBS)
- American Ninja Warrior Junior (Universal Kids)
- Chicken Soup for The Soul's Hidden Heroes (The CW)
- Top Chef Junior (Universal Kids)
- The Who Was? Show (Netflix)

=== Outstanding Education or Informational Series ===
2018

- **Giver** (ION Television)
- Mind Field (YouTube RED)
- Sea Rescue (SYN)
- The Henry Ford’s Innovation Nation (CBS)
- Xploration DIY Sci (SYN)
- Xploration Outer Space (SYN)

2019

- **Weird but True!** (National Geographic Kids)

== Multiple wins ==
33 wins

- Sesame Street

10 wins

- Reading Rainbow

5 wins

- Captain Kangaroo

3 wins

- 30 Minutes
- R. L. Stine's The Haunting Hour
- Schoolhouse Rock!
- The Electric Company

2 wins

- The Big Blue Marble
- Bill Nye the Science Guy
- Jack Hanna's Into the Wild
- The Smurfs
- Zoom

== Multiple nominations ==
41 nominations

- Sesame Street

21 nominations

- Mister Rogers' Neighborhood

16 nominations

- Reading Rainbow

12 nominations

- Captain Kangaroo

9 nominations

- Between the Lions
- Once Upon a Classic

8 nominations

- Blue's Clues

7 nominations

- Where in the World Is Carmen Sandiego?
- Zoom

6 nominations

- Bill Nye the Science Guy
- Nick News with Linda Ellerbee

5 nominations

- Yo Gabba Gabba!
- Odd Squad

4 nominations

- Animals, Animals, Animals
- Bear in the Big Blue House
- Kids Are People Too
- Lamb Chop's Play-Along
- Pee-wee's Playhouse
- Postcards from Buster
- Schoolhouse Rock!
- 30 Minutes
- 3-2-1 Contact
- Zoom

3 nominations

- Wonder Pets!
- ABC Minute Magazine
- ABC Weekend Specials
- Assignment Discovery
- Beakman's World
- The Electric Company
- Endurance
- Even Stevens
- FETCH! with Ruff Ruffman
- Hi-5
- Jack Hanna's Into the Wild
- R.L. Stine's The Haunting Hour

2 nominations

- Animal Show
- Barney & Friends
- The Big Blue Marble
- Blue's Room
- Design Squad
- Dino Dan: Trek's Adventures
- The Electric Company
- Everyday Health
- Fat Albert and the Cosby Kids
- The Fresh Beat Band
- Jeff Corwin Unleashed
- The Paz Show
- The Smurfs
- Star Trek: The Animated Series
- Strange Days at Blake Holsey High
- Super Why!
- Teletubbies
- Villa Alegre
- The Wildlife Docs
