= 28th Daytime Emmy Awards =

- Date: May 18, 2001 (Ceremony); May 12 (Creative Arts Awards)
- Location: Radio City Music Hall, New York City
- Presented by: National Academy of Television Arts and Sciences
- Hosted by: Kathie Lee Gifford

Highlights
- Outstanding Drama Series: As the World Turns
- Outstanding Game Show: Who Wants to Be a Millionaire

Television/radio coverage
- Network: NBC

The 28th Daytime Emmy Awards were held in 2001 to commemorate excellence in daytime programming from the previous year (2000). As the World Turns tied with General Hospital for the most Daytime Emmys won in a single year, with a total of eight.

Winners in each category are in bold.

== Outstanding Drama Series ==
- All My Children
- **As the World Turns**
- General Hospital
- The Young and the Restless

== Outstanding Actor in a Drama Series ==
- Peter Bergman (Jack Abbott, The Young and the Restless)
- **David Canary** (Adam Chandler & Stuart Chandler, All My Children)
- Tom Eplin (Jake McKinnon, As the World Turns)
- Jon Hensley (Holden Snyder, As the World Turns)
- John McCook (Eric Forrester, The Bold and the Beautiful)

== Outstanding Actress in a Drama Series ==
- Julia Barr (Brooke English, All My Children)
- **Martha Byrne** (Lily Snyder & Rose D'Angelo, As the World Turns)
- Susan Flannery (Stephanie Forrester, The Bold and the Beautiful)
- Susan Lucci (Erica Kane, All My Children)
- Marcy Walker (Liza Colby, All My Children)

== Outstanding Supporting Actor in a Drama Series ==
- Hunt Block (Craig Montgomery, As the World Turns)
- Josh Duhamel (Leo du Pres, All My Children)
- Benjamin Hendrickson (Hal Munson, As the World Turns)
- **Michael E. Knight** (Tad Martin, All My Children)
- Michael Park (Jack Snyder, As the World Turns)

== Outstanding Supporting Actress in a Drama Series ==
- Rebecca Budig (Greenlee Smythe, All My Children)
- **Lesli Kay** (Molly Conlan, As the World Turns)
- Cady McClain (Dixie Cooney, All My Children)
- Colleen Zenk Pinter (Barbara Ryan, As the World Turns)
- Maura West (Carly Snyder, As the World Turns)

== Outstanding Younger Actor in a Drama Series ==
- Josh Ryan Evans (Timmy Lenox, Passions)
- David Lago (Raul Guittierez, The Young and the Restless)
- Jesse McCartney (JR Chandler, All My Children)
- Paul Taylor (Isaac Jenkins, As the World Turns)
- David Tom (Billy Abbott, The Young and the Restless)
- **Justin Torkildsen** (Rick Forrester, The Bold and the Beautiful)

== Outstanding Younger Actress in a Drama Series ==
- Terri Colombino (Katie Peretti, As the World Turns)
- **Adrienne Frantz** (Amber Moore, The Bold and the Beautiful)
- Annie Parisse (Julia Lindsey, As the World Turns)
- Eden Riegel (Bianca Montgomery, All My Children)
- Kristina Sisco (Abigail Williams, As the World Turns)

== Outstanding Drama Series Writing Team ==
- All My Children
- **As the World Turns**
- Passions
- The Young and the Restless

== Outstanding Drama Series Directing Team ==
- All My Children
- As the World Turns
- General Hospital
- Passions
- **The Young and the Restless**

== Outstanding Talk Show ==
- Donny & Marie
- Live with Regis
- The Montel Williams Show
- **The Rosie O'Donnell Show**
- The View

== Outstanding Talk Show Host ==
- **Rosie O'Donnell The Rosie O'Donnell Show**
- **Regis Philbin Live With Regis**
- Barbara Walters, Meredith Vieira, Star Jones, Joy Behar and Lisa Ling, The View
- Donny Osmond and Marie Osmond, Donny & Marie

== Outstanding Game/Audience Participation Show ==
- Hollywood Squares
- Jeopardy!
- The Price Is Right
- Win Ben Stein's Money
- **Who Wants to Be a Millionaire**

== Outstanding Game Show Host ==
- Bob Barker, The Price Is Right
- Tom Bergeron, Hollywood Squares
- **Regis Philbin, Who Wants to Be a Millionaire**
- Ben Stein and Jimmy Kimmel, Win Ben Stein's Money
- Alex Trebek, Jeopardy!

== Outstanding Performer in an Animated Program ==
- **Nathan Lane (Spot Helperman/Scott Leadready II, Teacher's Pet)**
- Kel Mitchell (T-Bone, Clifford the Big Red Dog)
- John Ritter (Clifford, Clifford the Big Red Dog)
- Cree Summer (Cleo, Clifford the Big Red Dog)
- Ruby Dee (Alice the Great, Little Bill)

== Outstanding Special Class Animated Program ==
- **Paul Dini, James Tucker, Andrea Romano, Butch Lukic, Hilary Bader, Jean MacCurdy, Stan Berkowitz, Alan Burnett, Dan Riba, Bruce W. Timm, Curt Geda, Bob Goodman, Glen Murakami and Rich Fogel (Batman Beyond)**
- Neil Court, Steven DeNure, Joanna Ferrone, Sue Rose, Beth Stevenson, Holly Huckins, Laura McCreary, Michael Kramer, Aaron Linton, Doug Masters, Kyle Menzies and Vamberto Maduro (Angela Anaconda)
- Mark McCorkle, Robert Schooley, Tad Stones, Don MacKinnon, Steve Loter, Victor Cook and Jamie Thomason (Buzz Lightyear of Star Command)
- Richard Raynis, Paul Verhoeven, Jeff Kline, Audu Paden, Susan Blu, Vincent Edwards, David Hartman, Sean Song, Marsha F. Griffin, Thomas Pugsley, Greg Weisman and Greg Klein (Roughnecks: Starship Troopers Chronicles)
- Andy Heyward, Robby London, Michael Maliani, Elizabeth Partyka, Judith Reilly, Phil Harnage, Sandy Ross and Paul Quinn (Sherlock Holmes in the 22nd Century)

== Outstanding Music Direction and Composition ==
- **Shirley Walker, Lolita Ritmanis, Michael McCuistion and Kristopher Carter (Batman Beyond)**
- Paul Jacobs, Christopher Cerf, Sarah Durkee and Thomas Z. Shepard (Between the Lions)
- John McDaniel (The Rosie O'Donnell Show)
- Mike Renzi, Danny Epstein, Dave Conner, Christopher Cerf and Stephen Lawrence (Sesame Street)

== Outstanding Sound Mixing ==
- **Clancy Livingston, Dean Okrand, Bill Thiederman and Mike Brooks (Honey, I Shrunk the Kids: The TV Show)**
- Susan Pelino (Journey of Dr. Dre)
- Bill Baggett and Robert Montrone (Martha Stewart Living)
- Stephanie Cottrell (Natureworks)
- Christopher Allan and Dan Lesiw (ZOOM)

== Outstanding Sound Editing - Special Class ==
- **Jennifer Mertens, Paca Thomas, Otis Van Osten, Rick Hammel, Eric Hertsguaard, Robbi Smith, Brian F. Mars, Marc S. Perlman and Dominick Certo (Buzz Lightyear of Star Command)**
- Robert Hargreaves, George Brooks, Gregory Beaumont, Mark Keatts, Linda Di Franco, Kelly Ann Foley and Kim Strand (Batman Beyond)
- Robert Schott, Andy Erice, Christopher Fina and Brian Beatrice (Between the Lions)
- Robert Duran and Roshaun Hawley (Jackie Chan Adventures)
- Robert Duran, Robert Poole II and Robbi Smith (Roughnecks: The Starship Troopers Chronicles)
- Robert Hargreaves and Giovanni Moscardino (X-Men: Evolution)
- Rick Hinson and Elizabeth Hinson (Clifford the Big Red Dog)

== Outstanding Sound Mixing - Special Class ==
- **Tom Maydeck and Robert Hargreaves (X-Men: Evolution)**
- Krandal Crews, Eric Freeman, Timothy Borquez, and Timothy J. Garrity (The Angry Beavers)
- Stéphane Bergeron (Arthur Arthur (season 5))
- John Hegedes, Robert Hargreaves and Tom Maydeck (Batman Beyond)
- Blake Norton, Bob Schott and Dick Maitland (Sesame Street)

== Outstanding in Live and Direct to Tape Sound Mixing ==
- **Ron Balentine, David M. Boothe and Gary French (Barney & Friends)**
- **Basil Matychak, Al Theurer, and Keith Carroll (Who Wants to Be a Millionaire)**
- John Sorrento, Ethan Orlovitz, John Venable and Vann Weller (The View)
- Otto Svoboda, Maryann Jorgenson, Hope Vinitsky, Bruce Buehlman and Bob La Masney (Hollywood Squares)
- Ed McEwan, Bill Taylor, Jay Vicari and Marty Brumbach (The Rosie O'Donnell Show)
- Joel Spector, Ed McEwan, Dick Maitland and Ed Greene (Macy's Thanksgiving Day Parade)

== Outstanding Directing in a Children's Series ==
- **Jacques Laberge and Pierre Roy (Zoboomafoo)**
- Koyalee Chanda, Nancy Keegan and Lucy Walker (Blue's Clues)
- Larry Lancit, Ed Wiseman and Kevin Lombard (Reading Rainbow)
- Emily Squires, Ted May and Steve Feldman (Sesame Street)

== Outstanding Children's Series ==
- Even Stevens
- **Reading Rainbow**
- Real Kids, Real Adventures
- Between the Lions
- Zoom

== Outstanding Performer in a Children's Series ==
- **LeVar Burton (Himself, Reading Rainbow)**
- Steve Burns (Steve, Blue's Clues)
- Donna Pescow (Eileen Stevens, Even Stevens)
- Fred Rogers (Himself, Mister Rogers' Neighborhood)
- Kevin Clash (Elmo, Sesame Street)

== Outstanding Children's Special ==
- **Run the Wild Fields: Paul Rauch (executive producer), Paul A. Kaufman (executive producer), Robert A. Halmi (executive producer), Rodney Patrick Vaccaro (co-producer)**
- **A Storm in Summer: Renée Valente (executive producer), Robert A. Halmi (executive producer)**
- Ratz: Cydney Bernard (producer)
- The Sandy Bottom Orchestra: Joseph Maurer (executive producer), Bradley Wigor (executive producer)
- What Matters: 2001 Millennium Special: Dolores Morris (executive producer), Ann Blumenthal Jacobs (producer), Patricia Ryan Lampl (producer), Nina Shelton (coordinating producer)

== Outstanding Performer in a Children's Special ==
- **Ossie Davis (Buck McHenry, Finding Buck McHenry)**
- Ellen Burstyn (Trish, Mermaid)
- Jodelle Ferland (Desi, Mermaid)
- Peter Falk (Abel Shaddick, A Storm in Summer)
- Alfre Woodard (Clara, The Wishing Tree)

== Lifetime achievement award ==
- **Ralph Edwards**
