= Jerry Offsay =

American film and television executive

- Born: The Bronx, New York City, US
- Education: Columbia Law School
- Occupations: Film and television executive, executive producer
- Known for: President of programming for Showtime Networks
- Notable work: The Outer Limits, Soul Food, Queer As Folk, The L Word, Stargate
- Spouse: Pam Offsay

Jerry Offsay is an American film and television executive and executive producer. He served as president of programming for Showtime Networks from 1994 to 2003, when he established Parkchester Pictures, his own production company.

== Early life and education ==
Jerry Offsay grew up in Parkchester, a neighborhood in the Bronx, New York. His father worked at a small display-design company, where his mother was the company bookkeeper. Offsay was the third of four children.

He attended the Bronx High School of Science, State University of New York at Binghamton, and later Columbia Law School, where he earned his J.D. in 1977.

== Career ==
=== Law ===
After graduating from law school, Offsay began his career at the Los Angeles office of Loeb & Loeb. He worked in the firm’s entertainment law practice, finding his specialty in the financing and production of independent films. He was made partner at age 28.

=== Film and television ===
Looking for a change from the law, Offsay joined RKO Pictures as president of production. At RKO, Offsay served as executive producer on several films including Hamburger Hill and Eight Men Out, and co–produced Narrow Margin. In 1990 Offsay became Executive Vice President at ABC Productions, ABC’s newly launched programming company. During his four years at ABC, Offsay supervised the production of the ABCP's programming, including series, miniseries, and movies such as The Commish, and Dominick Dunne's An Inconvenient Woman, and Neil Simon's Broadway Bound.

In January 1994 Offsay began his new role as president of programming at Showtime Networks. He saw an opportunity to bring theater-quality movies to premium television—just as HBO was doing, who at the time released new films monthly. Offsay embarked on a journey to put on an original movie every week. During Offsay's tenure, Showtime more than tripled its original programming, producing and/or commissioning over 300 hundred original films and 20 television series. Over 70 movies were nominated for Emmys; one was nominated for an Oscar. Notable television series Offsay put on the air include Stargate, The Outer Limits, Soul Food, Queer As Folk, The L Word, and Penn and Teller’s Bullshit!, all of which ran five seasons or longer.

In 2003 Offsay left Showtime to start Parkchester Pictures, his own production company, where he produces films and television.

=== Guest Lecturer ===
Offsay has guest lectured at a number of Film, Business and Law Schools, including approximately 20 times at USC and approximately a dozen times at UCLA, where his guest lectures were frequently to combined classes for all 3 schools- he has also guest lectured at AFI, NYU, Columbia, LIU, Southwestern and Cal State Fullerton, amongst other places.

=== Expert Witness ===
Drawing on his legal training and career in entertainment, Offsay has also served as an expert witness on approximately ten trials and arbitrations, such as Sobini Films v. Clear Skies Nevada, and has testified approximately a dozen times on behalf of several major studios, production companies, independent producers and distribution companies.

== Recognition and awards ==
In 2001 Offsay won the Governors Award from the Television Academy for Showtime's diversity programming. That year he was also honored at the ACLU's annual Bill of Rights Awards for introducing topics and issues to the mainstream through Showtime's programming.

In 2002 he was awarded the Lifetime Achievement Award at the Jewish Image Awards in Film and Television. That same year the Professional Organization of Women in Entertainment Reaching Up awarded the Premier Award to Offsay for Showtime's commitment to providing access to quality work that might otherwise go unseen.

In 2003, he was awarded the Executive of the Year Award by the Caucus for Television Producers, Writers, and Directors. During Offsay's tenure at Showtime, the network was awarded six Humanitas Prizes and four Peabody Awards and won eight Daytime Emmy Awards in the Outstanding Children's Special category in seven consecutive years.

== Personal life ==
Offsay and his wife, Pam, supported the development of Offsay Steinhauser Village, a 15-unit L.A. Family Housing affordable housing complex in the Valley Glen neighborhood of Los Angeles. For over 20 years they hosted—originally at Offsay's home but soon expanded to Paramount Studios—an annual "Dessert Party" which raised funds for L.A. Family Housing’s Valley Shelter for the Homeless.

== Programming and film awards ==
Year	Title	Award	Involvement
1995	Outer Limits	CableACE Award for Dramatic Series	Network Programming President
1997	Hiroshima	Humanitas Award, PBS/Cable — with John Hopkins and Toshiro Ishido	Network Programming President
1998	Hiroshima	Gemini Award for Best Dramatic TV Movie or Mini-Series	Network Programming President
1998	The Baby Dance	Peabody Award — with Jane Anderson	Network Programming President
1998	In His Father's Shoes	Daytime Emmy Award for Outstanding Children's Special	Network Programming President
1999	Strange Justice	Peabody Award — with Ernest Dickerson	Network Programming President
1999	The Island on Bird Street	Daytime Emmy Award for Outstanding Children's Special	Network Programming President
2000	Thanks of a Grateful Nation	Humanitas Award, PBS/Cable — with John Sacret Young	Network Programming President
2000	Summer's End	Daytime Emmy Award for Outstanding Children's Special	Network Programming President
2001	Varian's War	Jewish Image Award for Cable Television Film Award	Network Programming President
2001	Things Behind the Sun	Peabody Award — with Allison Anders	Network Programming President
2001	Run the Wild Fields	Daytime Emmy Award for Outstanding Children's Special	Network Programming President
2001	A Storm in Summer	Daytime Emmy Award for Outstanding Children's Special	Network Programming President
2002	Resurrection Blvd.	ALMA Award for Outstanding Television Series	Network Programming President
2002	My Louisiana Sky	Daytime Emmy Award for Outstanding Children's Special	Network Programming President
2003	My Louisiana Sky	Humanitas Award, Children's Live Action — with Anna Sandor	Network Programming President
2003	Bang Bang You're Dead	Daytime Emmy Award for Outstanding Children's Special	Network Programming President
2003	Soul Food	NAACP Image Award for Outstanding Drama Series	Network Programming President
2004	Soul Food	NAACP Image Award for Outstanding Drama Series	Network Programming President
2004	Our America	Humanitas Award, 90 Minutes — with Gordon Rayfield	Network Programming President
2004	The Incredible Mrs. Ritche	Daytime Emmy Award for Outstanding Children's Special	Network Programming President
2005	Edge of America	Peabody Award — with Tim Daly	Network Programming President
2005	Crown Heights	Humanitas Award, Children's Live Action — with Toni Ann Johnson and Michael D'Antonio	Network Programming President
2006	The L Word	GLAAD Media Award for Outstanding Drama Series	Network Programming President
2007	Edge of America	Humanitas Award, Children's Live Action — with Willy Holtzman	Network Programming President
2008	As Seen Through These Eyes	Miami Jewish Film Festival, Winner of Best Documentary	Executive Producer
2008	As Seen Through These Eyes	Los Angeles Jewish Film Festival, Winner of Best Documentary	Executive Producer

== Filmography ==
Year	Title	Role
1987	Hot Pursuit	Executive Producer
1987	Hamburger Hill	Executive Producer
1988	Eight Men Out	Executive Producer
1990	False Identity	Executive Producer
1990	Women and Men: Stories of Seduction	Executive Producer
1990	The Shrimp on the Barbie	Executive Producer
1990	Narrow Margin	Co-Producer
1996	Diabolique	Executive Producer
2003	Baadasssss!	Executive Producer
2004	The Best Thief in the World	Executive Producer
2004	Speak	Executive Producer
2004	Bereft	Executive Producer
2005	Fathers and Sons	Executive Producer
2005	Sexual Life	Executive Producer
2006	Keeping Up with the Steins	Executive Consultant
2008	The Week Reduced	Executive Producer
2008	As Seen Through These Eyes	Executive Producer
2008	Commuter Confidential	Executive Producer
2010	Iris Expanding	Executive Producer
2014	Six Dance Lessons in Six Weeks	Executive Producer
2017	Shot	Executive Producer
2020	Recon	Executive Producer
