= Daytime Emmy Award for Outstanding Writing for a Children's Series =

Television award category

The Daytime Emmy Award for Outstanding Writing for a Children's Series was an Emmy award honoring writing in children's television programming. Since the award's inception, writing in children's series and specials competed in the same category. However, starting in 1985, separate categories were created for series and specials. In November 2021, it was announced that all Daytime Emmy categories honoring children's programming will be retired in favor of a separate Children's & Family Emmy Awards ceremony that will be held starting in 2022.

== Winners and nominees ==
Winners in bold. For "Individual Achievement" categories, only nominees relevant to this page are listed.

=== Outstanding Individual Achievement in Children's Programming ===
==== 1970s ====
1975

- Charles M. Schulz - Be My Valentine, Charlie Brown (CBS)

1978

- **David Wolf** - The Magic Hat (syndicated)
- **Jan Hartman** - ABC Afterschool Special ("Hewitt's Just Different") (ABC)

==== 1980s ====
1980

- **Jan Hartman** - ABC Afterschool Special ("The Late Great Me! Story of a Teenage Alcoholic") (ABC)
- **Team** - Hot Hero Sandwich (NBC)
- Mary Batten - 3-2-1 Contact ("Forces" and "Friday") (PBS)
- John O'Toole - Once Upon a Classic ("Leatherstocking Tales") (PBS)

1981

- **Clare Elfman** - CBS Afternoon Playhouse ("I Think I'm Having a Baby") (CBS)
- **Robert E. Fuisz** - The Body Human ("Facts for Girls") (CBS)
- **Mary Munisteri** - Mandy's Grandmother (syndicated)
- Paul W. Cooper - ABC Afterschool Special ("A Matter of Time") (ABC)
- John Herzfeld - ABC Afterschool Special ("Stoned") (ABC)
- Bob Brush - Captain Kangaroo ("December 26, 1980") (CBS)
- Team - Sesame Street ("#1494") (PBS)

=== Outstanding Writing for Children's Programming ===
==== 1980s ====
1982

- **Paul W. Cooper** - ABC Afterschool Special ("She Drinks a Little") (ABC)
- Robert E. Fuisz - The Body Human ("Becoming a Woman") (CBS)
- Team - Sesame Street ("November 23, 1981") (PBS)

1983

- **Arthur Heinemann** - ABC Afterschool Special ("The Woman Who Willed a Miracle") (ABC)
- Team - Captain Kangaroo (CBS)
- Daryl Warner and Carolyn Miller - ABC Afterschool Special ("Sometimes I Don't Love My Mother") (ABC)
- Team - Sesame Street (PBS)

1984

- **Team** - Sesame Street (PBS)
- Rod Baker and Glen Olson - ABC Weekend Special ("All the Money in the World") (ABC)
- Virginia L. Carter, Fern Field, and Michael McGreevey - ABC Afterschool Special ("The Celebrity and the Arcade Kid") (ABC)

=== Outstanding Writing in a Children's Special ===
==== 1980s ====
1985

- **Charles Purpura** - CBS Schoolbreak Special ("The Day the Senior Class Got Married") (CBS)
- Franklin Thompson (story) and Arthur Heinemann - ABC Afterschool Special ("Backwards: The Riddle of Dyslexia") (ABC)
- Joanna Lee - CBS Schoolbreak Special ("Hear Me Cry") (CBS)

1986

- **Kathryn Montgomery** and **Jeffrey Auerbach** - CBS Schoolbreak Special ("Babies Having Babies") (CBS)
- Jeanne Betancourt - ABC Afterschool Special ("Don't Touch") (ABC)
- Judy Engles - ABC Afterschool Special ("Can a Guy Say No?") (ABC)
- Ann Elder, Cynthia Chenault, Kyle Morris, and Diane Silver - ABC Weekend Specials ("The Adventures of Con Sawyer and Hucklemary Finn") (ABC)
- Alan L. Gansberg and Judith M. Gansberg - CBS Schoolbreak Special ("Have You Tried Talking to Patty?") (CBS)

1987

- **Melvin Van Peebles** - CBS Schoolbreak Special ("The Day They Came to Arrest the Books") (CBS)
- Cynthia A. Cherbak - CBS Schoolbreak Special ("God, the Universe & Hot Fudge Sundaes") (CBS)
- Alan L. Gansberg and Judy Strangis - CBS Schoolbreak Special ("Little Miss Perfect") (CBS)

1988

- **Victoria Hochberg** - ABC Afterschool Special ("Just a Regular Kid: An AIDS Story") (ABC)
- Christopher Whitesell, Susan Rohrer, and John Alan Palmer - ABC Afterschool Special ("Terrible Things My Mother Told Me") (ABC)
- Paul W. Cooper - CBS Schoolbreak Special ("What If I'm Gay?") (CBS)

1989

- **Jeffrey Auerbach** - CBS Schoolbreak Special ("No Means No") (CBS)
- Christopher Whitesell - ABC Afterschool Special ("Daddy Can't Read") (ABC)
- Jeanne Betancourt - ABC Afterschool Special ("Tattle: When to Tell on a Friend") (ABC)
- John Paragon - Pee-wee's Playhouse ("To Tell the Tooth") (CBS)

==== 1990s ====
1990

- **Paul W. Cooper** - CBS Schoolbreak Special ("A Matter of Conscience") (CBS)
- Joanna Lee - CBS Schoolbreak Special ("15 and Getting Straight") (CBS)

1991

- **Courtney Flavin**, **Tracey Thompson**, and **Beth Thompson** - ABC Afterschool Special ("A Question About Sex") (ABC)
- David Wood - Back Home (Disney Channel)
- Dennis Foon, Judith Reeves-Stevens, and Garfield Reeves-Stevens - CBS Schoolbreak Special ("Maddie's Secret") (CBS)
- Josef Anderson - ABC Afterschool Special ("The Perfect Date") (ABC)
- Cynthia A. Cherbak, Elizabeth Hansen, and Herb Stein - CBS Schoolbreak Special ("American Eyes") (CBS)

1992

- **Paul W. Cooper** - CBS Schoolbreak Special ("Abby My Love") (CBS)
- Barbara Nichol - Basil Hears a Noise (PBS)
- Carol Starr Schneider - CBS Schoolbreak Special ("Two Teens and a Baby") (CBS)
- Michael Rubbo - Vincent and Me (Disney Channel)
- Richard Fegen and Andrew Norriss - Woof! (Disney Channel)

1993

- **Bruce Harmon** - Lifestories: Families in Crisis ("Public Law 106: The Becky Bell Story") (HBO)
- Pamela Douglas - CBS Schoolbreak Special ("Different Worlds: A Story of Interracial Love") (CBS)
- Josh Goldstein and Jonathan Prince - CBS Schoolbreak Special ("Words Up!") (CBS)
- Daryl G. Nickens - WonderWorks ("You Must Remember This") (PBS)

1994

- **Amy Dunkleberger** - CBS Schoolbreak Special ("Others Mothers") (CBS)
- Betty G. Birney - CBS Schoolbreak Special ("Big Boys Don't Cry") (CBS)
- Casey Kurtti - ABC Afterschool Special ("The Perfect Date") (ABC)
- Bruce Harmon - Lifestories: Families in Crisis ("More Than Friends: The Coming Out of Heidi Leiter") (HBO)
- Susan Rohrer - CBS Schoolbreak Special ("If I Die Before I Wake") (CBS)

1995

- **Bruce Harmon** - Lifestories: Families in Crisis ("A Child Betrayed: The Calvin Mire Story") (HBO)
- Carol Starr Schneider - CBS Schoolbreak Special ("The Writing on the Wall") (CBS)
- Willy Holtzman - Lifestories: Families in Crisis ("A Body to Die For: The Aaron Henry Story") (HBO)

1996

- **D. Shone Kirkpatrick** - CBS Schoolbreak Special ("Children Remember The Holocaust") (CBS)
- Gina Prince-Bythewood - CBS Schoolbreak Special ("What About Your Friends") (CBS)
- Gordon Rayfield - CBS Schoolbreak Special ("Stand Up") (CBS)
- Pauline Le Bel - The Song Spinner (Showtime)
- Richard Fegen and Andrew Norriss - Woof Returns! A Kid's Best Friend (Disney Channel)

1997

- **Bruce Harmon** - Lifestories: Families in Crisis ("Someone Had to be Benny") (HBO)
- Courtney Flavin - ABC Afterschool Special ("Educating Mom") (ABC)
- Karen Kasaba and Marilyn Reynolds - ABC Afterschool Special ("Too Soon for Jeff") (ABC)
- Tony Geiss and Christine Ferraro - Elmo Saves Christmas (PBS)

1998

- **Bruce Harmon** - The Royale (AMC)
- Gary Gelt - In His Father's Shoes (Showtime)

1999

- **Heather Conkie** - Galileo: On the Shoulders of Giants (HBO)
- John Goldsmith and Tony Grisoni - The Island on Bird Street (Showtime)
- Takashi Bufford - The Tiger Woods Story (Showtime)

==== 2000s ====
2000

- **Robert J. Avrech** - The Devil's Arithmetic (Showtime)
- Robert Munic - In a Class of His Own (Showtime)
- Dalene Young and David A. Simons - Locked in Silence (Showtime)
- Semi Chellas - Restless Spirits (Showtime)
- Wendy Biller and Christopher Hawthorne - Sea People (Showtime)
- Grant Scharbo and Jim Thompson - Summer's End (Showtime)

2001

- **Thom Eberhardt** - Ratz (Showtime)
- Don Wells - Kenny the Shark (Discovery Channel)
- Rodney Patrick Vaccaro - Run the Wild Fields (Showtime)
- Rod Serling - A Storm in Summer (Showtime)
- Grant Scharbo - The Wishing Tree (Showtime)

2002

- **Glenn Gers** - Off Season (Showtime)
- Molly Boylan and Judy Freudberg - Elmo's World ("The Wild Wild West") (PBS)
- Anna Sandor - My Louisiana Sky (Showtime)
- Karen Leigh Hopkins - What Girls Learn (Showtime)

2003

- **William Mastrosimone** - Bang Bang You're Dead (Showtime)
- Gordon Rayfield - Our America (Showtime)

2004

- **Paul Johansson** - The Incredible Mrs. Ritchie (Showtime)
- Kara Lindstrom - A Time for Dancing (Showtime)

=== Outstanding Writing in a Children's Series ===
==== 1980s ====
1985

- **Fred Rogers** - Mister Rogers' Neighborhood (PBS)
- Ozzie Alfonso - 3-2-1 Contact (PBS)
- Franklin Getchel - 3-2-1 Contact (PBS)
- Team - Pryor's Place (CBS)
- Team - Sesame Street (PBS)

1986

- **Team** - Sesame Street (PBS)
- Team - 3-2-1 Contact (PBS)
- Fred Rogers - Mister Rogers' Neighborhood (PBS)

1987

- **Team** - Sesame Street (PBS)
- Fred Rogers - Mister Rogers' Neighborhood (PBS)
- Team - Pee-wee's Playhouse (CBS)

1988

- **Team** - Sesame Street (PBS)
- Team - 3-2-1 Contact (PBS)
- Fred Rogers - Mister Rogers' Neighborhood (PBS)
- Team - Pee-wee's Playhouse (CBS)

1989

- **Team** - Sesame Street (PBS)
- Team - 3-2-1 Contact (PBS)
- Fred Rogers - Mister Rogers' Neighborhood (PBS)
- Jim Thurman and David D. Connell - Square One Television (PBS)

==== 1990s ====
1990

- **Team** - Sesame Street (PBS)
- Fred Rogers - Mister Rogers' Neighborhood (PBS)
- Rob Bragin - Pee-wee's Playhouse ("Heat Wave") (CBS)
- Doug Cox and John Moody - Pee-wee's Playhouse ("Miss Yvonne's Visit") (CBS)
- Jim Thurman and David D. Connell - Square One Television (PBS)

1991

- **Team** - Sesame Street (PBS)
- David Angus - Jim Henson's Mother Goose Stories (Disney Channel)
- John Paragon - Pee-wee's Playhouse ("Camping Out") (CBS)
- Max Robert - Pee-wee's Playhouse ("Fun, Fun, Fun") (CBS)
- Doug Cox and John Moody - Pee-wee's Playhouse ("Conky's Breakdown") (CBS)
- Ronnie Krauss and Andrew Gutelle - Reading Rainbow (PBS)

1992

- **Team** - Sesame Street (PBS)
- Shari Lewis and Bernard Rothman - Lamb Chop's Play-Along (PBS)
- Fred Rogers - Mister Rogers' Neighborhood (PBS)
- Ronnie Krauss and Jill Gluckson - Reading Rainbow (PBS)
- Jim Thurman and David D. Connell - Square One Television (PBS)

1993

- **Team** - Lamb Chop's Play-Along (PBS)
- Stephen White and Mark S. Bernthal - Barney & Friends (PBS)
- Fred Rogers - Mister Rogers' Neighborhood (PBS)
- Team - Reading Rainbow (PBS)
- Team - Sesame Street (PBS)
- Team - Adventures in Wonderland (Disney Channel)

1994

- **Team** - Sesame Street (PBS)
- **Daryl Busby** and **Tom J. Astle** - Adventures in Wonderland (Disney Channel)
- Fred Rogers - Mister Rogers' Neighborhood (PBS)
- Andrew Gutelle and Ronnie Krauss - Reading Rainbow (PBS)
- Team - Lamb Chop's Play-Along (PBS)

1995

- **Team** - Sesame Street (PBS)
- Team - Reading Rainbow (PBS)
- Fred Rogers - Mister Rogers' Neighborhood (PBS)
- Team - Lamb Chop's Play-Along (PBS)
- Team - Beakman's World (CBS)

1996

- **Team** - Bill Nye the Science Guy (syndicated)
- Team - Beakman's World (CBS)
- Team - Lamb Chop's Play-Along (PBS)
- Fred Rogers - Mister Rogers' Neighborhood (PBS)
- Team - Reading Rainbow (PBS)
- Team - Sesame Street (PBS)

1997

- **Team** - Bill Nye the Science Guy (syndicated)
- Team - Beakman's World (CBS)
- Fred Rogers - Mister Rogers' Neighborhood (PBS)
- Lee Hunkins and Ronnie Krauss - Reading Rainbow (PBS)
- Team - Sesame Street (PBS)

1998

- **Team** - Bill Nye the Science Guy (syndicated)
- **Team** - Sesame Street (PBS)
- Fred Rogers - Mister Rogers' Neighborhood (PBS)
- Linda Ellerbee and Walt McGraw - Nick News with Linda Ellerbee (syndicated)
- Team - Reading Rainbow (PBS)

1999

- **Team** - Sesame Street (PBS)
- Team - Blue's Clues (Nickelodeon)
- Team - Bill Nye the Science Guy (syndicated)
- Fred Rogers - Mister Rogers' Neighborhood (PBS)
- Team - Reading Rainbow (PBS)

==== 2000s ====
2000

- **Team** - Bill Nye the Science Guy (syndicated)
- Team - Blue's Clues (Nickelodeon)
- Fred Rogers - Mister Rogers' Neighborhood (PBS)
- Linda Ellerbee and Walt McGraw - Nick News with Linda Ellerbee (syndicated)
- Team - Sesame Street (PBS)

2001

- **Team** - Sesame Street (PBS)
- Team - Between the Lions (PBS)
- Team - Blue's Clues (Nickelodeon)
- Fred Rogers - Mister Rogers' Neighborhood (PBS)
- Team - Reading Rainbow (PBS)

2002

- **Team** - Sesame Street (PBS)
- Team - Blue's Clues (Nickelodeon)
- Fred Rogers - Mister Rogers' Neighborhood (PBS)
- Susan Kim and Jill Gluckson - Reading Rainbow (PBS)

2003

- **Team** - Sesame Street (PBS)
- Team - Between the Lions (PBS)
- Team - Blue's Clues (Nickelodeon)
- Susan Kim and Ronnie Krauss - Reading Rainbow (PBS)

2004

- **Team** - Between the Lions (PBS)
- Team - Bear in the Big Blue House (Disney Channel)
- Adam Peltzman and Jeff Borkin - Blue's Clues (Nickelodeon)
- Team - Sesame Street (PBS)

2005

- **Ronnie Krauss** and **Jill Gluckson** - Reading Rainbow (PBS)
- Adam Peltzman and Jeff Borkin - Blue's Clues (Nickelodeon)
- Team - Postcards from Buster (PBS)
- Team - Sesame Street (PBS)
- Team - Strange Days at Blake Holsey High (NBC)

2006

- **Team** - Sesame Street (PBS)
- Team - Between the Lions (PBS)
- Team - Strange Days at Blake Holsey High (NBC)

2007

- **Ronnie Krauss** - Reading Rainbow (PBS)
- Team - Sesame Street (PBS)

2008

- **Team** - Between the Lions (PBS)
- Glen Berger and Jim Conroy - FETCH! with Ruff Ruffman (PBS)
- Team - Sesame Street (PBS)

2009

- **Team** - Between the Lions (PBS)
- Glen Berger and Jim Conroy - FETCH! with Ruff Ruffman (PBS)
- Team - Sesame Street (PBS)

==== 2010s ====
2010

- **Team** - Sesame Street (PBS)
- Glen Berger and Jim Conroy - FETCH! with Ruff Ruffman (PBS)
- Team - The Electric Company (PBS)

2011

- **Team** - The Electric Company (PBS)
- Team - Sesame Street (PBS)

2012

- **Team** - Sesame Street (PBS)
- Team - 3rd and Bird (Disney Channel)
- Team - The Electric Company (PBS)
- Chris Kratt and Martin Kratt - Wild Kratts (PBS)
- Team - Wonder Pets! (Nickelodeon)

2013

- **Team** - Sesame Street (PBS)
- Chris Kratt and Martin Kratt - Wild Kratts (PBS)
- Team - R.L. Stine's The Haunting Hour (Hub Network)

2014

- **Team** - Sesame Street (PBS)
- Team - The Aquabats! Super Show! (Hub Network)
- Team - R.L. Stine's The Haunting Hour (Hub Network)

2015

- **Team** - Sesame Street (PBS)
- Team - Odd Squad (PBS)
- Team - Spooksville (Discovery Family)

2016

- **Timothy McKeon**, **Charles Johnston**, and **Mark De Angelis** - Odd Squad (PBS)
- J.J. Johnson and Christin Simms - Annedroids (Amazon)
- Aidan Pickering - Sea Rescue (syndicated)
- Team - Sesame Street (PBS)
- Gail Horner - The Inspectors (CBS)

== Outstanding Writing for a Children's, Preschool Children's, Family Viewing Program ==
2017

- Team - Sesame Street (HBO)
- Team - Annedroids (Amazon)
- Lucy Goodman and Andrew Viner - Bookaboo (Amazon)
- Team - Odd Squad (PBS)
- Charlie Engelman - Weird But True! (Nat Geo)

2018

- Team - Sesame Street (HBO)
- Biz Kid$ (PBS)
- Free Rein (Netflix)
- Julie’s Greenroom (Netflix)
- Odd Squad (PBS)

2019

- Timothy McKeon, Mark De Angelis, Adam Peltzman and Robby Hoffman - Odd Squad (PBS)
- Dino Dana (Amazon)
- Odd Squad: World Turned Odd
- Team - Sesame Street (HBO)
- Team - The Who Was? Show (Netflix)

== Outstanding Writing for a Children's or Young Adult Program ==
2020

- Team - Trinkets: Season 1 (Netflix)
- Team - Free Rein (Netflix)
- Team - Ghostwriter (Apple TV+)
- Team - Helpsters (Apple TV+)
- Team - Sesame Street (HBO)

== Programs with multiple awards ==
22 awards

- Sesame Street

7 awards

- CBS Schoolbreak Special

6 awards

- ABC Afterschool Special

4 awards

- Bill Nye the Science Guy

3 awards

- Between the Lions
- Lifestories: Families in Crisis

2 awards

- Reading Rainbow
- Odd Squad
