= Newton Wayland =

American orchestral conductor, arranger, and composer

Newton Hart Wayland
- Born: November 5, 1940; Santa Barbara, California, U.S.
- Died: September 5, 2013 (aged 72); Santa Barbara, California, U.S.
- Education: New England Conservatory of Music
- Occupations: Musician, conductor, composer
- Spouse: Jan Curtis

Newton Hart Wayland (November 5, 1940 – September 5, 2013) was an American orchestral conductor, arranger, composer and keyboardist. The product of an elite musical education, Wayland was known for his dedication to performing for the broadest possible audience.

During a professional musical career that began in 1963, Wayland appeared as a conductor with symphony orchestras across the United States. His programming drew from a background that included Symphonic, Operatic, Chamber Music, Jazz and Musical Comedy. Wayland's symphonic arrangements were performed by the Boston Symphony Orchestra and recorded with the Boston Pops.

In 1978, Wayland was one of a select handful of people in consideration to succeed the longtime Boston Pops Conductor, Arthur Fieldler.

Wayland had a long association with WGBH/PBS television as a musical director and composer for television programs. He composed the “Come on and ZOOM” theme song for the Emmy Award winning children's show, ZOOM.

== Biography ==
Newton Hart Wayland was born to physicians, Helen Hart and L.C. Newton Wayland, in Santa Barbara, CA. He trained as a pianist and, when he was a teenager, formed a jazz combo and chamber group. After graduating from Santa Barbara High School, Wayland attended Harvard University. While at Harvard, he started a jazz band and soon transferred to the New England Conservatory of Music, earning a Bachelor of Music degree in Arranging (1964) and a Masters in Chamber Music (1966). He earned the Chadwick Award for contributions to the Conservatory.

== Conducting ==
Encouraged to try “pops” by Gideon Toeplitz, Wayland found his musical and philosophical niche with popular music orchestras, preferring to perform popular music instead of opera or symphonies because through the popular tunes, he could reach a wider audience.

Arthur Fiedler provided a model for Wayland's own conducting career. “I think his major genius, if you will, was in programming. It's a very delicate line, pops programming, because you're basically dealing with a symphony orchestra, and a symphony orchestra in the Western tradition is a rather elitist institution which prides itself . . . on the high-class status of its operation . . . So Fiedler's genius was to program material which was acceptable for that symphony orchestra, and yet which drew in a large, general public.”

In 1980, at age 36, Wayland was one of the conductors in the running to replace Fiedler. Others included Mitch Miller, Henry Mancini, Franz Allers, John Williams, Frederick Fennell, Michael Sasson, John Mauceri, John Lanchbery and Norman Lyden. John Williams was ultimately selected.

By 1984, Wayland was guest-conducting up to 20 symphony concerts per year. During this period, he had these requirements for his shows: first, that the concert be audience-oriented; second, to program a variety of somewhat different or unusual works, along with familiar ones; third, the concert had to be challenging for the orchestra. Wayland also wanted to challenge himself. “I don’t want to rest on my laurels and do the same old stuff I know works.” He said “live performance can be visual and exciting – an event; a festive occasion, in a variety of ways: improvised now happenings, audience clap-alongs and sing-alongs.”

The Boston Herald dubbed Wayland “a musician who refuses to be tied down to a single category.” His adventurous nature was exhibited throughout his conducting career, such as when he used garden hoses as instruments in his concert tribute to Arthur Fieldler.

== Conducting highlights ==
- Regular guest conductor at the Boston Pops Orchestra, the National Symphony (Washington D.C.), the Vancouver (B.C.) Symphony Orchestra and many others. 1974 - 1980
- Midwest Pops Orchestra – conductor 1980
- Principal pops conductor with the Houston Symphony Orchestra - 1991
- Principal pops conductor with the South Bend Symphony Orchestra 1980-1991
- Resident Pops Conductor for the Oakland (California) Symphony.
- European debut leading the Orchestre National de Lyon (Gershwin program)
- New York City debut with Peter Schickele in the P.D.Q. Bach Christmas concerts at Carnegie Hall.
- Conducted Schickele's “Oedipus Tex & Other Choral Calamities,” which won the 1991 GRAMMY Award for Best Comedy Album
- Conducted the Pacific Symphony Orchestra in two evenings with renowned singer and pianist Ray Charles

== Musical projects ==
A gifted pianist and harpsichordist, Wayland was the first-call keyboardist for the Boston Symphony throughout the 1960s and provided keyboards for his own performing and recording groups throughout his career. A Boston Symphony Orchestra highlight was his accompaniment of soprano Beverly Sills as the harpsichordist for the Orchestra's staged performance of the U.S. premiere of the original, 1912 version of Richard Strauss and Hugo von Hofmannsthal's "Ariadne Auf Naxos." It was telecast live from Symphony Hall, Boston on January 7, 1969, and released on DVD in 2006.

Other notable performances include:

- Pianist and harpsichordist with the Boston Symphony Orchestra -1963 – 1973
- Performed as a pianist on numerous recordings with Fiedler, Seiji Ozawa, Michael Tilson Thomas, Steinberg and Erich Leinsdorf conducting the Boston Symphony and Boston Pops Orchestras.
- Adventures in Music: With members of the Boston Symphony, conducted and performed in a children's concert series throughout Massachusetts - 1967-1977
- Was the original music director and arranger of the off-Broadway musical Berlin to Broadway with Kurt Weill at the Theater de Lys in New York -1972
- Performed Steve Reich’s "Four Organs" at the mainstream concert-hall debut, along with Reich, Ayrton Pinto and Tilson Thomas at Symphony Hall in Boston - October 8 & 9, 1971

Wayland told the Santa Barbara News-Press, “as for my own musical style, you could say I am Bartokian, Hindemithian –with a considerable dose of jazz.” In the 1960s, Wayland formed a performing group called “The Great All-American Music Machine.” The group consisted of Wayland on keyboards, Frank Nizzari (alto, soprano, baritone saxophone), Ken Wenzwll (electric bass, trumpet, trombone, fluegelhorn, flute), John Chiodini (guitar, bass, banjo), Fred Budda (percussion), Jan Curtis (Mezzo-soprano), and David Evitts (Baritone). They performed and recorded ragtime, opera, folk, pop, jazz, classical, musical comedy and even rock music, as well as Wayland's original compositions.

== Music for television ==
While a student at the New England Conservatory, Wayland was the host of the educational TV show “Performance.” After the Conservatory, Wayland was a Rockefeller Artist-in Residence at WGBH-TV in Boston. He was musical director of the WCVB-TV Boston series Catch a Rainbow 1977–1978. He also arranged music scores for many network television shows, including compositions and arrangements for PBS' Nova.

Wayland was the first and only music director for ZOOM, the Emmy award-winning PBS children's show. He was the music director for ZOOM from 1971 to 1978 and wrote both the theme song “Come on and ZOOM” as well as the "Send it to ZOOM" address song.

== Recordings ==
Wayland's discography includes:

- George Gershwin Plays Rhapsody in Blue Using the Original Piano Rolls (Pro-Arte CDD 352) (Reached 16 on Billboard's classical charts)
- Jazz Loves Bach (Four Corners of the Earth FCS 4249). Arrangements by Newton Wayland (1968)
- Up, Up and Away” RCA LSC 3041 (1971) Arrangements performed by Boston Pops Orchestra, Arthur Fieldler conductor (also piano soloist).
- Berlin to Broadway with Kurt Weill (1972) Paramount PAS 4000. Conductor and Arranger
- Fieldler In Rags (1974) Polydor 6033 Arrangements and Piano Soloist (4 pieces)
- Come on and ZOOM (1974) A&M SP 3402 Music director, Arranger, Co-Producer, Keyboardist
- ZOOM Tunes (1978) Rounder Records 8005 Music director, Arranger, Co-Producer, Keyboardist
- Best of the Beatles: Classical Interpretation - Conductor
- The Ill-Conceived P.D.Q. Bach Anthology by P.D.Q. Bach - Conductor
- Strike up the Band by Louis Smith - Performer
- Adagios: Romantic Escapes for the Dreamer in You by Boston Pops Orchestra - Pianist
- The Arthur Fiedler Legacy: Stars and Stripes - An American Concert by Arthur Fiedler - Pianist
- Blue Tango: Leroy Anderson's Greatest Hits by Erich Kunzel - Conductor
- Stress Busters: Music for a Less-Stress World by Arthur Fiedler - Pianist
- Encores: Best of the Pops by Newton Wayland - Primary Artist, Piano, Conductor
- Duke Ellington's Greatest Hits [Pro Arte] by Erich Kunzel - Contributor
- Yankee Doodle Dandy by James Cagney - Conductor
- Satin Doll by Newton Wayland - Pianist, Arranger
- Big Band Salute [Intersound 1995] - Performer
- Fieldler's Favorites by Arthur Fiedler - Piano, Conductor, Track Performer
- Passion: The Music of Love - Performer
- Music of the Beatles [Intersound] - Conductor
- Beatles Greatest Hits by Newton Wayland - Primary Artist, Track Performer
- In the Mood: Big Band's Greatest Hits by the Houston Symphony Orchestra - Track Performer
- World's Greatest Lovesongs - Performer
- TV's Greatest Hits by Newton Wayland - Primary Artist, Piano
- Prime Time: 30 Hit TV Themes by Houston Symphony Orchestra - Conductor
- Pop Go The Beatles [Pro Arte] - Newton Wayland Rochester Pops

== Personal ==
Wayland married American mezzo-soprano, Jan Curtis, in 1969. The couple performed together for many years before the marriage ended in divorce.

Wayland was a resident of Groton, Massachusetts for many years and was known for giving honey his bees produced for Halloween.

== Videography ==
Strauss: Ariadne auf Naxos [original version] (Sills, Nagy; Leinsdorf, 1969) [live Concert Version] VAI
