= Three to Tango =

1999 American-Australian romantic comedy film

- Theatrical release poster
- Directed by: Damon Santostefano
- Written by: Rodney Patrick Vaccaro; Aline Brosh McKenna
- Produced by: Jeffrey Silver; Bettina Sofia Viviano
- Starring: Matthew Perry; Neve Campbell; Dylan McDermott; Oliver Platt
- Cinematography: Walt Lloyd
- Edited by: Stephen Semel
- Music by: Graeme Revell
- Production companies: Village Roadshow Pictures; Village-Hoyts Film Partnership; Outlaw Productions
- Distributed by: Warner Bros. (Worldwide); Roadshow Entertainment (Australia & New Zealand)
- Release date: October 22, 1999
- Running time: 98 minutes
- Countries: Australia; United States
- Language: English
- Budget: $20 million
- Box office: $10.6 million

Three to Tango is a 1999 romantic comedy film directed by Damon Santostefano, written by Rodney Patrick Vaccaro and Aline Brosh McKenna, and starring Matthew Perry, Neve Campbell, Dylan McDermott and Oliver Platt.

== Plot ==
Architects Oscar Novak and Peter Steinberg have just landed a career-making opportunity to design a multimillion-dollar cultural center for wealthy businessman Charles Newman. In a ploy for publicity, Newman has pitched Oscar and Peter in a neck-and-neck competition with their archrivals and former colleagues, the hugely successful Decker and Strauss. When Newman meets Oscar and Peter, he assumes that they are lovers; Peter is gay, but Oscar is straight. Under the mistaken impression that Oscar is also gay, he asks Oscar to keep an eye on his mistress Amy and make sure that she does not talk to his wife Olivia. Oscar falls for Amy virtually on sight, but she also thinks he is gay. He is forced to maintain the charade to avoid getting into trouble with Newman, and losing the commission.

Matters become complicated when a news article about Oscar and Peter's supposed relationship is published in a newspaper, leaving Oscar in the increasingly frustrating position of having to fend off advances from various gay men while convincing his friends and family that he is simply pretending to be gay. Amy even sets him up on a date with her ex-boyfriend, football player Kevin Cartwright, but Oscar manages to defuse the situation by saying that he is in love with someone else. Despite the embarrassing misconceptions, Oscar forms a close bond with Amy as they continue to spend time together, to the extent that Amy moves in with him after she is kicked out of her apartment. At the final presentation for the cultural center, Oscar and Peter receive the commission, but Oscar is simultaneously told that he has won the award for Gay Professional Man of the Year, with Newman deciding that he will reveal his decision after the ceremony.

After an awkward meeting between Amy and Olivia at the party, Amy and Oscar go to a bar where, uncomfortable after meeting Olivia in person for the first time, Amy leaves in frustration after she nearly kisses Oscar. This prompts a brief argument between Amy and Oscar, in which Oscar states that her relationship with Newman has no future, and that the reason Amy and Newman have never fought is because Newman doesn't care enough about Amy to fight with her. Amy counters that Oscar is hardly in a position to criticize her love life when he hasn't been on a date since they met.

After spending the day alone, Oscar attends the award ceremony for Gay Professional Man of the Year. Although he initially continues his charade, he looks out at the people before him and instead makes a passionate speech about how he admires all the men and women there who were able to tell the truth to their families about who they really were, ending the speech by his own "coming out of the closet," admitting that he is straight and in love with Amy.

As he is applauded for having the courage to admit the truth, he runs after Amy, only for her to punch both him and Newman and storm out. Peter then awkwardly accepts the prize that comes with the award: a date with Kevin. However, as Oscar sits in a restaurant where he and Amy ate together on the night they met, Amy comes to see him. After confirming that there are no other lies and he genuinely regrets the deception, she says that she loves him too, and they kiss.

During the credit scene, Olivia convinces Newman to go with Oscar and Peter's design, revealing that she knew about him and Amy and informing him bluntly that Oscar and Peter did the better job.

== Cast ==
- Matthew Perry as Oscar Novak
- Neve Campbell as Amy Post
- Dylan McDermott as Charles Newman
- Oliver Platt as Peter Steinberg
- Cylk Cozart as Kevin Cartwright
- John C. McGinley as Josh Strauss
- Bob Balaban as Decker
- Deborah Rush as Lenore
- Kelly Rowan as Olivia Newman

== Production ==
In March 1998 it was announced Matthew Perry and Neve Campbell were in talks with Outlaw Productions and Warner Bros. Pictures. to headline Three to Tango written by Rodney Patrick Vaccaro, with rewrites by Aileen Brosh. The film was slated to be the directorial debut of Damon Santostefano following dropping out of directing Tristar's Idle Hands. Three to Tango was co-produced by Warner Bros. and Australia's Village Roadshow Pictures Entertainment.

== Reception ==
On the review aggregator website Rotten Tomatoes, 29% of 66 critics' reviews are positive, with an average rating of 4.4/10. The website's consensus reads: "A mediocre episode of Friends has more humor and less offensive gay jokes."

Roger Ebert praised Neve Campbell's appeal but gave the film one star, saying it had "an Idiot Plot, in which no one ever says what obviously must be said to clear up the confusion." Writing for The New York Times, Stephen Holden criticized the film for its predictability and use of gay clichés. "In trying to be both bold and nonthreatening, the movie ends up seeming tame and mildly offensive."

The film fared poorly with audiences as well as critics. Three to Tango opened at #8 at the box office, bringing in $4.4 million on its opening weekend, and earning $10.6 million overall, against a budget of $20 million. Audiences polled by CinemaScore gave the film an average grade of "C" on an A+ to F scale.

== Filming locations ==
Although Three to Tango is set in Chicago, it was filmed in Toronto, Ontario.

== Soundtrack ==
Three to Tango: Music From And Inspired By The Motion Picture

Soundtrack album by various artists
- Released: 26 October 1999
- Genre: Pop/Rock
- Length: 46:17 minutes
- Label: Atlantic
- Producer: Brad Benedict

Professional ratings
Review scores
Source	Rating
AllMusic	3/5 stars

A soundtrack of music "from and inspired by" Three to Tango was released by Atlantic Records on 26 October 1999. It featured new music by the Brian Setzer Orchestra, Cherry Poppin' Daddies, and Mighty Blue Kings, as well as previously released tracks by Squirrel Nut Zippers, Royal Crown Revue, and The Atomic Fireballs.

No.	Title	Writer(s)	Recording artist(s)	Length
1.	"Jumpin' East Of Java"	Brian Setzer	Brian Setzer Orchestra	2:35
2.	"Swing Sweet Pussycat"	John Bunkley	The Atomic Fireballs	3:09
3.	"Maddest Kind of Love"	Scotty Morris	Big Bad Voodoo Daddy	5:04
4.	"Mr. Zoot Suit"	Mark Cally	The Flying Neutrinos	2:38
5.	"Here Comes the Snake"	Steve Perry	Cherry Poppin' Daddies	2:55
6.	"Trou Macacq"	Tom Maxwell	Squirrel Nut Zippers	3:16
7.	"Datin' With No Dough"	Eddie Nichols / Bill Ungerman	Royal Crown Revue	2:34
8.	"Violent Love"	Willie Dixon	Indigo Swing	2:11
9.	"Go Tell the Preacher"	Ross Bon	The Mighty Blue Kings	2:52
10.	"Lint"		The Outsiders	3:31
11.	"Goin' Out of My Head"	Teddy Randazzo / Bob Weinstein	Dr. John	3:53
12.	"Salt in My Woulds"	Alan Mirikitani / Dennis Walker	Shemekia Copeland	4:10
13.	"That Says It All"	Duncan Sheik	Duncan Sheik	4:13
14.	"Let's Get Outta Here"	Graeme Revell	Graeme Revell	3:16
Total length:				46:17
