= Joanna Lee (writer) =

American screenwriter

- Publicity Photo of Joanna Lee
- Born: April 7, 1931; Newark, New Jersey, U.S.
- Died: October 24, 2003 (aged 72); Santa Monica, California, U.S.
- Occupations: Television director; screenwriter; actress; executive producer
- Years active: 1956–1990
- Known for: The Flintstones; Room 222; Gilligan's Island; The Waltons
- Awards: Primetime Emmy Award for Outstanding Writing for a Drama Series

Joanna Lee (April 7, 1931 – October 24, 2003) was an American writer, producer, director and actress.

== Career ==
The Newark, New Jersey-born actress's career was only in small roles, 10 in all, including seven TV series and three feature films, all between 1956 and 1961. The latter included an uncredited appearance in a lesser-known Frank Sinatra film, The Joker Is Wild (1957), plus two low-budget science fiction films. Those two were The Brain Eaters (1958) and a film that in later years would come to be regarded as the quintessential 'so-bad-it's-good' cult classic, Plan 9 from Outer Space (1959), in which Lee portrays "Tanna" the space girl.

A serious car accident in 1961 necessitated a career change. By 1962, Lee had landed writing assignments for My Three Sons and The Flintstones. She wrote more than 20 episodes of The Flintstones and is widely credited with creating The Great Gazoo. She wrote an episode of Gilligan's Island (1964–67), entitled "Beauty Is as Beauty Does", which aired on September 23, 1965. Lee also wrote two episodes for the final season of the series, each of which based the plot line on one of the castaways meeting their double. Also in this period (September 1962) she appeared as a contestant on the CBS television program What's My Line, describing her work at that point as being a TV comedy writer. In her June 11, 1959 appearance on You Bet Your Life, Joanna Lee describes her career and also wins $3,000 in prize money.

Lee’s writing career stretched from 1962 until 1990, including many dozens of comedic and dramatic television series episodes before writing, producing, and directing various TV movies and "Afterschool Specials." In 1971 she wrote two scripts for the television show, Room 222.

In 1974, Lee won an Emmy Award for Best Writing in Drama, for a 1973 Thanksgiving episode of The Waltons. The same year, she formed her own production company, which, in 1975, produced the documentary Babe (also written by Lee), about athlete Babe Zaharias's career. The film was nominated for an Emmy for "Outstanding Writing in a Special Program - Drama or Comedy - Original Teleplay," and won the Golden Globe for "Best Motion Picture Made for Television."

Lee wrote the novel and teleplay Mary Jane Harper Cried Last Night. In 1988, she won the Humanitas Prize for The Kid Who Wouldn't Quit: The Brad Silverman Story.

== Personal life and death ==
Her son, Craig Lee, then a music director at L. A. Weekly, died of AIDS in 1992. Another son, Christopher Ciampa, appeared in several of her films.

Her autobiography, A Difficult Woman in Hollywood, was published in 1999.

Lee died from bone cancer on October 24, 2003, in Santa Monica, at the age of 72.

== Filmography ==
=== Film ===
Year	Title	Role	Notes
1957	Plan 9 from Outer Space	Tanna	independent science fiction horror film
1957	The Joker Is Wild	Chorine (uncredited)	biographical musical film
1958	The Brain Eaters	Alice Summers	horror science fiction film
1974	A Pocket Filled with Dreams		also credited as director and writer (final film of Joanna Lee)

=== Television ===
Year	Title	Role	Notes
1956	The Joseph Cotten Show aka On Trial	Clare	Episode: "Twice in Peril"
1957	The 20th Century Fox Hour	Salesgirl	Episode: "The Marriage Broker"
1958	Leave It to Beaver	Classified ad lady at Courier Sun	Episode: "Beaver and Poncho"
1958	How to Marry a Millionaire	Secretary	Episode: "Loco Vs Wall Street"
1959	The Donna Reed Show	Connie	Episode: "Donna Plays Cupid"
1959	Death Valley Days	Laura	Episode: "Pioneer Circus"
1960	Death Valley Days	Flora Dodd	Episode: "The General Who Disappeared"
1960	Tales of Wells Fargo	Antoinette	Episode: "Kid Brother"
1960	Happy	Gwen Kimball	Episode: "Chris' Night Out"
1960	Manhunt	Jane	Episode: "The Payoff Man'
1961	Manhunt	Mona Thompson	Episode: "The Dead Antelope/Gazelle"
1961	Miami Undercover	Christine	Episode: "Wrong Pigeon"

== Awards and nominations ==
Year	Award	Category	Production	Result
1973	Emmy Awards	Primetime Emmy Award for Outstanding Writing for a Drama Series	The Waltons "The Thanksgiving Story"	Won
1975	Emmy Awards	Primetime Emmy Award for Outstanding Writing for a Limited or Anthology Series or Movie	Babe	Nominated
1979	Humanitas Prize	90 minute category	Like Normal People	Nominated
1985	Director Guild of America Awards	Directors Guild of America Award for Outstanding Directorial Achievement in Dramatic Shows - Daytime	CBS Schoolbreak Special "Hear Me Cry"	Nominated
1985	Daytime Emmy Awards	Daytime Emmy Award for Outstanding Writing for a Children's Series	CBS Schoolbreak Special "Hear Me Cry"	Nominated
1985	Daytime Emmy Awards	Daytime Emmy Award for Outstanding Children's Special	CBS Schoolbreak Special "Hear Me Cry"	Nominated
1988	Daytime Emmy Awards	Daytime Emmy Award for Outstanding Children's Special	ABC Afterschool Special "The Kid Who Wouldn't Quit: The Brad Silverman Story"	Nominated
1988	Humanitas Prize	Children's Live Action Television	ABC Afterschool Special "The Kid Who Wouldn't Quit: The Brad Silverman Story"	Won
1990	Daytime Emmy Awards	Daytime Emmy Award for Outstanding Writing for a Children's Series	CBS Schoolbreak Special "15 and Getting Straight"	Nominated
