= Rodney Vaccaro =

American screenwriter and film producer (born 1952)

Rodney Patrick Vaccaro (born April 24, 1952) is an American screenwriter and film producer. He wrote Three to Tango, a 1999 film which starred Matthew Perry, Neve Campbell, and Dylan McDermott, and in 2001 won the Daytime Emmy Award for Outstanding Children's Special for Run the Wild Fields. He has also written several plays and novels.

== Personal life ==
Vaccaro was born in Omaha, Nebraska. When he was 12, his family moved to Grand Rapids, Michigan, where Vaccaro became involved in the local theater. Vaccaro credits his time spent at the Grand Rapids Actors' Theatre with making him into an artist and a writer.

Vaccaro also spent time in France, where he worked with Francine Pascal, and in New York, where he studied at the Actors Studio and the Chekhov Studio. In 1990 he moved to Los Angeles, California. However, he continued to be involved in theater in Grand Rapids.

Vaccaro is a graduate of Grand Rapids Junior College and of Western Michigan University. He has two daughters.

== Career ==
Vaccaro began his career in Hollywood writing scripts for Oscar-winning filmmaker Michael Cimino in the late 1990s, though none of their collaborations amounted to anything. For Cimino, he penned The Dreaming Place, which was to be financed through Trimark Pictures, but its budget was considered too high to see production. His scripts from this period are now considered lost.

In 1999, Vaccaro's script Three to Tango saw the light of day, though it was ultimately rewritten by Aline Brosh McKenna.

In 2001, Vaccaro won the Daytime Emmy Award for Outstanding Children's Special for Run the Wild Fields (tied with A Storm in Summer). He was also nominated that year for the Daytime Emmy Award for Outstanding Writing for A Children's Special for the same film.

Some of his other produced screenplays include MGM's Bigger Than the Sky, featuring John Corbett, Amy Smart, and Sean Astin, TNT's The Engagement Ring, featuring Patricia Heaton, David Hunt, Tony Lo Bianco and Lainie Kazan, and CBS's Snow Wonder starring Mary Tyler Moore.

== Works ==
=== Screenplays ===
- Night of the Running Man (1994) (uncredited)
- Three to Tango (1999)
- Run the Wild Fields (2000) (TV movie)
- Bigger Than the Sky (2005) (also co-producer)
- The Engagement Ring (2005) (TV movie)
- Snow Wonder (2005) (TV movie)
- Unexpected (2023)

=== Teleplays ===
- Static Shock (2000)

=== Stage plays ===
- American Still Life
- Stop Me if You’ve Heard This One
- Brown Red Yellow
- Home of the Brave
- Screenplay By
- The Up System
