= Snow Wonder =

2005 television film by Peter Werner

- Based on: "Just Like the Ones We Used to Know" by Connie Willis
- Written by: Rodney Vaccaro
- Directed by: Peter Werner
- Starring: Julie Ann Emery; Jennifer Esposito; Camryn Manheim; Poppy Montgomery; Jason Priestley; Mary Tyler Moore
- Music by: Ernest Troost
- Country of origin: United States
- Original language: English

Production
- Executive producers: Ragna Nervik; Mark Wolper
- Producers: Gideon Amir; Robert J. Wilson
- Cinematography: Kees Van Oostrum
- Editor: Scott Vickrey
- Running time: 100 minutes
- Production companies: The Wolper Organization; Warner Bros. Television

Original release
- Network: CBS
- Release: November 20, 2005

Snow Wonder is a 2005 American made-for-television drama film adapted from a Connie Willis short story. The film starred Michelle Krusiec, Camryn Manheim, Mary Tyler Moore, Jason Priestley, Josh Randall, and Eric Szmanda, and was produced by The Wolper Organization. It originally aired November 20, 2005, on CBS.

== Plot ==
A freak snowstorm covers the entire world on Christmas Eve, changing the lives of five characters.

== Cast ==
- Julie Ann Emery as Stacey
- Jennifer Esposito as Pilar
- Camryn Manheim as Bev
- Poppy Montgomery as Paula
- Jason Priestley as Warren
- Josh Randall as Billy
- David Sutcliffe as Jim
- Eric Szmanda as Luke
- Mary Tyler Moore as Aunt Lula
- Michelle Krusiec as Joey
- Vince Vieluf as Mario
- Hunter Clary as Miguel

== Critical reception ==
Writing for Variety, critic Brian Lowry called the film "schmaltz" and "a sprawling mishmash of holiday stories", but said that the film "flits between them amiably enough".

== See also ==
- List of Christmas films
