= Studio See =

American TV show

- Genre: Educational; Cinematography
- Created by: Jayne Adair
- Creative director: Jayne Adair
- Country of origin: United States
- Original language: English
- No. of seasons: 2
- No. of episodes: 52

Production
- Executive producer: Christopher Sarson
- Production location: South Carolina
- Production company: South Carolina ETV

Original release
- Network: PBS
- Release: January 22, 1977 – March 26, 1979

Studio See is a magazine-style children's TV show aimed at children 10–15 years old that aired from January 22, 1977, to March 26, 1979, on PBS, with reruns continuing through until 1983. It was also seen on Nickelodeon from 1981 to 1983.

Created by Jayne Adair, Studio See was produced by South Carolina ETV and shot mainly on location nationwide, generally with the help of other PBS member stations.

== Overview ==
In the first season, the shows would open with a teaser where a question would be asked about the features for that particular show. In the second season, a few seconds of a certain feature would be shown.

Regular features included opinion polls where a question was asked, and kids gave their opinions about the topic; and Poetry Power, where viewers submit poems to be read on the air.

Viewers were encouraged to submit ideas and poems to be done and seen on the show and the address would be announced at the end of every show.

The last show of Studio See was a behind-the-scenes tour of what goes on during an episode.

== Series overview ==
Season	Episodes	Originally aired (U.S. dates)	
Season	Episodes	First aired	Last aired
1	26	January 22, 1977	July 16, 1977
2	26	September 30, 1978	March 26, 1979

== Episodes ==
=== Season 1 (1977) ===
- Episode 101 (January 22, 1977)
- Episode 102 (January 29, 1977)
- Nova Scotia (February 5, 1977)
- Episode 104 (February 12, 1977)
- Hot Air Balloon (February 19, 1977)
- Rock Climbing (February 26, 1977)
- Episode 107 (March 5, 1977)
- Episode 108 (March 12, 1977)
- Episode 109 (March 19, 1977)
- Episode 110 (March 26, 1977)
- Episode 111 (April 2, 1977)
- Episode 112 (April 9, 1977)
- Episode 113 (April 16, 1977)
- Episode 114 (April 23, 1977)
- Episode 115 (April 30, 1977)
- Episode 116 (May 7, 1977)
- Episode 117 (May 14, 1977)
- Episode 118 (May 21, 1977)
- Episode 119 (May 28, 1977)
- Episode 120 (June 4, 1977)
- Episode 121 (June 11, 1977)
- Episode 122 (June 18, 1977)
- Episode 123 (June 25, 1977)
- Vaudeville (July 2, 1977)
- ESP (July 9, 1977)
- Episode 126 (July 16, 1977)

=== Season 2 (1978–1979) ===
- Aquariums (September 30, 1978)
- Friends (October 7, 1978)
- Orienteering (October 14, 1978)
- Tubing (October 21, 1978)
- Beluga (October 28, 1978)
- Gymnastics (November 4, 1978)
- Rock Music (November 11, 1978)
- Race Car Family (November 18, 1978)
- Cop Show (December 1, 1978)
- Pizza (December 8, 1978)
- Honor Dance (December 15, 1978)
- Crewing (December 22, 1978)
- Kayaks (December 29, 1978)
- Stunt Kid (January 15, 1979)
- River Boats (January 22, 1979)
- Cowboy (February 5, 1979)
- Cobblers (February 6, 1979)
- Sampler (February 7, 1979)
- Unicycles (February 8, 1979)
- Dirt Bikes (February 9, 1979)
- Jump Rope (March 19, 1979)
- Clearwater (March 20, 1979)
- TV, TV (March 21, 1979)
- Bubble Gum (March 22, 1979)
- Spoleto (March 23, 1979)
- Last Show (March 26, 1979)

== See also ==
- Zoom, another PBS children's program that used content from viewers
