= Women & Men: Stories of Seduction =

- VHS cover art
- Genre: Drama; Romance
- Screenplay by: Valerie Curtin; Joan Didion; John Gregory Dunne
- Directed by: Frederic Raphael; Tony Richardson; Ken Russell
- Starring: James Woods; Melanie Griffith; Beau Bridges; Elizabeth McGovern; Molly Ringwald; Peter Weller
- Composer: Marvin Hamlisch
- Country of origin: United States
- Original language: English

Production
- Executive producers: Colin Callender; Ted Hartley; Jerry Offsay
- Producers: David Brown; William S. Gilmore
- Cinematography: Ernest Day; Billy Williams; Steve Yaconelli
- Editors: John Jympson; Robert K. Lambert
- Running time: 83 minutes
- Production company: HBO Showcase

Original release
- Network: HBO
- Release: August 19, 1990

Women & Men: Stories of Seduction is a 1990 American drama film consisting of three separate short films. The three segments are directed by Frederic Raphael, Tony Richardson, and Ken Russell and written by Valerie Curtin, Joan Didion, and John Gregory Dunne, based on short stories by Ernest Hemingway, Mary McCarthy, and Dorothy Parker. The film stars James Woods, Melanie Griffith, Beau Bridges, Elizabeth McGovern, Molly Ringwald, and Peter Weller. The film premiered on HBO on August 19, 1990. A second installment, featuring three more stories, was released the following year, Women & Men 2.

== Plot ==
The three stories being adapted are "Hills Like White Elephants" by Ernest Hemingway, "The Man in the Brooks Brothers Suit" by Mary McCarthy, and "Dusk Before Fireworks" by Dorothy Parker. All are about romantic liaisons.

== Cast ==
- James Woods as Robert
- Melanie Griffith as Hadley
- Beau Bridges as Gerry Green
- Elizabeth McGovern as Vicki
- Molly Ringwald as Kit
- Peter Weller as Hobie
- Kyra Sedgwick as Arlene
- Philip O'Brien as Vicki's Father
