= Kaleigh Cronin =

American actress

- Born: Kaleigh Elizabeth Cronin; April 12, 1989 (age 37); Manchester, New Hampshire, U.S.
- Occupations: Actress; singer
- Years active: 2001–present
- Website: www.kaleighcronin.com

Kaleigh Elizabeth Cronin (born April 12, 1989) is an American actress. She is best known for appearing on the third and fourth seasons of the revival of the PBS Kids television show ZOOM in the early 2000s and her work on Broadway.

== Performances ==
=== Television ===
Year	Title	Role	Notes
2001–2002	Zoom	"Kaleigh" (self)	61 episodes

=== Theatre ===
Year	Title	Role(s)	Notes
2010	Crazy for You	Tess	Music Theatre Wichita
2010	Annie	Lilly	Music Theatre Wichita
2011	Sunset Boulevard	Betty Schaefer	Music Theatre Wichita
2011–13	Jersey Boys	Lorraine	Second National Tour
2014–2015	Cabaret	Lulu; Fraulein Kost (understudy); Sally Bowles (understudy)	Studio 54, Broadway
2015	Victor/Victoria	Paris by Night	Ogunquit Playhouse
2016	A Bronx Tale	Ensemble	Paper Mill Playhouse, pre-Broadway
2016	Cabaret	Sally Bowles	Sacramento Music Circus
2016–2018	A Bronx Tale	Ensemble; Rosina (understudy)	Longacre Theatre, Broadway
2018	Summer: The Donna Summer Musical	Giorgio Moroder; Ensemble	Lunt-Fontanne Theatre, Broadway
2019	Sophisticated Ladies	Sophistication	Crossroads Theatre, New Jersey Performing Arts Center
2019	The Drowsy Chaperone	Janet Van De Graaf	Sacramento Music Circus
2021–2022	Mrs. Doubtfire	Sexy Soccer Woman; Helga; Ensemble; Janet Lundy (understudy)	Stephen Sondheim Theatre, Broadway
2023	Bad Cinderella	Ensemble; Queen (understudy)	Imperial Theatre, Broadway
2024	Once Upon a Mattress	Ensemble	New York City Center, Off-Broadway
2024–2026	Death Becomes Her	Ensemble; Stacey; Madeline Ashton (understudy); Helen Sharp (understudy)	Lunt-Fontanne Theatre, Broadway
2026	Schmigadoon!	Ensemble; Helen Pritt; Melissa Gimble (understudy); Mildard Layton (understudy)	Nedelander Theatre, Broadway
