= Come One, Come All =

Studio album by Mighty Blue Kings
- Released: 1997
- Genre: Jump blues
- Label: R-Jay
- Producer: Mighty Blue Kings

Mighty Blue Kings chronology
Meet Me in Uptown (1996)	Come One, Come All (1997)	Live from Chicago (1998)

Come One, Come All is the second album by the American band Mighty Blue Kings, released in 1997.

The album peaked at No. 10 on Billboard's Top Blues Albums chart. The band supported the album by touring with the Reverend Horton Heat and Face to Face.

== Production ==
The album was produced by the band. It includes covers of songs by Louis Jordan, Joe Liggins, and Percy Mayfield, among others. Six of the 12 tracks are originals by the band. Mighty Blue Kings dropped two members prior to the recording sessions for the album.

== Critical reception ==
Professional ratings
Review scores
Source	Rating
AllMusic	4.5/5 stars
The Indianapolis Star	3.5/4 stars
MusicHound Rock: The Essential Album Guide	4/5 stars
The Plain Dealer	A

The Washington Post wrote that "the blues ballads suffer by comparison—seasoning counts for something, after all—but even the album's weakest tracks attest to the band's obvious devotion and good taste." The A.V. Club noted that the album "sticks to a relatively rigid Chicago-blues template." The Orange County Register deemed the album more polished than the debut, and concluded that "rockabilly is as revered as rabble-rousing swing, but barrel-throated vocalist Ross Bon finely fuses the two with a little crooning here, a lot of hollering there."

The Chicago Tribune thought that "lead vocalist Ross Bon has developed into a self-assured recording artist, his warm baritone, sleek phrasing and distinctive lyric reading giving the band—and this recording—its focus and identity." The Indianapolis Star determined that Come One, Come All "swings and sways and rocks with a sound that's both true to its World War II-era roots and the need to be contemporary." The Plain Dealer praised the "original vision of jazzy, dance-oriented rhythm and blues and jump."

AllMusic wrote that the album "still sounds a little stiff compared to classic jump blues, but it's still an entertaining record."

== Track listing ==
No.	Title	Length
1.	"I Can't Stop It"
2.	"Baby You Rich"
3.	"Go Tell the Preacher"
4.	"Little Too Late"
5.	"Put Your Hand in Mine"
6.	"Looking for My Baby"
7.	"What's a Man to Do"
8.	"Don't Let Go"
9.	"Got the Sun Shinin' on Me"
10.	"Long Distance Lover"
11.	"No Blow, No Show"
12.	"Green Grass Grows All Around"
