= Zoom (1972 TV series) =

Educational television series

- Genre: Educational
- Created by: Christopher Sarson
- Starring: See Cast section
- Country of origin: United States
- Original language: English
- No. of seasons: 6
- No. of episodes: 155

Production
- Executive producers: Christopher Sarson (1972–1974); Kate Taylor (1975–1978)
- Production locations: WGBH Studios; Boston, Massachusetts
- Camera setup: Segments
- Production company: WGBH-TV

Original release
- Network: PBS
- Release: January 9, 1972 – February 10, 1978

Related
- Zoom (1999 series)

Zoom (stylized as ZOOM) is a half-hour educational television program, created almost entirely by children, that aired on PBS originally from January 9, 1972, to February 10, 1978, with reruns being shown until September 12, 1980. It was originated and produced by WGBH-TV in Boston. Inspired by educational shows like Sesame Street and The Electric Company, more specifically the British kids show Why Don't You?, but designed to give the kids who watched it a voice without adults on screen, it was, for the most part, unscripted. Far from seeking to make stars of the child performers, their contracts prohibited them from making any television appearances or doing commercials for three years after they left the show.

The show was revived in 1999 and aired on PBS until 2005.

== Premise ==
A cast of seven kids (ten in Season 4) known as ZOOMers presented various activities such as games, plays, poems, recipes, jokes, movies and science experiments, all suggested by viewer contributions. These activities were introduced by such titles as ZOOMovie, ZOOM Play of the Week, ZOOMgame, ZOOMdo, ZOOMgoody, ZOOMphenomenon, etc. The cast also had informal chats on subjects such as hospitals, school, family and prejudice, titled ZOOMraps. Each episode ended with a choreographed song performed by the cast.

The ZOOMers were only identified by first names, and in the early seasons half the cast were replaced every six months, allowing a set of veteran cast members to help new members become accustomed to the show. The cast was chosen by audition, and the producers made efforts to include children of multiple cultures and backgrounds.

The mail-in request became a pop culture reference for its musical exhortation to "Write ZOOM, Z-double-O-M, Box 3-5-0, Boston, Mass 0-2-1-3-4: send it to ZOOM!". The lines were mostly spoken, but the zip code was sung.

In the opening sequence, each cast member performed a brief "signature move", and second season cast member Bernadette's "arm thing" (a helicopter-like series of arm moves) became famous among the show's young audience. By popular demand, Bernadette eventually explained on the show how to perform the move.

The program featured its own language, Ubbi-Dubbi, where the syllable "ub" was added before each vowel sound in each syllable of each word ("H-ub-i, fr-ub-iends," etc.). For the first two seasons, a word game named "Fannee Doolee" was featured, in which a series of statements about the titular character were presented to the audience without further explanation (e.g., "Fannee Doolee likes sweets, but hates candy"). It was eventually revealed that Fannee Doolee loved all words with double letters and hated all words without them.

Each show had one or two ZOOMguest sequences, short film documentaries about children with special talents (singing, tap-dancing, instrument-making, etc.) or interesting hobbies or jobs. The premiere episode featured a boy who built a boat by making a ring of sticks and twigs and covering them with a tarpaulin.

Throughout the show's run, Newton Wayland was the musical director, while Billy Wilson handled choreography during the first four seasons.

In the show's first two seasons, Tracy hosted a "Tracy Asks..." sequence in which she asked a question, e.g., "Which came first, the chicken or the egg?" or "What is the world's longest word?", and local children were filmed giving their answers. In later episodes, other cast members hosted and the segment was retitled "ZOOM in the Street". The first two seasons had "quickie" comedy routines modeled after Rowan and Martin's Laugh-In. Season 4 featured a recurring mock-soap opera titled As the World ZOOMs.

The performers in the original series were known for wearing striped rugby shirts and jeans. The cast often performed barefoot in seasons 1 and 2 but wore shoes from season 3 on.

The first ZOOM series lasted six seasons (1972–1978) and featured 49 ZOOMers. During the second and third seasons, cast members were transitioned with a catchy production number that introduced the new cast members to the continuing cast members. The same song was used for each transition ("How do ya do do-dee-do, how do ya do-dee-do-dee-do, how's your sister, how's your brother, how are you?"), based on the Woody Guthrie song "Howjadoo". In the last three seasons, entirely new casts were used. The show took a hiatus from 1975 to 1976 while WGBH-TV sought a new corporate underwriter, eventually landing General Foods Corporation.

Several episodes were available with captions for the hard-of-hearing.

== Cast (in order by introduction in the opening song) ==
Season	Cast Member #1	Cast Member #2	Cast Member #3	Cast Member #4	Cast Member #5	Cast Member #6	Cast Member #7	Cast Member #8	Cast Member #9	Cast Member #10
1 (1972)	Joe Shrand	Nina Lillie	Kenny Pires	Tracy Tannebring	Tommy White	Nancy Tates	Jon Reuning			
2 (1972–1973)	Maura Mullaney	Kenny Pires	Ann Messer	David Alberico	Nancy Tates	Jay Schertzer	Tracy Tannebring			
2 (1972–1973)	Maura Mullaney	Luiz Gonzales	Ann Messer	David Alberico	Bernadette Yao	Jay Schertzer	Leon Mobley			
2 (1972–1973)	Edith Mooers	Luiz Gonzales	Lori Boskin	Danny McGrath	Bernadette Yao	Leon Mobley	Neal Johnson			
3 (1973–1974)	Danny McGrath	Edith Mooers	Mike Dean	Donna Moore	Timmy Pruce	Lori Boskin	Neal Johnson			
3 (1973–1974)	Mike Dean	Rose Clarkow	Hector Dorta	Donna Moore	Timmy Pruce	Shawn Miranda Reed	Danny Malloy			
4 (1974–1975)	Harvey Reed	Tishy Flaherty	David "Red" O'Brien	Cate Wadsworth	Norman Christian	Tracey Dellaria	Tommy Schultz	Carmen Hernandez	David Azzoto	Andrae Wyatt
5 (1976)	Chris Blackwell	Jennifer Gold	Ron Richmond	Arcadio Gonzales	Karen Wing	Levell Gethers	Nell Cox			
6 (1977–1978)	Amy Clark	John Lathan	Carolyn Malcolm	Nicholas Butterworth	Shona de Nile	Chee Kim	Susan Wolf			

- Maura Mullaney appeared as a ZOOMguest in a Season 1 episode before becoming a cast member, the only cast member to do so.
- Donna Moore contributed a play to "ZOOM Play of the Week" in ZOOM's premiere episode before becoming a cast member.
- Some PBS stations continued to broadcast reruns of the series until September 12, 1980.

== Merchandise ==
In 1973, the cast members from the first season released an album titled Playgrounds (LP OCLC 3399239) (produced by Rupert Holmes) that was available by mail order.

In 1974, A&M Records released an album of songs from the show titled Come on and ZOOM (LP OCLC 3060311; cassette OCLC 18900529), featuring various cast members from the second season and third season. The catalogue number of the album was SP-3402 (213 402 under the PolyGram system).

In 1977, Rounder Records released ZOOM Tunes, featuring various cast members from the third season, fourth season, and fifth season. John Nagy and Newton Wayland produced the latter two albums.

Two books for children were based on the 1970s ZOOM series:

- The ZOOM Catalog (ISBN 0394825322), published by Random House in 1972, was a collection of stories, poems, plays, jokes and activities from the show, featuring the second cast.
- Do a ZOOMdo, published by Little Brown in 1975, was a collection of activities from the show, featuring cast members from the second and third seasons.

On December 1, 1998, WGBH released the video-and-book set Best of the 70s and ZOOMers Revisited — Where Are They Now? (ISBN 1578072077).

On October 28, 2008, WGBH released a two-DVD set, ZOOM Back to the '70s. The first DVD was a reissue of Best of the 70s, with extras consisting of behind the scenes stills set to the theme song and a 10-question quiz asking what a few of the cast members are doing today. The second DVD consisted of four episodes from the series.

== 50th anniversary ==
At the show's 50th anniversary in 2022, WGBH posted all surviving episodes online. On January 28, 2022, original executive producer Christopher Sarson and members of the first cast appeared in online video chats, followed on February 2, 2022, by a chat with Sarson and cast members from the second and third seasons.

== See also ==
- Play School, the series Zoom was inspired by
- Studio See, another PBS children's program that used content from viewers
- Zoom (1999 TV series), 1999 remake of the 1972 series
