= Ross Bon & The Mighty Blue Kings =

American jump blues band formed 1995

The feet
- Years active: 1995–2001, 2010–present
- Labels: R-Jay Records, Sony Records
- Members: Ross Bon
- Past members: Gareth Best, Jimmy Sutton, Bob Carter, Donny Nichilo, Samuel Burckhardt, Jerry DeVivo, Brett Simons, Simon Sweet, Jonathan Doyle, Mark Colby

The Mighty Blue Kings is a Chicago jump blues band, formed in 1995.

Ross Bon was part of the Chicago music scene beginning in 1992 as a harmonica player and vocalist. He recorded with artists such as Willie “Big” Smith, Buddy Scott, Pinetop Perkins, Junior Wells, Dave Specter, James Cotton and Kim Wilson.

In 1995, he joined with guitarist Gareth Best, bassist Jimmy Sutton, drummer Bob Carter, pianist Donny Nichilo and saxophonists Samuel Burckhardt and Jerry DeVivo to form the Mighty Blue Kings. They made their debut performance opening for the late Junior Wells at Buddy Guy's legends in Chicago; and followed up with a weekly residence at Chicago jazz club The Green Mill. Later, the band toured the US.

The band's lineup for their 1998 release, Come One, Come All, consisted of Bon, Best, DeVivo on drums, bassist Brett Simons, keyboardist Simon Sweet and saxophonists Jonathan Doyle and Mark Colby.

The band released two studio albums, Meet Me In Uptown (1995), and Come One, Come All (R-Jay Records). Together, they sold over 100,000 copies, with the latter having debuted in the top ten on Billboard's Blues Album chart. They subsequently released three additional albums, Live From Chicago, (reaching #14 on Billboard's Blues Album charts), the holiday record, The Christmas Album and Alive In The City.

The Mighty Blue Kings disbanded around 2001. In early 2010 Ross Bon formed a new band under the name, Ross Bon & The Mighty Blue Kings.

== Releases ==
- Meet Me In Uptown—1997
- Come One, Come All—1998 (#10 on Billboard's Blues Chart)
- Live from Chicago—1999 (#14 on Billboard's Blues Chart
- Christmas Album—2000
- Alive In The City—2001 (#16 Living Blues Chart)
