= A Storm in Summer =

2000 American drama television film

- Home video cover art
- Genre: Drama
- Based on: 1970 screenplay: Rod Serling
- Written by: Rod Serling
- Directed by: Robert Wise
- Starring: Peter Falk; Andrew McCarthy; Nastassja Kinski; Aaron Meeks
- Music by: Cynthia Millar
- Country of origin: United States
- Original language: English

Production
- Executive producer: Robert Halmi Jr.
- Producer: Renée Valente
- Cinematography: Bert Dunk
- Editor: Jack Hofstra
- Running time: 94 minutes
- Production company: Hallmark Entertainment

Original release
- Network: Showtime
- Release: February 27, 2000

A Storm in Summer is a 2000 American made-for-television drama film directed by Robert Wise and starring Peter Falk, Andrew McCarthy, Nastassja Kinski, and Ruby Dee. The film premiered on Showtime on February 27, 2000. It is the last film to be directed by Wise. Rod Serling's original script had previously been adapted as a 1970 television film directed by Buzz Kulik starring Peter Ustinov and N'Gai Dixon, and the filmmakers re-used the same script for this production. Serling's script was posthumously honored with an Emmy nomination and a Writers Guild Award.

Producer Renee Valente won a Daytime Emmy in 2001 for her work on the film.

== Plot ==
A lonely, bitter man (Peter Falk) bonds with an inner-city boy (Aaron Meeks) entrusted to his care in upstate New York.

== Cast ==
- Peter Falk as Abel Shaddick
- Andrew McCarthy as Stanley
- Nastassja Kinski as Gloria Ross
- Aaron Meeks as Herman D. Washington
- Ruby Dee as Grandmother
- Keith Martin Gordey as Cop
- Ingrid Torrance as Harriet
- Ty Olsson as Biker
- Gillian Barber as Mrs. Parker
- Lillian Carlson as Mrs. Gold

== Accolades ==
At the 28th Daytime Emmy Awards, the film was co-winner of the Daytime Emmy Award for Outstanding Children's Special along with Run the Wild Fields. Peter Falk was nominated for Outstanding Performer in a Children's Special but did not win.
