= Daytime Emmy Award for Outstanding Children's Special =

Former television award

The Daytime Emmy Award for Outstanding Children's Special was an Emmy award given to television programming aimed towards children. Television movies, dramatic specials, and non-fiction programming were all eligible. The award had been presented since the inaugural year; however, it was retired after 2007.

== Winners and Nominees ==
Winners in bold

=== Outstanding Children's Entertainment Special ===
1974

- **ABC Afterschool Specials** ("Rookie of the Year") (ABC)
- ABC Afterschool Specials ("My Dad Lives in a Downtown Hotel") (ABC)
- The Swiss Family Robinson (CBS)

1975

- **The CBS Festival of Lively Arts for Young People** ("Harlequinade") (CBS)
- The CBS Festival of Lively Arts for Young People ("What Makes a Gershwin Tune a Gershwin Tune?") (CBS)
- The CBS Festival of Lively Arts for Young People ("Ailey Celebrates Ellington") (CBS)

1976

- **The CBS Festival of Lively Arts for Young People** ("Danny Kaye's Look-In at the Metropolitan Opera") (CBS)
- The CBS Festival of Lively Arts for Young People ("What Is Noise and What Is Music?") (CBS)
- ABC Afterschool Specials ("It Must Be Love ('Cause I Feel So Dumb!)") (ABC)
- ABC Afterschool Specials ("Me and Dad's New Wife") (ABC)
- NBC Special Treat ("Papa and Me") (NBC)

1977

- **NBC Special Treat** ("Big Henry and the Polka Dot Kid") (NBC)
- ABC Afterschool Specials ("Francesca, Baby") (ABC)
- ABC Afterschool Specials ("Blind Sunday") (ABC)
- ABC Afterschool Specials ("P.J. and the President's Son") (ABC)
- The CBS Festival of Lively Arts for Young People ("The Original Rompin' Stompin' Hot And Heavy, Cool And Groove All Star Jazz Show") (CBS)
- NBC Special Treat ("Luke Was There") (NBC)

1978

- **ABC Afterschool Specials** ("Hewitt's Just Different") (ABC)
- ABC Afterschool Specials ("The Pinballs") (ABC)
- NBC Special Treat ("How The Beatles Changed The World") (NBC)
- NBC Special Treat ("A Piece Of Cake") (NBC)
- Once Upon a Classic ("Man From Nowhere") (PBS)
- Winners ("I Can") (CBS)
- Winners (Journey Together") (CBS)

1979

- **NBC Special Treat** ("The Tap Dance Kid") (NBC)
- ABC Afterschool Specials ("Make Believe Marriage") (ABC)
- ABC Afterschool Specials ("Mom And Dad Can't Hear Me") (ABC)
- CBS Afternoon Playhouse ("Joey And Redhawk") (CBS)
- NBC Special Treat ("Rodeo Red And The Runaway") (NBC)
- NBC Special Treat ("NYC Too Far From Tampa Blues") (NBC)

1980

- **ABC Afterschool Specials** ("The Late Great Me: Story of a Teenage Alcoholic") (ABC)
- Once Upon a Classic ("Chico the Rainmaker") (PBS)
- NBC Special Treat ("I Don't Know Who I Am") (NBC)
- NBC Special Treat ("The Rocking Chair Rebellion") (NBC)
- NBC Special Treat ("The House At 12 Rose Street") (NBC)

1981

- **ABC Afterschool Specials** ("A Matter of Time") (ABC)
- ABC Afterschool Specials ("A Family of Strangers") (ABC)
- CBS Afternoon Playhouse ("I Think I'm Having a Baby") (CBS)
- NBC Special Treat ("Sunshine's On The Way") (NBC)

1982

- **ABC Afterschool Specials** ("Starstruck") (ABC)
- CBS Afternoon Playhouse ("Me and Mr. Stenner") (CBS)

1983

- **ABC Afterschool Specials** ("The Woman Who Willed a Miracle") (ABC)
- CBS Afternoon Playhouse ("Help Wanted") (CBS)
- CBS Afternoon Playhouse ("Just Pals") (CBS)
- NBC Special Treat ("Oh, Boy! Babies!") (NBC)

1984

- **ABC Afterschool Specials** ("The Great Love Experiment") (ABC)
- NBC Special Treat ("He Makes Me Feel Like Dancin'") (NBC)
- ABC Afterschool Specials ("Andrea's Story: A Hitchhiking Tragedy") (ABC)
- CBS Afternoon Playhouse ("Revenge Of The Nerds") (CBS)

=== Outstanding Children's Informational Special ===
1976

- **Happy Anniversary, Charlie Brown** (CBS)
- What's It All About? ("What Are The Loch Ness And Other Monster's All About?") (CBS)
- ABC Afterschool Specials ("Winning and Losing: Diary of a Campaign") (ABC)

1977

- **ABC Afterschool Specials** ("My Mom's Having A Baby") (ABC)
- How to Follow the Campaign (ABC)

1978

- **ABC Afterschool Specials** ("Very Good Friends") (ABC)
- The CBS Festival of Lively Arts for Young People ("Henry Winkler Meets William Shakespeare") (CBS)

1979

- **Razzamatazz** (CBS)
- The CBS Festival of Lively Arts for Young People ("The Secret of Charles Dickens") (CBS)

1980

- **The CBS Festival of Lively Arts for Young People** ("Why a Conductor") (CBS)
- The CBS Festival of Lively Arts for Young People ("Make 'Em Laugh: A Young People's Comedy Concert") (CBS)

1981

- **The CBS Festival of Lively Arts for Young People** ("Julie Andrews' Invitation to the Dance with Rudolf Nureyev") (CBS)
- On the Level ("Side by Side - Prejudice") (PBS)

1982

- **Kathy** (PBS)
- The Body Human ("Becoming a Woman") (CBS)
- The Body Human ("Becoming a Man") (CBS)

1984

- **CBS Schoolbreak Special** ("Dead Wrong: The John Evans Story") (CBS)

=== Outstanding Children's Anthology/Dramatic Programming ===
1980

- **ABC Weekend Specials** ("The Gold Bug") (ABC)
- **Once Upon a Classic** ("Leatherstocking Tales") (PBS)
- **CBS Library** ("Once Upon a Midnight Dreary") (CBS)
- **CBS Library** ("Animal Talk") (CBS)
- ABC Weekend Specials ("The Revenge of Red Chief") (ABC)

=== Outstanding Children's Special ===
1985

- **CBS Schoolbreak Special** ( "All the Kids Do It") (CBS)
- ABC Afterschool Specials ("I Want to Go Home") (ABC)
- CBS Schoolbreak Special ("The Day the Senior Class Got Married") (CBS)
- CBS Schoolbreak Special ("Hear Me Cry") (CBS)

1986

- **CBS Schoolbreak Special** ("The War Between the Classes") (CBS)
- ABC Afterschool Specials ("Don't Touch") (ABC)
- CBS Schoolbreak Special ("Have You Tried Talking to Patty?") (CBS)
- CBS Schoolbreak Special ("Babies Having Babies") (CBS)

1987

- **ABC Afterschool Specials** ("Wanted: The Perfect Guy") (ABC)
- ABC Afterschool Specials ("Supermom's Daughter") (ABC)
- ABC Afterschool Specials ("Teen Father") (ABC)
- ABC Weekend Specials ("The Mouse and the Motorcycle") (ABC)

1988

- **CBS Schoolbreak Special** ("Never Say Goodbye") (CBS)
- ABC Afterschool Specials ("Just a Regular Kid: An AIDS Story") (ABC)
- ABC Afterschool Specials ("The Kid Who Wouldn't Quit: The Brad Silverman Story") (ABC)
- CBS Schoolbreak Special ("What If I'm Gay?") (CBS)

1989

- **ABC Afterschool Specials** ("Taking a Stand") (ABC)
- ABC Weekend Specials ("Runaway Ralph") (ABC)
- CBS Schoolbreak Special ("Gangs") (CBS)
- CBS Schoolbreak Special ("No Means No") (CBS)
- CBS Schoolbreak Special ("My Past Is My Own") (CBS)

1990

- **CBS Schoolbreak Special** ("A Matter of Conscience") (CBS)
- ABC Afterschool Specials ("A Town's Revenge") (ABC)
- Buy Me That! A Kids' Survival Guide to TV Advertising. (HBO)
- CBS Schoolbreak Special ("Flour Babies") (CBS)

1991

- **Lost in the Barrens** (Disney Channel)
- Lifestories: Families in Crisis ("Gunplay: The Last Day in the Life of Brian Darling") (HBO)
- ABC Weekend Specials ("Ralph S. Mouse") (ABC)
- Tales from the Whoop ("Hot Rod Brown Class Clown") (Nickelodeon)
- The Cropp Family Nature Album (Disney Channel)

1992

- **Vincent et moi** (Disney Channel)
- CBS Schoolbreak Special ("Abby, My Love") (CBS)
- First Love, Fatal Love (HBO)
- Lost in the Barrens II: The Curse of the Viking Grave (Disney Channel)
- Woof! (Disney Channel)

1993

- **ABC Afterschool Specials** ("Shades of a Single Protein") (ABC)
- ABC Weekend Specials ("CityKids") (ABC)
- Higher Goals (PBS)
- Lifestories: Families in Crisis ("Public Law 106: The Becky Bell Story") (HBO)
- CBS Schoolbreak Special ("Words Up!") (CBS)

1994

- **Lifestories: Families in Crisis** ("Dead Drunk: The Kevin Tunell Story") (HBO)
- ABC Afterschool Specials ("Girlfriend") (ABC)
- Lifestories: Families in Crisis ("More Than Friends: The Coming Out of Heidi Leiter") (HBO)
- CBS Schoolbreak Special ("Other Mothers") (CBS)
- Rhythm & Jam (ABC)

1995

- **Lifestories: Families in Crisis** ("A Child Betrayed: The Calvin Mire Story") (HBO)
- CBS Schoolbreak Special ("The Writing on the Wall") (CBS)
- Lifestories: Families in Crisis ("POWER: The Eddie Matos Story") (HBO)
- Nick News with Linda Ellerbee ("Space Shuttle, Phone Home") (Nickelodeon)
- CBS Schoolbreak Special ("Love in the Dark Ages") (CBS)

1996

- **CBS Schoolbreak Special** ("Stand Up") (CBS)
- ABC Afterschool Specials ("Positive: A Journey into AIDS") (ABC)
- CBS Schoolbreak Special ("Children Remember the Holocaust") (CBS)
- Eagle Scout: The Story of Henry Nicols (HBO)
- The Song Spinner (Showtime)

1997

- **Elmo Saves Christmas** (PBS)
- ABC Afterschool Specials ("Miracle at Trapper Creek") (ABC)
- Lifestories: Families in Crisis ("Someone Had to be Benny") (HBO)
- Family Video Diaries ("Brett Killed Mom: A Sister's Diary") (HBO)
- Family Video Diaries ("Bubbeh Lee and Me") (HBO)

1998

- **In His Father's Shoes** (Showtime)
- Assignment Discovery ("The Science of HIV") (Discovery Channel)
- Bong & Donnell (HBO)
- Letters from Africa (Disney Channel)
- The Royale (AMC)

1999

- **The Island on Bird Street** (Showtime)
- Edison: The Wizard of Light (HBO)
- Galileo: On the Shoulders of Giants (HBO)
- The Sweetest Gift (Showtime)
- The Tiger Woods Story (Showtime)

2000

- **Summer's End** (Showtime)
- The Devil's Arithmetic (Showtime)
- A Gift of Love: The Daniel Huffman Story (Showtime)
- Sea People (Showtime)
- Locked in Silence (Showtime)

2001

- **Run the Wild Fields** (Showtime)
- **A Storm in Summer** (Showtime)
- Ratz (Showtime)
- The Sandy Bottom Orchestra (Showtime)
- What Matters: 2001 Millennium Special (HBO)

2002

- **My Louisiana Sky** (Showtime)
- Off Season (Showtime)
- Snow in August (Showtime)
- They Call Me Sirr (Showtime)
- Walter and Henry (Showtime)

2003

- **Bang Bang You're Dead** (Showtime)
- Our America (Showtime)
- Table Talk ("Talking Beyond 9/11") (WAM!)
- ZOOM ("America's Kids Remember") (PBS)

=== Outstanding Children/Youth/Family Special ===
2004

- **The Incredible Mrs. Ritchie** (Showtime)
- Reality Matters ("Deadly Desires") (Discovery Channel)
- The Maldonado Miracle (Showtime)

2005

- **Mighty Times** ("The Legacy of Rosa Parks") (HBO)
- A Separate Peace (Showtime)

2006

- **Reality Matters** ("Teen Sexuality") (Discovery Channel)
- Saving a Species ("Sharks at Risk") (Discovery Channel)

2007

- **Saving a Species** ("The Great Penguin Rescue") (Discovery Kids)
- The Great Polar Bear Adventure (Discovery Kids)
- A Year on Earth (Discovery Kids)
