= Run the Wild Fields =

- Genre: drama
- Based on: And The Home of the Brave
- Written by: Rodney Patrick Vaccaro
- Screenplay by: Rodney Patrick Vaccaro
- Directed by: Paul A. Kaufman
- Starring: Joanne Whalley; Sean Patrick Flanery; Alexa Vega
- Music by: Laura Karpman
- Country of origin: United States
- Original language: English

Production
- Producers: Robert A. Halmi; Paul A. Kaufman; Paul Rauch
- Cinematography: Thom Best
- Editor: Susan R. Crutcher
- Running time: 101 minutes
- Production companies: FilmRise; Paul Rauch/Kaufman Company

Original release
- Network: Showtime
- Release: March 5, 2000

Run the Wild Fields is an American drama television movie that premiered in 2000. Released as a Showtime Original Movie, it was based on the play And The Home of the Brave by Rodney Vaccaro.

== Premise ==
In the spring of 1945, young mother Ruby and her 10-year-old daughter, Pug, live on a small farm in North Carolina. Frank (Ruby's husband and Pug's father) is fighting in World War II and has been missing in action for three years in the Pacific. Ruby, believing he is still alive, leaves everything just as it is and will not farm the fields or sell Frank’s car.

Pug discovers Tom, a drifter whose leg was injured in a dog attack. Ruby brings him into the house for treatment, despite the concerns of their neighbor, Silas. Tom quickly recovers and decides to move on. Ruby gifts him some items, including Frank's old jacket.

Before he can leave town, Tom is arrested for vagrancy and suspected theft. Ruby comes to his defense and, to avoid a vagrancy charge, she hires Tom as a farm hand and lets him live in a large shed on the property. Silas investigates further and informs Ruby that Tom spent two years in jail and is a draft dodger. Despite these revelations, she continues to employ him. Ruby, Tom, and Pug clear the fields and ready them for planting. Tom acts in a fatherly manner towards Pug by taking her fishing, celebrating her 11th birthday, and teaching her how to dance. Meanwhile, Silas harbors romantic feelings for Ruby and sees Tom as a rival.

Bullies at Pug’s school start spreading rumors that Tom is a coward and a Nazi sympathizer. At a party, Tom is harassed by a group of young men, whom he refuses to fight. Ruby praises his restraint, but Pug worries that he may truly be a coward. Later that night, Tom reveals to Ruby that his younger brother fought and died in the Spanish Civil War, and the loss has left him disillusioned.

Pug receives a letter that she hides from her mother. The media announces that WWII has ended, to everyone’s excitement. During a town celebration, Pug gathers the bullies in a shed to try to convince them that Tom is a brave man by telling tall tales. Meanwhile, Silas aggressively insists Ruby should be with him. Tom intervenes and punches Silas. Tom immediately regrets doing so, and Silas expresses remorse for his own bad behavior.

The shed catches on fire, trapping Pug and one of the boys inside, and Tom risks his life to save them. It's revealed to the townsfolk that Tom fought alongside his brother for the Republican faction in the Spanish Civil War. Privately, Ruby and Tom admit to having romantic feelings for one another, but they hesitate to go further.

Tom discovers the letter that Pug hid; it's from Frank saying that he is healthy and coming home. She tearfully says she wants Tom to stay and be her father. However, he leaves and plans to go back to his own home. Frank returns to the farm and is happily reunited with his family. An adult Pug reflects, in voice-over, about the positive impact Tom had upon her life, however briefly she knew him.

== Cast ==
- Joanne Whalley as Ruby Miller
- Sean Patrick Flanery as Tom Walker
- Cotter Smith as Silas Green
- Alexa Vega as Opal "Pug" Miller
- Bill Lake as Sheriff Bob
- Aaron Ashmore as Charlie Upshall
- David Nerman as Frank Miller
- Deborah R. Sullivan as Adult Pug Narrator

and others.

== Awards ==
- 2001: Daytime Emmy Awards: Outstanding Directing in a Children's Special - Paul A. Kaufman
- 2001: Daytime Emmy Awards: Outstanding Children's Special - Paul Rauch, Paul A. Kaufman, Robert Halmi Jr. and Rodney Patrick Vaccaro
- 2001: Daytime Emmy Awards: Outstanding Writing in a Children's Special - Rodney Patrick Vaccaro (Nominated)
- 2001: Young Artist Awards: Best Performance in a TV Movie (Drama)-Leading Young Actress - Alexa Vega (Nominated)
- 2001: Young Artist Awards: Best Family TV Movie/Pilot/Mini-Series-Cable - Run the Wild Fields(Nominated)
