= Once Upon a Classic =

American television series

- Presented by: Bill Bixby
- Country of origin: United States

Production
- Production company: WQED

Original release
- Network: PBS
- Release: October 9, 1976 – September 1980

Once Upon a Classic is an American television program hosted by Bill Bixby that aired on PBS from 1976 to 1980 as a production of WQED in Pittsburgh.

The episodes consisted of adaptations of such classic literature as A Connecticut Yankee in King Arthur's Court (which won a Peabody Award), Leatherstocking Tales, The Talisman, and The Prince and the Pauper; some of these adaptations were produced by other broadcasters such as the BBC and ITV in the United Kingdom. There were also some original teleplays.
