= Zoom (1999 TV series) =

- Created by: Christopher Sarson
- Developed by: WGBH Boston
- Opening theme: "Come On and Zoom"
- Ending theme: "Send It to Zoom" (Seasons 1–2 and 7) "Come On and Zoom" (instrumental) "Send Us Z-Mail" (seasons 3–6)
- Composer: Manic Moose
- Country of origin: United States
- Original language: English
- No. of seasons: 7
- No. of episodes: 204

Production
- Executive producer: Kate Taylor
- Producers: Jonathan Meath; Alan Catello Grazioso
- Running time: 28 minutes
- Production company: WGBH-TV

Original release
- Network: PBS (1999); PBS Kids (1999–2005); PBS Kids Go! (2004–2005)
- Release: January 4, 1999 – May 6, 2005

Related
- Zoom (1972 TV series)

Zoom (stylized as ZOOM) is an American live-action children's television series in which child cast members present a variety of types of content, including games, recipes, science experiments, and short plays, based on ideas sent in by children, and is a remake of the 1972 television program of the same name. Created by Christopher Sarson, the series ran on PBS Kids and later PBS Kids Go! from January 4, 1999 to May 6, 2005, with reruns airing until September 2, 2007, and was produced by WGBH-TV in Boston.

== Premise ==
Zoom premiered in 1999 in largely the same format as the original series, with many of the same games and continued to feature content and ideas submitted by viewers. This second Zoom series ran for seven seasons (1999–2005), each hosted by seven children—32 in total—called "Zoomers". It completed taping a pilot episode in September 1995 with a different cast, which was circulated among funders by early 1997 and aired on television in November of that year. On December 9, 2004, it was announced that the show would be cancelled after seven seasons. The cancellation was attributed to the rising competition of children's television, which resulted in a noticeable decline in ratings for the show. The series finale aired on May 6, 2005 on most PBS member stations, without any reference of the show's ending. Reruns of the final three seasons aired on some PBS stations until fall 2007, when the show was pulled from the PBS lineup entirely.

In 2020, as part of programming made in response to the COVID-19 pandemic, several members of the now-adult Zoom cast from both the 1999 and 1972 series reunited for ZOOM Into Action, a series of videos produced by the performers in their own homes where they recreated some of their educational activities for their grown-up audience to share with their own children at home. The project was spearheaded by former Zoom cast member Pablo Velez, Jr. who now serves as WGBH's Director of Licensing and Business Development.

== Season overview ==
Season	Episodes	Originally aired (U.S. dates)	
Season	Episodes	First aired	Last aired
1	42	January 4, 1999	April 19, 1999
2	40	January 4, 2000	April 24, 2000
3	41	January 1, 2001	April 11, 2001
4	21	January 25, 2002	June 7, 2002
5	20	March 31, 2003	July 18, 2003
6	20	April 19, 2004	June 7, 2004
7	20	April 4, 2005	May 6, 2005

== Cast members ==
ZOOM	Cast member 1	Cast member 2	Cast member 3	Cast member 4	Cast member 5	Cast member 6	Cast member 7
Pilot (1995)	Enid	Marcus	Hayley	Esther	Daniel	Georgina	Chad
Season 1 (1999)	Zoe Costello	Jared Nathan	Keiko Yoshida	Pablo Velez Jr.	Alisa Besher	David Toropov	Lynese Browder
Season 2 (2000)	Ray MacMore	Caroline Botelho	Claudio Jimenez	Alisa Besher	Jessie Ogungbadero	Kenny Yates	Zoe Costello
Season 3 (2001)	Frances Domond	Kenny Yates	Rachel Redd	Eric Rollins	Kaleigh Cronin	Kevin "Buzz" Barrette	Caroline Botelho
Season 4 (2002)	Aline Barta	Garrett DiBona	Rachel Redd	Matt Gornstein	Estuardo Alvizures	Kaleigh Cronin	Caroline Botelho
Season 5 (2003)	Caroline Botelho	Aline Barta	Estuardo Alvizures	Garrett DiBona	Mike Hansen	Kortney Sumner	Elena "Shing Ying" Shieh
Season 6 (2004)	Mike Hansen	Kortney Sumner	Francesco Tena	Cara Harvey	Kyle Larrow	Maya Morales	Elena "Shing Ying" Shieh
Season 7 (2005)	Nick Henry	Taylor Garron	Francesco Tena	Noreen Raja	Emily Marshall	Kyle Larrow	Elena "Shing Ying" Shieh

== Segments ==
- ZOOMsci: Experiments to explore. Sometimes this segment features brain teasers or observation surveys which call for viewers to send in results.
- ZOOMalong: (season 1) Activities that viewers are encouraged to participate in along with the cast in real time. Some episodes featuring this have a cold opening prompting viewers to prepare specific materials in advance.
- ZOOMphenom: (seasons 2–3, 5–7) Observations or phenomenon discoveries.
- ZOOMzinger: Challenges or interesting tricks viewers share.
- ZOOMdo: Creative handicrafts or activities.
- ZOOMgame: Games and activities that are fun for a group. Zoomers sometimes form teams to compete with each other in relay races.
- CafeZOOM and ZOOM Znack: Simple recipes to make.
- ZOOMplayhouse: Skits and dramas by viewers (and, occasionally, original productions) and portrayed by the Zoomers.
- ZOOMchat: Discussion on topics involving children's issues or questions from viewers.
- Zmail: Sharing of fan mail and answering questions from viewers.
- ZOOM Reviews Books (seasons 3–5): Book reviews recommended by viewers (and occasionally, cast members).
- WhatZup: Interviews from children that answer interesting questions.
- ZOOMvid: (seasons 1–5) Home videos and short films made by viewers.
- ZOOMguest: Special feature of children with unique talents or hobbies.
- ZOOMA Cum Laude (seasons 1–2) and ZOOM Into Action (seasons 3–7) pay tribute to children who accomplished some tremendous feat and volunteered in the community or did charitable deeds, respectively.
- Zoops: Viewers share their embarrassing moments. (Seasons 1–3) Blooper clips are sometimes shown here. (The embarrassing moments were dropped after season 3 in favor of the exclusive exhibition of blooper clips from seasons 4–7, although the blooper clips had also been featured since season 2.)
- Fannee Doolee: A segment that centered on a character who likes any person, place, thing or concept with double letters in it but hates its non-double-lettered equivalent.
- Ubbi Dubbi: Short skits that uses Ubbi Dubbi (adding the "ub" in every vowel sound in English.) Occasionally this segment is done like an advertisement.
- ZOOM Tale(s) (seasons 1–5) Original stories written and illustrated by viewers.
- Zoom Out (Season 6) and Zoom in On (Season 7): A focus on individual cast members in turn and their lives and hobbies outside of Zoom.
- ZOOM '70s Flashback (season 7): A clip from the original 1972 series.

== Merchandise ==
Although the complete series was never released in any format, four video cassettes were released based on the show:

1. Party with Zoom (June 22, 1999, ISBN 157807200X)
2. The Zoomers Video Special: The Making of ZOOM! (June 22, 1999)
3. Zoom: America Kids Respond (October 9, 2001)
4. Zoom: America's Kids Remember (October 8, 2002)

Additionally, a two-disc set with four full episodes plus various footage from all six seasons of the 1970s version was released on October 28, 2008.

Four books by Amy E. Sklansky compiled from material submitted by viewers were published by Little, Brown and Company:

- Zoom Zingers (1999, ISBN 0316952613)
- Zoom Fun With Friends (1999, ISBN 0316952753)
- Zoomdos You Can Do! (2000, ISBN 0316952761)
- Zoomfun Outside (2000, ISBN 0316952788)

== See also ==
- Fetch! with Ruff Ruffman
- Design Squad
