= Antonio Sabàto Jr. =

American actor (born 1972)

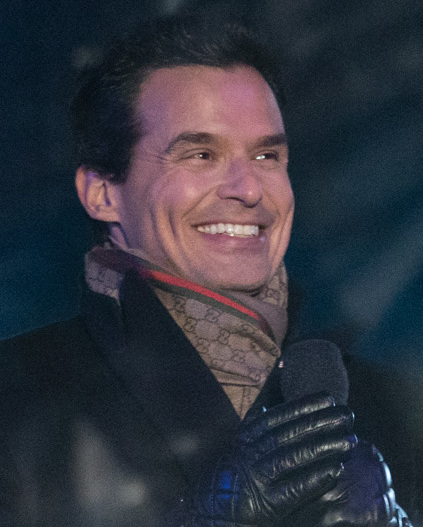
- Sabàto in 2018
- Born: February 29, 1972 (age 54); Rome, Italy
- Occupations: Actor, model, politician
- Years active: 1990–present
- Political party: Republican
- Spouses: Alicia Tully Jensen (m. 1992; div. 1993); Cheryl Nunes (m. 2012; div. 2018)
- Partners: Virginia Madsen (1993–1998); Kristin Rossetti (2000–2007)
- Children: 3
- Parent(s): Antonio Sabàto Sr. Yvonne Kabouchy

Antonio Sabàto Jr. (born February 29, 1972) is an American model and actor. Born in Italy, he rose to fame in the 1990s as an underwear model for Calvin Klein and playing Jagger Cates on the soap opera General Hospital from 1992 to 1995, and as Jack Parezi on Melrose Place from 1995‒1996. By the early 2000s, most of his acting credits were guest appearances, reality television, and low budget films. Sabàto ran unsuccessfully as the Republican candidate for U.S. Congress against incumbent Democratic Congresswoman Julia Brownley for California's 26th district in the 2018 elections.

== Early life ==
Sabàto was born in Rome, Italy on February 29, 1972, a Leap Day. His father was Antonio Sabàto Sr., an Italian-born film star. His mother, Yvonne, was born in Prague (then part of Czechoslovakia), and of Jewish ancestry; her own mother was a Jewish Holocaust survivor. He has one sibling, a sister named Simonne. Sabàto and his family moved to the United States from Italy in 1985 and he became a naturalized citizen of the United States in 1996. He received his high school diploma from Palisades Charter High School in Los Angeles. His parents divorced, and his mother remarried, to California-based businessman George F. Kabouchy, in 1997.

== Career ==
=== Modeling ===
Sabàto was featured on the cover of erotic magazine Playgirl in April 1993. Represented in Los Angeles by fashion agent Omar Albertto, Sabàto first gained attention as a Calvin Klein underwear model in 1996. In 1990, he appeared in Janet Jackson's "Love Will Never Do (Without You)" music video along with actor Djimon Hounsou, who is also a former CK underwear model represented by Albertto. In 2013, Sabàto was named the international celebrity spokesperson for AnastasiaDate, an online mail-order bride website which connects wealthy American older men with Eastern European women.

=== Acting ===
Moving into acting, from 1992 to 1995, Sabàto appeared on the soap opera General Hospital, the science fiction series Earth 2, and the prime time soap opera Melrose Place. Throughout the late 1990s, he starred in various TV movies and direct-to-video films, as well as a supporting role in the 1998 feature film The Big Hit. In 2003, he played the protagonist's lover Pablo in the movie Testosterone, filmed in Argentina with Sonia Braga, David Sutcliffe, Jennifer Coolidge, Celina Font and Leonardo Brezicki. From 2005 to 2006, Sabàto played Dante Damiano on the daytime soap opera The Bold and the Beautiful, and in 2008, Sabàto reprised his role as Jagger Cates on the second season of General Hospital: Night Shift. Sabàto made an appearance on Bones as a bouncer from a Jersey Shore club in season 6, episode 3, "The Maggots in the Meathead" in 2010. In 2013, he played Father Zaragosa in the television series The League. Sabàto was set to direct, produce, and star in an upcoming project called Trail Blazers, which reportedly was the first in the line of other films he hoped to produce for his upcoming film studio called Trail Blazers Pictures. The film was to costar Kristy Swanson, Kevin Sorbo, Dean Cain, and Scott Baio.

=== Other work ===
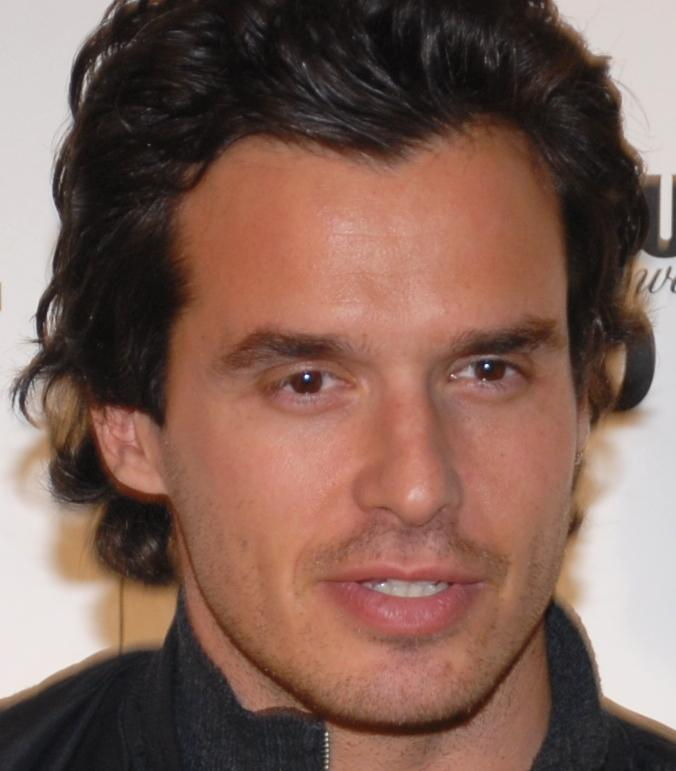
Sabàto in 2007

In 2005, Sabàto appeared on But Can They Sing?, a celebrity reality singing competition on VH1, coming in 5th place. He competed in the 2008 NBC competition Celebrity Circus, which he won. He stated on the show that both his mother and her father were circus performers.

In August 2009, Sabàto starred in My Antonio, a reality show on VH1 in which female contestants competed to win his heart. The show notably featured Sabàto's ex-wife, Tully Jensen, as one of the contestants (she came in third place), and his mother also appeared on the show, providing advice. The show's winner was Brooke Barlow.

Sabàto and his family appeared on ABC's Celebrity Wife Swap on January 31, 2012. His then-fiancé Cheryl Moana Marie Nunes traded places on the show with WWE wrestler Mick Foley's wife Colette Foley. Sabàto competed on season 19 of Dancing with the Stars in 2014. He was paired with professional dancer Cheryl Burke, and they finished in 8th place.

Since 2014, Sabàto has served as the host of a 30-minute long syndicated home remodeling show Fix It & Finish It.

In 2016, Sabàto was contracted to be a Chippendales dancer for a special engagement in June at the Rio All Suite Hotel and Casino in Las Vegas.

Sabàto announced that he wants to start a Hollywood movie studio geared toward conservative content. The new company is called Trail Blazers Pictures and the studio's first upcoming film, Trail Blazers, is in the works for a release in 2022.

On April 25, 2024, while in Australia Sabato filmed the Music Video for Australian Singer Songwriter Kristin Venae's Single 'Still Here'. The Music video was released on Valentines day 2025.

== Politics ==
Sabàto ran for the 26th district Congressional seat in California as a Republican against incumbent Democrat Julia Brownley. He came in second place in the jungle primary with 22.4% of the vote, advancing to face Brownley in the general election. He lost the election on November 6, 2018, by 24%.

Regarding illegal immigration, Sabàto said, "There should be no shortcuts for those who don't want to pay or wait". He supported Trump's wall on the border with Mexico to impede illegal crossings, saying, "We need a wall."

Sabàto has made many controversial statements regarding former U.S. President Barack Obama, including saying he has "no guts," accusing him of destroying the U.S. economy, and asserting that Obama should be arrested and sent to the Guantanamo Bay detention camp. Sabàto also implied objections to Obama’s policies is the reason he left the Democratic Party.

For several years, Sabàto has maintained that, in his opinion, Obama is not a Christian but a Muslim. The first instance of such a claim came in 2016, when Sabàto, after making a speech at the Republican National Convention, told ABC News "I don't believe he follows the God that I love and the Jesus that I love," and "If you follow his story, if you read his book, if you understand about Obama, I mean, that's not a Christian name, is it?" When pressed for evidence to back up his claims, Sabàto answered that it's "in his heart."

Two years later, in 2018, he reaffirmed his belief that Obama is a Muslim when appearing on The View, saying "If he's [Obama's] not a Muslim, we should call him President Barry," and claimed that "What I was saying was, he changed his name to Obama because he followed the Islam religion when he was growing up so, I felt that once you're in that religion, you stay for the rest of your life."

Sabàto endorsed Donald Trump for president in 2016. He spoke at the 2016 Republican National Convention in support of the party's presumptive nominee. Sabàto claimed that after he expressed his support for Trump, he was blacklisted from Hollywood. He later compared his struggle to find work in show business with that of being Jewish during the Holocaust and said celebrities mocked him on the social media website Twitter.

== Personal life ==
Sabàto was married to Tully Jensen from 1992 until 1993. He married Cheryl Moana Marie Nunes in 2012. The two separated in December 2016 and their divorce was finalized in June 2018. After Sabàto filed for divorce, Nunes alleged that Sabàto was abusing prescription drugs and had failed to complete even one month of a three-month-long drug rehabilitation program. Sabàto said that he was addicted to prescription sleep aids, not benzodiazepines as Nunes claimed, but admitted that he had a problem with substance abuse in the past, specifically crystal meth. Sabàto has three children: a son with Virginia Madsen, a daughter with Kristin Rossetti Biasi, and a son with Nunes.

Sabàto is a Christian but has, on several occasions, said that he also identifies as being Jewish.

Sabàto had testosterone pellets injected into his buttocks as a treatment for low levels of testosterone. Sabàto has several tattoos, including the Batman logo on his lower back and the yin yang symbol surrounded by Chinese characters on his arm.

In a December 2018 tweet, Sabàto stated that he and his family were in the process of moving out of California to an undisclosed state, citing his frustration with the state's progressive policies as the primary reason. In March 2020, Sabàto moved to Florida, and now works for a construction company.

== Filmography ==
=== Film ===
Year	Title	Role	Notes
1990	Il ragazzo delle mani d'acciaio	Kevin Foster	
1991	Fuga da Kayenta	Emiliano	
1991	...Se non avessi l'amore	Pier Giorgio Frassati	TV movie
1993	Moment of Truth: Why My Daughter?	A.J. Treece	TV movie
1994	Jailbreakers	Tony Falcon	TV movie
1995	Her Hidden Truth	Detective Matt Samoni	TV movie
1996	If Looks Could Kill	John Hawkins	TV movie
1996	Padre papà	Don Giuseppe	TV movie
1996	Thrill	Jack Colson	TV movie
1996	Code Name: Wolverine	Harry Gordini/Wolverine	TV movie
1997	Circles	Jeremy Bonner	
1998	The Perfect Getaway	Randy Savino	TV movie
1998	The Big Hit	Vince	
1998	High Voltage	Johnny Clay	
1999	Fatal Error	Dr. Nick Baldwin	TV movie
1999	Goosed	Dr. Steven Stevenson	
2000	The Chaos Factor	Jack Poynt	
2000	Vola Sciusciù	Tony	TV movie
2000	Guilty as Charged	Sergeant Hawks	TV movie
2000	Final Ascent	David	TV movie
2001	Mindstorm	Dan Oliver	
2001	Shark Hunter	Spencer Northcut	
2001	Longshot	Tommy Sutton	
2002	Hyper Sonic	Grant Irvine	Video
2002	Seconds to Spare	Paul Blake	TV movie
2002	Dead Above Ground	Sergeant Dan DeSousa	
2003	See Jane Date	Timothy Rommelly	TV movie
2003	Wasabi Tuna	Fredrico	
2003	Bugs	Matt Pollack	TV movie
2003	Testosterone	Pablo Alesandro	
2005	Jane Doe: Til Death Do Us Part	Joey Angelini	TV movie
2005	Crash Landing	Major John Masters	
2006	Deadly Skies	Richard Donovan	TV movie
2007	Stolen Life	Greg Vlasi	TV movie
2007	Destination: Infestation	Ethan Hart	TV movie
2007	Sirens of the Caribbean	Michael Pace	TV movie
2008	Ghost Voyage	Michael	TV movie
2009	Drifter: Henry Lee Lucas	Henry Lee Lucas	
2009	Princess of Mars	John Carter	
2011	Balls to the Wall	Sven	
2011	God Reschedules Rapture	-	Short
2011	Secrets from Her Past	Dr. Shawn Tessle	TV movie
2012	The Three Stooges	Handsome Guy #1	
2012	Little Women, Big Cars	A.J.	
2012	Little Women, Big Cars 2	A.J.	
2014	All I Want for Christmas	Mike Patterson	TV movie
2015	Intikam	Varol	
2016	Dark Paradise	Dario	TV movie
2016	Inspired to Kill	Paul	TV movie
2017	Hometown Hero	Jason	TV movie
2019	Dance Night Obsession	Miguel	
2019	Santa in Training	Eddie	
2020	One Nation Under God	Senator Viera	
2021	God's Not Dead: We the People	Mike McKinnon	
2021	Carolina's Calling	Martin Haas	
2022	Trail Blazers	John	

=== Television ===
Year	Title	Role	Notes
1992–1995	General Hospital	Jagger Cates	Regular Cast
1994–1995	Earth 2	Alonzo Solace	Main Cast
1995	Melrose Place	Jack Parezi	Recurring Cast: Season 4
1996	Lois & Clark: The New Adventures of Superman	Bob Stanford	Episode: "Bob and Carol and Lois and Clark"
1997	Happily Ever After: Fairy Tales for Every Child	Mario (voice)	Episode: "Thumbelina"
1999	Ally McBeal	Kevin Wyatt	Episode: "The Green Monster"
1999	Wasteland	Jack	Episode: "Double Date"
1999	Tribe	Jack Osborne	Main Cast
2000	The Outer Limits	Chad Warner/Sid Camden	Episode: "Skin Deep"
2000	Charmed	Bane Jessup	Recurring Cast: Season 2
2001	The Test	Himself/Panelist	Episode: "The Sex Etiquette Test"
2001	Wild On!	Bane Jessup	Episode: "Wild on the Islands"
2003	Pet Star	Himself/Panelist	Episode: "Episode #2.10 & "#2.13"
2003	E! True Hollywood Story	Himself	Episode: "Melrose Place"
2004	MTV Cribs	Himself	Episode: "September 22, 2004"
2004	Half & Half	Carlo	Episode: "The Big Double Date with My Mate Episode"
2004	Becker	Linda's Boyfriend	Episode: "DNR"
2004	The Help	Dwayne	Main Cast
2005	But Can They Sing?	Himself/Contestant	Main Cast
2005	Joey	Kyle	Episode: "Joey and the Tonight Show"
2005‒06	The Bold and the Beautiful	Dante Damiano	Regular Cast
2006	E! True Hollywood Story	Himself	Episode: "Tori Spelling"
2008	Celebrity Circus	Himself/Contestant	Main Cast
2008	Whatever Happened To?	Himself	Episode: "Playboys"
2008	General Hospital: Night Shift	Jagger Cates	Main Cast: Season 2
2008	NCIS	Dale Kapp	Episode: "Road Kill"
2009	My Antonio	Himself	Main Cast
2009	Ugly Betty	Himself	Episode: "The Fall Issue"
2009	Scrubs	Himself	Episode: "Our Drunk Friend"
2010	Iron Chef America	Himself/Judge	Episode: "Flay vs. Smith: Avocado"
2010	CSI: NY	Davi Santos	Episode: "The Formula"
2010	The Tonight Show with Jay Leno	Ross Matthews	Episode: "Episode #18.89"
2010	Rizzoli & Isles	Jorge	Episode: "I Kissed A Girl"
2010	Bones	Terror	Episode: "The Maggots in the Meathead"
2011	The Traveler's Guide to Life	Himself	Episode: "Secret Lives"
2011	After Lately	Himself	Episode: "Finding Jordan"
2011	Hot in Cleveland	Leandro	Episode: "Dancing Queens"
2012	Celebrity Wife Swap	Himself	Episode: "Mick 'Mankind' Foley/Antonio Sabato Jr."
2012	Femme Fatales	Bart	Episode: "Gun Twisted"
2013	Hell's Kitchen	Himself/Restaurant Patron	Episode: "5 Chefs Compete: Part 3 of 3"
2013	Stars in Danger: The High Dive	Himself/Contestant	
2013	Chopped	Himself/Contestant	Episode: "Celebrity Holiday Bash"
2013	Baby Daddy	Gerard	Episode: "All's Flair in Love and War"
2013	Castle	Ramon Russo	Episode: "Need to Know"
2013	The League	Father Zaragosa	Recurring Cast: Season 5
2013‒14	From the Mouths of Babes	Himself	Recurring Guest: Season 1
2014	Oprah: Where Are They Now?	Himself	Episode: "Candy Spelling, Knots Landing Reunion/Antonio Sabato, Jr."
2014	Dancing with the Stars	Himself/Contestant	Contestant: Season 19
2014	Heartbreakers	Billy Mac Fleming	Episode: "Shot Through The Heart"
2014–2016	Fix It and Finish It	Himself/Host	Main Host
2016	Cupcake Wars	Himself/Contestant	Episode: "Celebrity: Twister"
2016	The Encounter	Dr. Max Huber	Episode: "Just Believe"
2017	Malibu Dan the Family Man	Frane Calloway	Episode: Filthy Poor
2017–2018	Hilton Head Island	Jude Trisk	Main Cast

=== Music videos ===
Year	Song	Artist
1990	"Love Will Never Do (Without You)"	Janet Jackson

== See also ==
- List of male underwear models
