= Shawn Christian =

American actor

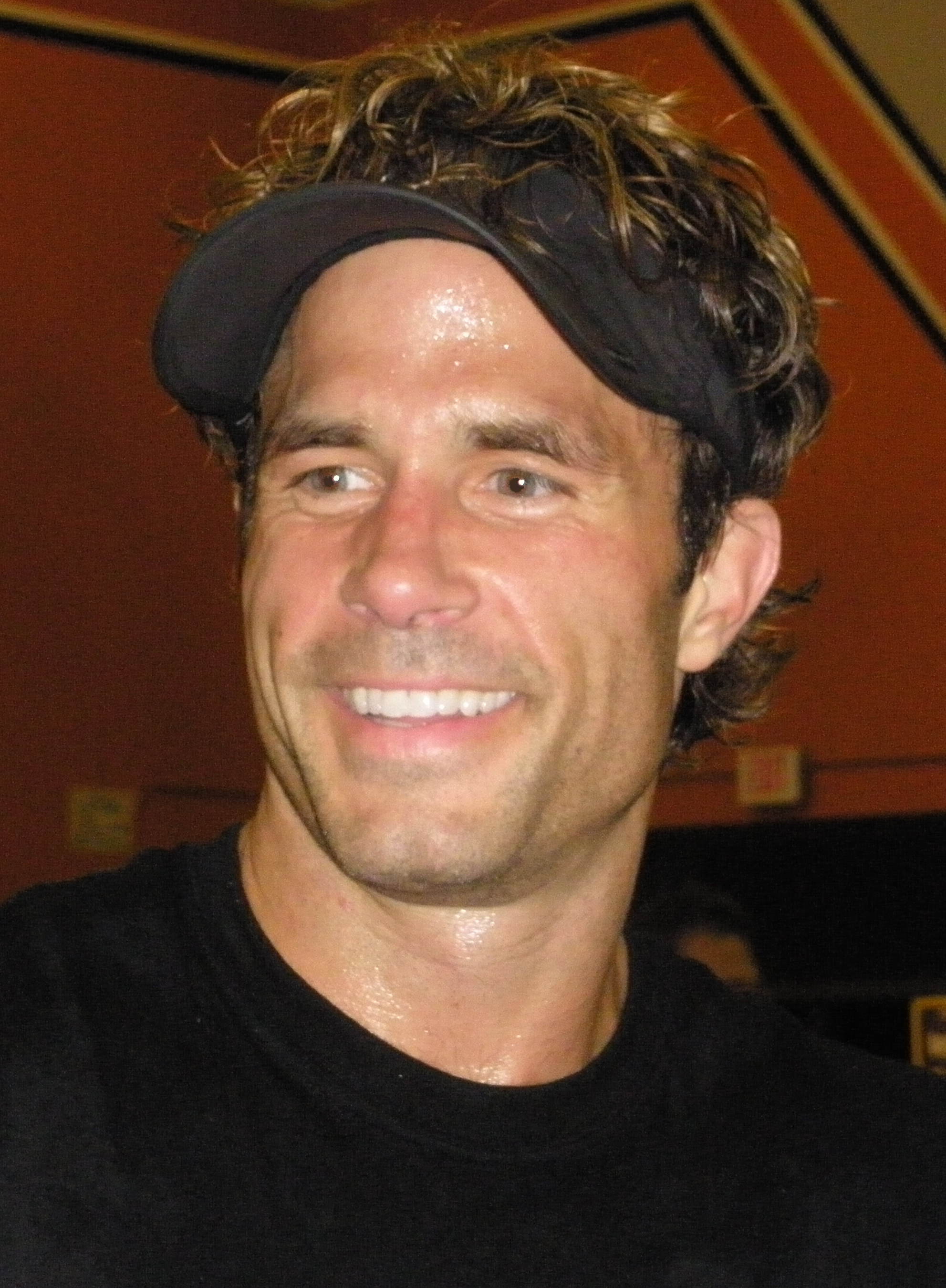
- Christian in 2009
- Born: Shawn Patrick Christian; December 18, 1965 (age 60); Grand Rapids, Michigan, U.S.
- Occupation: Actor
- Years active: 1994–present
- Spouse(s): Deborah Quinn (m. 1996; div. 2013) Arianne Zucker (m. 2024)
- Children: 1

Shawn Patrick Christian (born December 18, 1965) is an American television and film actor. He began his career playing the role of Mike Kasnoff on the soap opera As the World Turns (1993-97) and later moved to prime time television playing recurring roles on Charmed, Beverly Hills, 90210 and Birds of Prey. He starred in the 2001 monster film Tremors 3: Back to Perfection and the WB drama series, Summerland (2004-2005). He later returned to daytime television playing Daniel Jonas on Days of Our Lives (2008-2017, 2020).

== Early life ==
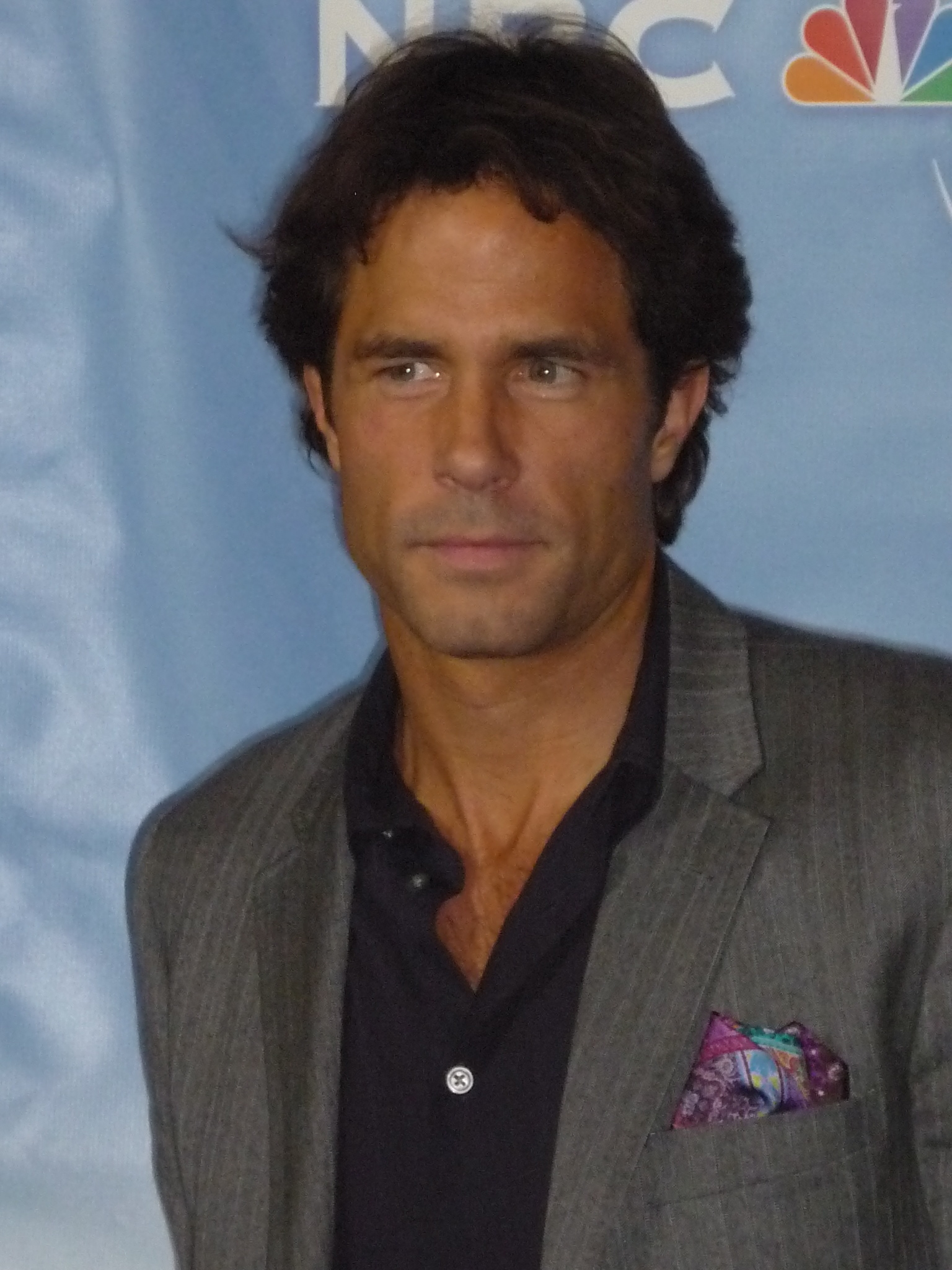
Christian in 2011

Christian was born in Grand Rapids, Michigan. After graduating from Ferris State University in Big Rapids, Michigan, in 1989 with a degree in marketing, he moved to Chicago to pursue an acting career. He starred in numerous stage productions and began appearing in commercials. He promptly moved to Chicago to pursue an acting career, and worked on stage with improvisational company Improv Olympic.

== Career ==
In 1994, Christian was the first male spokesman on Star Search. Later that year, he landed his first television role as Mike Kasnoff on the CBS daytime soap opera, As the World Turns. In 1995, he was nominated for "Hottest Male Star" by Soap Opera Digest Awards. He starred on the show until 1997 before moving to Los Angeles. In 1997, he made his primetime television debut playing a recurring role on the short-lived Fox series, Pacific Palisades produced by Aaron Spelling. He later guest-starred on sitcoms Ellen, Malcolm & Eddie, Men Behaving Badly and Step by Step.

In 1998, Christian starred alongside Bo Derek in the NBC primetime soap opera, Wind on Water. The series was cancelled after only two episodes aired. In 1999, he had a recurring roles in The WB fantasy series Charmed as Josh, the love interest of Piper Halliwell, played by Holly Marie Combs, and in the Fox teen drama Beverly Hills, 90210 as Wayne Moses during its ninth season. He also made appearances on Love Boat: The Next Wave, Pensacola: Wings of Gold, V.I.P., CSI: Crime Scene Investigation, Crossing Jordan, Spin City, The Drew Carey Show, Becker and Friends as Rachel Green's doctor Schiff. In 2000, Christian made his big scree debut in the comedy-drama Beautiful directed by Sally Field, and the following year played male lead in the monster horror film Tremors 3: Back to Perfection.

From 2002 to 2003, Christian starred as Wade Brixton in the WB superhero series, Birds of Prey. From 2004 to 2005 he starred alongside Lori Loughlin in the WB drama series, Summerland. In 2002, he also portrayed the role of Ross Rayburn in the soap opera One Life to Live. In 2005 he had a recurring role in the ABC legal comedy drama Boston Legal, and the following year appeared as potential cowboy boyfriend of Jack in an episode of the final season of Will & Grace. He also had recurring roles on Las Vegas and Runaway (2006 TV series). In film, Christian appeared in 50 Ways to Leave Your Lover (2004), For Your Consideration (2006), Meet Dave (2008) and Small Town Saturday Night (2010). He also had male leading roles in the made-for-television movies Red Skies (2002), Undercover Christmas (2003), Murder in the Hamptons (2005), The Last Chance (2008) and Secrets of the Mountain (2010).

In 2008, Christian returned to daytime playing doctor Daniel Jonas on the NBC soap opera, Days of Our Lives. He left the soap in 2017. From 2017 to 2018 he played Alan Mills in the Freeform drama series, Famous in Love. He later appeared in Lifetime movies Hidden Truth (2016), Unwritten Obsession (2017), Mommy Be Mine (2018), Instakiller (2018), Dangerous Cheaters (2022), and the Hallmark Channel's Silent Witness (2019) and Love in the Sun (2019).

== Personal life ==
Christian married Deborah Quinn on May 18, 1996. The couple met in 1991 while they were both auditioning for a print ad in Chicago. They have a son Kameron (born in 2000), who produces music. Christian's stepdaughter is actress Taylor Cole. The two acted together in the television series Summerland and the Hallmark Channel made-for-tv film Ruby Herring Mysteries: Silent Witness. Christian and Quinn divorced in 2013.

On August 5, 2020, Shawn confirmed on The Locher Room show that he and Days of Our Lives star Arianne Zucker have been dating for several years. Since 28 June 2021, they have been engaged, and were married on August 17, 2024.

== Filmography ==
=== Film ===
Year	Title	Role	Notes
2000	Beautiful	Wink Hendricks	
2001	Tremors 3: Back to Perfection	Jack "Desert Jack" Sawyer	Direct-to-video
2004	50 Ways to Leave Your Lover	Rory	
2006	For Your Consideration	Pilgrim Man	
2008	Meet Dave	Lieutenant Left Arm	
2008	Mating Dance	Ken	
2009	Only One Can Play	Alex	Short film
2010	Small Town Saturday Night	Tommy Carson	
2013	Spanners	Adam Parr	
2016	Hidden Truth	Michael	
2016	Savannah Sunrise	Phil	
2018	Last Seen in Idaho	Lance	
2018	U.Z.L.A.	Professor Suber	
2018	Instakiller	Derek	
2019	The Experience	Peter Evans	
2025	College of the Dead	Professor Suber	
2025	Pursued	Tom	

=== Television ===
Year	Title	Role	Notes
1994–1997	As the World Turns	Mike Kasnoff	
1997	Pacific Palisades	Quinn Ragowski	3 episodes
1997	Ellen	Danny	Episode: "Gay Yellow Pages"
1997	Malcolm & Eddie	Trevor	Episode: "Dream Racer"
1997	Team Knight Rider	Adam Galbreth	Episode: "Inside Traitor"
1997	Men Behaving Badly	The Plumber	Episode: "Special Delivery"
1998	Step by Step	Officer Adams	Episode: "And Justice for Some"
1998	Wind on Water	Val Poole	4 episodes
1999	The Love Boat: The Next Wave	Nick	Episode: "Three Stages of Love"
1999	Charmed	Josh	3 episodes
1999	Beverly Hills, 90210	Wayne	5 episodes
1999–2000	Pensacola: Wings of Gold	Dr. Lawrence Brandon	3 episodes
2000	Time of Your Life	Randall	Episode: "The Time They Decided to Date"
2000	V.I.P.	Michael Ellins	Episode: "Run, Val, Run"
2001	CSI: Crime Scene Investigation	Chad Matthews / Patrick Haynes	Episode: "Table Stakes"
2001	Crossing Jordan	Adam Flynn	3 episodes
2001	Spin City	Santa Claus	Episode: "An Office and a Gentleman
2001	Friends	Dr. Schiff	2 episodes
2002	The Chronicle	Dennis	Episode: "Hot from the Oven"
2002	Haunted	Detective Sykes	Episode: "Nocturne"
2002	The Drew Carey Show	Grant	Episode: "The Dawn Patrol"
2002	One Life to Live	Ross Rayburn	Recurring role
2002	Red Skies	David Cross	Television movie
2002–2003	Birds of Prey	Wade Brixton	Recurring role, 8 episodes
2002–2003	Becker	Kevin	Episodes: "L.A. Woman", "Nightmare on Becker Street"
2003	Coupling	Thad	Episode: "Nipple Effect"
2003	Undercover Christmas	Jake Cunningham	Television movie
2004	10-8: Officers on Duty	Stephen James	Episode: "Love Don't Love Nobody"
2004	Happy Family	Hair Dresser	Episode: The Shampoo Effect"
2004	1-800-Missing	FBI Special Agent Darren Merritt / Jared Hart	Episodes: "Truth or Dare: Part 1 & 2"
2004–2005	Summerland	Johnny Durant	Main role, 26 episodes
2005	Boston Legal	Tim Bauer	3 episodes
2005	Hot Properties	John	Episode: "Chick Stuff"
2005	CSI: NY	Ryan Chisholm	Episode: "Jamalot"
2005	Murder in the Hamptons	Daniel Pelosi	Television movie
2006	Will & Grace	Travis	Episode: "Cowboys and Iranians"
2006	CSI: Miami	Carl Silvers	Episode: "Rio"
2006	Las Vegas	Dr. Derek Stephenson	5 episodes
2006	Runaway	Dr. Fisher	3 episodes
2006	12 Miles of Bad Road	Jasper Case	Episode: "Moonshadow"
2007	Ghost Whisperer	Wyatt Jenkins	Episode: "The Cradle Will Rock"
2007	Side Order of Life	Jack Sager	Episode: "Try to Remember"
2007	Shark	Kerry Conklin	Episode: "Every Breath You Take"
2008–2017, 2020	Days of Our Lives	Dr. Daniel Jonas	Contract role (2008–16), Guest role (2016–17, 2020)
2010	Secrets of the Mountain	Tom Kent	Television movie
2010–2012	Venice: The Series	Brandon	Web series; recurring role, 24 episodes
2012	Melissa & Joey	Sam Davis	Episode: "Pretty Big Liars"
2017–2018	Famous in Love	Alan Mills	
2017	Unwritten Obsession	Paul	Lifetime movie
2018	Mommy Be Mine	Steve	Lifetime movie
2018	The Rookie	Jeremy Hawke	Episode: "The Hawke"
2018	Instakiller	Derek	Lifetime movie
2019	Love in the Sun	Micah	Hallmark movie
2019	Ruby Herring Mysteries: Silent Witness	John Herring	Hallmark movie
2021	Chicago Med	Miles Henderson	Episode S7E20: "End of the day, anything can happen"
2023	Magnum P.I.	Cole Graham	Episode: "The Breaking Point"
