= My Antonio =

- Genre: Reality television Docu-soap
- Directed by: Peter Ney
- Starring: Antonio Sabàto, Jr.
- Country of origin: United States
- No. of seasons: 1
- No. of episodes: 10

Production
- Executive producers: Michael Hirschorn; Stella Bulochnikov Stolper; Chris Choun; Michael Bloom
- Producers: Tracy Steinsapir; Stewart Strunk
- Cinematography: Keith Duggan
- Editors: Buzz Chatman; Tato Maizza; Dan Morita
- Running time: 60 minutes (including commercials)
- Production company: Ish Entertainment

Original release
- Network: VH1
- Release: August 16 – October 25, 2009

My Antonio is a reality television show about Antonio Sabàto, Jr., first broadcast on VH1 on August 16, 2009 until October 25, 2009.

== Plot ==
The series followed Sabàto (37 years of age at the time) in his search for a partner. A total of 14 single, middle-aged women from different backgrounds, places, and ethnicities arrived in Hawaii to compete for Sabàto's approval. Extra drama was created through the addition of Sabàto's mother, Yvonne Kabouchy and the appearance of his ex-wife, Tully Jensen as one of the competitors.

== Cast ==
| Name | Age^{[a]} | Occupation | Hometown |
|---|---|---|---|
| Brooke Barlow | 30 | Nurse | Jackson, MS |
| Miranda Reinfeldt | 30 | Makeup Artist | New York, NY |
| Tully Jensen | 45 | Unemployed | Saratoga, FL |
| Christi Shake | 28 | Playboy Model/Actress | Baltimore, MD |
| Tania Mehra | 27 | Model/Actress | Philadelphia, PA |
| Autumn Anderson | 22 | NASA Researcher | New York, NY |
| Jessica Falandys | 21 | Student/Dancer | Providence, RI |
| Jennifer Timmins | 26 | Bartender | Houston, TX |
| Monique | 29 | Video Game Producer | Santa Clara, CA |
| Julann | 35 | Real Estate Agent | Lynwood, CA |
| Sarah Haeussler | 28 | Stripper | Rockaway, NJ |
| Anju McIntyre | 31 | Party Planner | New Delhi, India |
| Courtney | 38 | Interior Designer | Toronto, ON |
| Nathalie Du Mortier | 28 | Event Promoter | Paris, France |

^[a] Ages are at the time of filming.

== Episode progress ==
| No. | Castmembers | Episodes | | | | | | | | | |
| No. | Castmembers | 1 | 2 | 3 | 4 | 5 | 6 | 7 | 8 | 9 | 10 |
|---|---|---|---|---|---|---|---|---|---|---|---|
| 1 | Brooke | SAFE | SAFE | SAFE | WIN | SAFE | SAFE | WIN | SAFE | RISK | WINNER |
| 2 | Miranda | RISK | SAFE | SAFE | SAFE | SAFE | WIN | SAFE | SAFE | RISK | OUT |
| 3 | Tully | | SAFE | RISK | SAFE | SAFE | SAFE | SAFE | | OUT | |
| 4 | Christi | SAFE | SAFE | WIN | SAFE | WIN | RISK | RISK | OUT | | |
| 5 | Tania | SAFE | SAFE | WIN | SAFE | SAFE | WIN | OUT | | | |
| 6 | Autumn | SAFE | SAFE | SAFE | SAFE | WIN | OUT | | | | |
| 7 | Jessica | SAFE | RISK | SAFE | WIN | OUT | | | | | |
| 8 | Jennifer | SAFE | SAFE | SAFE | QUIT | | | | | | |
| 9 | Monique | SAFE | SAFE | OUT | | | | | | | |
| 10 | Julann | SAFE | OUT | | | | | | | | |
| 11 | Sarah | SAFE | QUIT | | | | | | | | |
| 12 | Anju | OUT | | | | | | | | | |
| 13 | Courtney | OUT | | | | | | | | | |
| 14 | Nathalie | OUT | | | | | | | | | |

The cast member won the competition.
The cast member won a date and was safe from being eliminated.
The cast member did not win a date, but was safe from being eliminated.
The cast member was at risk of being eliminated.
The cast member was eliminated.
The cast member was included only half of the episode.
The cast member was eliminated outside the elimination ceremony.
The cast member voluntarily withdrew from the competition.

== Episodes ==
=== Episode 1 (First aired on August 16, 2009) ===
Antonio swims ashore and immediately dismisses one of the women, Nathalie, because he 'didn't like her hands and feet'. The remaining ladies have to climb up Mount Pu' U' in a show of determination for Antonio.

- Activity: Climbing the mountain
- Bottom 2: Anju, Miranda
- Eliminated: Anju, Courtney, Nathalie

Antonio's Reasons:

- Nathalie – Antonio was not physically attracted to her, in part because he felt her hands and her feet were unattractive.
- Courtney – Antonio's mother felt she wasn't right for him because of her artificial look, so he eliminated her on that basis.
- Anju – She told Antonio that she shouldn't/wouldn't be restricted to one person, and Antonio wants someone who will be committed to just him.

=== Episode 2 (First aired on August 23, 2009) ===
Everyone is still buzzing over the shock of Tully's arrival. But the shock turns into horror, as Sarah has an emotional breakdown in the middle of the night. Antonio seeks out Tully, and they have their first conversation after being estranged for nearly 20 years. Tully begs for a second chance. Antonio doesn't trust her motives for being here, but reluctantly agrees to let her stay.

- Activity: Hypnotism
- Quit: Sarah
- Bottom 2: Jessica, Julann
- Eliminated: Julann

Antonio's Reason: Antonio felt that Julann only cared about herself and not of the importance of Sarah's problems; she felt that Antonio should care only about the ones who have no problems, unlike Sarah.

=== Episode 3 (First aired on August 30, 2009) ===
Tully moves into the suite with the rest of the women, and is greeted with suspicion and ridicule. Jen has a feeling that Tully is really Antonio's sister. The following day finds Antonio organizing a "M'Antonio" workout to test the ladies physical mettle. Antonio next tests their romantic spirit by having them to write love-letters to him.

- Activity: Workout with Antonio
- Challenge: Writing a love letter to Antonio
- Challenge Winners: Christi, Tania (Honorable Mention: Autumn)
  - Tania's Date: Dinner with Antonio
  - Christi's Date: Boat ride with Antonio
- Bottom 2: Monique, Tully
- Eliminated: Monique

Antonio's Reason: Antonio didn't feel a real connection with her.

=== Episode 4 (First aired on September 6, 2009) ===
The ladies are given the Hula challenge: Each must tell the best story of their heart through a hula dance will win a romantic date with Antonio. Mamma has a chat with Christi about Tully and sniffing out some ugly details about Tully's past and report back to Yvonne.

- Challenge: Hula Dancing
- Challenge Winners: Brooke, Jessica
  - Brooke's Date: Helicopter ride and lunch with Antonio
  - Jessica's Date: Swimming/playing with the dolphins
- Quit: Jennifer (She quit because she felt that she was not comfortable with Antonio around all these other women and that she deserved more time from Antonio.)

=== Episode 5 (First aired on September 20, 2009) ===
After elimination, Christi confronts Miranda about her comments that Christi was sloppy drunk during the elimination ceremony. The next morning, Antonio gathers the girls so they can play a game of "Toni Says", where Tully emerges victorious and spends more time with her ex-husband: The other girls feel intimidated and spy on their alone time. Later, the women must compete in the main challenge, sculpting a clay figurine of Antonio as he poses nude. Autumn and Christi emerge victorious, and Antonio and the two girls will later have a romantic boat ride date. Meanwhile, the girls attend a disco with Antonio, where tension rises between the girls as Christi and Tania clash after Tania accuses her of being two-faced. After the date, Tully tells Jessica that she's too young for Antonio, and she lashes back and points out that Tully still lives in her parents and does not have a job. Miranda has not spent time with Antonio due to an allergic reaction to a spider bite, and the girls ponder why she's so confident that she's staying since she never spends time with Antonio. At elimination, Antonio says so long to Jessica, telling her that she's too young.

- Challenge: Sculpting Naked Antonio
- Challenge Winners: Autumn, Christi
  - Autumn and Christi's Date: Fishing boat ride with Antonio
- Eliminated: Jessica

Antonio's Reason: Antonio thought Jessica was too young/needed to have more life experience.

=== Episode 6 (First aired on September 27, 2009) ===
The next day, Antonio tells the girls to memorize scripts for soap opera scenes with Antonio, where they will have to perform and record their scenes in front of an audience. The winner will win a date with Antonio.

- Challenge: Soap Opera Scenes with Antonio
- Challenge Winner(s): Miranda, Tania
  - Miranda's Date: Zip line
  - Tania's Date: Off-Road Drive
- Bottom 2: Autumn, Christi
- Eliminated: Autumn

=== Episode 7 (First aired on October 4, 2009) ===
- Challenge: Stay On An Island And Wait For Antonio
- Challenge Winner: Brooke
  - Brooke's Date: Massage from Antonio
- Bottom 2: Christi, Tania
- Eliminated: Tania

Antonio's Reason: He wasn't feeling a 100% connection with Tania.

=== Episode 8 (First aired on October 11, 2009) ===
- Activity: Marrying Antonio
- Eliminated: Christi
- Episode notes: Yvonne (Antonio's mother) came clean with Antonio that she recruited Christi to spy on Tully and the other girls and report back to her with information on them. Antonio eliminated Christi during the wedding challenge outside the elimination ceremony. Earlier in the episode, Tully got off the horse during the outing with Yvonne and ripped open her stomach muscles and resulted in internal bleeding and was rushed to the hospital, where she remained for the rest of the episode, with Antonio visiting her.

=== Episode 9 (First aired on October 18, 2009) ===
- Brooke's Date: Boat Riding Date
- Miranda's Date: Blind Folded Kissing Date
- Tully's Date: Socializing About The Past
- Eliminated: Tully

=== Episode 10 (First aired on October 25, 2009) ===
Brooke won because he liked her name (it reminded him of water). Their winning activity was to go to South Wales and enjoy a battered fish on the shore line.

- Runner-Up: Miranda
- Winner: Brooke
