= James Robert Baker =

American author (1947–1997)

- Baker in 1988
- Born: October 18, 1947; Long Beach, California, US
- Died: November 5, 1997 (aged 50); Pacific Palisades, California, US
- Occupations: Screenwriter; novelist
- Writing career
- Genre: Satire
- Notable works: Boy Wonder; Tim and Pete
- Movement: Transgressional fiction

James Robert Baker (October 18, 1947 – November 5, 1997) was an American author of sharply satirical, predominantly gay-themed transgressional fiction. A native Californian, his work is set almost entirely in Southern California. After graduating from UCLA, he began his career as a screenwriter, but became disillusioned and started writing novels instead. Though he garnered fame for his books Fuel-Injected Dreams and Boy Wonder, after the controversy surrounding publication of his novel, Tim and Pete, he faced increasing difficulty having his work published. According to his life partner, this was a contributing factor in his suicide.

Baker's work has achieved cult status in the years since his death, and two additional novels have been posthumously published. First-edition copies of his earlier works have become collector's items. His novel Testosterone was adapted to a film of the same name, though it was not a financial success. Two other books have been optioned for films, but they have not been produced.

== Early life ==
Baker was born in Long Beach, California and raised in what he considered a "stifling, Republican Southern Californian household". Rebelling against his parents, he became attracted to the fringe elements of society, including beatniks (anyone living as a bohemian, acting rebelliously, or appearing to advocate a revolution in manners), artists and gays. In high school during the 1960s he explored his sexuality at underground gay teen nightclubs, while living in fear that his abusive father would find out. At one point, his father hired a private detective to follow him, when he suspected Baker was having an affair with a male neighbor. This family dynamic would be used in many of his novels, most extensively in Boy Wonder.

Baker began taking drugs, and became, in his own words, "an out of control, teenage speed freak". He also began drinking heavily, attributing it to the fact that he was closeted. However, even after coming out, his substance abuse remained excessive and "still had a life of its own". After sobering up, he attended UCLA film school, where he was one of the winners of the Samuel Goldwyn Writing Awards, and directed two films: Mouse Klub Konfidential and Blonde Death. Mouse Klub Konfidential, a film about a Mickey Mouse Club Mouseketeer who becomes a gay bondage pornographer, was a controversial entry in the 1976 San Francisco's LGBT Film Festival, as some thought Baker was actually advocating Nazism. It is also credited with having caused Michael Medved to abandon his dream of film making and instead become a film critic.

== Writer ==
Baker's lifelong ambition was to write. Upon graduating from UCLA, he spent approximately five years writing Hollywood screenplays in the early 1980s, a process he hated. While financially successful, he was frustrated that his work was not being produced. "I felt like a door-to-door salesman going to all these [story] pitch meetings ... [filled with] rabid, hideous morons".

Turning his attention to novels, his first book, Adrenaline, was published under the pseudonym James Dillinger. A story of two gay fugitive lovers on the run, it presaged the satire and drug fueled violence so prominent in his later books. Here Baker began developing the themes that dominated his following works: anarchy; angry and somewhat paranoid gay men; the dark underside of Los Angeles, juxtaposed with its sunny outward image; the hypocrisy of organized religion; anonymous sex and its implications in the age of AIDS; and homophobia and the oppression of gays in a Republican dominated America. Its plot device of underdog characters forced into flight due to circumstances beyond their control was one Baker explored in all of his subsequent work. The modest success of this novel encouraged him to devote himself to what have become his best known works, Fuel-Injected Dreams (a novel revolving around a character loosely based on record producer Phil Spector) and the 1986 release Boy Wonder. After the novel was published, he stopped screenwriting in order to solely concentrate on books. He spent the bulk of each day writing and researching, and acted out characters and scenes of his novels on videotape to perfect the dialogue.

His primary focus was gay-themed writing, though he also wrote about the entertainment industry. Mostly satirical, his writing was filled with increasingly clear anger and disdain for the Republican neo-con agenda, especially after the AIDS pandemic began to take a large toll on the gay community. A very strong voice in gay literature, Baker had admirers and detractors for his gay radical stance, both in the mainstream literary community as well as the gay community itself.

A self-described anarchist, Baker has been categorized as a writer of transgressional fiction, in that his novels are frequently populated by sociopathic, nihilistic characters who engage in taboo behaviors such as heavy drug use, incest, necrophilia and other practices; and often commit acts of extreme, surrealistic violence. A man of eclectic tastes, Baker cited as literary influences writers and film directors ranging from Proust to Jim Thompson and Sam Peckinpah. He also admired the punk writer Dennis Cooper.

His work is filled with pop cultural references to both film and music, as well as politics. Orson Welles' Touch of Evil and John Ford's The Searchers are mentioned prominently in more than one of his books, and Roxy Music is referenced in virtually every novel he wrote. The imagery in his novels is largely cinematic, with expressions such as "fade in/fade out", "quick cut" and "VistaVision"; and sentences such as "a montage traces the next fifteen years" and "If the last reel of Cheryl's life had been a CinemaScope Technicolor movie ...".

== Critical reception ==
Baker's work received mixed reviews. His only two books not specifically gay themed (though containing gay characters and a somewhat gay sensibility), Boy Wonder and Fuel-Injected Dreams, were better received by critics, and more popular with readers, though he was never a bestselling novelist. Baker himself estimated that his books sold approximately 25,000 copies each. His following book, however, Tim and Pete, met with hostile reviews, primarily for its advocacy of political assassination and terror tactics in combating AIDS discrimination. Baker himself was ambivalent on the subject. "I think assassination does change things ... But I'm not really calling for violence," he said. "It's a novel, not a position paper."

In a 1993 interview, however, Baker stated:

I think a strong case can be made that political assassination actually does change things. If you look at the assassinations in this country in the 1960s you can certainly see how it affected history in a very profound way. So if you killed right wing figures, you'd also be altering the course of history, and eliminating people who might very well be president in 1996 and those who are making bashing gays their number one issue right now. On the one hand, I'm not advocating PWA's turn themselves into human bombs, but on the other hand I have to admit that if I clicked on CNN and heard somebody had blown Patrick Buchanan's head clean off, I'd be elated, and to say otherwise would be a lie.

There were also charges of racism, due to his portrayals of blacks and Hispanics. Baker denied those charges, and pointed out that the protagonist later realized that the blacks were also gay and the Latina "was just a sweet old woman putting up with a lot of (stuff) that I couldn't even imagine." He went on to say, "I just wanted to explore the conflicts between gays and Latinos and gays and blacks ... the real feelings [and the] misapprehensions of each other. I realized it wouldn't all be nice and politically correct. If blacks (and Latinos) want my respect, they have to deal with their own homophobia. I'm not playing guilty liberal anymore".

The book caused a great deal of controversy among critics, with some calling it "irresponsible", and saying it was "determined to give offense" and "appears to endorse violence". One critic of the book wrote, "The work rapidly becomes an apology for political terrorism and effectively advocates the assassination of the entire American New Right. While the reasons for such a vengeance motif are perhaps evident, can it really be countenanced? Are we still justified in referring to this as art? And even if we are, is there a point at which such invective (and such suggestions) become simply counterproductive?" Another critic, however, called it "a masterful creation" and wrote: "In coming years Baker will be seen as having understood the implications of this period in our history while the rest of us were simply living it". It polarized the reading public as well, with letters to the editor of major newspapers both supporting and opposing Baker's ideology. Baker himself was aware that the book would be controversial, and deliberately provoked much of the reaction he received. He said: "Tim and Pete tries to convey in print what people really think rather than what they should think or what's P.C. My fantasy was to leave readers so infuriated they'd throw down the book and march right out to a gun store because they wanted to see the finale so bad they realize the only way it'd happen is if they make it happen in real life!"

Bleeding Skull released Baker's film Blonde Death on Blu-ray in 2024 and ranked it the #1 "Best Shot-on-Video Film".

== Death ==
After the reception of Tim and Pete, with several critics calling him "The Last Angry Gay Man", Baker faced increasing difficulty finding a publisher for his work and his financial position became precarious. He was only able to publish one novella, Right Wing, and that was self-published on the Internet.

Baker's life partner, Ron Robertson, believes that this difficulty led Baker on a quick, downwards emotional spiral. Baker killed himself at his home on November 5, 1997, by asphyxiation in his garage. His death was noted in literary circles and mainstream press; the Gay Times in the United Kingdom wrote, "Baker's suicide is particularly tragic because it robs American gay writing of a refreshingly distinctive voice quite unlike the po-faced prose of so many of his contemporaries."

== Legacy ==
After his death, Baker's reputation steadily increased among critics and the reading public and his works gained cult status in the literary community.

Robertson, Baker's literary executor, was successful in having two additional novels published after Baker's death. One of those, Testosterone, was filmed in 2003. Directed by David Moreton and starring Antonio Sabato Jr., the plot was significantly altered and the film was a critical and financial failure. Both Boy Wonder and Fuel-Injected Dreams have been optioned for the movies several times, most recently in 2004, though they were never produced. Baker's work has also been published in Germany, Sweden, Italy, Great Britain, Australia, Japan and Russia.

Boy Wonder, a black satire of the film industry, is also a parody of the "oral biographies" popularized by George Plimpton with his books about Edie Sedgwick and Truman Capote, in that the protagonist's life is revealed in the form of interviews between the writer and the characters. Though it has been praised as "one of the few novels from the last couple of decades that could justifiably be called a classic", reviewers have also pointed out that it is probably unfilmable due to its bitter cynicism regarding the movie industry.

Baker's last published work, Right Wing, as well as his posthumous novels Testosterone and Anarchy, represent a stylistic departure in that he inserts himself into the plot as either a secondary character or the protagonist. The latter two were edited, and in the case of Anarchy, partially rewritten by his editor, Scott Brassart. Testosterone needed only minor changes, while Anarchy underwent an entire rewrite, with Brassart restructuring the plot and streamlining over 500 pages of prose and notes into a fast-paced, 250 page novel. For the reader, however, it is only Baker's voice as writer that is heard.

Three of Baker's books had not been published as of 2006: White Devils, Proto Punk, and Crucifying Todd. Additionally, he wrote two screenplays which have not as yet been filmed: Inez and Desert Women.

== Published works ==
- Adrenaline (1985) Signet Books/New American Library ISBN 978-0-451-13563-6
- Fuel-Injected Dreams (1986) E. P. Dutton ISBN 978-0-525-24417-2
- Boy Wonder (1988) New American Library ISBN 978-0-453-00597-5
- Tim and Pete (1993) Simon & Schuster ISBN 978-0-671-79184-1
- Right wing (1996, only published on the Internet)
- Testosterone (published posthumously 2000) Alyson Publications ISBN 978-1-55583-567-5
- Anarchy (published posthumously 2002) Alyson Publications ISBN 978-1-55583-743-3
