= Adrenaline (disambiguation) =

Adrenaline is a hormone and neurotransmitter also known as epinephrine.

Adrenalin(e) may also refer to:

== Medicine ==
- Adrenalin, a trademarked epinephrine product of Endo International

== Music ==
- Adrenalin (band), an American rock group
- Adrenaline (album), a 1995 album by Deftones
- Adrenalin, a 2010 album by Faizal Tahir
- "Adrenaline", a song by Ateez on the EP Golden Hour: Part.4
- "Adrenaline", a song by Bauhaus on the album Go Away White
- "Adrenaline", a song by Cravity
- "Adrenaline", a song by Dream
- "Adrenaline", a song by Emma Pollock on the album Watch the Fireworks
- "Adrenaline" (Gavin Rossdale song), 2002
- "Adrenaline" (Shinedown song), 2013
- "Adrenalin/Distant Dreams (Part Two)", a 1980 single by Throbbing Gristle
- "Adrenaline", a song by 12 Stones on the 2007 album Anthem for the Underdog
- "Adrenaline", a song by The Roots on the 1999 album Things Fall Apart
- "Adrenaline", a song by Rosetta Stone (band) on the 1993 album Adrenaline
- "Adrenaline", a song by X Ambassadors on the 2021 album The Beautiful Liar
- Adrenaline, a 2003-2012 metal band
  - Adrenaline, a song from their 2004 EP Inspired by Anger used in FlatOut
- "Adrenalin EP", a 1991 single by N-Joi

== Other ==
- Adrenaline (autobiography), by Zlatan Ibrahimović
- Adrenaline (novel), by James Robert Baker
- Adrenalin: Fear the Rush, a 1996 action film
- ADRenalin (Luxembourg), the youth wing of the Alternative Democratic Reform Party, a conservative political party in Luxembourg
- Adrenaline (film), a 2015 film
- Adrenalin (character), a character in the Asterix comic Asterix and the Chieftain's Daughter
- AMD Radeon Software, Adrenalin Edition
- Asphalt 6: Adrenaline, a 2010 racing video game

== See also ==
- Adrenalina (disambiguation)
