= Before You Say I Do =

- Written by: Elena Krupp
- Directed by: Paul Fox
- Starring: David Sutcliffe; Jennifer Westfeldt; Lauren Holly
- Theme music composer: Lawrence Shragge
- Country of origin: United States
- Original language: English

Production
- Producer: Mary Pantelidis
- Cinematography: David A. Makin
- Editor: Ellen Fine
- Running time: 89 minutes
- Production company: Marvista Entertainment

Original release
- Network: Hallmark Channel
- Release: February 14, 2009

Before You Say "I Do" (working title Then Again) is an American television movie directed by Paul Fox. It premiered on Hallmark Channel on February 14, 2009, and was released on DVD on May 4, 2010.

== Plot ==
George Murray has been dating his girlfriend Jane Gardner for some time now, and is ready to propose. However, Jane can't bring herself to marry again after her first husband Doug broke her heart ten years prior by cheating on her with the wedding coordinator. Desperately in love, George wishes things were different: that he had met Jane before she married Doug and became so jaded about marriage. After a car accident, George finds himself exactly ten years back in time, just a few days before Doug and Jane's wedding.

He goes to her work and Jane "meets" him. George also gets revenge on a guy at work who took his colleague Harvey's plans and caused him not to get the promotion he'd been wanting. Jane's friend, Mary Brown, knows all about Doug cheating on Jane, but she can't bring herself to tell Jane. She and George talk about it and plan to get Jane to find out about Doug and the wedding coordinator. Mary wants Jane to go with George, since she despises Doug for cheating on her best friend.

Before she can marry Doug, Jane discovers his philandering and dumps him for George. They run off in his car, getting chased the whole time by Doug. They get into a minor crash and George wakes up ten years into the future from where he is. He and Jane are married and are celebrating their tenth anniversary with a renewal of their vows. Mary married George's friend, Harvey.

== Cast ==
- David Sutcliffe as George Murray
- Jennifer Westfeldt as Jane Gardner
- Lauren Holly as Mary Brown
- Brad Borbridge as Harvey Blinton
- Jeff Roop as Doug
- John Boylan as Mr. Johnson
- Brandon Firla as Jack Harrington
- Roger Dunn as Sam Gardner
- Salvatore Antonio as Freddy
- Reagan Pasternak as Patty
- Jamie Bloch as Laurie
- London Angelis as Billy
- Boyd Banks as Apartment Guy
- Arlene Mazerolle as Guest #1
- Lorry Ayers as Guest #2
