= Undercover Christmas =

- Written by: Darrah Cloud
- Directed by: Nadia Tass
- Starring: Jami Gertz; Tyne Daly; Shawn Christian; Winston Rekert; Cameron Bancroft
- Countries of origin: Canada; United States
- Original language: English

Production
- Running time: 120 minutes

Original release
- Release: 2003

Undercover Christmas is a 2003 American Canadian romantic comedy-drama television film directed by Nadia Tass and starring Jami Gertz, Tyne Daly, Shawn Christian, Winston Rekert, and Cameron Bancroft.

== Plot summary ==
Jake Cunningham (Shawn Christian) is an uptight FBI agent assigned to protect Brandi O'Neill (Jami Gertz), a lower-class cocktail waitress who recently helped with the tax fraud investigation of her billionaire boyfriend. When Jake's wealthy parents (Tyne Daly and Winston Rekert) unexpectedly call him home for the holidays, Jake must bring Brandi with him in order to keep her safe prior to the trial. They pose as a couple in order to keep the proceedings a secret until the court date. The Cunninghams disapprove of the match but begin to accept Jake's "girlfriend" just as Jake and Brandi are truly becoming a couple. Brandi testifies against her former boyfriend. Brandi introduces Jake, her new love, to her mother.

== Cast ==
- Jami Gertz as Brandi O'Neil
- Shawn Christian as Jake Cunningham
- Tyne Daly as Anne Cunningham
- Winston Rekert as Joe Cunningham
- Anne Hawthorne as Stefanie Cunningham
- Cameron Bancroft as Scott Shift
- Alexandra Harvey as Ashley Cunningham

== See also ==
- List of Christmas films
