= Small Town Saturday Night (film) =

- Theatrical release poster
- Directed by: Ryan Craig
- Written by: Ryan Craig
- Produced by: Charlie Mason; Justin Moore-Lewy; Ryan Craig; Wonder Fortune Serra
- Starring: Chris Pine; Shawn Christian; John Hawkes; Bre Blair; Muse Watson; Robert Pine; Brent Briscoe; Lin Shaye
- Cinematography: Matt Kovalakides
- Edited by: Robert Stambler
- Music by: Steve Bertrand
- Production company: Perfect Weekend
- Distributed by: Grindstone Entertainment Group
- Release date: June 1, 2010
- Running time: 94 minutes
- Country: United States
- Language: English

Small Town Saturday Night is a 2010 American ensemble drama film by writer-director Ryan Craig. The film stars Chris Pine, Shawn Christian, John Hawkes and Bre Blair. The film also features actors Muse Watson, Robert Pine, Brent Briscoe, Scott Michael Campbell, Adam Hendershott, Octavia Spencer, Kali Majors and Lin Shaye.

== Plot ==
The subtle connections of a deputy sheriff, a Nashville-bound singer, an ex-con, and a single mother will intertwine in this tale of small-town life. Tommy Carson (Shawn Christian) works around the clock to keep the peace in Prospect, but Donny (John Hawkes), who is on a downward spiral, makes this even more difficult for the deputy Sheriff. Rhett Ryan (Chris Pine) discovers that the desire to follow his dream conflicts with his desire to be with the woman he loves. While Samantha (Bre Blair) does love the singer-songwriter, she comes to realize that what's best for her daughter (Kali Majors) and their future may not be what's best for him. Les (Adam Hendershott) just wants to fit in with his big brother's friends, but his overbearing mother (Lin Shaye) desperately wants him to stand out.

== Cast ==
- Chris Pine as Rhett Ryan
- Shawn Christian as Tommy Carson
- John Hawkes as Donny
- Bre Blair as Samantha Carson
- Octavia Spencer as Rhonda Dooley
- Muse Watson as Charlie
- Robert Pine as John Ryan
- Brent Briscoe as Travis Perkins
- Scott Michael Campbell as Dwayne Murphy
- Adam Hendershott as Les Ryan
- Kali Majors as Megan Carson
- Lin Shaye as Phyllis Ryan
- Gerald Darnell as Jerry The Truck Driver
- Martin Corcoran as Chance

== Production ==
Shot on location in the San Bernardino mountain villages of Crestline, Valley of Enchantment, Twin Peaks, Blue Jay, Lake Arrowhead and Running Springs, California, Craig wanted the setting to be a character unto itself. He also wanted the town to look and feel like Anywhere, USA. The film's opening sequence was shot in Oregon to pay homage to the director's hometown.

== Release ==
The film premiered at the American Film Market in November 2009. It was later shopped around at the European Film Market in February 2010, as well as a May 18, 2010 screening at the Cannes Film Market.

The film was set for a U.S. DVD release date of June 1, 2010 by Lionsgate.

The film's musical score was composed by Steve Bertrand.

== Soundtrack ==
1. "Heartbreakin' Wreck" - The Boxmasters
2. "Good Day To Go Crazy" - Wade Hayes
3. "Life Ain't Long Enough" - Ray Scott
4. "Country Boyz" - Phil Vassar
5. "Never Too Late" - Sheri Short
6. "It Happens" - Rachael Thibodeau
7. "And Then I Did" - Jeffrey Steele
8. "Cool Became Me" - The Warren Brothers
9. "Novocaine" - Little Big Town
10. "We Rode in Trucks" - Luke Bryan
11. "Small Town Big Time" - Chris Young
12. "Hollow Walls" - The Boxmasters
13. "Good Way To Go" - Jonathan Singleton
14. "A Girl Like You" - Curtis Lance
15. "Someday Came Today" - Chris Pine
16. "Population Sign" - Wade Hayes
