= Testosterone (2003 film) =

- Directed by: David Moreton
- Written by: Dennis Hensley; James Robert Baker (novel)
- Produced by: David Moreton
- Starring: David Sutcliffe; Antonio Sabato Jr. Jennifer Coolidge
- Cinematography: Ken Kelsch
- Edited by: Mallory Gottlieb; Roger Schulte
- Music by: Marco D'Ambrosio
- Distributed by: Strand Releasing
- Release date: March 8, 2003 (U.S.)
- Running time: 105 minutes
- Countries: United States; Argentina
- Language: English

Testosterone is a 2003 film directed by David Moreton and starring David Sutcliffe, Antonio Sabato, Jr., and Jennifer Coolidge. It is an adaptation of James Robert Baker's novel Testosterone.

== Plot summary ==
Dean Seagrave (David Sutcliffe) is a thirty-something graphic novelist living in L.A., and though he's found personal happiness with his boyfriend Pablo (Antonio Sabato Jr.), he can't surmount his writer's block slump following his successful debut graphic novel, Teenage Speed Freak. His life begins to unravel when his editor, Luise (Coolidge), gives him an ultimatum and Pablo leaves him. Lonely, depressed, and at the end of his rope, Seagrave flies to Argentina in search of closure, but the characters he discovers there – Pablo's secretive and controlling Mother (Sônia Braga), Pablo's ex-lover Marcos (Leonardo Brzezicki), and Marcos' enigmatic sister Sofia (Celina Font) – conspire to prevent him from reaching Pablo.

== Cast ==
- David Sutcliffe as Dean Seagrave
- Celina Font as Sofia
- Antonio Sabato Jr. as Pablo Alesandro
- Jennifer Coolidge as Louise
- Leonardo Brzezicki as Marcos
- Sônia Braga (billed as Sonia Braga) as Pablo's Mother
- Dario Dukah as Guillermo
- Jennifer Elise Cox as Sharon, the Perky Chick
- Davenia McFadden as Marnie
- Ezequiel Abeijón as Rogelio
- Martín Borisenko as Hot Cater Waiter
- Barbara Bunge as Bridesmaid
- Gustavo Chapa as Cemetery Man
- Daniel Di Biase as Taxi Driver
- Gabriel Dottavio as Customer
- Americo Ferrari as Bald Man
- Harry Havilio as Front Desk Man
- Wolfram Hecht (billed as Wolfram Hoechst) as Older Gentleman
- Carlos Kaspar as Fat Bad Dude
- Miriam Manfredini as Tourist Mother
- Carolina Marcovsky as La Luna Hostess
- Luis Mazzeo as Policeman
- Hector Pazos as Big Policeman
- Fabrizio Perez as Fat Bad Dude #2
- Luis Sabatini as Salesman
- Alejandro Stulchlik as Fat Bad Dude #3
- Claudio Torres as Fat Bad Dude #4
- Marcos Woinsky as Mr. Ottenhouse
- McCaleb Burnett as Guy in Turtleneck
- Julie Fay as Fabulous Gallery Guest
- Sergio Gravier as Slight Man
- Marcelo Aguilar as Mr. Chip / Guy in car

== Filming locations ==
Although the setting for the story of Testosterone starts in Los Angeles, California and then moves to Buenos Aires, Argentina, the Los Angeles scenes were filmed in Buenos Aires and the Buenos Aires scenes were filmed in Los Angeles.
