= Murder in the Hamptons =

2005 Canadian television film

- Written by: Robert L. Freedman; Michael Shnayerson
- Directed by: Jerry Ciccoritti
- Starring: Poppy Montgomery; David Sutcliffe; Shawn Christian
- Country of origin: Canada

Production
- Running time: 120 minutes

Original release
- Release: July 11, 2005

Murder in the Hamptons (also known as Million Dollar Murder) is a true story made-for-TV movie, based on the events leading to the murder of multi-millionaire Ted Ammon and the conviction of Ted's estranged wife's lover Daniel Pelosi.

== Plot ==
The movie is told through various points of view in a semi-documentary. Generosa (Poppy Montgomery) is a struggling artist who sells real estate, and one day, when client Ted (David Sutcliffe) fails to show up, she goes over to confront him. They soon fall in love, get married and are happy for several years during which time they adopt twin orphans: Alexa Ammon (Aislinn Paul) and Greg Ammon (Munro Chambers). Whether a result of being a mother or from an organic or drug-induced biochemical imbalance, Generosa becomes increasingly paranoid accusing Ted of, among other indiscretions, adultery. Her erratic behavior tears the marriage apart, thereby unleashing a very contentious divorce procedure with Generosa demanding custody of the twins, ownership of their house in the Hamptons and, if possible, all of Ted's wealth. She even resorts to lying to the children about Ted in an attempt to turn them against him.

Unable to come to an agreement, Generosa and the twins stay at a hotel where she meets her contractor Daniel "Danny" Pelosi (Shawn Christian), and the two start a relationship, with him pushing her to hold out for money from Ted. When Ted is murdered, she inherits all of Ted's estate; three months thereafter, she and Danny get married. She holds back the truth about Ted's death from her children by telling them that Ted committed suicide by drinking alcohol, along with swallowing pills. Generosa and Danny eventually come under police suspicion. Generosa learns that she's dying from breast cancer.

Danny wants custody of the kids, but Generosa rejects the idea because he'd been partying and spending her money carelessly. She changes her will, leaving Danny with only $2,000,000, $1,000,000 to her housekeeper and nanny, Kaye, and the remainder of her wealth to her children. Kaye also receives custody of the children, and soon sends Greg away to a private school, while his sister remains behind. Some time after Generosa's death, Danny is arrested for Ted's murder. In 2004, Danny is found guilty and is sentenced to 25 years to life.

== Cast ==
- Poppy Montgomery as Generosa Ammon.
- David Sutcliffe as Ted Ammon
- Shawn Christian as Daniel Pelosi
- Aislinn Paul as Alexa Ammon
- Munro Chambers as Greg Ammon
- Peter Outerbridge as Gordon Wintrob
- Donna Goodhand as Aunt Carrie, Generosa and Ted's sister and the kids' aunt.
- Helene Joy as Grace
- Gabriel Hogan as Matt
- Tara Rosling as Carrie Wilder
- Michael A. Miranda as Artie Rubino
- Joris Jarsky as Carl Masella
- Alex Poch-Goldin as Ed Burke
- Nadia Capone as Oncologist
- Kate Trotter as Neighbor
- Brigitte Robinson as Charlotte
- Tracey Ferencz as Denise
- Landy Cannon as Tennis Pro
- Aliska Malish as Beach Girl
- Kasia Vassos as Beach Girl
- Maxim Roy as Lindy Fisher
- Lindsey Connell as Secretary
- Allasen Miscion as Alexa Ammon, 4 years old
- Mitchell Nye as Greg Ammon, 4 years old
- Vito Rezza as Cab Driver
- Sarain Boylan as Tammy
- Roman Podhora as The Bartender
- James Allodi as Architect
- Alex Karzis as Landscaper
- Pedro Salvín as Concierge
- Johnie Chase as Museum official
- Trent McMullen as Private Investigator
- Marcia Bennett as Psychiatrist
- Diego Klattenhoff as Traffic Cop
- Rory O'Shea as Mark Dell
- Brendan Connor as Kevin Drysdale
- J.C. Kenny as Amanda Zahn
- Alberta Watson as Ted's Lawyer

== Reception ==
A mixed review in the New York Times wrote: "There should have been more of them, more dramatization both of Generosa's taste and her craziness. More dramatization of Ted's kindness and his killer instincts for finance. And finally more dramatization of Danny's skills and his charisma, as well as his way with children. (If in fact he had such a way.)”
