= Ted Ammon =

American lawyer (1949–2001)

- Born: Robert Theodore Ammon; August 30, 1949; Pittsburgh, Pennsylvania, U.S.
- Died: October 20, 2001 (aged 52); East Hampton, New York, U.S.
- Cause of death: Bludgeoning
- Education: Bucknell University
- Occupations: Financier, investment banker

Robert Theodore Ammon (August 30, 1949 – October 20, 2001) was an American financier and investment banker. Born in Pittsburgh, Pennsylvania, he was murdered in his home in 2001 by electrician Daniel Pelosi, who was convicted in 2004. Ammon and his wife Generosa Ammon were in the midst of a divorce at the time of his death, and Pelosi was later romantically linked to Ammon's soon-to-be ex-wife. Ammon and his wife had married on February 2, 1986, and had two children, twins Greg Ammon and Alexa Ammon, whom they adopted from the village of Medvedivtsi in the Mukachevo region of Ukraine in October 1992.

At the time of the murder, the couple was near finalization of their divorce. The custody agreement had been signed on October 18, 2001, and the divorce settlement was expected to be consented to the following week. Four months after Ted's death, Generosa married Daniel Pelosi on January 15, 2002; she died of breast cancer on August 22, 2003.

== Early life ==
Ted Ammon was born to Robert E. Ammon, a pension coordinator from Shenango Furnace Co., Neville Island, and Betty Lee Morris, a homemaker, on August 30, 1949, in Pittsburgh, Pennsylvania. Ted graduated from Bucknell University. He entered the Bank of America's executive-training program following his graduation from Bucknell. His first wife, Randee Day, was also a member of the program. They married in 1973 and moved to England. Ted passed the New York bar the first time, without taking a law-school class.

== Career ==
After the Ammons moved back to the United States, he secured a position with Lord, Day and Lord. He went to work at the law firm of Mayer, Brown and Platt. One of this firm's clients was the then small investment firm of Kohlberg, Kravis, Roberts & Co. (KKR). In 1983, following his legal work on a KKR deal (and his divorce from his first wife), Ammon was recruited by the private equity firm, which specialized in leveraged buyouts. Ammon was an associate at Kohlberg, Kravis, Roberts & Co. from 1984 to 1989 and as a general partner from 1990 to 1992. He worked on many deals, notably the famous $31 billion RJ Reynolds/Nabisco takeover. He joined his colleagues in becoming a multimillionaire and was quoted numerous times in the book Barbarians at the Gate: The Fall of RJR Nabisco. Russ Baker in the May 2002 issue of Gotham said "He was along for the wild ride as KKR grew into one of Wall Street's most aggressive and storied leveraged buyout outfits."

In 1992, Ammon left KKR in order to establish his company Big Flower Press. The firm became a leader in the printing of advertising inserts for newspapers. Ammon's goal was to create relationships with newspapers nationwide and then to provide them with other needed commodities. Big Flower was later renamed Vertis Holdings, Inc. Through more than 30 acquisitions, the firm diversified geographically and became a leading international supplier of integrated marketing services, including high-value printing, advertising, and imaging technology.

Vertis went public in 1995; in 1999, it was acquired by a group of investors, including Ammon, in a private leveraged recapitalization. Ammon was chief executive officer from the company's inception until April 1997 and as chairman of the board from the company's formation through December 2000. With Vertis facing dramatically changing market conditions (e.g., a high debt multiple and a slowing pace of acquisitions), a mutually advantageous separation/payout agreement was worked out between Vertis and Ammon. During his time at Vertis, Ammon had put together a "deal team" and venture capital program, managing an in-house venture business. He also had set up several holding companies, which held the vast share of his ownership interests.

These ventures directly invested in both public and non-public companies and in such general areas as technology, media, marketing and management services, and the internet. The specific fields of these companies included print and digital technology, diagnostic radiology, long-distance telephone service, and biopharmaceutical innovation.

After leaving Vertis, Ammon oversaw his team's venture capital investments through the entities that he had established. Much of the money that Vertis had paid to Ammon provided seed money for his investments. Two of the most profitable investments were in Moore Corporation Limited, a Vertis competitor, and National Imaging Associates, Inc., a provider of health care services.

== Marriage, divorce, and death ==
While working as a real estate agent, Generosa met Ted Ammon when she called him after he failed to keep an appointment for an apartment she was to show him. They married in 1986 and adopted a twin boy and girl from Ukraine, whom they named Greg and Alexa.

Ammon's marriage turned hostile after Generosa found a receipt for a divorce lawyer in his desk. They were days from finalizing their divorce when, on October 22, 2001, he was found stunned then bludgeoned to death in his weekend home in East Hampton. Because their divorce was not finalized and Ammon's will had not been changed, Generosa inherited 50 percent of his estate, in accordance with the will, with the balance going to the Ammon Foundation. On January 15, 2002, Generosa married Daniel Pelosi, then sold the properties she had owned jointly with Ammon.

JPMorgan Chase & Co. was appointed along with Generosa as co-executors of the estate. Ultimately, Generosa's estate inherited Ammon's estate. The estate did not pass until after her death. Pelosi was convicted of Ammon's murder in December 2004, and he was sentenced to 25 years to life in prison; he continues to maintain his innocence.

== Charity ==
With a total net worth of some $100 million, Ammon created the largest scholarship fund at Bucknell University. Subsequently, he complemented this endowed program with a challenge/matching grant, resulting in added incentives for others to contribute to his alma mater. He was on the boards of the Municipal Art Society and the YMCA. He attained the title of chairman at Jazz at Lincoln Center, where he worked closely with Wynton Marsalis.

On October 22, 2012, Greg and Alexa Ammon donated a $1 million gift from the Ammon Foundation to Jazz at Lincoln Center to name the R. Theodore Ammon Archives and Music Library. "Ted considered the archive and music library essential to the integrity of this institution. The Ammon Archives and Music Library will be accessible to students and lovers of jazz the world over", said Wynton Marsalis, managing and artistic director of Jazz at Lincoln Center. "My father's deep commitment to Jazz at Lincoln Center inspired my sister Alexa and I to continue his legacy with this naming gift for the preservation and perpetuation of the music he loved so much. Wynton's vision for The Ammon Archive and Music Library aligns with my father's commitment to enrich people's lives around the world with jazz," said Greg Ammon.

On November 15, 2012, Jazz at Lincoln Center hosted a private ribbon cutting for The Ammon Archives and Music Library followed by the New York City film premiere of Greg Ammon's documentary 59 Middle Lane later that evening. Proceeds from the premiere event benefited Jazz at Lincoln Center and the Evan B. Donaldson Adoption Institute.

== Funeral ==
Thousands of people attended a Manhattan memorial service for Ammon in Alice Tully Hall, the home of Jazz at Lincoln Center. Among the Wall Street people in attendance were Henry Kravis, head of Kohlberg, Kravis, Roberts & Co, Apollo Capital chief Leon Black, and Roger Altman, Deputy Treasury Secretary under U.S. President Bill Clinton. Ammon's two children sat with the family but without their mother since, at the request of Ammon's sister Sandra, Generosa did not attend.

At the service, Wynton Marsalis honored Ammon with a New Orleans-style jazz send-off. Before playing the funeral march, Marsalis spoke to the congregation. "We want to know the particulars of death — it repulses us, it calls us, it fascinates us...but only the dead know the facts of death, and they never tell."

Generosa died of breast cancer in August 2003. She left the majority of her estate to the twins, and legal guardianship of them to their nanny Kaye Mayne. Full custody of the twins was awarded to Ammon's sister; they spent the remainder of their childhood with her in Huntsville, Alabama.

David Sutcliffe played Ammon in the TV movie Murder in the Hamptons (also known as Million Dollar Murder).

== Inheritance ==
As Ted had failed to change his will, Generosa inherited the bulk of his estate after he was found murdered. According to an inventory filed with the New York State Surrogates Court, Ammon's estate was valued at $97 million shortly after his death. The document, compiled by his executors J.P. Morgan Chase & Co. (JPM) detailed Ammon's assets to the last penny. J.P. Morgan took the unusual step of challenging Generosa as co-executor of his estate.

== Related people ==
=== Generosa Ammon ===
Generosa Ammon (March 22, 1956, Laguna Beach, California – August 22, 2003, New York City) was Ted Ammon's wife. Generosa and her lover Daniel Pelosi were both suspects in Ammon's bludgeoning death, but Generosa died before charges could be brought against her.

Born Generosa Rand LeGaye, she was raised by a single mother, Marie Theresa LeGaye. When Generosa was 10 years old, her mother died. After her mother's death she was raised by various relatives. She graduated from the University of California, Irvine in 1981, and moved to New York to be an artist.

Just four months after Ted's murder, on January 15, 2002, she married her boyfriend Daniel Pelosi, an unlicensed electrician whom she met when he showed up at the doorstep of her Manhattan townhouse because he was told she was hiring workers for a remodeling job. Pelosi married Generosa on January 15, 2002, one day after his divorce from his wife became final.

While dying of breast cancer, she was offered immunity from prosecution to testify against Pelosi before a grand jury, but refused. Before she died, Generosa cut Pelosi out of her will. He later challenged the will and a postnuptial agreement which entitled him to $2 million for legal fees. He was arrested for Ammon's murder on March 24, 2004.

Generosa died on August 22, 2003. She left her estate to her two children, Alexa and Greg; however, their inheritance was only $1 million each "after taxes, attorneys’ fees and funds lost to Pelosi's squandering." Generosa appointed Kathryn Mayne, the children's nanny, as her children's legal guardian. She also bequeathed a life interest in the house where Ammon was murdered to Mayne to raise the twins. In 2005, however, full custody of the twins was awarded to Ted's sister, Sandra Williams.

=== Daniel Pelosi ===
Daniel Pelosi (born August 2, 1963 (age 63)) is an American man who is the convicted murderer of Ted Ammon, and he is the widower of Generosa Ammon. Pelosi was born in Center Moriches, New York.

Pelosi met Generosa while seeking work as an electrician. Generosa hired him to supervise the renovation of her townhouse, and they soon began an affair. Pelosi, who was also married, with three children, stayed at Ammon's East Hampton home with Generosa and her two adopted children, and drove Ammon's Porsche Carrera. While police investigated Ammon's murder, Pelosi was arrested for punching a crew member of a tour boat when the crewman refused to serve Pelosi more alcohol. He was then charged with stealing $43,000 of electricity from the Long Island Power Authority.

Prosecutors theorized that Pelosi killed Ammon to ensure his new-found lifestyle. His former girlfriend testified that he enjoyed killing Ammon. His father testified that Daniel had asked him how to get rid of incriminating evidence. Convicted in December 2004, Pelosi maintains his innocence.

He pleaded guilty to witness tampering in his murder trial in exchange for dropping criminal charges against his first wife Tami and his new fiancée, Jennifer. Tami was accused in a separate case of helping Pelosi steal $43,000 in electricity, while his fiancée, bank teller Jennifer Zolnowski, was accused of being his accomplice in the murder. With no charges pending against Zolnowski, she was able to marry Pelosi, and they wed before he began his prison sentence. She gave birth to their son on August 31, 2004.

As of August 2022, Pelosi is incarcerated under Department Identification Number (DIN) 05A2706 at the Auburn Correctional Facility and will be eligible for parole on October 14, 2031, at the age of 67.

== Popular culture ==
In 2005, the Lifetime Movie Network released the movie Murder in the Hamptons. The movie is based on Ted Ammon's death. Pelosi was featured on Dateline NBC in the episode titled "Mystery of the Murdered Millionaire" in 2008. Generosa Ammon was portrayed by Poppy Montgomery.

In 2012, he was featured on a 20/20 episode titled "Revenge for Real: Murder in the Hamptons". In May 2012, the Dr. Phil show, episode titled "High Society Whodunit: Murder in the Hamptons", interviews Pelosi behind bars.
