= Adrenalina =

Adrenalina may refer to:

- Adrenalina (album), second studio album by the Italian pop rock group Finley, including a single with the same name
- Adrenalina 2, special edition of the second album Adrenalina by Finley
- "Adrenalina" (Senhit song), 2021 Senhit song featuring Flo Rida representing San Marino in the Eurovision Song Contest 2021
- "Adrenalina" (Wisin song), 2014 Wisin song featuring Ricky Martin and Jennifer Lopez
- Adrenalina (TV series), a Chilean telenovela

== See also ==
- Adrenalina Caribe, Venezuelan Latin and Tropical music group
- Adrenalina Skateboard Marathon
- Adrenaline, a common name for Epinephrine
- Adrenaline (disambiguation)
