= Tim and Pete =

1993 book by James Robert Baker

- First edition
- Author: James Robert Baker
- Language: English
- Subject: Gay love, drug use, AIDS activism, homophobia, radical gay terrorism
- Genre: Gay romantic suspense thriller
- Publisher: Simon & Schuster (1993), Penguin Books (1994), Ringpull (1995), Fourth Estate (1996), Alyson Books (2001)
- Publication date: 1993
- Publication place: United States
- Media type: Print (Paperback)
- Pages: 256
- ISBN: 978-0-671-79184-1
- Preceded by: Boy Wonder (novel)
- Followed by: Right Wing (1996, only published on the Internet)

Tim and Pete is the third novel written by James Robert Baker (1946–1997), an American author of sharply satirical, predominantly gay-themed transgressive fiction. A native Californian, his work is set almost entirely in Southern California. After graduating from UCLA, he began his career as a screenwriter, but became disillusioned and started writing novels instead. Though he garnered fame for his books Fuel-Injected Dreams and Boy Wonder, after the controversy surrounding publication of his novel, Tim and Pete, he faced increasing difficulty having his work published. According to his boyfriend, this was a contributing factor in his suicide. Baker's work has achieved cult status in the years since his death, and two additional novels have been posthumously published. As of 2006, first editions of Adrenaline, Boy Wonder, Fuel-Injected Dreams and Tim and Pete have become collector's items and command high prices at rare book stores. First-edition copies of his earlier works have become collector's items.

Adrenaline was published in 1985 under the pseudonym James Dillinger. A story of two gay fugitive lovers on the run, it presaged the satire and drug fueled violence so prominent in his later books. Here Baker began developing the themes that dominated his following works: anarchy; angry and somewhat paranoid gay men; the dark underside of Los Angeles, juxtaposed with its sunny outward image; the hypocrisy of organized religion; anonymous sex and its implications in the age of AIDS; and homophobia and the oppression of gays in a Republican-dominated America. Its plot device of underdog characters forced into flight due to circumstances beyond their control was one Baker explored in all of his subsequent work. James noted "Baker had many issues with the world at large, homophobic cops and preachers along with closeted Hollywood moguls, in particular, and he was able to find satisfaction in his novels that he could not find in real life" stemming from "pent up anger at the homophobic America at elected Ronald Reagan twice and sat by clucking their teeth while so many gay men died of AIDS." Gay Community News noted "he has an eye for the absurd, the quixotic, and the downright existential in pop culture".

== Plot overview ==
Two former gay lovers, Pete, and the narrator of the novel Tim, are reunited when Tim needs a ride back to Los Angeles. They go on a surreal adventure over the next day-and-a-half, most of it in cars, with memories of the last twenty years, including tea rooms and bathhouses, increasingly enraging them at the AIDS pandemic destruction. Sleep deprived, using gallows humor and self-medicating with mescaline-spiked drinks they travel through an increasingly hostile environment meeting a bizarre and queer cast of supporting characters who fuel undercurrent rage at society's homophobia and the LGBT community's apathy. They meet an occult-obsessed indie filmmaker, leather-dykes, a Southern belle drag queen and then four anarchistic gays who are HIV-positive. The quartet reflect the hopelessness felt as their friends die and the country does little to counteract a "gay" disease. They hope to win the cultural war by assassinating ex-President Ronald Reagan, who did little for the first four years of growing HIV-AIDS epidemic, by bombing him at a church service. Tim and Pete convince the plotters to change targets to a meeting of the American Family Association, a group known for its anti-LGBT rhetoric that led to the failed response to AIDS, where there would be fewer "innocent" victims.

== Critical reception ==
Tim and Pete was met with hostile reviews, primarily for its advocacy of political assassination and terror tactics in combating AIDS discrimination. Baker himself was ambivalent on the subject. "I think assassination does change things ... But I'm not really calling for violence," he said. "It's a novel, not a position paper." In a 1993 interview, however, Baker stated:

I think a strong case can be made that political assassination actually does change things. If you look at the assassinations in this country in the 1960s you can certainly see how it affected history in a very profound way. So if you killed right wing figures, you'd also be altering the course of history, and eliminating people who might very well be president in 1996 and those who are making bashing gays their number one issue right now. On the one hand, I'm not advocating PWA's turn themselves into human bombs, but on the other hand I have to admit that if I clicked on CNN and heard somebody had blown Patrick Buchanan's head clean off, I'd be elated, and to say otherwise would be a lie.

There were also charges of racism, due to his portrayals of blacks and Hispanics. Baker denied those charges, and pointed out that the protagonist later realized that the blacks were also gay and the Latina "was just a sweet old woman putting up with a lot of (stuff) that I couldn't even imagine." He went on to say, "I just wanted to explore the conflicts between gays and Latinos and gays and blacks ... the real feelings [and the] misapprehensions of each other. I realized it wouldn't all be nice and politically correct. If blacks (and Latinos) want my respect, they have to deal with their own homophobia. I'm not playing guilty liberal anymore".

The book caused a great deal of controversy among critics, with some calling it "irresponsible", and saying it was "determined to give offense" and "appears to endorse violence". One critic of the book wrote, "The work rapidly becomes an apology for political terrorism and effectively advocates the assassination of the entire American New Right. While the reasons for such a vengeance motif are perhaps evident, can it really be countenanced? Are we still justified in referring to this as art? And even if we are, is there a point at which such invective (and such suggestions) become simply counterproductive?" Another critic, however, called it "a masterful creation" and wrote: "In coming years Baker will be seen as having understood the implications of this period in our history while the rest of us were simply living it". It polarized the reading public as well, with letters to the editor of major newspapers both supporting and opposing Baker's ideology. Baker himself was aware that the book would be controversial, and deliberately provoked much of the reaction he received. He said: "Tim and Pete tries to convey in print what people really think rather than what they should think or what's P.C. My fantasy was to leave readers so infuriated they'd throw down the book and march right out to a gun store because they wanted to see the finale so bad they realize the only way it'd happen is if they make it happen in real life!"

After the reception of Tim and Pete, with several critics calling him "The Last Angry Gay Man", Baker faced increasing difficulty finding a publisher for his work and his financial position became precarious. He was only able to publish one novella, Right Wing, and that was self-published on the Internet. Baker's life partner, Ron Robertson, believes that this difficulty led Baker on a quick, downwards emotional spiral. Baker committed suicide at his home on November 5, 1997. His death was noted in literary circles and mainstream press; The Gay Times in the United Kingdom wrote, "Baker's suicide is particularly tragic because it robs American gay writing of a refreshingly distinctive voice quite unlike the po-faced prose of so many of his contemporaries."

== Bibliography ==
- Boone, Joseph Allen, Queer frontiers: millennial geographies, genders, and generations, Univ of Wisconsin Press, 2000, ISBN 0-299-16090-4, ISBN 978-0-299-16090-6.
- Eiselein, Gregort, Literature and humanitarian reform in the Civil War era, Indiana University Press, 1996, ISBN 0-253-33042-4, ISBN 978-0-253-33042-0.
- Kruger, Steven F., AIDS narratives: gender and sexuality, fiction and science, Taylor & Francis, 1996, ISBN 0-8153-0925-2, ISBN 978-0-8153-0925-3.
- Lambda Rising, Lambda book report, Volume 8, Issue 5, 1999.
- Sinfield, Alan, On sexuality and power, Columbia University Press, 2004, ISBN 0-231-13408-8, ISBN 978-0-231-13408-8.
- Slide, Anthony, The Hollywood novel: a critical guide to over 1200 works with film-related themes or characters, 1912 through 1994, McFarland & Co., 1995, ISBN 0-7864-0044-7, ISBN 978-0-7864-0044-7.
