= Omar Albertto =

American businessman

- Born: Omar Albertto de La Rossa; 14 September 1957 (age 67); Panama
- Occupation(s): Fashion agent, producer (Founder of Omar's Men and Just Omar - modeling agencies)
- Years active: 1988-until present

Omar Albertto is a figure in the fashion industry. He works as a modeling agent and founder of agencies such as Omar's Men and JustOmar.

Albertto began his career in 1981 as a booker at New York’s L’Image agency, where he gained recognition for his talent in discovering and managing models. In 1987, he moved to California where he headed the men's division of East West. That same year he founded Omar’s Men, which would generate over $1 million in its first year. The agency featured models from countries including the Philippines, Turkey, and Brazil, reflecting Albertto’s early advocacy for multiculturalism in the fashion industry. His work in the 1990s paved the way for greater representation of diverse talents.

Albertto has a reputation for identifying unique and striking talent, with his models appearing in esteemed publications such as L’Uomo Vogue, GQ, Arena, and Esquire. They have also led campaigns for major brands, including Ralph Lauren, Versace, Gucci, Armani, and Dolce & Gabbana. Celebrated photographers such as Bruce Weber, Mario Testino, and Matthew Rolston have collaborated with Albertto, highlighting his skill in curating exceptional talent. Mario Testino once described Albertto’s abilities, noting his "uncanny eye" for spotting standout models.

In addition to his contributions to fashion, Albertto has played a significant role in launching careers in Hollywood. Notable actors like Djimon Hounsou, Antonio Sabàto Jr., and Tyrese Gibson began their professional journeys with his guidance, reflecting the crossover impact of his work on the entertainment industry. Albertto himself gained public recognition when he appeared in a GAP advertisement in Times Square, photographed by Herb Ritts.

Currently, Albertto leads JustOmar, a talent agency focused on nurturing emerging talent. With artists such as Bryant Brown, Chris Theo, Connor Tingley, David Caffrey, and Josie Perez, the agency aims to shape the next generation of fashion and creative professionals. JustOmar also includes a branding division to help models and artists develop their personal brands, further expanding their influence in the industry.

== Agent Career ==
Omar's first job as a modeling booker began in 1981 with New York's L'image agency where he worked with a young Paul Fisher (present-day star of Remodeled on The CW). A couple of years later they both moved to California and found work with EastWest Models. Paul represented the girls division and Omar ran the Men's side of the company. After just over a year Paul left the agency to begin his own firm, It Models.

In 1987, Omar left as well and founded Omar's Men joining Fisher (and It Models) in an adjoined complex in Hollywood's Photo District. According to the Los Angeles Times, the two agents combined gross revenue was $15,000,000 annually. The men's department soon outgrew itself and Albertto opened an East Coast hub of the company out of Herb Ritt's studio office in Manhattan. Omar has since headed the Men's Divisions of the agencies, Warning Model Management, Q Models, and Talent Rock Entertainment and was briefly president of ITN Fashion TV.

On multiple occasions Albertto has cast models in large-scale projects (including Vogue and Dolce & Gabbana) for iconic photographer Mario Testino, who was quoted in Business Wire as saying, "Omar's eye is uncanny, he never misses. He never steers me wrong."

With his latest incarnation, the agency JustOmar, he is presenting new faces, artists and photographers such as; designer/model Bryant Brown, model Chris Theo, artist/model Connor Tingley, artist/model David Caffrey, architect/model Jose Laguna and Los Angeles photographer, Josie Perez. He has also launched a division specifically for product branding.

== The Producer ==
In recent years, Omar Albertto has also begun getting more involved in TV and film production. In 2013, he (and Brian Lewis) produced an independent romantic drama film entitled, Things Never Said, for Ohio Street Pictures. The project starred Shanola Hampton, Omari Hardwick and Elimu Nelson and was written/directed by Charles Murray. The picture had a limited theatrical release in the United States and also appeared on Hulu TV.

In 2016, Omar collaborated with fashion photographer Andrew MacPherson to produce one of the first ever fashion magazine shoots involving an autistic model, in this case, 18 year old RJ Peete (son of football player Rodney Peete and actress Holly Robinson Peete. The images (and Omar in person) later appeared on an airing of the program For Peete's Sake on the Oprah Winfrey Network.

== Modeling ==
In 1977, while attending a party at New York's infamous Studio 54 where he was a regular, nineteen year old Omar was discovered by a scout for Elite Model Management. This was an encounter that changed his life drastically. For the next four years, he worked regularly doing print and runway in Paris, Milan and London. All the while, frequently returning to New York to attend Studio 54 on the weekends. Although never officially retiring as a model, Omar began his first official employment as an agent in 1981 at L'image Models on Madison Avenue.

== Early life ==
Omar Albertto who is non-religious of Bermudan and Jewish-Ethiopian descent, grew up in Panama, where he was born. He was a competitive amateur swimmer between the ages of nine and eighteen, representing Panama as a member of the club, Los Pulpos Da Villa. In 1976 he went to Florida's Disney World on vacation and never returned, defecting to the United States. He graduated from Brooklyn's Midwood High School in 1977.
