= Adrenaline (novel) =

1985 novel by James Robert Baker

- First edition
- Author: James Robert Baker under the pseudonym James Dillinger
- Language: English
- Subject: Gay love, drug use, AIDS, homophobia, hypocrisy of organized religion
- Genre: Gay erotic noir thriller
- Publisher: Signet Books/New American Library (1985), Plume (1988), Alyson Books (2000)
- Publication date: 1985
- Publication place: United States
- Media type: Print (paperback)
- Pages: 302
- ISBN: 0-451-13563-6 (Signet); ISBN 1-555-83565-1 (Alyson Books; reprint)
- OCLC: 12303275
- Followed by: Fuel-Injected Dreams

Adrenaline is the first novel written by James Robert Baker (1946–1997), an American author of sharply satirical, predominantly gay-themed transgressional fiction.

== History ==
After graduating from UCLA, he began his career as a screenwriter, but became disillusioned and started writing novels instead. After the controversy surrounding publication of his novel, Tim and Pete, he faced increasing difficulty having his work published.

Adrenaline was published in 1985 under the pseudonym James Dillinger. A story of two gay fugitive lovers on the run, it presaged the satire and drug fueled violence so prominent in his later books. Here Baker began developing the themes that dominated his following works: anarchy; angry and somewhat paranoid gay men; the dark underside of Los Angeles, juxtaposed with its sunny outward image; the hypocrisy of organized religion; anonymous sex and its implications in the age of AIDS; and homophobia and the oppression of gays in a Republican-dominated America. Its plot device of underdog characters forced into flight due to circumstances beyond their control was one Baker explored in all of his subsequent work.

== Plot summary ==
A native Californian, his work is set almost entirely in Southern California, and the book is about two "lusty" gay lovers from Los Angeles named Nick and Jeff who at the beginning of the novel were having passionate sex when two "wildly homophobic cops" break in on them. They fight back and while trying to defend themselves, they take one cop as hostage. A SWAT team shows up and accidentally kills the cop hostage and blames the two lovers. After that incident the two are on the run from the authorities throughout Los Angeles on the way to Mexico.

== Reviews ==
Planet Out noted the book as an "unapologetic jackhammer of anti-right, anti-homophobe, anti-corporate invective, despised by polite gays, embraced by activist queers, and garnered both hostile reviews and exuberant word-of-mouth." LaBlonte noted it "set the teeth of early AIDS activists on edge." The Los Angeles Times noted it as "over-the-top satire enthusiastically blending humor with rage and violence". James noted "Baker had many issues with the world at large, homophobic cops and preachers along with closeted Hollywood moguls, in particular, and he was able to find satisfaction in his novels that he could not find in real life" stemming from "pent up anger at the homophobic America at elected Ronald Reagan twice and sat by clucking their teeth while so many gay men died of AIDS." Gay Community News noted "he has an eye for the absurd, the quixotic, and the downright existential in pop culture".

== Subsequent works ==
The modest success of the novel encouraged him to devote himself to what have become his best known works, Fuel-Injected Dreams (a novel revolving around a character loosely based on record producer Phil Spector) and Boy Wonder. Though he garnered some fame for his books Fuel-Injected Dreams and Boy Wonder, according to his life partner the move to more mainstream novels instead of writing the fiction he wanted to create were a contributing factor in his suicide.

Posthumously, Baker's work has achieved cult status in the years since his death, and two additional novels have been posthumously published.

As of 2006, first editions of Adrenaline, Boy Wonder, Fuel-Injected Dreams, and Tim and Pete have become collector's items and command high prices at rare book stores. First-edition copies of his earlier works have also become collector's items.
