= Tully Jensen =

American model and actress

- Born: Alicia Tully Jensen; United States
- Other name: Tully
- Occupations: Model, actress

Alicia Tully Jensen is an America model and an actress. She has been on the cover of Playboy, Vogue, Cosmopolitan, Elle, and Mademoiselle magazines.

== Early life and family ==
Jensen, born (youngest of four girls) into a career military home, was raised in Europe and is of English and Scottish descent on her mother's side and of English, Filipino, and Spanish descent on her father's side.

== Career ==
She has appeared in the films One Long Day, Anni 50, The Family Web, Not even the Trees, The Brady Bunch Movie, Inside the Goldmine, and A letter to True. She has also been on the television series Wild Oats and Sex and the City.

== Filmography ==
- Inside the Goldmine (1994) (Emily) (as Alicia Tully Jensen)
- The Brady Bunch Movie (1995) (Model) (as Alicia Tully Jensen)
- Sex and the City (1998) (Yvette)
- Anni '50 (1998) (Martine) (as Alicia Tully Jensen)
- The Family Web (1998) (as Alicia Tully Jensen)
- Not Even the Trees (1998) (as Alicia Tully Jensen)
- One Long Day (2004) (as Alicia Tully Jensen)
