= David Sutcliffe =

Canadian actor (born 1969)

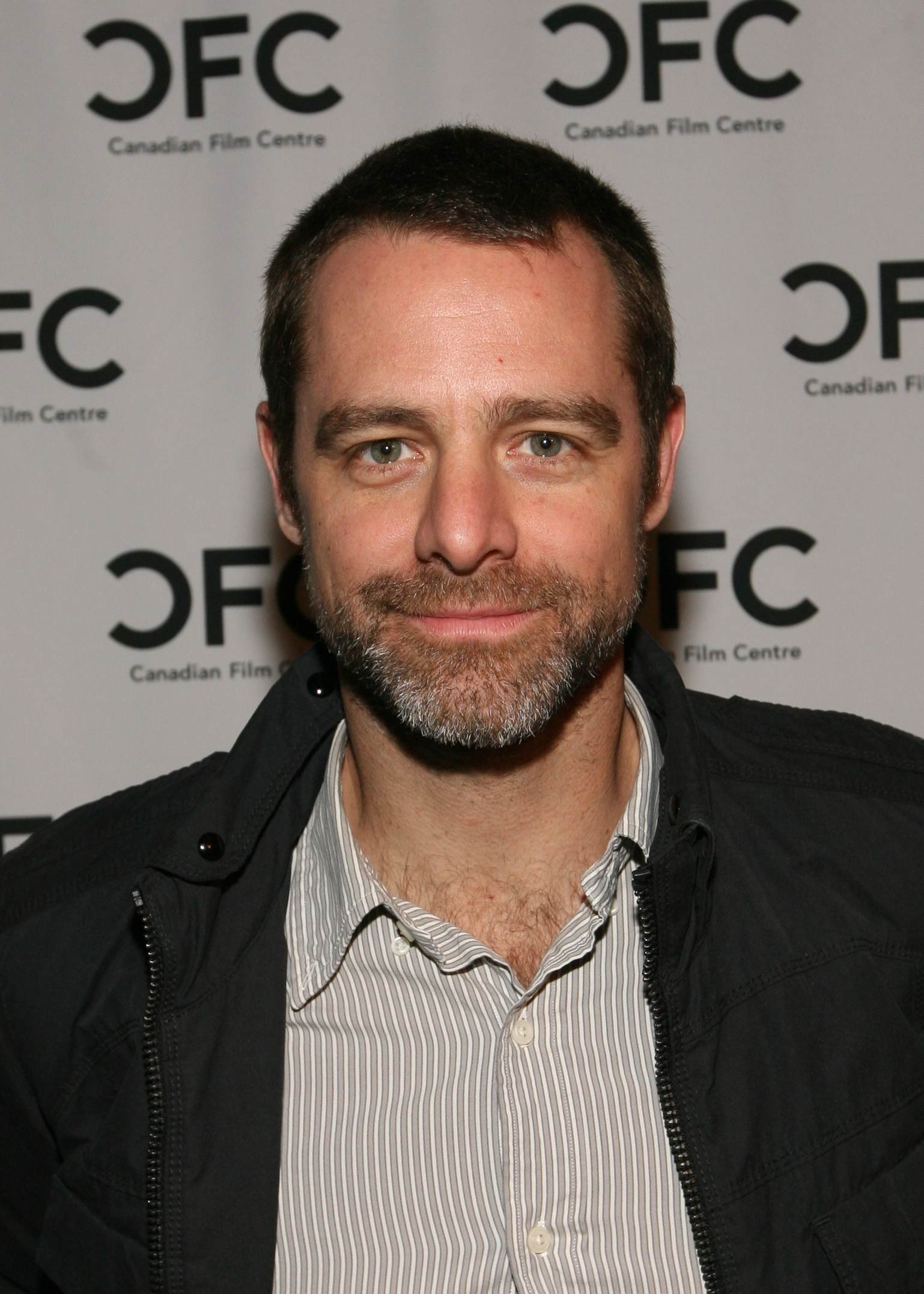
- Sutcliffe in March 2012
- Born: June 8, 1969 (age 57); Saskatoon, Saskatchewan, Canada
- Education: University of Toronto
- Occupation: Actor
- Years active: 1994–2019

David Sutcliffe (born June 8, 1969) is a Canadian former actor. He is known for playing Christopher Hayden on the television series Gilmore Girls and Detective Aidan Black on the television series Cracked.

== Early life ==
Sutcliffe was born in Saskatoon, Saskatchewan, and raised in Grimsby and St. Catharines, Ontario. He studied English literature at Victoria College in the University of Toronto. He was recruited to play varsity basketball at university, but had to give up the sport when he was diagnosed with a herniated disk.

== Career ==
Sutcliffe has appeared in numerous television shows; Patrick Owen on I'm with Her, Christopher Hayden on Gilmore Girls, Officer Kevin Nelson on Private Practice, Detective Aidan Black on Cracked and Dr. Len Barliss on Proof.

He was also in an episode of the show Nancy Drew in 1995, titled "Exile", playing the character of actor Tyler Reed.

Sutcliffe's film work includes Cake, Testosterone, Under the Tuscan Sun, Misconceptions and the television films Murder in the Hamptons and Before You Say I Do.

He also produced and directed the 11-part documentary series Group, about a week-long group therapy retreat.

On May 20, 2019, Sutcliffe announced his retirement from acting via his official Facebook page.

=== Other work ===
David Sutcliffe made a career transition as a Somatic Therapist and Certified Core Energetics Practitioner, and is a graduate of the Radical Aliveness Institute of Southern California. He currently has a private practice in Austin, Texas. He holds workshops and has published material related to his work in emotional mastery and the masculine and feminine dynamics of relationships.

== Charity ==
Sutcliffe played on the World Poker Tour in the Hollywood Home games, for the Hollygrove House charity. In 2013, he helped raise funds in support of children's mental health programs in Toronto.

== Filmography ==
=== Film ===
| Year | Title | Role | Notes |
|---|---|---|---|
| 1997 | Bad Day on the Block | Helicopter observer | |
| 1998 | Half Baked | After school dad | |
| 1998 | Jack & Jill | —N/a | |
| 1999 | Two or Three Words | Ryder | |
| 2003 | Testosterone | Dean Seagrave | |
| 2003 | Under the Tuscan Sun | Ed | |
| 2005 | Happy Endings | Gil Palmer | |
| 2005 | Break a Leg | Happy actor | |
| 2005 | Cake | Ian Grey | |
| 2007 | Hacia la oscuridad | Charlie Bain | Also known as Total Darkness in English |
| 2008 | Inconceivable | Jon Du Bose | |
| 2008 | Misconceptions | Parker Bliss Sr. | |
| 2013 | Hunting Season | Mike Davis | |
| 2016 | Milton's Secret | Bill Adams | |

=== Television ===
| Year | Title | Role | Notes |
|---|---|---|---|
| 1995 | Forever Knight | Fiance | Episode: "Be My Valentine" |
| 1995 | Nancy Drew | Tyler Reed | Episode: "Exile" |
| 1995 | Where's the Money, Noreen? | Satterfield lookalike | Television film |
| 1996 | Night of the Twisters | Farm dad | Television film |
| 1996 | Psi Factor: Chronicles of the Paranormal | Campus cop | Episode: "The Infestation/Human Apportation" |
| 1996 | Holiday Affair | —N/a | Television film |
| 1997 | Melanie Darrow | Carl | Television film |
| 1997 | Fast Track | Marty James | Episode: "The Whole Truth" |
| 1998 | Two of a Kind | Rick | Episode: "First Crush" |
| 1999 | Will & Grace | Campbell | Episode: "Secrets and Lays" |
| 1999 | Cold Feet | Adam Williams | Main role |
| 2000 | Grapevine | Matt Brewer | Main role |
| 2000 | Friends | Kyle | Episode: "The One with the Engagement Picture" |
| 2001–2007 | Gilmore Girls | Christopher Hayden | 36 episodes |
| 2001 | Providence | Russell Banks | Episode: "Love Story" |
| 2001 | CSI: Crime Scene Investigation | Ian Wolf | Episode: "Overload" |
| 2002 | Body & Soul | Barry Matheson | Episode: "The Curse" |
| 2002 | Mutant X | Mark Kearney | Episode: "Body and Soul" |
| 2003 | CSI: Miami | Rick Breck | Episode: "Evidence of Things Unseen" |
| 2003 | The Atwood Stories | Morrison | Episode: "Polarities" |
| 2003 | The Division | Jonah/Dr. Michaelson | 6 episodes |
| 2003–2004 | I'm with Her | Patrick Owen | Main role |
| 2005 | Murder in the Hamptons | Ted Ammon | Television film |
| 2005 | Snow Wonder | Jim | Television film |
| 2005 | His and Her Christmas | Tom Lane | Television film |
| 2007–2009 | Private Practice | Kevin Nelson | 13 episodes |
| 2008 | Sticks and Stones | Neil Martin | Television film |
| 2009 | Before You Say "I Do" | George Murray | Television film |
| 2009 | Accidentally on Purpose | Brian | 2 episodes |
| 2010 | The Wish List | Fred Jones | Television film |
| 2010 | Drop Dead Diva | Charles Ellis | Episode: "The Long Road to Napa" |
| 2010 | Lie to Me | John Stafford | Episode: "Beyond Belief" |
| 2010 | On Strike for Christmas | Stephen Robertson | Television film |
| 2011 | Mega Cyclone | Jason Newmar | Television film |
| 2013 | Cracked | Detective Aidan Black | Main role |
| 2015 | Rookie Blue | Lloyd Hill | Episode: "Perfect Family" |
| 2015 | Proof | Dr. Leonard "Len" Barliss | Main role |
| 2015 | Charming Christmas | Nick | Television film |
| 2016 | Degrassi: Next Class | Himself | Episode: "#NotAllMen" |
| 2016 | The Convenient Groom | Lucas Wright | Television film |
| 2016 | Mistresses | Adam | 5 episodes |
| 2016 | Timeless | Lucy's boss | Episode: "Pilot" |
| 2016 | Gilmore Girls: A Year in the Life | Christopher Hayden | Episode: "Fall" |
| 2016 | Deadly Inferno | Colin | Television film |
| 2017 | Insecure | Isaac | Episode: "Hella Perspective" |
| 2017 | A Man for Every Month | Ben | Television film |
| 2018 | The Romanoffs | Philip Hayward | Episode: "Panorama" |

== Awards and nominations ==
| Year | Award | Category | Work | Result | Ref. |
|---|---|---|---|---|---|
| 2014 | ACTRA Awards | Outstanding Performance – Male | Cracked | Nominated | |
| 2014 | Canadian Screen Awards | Best Performance by an Actor in a Continuing Leading Dramatic Role | Cracked | Nominated | |
| 2015 | Canadian Screen Awards | Best Performance by an Actor in a Continuing Leading Dramatic Role | Cracked | Nominated | |
| 2016 | Golden Maple Awards | Best Actor in a TV Series Broadcast in the U.S. | Proof | Nominated | |
