= List of longest-serving soap opera actors =

Soap operas, a serialised drama produced for radio, television and internet streaming, are specifically and uniquely known for their ensemble casts and long-running characters. Many of these characters have stayed in their respective series for decades, often played by the same actor. The following is a list of the longest-serving actors from soap operas all over the world. It details those actors with ten or more years spent on one year-round or stripped soap opera, despite itinerant breaks and in some cases with the actor portraying multiple roles.

As of 2026, William Roache holds the Guinness World Record for the longest-serving actor in a television soap opera, having played Ken Barlow on Coronation Street since 1960. (Note: Roache took a fifteen month hiatus in 2013–14, while addressing accusations from which he was found not guilty on all charges.)

== Longest-serving soap opera actors worldwide ==
=== Current ===
Country	Rank	Actor	Character	Soap opera	Years	Duration
(United Kingdom)	1	William Roache	Ken Barlow	Coronation Street	1960–2013, 2014–present	65 years
(United Kingdom)	2	Barbara Knox	Rita Tanner	Coronation Street	1964, 1972–present	54 years
(United Kingdom)	3	Brian Hewlett	Neil Carter	The Archers	1973–present	53 years
(United States)	4	Suzanne Rogers	Maggie Horton	Days of Our Lives	1973–1984, 1985–2003, 2004–present	51 years
(United Kingdom)	5	Charles Collingwood	Brian Aldridge	The Archers	1975–present	51 years
(United Kingdom)	6	Patricia Gallimore	Pat Archer	The Archers	1974–2019, 2021–present	50 years
(United States)	7	Susan Seaforth Hayes	Julie Olson Williams	Days of Our Lives	1968–1984, 1990–1994, 1996, 1999–present	47 years
(United States)	8	Melody Thomas Scott	Nikki Newman	The Young and the Restless	1979–present	47 years
(United Kingdom)	9	Trevor Harrison	Eddie Grundy	The Archers	1979–present	47 years
(United States)	10	Eric Braeden	Victor Newman	The Young and the Restless	1980–present	46 years
(United States)	11	Deidre Hall	Marlena Evans; Samantha Evans; Hattie Adams	Days of Our Lives	1976–1987, 1991–2009, 2011–present	44 years
(United States)	12	Kate Linder	Esther Valentine	The Young and the Restless	1982–present	44 years
(United Kingdom)	13	Timothy Bentinck	David Archer	The Archers	1982–present	44 years
(United Kingdom)	14	Charlotte Martin	Susan Carter	The Archers	1982–present	44 years
(United States)	15	James Reynolds	Abe Carver	Days of Our Lives	1981–1990, 1991–2003, 2004–present	43 years
(United Kingdom)	16	Carole Boyd	Fiona Watson; Lynda Snell	The Archers	1967–1969, 1986–present	42 years
(United Kingdom)	17	Sue Nicholls	Audrey Roberts	Coronation Street	1979, 1980–1981, 1982, 1984, 1985–present	42 years
(United Kingdom)	18	Michael Le Vell	Kevin Webster	Coronation Street	1983–2013, 2014–present	42 years
(United Kingdom)	19	Alison Dowling	Elizabeth Pargetter	The Archers	1984–present	42 years
(United Kingdom)	20	Sally Dynevor	Sally Metcalfe	Coronation Street	1986–present	40 years
(United Kingdom)	21	Chris Chittell	Eric Pollard	Emmerdale	1986–present	40 years
(United Kingdom)	22	Adam Woodyatt	Ian Beale	EastEnders	1985–2021, 2022, 2023–present	39 years
(United States)	23	Lauralee Bell	Christine Blair	The Young and the Restless	1983–2006, 2010–present	39 years
(United Kingdom)	24	Felicity Finch	Ruth Archer	The Archers	1987–present	39 years
(United States)	25	Katherine Kelly Lang	Brooke Logan	The Bold and the Beautiful	1987–present	39 years
(United States)	26	John McCook	Eric Forrester	The Bold and the Beautiful	1987–present	39 years
(United States)	27	Jess Walton	Jill Abbott	The Young and the Restless	1987–present	39 years
(United States)	28	Josh Taylor	Chris Kositchek; Roman Brady	Days of Our Lives	1977–1981, 1982–1987, 1997–present	38 years
(Australia)	29	Ray Meagher	Alf Stewart	Home and Away	1988–present	38 years
(United States)	30	Tracey E. Bregman	Lauren Fenmore Baldwin	The Young and the Restless	1983–1995, 2000, 2001–present	37 years
(Republic of Ireland)	31	Tony Tormey	Paul Brennan	Fair City	1989–present	37 years
(United States)	32	Peter Bergman	Jack Abbott	The Young and the Restless	1989–present	37 years
(United Kingdom)	33	Simon Gregson	Steve McDonald	Coronation Street	1989–present	37 years
(Wales)	34	Lisabeth Miles	Megan Harries	Pobol y Cwm	1974–1995, 1996, 2002, 2003, 2011–present	36 years
(United Kingdom)	35	Philip Molloy	Will Grundy	The Archers	1988–1990, 1992–present	36 years
(Wales)	36	Andrew Teilo	Hywel Llywelyn	Pobol y Cwm	1990–present	36 years
(United States)	37	John J. York	Mac Scorpio; James Meadows	General Hospital	1991–present	35 years
(Belgium)	38	Jef De Smedt	Jan Van Den Bossche	Familie	1991–present	35 years
(Belgium)	39	Annie Geeraerts	Anna Dierckx	Familie	1991–present	35 years
(United Kingdom)	40	Steve McFadden	Phil Mitchell	EastEnders	1990–2003, 2005–present	34 years
(Belgium)	41	Ray Verhaeghe	Albert Thielens	Familie	1992–present	34 years
(Republic of Ireland)	42	Martina Stanley	Dolores Molloy	Fair City	1992–present	34 years
(Netherlands)	43	Caroline De Bruijn	Janine Elschot	Goede tijden, slechte tijden	1992–present	34 years
(Germany)	44	Wolfgang Bahro	Jo Gerner	Gute Zeiten, schlechte Zeiten	1993–present	33 years
(Wales)	45	Arwyn Davies	Mark Jones	Pobol y Cwm	1993–present	33 years
(United States)	46	Kristina Wagner	Felicia Scorpio	General Hospital	1984–2003, 2004–2005, 2007–2008, 2012–2014, 2015, 2016–2020, 2021–present	32 years
(United States)	47	Maurice Benard	Sonny Corinthos	General Hospital	1993–1997, 1998–present	32 years
(United States)	48	Joshua Morrow	Nicholas Newman	The Young and the Restless	1994–present	32 years
(United States)	49	Sharon Case	Sharon Collins	The Young and the Restless	1994–present	32 years
(Germany)	50	Karsten Dörr	Bernhard Faller	Die Fallers - Eine Schwarzwaldfamilie	1994–present	32 years
(Germany)	50	Christiane Bachschmidt	Kati Schönfeldt	Die Fallers - Eine Schwarzwaldfamilie	1994–present	32 years

=== All-time ===
Country	Rank	Actor	Character	Soap opera	Years	Duration
(United Kingdom)	1	Patricia Greene	Jill Archer	The Archers	1957–2025	68 years
(United Kingdom)	2	June Spencer	Peggy Woolley; Rita Flynn	The Archers	1950–1953, 1956–1958, 1961–2022	66 years
(United Kingdom)	3	William Roache	Ken Barlow	Coronation Street	1960–2013, 2014–present	65 years
(Poland)	4	Ludmiła Łączyńska	Wisia Matysiakowa	Matysiakowie	1957–2019	62 years
(United Kingdom)	5	Lesley Saweard	Christine Barford	The Archers	1953–1962, 1968–2019	60 years
(United Kingdom)	6	Angela Piper	Jennifer Aldridge	The Archers	1963–2022	59 years
(United Kingdom)	7	Norman Painting	Phil Archer	The Archers	1950–2009	59 years
(United Kingdom)	8	Barbara Knox	Rita Tanner	Coronation Street	1964, 1972–present	54 years
(United Kingdom)	9	Brian Hewlett	Neil Carter	The Archers	1973–present	53 years
(United Kingdom)	10	Eileen Derbyshire	Emily Bishop	Coronation Street	1961, 1962–1966, 1967–2016, 2019	53 years
(United States)	11	Suzanne Rogers	Maggie Horton	Days of Our Lives	1973–1984, 1985–2003, 2004–present	51 years
(United Kingdom)	12	Charles Collingwood	Brian Aldridge	The Archers	1975–present	51 years
(United Kingdom)	13	Judy Bennett	Shula Hebden Lloyd	The Archers	1971–2022, 2023, 2024	51 years
(United Kingdom)	14	Patricia Gallimore	Pat Archer	The Archers	1974–2019, 2021–present	50 years
(United Kingdom)	15	Helen Worth	Gail Chadwick	Coronation Street	1974–2024, 2025	50 years
(United States)	16	Helen Wagner	Nancy Hughes	As the World Turns	1956–1981, 1983, 1985–2010	50 years
(United States)	17	Don Hastings	Bob Hughes	As the World Turns	1960–2010	50 years
(United States)	18	Susan Seaforth Hayes	Julie Olson Williams	Days of Our Lives	1968–1984, 1990–1994, 1996, 1999–present	47 years
(United States)	19	Melody Thomas Scott	Nikki Newman	The Young and the Restless	1979–present	47 years
(United Kingdom)	20	Trevor Harrison	Eddie Grundy	The Archers	1979–present	47 years
(United States)	21	Eileen Fulton	Lisa Grimaldi	As the World Turns	1960–1965, 1966, 1967–1983, 1984–2010	47 years
(United States)	22	Eric Braeden	Victor Newman	The Young and the Restless	1980–present	46 years
(United States)	23	Leslie Charleson	Monica Quartermaine	General Hospital	1977–2023	46 years
(United Kingdom)	24	Colin Skipp	Tony Archer	The Archers	1967–2013	46 years
(United Kingdom)	25	Alan Devereux	Sid Perks	The Archers	1963–2009	46 years
(United Kingdom)	26	Bob Arnold	Tom Forrest	The Archers	1951–1997	46 years
(United States)	27	Deidre Hall	Marlena Evans; Samantha Evans; Hattie Adams	Days of Our Lives	1976–1987, 1991–2009, 2011–present	44 years
(United States)	28	Kate Linder	Esther Valentine	The Young and the Restless	1982–present	44 years
(United Kingdom)	29	Timothy Bentinck	David Archer	The Archers	1982–present	44 years
(United Kingdom)	30	Charlotte Martin	Susan Carter	The Archers	1982–present	44 years
(United States)	31	James Reynolds	Abe Carver	Days of Our Lives	1981–1990, 1991–2003, 2004–present	43 years
(United States)	32	Jacklyn Zeman	Bobbie Spencer	General Hospital	1977–2010, 2013–2023	43 years
(United Kingdom)	33	Carole Boyd	Fiona Watson; Lynda Snell	The Archers	1967–1969, 1986–present	42 years
(United Kingdom)	34	Sue Nicholls	Audrey Roberts	Coronation Street	1979, 1980–1981, 1982, 1984, 1985–present	42 years
(United Kingdom)	35	Michael Le Vell	Kevin Webster	Coronation Street	1983–2013, 2014–present	42 years
(United Kingdom)	36	Alison Dowling	Elizabeth Pargetter	The Archers	1984–present	42 years
(United Kingdom)	37	Terry Molloy	Mike Tucker	The Archers	1974–2015, 2021–2022	42 years
(United States)	38	Doug Davidson	Paul Williams	The Young and the Restless	1978–2020	42 years
(United Kingdom)	39	Arnold Peters	Len Thomas; Harold Gadsby; David Latimer; Sgt Vernon; Major Bigsby; Donald Moore; Jack Woolley	The Archers	1953–1958, 1960–1961, 1962, 1963, 1964, 1965, 1966–1971, 1972, 1973, 1975, 1980–2011	42 years
(United Kingdom)	40	Betty Driver	Betty Williams	Coronation Street	1969–2011	42 years
(United States)	41	Frances Reid	Alice Horton	Days of Our Lives	1965–2007	42 years
(United States)	42	Susan Lucci	Erica Kane	All My Children	1970–2011	41 years
(United States)	43	Erika Slezak	Victoria Lord	One Life to Live	1971–2012, 2013	41 years
(United Kingdom)	44	Sally Dynevor	Sally Metcalfe	Coronation Street	1986–present	40 years
(United Kingdom)	45	Chris Chittell	Eric Pollard	Emmerdale	1986–present	40 years
(United States)	46	Bill Hayes	Doug Williams	Days of Our Lives	1970–1984, 1986–1987, 1993–1994, 1996, 1999–2003, 2004–2024	40 years
(United Kingdom)	47	Anne Kirkbride	Deirdre Barlow	Coronation Street	1972, 1973–1993, 1994–2014	40 years
(United States)	48	Rachel Ames	Audrey Hardy	General Hospital	1964–1965, 1967–1970, 1971–2007, 2009, 2013, 2015	40 years
(United States)	49	Jeanne Cooper	Katherine Chancellor	The Young and the Restless	1973–2013	40 years
(United States)	50	Ray MacDonnell	Joe Martin	All My Children	1970–2010, 2011, 2013	40 years

== Longest serving soap opera actors by country ==
Legend
Former Current

=== Australia ===
Extended content

Actor	Character	Soap Opera	Years	Duration	Reference
Ray Meagher	Alf Stewart	Home and Away	1988–present	38 years	
Lynne McGranger	Irene Roberts	Home and Away	1993–2025	32 years	
Alan Fletcher	Karl Kennedy	Neighbours	1994–2022, 2023–2025	30 years	
Jackie Woodburne	Susan Kennedy	Neighbours	1994–2022, 2023–2025	30 years	
Ryan Moloney	Jarrod "Toadfish" Rebecchi	Neighbours	1995–2022, 2023–2024, 2025	28 years	
Stefan Dennis	Paul Robinson	Neighbours	1985–1992, 1993, 2004–2022, 2023–2025	27 years	
Ada Nicodemou	Leah Patterson	Home and Away	2000–present	26 years	
Tom Oliver	Lou Carpenter	Neighbours	1988, 1992–2016	24 years	
Emily Symons	Marilyn Chambers	Home and Away	1989–1992, 1995–1999, 2001, 2010–present	23 years	
Kate Ritchie	Sally Fletcher	Home and Away	1988–2008, 2013	20 years	
Ian Smith	Harold Bishop	Neighbours	1987–1991, 1996–2009, 2011, 2015, 2022, 2023, 2024–2025	18 years	
Shane Withington	John Palmer	Home and Away	2009–present	17 years	
Georgie Parker	Roo Stewart	Home and Away	2010–present	16 years	
Norman Coburn	Donald Fisher	Home and Away	1988–2003, 2004, 2005, 2007	15 years	
Carla Bonner	Stephanie Scully	Neighbours	1999–2010, 2013, 2015–2018, 2022	14 years	
Kym Valentine	Libby Kennedy	Neighbours	1994–2004, 2005, 2007–2011, 2014, 2022	14 years	
Lyn Collingwood	Colleen Smart	Home and Away	1988, 1989, 1997, 1999–2013	14 years	
John Wood	Tom Croydon	Blue Heelers	1993–2006	13 years	
Julie Nihill	Chris Riley	Blue Heelers	1993–2006	13 years	
Martin Sacks	P. J. Hasham	Blue Heelers	1993–2005	12 years	
Judy Nunn	Ailsa Stewart	Home and Away	1988–2000, 2002, 2003	12 years	
Anne Haddy	Helen Daniels	Neighbours	1985–1997	12 years	
Shane Porteous	Dr. Terence Elliot	A Country Practice	1981–1993	12 years	
Brian Wenzel	Frank Gilroy	A Country Practice	1981–1993	12 years	
Joyce Jacobs	Esme Watson	A Country Practice	1981–1993	12 years	
Rebekah Elmaloglou	Terese Willis	Neighbours	2013–2022, 2023–2025	11 years	
Anne Charleston	Madge Bishop; Agnes Adair	Neighbours	1986–1992, 1996–2001, 2015, 2022, 2025	11 years	
Chris Milligan	Kyle Canning	Neighbours	2008–2016, 2019–2022	11 years	
Judith McGrath	Von Ryan	All Saints	1998–2009	11 years	
Lorrae Desmond	Shirley Gilroy	A Country Practice	1981–1992	11 years	
Gordon Piper	Bob Hatfield	A Country Practice	1981–1992	11 years	
James Stewart	Justin Morgan	Home and Away	2016–present	10 years	
Colette Mann	Sheila Canning	Neighbours	2012–2022	10 years	
Eve Morey	Sonya Rebecchi	Neighbours	2009–2019, 2020, 2022	10 years	
Ryan Clark	Sam Marshall	Home and Away	1991–2001, 2002, 2005	10 years	
Syd Heylen	Vernon 'Cookie' Locke	A Country Practice	1982–1992	10 years	

=== Belgium ===
Extended content

Actor	Character	Soap Opera	Years	Duration	Reference
Jef De Smedt	Jan Van Den Bossche	Familie	1991–present	35 years	
Annie Geeraerts	Anna Dierckx	Familie	1991–present	35 years	
Ray Verhaeghe	Albert Thielens	Familie	1992–present	34 years	
Pol Goossen	Frank Bomans	Thuis	1995–present	31 years	
Annick Segal	Rosa Verbeeck	Thuis	1995–present	31 years	
Marleen Merckx	Simonne Bomans-Backx	Thuis	1995–present	31 years	
Leah Thys	Marianne Bastiaens	Thuis	1995–present	31 years	
Bart Van Avermaet	Waldek Kozinsky	Thuis	2001–present	25 years	
Caroline Maes	Mieke Van Den Bossche	Familie	2002–present	24 years	
Jacky Lafon	Rita Van Den Bossche	Familie	1991–2015, 2024	24 years	
Vanya Wellens	Femke De Grote	Thuis	2002–2013, 2014–present	23 years	
Ann Pira	Nancy De Grote	Thuis	2003–present	23 years	
Gunther Levi	Peter Van Den Bossche	Familie	1999–2022	23 years	
Daan Hugaert	Eddy Van Noteghem	Thuis	2003–2010, 2011–present	22 years	
Monica Van Lierde	Ann De Decker	Thuis	1995–1998, 2001–2020	22 years	
Mark Willems	Luc Bomans	Thuis	1996–2018	22 years	
Janine Bisschops	Jenny Verbeeck	Thuis	1995–2016	21 years	
Silvia Claes	Trudy Tack De Rixart De Waremme	Familie	1998–2018	20 years	
Geert Hunaerts	Peter Vlerick	Thuis	2007–present	19 years	
Peter Bulckaen	Mathias Moelaert	Familie	2008–present	18 years	
Jeroen Lenaerts	Tim Cremers	Thuis	2008–2009, 2010–present	17 years	
Jo Hens	Niko Schuurmans	Familie	2009–present	17 years	
Wim Stevens	Tom De Decker	Thuis	2009–present	17 years	
Martine Jonckheere	Marie-Rose De Putter	Familie	1991–1996, 1998, 2005–2015, 2018–2019, 2021–2022	17 years	
Hilde Van Wesepoel	Linda Desmet	Familie	2001–2017	16 years	
Chris Van Tongelen	Bart Van den Bossche	Familie	2001–2015, 2016, 2017–2018, 2019, 2020, 2021, 2022, 2023, 2024	15 years	
Marc Coessens	Frank Opdebeeck	Wittekerke	1993–2008	15 years	
Greet Rouffaer	Nellie De Donder	Wittekerke	1993–2008	15 years	
Arnold Willems	Georges Coppens	Wittekerke	1993–2008	15 years	
Guido Horckmans	Walter Dierickx	Familie	1991–2006	15 years	
Sandrine André	Veronique Van den Bossche	Familie	2012–present	14 years	
Chris Boni	Yvette De Schrijver	Thuis	2001–2005, 2006–2016	14 years	
Anne Somers	Veronique Van den Bossche	Familie	1991–1994, 2001–2012	14 years	
Peter Bulckaen	Max Moelands	Wittekerke	1994–2008	14 years	
Katrien De Ruysscher	Judith Van Santen	Thuis	2012–2014, 2015–present	13 years	
Werner De Smedt	Rudi Verbiest	Familie	2013–present	13 years	
An Vanderstighelen	Sam De Witte	Thuis	2013–present	13 years	
Lawful Bardad-Daidj	Adil Baykal	Thuis	2013–present	13 years	
Walter Moeremans	Leo Vertonghen	Thuis	2008–2021	13 years	
Vicky Versavel	Brenda Vermeir	Familie	1997–2002, 2003–2011	13 years	
Steph Goossens	Cois Pelkmans	Thuis	1997–2010	13 years	
Raf Jansen	Dieter Van Art	Thuis	2014–present	12 years	
Jan Van den Bosch	Zjef de Mulder	Familie	2013–2025	12 years	
Sarah-Lynn Clerckx	Louise Van den Bossche	Familie	2006–2018	12 years	
Erik Goris	Rob Gerrits	Familie	1999–2011	12 years	
Noureddine Farihi	Mo Fawzi	Thuis	1999–2011	12 years	
Kristine Perpête	Els D'Hollander	Familie	1998–2010	12 years	
Patsy Van der Meeren	Marie van Goethem	Thuis	1998–2008, 2025–present	11 years	
Lut Hannes	Angèle Backx	Thuis	1998–1999, 2003–2006, 2015–2018, 2019–2023	11 years	
Sally-Jane Van Horenbeeck	Peggy Verbeeck	Thuis	1995–1997, 1998–1999, 2000, 2002, 2006, 2008–2016, 2018	11 years	
Chris Deleu	Marthe Vermeir	Familie	1997–2008, 2011	11 years	
Jens Gruyaert	Jelle Van den Bossche	Familie	2006–2017	11 years	
Alex Van Haecke	Peter Olivier	Wittekerke	1997–2008	11 years	
Barbara Bracke	Elke Baertsoen	Familie	1997–2008	11 years	
Riet van Gool	Monique Maeterlinck	Familie	1991–2002	11 years	
Ludo Hellinx	Patrick Pauwels	Familie	2012–2022, 2023	10 years	
Hilde Gijsbrechts	Elke Bran	Wittekerke	1998–2008	10 years	
Ron Cornet	Jean-Paul Derdeyn	Wittekerke	1998–2008	10 years	
Dirk Meynendonckx	René D'Hollander	Familie	1997–2007	10 years	
Peter Van Asbroeck	Werner van Sevenant	Thuis	1997–2007	10 years	
Nathalie Wijnants	Eva Verbist	Thuis	1997–2007	10 years	
Marijke Hofkens	Leontien Vercammen-Bomans	Thuis	1997–2007	10 years	

=== Canada ===
Extended content

Actor	Character	Soap Opera	Years	Duration	Reference
Chantal Fontaine	Virginie Boivin	Virginie	1996–2008, 2010	12 years	
Jean L'Italien	Bernard Paré	Virginie	1996–2002, 2004–2010	12 years	
Monique Chabot	Cécile Boivin	Virginie	1996–2008, 2010	12 years	
Joëlle Morin	Cathy Laurendeau	Virginie	1998–2010	12 years	
JiCi Lauzon	Pierre Lacaille	Virginie	1997–2006, 2008–2010	11 years	
Julie Vincent	Dominique Latrelle	Virginie	1996–2007, 2010	11 years	
Jacques L'Heureux	Julien Constantin	Virginie	1996–2007, 2010	11 years	
Pascale Desrochers	Louise Pouliot	Virginie	2000–2010	10 years	
Claude Blanchard	Pierre Boivin	Virginie	1996–2006	10 years	

=== Czech Republic ===
Extended content

Actor	Character	Soap Opera	Years	Duration	Reference
Václav Svoboda	Lumír Nykl	Ulice	2005–present	21 years	
Rudolf Hrušínský Jr.	Vlastimil Pešek	Ulice	2005–present	21 years	
Ilona Svobodová	Jitka Farská	Ulice	2005–present	21 years	
Daniel-Fleischer Brown	Henry Rettig	Ulice	2005–present	21 years	
Ljuba Krbová	Anna Málková-Lišková	Ulice	2005–present	21 years	
Petr Rychlý	Čestmír Mázl	Ordinace v růžové zahradě	2005–present	21 years	
Ivana Jirešová	Lucie Vágnerová	Ordinace v růžové zahradě	2005–present	21 years	
Petr Vacek	Tomáš Jordán	Ulice	2005–2023, 2024–present	20 years	
Ladislav Ondřej	Jakub Mázl	Ordinace v růžové zahradě	2005–2021, 2022–present	20 years	
Zlata Adamovská	Běla Páleníková-Valšíková	Ordinace v růžové zahradě	2006–present	20 years	
Radim Fiala	Petr Hanák	Ordinace v růžové zahradě	2007–present	19 years	
Vlastimil Zavřel	Jindřich Valšík	Ordinace v růžové zahradě	2007–present	19 years	
Jaroslava Obermaierová	Vilma Nyklová	Ulice	2005–2024	19 years	
Kryštof Rímský	Kryštof Mareček	Ulice	2006, 2008–present	18 years	
Dana Morávková	Zdena Suchá	Ordinace v růžové zahradě	2008–present	18 years	
Petr Štěpánek	Eduard Valšík	Ordinace v růžové zahradě	2008–present	18 years	
Matyáš Valenta	František Hruby	Ulice	2006–2024	18 years	
Aneta Krejčíková	Gabriela Pumrová	Ulice	2005–2018, 2022–present	17 years	
Martin Hofmann	Jaroslav Hejl	Ulice	2005–2022	17 years	
Adrian Jastraban	Bedrich Liška	Ulice	2005–2022	17 years	
Jan Čenský	David Suchý	Ordinace v růžové zahradě	2010–present	16 years	
Barbora Štěpánová	Babeta Hessová	Ordinace v růžové zahradě	2010–present	16 years	
Patricie Solaříková	Tereza Jordanová	Ulice	2005–2018, 2024–present	15 years	
Martin Stránský	Ota Kovář	Ordinace v růžové zahradě	2009–2013, 2015–present	15 years	
Martin Zounar	Bohdan Švarc	Ordinace v růžové zahradě	2011–present	15 years	
Tereza Bebarová	Světlana Lisečko-Nyklová	Ulice	2005–2020	15 years	
Jakub Štáfek	Matěj Jordán	Ulice	2005–2019, 2024	14 years	
Ha Thanh Špetlíková	Tien Nguyen	Ordinace v růžové zahradě	2013–present	13 years	
Dana Syslová	Amálie Seidlová-Pešková	Ulice	2010–2023	13 years	
Michal Novotný	Darek Vágner	Ordinace v růžové zahradě	2009–2022	13 years	
Zdena Hadrbolcová	Růžena Habartová	Ulice	2005–2006, 2008–2020	13 years	
Hana Holišová	Veronika Maléřová	Ulice	2014–present	12 years	
Anna Fixová	Monika Farská	Ulice	2005–2016, 2023–2024	12 years	
Ondřej Pavelka	Oldřich Farský	Ulice	2005–2016	11 years	
Jana Birgusová	Lída Farská- Kostková	Ulice	2005–2016	11 years	
Pavla Tomicová	Simona Blahova-Hlozankova	Ulice	2007–2017	10 years	
Michaela Badinková	Lenka Drápalová-Hejlová	Ulice	2005–2015	10 years	

=== England ===
Extended content

Actor	Character	Soap Opera	Years	Duration	Secondary Appearances	Reference
Patricia Greene	Jill Archer	The Archers	1957–2025	68 years		
June Spencer	Peggy Woolley; Rita Flynn	The Archers	1950–1953, 1956–1958, 1961–2022	66 years		
William Roache	Ken Barlow	Coronation Street	1960–2013, 2014–present	65 years		
Lesley Saweard	Christine Barford	The Archers	1953–1962, 1968–2019	60 years		
Angela Piper	Jennifer Aldridge	The Archers	1963–2022	59 years		
Norman Painting	Phil Archer	The Archers	1950–2009	59 years		
Barbara Knox	Rita Tanner	Coronation Street	1964, 1972–present	54 years		
Brian Hewlett	Neil Carter	The Archers	1973–present	53 years		
Eileen Derbyshire	Emily Bishop	Coronation Street	1961, 1962–1966, 1967–2016, 2019	53 years		
Charles Collingwood	Brian Aldridge	The Archers	1975–present	51 years		
Judy Bennett	Shula Hebden Lloyd	The Archers	1971–2022, 2023, 2024	51 years		
Patricia Gallimore	Pat Archer	The Archers	1974–2019, 2021–present	50 years		
Helen Worth	Gail Chadwick	Coronation Street	1974–2024, 2025	50 years		
Trevor Harrison	Eddie Grundy	The Archers	1979–present	47 years		
Colin Skipp	Tony Archer	The Archers	1967–2013	46 years		
Alan Devereux	Sid Perks	The Archers	1963–2009	46 years		
Bob Arnold	Tom Forrest	The Archers	1951–1997	46 years		
Timothy Bentinck	David Archer	The Archers	1982–present	44 years		
Charlotte Martin	Susan Carter	The Archers	1982–present	44 years		
Carole Boyd	Fiona Watson; Lynda Snell	The Archers	1967–1969, 1986–present	42 years		
Sue Nicholls	Audrey Roberts	Coronation Street	1979, 1980–1981, 1982, 1984, 1985–present	42 years		
Michael Le Vell	Kevin Webster	Coronation Street	1983–2013, 2014–present	42 years		
Terry Molloy	Mike Tucker	The Archers	1974–2015, 2021–2022	42 years		
Betty Driver	Betty Williams	Coronation Street	1969–2011	42 years		
Arnold Peters	Len Thomas; Harold Gadsby; David Latimer; Sgt Vernon; Major Bigsby; Donald Moore; Jack Woolley	The Archers	1953–1958, 1960–1961, 1962, 1963, 1964, 1965, 1966–1971, 1972, 1973, 1975, 1980–2011	42 years		
Alison Dowling	Elizabeth Pargetter	The Archers	1984–2025, 2026–present	41 years		
Sally Dynevor	Sally Metcalfe	Coronation Street	1986–present	40 years		
Chris Chittell	Eric Pollard	Emmerdale	1986–present	40 years		
Anne Kirkbride	Deirdre Barlow	Coronation Street	1972, 1973–1993, 1994–2014	40 years		
Adam Woodyatt	Ian Beale	EastEnders	1985–2021, 2022, 2023–present	39 years	EastEnders: E20 (2010)	
Felicity Finch	Ruth Archer	The Archers	1987–present	39 years		
Derek Thompson	Charlie Fairhead	Casualty	1986–2024, 2026	38 years	Holby City (1999, 2005, 2010, 2012); Holby Blue (2007)	
Simon Gregson	Steve McDonald	Coronation Street	1989–present	37 years		
Sara Coward	Caroline Sterling	The Archers	1979–2016	37 years		
Philip Molloy	Will Grundy	The Archers	1988–1990, 1992–present	36 years		
Graham Blockey	Robert Snell	The Archers	1986–2022	36 years		
Chris Gittins	Walter Gabriel	The Archers	1953–1988	35 years		
Steve McFadden	Phil Mitchell	EastEnders	1990–2003, 2005–present	34 years		
Hedli Niklaus	Eva Coverdale; Kathy Perks	The Archers	1978–1981, 1984–2015, 2022	34 years		
Edward Kelsey	Joe Grundy	The Archers	1985–2019	34 years		
Pauline Seville	Polly Perkins	The Archers	1951–1959, 1963, 1965–1990	33 years		
Liz Dawn	Vera Duckworth	Coronation Street	1974, 1976–2008, 2010	32 years		
David Neilson	Roy Cropper	Coronation Street	1995–present	31 years		
Nick Pickard	Tony Hutchinson	Hollyoaks	1995–present	31 years		
Graham Roberts	George Barford	The Archers	1973–2004	31 years		
Buffy Davis	Jolene Archer	The Archers	1996–present	30 years		
Mark Charnock	Marlon Dingle	Emmerdale	1996–present	30 years		
Jimmy McKenna	Jack Osborne	Hollyoaks	1996–present	30 years		
June Brown	Dot Branning	EastEnders	1985–1993, 1997–2012, 2013–2020	30 years	EastEnders: E20 (2011)	
Richard Thorp	Alan Turner	Emmerdale	1982–2009, 2010–2013	30 years		
Johnny Briggs	Mike Baldwin	Coronation Street	1976–2006	30 years		
Pamela Craig	Betty Tucker	The Archers	1974–2004	30 years		
Letitia Dean	Sharon Watts	EastEnders	1985–1995, 2001–2006, 2012–present	29 years		
Souad Faress	Usha Franks	The Archers	1994–2018, 2021–present	29 years		
Dominic Brunt	Paddy Dingle	Emmerdale	1997–present	29 years		
Gwen Berryman	Doris Archer	The Archers	1951–1980	29 years		
Michael Lumsden	Alistair Lloyd	The Archers	1998–present	28 years		
Alan Halsall	Tyrone Dobbs	Coronation Street	1998–present	28 years		
Ian Pepperell	Roy Tucker	The Archers	1995–2023	28 years		
Bill Tarmey	Jack Duckworth	Coronation Street	1979, 1981, 1982–2010	28 years		
Bryan Mosley	Alf Roberts	Coronation Street	1961, 1962, 1963, 1967, 1971–1999	28 years		
James Hooton	Sam Dingle	Emmerdale	1995–1996, 1997–1998, 2000, 2001–present	27 years		
Annabelle Dowler	Kirsty Miller	The Archers	1999–present	27 years		
Jimmi Harkishin	Dev Alahan	Coronation Street	1999–present	27 years		
Clive Hornby	Jack Sugden	Emmerdale	1980–1988, 1989–2008	27 years		
Anne Cullen	Carol Tregorran	The Archers	1954–1981, 1982, 1983, 1984	27 years		
Perry Fenwick	Billy Mitchell	EastEnders	1998, 1999, 2000–present	26 years	EastEnders: E20 (2010)	
Barry Farrimond	Ed Grundy	The Archers	2000–present	26 years		
Jack P. Shepherd	David Platt	Coronation Street	2000–present	26 years		
Joanna Van Kampen	Fallon Rogers	The Archers	2000–present	26 years		
Richard Attlee	Kenton Archer	The Archers	2000–present	26 years		
Louiza Patikas	Helen Archer	The Archers	2000–present	26 years		
Tony Audenshaw	Bob Hope	Emmerdale	2000–present	26 years		
Patrick Mower	Rodney Blackstock	Emmerdale	2000–present	26 years		
Andy Whyment	Kirk Sutherland	Coronation Street	2000–present	26 years		
Michael Cochrane	Oliver Sterling	The Archers	2000–present	26 years		
Pam St Clement	Pat Evans	EastEnders	1986–2012, 2016, 2025	26 years		
Gillian Taylforth	Kathy Beale	EastEnders	1985–1998, 1999–2000, 2015–present	25 years		
Sunny Ormonde	Lilian Bellamy	The Archers	2001–present	25 years		
Ryan Kelly	Jazzer McCreary	The Archers	2001–present	26 years		
Hollie Chapman	Alice Carter	The Archers	2001–present	25 years		
Rudolph Walker	Patrick Trueman	EastEnders	2001–present	25 years	EastEnders: E20 (2010)	
Sue Cleaver	Eileen Grimshaw	Coronation Street	2000–2025	25 years		
Natalie Cassidy	Sonia Fowler	EastEnders	1993–2007, 2010, 2011, 2014–2025	25 years		
Steve Halliwell	Zak Dingle	Emmerdale	1994, 1995–2002, 2003–2018, 2019, 2020–2023	25 years		
Julie Goodyear	Bet Lynch	Coronation Street	1966, 1970–1995, 2002, 2003	25 years		
Mollie Harris	Martha Woodford	The Archers	1970–1995	25 years		
Jane Danson	Leanne Battersby	Coronation Street	1997–2000, 2004–2006, 2007–present	24 years		
Ashley Taylor Dawson	Darren Osborne	Hollyoaks	1999–2000, 2003–present	24 years		
Samia Longchambon	Maria Connor	Coronation Street	2000–2009, 2010–2015, 2016–present	24 years		
Nicola Wheeler	Nicola King	Emmerdale	2001–2006, 2007–present	24 years		
Charlotte Bellamy	Laurel Thomas	Emmerdale	2002–present	24 years		
Rosalind Adams	Clarrie Grundy	The Archers	1988–2012	24 years		
Jeff Stewart	Reg Hollis	The Bill	1984–2008	24 years		
Jane Rossington	Jill Richardson	Crossroads	1964–1988, 2001	24 years		
Thelma Barlow	Mavis Wilton	Coronation Street	1971, 1972, 1973–1997	24 years		
Jack Howarth	Albert Tatlock	Coronation Street	1960–1984	24 years		
Jeff Hordley	Cain Dingle	Emmerdale	2000–2006, 2009–present	23 years		
Lucy Pargeter	Chas Dingle	Emmerdale	2002, 2003–present	23 years		
Andrew Wincott	Adam Macy	The Archers	2003–present	23 years		
John Telfer	Alan Franks	The Archers	2003–present	23 years		
Sam Aston	Chesney Winter-Brown	Coronation Street	2003–present	23 years		
Stephen Kennedy	Ian Craig	The Archers	2003–present	23 years		
Beverley Callard	Liz McDonald	Coronation Street	1989–1998, 2000–2001, 2003, 2004–2010, 2011, 2013–2020	23 years		
Eric Allan	Bert Fry	The Archers	1997–2020	23 years		
Trudie Goodwin	June Ackland	The Bill	1983, 1984–2007	23 years		
Stan Richards	Seth Armstrong	Emmerdale	1978, 1979, 1980–2003, 2004	23 years		
Jean Alexander	Hilda Ogden	Coronation Street	1964–1987	23 years		
Doris Speed	Annie Walker	Coronation Street	1960–1983	23 years		
Mary Dalley	Pru Forrest	The Archers	1956–1979, 1982	23 years		
Leslie Dunn	Paul Johnson	The Archers	1954–1977	23 years		
Emma Atkins	Charity Dingle	Emmerdale	2000–2005, 2009–present	22 years		
Jennie McAlpine	Fiz Dobbs	Coronation Street	2001–2014, 2015–2018, 2019–2023, 2024–present	22 years		
Antony Cotton	Sean Tully	Coronation Street	2003, 2004–present	22 years		
Nick Miles	Jimmy King	Emmerdale	2004–2026	22 years		
Jane Cox	Lisa Dingle	Emmerdale	1996–2018, 2019, 2020, 2024	22 years		
Elizabeth Estensen	Diane Sugden	Emmerdale	1999–2021, 2022	22 years		
Graham Seed	Nigel Pargetter	The Archers	1983–1986, 1992–2011	22 years		
Graham Cole	Tony Stamp	The Bill	1987–2009	22 years		
Peter Adamson	Len Fairclough	Coronation Street	1961–1983	22 years		
Stephanie Waring	Cindy Cunningham	Hollyoaks	1996–2001, 2002, 2004, 2008–2024, 2026–present	21 years		
Kate Ford	Tracy Barlow	Coronation Street	2002–2007, 2010–present	21 years		
Jessica Fox	Nancy Osborne	Hollyoaks	2005–present	21 years		
Eden Taylor-Draper	Belle Dingle	Emmerdale	2005–present	21 years		
Ellis Hollins	Tom Cunningham	Hollyoaks	2003–2024, 2025	21 years		
Sheila Mercier	Annie Sugden	Emmerdale	1972–1992, 1993–1994, 1995, 1996, 2009	21 years		
Mark Wingett	Jim Carver	The Bill	1983, 1984–2005, 2007	21 years		
Wendy Richard	Pauline Fowler	EastEnders	1985–2006	21 years		
Susan Hanson	Diane Parker	Crossroads	1966–1987	21 years		
Pat Phoenix	Elsie Tanner	Coronation Street	1960–1973, 1976–1984	21 years		
Grace Allardyce	Mrs Maggs	Mrs Dale's Diary	1948–1969	21 years		
Dorothy Lane	Mrs Freeman	Mrs Dale's Diary	1948–1969	21 years		
Laila Morse	Mo Harris	EastEnders	2000–2015, 2016, 2018–2021, 2022, 2024–present	20 years	EastEnders: E20 (2010)	
Diane Parish	Denise Fox	EastEnders	2006–present	20 years		
Isabel Hodgins	Victoria Sugden	Emmerdale	2006–present	20 years		
Malcolm Hebden	Norris Cole	Coronation Street	1994–1996, 1997, 1999–2017, 2019, 2020	20 years		
John Middleton	Ashley Thomas	Emmerdale	1996–1997, 1998–2017, 2018	20 years		
Sean Wilson	Martin Platt	Coronation Street	1985–2005, 2018	20 years		
Kelvin Fletcher	Andy Sugden	Emmerdale	1996–2016	20 years		
Margot Boyd	Marjorie Antrobus	The Archers	1984–2004	20 years		
Ronald Magill	Amos Brearly	Emmerdale	1972–1992, 1993, 1994, 1995	20 years		
Frazer Hines	Joe Sugden	Emmerdale	1972–1983, 1984–1985, 1986–1994	20 years		
Elizabeth Marlowe	Lilian Bellamy	The Archers	1961–1977, 1979–1981, 1982, 1989–1991	20 years		
George Hart	Jethro Larkin	The Archers	1967–1987	20 years		
Bernard Youens	Stan Ogden	Coronation Street	1964–1984	20 years		
Denis Folwell	Jack Archer	The Archers	1950–1951, 1952–1971	20 years		
Heather Bell	Clarrie Grundy	The Archers	1979–1985, 2013–present	19 years		
Tina O'Brien	Sarah Platt	Coronation Street	1999–2007, 2015–present	19 years		
Jennifer Metcalfe	Mercedes McQueen	Hollyoaks	2006–2017, 2018–present	19 years		
Alison King	Carla Connor	Coronation Street	2006–2016, 2017–present	19 years		
Jamie Borthwick	Jay Brown	EastEnders	2006–2025	19 years		
Adrian Lewis Morgan	Jimmi Clay	Doctors	2005–2024	19 years		
Sid Owen	Ricky Butcher	EastEnders	1988–2000, 2002–2004, 2008–2012, 2022–2023	19 years		
Kevin Kennedy	Curly Watts	Coronation Street	1983–1998, 1999–2003	19 years		
Jack May	Nelson Gabriel	The Archers	1956, 1962, 1963, 1965–1966, 1968, 1970–1971, 1972, 1975, 1977, 1979–1995, 1996–1997	19 years		
Arthur Pentelow	Henry Wilks	Emmerdale	1972–1991	19 years		
Violet Carson	Ena Sharples	Coronation Street	1960–1977, 1978–1980	19 years		
Jessie Wallace	Kat Moon	EastEnders	2000–2004, 2005, 2010–2016, 2018–present	18 years	Kat & Alfie: Redwater (2017)	
Kieron Richardson	Ste Hay	Hollyoaks	2006, 2007–2019, 2020–present	18 years		
Mikey North	Gary Windass	Coronation Street	2008–present	18 years		
Gabrielle Dowling	Cathy Hope	Emmerdale	2007–2025	18 years		
Hugh Quarshie	Ric Griffin	Holby City	2001–2006, 2007–2020, 2022	18 years	Casualty (2004, 2005, 2017, 2019)	
Paula Tilbrook	Betty Eagleton	Emmerdale	1994–2003, 2004–2011, 2012–2014, 2015	18 years		
Simon Rouse	Jack Meadows	The Bill	1990, 1991, 1992–2010	18 years		
Lynne Perrie	Ivy Brennan	Coronation Street	1971–1972, 1974, 1975, 1976, 1977–1994	18 years		
Philip Garston-Jones	Mr Sproggett; Jack Woolley	The Archers	1955–1956, 1962–1979	18 years		
Courtney Hope	Agatha Turvey	The Archers	1954–1958, 1960–1974	18 years		
Claire King	Kim Tate	Emmerdale	1989–1999, 2018, 2019–present	17 years		
Scott Maslen	Jack Branning	EastEnders	2007–2013, 2015–present	17 years	EastEnders: E20 (2011)	
Patti Clare	Mary Taylor	Coronation Street	2008–2009, 2010–present	17 years		
Alfie Clarke	Arthur Thomas	Emmerdale	2009–present	17 years		
Natalie J. Robb	Moira Dingle	Emmerdale	2009–present	17 years		
Chris Bisson	Jai Sharma	Emmerdale	2009–present	17 years		
Tanisha Gorey	Asha Alahan	Coronation Street	2009–present	17 years		
Jack Downham	Noah Dingle	Emmerdale	2009–2026	17 years		
John Rowe	Jim Lloyd	The Archers	2007–2008, 2009–2025	17 years		
Lesley Dunlop	Brenda Walker	Emmerdale	2008–2025	17 years		
Ian Bleasdale	Josh Griffiths	Casualty	1989–2006, 2007, 2016, 2017, 2024	17 years	Holby City (2004, 2005)	
Sebastian Dowling	Heath Hope	Emmerdale	2007–2024	17 years		
Matthew Wolfenden	David Metcalfe	Emmerdale	2006–2023	17 years		
Rosie Marcel	Jac Naylor	Holby City	2005–2022	17 years	Casualty (2016, 2018, 2019)	
Charley Webb	Debbie Dingle	Emmerdale	2002–2016, 2017–2019, 2020–2021	17 years		
Meg Johnson	Pearl Ladderbanks	Emmerdale	2003–2020	17 years		
Kim Durham	Matt Crawford	The Archers	1997–2014, 2017	17 years		
Tom Graham	Tom Archer	The Archers	1997–2014	17 years		
Deena Payne	Viv Hope	Emmerdale	1993–2008, 2009–2011	17 years		
Eric Richard	Bob Cryer	The Bill	1984–2001, 2002, 2003, 2004	17 years		
Frederick Pyne	Matt Skilbeck	Emmerdale	1972–1989	17 years		
Noele Gordon	Meg Richardson	Crossroads	1964–1981, 1983	17 years		
Hilary Newcombe	Polly Perks	The Archers	1964–1981	17 years		
Georgia Taylor	Toyah Battersby	Coronation Street	1997–2003, 2016–present	16 years		
Zoë Henry	Rhona Goskirk	Emmerdale	2001, 2002, 2010–present	16 years		
Gillian Wright	Jean Slater	EastEnders	2004, 2005, 2006–2013, 2014, 2015–2016, 2017, 2018–present	16 years		
Grace	Janet Mitchell	EastEnders	2006–2010, 2011, 2014–present	16 years		
Ben Price	Nick Tilsley	Coronation Street	2009–2017, 2018–present	16 years		
Emerald O'Hanrahan	Emma Grundy	The Archers	2010–present	16 years		
Elle Mulvaney	Amy Barlow	Coronation Street	2010–present	16 years		
Shona McGarty	Whitney Dean	EastEnders	2008–2024, 2026	16 years		
Alex Fletcher	Diane Hutchinson	Hollyoaks	2010–2026	16 years		
Lacey Turner	Stacey Slater	EastEnders	2004–2010, 2014–2019, 2020–2025	16 years		
Ryan Thomas	Jason Grimshaw	Coronation Street	2000–2016, 2025	16 years		
Rebecca Bakes	Angelica King	Emmerdale	2009–2025	16 years		
Amy Shindler	Brenda Tucker	The Archers	1999–2015, 2024	16 years		
Alex Bain	Simon Barlow	Coronation Street	2008–2024	16 years		
Chris Gascoyne	Peter Barlow	Coronation Street	2000–2003, 2007, 2008–2014, 2015, 2016–2023	16 years		
Matthew Chambers	Daniel Granger	Doctors	2007–2023	16 years		
Linda Henry	Shirley Carter	EastEnders	2006–2022	16 years	EastEnders: E20 (2010)	
Cathy Shipton	Lisa "Duffy" Duffin	Casualty	1986–1993, 1998–2003, 2006, 2015, 2016–2020	16 years	Holby City (1999)	
Billy Hartman	Terry Woods	Emmerdale	1995–2011	16 years		
Malandra Burrows	Kathy Brookman	Emmerdale	1985–2001, 2005	16 years		
Leah Bracknell	Zoe Tate	Emmerdale	1989–2005	16 years		
Peter Ellis	Charles Brownlow	The Bill	1984–2000, 2002	16 years		
Ronald Allen	David Hunter	Crossroads	1969–1985	16 years		
Margot Bryant	Minnie Caldwell	Coronation Street	1960–1976	16 years		
Kay Hudson	Mabel Larkin	The Archers	1957–1973	16 years		
Nicole Barber-Lane	Myra McQueen	Hollyoaks	2006–2019, 2024–present	15 years		
Jake Wood	Max Branning	EastEnders	2006–2015, 2016–2021, 2025–present	15 years		
Tameka Empson	Kim Fox	EastEnders	2009, 2010–2019, 2020–present	15 years	EastEnders: E20 (2011)	
Joe-Warren Plant	Jacob Sugden	Emmerdale	2010–2020, 2021–present	15 years		
Roxy Shahidi	Leyla Harding	Emmerdale	2008–2011, 2013–2025	15 years		
Elisabeth Dermot Walsh	Zara Carmichael	Doctors	2009–2024	15 years		
Chris Walker	Rob Hollins	Doctors	2009–2024	15 years		
Sarah Jayne Dunn	Mandy Richardson	Hollyoaks	1996–2006, 2007, 2008, 2010–2011, 2013, 2017–2021	15 years		
Brooke Vincent	Sophie Webster	Coronation Street	2004–2019	15 years		
Shirley Stelfox	Edna Birch	Emmerdale	2000–2015	15 years		
Julie Hesmondhalgh	Hayley Cropper	Coronation Street	1998–2007, 2008–2014	15 years		
Dean Sullivan	Jimmy Corkhill	Brookside	1986, 1987, 1988–2003	15 years		
Ben Roberts	Derek Conway	The Bill	1987–2002	15 years		
Warren Jackson	Nick Tilsley	Coronation Street	1981–1996	15 years		
Richard Carrington	Richard Adamson	The Archers	1973–1988	15 years		
Ysanne Churchman	Grace Archer; Mrs Elliot; Mary Pound	The Archers	1952–1955, 1971–1983	15 years		
Gwenda Wilson	Laura Archer	The Archers	1962–1977	15 years		
Ellis Powell	Mrs Dale	Mrs Dale's Diary	1948–1963	15 years		
Shane Richie	Alfie Moon	EastEnders	2002–2005, 2010–2016, 2018–2019, 2022–present	14 years	Kat & Alfie: Redwater (2017)	
Emma Barton	Honey Mitchell	EastEnders	2005–2008, 2014, 2015–present	14 years		
Danny Miller	Aaron Dingle	Emmerdale	2008–2012, 2014–2021, 2022, 2023–present	14 years		
Anna Passey	Sienna Blake	Hollyoaks	2012–present	14 years		
Charlie Wrenshall	Liam Connor Jr.	Coronation Street	2012–present	14 years		
Charlie Behan	Charlie Dean	Hollyoaks	2011–2024, 2025–2026	14 years		
James Sutton	John Paul McQueen	Hollyoaks	2006–2008, 2012–2017, 2019–2026	14 years		
Sally Ann Matthews	Jenny Connor	Coronation Street	1986–1991, 1993, 2015, 2016–2025	14 years		
Colson Smith	Craig Tinker	Coronation Street	2011–2025	14 years		
Sam Hall	Samson Dingle	Emmerdale	2010–2024	14 years		
Jan Pearson	Karen Hollins	Doctors	2009–2023	14 years		
Helen Pearson	Frankie Osborne	Hollyoaks	2002–2015, 2016–2017	14 years		
Barbara Windsor	Peggy Mitchell	EastEnders	1994–2003, 2004, 2005–2010, 2013, 2014, 2015, 2016	14 years		
Annelise Manojlovic	Gabby Thomas	Emmerdale	2001–2015	14 years		
Vicky Entwistle	Janice Battersby	Coronation Street	1997–2011	14 years		
Steven Arnold	Ashley Peacock	Coronation Street	1995, 1996–2010	14 years		
Mary Wimbush	Lady Isabel Lander; Julia Pargetter	The Archers	1969–1970, 1992–2005	14 years		
Paul Usher	Barry Grant	Brookside	1982–1995, 1997–1998, 2003	14 years	Hollyoaks (2025)	
Diane Burke	Katie Rogers	Brookside	1989–2003	14 years		
Peter Amory	Chris Tate	Emmerdale	1989–2003	14 years		
Gareth Armstrong	Mike Tucker; Harry Booker; Sean Myerson	The Archers	1973–1983, 1996–2000	14 years		
Brian Regan	Terry Sullivan	Brookside	1982–1994, 1995–1997	14 years		
Bill Waddington	Percy Sugden	Coronation Street	1983–1997	14 years		
Richard Derrington	Mark Hebden	The Archers	1980–1994	14 years		
Roger Tonge	Sandy Richardson	Crossroads	1964–1967, 1970–1981	14 years		
Jack Haig	Archie Gibbs	Crossroads	1967–1981	14 years		
Thea Wells	Isabel Fielding	Mrs Dale's Diary	1948–1962	14 years		
Susie Riddell	Kate Aldridge; Tracy Horrobin	The Archers	1990–1994, 2011–2012, 2013, 2017, 2018–present	13 years		
Sam Robertson	Adam Barlow	Coronation Street	2004–2007, 2016–present	13 years		
Cherylee Houston	Izzy Armstrong	Coronation Street	2010–2020, 2021, 2022, 2023–present	13 years		
William Beck	Dylan Keogh	Casualty	2011–2012, 2014–present	13 years	Holby City (2012)	
Joe Duttine	Tim Metcalfe	Coronation Street	2013–present	13 years		
Kellie Bright	Linda Carter	EastEnders	2013–2027	13 years		
Tamsin Greig	Debbie Aldridge	The Archers	1991–2003, 2004, 2007, 2008, 2009, 2010, 2011–2012, 2013, 2015, 2016, 2018, 2020, 2023, 2026	13 years		
Samantha Giles	Bernice Blackstock	Emmerdale	1998–2002, 2004, 2012–2019, 2021–2023, 2025	13 years		
Patsy Palmer	Bianca Jackson	EastEnders	1993–1999, 2002, 2008–2014, 2019, 2024–2025	13 years		
Nikki Sanderson	Maxine Minniver	Hollyoaks	2012–2025	13 years		
Daisy Campbell	Amelia Spencer	Emmerdale	2011–2024	13 years		
Ela-May Demircan	Leah Barnes	Hollyoaks	2011–2024	13 years		
Lisa George	Beth Sutherland	Coronation Street	2011–2024	13 years		
Tony Marshall	Noel Garcia	Casualty	2008–2021	13 years	Holby City (2017, 2019)	
Kym Marsh	Michelle Connor	Coronation Street	2006–2019	13 years		
Helen Flanagan	Rosie Webster	Coronation Street	2000–2012, 2017–2018	13 years		
Sammy Winward	Katie Sugden	Emmerdale	2001–2005, 2006–2015	13 years		
Maggie Jones	Blanche Hunt	Coronation Street	1974–1976, 1977, 1978, 1981, 1996, 1997, 1998–2009	13 years		
Vince Earl	Ron Dixon	Brookside	1990–2003	13 years		
Alexandra Fletcher	Jacqui Farnham	Brookside	1990–2003	13 years		
Paul Byatt	Mike Dixon	Brookside	1990–2003	13 years		
Todd Carty	Mark Fowler	EastEnders	1990–2003	13 years		
Andrew Paul	Dave Quinnan	The Bill	1989–2002	13 years		
Heather Barrett	Dorothy Adamson	The Archers	1975–1988	13 years		
Edgar Harrison	Dan Archer	The Archers	1969–1982	13 years		
Jack Holloway	Tony Stobeman; Ralph Bellamy	The Archers	1957, 1962, 1964–1977, 1979	13 years		
Basil Jones	John Tregorran	The Archers	1953–1965, 1976–1977	13 years		
Joy Andrews	Tish Hope	Crossroads	1967–1980	13 years		
Jack Howarth	Mr Maggs	Mrs Dale's Diary	1948–1961	13 years		
Lisa Riley	Mandy Dingle	Emmerdale	1995–2000, 2001, 2019–present	12 years		
Peter Gunn	Brian Packham	Coronation Street	2010, 2011–2013, 2015, 2016–present	12 years		
Kirsty-Leigh Porter	Leela Dexter	Hollyoaks	2013–2020, 2021–present	12 years		
James Cartwright	Harrison Burns	The Archers	2014–present	12 years		
Jonny McPherson	Liam Cavanagh	Emmerdale	2014–present	12 years		
Amelia Flanagan	April Windsor	Emmerdale	2014–present	12 years		
Sair Khan	Alya Nazir	Coronation Street	2014–present	12 years		
Daisy Badger	Pip Archer	The Archers	2014–present	12 years		
David Troughton	Tony Archer	The Archers	2014–present	12 years		
Simon Williams	Justin Elliott	The Archers	2014–present	12 years		
William Troughton	Tom Archer	The Archers	2014–present	12 years		
Perdita Avery	Kate Madikane	The Archers	2014–present	12 years		
Angus Imrie	Josh Archer	The Archers	2014–2026	12 years		
Daniel Brocklebank	Billy Mayhew	Coronation Street	2014–2026	12 years		
Lucy Morris	Phoebe Aldridge	The Archers	2010–2022, 2025	12 years		
Ruby O'Donnell	Peri Lomax	Hollyoaks	2013–2025	12 years		
Diane Langton	Nana McQueen	Hollyoaks	2007–2008, 2009, 2012–2015, 2016–2024	12 years		
Ian Midlane	Al Haskey	Doctors	2012–2024	12 years		
Liam Fox	Dan Spencer	Emmerdale	2011–2023	12 years		
Bhasker Patel	Rishi Sharma	Emmerdale	2011–2023	12 years		
Ellie Leach	Faye Windass	Coronation Street	2011–2023	12 years		
Fiona Wade	Priya Kotecha	Emmerdale	2011–2023	12 years		
Jaye Jacobs	Donna Jackson	Holby City	2004–2011, 2017–2022	12 years	Casualty (2004, 2005, 2010, 2019, 2023)	
Bob Barrett	Sacha Levy	Holby City	2010–2022	12 years	Casualty (2019, 2023)	
Suzanne Packer	Tess Bateman	Casualty	2003–2015, 2016, 2021	12 years	Holby City (2004, 2005)	
Charles Lawson	Jim McDonald	Coronation Street	1989–2000, 2003, 2004, 2005, 2007–2008, 2009, 2010, 2011, 2014, 2018	12 years		
Freddie Jones	Sandy Thomas	Emmerdale	2005–2008, 2009–2018	12 years		
Lorna Fitzgerald	Abi Branning	EastEnders	2006–2018	12 years		
Darren Jeffries	Sam "O.B." O'Brien	Hollyoaks	1997–2008, 2016–2017	12 years		
Kellie Bright	Kate Madikane	The Archers	1995–2002, 2005–2007, 2009–2012	12 years		
Steven Pinder	Max Farnham	Brookside	1990–1998, 1999–2003	12 years		
Tony O'Callaghan	Matt Boyden	The Bill	1991–2003	12 years	Murder Investigation Team (2003)	
Colin Tarrant	Andrew Monroe	The Bill	1990–2002	12 years		
Louis Emerick	Mick Johnson	Brookside	1989–2001	12 years	Hollyoaks (2024–present)	
Amanda Barrie	Alma Halliwell	Coronation Street	1981, 1982, 1988, 1989–2001	12 years		
Christopher Smith	Robert Sugden	Emmerdale	1989–2001	12 years		
Michael Starke	Sinbad	Brookside	1984, 1985, 1987, 1988–2000	12 years	Hollyoaks (2021, 2025, 2026)	
Lynsay King	Sarah-Louise Platt	Coronation Street	1987–1999	12 years		
Jill Summers	Phyllis Pearce	Coronation Street	1982–1983, 1984–1993, 1994–1996	12 years		
Toke Townley	Sam Pearson	Emmerdale	1972–1984	12 years		
John Bentley	Hugh Mortimer	Crossroads	1965–1977	12 years		
Jennifer Moss	Lucille Hewitt	Coronation Street	1960–1961, 1962–1969, 1970–1974	12 years		
Bill Payne	Ned Larkin	The Archers	1956–1968	12 years		
Jorgie Porter	Theresa McQueen	Hollyoaks	2008–2016, 2020–2022, 2024, 2025–present	11 years		
Michael Stevenson	Iain Dean	Casualty	2012, 2013–2019, 2021–present	11 years	Holby City (2016, 2017, 2019, 2021)	
Laura Norton	Kerry Pollard	Emmerdale	2012–2020, 2021–2022, 2023, 2024–present	11 years		
Michelle Hardwick	Vanessa Woodfield	Emmerdale	2012–2020, 2021–2022, 2024–present	11 years		
Amy Walsh	Tracy Robinson	Emmerdale	2014–2022, 2023–2026	11 years		
Arayah Harris-Buckle	Pearl Fox	EastEnders	2015–present	11 years		
Charles Venn	Jacob Masters	Casualty	2015–present	11 years		
Freddie Phillips	Will Mitchell	EastEnders	2015–present	11 years		
Charlie Brooks	Janine Carter	EastEnders	1999–2004, 2008–2012, 2013–2014, 2021–2022, 2026	11 years	EastEnders: E20 (2011)	
Tamara Wall	Grace Black	Hollyoaks	2013–2023, 2024–2025	11 years		
Shelley King	Yasmeen Metcalfe	Coronation Street	2014–2025	11 years		
James Bye	Martin Fowler	EastEnders	2014–2025	11 years		
Dido Miles	Emma Reid	Doctors	2012–2023, 2024	11 years		
Laurie Brett	Jane Beale	EastEnders	2004–2012, 2014–2017, 2024	11 years	EastEnders: E20 (2010)	
Macy Alabi	Ruby Dobbs	Coronation Street	2012–2023	11 years		
Dean Gaffney	Robbie Jackson	EastEnders	1993–2003, 2004, 2010, 2015, 2017–2018, 2019	11 years		
Nitin Ganatra	Masood Ahmed	EastEnders	2007–2016, 2017–2019	11 years	EastEnders: E20 (2010, 2011)	
Charlie Hardwick	Val Pollard	Emmerdale	2004–2015, 2017	11 years		
Derek Martin	Charlie Slater	EastEnders	2000–2011, 2013, 2016	11 years		
Verity Rushworth	Donna Windsor	Emmerdale	1998–2009, 2014	11 years		
Tina Hobley	Chrissie Williams	Holby City	2001–2008, 2009–2013	11 years	Casualty (2005)	
Matt Littler	Max Cunningham	Hollyoaks	1997–2008	11 years		
James Alexandrou	Martin Fowler	EastEnders	1996–2007	11 years		
Lisa Geoghan	Polly Page	The Bill	1992–2002, 2003–2004	11 years		
Tony Adams	Adam Chance	Crossroads	1978–1988, 2001–2002	11 years		
Glenda McKay	Rachel Hughes	Emmerdale	1988–1999	11 years		
Gladys Ambrose	Julia Brogan	Brookside	1985–1988, 1989, 1990–1998	11 years		
Sam Barriscale	John Archer	The Archers	1987–1998	11 years		
Jon Peyton Price	Martin Fowler	EastEnders	1985–1996	11 years		
Bill Treacher	Arthur Fowler	EastEnders	1985–1996	11 years		
Hugh Manning	Donald Hinton	Emmerdale	1977–1979, 1980–1989, 1993	11 years		
Jean Rogers	Dolly Skilbeck	Emmerdale	1980–1991	11 years		
Christopher Quinten	Brian Tilsley	Coronation Street	1978–1989	11 years		
Ann George	Amy Turtle	Crossroads	1965–1976, 1987	11 years		
Pamela Vezey	Kath Brownlow	Crossroads	1976–1987	11 years		
Elisabeth Croft	Miss Tatum	Crossroads	1965–1976, 1977, 1978, 1979, 1983	11 years		
Edward Cast	Mike Nash	Waggoner's Walk	1969–1980	11 years		
Ellen McIntosh	Claire Nash	Waggoner's Walk	1969–1980	11 years		
Basil Moss	Peter Tyson	Waggoner's Walk	1969–1980	11 years		
Lockwood West	Arthur Tyson	Waggoner's Walk	1969–1980	11 years		
Michael Spice	Matt Prior	Waggoner's Walk	1969–1980	11 years		
Judy Franklin	Lynn Prior	Waggoner's Walk	1969–1980	11 years		
Julia Mark	Nora McAuley	The Archers	1966–1977	11 years		
Arnold Ridley	Doughy Hood	The Archers	1956–1958, 1961–1970, 1973	11 years		
Michelle Collins	Cindy Beale	EastEnders	1988–1990, 1992–1996, 1997–1998, 2023–present	10 years		
Jamie Lomas	Warren Fox	Hollyoaks	2006–2009, 2010–2011, 2016–2017, 2018, 2019, 2020–2024, 2025–present	10 years		
Dolly-Rose Campbell	Gemma Winter-Brown	Coronation Street	2014, 2015, 2016–present	10 years		
Nick Barber	Rex Fairbrother	The Archers	2015–2023, 2024–present	10 years		
Rosie Bentham	Gabby Thomas	Emmerdale	2016–present	10 years		
Kyran Bowes	Jack Webster	Coronation Street	2016–present	10 years		
Karen Blick	Lydia Dingle	Emmerdale	2016–present	10 years		
Rob Mallard	Daniel Osbourne	Coronation Street	2016–present	10 years		
Julia Goulding	Shona Platt	Coronation Street	2016–present	10 years		
Toby Laurence	Freddie Pargetter	The Archers	2016–present	10 years		
Shaun Williamson	Barry Evans	EastEnders	1994–2004, 2025	10 years		
Rita Simons	Roxy Mitchell	EastEnders	2007–2017, 2019, 2023	10 years		
Amanda Henderson	Robyn Miller	Casualty	2013–2023	10 years	Holby City (2017, 2018, 2019)	
Paul Bradley	Elliot Hope	Holby City	2005–2015, 2019, 2022	10 years	Casualty (2010, 2012, 2014)	
Harry McDermott	Max Turner	Coronation Street	2010–2020	10 years		
Duncan Preston	Douglas Potts	Emmerdale	2007–2011, 2014–2020	10 years		
Zennon Ditchett	Aadi Alahan	Coronation Street	2009–2019	10 years		
Leonard Fenton	Dr. Harold Legg	EastEnders	1985–1991, 1992, 1993, 1994–1997, 2000, 2004, 2007, 2018–2019	10 years		
Jane Hazlegrove	Kathleen "Dixie" Dixon	Casualty	2006–2016, 2019	10 years	Holby City (2006, 2015)	
Owen Brenman	Heston Carter	Doctors	2008–2018	10 years		
Debbie Rush	Anna Windass	Coronation Street	2008–2018	10 years		
Lorraine Coady	Hayley Tucker	The Archers	2006–2016	10 years		
Philip Lowrie	Dennis Tanner	Coronation Street	1960–1962, 1963–1968, 2011–2014	10 years		
Carley Stenson	Steph Roach	Hollyoaks	2000–2010, 2011	10 years		
John Bardon	Jim Branning	EastEnders	1996, 1999–2007, 2008, 2009–2011	10 years		
Bruce Jones	Les Battersby	Coronation Street	1997–2007	10 years		
John Savident	Fred Elliott	Coronation Street	1994, 1995–1996, 1997–2006	10 years		
Mike Reid	Frank Butcher	EastEnders	1987, 1988–1994, 1995–1996, 1997–2000, 2002, 2005	10 years		
Neville Buswell	Ray Langton	Coronation Street	1966, 1968–1978, 2005	10 years		
Tiffany Chapman	Rachel Dixon	Brookside	1993–2003	10 years		
Sue Jenkins	Jackie Corkhill	Brookside	1991–2001	10 years		
Gretchen Franklin	Ethel Skinner	EastEnders	1985–1992, 1993, 1994–1997, 2000	10 years		
Thomas Ormson	David Platt	Coronation Street	1990–2000	10 years		
Huw Higginson	George Garfield	The Bill	1989–1999, 2000	10 years		
Cy Chadwick	Nick Bates	Emmerdale	1985, 1986–1996, 1999	10 years		
Kevin Lloyd	Tosh Lines	The Bill	1988–1998	10 years		
Geoff Hinsliff	Don Brennan	Coronation Street	1987–1997	10 years		
Roger Hume	John Tregorran; Bert Fry	The Archers	1979–1981, 1988–1996	10 years		
Susan Tully	Michelle Fowler	EastEnders	1985–1995	10 years		
Tracy Jane White	Lucy Perks	The Archers	1982–1992	10 years		
Graham Rigby	Zebedee Tring; Bert Gibbs	The Archers	1961, 1962, 1964, 1966–1974, 1975–1977	10 years		
Philip Morant	John Tregorran	The Archers	1965–1975	10 years		
Arthur Leslie	Jack Walker	Coronation Street	1960–1970	10 years		
Tommy Duggan	Fred Barratt	The Archers	1960–1970	10 years		
Harry Oakes	Dan Archer	The Archers	1950–1960	10 years		

=== Finland ===
Extended content

Actor	Character	Soap Opera	Years	Duration	Reference
Esko Kovero	Ismo Laitela	Salatut elämät	1999–present	27 years	
Maija-Liisa Peuhu	Ulla Taalasmaa	Salatut elämät	1999–2007, 2010, 2013–2020, 2021–2024	18 years	
Timo Jurkka	Lasse Sievinen	Salatut elämät	2004–2012, 2013–2015, 2019–present	17 years	
Jukka Puotila	Pertti Mäkimaa	Kotikatu	1995–2012	17 years	
Ville Keskilä	Teemu Luotola	Kotikatu	1995–2012	17 years	
Lena Meriläinen	Eeva Virtanen	Kotikatu	1995–2012	17 years	
Anitta Niemi	Karin Luotola	Kotikatu	1995–2012	17 years	
Misa Nirhamo	Janne Mäkimaa	Kotikatu	1995–2012	17 years	
Tiina Rinne	Maija Mäkimaa	Kotikatu	1995–2012	17 years	
Pete Lattu	Kalle Laitela	Salatut elämät	1999–2001, 2002, 2012–present	16 years	
Tommi Taurula	Kari Taalasmaa	Salatut elämät	1999, 2001–2004, 2005, 2007–2010, 2014, 2015–2018, 2019–present	16 years	
Jarmo Koski	Seppo Taalasmaa	Salatut elämät	1999–2013, 2017, 2020–2021, 2023–2024	16 years	
Sami Uotila	Aki Nikkinen	Salatut elämät	1999–2002, 2014–present	15 years	
Pirjo Moilanen	Laura Mäkimaa	Kotikatu	1995–2003, 2006–2012	14 years	
Aake Kalliala	Mauri Alho	Kotikatu	1998–2012	14 years	
Teemu Lehtilä	Aaro Vaalanne; Eero Vanala; Iiro Hansen	Salatut elämät	2004–2006, 2007–2009, 2012, 2015, 2017–present	13 years	
Petteri Jamalainen	Hessu Pennanen	Kotikatu	1996–2009	13 years	
Mikko Parikka	Jiri Viitamäki	Salatut elämät	2010–2020, 2024–present	12 years	
Linda Liikka	Kerttu Söder	Kotikatu	2000–2012	12 years	
Anu Palevaara	Jenni Vainio	Salatut elämät	1999–2001, 2002–2011, 2012–2013	12 years	
Markku Pulli	Joonatan Sievinen	Salatut elämät	2007–2010, 2011–2015, 2021–2025	11 years	
Risto Autio	Hannes Luotola	Kotikatu	1995–2006, 2007, 2012	11 years	
Sulevi Peltola	Onni Partanen	Kotikatu	1999–2009, 2011–2012	11 years	
Eeva Litmanen	Anja Partanen	Kotikatu	1999–2010	11 years	
Inka Kallén	Mirja Mäkimaa	Kotikatu Uusi päivä	1995–2003, 2005, 2007–2009, 2011–2012	11 years	
Hanna Kinnunen	Salla Taalasmaa	Salatut elämät	2006–2010, 2019, 2020–present	10 years	
Johanna Nurmimaa	Paula Sievinen	Salatut elämät	2004–2012, 2013–2014, 2018–2019, 2022	10 years	
Laura Malmivaara	Tuija Kangasharju	Kotikatu	2002–2012	10 years	

=== France ===
Extended content

Actor	Character	Soap Opera	Years	Duration	Reference
Cécilia Hornus	Blanche Marci	Plus belle la vie	2004–2022	18 years	
Sylvie Flepp	Mirta Torres	Plus belle la vie	2004–2022	18 years	
Serge Dupire	Vincent Chaumette	Plus belle la vie	2004–2022	18 years	
Michel Cordes	Roland Marci	Plus belle la vie	2004–2022	18 years	
Rebecca Hampton	Céline Frémont	Plus belle la vie	2004–2022	18 years	
Anne Decis	Luna Torres	Plus belle la vie	2004–2022	18 years	
Alexandre Fabre	Charles Frémont	Plus belle la vie	2004–2022	18 years	
Laurent Kerusoré	Thomas Marci	Plus belle la vie	2005–2022	17 years	
Élodie Varlet	Estelle Cantorel	Plus belle la vie	2006–2022	16 years	
Fabienne Carat	Samia Nassri	Plus belle la vie	2005–2021	16 years	
Thibaud Vaneck	Nathan Leserman	Plus belle la vie	2005–2012, 2014–2022	15 years	
Stéphane Henon	Jean-Paul Boher	Plus belle la vie	2007–2022	15 years	
Pierre Martot	Léo Castelli	Plus belle la vie	2004–2011, 2015–2022	14 years	
Marwan Berreni	Abdel Fedala	Plus belle la vie	2009–2022	13 years	
Léa François	Barbara Évenot	Plus belle la vie	2009–2022	13 years	
Rachid Hafassa	Karim Fedala	Plus belle la vie	2009–2022	13 years	
Anne Canovas	Anémone Vitreuil	Plus belle la vie	2009–2010, 2011–2022	12 years	
Caroline Bourg	Elsa Bailly	Plus belle la vie	2010–2022	12 years	
Avy Marciano	Sacha Malkavian	Plus belle la vie	2010–2022	12 years	
Virgil Bayle	Guillaume Leserman	Plus belle la vie	2005–2017, 2022	12 years	
Jean-Charles Chagachbanian	Franck Ruiz	Plus belle la vie	2007–2010, 2014–2022	15 years	
Joakim Latzko	Gabriel Riva	Plus belle la vie	2011–2022	11 years	
Ludovic Baude	Benoît Cassagne	Plus belle la vie	2008–2018	10 years	
Dounia Coesens	Johanna Marci	Plus belle la vie	2004–2014, 2018, 2019, 2022	10 years	
Aurélie Vaneck	Ninon Chaumette	Plus belle la vie	2004–2014, 2019, 2022	10 years	
Jean-François Malet	Jean-François Leroux	Plus belle la vie	2006–2016	10 years	
Ambroise Michel	Rudy Torres	Plus belle la vie	2004–2014, 2022	10 years	

=== Germany ===
Extended content

Actor	Character	Soap Opera	Years	Duration	Reference
Andrea Spatzek	Gabi Zenker	Lindenstraße	1985–2020	35 years	
Marie-Luise Marjan	Helga Beimer	Lindenstraße	1985–2020	35 years	
Moritz A. Sachs	Klaus Beimer	Lindenstraße	1985–2020	35 years	
Hermes Hodolides	Vasily Sarikakis	Lindenstraße	1985–2020	35 years	
Sybille Waury	Tanja Schildknecht	Lindenstraße	1985–2020	35 years	
Amorn Surangkanjanajai	Gung Pham Kien	Lindenstraße	1985–2020	35 years	
Ludwig Haas	Ludwig Dressler	Lindenstraße	1985–2019, 2020	34 years	
Wolfgang Bahro	Jo Gerner	Gute Zeiten, schlechte Zeiten	1993–present	33 years	
Joachim Hermann Luger	Hans Beimer	Lindenstraße	1985–2018, 2020	33 years	
Karsten Dörr	Bernhard Faller	Die Fallers - Eine Schwarzwaldfamilie	1994–present	32 years	
Christiane Bachschmidt	Kati Schönfeldt	Die Fallers - Eine Schwarzwaldfamilie	1994–present	32 years	
Roland Frey	Toni Willmann	Die Fallers - Eine Schwarzwaldfamilie	1994–present	32 years	
Friedrich Graumann	Schorsch Huber	Die Fallers - Eine Schwarzwaldfamilie	1994–present	32 years	
Wolfgang Hepp	Hermann Faller	Die Fallers - Eine Schwarzwaldfamilie	1994–2026	32 years	
Thomas Meinhardt	Heinz Faller	Die Fallers - Eine Schwarzwaldfamilie	1995–present	31 years	
Lisbeth Felder	Lioba Weber	Die Fallers - Eine Schwarzwaldfamilie	1995–present	31 years	
Adelheid Theil	Claudia Heilert	Die Fallers - Eine Schwarzwaldfamilie	1995–present	31 years	
Christoph Hagin	Dieter Weiss	Die Fallers - Eine Schwarzwaldfamilie	1995–present	31 years	
Isabell Hertel	Ute Weigel	Unter uns	1995–present	31 years	
Georg Uecker	Carsten Flöter	Lindenstraße	1986–1992, 1995–2020	31 years	
Irene Fischer	Anna Ziegler	Lindenstraße	1987–2013, 2015–2020	31 years	
Anne von Linstow	Monique Guiton	Die Fallers - Eine Schwarzwaldfamilie	1994–2019, 2021–present	30 years	
Edgar M Marcus	Franz Faller	Die Fallers - Eine Schwarzwaldfamilie	1994–2008, 2009–2019, 2020, 2021–present	29 years	
Heidi Vogel-Reinsch	Leni Riedlinger	Die Fallers - Eine Schwarzwaldfamilie	1995–2018, 2020–present	29 years	
Jo Bolling	Andy Zenker	Lindenstraße	1990–1992, 1993–2020	29 years	
Sontje Peplow	Lisa Dağdelen	Lindenstraße	1991–2020	29 years	
Thomas Rühmann	Roland Heilmann	In aller Freundschaft	1998–present	28 years	
Alexa Maria Surholt	Sarah Marquardt	In aller Freundschaft	1998–present	28 years	
Karsten Kühn	Jakob Heilmann	In aller Freundschaft	1998–present	28 years	
Ursula Cantieni	Johanna Faller	Die Fallers - Eine Schwarzwaldfamilie	1994–2022	28 years	
Peter Schell	Karl Faller	Die Fallers - Eine Schwarzwaldfamilie	1994–2022	28 years	
Rebecca Siemoneit-Barum	Iffi Zenker	Lindenstraße	1990–2012, 2014–2020	28 years	
Julia Stark	Sarah Ziegler	Lindenstraße	1987–2003, 2004–2016, 2018	28 years	
Domna Adamopoulou	Elena Sarikakis	Lindenstraße	1985–1996, 1997–2013, 2014–2015	28 years	
Andrea Kathrin Loewig	Kathrin Globisch	In aller Freundschaft	1999–present	27 years	
Christiane Brammer	Bea Faller	Die Fallers - Eine Schwarzwaldfamilie	2000–present	26 years	
Alessio Hirschkorn	Albert Guiton	Die Fallers - Eine Schwarzwaldfamilie	2000–present	26 years	
Knut Hinz	Hajo Scholz	Lindenstraße	1990–2016	26 years	
Miloš Vuković	Paco Weigel	Unter uns	2000–2018, 2019–present	25 years	
Dominik Stricker	Sebastian Wenzel	Die Fallers - Eine Schwarzwaldfamilie	2001–present	25 years	
Birgit Bücker	Margarete Markhardt-Siegel	Die Fallers - Eine Schwarzwaldfamilie	2001–present	25 years	
Arzu Bazman	Arzu Ritter	In aller Freundschaft	2001–present	25 years	
Thomas Koch	Philipp Ernst Brentano	In aller Freundschaft	2001–present	25 years	
Petra Blossey	Irene Weigel	Unter uns	1994–2019, 2026-present	25 years	
Felix von Jascheroff	John Bachmann	Gute Zeiten, schlechte Zeiten	2001–2014, 2015–present	24 years	
Moritz Zielke	Momo Sperling	Lindenstraße	1992–2001, 2002–2017, 2020	24 years	
Bill Mockridge	Erich Schiller	Lindenstraße	1991–2015, 2016	24 years	
Ulrike Frank	Katrin Flemming	Gute Zeiten, schlechte Zeiten	2002–2003, 2004–present	23 years	
Marianne Rogée	Isolde Pavarotti	Lindenstraße	1986–2009, 2010, 2011, 2019	23 years	
Anne Menden	Emily Wiedmann	Gute Zeiten, schlechte Zeiten	2004–present	22 years	
Johannes Scheit	Tom Ziegler	Lindenstraße	1989–2011, 2012, 2013, 2018	22 years	
Hermann Ruhr	Ludwig Leiser	Die Fallers - Eine Schwarzwaldfamilie	1994–2016	22 years	
Jörn Schlönvoigt	Philip Höfer	Gute Zeiten, schlechte Zeiten	2004–2021, 2022–present	21 years	
Lars Steinhöfel	Easy Winter	Unter uns	2005–present	21 years	
Janina Flieger	Sophie Kramer	Die Fallers - Eine Schwarzwaldfamilie	2005–present	21 years	
Julia Obst	Jenny Faller	Die Fallers - Eine Schwarzwaldfamilie	2005–present	21 years	
Dirk Galuba	Werner Saalfeld	Sturm der Liebe	2005–present	21 years	
Sepp Schauer	Alfons Sonnbichler	Sturm der Liebe	2005–present	21 years	
Antje Hagen	Hildegard Sonnbichler	Sturm der Liebe	2005–present	21 years	
Daniel Fehlow	Leon Moreno	Gute Zeiten, schlechte Zeiten	1996–1998, 1999, 2001–2004, 2005–2021, 2022, 2023	21 years	
Sara Turchetto	Marcella Varese	Lindenstraße	1998–2001, 2002–2020	21 years	
Erkan Gündüz	Murat Dağdelen	Lindenstraße	1999–2020	21 years	
Ursula Karruseit	Charlotte Gauß	In aller Freundschaft	1998–2019	21 years	
Claus Vinçon	Kathe Eschweiler	Lindenstraße	1995–2006, 2007–2017, 2018, 2019	21 years	
Annemarie Wendl	Else Kling	Lindenstraße	1985–2006	21 years	
Patrick Müller	Tobias Lassner	Unter uns	2006–present	20 years	
Bernhard Bettermann	Martin Stein	In aller Freundschaft	2006–present	20 years	
Tatjana Clasing	Simone Steinkamp	Alles was zählt	2006–present	20 years	
Silvan-Pierre Leirich	Richard Steinkamp	Alles was zählt	2006–2026	20 years	
Brigitte Antonius	Johanna Jansen	Rote Rosen	2006–present	20 years	
Ben Ruedinger	Till Weigel	Unter uns	2000–2020	20 years	
Joris Gratwohl	Alex Behrend	Lindenstraße	2000–2020	20 years	
Gabriele Metzger	Charlie Schneider	Verbotene Liebe	1995–2015	20 years	
Bernd Lambrecht	Ulrich Zimmerman	Die Fallers - Eine Schwarzwaldfamilie	2007–present	19 years	
Udo Schenk	Rolf Kaminski	In aller Freundschaft	2007–present	19 years	
Juliette Greco	Lena Bergmann	Alles was zählt	2007–2018	11 years	
Igor Dolgatschew	Denis Öztürk	Alles was zählt	2007–present	19 years	
Hermann Roelcke	Gunter Flickenschild	Rote Rosen	2007–present	19 years	
Ursula Erber	Theresa Brunner	Dahoam is Dahoam	2007–present	19 years	
Heidrun Gardener	Annalena Brunner	Dahoam is Dahoam	2007–present	19 years	
Brigitte Walbrun	Rosemarie Kirchleitner	Dahoam is Dahoam	2007–present	19 years	
Bernhard Ulrich	Hubert Kirchleitner	Dahoam is Dahoam	2007–present	19 years	
Harry Blank	Mike Preissinger	Dahoam is Dahoam	2007–present	19 years	
Christine Franzel	Zenzi Zöttl	Dahoam is Dahoam	2007–present	19 years	
Heinrich Stadler	Heinrich Stadler	Dahoam is Dahoam	2007–present	19 years	
Christine Reimer	Monika Vogl	Dahoam is Dahoam	2007–present	19 years	
Rolf Becker	Otto Stein	In aller Freundschaft	2006–2025	19 years	
Claudelle Deckert	Eva Wagner	Unter uns	2001–2006, 2007, 2008–2022, 2023	19 years	
Cosima Viola	Jack Aichinger	Lindenstraße	2001–2020	19 years	
Dieter Bellmann	Gernot Simoni	In aller Freundschaft	1998–2017	19 years	
Viktoria Brams	Inge Busch	Marienhof	1992–2011	19 years	
Margret van Munster	Rosi Koch	Lindenstraße	1988–2007	19 years	
Olaf Creutzburg	Jürgen Winterhalter	Die Fallers - Eine Schwarzwaldfamilie	2008–present	18 years	
Maverick Quek	Tu Nguyen	Die Fallers - Eine Schwarzwaldfamilie	2008–present	18 years	
Lucie Muhr	Eva Schönfeldt	Die Fallers - Eine Schwarzwaldfamilie	2007–2025	18 years	
Kai Noll	Rufus Sturm	Unter uns	2003–2020, 2022–2023	18 years	
Anna-Sophia Claus	Lea Starck	Lindenstraße	1999–2001, 2002, 2003–2013, 2014—2020	18 years	
Hendrikje Fitz	Pia Heilmann	In aller Freundschaft	1998–2016	18 years	
Harry Rowohlt	Harry Rennep	Lindenstraße	1995–2013	18 years	
Frank-Thomas Mende	Clemens Richter	Gute Zeiten, schlechte Zeiten	1992–2010, 2011	18 years	
Lisa Riecken	Elisabeth Meinhart-Richter	Gute Zeiten, schlechte Zeiten	1992–2010, 2011	18 years	
Ute Mora	Berta Griese	Lindenstraße	1985–2003	18 years	
Maria Fuchs	Carla Saravakos	Rote Rosen	2008–2012, 2013–present	17 years	
Silke Popp	Ursula Kirchleitner	Dahoam is Dahoam	2008–2009, 2010–present	17 years	
Martin Wangler	Bernd Clemens	Die Fallers - Eine Schwarzwaldfamilie	2009–present	17 years	
Ana-Carolina Kleine	Celine Schneider	Die Fallers - Eine Schwarzwaldfamilie	2009–present	17 years	
Ralph Gassmann	Andreas Grubb	Die Fallers - Eine Schwarzwaldfamilie	2009–present	17 years	
Jörg Rohde	Ben Steinkamp	Alles was zählt	2009–present	17 years	
Horst Kummeth	Roland Bamberger	Dahoam is Dahoam	2007–2024	17 years	
Anna Nowak	Usch Winicki	Lindenstraße	1990–2007, 2008, 2009	17 years	
Hans Christiani	A.R. Daniel	Gute Zeiten, schlechte Zeiten	1992–2009	17 years	
Martin Rickelt	Franz Wittich	Lindenstraße	1987–2004	17 years	
Horst Hildebrand	Leo Vogt	Die Fallers - Eine Schwarzwaldfamilie	1994–2005, 2006, 2007, 2008, 2009, 2012, 2013, 2014, 2015–2017, 2018–2019, 2021, 2023, 2024–present	16 years	
Jelena Mitschke	Britta Berger	Rote Rosen	2009–2014, 2015–present	16 years	
Iris Mareike Steen	Lilly Seefeld	Gute Zeiten, schlechte Zeiten	2010–present	16 years	
Valea Katharina Scalabrino	Sina Hirschberger	Unter uns	2010–present	16 years	
Sebastian Miro	Markus Riedle	Die Fallers - Eine Schwarzwaldfamilie	2010–present	16 years	
Nikolaus König	Niki	Die Fallers - Eine Schwarzwaldfamilie	2010–present	16 years	
Erich Altenkopf	Michael Niederbühl	Sturm der Liebe	2009–2025	16 years	
Joachim Lätsch	André Konopka	Sturm der Liebe	2007–2023	16 years	
Werner Rom	Lorenz Schattenhofer	Dahoam is Dahoam	2007–2023	16 years	
Jutta Kammann	Ingrid Rischke	In aller Freundschaft	1998–2014, 2018, 2019, 2021	16 years	
Horst D. Scheel	Hans Wilhelm Hülsch	Lindenstraße	1988–2004, 2007, 2009, 2020	16 years	
Philipp Neubauer	Philipp Sperling	Lindenstraße	1993–2003, 2005, 2008, 2010, 2012–2018, 2019, 2020	16 years	
Jacqueline Svilarov	Nina Zöllig	Lindenstraße	2000–2007, 2008, 2010, 2011–2020	16 years	
Gunnar Solka	Lotti Lottman	Lindenstraße	2004–2020	16 years	
Dominique Kusche	Sophie Ziegler	Lindenstraße	1998–2010, 2011–2015, 2018	16 years	
Jan Grünig	Mürfel Ziegler	Lindenstraße	1999–2013, 2015–2017, 2018	16 years	
Stefan Bockelmann	Malte Winter	Unter uns	2001–2017	16 years	
Martina Servatius	Elisabeth von Lahnstein	Verbotene Liebe	1999–2015	16 years	
Gert Schaefer	Heinz August Pasulke	Schloss Einstein	1998–2014	16 years	
Maren Gilzer	Yvonne Habermann	In aller Freundschaft	1998–2014	16 years	
Konrad Krauss	Arno Brandner	Verbotene Liebe	1995–2009, 2010–2012	16 years	
Wolfgang Seidenberg	Frank Töppers	Marienhof	1995–2011	16 years	
Eva Mona Rodekirchen	Maren Seefeld	Gute Zeiten, schlechte Zeiten	2010–2022, 2023–present	15 years	
Maurls Baimhäckel	Gabriele Rankl	Dahoam is Dahoam	2011–present	15 years	
Helga Januschkowetz	Gundi Wittman	Dahoam is Dahoam	2011–present	15 years	
André Dietz	Ingo Zadek	Alles was zählt	2006–2020, 2024–2025, 2026	15 years	
Thomas Drechsel	Tuner Krüger	Gute Zeiten, schlechte Zeiten	2009–2024	15 years	
Sam Eisenstein	Marian Öztürk	Alles was zählt	2006–2021	15 years	
Beatrice Kaps-Zurmahr	Andrea Neumann	Lindenstraße	2004–2009, 2010–2020	15 years	
Katharina Witza	Toni Zeker	Lindenstraße	2005–2020	15 years	
Willi Herren	Olli Klatt	Lindenstraße	1992–2007, 2012, 2014, 2020	15 years	
Uta Schorn	Barbara Grigoleit	In aller Freundschaft	1999–2014, 2015, 2017	15 years	
Imke Brügger	Rebecca Mattern	Unter uns	1997–2012	15 years	
Holger Franke	Wolfgang Weigel	Unter uns	1994–2009	15 years	
Ruth Köppler	Paula Dörflinger	Die Fallers - Eine Schwarzwaldfamilie	1994–2009	15 years	
Franz Rampelmann	Olaf Kling	Lindenstraße	1993–2008	15 years	
Andreas Geiss	Benedikt Johannes Stadlbauer	Dahoam is Dahoam	2009, 2010, 2011, 2012–present	14 years	
Holger M Wilhelm	Gregor Brunner	Dahoam is Dahoam	2010–2021, 2023–present	14 years	
Timothy Boldt	Ringo Huber	Unter uns	2012–present	14 years	
Hakim-Michael Meziani	Ben Berger	Rote Rosen	2011–2025	14 years	
Luis Lamprecht	Josef Zimmerman	Die Fallers - Eine Schwarzwaldfamilie	1994, 1995–2002, 2003, 2004–2005, 2007–2008, 2009, 2010, 2012–2013, 2014–2016, 2018–2019, 2021–2022, 2024	13 years	
Senta Auth	Veronika Brunner	Dahoam is Dahoam	2007–2011, 2012–2022	14 years	
Tommy Schwimmer	Florian Brunner	Dahoam is Dahoam	2007–2021	14 years	
Michael Trischan	Hans-Peter Brenner	In aller Freundschaft	2007–2021	14 years	
Miriam Lahnstein	Tanja von Lahnstein	Verbotene Liebe	1995–1998, 2001, 2004–2015	14 years	
Sven Thiemann	Charly Kolbe	Marienhof	1996, 1997–2011	14 years	
Julia Augustine	Vanessa Friederike Steinkamp	Alles was zählt	2006–2009, 2010–2012, 2013, 2014–2021, 2025–present	13 years	
Nadine Kettler	Stefanie Rabenalt	Die Fallers - Eine Schwarzwaldfamilie	2007, 2011, 2013–present	13 years	
Benjamin Heinrich	Bambi Hirschberger	Unter uns	2013–present	13 years	
Kaja Schmidt-Tychsen	Jenny Steinkamp	Alles was zählt	2011–2023, 2024–2025	13 years	
Claus Dieter Clausnitzer	Hannes Lüder	Rote Rosen	2012–2025	13 years	
Anja Franke	Merle Vanlohen	Rote Rosen	2011–2024	13 years	
Gerry Jungbauer	Thomas Jansen	Rote Rosen	2006–2007, 2008–2018, 2019–2021	13 years	
Hermann Giefer	Martin Kirchleitner	Dahoam is Dahoam	2008–2021	13 years	
Daniela Bette	Angelina Dressler	Lindenstraße	2007–2020	13 years	
Christian Buse	Thorsten Fechner	Marienhof	1998–2011	13 years	
Erwin Aljukic	Frederik Neuhaus	Marienhof	1998–2011	13 years	
Michaela Geuer	Martina Irrgang	Marienhof	1995–2008	13 years	
Susanne Gannott	Beate Flöter	Lindenstraße	1986–1998, 2001–2002	13 years	
Wolfgang Grönebaum	Egon Kling	Lindenstraße	1985–1998	13 years	
Felix van Deventer	Jonas Seefeld	Gute Zeiten, schlechte Zeiten	2014–present	12 years	
Constanze Weinig	Caro Sunday	Die Fallers - Eine Schwarzwaldfamilie	2014–present	12 years	
Philipp Sonntag	Ade Stadler	Lindenstraße	2008–2020	12 years	
Marcus Off	Phil Seegers	Lindenstraße	1986–1987, 1994–1998, 2002–2009, 2010, 2011, 2014, 2015, 2016, 2017, 2019	12 years	
Stefan Franz	Rolf Jäger	Unter uns	2002–2013, 2014, 2015–2016, 2021	12 years	
Dominic Saleh-Zaki	Andi Fritzsche	Verbotene Liebe	2001–2007, 2009–2015	12 years	
Cheryl Shepard	Elena Eichhorn	In aller Freundschaft	2003–2015	12 years	
Birgitta Weizenegger	Ines Krämer	Lindenstraße	1999–2011	12 years	
Nicole Belstler-Boettcher	Sandra Behrens	Marienhof	1995–1997, 1999–2009, 2010	12 years	
Gerd Udo Feller	Friedrich Dettmer	Marienhof	1995–2007	12 years	
Liz Baffoe	Mary Sarikakis	Lindenstraße	1995–2007	12 years	
Nadine Spruß	Valerie Zenker	Lindenstraße	1990–2002	12 years	
Catharina Kottmeier	Evelyn Riedle	Die Fallers - Eine Schwarzwaldfamilie	2015–present	11 years	
Jascha Rust	Kris Haas	In aller Freundschaft	2015–present	11 years	
Eisi Gulp	Sascha Wagenbauer	Dahoam is Dahoam	2015–present	11 years	
Carina Dengler	Kathi Benninger	Dahoam is Dahoam	2013–2024	11 years	
Clemens Löhr	Alexander Cöster	Gute Zeiten, schlechte Zeiten	2009–2020	11 years	
Ole Dahl	Paul Dagdelen	Lindenstraße	2009–2020	11 years	
Toni Snétberger	Enzo Buchstab	Lindenstraße	2006–2016, 2017–2018	11 years	
Wolfram Grandezka	Ansgar von Lahnstein	Verbotene Liebe	2004–2015	11 years	
Giselle Vesco	Hilde Scholz	Lindenstraße	2000–2011, 2012, 2013, 2014, 2015	11 years	
Kostas Papanastasiou	Panaiotis Sarikakis	Lindenstraße	1985–1996, 1999, 2000, 2001, 2010, 2012	11 years	
Sarah Bogen	Lili Mattern	Unter uns	2001–2012	11 years	
Alfonso Losa	Carlos Garcia	Marienhof	2000–2011	11 years	
Simon-Paul Wagner	Marlon Berger	Marienhof	2000–2011	11 years	
Antonio Putignano	Stefano Maldini	Marienhof	2000–2011	11 years	
Heike Ulrich	Tanja Maldini	Marienhof	2000–2011	11 years	
Hanna Köhler	Fray Dornmann	Die Fallers - Eine Schwarzwaldfamilie	2000–2011	11 years	
Susanne Steidle	Regina Zirkowski	Marienhof	1996–2007	11 years	
Michael Jäger	Matthias Kruse	Marienhof	1995–2006, 2007	11 years	
Christiane Maybach	Margot Weigel	Unter uns	1994–2005	11 years	
Moritz Hein	Max Zenker	Lindenstraße	1987–1998	11 years	
Jens Hajek	Benedikt Huber	Unter uns	2016–present	10 years	
Shayan Hartmann	Felix Brunner	Dahoam is Dahoam	2011–2021	10 years	
Joachim Kretzer	Torben Lichtenhagen	Rote Rosen	2010–2020	10 years	
Florian Stadler	Nils Heinemann	Sturm der Liebe	2008–2018, 2019	10 years	
Doreen Dietel	Beatrix Preissinger	Dahoam is Dahoam	2007–2017	10 years	
Markus Pfeiffer	Matthias Faller	Die Fallers - Eine Schwarzwaldfamilie	2007–2017	10 years	
Mona Seefried	Charlotte Saalfeld	Sturm der Liebe	2005–2006, 2007, 2008, 2009–2018	10 years	
Jo Weil	Olli Sabel	Verbotene Liebe	2000–2002, 2007–2015	10 years	
Giovanni Arvaneh	Sülo Özgentürk	Marienhof	1994–1997, 1998, 2003–2010	10 years	
Janis Rattenni	Anna Weigel	Unter uns	1994–2004	10 years	
Sigo Lorfeo	Paolo Varese	Lindenstraße	1993–2003	10 years	
Leonore Capell	Andrea Süsskind	Marienhof	1995–2005	10 years	
Renate Köhler	Marlene Schmitt	Lindenstraße	1991–2001	10 years	

=== Greece ===
Extended content

Actor	Character	Soap Opera	Years	Duration	Reference
Christos Politis	Yagos Drakos	Lampsi	1991–2005	14 years	
Myrto Pispini	Marianna Theochari	Kalimera Zoe	1993–2006	13 years	
Dimitris Aronis	Vassilis Leventagas	Kalimera Zoe	1993–2006	13 years	
George Mataragas	Paris Velidis	Kalimera Zoe	1993–2006	13 years	
Martha Koumbarou	Della Farmaki	Kalimera Zoe	1993–2006	13 years	
Nikos Apergis	Sevos Drakos	Lampsi	1993–2005	12 years	
Winter Mina	Electra Theochari Paleologos	Kalimera Zoe	1993–2005	12 years	
Syros Misthos	Harris Vergitsis	Kalimera Zoe	1995–2006	11 years	
Vicky Captain	Vicky Sachtouris	Kalimera Zoe	1994–2005	11 years	
George Vassilios	Stathis Theocharis	Kalimera Zoe	1993–2004	11 years	
Loukia Papadaki	Sandra Rolandou Drakou	Lampsi	1991–1999, 2000–2003	11 years	

=== Hungary ===
Extended content

Actor	Character	Soap Opera	Years	Duration	Reference
Csaba Tihanyi-Tóth	László Novák	Barátok közt	1998–2021	23 years	
Izabella Varga	Nóra Balogh	Barátok közt	1998–2021	23 years	
András Várkonyi	Vilmos Kertész	Barátok közt	1998–2021	23 years	
Károly Rékasi	Zsolt Bartha	Barátok közt	1998–2015, 2016, 2017–2021	21 years	
Zoltán Szőke	Miklós Berényi	Barátok közt	1998–2019, 2020	21 years	
Edit Ábrahám	Claudia Berényi	Barátok közt	1998–2014, 2015, 2016, 2018, 2019–2021	18 years	
Tibor Gazdag	Péter Pongrácz	Jóban Rosszban	2005–2022	17 years	
Dávid Jánosi	Viktor Nemes	Jóban Rosszban	2005–2022	17 years	
Veronika Madár	Gyöngyi Galambos	Jóban Rosszban	2005–2022	17 years	
Edina Pásztor	Éva Hunyadiné	Jóban Rosszban	2005–2022	17 years	
Péter Bozsó	Jenö Szlávik	Jóban Rosszban	2005–2022	17 years	
Lajos Posta	Müller Ottó	Jóban Rosszban	2005–2022	17 years	
Dániel Suhajda	Roland Fehér	Jóban Rosszban	2006–2017, 2018–2022	19 years	
Róbert Marton	Zoltán Kardos	Jóban Rosszban	2007–2022	15 years	
Katalin Mérai	Júlia Berényi	Barátok közt	2006–2021	15 years	
Ramóna Lékai-Kiss	Zsófia Szentmihályi	Barátok közt	2002–2017, 2018	15 years	
Anett Bálizs	Fanni Oravecz	Jóban Rosszban	2008–2022	14 years	
Roland Tóth	András Bodolai	Jóban Rosszban	2008–2022	14 years	
Tamás Kővári	Csaba Novák	Barátok közt	1998–2012, 2018	14 years	
Péter R. Kárpáti	András Berényi	Barátok közt	1998–2012	14 years	
Barna Timon	Szabolcs Bodolai	Jóban Rosszban	2009–2022	13 years	
Gyebnár Csekka	Novak Gizella	Barátok közt	2008–2021	13 years	
Ottó Kinizsi	Imre Balassa	Barátok közt	1999–2012, 2013	13 years	
Kristóf Németh	Géza Kertész	Barátok közt	1999–2012	13 years	
Zsóka Fodor	Magdolna Kertész Vilmosné	Barátok közt	1998–2011	13 years	
Lajos Cs. Németh	Károly Hunyadi	Jóban Rosszban	2010–2022	12 years	
László Domokos	Attila Berényi	Barátok közt	2009–2021	12 years	
Csilia Csomor	Zsuzsa Berényi	Barátok közt	1998–2007, 2011–2013, 2015	11 years	
Zoltán Kiss	István Csurgó	Barátok közt	1998–2009	11 years	
Alexandra Nagy	Aliz Fekete	Barátok közt	2011–2021	10 years	
Zsuzsa Szilágyi	Bözsi Kertész	Barátok közt	2011–2021	10 years	

=== India ===
Extended content

Actor	Character	Soap Opera	Years	Duration	Reference
Medha Jambotakar	Kaveri Singhania	Yeh Rishta Kya Kehlata Hai	2009–2021	12 years	
Lata Sabharwal	Rajshri Maheshwari	Yeh Rishta Kya Kehlata Hai	2009–2019	10 years	
Pooja Joshi Arora	Varsh Maheshwari	Yeh Rishta Kya Kehlata Hai	2009–2019	10 years	

=== Ireland ===
Extended content

Actor	Character	Soap Opera	Years	Duration	Reference
Tony Tormey	Paul Brennan	Fair City	1989–present	37 years	
Martina Stanley	Dolores Molloy	Fair City	1992–present	34 years	
Jim Bartley	Bela Doyle	Fair City	1990–2023	33 years	
Dave Duffy	Leo Dowling	Fair City	1996–present	30 years	
Macdara Ó Fátharta	Tadhg Ó Díreáin	Ros na Rún	1996–present	30 years	
Fionnuala Ní Fhlatharta	Berni Ní Neachtain	Ros na Rún	1996–present	30 years	
Maire Eilis Ní Fhlaithearta	Caitríona Ní Loideáin	Ros na Rún	1996–present	30 years	
Josie Ó Cualáin	Micheál Seoighe	Ros na Rún	1996–present	30 years	
Máire Uí Dhroighneáin	Máire Uí Chonghaile	Ros na Rún	1996–present	30 years	
Tom Jordon	Charlie Kelly	Fair City	1989–2019	30 years	
Pól Ó Gríofa	Mack Ó Riain	Ros na Rún	1997–present	29 years	
Aisling O'Neill	Carol Meehan	Fair City	1999–present	27 years	
Maclean Burke	Damien Halpin	Fair City	1998–2025	27 years	
Sorcha Furlong	Orla Kirwan	Fair City	2000–present	26 years	
Paul McCloskey	Vince De Búrca	Ros na Rún	2000–present	26 years	
Mick Nolan	Ray O'Connell	Fair City	2001–present	25 years	
Niall Mac Eachmharcaigh	John Joe Daly	Ros na Rún	2002–present	24 years	
Sarah Flood	Suzanne Halpin	Fair City	1989–2013, 2024	24 years	
Una Crawford O'Brien	Renee Phelan	Fair City	1998–2009, 2012, 2014–present	23 years	
Pat Nolan	Barry O'Hanlon	Fair City	1989–2011, 2019–2020	23 years	
Seán Mistéil	David Ó Laoire	Ros na Rún	2004–present	22 years	
Tommy O'Neill	John Deegan	Fair City	2001–2023	22 years	
Seamus Power	Dermot Fahey	Fair City	1996–2017, 2022–2023	22 years	
Ciabhán Ó Murchú	Jason O'Connor	Ros na Rún	1996–2018	22 years	
Clelia Murphy	Niamh Cassidy	Fair City	1995–2017	22 years	
Maidhc P. Ó Conaola	Malachi Keane	Ros na Rún	1999–2009, 2015–present	21 years	
Maire Breathnach	Mo Gilmartin	Ros na Rún	2002–2021, 2024–present	21 years	
Bryan Murray	Bob Charles	Fair City	2005–2025	20 years	
Niamh Quirke	Rachel Brennan	Fair City	1996–2016	20 years	
Micheál Ó hAinín	Labhrás Mac Raghnall	Ros na Rún	2000–2020	20 years	
Joe Steve Ó Neachtain	Peadar Ó Conghaile	Ros na Rún	1996–2016	20 years	
Mary McNamara	Bernie Kelly	Fair City	1989–2009	20 years	
Joan Brosnan Walsh	Mags Kelly	Fair City	1989–2009	20 years	
Joe Hanley	Hughie Phelan	Fair City	1990–1997, 2008, 2014–present	19 years	
Wesley Doyle	Doug Ferguson	Fair City	2007–present	19 years	
Diarmuid Mac an Adhastair	Séamus O`Catháin	Ros na Rún	1996–2015	19 years	
Bairbre Hergett	Sarah Uí Fhlaithearta	Ros na Rún	1996–2015	19 years	
Tom Sailí Ó Flaithearta	Cóilín Ó Catháin	Ros na Rún	1996–2015	19 years	
Ciara O'Callaghan	Yvonne Gleeson	Fair City	1991–2004, 2008–2014	19 years	
Jean Costello	Rita Doyle	Fair City	1989–2008, 2010	19 years	
Sheila McWade	Kay Costello	Fair City	1989–2008	19 years	
Bríd Ní Chumhaill	Imelda Uí Shea	Ros na Rún	2008–present	18 years	
Mick Lally	Miley Byrne	Glenroe	1983–2001	18 years	
Geraldine Plunkett	Mary McDermott Moran	Glenroe	1983–2001	18 years	
Emmet Bergin	Dick Moran	Glenroe	1983–2001	18 years	
Robert Carrickford	Stephen Brennan	Glenroe	1983–2001	18 years	
Marie Kean	Mrs Kennedy	The Kennedys of Castleross	1955–1973	18 years	
George McMahon	Mondo O'Connell	Fair City	2002–2005, 2008–2009, 2013–present	17 years	
Enda Oates	Pete Ferguson	Fair City	2009–present	17 years	
Doireann Ní Fhoighil	Áine Ní Dhíreáin	Ros na Rún	2009–present	17 years	
David Mitchell	Jimmy Doyle	Fair City	1991–2008, 2024	17 years	
Joe Lynch	Dinny Byrne	Glenroe	1983–2000	17 years	
Mary McEvoy	Biddy McDermott Byrne	Glenroe	1983–2000	17 years	
Michael Sheehan	Dean Dowling	Fair City	2008–2013, 2015–present	16 years	
Geoff Minogue	Tommy Dillon	Fair City	2010–present	16 years	
Tom Hopkins	Christy Phelan	Fair City	1998–2014	16 years	
Maureen Toal	Teasy Byrne	Glenroe	1985–2001	16 years	
Alan Stanford	George Manning	Glenroe	1985–2001	16 years	
Isobel Mahon	Michelle	Glenroe	1985–2001	16 years	
Ryan Keogh	Jack Gleeson	Fair City	2011–present	15 years	
Ciara Cox	Maeve Ní Loideáin	Ros na Rún	2011–present	15 years	
Kacey Wallace	Ruth Brennan	Fair City	2010–2025	15 years	
Victor Burke	Wayne Molloy	Fair City	1992–1997, 2009–2019	15 years	
Claudia Carroll	Nicola Prendergast	Fair City	1990–2005, 2008	15 years	
Paul Raynor	Harry Molloy	Fair City	1990–2005	15 years	
Sorcha Fox	Vanessa Barrett	Ros na Rún	1997–2002, 2004–2005, 2016–2019, 2021–present	14 years	
Eamon Morissey	Cass Cassidy	Fair City	2009–2023	14 years	
Rachel Sarah Murray	Jo Fahey	Fair City	2000–2011, 2012–2015	14 years	
John Cowley	Tom Riordan	The Riordans	1965–1979	14 years	
Tom Hickey	Benjy Riordan	The Riordans	1965–1979	14 years	
Moira Deady	Mary Riordan	The Riordans	1965–1979	14 years	
Biddy White Lennon	Maggie Riordan	The Riordans	1965–1979	14 years	
David O'Sullivan	Decco Bishop	Fair City	2007–2020	13 years	
Ann Marie Horan	Frances Uí Dhíreáin	Ros na Rún	2007–2020	13 years	
Gerard Byrne	Malachy Costello	Fair City	1996–2009	13 years	
Joan O'Hara	Eunice Dunstan	Fair City	1994–2007	13 years	
Pat Leavy	Hannah Finnegan	Fair City	1990–2003	13 years	
Annamaria Nic Dhonnacha	Bobbi-Lee Breathnach	Ros na Rún	2014–present	12 years	
Brídín Nic Dhonncha	Gráinne Ní Bhraonáin	Ros na Rún	2007–2019	12 years	
Rebecca Smith	Annette Daly	Fair City	1997–2009	12 years	
Seamus Moran	Mike Gleeson	Fair City	1996–2008	12 years	
Liana O'Cleirigh	Laura Halpin	Fair City	2011–2022	11 years	
Úna Kavanagh	Heather Daly	Fair City	2003–2009, 2014–2019, 2021	11 years	
Linda Bhreathnach	Róise De Búrca	Ros na Rún	2000–2004, 2006–2013	11 years	
Grace Barry	Mary-Ann Byrne	Glenroe	1990–2001	11 years	
Rachel Pilkington	Jane Black	Fair City	2013–2023	10 years	
Brídín Ní Mhaoldomhnaigh	Katy Daly	Ros na Rún	2010–2020, 2023	10 years	
Colm Ó Fatharta	Evan Ó Conghaile	Ros na Rún	2011–2021	10 years	
Mairéad Ní Ghallchóir	Angela Uí Dhíreáin	Ros na Rún	1996–2006, 2020	10 years	
Róisín Ní Chúaláin	Lee Ní Neachtain	Ros na Rún	2005–2015	10 years	
Gemma Doorly	Sarah O'Leary	Fair City	2001–2011	10 years	
Sorcha Ní Chéide	Ríona De Búrca	Ros na Rún	2000–2010	10 years	
Carla Young	Kira Cassidy	Fair City	1995–2004, 2008–2009	10 years	
Frank O'Donovan	Batty Brennan	The Riordans	1964–1974	10 years	

=== Italy ===
Extended content

Actor	Character	Soap Opera	Years	Duration	Reference
Patrizio Rispo	Raffaele Giordano	Un posto al sole	1996–present	30 years	
Luisa Amatucci	Silvia Graziani	Un posto al sole	1996–present	30 years	
Alberto Rossi	Michele Saviani	Un posto al sole	1996–present	30 years	
Germano Bellavia	Guido Del Bue	Un posto al sole	1996–present	30 years	
Marzio Honorato	Renato Poggi	Un posto al sole	1996–present	30 years	
Marina Tagliaferri	Giulia Poggi	Un posto al sole	1996–2008, 2011–present	27 years	
Luca Turco	Niko Poggi	Un posto al sole	1999–present	27 years	
Marina Giulia Cavalli	Ornella Bruni	Un posto al sole	2001–present	25 years	
Riccardo Polizzy Carbonelli	Roberto Ferri	Un posto al sole	2001–present	25 years	
Peppe Zarbo	Franco Boschi	Un posto al sole	1998–2023	25 years	
Ilenia Lazzarin	Viola Bruni	Un posto al sole	2001–2020, 2021, 2022–present	23 years	
Nina Soldano	Marina Giordano	Un posto al sole	2003–present	23 years	
Claudia Ruffo	Angela Poggi	Un posto al sole	1996–2005, 2006–2007, 2010–2023	23 years	
Michelangelo Tommaso	Filippo Sartori	Un posto al sole	2002–2007, 2008–2009, 2010–present	22 years	
Amato Alessandro D'Auria	Vittorio Del Bue	Un posto al sole	2002–2022, 2024	20 years	
Carmen Scivittaro	Teresa Diacono	Un posto al sole	1998–2018	20 years	
Lucio Allocca	Otello Testa	Un posto al sole	2002–2020, 2021, 2022, 2023–2024, 2025	19 years	
Francesco Vitiello	Diego Giordano	Un posto al sole	1996–2002, 2006–2009, 2012, 2017–present	18 years	
Davide Devenuto	Andrea Pergolesi	Un posto al sole	2003–2020	17 years	
Giorgia Gianetiempo	Rossella Graziani	Un posto al sole	2010–present	16 years	
Maurizio Aiello	Alberto Palladini	Un posto al sole	1996–2002, 2011, 2012, 2014, 2016–2017, 2018–present	15 years	
Elisabetta Coraini	Laura Beccaria	CentoVetrine	2001–2016	15 years	
Sergio Troiano	Valerio Bettini	CentoVetrine	2001–2016	15 years	
Miriam Candurro	Serena Cirillo	Un posto al sole	2012–present	14 years	
Antonella Prisco	Mariella Altieri	Un posto al sole	2013–present	13 years	
Pietro Genuardi	Ivan Bettini	CentoVetrine	2001–2014	13 years	
Samanta Piccinetti	Arianna Landi	Un posto al sole	2009–2020	11 years	
Roberto Alpi	Ettore Ferri	CentoVetrine	2001–2004, 2008–2016	11 years	
Valentina Pace	Elena Giordano	Un posto al sole	2002–2004, 2005–2010, 2014–2015, 2016–2017, 2018–2019, 2023, 2025	10 years	
Delia Boccardo	Tilly Nardi	Incantesimo	1998–2008	10 years	
Patrizia La Fonte	Olga Sciarra	Incantesimo	1998–2008	10 years	

=== Netherlands ===
Extended content

Actor	Character	Soap Opera	Years	Duration	Reference
Jette van der Meij	Laura Selmhorst	Goede tijden, slechte tijden	1990–2025	35 years	
Caroline De Bruijn	Janine Elschot	Goede tijden, slechte tijden	1992–present	34 years	
Erik de Vogel	Ludo Sanders	Goede tijden, slechte tijden	1996–present	30 years	
Bart Peereboom	Marcel Boeve	Goede tijden, slechte tijden	2000–present	26 years	
Bartho Braat	Jef Alberts	Goede tijden, slechte tijden	1991–2016, 2017, 2018–2019, 2021	26 years	
Ferri Somogyi	Rik de Jong	Goede tijden, slechte tijden	1995–2002, 2003, 2004, 2007–2014, 2015, 2016–present	24 years	
Everon Jackson Hooi	Bing Mauricius	Goede tijden, slechte tijden	2005–present	21 years	
Marly van der Velden	Nina Sanders	Goede tijden, slechte tijden	2005–present	21 years	
Babette van Veen	Linda Dekker	Goede tijden, slechte tijden	1990–1998, 2005–2006, 2015–2021, 2022–present	19 years	
Wilbert Gieske	Robert Alberts	Goede tijden, slechte tijden	1990–2008, 2015–2016, 2019, 2020	19 years	
Dennis Honhoff	Barry Lansink	Goede tijden, slechte tijden	2009–present	17 years	
Pamela Teves	Bettina Wertheimer	Onderweg naar Morgen	1994–2010	16 years	
Frits Jansma	JP	Onderweg naar Morgen	1994–2010	16 years	
Steef Hupkes	Jochem Damstra	SpangaS	2007–2022	15 years	
Wik Jongsma	Govert Harmsen	Goede tijden, slechte tijden	1991–2006	15 years	
Inge Schrama	Sjors Langeveld	Goede tijden, slechte tijden	2003–2017	14 years	
Sabine Koning	Anita de Jong	Goede tijden, slechte tijden	1992–2003, 2004, 2006–2009, 2014	14 years	
Felix Burleson	Aldert Kalkhoven	SpangaS	2007–2020	13 years	
Michael de Roos	Alex de Boer	Goede tijden, slechte tijden	2014–present	12 years	
Judy Doorman	Madge Jansen	SpangaS	2008–2020	12 years	
Annemieke Verdoorn	Joyce Couwenberg	Onderweg naar Morgen	1996–2008	12 years	
Ruud Feltkamp	Noud Alberts	Goede tijden, slechte tijden	2006–2018	12 years	
Ferry Doedens	Lucas Sanders	Goede tijden, slechte tijden	2009–2015, 2016–2021	11 years	
Joep Sertons	Anton Bouwhuis	Goede tijden, slechte tijden	2010–2021	11 years	
Charlotte Besijn	Barbara Fischer	Goede tijden, slechte tijden	1999–2010, 2011	11 years	
Elly de Graaf	Rosa Gonzalez	Goede tijden, slechte tijden	2000–2011	11 years	
Bettina Berger	Renée Couwenberg	Onderweg naar Morgen	1994–2005	11 years	
Melline Mollerus	Lisette Krol	Onderweg naar Morgen	1994–2005	11 years	
Ingeborg Wieten	Suzanne Balk	Goede tijden, slechte tijden	1990–2000	10 years	
Pauline van Rhenen	Aafke Couwenberg	Onderweg naar Morgen	1994–2004	10 years	

=== New Zealand ===
Extended content

Actor	Character	Soap Opera	Years	Duration	Reference
Michael Galvin	Chris Warner	Shortland Street	1992–1996, 2000–present	30 years	
Benjamin Mitchell	TK Samuels	Shortland Street	2006–2023	17 years	
Sally Martin	Nicole Miller	Shortland Street	2009–2024	15 years	
Angela Bloomfield	Rachel McKenna	Shortland Street	1993–1999, 2001–2003, 2007, 2009–2016, 2026–present	15 years	
Karl Burnett	Nick Harrison	Shortland Street	1992–2005, 2017	13 years	
Ben Barrington	Drew McCaskill	Shortland Street	2015–2026	11 years	
Ngahuia Piripi	Esther Samuels	Shortland Street	2015–present	11 years	
Ria Vandervis	Harper Whitley	Shortland Street	2013–2024	11 years	
Pua Magasiva	Vinnie Kruse	Shortland Street	2003–2006, 2011–2018	10 years	
Amanda Billing	Sarah Potts	Shortland Street	2004–2014, 2023	10 years	

=== Norway ===
Extended content

Actor	Character	Soap Opera	Years	Duration	Reference
Anette Hoff	Juni Anker-Hansen	Hotel Cæsar	1998–2005, 2006–2017	19 years	
Rudy Claes	Eva Rosenkrantz	Hotel Cæsar	2004–2017	13 years	
Kim Kolstad	Jens August Anker-Hansen	Hotel Cæsar	1998–2000, 2001–2005, 2007–2013	12 years	
Sossen Krogh	Astrid Anker-Hansen	Hotel Cæsar	1998–2010	12 years	
Elin Sogn	Julie Anker-Hansen	Hotel Cæsar	2000–2004, 2005–2012	11 years	
Tom Eddie Brudvik	Svein Krogstad	Hotel Cæsar	1999–2010	11 years	

=== Poland ===
Extended content

Actor	Character	Soap Opera	Years	Duration	Reference
Ludmiła Łączyńska	Wisia Matysiakowa	Matysiakowie	1957–2019	62 years	
Tomasz Stockinger	Paweł Lubicz	Klan	1997–present	29 years	
Andrzej Grabarczyk	Jerzy Chojnicki	Klan	1997–present	29 years	
Izabela Trojanowska	Monika Ross	Klan	1997–present	29 years	
Małgorzata Ostrowska-Królikowska	Grażyna Lubicz	Klan	1997–present	29 years	
Paulina Holtz	Agnieszka Lubicz	Klan	1997–present	29 years	
Kaja Paschalska	Aleksandra Lubicz	Klan	1997–present	29 years	
Joanna Żółkowska	Anna Surmacz	Klan	1997–present	29 years	
Tomasz Bednarek	Jacek Borecki	Klan	1997–present	29 years	
Jacek Borkowski	Piotr Rafalski	Klan	1997–present	29 years	
Piotr Swend	Maciej Lubicz	Klan	1997–present	29 years	
Jan Piechociński	Feliks Nowak	Klan	1998–present	28 years	
Barbara Bursztynowicz	Elżbieta Chojnicka	Klan	1997–2025	28 years	
Agnieszka Kaczorowska	Bożena Lubicz	Klan	1999–present	27 years	
Renata Pękul	Renata Zaburzańska	Klan	1999–present	27 years	
Renata Beger	Jadwiga Ziemiańska	Na dobre i na złe	1999–present	27 years	
Mirosław Jękot	Antoni Zaburzański	Klan	2000–present	26 years	
Dariusz Lewandowski	Dariusz Kurzawski	Klan	2000–present	26 years	
Teresa Lipowska	Barbara Mostowiak	M jak miłość	2000–present	26 years	
Malgorzata Pieńkowska	Maria Rogowska	M jak miłość	2000–present	26 years	
Rafał Mroczek	Paweł Zduński	M jak miłość	2000–present	26 years	
Marcin Mroczek	Piotr Zduński	M jak miłość	2000–present	26 years	
Katarzyna Cichopek	Kinga Zduńska	M jak miłość	2000–present	26 years	
Piotr Garlicki	Stefan Tretter	Na dobre i na złe	2000–present	26 years	
Monika Figura	Anna Oleszkówna	Na dobre i na złe	2000–present	26 years	
Anna Powierza	Czesława Kurzawska	Klan	2000–2013, 2014–present	25 years	
Ewa Kania	Dorota Matysiakowa	Matysiakowie	2001–present	25 years	
Hanna Mikuć	Krystyna Filarska-Marszałek	M jak miłość	2001–present	25 years	
Sławomir Holland	Staszek Popławski	M jak miłość	2001–present	25 years	
Dominika Ostałowska	Marta Budzyńska	M jak miłość	2000–2025	25 years	
Zofia Merle	Stefania Wróbel-Malec	Klan	1998–2023	25 years	
Laura Łącz	Gabriela Wilczyńska	Klan	2002–present	24 years	
Katarzyna Tlałka	Kinga Kuczyńska	Klan	2000–2024	24 years	
Joanna Pach	Joanna Kalinowska	Na dobre i na złe	2001–2009, 2011–present	23 years	
Grażyna Zielińska	Maria Zbieć	Na dobre i na złe	2001–2018, 2020–present	23 years	
Anna Mucha	Magdalena Marszałek	M jak miłość	2003–present	23 years	
Mieczysław Hryniewicz	Włodzimierz Zięba	Na Wspólnej	2003–present	23 years	
Sylwia Gliwa	Monika Cieślik	Na Wspólnej	2003–present	23 years	
Grażyna Wolszczak	Barbara Brzozowska-Smolna	Na Wspólnej	2003–present	23 years	
Michał Tomala	Daniel Brzozowski	Na Wspólnej	2003–present	23 years	
Robert Kudelski	Michał Brzozowski	Na Wspólnej	2003–present	23 years	
Waldemar Obłoza	Roman Hoffer	Na Wspólnej	2003–present	23 years	
Kazimierz Mazur	Kamil Hoffer	Na Wspólnej	2003–present	23 years	
Joanna Jabłczyńska	Marta Leśniewska	Na Wspólnej	2003–present	23 years	
Ewa Gawryluk	Ewa Ostrowska	Na Wspólnej	2003–present	23 years	
Jakub Wesołowski	Igor Nowak	Na Wspólnej	2003–present	23 years	
Renata Dancewicz	Weronika Roztocka	Na Wspólnej	2003–present	23 years	
Andrzej Precigs	Julian Deptuła	Klan	2000–2023	23 years	
Daniel Zawadzki	Michał Chojnicki	Klan	2004–present	22 years	
Suzanna von Nathusius	Małgorzata Borecka	Klan	2004–present	22 years	
Anna Guzik	Żaneta Zięba-Szulc	Na Wspólnej	2004–present	22 years	
Gabriela Jeżółkowska	Antonina Roztocka	Na Wspólnej	2004–present	22 years	
Aneta Zając	Maria Radosz	Pierwsza miłość	2004–present	22 years	
Maciej Tomaszewski	Marek Żukowski	Pierwsza miłość	2004–present	22 years	
Aleksandra Zienkiewicz	Kinga Kulczycka	Pierwsza miłość	2004–present	22 years	
Anna Ilczuk	Emilia Miedzianowska	Pierwsza miłość	2004–present	22 years	
Łukasz Płoszajski	Artur Kulczycki	Pierwsza miłość	2004–present	22 years	
Paweł Okoński	Marian Śmiałek	Pierwsza miłość	2004–present	22 years	
Tomasz Lulek	Antoni Turczyk	Pierwsza miłość	2004–present	22 years	
Bożena Dykiel	Maria Zięba	Na Wspólnej	2003–2025	22 years	
Aldona Orman	Barbara Milecka	Klan	1997–2004, 2012–present	21 years	
Anna Korcz	Izabela Brzozowska	Na Wspólnej	2003–2022, 2023, 2024–present	21 years	
Mariusz Krzemiński	Mariusz Kwarc	Klan	2005–present	21 years	
Lucyna Malec	Danuta Zimińska	Na Wspólnej	2005–present	21 years	
Grzegorz Gzyl	Marek Zimiński	Na Wspólnej	2005–present	21 years	
Rafał Kwietniewski	Bartek Miedzianowski	Pierwsza miłość	2005–present	21 years	
Andrzej Strzelecki	Tadeusz Koziełło	Klan	1999–2020	21 years	
Wojciech Kalarus	Wiktor Szabłowski	Klan	1997–2018	21 years	
Richard Dreger	Arkadiusz Maciejak	Klan	1997–2018	21 years	
Justyna Sieńczyło	Bogna Jakubowska	Klan	1998–2001, 2005, 2007–2011, 2013–present	20 years	
Ewa Kania	Zofia Borecka	Klan	1998–2002, 2005–2012, 2015, 2017–present	20 years	
Piotr Seweryński	Oskar Chojnicki	Klan	2002–2005, 2007, 2009–present	20 years	
Maria Pakulnis	Aneta Wróbel–Pałkowska	Pierwsza miłość	2004–2007, 2009–present	20 years	
Marta Jankowska	Renata Kraszewska	Na Wspólnej	2006–present	20 years	
Zuzanna Kaszuba	Marysia Szulc	Na Wspólnej	2006–present	20 years	
Katarzyna Walter	Agnieszka Cheblewska	Na Wspólnej	2006–present	20 years	
Artur Pontek	Janek Bocianowski	Matysiakowie	2006–present	20 years	
Andrzej Precigs	Zbigniew Filarski	M jak miłość	2000–2019, 2022–2023	20 years	
Zbigniew Borek	Maciej Gniadowski	Klan	1997–2017	20 years	
Artur Dziurman	Leszek Jakubowski	Klan	1999–2001, 2007–2016, 2018–present	19 years	
Amelia Malesa	Zofia Lubicz	Klan	2007–present	19 years	
Robert Koszucki	Rafał Konica	Na dobre i na złe	2007–present	19 years	
Maria Góralczyk	Beata Nowakowska	Na dobre i na złe	2007–present	19 years	
Sławomir Wierzbicki	Sławomir	Na dobre i na złe	2007–present	19 years	
Katarzyna Glinka	Katarzyna Górka-Sadowska	Barwy szczęścia	2007–present	19 years	
Marek Molak	Hubert Pyrka	Barwy szczęścia	2007–present	19 years	
Natalia Zambrzycka	Agata Pyrka	Barwy szczęścia	2007–present	19 years	
Olaf Kaprzyk	Staś Pyrka	Barwy szczęścia	2007–present	19 years	
Marzena Trybała	Elżbieta Żeleńska	Barwy szczęścia	2007–present	19 years	
Sławomira Łozińska	Barbara Grzelak	Barwy szczęścia	2007–present	19 years	
Joanna Gleń	Malwina Marczak	Barwy szczęścia	2007–present	19 years	
Bronisław Wrocławski	Jerzy Marczak	Barwy szczęścia	2007–present	19 years	
Adrianna Biedrzyńska	Małgorzata Marczak	Barwy szczęścia	2007–present	19 years	
Zbigniew Buczkowski	Zdzisław Cieślak	Barwy szczęścia	2007–present	19 years	
Mariusz Słupiński	Sławomir Dziedzic	Na Wspólnej	2007–present	19 years	
Emilian Kamiński	Wojciech Marszałek	M jak miłość	2004–2023	19 years	
Krystian Domagała	Mateusz Mostowiak	M jak miłość	2002–2021	19 years	
Kazimiera Utrata	Stanisława Dorobczuk-Bałucka	Klan	1999–2018	19 years	
Małgorzata Potocka	Jolanta Grzelak-Kozłowska	Barwy szczęścia	2008–present	18 years	
Anna Gornostaj	Róża Cieślak	Barwy szczęścia	2008–present	18 years	
Gabriela Ziembicka	Ewa Walawska	Barwy szczęścia	2008–present	18 years	
Kacper Łukasiewicz	Jakub Brzozowski	Na Wspólnej	2008–present	18 years	
Bartłomiej Kaszuba	Ignacy Brzozowski	Na Wspólnej	2008–present	18 years	
Aleksandra Konieczna	Honorata Leśniewska-Hoffer	Na Wspólnej	2008–present	18 years	
Jan Jankowski	Grzegorz Król	Pierwsza miłość	2008–present	18 years	
Paweł Krucz	Błażej Król	Pierwsza miłość	2008–present	18 years	
Dominika Kojro	Aleksandra Król	Pierwsza miłość	2008–present	18 years	
Grażyna Wolszczak	Grażyna Weksler	Pierwsza miłość	2008–present	18 years	
Marcin Hycnar	Michał Morawski	Matysiakowie	2008–present	18 years	
Kacper Kuszewski	Marek Mostowiak	M jak miłość	2000–2018, 2022	18 years	
Maria Winiarska	Alicja Marczyńska	Klan	1998–2015, 2019–2020	18 years	
Marian Opania	Tadeusz Zybert	Na dobre i na złe	1999–2017	18 years	
Jerzy Kamas	Stefan Ziętecki	Klan	1997–2015	18 years	
Teresa Stępień-Nowicka	Wanda Tyczyńska	Klan	2009–present	17 years	
Jakub Świderski	Norbert Piątkowski	Klan	2009–present	17 years	
Przemysław Redkowski	Jan Kozłowski	Barwy szczęścia	2009–present	17 years	
Krzysztof Wieszczek	Mikołaj Leśniewski	Na Wspólnej	2009–present	17 years	
Janusz Chabior	Artur Jaśkiewicz	Na Wspólnej	2009–present	17 years	
Karol Strasburger	Karol Weksler	Pierwsza miłość	2009–present	17 years	
Michał Koterski	Henryk "Kaśka" Saniewski	Pierwsza miłość	2009–present	17 years	
Marcin Troński	Bogdan Sawicki	Klan	1998–2007, 2009–2016, 2018–2019	17 years	
Bartosz Opania	Witold Latoszek	Na dobre i na złe	2001–2018	17 years	
Witold Pyrkosz	Lucjan Mostowiak	M jak miłość	2000–2017	17 years	
Agnieszka Kotulanka	Krystyna Lubicz	Klan	1997–2014	17 years	
Marta Wierzbicka	Aleksandra Zimińska	Na Wspólnej	2005–2017, 2019, 2022–present	16 years	
Karolina Dafne Porcari	Anita Szymczak	Barwy szczęścia	2007–2020, 2023–present	16 years	
Emilia Komarnicka-Klynstra	Agata Woźnicka	Na dobre i na złe	2008–2017, 2019–present	16 years	
Jacek Kałucki	Krzysztof Jaworski	Barwy szczęścia	2008–2014, 2016–present	16 years	
Krzysztof Janczar	Bolesław Kazuń	Klan	2010–present	16 years	
Edyta Herbuś	Marta Orłowska	Klan	2010–present	16 years	
Marcin Zacharzewski	Borys Jakubek	Na dobre i na złe	2010–present	16 years	
Marcin Sianko	Paweł Player	Na dobre i na złe	2010–present	16 years	
Barbara Kurzaj	Sabina Tomala	Barwy szczęścia	2010–present	16 years	
Jakub Dmochowski	Kajtek Cieślak	Barwy szczęścia	2010–present	16 years	
Anna Adamus	Zuzia Woźniak	Barwy szczęścia	2010–present	16 years	
Waldemar Błaszczyk	Damian Cieślik	Na Wspólnej	2010–present	16 years	
Izabela Dąbrowska	Teresa Bednarczuk	Na Wspólnej	2010–present	16 years	
Lech Dyblik	Roman Kłosek	Pierwsza miłość	2010–present	16 years	
Maurycy Torbicz	Mirek Jedliński	Pierwsza miłość	2010–present	16 years	
Halszka Lehman	Wiktoria Dąbek	Pierwsza miłość	2010–present	16 years	
Agnieszka Wielgosz	Malwina Dąbek–Florek	Pierwsza miłość	2010–present	16 years	
Iga Krefft	Urszula Lisiecka	M jak miłość	2007–2023	16 years	
Olga Jankowska	Klara Pyrka	Barwy szczęścia	2007–2023	16 years	
Małgorzata Socha	Zuzanna Hoffer	Na Wspólnej	2006–2022, 2024	16 years	
Marcjanna Lelek	Natalia Zarzycka	M jak miłość	2004–2020	16 years	
Marcin Chochlew	Filip Konarski	Na Wspólnej	2003–2013, 2014–2015, 2016, 2019, 2020–2021, 2023–present	15 years	
Ewa Skibińska	Teresa Kopytko–Żukowska	Pierwsza miłość	2004–2012, 2019–present	15 years	
Anna Kerth	Małgorzata Zimińska	Na Wspólnej	2005–2008, 2009, 2010–2012, 2015–2022, 2023–present	15 years	
Natalia Antoszczak	Martyna Czerka	Klan	2009–2015, 2017–present	15 years	
Katarzyna Żak	Halina Dębek	Na Wspólnej	2009–2011, 2013–present	15 years	
Małgorzata Sadowska	Henryka Kazuń	Klan	2011–present	15 years	
Konrad Darocha	Miłosz Kazuń	Klan	2011–present	15 years	
Ewa Drzymała	Ewa Godlewska	Klan	2011–present	15 years	
Michał Żebrowski	Andrzej Falkowicz	Na dobre i na złe	2011–present	15 years	
Jacek Kopczyński	Adam Werner	M jak miłość	2011–present	15 years	
Wojciech Błach	Wojciech Szulc	Na Wspólnej	2011–present	15 years	
Łukasz Konopka	Krzysztof Smolny	Na Wspólnej	2011–present	15 years	
Marek Kalita	Arkadiusz Ostrowski	Na Wspólnej	2011–present	15 years	
Michał Czernecki	Hubert Schultz	Pierwsza miłość	2011–present	15 years	
Marcin Krajewski	Adam Wysocki	Pierwsza miłość	2011–present	15 years	
Marek Kaliszuk	Robert Szymczak	Pierwsza miłość	2011–present	15 years	
Anna Szymańczyk	Dagmara Maciejewska	Pierwsza miłość	2011–present	15 years	
Małgorzata Sadowska	Aurelia Walicka	Pierwsza miłość	2011–present	15 years	
Łucja Kawczak	Julka Radosz	Pierwsza miłość	2011–present	15 years	
Adam Fidusiewicz	Maks Brzozowski	Na Wspólnej	2003–2009, 2012–2021, 2023	15 years	
Izabela Zwierzyńska	Iwona Pyrka	Barwy szczęścia	2007–2022	15 years	
Ilona Wrońska	Kinga Brzozowska	Na Wspólnej	2003–2018	15 years	
Sophia Merle	Stefania Wróbel-Malec	Klan	1998–2013, 2018	15 years	
Dariusz Jakubowski	Dariusz Wójcik	Na dobre i na złe	1999–2014	15 years	
Piotr Cyrwus	Ryszard Lubicz	Klan	1997–2012	15 years	
Wojciech Wysocki	Andrzej Marczyński	Klan	1998–2004, 2010–2011, 2013, 2019–present	14 years	
Anna Samusionek	Ilona Zdybicka	Na Wspólnej	2009, 2012–present	14 years	
Joanna Kupińska	Izabela Czaja–Kulczycka	Pierwsza miłość	2010–2017, 2019–present	14 years	
Marcin Kwaśny	Rafał Woźniacki	Klan	2012–present	14 years	
Michał Lesień	Janusz Sokołowski	Klan	2012–present	14 years	
Krzysztof Tyniec	Krzysztof Bąk	Klan	2012–present	14 years	
Mikołaj Roznerski	Marcin Chodakowski	M jak miłość	2012–present	14 years	
Maria Dejmek	Natalia Zwoleńska	Barwy szczęścia	2012–present	14 years	
Marcin Perchuć	Marek Złoty	Barwy szczęścia	2012–present	14 years	
Marek Krupski	Sebastian Kowalski	Barwy szczęścia	2012–present	14 years	
Wojciech Brzeziński	Bogdan Berg	Na Wspólnej	2012–present	14 years	
Wojciech Rotowski	Jarosław Berg	Na Wspólnej	2012–present	14 years	
Julia Chatys	Katarzyna Berg	Na Wspólnej	2012–present	14 years	
Natan Czyżewski	Franciszek Berg	Na Wspólnej	2012–present	14 years	
Patryk Pniewski	Krystian Domański	Pierwsza miłość	2012–present	14 years	
Urszula Dębska	Sabina Weksler	Pierwsza miłość	2008–2022	14 years	
Krzysztof Kiersznowski	Stefan Górka	Barwy szczęścia	2007–2021	14 years	
Jan Pęczek	Zenon Grzelak	Barwy szczęścia	2007–2021	14 years	
Julia Wróblewska	Zofia Warakomska	M jak miłość	2007–2021	14 years	
Anita Sokołowska	Lena Starska	Na dobre i na złe	2004–2018	14 years	
Agnieszka Wosińska	Dorota Lubicz	Klan	1997–2011	14 years	
Michał Kruk	Karol Wysocki	Klan	2003–2017	14 years	
Jacek Lenartowicz	Jan Zawdzki	M jak miłość	2002–2016	14 years	
Dorota Naruszewicz	Beata Borecka	Klan	1997–2011	14 years	
Magdalena Górska	Sandra Stec	Klan	1997, 1999–2000, 2014–present	13 years	
Lidia Sadowa	Justyna Kwiatkowska	Barwy szczęścia	2007–2016, 2022–present	13 years	
Zbigniew Suszyński	Igor Rutka	Klan	2011–2016, 2018–present	13 years	
Magdalena Wójcik	Beata Borecka	Klan	2013–present	13 years	
Dorota Kamińska	Jadwiga Dębińska-Lubicz	Klan	2013–present	13 years	
Julian Peciak	Paweł Ignacy Lubicz	Klan	2013–present	13 years	
Małgorzata Pieczyńska	Aleksandra Chodakowska	M jak miłość	2013–present	13 years	
Gabriela Raczyńska	Barbara Zduńską	M jak miłość	2013–present	13 years	
Małgorzata Różniatowska	Zofia Kisiel-Żak	M jak miłość	2013–present	13 years	
Hanna Bieluszko	Krystyna Jaworska	Barwy szczęścia	2013–present	13 years	
Anita Jancia-Prokopowicz	Beata Saganowska	Barwy szczęścia	2013–present	13 years	
Mikołaj Szostek	Kajetan Cieślik	Na Wspólnej	2013–present	13 years	
Anna Cieślak	Joanna Berg	Na Wspólnej	2013–present	13 years	
Wojciech Wysocki	Jerzy Dudek	Na Wspólnej	2007–2016, 2017–2021	13 years	
Maria Głowacka	Magdalena Zduńska	M jak miłość	2008–2021	13 years	
Ada Fijał	Iga Walawska	Barwy szczęścia	2008–2021	13 years	
Redbad Klynstra-Komarnicki	Ruud Van Der Graaf	Na dobre i na złe	2007–2020	13 years	
Piotr Jankowski	Piotr Walawski	Barwy szczęścia	2007–2020	13 years	
Marek Lewandowski	Roman Zarzycki	Klan	2006–2019	13 years	
Winchenty Grabarczyk	Jeremiasz Bałucki	Klan	2005–2018	13 years	
Joanna Koroniewska	Małgorzata Chodakowska	M jak miłość	2000–2013	13 years	
Artur Żmijewski	Jakub Burski	Na dobre i na złe	1999–2012	13 years	
Małgorzata Foremniak	Zofia Stankiewicz-Burska	Na dobre i na złe	1999–2012	13 years	
Anna Samusionek	Ilona Zdybicka	Na Wspólnej	2009, 2012, 2013–2014, 2015–present	12 years	
Anna Matysiak	Anna Ramona Szymańska	Klan	2014–present	12 years	
Grzegorz Wons	Leopold Kwapisz	Klan	2014–present	12 years	
Katarzyna Skolimowska	Leokadia Kwapisz	Klan	2014–present	12 years	
Katarzyna Chorzępa	Eliza Berg	Na Wspólnej	2014–present	12 years	
Maurycy Popiel	Aleksander Chodakowski	M jak miłość	2014–present	12 years	
Michał Rolnicki	Łukasz Sadowski	Barwy szczęścia	2014–present	12 years	
Stanisława Celińska	Amelia Wiśniewska	Barwy szczęścia	2014–present	12 years	
Maciej Kujawski	Stefan Dębek	Na Wspólnej	2009–2011, 2013–2023	12 years	
Błażej Michalski	Mikołaj "Mikser" Serczyński	Pierwsza miłość	2010–2022	12 years	
Jolanta Lothe	Teresa Struzik	Barwy szczęścia	2007–2017, 2019–2021	12 years	
Przemysław Stippa	Władek Cieślak	Barwy szczęścia	2009–2021	12 years	
Katarzyna Bujakiewicz	Marta Kozioł	Na dobre i na złe	2000–2011, 2016–2017	12 years	
Michalina Robakiewicz	Kamila Chojnicka	Klan	2003–2015	12 years	
Edyta Jungowska	Bożena Van Der Graaf	Na dobre i na złe	2000–2012	12 years	
Włodzimierz Matuszak	Antoni Wójtowicz	Plebania	2000–2012	12 years	
Katarzyna Łaniewska	Józefina Lasek	Plebania	2000–2012	12 years	
Bernadetta Machała-Krzemińska	Krystyna Cieplak	Plebania	2000–2012	12 years	
Janusz Michałowski	Jakub Blumental	Plebania	2000–2012	12 years	
Dariusz Kowalski	Janusz Tracz	Plebania	2000–2012	12 years	
Barbara Zielińska	Zofia Grzyb	Plebania	2000–2012	12 years	
Maciej Wilewski	Franciszek "Osa" Osówka	Plebania	2000–2012	12 years	
Stanisław Górka	Zbigniew Sroka	Plebania	2000–2012	12 years	
Maciej Damięcki	Jan Grzyb	Plebania	2000–2012	12 years	
Wojciech Błach	Jerzy Tosiek	Plebania	2000–2012	12 years	
Andrzej Zieliński	Adam Pawica	Na dobre i na złe	1999–2011	12 years	
Bartosz Obuchowicz	Tomasz Burski	Na dobre i na złe	1999–2011	12 years	
Jakub Wieczorek	Borys Grzelak	Barwy szczęścia	2015–present	11 years	
Andrzej Niemyt	Dariusz Janicki	Barwy szczęścia	2015–present	11 years	
Stanisław Szczypiński	Szymon Chodakowski	M jak miłość	2015–present	11 years	
Adriana Kalska	Izabela Chodakowska	M jak miłość	2015–present	11 years	
Marek Kossakowski	Daniel Ross	Klan	2015–present	11 years	
Matyna Kowalik	Kamila Chojnicka	Klan	2015–present	11 years	
Natalia Rewieńska	Paulina Jeżewska-Borecka	Klan	2015–present	11 years	
Monika Dryl	Urszula Kwapisz	Klan	2015–present	11 years	
Amelia Czaja	Matylda Smuda	Na dobre i na złe	2015–present	11 years	
Maryla Morydz	nurse Dagmara Pawlikowska	Na dobre i na złe	2015–present	11 years	
Tadeusz Huk	Ryszard Chlebowski	Na Wspólnej	2015–present	11 years	
Bartosz Głogowski	Sebastian Chlebowski	Na Wspólnej	2015–present	11 years	
Łukasz Wójcik	Tymon Życiński	Na Wspólnej	2015–present	11 years	
Ewa Gawryluk	Ewa Weksler	Pierwsza miłość	2015–present	11 years	
Elżbieta Romanowska	Karolina Kazan-Krojewicz	Pierwsza miłość	2015–present	11 years	
Marcin Sztabiński	Sylwester Kulas	Pierwsza miłość	2015–present	11 years	
Magdalena Walach	Agnieszka Olszewska	M jak miłość	2010–2021	11 years	
Katarzyna Dąbrowska	Victoria Consalida	Na dobre i na złe	2008–2019, 2021	11 years	
Grzegorz Stosz	Robert Petrycki	Klan	2009–2020	11 years	
Tomasz Schimscheiner	Andrzej Brzozowski	Na Wspólnej	2003–2014, 2015, 2016, 2017, 2019	11 years	
Kazimierz Wysota	Bogdan Zwoleński	Barwy szczęścia	2007–2018	11 years	
Dorota Kolak	Anna Marczak	Barwy szczęścia	2007–2018	11 years	
Jakub Małek	Wojtek Pyrka	Barwy szczęścia	2007–2018	11 years	
Honorata Witańska	Magda Zwoleńska	Barwy szczęścia	2007–2018	11 years	
Maja Barełkowska	Barbara	Klan	2000–2011	11 years	
Maria Niklińska	Agata Wilczyńska	Klan	1998–2002, 2003, 2010–2017	11 years	
Radosław Krzyżowski	Michał Sambor	Na dobre i na złe	2004–2015	11 years	
Maria Maj	Lucyna Banasik	M jak miłość	2001–2012	11 years	
Małgorzata Kożuchowska	Hanna Mostowiak	M jak miłość	2000–2011	11 years	
Anita Jancia	Jolanta Kowalska-Żurawska	M jak miłość	2000–2011	11 years	
Ewelia Serafin	Katarzyna Kociołek	M jak miłość	2000–2011	11 years	
Wojciech Dąbrowski	Piotr Wojciechowski	Plebania	2000–2011	11 years	
Sylwia Wysocka	Barbara Wojciechowska	Plebania	2000–2011	11 years	
Jerzy Rogalski	Antoni Tosiek	Plebania	2000–2011	11 years	
Joanna Pietrońska	Hanna Piecuch	Plebania	2000–2011	11 years	
Jolanta Fraszyńska	Monika Zybert-Jędras	Na dobre i na złe	1999–2010	11 years	
Wiktoria Gąsiewska	Oliwia Zbrowska	Barwy szczęścia	2016–present	10 years	
Marek Siudym	Anatol Koszyk	Barwy szczęścia	2016–present	10 years	
Lesław Żurek	Bruno Stański	Barwy szczęścia	2016–present	10 years	
Elżbieta Romanowska	Aldona Grzelak	Barwy szczęścia	2016–present	10 years	
Hubert Wiatrowski	Aleks Grzelak	Barwy szczęścia	2016–present	10 years	
Monika Dryl	Alicja Umińska	Barwy szczęścia	2016–present	10 years	
Sławomir Grzymkowski	Witold Koziełlo	Klan	2016–present	10 years	
Maciej Makowski	Andrzej Górzyński	Klan	2016–present	10 years	
Marcin Błaszak	Brajan Cebula	Klan	2016–present	10 years	
Bartosz Waga	Borys "Polak" Ostrowski	Klan	2016–present	10 years	
Marta Rostkowska	Anna Kurzawska	Klan	2016–present	10 years	
Marcin Bosak	Kamil Gryc	M jak miłość	2003–2006, 2019–present	10 years	
Aleksandra Hamkało	dr. Julia Burska-Bart	Na dobre i na złe	2016–present	10 years	
Piotr Głowacki	prof. Artur Bart	Na dobre i na złe	2016–present	10 years	
Dariusz Wnuk	Robert Tadeusiak	Na Wspólnej	2016–present	10 years	
Piotr Cyrwus	Zdzisław Muszko	Na Wspólnej	2016–present	10 years	
Krzysztof Wieszczek	Aleksander Tecław	Pierwsza miłość	2016–present	10 years	
Joanna Moro	Zosia Karnicka-Walawska	Barwy szczęścia	2007–2015, 2017–2019	10 years	
Marcin Rogacewicz	Przemysław Zapała	Na dobre i na złe	2008–2018	10 years	
Katarzyna Zielińska	Marta Walawska	Barwy szczęścia	2007–2017	10 years	
Andrzej Młynarczyk	Tomasz Chodakowski	M jak miłość	2007–2017	10 years	
Zbigniew Stryj	Adam Roztocki	Na Wspólnej	2005–2015	10 years	
Krzysztof Janczar	Małecki-Pawiński	Na dobre i na złe	2001–2011	10 years	
Stanisław Banasiuk	Andrzej Kuczyński	Klan	2001–2011	10 years	
Joanna Jędryka	Krystyna Cholakowa	M jak miłość	2000–2010	10 years	
Stanisław Jaskułka	Zenon Walencik	Plebania	2000–2010	10 years	
Radosław Popłonikowski	Józef Piecuch	Plebania	2000–2010	10 years	
Jakub Tolak	Daniel Ross	Klan	1998–2008	10 years	
Zygmunt Kęstowicz	Władysław Lubicz	Klan	1997–2007	10 years	

=== Scotland ===
Extended content

Actor	Character	Soap Opera	Years	Duration	Reference
Stephen Purdon	Bob Adams	River City	2002–2026	24 years	
Sally Howitt	Scarlett O'Hara	River City	2003–2026	23 years	
Eileen McCallum	Isabel Blair	Take the High Road	1980–2002, 2003	22 years	
Jeannie Fisher	Morag Kerr	Take the High Road	1981–2003	22 years	
Gwyneth Guthrie	Mary Mack	Take the High Road	1982–2003	21 years	
Frank Gallagher	Lenny Murdoch	River City	2005–2010, 2011–2026	20 years	
Lesley Fitz-Simons	Sheila Ramsay	Take the High Road	1983–2003	20 years	
Mary Riggans	Effie McDonald	Take the High Road	1983–2003	20 years	
Derek Lord	Davie Sneddon	Take the High Road	1984–1989, 1990–2003	18 years	
Anne Myatt	Mairi McIvor	Take the High Road	1987–2003	16 years	
John Stahl	Tom 'Inverdarroch' Kerr	Take the High Road	1982–1990, 1992–1993, 1996–2003	16 years	
Robin Cameron	Eddie Ramsay	Take the High Road	1982–1986, 1990–2002	16 years	
Deirdre Davis	Eileen Donachie	River City	2002–2016, 2022	14 years	
Jackie Farrell	Jockie McDonald	Take the High Road	1986, 1989–2003	14 years	
Richard Greenwood	Eric Ross Gifford	Take the High Road	1987–2001	14 years	
Terri Lally	Carol McKay	Take the High Road	1983–1997	14 years	
Jordan Young	Alex Murdoch	River City	2013–2026	13 years	
Johnny Beattie	Malcolm Hamilton	River City	2002–2015	13 years	
Tamara Kennedy	Joanna Ross Gifford	Take the High Road	1987–2000, 2002	13 years	
Marjorie Thomson	Grace Lachlan	Take the High Road	1980–1993, 1995	13 years	
Caroline Ashley	Fiona Cunningham	Take the High Road	1980–1993	13 years	
Scott Fletcher	Angus Lindsay	River City	2014–2026	12 years	
Paul Samson	Raymond Henderson	River City	2002–2014, 2022	12 years	
Eileen McCallum	Liz Hamilton	River City	2006–2018	12 years	
Alec Monteath	Dougal Lachlan	Take the High Road	1980–1992	12 years	
Joyce Falconer	Roisin McIntyre	River City	2002–2008, 2021–2026	11 years	
Carmen Pieraccini	Kelly-Marie Adams	River City	2003–2007, 2011–2016, 2019, 2024–2026	11 years	
Jacqueline Leonard	Lydia Murdoch	River City	2007–2012, 2017–2019, 2022–2026	11 years	
Gayle Telfer-Stevens	Caitlin McLean	River City	2015–2026	11 years	
Libby McArthur	Gina Hamilton	River City	2002–2013, 2022	11 years	
Billy McElhaney	Jimmy Mullen	River City	2005–2016	11 years	
Holly Jack	Nicole Brodie	River City	2010–2014, 2018–2024	10 years	
Gordon McCorkell	Deek Henderson	River City	2002–2012	10 years	
Robert Trotter	Obidiah Arthur Murdoch	Take the High Road	1982–1992, 1994	10 years	
Paul Kermack	Archie Menzies	Take the High Road	1980–1990	10 years	

=== South Africa ===
Extended content

Actor	Character	Soap Opera	Years	Duration	Reference
Rapulana Seiphemo	Tau Mogale	Generations	1994–2014	20 years	
Christine Basson	Nora Roelofse Naude	Egoli: Place of Gold	1992–2010	18 years	
Shaleen Surtie-Richards	Ester Willemse	Egoli: Place of Gold	1992–2010	18 years	
Brümilda van Rensburg	Louwna Roelofse Vorster Edwards Von Badenburg Edwards	Egoli: Place of Gold	1992–2010	18 years	
Hennie Smit	Bertie Roelofse	Egoli: Place of Gold	1992–2010	18 years	
Connie Ferguson	Karabo Moroka	Generations	1994–2010, 2014	16 years	
Michelle Botes	Cherel de Villiers	Isidingo	1998–2007, 2010–2013	12 years	
Lesego Motsepe	Letti Matabane	Isidingo	1998–2008	10 years	

=== Spain ===
Extended content

Actor	Character	Soap Opera	Years	Duration	Reference
Manuel Baqueiro	Marcelino Gómez	Amar en tiempos revueltos, Amar es para siempre (Note: Although Amar en tiempos revueltos and Amar es para siempre are two separate series, they are essentially the same show, with the latter continuing the series uninterrupted on another channel in 2012.)	2005–2024	19 years	
Itziar Miranda	Manolita Sanabria	Amar en tiempos revueltos, Amar es para siempre	2005–2024	19 years	
José Antonio Sayagués	Pelayo Gómez	Amar en tiempos revueltos, Amar es para siempre	2005–2024	19 years	

=== United States ===
Extended content

Actor	Character	Soap Opera	Years	Duration	Reference
Suzanne Rogers	Maggie Horton Kiriakis	Days of Our Lives	1973–1984, 1985–2003, 2004–present	51 years	
Helen Wagner	Nancy Hughes	As the World Turns	1956–1981, 1983, 1985–2010	50 years	
Don Hastings	Bob Hughes	As the World Turns	1960–2010	50 years	
Susan Seaforth Hayes	Julie Olson Williams	Days of Our Lives	1968–1984, 1990–1994, 1996, 1999–present	47 years	
Melody Thomas Scott	Nikki Newman	The Young and the Restless	1979–present	47 years	
Eileen Fulton	Lisa Grimaldi	As the World Turns	1960–1965, 1966, 1967–1983, 1984–2010	47 years	
Eric Braeden	Victor Newman	The Young and the Restless	1980–present	46 years	
Leslie Charleson	Monica Quartermaine	General Hospital	1977–2023	46 years	
Deidre Hall	Marlena Evans; Samantha Evans; Hattie Adams	Days of Our Lives	1976–1987, 1991–2009, 2011–present	44 years	
Kate Linder	Esther Valentine	The Young and the Restless	1982–present	44 years	
James Reynolds	Abe Carver	Days of Our Lives	1981–1990, 1991–2003, 2004–present	43 years	
Jacklyn Zeman	Bobbie Spencer	General Hospital	1977–2010, 2013–2023	43 years	
Doug Davidson	Paul Williams	The Young and the Restless	1978–2020	42 years	
Frances Reid	Alice Horton	Days of Our Lives	1965–2007	42 years	
Susan Lucci	Erica Kane	All My Children	1970–2011	41 years	
Erika Slezak	Victoria Lord	One Life to Live	1971–2012, 2013	41 years	
Bill Hayes	Doug Williams	Days of Our Lives	1970–1984, 1986–1987, 1993–1994, 1996, 1999–2003, 2004–2024	40 years	
Rachel Ames	Audrey Hardy	General Hospital	1964–1965, 1967–1970, 1971–2007, 2009, 2013, 2015	40 years	
Jeanne Cooper	Katherine Chancellor	The Young and the Restless	1973–2013	40 years	
Ray MacDonnell	Joe Martin	All My Children	1970–2010, 2011, 2013	40 years	
Lauralee Bell	Christine Blair Williams	The Young and the Restless	1983–2006, 2010–present	39 years	
Katherine Kelly Lang	Brooke Logan	The Bold and the Beautiful	1987–present	39 years	
John McCook	Eric Forrester	The Bold and the Beautiful	1987–present	39 years	
Jess Walton	Jill Fenmore Atkinson	The Young and the Restless	1987–present	39 years	
John Clarke	Mickey Horton	Days of Our Lives	1965–2004	39 years	
Josh Taylor	Chris Kositchek; Roman Brady	Days of Our Lives	1977–1981, 1982–1987, 1997–present	38 years	
Kathryn Hays	Kim Hughes	As the World Turns	1972–2010	38 years	
Peter Bergman	Jack Abbott	The Young and the Restless	1989–present	37 years	
Tracey E. Bregman	Lauren Fenmore Baldwin; Sarah Smythe	The Young and the Restless	1983–1995, 2000, 2001–present	37 years	
John Aniston	Eric Richards; Victor Kiriakis	Days of Our Lives	1969–1970, 1985–1997, 1998–2022	37 years	
John J. York	Mac Scorpio; James Meadows	General Hospital	1991–present	35 years	
Drake Hogestyn	John Black	Days of Our Lives	1986–2009, 2011–2013, 2014–2024	35 years	
Marie Masters	Susan Stewart	As the World Turns	1968–1979, 1986–2010	35 years	
Larry Bryggman	John Dixon	As the World Turns	1969–2004, 2010	35 years	
Michael Storm	Larry Wolek	One Life to Live	1969–2004	35 years	
Patricia Bruder	Ellen Lowell	As the World Turns	1960–1995, 1998	35 years	
Larry Haines	Stu Bergman	Search for Tomorrow	1951–1986	35 years	
Mary Stuart	Joanne Gardner	Search for Tomorrow	1951–1986	35 years	
Charita Bauer	Bert Bauer	Guiding Light	1950–1984	34 years	
John Beradino	Steve Hardy	General Hospital	1963–1996	33 years	
Kin Shriner	Scott Baldwin	General Hospital	1977–1980, 1981–1984, 1987–1993, 1997–2004, 2007–2008, 2013–2024	31 years	
Kristina Wagner	Felicia Scorpio	General Hospital	1984–2003, 2004–2005, 2007–2008, 2012–2014, 2015, 2016–2020, 2021–present	32 years	
Maurice Benard	Sonny Corinthos	General Hospital	1993–1997, 1998–present	32 years	
Joshua Morrow	Nicholas Newman	The Young and the Restless	1994–present	32 years	
Sharon Case	Sharon Collins	The Young and the Restless	1994–present	32 years	
Jerry Douglas	John Abbott; Alistair Wallingford	The Young and the Restless	1982–2013, 2015–2016	32 years	
Colleen Zenk	Barbara Ryan	As the World Turns	1978–2010	32 years	
Eileen Herlie	Myrtle Fargate	All My Children	1976–2008	32 years	
Ruth Warrick	Phoebe Tyler Wallingford	All My Children	1970–2002, 2005	32 years	
Christian LeBlanc	Michael Baldwin	The Young and the Restless	1991–1993, 1997–present	31 years	
Stuart Damon	Alan Quartermaine	General Hospital	1977–2008, 2011, 2012, 2013	31 years	
Robert S. Woods	Bo Buchanan	One Life to Live	1979–1986, 1988–2012, 2013	31 years	
Beth Maitland	Traci Abbott	The Young and the Restless	1982–1989, 1990–1993, 1994, 1995, 1996, 1999, 2001, 2006–present	30 years	
Eileen Davidson	Ashley Abbott	The Young and the Restless	1982–1988, 1999–2007, 2008–2012, 2013–2018, 2019–present	30 years	
Lynn Herring	Lucy Coe	General Hospital	1986–1992, 1992–2002, 2004, 2012–present	30 years	
Lauren Koslow	Kate Roberts; Kristen DiMera	Days of Our Lives	1996–present	30 years	
Nancy Lee Grahn	Alexis Davis	General Hospital	1996–present	30 years	
Kristian Alfonso	Hope Williams; Gina Von Amberg	Days of Our Lives	1983–1987, 1990, 1994–2020, 2022, 2023, 2024, 2025	30 years	
Peggy McCay	Caroline Brady	Days of Our Lives	1983, 1985–2003, 2004–2016	30 years	
Peter Hansen	Lee Baldwin	General Hospital	1965–1986, 1989–1990, 1992–1998, 2000–2002, 2004	30 years	
Henderson Forsythe	David Stewart	As the World Turns	1960–1990	30 years	
Rebecca Herbst	Elizabeth Webber	General Hospital	1997–present	29 years	
Anthony Geary	Luke Spencer; Bill Eckert; Tim Eckert	General Hospital	1978–1983, 1984, 1991–2015, 2017	29 years	
Julia Barr	Brooke English	All My Children	1976–1981, 1982–2006, 2010, 2011, 2013	29 years	
James Mitchell	Palmer Cortlandt	All My Children	1979–2008, 2010	29 years	
Macdonald Carey	Tom Horton	Days of Our Lives	1965–1994	29 years	
Wally Kurth	Ned Quartermaine	General Hospital	1991–2007, 2012, 2013, 2014–present	28 years	
Kristoff St. John	Neil Winters	The Young and the Restless	1991–2019	28 years	
Emily McLaughlin	Jessie Brewer	General Hospital	1963–1991	28 years	
Patty Weaver	Gina Roma	The Young and the Restless	1982–2009, 2013, 2023, 2025	27 years	
Melissa Reeves	Jennifer Horton	Days of Our Lives	1985–1995, 2000–2006, 2010–2020, 2021–2022, 2024, 2025	27 years	
Kimberly McCullough	Robin Scorpio Drake	General Hospital	1985–1999, 2000, 2004, 2005–2018, 2021	27 years	
David Canary	Adam Chandler; Stuart Chandler	All My Children	1983–2010, 2011, 2013	27 years	
Philip Carey	Asa Buchanan	One Life to Live	1980–2007, 2008	27 years	
Mary Fickett	Ruth Martin	All My Children	1970–1996, 1999–2000	27 years	
Victoria Wyndham	Rachel Cory Hutchins	Another World	1972–1999	27 years	
Virginia Payne	Ma Perkins	Ma Perkins	1933–1960	27 years	
J. Anthony Smythe	Henry Barbour	One Man's Family	1932–1959	27 years	
Judi Evans	Adrienne Johnson; Bonnie Lockhart	Days of Our Lives	1986–1991, 2003–2008, 2010–present	26 years	
Bryan Dattilo	Lucas Horton	Days of Our Lives	1993–2001, 2002–2010, 2012–2018, 2019, 2020-2024, 2025	26 years	
Elizabeth Hubbard	Lucinda Walsh	As the World Turns	1984–2010	26 years	
Tina Sloan	Lillian Raines	Guiding Light	1983–2009	26 years	
Jerry verDorn	Ross Marler	Guiding Light	1979–2005	26 years	
Don MacLaughlin	Chris Hughes	As the World Turns	1956–1981, 1985–1986	26 years	
Bernice Berwin	Hazel Barbour	One Man's Family	1932–1958	26 years	
Genie Francis	Laura Webber	General Hospital	1977–1982, 1983, 1984, 1993–2002, 2006, 2008, 2013, 2015–present	25 years	
Jane Elliot	Tracy Quartermaine	General Hospital	1978–1980, 1989–1993, 1996, 2003–2017, 2019–2021, 2022, 2023–present	25 years	
Mary Beth Evans	Kayla Brady Johnson	Days of Our Lives	1986–1992, 2006–2009, 2010–present	25 years	
Steve Burton	Jason Morgan; Drew Cain	General Hospital	1991–2000, 2001, 2002–2012, 2017–2021, 2024–present	25 years	
Susan Flannery	Stephanie Forrester	The Bold and the Beautiful	1987–2012, 2018, 2023	25 years	
Michael E. Knight	Tad Martin	All My Children	1982–1986, 1988–1990, 1992–2011, 2013	25 years	
Ronn Moss	Ridge Forrester	The Bold and the Beautiful	1987–2012	25 years	
Kathleen Widdoes	Emma Snyder	As the World Turns	1985–2010	25 years	
Anna Lee	Lila Quartermaine	General Hospital	1978–2003	25 years	
Constance Ford	Ada Hobson	Another World	1967–1992	25 years	
Charles Egelston	Shuffle Shober	Ma Perkins	1933–1958	25 years	
Michael Damian	Danny Romalotti	The Young and the Restless	1980–1998, 2002–2004, 2008, 2012, 2013, 2022–present	24 years	
Denise Alexander	Lesley Webber	General Hospital	1973–1984, 1996–2009, 2013, 2017, 2019, 2021	24 years	
Patricia Elliott	Renée Buchanan	One Life to Live	1987–2011	24 years	
Walt Willey	Jackson Montgomery	All My Children	1987–2011	24 years	
Robert Newman	Joshua Lewis	Guiding Light	1981–1984, 1986–1991, 1993–2009	24 years	
Carolyn Conwell	Mary Williams	The Young and the Restless	1980–2004	24 years	
Frances Heflin	Mona Tyler	All My Children	1970–1994	24 years	
Finola Hughes	Anna Devane; Alex Marick; Liesl Obrecht; Holly Sutton; Felicia Scorpio	General Hospital	1985–1992, 1995, 2006–2008, 2012–present	23 years	
Michelle Stafford	Phyllis Summers; Sheila Carter	The Young and the Restless	1994–1997, 2000–2013, 2019–present	23 years	
Christel Khalil	Lily Winters Ashby	The Young and the Restless	2002–2005, 2006–present	23 years	
Peter Reckell	Bo Brady	Days of Our Lives	1983–1987, 1990–1992, 1995–2012, 2015, 2016, 2022, 2023, 2025	23 years	
Robin Strasser	Dorian Lord	One Life to Live	1979–1987, 1993–2000, 2003–2011, 2013	23 years	
Scott Holmes	Tom Hughes	As the World Turns	1987–2010	23 years	
Frank Parker	Shawn Brady	Days of Our Lives	1983–1984, 1985–1989, 1990–2008	23 years	
Shell Kepler	Amy Vining	General Hospital	1979–2002	23 years	
Theo Goetz	Papa Bauer	Guiding Light	1949–1972	23 years	
Minetta Ellen	Fanny Barbour	One Man's Family	1932–1955	23 years	
Arthur Hughes	Bill Davidson	Just Plain Bill	1932–1955	23 years	
Camryn Grimes	Cassie Newman; Mariah Copeland	The Young and the Restless	1997–2006, 2007, 2009, 2010, 2013–present	22 years	
Bryton James	Devon Hamilton	The Young and the Restless	2004–present	22 years	
Alison Sweeney	Sami Brady; Adrienne Johnson; Colleen Brady	Days of Our Lives	1993–2014, 2015, 2017, 2018, 2019, 2020, 2021–2022, 2025	22 years	
Arianne Zucker	Nicole Walker; Helena Tasso; Kristen DiMera	Days of Our Lives	1998–2006, 2008–2017, 2018, 2019–2024	22 years	
Tricia Cast	Nina Webster	The Young and the Restless	1986–2001, 2008–2014, 2020–2021, 2023	22 years	
Brad Maule	Tony Jones	General Hospital	1984–2006, 2019	22 years	
Jill Larson	Opal Cortlandt	All My Children	1989–2011, 2013	22 years	
Maureen Garrett	Holly Norris	Guiding Light	1976–1980, 1988–2006, 2009	22 years	
Don Diamont	Brad Carlton	The Young and the Restless	1985–1996, 1998–2009	22 years	
Frank Dicopoulos	Frank Cooper	Guiding Light	1987–2009	22 years	
Ann Flood	Nancy Pollock	The Edge of Night	1962–1984	22 years	
William Johnstone	James T. Lowell	As the World Turns	1956–1978	22 years	
Ellen Demming	Meta Bauer	Guiding Light	1952–1974	22 years	
Laura Wright	Carly Corinthos; Beatrice Eckert; Lena Eckert	General Hospital	2005–present	21 years	
Amelia Heinle	Victoria Newman	The Young and the Restless	2005–present	21 years	
Tristan Rogers	Robert Scorpio	General Hospital	1980–1985, 1986–1992, 1995, 2006, 2008, 2012–2016, 2018–2024, 2025	21 years	
Kelly Monaco	Sam McCall; Alicia Montenegro	General Hospital	2003–2024	21 years	
Hunter Tylo	Taylor Hayes	The Bold and the Beautiful	1990–2002, 2004, 2005–2013, 2014, 2018–2019	21 years	
Peter Bartlett	Nigel Bartholomew-Smythe	One Life to Live	1991–2012, 2013	21 years	
Jon Hensley	Holden Snyder	As the World Turns	1985–1988, 1990–1995, 1997–2010	21 years	
Maeve Kinkead	Vanessa Chamberlain	Guiding Light	1980–1987, 1989–2000, 2002, 2005, 2006–2009	21 years	
Kim Zimmer	Reva Shayne	Guiding Light	1983–1990, 1995–2009	21 years	
Michael O'Leary	Rick Bauer	Guiding Light	1983–1986, 1987–1991, 1995–2009	21 years	
Audrey Peters	Vanessa Sterling	Love of Life	1959–1980	21 years	
Ron Tomme	Bruce Sterling	Love of Life	1959–1980	21 years	
Wally Kurth	Justin Kiriakis	Days of Our Lives	1987–1991, 2009–2014, 2015–present	20 years	
Kirsten Storms	Maxie Jones; B.J. Jones	General Hospital	2005–2011, 2012–2025, 2026	19 years	
Carolyn Hennesy	Diane Miller	General Hospital	2006–present	20 years	
Thaao Penghlis	Tony DiMera; André DiMera	Days of Our Lives	1981–1985, 1993–1996, 2002–2005, 2007–2009, 2015–2018, 2019–2023, 2025-present	20 years	
Winsor Harmon	Thorne Forrester	The Bold and the Beautiful	1996–2016, 2022, 2023	20 years	
Hillary B. Smith	Nora Buchanan	One Life to Live	1992–2012, 2013	20 years	
Renée Jones	Nikki Wade; Lexie Carver	Days of Our Lives	1982–1983, 1993–2012	20 years	
Tonya Lee Williams	Olivia Winters	The Young and the Restless	1990–2005, 2007–2012	20 years	
Ellen Dolan	Margo Hughes	As the World Turns	1989–1993, 1994–2010	20 years	
Jordan Clarke	Billy Lewis	Guiding Light	1982–1986, 1989–1993, 1996–1998, 1999–2009	20 years	
Benjamin Hendrickson	Hal Munson	As the World Turns	1985–2004, 2005–2006	20 years	
Richard Shoberg	Tom Cudahy	All My Children	1977–1996, 2004–2005	20 years	
Mandel Kramer	Bill Marceau	The Edge of Night	1959–1979	20 years	
Santos Ortega	Will Hughes	As the World Turns	1956–1976	20 years	
Melba Rae	Marge Bergman	Search for Tomorrow	1951–1971	20 years	
Bradford Anderson	Damian Spinelli	General Hospital	2006–2013, 2014–2026	19 years	
Heather Tom	Katie Logan	The Bold and the Beautiful	2007–present	19 years	
Beau Kazer	Brock Reynolds	The Young and the Restless	1974–1980, 1984–1986, 1990–1992, 1999–2004, 2008–2011, 2013–2014	19 years	
Kassie DePaiva	Blair Cramer	One Life to Live	1993–2012, 2013	19 years	
Pamela Payton-Wright	Addie Cramer	One Life to Live	1991–2005, 2007–2012	19 years	
Jennifer Bassey	Marian Chandler	All My Children	1983–1985, 1986–1989, 1995–2009, 2011	19 years	
Martha Byrne	Lily Walsh; Rose D'Angelo	As the World Turns	1985–1989, 1993–2008	19 years	
Susan Brown	Gail Baldwin	General Hospital	1977–1985, 1989–1990, 1992–2002, 2004	19 years	
Clint Ritchie	Clint Buchanan	One Life to Live	1979–1998, 1999, 2003, 2004	19 years	
Norma Connolly	Ruby Anderson	General Hospital	1979–1998	19 years	
James Pritchett	Matt Powers	The Doctors	1963–1982	19 years	
Stephen Nichols	Steve Johnson; Stefano DiMera	Days of Our Lives	1985–1990, 2006–2009, 2015–2018, 2019–present	18 years	
Jon Lindstrom	Ryan Chamberlain; Kevin Collins	General Hospital	1992–1997, 2002, 2004, 2013–2024, 2025-2026	17 years	
Galen Gering	Rafe Hernandez	Days of Our Lives	2008–present	18 years	
Eric Martsolf	Brady Black	Days of Our Lives	2008–present	18 years	
Lisa LoCicero	Olivia Falconeri	General Hospital	2008–present	18 years	
Joseph Mascolo	Stefano DiMera	Days of Our Lives	1982–1983, 1984–1985, 1988, 1993–1996, 1997–2001, 2007–2016, 2017	18 years	
Kelley Menighan	Emily Stewart	As the World Turns	1992–2010	18 years	
Daniel McVicar	Clarke Garrison	The Bold and the Beautiful	1987–1992, 1996–2009	18 years	
Marilyn Chris	Wanda Webb Wolek	One Life to Live	1972–1976, 1980–1994	18 years	
Irene Dailey	Liz Matthews	Another World	1974–1986, 1987–1993, 1994	18 years	
Lillian Hayman	Sadie Gray	One Life to Live	1968–1986	18 years	
Anne Elstner	Stella Dallas	Stella Dallas	1937–1955	18 years	
Jennifer Gareis	Donna Logan	The Bold and the Beautiful	2006–2015, 2016, 2017–2021, 2022–present	17 years	
Don Diamont	Bill Spencer Jr.	The Bold and the Beautiful	2009–present	17 years	
Nadia Bjorlin	Chloe Lane	Days of Our Lives	1999–2005, 2007–2011, 2013, 2015, 2016–2023	17 years	
Greg Rikaart	Kevin Fisher	The Young and the Restless	2003–2017, 2018, 2019–2022, 2023	17 years	
Ingo Rademacher	Jasper Jacks	General Hospital	1996–2000, 2001–2012, 2013, 2016, 2017, 2019–2021	17 years	
Schae Harrison	Darla Forrester	The Bold and the Beautiful	1989–2006, 2007, 2014, 2015	17 years	
John Ingle	Edward Quartermaine	General Hospital	1993–2004, 2006–2012	17 years	
Elizabeth Keifer	Blake Marler	Guiding Light	1992–2009	17 years	
Beth Ehlers	Harley Cooper	Guiding Light	1987–1993, 1997–2008	17 years	
Darlene Conley	Sally Spectra	The Bold and the Beautiful	1989–2006	17 years	
Anne Jeffreys	Amanda Barrington	General Hospital	1984–2001, 2004	17 years	
Michael Zaslow	Roger Thorpe	Guiding Light	1971–1980, 1989–1997	17 years	
William Roerick	Bruce Banning; Henry Chamberlain	Guiding Light	1972–1974, 1980–1995	17 years	
Joseph Gallison	Neil Curtis	Days of Our Lives	1974–1991	17 years	
Haila Stoddard	Pauline Harris Rysdale	The Secret Storm	1954–1971	17 years	
Jacqueline MacInnes Wood	Steffy Forrester	The Bold and the Beautiful	2008–2013, 2015–present	16 years	
Scott Clifton	Liam Spencer	The Bold and the Beautiful	2010–present	16 years	
Matthew Ashford	Jack Deveraux	Days of Our Lives	1987–1993, 2001–2003, 2004–2006, 2007, 2011–2012, 2016, 2017, 2018–2023, 2024, 2025	16 years	
Sonya Eddy	Epiphany Johnson	General Hospital	2006–2022	16 years	
Cheryl Hulteen	Winifred	All My Children	1991–2007, 2011, 2013	16 years	
Tamara Tunie	Jessica Griffin	As the World Turns	1987–1995, 1999–2007, 2009	16 years	
Justin Deas	Buzz Cooper	Guiding Light	1993–2009	16 years	
Laura Bryan Birn	Lynne Bassett	The Young and the Restless	1988–2004	16 years	
Stephen Schnetzer	Cass Winthrop	Another World	1982–1986, 1987–1999	16 years	
Linda Dano	Felicia Gallant	Another World	1983–1999	16 years	
Don Stewart	Mike Bauer	Guiding Light	1968–1984, 1997	16 years	
Candice Earley	Donna Beck	All My Children	1976–1992, 1995	16 years	
Louis Edmonds	Langley Wallingford	All My Children	1979–1995	16 years	
Julie Stevens	Helen Trent	The Romance of Helen Trent	1944–1960	16 years	
Florence Freeman	Ellen Brown	Young Widder Brown	1938–1954	16 years	
Dominic Zamprogna	Dante Falconeri	General Hospital	2009–2018, 2019, 2020–present	15 years	
Chad Duell	Michael Corinthos	General Hospital	2010–2025	15 years	
Judith Chapman	Jill Abbott; Gloria Abbott Bardwell	The Young and the Restless	1994, 2005–2018, 2020–2022, 2023	15 years	
Robert Krimmer	Andrew Carpenter	One Life to Live	1991–2004, 2006, 2008–2010	15 years	
Ron Hale	Mike Corbin	General Hospital	1995–2010	15 years	
Peter Simon	Ed Bauer	Guiding Light	1981–1984, 1986–1996, 2002–2004, 2009	15 years	
Grant Aleksander	Phillip Spaulding	Guiding Light	1982–1984, 1986–1991, 1996–2004, 2009	15 years	
Timothy D. Stickney	R. J. Gannon	One Life to Live	1994–2009	15 years	
Ron Raines	Alan Spaulding	Guiding Light	1994–2009	15 years	
James DePaiva	Max Holden	One Life to Live	1987–1990, 1991–2003, 2007	15 years	
John Castellanos	John Silva	The Young and the Restless	1989–2004	15 years	
Al Freeman Jr.	Ed Hall	One Life to Live	1972–1987, 1988, 2000	15 years	
Edward Mallory	Bill Horton	Days of Our Lives	1966–1980, 1991, 1992–1993	15 years	
Anthony Call	Herb Callison	One Life to Live	1978–1993	15 years	
Beverly Penberthy	Pat Matthews	Another World	1967–1982, 1989	15 years	
Douglass Watson	Mac Cory	Another World	1974–1989	15 years	
Kay Campbell	Kate Martin	All My Children	1970–1985	15 years	
Millette Alexander	Sara McIntyre	Guiding Light	1968–1983	15 years	
David O'Brien	Steve Aldrich	The Doctors	1967–1982	15 years	
Stefan Schnabel	Stephen Jackson	Guiding Light	1966–1981	15 years	
Michael M. Ryan	John Randolph	Another World	1964–1979	15 years	
Helene Dumas	Vivian Carlson	Love of Life	1959–1972, 1974–1976	15 years	
Jada Rowland	Amy Ames	The Secret Storm	1954–1958, 1960–1967, 1968–1971, 1973–1974	15 years	
Walter Greaza	Winston Grimsley	The Edge of Night	1956–1971	15 years	
Marjorie Gateson	Grace Tyrell	The Secret Storm	1954–1969	15 years	
Vivian Smolen	Sunday Brinthorpe	Our Gal Sunday	1944–1959	15 years	
Elizabeth Hendrickson	Chloe Mitchell	The Young and the Restless	2008–2014, 2015, 2016–2017, 2019–present	14 years	
Melissa Claire Egan	Chelsea Lawson	The Young and the Restless	2011–2018, 2019–present	14 years	
Christie Clark	Carrie Brady Reed	Days of Our Lives	1986–1991, 1992–1999, 2005–2006, 2010, 2011–2012, 2017, 2018, 2019, 2021, 2025	14 years	
Haley Pullos	Molly Lansing	General Hospital	2009–2023	14 years	
Tyler Christopher	Nikolas Cassadine	General Hospital	1996–1999, 2003–2011, 2013–2016	14 years	
Bergen Williams	Alice Gunderson	General Hospital	2001–2015	14 years	
Cady McClain	Dixie Cooney	All My Children	1988–1996, 1998–2002, 2005–2007, 2008, 2010, 2011, 2013	14 years	
Kristen Alderson	Starr Manning	One Life to Live	1998–2012	14 years	
Maura West	Carly Snyder	As the World Turns	1995–1996, 1997–2010	14 years	
Jay Hammer	Fletcher Reade	Guiding Light	1984–1998, 1999, 2009	14 years	
Beth Chamberlin	Beth Raines	Guiding Light	1989–1991, 1997–2009	14 years	
Patricia Mauceri	Carlotta Vega	One Life to Live	1995–2009	14 years	
William Christian	Derek Frye	All My Children	1991–2005	14 years	
Bernard Barrow	Johnny Ryan	Ryan's Hope	1975–1989	14 years	
Ron Hale	Roger Coleridge	Ryan's Hope	1975–1989	14 years	
Michael Levin	Jack Fenelli	Ryan's Hope	1975–1989	14 years	
Helen Gallagher	Maeve Ryan	Ryan's Hope	1975–1989	14 years	
Ellen Holly	Carla Gray	One Life to Live	1968–1980, 1983–1985	14 years	
Elizabeth Hubbard	Althea Davis	The Doctors	1964–1969, 1970–1978, 1981–1982	14 years	
Lydia Bruce	Maggie Powers	The Doctors	1968–1982	14 years	
Carl Lowe	Bob Rogers	Search for Tomorrow	1965–1979	14 years	
Ethel Remey	Alma Miller	As the World Turns	1963–1977	14 years	
Bernard Grant	Paul Fletcher	Guiding Light	1956–1970	14 years	
Mason Adams	Larry "Pepper" Young	Pepper Young's Family	1945–1959	14 years	
Claire Niesen	Mary Noble	Backstage Wife	1945–1959	14 years	
Vivian Smolen	Laurel Dallas	Stella Dallas	1941–1955	14 years	
Sean Kanan	Deacon Sharpe	The Bold and the Beautiful	2000–2005, 2012, 2014–2017, 2021–present	13 years	
Michael Graziadei	Daniel Romalotti	The Young and the Restless	2004–2013, 2016, 2022–present	13 years	
Maura West	Ava Jerome; Ada Hooke	General Hospital	2013–present	13 years	
Jason Thompson	Billy Abbott	The Young and the Restless	2016–present	10 years	
Melissa Ordway	Abby Newman	The Young and the Restless	2013–present	13 years	
Thorsten Kaye	Ridge Forrester	The Bold and the Beautiful	2013–present	13 years	
Lawrence Saint-Victor	Carter Walton	The Bold and the Beautiful	2013–present	13 years	
Alley Mills	Pamela Douglas	The Bold and the Beautiful	2006–2019, 2021, 2022, 2024	13 years	
Michael Park	Jack Snyder	As the World Turns	1997–2010	13 years	
Victoria Rowell	Drucilla Winters	The Young and the Restless	1990–1998, 2000, 2002–2007	13 years	
Tanya Boyd	Celeste Perrault	Days of Our Lives	1994–2007	13 years	
Mark LaMura	Mark Dalton	All My Children	1976–1989, 1994, 1995, 2004, 2005	13 years	
Marcy Walker	Liza Colby	All My Children	1981–1984, 1995–2005	13 years	
John Callahan	Edmund Grey	All My Children	1992–2005	13 years	
Erin Torpey	Jessica Buchanan	One Life to Live	1990–2003	13 years	
Rosemary Prinz	Penny Hughes	As the World Turns	1956–1968, 1985, 1986–1987, 1993, 1998, 2000	13 years	
Scott DeFreitas	Andy Dixon	As the World Turns	1985–1995, 1997–2000	13 years	
Anna Stuart	Donna Hudson	Another World	1983–1986, 1989–1999	13 years	
Larry Gates	H.B. Lewis	Guiding Light	1983–1996	13 years	
Michael Evans	Douglas Austin	The Young and the Restless	1980–1985, 1987–1995	13 years	
David Lewis	Edward Quartermaine	General Hospital	1978–1989, 1991–1993	13 years	
Alyce Webb	Sara Valentine	All My Children	1979–1992	13 years	
Nancy Addison Altman	Jillian Coleridge	Ryan's Hope	1975–1988, 1989	13 years	
Jed Allan	Don Craig	Days of Our Lives	1971, 1972–1985	13 years	
Forrest Compton	Mike Karr	The Edge of Night	1971–1984	13 years	
Hugh Franklin	Charles Tyler	All My Children	1970–1983	13 years	
Lucille Wall	Lucille Weeks	General Hospital	1963–1976, 1982	13 years	
Hugh Marlowe	Jim Matthews	Another World	1969–1982	13 years	
Billie Lou Watt	Ellie Harper Bergman	Search for Tomorrow	1968–1981	13 years	
Jack Stamberger	Henry Carlson	Love of Life	1961–1972, 1974–1976	13 years	
Lori March	Valerie Hill Ames	The Secret Storm	1961–1974	13 years	
Terry O'Sullivan	Arthur Tate	Search for Tomorrow	1952–1955, 1956–1966	13 years	
Kimberlin Brown	Sheila Carter	The Bold and the Beautiful	1992–1998, 2002, 2003, 2017–2018, 2021–present	12 years	
Ava & Grace Scaroia	Avery Jerome-Corinthos	General Hospital	2014–2025	11 years	
Billy Flynn	Chad DiMera	Days of Our Lives	2014–2026	12 years	
Camila Banus	Gabi Hernandez	Days of Our Lives	2010–2014, 2015–2023	12 years	
Thad Luckinbill	J. T. Hellstrom	The Young and the Restless	1999–2010, 2017–2018, 2019, 2023	12 years	
Sharon Wyatt	Tiffany Donely	General Hospital	1981–1984, 1986–1995, 2008, 2021	12 years	
Daniel Goddard	Cane Ashby	The Young and the Restless	2007–2019	12 years	
Vincent Irizarry	David Hayward	All My Children	1997–2006, 2008–2011, 2013	12 years	
Richard Fancy	Benny Abrahms; Bernie Abrahms	General Hospital	1997–2003, 2006–2012	12 years	
David Fumero	Cristian Vega	One Life to Live	1998–2003, 2004–2005, 2005–2011	12 years	
Cameron Mathison	Ryan Lavery	All My Children	1998–2002, 2003–2011	12 years	
Julianna McCarthy	Liz Foster	The Young and the Restless	1973–1982, 1984–1986, 1993, 2003–2004, 2008, 2010	12 years	
Kelly Ripa	Hayley Santos	All My Children	1990–2002, 2010	12 years	
Terri Conn	Katie Peretti	As the World Turns	1998–2010	12 years	
Marj Dusay	Alexandra Spaulding	Guiding Light	1993–1997, 1998–1999, 2002–2009	12 years	
Kamar de los Reyes	Antonio Vega	One Life to Live	1995–1998, 2000–2009	12 years	
Richard Van Vleet	Chuck Tyler	All My Children	1975–1984, 1989–1992, 1995, 2005	12 years	
Bobbie Eakes	Macy Alexander	The Bold and the Beautiful	1989–2000, 2001, 2002–2003	12 years	
Heather Tom	Victoria Newman	The Young and the Restless	1991–2003	12 years	
Tom Eplin	Jake McKinnon	Another World	1985–1986, 1988–1995, 1995–1999	12 years	
Lauren-Marie Taylor	Stacey Donovan Forbes	Loving	1983–1995	12 years	
Elizabeth Lawrence	Myra Murdoch Sloane	All My Children	1979–1991	12 years	
Frank Maxwell	Dan Rooney	General Hospital	1978–1990	12 years	
Jacqueline Courtney	Alice Matthews	Another World	1964–1975, 1984–1985, 1989	12 years	
Kathleen Noone	Ellen Dalton	All My Children	1977–1989	12 years	
Lois Kibbee	Geraldine Weldon; Whitney Saxon	The Edge of Night	1970–1971, 1973–1984	12 years	
Mart Hulswit	Ed Bauer	Guiding Light	1969–1981	12 years	
Nat Polen	Jim Craig	One Life to Live	1969–1981	12 years	
Fran Myers	Peggy Scott	Guiding Light	1965–1977, 1978, 1979	12 years	
Jonathan Moore	Charles Lamont	Love of Life	1966–1978	12 years	
Teri Keane	Martha Marceau	The Edge of Night	1963–1975	12 years	
Ed Prentiss	Ned Holden; Paul Holden; Richard Grant Sr.	Guiding Light	1937–1947, 1952–1954	12 years	
Martha Madison	Belle Black	Days of Our Lives	2004–2008, 2015–2016, 2017–2018, 2019, 2020–2023, 2024–present	11 years	
Rick Hearst	Ric Lansing	General Hospital	2002–2009, 2014–2016, 2024–present	11 years	
Parry Shen	Brad Cooper	General Hospital	2013–2017, 2018–2023, 2024–present	11 years	
Donnell Turner	Curtis Ashford	General Hospital	2015–present	11 years	
Eden McCoy	Josslyn Jacks	General Hospital	2015–present	11 years	
Leann Hunley	Anna DiMera	Days of Our Lives	1982–1986, 2007–2010, 2017, 2018, 2019, 2020–2023, 2025-present	11 years	
Louise Sorel	Vivian Alamain	Days of Our Lives	1992–2000, 2009–2011, 2017–2018, 2020, 2023, 2024, 2025	11 years	
Greg Vaughan	Eric Brady	Days of Our Lives	2012–2016, 2017–2024, 2025	11 years	
Veronica Redd	Mamie Johnson	The Young and the Restless	1990–1995, 1999–2004, 2023–2024	11 years	
Michael Easton	John McBain; Stephen Clay; Silas Clay; Hamilton Finn	General Hospital	2012–2015, 2016–2024	11 years	
Darin Brooks	Wyatt Spencer	The Bold and the Beautiful	2013–2024	11 years	
Kathleen Gati	Liesl Obrecht	General Hospital	2012–2023	11 years	
Barbara Crampton	Leanna Love	The Young and the Restless	1987–1993, 1998–2002, 2006–2007, 2023	11 years	
Roger Howarth	Todd Manning; Franco Baldwin; Drew Cain; Austin Gatlin-Holt	General Hospital	2012–2023	11 years	
Jason Thompson	Patrick Drake	General Hospital	2005–2016	11 years	
Debbi Morgan	Angie Hubbard	All My Children	1982–1990, 2008–2011, 2013	11 years	
John Reilly	Sean Donely	General Hospital	1984–1995, 2008, 2013	11 years	
Melissa Archer	Natalie Buchanan	One Life to Live	2001–2012, 2013	11 years	
Eddie Alderson	Matthew Buchanan	One Life to Live	2001–2012	11 years	
William Wintersole	Mitchell Sherman	The Young and the Restless	1986–1996, 1998, 2003, 2008–2009, 2011	11 years	
Lee Meriwether	Ruth Martin	All My Children	1996–1998, 2002–2011	11 years	
Anthony Herrera	James Stenbeck	As the World Turns	1980–1983, 1986–1989, 1997–1999, 2001–2002, 2003–2005, 2008, 2009, 2010	11 years	
Trent Dawson	Henry Coleman	As the World Turns	1999–2010	11 years	
Nathan Purdee	Hank Gannon	One Life to Live	1992–2003, 2009	11 years	
Socorro Santiago	Isabella Santos	All My Children	1993–2004	11 years	
Stephen T. Kay	Reginald Jennings	General Hospital	1992–2003	11 years	
James Kiberd	Trevor Dillon	All My Children	1989–2000	11 years	
Barbara Berjer	Bridget Connell	Another World	1985–1996, 1997, 1998	11 years	
Barbara Berjer	Barbara Norris Thorpe	Guiding Light	1971–1981, 1989, 1995–1996	11 years	
Dan Frazer	Dan McClosky	As the World Turns	1985–1996	11 years	
Lisa Wilkinson	Nancy Grant	All My Children	1973–1984, 1995	11 years	
Nada Rowand	Kate Rescott Slavinsky	Loving	1984–1995	11 years	
Gail Brown	Clarice Hobson	Another World	1975–1986, 1989, 1993	11 years	
Ken Meeker	Rafe Garretson	One Life to Live	1980–1991	11 years	
John Gabriel	Seneca Beaulac	Ryan's Hope	1975–1985, 1988–1989	11 years	
Brenda Dickson	Jill Foster Abbott	The Young and the Restless	1973–1980, 1983–1987	11 years	
Millee Taggart	Janet Bergman Collins	Search for Tomorrow	1971–1982	11 years	
Ivan Bonar	Chase Murdock	General Hospital	1966–1971, 1973–1979	11 years	
Virginia Dwyer	Mary Matthews	Another World	1964–1975	11 years	
George O. Petrie	Peter Quinn	The Edge of Night	1963–1974	11 years	
Nat Polen	Douglas Cassen	As the World Turns	1956–1967	11 years	
James Lipton	Richard Grant Jr.	Guiding Light	1951–1962	11 years	
Lyle Sudrow	Bill Bauer	Guiding Light	1948–1959	11 years	
Virginia Clark	Helen Trent	The Romance of Helen Trent	1933–1944	11 years	
Myrtle Vail	Myrtle Spear	Myrt and Marge	1931–1942	11 years	
Constance Towers	Helena Cassadine	General Hospital	1997–2002, 2003–2007, 2009, 2010, 2011, 2012, 2013, 2014–2015, 2016, 2017, 2019, 2020, 2022, 2023	10 years	
Tuc Watkins	David Vickers	One Life to Live	1994–1996, 2001, 2002, 2003–2006, 2007–2012, 2013	10 years	
Adrienne Frantz	Amber Moore	The Bold and the Beautiful	1997–2005, 2010–2012	10 years	
Catherine Hickland	Lindsay Rappaport	One Life to Live	1998–2008, 2009, 2012	10 years	
Darnell Williams	Jesse Hubbard	All My Children	1981–1988, 1994, 2001, 2002, 2008–2011, 2013	10 years	
John Loprieno	Cord Roberts	One Life to Live	1986–1992, 1993–1997, 2004, 2007, 2008, 2011	10 years	
Barbara Tarbuck	Jane Jacks	General Hospital	1996–2000, 2002–2007, 2009–2010	10 years	
Kurt McKinney	Matt Reardon	Guiding Light	1994–2000, 2005–2009	10 years	
Orlagh Cassidy	Doris Wolfe	Guiding Light	1999–2009	10 years	
Crystal Chappell	Olivia Spencer	Guiding Light	1999–2009	10 years	
Vasili Bogazianos	Benny Sago	All My Children	1980–1990, 2005	10 years	
Robyn Richards	Maxie Jones	General Hospital	1993–2001, 2002–2004	10 years	
Patrick Tovatt	Cal Stricklyn	As the World Turns	1988–1998, 2001	10 years	
Scott Reeves	Ryan McNeil	The Young and the Restless	1991–2001	10 years	
Matt Crane	Matt Cory	Another World	1988–1997, 1998–1999	10 years	
Tom Wiggin	Kirk Anderson	As the World Turns	1988–1998	10 years	
David Forsyth	John Hudson	Another World	1987–1997	10 years	
William Mooney	Paul Martin	All My Children	1972–1982, 1984, 1985, 1995	10 years	
Susan Keith	Shana Sloane Burnell	Loving	1984–1994	10 years	
Ronald Drake	Jasper Sloane	All My Children	1982–1992	10 years	
Gerald Anthony	Marco Dane	One Life to Live	1977–1986, 1989–1990	10 years	
Earl Hindman	Bob Reid	Ryan's Hope	1975–1984, 1988–1989	10 years	
Robert Clary	Robert LeClair	Days of Our Lives	1972–1973, 1975–1983, 1986–1987	10 years	
Maree Cheatham	Stephanie Wilkins	Search for Tomorrow	1974–1984	10 years	
John Danelle	Frank Grant	All My Children	1972–1982	10 years	
John Lupton	Tommy Horton	Days of Our Lives	1967–1972, 1975–1980	10 years	
John Colenback	Dan Stewart	As the World Turns	1966–1973, 1976–1979	10 years	
Craig Huebing	Phil Brewer; Peter Taylor	General Hospital	1967, 1969–1979	10 years	
Donald May	Adam Drake	The Edge of Night	1967–1977	10 years	
Jadrien Steele	John Reid Ryan	Ryan's Hope	1975–1985	10 years	
Robin Blake	Judy Clampett	General Hospital	1964–1974	10 years	
Fran Sharon	Cookie Pollock	The Edge of Night	1962–1964, 1964–1972	10 years	
Joanna Roos	Sarah Dale	Love of Life	1968–1978	10 years	
Ann Williams	Eunice Gardner Wyatt	Search for Tomorrow	1966–1976	10 years	
Diane Rousseau	Diana Martin	Love of Life	1966–1976	10 years	
Lynn Loring	Patti Barron	Search for Tomorrow	1951–1961	10 years	
Vivian Fridell	Mary Noble	Backstage Wife	1935–1945	10 years	

=== Wales ===
Extended content

Actor	Character	Soap Opera	Years	Duration	Reference
Lisabeth Miles	Megan Harries	Pobol y Cwm	1974–1995, 1996, 2002, 2003, 2011–present	36 years	
Andrew Teilo	Hywel Llywelyn	Pobol y Cwm	1990–present	36 years	
Gareth Lewis	Meic Pierce	Pobol y Cwm	1975, 1976–1994, 1999–2015, 2024, 2026	34 years	
Arwyn Davies	Mark Jones	Pobol y Cwm	1993–present	33 years	
Emyr Wyn	Dai Ashurst	Pobol y Cwm	1978–1984, 2001–2020, 2022–present	29 years	
Angharad Llwyd	Sophie Phillips	Rownd a Rownd	1997–present	29 years	
Elliw Haf	Glenda Prichard Phillips	Rownd a Rownd	1997–present	29 years	
John Glyn Owen	Terry John Phillips	Rownd a Rownd	1997–present	29 years	
Huw Ceredig	Reg Harries	Pobol y Cwm	1974–2003	29 years	
Phylip Hughes	Edwin Lloyd	Rownd a Rownd	1998–present	28 years	
Gwyn Elfyn	Denzil Rees	Pobol y Cwm	1984–2012	28 years	
Nia Caron	Anita Pierce	Pobol y Cwm	1999–2026	27 years	
Kevin Williams	Kelvin Walsh	Rownd a Rownd	1999–present	27 years	
Idris Morris Jones	Ken Walsh	Rownd a Rownd	1999–present	27 years	
Buddug Povey	Kay Walsh	Rownd a Rownd	1999–present	27 years	
Victoria Plucknett	Diane Ashurst	Pobol y Cwm	1998–2020, 2022–present	26 years	
Sera Cracroft	Eileen Walters	Pobol y Cwm	1989–1996, 1998, 2007, 2008–present	25 years	
Iestyn Garlick	Gym Williams	Rownd a Rownd	1995–2020	25 years	
Donna Edwards	Britt Monk	Pobol y Cwm	2002–present	24 years	
Jeremi Cockram	Sion White	Pobol y Cwm	2002–present	24 years	
Ffion Medi Jones	Dani Keegan	Rownd a Rownd	2002–present	24 years	
Iestyn Jones	Ieuan Griffiths	Pobol y Cwm	1988–1990, 1991–1992, 1995–1997, 2000–2011, 2019–present	23 years	
Siw Hughes	Kath Jones	Pobol y Cwm	1993–2007, 2014, 2017–present	23 years	
Islwyn Morris	David Tushingham	Pobol y Cwm	1974–1996, 2000–2002	24 years	
Bethan Ellis Owen	Ffion Llywelyn	Pobol y Cwm	2004–present	22 years	
Ernest Evans	Tal Jenkins	Pobol y Cwm	1975–1997	22 years	
Harriet Lewis	Maggie Tushingham	Pobol y Cwm	1974–1996	22 years	
Sue Roderick	Cassie Morris	Pobol y Cwm	1991–2004, 2018–present	21 years	
Emily Tucker	Sioned Rees	Pobol y Cwm	1993–1996, 2007, 2008–present	21 years	
Huw Llŷr	Vince Barclay	Rownd a Rownd	2005–present	21 years	
Richard Lynch	Garry Monk	Pobol y Cwm	2002–2023, 2024	21 years	
Gillian Elisa	Sabrina Harries	Pobol y Cwm	1974–1984, 1987, 1988, 1999–2010, 2024	21 years	
Robin Ceiriog	Mathew Parry	Rownd a Rownd	2006–present	20 years	
Elin Harries	Dani Monk	Pobol y Cwm	2007–present	19 years	
Sharon Roberts	Gaynor Llywelyn	Pobol y Cwm	2007–present	19 years	
Maldwyn John	Philip Parry	Rownd a Rownd	2007–present	19 years	
Gwyn Vaughan Jones	Arthur Thomas	Rownd a Rownd	2007–present	19 years	
Rhys ap Hywel	Jason Francis	Pobol y Cwm	1998–2007, 2015–2025	19 years	
Olwen Rees	Lena Lloyd	Rownd a Rownd	1995–2014, 2020	19 years	
Hywel Emrys	Derek Jones	Pobol y Cwm	1987–2006, 2009, 2012	19 years	
Dillwyn Owen	Jacob Ellis	Pobol y Cwm	1974–1993	19 years	
Jonathan Nefydd	Colin Evans	Pobol y Cwm	2008–present	18 years	
Llinor ap Gwynedd	Gwyneth Jones	Pobol y Cwm	2003–2020, 2022–2023	18 years	
Emyr Gibson	Meical Williams	Rownd a Rownd	2000–2018	18 years	
Dic Hughes	TL Thomas	Pobol y Cwm	1974–1992	18 years	
Rachel Thomas	Bella Davies	Pobol y Cwm	1974–1992	18 years	
Dyfan Rees	Iolo Davies-White	Pobol y Cwm	2009–present	17 years	
Lisa Victoria	Sheryl Hughes	Pobol y Cwm	2001–2018, 2024, 2026	17 years	
Iola Gregory	Nain	Rownd a Rownd	2000–2017	17 years	
Buddug Williams	Marian Rees	Pobol y Cwm	1999–2016	17 years	
Marion Fenner	Doreen Probert	Pobol y Cwm	1982–1996, 1999–2002, 2003	17 years	
Haydn Edwards	Dillwyn Harries	Pobol y Cwm	1974–1991	17 years	
Lowri Gwynne	Lowri Walsh	Rownd a Rownd	2010–present	16 years	
Karren Wynne	Iris Hardy	Rownd a Rownd	2005–2021	16 years	
Manon Ellis	Michelle Keegan	Rownd a Rownd	2002–2018	16 years	
Sian Beca	Cathryn Williams	Rownd a Rownd	2002–2018	16 years	
Eirlys Britton	Beth James	Pobol y Cwm	1977–1993, 1994	16 years	
Rhys ap William	Cai Rossiter	Pobol y Cwm	1996, 2002–2012, 2021–present	15 years	
Mark Flanagan	Jinx Jenkins	Pobol y Cwm	2005–2015, 2021–present	15 years	
Charles Williams	Harri Parri	Pobol y Cwm	1974–1989	15 years	
Shelley Rees	Stacey Jones	Pobol y Cwm	1993–2007, 2014, 2016, 2017, 2024	14 years	
Helen Rosser Davies	Sara Francis	Pobol y Cwm	1998, 2000–2008, 2015–2021, 2024	14 years	
Arwel Davies	Eifion Rowlands	Pobol y Cwm	2007, 2008–2022	14 years	
Gwion Tegid	Barry Hardy	Rownd a Rownd	2005–2010, 2013–2022	14 years	
Lauren Phillips	Kelly Evans	Pobol y Cwm	2003–2005, 2007, 2009, 2015–present	13 years	
Tudur Lloyd Evans	Iolo Davies	Rownd a Rownd	2013–present	13 years	
Tomi Llywelyn	Robbie Walsh	Rownd a Rownd	2010–2023	13 years	
Maria Pride	Debbie Collins	Pobol y Cwm	2005–2006, 2008–2020	13 years	
Olive Michael	Dora Jenkins	Pobol y Cwm	1984–1997	13 years	
Ieuan Rhys	Glyn James	Pobol y Cwm	1983–1996	13 years	
Iona Banks	Gladys Lake	Pobol y Cwm	1976–1989, 1990, 1991	13 years	
Dewi Morris	Wayne Harries	Pobol y Cwm	1974–1987	13 years	
Dewi Morris	Islwyn Morgan	Rownd a Rownd	1995–2007, 2020	12 years	
Jonathan Morgan	Gareth Wyn Harries	Pobol y Cwm	1975–1987	12 years	
Carwyn Glyn	Richard DJ Ashurst	Pobol y Cwm	2014–2025, 2026	11 years	
Tomos West	Ricky Jones	Pobol y Cwm	2008–2019, 2022	11 years	
Rhys Hartley	Huw White	Pobol y Cwm	2002–2013, 2014	11 years	
Alwyn Jones	Herbert Gwyther	Pobol y Cwm	1977–1988	11 years	
Huw Euron	Darren Howarth	Pobol y Cwm	1998–2007, 2013–2014, 2018, 2024, 2026	10 years	
Ffion Dafis	Alwena Parry	Rownd a Rownd	2007–2017, 2019	10 years	
Marged Esli	Nansi Furlong	Pobol y Cwm	1977, 1980–1989, 2010, 2011–2012, 2014, 2015, 2016	10 years	
Dewi Humphreys	Jason Hardy	Rownd a Rownd	2005–2015	10 years	
Yoland Williams	Tegid Morris	Pobol y Cwm	1991, 1992, 1993, 1994–2004	10 years	
Iola Gregory	Jean McGurk	Pobol y Cwm	1987–1997, 1999, 2002	10 years	
Rhys Parry Jones	Llew Matthews	Pobol y Cwm	1988–1989, 1992–2001	10 years	
Ifan Huw Dafydd	Dic Ashurst	Pobol y Cwm	1982–1992, 1993, 1995, 1999	10 years	
Phylip Hughes	Stan Bevan	Pobol y Cwm	1984–1994	10 years	
Gaynor Morgan Rees	Nerys Cadwaladr	Pobol y Cwm	1974–1976, 1979–1980, 1982–1986, 1988–1991	10 years	

== See also ==
- List of American television actresses
- List of British actors
- List of Dutch people
- List of Germans
- List of Irish people
- List of New Zealand actors
- List of old-time radio people
- List of radio soaps
- List of soap operas
- Lists of Americans
- Lists of Australians
