= List of Fair City characters =

List of characters in RTÉ soap opera "Fair City"

Fair City is an Irish television soap opera first broadcast on RTÉ One in 1989. The following is a list of characters who currently appear in the programme and a list of former characters, listed in order of first appearance. Some characters have been recast since their first appearance.

== Present characters ==
Character	Actor	Character duration
Paul Brennan	Tony Tormey	1989–present
Hughie Phelan	Joe Hanley	1990–1997, 2008, 2014–present
Dolores Molloy	Martina Stanley	1992–present
Kira Cassidy	Carla Young	1995–2004, 2008–2009
Kira Cassidy	Lynseyann Mulvey	2022–present
Leo Dowling	Dave Duffy	1996–present
Dean Dowling	Aidan Kelly	1996–1998
Dean Dowling	Michael Sheehan	2008–2013, 2015–present
Oisín Brennan	Patrick Ball	1997–2007, 2016–2020, 2026–present
Renee Phelan	Úna Crawford O'Brien	1998–2009, 2012, 2014–present
Carol Foley	Aisling O'Neill	1999–present
Orla Kirwan	Sorcha Furlong	2000–present
Ray O'Connell	Mick Nolan	2001–present
Sean Cassidy	Andrew Duane	2002, 2007
Sean Cassidy	Ryan Andrews	2008–present
Mondo O'Connell	George McMahon	2002–2005, 2008–2009, 2013–present
Lorcan Foley Jr.	Kyle Finnerty	2007–2010
Lorcan Foley Jr.	Tom Gould	2025–2026
Lorcan Foley Jr.	John Kearney	2026–present
Doug Ferguson	Wesley Doyle	2007–present
Pete Ferguson	Enda Oates	2007–present
Eleanor "Ellie" Daly	Susie Power	2008–2010, 2015–2016, 2021, 2025–present
Patrick "Cass" Cassidy	Eamon Morrissey	2009–present
Tommy Dillon	Geoff Minogue	2010–present
Sasha "Sash" Bishop	Stephanie Kelly	2011–2012, 2015–2021, 2023–present
Sasha "Sash" Bishop	Charleigh Bailey	2021
Zoe Allen	Lauren Kinsella	2011–2017, 2022–2023
Zoe Allen	Connie Doona	2023–present
Ben Fahey	James O'Donoghue	2012–2017
Ben Fahey	Cian Fitzsimons	2026–present
Junior Molloy	Uncredited	2014–2015
Junior Molloy	Charlie Duffy	2016–present
Hayley Collins	Rebecca Grimes	2015–present
Cathal Spillane	Eric Lalor	2015–2018, 2024, 2026–present
Nikki Duff	Kiara Noonan	2015–2017, 2024–present
Ciarán Holloway	Johnny Ward	2016–2017, 2019, 2024–present
Nora Keogh	Ruth Hegarty	2016–present
Melanie Ryan	Nyree Yergainharsian	2016–present
Alex Petrosian	Adam Karim	2017–present
Sharon Collins	Neili Conroy	2018–present
Ger Lynch	Tina Kellegher	2019–2021, 2025–present
James Rafferty	Matthew O'Brien	2021–present
Tyler Munroe	Peter Gaynor	2021, 2024–present
Con Rafferty	Liam Carney	2022–present
Maxine Stapleton	Elaine Purdue	2022–present
Gareth Boyle	Shane Quigley Murphy	2022–present
Georgie Dennis	Shaun Dunne	2023–present
Jacinta Boyle	Deirdre Donnelly	2023–present
Gwen Connolly	Emily Lamey	2023–present
Babs Mullen	Ali Fox	2023–present
Fergal Boyle	Craig Connolly	2023–present
Emma Rafferty	Tara Flynn	2024–present
JJ Nash	Brian Doherty	2024–present
Ian Stapleton	Ciarán McCourt	2024–present
Conan Patton	Brian Moore	2024, 2026–present
Holly Shine	Sorcha Fahy	2025–present
Milo Shine	Matijs Annes	2025–present
Anthony "Scout" Collins	Lachlan Shane Walsh	2025–present
Dr. Max Dillon	Adam Phelan	2026–present
Tara Seymour	Ebimie Anthony	2026–present
Lily Patterson	Beverly Callard	2026–present
Síofra O'Doherty	Nancy Collins	2026–present
Denise Foley	Margaret McAuliffe	2026–present
Frankie Conroy	Lloyd Cooney	2026–present
Danny Moloney	Tom Moran	2026–present

== Past characters ==
The following characters departed Carrigstown.

Character	Actor	Character duration	Status
Victor Mullen	Mark Asante	2023–2026	Left after JJ Nash ordered him to, wrongly believing he was a police informant
Nicola Prendergast	Claudia Carroll	1993–2007, 2016–2017, 2020, 2026	Left after abandoning Paul Brennan in prison
Steo Nash	Gerard Jordan	2023–2026	Fled to avoid a court appearance and prison sentence
Juliet O'Connell	Uncredited	2003–2004, 2008–2009	
Juliet O'Connell	Laoise Murphy	2014–2015	
Juliet O'Connell	Ella Barton	2017–2023, 2025–2026	Left again after her father Mondo was acquitted of killing Anto Collins
Mairéad Casey	Amy Kirwan	2018–2026	Joined her daughter Phoebe in New Zealand
Phoebe Casey	Claire Gavin	2018–2021	
Phoebe Casey	Kate Brosnan	2025–2026	Went to New Zealand with her hockey team before returning to Canada
Ruby Mullen	Rachel Wren	2023–2026	Joined her sister Jess in London
Jess Mullen	Ciana Howlin	2023–2024	
Jess Mullen	Aoife Bawle	2024–2026	Joined her boyfriend Greg Kiely in London
Greg Kiely	Shane McCarthy	2023–2026	Fled to London to avoid going to prison for spiking Lorcan Foley Jr.
Ali Foley	Doireann Ní Chorragáin	2005–2009, 2020, 2025–2026	Returned to London after visiting her son, Lorcan Foley Jr.
Isaac "Zak" Dillon	Kevin Joyce	2010–2012	
Isaac "Zak" Dillon	Peter Corboy	2019	
Isaac "Zak" Dillon	Stephen O'Leary	2021–2025	Returned to Spain after visiting his father, Tommy Dillon
Damien Halpin	Maclean Burke	1998–2025	Moved to Germany
Nora "Nono" Ferguson	Poppy Dixon Hollywood	2022–2025	Went to live with her grandmother along with her mother Erica
Erica Allen	Roxanna Nic Liam	2018–2025	Went to live with her mother after jilting Doug Ferguson at the altar
Liam Plunkett	Aidan Kelly	2020, 2024–2025	Moved to India
Liam Plunkett	Phelim Drew	2020–2021	
Elaine Hegarty-Halpin	Sorcha Herlihy	2025	Left following her ex-husband Mark's arrest for the murder of his sister Laura
Ruth Brennan	Kacey Wallace	2010–2025	Went to live with her mother in Spain
John "Bosco" Walsh	Rory Cowan	2019–2025	Departed offscreen
Mark Halpin	Ryan O'Shaughnessy	2001–2010	
Mark Halpin	Cal Kenealy	2010–2011, 2018, 2022, 2024–2025	Went to prison for killing his sister Laura
Bob Charles	Bryan Murray	2005–2025	Departed offscreen due to the actor's dementia diagnosis
Dearbhla Dillon	Kerrie O'Sullivan	2010–2012	
Dearbhla Dillon	Maria Oxley Boardman	2018–2025	Moved to Los Angeles permanently
Anna MacShane	Colleen Keogh	2021–2024	Moved to Limerick for a new job
Katy O'Brien	Amilia Keating	2014–2019, 2024	Left after refusing to involve herself in a plan to trap Tyler Munroe, believing him to be Laura Halpin's killer
Jimmy Doyle	David Mitchell	1991–2008, 2024	Went to Spain with his sister Suzanne after being released from prison, to visit his family before returning to Australia
Suzanne Doyle	Sarah Flood	1989–2013, 2024	Returned to Spain with her brother Jimmy after his release from prison
Jack Gleeson	Ryan Keogh	2011–2024	Went to live with his father in the USA
Maria Purcell	Aisling Kearns	2022–2023	Moved to Sligo
Bela Doyle	Jim Bartley	1989–2023	Departed off-screen after the actor retired
Jane Black	Rachel Pilkington	2013–2023	Departed off-screen
Dermot Fahey	Seamus Power	1997–2017, 2022–2023	Left for a new job after being released from prison for killing Cian Howley.
John Deegan	Tommy O'Neill	2001–2023	Departed off-screen due to the actor's health troubles
Jon McCarthy	Paul McQuaid	2022–2023	Went on a World tour with his band.
Kelly Allen	Charleigh Bailey	2011–2016, 2023	Left again after making amends with her sister Zoe
Charlotte Bishop	Martha Fitzpatrick	2009–2019, 2022	Returned to Glasgow
Lee Collins	Dave Kelly	2018–2021	Moved to London after the death of Will Casey.
Darragh Collins	Ben Condron	2018–2021	Moved to London after the death of Will Casey.
Cristiano San Martin	Rodrigo Ternevoy	2017–2022	Moved to Brussels with his boyfriend Patrick.
Heather Daly	Úna Kavanagh	2003–2009, 2014–2019, 2021	Went back to Brazil.
Wayne Molloy	Stephen Swift	1999, 2005, 2008	
Wayne Molloy	Victor Burke	1992–1997, 2009–2019	Departed offscreen after splitting from wife Orla Kirwan
Farrah Phelan	Fiona Glascott	1998–1999	
Farrah Phelan	Sinead Keenan	1999–2000	
Farrah Phelan	Denise McCormack	2000–2003	
Farrah Phelan	Caroline Harvey	2014–2019	
Eoghan O'Brien	Alan Howley	2014–2020	Moved to Galway with his elderly dementia suffering mother
Emmett Fitzgerald	Colin O'Donoghue	2005	
Barry O'Hanlon	Pat Nolan	1989–2011, 2019–2020	Locked up in jail for manslaughter in 2011 then moved away from Carrigstown following his release
Niamh Cassidy	Clelia Murphy	1996–2017	Fled Carrigstown with her husband Paul Brennan's life savings
Pierce Devlin	Daryl McCormack	2014–2016	
Yvonne Doyle	Alex MacDowall	1991–1998	
Yvonne Doyle	Ciara O'Callaghan	1998–2004, 2008–2014	Leaves Carrigstown for a fresh start after being raped.
Anthony Brady	Ciaran Reilly	2002–2009	Moved to Cork to accept a job as a publisher.
Adam Bermingham	Alan McMahon	2007–2008	Moved to Manchester to continue his studies.
Xavier "Zumo" Bishop	Patrick Fitzpatrick	2007–2013, 2016	Left with his mother and sister after his father was murdered. He returned briefly in 2016 for his brother Decco's wedding.
Connie Boylan	Lisa Harding	2009–2010	Moved back to Australia to care for her father, Ronan.
Russell Brown	Conor Delaney	2011	Moved to the United States with his partner Ingrid and her children Clara and Joey.
Caitriona Cassidy	Louise Meade	1999–2014	Moved to Manchester to stay with her sister Kira.
Patricia Collins	Bairbre Ní Chaoimh	????–2010	Moved to Mullingar, County Westmeath, with severe liver damage from alcohol abuse.
Jennifer Conway	Karen Ardiff	????–2010	Applied for a job transfer to Galway, her home county.
Kay Costello	Sheila McWade	1989–2008	Moved to Limerick to find employment there.
Malachy Costello	Gerard Byrne	1996–2009	Moved out of Ireland, with his partner Lara and her daughter Jane.
Ursula Cruise	Anna Manahan	2004–2009	Moved to live in England with her son, Enda.
Robert Daly	Sam Peter Corry	2009–2012	Moved to Belfast to accept a job as a lecturer.
Terry Deegan	Julie Hale	2001–2007	Moved to Dublin to look after her elderly parents.
T.J. "Tony Jr" Deegan	Ian Kenny	2006–2007	Moved to Dublin with his mother, Terry, to look after his grandparents.
Troy Dowling	Andrew Macklin	2008–2009, 2017, 2020	Moved to Benidorm to accept a job as a DJ. He returned for two weeks in March 2017 to visit his family.
Geraldine Fahey	Carmel Stephens	2002–2009	Moved out of Ireland after becoming impoverished.
Sylvester Garrigan	Frank O'Sullivan	2005–2006	He is assumed to be in prison.
Felix Jones	Yare Jegbefume	2009–2010	Returned to South Africa to become a patron for a local charity.
Kylie Kavanagh	Vicky Burke	2004–2009	Moved to live with her mother Siobhan in Spain after being dumped.
Bernie Kelly	Mary McNamara	1989–2009	Moved to Canada with relatives after the death of her mother, Mags.
Bernie Kelly	Fionnuala Murphy	2023	Moved to Canada with relatives after the death of her mother, Mags.
Gloria Leahy	Meagan Keogh	????–????	Left Ireland searching for her real father, confused over his identity.
Avi Bar Lev	Asaf B. Goldfrid	2009–2011	Abandoned business partnership with Pete and fled to London.
James "Ringo" Leyden	Keith Duffy	2008–2009	Moved to Sierra Leone to become involved in work for a charity.
Seamus McAleer	Vinnie McCabe	2005–2008	Left Ireland to stay with daughter Lauren in Spain after Bill murdered Annette.
Philip McGuckian	Joe Taylor	????–????	Fled after being unable to pay back a loan taken from a loanshark.
Tracey McGuigan	Hilda Fay	2001–2008	Fled to Manchester after a dispute with a gangster.
Robin McKenna	Orlaith Rafter	2001–2009	Moved to accept a job in Cork, offered by her ex-boyfriend Lennie.
Paschal Mulvey	Brendan Cauldwell	1996–2005	Left to go live with his girlfriend Lily abroad.
Lara Newman	Eilis O'Donnell	2009	Moved out of Ireland, leaving with her daughter Jane and Malachy.
Cliodhna Norris	Aisling Bea	2009	Followed her boyfriend Ringo to Sierra Leone.
Una Norris	Sandra Curran	2007–2009	Moved to Sierra Leone, recovering from the devastation caused by her brother Turlough's death.
Shelly O'Connor	Hilary Reynolds	1999, 2000, 2004	Left Carrigstown.
Baz O'Reilly	Pat Ainscough	2004	Followed his female companion to a hideout in Surrey.
David Osbourne	Mat Fraser	2010–2011	Left to accept a job in Limerick alongside his brother.
Duncan Stonehouse	Nathan Gordon	????–2010	Left Ireland and enlisted with the Army in London.
Aoife Stringer	Laoisha O'Callaghan	????–????	Moved to Manchester to continue with her studies.
Judith Dillon	Catherine Byrne	2010–2014	Moved to Munich.
Neasa Dillon	Aobhin Garrihy	2010–2013	Moved to the USA.
Caoimhe Dillon	Aoibheann McCaul	2010–2019	Moved to Munich.
Harmony Collins	Eleanor O'Brien	2018	
Aaron White	Ethan Dodd	2018–2020	
Kurt Whelan	Johnny Ward	2005	
Samantha "Sam" Bishop	Mia Rongavilla	2018–2020	Moved to Spain with her father, Decco
Terence Cooney	Terry McMahon	????–1996, 2008–????	
D.I Steve Yates	Nigel Mercier	2006–2021	Left Carrigstown following a suspension following sexual assault allegations.

== Characters who are dead or believed to be dead ==
Character	Actor	Year	Status
Charlie Kelly	Tom Jordan	1989–2019	Charlie died off screen in Canada in his sleep.
Mags Kelly	Joan Brosnan Walsh	1989–2009	Died in Canada after a natural disaster.
Tony Kelly	Darragh Kelly	1989–1997	Killed by a London criminal (Reg) who he owed money to. It was the first on-screen murder in the show.
Helen Doyle	Kira Carroll	1989–1998	Died in hospital after a car accident.
Rita Doyle	Jean Costello	1989–2008, 2010	Died of natural causes after her daughter Yvonne granted her wish not to be resuscitated.
Harry Molloy	Paul Raynor	1990–2005	Missing, assumed dead.
Lorraine Molloy	Maeve McGrath	1991–2000	Killed in a hurricane on her honeymoon.
Hannah Finnegan	Pat Leavy	1992–2003	Died of natural causes after the actress died.
Eunice Dunstan	Joan O'Hara	1994–2007	Died of natural causes after the actress died.
Mike Gleeson	Seamus Moran	1996–2008	Electrocuted by a number of rogue loose electrical wires in a substation.
Christy Phelan	Tom Hopkins	1998–2014	Collapsed from a couch and died from a heart attack months after suffering a stroke.
Floyd Phelan	Simon Keogh	1998–2008	Died from cancer.
Lorcan Foley, Snr	Killian O'Sullivan	1999–2006	Shot dead by Garda officer Rory Goff after a vicious struggle.
Billy Meehan	Stuart Dunne	2000–2001	Battered to death with a golf club by Lorcan Foley.
Tess Halpin	Sabina Brennan	2001–2003	Murdered by husband Marty. She was a victim of domestic abuse and ultimately strangled by her husband, who went on to kill himself. She is survived by sons Damian and Mark and daughter Laura.
Sarah O'Leary	Gemma Doorly	2001–2011	Killed by Barry in a freak accident.
Marty Halpin	Paul Lee	2002–2003	Killed himself after he murdered his wife Tess Halpin.
Lana Dowling	Tatiana Ouliankina	2003–2007	Kidnapped after a shopping trip in 2007, missing for about a year before Mick Mahoney found her remains in the Dublin Mountains.
Dominic Kavanagh	Joe Gallagher	2005–2008	Died alone in London after embarking on a drink and drugs binge in regret of the awful treatment of his partner and daughter.
Jessica Molloy	Victoria O'Connor	2003–2005	Drug overdose on an ecstasy tablet that had been lost under the family home's suede couch after a night of babysitting went awry.
Angela O'Connell	Anne Kent	2005–2009, 2016	Ran away, after being exposed as a thief, returns for 3 months in 2016 but died of heart attack in December.
Gabriel Udenze	George Seremba	2005–2006	Burned to death in an arson attack on his home.
Mick Mahoney	Fran Brennan	2005–2007	Mentioned in January 2026 that JJ Nash and Ali Foley attended his funeral offscreen.
Gina Cassidy	Deirdre Lawless	2007	Was killed by Barry O'Hanlon on her wedding day outside the church on her new husband Ray's motorbike.
Bill Taylor	Jonathan Ryan	2009	Died from injuries sustained in a fire while murdering his wife.
Luke Dillon	Liam Heffernan	2012–2013	Killed when he was trapped under a slab of concrete while trying to rescue his brother Tommy from a fire in Leo Dowling's factory.
Kerri-Ann Bishop	Jenny Dixon	2013–2018	Stabbed by Aoife O'Neill after she murdered her daughter, Karen.
Paddy Bishop	Andrew M. Connolly	2013	Stabbed by his daughter Charlotte after a struggle in the house.
Robbie Quinn	Karl Shiels	2014–2019	Died off screen as actor Karl Shiels had died unexpectedly.
Karen O'Neil	Kate Gilmore	2016–2018	Stabbed by Kerri-Ann Bishop.
Will Casey	John Cronin	2018–2021	Killed by Lee Collins.
Cian Howley	Adam Weafer	2018–2022	Stabbed to death by Dermot Fahey with a chubb key on a building site.
Laura Halpin	Ruth Gilligan	2001–2005	Murdered by her brother Mark offscreen.
Laura Halpin	Liana O'Cleirigh	2011–2022	Murdered by her brother Mark offscreen.
Anto Collins	Paul Ronan	2018–2025	Killed by Mondo O'Connell

== Celebrity cameos ==
The following famous faces have appeared in Fair City. Reg E. Cathey has expressed a wish to appear in Fair City, as has Verity Rushworth.

Character	Year	Status
Waylon Gary White Deer	2025	Came on a surprise visit to his old friend Cass Cassidy after Cass cancelled his trip to the Chocktaw nation for his 86th birthday
Soulé	2022	Appeared as a musical guest in The Station
Gordon Snell	2011	Appeared at Bob's fundraiser
Maeve Binchy	2011	Appeared at Bob's fundraiser
Joe Duffy	2010	Bob talked to him on his Liveline radio programme about getting compensation from Louie
Larry Gogan	2008	Officially opened the community centre
Shane MacGowan	2008	Appeared at a concert held in the city
Marty Whelan	2005	Officially reopened McCoys
Gay Byrne	1990	Appeared as himself when former character Lily Corcoran was featured in audience of The Late Late Show
