= Karl Shiels =

Irish actor (1971–2019)

- Born: 25 September 1971; Chapelizod, Dublin, Ireland
- Died: 15 July 2019 (aged 47); Waterford, Ireland
- Education: Gaiety School of Acting
- Occupation: Actor
- Years active: 1998–2019
- Agent: Lisa Richard
- Notable work: Henry IV, Part 1 Penelope; At Swim-Two-Birds; The Spanish Tragedy; The Duchess of Malfi; The Shadow of a Gunman; This Lime Tree Bower
- Television: Fair City (2014–2019); Peaky Blinders; The Tudors; Into the Badlands; Titanic: Blood and Steel; The Clinic; Doctors
- Spouse: Dearbhla (divorced)
- Partner: Laura Honan
- Children: 2
- Awards: Best Actor; Dublin Theatre Festival 1999; Judge's Special Prize; The Irish Times Theatre Awards 2013

Karl Shiels (25 September 1971 – 15 July 2019) was an Irish actor of both stage and screen.

His stage roles included Henry IV, Part 1, Penelope, At Swim-Two-Birds, The Spanish Tragedy, The Duchess of Malfi, The Shadow of a Gunman and This Lime Tree Bower. His screen roles included Fair City, Peaky Blinders and Batman Begins.

He died suddenly at the age of 47, with a play he had directed underway in Dublin and an ongoing screen role as Robbie Quinn in Fair City.

== Career ==
He took up performance in the early 1990s, training with the Gaiety School of Acting. In 1998, he debuted with the Abbey Theatre.

Among his stage theatre credits were Henry IV, Part 1, Beauty in a Broken Place, At Swim-Two-Birds and The Barbaric Comedies (those four for the Abbey), The Spanish Tragedy, The Duchess of Malfi, The Shadow of a Gunman, Conor McPherson's This Lime Tree Bower and Mark O'Rowe's Howie the Rookie, as well as the Druid Theatre Company production of Enda Walsh's Penelope.

Shiels was artistic director of the Theatre Upstairs (above Lanigan's Bar on Eden Quay), and, before this, he had a company, Semper Fi.

Among his screen credits were the films Batman Begins and Veronica Guerin, as well as the television series Peaky Blinders, The Tudors, Into the Badlands, Titanic: Blood and Steel, The Clinic and Doctors. He played Robbie Quinn in the soap opera Fair City between 2014 and his death in 2019. As Quinn he held many high-profile storylines alongside the actress Aisling O'Neill, who portrayed his on-screen lover Carol Foley. Quinn appeared on screen the night before his death in scenes with Carol, and also became embroiled in disputes with the characters Nora and Ray in the same episode. He had worked on set up to two days before dying, the break only coming about due to the arrival of the weekend. He had also been expected to play a leading role in the 30th anniversary episode, scheduled for September 2019.

== Awards and nominations ==
In 1999, Shiels won Best Actor at the Dublin Theatre Festival for his performance in Comedians. In 2004, he was nominated in the Best Actor category at the Irish Film and Television Academy (IFTA) awards for his performance in Capital Letters. In 2010, he was nominated in the Best Actor category at The Stage Awards. In 2011, he was nominated in the Best Actor category at The Irish Times Theatre Awards. In 2013, The Irish Times Theatre Awards presented him with the Judge's Special Prize for his theatre work and involvement in developing fresh stage talent. In 2016, he was nominated in the Best Actor category at the IFTAs.

== Personal life ==
Karl Shiels was born in Chapelizod, Dublin, on 25 September 1971. He was a cousin of Twin Peaks: The Return actress Amy Shiels. He worked as an electrician until he turned to acting. In addition, Shiels directed the play Bullfight on Third Avenue, which was running at The Bewley's Café Theatre when he died and was scheduled to run throughout the month.

== Death ==
Karl Shiels died suddenly of natural causes at his partner’s family home in Waterford, on 15 July 2019, aged 47. His colleagues in Fair City were informed of his death that morning and the news was relayed to the public that lunchtime. Shiels was the second actor on the soap opera to die in less than a month, following the death of Tom Jordan a little over a fortnight earlier in June. Shiels was survived by his partner Laura Honan, and his twin daughters, Iseabel and Saoirse, from his marriage to Dearbhla, which ended in divorce. He was also survived by his father Harry, stepmother Irene, brother Jason, sisters Lisa and Lianne, and stepbrother Justin. Shiels' funeral took place at the Church of Our Lady Mother of the Church, Beechpark Avenue, Castleknock, and he was cremated at Newlands Cross Crematorium.

== Filmography ==
Year	Title	Role	Notes
2003	Mystics	Barry	
2003	Veronica Guerin	Gilligan Gang Member #1	
2003	Intermission	Wayne	
2004	Capital Letters	Keely	
2005	Batman Begins	Arkham Thug #3	
2007	W.C.	Rodney	
2007	Waiting for Dublin	Vito	
2008	Eden	Breffni Grehan	
2009	Savage	Eddie	
2011	Haywire	Goatee	
2012	Shadow Dancer	Mulville's Driver / Gunman	
2012	Stitches	Boss Clown	
2014	Noble	Driver	
2014	Davin	Damo	
2015	The Hit Producer	John 'The Elk	
