= Sabina Brennan =

Irish neuroscientist, psychologist and actress

- Education: Maynooth University; Trinity College Dublin
- Scientific career
- Fields: Neuroscience, Psychology
- Workplaces: Trinity College Dublin
- Thesis: Neurocognitive and electrophysiological indices of cognitive performance in ageing (2011)
- Doctoral advisor: Ian Robertson
- Website: www.sabinabrennan.ie

Sabina Brennan is an Irish neuroscientist, psychologist, and former television actress. She is currently an adjunct assistant professor working at Trinity College Dublin.

== Early life and family ==
Brennan is the youngest of five children. Her father worked for Irish Life and she followed him into this business after finishing school. She is married and has two sons.

== Acting ==
Brennan's enthusiasm for acting was noted when she was eight years old by her drama teacher who suggested private lessons to her parents, and Brennan returned to this interest after taking voluntary redundancy from Irish Life. She studied for her teacher's diploma at the Guildhall School of Music and Drama, and spent ten years as a full-time actor. She appeared in over 160 episodes of the Irish television series Fair City as Tess Halpin. Her character was fatally strangled as part of a high-profile domestic abuse storyline.

== Scientific career ==
After leaving Fair City, Brennan completed an undergraduate degree in psychology at Maynooth University before pursuing a PhD on changes in the brain associated with aging with Ian Robertson at Trinity College Dublin. She completed her PhD studies in 2011 on "Neurocognitive and electrophysiological indices of cognitive performance in ageing". She has published over 40 articles on brain health, dementia and cognitive function in aging adults. Through this work she has investigated the importance of building resilience for brain health through mental stimulation and exercise (amongst other factors), which has formed the foundations of much of her subsequent research. She was co-director of the Neuro-Enhancement for Independent Lives (NEIL) research programme granted by Atlantic Philanthropies to develop interventions to slow or halt cognitive decline. She was a co-applicant of a successful European Union Framework Programme 7 funding project, which established the Hello Brain website and app to enable people to engage with brain research and to provide tips on protecting brain health.

She is active in national and international media, particularly in discussions about dementia and ageing. With funding from the NEIL project, she developed a series of films addressing memory loss and brain health with Trinity College Dublin and Trinity Brain Health called Freedem. In 2016, Brennan was a Trinity College Dublin candidate for a seat in Seanad Éireann but was unsuccessful. In 2019, her book 100 Days to a Younger Brain was published by Orion Spring.

== Awards ==
- 2018: Image Women of the Year
- 2017: Science Foundation Ireland Outstanding Contribution to Science Communication Award for her work on the 'Hello Brain' project
- 2017: Trinity Innovation Award for Societal Impact
