= Martina Stanley =

Irish actress

- Occupation: Actress

Martina Stanley is an Irish actress born in Clifden Co.Galway known primarily for her acting work in soap opera Fair City. She plays Dolores Molloy, a former hairdresser who lives in Carrigstown.

Stanley's other acting credits include Memento Mori (1992) playing Nurse Lucy, and The Lonely Passion of Judith Hearne (1987) playing Sister Mary-Paul. As well as television and film work, Stanley is also an accomplished stage actress, having appeared in a variety of plays over the past 30 years.

In 1979 Stanley moved to Dublin from Galway and joined the Abbey Theatre

She is the longest serving actress on Fair City playing Dolores since 1993

Martinas daughter Kate Stanley Brennan is also an actress

== See also ==
- List of Fair City characters
- List of longest-serving soap opera actors#Ireland
