= Gareth Russell (author) =

British historian and author

- Born: Belfast, Northern Ireland
- Education: Down High Grammar School; St Peter's College, Oxford
- Occupation: Author
- Writing career
- Genres: History, historical fiction, young-adult fiction
- Notable works: Queen James; The Palace; Young and Damned and Fair

Gareth Russell is a Northern Irish historian, author, and broadcaster.

== Early life and education ==
Gareth Russell was born in Belfast, Northern Ireland. He attended Down High Grammar School, and later graduated from St Peter's College, Oxford, where he studied modern history. Russell completed a Master's degree, First Class Honours with Commendation, in medieval history at Queen's University, Belfast.

From 2015 to 2020, he divided his time between Belfast and New York. From 2023, he has divided his time between Belfast and London.

== Career ==
Russell is the author of a series of plays. In July 2011, his first novel Popular was published by Penguin, as the first in a new series of novels following the lives of a group of Belfast teenagers. It was published in German in 2014. It and its sequel were subsequently adapted for the stage in Northern Ireland, followed by a final theatrical sequel, Say You'll Remember Me, in 2016.

In 2014, Russell's first non-fiction book, The Emperors: How Europe's Rulers were Destroyed by World War One, was published.

In 2017, his biography of English queen consort Catherine Howard was published, based on research undertaken between 2010 and 2016. It was a finalist for the Slightly Foxed Best First Biography award in 2017, which was won that year by Edmund Gordon's biography of Angela Carter.

In 2019, his account of the Titanic disaster was published. It was named a Book of the Year by The Times and a Best History Book of 2019 by The Daily Telegraph.

In 2022, his biography of Queen Elizabeth the Queen Mother was published. It was his second book to become a Times Book of the Year.

He was a main contributor to BBC Northern Ireland's and Al Jazeera's coverage for the death and funeral of Queen Elizabeth II and accession of Charles III.

In 2023, Russell's The Palace: From the Tudors to the Windsors, 500 Years of History at Hampton Court was published. It was named a BBC History Book of the Year.

In 2025, his book Queen James was published. It was a BBC History and Daily Mail Book of the Year. It was published in North America under the title The Six Loves of James I. In 2026, it was adapted into a docu-drama by the BBC, with Russell as its presenter and starring James McArdle as James. It won one of the Royal Television Society's awards for Best Documentary in 2026.

In April 2026, Russell appeared as a guest host for a series of episodes of the History Hit podcast After Dark alongside regular host Anthony Delaney, during host Madeleine Pelling's maternity leave.

== Bibliography ==
=== Novels ===
- Popular (2011)
- The Immaculate Deception (2012)

=== Non-Fiction ===
- The Emperors: How Europe's Rulers were destroyed by World War I (2014)
- An Illustrated Introduction to the Tudors (2014)
- A History of the English Monarchy from Boadicea to Elizabeth I (2015)
- Young and Damned and Fair: The Life of Catherine Howard, Fifth Wife of King Henry VIII (US title) (2017)
  - In the UK, this book's subtitle is The Life and Tragedy of Catherine Howard at the Court of Henry VIII
- The Ship of Dreams: The Sinking of the Titanic and the End of the Edwardian Era (2019), originally published as The Darksome Bounds of a Failing World in the UK and Ireland
- Do Let's Have Another Drink: The Singular Wit and Double Measures of Queen Elizabeth the Queen Mother (2022). In the US and Canada, the book is Do Let's Have Another Drink: The Dry Wit and Fizzy Life of Queen Elizabeth the Queen Mother.
- The Palace: From the Tudors to the Windsors, 500 Years of History at Hampton Court (2023)
- Queen James: The Lives and Loves of Britain's First King (London: William Collins, 2025). Published in North America as The Six Loves of James I. (New York: Atria Books, 2025).
