= Rosemary Henderson =

Irish actress

- Born: Rosemary Henderson
- Occupation: Actress
- Years active: 1986–present
- Spouse: Derek Seymour

Rosemary Henderson (born 1961), also known as Rose, is an Irish actress. She is known for playing Sister Assumpta in the Father Ted episodes "And God Created Woman" and "Cigarettes and Alcohol and Rollerblading".

== Background ==
Henderson is from Dublin, Ireland. After graduating from Alexandra College secondary school, she began work as a secretary at Guinness. In 1983, she left Guinness to become an actress. She is married to Derek Seymour, an executive at Allied Irish Banks, with whom she has 4 children. She lives in Dún Laoghaire. Henderson is a Presbyterian.

== Career ==
Henderson has worked mainly in theatre and television. As a teenager, she attended the Betty Ann Norton summer school. As an adult, she undertook training at the Dublin Oscar Theatre School of Acting from 1981 to 1982 and at Stefan Niedziałkowski's American School of Polish Mime from 1983 to 1984. She took an 11-year hiatus, to raise her family.

Henderson has written several plays and has performed at the Peacock Theatre, Gaiety Theatre, Bewley's Café Theatre and in the Dublin Fringe Festival. She was nominated for a Hennessy Literary Award for her short story, The Box. She is also known for appearing in the music video for the 1987 Def Leppard hit "Pour Some Sugar on Me".

== Filmography ==
Year	Title	Role
2025	Kit & Nitro: Cybernetic Investigators	Barbara
2025	Abode	Molly
2025	Romance is Dad	Maura
2024	'Tis the Season to Be Irish	Mary O’Loughlin
2024	Mob The Trench (short)	Gran
2024	Dear Imelda	Imelda
2022	Wireless (short)	Ziggy
2022	Dublin Crust	Daisy
2021	Chicken Out	Marian
2021	As Luck Would Have It	Adelia Gallagher
2019	A Deal's A Deal	Kate
2019	Ordinary Love	Woman #2
2019	Rip to the Rescue!	Mammy
2017	Nowhere Fast	Cepta
2016	The Middle Finger	Dennis' Mother
2015	Penny Dreadful	Nun
2014	A Nightingale Falling	Mrs. Johnston
2013	Swords: Building	Landlady
2012	Earthbound	Mrs. Reilly
2012	Fair City	Val O'Dwyer
2011	Sometimes People...	Emily's Mother
2011	The Centre of the Universe	Nan
2010	Single-Handed	Breda
2010	Raw	Registrar
2009	Belonging to Laura	Rosaleen Fitzpatrick
1998	Soft Sand, Blue Sea	Christine
1995-1996	Father Ted	Sister Assumpta (2 episodes)
1992	The Bargain Shop	Newsreader
1989	Dear Sarah	Maggie
1988	Nighthawks	
1986	Pajo's Junkbox	Grabbit
