= Abode (disambiguation) =

An abode or dwelling is a self-contained unit of accommodation used by one or more households as a home.

Abode may also refer to:

- House, a human-built dwelling with enclosing walls, a floor, and a roof
  - Right of abode
- Abode (film), a 2025 Irish film
- World of Two Moons a.k.a. Abode, a fictional Earth-type planet featured in the comic book Elfquest
