= Harry Wild =

Irish crime comedy-drama television programme

- TV series logo
- Genre: Cosy mystery; Comedy drama; Crime
- Created by: David Logan
- Starring: Jane Seymour; Rohan Nedd; Kevin Ryan; Aoife Mulholland; Paul Tylak
- Composer: Ray Harman
- Country of origin: Ireland
- Original language: English
- No. of series: 5
- No. of episodes: 34

Production
- Executive producers: Jane Seymour; David McLoughlin; Daniel March; David Logan; Jo Spain; James Flynn; James Gibb
- Running time: 45 minutes
- Production companies: Ardvella Entertainment; Dynamic Television; Metropolitan Films International; Metropolitan Pictures

Original release
- Network: Acorn TV
- Release: 4 April 2022 – present

Harry Wild is an Irish detective comedy-drama television series created by David Logan and starring Jane Seymour as Harriet "Harry" Wild, a retired literature professor with a knack for solving mysteries. The series premiered on Acorn TV on 4 April 2022. The second series premiered on 9 October 2023, and the third on 13 May 2024. On 30 July 2024, a fourth series was confirmed, which premiered on 5 May 2025. The fifth season premiered on 22 June 2026.

== Cast ==
- Jane Seymour as Harriet "Harry" Wild, a retired literature professor who finds she has a knack for solving mysteries
- Rohan Nedd as Fergus Reid, a high school student assisting Harry in her investigations
- Kevin Ryan as Charlie Wild, Harry's son
- Rose O'Neill as Lola Wild, Charlie's daughter and Fergus' girlfriend, who assists Harry in her investigations
- Amy Huberman as Orla Wild, Charlie's wife (Series 1–3)
- Aoife Mulholland as Orla Wild, Charlie's wife (Series 4)
- Paul Tylak as Glenn Talbot, a friend of Harry who frequents her local pub, who gets pulled into Harry's investigations
- Danielle Ryan as Vicky Boyle
- Anthony Delaney as Jordan McDonald
- Ciara O'Callaghan as Vivian Tierney-Mitchell
- Shane Lynch as Malky Reid
- Samantha Mumba as Paula Kenny (series 2–)
- Rosa Willow Lee as Liberty Reid
- Baz Black as Setana (series 5)

== Episodes ==
Series	Episodes	Originally released	
Series	Episodes	First released	Last released
Season 1 (2022)	8	3 April 2022	3 April 2022
Season 2 (2023)	6	8 October 2023	5 November 2023
Season 3 (2024)	6	12 May 2024	9 June 2024
Season 4 (2025)	8	4 May 2025	26 December 2025
Season 5 (2026)	6	22 June 2026	27 July 2026

== Reception ==
On Rotten Tomatoes, the first season has a rating of 50% based on six reviews. Joel Keller from Decider gave it a positive review, writing, "Harry Wild stars a very game Jane Seymour in the most dynamic role she's had in some time. But the mysteries and backstories need to be tightened up for the show to succeed." Eilis O'Hanlon from the Sunday Independent gave it a negative review, writing "There's nothing wrong with dark humour, but the show didn't commit to the mood enough to make the pay-off feel earned."
