= Yvonne Doyle (Fair City) =

Fictional character in Irish soap opera

- Fair City character
- Ciara O'Callaghan as Yvonne Doyle
- Portrayed by: Alex MacDowall (1991–2004); Ciara O'Callaghan (2008–2014)
- Duration: 1991–2004, 2008–2014
- First appearance: 1991
- Last appearance: 2014
- Introduced by: Margaret Gleeson
In-universe information
- Occupation: Restaurant manager and owner
- Father: Bela Doyle
- Mother: Rita Doyle
- Brothers: Jimmy Doyle; Darren Doyle
- Sisters: Suzanne Halpin; Louise Doyle; Helen Doyle
- Spouse: Mike Gleeson (1997–2002)
- Sons: Stephen Doyle
- Daughters: Ruth Brennan
- Grandmothers: Hannah Finnegan
- Uncles: Vincent Finnegan
- Aunts: Doreen Finnegan
- Other relatives: Louie Gleeson; Damien Halpin

Yvonne Doyle (also Gleeson) is a fictional character in the Irish soap opera Fair City. She was originally portrayed by Alex MacDowall (sister of Sarah MacDowall who plays Suzanne Doyle) and subsequently by Ciara O'Callaghan. The show's former female antagonist, she has had affairs with both men and women. She marries Mike Gleeson and has an affair with his younger brother Louie following Mike's death. She is then involved in Fair City's first on-screen lesbian kiss with her Australian girlfriend Connie in 2009.

== Backstory ==
Yvonne first appears as a member of the Doyle family. She is a daughter of Bela and Rita.

== Development ==
=== Mike Gleeson ===
After spending a few years in London to live with her sister Helen, Yvonne arrives back in Carrigstown in 1991. In 1998 she is deeply affected by Helen's death in a car accident. A few years later, she begins a relationship with Mike Gleeson whom Helen had jilted at the altar in 1997 and marries him. She is ruthless and passes this streak onto her husband. She is always very domineering and self-centered, ordering Mike around in an effort to move up in the world.

Making money is Yvonne's favourite hobby, but in 2002 her greed causes her to burn all her bridges with Mike, family and friends, cultivating in Yvonne developing schizophrenia and making a suicide attempt at Christmas. Mike finds the drugged Yvonne and takes her to hospital. Yvonne vows to be a good person from then on and they reconcile, but she soon goes back to her old ways.

=== Richard Ashton ===
Acquiring a partnership in both the Bistro and Rainbows Café, Yvonne becomes intoxicated with power. Growing tired of being married with Mike whom she now considers boring, Yvonne has an affair with Richard Ashton in 2003 who she met through Mike's business dealings with him. She later finds out that she's pregnant with Richard's child and gets caught out by Mike.

In 2004, a drunken Yvonne and Richard are involved in a hit and run when, while kissing each other, Richard takes his eye off the road and Yvonne watches in horror as he knocks down a child. The two of them run away, but the child's mother later recognises her. The pair subsequently flee the country, with Yvonne emigrating to Australia. She then lives there with her baby son.

=== Return ===
On 2 September 2008, Yvonne returns to Ireland for Mike's funeral entering wearing a hat and starting an argument with Mike's former girlfriend Geraldine Fahey at his graveside. She irritates Geraldine and tells Bela and Suzanne that she is back to hear Mike's will. Eventually Yvonne obtains her share of the business as she buys it off Mike's brother who has been given shares in the will. Yvonne then becomes ruthless towards her family as she was caring for her mother Rita after her stroke and Yvonne leaves the Doyle household and Rita collapses after her being so uncaring by leaving her home on her own. Bela then throws Yvonne out after she says Rita would be better off being dead or being left in a home.

=== Bisexuality ===
In late 2009, it is revealed that Yvonne is bisexual. Her girlfriend (Connie) from Australia arrives, and is surprised to learn that Yvonne has never mentioned her to her family, and even more surprised when she discovers that Yvonne is in a relationship with her deceased husband's brother-in-law Louie Gleeson. Connie and Yvonne subsequently share a kiss, the first time a lesbian kiss is portrayed on Fair City. Yvonne and Connie plan to marry in Northern Ireland in the summer of 2010. When Yvonne gives birth to her child Ruth (whom Paul fathered) Connie leaves for Australia with Yvonne intent on putting the baby up for adoption. In May 2010, Yvonne leaves Carrigstown and leaves Ruth with Niamh, Paul's wife, having earlier slept with Paul behind Connie's back in September 2009. Her son Stephen, fathered by her former partner Richard, is in care as a result of her drug abuse.

In January 2013, Yvonne shocks her family when she speaks at the funeral of her mother Rita, informing the mourners how ashamed her mother would be of her bickering family.

=== Rape ===
In 2013, Yvonne is raped by Martin, a man she meets on a dating site. She is supported through this difficult time by Carol Foley, whom she had been feuding with. This changes Carol and Yvonne's relationship and they become great friends. She then begins dating Dan.

In 2014, Yvonne leaves Carrigstown to make a fresh start.

== Reception ==
The Irish Independent has described Yvonne as "the woman everyone loves to hate".

Ciara O’Callaghan has received letters of admiration from gay people and she has been nominated for a TVNow Award for 'Favourite Female Soap Star' for her portrayal of Yvonne.

== See also ==
- LGBT history in Ireland
- List of media portrayals of bisexuality
- List of LGBT characters in television and radio
