= Putin: The New Tsar =

2018 British documentary by Patrick Forbes

Putin: The New Tsar is 2018 a documentary produced by OxfordFilms/BBC and directed by Patrick Forbes, airing on BBC2. It discusses Vladimir Putin's rise to power. Interview subjects include politicians and non-politicians, with some being Russian and others being foreigners.

== Contents ==
Among the participants are Garry Kasparov, a chess prodigy; Mikhail Khodorkovsky, an oligarch; Sergei Pugachev, who was in Putin's power network; Ksenia Sobchak, a member of Russian high society; Ian Robertson, a psychologist from Trinity College Dublin; and Jack Straw, a British politician. Robertson stated that Putin's experience in a high political position "profoundly changed" his brain.

Ed Power of The Daily Telegraph stated that Putin: The New Tsar's "true purpose was to place in historical context Putin's unlikely rise from provincial obscurity in St Petersburg" to being the President of Russia. It was produced prior to the 2018 Russian presidential election. Power stated that it "fleetingly touched upon" allegations of Russian agents attacking enemies of the Russian government outside of Russia.

== Reception ==
Sam Wollaston of The Guardian gave the film four of five stars and stated that Putin: The New Tsar "could almost be funny if it weren't so scary".

Power gave the film four of five stars. He stated that "an attempt to diagnose Putin as an addict to absolute power" as the film's "biggest error". He concluded the film was "otherwise an exemplary portrayal of" Putin.

The Moscow Times praised the dispassionate tone in the narrator and the "[crisp] and [coherent]" pace. It criticised the "clichéd title", the lack of coverage of Russian political opposition, and overstating the level of support Putin has among Russian citizens. The paper concluded that Putin: The New Tsar is "very much worth tracking down and talking up."
