= Joan Brosnan Walsh =

Irish actress (1938–2009)

- Born: 29 June 1938; Greystones, County Wicklow
- Died: 20 December 2009 (aged 71); Malahide, County Dublin, Ireland
- Other name: Joan Brosnan-Walsh
- Occupation: Actress
- Years active: 1989–2009 (her death)
- Spouse: Willie Walsh
- Children: 3

Joan Brosnan Walsh (29 June 1938 – 20 December 2009) was a veteran Irish actress, best known for her long-running role as the character Mags Kelly on the Irish soap opera Fair City, a role she had played for almost twenty years, from 18 September 1989 until her final screen appearance on 11 January 2009.

Brosnan Walsh appeared in a number of films such as The Boxer and Fatal Inheritance. She also worked as a costume designer. She first worked for ACNielsen and Aer Lingus, the latter providing her with her first experience of acting. After nearly twenty years she announced her departure from Fair City in January 2009, declaring that she had contracted motor neurone disease the previous year.

== Early life and career ==
Brosnan Walsh was born in 1938 in Greystones, County Wicklow. She had two other siblings but her mother died when she was young. An aunt raised her in Dún Laoghaire, County Dublin.

Brosnan Walsh attended the Dominican Convent on Eccles Street before pursuing a career with market researcher ACNielsen. In 1956, she moved to Aer Lingus where she first experienced acting alongside the Metro Players, an amateur group of players which included her colleagues.

Brosnan Walsh designed costumes for The Secret Marriage produced by the Irish National Opera in 1976. She acted with Mobile Theatre and Team Theatre Company throughout the 1970s and 1980s, appearing on stage in The Puppeteer from Lodz (1986), The Year of the Hiker at the Gaiety (1990) and The Mother (1997). She was a member of the Backlane Painters, with whom she exhibited and sold her work.

== Family ==
She married Willie Walsh. The couple had three daughters.

== Fair City ==
Brosnan Walsh played the character of Mags Kelly in Fair City for nearly twenty years before her January 2009 departure. Her colleague Dave Duffy, who portrays Leo Dowling, said she got a "terrific send-off" with "champagne and flowers for her and a bit of a party in McCoy's Pub".

== Health and death ==
Brosnan Walsh departed Fair City due to declining health as a result of her motor neurone disease (known as Lou Gehrig's disease or (ALS) in North America). The "hardest thing" was her loss of singing voice.

She appeared on The Late Late Show with her husband Willie Walsh, on 23 January 2009, to discuss her condition, saying she discovered it whilst on holiday with her neighbour in South France in October 2007. She was then diagnosed the following Spring.

Brosnan Walsh also spoke about her character and time in Fair City:

I loved the character of Mags, foil to Charlie's shenanigans and I particularly enjoyed her strong relationship with, for example, Dolores, Rita, Dermot and Jo. I really enjoyed playing her.

She had painted since the 1970s but her illness forced her to revert from landscape painting to abstract painting. The audience presented her with a standing ovation at the end. In February 2009, she launched Rare Diseases Week.

After Brosnan Walsh's death on 20 December 2009 at age 71, the cast of Fair City released the following tribute: "She was warm and lovely in person, a consummate professional and a delight to work with. A talented actress, singer and artist who bore her illness with incredible dignity, she will be very much missed around Carrigstown".

Jane Gogan, RTÉ's drama recruiter, said "She has been at the heart of Fair City for the last 20 years and was without doubt one of its most popular characters. She was also one of the most warmly regarded colleagues in RTÉ and will be greatly missed by the Fair City cast and crew and all who worked with her in RTÉ, as well as her host of fans throughout the country".

== Selected filmography ==
=== Film ===
Year	Title	Role	Other notes
1993	Fatal Inheritance	Mrs. O'Toole	
1997	The Boxer	Mrs. Orr	

== Awards ==
In 1969 she was a cast member of The Caucasian Chalk Circle Strand Players production and they won the Esso Trophy at the All-Ireland Drama Festival held in Athlone, County Westmeath.

In 1970 Brosnan Walsh won best actress at Templetuohy's one-act drama festival in County Tipperary.

Year	Nominee / work	Award	Result
1969	Esso Trophy	all-Ireland drama festival	Won
1970	Best Actress	Templetuohy	Won

== See also ==
- List of Fair City characters
- List of longest-serving soap opera actors#Ireland
