= Carol Meehan =

Carol Meehan may refer to:

- Carol Foley, a character from the Irish soap opera Fair City, who - while married to Billy Meehan - was known by this name
- Carol Anne Meehan (born 1956), news anchor formerly at CJOH
