= Gareth Russell =

Gareth Russell may refer to:

- Gareth Russell (musician), bass guitarist for Idlewild
- Gareth Russell (author), British author
