= Ryan Lincoln =

Ghanaian born Irish actor and rapper

- Born: Ghana
- Occupations: Actor & Rapper
- Years active: 2017-Present
- Known for: Cardboard Gangsters (2017), Kin (2021), Broken Law (2020)
- Criminal charges: Possession of a concealed weapon (2025)

Ryan Lincoln is a Ghanaian born Irish actor and rapper, living in Dublin.

== Early life & rap career ==
Lincoln was born in Ghana to an Irish/English father and Ghanaian mother, Ryan moved to Dublin with his family when he was just a year old. He spent his youth being raised in working-class North Dublin. As a young man, he became a rapper, which he credited as being what gave him the confidence to do acting later. Lincoln is also a member of the Hip-hop group 5th Element, alongside Ger Kellett.

== Acting career ==
Lincoln stated that being an actor and a rapper is both a "feast and a famine". His first one screen appearance was in the 2017 crime thriller Cardboard Gangsters as Cobbie. In 2020, Lincoln appeared in the crime thriller Broken Law. From 2021-2023 Lincoln appeared as Isaac 'Kem' Kemela in the crime series Kin.

Other on screen appearances include Michael Inside (2017), Abode (2025), Kissing Candice (2017) and Animals (2019). Lincoln stated he wanted the opportunity to play his hero Phil Lynott, in the upcoming documentary about him, but he was ultimately passed over for the role.

== Filmography ==
- 2025: Abode as Tomo
- 2021-2023: Kin as Isaac 'Kem' Kemela
- 2021: Who We Love as Taylor
- 2020: Rig 45 as Tom
- 2020: Class A as Owen
- 2020: Broken Law as Pete
- 2019: Animals as Bar Man
- 2018: RTE Storyland as Pajo
- 2018: Finding Joy as Epic Festival Brian
- 2017: The Legend of Harry & Ambrose as Seamus McPaddyman
- 2017: Kissing Candice as Jacob
- 2017: Michael Inside as Ray Flood
- 2017: Cardboard Gangsters as Cobbie
