= Anthony Delaney =

Irish historian and actor (born 1983)

- Born: 23 September 1983 (age 43)
- Education: Royal Central School of Speech and Drama; University of Exeter
- Spouse: Shane Delaney (m. 2013)

Anthony Delaney (born 23 September 1983) is an Irish historian and actor. As an actor, he is known for his roles in the RTÉ One soap opera Fair City (2015–2019) and the Acorn TV series Harry Wild (2022–). He co-hosts the History Hit podcast After Dark: Myths, Misdeeds & the Paranormal (2023–) with Madeleine Pelling. His debut book Queer Georgians was published in 2025.

== Early life and education ==
Delaney grew up in rural County Kilkenny. He trained in acting at London's Royal Central School of Speech and Drama, graduating in 2010. In 2022, Delaney completed a PhD in History at the University of Exeter.

== Career ==
=== Acting ===
Delaney began his acting career in theatre; he starred in Colin Teevan's The Kingdom at the Soho Theatre in 2012. In 2015, Delaney joined the cast of the RTÉ One soap opera Fair City as Shane Cawley, a role he would play until 2019. He made his feature film debut in the 2019 Hellboy reboot. In 2022, he began playing in the Acorn TV detective series Harry Wild.

=== History ===
Upon completing his PhD, Delaney became an Honorary Fellow at his alma mater the University of Exeter.

In October 2023, History Hit launched the podcast After Dark, which Delaney co-hosts with English historian Madeleine Pelling. Delaney and Pelling were jointly nominated for Best New Presenter at the 2024 Audio and Radio Industry Awards (ARIAs), while After Dark won Rookie of the Year at the 2024 True Crime Awards and was shortlisted for the Listeners' Choice Award at the 2025 British Podcast Awards.

Announced in 2023, Doubleday acquired the rights to publish Delaney's debut book Queer Georgians in 2025. It also had a North America release under the title Queer Enlightenments via Grove Atlantic. The book is based on Delaney's PhD.

== Personal life ==
Delaney lives in southeast London with his husband.

== Bibliography ==
- Queer Georgians: Hidden History of Lovers, Lawbreakers and Homemakers (2025) (also released as Queer Enlightenments)

== Filmography ==
Year	Title	Role	Notes
2015–2019	Fair City	Shane Cawley	77 episodes
2015	Penny Dreadful	Opera Man	Episode: "Above the Vaulted Sky"
2019	Hellboy	Alice's father	
2022–present	Harry Wild	Jordan McDonald	Recurring role

== Stage ==
Year	Title	Role	Notes
2010	Assassins	Ensemble	Union Theatre, London
2010	All-Male Iolanthe	Ensemble	Union Theatre, London
2011	Northern Star		Finborough Theatre, London
2011	Drama at Inish	Michael	Finborough Theatre, London
2012	The Kingdom	Young Man	Soho Theatre, London
2013	Liolà	Villager	National Theatre, London
2014	How Many Miles to Babylon?	Alec	Lyric Theatre, Belfast
2015	The 24 Hour Plays		Abbey Theatre, Dublin
