= Sinéad Keenan =

Irish actress (born 1977)

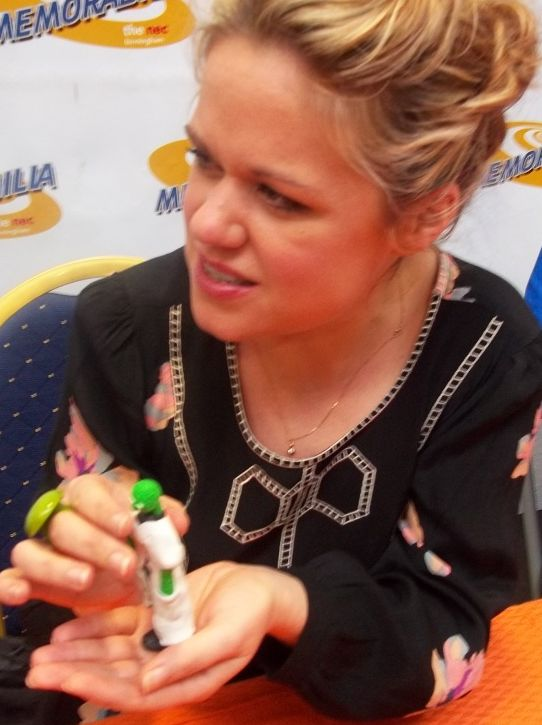
- Keenan holding an action figure of her Doctor Who character at the Birmingham Memorabilia Convention in 2012
- Born: 27 December 1977 (age 48); Dublin, Ireland
- Education: University College Dublin
- Occupation: Actress
- Years active: 1999–present
- Spouse: Chris McGill (m. 2012)
- Children: 2

Sinéad Keenan (born 27 December 1977) is an Irish actress with a wide range of television, film, and stage credits. Keenan is best known for playing Farrah Phelan in Fair City and for playing the role of a werewolf called Nina Pickering on BBC Three's supernatural drama Being Human. She has played DCI Jessica James in ITV1 drama Unforgotten since 2023.

== Early life and education ==
Sinéad Keenan was born on 27 December 1977 and raised in Dublin, the eldest of three children. Her younger brother and sister, Rory and Gráinne, are also actors.

She attended University College Dublin, graduating with a degree in sociology and history. As a child, Keenan wanted to be a lawyer because she loved the US legal drama Matlock, but as she got older she realised that she actually just wanted to play the part of the lawyer, not be one.

== Career ==
=== Film ===
Keenan's first role was in 1999, when she was cast as the teenage girlfriend of Cillian Murphy in the film, Sunburn.

=== Theatre ===
Throughout her career, Keenan has had strong roots in theatre becoming a member of the Royal Shakespeare Company (RSC). She played Hermia in A Midsummer Night's Dream at the Novello Theatre in 2006. The play was directed by Gregory Doran. She played Evie in the original play, The American Pilot in 2005, and starred in The Comedy of Errors also in 2005.

=== Radio ===
In 2011, Keenan starred alongside Jason Done as DCI Lise Lazard in Crimes Of Mancunia set in Manchester. It was written by Michael Symmons Roberts, directed by Susan Roberts and produced by Charlotte Riches.

In 2014 she appeared as Aoife in the radio play Doctor Who: Iterations of I, made by Big Finish Productions. It was written by John Dorney and directed by Ken Bentley.

In 2025, Keenan starred as Maria Kossecka in Hat Trick Productions series Discretion, broadcast as part of BBC Radio 4's broadcast and podcast series Limelight. It was written by Chris Brandon, produced by Claire Broughton, with executive production by Jed Mercurio.

=== Television ===
After appearing in Sunburn, she played the character Farrah Phelan in Irish soap opera Fair City for a year. Keenan has stated she would return to Fair City, as another character.

Keenan left Fair City amid fears of becoming typecast, and moved on to film the movie On the Nose with Cracker actor Robbie Coltrane. Her next television role was as Lisa Cassidy in short-lived Irish sitcom The Cassidys.

Keenan then went on to have guest roles in Murder City, Taggart and Doctors, along with starring in movies Conspiracy of Silence and Trouble with Sex, before landing the role of Kelly Hawkins in ITV's Moving Wallpaper, which ran for two series.

Following this, Keenan played Nina Pickering in Toby Whithouse's Being Human.

Following her success in Being Human, Keenan has had guest roles in Victoria Wood's Mid Life Christmas, Agatha Christie's Poirot, Silent Witness, and David Tennant's final episodes of Doctor Who.

In March 2018, Keenan won the Royal Television Society Programme Award for Actor (Female) for her role as Melanie Jones in Little Boy Blue. In April 2018, it was announced that she had been nominated for a Leading Actress BAFTA TV Award for the same role.

Keenan had a starring role in the Jimmy McGovern and Gillian Juckes drama Care, broadcast on BBC One in December 2018.

In April 2021, it was announced that Keenan would be starring in the two-part BBC One drama Three Families, which will focus on abortion in Northern Ireland. It was filmed in Northern Ireland in 2020.

Keenan appears in series 5 and 6 of ITV's crime drama Unforgotten as DCI Jessica James.

== Personal life ==
In 2012, she married film and television director Chris McGill, founder at Dusthouse Productions, with whom she has two sons.

== Filmography ==
=== Television ===
Year	Title	Role	Notes
1999	Fair City	Farrah Phelan	
2001	The Cassidys	Lisa Cassidy	
2004	Murder City	Young mother	Series 1, Episode 5
2007	Taggart	Alic Martin	Series 23, Episode 3 - Tenement
2008	Doctors	Elena	Series 10, Episode 22 - Larp
2008	Moving Wallpaper	Kelly Hawkins	
2009	Comedy Showcase	Wendy	Series 2, Episode 4 - The Amazing Dermot
2009	Agatha Christie's Poirot	Nora Brent	Series 12, Episode 1 - "The Clocks"
2009	Victoria Wood's Mid Life Christmas	Delia Smith's secretary	
2009–2010	Doctor Who	Addams	"The End of Time"
2009–2011	Being Human	Nina Pickering	Series One, Episodes 2–6, Series Two, Episodes 1–4, 7, 8. Series Three, Episodes 1–8
2010	Victoria Wood's Little Cracker	Mrs Whitefield	Short for Sky1
2011	Silent Witness	Naomi Silverlake	Series 14, Episode 1–2 - A Guilty Mind
2012	Lip Service	Nora	Series 2
2013	London Irish	Bronagh	Channel 4
2013	The Five(ish) Doctors Reboot	Doctor Who fan	BBC Red Button
2015	Uncle	Maggie	Series 2, Episode 5 - A Guilty Mind
2017	Little Boy Blue	Melanie Jones	
2018	Care	Claire	90-minute drama by Jimmy McGovern and Gillian Juckes
2019	Porters	Dr. Bartholomew	Series 2, 5 episodes
2019	Deep Water	Roz	ITV
2020	My Left Nut	Patricia Campbell	BBC
2021	Three Families	Theresa Ryan	Two-part drama for BBC One
2021	Showtrial	Detective Inspector Paula Cassidy	Five-part drama for BBC One
2022	Derry Girls	Aideen	Series 3, episode 3
2023–present	Unforgotten	Detective Chief Inspector Jessica James	Series 5. Six-part crime drama for ITV
2026	How to Get to Heaven from Belfast	Robyn	8 episodes

==== Personal appearances ====
Year	Title	Role	Notes
2009	Doctor Who Confidential	Herself	Lords and Masters, Allons-y!
2011	Alan Carr: Chatty Man	Herself	Series 5, Episode 7

=== Film ===
Year	Title	Role	Notes
1999	Sunburn	Margaret	Keenan's first role
2001	On the Nose	Sinead Delaney	
2003	Conspiracy of Silence	Majella	
2004	Mind of the Crime	Carrie	TV movie
2006	Trouble with Sex	Kathy	

=== Radio and CD audio drama ===
Year	Title	Role	Radio station / production company
2011	Crimes Of Mancunia	DCI Lise Lazard	BBC Radio 4
2014	Doctor Who: Iterations of I	Aoife	Big Finish Productions
2025	Discretion	Maria Kossecka	Hat Trick Productions for BBC Radio 4

=== Theatre ===
Year	Title	Role	Theatre / notes
2003	Loyal Women	Adele	Royal Court Theatre
2005	The American Pilot	Evie	The Other Place
2005	Comedy of Errors	Luciana	Royal Shakespeare Theatre
2006	A Midsummer Night's Dream	Hermia	Novello Theatre

== Awards and nominations ==
Year	Organisation	Award	Work	Result	Ref.
2018	Royal Television Society Programme Awards	Actor (Female)	Little Boy Blue	Won	
2018	BAFTA TV Awards	Best Actress	Little Boy Blue	Nominated	
