= Baz Black =

Irish actor and film director

- Born: Drogheda, County Louth, Ireland
- Education: Gaiety School of Acting
- Occupations: Actor and Film Director
- Years active: 2015-Present
- Known for: Dublin Crust, Kin, Into the Badlands

Baz Black is an Irish actor and film director, from Drogheda, County Louth, Ireland. He is best known for his fully tattooed appearance and for his appearances in Kin and Into the Badlands.

== Early life and education ==
Black was born in Drogheda, County Louth, Ireland. He studied acting at the Gaiety School of Acting in Dublin.

== Career ==
Black has been acting since 2015, first appearing in Irish Pictorial Weekly. He has had appearances in Into the Badlands, Brassic, Dublin Murders, Kin, The Nan Movie, Swing Bout, and Suit Hung. Tied Tongue. In 2023, he directed the feature film Dublin Crust, which he made independently. In 2016, Black released his first novel ‘Ink Princess’.

== Filmography ==
=== Actor ===
- 2015: Irish Pictorial Weekly as Prisoner
- 2017: Salon Confidential as Client
- 2018: Lasse-Majas detektivbyrå – Det första mysteriet as Mekaniker
- 2018: Into the Badlands as Ringmaster
- 2018: Cecelia Ahern: Dich zu lieben as Stranger
- 2019: Dublin Murders as Tattoo Artist (uncredited)
- 2020: Cold Storage as Suspect
- 2020: Reflection as Paul
- 2020: The Expanding Mind as Officer Corman
- 2021: Isolation the Series as Phone Call Friend
- 2021: Serial Daters as Jeffrey
- 2021: The Hero as Vince
- 2022: The Nan Movie as Tattoo Shop Owner (uncredited)
- 2022: Good to Talk as Mike
- 2022: The Northside Shtory as Da
- 2023: The Irish Mob as Griff
- 2021-2023: Kin as Ged Delaney
- 2023: Dublin Crust as Bonehead
- 2024: Swing Bout as Flann
- 2024: An Irish Angel as Padraig
- 2024: Suit Hung. Tied Tongue. as Dean Stapleton
- 2024: Brassic as Chalky
- 2024: A Hell of a Difference as Devil/Cloaked Figure
- 2025: Fran the Man as Hector Kelly
- 2025: The Worst Film Festival Ever as Tugg Speedman
- 2026: Life on Mercury as Mad Mike
- 2026: Harry Wild as Setana

=== Writer/Director ===
- 2020: Reflection
- 2021: Merrow
- 2021: Serial Daters
- 2021: The Hero
- 2023: Dublin Crust

=== Author ===
- 2016: Ink Princess
