= Brigie de Courcy =

Irish television producer

Brigie de Courcy is an Irish television producer.

Graduating from University College Dublin (UCD) with a PhD in Drama, she began working for Raidió Teilifís Éireann (RTÉ) as an assistant script editor on the Irish soap Fair City in 2000. After a promotion to Script Editor and successful stints as Story Editor and Story Producer on Emmerdale, she transferred to the BBC. She worked as Series Story Producer on EastEnders under Kate Harwood.

This period, from 2005 to 2006, represented a return to form for the show. Criticism had been intense, with particular ire directed at "the quality of its storylines". The general recovery under Harwood, and the improvement in storylines under de Courcy, culminated in a National Television Award for most popular series, as well as EastEnders's first BAFTA nomination since 2002 and first victory since 2001. Harwood went on to become Head of Series and Serials at the BBC in October 2006, while de Courcy left shortly after for a spell in senior BBC management.

In 2008, she returned to Irish television and was appointed Executive Producer of Fair City. During her reign, the soap has received critical acclaim for its more credible, sophisticated and psychological stories. Most recently she has become Script Producer of the new animated show on RTÉ called Ballybraddan which is about hurling and was brought in to celebrate 125 years of the Gaelic Athletic Association (GAA).
