= Barry O'Hanlon =

- Fair City character
- Portrayed by: Pat Nolan
- Duration: 1989–2011, 2019–2020
- First appearance: 18 September 1989
- Last appearance: 30 January 2020
- Introduced by: Margaret Gleeson
In-universe information
- Occupation: Journalist; Teacher; Barman
- Mother: Mary O'Hanlon
- Wife: Linda O'Malley (m. 1992)
- Daughters: Alice

Barry O'Hanlon is a fictional character in the Irish soap opera Fair City, portrayed by Pat Nolan. One of the show's original characters, Barry first appears in 1989. Barry is usually a nice guy but a little bit downtrodden. He has been summarised as "the unlucky in love ex-teacher who now runs the local paper and used to be involved with Niamh before Paul swept her off her feet (that's only the half of it)".

== Backstory ==
Barry first appears as a member of the O'Hanlon family. He is a son of Mary. In his younger years Barry studied for the priesthood, but later decided to become a schoolteacher against the wishes of his domineering mother.

== Storylines ==
=== Linda O'Malley ===
In 1991 Barry began dating Linda O'Malley, who became pregnant, and they got married in 1992, even though he knew the unborn child wasn't his. Sadly, baby Alice died a year after birth and it soon emerged that Bela Doyle was the biological father. The marriage did not last.

=== Niamh Cassidy ===
Barry recovers over time by throwing himself into his job. In 1996 he finds himself falsely accused when schoolgirl Niamh Cassidy, a student in his class seduces him and they have a passionate clinch. Niamh then lies that Barry was the one who seduced her and he nearly loses his job, but she eventually tells the truth.

In 2000 Barry finds himself attracted to Niamh for real when he starts to get to know her better after helping her to move on from her breakup with Leo Dowling. They begin a relationship and become engaged, but as the wedding day approaches, Niamh starts to have second thoughts and she realises she has feelings for Paul Brennan, who is O'Hanlon's best friend. She calls off the wedding, but decides to stay in a relationship with him. However, later she breaks up with him in public and starts seeing Paul.

When Barry finds out, he is left a broken man and spends Christmas at home drinking and feeling depressed. Niamh and Paul are shocked to see him like this and confront him. After that O'Hanlon decides to get on with his life, so he returns to his job and soon becomes a dedicated principal.

=== Sorcha Byrne ===
In 2004 O'Hanlon meets Sorcha Byrne and begins a relationship with her. Little did he know Sorcha has an affair with Ross O'Rourke, a 19-year-old Leaving Cert repeat student. Although O'Hanlon tries to reconcile with her, when the other teachers find about the affair, it is too much for O'Hanlon and he once again is overcome by depression. However, this time he loses his job and ends up needing to seek psychiatric help.

=== Journalism ===
O'Hanlon, having suffered a mental breakdown, spends months in a psychiatric ward. While there, he encounters Annette Daly, an old lover of his who is a local solicitor. He slowly recovers from his illness and is discharged along with Annette from hospital in 2005. Although both of them are psychologically fragile, they begin a relationship which is contrary to medical advice.

Annette offers the now unemployed O'Hanlon work as a secretary at her legal practise. However, his lack of legal expertise proves to be a source of annoyance for the other solicitors working with Annette. Under their pressure, O'Hanlon has to leave his job there. However, he quickly finds a position as an investigative journalist.

In 2007 when Barry publishes an article on a rape in a local newspaper, Dominic Kavanagh informs him that his daughter is the girl who has been raped. At this time, Detective Byrne begins giving Barry information. He applies for the position of editor and is given the job. O'Hanlon interviews Dermot Fahey about the recent attacks. When the identity of the rapist is revealed to be Tibbs, Detective Byrne tells Barry about this. He questions Kavanagh about assaulting Tibbs, who shrugs it off. Byrne explains that Tibbs was linked with the previous assaults, but he is certain that a vigilante is still on the loose. Barry is planning on investigating this matter further, but Ken Fahey convinces him not to.

In 2008, Barry becomes employed at The Northside Post, a local newspaper owned by Seamus McAleer. Little does he know that he is being used to sabotage the project going on in the school of which he used to be principal. He also proposes to Annette and she accepts. At Christmas, he breaks off the engagement when he finds out she had a fling with Seamus. Driving out of church while arguing with a drunken Annette, Barry in a fit of rage, takes his eye off the road and accidentally knocks down couple Ray O'Connell and Gina Cassidy (Niamh's mother) who were just arriving in the church to get married, killing Gina.

In 2009, Barry is devastated when Annette dies in a fire caused by her new partner Bill Taylor.

When The Northside Post is sold, Barry becomes a barman.

=== Cleo Collins ===
When pupil Cleo Collins is bullied at school, she decides to leave. Her foster mother Dolores Molloy speaks to O'Hanlon about this and he convinces her to return to school. Cleo later thanks Barry for helping her to become a chef. She makes a special dinner for her mother, for her boyfriend Pierce, and for Barry.

=== Criminal suspect/convict ===
Barry is wrongfully accused of paedophilia.

In 2011, Barry becomes involved in a murder storyline. He accidentally kills his friend Sarah O'Leary and – witnessed by resident thug Denzo Bishop – the pair contrive a plan to hide her body. He is eventually caught and jailed for manslaughter, thus departing Carrigstown. However, he is not killed off, leaving the door open for a return. In September 2019, it was announced that Barry would be returning to the soap after 8 years away. His return will coincide with the show's 30th anniversary.

== Reception ==
Nolan won a Golden Rose Award in the "Best Soap Actor" category at the international Rose d'Or Festival in Switzerland in May 2005.

Nolan's portrayal of Barry has earned the admiration of elderly ladies.
