= Finbar's Class =

Irish television series

- Written by: Michael Sheridan; Jennifer O'Hara
- Starring: Michael Sheridan; Fiona Glascott; Hilda Fay; Jenny Maher; Paul Walker; Brian McFadden; Aisling O'Neill; Andrea Edmunds; Glenn Mulhern; Barry McGovern
- No. of series: 2

Production
- Producer: Roy Heayberd

Original release
- Network: RTÉ TWO
- Release: 6 October 1995 – 20 December 1996

Finbar's Class is an Irish television teen drama with music video style interludes, that was broadcast for two seasons on RTÉ Two in 1995 and 1996. The series featured Michael Sheridan as Finbar Bar, a young teacher in an Irish secondary school and a host of young actors such as Fiona Glascott, Hilda Fay, Jenny Maher, Paul Walker, Brian McFadden, Aisling O'Neill, Andrea Edmunds, Amelia Crowley, Danny O'Donoghue, Glenn Mulhern, Amy-Joyce Hastings and veteran actor Barry McGovern as the headmaster. The show became a cult hit, with stars featuring in pantomimes.

Former Blue Peter presenter Caron Keating made a guest appearance in season 2.

== Reception ==
Eddie Holt of The Irish Times described the series as an "amazing form of television, more choreographed than coherent, a strange conjunction of Fame and Brookside", while a 2007 compilation by John Boland of bad RTÉ dramas in the same paper described it as "twaddle".

The series received recognition in the form of the Special Trophy in the Children and Adolescents Drama section of the Golden Chest International Television Festival.
