= Suzanne Halpin =

- Fair City character
- Portrayed by: Sarah Flood
- Duration: 1989–2013, 2024
- First appearance: Episode 1; 18 September 1989
- Last appearance: 2024
- Introduced by: Margaret Gleeson
In-universe information
- Occupation: Restaurateur
- Father: Bela Doyle
- Mother: Rita Doyle
- Brothers: Jimmy Doyle; Darren Doyle
- Sisters: Yvonne Gleeson; Helen Doyle; Louise Doyle
- Husband: Damien Halpin (m. 2008)
- Daughters: Hannah Doyle
- Grandmothers: Hannah Finnegan
- Uncles: Vincent Finnegan
- Aunts: Doreen Finnegan
- Nephews: Stephen Doyle
- Nieces: Rachel Brennan; Ruth Brennan

Suzanne Halpin (also Doyle) is a fictional character in the Irish soap opera Fair City. The character is portrayed by Sarah Flood. She was first seen on-screen during the opening episode in 1989.

== Storylines ==
Suzanne first appears as a child (Sarah Flood, her portrayer, was eight at the time). She is a member of the Doyle family, a daughter of Bela (Jim Bartley) and Rita. Suzanne later has a few relationships in Carrigstown. She has one with Floyd Phelan but leaves him after he treats her badly.

She then has a relationship with Damien Halpin. They break up when they feel their relationship is going nowhere. In 1998 Suzanne is heartbroken when her sister, Helen, dies. In 2000 she is overjoyed when her parents get back together at Christmas.

In 2001 Suzanne has a relationship with her college lecturer, Fiachra. However, she is disappointed when she finds out he is married and has also slept with her best friend, Sarah O'Leary.

In 2002 Suzanne helps her father, Bela, cope with prostate cancer. The following year, Suzanne leaves college and decides to take a year out of Ireland. She goes to Indonesia to try to find herself and protect animals in the rainforest there.

In 2005 Suzanne returns and is quick to resume her friendships with Sarah and Damien. She also starts a relationship with Morgan. However she is horrified when she learns that he is behind the brutal and savage murder of Gabriel Udenze. She quickly dumps him and Morgan is jailed. In 2007, Suzanne is told that Morgan wants to see her. She reluctantly visits him in prison where he tells her that he loves her and wants her to wait until he has served his time and continue their relationship. Suzanne is horrified and turns him down. The next day, she learns that Morgan has committed suicide after she leaves. Suzanne feels very guilty.

Later in the year, she starts to have feelings for her ex-boyfriend Damien. However, she fears that if she acts on her feelings, it might ruin their friendship. Also, she cannot tell him how she feels as Damien is in a strong relationship with a teacher of his brother Mark. Suzanne finds out that she is having an affair with another man and is unsure whether she should tell Damien. Mark eventually finds out and Damian dumps her.

Suzanne and Damien finally get together and get engaged straight away. Suzanne's parents are uncomfortable with how fast the relationship is going but are happy for her. She marries Damien in January 2008. At the reception, she is devastated to see her mother, Rita, is after having a stroke.

Herself and Damien postpone their honeymoon and spend days by her bedside. Rita is in hospital for a few months before being sent to a nursing home. Suzanne is upset when she learns that her mother may never recover.

It also causes a lot of problems in her marriage to Damien. She bickers with him a lot and is furious at him when he suggests they get away and go on their honeymoon. Bela convinces her to make up with him and go on her honeymoon. She does.

In 2010, Damien's infidelity causes their marriage to begin to fall apart. Suzanne becomes very domineering towards Damien, cultivating in her taking her frustration out on him violently.

Pregnant in 2012 with the child of David Osbourne (with whom she becomes involved after her relationship with Damien fails), Suzanne decides to take a year out of Ireland and goes to Australia to try to find herself again.

In 2013, Sarah departs Carrigstown.

== Reception ==
Suzanne's abuse of her husband Damien is considered "one of the plots on the show that had everyone talking". It was reported to have "gripped Fair City fans for months".

It led to a marked increase in calls from men in similar situations dealing their own Suzannes, and coverage in national media – such as The Irish Times — of domestic abuse perpetrated against men.

== In popular culture ==
The character of Suzanne is referred to in the musical version of Once.
