= Dublin Crust =

Independent comedy film

- Official release poster for Dublin Crust
- Directed by: Baz Black
- Written by: Baz Black
- Produced by: Emma Ray; Baz Black; Mike Timms
- Starring: Baz Black; Rob McCarthy; Donna O’Sullivan; Rosemary Henderson; Joe Rooney
- Production company: Sure Look Productions
- Release date: 23 September 2023
- Running time: 100 minutes
- Country: Ireland
- Language: English
- Budget: €35,000

Dublin Crust is a 2023 Irish comedy-drama film written and directed by Baz Black and produced by Sure Look Productions. It stars Baz Black, Paul Fitzgerald, Joe Rooney, Rosemary Henderson, and Cork native Donna O’Sullivan in her film debut.

== Premise ==
One decade after the Irish punk band Crust split up, the band members' lives have fallen apart. When Bonehead, the band's former drummer, is released from prison, he sets out to reunite the band for one last show.

== Cast ==
- Baz Black as Bonehead
- Louise McCann as Tania
- Joe Rooney as Terrence
- Rob McCarthy as Gerry
- Barry John Kinsella as Jimmy
- William Morgan as Jeremy
- Aidan O’Sullivan as Priest
- Shane Robinson as Frank
- Leanne Bickerdike as Tracey
- Adam Murphy as Cillian
- Pauline O'Driscoll as Principal O’Hara
- Gerry Cannon as Ian
- Amy Sanfey as Anna
- Oisin De Lange as Phil
- Donna O’Sullivan as Jacinta
- Rosemary Henderson as Daisy
- Colleen Keogh as Lizzy
- Mark de Carreau as Tommy
- Mike Timms as Judge Francis Shaw
- Johnny French as Barista
- Paul Fitzgerald as Mikey

== Production ==
Louth filmmaker Baz Black began writing the screenplay for Dublin Crust in 2021. In September, he shot a proof-of-concept teaser trailer which won a Screenplay Award at the Dublin International Film Festival. Despite the positive initial reception and further pitches to production companies, Black was unable to secure funding for the project. He went on to produce the film himself, on a budget of €35,000. Black later stated that the production costs would have reached €250,000 without the extensive assistance and discounted services he received, remarking that he had to "call in every favour" and “beg, borrow and steal” to complete the film. Baz noted that these challenges are common for Irish filmmakers when pitching projects, particularly when “there are no leprechauns, banshees or flame-haired Colleens in their scripts”.

Dublin Crust was shot in 15 days in 32 different locations across 3 Irish counties. During post-production, editor Emma Ray reduced the length of the film by 17 minutes.

== Release ==
The film premiered at Omniplex Cinemas in Drogheda, Ireland on 1 September, 2023. It received a full theatrical release in cinemas across Ireland on 23 September, in what Baz called “a dream come true”. While the film was originally supposed to only play in theatres for two weeks, strong audience attendance and positive critical reviews saw the film's cinema run increase to six weeks.

Dublin Crust was played at several high-profile film festivals across Ireland and the United Kingdom, and received seven awards at the Dublin International Comedy Film Festival. Baz Black won the award for Best Overall Film at the Swindon Independent Film Festival.

In 2025, Irish public media broadcaster RTÉ Player acquired the streaming rights to the film.

Baz Black expressed his hopes that the film would receive a nomination for the Irish Film & Television Academy awards after it was announced Dublin Crust was in consideration for five award categories.

== Reception ==
The film received generally positive reviews from critics, with Film Ireland calling it a "fitting tribute to The Commitments." Rose Barrett of the Dublin Gazette called the film a "crackin new Irish feature" and compared it to multiple critically-praised British comedies, including The Commitments, Trainspotting and The Full Monty. Alan Ng of Film Threat said the film "oozes that indie filmmaking spirit" and had "a great deal of heart", praising the storytelling and soundtrack.

== Awards ==
Festival	Year	Category	Result
Underground Cinema Awards, Ireland	2023	Best Independent Feature	Won
Underground Cinema Awards, Ireland	2023	Best Feature	Won
Swindon Independent Film Festival	2023	Best Feature	Won
Dublin International Comedy Film Festival	2023	Multiple categories	Multiple wins
Bucharest Best Comedy Film Festival	2023	Best Film	Nominated
Lit Laughs International Comedy Festival	2025	Best Producer	Won
Lit Laughs International Comedy Festival	2025	Best Actor Ensemble	Won
Lit Laughs International Comedy Festival	2025	Best Feature Film	Nominated
Louth International Film Festival	2023	Best Feature, Fiction	Nominated
Louth International Film Festival	2023	Best In Louth	Nominated
Underground Cinema International Film Festival	2023	Best Independent Feature Film	Won
