= Swing Bout =

2024 film by Maurice O'Carroll

- Film poster
- Directed by: Maurice O'Carroll
- Written by: Maurice O'Carroll
- Produced by: Sinead O'Riordan
- Starring: Ciara Berkeley, Sinead O’Riordan, Ben Condron, Chrissie Cronin, Frank Prendergast, John Connors, Johnny Elliot, Baz Black, Megan Haly, Niamh Cremin, Gerard Kearney, Eddie Jackson, Ruth Hayes, William Morgan
- Cinematography: Mark O'Rouke
- Edited by: Maurice O'Carroll
- Music by: Bryan Pepper
- Production company: Orion Productions
- Distributed by: Indie Rights
- Release dates: February 2024 (Dublin International Film Festival); 12 May 2025
- Running time: 90 minutes
- Country: Ireland
- Language: English

Swing Bout is a 2024 independent, Irish crime fiction, sport film written and directed by Maurice O'Carroll and starring Ciara Berkeley, Sinead O'Riordan, Ben Condron, Chrissie Cronin, Frank Prendergast, John Connors, Johnny Elliot, Baz Black, Megan Haly, Niamh Cremin, Gerard Kearney, Eddie Jackson, Ruth Hayes, and William Morgan. Sinead O'Riordan also produced the film.

== Plot ==
Swing Bout follows the story of a young boxer who is plunged into a tumultuous journey from the dressing room to her ring walk in a night of deceit, betrayal, and life-altering decisions at a major boxing event.

== Production ==
The film was shot in County Cork over 21 days on a small budget. During filming, actress/producer Sinead O'Riordan took a real punch to the face when she accidentally called for the wrong shot.

== Release ==
The film premiered at the Dublin International Film Festival in 2024 and was released in select cinemas in Ireland in 2025. ORion Productions release the film on digital in Ireland and the UK. In 2026, Indie Rights distributed the film worldwide. In 2026, the film was broadcast on RTÉ2.

== Reception ==
The Guardian gave the film a 3/5 calling it a "gutsy winner" and praising the visuals and clever use of small budget.

Irish Examiner gave the film a 4/5 saying "Maurice O'Carroll's direction delivers a clear-eyed and unsentimental account of one woman's bitter experience of the sweet science, while Mark O'Rouke's camerawork in the sweaty, claustrophobic confines of the dressing-room floats like a butterfly and stings like a bee".

Film Threat praised Ciara Berkeley's performance and said the film was "another independent movie that proves that filmmakers do not need boatloads of money in order to make an amazing film".

The film has an 82% rating on Rotten Tomatoes, based on 11 critic reviews.

== Cast ==
- Ciara Berkeley as Tony
- Chrissie Cronin as Vickie
- Sinead O'Riordan as Emma
- Ben Condron as Jack
- Frank Prendergast as Micko
- Johnny Elliott as Bomber
- Megan Haly as Mary Malicious
- Niamh Cremin as Bernie Breen
- Gerard Kearney as Gary Rohan
- Baz Black as Flann
- John Connors as The Guru
