= Irish Pictorial Weekly =

- Genre: Satire
- Written by: Kevin Gildea
- Starring: Kevin Gildea
- Country of origin: Ireland
- Original language: English
- No. of seasons: 3
- No. of episodes: 18

Production
- Production locations: RTÉ Television Centre, Donnybrook, Dublin 4, Ireland
- Camera setup: Multi-camera
- Running time: 30 minutes
- Production company: Raidió Teilifís Éireann

Original release
- Network: RTÉ One
- Release: 29 November 2012 – present

Irish Pictorial Weekly is an Irish satirical television series which was broadcast on Raidió Teilifís Éireann starting in November 2012. Series 2 of the show started on 21 November 2013 and was renewed for a third season which began airing on 22 March 2015. On March 30, 2016, the show returned for a one-off special, "focussing on the 1916 centenary celebrations and... on what Ireland has done with its independence in the last 100 years" since the 1916 Easter Rising.

The show features satirical sketches on current news stories and popular culture, as well as parody songs, comedy sketches, re-edited videos, cartoons and spoof television formats. Comedians who have performed on the show include Barry Murphy, Gary Cooke, Paul Howard, John Colleary, Paul Woodful, Colum McDonnell, Alan Shortt, Eleanor Tiernan, Tara Flynn, Baz Black and Abie Philbin Bowman.
