= Care (2018 film) =

2018 TV film

- Written by: Gillian Juckes, Jimmy McGovern
- Directed by: David Blair
- Starring: Sinéad Keenan, Sheridan Smith, Alison Steadman
- Country of origin: United Kingdom
- Original language: English

Production
- Running time: 89 minutes

Original release
- Network: BBC
- Release: 2018

Care is a 2018 TV film starring Sinéad Keenan, Sheridan Smith and Alison Steadman.

It was written by Gillian Juckes and Jimmy McGovern.
