= Suit Hung. Tied Tongue. =

2023 Irish film

- Film Poster
- Directed by: Sau Dachi
- Written by: Sau Dachi
- Screenplay by: Sau Dachi
- Produced by: Sau Dachi Michael Earley Jane L. Tobin
- Cinematography: Alan Dunne
- Edited by: Luke De Brùn
- Music by: Dario Rodighiero
- Production company: Standard Practice Productions
- Distributed by: RTÉ, RTÉ Player, Eiretainment.com to date
- Release dates: RTÉ 1 6th November 2026, 10 September 2023 (Underground Cinema International Film Festival); 2 May 2024
- Running time: 94 Minutes
- Country: Ireland
- Language: English

Suit Hung. Tied Tongue. is a 2023 Irish independent thriller film, directed by Sau Dachi and starring Paul St Leger, Alex Eydt, William Morgan, George Bracebridge, Helena McInerny and Gerry Cannon. The film became controversial for its premise about killing an Irish government minister.

== Plot ==
Suit Hung. Tied Tongue centres around two brothers, Sean (Paul St Leger) and Freddie (Alex Eydt) Halpin who, in their grief and anger, decide to take radically violent action against the government.

== Production ==
Filming began in 2023 in Finglas and County Wicklow. The film was made on a small budget.

== Release ==
An official trailer for the film was released on 24 January 2024. The film received a streaming release on 2 May 2024, on Eiretainment. The film was selected for the Richard Harris International Film Festival.

== Awards ==
The film won "best independent film" at the Underground Cinema International Film Festival in 2023. As well as garnering favourable reviews in The Guardian,, RTÉ.ie, Joe.ie, Film Ireland, The Sunday Times, Cork Beo.

== Cast ==
- Paul St Leger as Sean Halpin
- Alex Eydt as Freddie Halpin
- William Morgan as Minister Paul Keogh
- George Bracebridge as Chief Detective Morris
- Helena McInerny as Dr. Denise Irwin
- Gerry Cannon as Taoiseach Brendan Quinn
- Rosey Hayes as Emma O’Connor
- Freda King as Phyllis
- Dean Houlihan as Guard First Responder
- Baz Black as Dean Stapleton
- Sadhbh Larkin Coyle as Aine Farrelly
- Jemma Curran as Dispatch
- Austin Grehan as Brendan Donoghue
- Charlotte Rose Keating as Anne Haplin
- Richard Mason as David Hayes
- Sandra Hayden Mason as Mary Hayes
- Paul Murphy as Dermot Walsh
- Theresa O’Connor as Tanaiste Justine Carberry
- Aidan O’Sullivan as Fiachra O’Callaghan
- Mary Elizabeth Sheehan as Fionnuala Keogh
- Paul Sparkes as Detective Henry Gallagher
- John Sweeney as Peter Harding
- Patrick John Wall as Gerry Haplin
- Michaèl Woods as Detective Christopher Keane

== Reception ==
The Guardian gave the film a 3/5 rating, saying the film "labours somewhat for resolution and clarity in its closing stages" but stated that the film was "the kind of engaged grassroots film-making that we need more than ever".

RTÉ called the film "a cautionary tale about what can happen when people lose hope", while warning viewers that there was "no comedy or light heartedness" in the film.

UK Film Review called the film a "rather intriguing viewing that operates as a documentary and the performances and filmmaking techniques make it feel like the events were all factual".

Film Ireland Magazine called the film a "production that is delicate and driven by merit to Irish cinema". The review praised the performances by the cast.
