= Farrah Phelan =

Farrah Clayton
- Fair City character
- Portrayed by: Fiona Glascott; Sinead Keenan; Denise McCormack; Caroline Harvey
- Duration: 1998–2003, 2014–2019
- First appearance: 1998
- Last appearance: 3 January 2019
- Introduced by: Niall Mathews
In-universe information
- Occupation: Bartender (former), Shop assistant
- Parents: Christy Phelan (father; deceased); Renee Phelan (mother)
- Spouse: Max Clayton (separated)

Farrah Phelan (now Clayton) is a fictional character from the Irish television soap opera, Fair City. The character has been portrayed by four actresses in total. The character first appeared onscreen in 1998 played by Fiona Glascott; however, the character left the series to go to London. On her return in 2000, Sinead Keenan was cast in the role. The character left the series for a second time and when she returned for a third time, the role went to Denise McCormack. The character again left the series to take up a photography course in London. In 2014, Caroline Harvey was cast in the role when the character's father Christy Phelan has a stroke.

== Storylines ==
=== Backstory ===
The Phelan family have been part of Fair City since the series began in 1989. Farrah's uncle, Hughie, is the first Phelan to appear in the series. As that character leaves Carrigstown, his mother Eunice Dunstan is introduced to the series and – later – her older son Christy and his wife Renee.

As Hughie and his wife depart Carrigstown, the writers provided his brother and his sister-in-law as replacements. The Doyles – the other major family in Fair City – are growing up so it is thought the series needed a new family. This introduced teenage daughter Farrah to the series.

Farrah is the first of the two Phelan siblings to be introduced. Her brother Floyd is introduced soon after (he has also been played by two separate actors). She also has a half-sister, Heather, whom Floyd unknowingly dated.

The Phelans would later take over Doyle's shop – now Phelan's Spar.

=== Return ===
After years living in New Zealand, Farrah returns to Carrigstown along with her husband Max Clayton when her father becomes unwell.

== Development ==
The character has had several different styles over the years. Each of the actresses who have played Farrah have brought their own vision to the role. Fiona Glascott played the role as a hippyish guitar playing teen. Later, Sinead Keenan would add a more comic approach to the character. Denise McCormack played a more grounded Farrah. The actress who plays Farrah currently, Caroline Harvey, stated in an interview for the Irish Independent in 2016: "At the start I made the decision to do my own thing, and because there was a long gap between when Denise played Farrah and when I played her, it allowed me some breathing space."
