= Eleanor Tiernan =

Irish stand-up comedian, writer and actress

- Born: 1976 (age 49–50); Athlone, County Roscommon, Ireland
- Occupations: Comedian; writer; actress
- Relatives: Tommy Tiernan (cousin)

Eleanor Tiernan (born 1976) is an Irish stand-up comedian, writer, and actress.

== Background ==
Tiernan is from the County Roscommon side of Athlone. She studied engineering in University College Galway. She moved to London in 2015.

== Career ==
Tiernan came to attention as a stand-up in the UK and Ireland. As of 2019, she has performed at the Edinburgh Fringe 9 times. She was a panellist on The Panel. She performed on Stewart Lee's Alternative Comedy Experience. She wrote and performed sketches for three seasons of Irish Pictorial Weekly. Her 2007 show was called "Help". Her 2014 show was called "Help The Frigid". Her 2015 stand-up tour was entitled "National Therapy Project". In 2022 she starred in ITV / Virgin Media Ireland's Holding.

As a writer, she has written for the Irish edition of the Sunday Times, and been a regular columnist in The Irish Examiner she has contributed to Buffering. She has also written for ITV2’s comedy game show CelebAbility hosted by fellow comedian, and popular voice of Love Island, Iain Stirling and co-wrote an episode of Buffering for ITV2. She has written and performed on the critically acclaimed political satire show Irish Pictorial Weekly (RTÉ) for multiple series and frequently writes opinion pieces for the Irish Times, and has written for The i.

In 2020, Tiernan released a stand-up special Success Without a Sex Tape for BBC Radio 4, based on her 2018 Edinburgh show.

Tiernan took part in Radio 4's The News Quiz in April 2022.

She performs her standup supporting Lucy Beaumont on tour.

== Personal life ==
Inspired in part by Phillip Schofield, Tiernan came out publicly as gay in her 40's.

She is a cousin of another Irish stand-up Tommy Tiernan.

She has undergone cognitive behavioral therapy.

== Television Credits ==
- Liffey Laughs (RTÉ)
- The Panel (RTÉ)
- Irish Pictorial Weekly (RTÉ)
- Headwreckers (Channel 4)
- Holding (ITV/Virgin Media Ireland)
