= Abode (film) =

2025 Irish film directed by Liam O Mochain

- Official Film Poster
- Directed by: Liam O Mochain
- Screenplay by: Liam O Mochain
- Produced by: Liam O Mochain, Bernie Grummell, Conor Arrigan, Frank Phelan
- Starring: Liam O Mochain, Rosemary Henderson, Jed Murray, Sinead O’Riordan, Stephen Jones, Anthony Morris
- Cinematography: Joshua Burke
- Edited by: Ciara Brophy
- Release date: 7 November 2025
- Running time: 81 minutes
- Country: Ireland
- Language: English

Abode is a 2025 Irish film, written and directed by Liam O Mochain and starring Rosemary Henderson, Jed Murray, Sinead O’Riordan, Anthony Morris, Stephen Jones, Matthew O’Brien and Ryan Lincoln.

== Plot ==
Abode is 5 stories connected by the theme of home and what it means to the different characters. Whether they are living in mansions, on the street, a big city, in suburbia or the countryside, home has a different meaning for each of them.

== Cast ==
- Liam O Mochain as Benedict
- Marion O’Dwyer as Carol
- Anthony Morris as Casper
- Sophie Vavasseur as Fiona
- Ryan Lincoln as Tomo
- Mary McEvoy as Peggy
- Brendan Conroy as Red
- Rosemary Henderson as Molly
- Donncha Crowley as Frank Sr
- Lynette Callaghan as Pactricia
- Karl Argue as Frank Jr
- Gail Brady as Skyler
- Matthew O’Brien as Sam
- Jed Murray as Bill
- Mary Murray as Maria
- Stephen Jones as Conor
- Sinead O’Riordan as Sadie

== Production ==
Mochain had originally planned to make a documentary about homelessness but later decided on doing a fiction live action feature, following different stories. Originally set to follow 10 separate stories, Mochain ultimately kept the 5 he felt “spoke the loudest”. The film was shot in several different locations across Dublin from 2021-2023 With Mochain funding the whole film by himself.

== Release ==
The film Premiered at the 2025 Galway Film Fleadh and had a trailer released internationally that same year. The film was released into Irish cinemas in Novemeber, 2025. In march of 2026, the film was released into UK cinemas.

== Reception ==
The Guardian gave the film a ⅖ stars, stating it burrowed into stereotypes and that “The humour falls flat, the twists are weak, the plotlines are absurd and it’s soaked in booze and gambling”, and that “The only thing that saves the film are the actors’ performances”

Film Ireland gave a more positive review, stating “Abode is an often very funny work that effectively mines the familiarity of Irish settings, accents, and situations, resulting in a film best experienced in a sold-out Irish cinema”.

RTÉ gave the film a 3 ½ out of 5 claiming “Abode has its share of surprises and good performances throughout. There is more meat on the bones of some of the vignettes than others - and a bit too much music at times - but the pace ensures that the film as a whole doesn't outstay its welcome”.

FilmHounds Magazine gave the film a ⅖ stars, saying “Abode tries very hard to be sincere. There is a clear attempt to explore themes of home, loss, and connection with empathy. Several stories highlight social issues, including homelessness and isolation. These elements give Abode a sense of purpose. But sincerity can only take a film so far”.

The Irish Times gave a more positive review, stating that Abode was a “sincere Irish Christmas movie about home and the absence of it”.
