= Madeleine Pelling =

English art historian (born 1990s)

Madeleine Pelling FRHistS
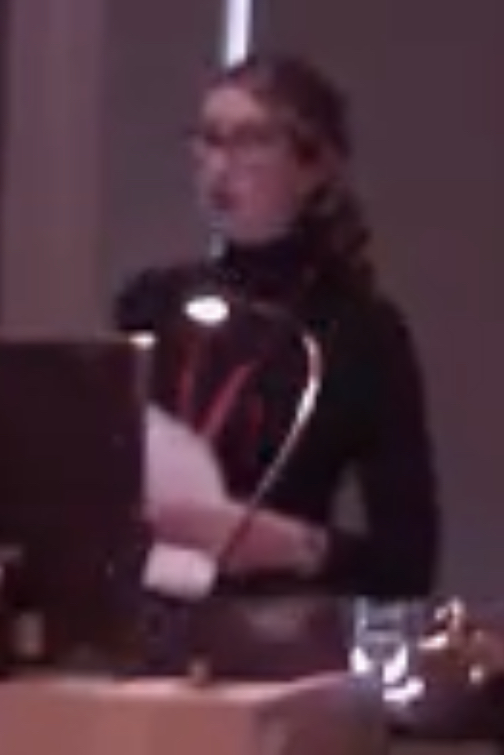
- A screenshot of Pelling giving a lecture at the Society of Antiquaries, 2019
- Born: Madeleine Lucy Pelling; 1990s
- Other name: Maddy Pelling

Academic background
- Education: University of York
- Thesis: (2018)

Academic work
- Discipline: History
- Sub-discipline: Early modern Britain
- Notable works: Writing on the Wall; Hoax
- Website: madeleinepelling.com

Madeleine Lucy Pelling FRHistS (born 1990s), also credited as Maddy Pelling, is an English cultural and art historian. As of 2023, she co-hosts the History Hit podcast After Dark: Myths, Misdeeds & the Paranormal with Anthony Delaney. She authored the books Writing on the Wall: Graffiti, Rebellion and the Making of Eighteenth-century Britain (2024) and Hoax: Truth and Lies in the Age of Enlightenment (2026).

== Early life and education ==
Pelling grew up in Leek, Staffordshire. She appears briefly in an episode of London's Burning as an infant when her father accidentally walked into an active scene with her in a pram. Pelling graduated with a Bachelor of Arts (BA) in English from the University of York in 2014. On a History of Art Department scholarship, she completed a PhD there in 2018.

== Career ==
After completing her PhD, Pelling held Postdoctoral Fellowships at institutions including the Paul Mellon Centre for Studies in British Art, the University of Birmingham's Eighteenth Century Centre, and the University of Edinburgh's Institute for Advanced Studies in the Humanities (IASH).

Through the Georgian Papers Programme, Pelling co-curated the 2019 virtual exhibition Women and History: Power, Politics and Historical Thinking in Queen Charlotte's Court with Karin Wulf. From 2021 to 2022, Pelling co-hosted podcast Travelling Sisterhood of Art Historians with fellow art historians Freya Gowrley, Serena Dyer and Caroline McCaffrey-Howarth. She also co-hosted Coffee House Perspectives with Adam J Smith for the British Society for Eighteenth-Century Studies (BSECS).

In October 2023, History Hit launched the podcast After Dark, which Pelling co-hosts with Irish historian Anthony Delaney. Pelling and Delaney were jointly nominated for Best New Presenter at the 2024 Audio and Radio Industry Awards (ARIAs), while After Dark won Rookie of the Year at the 2024 True Crime Awards and was shortlisted for the Listeners' Choice Award at the 2025 British Podcast Awards.

Pelling also featured in the Channel 4 docuseries The Queens Who Changed the World (2023) and Titanic in Colour (2024), as well as the Sky History docuseries Mayhem! Secret Lives of the Georgian Kings (2024).

Via Profile Books, Pelling's debut book Writing on the Wall: Graffiti, Rebellion and the Making of Eighteenth-century Britain was published in 2024. Alice Loxton selected Writing on the Wall for the BBC History Best History Books of 2024.

== Bibliography ==
=== Books ===
- Writing on the Wall: Graffiti, Rebellion and the Making of Eighteenth-century Britain (2024)
- Hoax: Truth and Lies in the Age of Enlightenment (2026)

=== Edited volumes ===
- The 18th Century Today: Literature and Media from Beauty and the Beast to Bridgerton (2025), co-edited with Emrys Jones

=== Select chapters ===
- "'I made memorandums': Mary Hamilton, Sociability, and Antiquarianism in the Eighteenth-Century Collection" in Women and the Art and Science of Collecting in Eighteenth-Century Europe (2020), edited by Arlene Leis and Kacie L. Wills
- "Theme Parks and Seaside Resorts: Rethinking Material and Visual Culture in Austenland (2013) and Sanditon (2019)" in The Edinburgh Companion to Jane Austen and the Arts (2024), edited by Hannah Moss and Joe Bray

=== Select articles ===
- "Collecting the World: Female Friendship and Domestic Craft at Bulstrode Park" in Journal for Eighteenth-Century Studies (2018)
- "Crafting Friendship: Mary Delany's Album of Découpage and Queen Charlotte’s Pocketbook" in Journal18 (2018)
- "Selling the Duchess: Narratives of Celebrity in A Catalogue of the Portland Museum (1786)" in Early Modern Women: An Interdisciplinary Journal (2019)
- "Reimagining Elizabeth I and Mary Queen of Scots: Women’s Antiquarianism and Domestic Identities, c. 1750 – 1800" in Women's History Review (2019)
