= Ciara O'Callaghan =

Irish actress

- Born: Dublin, Ireland
- Occupation: Actress
- Years active: 1994 –present

Ciara O'Callaghan is an Irish actress. She appeared in The Clinic and Sherlock Holmes and the Baker Street Irregulars. She is best known for her portrayal of Yvonne Gleeson on the Irish soap opera Fair City. She first came into the show in 1998 as Yvonne Doyle. She left in 2003 and returned in 2008. She also left again in 2014. She also appeared in Mrs. Brown's Boys D'Movie, Insatiable, and the RTE drama Striking Out. In 2009, she appeared in one episode of The Restaurant.

== Filmography ==
=== Film ===
Year	Title	Role	Notes
1997	Spacejacked	Monica Miles	
2008	Insatiable	Jenna	
2014	Mrs. Brown's Boys D'Movie	Irma Byke	
2017	I Kill Giants	Theresa Tuzzo	Uncredited role

=== Television ===
Year	Title	Role	Notes
2007	Imeacht na nIarlaí	Nuala Ní Dhónaill	Episode 1
2007	Sherlock Holmes and the Baker Street Irregulars		Television film
2007	The Clinic	Louise Geary	Episode #5.1
2009–2014	Fair City	Yvonne Doyle	16 episodes
2015	Mrs. Brown's Boys	Bubbles McCarthy	Episode: "Mammy's Christmas Punch"
2016	Doctors	Lucretia Moon	Episode: "Being Witched"
2017	Bridget & Eamon	Mary	Episode: "The Camogie Team"
2017, 2018	Striking Out	Julie O'Brien	2 episodes
2020	Fantasy Ireland	Bernie Jean	Episode: "Sunny Daze"

== See also ==
- List of longest-serving soap opera actors#Ireland
