= Nancy Collins =

Nancy Collins may refer to:

- Nancy Collins (?–1812), a.k.a. Nancy Clarke, Barbadian hotelier
- Nancy A. Collins (born 1959), United States horror fiction writer
- Nancy Walbridge Collins (born 1973), professor at Columbia University
- Nancy Adams Collins (born 1947), politician in Mississippi
