= Aisling O'Neill =

Irish actress

- Born: 1974 (age 51–52); Dublin, Ireland
- Occupation: Actor
- Years active: 1995–present
- Television: Fair City
- Children: 1

Aisling O'Neill is an Irish actress. She has portrayed Carol Foley in Fair City for more than three decades.

Aisling is the daughter of Irish actor Chris O' Neill who played Michael in The O' Riordains

O'Neill's portrayal of Carol earns her personal letters of admiration and bought her an IFTA nomination for Best Female Performance in a Soap or Comedy.

Originally from Dublin, O'Neill lives in Gorey, County Wexford. She is a mother of one.

== Filmography ==
Film

Year	Title	Role	Notes
2000	Accelerator	Louise	
2003	Goldfish Memory	Helen	
2006	Basic Instinct 2	Screaming Woman	
2016	Lily	Yvette	Short film
2019	Red Room	Catherine	
2021	Who We Love	Yvette	
2021	The Letters	Publicist	
TBA	Dreamtown	Mel Richards	Post-production
TBA	Tuesday Traders	Maxi	Post-production

Television

Year	Title	Role	Notes
1995	Finbar's Class	Maggot	Main role (season 1)
1998	The Ambassador	Nate's Girlfriend	Episode: "Nine Tenths of the Law"
1999–present	Fair City	Carol Foley	Regular role
2023	The Woman in the Wall	Mrs. Moran	2 episodes
