= Carol Foley =

- Fair City character
- Portrayed by: Aisling O'Neill
- Duration: 1999–present
- Introduced by: Niall Mathews
In-universe information
- Occupation: Cab company manager Mayoress of Carrigstown; Bar manager Bar owner Nightclub owner Shop assistant
- Father: Trigger Foley
- Spouse: Billy Meehan (deceased) (m. 2001) Robbie Quinn (deceased) (m. 2016)
- Sons: Lorcan Foley; Jack Gleeson
- Grandsons: Lorcan Foley Jnr
- Other relatives: Ali Foley

Carol Foley (also Meehan) is a fictional character in the Irish soap opera Fair City, portrayed by Aisling O'Neill. O'Neill originally auditioned for the role of Ava Spillane.

Carol is one of the main female characters on the show. She has featured in Fair City for more than two decades. Carol's storylines have included a number of affairs, alcoholism and child abuse.

== Backstory ==
In 1999 Carol, a recovering alcoholic, arrives in Carrigstown searching for her son Lorcan, whom she gave up for adoption years prior, as she had discovered he was in trouble for breaking into cars and going joyriding in them. She quickly reunites with him, though she doesn't get on well with his adoptive parents Kay and Malachy.

== Storylines ==
=== Billy Meehan ===
In early 2001 Carol goes back to an old flame Billy Meehan. She moves in with him and becomes engaged to him, not knowing he's become a crime lord. Billy has an affair with her best friend, prostitute Tracey McGuigan, whom he beats and abuses. When Carol becomes pregnant, Billy shows a kind side, showering her with gifts and making big plans for their future. In October 2001, Lorcan finds out the truth about Billy, but threatened by Billy, he begrudgingly decides not tell anything to Carol.

In early November 2001, Carol finds out about everything in the worst way possible when she catches Billy out with Tracey just hours after they got married. Disgusted by his and Tracy's betrayal, she realizes their relationship is a lie and she slaps him in the face. Billy hits her back and then beats her so savagely that she loses their baby which he then blames her for. Carol vows vengeance and finds an ally in Leo Dowling to get rid of Billy, who has also caused him great pain. However, she decides to continue living with Billy and remain ‘friends’ with Tracy until she can figure out a plan to get out of this nightmare with Lorcan.

In late November 2001, angered to find out that Billy has threatened his wife Pauline and forced her to flee the country because of Leo not wanting him to be a partner in his taxi firm Acorn Cabs anymore (Billy was using Leo's taxis as transport for prostitutes), Leo has a showdown with the crime boss and nearly beats him to death at his apartment before making a hasty exit. At the same time, Carol is preparing to leave Ireland with Lorcan, but a bloody Billy, smarting from Leo's onslaught, comes across her flight tickets and attacks her again. An infuriated Lorcan appears and, having had enough of his stepfather's taunts, hits Billy from behind in the back of his head with a golf club, killing him.

With Billy dead, Carol immediately goes into action, calling Leo to come to the scene of the crime. Although Leo suspects that Billy's body had been in a different position the last time he saw him, Carol tricks Leo into believing that he killed him. The pair subsequently bury Billy's body in the Dublin Mountains. Carol, Lorcan and Leo along with war veteran Paschal Malvey agree to keep Billy's death a secret. Paschal convinces Lorcan to join the Irish Army to serve his country. Carol, not wanting to be reminded of Billy's prostitution ring, plays the grieving widow to Billy's former right-hand man Mick Mahoney and convinces him to manage the day-to-day running of her pub The Galley, which was a front for prostitutes under Billy's watch. On Christmas Day, Leo's conscience gets the better of him and he finds himself at Billy's burial site. Carol is able to keep Leo under control, but months later in 2002, the Gardaí find Billy's body when a dog digs it up and a passerby notices it.

Detective Byrne and Sergeant Deegan try to solve the murder of Billy Meehan. Although Deegan suspects that Leo is behind it, Byrne senses that Carol was involved. They soon discover that Carol lied about receiving phone calls from Billy, but the innocent Leo becomes the prime suspect in the murder. Pascal refuses to allow an innocent man take the fall and arranges to meet Carol. When Carol arrives at the rendezvous point, she is shocked to discover that Pascal is sitting unconscious in a chair and the war veteran spends months in a comatose state in hospital. Leo is charged and is imprisoned.

In 2003 days before Leo's trial takes place, Leo suddenly realises that Billy's body had been moved, but by then it is too late, as Carol feigns ignorance of what really happened. Leo is wrongfully convicted for murder. Lorcan visits Pascal in hospital and decides to tell the Gardaí everything. Leo is released from prison. A second trial finds Lorcan not guilty. Carol forgives Tracey and they become good friends again.

=== Sylvester Garrigan ===
Carol begins dating Shay Houlihan in 2004, but she gets bored of him and later begins a relationship with Anthony Farrell.

When a crime boss, Sylvester Garrigan, arrives in Carrigstown in mid 2005, he takes advantage of the death of his predecessor and seizes control of the remnants of Billy Meehan's criminal empire with Mick becoming Garrigan's right-hand man in much the same way as he had served Billy before. Carol begins a friendship with the crime boss through Farrell's meetings with him as his solicitor. When Farrell sees Carol and Garrigan talking, he suspects that they are infatuated with each other. Carol, disgusted by this allegation, dumps Farrell. The crime boss reveals to Carol that he is illiterate and has an estranged daughter. Carol helps Garrigan in efforts to reconcile with his daughter, but he ends up losing her again when she learns of his criminal position.

When, in late 2005, Mick kills Alex Yuschenko, a Ukrainian gang member, on Garrigan's orders, the gang kidnap Mick's niece Ali Foley in January 2006 and threaten to kill her if he doesn't assassinate Garrigan. Lorcan, who is then married to Ali, is horrified but he is eventually persuaded to help with the assassination attempt. Carol and Garrigan are in a car when Lorcan appears on a motorbike with the shooter. As the shooter is about to pull the trigger, Lorcan realises his mother is in the car and rides off. The shooter's aim is put off and the shot instead wounds Garrigan. However, he survives the attack and orders Farrell to find those responsible.

The Ukrainians are furious that Mick goofed up but, realising that Garrigan would have all his goons on their trail, they release Ali and flee the country. After recovering in hospital, Garrigan discovers that Mick was behind the assassination attempt and forces Mick to amputate one of his own fingers as punishment for double-crossing him. Carol, in an attempt to protect her son from Garrigan's wrath, offers herself to him. Garrigan accepts and tells her that Lorcan is safe.

In mid 2006, Lorcan leaves the Irish Army and Carol lets him run her nightclub, but is later furious to discover that he's using it as a front for drug-dealing, fearing that he is going down a similar path to Billy.

In late 2006 Carol has an affair with Rory Goff, who unknown to her, is an undercover Garda who infiltrates Garrigan's gang and coaxes her into giving him information about Garrigan. Provided with this information, the Gardaí raid one of Garrigan's booze runs. They also find drugs which Lorcan is piggybacking on the booze run. Meanwhile, Lorcan discovers that Rory is passing information to the police but thinks he is a police tout and not a Garda himself. Garrigan is furious that Lorcan implicated him in drug-dealing and he orders Lorcan to kill the undercover Garda.

As the two men confront each other, Lorcan fires the first shot, but Rory strikes back with another, wounding them both in the process. When Carol arrives on the scene, she calls for an ambulance and they are taken to hospital. Rory survives his ordeal, but Lorcan's days are numbered. When Carol and Ali convince him to do the right thing, Lorcan makes a complete deathbed confession to the Gardaí before he dies in hospital. Garrigan suspects that Carol has betrayed him and decides to leave Carrigstown for the time being, but Detective Sergeant Byrne arrests him and takes him to a Garda station for questioning. Garrigan is never seen again but is assumed to be in prison.

In the aftermath of Lorcan's funeral, Ali tells Carol that she is pregnant with Lorcan's child. Carol subsequently breaks up with Rory and warns him never to speak to her again. In 2007, Ali gives birth to a baby boy and names him Lorcan Jr in memory of her deceased husband. Carol is overcome by happiness, but she is also saddened at the thought that her son will never be able to hold his baby. In 2008, Rory returns to Carrigstown and begins a relationship with Carol. Ali is furious when she finds out and she believes that Carol is betraying Lorcan.

=== Criminal Assets Bureau ===
In 2009 the Criminal Assets Bureau starts investigating Carol's illegally acquired assets. As a result, Carol loses her pub and nightclub which were purchased by Billy's ill-gotten gains.

=== Christy Phelan and Louie Gleeson ===
Carol later is involved in an unlikely relationship with Christy Phelan and the pair become engaged in 2010. However, she leaves Christy and falls for Louie Gleeson only to be left devastated when Louie has an affair with his ex Ingrid, the mother of his children. Carol starts dating Dan Keating in 2013 shortly after his arrival in Carrigstown.

=== Robbie Quinn ===
In 2014, wheeler-dealer Robbie Quinn (Karl Shiels) arrives in Carrigstown.

In 2015, Carol begins a relationship with Robbie.

Carol reveals the harrowing details of her childhood to Robbie in which she recounts how she was abused by one of her father's friends when she was 11.

In the summer of 2016, Carol marries Robbie in a double wedding along with Decco Bishop and Kerri-Ann Boyle. The wedding does not go according to plan however, as Carol's father Trigger turns up to the ceremony drunk and is determined to ruin his daughter's big day. As Carol is being driven to the wedding by Wayne Molloy, Trigger suddenly steps out in front of the car and is knocked to the ground. Wayne quickly gets out of the car and runs to help Trigger, who is scrambling to his feet, but is punched in the stomach and sent to the ground. Trigger then begins to kick Wayne and as Carol runs to Wayne's aid, he attacks her by grabbing her hair and then punches her in the face. When Carol turns up to exchange vows, Robbie is horrified to see her all bloody and bruised. Robbie later spots Trigger sitting at a table and goes over and drags him out outside. Trigger grabs a glass bottle and threatens Robbie with it but Robbie quickly gains control and delivers a bad beating to Trigger. Carol's ex, Dan - who serves as Robbie's best man - calls '999' and orders everyone back inside. During their first dance, Carol and Robbie are forced to hide what had happened as the sound of sirens from an approaching ambulance grows louder.

== Reception ==
The Irish Independent has described Carol as "undoubtedly Fair City's most iconic character".

Aisling O'Neill's portrayal of Carol earns her personal letters of admiration and bought her an IFTA nomination for Best Female Performance in a Soap or Comedy.

Carol has been likened to Peggy Mitchell, the character in British soap opera EastEnders.

== In popular culture ==
The impressionist Mario Rosenstock regularly spoofs Carol in his Gift Grub series on Today FM.
