= Ian Robertson (psychologist) =

Scottish neuroscientist and clinical psychologist (born 1951)

Ian Hamilton Robertson (born 26 April 1951) is a Scottish neuroscientist and clinical psychologist, and Professor of Psychology at Trinity College Dublin. He is also known as a leading researcher as to how an individual may harness the attention system of one's mind to enhance autonomy over emotions and cognitive function.

== Life ==
Ian Robertson is Professor of Psychology at Trinity College, Dublin and founding Director of Trinity College Institute of Neuroscience. Robertson is the first psychologist in Ireland to have been elected a member of the Royal Irish Academy. He holds the positions of Visiting Professor at University College London, Bangor University, University of Wales, and Visiting Scientist at the Rotman Research Institute, University of Toronto on year 1995. Previously, he was a senior scientist at the MRC Cognition and Brain Sciences Unit at the University of Cambridge, where he was also a fellow at Hughes Hall College.

A graduate of Glasgow University, Robertson gained his Masters (Clinical Psychology, Institute of Psychiatry) and Doctoral (Neuropsychology) degrees at the University of London.

Ian Robertson has published more than 200 books and articles in leading journals, including Nature, Brain, Journal of Neuroscience, and Psychological Bulletin. Ian has also contributed to public communication and understanding of science, contributing regularly to The Times and The Daily Telegraph, and he is also a columnist for the British Medical Journal. Robertson is an author and editor of ten scientific books, including the leading international textbook on cognitive rehabilitation, Cognitive Neurorehabilitation, and several books for the general reader which have been translated into multiple languages.

== Research interests ==
Ian Robertson's research focuses on behavioural change in people with impaired brain function, through linking novel rehabilitation strategies to underlying models of brain function. Methods which are now widely used and taught internationally include limb activation training for unilateral neglect, sustained attention training for unilateral neglect, and self-alert training for adults with attention deficit hyperactivity disorder. His current research includes several randomized controlled trials of different types of cognitive training with elderly, schizophrenic and ADHD patients. He has also developed with others a widely used method for frontal lobe impairment known as Goal Management Training.

Ian Robertson has also developed a theoretical approach to cognitive rehabilitation and originated some very widely used tests of attention.

== Works ==
- The Winner Effect: How Power Affects Your Brain (Bloomsbury, June 2012)
- Mind Sculpture: Unleashing Your Brain’s Potential
- The Mind's Eye: The Essential Guide to Boosting Your Mental, Emotional and Physical Powers
- The Stress Test: How Pressure Can Make You Stronger and Sharper (Bloomsbury, 2016)
- The Winner Effect: The Neuroscience of Success and Failure (2012)
