= Fair City =

Irish television soap opera (since 1989)

- Genre: Soap opera
- Created by: Margaret Gleeson, Paul Cusack
- Starring: List of characters
- Theme music composer: Columb Farrelly, Andy O'Callaghan
- Country of origin: Ireland
- Original language: English
- No. of series: 35
- No. of episodes: 5170

Production
- Executive producer: Brigie de Courcy
- Producer: Teresa Smith
- Production locations: Ardmore Studios, Bray, County Wicklow (1989–1994), Raidió Teilifís Éireann, Donnybrook, Dublin 4 (1994–present)
- Camera setup: Multiple-camera setup
- Running time: 23 minutes (excluding ad breaks)
- Production company: Raidió Teilifís Éireann

Original release
- Network: RTÉ One
- Release: 18 September 1989 – present

Fair City is an Irish television soap opera which has been broadcast on RTÉ One since 1989. Produced by the public service broadcaster RTE, it first aired on Monday, 18 September 1989. It has won several awards and is both the most popular and the longest running Irish drama serial.

Plots centre on the domestic and professional lives of the residents of Carrigstown, a fictional suburb of the Northside part of the city of Dublin. The area encompasses a restaurant, pub, garage, corner shop, community centre, charity shop, surgery, boxing club (Esker/Carrigstown Boxing Club) and various businesses. Originally aired as one half-hour episode per week for a limited run, the show is now broadcast year round on RTÉ One in four 30-minute episodes per week, at 20:30 on Sunday, 20:00 on Tuesday, 20:30 on Thursday and 19:30 on Friday.

Fair City is the most watched drama in Ireland, with average viewing figures of 550,000. Devised by executive producer Margaret Gleeson and series producer Paul Cusack, it has remained a significant programme in terms of RTÉ's success and audience share, and also in the history of Irish television drama, tackling many controversial and taboo issues previously unseen on Irish television, such as rape and domestic violence.

== Setting ==
Fair City is set in Carrigstown, a fictional suburb of the Northside part of the city of Dublin. "Carrick" is found in many real Irish locations (for instance: Carrickmacross, Carrickfergus, Carrick-on-Shannon, Carrick-on-Suir), and is derived from the Irish-language word carraig, meaning "rock". Many of the scenes take place around the main street in Carrigstown, with notable landmarks on the street including McCoy's pub, Phelan's corner shop (formerly Spar, formerly Doyle's, now Lidl as of 2025), The Hungry Pig (formerly The Bistro), the Community Centre (formerly The Haven) and Vino's (formerly Rainbows Sandwich Bar). Other recurring settings include the Acorn Cabs dispatch centre, the shared office, the Helping Hand charity shop, the surgery and most recently the Peggy Tea coffee shop.

According to the RTÉ Guide, Carrigstown is bounded by Drumcondra to the north, the city centre to the south, East Wall to the east and Phibsboro to the west. Carrigstown takes its name from the village that grew up around the quarries in which granite was mined until the early 20th century – carraig, as noted above, being the Irish-language word for "rock".

Fair City occasionally makes use of real Dublin locations, such as Grafton Street, the Natural History Museum and Dublin Zoo. In 2011, filming took place for the first time outside of Dublin at the National Ploughing Championships. For the 1989 Dublin City Marathon, actors filmed short scenes taking part in the marathon that were edited into the programme in the following episode.

== Characters ==
The series was originally focused on four families: the O'Hanlons, the Kellys, the Clarkes and the Doyles. Some of the earlier characters also included Lily Corcoran, her womanising nephew, Jack Flynn, Paul Brennan, now a billionaire, at the time worked for Jack Flynn, and Linda O'Malley, an acquaintance of Jack's, to whom he had promised fame as a singer.

During the 1990s, the Phelan, Doyle, and Molloy families were introduced and dominated storylines for that decade. Bela and Rita Doyle, along with their brood of six children and Rita's mother Hannah, were involved in many stories. The Phelan family originally consisted of Hughie and Natalie, but later a new branch of the family arrived including Hughie's mother Eunice, and his brother Christy, along with Christy's wife Renee, and their two children Floyd and Farrah. The Molloy family was introduced in the mid-1990s and consisted of patriarch Harry, his wife Dolores, and their two teenage children Wayne and Lorraine.

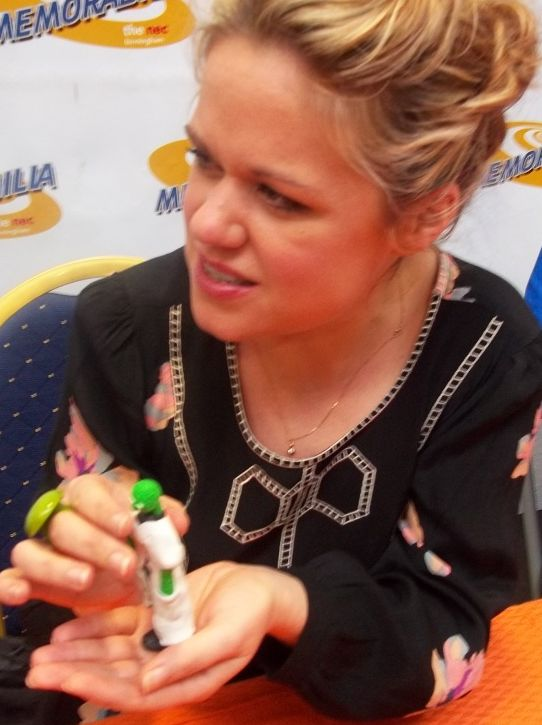
Sinéad Keenan, one of four actresses to play the role of Farrah Phelan in Fair City

The Halpin family was gradually introduced in the early 2000s, starting with Damien Halpin, his mother Tess Halpin and younger siblings Laura and Mark. Since then, the show's focus has shifted to individual characters instead of family groupings. Notable characters introduced subsequently include Carol Meehan, Tracey Kavanagh, Ray O'Connell, and Jo Fahey.

Another change in recent years has been the introduction of ethnic minority characters such as Lana Dowling and the Udenze family. However, the Udenzes moved back to England after the father Gabriel was burnt to death in a fire, and Lana Dowling was kidnapped and murdered. In 2009 an Israeli character was introduced to the show – Avi Bar Lev, Avi hails from the town of Haifa in Israel. In 2013, Ama Chisenga, a devout Christian nurse from Zambia came to Carrigstown, and faced trouble with documentation for immigration. More recently in 2017, two Chilean brothers, Jake and Cristiano came to the show. Jake, who came first, was initially homeless, but later started a relationship with Ama. His gay brother Cristiano soon followed, and both now run a coffee shop, Brewzers, in the Carrigstown Arcade.

2012 brought the additions of the Dillon family – the Father Tommy, the Mother Judith and their three daughters Caoimhe Dillon, Neasa Dillon and Dearbhla Dillon, and their son Zak. The Bishops arrived in 2009, consisting of the mother Vivienne, her sons Decco, Denzo and Zumo and her daughter Charlotte. Vivienne's niece Sash Bishop was introduced in 2011 and the patriarch Paddy Bishop in 2013. The O'Briens came in 2014 – the father Eoghan, the mother Debbie and their daughter Katy and their son Michael.

Paul Brennan is the only character from the first episode currently in the show. Sarah Flood was axed in 2013 after 23 years playing Suzanne Doyle.

Former executive producer Niall Mathews believes the soap's success is due to the large cast and the fact that no single character or group of characters dominates. "Difficulties are inherent if you are dealing with just one family", he says. "Look at Dallas and Dynasty; both did well at the beginning, but because all the action was centred on a single family, the writers ran out of things to say."

Executive Producer Brigie de Courcy said: "I think the big thing that Fair City does that the other soaps don't quite do is that it is really rooted in the community."

== Production ==
Running in parallel with the writing process is the production process, which includes: casting, wardrobe, make-up, design and construction of sets, purchase of props, finding locations, booking facilities, developing schedules, sound, and other administrative tasks involved in managing a large production.

Each week rehearsals for the four episodes take place on Saturday and Monday. Shooting takes place on Tuesday, Wednesday, Thursday and Friday. On Tuesday and Wednesday, the interior scenes are filmed at Studios A and C on RTÉ's Montrose campus. The exterior scenes are filmed on the lot within the grounds of the RTÉ Headquarters on Thursday and on location on Friday. Each day, 15 scenes are filmed. Scripts are prepared up to six months in advance, and episodes are shot six weeks before being aired. Four episodes are filmed every week. After shooting an episode, an editor will go through the episode scene by scene with the director. They will choose which shots to retain and which to cut.

From 1989 until 1994, all interior shots were filmed at Ardmore Studios, near Bray, County Wicklow. In 1994, production moved to studios at Montrose specifically adapted to cater for the show. Like Brookside, all exterior shots were initially filmed at real houses in a real cul-de-sac in Barron Place, Drumcondra and later in Booterstown. Due to the difficulties involved with shooting outside of a controlled environment (e.g. having to negotiate with residents, traffic noise, etc.), it was decided to build a streetscape, known as the lot. In 1992, the Fair City lot was built at Ardmore, where set designers replicated the facades and interiors of the original houses. In 1994, a new lot was built at the grounds of RTÉ. In 2018, production moved again for the first time in decades to the present lot in RTE. On each set appliances such as washing machines and gas cookers do not actually work most of the time.

The show has had four different opening sequences and five different theme tunes. The opening features several scenes of contemporary Dublin, while the closing credits shows a frozen image of the River Liffey.

=== Writing ===
The series is planned in various stages. The first stage is the development of story and plot, which is carried out by a team of writers. Once the stories have been fleshed out and agreed, a scene breakdown is created. The episodes are then assigned to script writers, who create the dialogue and stage directions for the actors.

Writers who have worked on Fair City scripts and storylines include Anna Carey, Sarah Francis, Thomas McLaughlin and Michelle Duffy.

=== Theme tune ===
Fair City's original theme tune was composed by Adam Lynch and Hugh Drumm. They were asked to come up with a piece of music that would be "easy on the ear, have a certain warmth, conjure up a feeling of Dublin and manage to reflect the mood of the programme". The second theme tune was introduced in 1995, the third in 2005 and the fourth in 2008. The 1995 theme is an orchestral version of the original. The 2005 theme is an upbeat piano version of the 1995 one. The present theme, composed by Columb Farrelly and Andy O'Callaghan, is a jazzed up version of the original.

=== Imagery ===
Fair City's original opening sequence was designed by Carol Coffey. The second opening sequence was introduced in 1995 when the then executive producer John Lynch decided that the opening needed modernising. It was designed by John Hayes in collaboration with John Lynch. For 10 years, the opening remained unchanged, aside from the digital insertion of the Millennium Bridge. In order to be compatible with wide-screen format and show the changing face of Dublin, a new opening, designed by Michael McKeon, was introduced in 2005. The present opening, designed by Paul Gibney, was introduced in 2008.

=== Post-production ===
Each episode should run for 23 minutes (not counting ad breaks). If any episode runs over or under them, the executive producer and series editor will cut or add scenes where appropriate so that the episode ends up with the correct running time. As noted in the book Inside Fair City, the episode will "go back to the editing suite and a final edit will be done to produce the finished product that viewers will see on screen".

=== Budget ===
In 2016, Fair City cost RTÉ €53,500 per episode, which adds up to €10.7m annually. Fair City actors earned nearly €460 per day. 15 scriptwriters received €3,495 per episode and nine were paid €1,837. RTE said the writers were given "an additional 35pc of the basic fee per episode in respect of a further broadcast of the episode within seven days. These are rates agreed with the Irish Playwrights and Screenwriters Guild".

== Social realism ==
The show has featured a number of gritty and controversial storylines reflecting major issues in Irish society, particularly from the mid-1990s. Former executive producer Niall Mathews said: "We don't hang out a banner saying we are dealing with rape and murder as issues. One of our characters gets raped and the story is how it affects her, her family and the community. We are not doing issue-driven programs. We use issues to illuminate the characters more than to illuminate the issues."

In 1996, three years after homosexuality was decriminalised in Ireland, male characters Eoghan and Liam moved in for a passionate embrace – only to be interrupted. It would have been the first gay kiss on Irish television. Moving into the 2000s Fair City began to deal with LGBT themes more openly and more regularly. Yvonne Doyle, a key character for much of the early 2000s, was bisexual, and used to date Connie from Australia. They were to have been married in Northern Ireland. Laura, lesbian daughter of Tess Halpin, formed a relationship with social worker Emily, only to have it broken up by the jealous, bitter and deranged Lucy. Troy, the son of Leo Dowling, is openly gay. The programme's first transgender character was Ryan Donnelly, who debuted in 2017 and was played by the trans man Jack Murphy.

Also, in 1996, there was the false accusations story, in which schoolgirl Niamh Cassidy falsely accused her teacher Barry O'Hanlon of coming onto her after she seduced him and they had a passionate embrace. 1996 also saw the first murder on the show when Tony Kelly was killed by London criminal drug-dealers whom he owed money to.

In 1998, the show tackled the subject of rape, with the rape of Lorraine Molloy by Dr Jack Shanahan, who later committed suicide. Also, Kay McCoy began a relationship with Catholic priest Malachy Costello, who then left the priesthood and married Kay in 1999. Leo Dowling's wife Sandie slept with his son Dean after finding out that Leo was having an affair. Helen Doyle died in a car accident. Noeleen and Stephen McCoy were brainwashed by a religious cult called The Church of the Children of Eternal Light. Foster care was shown in 1999 when Kay and Malachy fostered teenager Lorcan Foley. A psychopathic nanny, Mona Fagan, kidnapped Paul Brennan and Nicola Prendergast's baby son Osin.

Abortion was portrayed in 2001 with a story which divided the country when Kay decided to abort her pregnancy against the wishes of the father Malachy. As an older mother, Kay has amniocentesis tests done which reveal the child has trisomy-13 which means that the child would be born severely disabled and probably would not survive long after birth. The storyline was seen by the actors and producers as controversial and heart-breaking. They recognised the time sensitive nature of the decisions that had to be made and the potential impacts and worked to show it all. This storyline caused anti-abortion viewers to complain to the Justice Minister on the grounds that the story was hate speech against people with disabilities.

Drug addiction has also been portrayed a number of times. In 1997, Lorraine Molly became addicted to amphetamines to cram for her exams. One of Fair City's best-known storylines took place in 2001, with crime lord Billy Meehan abusing his wife Carol and mistress Tracey McGuigan before being murdered by Carol's son Lorcan. Prostitution was also shown in 2001 when Tracey turned to prostitution in order to pay for drugs.

Prostate cancer awareness was raised in June 2002 in a storyline depicting Bela Doyle's battle with prostate cancer. Gambling addiction was depicted, with Malachy's gambling addiction. Mental health issues were confronted in December 2002 when Yvonne Doyle developed schizophrenia (which led to her taking a drug overdose in a suicide attempt). In 2003, storylines included teenage pregnancy (14-year-old Kira Cassidy giving birth to a baby girl, Juliet) and Heather Lyons' incestuous relationship with her half-brother Floyd Phelan (though they didn't know they were half-siblings at first). An Accident and Emergency special was aired in March 2003.

Domestic abuse was highlighted with the Halpin family when Tess was murdered by her husband Marty following years of domestic abuse. The episode aired on 3 April 2003 and RTÉ had to set up a help-line following the episode. More recently in 2010, there was a domestic abuse storyline involving Tess's eldest son Damien. This time Damien's partner Suzanne was the abusive person in the relationship and this ultimately led to them breaking up. A week-long special dealt with date rape and teen suicide against the backdrop of the educational system.

In 2004, Fair City continued to feature issues such as eating disorders (Robin McKenna's bulimia) and teacher Sorcha Byrne's illicit affair with 19-year-old student Ross O'Rourke (which culminated in Barry O'Hanlon being overcome by clinical depression and having a mental breakdown). Breast cancer awareness was raised (Nicola's battle with breast cancer). A three-week-long special dealt with Catholic Church politics, the legal system and the clerical sexual abuse of children.

Homelessness was shown in 2005 when Cleo Collins slept rough on the streets. Gangland killing was also featured in 2005 when Mick Mahoney killed Alex Yuschenko, a Ukrainian gang member, under the orders of his new boss crime lord Sylvester Garrigan (which led to his niece Ali O'Shea being held hostage by them in 2006). Also, accidental drug overdose was highlighted, with the death of Dolores Molloy's baby Jessica from an accidental Ecstasy overdose when Ross left some ecstasy tablets on the floor of the Molloy household. A two-week-long special looked at the murkier side of yuppie life against the backdrop of property speculation reflecting the Celtic Tiger.

In 2006, the gangland storyline was revisited, with a chain of bad fortune for Garrigan ultimately leading to his downfall. First, he was wounded in a drive-by shooting, which was an assassination attempt on his life by the Ukrainian gang in retaliation for killing Alex. Subsequently, a sting operation by undercover Garda Rory Goff found drugs that Lorcan was piggybacking on one of Garrigan's booze runs. Garrigan was furious that Lorcan had implicated him in drug-dealing and he ordered Lorcan to kill Rory. As Rory and Lorcan confronted each other, Lorcan fired the first shot, but Rory struck back with another, wounding them both in the process. Rory survived, but Lorcan's days were numbered. Lorcan made a deathbed confession to the Gardaí before he died in hospital. Garrigan was arrested and was never seen again, but he is assumed to be in prison. Tim Carney's domineering marriage with Olga was also featured. Racism was shown when the Udenze family were targeted by racists Pete Flanngan and Morgan Dalton.

In 2007, the show tackled the subject of bullying, with the bullying of Mark Halpin. Missing persons were also highlighted in 2007 with the disappearance of Lana Dowling. In 2008, the show dealt with the issue of euthanasia by featuring Floyd's death in a pact with Heather's husband Brendan. The Criminal Assets Bureau was shown when Carol lost her pub and nightclub which were purchased by Billy with his ill-gotten gains. In 2009 mental health issues were confronted such as Keith McGrath's desertion of the British Army and Bill Taylor's psychological torture over Annette Daly's alcoholism. 2009 also saw the show's first bisexual love triangle and lesbian storyline when Yvonne Doyle had an affair with her best friend Connie Boylan.

In 2010, Damien Halpin's unemployment reflects the Irish financial crisis. In addition the many scenes of domestic abuse towards Damien by his wife Suzanne have brought into the open the taboo subject of spousal abuse towards males. The series has been praised for this edgy and at times controversial storyline. It proved to be so popular that British soap opera Coronation Street later did their own version. Organ donor awareness was raised in 2011 when Lucy Mallon received a cornea transplant. Wearing pyjamas during the day was covered with Sash Bishop. Aside from this, soap opera staples of youthful romance, jealousy, rivalry, gossip and extramarital affairs are regularly featured. Late 2011/early 2012 saw Orla Kirwan and Caoimhe Dillon engage in numerous shoplifting sprees around Dublin. In April 2012, life in prison was covered, with prisoner Decco Bishop fearing for his life behind bars. Domestic violence has been a recurring theme in Fair City, most recently in 2013 with the introduction of the character Paddy Bishop, who is captured on screen flaking his wife Vivienne with a belt.

In December 2013, Yvonne Doyle is raped by Internet predator Martin Baxter. He later bombards her with calls and texts, and calls to her restaurant Vino's and threatens her, but she later reports him to the police. In January 2014, Paul Brennan finds himself the victim of a blackmail plot when Jane extorts €40,000 from him. In March 2014, Yvonne faces a trial which she is terrified about. Also, in February/March 2014, bullying is covered again with the bullying of Rachel Brennan by Amanda Ryan, who torments Rachel along with a group of girls. In April and May 2014, stalking is shown, with stalker Tommy Dillon's campaign of terror towards his ex-wife Judith. Tommy is eventually outed as the stalker and, in late May 2014, holds Judith hostage with a gun. In July 2014, Christy Phelan has a stroke. Katy O'Brien questions her sexuality and becomes the show's first character to come out on-screen.

In August 2015, Fair City took on the issue of miscarriage when couple Damien and Caoimhe lost their baby.

From May 2016 until May 2017, Fair City provided its longest storyline ever, "Who Kidnapped Katy?" The storyline focussed on Katy O'Brien, who was kidnapped and later held hostage in the garage of Ciarán Holloway, who had come to Carrigstown to seek revenge on Emmett O'Brien – Katy's brother – for apparently giving rise to his sister's death in South-East Asia whilst travelling. During this period, Katy had become extremely attached to Ciarán, and later defended his honour on television and to his family, in what would be described as the effects of Stockholm syndrome.

In August 2016, Fair City tackled the issue of child abuse when Carol's father Trigger arrives in Carrigstown and she is forced to face her dark past.

In October 2019, Fair City tackled the issue of domestic abuse in a gay relationship between Cristiano San Martin and Will Casey. The show highlighted abusive behaviour such as psychological and emotional manipulation and gaslighting as Will tormented Cristiano. In the show, Cristiano would often reply to Will's domestic abuse saying "Will, you're scaring me" which was turned into a popular catchphrase in Irish media as a nod to the MeToo Movement and a number of t-shirts were sold sporting the phrase.

Problem gambling was covered in 2024 when Anto was struggling with a Gambling Addiction

== History ==
=== Concept and inspiration ===
In 1988, a year before Fair City hit the screens, the show was just a vague idea conceived by RTÉ when it decided that it needed an urban soap opera to compete with Coronation Street and EastEnders. RTÉ gave the job of creating this new soap to Margaret Gleeson. Gleeson, known for her work on Tolka Row and The Riordans, was appointed the show's first Executive Producer with Paul Cusack and David McKenna as producers. Tony Holland – co-creator of EastEnders – was brought in as a consultant. The target launch date was September 1989 and an initial run of 13 episodes was commissioned.

With the help of Cusack, McKenna and Holland, Gleeson devised the many components needed to make the initial thirteen-episode limited series. She created twenty-two original characters for the soap and cast actors for them. The show had a number of working titles – Glasfin and Northsiders – before settling on Fair City. Gleeson had nine weeks in which to shoot the whole thing.

Fair City derives its title from the opening line of the traditional song "Molly Malone": "In Dublin's fair city, where the girls are so pretty..." and was the only English-language soap opera produced in Ireland until Red Rock was launched on TV3 on 7 January 2015. The show was launched with an hour-long pilot episode, written by Peter Sheridan, on 18 September 1989 and at the time was described as "the most ambitious production of its kind ever undertaken by RTÉ".

=== Early years: 1989–1994 ===
Fair City was not an instant success and was on shaky ground for a couple of seasons. Former executive producer John Lynch recalled: "My impression of it at the time was of nothing happening very fast, then you'd cut to a scene where nothing happened even faster, then there would be a shot of somebody riding a bicycle stuck in between, they were trying to copy Eastenders, but Tony Holland didn't realise that the Irish are less direct than the English."

RTÉ's Director of Television Production at the time described the situation: "Now Fair City had run 17 episodes and there was a big question mark over its future. This had been for several reasons. One was the audience, by far the largest audience had been for the first show and the 17 or the 16 that followed showed a fairly relentless fall in audience figures. And if you're doing something like a soap actually you expect the reverse trend if it's working".

In 1990, RTÉ executives initially cancelled the show after the first season. However, they then decided to renew it for a second season. They brought in Irish writer Mary Halpin to drastically revamp the series.

Tony Tormey, who plays Paul Brennan, explains: "He [Tony Holland] just didn't have the Irish thing. The scripts were all in a different idiom. They were written in Londonese rather than Dublinese. It just didn't work so they cancelled it. But they stuck with it and brought Mary Halpin in. It was almost like starting again."

The introduction of strong story lines centring on the Doyle and Molloy families in the early 1990s began to gradually improve the soap's popularity and were overseen by new executive producer Niall Mathews, who was in charge from 1990 to 2008, apart from the period between 1994 and 1998. He oversaw the show's transformation from a minor, urban drama into one of Ireland's major soaps, challenging Glenroe in the ratings. In 1994 John Lynch became executive producer and during his time Fair City began dealing with gritty and controversial issues previously unseen on Irish television.

=== Later years: 2002–present ===
On 17 January 2002, Fair City reached its 1,000th episode. In 2004, the soap opera celebrated its fifteenth year by broadcasting an hour-long compilation episode entitled Fair City: The Ten Commandments. This episode showed clips of characters breaking the Ten Commandments. It also featured interviews with the cast, writers, creator and fans. On 30 November 2006, Fair City reached its 2,000th episode.

In 2008 veteran Executive Producer Niall Mathews bowed out of the show and was replaced by former Script Editor Brigie de Courcy. During her reign, the soap has received critical acclaim for its more credible, sophisticated and psychological stories. In September 2011, Fair City reached its 3,000th episode. In 2013, the serial's 24th anniversary was celebrated with an hour-long special, in which characters Damien, Caoimhe, Tommy and Luke were trapped in a fire at a factory.

Fair City celebrated its 25th anniversary in September 2014 by airing episodes such as Paul Brennan finding out that his wife Niamh is leaving him for Michael and Christy Phelan's death at the hands of his daughter Farrah's husband Max. In September 2016, the soap reached its 4,000th episode.

19 October 2017 saw the airing of the show's first two-hander episode featuring Paul and Niamh. An hour-long special was shown in September 2019 to celebrate the soap's 30th anniversary.

=== Broadcast format ===
The show was initially aired with one episode per week for a limited run (16 weeks). In 1990, RTÉ opted to recommission the soap and air one episode a week between September and June, taking a summer break. In 1994, its output was increased to twice weekly on Tuesdays and Thursdays at 7pm. In 1996, the series started being broadcast all year around with one weekly episode during the summer months. In 1998 an extra episode was added and a fourth was added in 2001. In 2000, a second weekly episode was added in the summer. In 2003, the programme started airing four episodes all year-round from the summer of that year. In 2004, Friday's 8.30 pm episode was moved to Sunday nights at 8pm. In 2022 Wednesday's night Episode move to Friday night.

In 2023, following the fall out of the governance and management scandals at RTÉ, it was announce that as part of cost saving measures that Fair City would see the number of episodes per week drop to 3 a week during 2024. Four episodes of the series will be recorded each week but production will take a break each year in July and August.

	Sunday	Monday	Tuesday	Wednesday	Thursday	Friday	Saturday	Number of weekly episodes
1989–1991								2
1991–1998								2
1998–2001								3
2001–2004								4
2004–2020								4
2020–2021								3
2021–2022								4
2022 - 2023								4
2024 -								3

=== International screenings ===
- Northern Ireland and Britain

Since early 2001 RTÉ One has also been available on most digital platforms in Northern Ireland through Sky and Virgin Media, Fair City is officially available on this service to audiences in this territory. Prior to 2001 in Northern Ireland, UTV aired episodes of the soap in the early and mid-90s during its daytime schedule. Episodes shown on UTV were seasons behind RTÉ. Prior to the arrival of digital terrestrial television in Europe, many viewers in Northern Ireland, Wales and North-western England could watch Fair City on RTÉ One, because some of those populations were able to receive Irish television through spillover, although signal spillover has reduced since the transition to digital.

Fair City was shown on the Tara Television network in the United Kingdom via cable and Sky Digital from 1997 until the closure of the station in 2002. Classic episodes were shown in the daytime and repeated in the early evenings on weekdays, and current episodes were simulcast with RTÉ One. STV in Scotland announced that it would broadcast the show when the local STV channels rebranded as STV2. The series launched in April 2017 with a thirty-minute documentary entitled Fair City: The Story So Far before airing the Christmas Day episode from 2014.

- International

The show is available to a global audience through RTÉ Player International.

=== Product placement ===
In 2011, BWG Foods, operators of the SPAR brand in Ireland, invested €900,000 in a three-year deal to have SPAR appear in Fair City. The new shop, formerly Christy Phelan's corner shop, was unveiled in an episode broadcast on 6 December 2011. It was RTÉ's first high-profile product placement deal, and followed the Broadcasting Authority of Ireland's decision to allow paid product placement on Irish television, in line with relaxed EU regulations. There are 450 SPAR outlets in the Republic of Ireland. RTÉ was obliged to inform viewers before each episode aired it contained product placement. RTÉ said that Fair City's editor-in-chief would ensure there were no gratuitous references or prominence given to Spar that would not happen anyway.

On 5 March 2025, it was announced that Phelan's shop would become a Lidl supermarket, on foot of a new product placement deal.

=== COVID-19 ===
Due to coronavirus-related lockdown issues, Fair City was taken off air for the first time in its history, with the last filmed episode broadcast on 12 April 2020. After a five-month break, the show returned on Sunday 6 September, three nights a week. The fictional character Renee Phelan got COVID-19 and recovered off air. RTÉ stated in January 2021 that it planned to commence testing actors and production staff for the virus.

== Popularity and viewership ==
Fair City consistently pulls in an average of 300,000-400,000 viewers per episode, rising for special episodes. The soap is popular with viewers nationwide. A constant ratings winner for RTÉ, the show rivals British imports such as Coronation Street and Emmerdale on Virgin Media. The launch show attracted 1.06 million viewers. On 21 November 2001, Fair City attracted 840,000 viewers who tuned in to see Billy Meehan being killed by Lorcan Foley. 660,000 viewers tuned in to watch Sylvester Garrigan get shot on 19 January 2006. 731,000 viewers watched on 23 November 2010 to see the latest development featuring battered husband Damien Halpin. The show was not an instant ratings success in the first couple of seasons, but became more favourable in subsequent seasons, when there were strong story lines centring on the Doyle and Molloy families.

When Fair City returned from a hiatus in late 2020, the show declined substantially, with viewer numbers dipping below average. A slight increase was reported over the Christmas season in 2021.

The Wire star Reg E. Cathey has expressed his interest in a part on the show, saying he would like to play "an American guy coming to meet his daughter who is now a big singer, someone like Laura Izibor".

For a short period in 2017, Fair City aired on Scottish television network STV2.

== Critical reception ==
Reception to the pilot episode was positive from Eamon Dunphy of the Sunday Independent, Brendan Glacken of the Irish Times and Eddie Holt of the Irish Independent. However, over time, the serial was not a critical success, but it has received acclaim recently for its more credible, sophisticated and psychological stories under executive producer Brigie de Courcy. Helena Sheehan has published academic accounts and analyses of its ups and downs.

== Awards ==
The programme was nominated for an IFTA as 'Best Television Drama' in the years 2000 and 2003. Stuart Dunne, who portrayed Billy Meehan, was nominated for an IFTA as 'Best Actor in a Television Drama' in 2003.

Pat Nolan, who plays Barry O'Hanlon, won a Rose d'Or award in the 'Best Soap Actor' category at the international Rose d'Or Festival in Switzerland on 7 May 2005. The series has also been nominated for a TVNow Award as 'Favourite Soap' in 2006, 2007, 2008 and 2009. Its first ever victory, in 2008, was matched by a second victory in 2009. Fair City won 'Best Soap in the International Entertainment' category, at the Mediamixx festival in Bulgaria in July 2007.

== Actors' compensation ==
RTÉ pays some Fair City cast members €432 a day, although the soap generates revenue in the region of €7m each year for RTÉ. Tommy O'Neill, the actor who played Detective Deegan, was embroiled in a row with a taxi driver over a €10 fare in November 2011.

Established actor Tony Tormey, who plays long running character Paul Brennan, was paid between €99,000 and €150,000 a year in 2016 and 2017, this amounted to €4,500 for a shooting week, with a contract for 31 weeks.

== Complaints ==
As a result of a storyline, school managers feared that students were starting "copycat" fight clubs in post primary schools around the country. RTÉ has also launched an investigation into how a convicted child sex offender appeared as an extra in the soap. Fair City was criticised by Down's Syndrome Ireland for using the derogatory term "mongo" on 20 January 2006 episode.

== Broadcast availability ==
At the launch of the RTÉ Player, Fair City was provided for one month as part of the trial service. It was later removed as the actor's union (Equity Ireland) would not agree to terms to provide the show online. On 27 May 2011, RTÉ One +1 launched on Saorview without Fair City, during the broadcast of Fair City the following announcement was made "This programme is not available on Saorview". In May 2012, this changed; and Fair City is now available on both RTÉ One +1 and RTÉ Player.

== Merchandise ==
In 2005, script writer Brian Gallagher wrote a book about the show, entitled Inside Fair City. A 20th anniversary DVD under the title Fair City: 20 Years in Carrigstown was released in 2009.

== See also ==
- List of Fair City characters
- List of soap operas with LGBT characters
- Ros na Rún, similarly long-running soap opera broadcast in the Irish language
