= List of submissions to the 81st Academy Awards for Best Foreign Language Film =

2008 Best Foreign Language Film submissions
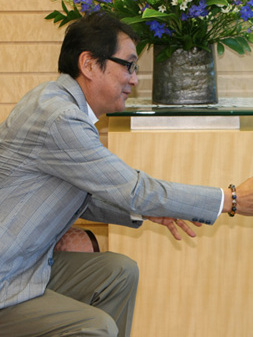
- Yōjirō Takita directed Departures, which won the year's award.

Highlights
- Oscar winner: (Japan) Departures
- Submissions: 67
- Debuts: 1
- Total eligible: 67

This is a list of submissions to the 81st Academy Awards for the Best Foreign Language Film. The Academy of Motion Picture Arts and Sciences (AMPAS) has invited the film industries of various countries to submit their best film for the Academy Award for Best Foreign Language Film every year since the award was created in 1956. The award is presented annually by the Academy to a feature-length motion picture produced outside the United States that contains primarily non-English dialogue. The Foreign Language Film Award Committee oversees the process and reviews all the submitted films.

For the 81st Academy Awards, the submitted motion pictures must have first been released theatrically in their respective countries between 1 October 2007 and 30 September 2008. The deadline for submissions to the Academy was 1 October 2008. 67 countries submitted films and were found to be eligible by AMPAS and screened for voters. Jordan submitted a film for the first time, while Latvia made a submission for the first time since 1992. After the 9-film shortlist was announced on 13 January 2009, the five nominees were announced on 22 January 2009.

Japan won the award for the fourth time with Departures by Yōjirō Takita, marking its first competitive win after three Honorary Awards since 1956.

== Submissions ==
Submitting country	Film title used in nomination	Original title	Language(s)	Director(s)	Result
Afghanistan	Opium War	جنگ تریاک	Dari, English	Siddiq Barmak	Not nominated
Albania	The Sorrow of Mrs. Schneider	Smutek paní Šnajderové / Trishtimi i zonjës Shnajder	Czech, Slovak, Albanian	Eno and Piro Milkani	Not nominated
Algeria	Masquerades	مسخرة / Mascarades	Arabic, French	Lyes Salem	Not nominated
Argentina	Lion's Den	Leonera	Spanish, French	Pablo Trapero	Not nominated
Austria	Revanche		German, Russian, Waldviertel German	Götz Spielmann	Nominated
Azerbaijan	Fortress	Qala	Azerbaijani	Shamil Nacafzada	Not nominated
Bangladesh	Aha!	আহা!	Bengali, North Central Bengali	Enamul Karim Nirjhar	Not nominated
Belgium	Eldorado		French	Bouli Lanners	Not nominated
Bosnia and Herzegovina	Snow	Snijeg	Bosnian, English	Aida Begić	Not nominated
Brazil	Last Stop 174	Última Parada 174	Brazilian Portuguese	Bruno Barreto	Not nominated
Bulgaria	Zift	Дзифт	Bulgarian	Javor Gardev	Not nominated
Canada	The Necessities of Life	Ce qu'il faut pour vivre / ᐃᓅᔾᔪᑎᒃᓴᖅ	French, Inuktitut	Benoît Pilon	Made shortlist
Chile	Tony Manero		Spanish, English	Pablo Larraín	Not nominated
China	Dream Weavers: Beijing 2008	筑梦	Mandarin, English	Jun Gu	Not nominated
Colombia	Dog Eat Dog	Perro come perro	Spanish	Carlos Moreno	Not nominated
Croatia	No One's Son	Ničiji sin	Croatian, Serbian	Arsen Anton Ostojić	Not nominated
Czech Republic	The Karamazovs	Karamazovi	Czech, Polish, English, Slovene	Petr Zelenka	Not nominated
Denmark	Worlds Apart	To verdener	Danish	Niels Arden Oplev	Not nominated
Egypt	The Island	الجزيرة	Arabic	Sherif Arafa	Not nominated
Estonia	I Was Here	Mina olin siin. Esimene arest	Estonian	René Vilbre	Not nominated
Finland	The Home of Dark Butterflies	Tummien perhosten koti	Finnish	Dome Karukoski	Not nominated
France	The Class	Entre les murs	French, Bambara	Laurent Cantet	Nominated
Georgia	Mediator	მედიატორი	Georgian, German, Russian, English	Dito Tsintsadze	Not nominated
Germany	The Baader Meinhof Complex	Der Baader Meinhof Komplex	German, English, French, Swedish, Arabic	Uli Edel	Nominated
Greece	Correction	Διόρθωση	Greek, Albanian	Thanos Anastopoulos	Not nominated
Hong Kong	Painted Skin	畫皮	Mandarin	Gordon Chan	Not nominated
Hungary	Iska's Journey	Iszka utazása	Hungarian, Romanian	Csaba Bollók	Not nominated
Iceland	White Night Wedding	Brúðguminn	Icelandic	Baltasar Kormákur	Not nominated
India	Like Stars on Earth	तारे ज़मीन पर	Hindi	Aamir Khan	Not nominated
Iran	The Song of Sparrows	آواز گنجشکها	Persian, Azerbaijani	Majid Majidi	Not nominated
Israel	Waltz with Bashir	ואלס עם באשיר	Hebrew, Arabic, German, English	Ari Folman	Nominated
Italy	Gomorrah	Gomorra	Neapolitan, Italian, Mandarin, French	Matteo Garrone	Not nominated
Japan	Departures	おくりびと	Japanese	Yōjirō Takita	Won Academy Award
Jordan	Captain Abu Raed	كابتن أبو رائد	Arabic, English, French	Amin Matalqa	Not nominated
Kazakhstan	Tulpan	Тюльпан	Kazakh, Russian	Sergey Dvortsevoy	Not nominated
Kyrgyzstan	Tengri: Blue Heavens	Tengri, le bleu du ciel / Тенгри	Kyrgyz, Russian	Marie Jaoul de Poncheville	Not nominated
Latvia	Defenders of Riga	Rīgas sargi	Latvian, Russian, German, French	Aigars Grauba	Not nominated
Lebanon	Under the Bombs	Sous les bombes / تحت القصف	Arabic, French	Philippe Aractingi	Not nominated
Lithuania	Loss	Nereikalingi žmonės	Lithuanian, English	Māris Martinsons	Not nominated
Luxembourg	Arabian Nights	Nuits d'Arabie	French, Luxembourgish, Arabic	Paul Kieffer	Not nominated
(North Macedonia) Macedonia	I Am From Titov Veles	Јас сум од Титов Велес	Macedonian	Teona Strugar Mitevska	Not nominated
Mexico	Tear This Heart Out	Arráncame la vida	Spanish	Roberto Sneider	Made shortlist
Morocco	Goodbye Mothers	وداعا أمهات / Adieu mères	Arabic, French	Mohamed Ismaïl	Not nominated
Netherlands	Dunya and Desie	Dunya en Desie in Marokko	Dutch, Arabic	Dana Nechushtan	Not nominated
Norway	O' Horten		Norwegian	Bent Hamer	Not nominated
Palestine	Salt of this Sea	ملح هذا البحر	Arabic, English, Hebrew	Annemarie Jacir	Not nominated
Philippines	Ploning		Cuyonon, Filipino, Taiwanese Hokkien	Dante Nico Garcia	Not nominated
Poland	Tricks	Sztuczki	Polish, Italian	Andrzej Jakimowski	Not nominated
Portugal	Our Beloved Month of August	Aquele Querido Mês de Agosto	Portuguese, English, French	Miguel Gomes	Not nominated
Romania	The Rest is Silence	Restul e tăcere	Romanian, French	Nae Caranfil	Not nominated
Russia	Mermaid	Русалка	Russian	Anna Melikyan	Not nominated
Serbia	The Tour	Турнеја	Serbian, Bosnian, Croatian	Goran Marković	Not nominated
Singapore	My Magic	மை மேஜிக்	Tamil, Singaporean Hokkien, English, Malay	Eric Khoo	Not nominated
Slovakia	Blind Loves	Slepé lásky	Slovak	Juraj Lehotský	Not nominated
Slovenia	Rooster's Breakfast	Petelinji zajtrk	Slovene	Marko Naberšnik	Not nominated
South Africa	Jerusalema		Tsotsitaal, Afrikaans, English, Zulu, Setswana, Sotho	Ralph Ziman	Not nominated
South Korea	Crossing	크로싱	Korean, Mandarin, Mongolian, German, English	Kim Tae-kyun	Not nominated
Spain	The Blind Sunflowers	Los girasoles ciegos	Spanish	José Luis Cuerda	Not nominated
Sweden	Everlasting Moments	Maria Larssons eviga ögonblick	Swedish, Finnish	Jan Troell	Made shortlist
Switzerland	The Friend	Der Freund	Swiss German	Micha Lewinsky	Not nominated
Taiwan	Cape No. 7	海角七號	Taiwanese Hokkien, Japanese, Mandarin, Hakka, English, Paiwan, Rukai	Wei Te-sheng	Not nominated
Thailand	Love of Siam	รักแห่งสยาม	Thai, Teochew Min, Mandarin	Chookiat Sakveerakul	Not nominated
Turkey	Three Monkeys	Üç Maymun	Turkish	Nuri Bilge Ceylan	Made shortlist
Ukraine	Illusion of Fear	Ілюзія страху / Иллюзия страху	Ukrainian, Russian	Aleksandr Kirienko	Not nominated
United Kingdom	Hope Eternal		Bemba, Swahili, Afrikaans, Welsh, English, French	Karl Francis	Not nominated
Uruguay	Kill Them All	Matar a todos	Spanish	Esteban Schroeder	Not nominated
Venezuela	The Color of Fame	El tinte de la fama	Spanish	Alejandro Bellame Palacios	Not nominated

== Notes ==
- South Korea's selection was highly controversial when its submission, Crossing by Kim Tae-kyun, was initially in question when it was accused of plagiarism by a rival writer. The Korean Film Council said it would select another submission if Crossing was found guilty, but the case was ultimately dismissed and the film was retained.
- Vietnam's Ministry of Culture, Sports and Tourism launched an open call for films to represent the country, but only received one entry: Black Forest by Vương Đức. On September 29, the Ministry decided not to send any film since Black Forest did not meet Oscar requirements to have run one consecutive week in a commercial cinema.
- Bolivia and Puerto Rico, formally announced at the end of September that they would not be participating in this year's competition.
