= Offers =

2005 Dutch television film

- Written by: Alma Popeyus; Hein Schütz
- Directed by: Dana Nechushtan
- Starring: Maryam Hassouni; Jacob Derwig
- Music by: Han Otten
- Country of origin: Netherlands
- Original languages: Arabic; Dutch; English

Production
- Producer: Minka Mooren
- Cinematography: Menno Westendorp
- Editor: J.P. Luijsterburg
- Running time: 100 minutes
- Budget: € 700.000

Original release
- Release: 2005

Offers is a 2005 Dutch television film directed by Dana Nechushtan and starring Maryam Hassouni and Jacob Derwig. The thriller film is a personal drama about suicide bombers and counter-terrorism in Western Europe.

In 2006 Maryam Hassouni won an International Emmy Award for her role as Laila al Gatawi.

== Plot ==
Khalid al Gatawi (Iliass Ojja) is about to become a suicide bomber in Paris. Even though he hesitates, his bomb is detonated from a distance by a cell phone. In the explosion a Dutch woman is killed and her Lebanese husband is seriously injured. Haron Nasrallah (Jacob Derwig), the son of the senior couple, is a police officer in Amsterdam. When the trail of the bombing leads back to the Netherlands, he decides to cooperate with the secret intelligence service.

Khalid and his two sisters Laila (Maryam Hassouni) and Alisha al Gatawi (Mimi Ferrer) wanted to avenge their father's death. Mokhtar (Sabri Saad El-Hamus) will arrange the suicide bombings for Laila and Alisha. Haron goes to Alisha's house and discovers she is pregnant. Laila catches him and forces him with a gun to bring her to Alisha. They find out Alisha tries to flee abroad with her boyfriend. Alisha and her boyfriend get killed by a bomb thrown in their car. When Haron is seen with Laila during their pursuit the police is going after the both of them.

The Dutch ambassador in Egypt helps Mokhtar by giving false papers to future suicide bombers. Laila finds a memory stick with information about suicide bombers, but also information that the Dutch ambassador in Egypt was cooperating with Mokhtar. Mokhtar decides to kill the Dutch ambassador in Egypt. With the memory stick Laila and Haron try to make a deal for their freedom and future safety with the secret intelligence service.

Haron meets Mokhtar and, because he doesn't want to blow his cover, he joins Laila in a suicide bombing on Queen's Day in Amsterdam. Both Haron and Laila record a video testament. He negotiates with his colleagues how they will prevent the bombs from exploding. When his colleagues catch Haron he is handed over to the United States for suspected involvement in other terrorist attacks. When they catch Laila one agent leads her outside the Queen's Day crowd and let her bomb explode in a small alley.

== Cast ==
List of actors from the film with their character names:

- Mohammed Azaay as Hafid
- Abdenbi Azzaoui as Driss
- Jacob Derwig as Haron Nasrallah
- Sabri Saad El-Hamus as Mokhtar
- Mimi Ferrer as Alisha al Gatawi
- Tygo Gernandt as Kevin
- Casper Gimbrère as Hidde
- Aus Greidanus as Stokvis
- Maryam Hassouni as Laila al Gatawi
- Ricky Koole as Lidy
- Marcel Musters as Frans
- Michiel Nooter
- Iliass Ojja as Khalid al Gatawi
- Abdullah Ahmed Saleh as Mr. Nasrallah
- Mark Scholten as Peter
- Wim Van Der Grijn
- Marisa Van Eyle as Detective
- Stefan de Walle as Buiter
- René van Zinnicq Bergman as Frits

== Production ==
Offers was filmed in Amsterdam and Paris. The television film was broadcast by VARA.

== Awards ==
- International Emmy Award (2006) for Best Performance by an Actress for Maryam Hassouni
