= Erik de Vogel =

Dutch actor (born 1961)

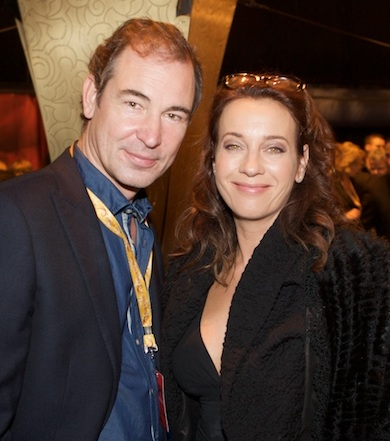
- Erik de Vogel (left) and Marjolein Keuning (2010)
- Born: 2 May 1961 (age 64); Haarlem, Netherlands

Erik de Vogel (born 2 May 1961) is a Dutch actor. He is known for playing the role of Ludo Sanders in the soap opera Goede tijden, slechte tijden for over 25 years. He also played the role of Hoofdpiet for several years during the Sinterklaas celebrations.

== Career ==
As of December 1996, he is playing the role of Ludo Sanders in the soap opera Goede tijden, slechte tijden. He is often the villain in many storylines in the series. His character is the father of Marly van der Velden's character Nina Mauricius–Sanders.

De Vogel played the role of Hoofdpiet between 1994 and 1997 during the annual arrival of Sinterklaas in the Netherlands. Erik van Muiswinkel succeeded him in this role. De Vogel also appeared in this role in the 1995 television film Pepernoten voor Sinterklaas and in the television show Telekids. He also made a cameo appearance in the 2019 film De Brief voor Sinterklaas directed by Lucio Messercola.

In 2005, he had a guest role in the film Deuce Bigalow: European Gigolo directed by Mike Bigelow.

In 2019, he played the lead role in the film Nachtwacht: Het Duistere Hart directed by Gert-Jan Booy. He also appeared in multiple episodes of De TV Kantine.

De Vogel played a role in the drama television series Een moord kost meer levens. The television series is based on the 1994 book of the same name by crime journalist Peter R. de Vries. The show aired on Videoland.

In 2026, De Vogel and Caroline de Bruijn appeared on stage in the show Dial M for Murder.

== Personal life ==
De Vogel has a daughter with Caroline De Bruijn. De Bruijn plays the role of Janine Elschot in Goede tijden, slechte tijden.

== Selected filmography ==
=== Television ===
- 1991: 12 steden, 13 ongelukken (1 episode)
- 1993: Bureau Kruislaan (1 episode)
- 1994: De laatste carrière (1 episode)
- 1996: Verhalen uit de bijbel (1 episode)
- 1996: Baantjer (1 episode)
- 1996 – present: Goede tijden, slechte tijden
- 2018 – 2019: De TV Kantine
- 2023: Een moord kost meer levens

=== Film ===
- 1995: Pepernoten voor Sinterklaas (television film)
- 1995: Flodder 3
- 1998: Goede tijden, slechte tijden: De reünie (television film)
- 2005: Deuce Bigalow: European Gigolo
- 2014: Kris Kras
- 2019: De Brief voor Sinterklaas
- 2019: Nachtwacht: Het Duistere Hart
