= Dunya en Desie =

2002 Dutch youth television series

- Genre: Teen drama
- Written by: Robert Alberdingk Thijm
- Directed by: Dana Nechushtan
- Starring: Maryam Hassouni; Eva van de Wijdeven
- Country of origin: Netherlands
- Original languages: Dutch; Moroccan Arabic
- No. of episodes: 19

Original release
- Network: NPS; NTS
- Release: 22 May 2002 – 20 May 2004

Dunya en Desie (English: Dunya and Desie) is a Dutch youth television series by Dana Nechushtan, written by Robert Alberdingk Thijm. The series focuses on the lives and adolescent problems of two girls from Amsterdam-Noord, Dunya El-Beneni (Maryam Hassouni) and Desie Koppenol (Eva van de Wijdeven).

== Synopsis ==
Dunya comes from a Moroccan family and experiences a world in which the rules at home are sometimes very different from those of the Dutch outside world of her best friend. Desie Koppenol comes from a single-parent family and lives with her mother in a typically all-girl household. She is somewhat less intelligent than Dunya, but she has a heart of gold. Both girls struggle with different questions in life, but are able to talk about them well together.

== Cast and characters ==
- Maryam Hassouni as Dunya
- Eva van de Wijdeven as Desie
- Christine van Stralen as Monique
- Theo Maassen as Jeff
- Rachida Iaallala as Kenza
- Aziz Chaoufi as Soufian
- Karim Mounir as Nabil
- Inge Schrama as Deborah

== Production ==
Three seasons of Dunya & Desie were produced by the NPS. The first two focus primarily on how adolescents from different backgrounds view the world. In the third series, Dunya and Desie attend different schools (Dunya goes to HAVO, while Desie attends hairdressing school), and the emphasis is mainly on growing older. Reruns of Dunya & Desie have been broadcast by the NTR, the successor to the NPS, since 2010.

== Awards ==
The series has won several awards both in the Netherlands and internationally, including the Gouden Beeld for Best Drama Series, the Prix Jeunesse, and the Premio Ondas (Best European youth series). In 2004 and 2005 Dunya & Desie was nominated for an Emmy Award.

In 2017, De Volkskrant assembled an expert jury to give a ranking of the top ten Dutch drama series since 1990, with Dunya & Desie being awarded fifth place.

== Film ==
In April 2008, the film Dunya and Desie was released. It picks up the story when the girls are eighteen and dealing with their own life questions, which are completely different for each of them.

The lead roles are once again played by Maryam Hassouni and Eva van de Wijdeven. Tygo Gernandt plays the driving instructor, Desie's new boyfriend after she breaks up with her boss.
