= Mohammed Azaay =

Moroccan-Dutch actor

- Born: Mohammed Azaay; July 1, 1976 (age 49); Tétouan, Morocco
- Occupation: Actor
- Years active: 1996–

Mohammed Azaay (born 1 July 1976 in Tétouan, Morocco) is a Moroccan-Dutch actor. Azaay graduated from arts college Amsterdamse Hogeschool voor de Kunsten in 2000 as actor. Together with Karim El Guennouni he has a project called "De Varkensfabriek", named after their successful 2004 performance. He also played in "Het Nationale Toneel", "Het Toneel Speelt" and "Theaterhuis Alba". Aside from theatre, Azaay played in several films and TV series, most notably Offers.

== Television ==
- 2023 Golden Hour
- 2008–2009 Deadline
- 2008–2009 Sorry Minister
- 2007–2008 De Vloer op (To the floor)
- 2006 Het Huis Anubis (The House Anubis)
- 2005 Keyzer en De Boer (Keyzer and De Boer)
- 2005 Geluk van Nederland (Luck of The Netherlands)
- 2001 Hallo Holland (Hello Holland)
- 1999–2002 Bradaz
- 1996 Marrakech

== Films ==
- 2024 Loverboy Emoties Uit (2024 film)
- 2019 Domino
- 2007 Sarah & Hij (Sarah and He)
- 2006 Dennis P.
- 2006 Blondje (Blondy)
- 2005 Impasse
- 2005 Offers
- 2000 Lek (Leak)
- 1998 Sombermansactie (Sad man's action)
- 1997 De Boekverfilming (The book adaption)
