= Melissa Drost =

Dutch actress (born 1985)

- Born: 3 May 1985 (age 40); Schagen, Netherlands
- Occupation: Actor
- Years active: 2011-present
- Known for: Goede tijden, slechte tijden

Melissa Drost (born 3 May 1985) is a Dutch actress. She gained national fame through her role as Sjors Langeveld in the show Goede tijden, slechte tijden, which she has played from 2017 until 2020.

== Career ==
As a child Drost played violin and performed classical ballet. She studied Japanology at Leiden University, and after obtaining her bachelor she decided to attend the Conservatorium of Amsterdam to study musical theater, completing her studies in 2011.

During her studies Drost interned at the musical production of Soldaat van Oranje. After finishing her studies she was cast as the lady of the court (hofdame) Tessa, and later also regularly played the female lead role of Charlotte, initially as an understudy and then as first cast. After her time with Soldaat, Drost played in other musicals and plays, most notably De Tweeling in 2016, taking on the lead roles of Anna and Lotte.

Alongside her theater-roles, Drost also acted in television series. Her first lead role came in 2013, when she played Laura Smit in Malaika. Subsequently, she was cast in the role of teacher Roos in the eponymous show Juf Roos from 2015 to 2019.

In 2017 Drost was cast as Sjors Langeveld in Goede tijden, slechte tijden (GTST), taking over the role from Inge Schrama who left due to a burn-out. Initially meant to be a temporary replacement until Schrama's recovery, when she decided to quit the show altogether Drost stayed in the role until 2020.

== Personal life ==
Drost has a daughter from a relationship with actor Lykele Muus, whom she met on the set of Soldaat van Oranje. They ended their six-year relationship in 2017, and remain on good terms. Between 2018 and 2019 Drost had a relationship with fellow GTST actor Alkan Çöklü.

== Filmography ==
Film
Year	Production	Role	Notes
2016	Rokjesdag	Paulien	Supporting role
2018	No. 8739	Louise van der Laan	Short film for 48 Hour Film Project
2019	Juf Roos is jarig	Juf Roos	Lead role
2020	Casanova's	Rachel	
2021	Liefde zonder grenzen	Sanne	
2022	Kwestie van geduld	Jeanne Bartels	
Television
Year	Production	Role	Notes
2013	Malaika	Laura Smit	Lead role
2015	Danni Lowinski	Lotte Dijkzicht	Supporting role
2015	Jeuk	Melissa	Supporting role
2015–19	Juf Roos	Juf Roos	Lead role
2016	Nieuwe Tijden	Sabine	Guest role
2016	Weemoedt	Marianka	Guest role
2017–20	Goede tijden, slechte tijden	Sjors Langeveld	Recurring role
2022	Flikken Maastricht	Inge Janssons	Guest role
Theater
Year	Production	Role	Notes
2013	Soldaat van Oranje	Charlotte	Lead role
