= Meskina =

2021 Dutch romantic comedy film

- Directed by: Daria Bukvic
- Written by: Daria Bukvic; Fadua El Akchaoui; Ernst Gonlag
- Produced by: Jeroen Koopman; Lisa May Visser
- Starring: Maryam Hassouni; Soundos El Ahmadi
- Cinematography: Ezra Reverda
- Edited by: Joshua Menco
- Music by: Matthijs Kieboom
- Release date: 22 July 2021
- Running time: 94 minutes
- Country: Netherlands
- Language: Dutch

Meskina is a 2021 Dutch romantic comedy film. The film was a passion project of Dutch-Moroccan Stand-up comedian Soundos El Ahmadi, who wanted to see more representation of the Moroccan community in Dutch films.

The movie was released on Netflix globally as an Original on March 4, 2022 for three years.

== Cast ==
- Maryam Hassouni as Leyla Idrissi
- Soundos El Ahmadi as Amira, Leyla's older sister
- Rachida Iaallala as Najat, Leyla and Amira's mother
- Olaf Ait Tami as Abdelkarim, Leyla's ex-husband
- Jouman Fattal as Malika, Leyla's cousin
- Oscar Aerts as Klaas, Amira's husband
- Najib Amhali as Ali
- Bilal Wahib as Rayan
- Nasrdin Dchar as Amin
- Vincent Banic as Fabian
- Fahd Larhzaoui as Ibrahim
- Fadua El Akchaoui as Fatima
- Nora Akachar as Farida
- Joy Delima as Patricia
- Siham Bolakhrif as Yasmina
- Sabri Saddik as Yassin
- Yasmin Karssing as Alicia X

== Reception ==
The film received mostly mixed reviews. Algemeen Dagblad said that the film had too many romcom-clichés and caricatures for the people to feel real. De Volkskrant also mentioned the romcom-clichés and wished the film had more depth to it. However NRC Handelsblad was a bit more positive saying that the film aims for a young audience but with the pace of the jokes could also get other people invested. The film was sold out on its openingweekend.

== Controversy ==
It is the first film of actor Bilal Wahib after a widely reported incident in which he asked a minor to expose himself on Instagram Live.
