= Leontien Ceulemans =

Dutch actress and television and radio presenter

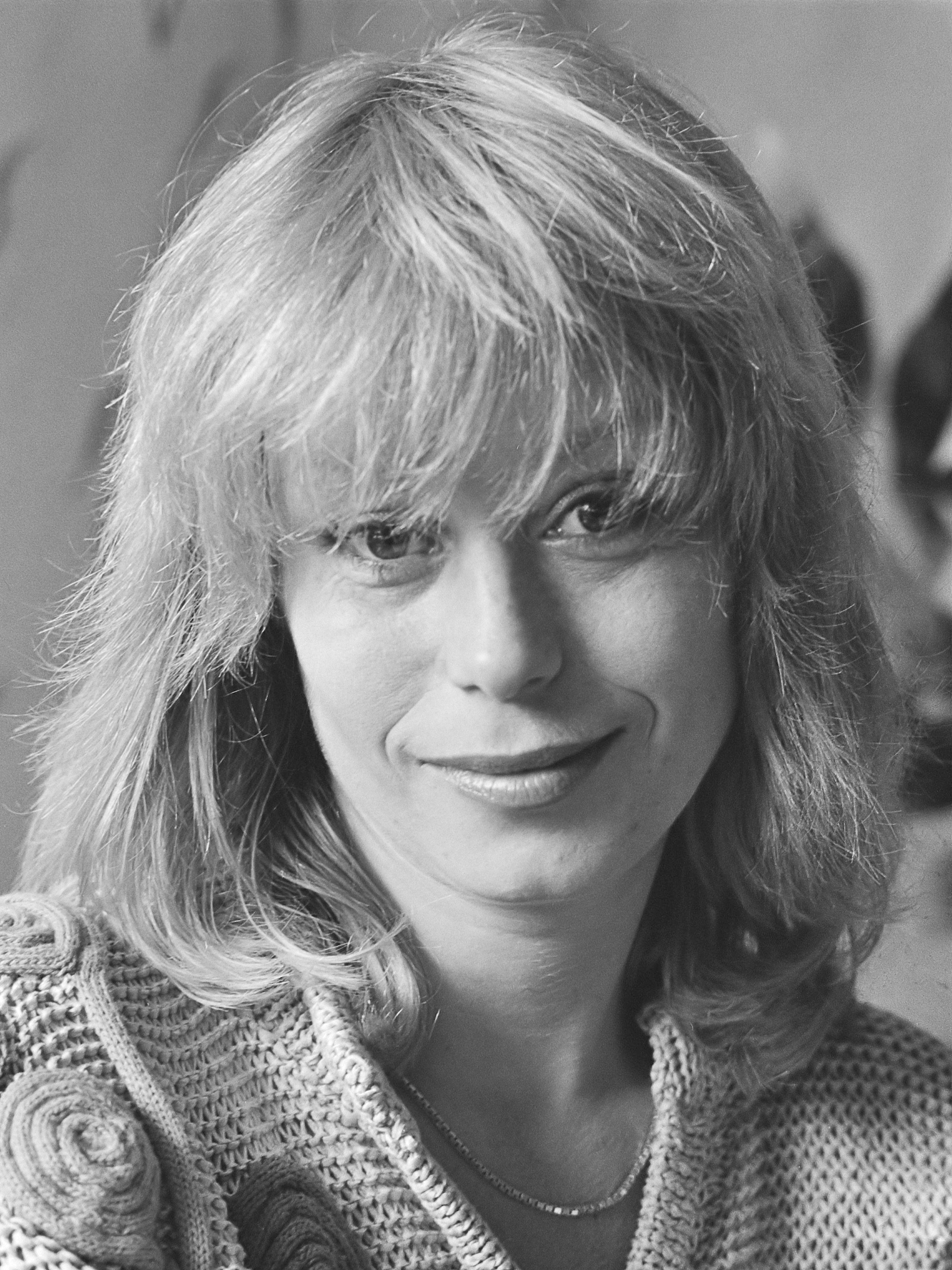
- Leontien Ceulemans in 1982
- Born: Johannah Leontina Ceulemans; 8 January 1952; Amsterdam, Netherlands
- Died: 28 July 2022 (aged 70); Laren, Netherlands
- Occupations: Actress, television presenter
- Known for: Jeugdjournaal

Johannah Leontina "Leontien" Ceulemans (8 January 1952 – 28 July 2022) was a Dutch actress and television and radio presenter. She is best known as the first presenter of the NOS children's news programme Jeugdjournaal.

== Early life ==
Ceulemans was born and raised in Amsterdam. Her mother was actress Hetty Berger, who worked in theatre, radio, and television, and her father was a guitarist and vocalist for various radio orchestras. Through her parents' work, Ceulemans became familiar with broadcasting at a young age and appeared as a child in the radio programme Kleutertje luister of broadcaster AVRO. She later sang with the AVRO Children's Choir.

Initially drawn to dance, Ceulemans trained at the Scapino Ballet, which led to performances in television shows such as Johnny en Rijk, Zaterdagavondakkoorden, and the pop programme Moef ga-ga. She later attended drama school and began working in the theatre.

== Career ==
In 1972, Ceulemans made her debut as a television presenter with the VARA pop music programme Popzien. During the 1970s she combined presenting with acting, appearing in television series such as Vader en Zoon, Zwerven met Swiebertje, Oorlogswinter, and the children's series De holle bolle boom. She also worked in film and radio, presenting programmes for Veronica and the TROS.

In 1981, Ceulemans became the first presenter of the NOS Jeugdjournaal. In addition to presenting, she worked as an editor and helped build the programme from its inception prior to its first broadcast. After nearly two years, she left the programme because of ongoing conflicts with the editorial staff.

Following her departure, Ceulemans continued to alternate between acting, presenting, and voice work. She worked as producer, presenter, and editor for arts and culture programmes on Classic FM, and appeared as an actress in series including soap opera Goede tijden, slechte tijden. She was also active as a voice-over artist for television programmes and animated productions.

== Later life and death ==
In her later years, Ceulemans withdrew from public life due to declining health. She died on 28 July 2022 at the Rosa Spier Huis in Laren after a prolonged illness following a fall.
