= Marrakech (film) =

1996 film

- Written by: Gerard Thoolen, Simon de Waal
- Directed by: Michiel van Jaarsveld
- Country of origin: Netherlands
- Original language: Dutch

Production
- Running time: 90 minutes

Original release
- Release: 12 October 1996

Marrakech is a 1996 Dutch TV film directed by Michiel van Jaarsveld.

== Cast ==
- Mohammed Azaay
- Sacha Bulthuis ... Mathilde Trapper
- Angelique de Bruijne ... Doreen
- Eric de Visser ... Walter Berkhoff
- Khaldoun Elmecky ... Ambassador
- Leo Hogenboom
- Mnine Houcine ... Abdul
- Tom Jansen ... Simon Trapper
- Ari Kant
- Ahmed Lahlil
- Rudolf Lucieer ... Pathologist
- Rachida Machnoue
- Mimoun Oaïssa ... Aziz Jelali
- Jawad Sadouk ... El Ayashi
- Karim Traïdia ... Rachid Ouaridia
- Mustapha Ziraoui
