= Dunya and Desi =

2008 Dutch film

Dunya and Desie
- Theatrical release poster
- Directed by: Dana Nechushtan
- Screenplay by: Robert Alberdingk Thijm
- Based on: Dunya en Desie
- Produced by: Leontine Petit; Joost de Vries
- Starring: Maryam Hassouni; Eva van de Wijdeven
- Cinematography: Bert Pot
- Edited by: J.P. Luijsterburg
- Music by: Steve Willaert
- Production companies: Lemming Film; NPS
- Distributed by: Independent Films
- Release date: 17 April 2008
- Running time: 97 minutes
- Country: Netherlands
- Language: Dutch
- Box office: $2,184,787

Dunya and Desie (Dutch: Dunya en Desie in Marokko – "Dunya and Desie in Morocco") is a 2008 Dutch film about the friendship between two Dutch teenage girls. Directed by Dana Nechushtan, it is based on the television series Dunya en Desie ("Dunya and Desie"), which aired over three seasons (2002–2004). The film was chosen as the Netherlands' official submission to the 81st Academy Awards for Best Foreign Language Film, but it was not nominated. It won a Golden Film, an award recognizing box office achievements in the Netherlands.

== Plot ==
Dunya El-Benini and Desie Koppenol are best friends, each nearly 18 years old. Dunya is of Moroccan ancestry but was born in the Netherlands. She narrates the film.

Dunya notes how Desie juggles multiple boyfriends. Desie works as a hairdresser and was dating her boss, Mike. However, in a moment of anger at him, she quits her job. When Desie misses her period, she uses a home pregnancy test that confirms she is pregnant. She learns from her mother, Monique, that she herself was the result of an unplanned pregnancy when Monique was young. Her father, Hans Schakel, abandoned them and moved to Morocco soon after Desie was born. Desie contemplates having an abortion and obtains a referral, but she decides not to undergo the procedure.

On her 18th birthday, Dunya learns that she is to be married by arrangement to a cousin in Morocco. She and her family move to a newly built house there. Upon arrival, they discover the home is not completed. Dunya meets the cousin to whom she is to be married and is not attracted to him. However, she notices a young man, Samir, who is part of the house-building crew, and is drawn to him.

Desie digs up a secret "treasure chest" of personal items of interest to both her and Dunya. In it, she finds the Moroccan address of her father. Desie decides to go to Morocco to meet him. She surprises Dunya and her family when she arrives unannounced at their house. During her brief stay with them, she scandalises the family with her behaviour and attire. Tensions develop between her and Dunya, but ultimately, Dunya decides to accompany Desie on her search for her father, as she feels that Desie will not survive alone in Morocco.

The two girls travel to Casablanca and into rural Morocco. Desie's luggage is taken by two con men. The young women must visit a hospital after Desie shows signs of bleeding from the pregnancy. They learn that her father worked in the city at the docks, but he left that job years earlier and opened a gas station and restaurant away from urban areas. Although the duo squabble and almost part ways, they reconcile and continue their search. Meanwhile, Desie's mother and her boyfriend Jeff are concerned over her disappearance, and they travel to Morocco to find her.

== Cast ==
- Maryam Hassouni as Dunya El-Beneni
- Eva van de Wijdeven as Desie Koppenol
- Tygo Gernandt as Pim
- Theo Maassen as Jeff Schouten
- Christine van Stralen as Monique, Desie's mother
- Ilias Addab as Samir
- Mahjoub Benmoussa as Nabil El-Beneni
- Micha Hulshof as Maik
- Rachida Iaallala as Kenza El-Beneni
- Iliass Ojja as Souffian 'Zoef' El-Beneni
- Abdullah Ahmed Saleh as Dunya's grandfather
- Marcel Musters as Hans Schakel
- Alix Adams as Mrs. Schakel

== Release ==
Home media

The film was released on DVD and Blu-ray by Warner Home Video on 10 September 2008.

== Awards ==
The film was chosen as the Netherlands' official submission to the 81st Academy Awards for Best Foreign Language Film, but it was not nominated. It won a Golden Film, an award recognizing box office achievements in the Netherlands.

== See also ==
- List of submissions to the 81st Academy Awards for Best Foreign Language Film
- List of Dutch submissions for the Academy Award for Best Foreign Language Film
