= Suan-Li Ong =

British Chinese actress and model

- Born: London, England
- Education: The Poor School
- Occupations: Actor, model
- Website: www.suan-li.com

Suan-Li Ong is a British actress and model. She is known for her roles in the NBC series Emerald City (2017) and the film The Host (2020).

== Early life ==
Ong was born in London, England. She speaks English and Cantonese, and is of Southeast Asian heritage. She trained at The Poor School.

== Career ==
=== Modelling ===
Ong began her modelling career at the age of 14 with Storm Model Management and continues to model to this day along with her acting. She appeared in Afi Magazine's September 2017 webitorial feature entitled “Kaleidoscope”. She provided the digital model of Angel, a character in NaturalMotion's 2016 CSR Racing sequel, CSR2; a member of the Nu Fangz crew who players compete against to win her car. Prior to that Suan-Li appeared on the Volume One cover of Scorpio Jin magazine in the September 2015 issue.

=== Acting ===
Ong is a trained croupier, having worked in London's West End and Mayfair, which she used in the production of the James Bond film Skyfall.

Ong appeared in an episode of the Crackle crime series Snatch as Maggie Xiang.

== Filmography ==
=== Film ===
Year	Title	Role	Ref.
2011	My So Called Life Sentence	Verity (Japanese Prisoner)	
2012	Skyfall	Head Croupier	
2017	Justice League	Lex Luthor's Guard	
2019	Dumbo	Fringe Girl Dancer	
2020	The Host	Jun Hui	
2021	Well Done Baby	Joanna	
2021	The Petticoat Duel	Meng / Eliza	
2021	Zack Snyder's Justice League	Lex's Guard	

=== Television ===
Year	Title	Role	Notes	Ref.
2010	Spooks	Teng-Mei Zen	Episode: #9.6	
2015	Strike Back	Fish Girl	Episode: #5.5	
2017	Emerald City	Isabel	3 episodes	
2017	Snatch	Maggie Xiang	Episode 1x04: Across the Pond	

=== Shorts ===
Year	Title	Role	Ref.
2010	Schreiber	Actress	
2012	You and Me Now	Shoko	
2013	Korean Food	Waitress	

=== Video games ===
Year	Title	Role	Notes
2016	CSR Racing 2	Angel	model for digital character
