= Blind Loves =

- Directed by: Juraj Lehotský
- Release date: May 2008 (Cannes Film Festival)
- Running time: 77 minutes
- Country: Slovakia
- Language: Slovakian

Blind Loves (Slovak: Slepé lásky) is a 2008 Slovak film directed by Juraj Lehotský. It was Slovakia’s official submission for the 2009 Academy Award for Best Foreign Language Film.

== Reception ==
CineMagazine rated the documentary 4 stars.
