= Martijn van Nellestijn =

Dutch film director (born 1978)

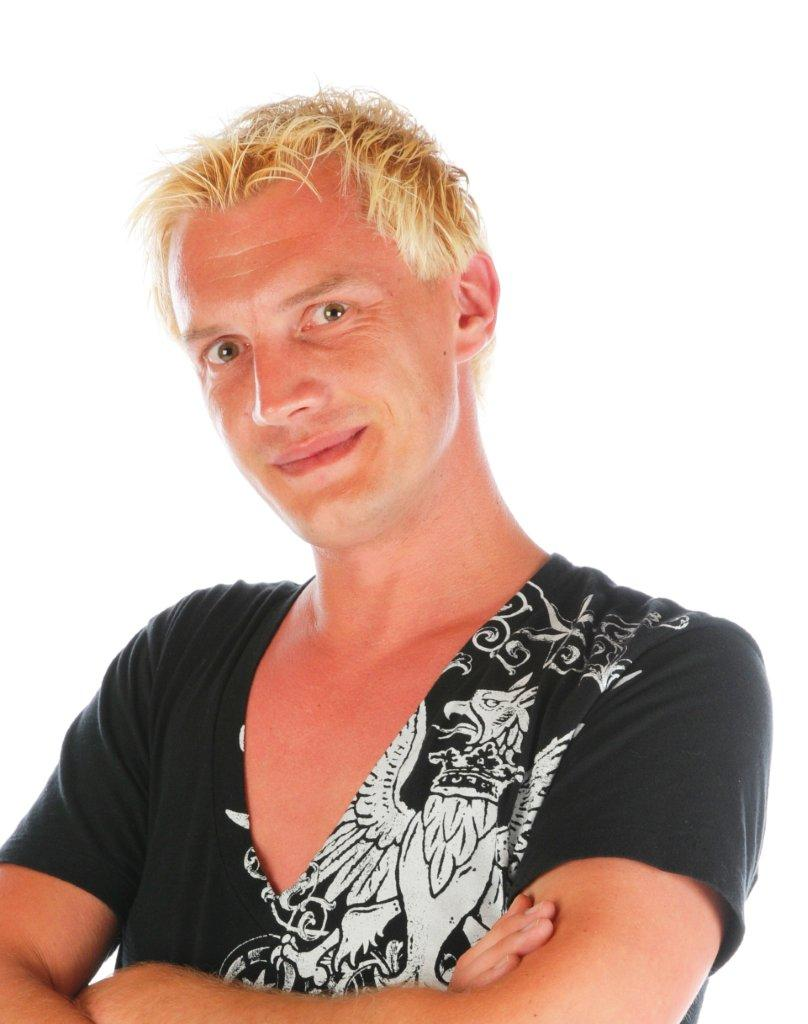
- Martijn van Nellestijn (2011)
- Born: Martijn Jacob van Nellestijn; 6 February 1978 (age 48); Rhenen, Netherlands

Martijn Jacob van Nellestijn (born 6 March 1978) is a Dutch film director and producer, known for making Sinterklaas films

== Selected filmography ==
- 2008: Sinterklaas en het Geheim van het Grote Boek
- 2019: De Brief voor Sinterklaas
