= Thomas W. Gabrielsson =

Swedish actor

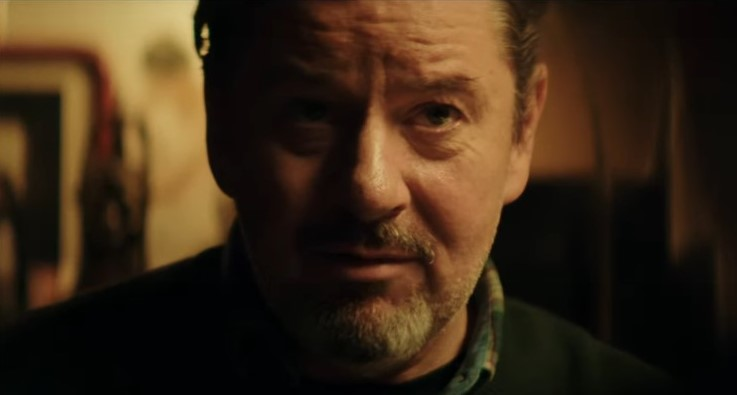
- Born: Thomas Waern Gabrielsson; 29 June 1963 (age 62); Gothenburg, Sweden
- Occupation: Actor

Thomas Waern Gabrielsson (born 29 June 1963) is a Swedish actor, active in Sweden and Denmark. He was born in Gothenburg.

== Stage career ==
In 1998, Gabrielsson performed solo in the 70-minute monologue dramatisation of the novel The Evil at the Theatre La Balance in Vanløse.

== Filmography (selected) ==
- En Kærlighedshistorie (aka: Dogme # 21) (2001)
- Rejseholdet (TV series) (2001–2002)
- Rembrandt (2003)
- Forsvar (TV series) (2003)
- Ørnen (TV series) (2004)
- Voksne Mennesker (2005)
- Oskar og josefine (2005)
- Wallander - Fotografen (TV series) (2006)
- Nynne (TV series) (2006)
- Hipp Hipp - Itzhaks Julevangelium (TV series) (2006)
- Cecilie (2007)
- POP (2007)
- Arn – The Knight Templar (2007)
- A Royal Affair (2012)
- Tomgang (TV series) (2014)
- The Last Kingdom (TV series) 2015 as Guthrum
- The Truth Will Out (2018) as Temo Björkman
- Domino (2019)
- Denmark (2020)
- The Promised Land (2023) as Bondo

== See also ==
- List of Swedish actors
