= Eva van de Wijdeven =

Dutch actress (born 1985)

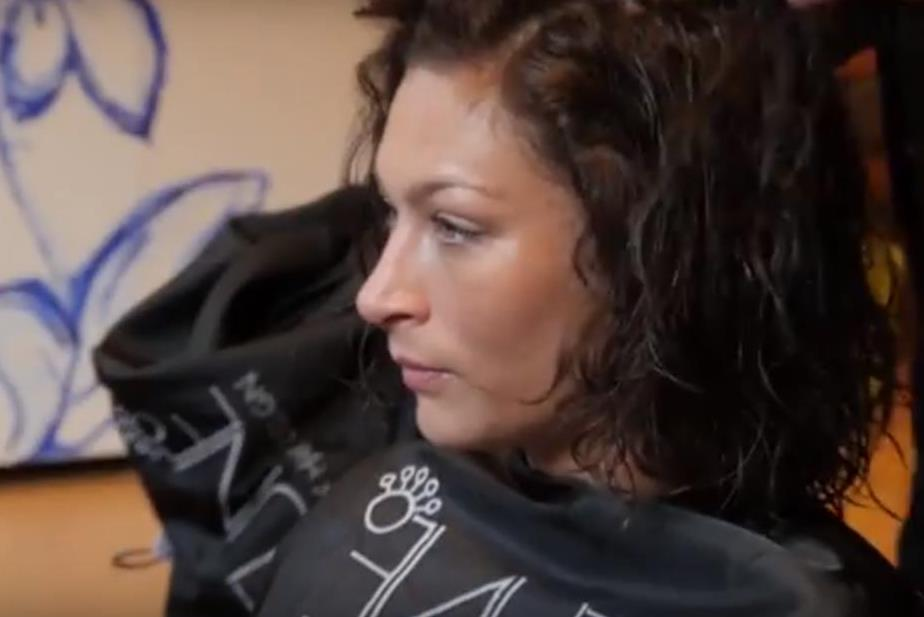
- Born: 24 February 1985 (age 41); Goirle, Netherlands
- Occupation: Actress
- Years active: 2002–present

Eva van de Wijdeven (born 24 February 1985) is a Dutch actress.

== Career ==
Van de Wijdeven attended the general special school De Werkplaats Kindergemeenschap in Bilthoven. She performed with the youth group Domenica of De Paardenkathedraal, after which she was invited to audition for a new NPS series, Dunya & Desie. She rose to prominence in 2002 with the lead role of Desie.

In 2005 she appeared in De Vader, a play by De Paardenkathedraal and Paula Bangels, and also had a role in the twelve-part drama series Vuurzee by VARA. In 2006, Van de Wijdeven appeared in the stage adaptation of the film Paris, Texas, directed by Paula Bangels, and also starred in the television film Escort.

In 2008, the film Dunya & Desie in Morocco was released, in which Van de Wijdeven once again appeared in the role of Desie.

From 2011 to 2016, Van de Wijdeven appeared as Eva van Amstel in the drama series A'dam – E.V.A., produced by NTR, VARA, and VPRO. Between 2014 and 2017, she played the role of Frederica "Freddy" Hendriks in the drama series Celblok H. In 2017, she starred in the lead role of Victoria Kramer in the drama series De mannentester, based on the novel of the same name by Heleen van Royen.

In 2021, Van de Wijdeven was one of the contestants in the 21st season of the RTL 4 program Expeditie Robinson. She was the second contestant eliminated and finished in 25th place.

In February 2024, Van de Wijdeven appeared alongside Holly Mae Brood in the lead role of Patty Brard in the Videoland series PATTY. She also played a role in the 2024 film De Mannenmaker directed by Jamel Aattache.

== Personal life ==
From 2007 to 2009, Van de Wijdeven was in a relationship with actor Tygo Gernandt, who she met on the set of Dunya & Desie in Morocco. In 2019 she began a relationship with Amsterdam entrepreneur Steven ten Bruggencate, and they had a son in May 2020.
