= Volcano High Prelude =

2001 manhwa by Ahn Chul-jung and Kim Hwan

- Cover, Volcano High Prelude volume 1 (Media Blasters edition)

화산고 Pre Story RR: Hwasango Pre Story MR: Hwasan'go Pre Story
- Genre: Humor/comedy, martial arts
- Author: Ahn Chul-jung
- Illustrator: Kim Hwan
- English publisher: (United States) Media Blasters
- Original run: 2001
- Volumes: 1

Volcano High Prelude (aka Volcano High Origin; Korean: 화산고 Pre Story) is a manhwa, set before the 2001 film Volcano High that details the events that occur before Kim Kyung-soo arrives. This however, does not required to be read before seeing the movie. The manhwa was written by Ahn Chul-jung and illustrated by Kim Hwan. It was distributed in the United States by Media Blasters.

== Overview ==
The schools have fallen and the teachers no longer have control. One teacher, Jang Oh-ja, arrives at Volcano High. Other than making Jang Hak-sa angry he took the job of principal, Oh-ja is rumored to carry the Teachers Memorandum; a mythical item that can make the wielder Number One of the Martial Arts Academies. The student body soon become aware and vie for the position of Number One.

Meanwhile, a group of rogue teachers are hoping to use the power of Lightning & Thunder to instill powers to another. However, their plans go wrong when the Lightning & Thunder misses and strikes a little boy instead. When Kim Kyung-soo is struck, the teachers don't expect him to live. They advised Kyung-soo's father that if he should live, he should not attend school because of the jealousy and hate he'll get. Years later, the teachers are aware that Kyung-soo lived and has received powers and they now want to expel him. He is set up and must transfer to the last school who'll accept him: Volcano High.

Oh-ja declares to the student body that classes will return, but they can also have their extracurricular activities as well; much to the dismay of Hak-sa. Fights break out and Ryang comes out on top for all of his. Hak-sa is disappointed with the student body, but is mildly happy that a new student wishes to transfer to Volcano High. Coming from Mt. Promotion, the Sole Crane of the Pine Forest Song Hak-rim wants to attend Volcano High. On his immediate arrival, every girl swoons over his good looks and natural charm. Hak-sa is shocked that Hak-rim attends Volcano High not for classes, but for inheriting the rumored Teachers Memorandum. Oh-ja laughs at the situation. Hak-rim vows to make Oh-ja tea every day to prove his determination.

Using his supernatural abilities, Hak-rim makes tea while most of the girls watch and fight over him. Yo-seon sees Hak-rim and immediately falls in love, while Chae-yi seems to have a crush on him. Hak-rim is sitting outside watching others play soccer. Jang Ryang suddenly approaches him and asks him about all the rumors of Hak-rim's strength. Hak-rim tells Ryang to step away because of his smell and that he's only there for the Teachers Memorandum. Ryang tells him he's looking for it as well. Hak-rim retorts that its above his head and he's too weak for it and should just quit. This angers Ryang, but instead of fighting, he offers to shake Hak-rim's hand and do one of his Endurance Determinations. Hak-rim grabs his hands and Ryang tries to bring him down. However, Hak-rim overpowers him and ends up throwing him away. Now angry, Ryang charges, but Hak-rim uses a supernatural blast of energy and sends him into the bathroom. Ryang, now wet and smelling worse, is humiliated by his defeat and even more humiliated when Hak-rim reveals that Ryang's real name is Dal-chun.

Yo-seon, along with Chae-yi visit a fortuneteller in hopes of finding out if Hak-rim will love her. The fortuneteller reveals that if Yo-seon folded 1,000 paper cranes with all her heart, Hak-rim will fall in love. Happily as ever, she takes 1,000 pieces of paper and prepares for crane folding. Meanwhile, Jang Ryang is showering off his stench and humiliation. Practicing punches and kicks, and he vows that he will be victorious against Song Hak-rim.

On the top of Mt. Evil, a group of five uncertified teachers are harnessing the power of Lightning & Thunder. Coming once every 1,000 years, they are hoping it can instill supernatural powers easier. When the lightning bolt misses and strikes something at the base of the mountain, the teachers are dumbfounded. Finding that it struck a little boy who was also near a tank of eels made them feel dumber. Mr. Ma, the leader, tells the young boy's father that there is a high chance he will die. If he doesn't, he should not attend school because of the jealousy that will rise from his powers. Mr. Ma remembers the young boy's name for later just in case he sees him: Kim Kyung-soo.

Years later, the Academy Five, the group of uncertified teachers, is called to a high school to discipline the student body. Mr. Ma is teaching math and is running through attendance. He comes the one name that shocks him: Kim Kyung-soo. Learning that he did indeed live, Mr. Ma is set on expelling him out of this high school and getting rid of Kyung-soo. His first tactic was using other students to attack Kyung-soo so he would use his powers. It succeeds, but it doesn't get him expelled. Kyung-soo is helping a female teacher move objects. From outside, Mr. Ma uses his abilities to lift the teacher's skirt up. She immediately slaps Kyung-soo and he was then expelled. Kyung-soo, now tired of moving, declares that he has to transfer yet again. Mr. Ma watches and silently says to himself that Kyung-soo will reach his grave very soon.

== Characters ==
- Kim Kyung-soo (translated as Gyung-soo Kim): A young man who was unwillingly given the powers of Lightning & Thunder. He was not expected to live, but he did. He had been kicked out of 9 Junior High schools and 5 High schools so far.
- Yoo Chae-yi (translated as Chei Yu): Leader of the Kendo team and former head of Ami; an all-girls Junior High. Her beauty captivates both men and women. Calm and wise, she doesn't let anything bother her. She seems to develop a crush on Song Hak-rim; unbeknownst to her loud companion So Yo-seon.
- So Yo-seon (translated as Yosun Soh): A new transfer student at Volcano High. Transferred for the sole reason of meeting good looking guys. Her wish is granted when she meets Song Hak-rim. She is ill-tempered and is willing to fight.
- Song Hak-rim: Another transfer student who comes to Volcano High to inherit the Teachers Memorandum. He taught himself everything and lived among the cranes in the forests for 7 years living on pine needles. Hence his nickname: Sole Crane of the Pine Forest.
- Jang Ryang: He formerly attended Heartless Jr. High, but was kicked out before going to Heartless High because of his wild nature. He comes to Volcano High to prove his strength.
- Shimma: The leader of the Rugby Team. He uses his words instead of fists to fight. He is brash and cocky when he firsts meet Jang Ryang.
- Jang Hak-sa: Former professor at Volcano High. Soon, he became Vice Principal after Jang Oh-ja was named Principal. He has had a strong distaste for Oh-ja because of his easy-going nature. He believes all students should be severely disciplined.
- Jang Oh-ja: The new principal of Volcano High. He lived with Elder Zarak for 17 years before returning. He has a laid-back attitude and tends to break wind a lot; much to the annoyance of Hak-sa. He is rumored to have brought the Teachers Memorandum to Volcano High with him.
- Mr. Ma: Leader of the Academy Five; a group of teachers who are uncertified. He prepared to have the Lightning & Thunder strike the Academy Five, but it missed and it instead hit Kim Kyung-soo. He is an evil man who plans to put more strict laws on students and teaching.

== Reception ==
Reviews have been mediocre to negative. Anime News Network deemed the two storylines "ridiculous" and shouldn't "be taken seriously". Anime On DVD states " Martial arts action fantasy with comedic elements around a vibrant energetic cast created a small but vocal base that would lead to the release of titles like Battle Vixens, Tenjo Tenge and to an extent Worst. Each title mentioned uses concepts initially used by Real Bout. Capturing action is key and sensationalizing the art in martial is critical. Now Volcano High tried to take these ideas and expand on them... But it has failed. Wait maybe the movie did not, but the manhwa has." Both reviews agreed that the art was decent to good, but the overuse of SD art was unnecessary and illogical. Both reviews however, praised the bonus extras contained in the manhwa.
