= The Color of Fame =

- The Color of Fame film poster
- Directed by: Alejandro Bellame
- Written by: Armando Coll; Alberto Gomez Diaz; Alejandro Bellame
- Starring: Elaiza Gil; Alberto Alifa; Miguel Ferrari
- Distributed by: Totem Films
- Release date: 7 February 2008
- Country: Venezuela
- Language: Spanish

The Color of Fame (Spanish: El tinte de la fama) is a 2008 Venezuelan drama film about a Marilyn Monroe poser and a transsexual who believes to be her reincarnation. The film was Venezuela's official submission for the 81st Annual Academy Awards for Best Foreign Language Film.

== Plot ==
Magaly (Elaiza Gil) enters a television contest looking for a Marilyn Monroe lookalike for a $25,000 prize. Her husband, Arturo (Alberto Arifa), believes is the best way to get through the financial crisis they are facing. As the challenge goes by, Magaly partners with Héctor (Miguel Ferrari) who believes to be the Monroe's reincarnation in a "third world transsexual man". She begins to lose her identity and follows the same downfall of the late actress.
