= Caroline De Bruijn =

Dutch actress (born 1962)

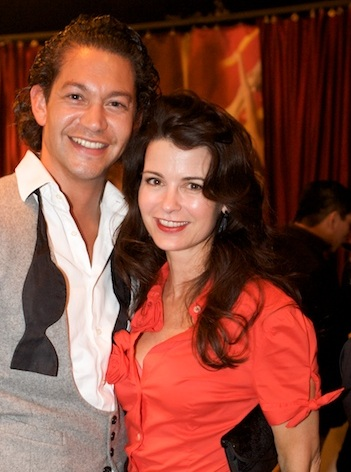
- Born: 31 July 1962 (age 63); Dordrecht, Netherlands
- Occupation: Actor
- Years active: 1990-present
- Known for: Goede tijden, slechte tijden

Caroline De Bruijn (born 31 July 1962) is a Dutch actress. She gained national fame through her longstanding role as Janine Elschot in the show Goede tijden, slechte tijden, which she has played since 1992.

== Career ==
De Bruijn was raised in Valkenswaard and Eindhoven. Since an early age she played piano and took ballet lessons. After obtaining her gymnasium-diploma she moved to Amsterdam at age 17. There she studied ballet at the National Ballet Academy and law at the University of Amsterdam. In 1986 she graduated in Dutch law. In the same period De Bruijn was also taking acting classes, and began taking roles in plays.

After taking guest roles on television shows like the comedy Ha, die Pa!, De Bruijn was cast in Goede tijden, slechte tijden in 1992. Her role as Janine Elschot became one of the most recognizable in the show. It was there that she met Erik de Vogel, playing the part of Ludo Martens, and they became romantic partners. On 29 July 2000 they had a daughter.

Since 2013 De Bruijn has produced and hosted a travel show named Romancing the Globe together with her partner de Vogel for RTL4. In the first episode they travelled to Morocco.

== Filmography ==
=== Television ===
- 12 steden, 13 ongelukken (1990)
- Goede tijden, slechte tijden (1992–present)
- Vreemde praktijken (1992)
- Ha, die pa! (1992)
- Romancing the globe (2013-present)
- Nieuwe tijden (2016)

=== Film ===
- The Wild Thornberrys Movie (Dutch version voice actor) (2002)
- Chicken Little (Dutch version voice actor) (2005)
- Don (2006)
- Hop ((Dutch version voice actor) (2011)
- Sneeuwwitje en de zeven kleine mensen (2014)
- Robinson Crusoe (Dutch version voice actor) (2016)
- First kiss (2018)
