= First Kiss (1998 film) =

1998 South Korean film

- Film poster
- Directed by: Kim Tae-kyun
- Written by: Park Jung-woo
- Produced by: Jeong Tae-won
- Starring: Ahn Jae-wook; Choi Ji-woo; Lee Geung-young; Yu Hye-jeong; Byun Woo-min
- Cinematography: Shin Ok-hyun
- Edited by: Ko Im-pyo
- Music by: Gang Ho-jeong
- Production company: Taewon Entertainment
- Release date: 3 October 1998
- Running time: 105 minutes
- Country: South Korea
- Language: Korean

First Kiss is a 1998 South Korean romantic comedy-drama film directed by Kim Tae-kyun and produced by Jeong Tae-won.

== Cast ==
- Ahn Jae-wook
- Choi Ji-woo
- Lee Geung-young
- Yu Hye-jeong
- Byun Woo-min
- Jang Dong-gun
- Jin Jae-yeong
- Shin Cheol-jin as Elevator man
- Kim Bo-sung
- Ko So-young
- Lee Jong-soo
- Lee Young-ae
