= Roel Dirven =

Dutch actor

- Born: 15 February 1988 (age 38); Hoeven, the Netherlands
- Education: Fontys Hogeschool voor de Kunsten
- Years active: 2010-present

Roel Dirven (born 15 February 1988) is a Dutch actor. Born in Hoeven, Dirven moved to Tilburg for his education at Fontys Hogeschool voor de Kunsten. He gained popularity among the public from his role as Raphael Salamons in the series Het Huis Anubis en de Vijf van het Magische Zwaard and from being the voiceover of Leon Vargas in Violetta. He also starred in two different roles in the musical Soldier of Orange in the period 2013-2016.

He had his international breakthrough after landing a role in the HBO Max movie The Mopes (2021). Since then, he also started appearing in English-language movies. In addition to his acting career, Dirven has appeared in commercials, has read audiobooks, has lent his voice in movies and since 2015 has written two books in collaboration with Ryanne Veldkamp.

== Biography ==
Roel Dirven was born in the town of Hoeven, but moved to Tilburg. During high school, he already started having experience with singing by being part in school musicals. He first entered the theater world by being part of the Max Mini theater group in the town of Etten-Leur. In addition to singing, he also specialized in singing and dancing with the group. He then started his university education at the Fontys Hogeschool voor de Kunsten in the direction of Musical Theater. In 2007, he had a role in the short movie Renée as part of a 48 Hour Film Project Utrecht.

In 2010, he made his TV debut in the role of Raphael Salomons in the series Het Huis Anubis en de Vijf van het Magische Zwaard. During an interview, Dirven shared how it was "surreal" to have the experience at the time as he could learn all about acting and singing and break through in the world of television. Following the wide success of the series, he also starred in the movies Het Huis Anubis: De Vijf en de Toorn van Balor en Het Huis Anubis en de terugkeer van Sibuna! playing the same role. Additionally, he also starred in the theater productions Anubis en het Mysterie van het Verborgen Symbool en Het Huis Anubis en het Geheim van de Verloren Ziel.

In the period between 2011 and 2015, Dirven was the voiceover actor in numerous films and television series, including Victorious, Hotel 13 en The Evermoor Chronicles. He also lent his voice to other productions by Disney Plus, Netflix, Nickelodeon en NPO. He has also worked as an audiobook reader and translator. In the period between 2013 and 2015, he starred as the Jew Bram Goudsmid in the musical production Soldier of Orange. He first started in the show in January 2013, being part of the ensemble, before he was promoted to the role of Bram in August 2013. In the season 2016-2017 he played the role of Anton Roover in the same production. In the period 2017-2018, he played in De Woef Side Story of Theater Rotterdam. He also appeared in several TV shows and films as a guest actor, including Gooische Vrouwen 2 (2014), De Zevende Hemel (2016), Queer Amsterdam (2016), De Spa (2017), Next (2018), Spangas op Zomervakantie (2018), Flikken Maastricht (2022), Bodem (2022), Just a Girl (2023), Bureau Raampoort and Jeuk.

Since 5 september 2018, Dirven played the role of Flo Wagenaar on the soap opera broadcast on RTL 4 titled Goede tijden, slechte tijden. He had two auditions for the role before being accepted, including one with fellow actor Ferry Doedens whose love interest he played in the movie (character Lucas Sanders). He had previously acted in the soap opera twice in 2011 and 2016, each time playing a guest role. He played in the series until the following year, with his last appearance being on 2 May 2019. In 2019, he starred in the Christmas-movie De Brief voor Sinterklaas in the role of Carlo Cadeaux. The same year, he acted as the protagonist's homosexual love interest in the music video "Tand Om Tand" by Jeroen Dekkers, released on 3 July 2019.

In 2016, he appeared in several commercials by Gamma and in the beginning of 2024, he had a campaign for Zonneplan.

=== International breakthrough ===
In 2021, Roel had his international breakthrough with the role of Mat Benvenuti in the HBO Max movie The Mopes. As part of his preparation for the role, he moved to Berlin, Germany where he also learnt how to play the guitar and followed classes in American English and German.

In November 2022, Roel starred in the English-language short film Heaven on Earth. The movie was critically acclaimed and won second runner-up Best Film at the International Four Points Festival. Additionally, it won prizes in the categories Best Acting Ensemble, Best Cinematography en Best Sound Design. In 2023, he was part of the short film Just a Girl directed by Frank Marchand.

In 2024, he starred in the lead role as Adam in the movie Lost in the Waves directed by Joss berlioux and Franck Marchand. In 2025, he appeared in the short French-language movie Le Secret De Martha (Martha's Secret) written and directed by Pierre Noguéras and Paul Parent.

=== Book-writing ===
In addition to acting, Dirven has also ventured into writing scenarios and books. In September 2025, his first novel, written together with Ryanne Veldkamp, titled Tot op de bodem (To the Bottom) was released. On 25 February 2026, he released another book, titled Tot het Uiterste, again co-written with Veldkamp and a continuation of their previous book.

== Private life ==
Roel Dirven's mother tongue is Dutch. In addition to it, he also speaks English, German and French.

== Singles ==
- "De Vijf Zintuigen" (2010), opening song from Het Huis Anubis en de Vijf van het Magische Zwaard.
