= Bartho Braat =

Dutch actor (born 1950)

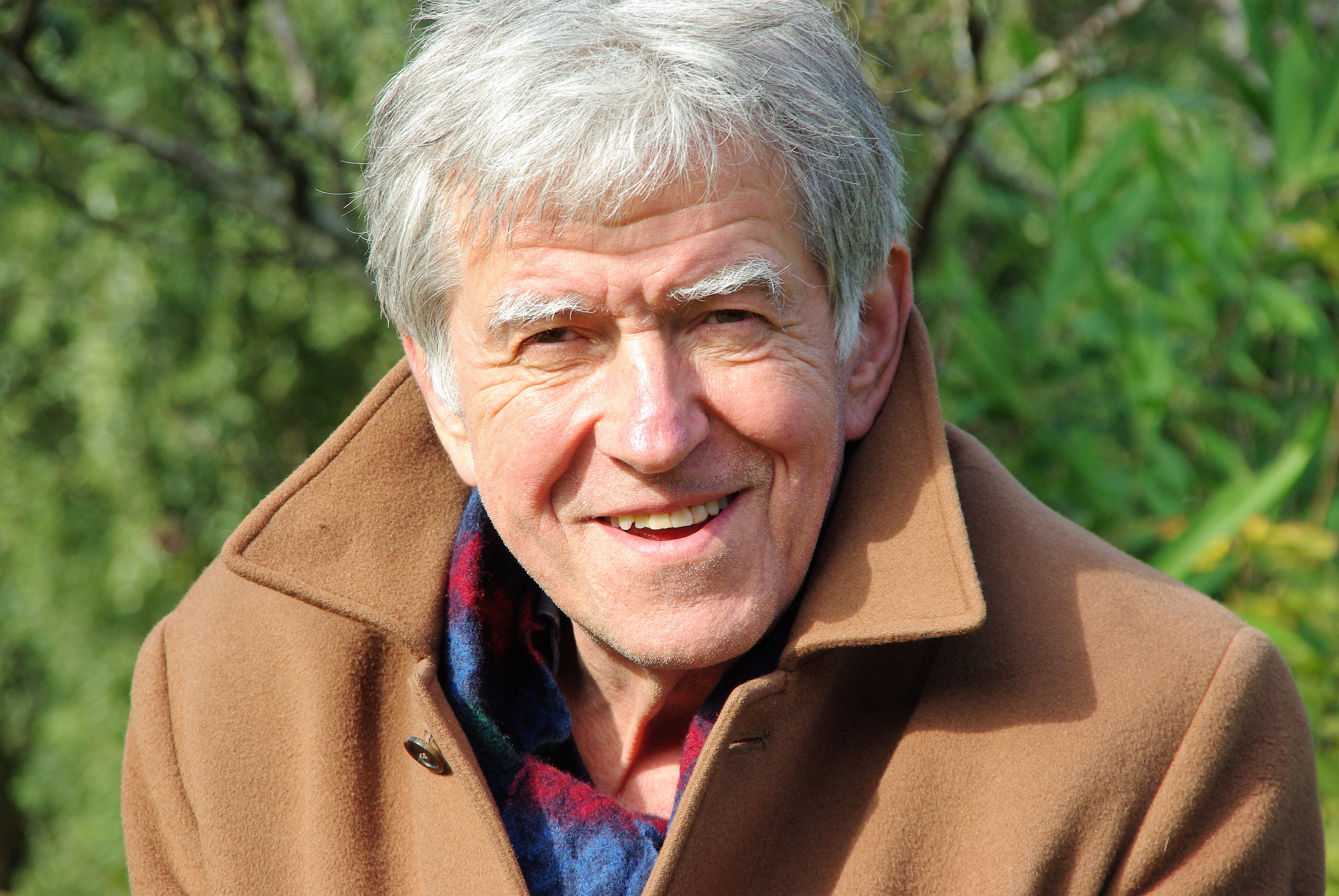
- Born: 17 August 1950 (age 76); Leiden, Netherlands
- Occupation: Actor
- Years active: 1984-present
- Known for: Goede tijden, slechte tijden

Bartho Braat (born 17 August 1950) is a Dutch actor. He gained national fame through his longstanding role as Jef Alberts in the show Goede tijden, slechte tijden, which he played from 1991 until 2016.

== Career ==
Bartho Braat was born in Leiden to archeologist Wouter C. Braat and was raised in Oegstgeest. After obtaining his Gymnasium-diploma he intended to study History and Theater at the University of Amsterdam. In 1980 he briefly enrolled in the Academy of Theatre and Dance, studying directing. However he decided to become a full-time actor instead.

Braat made his debut on Dutch television in 1984's Oma Fladder.

In 1985 and 1986 he had guest appearances in the VARA-show Zeg 'ns Aaa, and a guest role in the 1986 television show Het wassende water. In 1987 he gained national recognition as the father in the McDonald's ad Ze zei meneer tegen me.

After a small role in the 1986 film Mama is Boos! there followed guest roles throughout the 1980s in the shows In naam van Oranje, Medisch Centrum West, Spijkerhoek, and Adriaen Brouwer.

In 1990 Braat was given a small role in Goede tijden, slechte tijden, and in 1991 he was given a recurring role as Jeff Alberts, one of the show's most recognizable characters. He stayed on the show until 2016, when he announced his departure after 25 years.

== Filmography ==
=== Television ===
- Oma Fladder (1984)
- Zeg 'ns Aaa - Ben (1985, 1986)
- Adriaen Brouwer - Rol onbekend (1986)
- Het wassende water - Aai (1986)
- De Papegaai - Owner parrot (1988)
- Medisch Centrum West - Gerrit Hiemstra (1988, 1990)
- Rust roest - (1989)
- Commercial McDonald's - "Ze zei "meneer" tegen me". (1989) - Father
- Twaalf steden, dertien ongelukken - Chef (Episode Leeuwarden, 1990)
- Spijkerhoek - Doctor (1990)
- Goede tijden, slechte tijden - Neil van Dongen (1990)
- Goede tijden, slechte tijden - Jef Alberts (1991–2016)
- De Legende van de Bokkenrijders - Meneer Bree (1994)
- Baantjer - Frank Stalknecht (Episode De Cock en de moord met 43 messen, 1997)
- Zie Ze Vliegen - Himself (2010)
- Expeditie Robinson – Himself, candidate (2016)
- Goede tijden, slechte tijden – Jef Alberts & Sinterklaas (2016–2019 • 2021)
- De Pepernoten Club - Sinterklaas (2018–present)

=== Film ===
- Overvallers in de dierentuin (1984) - Tractor-driver Piet
- Mama is boos! (1986) - Donald
- De ratelrat (1987) - Kolonel Marechaussee
- Goede tijden, slechte tijden: De reünie (1998) - Jef Alberts
- Vicious Circle (1999) - Rensenbrink
- Jef (2006) - Jef Alberts
- Sinterklaas en de Verdwenen Pakjesboot (2009) - Berend Boef
- Joris en Boris en het Geheim van de Tempel (2012) - Grudo
- Het genootschap van Mendacium (2012) - President of the United States
- Fabula (2016) - short film - Etienne van den Bemt
- De Vloek van Lughus (2021) - Rolf

=== Theater ===
- Stevie
- De Aanslag
- Escolette Ay Ay Ay
- Edida
- Op glad ijs
- Een wonderbaarlijke nacht
- Johanna de Waanzinnige
- De Burggravin van Vergi
- La Cage Aux Folles
- Taxi Taxi
- Prettig Gestoord
- Toms Magische Speelgoedwinkel
- Gare de Lyon
- De dementie van Jet en Harrie
