= De Mannenmaker =

2024 Dutch film directed by Jamel Aattache

- Directed by: Jamel Aattache
- Written by: René Molenaar; Michiel Peereboom
- Based on: De Mannenmaker by Petra Kruijt
- Produced by: Paul Ruven; Jamel Aattache
- Starring: Katja Schuurman; Eva van de Wijdeven; Leo Alkemade; Georgina Verbaan
- Cinematography: Christiaan Cats
- Edited by: Jelle Kuijpers
- Music by: Jeffrey van Rossum
- Production companies: Brabant Films; Talent United Film & TV
- Distributed by: Independent Films
- Release date: 17 October 2024
- Country: Netherlands
- Language: Dutch

De Mannenmaker is a 2024 Dutch romantic comedy film directed by Jamel Aattache.

Katja Schuurman, Leo Alkemade and Eva van de Wijdeven play roles in the film. The film finished in 26th place in the list of best visited Dutch films of 2024. The film is based on the book of the same name by Petra Kruijt.

Principal photography began in September 2023.
