= Kim Tae-kyun (director) =

South Korean film director (born 1960)

- Born: July 17, 1960 (age 66); Seoul, South Korea
- Education: Hankuk University of Foreign Studies - Political Science; Korean Academy of Film Arts
- Occupations: Film director, screenwriter, producer
- Years active: 1987-present

Korean name
- Hangul: 김태균
- Hanja: 金泰均
- RR: Gim Taegyun
- MR: Kim T'aegyun

Kim Tae-kyun (Korean: 김태균; born June 17, 1960) is a South Korean film director. Kim wrote and directed Volcano High (2001) and Temptation of Wolves (2004). He also directed The Adventures of Mrs. Park (1996), First Kiss (1998), A Millionaire's First Love, Crossing (2008), Higanjima (2010), A Barefoot Dream (2010), Innocent Thing (2014), and Bad Sister (2014). Crossing and A Barefoot Dream were selected as the South Korean entries for Best Foreign Language Film at the 81st and 83rd Academy Awards, but neither made the final shortlist.

== Filmography ==
- 관계 (short film, 1987) - lighting
- Moon (short film, 1987) - credits
- Stopping for a While (short film, 1987) - director
- My Love, My Bride (1990) - line producer
- As You Please (1992) - executive producer
- First Kiss (1993) - line producer
- Bitter and Sweet (1995) - executive producer
- The Adventures of Mrs. Park (1996) - director
- First Kiss (1998) - director
- Julseogi (short film, 1999) - director
- Volcano High (2001) - director, screenwriter
- At 2 O'clock (short film, 2003; included in the omnibus Twentidentity) - director
- Temptation of Wolves (2004) - director, screenwriter
- I'm OK (short film, 2005; included in the omnibus 3 Colors Love Story) - director
- A Millionaire's First Love (2006) - director
- Crossing (2008) - director
- Higanjima (2010) - director
- A Barefoot Dream (2010) - director, producer, script editor
- The Dearest (2012) - production adviser
- Sympathy for Us (2012) - production adviser
- Choked (2012) - production adviser
- Mirage (2012) - production adviser
- When Winter Screams (2013) - production and screenplay consultant
- Your Time Is Up (2013) - production consultant
- INGtoogi: The Battle of Internet Trolls (2013) - production consultant
- Innocent Thing (2014) - director, executive producer
- A Pharisee (2014) - producer
- Bad Sister (2014) - director
- Beastie Girls (2017) - producer

== Awards ==
- 2008 Foreign Press Promotion Award, Film category (Crossing)
- 2008 18th Korean Catholic Mass Communication Award (Crossing)
- 2008 16th Chunsa Film Art Awards: Best Director (Crossing)
- 2010 19th Golden Rooster and Hundred Flowers Awards: Best Director of a Foreign Film (A Barefoot Dream)
