= Maryam Hassouni =

Dutch actress (born 1985)

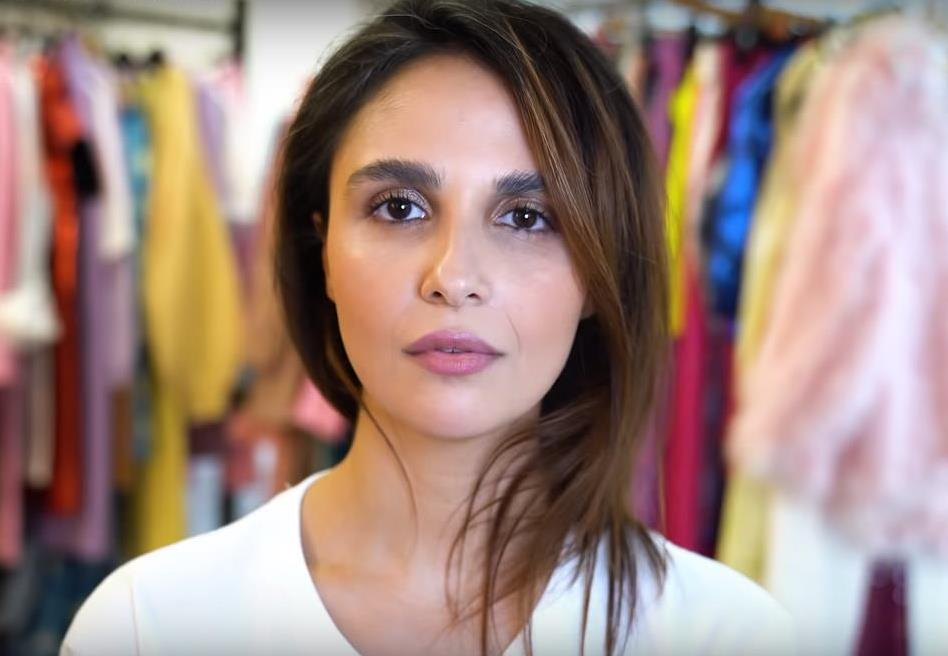
- Hassouni in 2020
- Born: 21 September 1985 (age 40); Amsterdam, Netherlands
- Occupation: Actress
- Years active: 2002–present

Maryam Hassouni (born 21 September 1985) is a Dutch writer and former actress. In 2006, she won an International Emmy Award for her role in Offers (2005).

== Early life, family and education ==
Hassouni was born on 21 September 1985 in Amsterdam to Moroccan parents, who had immigrated to the Netherlands a few years prior; she has two younger siblings.

Hassouni received her high school diploma in 2003. She studied museology until 2005, then took law at the Free University in Amsterdam but failed the course.

== Career ==
In 2002, she began her acting career in the titular role of Dunya El-Beneni in the television series Dunya and Desi, which was nominated for an International Emmy Award for Children and Young People in 2004 and again in 2005.

In 2006, she won the International Emmy Award for Best Performance by an Actress for her portrayal of Laila al Gatawi in the 2005 Dutch TV film Offers.

In 2022, Hassouni published the book Wat de fak (ISBN 9789403110929) through De Bezige Bij. It describes her experiences with what she identifies as structural sexism and racism in the film industry. She also announced her retirement from acting until those issues are addressed.

== Selected filmography ==
=== Film ===
List of film appearances, with year, title, and role shown
Year	Title	Role	Notes
2007	Kicks	Aaliyah	
2008	Anubis en het Pad der 7 Zonden	Charlotte de Beaufort	
2008	Dunya and Desi	Dunya El-Beneni	
2012	Manslaughter	Amira	
2013	Soof	Najat	
2016	Soof 2	Najat	
2020	The Host	Vera Tribbe	
2021	Meskina	Leyla Idrissi	

=== Television ===
List of television appearances, with year, title, and role shown
Year	Title	Role	Notes
2002–04	Dunya and Desi	Dunya El-Beneni	19 episodes
2005	Offers	Laila al Gatawi	Television film
2016	Flikken Maastricht	Rebecca Meeuws	1 episode
2016	Flikken Rotterdam	Lieve Jansons	1 season

== Awards ==
- International Emmy Award for Best Performance by an Actress (2006) in Offers
