= Crossing (2008 film) =

- Theatrical poster
- Hangul: 크로싱
- RR: Keurosing
- MR: K'ŭrosing
- Directed by: Kim Tae-kyun
- Written by: Lee Yu-jin
- Produced by: Patrick D. Choi
- Starring: Cha In-pyo; Sin Myeong-cheol
- Cinematography: Jeong Han-cheol
- Edited by: Ko Im-pyo
- Music by: Kim Tae-seong
- Distributed by: Vantage Holdings
- Release date: June 26, 2008 (South Korea)
- Running time: 107 minutes
- Country: South Korea
- Languages: Korean; Mandarin; German; English; Mongolian
- Budget: US$5.4 million

Crossing (also known as Keurosing) is a 2008 South Korean drama film directed by Kim Tae-kyun. It was selected as South Korea's submission to the 81st Academy Awards for Best Foreign Language Film. The film follows the journey of a North Korean man as he illegally leaves the country to find medicine for his sick wife, portraying the many hardships of the average North Korean citizen. The film had 907,255 admissions in South Korea.

The politics of North Korea in this film are left behind and are mainly in the background. Instead it concentrates more on the life of the average North Korean, such as the hardship in an impoverished state and the fear of getting caught and being persecuted in North Korea. Subtle themes include religion, which runs through the film, as Yong Soo hopes that his son comes back safely, as well as football which is a way in connecting the North Koreans to the outside world.

== Plot ==
A North Korean father and husband decides to illegally cross into China to buy medicine for his pregnant wife, who is suffering from tuberculosis. Once he crosses into China, however, he realizes that it's not as easy as thought. He starts working as an illegal immigrant under the constant threat of capture by Chinese authorities and deportation back to North Korea. He eventually finds his way to South Korea by entering the German Consulate-General in Shenyang, China. Meanwhile, his wife dies, leaving their son homeless and wandering trying to find a way back to his father. Scenes switch between those of the father who is outside North Korea trying to find medicine, and those of the son, who ends up homeless and tries to defect also.

== Cast ==
- Cha In-pyo as Kim Yong-soo, the main protagonist and the father.
- Sin Myeong-cheol as Kim Joon, the son of Kim Yong-soo.
- Seo Young-hwa as Yong-soo's wife
- Jung In-gi as Sang-cheol, friend of Yong-soo's who eventually gets sent to a labor camp, for smuggled goods.
- Joo Da-young as Mi-seon, daughter of Sang-cheol, friend of Joon.
- Tae In-ho

== Awards and nominations ==
2008 Buil Film Awards

- Nomination - Best New Actor - Sin Myeong-cheol

2008 Blue Dragon Film Awards

- Nomination - Best Film
- Nomination - Best Director - Kim Tae-kyun

2008 Korean Film Awards

- Nomination - Best Art Direction - Kim Hyeon-ok
- Nomination - Best New Actor - Sin Myeong-cheol

== Controversy ==
Shortly after the film was released it became embroiled in controversy, as it was accused of plagiarism by Lee Kwang Hoon. He argued that the film was derived from a screenplay titled "The Conditions of Human" that Lee had written, based on the story of North Korean defector Yoo Sang-joon. Lee's lawyer also said that director Lee and Yoo had signed a contract to make a film about Yoo's life, which had been in preparation for three years. The lawyer claimed that a court injunction was sought because director Kim had not discussed the matter with director Lee, although Kim had known about the existence of a screenplay about Yoo. The request for an injunction applied to all theater presentations, as well as DVDs and internet videos. Vantage Holdings, the distributor of Crossing, countered the accusation by saying that the director nor the film company had violated Lee's copyright and added that they were looking into taking legal measures themselves.

Prior to the controversy, the film was seen as a frontrunner for South Korea's submission to the 81st Academy Awards for Best Foreign Language Film. However, after the request for injunction, the Korean Film Council stated that it would select another submission if Crossing was found guilty when the issue came to court. In the end, the film was submitted to the 81st Academy Awards for Best Foreign Language Film, but was not nominated for the award.

== See also ==
- Human rights in North Korea
- North Korean defectors
