= De Brief voor Sinterklaas =

2019 Dutch film directed by Lucio Messercola

- Film poster
- Directed by: Lucio Messercola
- Written by: Trui van de Brug; Martijn van Nellestijn; Lucio Messercola
- Produced by: Martijn van Nellestijn; Mark van Roon; Marcella Westen
- Cinematography: Goof de Koning
- Production company: Messercola Drama
- Distributed by: Paradiso Entertainment
- Release date: 9 October 2019 (Netherlands)
- Running time: 81 minutes
- Country: Netherlands
- Language: Dutch

De Brief voor Sinterklaas (Dutch for: The Letter for Sinterklaas) is a 2019 Dutch film directed by Lucio Messercola.

== Plot ==
Sinterklaas is in need of more Black Petes (Zwarte Pieten) to assist him with the annual feast of Sinterklaas. He decides to hold auditions to recruit more Black Petes during a "Black Pete day" ("Pietendag"). Sem sends a letter to Sinterklaas hoping to become a Black Pete but Mammie and Huibert Jan are plotting to sabotage the day.

== Cast ==
- Bram van der Vlugt as Sinterklaas
- Pamela Teves as Mammie
- Edo Brunner as Huibert Jan
- Lieke van Lexmond as Anna
- Bo Burger as Sem
- Jelle de Jong as David
- Erik de Vogel as himself
- Chris Tates as Hugo Hogepief
- Wesley Mutsaars as Paco Post
- Martijn van Nellestijn as Postbode
- Roel Dirven as Carlo Cadeaux
- Maaike Bakker as Patty Pepernoot
- Aad van Toor as Adriaan
- Joshua Albano as Benny Taai Taai
- Aaron Groeneveld as Vrachtpiet
- Jimmy van Schaik as Dex

== Production ==
Filming concluded on 7 March 2019. One of the filming locations for the film was the Dutch town of Purmerend.
