= The Host (2020 film) =

2020 Dutch mystery crime thriller film

- Directed by: Andy Newbery
- Screenplay by: Finola Geraghty; Brendan Bishop; Laurence Lamers
- Story by: Laurence Lamers
- Produced by: Zachary Weckstein
- Starring: Maryam Hassouni; Mike Beckingham; Dougie Poynter; Nigel Barber; Suan-Li Ong; Togo Igawa
- Cinematography: Oona Menges
- Edited by: Ot Louw; Julien Leloup
- Music by: Wan Pin Chu
- Production company: Pearl Pictures Productions
- Distributed by: Vertical Entertainment
- Release dates: 6 January 2020 (London); 13 October 2020 (The Netherlands)
- Running time: 102 minutes
- Country: Netherlands
- Language: English
- Budget: €970,000

The Host is a 2020 English-language mystery crime thriller film produced in the Netherlands by Pearl Pictures Productions. The film is directed by Andy Newbery and produced by Zachary Weckstein, both of whom are making their feature film debut. The Host is the story of a London banker who seizes the opportunity to change his mundane life by taking a risk with his employer's money. A series of events leads him to travel to Amsterdam, where all is not as it seems. Driven by power players, drugs, seduction, and violence, the film portrays a deadly game of choice and consequence.

== Plot ==
Robert Atkinson, a bank employee, is left feeling worthless after an afternoon fling with his boss's wife. The same day, he closes a lucrative deal with a bank client, placing the money in a safety deposit box. Robert plans to use the money to turn his life around but he succumbs to one of his various vices instead, and proceeds to gamble all the money away, while borrowing even more. Unaware that he is under surveillance, Robert is approached by a stranger, Lau Hoi Ho, at a gambling hall. Ho offers to pay off his debts, under the condition that Robert agrees to transport a briefcase from London to Amsterdam. Finding himself in a desperate situation and attracted by the offer, Robert agrees to the deal.

US DEA agent Herbert Summers, who is seated next to Robert on his flight to Amsterdam, reveals his true identity and discloses that he is on the trail of Triad leader Lau Hoi Ho. Robert is placed in a compromised position and forced to assist the DEA in Ho's capture. After arriving at his hotel, Robert finds out that it is overbooked and his room is no longer available. The hotel manager, Gerrie, summons a favour from Vera Tribbe, who happens to have a room available nearby. Robert and Gerrie proceed to Vera's house, unaware of being followed by the Chinese mafia. After settling in, Robert makes Vera's acquaintance and they seem to develop a fondness for each other. From here, events spiral out of control. Robert goes missing and his brother Steve goes searching for him. DEA agent Summers is enmeshed in the shadowy waterways of Amsterdam as he follows the thread of his investigation to the story's final denouement.

== Cast ==
- Maryam Hassouni as Vera Tribbe
- Mike Beckingham as Robert Atkinson
- Dougie Poynter as Steve Atkinson
- Nigel Barber as Herbert Summers
- Suan-Li Ong as Jun Hui
- Togo Igawa as Lau Hoi Ho
- Daniël Boissevain as Albert Tribbe
- Tom Wu as Yong
- Derek Jacobi as Dr. Hobson
- Jeroen Krabbé as Vera's father
- Fabian Jansen as Chief Vanderbilt
- Reinout Bussemaker as Gerrie
- Dominic Keating as Benjamin
- Margo Stilley as Sarah
- Ruby Turner as herself
- Logan Wong as Li
- Niki Simone as Patricia
- Liv Boeree as Ms. Gueller
- Christina Tam as Yu Yan
- Jon Xue Zhang as Bodyguard
- Inge de Bruijn as herself

== Production ==
Principal photography on The Host began in March 2018 on location in a historic Amsterdam canal mansion. The film was shot in numerous locations around London and Amsterdam over five weeks, and completed in September 2018. Producer Zachary Weckstein stated, "Both Amsterdam and London have their own unique beauty. Holland is really welcoming to filmmakers...we were surrounded by unique architecture, skies..." The production budget was kept under a million euros.

== Soundtrack ==
British Jamaican R&B and soul singer Ruby Turner was hired to write and perform a theme song for the film. The result was "Chasing Love". The score was composed by Wan Pin Chu.

== Release ==
The Host premiered at the May Fair Hotel in London on 6 January 2020. The film had both its theatrical and VoD/streaming first release in North America on 17 January 2020 by Vertical Entertainment.

== Reception ==
On Rotten Tomatoes, the film has an approval rating of 25% based on 16 reviews and an average rating of 3.70 out of 10. On Metacritic, the film has a score of 32/100 based on 5 reviews, indicating "generally unfavorable reviews".

Cath Clarke of The Guardian gave the film 2/5 stars, saying that it was "a dull Brit flick that feels like two films boshed together: a London thriller in the Hitchcock mode followed by a little light torture porn in Amsterdam." Monica Castillo of RogerEbert.com gave the film 1/4 stars, calling it a ripoff of Psycho and Hostel, and added: "the unholy mix of the two did not pack enough suspense to keep this viewer guessing or vary enough for me to stop thinking about the parallels." Frank Scheck of The Hollywood Reporter wrote: "even Hitchcock would have thrown up his hands at the illogical plotting and over-the-top contrivances that make North by Northwest look like a documentary by comparison." Noel Murray of the Los Angeles Times said that the film "has the sheen of an art film and the plot of an old film noir", but added: "That's a formula that's been successful before; but here, for some reason, it lacks zing. Director Andy Newbery... makes the story look classy but can't find its beating heart."

The Morning Star gave the film 3/5 stars, saying that it "look[s] very slick and stylish and shows off key areas of London and Amsterdam in a flattering light", but noted its similarities to Psycho, and added: "Yet, although more grisly and gruesome, it lacks the inimitable style, finesse and slow-building tension of the master of suspense and horror himself." The Evening Standard also gave the film 3/5 stars, describing it as an "awkward mish-mash of Psycho and Eli Roth's Hostel", but praised the performances of Hassouni and Jacobi, as well as the cinematography.
