= Domino (2019 film) =

2019 film by Brian De Palma

- Theatrical release poster
- Directed by: Brian De Palma
- Written by: Petter Skavlan
- Produced by: Michel Schønnemann
- Starring: Nikolaj Coster-Waldau; Carice van Houten; Eriq Ebouaney; Mohammed Azaay; Søren Malling; Paprika Steen; Thomas W. Gabrielsson; Guy Pearce
- Cinematography: José Luis Alcaine
- Edited by: Bill Pankow
- Music by: Pino Donaggio
- Production companies: Schønne Film; Zilvermeer Productions; N279 Entertainment; Action Brand; Recalcati Multimedia; Light Industry Motion Pictures; Canal+ Cine+
- Distributed by: Kinepolis Film Distribution (Belgium); Dutch FilmWorks (Netherlands); GEM Entertainment (Denmark); Blue Swan Entertainment (Italy); Signature Entertainment (United Kingdom)
- Release date: 31 May 2019
- Running time: 89 minutes
- Countries: Belgium; Denmark; France; Italy; Netherlands; United Kingdom
- Languages: English; French; Arabic; Spanish
- Box office: $317,776

Domino is a 2019 crime thriller film directed by Brian De Palma and starring Nikolaj Coster-Waldau, Carice van Houten, Guy Pearce and Eriq Ebouaney. It is an international co-production filmed on-location across Europe. It tells the story of Danish police officer Christian Toft (Coster-Waldau), who is seeking justice for the murder of his partner Lars Hansen by the vengeful Ezra Tarzi (Ebouaney), hampered by his target being a CIA informant.

In the United States, it was released direct-to-VOD on 31 May 2019 by Saban Films but received theatrical releases in other territories. It received generally negative reviews. De Palma has expressed discontent with the final film, revealing that considerable sections of the original script were not filmed as intended due to production issues.

== Plot ==
Copenhagen police officers Christian Toft and Lars Hansen are sent to check out a reported domestic disturbance in an apartment. When they arrive, they find a man trying to leave the building with blood on his shoes. Toft assumes he's the domestic assailant and handcuffs him. Hansen sends Toft upstairs to go check on the man's wife when Toft realizes he accidentally left his gun at home. He takes Hansen's and goes upstairs, only to find the apartment filled with firearms, plastic explosives and a man lying dead with his throat slit and fingers removed. Using a hidden knife, the assailant breaks free from his restraints and attacks Hansen, inadvertently cutting his throat. The wounded Hansen tells Toft to give chase before losing consciousness. Toft pursues the assailant across the rooftop, but both fall into several stories. While Toft lies incapacitated, he sees three men come up and knock the assailant out before taking him away.

The police identify the assailant from fingerprints as Ezra Tarzi, a Libyan emigrant and former Special Forces operative whose parents had been killed by Salah Al-Din, an ISIS commander known as "Sheikh". Al-Din, who smuggles weapons and explosives through a tomato importer based in Brussels, is responsible for numerous terrorist attacks which he films and edits before posting them online. Tarzi's victim, Farooq Hares, was one of Al-Din's lieutenants, and Tarzi was trying to get to him. Toft wants to pursue Tarzi to bring him to justice but is suspended by his superior Detective Wold after he learns that Toft misplaced his service weapon, and is interrogated by internal affairs inspector Alex Boe.

Meanwhile, Tarzi and his family have been abducted by CIA agent Joe Martin, who has relentlessly pursued Al-Din ever since he killed five of his colleagues years earlier. Martin pressures a reluctant Tarzi into working on his behalf by threatening to reveal his murderous deeds to his children. He sends him first after Hares' nephew Yusuf in Copenhagen but during the struggle, Yusuf breaks loose and throws himself to his death. Tarzi manages to find several hidden cellphones in the apartment, from which Martin traces calls from a restaurant in Almería. They deduce that Al-Din intends to use a ferry to escape to friendly territory in North Africa, where he'll be effectively untraceable. Tarzi travels to Almería and attempts to find Al-Din by torturing one of his underlings, but gets nothing.

Despite being suspended, Toft remains resolute in finding Tarzi. Along with Boe, who also wants to avenge Hansen, the two travel unsupervised to Brussels, but during the drive receive a phone call from Hansen's wife Hanne that Lars has died in hospice. Heartbroken, Boe reveals that she and Lars had been having an affair and he'd been intending to divorce Hanne and start a family with her. When a shocked Toft pushes back, Boe reveals intimate photos of the two together and an ultrasound, indicating she's carrying his child.

Toft and Boe fail to find leads in Brussels but learn that Tarzi has been spotted in Almería and quickly change course for southern Spain. As they're driving from the airport, they spot one of Al-Din's tomato delivery trucks and Toft deduces the connection. They follow the truck, eventually stumbling across Al-Din himself in another. They follow him to a bullfighting arena, where he and several others splinter off into the ring and nearby building. Toft follows Al-Din to the roof of the building, while Boe follows the others into the arena, where she spots one of them causing a distraction while another gets into a strategic location. Al-Din's men fly a camera drone into the arena, intending to film their comrade's suicide bombing. Just in the nick of time, Toft and Boe realize what is happening and intervene, shooting Al-Din in the process.

Boe calls Wold, who in turn calls Martin, who proposes a trade—Tarzi for Al-Din. They meet on the rooftop, but Al-Din dies from his wounds. A distraught Tarzi asks Toft to kill him, but Martin makes clear that he intends to use the vengeful assassin as an asset for years to come. Suddenly, Boe arrives and shoots and kills Tarzi, avenging Lars. A disappointed Martin walks away, leaving an emotionally drained Toft and Boe alone.

== Cast ==
- Nikolaj Coster-Waldau as Christian Toft
- Carice van Houten as Alex Boe
- Guy Pearce as Joe Martin
- Eriq Ebouaney as Ezra Tarzi
- Thomas W. Gabrielsson as Chief Detective Wold
- Paprika Steen as Hanne Hansen
- Illias Adabb as Yusuf Hares
- Mohammed Azaay as Salah Al-Din
- Søren Malling as Lars Hansen
- Jay Pothof as Musa Tarzi
- Ardalan Esmailli as Omar
- Sachli Gholamalizad as Fatima
- Hamid Krim as Mustafa
- Younes Bachira as Miguel
- Emrin Dalgic as Farooq Hares
- Ardalan Esmaili as Omar
- Nicolas Bro as Porter

== Production ==
In 2017, Brian De Palma began to shoot Domino in Málaga, and continued in Almería at the airport, the bullring and the port. Walk-on extras were selected at the Estadio de los Juegos Mediterráneos. Shooting in the Almería bullring was cut short due to problems with the number of extras required. Christina Hendricks was replaced by Carice van Houten in the lead female role Alex Roe. When shooting finished in Spain, De Palma moved on to continue in Denmark.

Despite De Palma denying rumors that the final cut, clocking in at 89 minutes, was shortened against his wishes (an erroneous original running time of 148 minutes had been cited by reviewers), he declared: "I was not involved in the ADR, the musical recording sessions, the final mix or the color timing of the final print." In an interview with theplaylist.net he precised: "Domino is not my project, I did not write the script [...]. I had a lot of problems in financing [it]. I never experienced such a horrible movie set. A large part of our team has not even been paid yet by the Danish producers. [...] This was my first experience in Denmark and most likely my last."

== Release ==
The film was released on 31 May 2019.

== Reception ==
=== Box office ===
Domino grossed $317,776.

=== Critical response ===
On Rotten Tomatoes, the film holds an approval rating of 34% based on 71 reviews, with an average rating of 4.6/10. The website's critical consensus reads, "A rote thriller whose few flourishes serve as bittersweet reminders of its director's glory days, Domino continues a streak of DePalma disappointments." On Metacritic the film has a weighted average score of 40 out of 100, based on 20 critics, indicating "mixed or average reviews".

Benjamin Lee of The Guardian gave the film 1 out of 5 stars, writing, "What's most frustrating about Domino is just how invisible De Palma has become, bringing a tired script to screen without any real panache or even effort, the work of a man who's seemingly given up." David Fear of Rolling Stone gave the film 2.5 out of 5 stars, describing it as "A messy, uneven, heavy-handed, occasionally inspired, often insipid, steroidally stylistic De Palma joint, but one that fits the description in enough fits and starts to warrant the claim." Peter Sobcynzki of RogerEbert.com gave the film 3.5 out of 4 stars, writing, "This is not a great Brian De Palma film in the end, but its best moments will remind you of just how great he can be."
