= Inge Schrama =

Dutch actress (born 1985)

- Born: 5 December 1985 (age 40); Heemstede, Netherlands
- Occupation: Actress
- Years active: 2003-2017
- Known for: Goede tijden, slechte tijden

Ingmar (Inge) Schrama (born 5 December 1985) is a Dutch actress. She gained national fame through her longstanding role as Sjors Langeveld in the show Goede tijden, slechte tijden, which she played from 2003 until 2017.

== Career ==
Schrama was drawn to acting since her childhood. After obtaining her mavo-diploma, she focused full-time on becoming an actor. After a guest role in the VARA-show Dunya en Desie in 2003, she obtained a recurring role in Goede tijden, slechte tijden in the role of Sjors Langeveld.

In 2004 she also appeared in the Simone Kleinsma comedy show Kees & Co as herself.

After taking maternity leave in 2013 and 2016–2017, Schrama announced in 2019 that she would not return to Goede tijden, slechte tijden. Her role was taken over by Melissa Drost.

== Personal life ==
Schrama is a vegetarian, and in 2009 was announced as the "sexiest vegetarian" by animal rights organization Wakker Dier. In response Schrama produced a video for Wakker Dier explaining the importance of being a vegetarian to her.

Schrama has a relationship with theater director, artist and singer Daniël Samkalden. They had a daughter, Betty Sue, in 2013; and a son, Hugo, in 2016.

In 2017 Schrama announced she was burned out physically and had to temporarily take a break from Goede tijden, slechte tijden to take care of herself and her family. She also encouraged others to engage in self-care. In 2019 she announced she would not be returning to the show.

Schrama has not appeared in any shows since 2017, but has not formally announced her retirement from acting.

== Filmography ==
=== As actress ===
- Dunya & Desie (2003)
- Goede tijden, slechte tijden (2003–2017)
- Kees & Co (2004)
- Herbie: Fully Loaded (2005)

=== As guest ===
- Life & Cooking (2003)
- Koffietijd (2010)
- RTL Boulevard (2010)
- Ik hou van Holland (2010)
- Wat vindt Nederland? (2010)
