= Goede tijden, slechte tijden =

Dutch soap opera

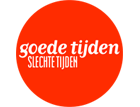
- Genre: Soap opera
- Based on: The Restless Years by Reg Watson
- Written by: Rohan Gottschalk (Head writer)
- Starring: Present cast
- No. of seasons: 37
- No. of episodes: 7,335

Production
- Executive producer: Peter Römer
- Running time: 23 min. w/o commercials 30 min. w/ commercials
- Production companies: Endemol Shine Nederland; Grundy

Original release
- Network: RTL 4
- Release: 1 October 1990 – present

Goede tijden, slechte tijden (Dutch pronunciation: [ˈɣudə ˈtɛidə(n) ˈslɛxtə ˈtɛidə(n)], lit. 'Good times, bad times'), also known as GTST or simply Goede tijden, is the longest-running Dutch soap opera, which began on 1 October 1990 on RTL 4. The program was the first daily (every workday) soap in the Netherlands and Europe. The soap is produced by Joop van den Ende and to date over 7,000 episodes have been broadcast. It was initially based on the Australian soap The Restless Years, however it switched to original scripts during the third season and onwards. GTST was originally broadcast Monday to Friday at 20:00, since March 2020, the program has been broadcast from Monday to Thursday. In 2015 GTST became available on demand via streaming platform Videoland.

At its peak, the show drew around 1.5 million viewers daily, in a country of just over 15 million people at the time. In 2022 the show was still watched by over 1 million people, with around 800,000 watching it on TV and an additional 300,000 on Videoland. In 2024 it nearly reached a million viewers. After 33 years, it remains the highest-rated soap opera in the Netherlands.

The soap mainly revolves around the lives of the families Alberts, Sanders, De Jong, Van Houten and Bouwhuis. It is set in the fictional town of Meerdijk. As in any other soap, marriage, divorce, kidnapping and business are a few of the ingredients of GTST, although in recent years GTST has become known for writing and producing more controversial storylines. GTST is also known for having a summer break each year, ending a season sometime in June with a cliffhanger, only to resume three months later in September. Although the early cliffhangers often revolved around family drama, later cliffhangers have often revolved around disasters and unexpected twists.

Many former actors who once were part of the cast are now well known in the Netherlands and Europe, including Katja Schuurman, Reinout Oerlemans, Georgina Verbaan, Antonie Kamerling, Erik de Vogel, Caroline De Bruijn, Bartho Braat, Inge Schrama and Melissa Drost.

In 2014, in a Christmas Day episode, there was a gay marriage in the soap opera when the on-screen couple played by Ferry Doedens and Dave Mantel, decided to get married; this was the first time this happened in a Dutch TV show.

In 2016, the show gained a spin-off called Nieuwe Tijden (English: New Times), which follows some of the younger characters from GTST and some new characters as they go off to college. Nieuwe Tijden was cancelled in 2018.

== Summary of seasons ==
Season	Broadcasting dates	Episode numbers	No. of episodes	On DVD	On Videoland
1	October 1, 1990 - June 28, 1991	1 - 195	195	28 September 2006	✓
1	October 1, 1990 - June 28, 1991	1 - 195	195	Republished 20 September 2011	✓
2	September 16, 1991 - May 29, 1992	196 - 380	185	12 September 2011	✓
2	September 16, 1991 - May 29, 1992	196 - 380	185	Republished 20 September 2011	✓
3	September 21, 1992 - May 28, 1993	381 - 560	180	7 December 2010	✓
4	August 30, 1993 - May 20, 1994	561 - 750	190	20 September 2011	✓
5	August 29, 1994 - May 26, 1995	751 - 945	195	15 November 2011	✓
6	August 28, 1995 - May 31, 1996	946 - 1145	200	21 August 2012	✓
7	August 26, 1996 - May 30, 1997	1146 - 1345	200	4 December 2012	✓
8	September 1, 1997 - May 29, 1998	1346 - 1540	195	23 April 2013	✓
9	August 31, 1998 - May 28, 1999	1541 - 1735	195	20 August 2013	✓
10	September 6, 1999 - June 9, 2000	1736 - 1935	200	25 March 2014	✓
11	September 4, 2000 - June 1, 2001	1936 - 2130	195	17 June 2014	✓
12	August 27, 2001 - June 28, 2002	2131 - 2350	220	19 August 2014	✓
13	September 2, 2002 - June 27, 2003	2351 - 2565	215	21 July 2015	✓
14	September 1, 2003 - June 25, 2004	2566 - 2780	215	20 October 2016	-
15	August 30, 2004 - June 24, 2005	2781 - 2995	215	14 February 2017	-
16	August 29, 2005 - June 23, 2006	2996 - 3210	215	15 August 2017	-
17	August 28, 2006 - June 29, 2007	3211 - 3430	220	14 November 2017	-
18	August 27, 2007 - June 20, 2008	3431 - 3645	215	30 May 2018	-
19	August 25, 2008 - July 3, 2009	3646 - 3870	225	21 August 2018	-
20	September 7, 2009 - July 2, 2010	3871 - 4085	215	16 October 2012	-
21	September 6, 2010 - July 8, 2011	4086 - 4305	220	19 November 2013	-
22	September 5, 2011 - July 6, 2012	4306 - 4525	220	13 November 2018	-
23	September 3, 2012 - July 5, 2013	4526 - 4745	220	26 March 2019	-
24	September 2, 2013 - July 4, 2014	4746 - 4965	220	18 June 2019	-
25	September 1, 2014 - July 3, 2015	4966 - 5185	220	22 September 2020	-
26	August 31, 2015 - July 1, 2016	5186 - 5405	220	8 December 2020	-
27	September 5, 2016 - July 7, 2017	5406 - 5625	220	TBA	-
28	September 4, 2017 - July 6, 2018	5626 - 5845	220	TBA	-
29	September 3, 2018 - July 5, 2019	5846 - 6065	220	TBA	-
30	August 26, 2019 - May 28, 2020	6066 - 6255	190	TBA	-
31	August 31, 2020 - July 8, 2021	6256 - 6435	180	TBA	✓ (single 2021)
32	August 30, 2021 - July 7, 2022	6436 - 6615	180	-	✓
33	August 29, 2022 - June 1, 2023	6616 - 6775	160	-	✓
34	August 28, 2023 - May 30, 2024	6776 - 6935	160	-	✓
35	August 26, 2024 - July 3, 2025	6936 - 7115	180	-	✓
36	September 1, 2025 - TBA	7116 - TBA	TBA	-	✓

== Cast ==
=== Present main cast members ===
Main cast members
Actor	Character	Duration
Kees Boot	Luuk Bos	2022–present
Caroline De Bruijn	Janine Elschot	1992–present
Caroline De Bruijn	Sophia Sanders	2002–2003
Mingus Claessen	Troj Veerman	2024–present
Margo Dames	Elly Cuperus	2025–present
Luah Felter	Marie Bax	2026–present
Jolijn Henneman	Elin Dublois	2017–2018
Jolijn Henneman	Shanti Vening	2025–present
David Hofland	Seb Bax	2026–present
Everon Jackson Hooi	Bing Mauricius	2005–present
Noa Jacobus	Nola Sanders	2022–present
Cas Jansen	Julian Verduyn	1996–1999, 2019–present
Johnny Kraaijkamp	Henk Visser	2020–present
Marieke van Leeuwen	Noor Kremer	2025–present
Bas Muijs	Stefano Sanders	1999–2005, 2009, 2014, 2020, 2022–present
Lona van Roosendaal	Billy de Palma	2018–2022, 2026–present
Jasmine Sendar	Elisa Rosalia	2023–present
Hassan Slaby	Marwan El Amrani	2020–present
Ferri Somogyi	Rik de Jong	1995–2004, 2007–present
Babette van Veen	Linda Bos-Dekker	1990–1998, 2005–2006, 2015–present
Marly van der Velden	Nina Sanders	2005–present
Erik de Vogel	Ludo Sanders	1996–present
Noa Zwan	Demi Verduyn	2019–present

=== Present recurring cast members ===
Actor	Character	Duration
Bart Peereboom	Marcel Boeve	2000–present
Dennis Honhoff	Barry Lansink	2009–present
Michael de Roos	Alex de Boer	2014–present
Various child actors	Max Mauricius	2018–present
Diyah Salem	Manu Mauricius	2020–present
Michiel Nooter	Bart Koster	2024–present

=== Former main cast members ===
Actor	Character	Duration
Ingmar van den Broek	Steef Verduyn	2022–2025
Cheyenne Löhnen	Bizou Pascal	2025
Jette van der Meij	Laura Selmhorst	1990–2025
Thijs Boermans	Jonathan Seegers	2023-2024
Tamara Brinkman	Saskia Visser	2019-2023; 2024
Noël van Kleef	Lynn Vegter	2022
Tommy van Lent	Steef Verduyn #1	2019-2022
Dorian Bindels	Daan Stern	2018-2022
Stephanie van Eer	Jojo Abrams	2018-2021
Hamza Othman	Ilyas El Amrani	2020-2021; 2023
Lone van Roosendaal	Billy De Palma	2018; 2019–2022
Edwin Jonker	Richard Van Nooten	2020-2022; 2024
Joep Sertons	Anton Bouwhuis	2010-2021
Cecilia Adorée	Tiffy Koster	2016; 2018–2021
Ferry Doedens	Lucas Sanders	2009-2015; 2016–2021
Vincent Visser	Valentijn Sanders	2019-2020; 2021
Alkan Cöklü	Amir Nazar	2017-2021
Annefleur van den Berg	Puck Odolphy	2019-2020
Melissa Drost	Sjors Langeveld #2	2017-2020
Faye Bezemer	Lana Langeveld	2017-2020
Britt Scholte	Kimberly Sanders	2016-2019
Floris Bosma	Rover Dekker #2	2018-2019
Dilan Yurdakul	Aysen Baydar	2012-2019
Anouk Maas	Zoë Xander	2017-2019
Roel Dirven	Flo Wagenaar	2018-2019
Giovanni Kemper	Q Bouwhuis #2	2018-2019
Tim Immers	Mark De Moor	1992-1993; 1995; 2018–2019
Lidewij Mahler	Marieke Vollaards #2	2018-2019
Max Willems	Q Bouwhuis #1	2017-2018
Ruud Feltkamp	Noud Alberts	2006-2018
Joey Ferre	Carlos Ramirez	2018
Beaudil Elzenga	Loes De Haan	2017-2018
Guido Spek	Sjoerd Bouwhuis	2010-2018; 2019
Stijn Fransen	Sam Dekker	2015-2018
Jord Knotter	Job Zonneveld #3	2015-2017
Inge Schrama	Sjors Langeveld #1	2003-2017
Robin Martens	Rikki De Jong	2010-2017; 2019; 2020
Buddy Vedder	Rover Dekker #1	2015-2017
Marjolein Keuning	Maxime Sanders	2008-2017
Miro Kloosterman	Thijs Kramer	2014-2017
Barbara Sloesen	Anna Brandt	2014-2017
Gaby Blaaser	Sacha Kramer	2014-2016
Bartho Braat	Jef Alberts	1991-2016; 2017; 2018–2019; 2021; 2024
Pip Pellens	Wiet van Houten	2010-2011; 2012; 2013–2016; 2017
Beau Schneider	Tim Loderus	2012-2016; 2018
Elvira Out	Bianca Brandt #2	2013-2015
Oscar Aerts	Vincent Muller	2013-2015
Gigi Ravelli	Lorena Gonzalez	2007-2014
Toprak Yalçiner	Nuran Baydar	2012-2014; 2018
Cynthia Abma	Bianca Brandt #1	2010-2013
Louis Talpe	Mike Brandt	2012-2013
Mark van Eeuwen	Jack van Houten	2005-2012; 2015; 2016; 2017
Jan Kooijman	Danny de Jong	2009-2012
Lieke van Lexmond	Charlie Fischer #2	2002-2012
Raynor Arkenbout	Edwin Bouwhuis	2010-2012
Anita Donk	Irene Poindexter	2008-2010
Peter Post	Martijn Huygens	2008-2010
Emiel Sandtke	Dex Huygens	2008-2010
Alexandra Alphenaar	Ronja Huygens	2008-2010
Charlotte Besijn	Barbara Fischer	1999-2010; 2011; 2015
Liza Sips	Vicky Pouw	2007-2009
Christophe Haddad	Nick Sanders	2003-2009; 2011–2012; 2014–2015
Chrisje Comvalius	Dorothea Grantsaan	2004-2008
Ruben Lürsen	Floris van Wickenrode	2008-2009
Sabine Koning	Anita Dendermonde	1992-2003; 2004; 2006–2009; 2014
Koert-Jan de Bruijn	Dennis Alberts	2002-2008; 2009
Wilbert Gieske	Robert Alberts	1990-2008; 2015–2016; 2018–2020
Robin Zijlstra	Milan Alberts #2	2007-2008
Rixt Leddy	Dian Alberts #3	2005-2008
Jeffrey Hamilton	Fos Fischer	2005-2008
Carolien Spoor	Florien Fischer	2005-2007
Joris Putman	Morris Fischer #3	2004-2007; 2010
Wik Jongsma	Govert Harmsen	1991-2006
Fajah Lourens	Yasmin Fuentes	2002-2005
Sebastiaan Labrie	Ray Groenoord	2003-2005
Elle van Rijn	Valerie Fischer	2003-2005
Inge Ipenburg	Martine Hafkamp	1990-1994; 1998; 2003–2005; 2017
Victoria Koblenko	Isabella Kortenaer	2000-2005; 2010
Wouter de Jong	Milan Alberts #1	2002-2004
Geert Hoes	Morris Fischer #2	2003-2004
Winston Post	Benjamin Borges	2000-2004
Yoka Verbeek	Tracey Gould	2003-2004
Maria Kooistra	Pascale Berings	2003-2004
Aukje van Ginneken	Charlie Fischer #1	1999-2003
Anouk van Nes	Roxy Belinfante	2002-2003
Daan Roelofs	Job Zonneveld #2	2002-2003
Hugo Metsers	Marcus Sanders	2001-2003; 2016–2017
Liesbeth Kamerling	Daantje Mus	2001-2003; 2006
Jeroen Biegstraaten	Gijs Bentz Van den Berg	2000-2002
Georgina Kwakye	Gladys Bloem	2000-2002
Teun Kuilboer	Job Zonneveld #1	2001-2002
Robine van der Meer	Meike Griffioen	2000-2002
Micky Hoogendijk	Cleo De Wolf	2000-2002
Chanella Hodge	Terra Bloem	2000-2001
Johnny de Mol	Sylvester Koetsier	2000-2001
Guusje Nederhorst	Roos de Jager	1992-2000 : 2001
Patrick Martens	Morris Fischer #1	1999-2001
Diana Sno	Mathilde Carillo	1997-2000
Tanja Jess	Bowien Galema	1997-2000
Georgina Verbaan	Hedwig Harmsen	1997-2000
Ingeborg Wieten	Suzanne Balk	1990-2000
Angela Schijf	Kim Verduyn	1996-1999
Philip Ivanov	Che Azalaia	1998-1999
Katja Schuurman	Jessica Harmsen	1994-1999; 2025
Jimmy Geduld	Arthur Peters	1992-1999
Chris Jolles	Dian Alberts #2	1994-1999
Wim Zomer	Daniël Daniël	1990-1999
Hilde de Mildt	Sylvia Merx	1993-1998
Brûni Heinke	Helen Helmink #2	1992-1997
Leontien Ceulemans	Eveline van Wessem	1996-1997
Reinout Oerlemans	Arnie Alberts	1990-1996; 2025
Paul Groot	Stan Nijholt	1993-1996
Bennie den Haan	Remco Terhorst	1994-1996; 2002–2003; 2016
Casper van Bohemen	Frits van Houten	1991-1995; 1998; 2005–2006
Antonie Kamerling	Peter Kelder	1990–1993; 1995
Nathalie Mourits	Marieke Vollaards #1	1993-1995
Martin van Steijn	Mickey Lammers	1991-1994; 1998; 2002–2003
Reyhan Erdogan	Fatima Yilmaz	1993-1995; 1996
Rick Engelkes	Simon Dekker	1990-1994; 1997–1998; 2003
Tom van Beek	Herman Hogendoorn	1990-1993; 1995
Lotte van Dam	Dian Alberts #1	1991-1993; 1996
Isa Hoes	Myriam Van der Pol	1990-1993; 1994
Frédérique Huydts	Annette Van Thijn	1990-1992; 1993
Henriëtte Tol	Karin Mulder	1991-1992
Tim Gunther	John Alberts	1991-1992
Joost Buitenweg	Rien Hogendoorn	1990-1992
Els van Rosse	Nancy Bijnema	1991
Marlous Fluitsma	Helen Helmink #1	1990–1991

=== Original cast members ===
Actor	Character	Duration
Antonie Kamerling	Peter Kelder	1990–1993, 1995
Reinout Oerlemans	Arnie Alberts (#1)	1990–1996, 2025
Joost Buitenweg	Rien Hoogendoorn	1990–1992
Frédérique Huydts	Annette van Thijn	1990–1992
Babette van Veen	Linda Dekker	1990–1998, 2005–2006, 2015–
Isa Hoes	Myriam van der Pol	1990–1994
Ingeborg Wieten	Suzanne Balk	1990–2000, 2025
Marlous Fluitsma	Helen Helmink (#1)	1990–1991
Rick Engelkes	Simon Dekker	1990–1994, 1997–1998, 2003, 2025
Jette van der Meij	Laura Alberts	1990–2025
Wilbert Gieske	Robert Alberts	1990–2008, 2015–2016, 2019–2020, 2025
Wim Zomer	Daniel Daniel	1990–1999
Inge Ipenburg	Martine Hafkamp	1990–1994, 2003–2005, 2017
Hein van Beem	Nico Stenders	1990–1991
Antoinette van Belle	Stephanie Kreeft	1990–1994
Dieter Jansen	Jan van Ede	1990–1991
Djuna Hougee	Petra van Ede	1990–1991
Carola Gijsbers van Wijk	Wil de Smet	1990–1998

== See also ==
- Gute Zeiten, schlechte Zeiten, a German version
- List of longest-serving soap opera actors
