= Volcano High =

2001 South Korean film

- Theatrical release poster
- Hangul: 화산고
- Hanja: 火山高
- RR: Hwasango
- MR: Hwasan'go
- Directed by: Kim Tae-kyun
- Written by: Kim Tae-kyun; Seo Dong-heon; Jeong An-cheol
- Produced by: Cha Seung-jae
- Starring: Jang Hyuk; Shin Min-ah; Huh Joon-ho
- Cinematography: Choi Young-taek
- Edited by: Ko Im-pyo
- Music by: Park Young
- Distributed by: Cinema Service
- Release date: December 5, 2001
- Running time: 121 minutes
- Country: South Korea
- Language: Korean

Volcano High (Korean: 화산고; RR: Hwasango) is a 2001 South Korean martial arts action comedy film. It revolves around a troublemaking high school student named Kim Kyung-soo (portrayed by Jang Hyuk) who finds himself transferred to the last school that will take him, the prestigious Volcano High, an institution whose students display an incredible talent in martial arts, with a few demonstrating even more mysterious psychic powers. Kyung-soo is drawn into fights between different clubs, a manuscript that is told to hold great power, and a group of teachers that will do whatever possible to keep the students in line. It was the 9th highest grossing Korean film of 2001 with 1,687,800 admissions nationwide, and had both an original domestic version and edited international version.

== Prologue ==
17 years of feuding, sparked by the Great Teacher's Battle, has stripped authorities of their power, as self-indulgence, disguised as self-control, grips the student body. The schools have fallen into disarray. However, there is a legend. The one who acquires the Secret Manuscript will end the chaos. It is a legend that disrupts the Martial Court of Volcano High. Now, in the 108th year of Volcano...

== Plot ==
Having been expelled from previous schools due to the lack of control of his powers, Kyung-soo is determined to graduate and attend Volcano High (the last school who will accept him). On his first day, he doesn't fit in due to him being an outsider and the only friends he makes are Shimma and Golbangi, whom the latter warn him of Chae-yi's reputation as Icy Jade.

In another room, Hak-rim is seen using his powers to make a tea based antidote for the principal. On his way to deliver the antidote, Hak-rim is able to prevent a fight between Kyung-soo and Jang Ryang (after the latter hated the smell of Fujian Tofu). Reminding the latter that he must not start trouble, Ryang leaves in anger.

Meanwhile, trouble ensues with Vice Principal Hak-sa who is determined to be principal of Volcano High from the former headmaster. Despite his fears of Jang Ryang, Hak-sa enlists his help to frame famed martial arts student, Hak-rim, for stealing an ancient manuscript that is believed to help end the 17 years of feuding. However, he soon runs into several problems after successfully framing and imprisoning Hak-rim. The principal is not only alive, but is in a happy induced coma and adding to Hak-sa's problems is that the Dark Oxen gang having taken over the school.

Most students begin to believe Kyung-soo framed Hak-rim, despite his denial and maintaining his innocence. However, Chae-yi believes him and tells her friend, Yo-seon that she suspects Ryang of framing Hak-rim. This is confirmed when Ryang shows up with intentions to make her, his queen so they could rule Volcano High together. Chae-yi refuses the offer and Kyung-soo tries to defend her. During a fight with Ryang, Kyung-soo is able to defeat him, but later is injured temporarily from the whole thing when he becomes distracted with his parents' plea to behave himself.

During visitation to Hak-rim, Chae-yi and Yo-seon tells him about the incident with Ryang's involvement in his framing. He soon begins to sense Kyung-soo is their only chance to restore order to Volcano High and asks them to set up a meeting with him.

Realizing that Ryang could hinder his efforts to take control of Volcano High and prevent him from taking the manuscript, Hak-sa calls forth Mr. Ma and his gang known as the Five Teachers to help him retake control of the school. They succeed and begin punishing the students for minor infractions. Kyung-soo tries to avoid being in trouble at all times, afraid of the shame he could bring to his family if expelled one last time. However, Mr. Ma recognizes him from a previous school and this forces him to fight.

One day, Hak-rim and Kyung-soo meet in visitation. Convinced that he may be the students only chance to bring order into the school once more, Hak-rim trains Kyung-soo to master his powers properly. Although Kyung-soo refuses to be involved, he slowly begins to realize the meaning of Hak-rim's warning that he can't escape his fate and must help restore order in the school by finding the said manuscript. He begins to master his powers in the boys shower room and accidentally gets Chae-yi wet. However, by this time, she begins to have feelings for him and vice versa.

Ryang is angered by this, but more so with Hak-sa when he discovers what the vice-principal has done in recruiting the Five Teachers. He tries to remind him of their original deal, but Mr. Ma sends him away. Kyung-soo finally fights Mr. Ma during the climax of the film. After a lengthy battle, he is able to defeat Mr. Ma and kill him. Opening the box, Kyung-soo reveals there is no manuscript to the shock of Ryang, Hak-sa and the remaining four teachers. However, the students doesn't care because they realized the meaning Hak-rim's words about the manuscript being a metaphor and that he knew Kyung-soo was the one who is able to restore order in the school. Hak-sa eventually loses it and the remaining four teachers willingly abandons him after the loss of Mr. Ma.

With that, the charges against Hak-rim are dismissed and he is set free. The principal is back to normal and is able to run the school again. When he mentions his dreams of the manuscript, the students reveal that they know the truth of Hak-rim's words of it being a metaphor. The principal asks them about it, the students reveal he knew that Kyung-soo was the one destined to restore order to the school because of his abilities. He able to fight Ryang fairly and win without worry of expulsion. Kyung-soo is able to graduate from high school and make his family proud for once. In the end scenes, Kyung-soo poses with the other clubs in photos. Chae-yi notices Yo-seon writing another letter to Hak-rim and realizes she has feelings for him. She soon advises Yo-seon to tell him of her feelings for him soon. She refuses and continues writing more letters. Hak-sa is seen in the same induced coma after his loss of favor.

== Cast and characters ==
- Jang Hyuk as Kim Kyung-soo: Main character whose powers caused him to get kicked out of school. Volcano High is the last school that will accept him and he's determined to graduate. Kyung-soo has a history with Mr. Ma and was reluctant to use his powers to help the students out with their struggle to find the manuscript, fearing expulsion and shaming his family.
- Shin Min-a as Yoo Chae-yi: Nicknamed and described as "Icy Jade." Captain of the kendo team and love interest of Kyung-soo.
- Huh Joon-ho as Mr. Ma: Leader of the 5 Teachers who are sent to discipline the students. He has a history with Kyung-soo.
- Byun Hee-bong as Vice Principal Jang Hak-sa: Angry due to the fact he isn't the principal and in spite of his own fears of Jang Ryang, Hak-sa enlisted his help to frame Hak-rim for stealing the manuscript and he can be imprisoned. When Hak-sa realizes the Dark Oxen has taken control of Volcano High, he enlists the help of the 5 Teachers to discipline the students.
- Kim Soo-ro as Jang Ryang: Nicknamed "Dark Ox." Leader of the Dark Oxen and captain of the weightlifting team. One of the most powerful and feared fighters at Volcano High. He helps the vice principal Hak-sa frame and imprison Hak-rim for stealing the manuscript so he can take control of the school. Ryang is in love with Chae-yi and wants her to be his queen. He despises Kyung-soo, seeing that he's much stronger in a fight than Ryang himself.
- Kwon Sang-woo as Song Hak-rim: Described as "Elegant Crane in a Pine Forest." The most powerful martial artist in Volcano High. He is imprisoned after being framed by Jang Ryang for trying to steal the manuscript. Realizing that Kyung-soo is Volcano High's only hope, Hak-rim trains him.
- Gong Hyo-jin as So Yo-seon: Described as "Single Hearted." Co-captain of the kendo team and admirer of Song Hak-rim. She was the first to believe that he was framed and that Jang Ryang was involved.
- Kim Hyeong-jong as Shimma: Captain of the rugby team. Befriends Kyung-soo.
- Jung Sang-hoon as Golbangi/Woo-ping: a member of the Dark Oxen who befriends Kyung-soo. He warns him of Chae-yi's reputation as Icy Jade when Kyung-soo accidentally spilled a bucket of water on her. Golbangi often plays masseuse to Ryang.

== Soundtrack ==
The movie released different soundtracks in South Korea, in Japan and in the US. The original Korean soundtrack was scored by Park Young and features mostly rock music, including two songs from Korean nu metal band R.F. Children. The Japanese soundtrack was written by Daita (former guitarist of Siam Shade), and is similar in style, with rock music. The US version is a completely altered version from the original featuring hip hop music.

== Japanese version ==
A Japanese version of the film released in late 2002, featured an International version of the film that was roughly twenty minutes shorter than the original Korean domestic version with Japanese text on-screen.

== American version ==
An American version of the film released as a Kung Faux parody in late 2003 by MTV featured voice acting by hip hop artists.

- Andre 3000 as Kim Kyung-soo
- Lil Jon as Jang Ryang
- Mýa as Yoo Chae-yi (renamed Jade)
- Snoop Dogg as Song Hak-rim
- Method Man as Mr. Ma
- Pat Morita as Vice Principal Jang Hak-sa (renamed Ko)
- Big Boi as Shimma
- Kelis as So Yo-seon (renamed Song)
- Tracy Morgan as Woo-ping

This Kung Faux parody version of the film aired only on MTV in the United States.

=== Differences Between the Korean and U.S. versions ===
American	Korean
Nearly 30 minutes edited out with scenes rearranged to a running time of nearly 80 minutes.	The movie is much longer with 121 minutes.
Song Hak-rim is imprisoned because Jang Ryang framed him for trying to poison the principal.	Song Hak-rim is imprisoned because Jang Ryang framed him for trying to steal the manuscript.
The main plot involves 5 teachers who are sent to discipline the students.	While this plot is still in the Korean version, the main plot is actually about a manuscript that is told to hold great power. Many want to know its location while the 5 teacher plot is actually a subplot. In the end, the students learn that the manuscript is just a metaphor and Hak-rim knew about Kyung-soo restoring order.
Kyung-soo is portrayed as a daydreamer and his recurring dream is about a girl whom he meets in the forest.	This girl is actually Shimma's fraternal twin sister and she sends him into the forest to seduce him to play rugby.
So Yo-seon is Song Hak-rim's girlfriend.	So Yo-seon merely admires Hak-rim from a distance while writing letters he would never get to read.
Jang Ryang and Yoo Chae-yi used to date, but Chae-yi dumped him and Ryang hopes to get back together.	The two were never together and Jang Ryang only confessed his feelings for her.
The music featured is popular hip hop released around the time this version came out.	The music is mostly rock.
Volcano High is said to be located in the mountains of Kim Tae-kyun	The location of Volcano High is never revealed and there is no such mountain called Kim Tae-kyun. This is actually the name of the director.
Kyung-soo willingly gives up his endurance contest with Jang Ryang and accidentally loses his fight with Jang Ryang	Kyung-soo remembers his mother, father, and sister telling him to restrain himself during both of these incidents.

== Comic ==
There is also a manhwa comic set before the movie called Volcano High Prelude. It was distributed with an English subtitled version of the original Korean domestic version of the film in the United States by Media Blasters.
