= Marly van der Velden =

Dutch actress and fashion designer

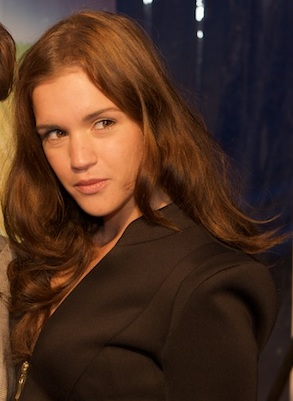
- Born: Marly van der Velden; January 6, 1988 (age 37); Delft, South Holland, Netherlands
- Occupation: Actress
- Years active: 2005–present
- Known for: Goede tijden, slechte tijden as Nina Sanders
- Children: 3

Marly van der Velden (born 6 January 1988 in Delft) is a Dutch actress and fashion designer.

== Biography ==
van der Velden enjoyed dancing from a young age; at the age of 15 in 2003 she took part as a Latin dancer in the Dutch championships for debutants. In 2006 she was nominated for 'sexiest woman' by FHM magazine. She was also nominated for 'sexiest vegetarian' by the Wakker Dier foundation. van der Velden was diagnosed with anorexia, but went through successful treatment for it and now has become an ambassador for Human Concern, is a foundation which helps people with eating disorders.

van der Velden is best known from Goede tijden, slechte tijden also known as GTST (literally translated: Good Times, Bad Times). She plays the role of Nina Mauricius–Sanders, a rich girl who is interested in fashion, like van der Velden herself.

== Fashion ==
van der Velden has with her friend and colleague Gigi Ravelli a successful jewelry line called 'Kuise Meisjes' (literally translated: maidens). It has become popular both in the Netherlands and across Europe. van der Velden and Ravelli also started a clothing line, Label 13 by Gigi and Marly. They also sell bags made by impoverished mothers in India. Profits from those bags go to the Tiny Miracle Foundation for support.

== Writing and voice over work ==
For four months, van der Velden wrote a weekly column with an ex-colleague, Liza Sips, in one of the most popular teen magazines in the Netherlands, 'Hitkrant'. They wrote about personal happenings in their week. In 2012 van der Velden provided the voice of Audrey in the Dutch version of the movie The Lorax.

== Filmography ==
Film
Year	Title	Role	Notes
2013	Verliefd op Ibiza	Bibi	
2016	Sneekweek	Zoë	

Television
Year	Title	Role	Notes
2005–present	Goede tijden, slechte tijden	Nina Sanders	Main
2008	Kinderen geen bezwaar	Iris	Episode: "Er in stinken"
2013	Verliefd op Ibiza	Bibi	Main
2016	Nieuwe tijden	Nina Sanders	Episode: "S01E45"
2019	GTST Stories	Nina Sanders	Recurring; S2
