= Dana Nechushtan =

Dutch director

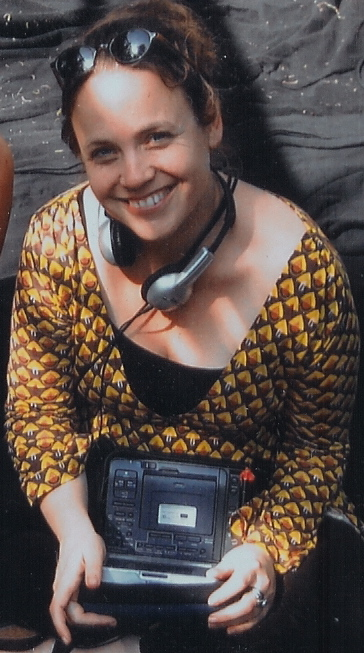
- Dana Nechushtan in 2008 on the set for television series Annie M.G.
- Born: 26 December 1970 (age 55)
- Years active: 1991–present
- Spouse: Franky Ribbens
- Children: 2

Dana Nechushtan (born 26 December 1970) is a Dutch director and screenwriter.

== Early life ==
Dana Nechushtan grew up on a kibbutz in the north of Israel. At the age of six, she moved to the Netherlands with her mother.

Until she was fourteen, she was not allowed to watch television because it was thought to come at the expense of her imagination. She did go to the cinema, however, to films her mother considered appropriate, featuring Greta Garbo and Marlene Dietrich.

After kindergarten, Nechushtan spent her entire school career at Waldorf schools. She attended the lower grades in Wageningen, and then continued at the Waldorf School in Nijmegen and at the Geert Groote College in Amsterdam.

== Career ==
In 1990, she was admitted to the Netherlands Film and Television Academy, where she graduated in 1994. For her graduation film Djinn, a political fairy tale, she received the Tuschinski Film Award for Best Dutch Graduation Film at the Netherlands Film Festival in 1994, as well as nominations for the Oscar for Best Foreign Student Film and the Grolsch Film Award.

Between 2002 and 2004 she was the director of the successful series Dunya en Desie. In 2008 she directed the film sequel of the show, which was submitted as the Dutch entry for the Oscars but failed to be nominated.

In 2013 she directed four music videos for Anouk.

From 2014 until 2020 she directed Hollands Hoop, for which she won Golden Calf award for best series in 2014.

== Personal life ==
Nechushtan is in a relationship with screenwriter Franky Ribbens. They have a son and daughter.
